= Moulthun Ly =

Australian chess grandmaster (born 1991)

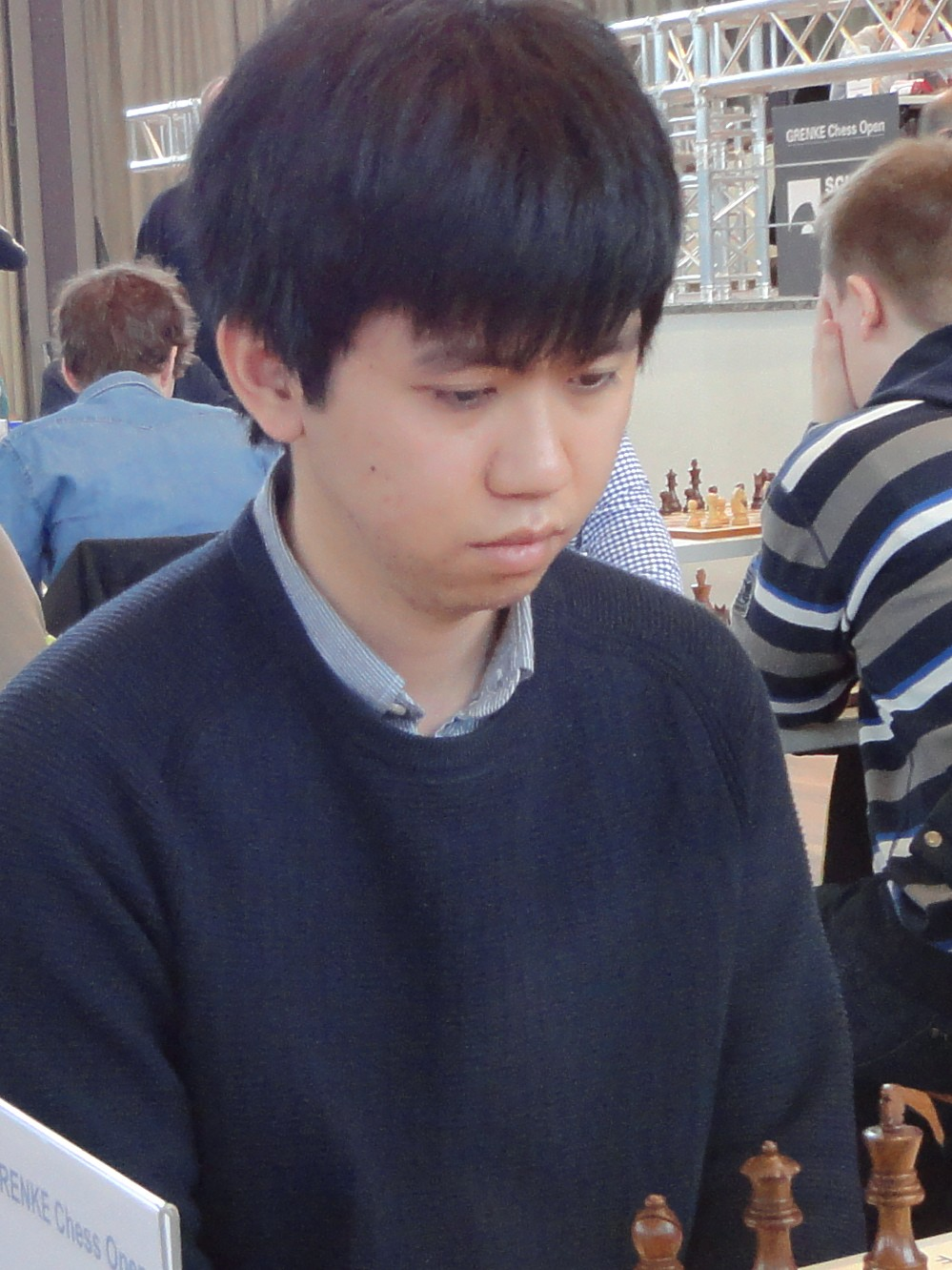

Personal information
- Born: 20 November 1991 (age 34) Cambodia

Chess career
- Country: Australia
- Title: Grandmaster (2016)
- FIDE rating: 2469 (July 2026)
- Peak rating: 2524 (October 2016)

Moulthun Ly (born 20 November 1991) is an Australian chess player. He was awarded the Grandmaster title by FIDE in 2016 to become Australia's sixth grandmaster (GM). He is the first person born in Cambodia to become an International Master or a Grandmaster.

== Chess career ==
Ly earned his first two International Master (IM) norms in 2006 at the World Open in Philadelphia and the Essent Open in Hoogeveen. He attained his final IM norm at the Doeberl Cup in Canberra in 2010. He was awarded the title of International Master the following year.

Ly picked up his first GM norm by winning the Sydney International Chess Open in 2014 with a score of 7.0/9. He achieved his last two GM norms in 2016 at the Tradewise Gibraltar Chess Festival, where he scored 6.0/10; and the Abu Dhabi International Chess Festival, where he scored 5.5/9.

In 2020, he won the 54th Begonia Open on tie-breaks from Mark Chapman, Zong-Yuan Zhao and Jesse Jager.

== Personal life ==
Ly grew up in Queensland, Australia. He is the founder and editor of 50 Moves Magazine, a chess magazine which he operates with contributions from leading Australian players such as fellow Australian grandmasters Ian Rogers and Max Illingworth.

Ly is currently the Head of Online Learning at Australian Junior Chess on Cloud, and publishes videos weekly on Molton, his personal YouTube channel. He remains active on the Australian chess scene.
