= Doeberl Cup =

Chess tournament in Canberra, Australia

The Doeberl Cup, known by its sponsored name as the O2C Doeberl Cup, is an annual chess tournament held in Canberra, Australia. It has been held every year since 1963 (apart from 2020) and is the longest running weekend chess event in Australia. The Canberra Times has described it as Australia's most prestigious annual chess tournament.

The tournament has been held over Easter each year since 1966, the earlier editions having been played on other long weekends. As of 2026, it runs in five sections, with the top section known as the Doeberl Cup Premier. Grandmaster Ian Rogers holds the record for the most wins (either outright or on tie-break) with 12.

The Doeberl Cup was named after its primary sponsor, Erich Doeberl, and, after a pause following Doeberl's death, sponsorship has continued through his daughter Rosemarie. The event has been organised by the ACT Chess Association since 2020.

== History ==
=== Origins ===
Erich Doeberl (1931–1994) was born in Austria and emigrated to Australia in 1955 under the Assisted Passage Scheme, having worked as an explosives expert in the Austrian coal mines. He was employed in that capacity on the Snowy Mountains Scheme before moving into the Canberra building industry as a carpenter, and went on to construct houses on a large scale through his companies Perfection Homes and, later, Fairlane Canberra.

In 1963, Doeberl's friend, colleague and fellow chess player Toni Wiedenhofer approached him with the idea of a weekend chess tournament in Canberra offering a prize fund to attract strong interstate players. Doeberl agreed to donate £100 and the tournament was publicised in national magazine Chess World. The event was organised by members of the chess club based at Canberra's Harmonie German Club, among them Wiedenhofer, Helmut Ackermann and George Treimanis.

The inaugural tournament was held that year at the Australian National University over the Queen's Birthday long weekend in June. 29 players entered and the prize fund was £100, and the field was split into an Open section of 21 players and a round-robin Reserves section of eight. Treimanis acted as director of play. The seven-round Open was won by John Purdy with a perfect score of seven wins, zero draws and zero losses.

The tournament moved to Easter in 1964, although the practice did not become fixed immediately: the 1965 event was played over the Labour Day weekend in October, and was the last to be held on a date other than Easter.

=== Sponsorship and administration ===
By 1970, the Doeberl Cup was established as the country's leading weekend tournament. Doeberl sponsored the event continuously for more than thirty years, a length of unbroken private sponsorship that Egan records as without parallel among the tournaments known to him, and in 1991 he was awarded a Special Appreciation Award by the Australian Chess Federation for his contributions to chess. Doeberl died in 1994 after suffering a heart attack while skiing. The family's involvement has continued through his daughter Rosemarie, and his company Fairlane Canberra remains among the tournament's sponsors.

O2C Solutions became the tournament's major sponsor in 2007 and acquired the rights to run the event from 2008, after which it has been known as the O2C Doeberl Cup. In 2020 operation of the tournament passed to the ACT Chess Association, with O2C retaining naming rights.

Bill Egan, a Canberra player who served as an organiser of the event over many years, published a history of its first fifty years in 2012.

=== Growth and participation ===
Egan records that the Doeberl Cup has attracted more overseas grandmasters and international masters than any other Australian chess tournament, among them Tony Miles, Larry Christiansen and Eduard Gufeld.

The Premier is constituted as a FIDE title tournament, and the awarding of norms is among the organisers' stated aims for the event. The 2010 tournament produced one grandmaster norm and three international master norms. The 50th edition in 2012 ended in a four-way tie for first place on 7/9, one of the four, Rathnakaran K of India, earning a grandmaster norm.

Entry numbers have risen substantially over the tournament's history. The 2015 event was capped at 270 players. A record field of 330 competed in 2021, which The Canberra Times reported as the largest in the event's history and which organiser Shaun Press suggested was probably the largest organised over-the-board tournament held anywhere in the world since the onset of the COVID-19 pandemic.

Lloyd Fell played in every Doeberl Cup from its inception in 1963 until 2008.

=== Venues ===
The inaugural tournament was played in the Haydon-Allen Building on the Australian National University campus, and returned there in 1965. The 1964 event was held at Canberra High School, in the building later occupied by the university's School of Art.

In more recent decades the tournament has alternated between Canberra clubs and university venues. It was hosted by the Hellenic Club in Woden in 2011, and was played at University House at the Australian National University in 2015. By 2018 it had moved to the Canberra Southern Cross Club in Woden, which also hosted the 2021 event following the cancellation of the 2020 tournament and remains the venue as of 2026. The club is also one of the tournament's sponsors.

== Structure ==
The tournament is divided into divisions by rating. As of 2026 there are five: the Premier, Major, Minor, Mini and Under 1200s. Eligibility is determined by a player's published standard rating with the Australian Chess Federation (ACF) or FIDE. Rating floors may be met with either an ACF or a FIDE rating, while the upper limits of each band are assessed on ACF ratings only. The Premier is open to players rated above 2000; the Major to those rated 1700 and above but below 2100; the Minor to those rated 1400 and above but below 1800; the Mini to players rated below 1500 or unrated by both federations; and the Under 1200s to those rated below 1200 or unrated. Entry to the Premier is free for players holding the grandmaster, international master, woman grandmaster or woman international master titles.

All divisions are played under the Swiss system. The Premier consists of nine rounds played over five days at a 90+30 time control (90 minutes for each player and 30 seconds of increment for each move made), and is constituted as a FIDE title tournament. The Major, Minor and Mini are seven-round events played over four days at the same time control, while the Under 1200s is a six-round event played over two days at 60+10. The Premier, Major, Minor and Mini are rated by both the ACF and FIDE, and the Under 1200s by the ACF only.

Players in the Premier may elect to take half-point byes for the first two rounds. Across the tournament a player may receive no more than two half-point byes and no more than one point in byes in total, and a bye taken in either of the final two rounds scores nothing.

To discourage short draws, players in the Premier who agree to a draw in fewer than 30 moves in any round become ineligible for the tournament's Fighting Fund prize; draws by repetition confirmed by an arbiter are exempt. Where a tie-break is required, the systems applied in descending order of priority are Median Buchholz, Buchholz, Sonneborn-Berger and the average rating of opponents.

Two lightning events are also held on the Saturday of the tournament, running alongside the main divisions rather than forming sections of it. The Street Chess Open Lightning is a nine-round event with no rating requirement, and the Street Chess ACF Under 1600 Lightning is a seven-round event restricted to players rated below 1600 by the ACF. Both are played at a 3+2 time control and are rated by the ACF and FIDE.

== Prizes ==
Total prize money for the 2026 tournament was A$26,140, of which A$16,050 was allocated to the Premier. First place in the Premier carried A$5,000 and a trophy, with cash prizes paid to tenth place. By comparison, the inaugural 1963 event offered a prize fund of £100, and the 50th edition in 2012 offered a Premier prize fund of A$12,350 with A$4,000 for first place.

The Premier carries a Fighting Fund prize, worth A$1,000 in 2026, shared equally by the winners of eligible games in the final round. Eligibility extends down to the lowest board holding a player whose score equals the lowest score on the top four boards.

Several named prizes are awarded. The Bedi Cup for the best Australian junior in the Premier and the Pooja Cup for the best Australian junior female in the Minor are perpetual trophies named after and sponsored by Canberra resident Baldev Bedi, and are open to players under 18 on the day their division begins. First place in the Major carries the Saint Memorial. Best female prizes are awarded across the divisions, along with medallions for specified rating brackets.

== Winners ==
- 1963 John Purdy
- 1964 Cecil Purdy
- 1965 Bill Geus
- 1966 Bill Geus
- 1967 John Kellner
- 1968 Ken Hill
- 1969 Doug Hamilton
- 1970 Cecil Purdy, Terrey Shaw, Fred Flatow
- 1971 Terrey Shaw
- 1972 Fred Flatow
- 1973 Anthony Wiedenhofer
- 1974 Maxwell Fuller
- 1975 Maxwell Fuller
- 1976 Robert Murray Jamieson
- 1977 Philip Viner
- 1978 Robert Murray Jamieson
- 1979 Fred Flatow
- 1980 Ian Rogers
- 1981 Ian Rogers
- 1982 Greg Hjorth
- 1983 Maxwell Fuller
- 1984 Ian Rogers
- 1985 Greg Hjorth
- 1986 Ian Rogers
- 1987 Greg Hjorth
- 1988 Larry Christiansen (USA)
- 1989 Ian Rogers
- 1990 Ian Rogers
- 1991 Ketevan Arakhamia (GEO)
- 1992 Tony Miles (ENG)
- 1993 Ian Rogers
- 1994 Darryl Johansen
- 1995 Ian Rogers
- 1996 Darryl Johansen
- 1997 Ian Rogers
- 1998 Michael Gluzman
- 1999 Darryl Johansen
- 2000 Aleksandar Wohl
- 2001 Darryl Johansen
- 2002 David Smerdon
- 2003 Ian Rogers
- 2004 Zong-Yuan Zhao
- 2005 Ian Rogers, Aleksandar Wohl
- 2006 Igor Goldenberg
- 2007 Ian Rogers
- 2008 Varuzhan Akobian (USA)
- 2009 Deep Sengupta (IND)
- 2010 Li Chao (CHN)
- 2011 Andrei Deviatkin (RUS)
- 2012 Adam Horvath (HUN)
- 2013 Li Chao (CHN)
- 2014 Liviu-Dieter Nisipeanu (GER)
- 2015 Zhou Weiqi (CHN)
- 2016 James Morris
- 2017 Surya Ganguly (IND)
- 2018 Timur Gareyev (USA)
- 2019 Hrant Melkumyan (ARM)
- 2020 Not held due to the COVID-19 pandemic
- 2021 Justin Tan
- 2022 Hrant Melkumyan (ARM)
- 2023 Hrant Melkumyan (ARM)
- 2024 Hrant Melkumyan (ARM)
- 2025 Guha Mitrabha (IND)
- 2026 Guha Mitrabha (IND)

All players are Australian unless indicated otherwise. With the exceptions of 1970 and 2005, only outright winners or winners on tie-break are listed.

== See also ==
- Australian Chess Championship
- Chess in Australia
