= George Xie =

Australian chess player (born 1985)

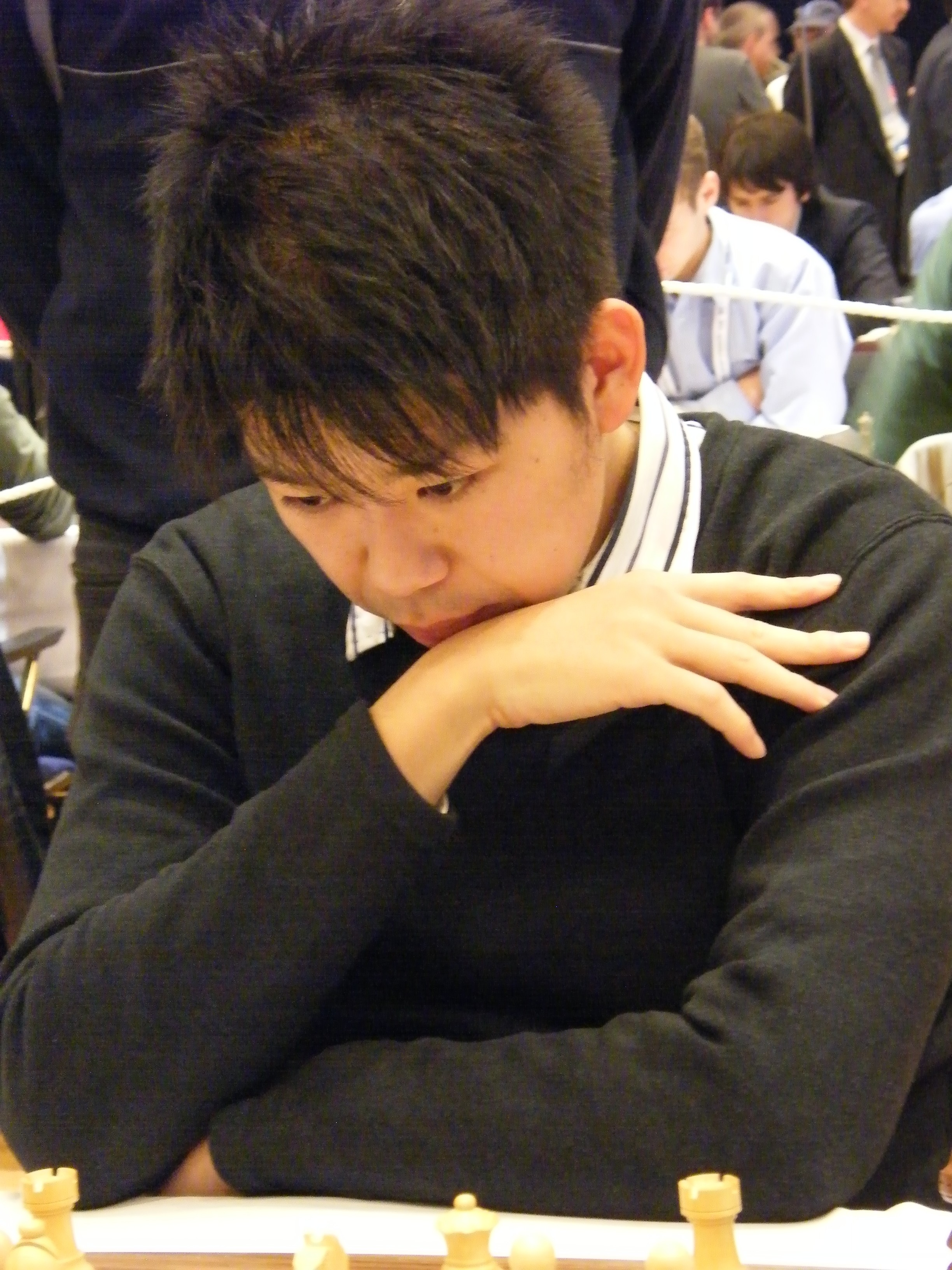
- Xie at Dresden in 2008

Personal information
- Born: George Wendi Xie; 20 October 1985 (age 40) Sydney, Australia

Chess career
- Country: Australia
- Title: International Master (2007)
- Peak rating: 2482 (May 2010)

George Xie is an Australian chess player. He is an International Master (IM), chess tutor, and a former Australian Open chess champion.

== Career ==
George Xie tied for first in the 2009 and 2011 Australian Open Chess Championship tournaments, winning the Australian Open Champion title on countback in 2011.

He became an International Master in 2006 and was ranked 3rd in Australia. He was a board 4 member of the Australian national team at the 2008 Dresden Olympiad, and board 3 member of the Australian national team at the 39th Chess Olympiad in Khanty-Manisysk, Russia.

At age 16, Xie won the NSW state championship with a perfect score of 9/9, and he did it again in 2004 NSW state championship.

He gained his first GM norm at the 2009 Sydney International Open, tying =1st (2nd on tiebreak) with 3 other GMs. He exceeded the score required for a norm by half a point. Earlier, he had missed a norm at the 2009 Doeberl Cup in Canberra by half a point.

He came equal first with Aleksandar Wohl in the 2009 Australian Open Chess Championship held in Manly, Sydney. No playoff was held and the title was awarded to Wohl on tiebreak.

In 2010, Xie came second after Zhao Zong-Yuan in the 2010 Australian Chess Championship held in Sydney. He was equal first with Zhao before the last round with 9/10. He lost against Stephen Solomon in the last round while Zhao had won his game.

Xie's next major tournament in the same year was the 48th Doeberl Cup held in Canberra, Australia. By finishing second after Li Chao with 7/9, he was expected to be awarded a GM norm. In the tournament, Xie managed to share a point with Li Chao and defeated the 2010 Australian Chess Champion Zhao Zong-Yuan.

In January 2011, Xie defended his title in the Australian Open Chess Championship 2011 which he won two years earlier. The crosstable saw him tied with Moulthun Ly and Zhao Zong-Yuan with 8.5/11. The title was awarded to Xie because he had played the highest rated opposition.

Xie was a member of the 2008 and 2010 Australian Chess Olympiad teams.

As of 25 May 2010, Xie had all three Grandmaster norms, and would've qualified to be a grandmaster had his FIDE rating reached 2500.

== Notable tournament wins ==
- 2002 NSW State Championship
- 2002 Fischer's Ghost Open
- 2003 Inter-leagues club competition
- 2003 University of NSW Chess Club Championship
- 2003 Fairfield Winter Cup
- 2003 Ryde-Eastwood Open
- 2003 Gosford Open
- 2003 November Chess Weekender
- 2004 Australian Day Weekender
- 2004 Rosebay Open
- 2004 Ryde-Eastwood Open
- 2004 Coffs-Harbour Open
- 2004 City of Sydney Championship
- 2004 NSW State championship
- 2005 City of Sydney Championship
- 2005 ST George May Weekender
- 2005 Vikings Open
- 2006 Australian Masters
- 2006 NSW Open
- 2007 NSW Rapid event
- 2007 Rooty Hill Rapid tournament
- 2007 Coffs Harbour Open
- 2007 Viking Open
- 2008 Mingara Open
- 2008 City of Parramatta Open
- 2009 Australian Open Championship
- 2009 Ryde-Eastwood Open
- 2009 Fischer Ghost Open
- 2009 Sydney International Open (=1st)
- 2010 Dubbo Open
- 2010 Australian Day Open
- 2011 Australian Open Championship
- 2011 Gosford Open
- 2012 ANU Chess Open
- 2012 Foundation Day Open
- 2012 Adelaide Checkmate Open
- 2012 Oceania Blitz Chess Championship
- 2023 Australian Day Weekender
- 2023 City of Sydney Rapid Championship (=1st)
- 2023 Ryde-Eastwood Open (=1st)
- 2024 October Open
- 2025 Australian Day Open
- 2025 University of NSW Open (=1st)
- 2025 Sydney Chess Club April Rapid Open (=1st)
- 2025 NSW Open (=1st)
- 2025 NSW State Championship
- 2026 Australian Day Open (=1st)
- 2026 Sydney Chess Academy January Rapid Open (=1st)
- 2026 Sydney Chess Academy March Rapid
- 2026 City of Sydney Blitz Championship
- 2026 Sydney Chess Club May Blitz Open.
- 2026 Norths Chess Club Rapid Open (=1st)
- 2026 Sydney Chess Academy June Rapid Open
- 2026 Burwood Autumn Open
- 2026 Sydney Chess Club August Blitz Open (=1st)
- 2026 Norths Chess Club Rapid Championship
