= Greg Hjorth =

Australian mathematician and chess player (1963–2011)

- Born: 14 June 1963; Melbourne, Australia
- Died: 13 January 2011 (aged 47); Melbourne, Australia
- Scientific career
- Known for: Hjorth's theory of turbulence
- Awards: First Sacks Prize from the Association for Symbolic Logic (ASL) (1993); Sloan Foundation Fellowship 1998; An invitation to the International Congress of Mathematicians (1998); The Karp Prize of the ASL (2003); Invited key speaker to the Alfred Tarski Lectures at UC Berkeley
- Fields: Mathematics, set theory, logic
- Workplaces: University of Melbourne; University of California
- Doctoral advisor: William Hugh Woodin
- Chess career
- Country: Australia
- Title: International Master (1984)
- Peak rating: 2440 (July 1984)

Greg Hjorth (14 June 1963 – 13 January 2011) was an Australian mathematics professor and chess player. He worked in the field of mathematical logic.

== Chess career ==
Hjorth came second in the 1980 Australian Chess Championship, at the age of 16. He won the Doeberl Cup in Canberra in 1982, 1985 and 1987, and played for Australia in the Chess Olympiads of 1982, 1984 and 1986.

He was Commonwealth Champion in 1983 (joint with Ian Rogers) and International Master in 1984.

According to Chessmetrics, his best single performance was at the 1984 British Chess Championship, where he scored 4/7 against 2551-rated opposition, for a performance rating of 2570.

Hjorth retired from most chess in the 1980s.

== Mathematical career ==
Hjorth earned his PhD in 1993, under the direction of W. Hugh Woodin, with a dissertation entitled On the influence of second uniform indiscernible. He held faculty positions at the University of California, Los Angeles and the University of Melbourne. The University Of Melbourne awards the Greg Hjorth Memorial Prize (biennial scholarship is awarded to the most outstanding postgraduate thesis in mathematics, with preference given to areas of logic, set theory, measure theory or related topics passed by examiners within the previous two calendar years) named after him. Among his most important contributions to set theory was the so-called theory of turbulence, used in the theory of Borel equivalence relations. In 1998, he was an Invited Speaker of the International Congress of Mathematicians in Berlin.

== Death ==
Hjorth died suddenly of a heart attack in Melbourne, on 13 January 2011.

== Book ==
- G. Hjorth: Classification and Orbit Equivalence Relations, Mathematical Surveys and Monographs, 75, American Mathematical Society, Providence, Rhode Island, 2000.
