= 1976 in chess =

Events in chess in 1976;

== Top players ==
FIDE top 10 by Elo rating – January 1976

1. Anatoly Karpov Soviet Union 2695
2. Viktor Korchnoi Soviet Union 2670
3. Tigran Petrosian Soviet Union 2635
4. Lev Polugaevsky Soviet Union 2635
5. Boris Spassky Soviet Union 2630
6. Bent Larsen Denmark 2625
7. Lajos Portisch Hungary 2625
8. Efim Geller Soviet Union 2620
9. Ljubomir Ljubojević Yugoslavia 2620
10. Henrique Mecking Brazil 2620

== Chess news in brief ==
- Anatoly Karpov commences his tenure as world champion in a positive way, with confident and sometimes dominant performances at many of the strongest tournaments on offer. Undoubtedly the strongest of all is the 44th Soviet Championship, where he runs out winner with 12/17, ahead of Yuri Balashov (11/17), Tigran Petrosian and Lev Polugaevsky (both 10/17). At Skopje he scores 12½/15, ahead of Wolfgang Uhlmann (11/15) and Jan Timman (10½/15). In Amsterdam, he wins a quadrangular contest from Walter Browne, Fridrik Olafsson and Timman. A winning score of 7/9 at Montilla-Moriles comfortably eclipses Lubomir Kavalek, Ricardo Calvo and Michael Stean (all 5½/9). The new champion's only slip occurs at Manila/Batangas, where it is Eugenio Torre who tops another four player event ahead of Karpov, Ljubomir Ljubojević and Walter Browne. Karpov is awarded the Chess Oscar for the fourth successive year, while Fischer's name is dropped from the official FIDE rating list.
- FIDE vice-president Florencio Campomanes meets with Bobby Fischer in Bangkok and continues to speak optimistically about a potential match with Karpov, who appears to be open to the possibility. Much less likely is that Fischer will take his place at the forthcoming Candidates tournament. Boris Spassky is the probable replacement if Fischer fails to meet the confirmation deadline.
- In the next cycle of the world championship, Interzonal tournaments are held at Biel and Manila. The Biel event is won by Bent Larsen with 12½/19, ahead of Tigran Petrosian, Lajos Portisch and Mikhail Tal (all 12/19). After a play-off, it is Tal who misses out on a place in the Candidates' phase. Manila is a triumph for Brazilian star Henrique Mecking, with 13/19. The other qualifiers are Vlastimil Hort and Lev Polugaevsky (both 12½/19).
- The 22nd Chess Olympiad is held in Haifa, Israel, just 19 miles from conflict-stricken Lebanon. Amidst political turmoil, many teams including favourites USSR, decide to boycott the event. Max Euwe refuses to cancel, leaving the forty-eight remaining teams to compete using a Swiss pairing format for the first time in an Olympiad. USA win with 37/52, Netherlands take silver with 36½/52 and England the bronze with 35½/52. The women's event is won by Israel (17/21), ahead of England (silver) and Spain (both 11½/21). A rival event, with thirty-two participating nations, is independently organised in Tripoli and is titled the "Against Israel Olympiad".
- Viktor Korchnoi, is joint winner at Amsterdam's IBM tournament with Tony Miles (both 9½/15), ahead of Gyula Sax on 9/15. At the tournament's conclusion, Korchnoi approaches the Dutch authorities to seek asylum and becomes the first of the USSR's high-profile players to defect to the West. His wife and son remain in the USSR, unable to leave. The Soviet authorities condemn Korchnoi's actions and strip him of all his domestic titles and honours. They ask FIDE to annul his grandmaster title and debar him from the world championship cycle. FIDE refuse to comply, on the grounds that his membership is individual to him and not as a representative of a state. A letter is published in Sovietsky Sport, denouncing Korchnoi in very strong terms and is signed by thirty-one Soviet grandmasters including Tigran Petrosian, Vasily Smyslov and Mikhail Tal. Notably, it is not signed by Mikhail Botvinnik or David Bronstein. Karpov chooses not to sign, but pens his own letter of dismay, which is critical of Korchnoi in a milder manner. Bobby Fischer sends Korchnoi a telegram, congratulating him on his defection.
- At Las Palmas, Efim Geller wins with 10½/15. Following are Bent Larsen (10/15), Robert Byrne and Robert Hübner (both 9½/15).
- A strong Lone Pine tournament is won by Tigran Petrosian with 5½/7, ahead of Larry Christiansen, Vasily Smyslov, Oscar Panno, Miguel Najdorf, Miguel Quinteros, Tony Miles, Ken Rogoff, Győző Forintos and Walter Browne (all 5/7).
- Vlastimil Hort has a good year, winning two category 10 events and taking his rating beyond the 2600 level. At Banja Luka he wins with 10/15, ahead of Milan Vukic on 9½/10. At Vinkovci, he shares first place with Gyula Sax on 10½/15, ahead of Lev Polugaevsky and Georgi Tringov (both 10/15).
- Yerevan is a success for Oleg Romanishin. His 10½/15 gives him a clear point win over Boris Gulko and Vladimir Savon, who share second place. At the year end 1976/77 Hastings International Chess Congress, Romanishin enjoys a winning margin of two clear points.
- At Sochi, Lev Polugaevsky wins the 11th Chigorin Memorial jointly with Evgeny Sveshnikov (both 10½/15), ahead of Vitaly Tseshkovsky, who trails by a full point.
- Serving as a warm-up for the main Premier League Soviet Championship in Moscow (see above), the First League Championship is held in Minsk. Remarkably, this 'second-string' event is still stronger than any other national championship and the entry includes Mark Taimanov, Alexander Beliavsky, Lev Alburt, Gennady Kuzmin and Semyon Furman. Making the headlines however, are Iosif Dorfman who wins convincingly with 11½/17, ahead of Vitaly Tseshkovsky, Evgeny Sveshnikov and Nukhim Rashkovsky (all 10/17).
- Jan Smejkal impresses at Novi Sad, his 11½/15 giving him a wide margin of victory over Dragoljub Velimirović (10/15) and Vlastimil Hort (9½/15).
- At Dubna, Vitaly Tseshkovsky runs out the winner with 10/15. Fellow Soviet, Igor Zaitsev finishes second with 9½/15, while Aivars Gipslis, Tony Miles, Vladimir Savon and Alexei Suetin all share third on 9/15. Miles' score is enough to secure him his final GM norm and the title. He becomes England's first over-the-board GM, joining Keith Richardson in the field of Correspondence Chess and Comins Mansfield the problem composer. Miles wins the race from Ray Keene, his principal rival, and claims the £5,000 prize put up by businessman Jim Slater, a chess sponsor and enthusiast.
- At Wijk aan Zee's 38th Hoogovens tournament, Ljubomir Ljubojević and Fridrik Olafsson share first with 7½/11. Following a point behind are Bojan Kurajica and Mikhail Tal.
- The 13th Capablanca Memorial in Cienfuegos is won by Boris Gulko on 10½/15, ahead of Yuri Razuvaev and Guðmundur Sigurjónsson (both 10/14).
- Fridrik Olafsson and Jan Timman triumph at Reykjavik (both 11/15), ahead of Miguel Najdorf and Vladimir Tukmakov (both 10½/15).
- The World Junior Chess Championship is held at Groningen at the year end. Unusually, it is combined with the European Junior Chess Championship. American Mark Diesen places first and takes the World title. Ľubomír Ftáčnik takes second spot and becomes European champion.
- At Odessa, Rosendo Balinas wins with 10/14 ahead of Lev Alburt and Vladimir Savon (both 9/14).
- During the FIDE Conference held in Haifa alongside the Olympiad, three more countries are granted membership. The inclusion of Bermuda, Mauretania and Papua and New Guinea brings the total membership to ninety-seven nations.
- Boris Spassky is granted a one-year visa to spend time in France with his new French-born wife. The Soviet authorities prohibit him from playing chess while he is away, despite his protests. While in France, he is requested to sign the Korchnoi condemnation letter at the Soviet Embassy in Paris, but he declines.
- Dedicated, portable chess computers that are capable of giving social players a satisfactory game become commercially available.

== Births ==
- Peter Svidler, Russian GM, world championship contender and former national champion – June 17
- Judit Polgár, Hungarian GM and the strongest woman player in history – June 23
- Zhu Chen, Chinese GM and former women's world champion – March 16
- Xu Yuhua, Chinese GM and former women's world champion – October 29
- Liviu-Dieter Nisipeanu, Romanian GM and world championship semi-finalist – August 1
- Zoltán Almási, Hungarian GM and multiple national champion – August 29
- Vadim Zvjaginsev, Russian GM, highly rated player and Olympiad medallist – August 18
- Daniel Fridman, Latvian-German GM, former national champion of both countries – February 15
- Dusko Pavasovic, Slovenian GM, winner of the national championship – October 15
- Almira Skripchenko, Moldovan-French IM and WGM, women's European champion – February 17
- Anna Hahn, Latvian-American WIM and former women's champion of both countries – June 21
- Ramachandran Ramesh, Indian GM, former British and Commonwealth champion – April 20
- Yannick Pelletier, Swiss GM and multiple winner of the national championship – September 22
- Lenka Ptáčníková, Czech-Icelandic WGM, former women's Nordic champion – January 16
- Danny Gormally, English GM, Olympiad team member and British rapidplay champion – May 4
- Wu Wenjin, Chinese GM and former member of the Olympiad team – March 10
- Gabriel Schwartzman, Romanian-American GM, former winner of the U.S. Open – October 23
- Boris Kreiman, Russian-American GM, player, coach and academy founder – June 7
- John Paul Wallace, Australian IM, youngest ever national champion – November 19
- Josh Waitzkin, American IM, U.S. junior champion and the subject of a movie – December 4
- Demis Hassabis, English player, computer game designer, neuroscientist – July 27

== Deaths ==
- Carlos Maderna, Argentine Master, twice the national champion – January 23
- Abram Model, Latvian-Russian Master, Leningrad champion and Botvinnik's trainer – February 16
- Donald Byrne, American IM and US Open champion, lost the "Game of the Century" to Fischer – April 8
- Clarice Benini, Italian Master, national champion, women's world championship contender – September 8
- József Szily, Hungarian IM, runner-up at first European championship – April 26
