= Anton Smirnov (chess player) =

Australian chess grandmaster (born 2001)

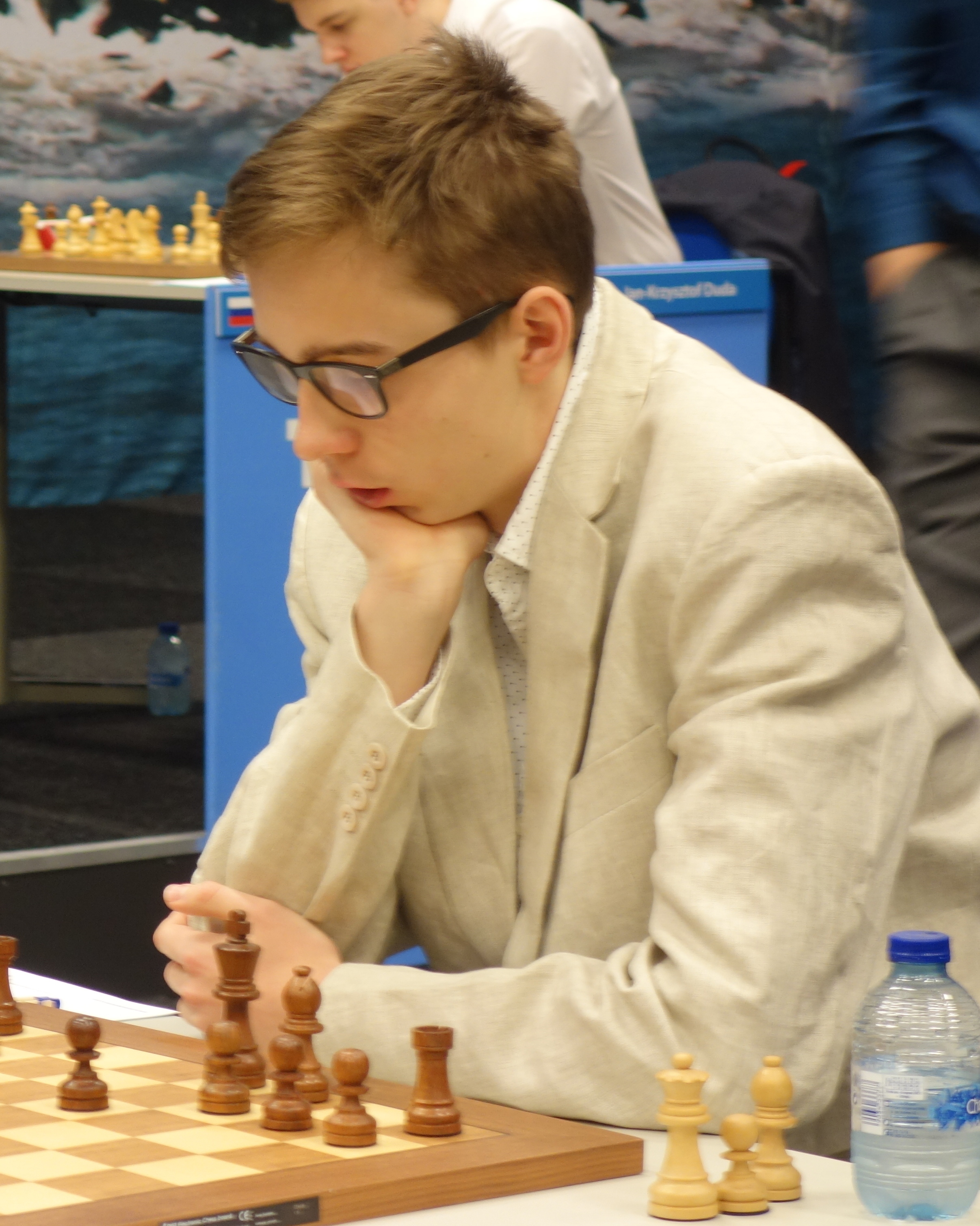
- Smirnov at Tata Steel Chess Tournament, 2020

Personal information
- Born: Anton Vladimirovich Smirnov; 28 January 2001 (age 25) Canberra, Australia

Chess career
- Country: Australia
- Title: Grandmaster (2017)
- FIDE rating: 2586 (July 2026)
- Peak rating: 2604 (January 2020)

Anton Vladimirovich Smirnov (born 28 January 2001) is an Australian chess player. He was awarded the title of Grandmaster (GM) by FIDE in 2017.

== Chess career ==
Smirnov was the Australian junior champion in 2014 and won the Australian Grand Prix in 2015. He has represented his country in the Chess Olympiad in 2014 in Tromsø, Norway and in 2016 in Baku, Azerbaijan. In the Tromsø Chess Olympiad he was undefeated playing on board 5 and scored 7½/9 points. In the Baku Chess Olympiad he was undefeated again, this time on board 4 scoring 8½/10 points. He also achieved 20-game norm for the title Grandmaster.

Smirnov played in the Chess World Cup 2017, where, after drawing the 2 classical games against the 2016 World Championship challenger Sergey Karjakin, he was eliminated in the rapidplay tiebreaks.

In September 2017 Smirnov played in the 2nd Capablanca Memorial in Crete, where he scored 7/9 points and earned his third and final norm required for the Grandmaster title.

In 2018 Smirnov won the Australasian Masters tournament in Melbourne with a 2700+ performance, represented Australia on board one at the Batumi Olympiad, finished 2nd at the Australian Championship in Sydney, and finished 2nd (behind Temur Kuybokarov) in the Gold Coast Open with 7/9 beating Zhao Zong Yuan and Max Illingworth.

== FIDE ratings ==
Elo development
View chart definition.

== Personal life ==
Anton's father, Vladimir Nikolaevich Smirnov (born 1974), is also a chess player with the title of International Master and associate professor of economics at the University of Sydney. Anton has a younger brother, Timofey.
