= Junta Ikeda =

Australian chess player (born 1991)

Personal information
- Born: December 15, 1991 (age 34) Canberra, Australia

Chess career
- Country: Australia
- Title: International Master (2014)
- Peak rating: 2460 (April 2022)

Junta Ikeda (池田 惇多, Ikeda Junta; born December 15, 1991) is an Australian chess player.

== Chess career ==
In 2007, Ikeda played for Team Australia in the 2007 World Youth U16 Olympiad in Singapore, where he won the silver medal for Board 2. In 2008, he became the Australian junior champion.

He won the Japanese Chess Championship in 2013 and became an International Master in 2014.

In August 2014, he played for Australia in the 41st Chess Olympiad, during which he defeated grandmaster Gilberto Hernandez Guerrero during their match against the higher-seeded Mexican team.

Ikeda won the 35th Balaton International Chess Festival GM tournament 2017 in Balantonlelle, Hungary with 7/9, achieving his first norm for the title of Grandmaster.

In April 2019, he tied with six other players for fifth place in the Sydney Open. He was ranked in 8th place after tiebreaks and held draws against tournament winner Raymond Song and grandmaster Abhijit Kunte.

He won the NSW Open tournament in 2019 and 2020.

In January 2020, he finished in second place at the Australian Chess Championship, half a point behind champion Temur Kuybokarov.

Ikeda publishes videos on his YouTube channels in English and Japanese.
