= Terrey Shaw =

Australian chess player (1946–1997)

Personal information
- Born: 12 October 1946
- Died: 5 December 1997 (aged 51)

Chess career
- Country: Australia
- Title: International Master (1981)
- Peak rating: 2390 (July 1971)

Terrey Ian Shaw (12 October 1946 – 5 December 1997) was an Australian chess International Master. He represented Australia at nine consecutive Chess Olympiads between 1968 and 1984, winning an individual silver medal in 1968 and 1972.

== Biography ==
From the end of the 1960s to the mid-1980s, Shaw was one of the strongest chess players in Australia. In 1978, in Perth, he shared the 1st–3rd place in the Australian Chess Championship, but in the playoff he finished third behind Robert Jamieson and Max Fuller.

Shaw twice played in World Chess Championship South East Asian Zonal tournaments: in 1969, in Singapore he shared 6th–7th place, and in 1972, in Hong Kong he shared 5th–6th place.

Shaw played for Australia in the Chess Olympiads:

- In 1968, at second reserve board in the 18th Chess Olympiad in Lugano (+11, =2, -1) and won an individual silver medal,
- In 1970, at fourth board in the 19th Chess Olympiad in Siegen (+8, =7, -2),
- In 1972, at second reserve in the 20th Chess Olympiad in Skopje (+9, =4, -2) and won an individual silver medal,
- In 1974, at third board in the 21st Chess Olympiad in Nice (+7, =6, -4),
- In 1976, at third board in the 22nd Chess Olympiad in Haifa (+3, =5, -3),
- In 1978, at third board in the 23rd Chess Olympiad in Buenos Aires (+5, =2, -4),
- In 1980, at first reserve board in the 24th Chess Olympiad in La Valletta (+5, =5, -1),
- In 1982, at first reserve board in the 25th Chess Olympiad in Lucerne (+3, =4, -4),
- In 1984, at first reserve board in the 26th Chess Olympiad in Thessaloniki (+0, =3, -4).

In 1981, Shaw was awarded the FIDE International Master (IM) title. In 2021, Shaw had a book published about him called Terrey Shaw: Australian Chess Ironman.

== Books ==
- Ian Rogers; Ralph Shaw (2021). Terrey Shaw - Australian Chess Ironman. Australian Chess Enterprises.
