= Oceania Chess Championship =

Regional chess competitions

Leading chess players from the FIDE Oceania Zone 3.6 are allowed to play in the Oceania Chess Championships. The tournament is conducted by the FIDE Oceania Zone President and Oceania Chess Confederation under the auspices of the world chess federation, FIDE.

== History ==
Before January 2012, the Oceania Chess Championship was scheduled as part of the FIDE World Chess Championship cycle, and winners qualified to represent the FIDE Oceania Zone at the Chess World Cup. Since 2012 the Oceania Chess Championship has been held every year, with only each alternate (odd numbered) year acting as the Oceania Zone Championship and Chess World Cup qualifier. In these years, the title of International Master (IM) is awarded to the winner(s) of the Oceania Zone Championship event, as per the FIDE title regulations.

The first Oceania Chess Championship was organised by the inaugural Oceania Zone President, Graeme Gardiner, on the Gold Coast, Australia in 1999. Vladimir Feldman of Australia won the event, undefeated, with a score of 7/9. In May 2000, an additional Oceania Zonal Chess Championship was held to coincide with changes in the schedule of the FIDE World Chess Championship cycle. Only an open event was held that year, without a separate women's championship, and was won by Aleksandar Wohl with a score of 7.5/9.

In 2001, Mikhail Gluzman and Mark Chapman shared first place with a score of 7/9, but the former won a rapid chess play-off match and the title. In 2011 the Women's event resulted in a tie between Irina Berezina and Emma Guo. A playoff match was held later in the year in Sydney, and was won by Berezina with a score of 2.5/3. The 2013 Women's event again resulted in a tie between Irina Berezina and Emma Guo. Berezina won the playoff match, at the end of the tournament, with a score of 2/2. In 2015, untitled player Brodie McClymont beat IM Max Illingworth in the last round to catch him for 1st= with scores of 7.5/9, which means an automatic IM title. Illingworth beat McClymont 1.5–0.5 in the rapid chess playoff match for Zonal Champion.

== Oceania Chess Champions ==
Year	City	Open Champion	Women's Champion
1999	Gold Coast	Vladimir Feldman (Australia)	Laura Moylan (Australia)
2000	Auckland	Aleksandar Wohl (Australia)	
2001	Gold Coast	Mikhail Gluzman (Australia)	Ngan Phan-Koshnitsky (Australia)
2002	Coral Coast, Fiji	Darryl Johansen (Australia)	Irina Berezina (Australia)
2005	Auckland	Gary Lane (Australia)	Irina Berezina (Australia)
2007	Denarau	Zong-Yuan Zhao (Australia)	Irina Berezina (Australia)
2009	Gold Coast	David Smerdon (Australia)	Arianne Caoili (Australia)
2011	Rotorua	Zong-Yuan Zhao (Australia)	Irina Berezina (Australia)
2012	Queenstown	Darryl Johansen (Australia)	Helen Milligan (New Zealand)
2013	Nadi	Igor Bjelobrk (Australia)	Irina Berezina (Australia)
2014	Ballarat	Christopher Wallis (Australia)	Vineetha Wijesuriya (Australia)
2015	Sydney	Max Illingworth (Australia)	Emma Guo (Australia)
2016	Auckland	Aleksei Kulashko (New Zealand)	Heather Richards (Australia)
2017	Auckland	Anton Smirnov (Australia)	Layla Timergazi (New Zealand)
2019	Guam	Max Illingworth (Australia)	Julia Ryjanova (Australia)
2021	Online chess	Temur Kuybokarov (Australia)	Julia Ryjanova (Australia)
2023	Melbourne	Temur Kuybokarov (Australia)	Julia Ryjanova (Australia)

== Oceania Senior Chess Champions ==
Year	City	Senior Champion	Senior Women's Champion
2010	Christchurch	Brian Jones (Australia)	Vivian Smith (New Zealand)
2011	Melbourne	Mirko Rujevic (Australia)	Vivian Smith (New Zealand)
2012	Parramatta	Anthonie Luchtmeijer (Australia)	Helen Milligan (New Zealand)
2013	Christchurch	David Lovejoy (Australia)	Helen Milligan (New Zealand)
2014	Sydney	Gary Lane (Australia)	Vivian Smith (New Zealand)
2015	Auckland	Leonard McLaren (New Zealand)	Helen Milligan (New Zealand)
2016	Nadi	Gary Lane (Australia)	
2019	Auckland	Michael Steadman (New Zealand)	
2021	Noosa	Cancelled due to COVID	Cancelled due to COVID

== Oceania Youth Chess Champions ==
Year	City	Youth Champion	Youth Girls Champion
2023	Canberra	Cameron McGowan (Australia)	Lillian Lu (Australia)

== Oceania Presidents ==
Year	President
1998-2002	Graeme Gardiner (Australia)
2002-2010	Gary Bekker (Australia)
2010-2014	Brian Jones (Australia)
2014-2022	Paul Spiller (New Zealand)
2022-	Shaun Press (Papua New Guinea)
