= Julius Leigh Jacobsen =

English-born Australian chess player

Personal information
- Born: 28 May 1862 Hull, England
- Died: 1 June 1916 (aged 54) Royal Prince Alfred Hospital, Sydney, Australia

Chess career
- Country: Australia
- Title: Australian Chess Champion (1897)

Julius Leigh Jacobsen (28 May 1862 – 1 June 1916) was an English-born, Australian chess player who won the Australian Chess Championship in 1897 and the New South Wales Championship in 1901. He was also the tutor of William Samuel Viner, who later became the Australian Chess Champion himself.

== Chess career ==
Jacobsen's chess prowess first came to public attention when he was fourteen, when he defeated some very strong English players, leading Wilhelm Steinitz to dub him the "boy prodigy". At the age of sixteen, he defeated Henry Bird (+4 -2 =1) in an April 1879 match. He then stopped playing chess and moved to what is now South Africa the following year; he arrived in Australia about six years later. In Australia, he resumed playing chess and became the country's national champion in 1897.

== Style ==
An article published in the Sydney Mail in 1897, shortly after Jacobsen's victory in that year's Australian Chess Championship, stated that "His style of play is very attractive to onlookers, and his chess combinations are rapidly conceived and brilliantly executed." His obituary in the Sydney Morning Herald said that his "...style was extremely brilliant, and he played rapidly even in complicated positions."
