= Narelle Kellner =

Australian chess player

Personal information
- Born: 18 October 1934
- Died: 20 December 1987 (aged 53) Hurstville, New South Wales, Australia

Chess career
- Country: Australia
- Title: Woman International Master (1977)

Narelle Kellner (née Jorgensen, 18 October 1934 – 20 December 1987) was an Australian chess player who held the title of Woman International Master (WIM, 1977). She was a two-time winner of the Australian Women's Chess Championship (1972, 1974).

== Chess career ==
Narelle Kellner won the Women's Chess Championships of New South Wales 21 times, and twice won the Australian Women's Chess Championship (1972, 1974). In 1977, she was awarded the FIDE Woman International Master (WIM) title.

She twice participated in the Women's World Chess Championship Interzonal Tournaments:

- In 1976, at the Women's Interzonal Tournament in Tbilisi, she finished 11th out of 11;
- In 1979, at the Women's Interzonal Tournament in Alicante, she finished 17th-18th out of 18.

She played for Australia in four Women's Chess Olympiads:

- In 1972, at first board in the 5th Chess Olympiad (women) in Skopje (+1, =3, -4),
- In 1976, at second board in the 7th Chess Olympiad (women) in Haifa (+3, =4, -2),
- In 1978, at second board in the 8th Chess Olympiad (women) in Buenos Aires (+4, =3, -4),
- In 1984, at second board in the 26th Chess Olympiad (women) in Thessaloniki (+3, =3, -5).

In 1986, she co-authored the first edition of Guide to Coaching Junior Chess Players with Kevin Harrison.

== Personal life and murder-suicide ==
Kellner worked as a primary school teacher. From 1961 she was married to John Vincent Kellner (1931–1987), an Australian correspondence chess champion and Correspondence International Master.

She died by suicide in the early hours of 20 December 1987.

Initially responding to reports of a house fire at the Kellners' address in Hurstville at around 4am on 20 December, firefighters found the decomposing body of Kellner's husband John Kellner in a bedroom. Narelle Kellner was found still alive but with a self-inflicted bullet wound to her forehead in the loungeroom. Kellner died from her injuries on the way to hospital. It was believed she had deliberately set fire to the house.

Police said they believed Kellner had murdered her seriously unwell husband about a week earlier and had been living in the house with his dead body. They indicated that they would be treating the deaths as a murder-suicide. Neighbours described the couple as reclusive. The president of the New South Wales Chess Association described the couple as an "odd pair who were suited to each other" and suggested the game of chess had become an obsession. Australian chess champion Ian Rogers claimed that John Kellner had previously suggested there had been conspiracies against him, which did not exist.

On 24 December 1987, a statement was issued by the Australian Chess Federation in which they said they wished to record their deep regret at the deaths of both John Kellner and Narelle Kellner before detailing their respective achievements.

Narelle Kellner was cremated at the Rookwood Crematorium on 5 January 1988.
