= Laura Moylan =

Australian chess player (born 1983)

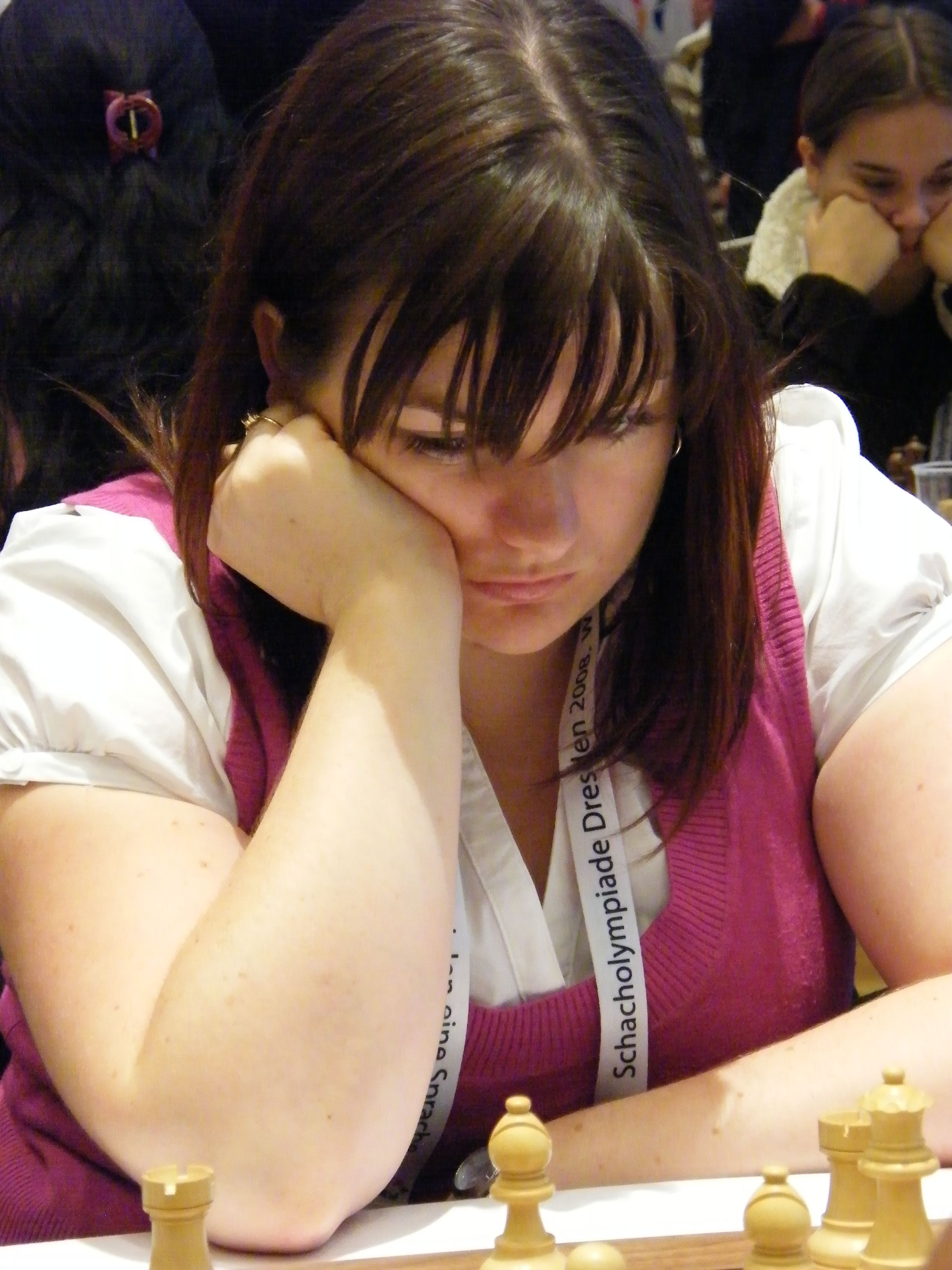
- Laura Moylan at the 38th Chess Olympiad in Dresden, Germany 2008.

Personal information
- Born: 1983 (age 42–43)

Chess career
- Country: Australia
- Title: Woman International Master (2000)
- FIDE rating: 2108 (January 2009)
- Peak rating: 2127 (April 2006)

Laura Moylan (born 1983) is an Australian chess Woman International Master (WIM).

Moylan represented Australia in the World Youth Chess Championship (Girls) each year from 1994 to 1999.

In 1995, aged 12, Moylan finished third in the Australian Under-18 Junior Girls Chess Championship. The following year she won the 1996 Australian Junior Girls Chess Championship. In 1999, she came second in the Australian Under-18 Junior Chess Championship (Open), held in Hervey Bay, behind David Smerdon.

Moylan gained the Woman International Master title after winning the 1999 Oceania Women's Zonal Chess Championship held on the Gold Coast, Queensland. She finished 3rd in the 2002 Oceania Women's Zonal Chess Championship.

Moylan has represented Australia at four Chess Olympiads in 2000, 2002, 2006, and 2008. In her 2000 Chess Olympiad debut, she scored 8/9, with a performance rating of 2416, and won the individual silver medal for her performance on the reserve board.

Moylan is a director of the "Sydney Academy of Chess" a chess coaching business in Sydney.
