= Trevor Tao =

Australian chess player (born 1977)

Personal information
- Born: November 22, 1977 (age 48) Adelaide, Australia

Chess career
- Country: Australia
- Title: International Master (2012)
- Peak rating: 2440 (March 2012)

Trevor Tao (born 22 November 1977) is an Australian chess player and mathematician.

== Chess career ==
In 1992, he won the Australian Junior Chess Championship.

In December 1994, he played for Australia on the first reserve board at the 31st Chess Olympiad, where he scored 4.5/8. His most notable result was holding a draw against American grandmaster Sergey Kudrin.

Tao has won the South Australian chess championship four times: in 1994, 1996, 1997 and 2006.

In October 2017, he was South Australia's top chess player and tied for first place with William Jordan in the Labor Day Weekender Tournament hosted by the South Australian Chess Association. He went undefeated in the tournament and had a score of 5/6, but lost the championship to Jordan on tiebreak scores.

In March 2018, he played in the O2C Doeberl Cup Premier. He got the strongest win of his career against Chinese grandmaster Ma Qun in the fifth round of the event.

== Personal life ==
He has two brothers, mathematician Terence and Nigel.

In 1995, he represented Australia in the International Mathematical Olympiad, where he scored 27/42 and won a bronze medal.

In 2005, he earned a PhD in applied mathematics from the University of Adelaide.
