= Bobby Cheng =

Australian chess grandmaster (born 1997)

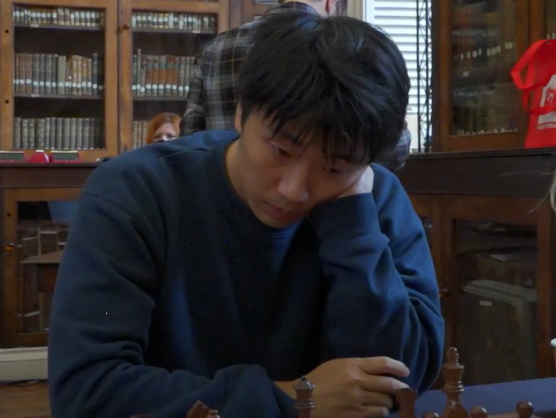
- Bobby Cheng in 2022

Personal information
- Born: 20 March 1997 (age 29) Hamilton, New Zealand

Chess career
- Country: New Zealand (until 2009); Australia (since 2009)
- Title: Grandmaster (2019)
- FIDE rating: 2573 (November 2026)
- Peak rating: 2596 (December 2024)

Bobby Cheng (born 20 March 1997) is a New Zealand-Australian chess grandmaster. Cheng was world champion in the under 12 category in 2009, the only Australian in history to win a world over-the-board title. Cheng won Australian Open championship in 2013 and Australian chess Championship in 2016. He was awarded the title of Grandmaster by FIDE in 2019.

== Biography and career ==
Cheng was born in Hamilton, New Zealand. His early trainers in New Zealand were Bruce Wheeler and Ewen Green, followed by Darryl Johansen after Cheng arrived in Australia.

He finished tied for third place in the Under 10 division of the World Youth Chess Championships in 2007, the year he and his family moved to Melbourne, Australia.

In November 2009, Cheng transferred national federations from New Zealand to Australia and won the Under 12 title at the World Youth Championships in Kemer, Turkey.

Cheng won the Australian Junior Championship in January 2010, at age 12, becoming the youngest player ever to do so, and won the same title again in 2011. Also in 2011, Cheng became the youngest ever winner of the Victorian Championship title, finishing ahead of Darryl Johansen. In 2012 Cheng tied for the Australian Masters title with Anton Smirnov. He played for the Australian team in the World Youth Under-16 Chess Olympiad in 2012 and 2013.

In January 2013, Cheng won the Australian Open Championship, the youngest player ever to do so. In January 2016, Cheng became the Australian champion in Melbourne. In 2018, he played on the Australian national team in the 43rd Chess Olympiad in Batumi, Georgia.

In December 2019, Cheng won the Australian Young Masters tournament with a perfect 9/9 score, ahead of top seed Norwegian Grandmaster Frode Urkedal.

In July 2021, Cheng was invited to the FIDE World Cup in Sochi. He was the first Australian in history to win a game in the World Cup after defeating Vahap Şanal in the rapid tiebreaks. In round 2, he received a walk over against Levon Aronian after Aronian had to forfeit his match due to displaying flu-like symptoms. Cheng was eliminated in the third round by the former Belarusian Vladislav Kovalev 1½−½.

In November 2025 Cheng participated in the Chess World Cup 2025, and was eliminated in round 2 by the Hungarian Peter Leko 1½−½.
