= Chess in Australia =

Chess has been recorded as played in Australia since the middle of the nineteenth century, during which a chess club was established in Melbourne.

The Australian Chess Federation consists of seven chess association members, corresponding to each of the six Australian states and the Australian Capital Territory. Regionally, it is associated with the Asian Chess Federation, Oceania Chess Confederation, and Australian chess players can compete in the Asian Chess Championship and Asian Junior Chess Championship, where the girls' championship has been held thrice in Adelaide.

The Australian Chess Championship is held every two years, and the Australian Women's Championship is held every year in which an open championship does not fall. The Australian Junior and Girls Championships are held every year by the ACF. The Australian Open, described by its organizers as one of Australia's "premier chess events", is open to players around the world.

Australia is also home to the Southern Hemisphere's largest collection of chess literature at the State Library Victoria, the MV Anderson Chess Collection. The MV Anderson Chess Collection contains 13,000 volumes of chess-related literature, and is home to numerous pieces of chess history such as an excerpt from the mid fifteenth century informational book The Game and Playe of the Chesse.

== Publications ==
- 50 Moves
- Australian Correspondence Chess Quarterly
- Australian Chess Magazine

== Notable players ==
- David Smerdon, grandmaster and senior lecturer at the University of Queensland
- Bobby Cheng, grandmaster and Australia No. 1 who dual-represents New Zealand

== See also ==
- Australian Chess Federation
- Women's chess in Australia
- List of chess openings named after places
