= Rishi Sardana =

Indian-Australian chess player (born 1997)

Personal information
- Born: October 5, 1997 (age 28) Canberra, Australia

Chess career
- Country: India (until 2013); Australia (since 2013)
- Title: International Master (2014)
- FIDE rating: 2506 (August 2026)
- Peak rating: 2518 (September 2026)

Rishi Sardana is an Indian-Australian chess player.

== Chess career ==
He was born in Canberra, and moved to India at the age of 7–8.

In January 2019, he won the Mumbai International GM Tournament by defeating Muthaiah Al in the final round.

In March 2019, he was the sole tournament leader of the DCA Open after the sixth round.

In January 2024, he won the Australian Chess Championship with an undefeated score of 9.5/11, including a win against Queensland champion Stephen Solomon. He later played for his country in the 45th Chess Olympiad in September 2024.

== Personal life ==
He attended the Shri Ram College of Commerce and works as a data consultant for KPMG Canberra.
