= Charles G. M. Watson =

Australian chess player

Charles Gilbert Marriott Watson (22 October 1878 – 5 March 1961) was an Australian national chess champion.

He was born in Buninyong, and started playing chess at the age of 10 with his father at the Ballarat Chess Club. He later joined the Melbourne Chess Club, and he won the Melbourne Chess Club championships in 1898, 1902, 1904, 1905, 1914, 1921, 1931 and 1936. He won the Australian Chess Championship in 1922, ending the run of William Samuel Viner, who had been champion since 1906. The Championship didn't return to Melbourne until 1931, when Watson again won the title.

Watson competed in the 1922 London international tournament, where almost all of the world top chessplayers of the time were participating. He finished 14th, having won 4 and a half games from fifteen. He had victories over Canadian John Morrison, Italian Davide Marotti, Englishman Henry Ernest Atkins and Hungarian Richard Réti.
