= Igor Bjelobrk =

Australian chess player (born 1982)

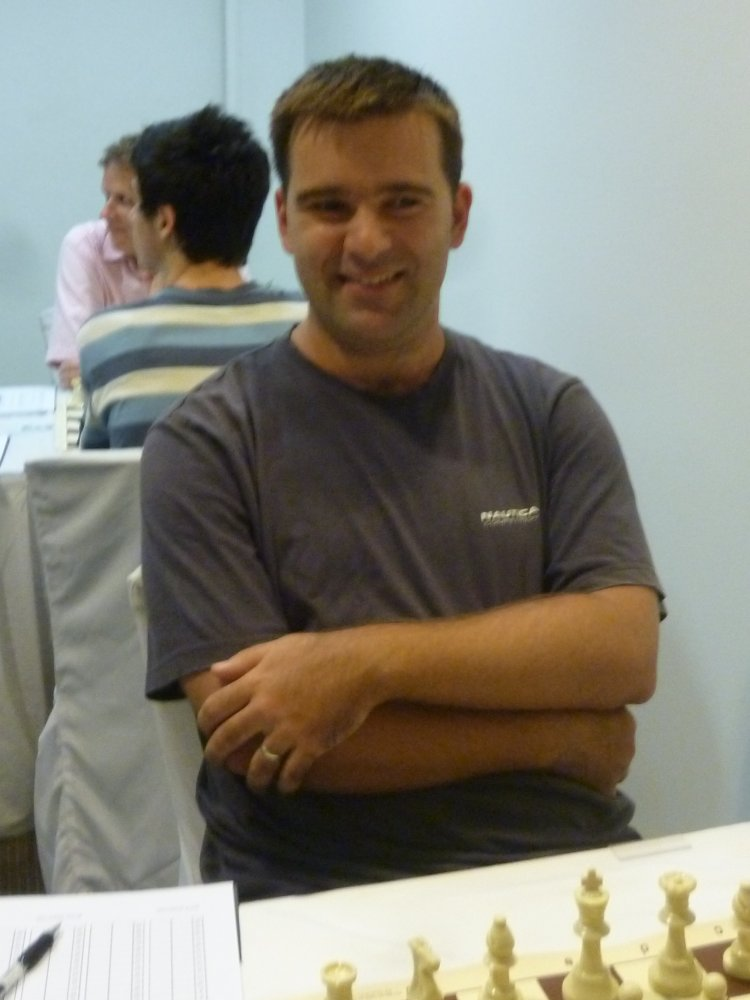
- Igor Bjelobrk at the Oceania Zonal Chess Championship, Sonaisali Island, Fiji 2013.

Personal information
- Born: 11 January 1982 (age 44) Split, SR Croatia, SFR Yugoslavia

Chess career
- Country: New Zealand (until 2007); Australia (since 2007)
- Title: International Master (2013)
- Peak rating: 2407 (February 2020)

Igor Bjelobrk (born 11 January 1982) is an Australian chess International Master (IM). He gained the International Master title after winning the 2013 Oceania Zonal Chess Championship held on Sonaisali Island, Fiji.

Bjelobrk moved to New Zealand in 1993 and began playing chess the following year at the age of 12. He won the New Zealand Junior Championship twice and represented New Zealand in 1998 World Junior Chess Championship in Kozhikode, Calicut, India.

Bjelobrk moved to Australia in 2000, but represented New Zealand at the 35th Chess Olympiad in Bled, Slovenia in 2002 where he scored 3.5 points from 9 games.

He scored 5.5/9 in the 2005 Oceania Zonal Chess Championship in Auckland, and was awarded the FIDE Master title later that year, based on his rating which had been over the required level of 2300 since July 2003.

Bjelobrk scored 6/9 and came 5th in the 2007 Oceania Zonal Chess Championship in Fiji. He scored 6.5/9 and came 2nd with GM Zong-Yuan Zhao, IM Stephen Solomon, James Morris and others in the 2009 Oceania Zonal Chess Championship on the Gold Coast, Australia, narrowly missing out on an IM title result. James Morris was awarded the IM title for his result in the event on tiebreak.

After winning the 2013 Oceania Zonal Chess Championship, with a score of 7.5/9, Bjelobrk represented Australia at the 2013 FIDE Chess World Cup held in Tromsø, Norway in August 2013, losing in the first round to fourth seed Alexander Grischuk.

Bjelobrk won the 2022 New South Wales Open, with a score of 6.5/7

Bjelobrk lives in Sydney, Australia with his wife Ingela who is also an expert chess player and their two children; Lucas and Alicia.
