= Zhao Zong-Yuan =

Australian chess grandmaster (born 1986)

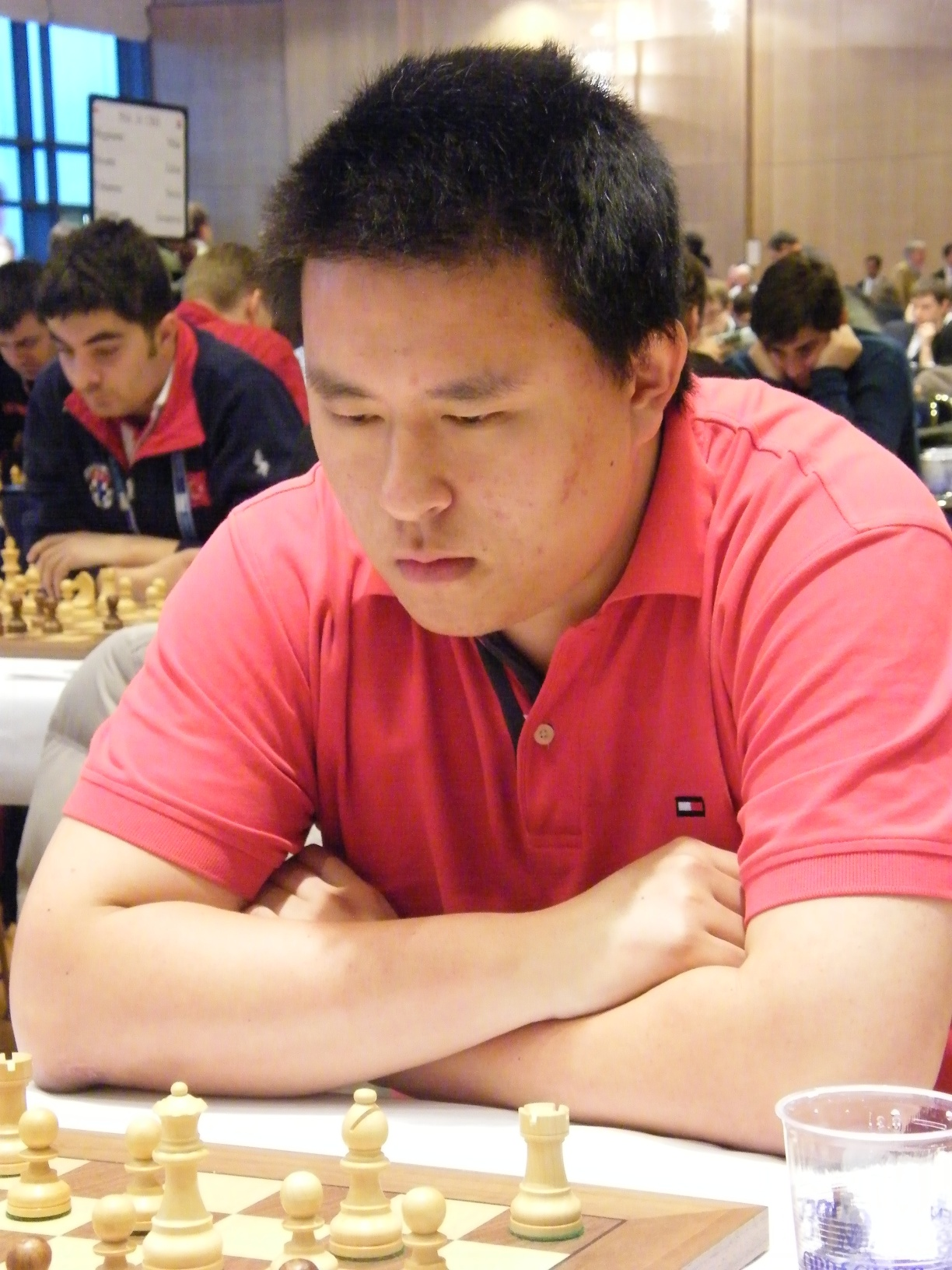

Personal information
- Born: 26 June 1986 (age 40) Beijing, China

Chess career
- Country: Australia
- Title: Grandmaster (2008)
- FIDE rating: 2409 (July 2026)
- Peak rating: 2592 (March 2010)

Zhao Zong-Yuan (simplified Chinese: 赵宗辕; traditional Chinese: 趙宗轅; pinyin: Zhào Zōngyuán; born 26 June 1986) is an Australian chess Grandmaster. As of September 2019, he was the third-ranked active chess player in Australia.

== Early life ==
Zhao was born in Beijing. He grew up in Coffs Harbour, Australia, a pharmacy graduate from the University of Sydney. He has since completed his degree in medicine at the same university.

== Chess career ==
Zhao became the youngest Australian international master at the age of 14, and was a member of the NSW Junior Chess League.

Zhao won the 1999 Queensland Under-18 Championship with a score of 8/8 and then finished just half a point behind Darryl Johansen in the Australian Championship proper, ending with a remarkable 4/4 burst. In 2000, he finished second to Aleksandar Wohl in the Oceania Zonal and in 2001 won the Australian Junior Championship. He played in the 2001 British Championship and scored 6/11. In 2004 he won the Doeberl Cup with 6/7 ahead of Ian Rogers, David Smerdon, Johansen and Gary Lane. In 2005 he won the Australian Junior Masters with a 9/9 score. He has represented his country in three Olympiads and in 2006 was on board three.

In January 2007, Zhao won the Australian Open with 9.5/11 points with a 2673 performance rating. In May 2007, he was first at the 2007 Oceania Zonal in Fiji with 7/9 points, ahead of New Zealander Puchen Wang. This enabled him to qualify for the 2007 FIDE World Cup in Khanty Mansiysk, Russia, where he was knocked out in the first round by Magnus Carlsen (0–2). In July 2007, he won the Australian National University Open with a score of 6/7. He won the Oceania Chess Championship again in 2011 with a score of 8.5/9 and represented the Oceania Zone at the Chess World Cup 2011 where he was eliminated by Evgeny Tomashevsky.

Zhao achieved all three of the required grandmaster (GM) norms over two months in December 2007 and January 2008. Zhao scored 7/9 earning his first GM norm in the First Saturday chess tournament (1–10 December 2007) in Budapest, Hungary. Zhao earned his second GM norm by convincingly winning with 6.5 points the VII Festival Internacional de Ajedrez GEMA tournament (10th category round-robin) which was held from 26 December 2007 until 5 January 2008 in Mondariz Balneario (Pontevedra), Spain. In his third attempt, which was unsuccessful, Zhao played in the 33rd Seville Open/XXXIII Abierto Internacional "Ciudad de Sevilla" (5–12 January 2008) Sevilla, Spain finishing with 6.5/9 points (=10th place). In 22–31 January 2008 he managed to achieve his final GM norm at the 2008 Gibtelecom Chess Festival in Gibraltar. By also achieving a rating over 2500 he thus qualified for the title of Grandmaster. Zhao is Australia's third grandmaster, after Ian Rogers and Darryl Johansen.

After GM Rogers, Australia's previous #1, retired, Zhao played top board in the 2008 Chess Olympiad in Dresden, where he scored 6.5/10 with a performance rating of 2620, the best performance rating of the team. He again played top board for Australia in the 2010 Chess Olympiad held in Khanty Mansiysk, Russia where he scored 5/9.
