= Serge Rubanraut =

Australian chess player

Serge Rubanraut (16 March 1948, in Shanghai – 12 October 2008, in Sydney) was an Australian chess master.

He won Australian Chess Championship at Sydney 1976, and represented Australia in the 22nd Chess Olympiad at Haifa 1976. He died at the age of 60 from a heart attack, and was buried in the Jewish section of Rookwood Cemetery, Sydney.
