= Lynda Pope =

Australian chess player (born 1953)

Personal information
- Born: 19 April 1953 (age 73)

Chess career
- Country: Australia
- Title: Woman International Master (1972)
- Peak rating: 2040 (January 1990)

Lynda Pope (née Maddern, born 19 April 1953) is an Australian chess player who holds the title of Woman International Master (WIM, 1972). She is a winner of the Australian Women's Chess Championship (1978).

== Biography ==
Lynda started playing chess at the age of 13 at the school in Kyneton. At the age of 18, she won the Women's Chess Championship of the state of Victoria. In 1971 and 1972 Lynda twice won the Australian Girls Championships. In the 1970s she was one of the leading Australian women's chess players. In 1973, she participated in the Women's World Chess Championship Interzonal Tournament in Menorca and shared 17th-18th place. In 1978, Lynda Pope won Australian Women's Chess Championship.

Lynda Pope played for Australia in the Women's Chess Olympiads:

- In 1972, at first reserve board in the 5th Chess Olympiad (women) in Skopje (+1, =2, -3).
- In 1976, at third board in the 7th Chess Olympiad (women) in Haifa (+2, =3, -4),
- In 1978, at first board in the 8th Chess Olympiad (women) in Buenos Aires (+2, =2, -6).

In 1972, she was awarded the FIDE Woman International Master (WIM) title. She is married to chess player Arthur Pope.
