= David Smerdon =

Australian chess grandmaster (born 1984)

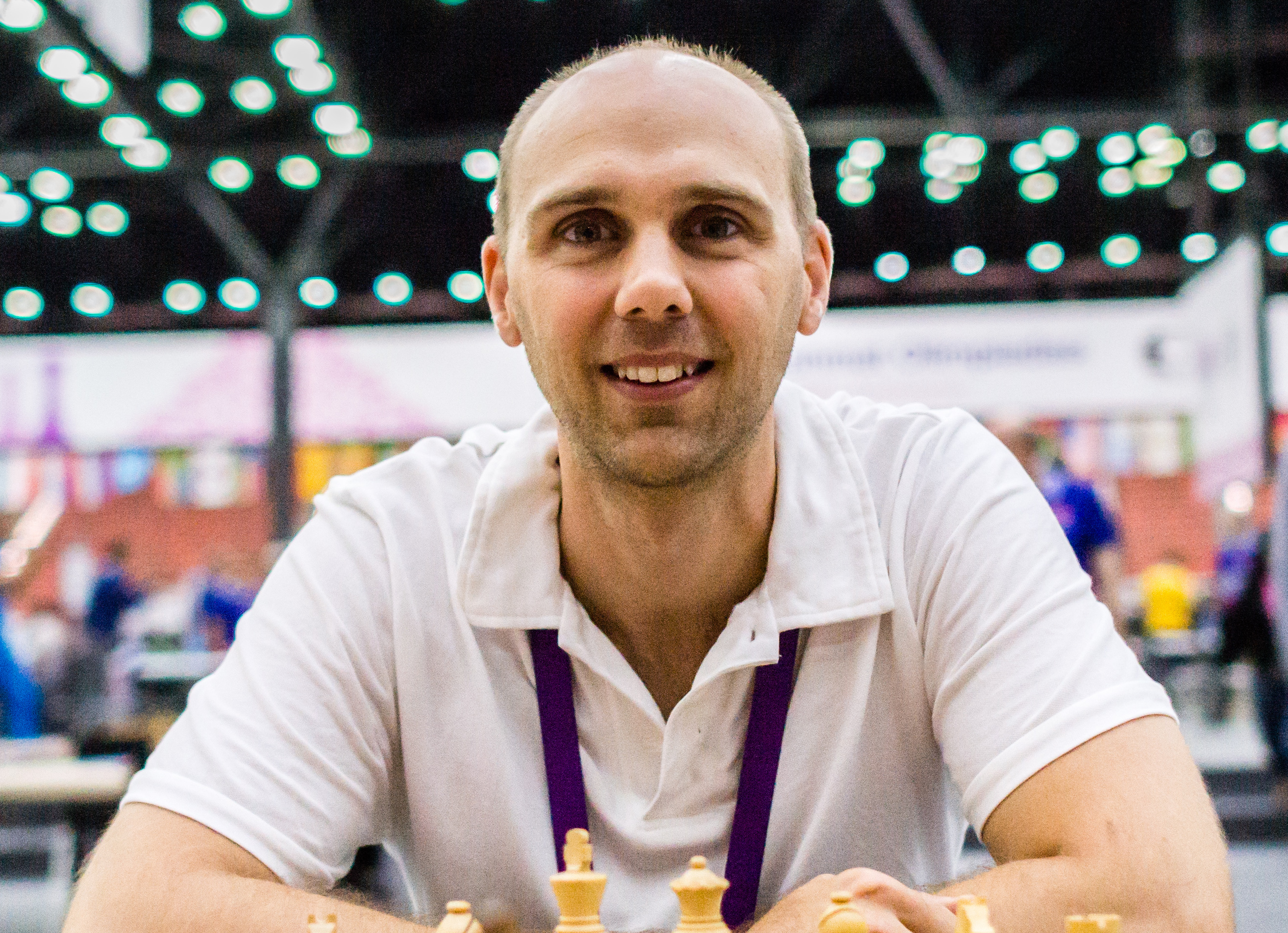

Personal information
- Born: David Craig Smerdon; 17 September 1984 (age 41) Brisbane, Australia

Chess career
- Country: Australia
- Title: Grandmaster (2009)
- FIDE rating: 2460 (July 2026)
- Peak rating: 2533 (November 2016)

David Craig Smerdon (born 17 September 1984) is an Australian chess player and economist who holds the FIDE title of Grandmaster (GM). He is the seventh highest ranked chess player of Australia. Smerdon has played for the Australian team in the Chess Olympiad since 2004. He currently is working as a coach at Anglican Church Grammar School, his former school.

== Chess career ==
Smerdon was awarded the title of Grandmaster (GM) by FIDE in 2009. He achieved the norms required for the title at the Australian championship in 2005, the 7th Bangkok Chess Club Open, which he won in 2007 with a score of 7½/9 points, and the Czech Open in Pardubice, Czech Republic in 2007. He fulfilled the last requirement for the title when his rating passed 2500 in the FIDE rating list of July 2009. Smerdon is the fourth Australian to become a grandmaster, after Ian Rogers, Darryl Johansen and Zhao Zong-Yuan.

In 2009, he won the Queenstown Chess Classic tournament and the Oceania Chess Championship with a score of 7½/9 points. The latter victory qualified him to play in the Chess World Cup 2009. In this event he was knocked out by Leinier Domínguez in the first round.

He has also introduced what he calls the Fighting Chess Index to provide a comparative metric for the amount of drawing top Chess players do.

== Education and academic career ==
Smerdon was educated at the Anglican Church Grammar School and the University of Melbourne, where he was a resident student at Trinity College.

Smerdon is the recipient of a 2011 John Monash Scholarship, awarded by the General Sir John Monash Foundation named after General Sir John Monash. From 2013–2017, he earned a Ph.D. in economics at the University of Amsterdam and Tinbergen Institute under Theo Offerman for a thesis: “Everybody’s doing it: Essays on trust, social norms and integration.” He worked as a senior lecturer at the University of Queensland, with areas of research in Applied Economics; Economic Development and Growth; Experimental, Behavioural, and Evolutionary Methods.

== Books ==
- Smerdon, David (2015). Smerdon's Scandinavian. Everyman Chess. ISBN 9781781942949.
- Smerdon, David (2020). The Complete Chess Swindler. New In Chess. ISBN 9789056919115
