= Fred Flatow =

Australian chess player (born 1937)

Personal information
- Born: 28 August 1937 (age 88) Berlin, Germany

Chess career
- Country: Australia
- Title: FIDE Master (1989)
- Peak rating: 2380 (July 1971)

Alfred "Fred" Flatow (born 28 August 1937 in Berlin) is an Australian chess FIDE Master and former Australian Chess Champion.

Flatow was born in Germany and emigrated to Australia. He was City of Sydney Champion eleven times (1963, 1967, 1968 (jointly), 1969, 1970, 1972, 1975 (jointly), 1981 (jointly), 1982, 1983, and 1985), and won the Australian Chess Championship in Sydney 1969/70. He also won the Doeberl Cup in Canberra three times (1970 (jointly), 1972, 1979).

He twice played for Australia in Chess Olympiads (Lugano 1968 and Skopje 1972).
