= Trevor Hay =

Australian chess player

Personal information
- Born: 17 October 1945 Wagga Wagga, New South Wales, Australia
- Died: 12 August 2016 (aged 70)

Chess career
- Country: Australia

Trevor Hay (17 October 1945 – 12 August 2016) was an Australian chess player and winner of the Australian Chess Championship in 1972.

== Biography ==
Trevor Hay was one of the strongest chess players in Australia in the 1960s and 1970s. He won NSW Junior Chess Championship in 1961. Trevor Hay participated in Australian Chess Championships and won gold (1972) and silver (1963) medals. Also he won Australian Open Chess Championship in 1977.

Trevor Hay played for Australia in the Chess Olympiads:

- In 1964, at first reserve board in the 16th Chess Olympiad in Tel Aviv (+5, =3, -1),
- In 1972, at third board in the 20th Chess Olympiad in Skopje (+8, =1, -1).
