= Anne Slavotinek =

Australian chess player

Personal information
- Born: 13 May 1963 (age 63)

Chess career
- Country: Australia
- Title: Woman International Master (1985)

Anne Slavotinek (born 13 May 1963) is an Australian chess player. She holds the title of Woman International Master, and won the Australian Women's Chess Championship twice, in 1982 and 1984.

== Chess career ==
Slavotinek won the Australian Women's Chess Championship twice: in 1982 and 1984. In 1981, in Baguio she participated in Women's World Chess Championship Asian Pacific Zonal tournament and finished in 10th place. Together with the Australian team, she won the Telechess Olympiad in 1990.

Slavotinek played for Australia in the Women's Chess Olympiads:

- In 1980, at third board in the 9th Chess Olympiad (women) in Valletta (+4, =2, -4),
- In 1982, at first board in the 10th Chess Olympiad (women) in Lucerne (+5, =1, -5),
- In 1984, at first board in the 26th Chess Olympiad (women) in Thessaloniki (+5, =3, -2),
- In 1988, at first board in the 28th Chess Olympiad (women) in Thessaloniki (+5, =5, -4).

In 1985, she was awarded the FIDE Women International Master (WIM) title.

== Work in medicine ==
Slavotinek is a medical doctor who specialises in medical genetics and physician science. As of 2026, she works at the University of California, San Francisco, in medical genetics projects.
