= Marion Mott =

Australian chess player

Personal information
- Born: 6 February 1940
- Died: 9 February 2023 (aged 83) Adelaide

Chess career
- Country: Australia
- Peak rating: 2020 (January 1987)

Marion Mott (6 February 1940 – 9 February 2023), née McGrath, was an Australian chess player. She was a four-time winner of the Australian Women's Chess Championship (1966, 1969, 1976, 1980).

== Biography ==
From the 1960s to the 1980s, Marion McGrath (later Marion Mott) was one of Australia's leading female chess players. She won the New South Wales Women's Chess Championship in 1962, and the Australian Women's Chess Championship in 1966.

In 1967, she became first Australian to play in the Women's World Chess Championship Candidates Tournament, where she finished 16th out of 18 players.

She won the Australian Women's Championship three more times: in 1969, 1976 and 1980. She later settled in Adelaide and won the South Australian Women's Championship four times: 1983 (shared), 1986, 1987 and 1989.

She played for Australia in the Women's Chess Olympiads:

- In 1972, at second board in the 5th Chess Olympiad (women) in Skopje (+2, =3, -3),
- In 1976, at first board in the 7th Chess Olympiad (women) in Haifa (+1, =3, -5),
- In 1978, at third board in the 8th Chess Olympiad (women) in Buenos Aires (+4, =3, -4),
- In 1980, at first board in the 9th Chess Olympiad (women) in Valletta (+2, =6, -3),
- In 1984, at third board in the 26th Chess Olympiad (women) in Thessaloniki (+3, =2, -5),
- In 1986, at first reserve board in the 27th Chess Olympiad (women) in Dubai (+2, =4, -3).

Mott died in Adelaide in 2023.
