= Stephen Solomon =

Australian chess International Master (born 1963)

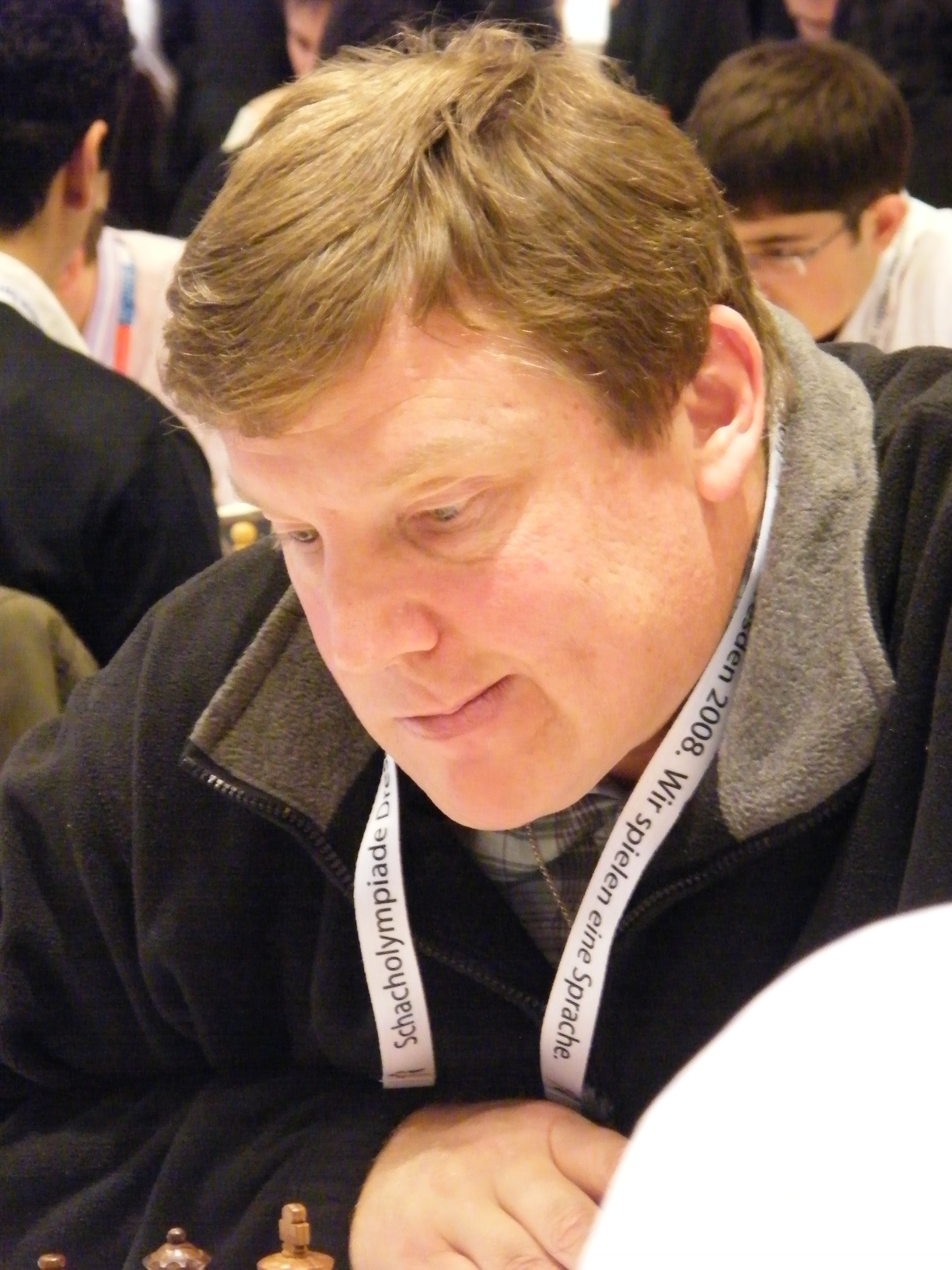
- Stephen Solomon at the 38th Chess Olympiad in Dresden, Germany 2008

Personal information
- Born: 24 July 1963 (age 63) Melbourne, Australia

Chess career
- Country: Australia
- Title: International Master (1990)
- Peak rating: 2478 (July 2008)

Stephen John Solomon (born 24 July 1963) is an Australian chess International Master (IM). He became a FIDE Master (FM) in 1986, and an International Master (IM) in 1990. He won the Australian Junior Chess Championship in 1980 and the Australian Chess Championship in 2008.

== Chess career ==
Solomon learnt to play chess when he was six years old from his parents, who were both chess players. His early successes included several Victorian Junior Championship victories, and winning the Australian Junior Championship in Canberra in 1980. His family moved to Queensland in 1985 and he has been based there since.

Solomon has represented Australia in ten Chess Olympiads between 1984 and 2012, usually on board 3 (four times), or board 4 (four times), although he played top board in the 1998 Olympiad in Elista.

He has won or jointly won the Australian Masters international chess tournament seven times between since 1989, most recently in 2009 and 2010. He also won the 2004 Victorian Masters and 2004 Hardy's Classic.

Solomon tied for first place with Darryl Johansen in the 1984 Australian Chess Championship but lost the play-off match. He won the Australian Chess Championship in 2008 however, since first-placed GM Dejan Antic was not eligible for the title.

Solomon won the 2006, 2007, 2011 and 2012 Queensland championships and the 2009 Queensland Open.

Solomon competed in the Oceania Zonal Chess Championships of 2005 (Auckland) and 2009 (Gold Coast), finishing =2nd with a score of 6.5/9 in the 2009 event.

Solomon's consistent results in Australian weekenders have won him the Australian Grand Prix in 1990, 1997, 1999, 2001, 2008 and 2011. He was also awarded the Steiner Medal for Australian Chess Player of the Year in 1997. Solomon currently lives in Queensland and he is married to Janeen Solomon, 1989 Queensland Women's Chess Champion.

== Notable games ==
- Stephen Solomon vs Anthony Miles, Australian Championship (1991), Modern Defence: Accelerated Gurgenidze, (B07), 1-0
- Stephen Solomon vs Gawain Jones, Australian Championship (2010), Sicilian Defense: Dragon Variation, (B70), 1-0
