= Aleksandar Wohl =

Australian chess player (born 1963)

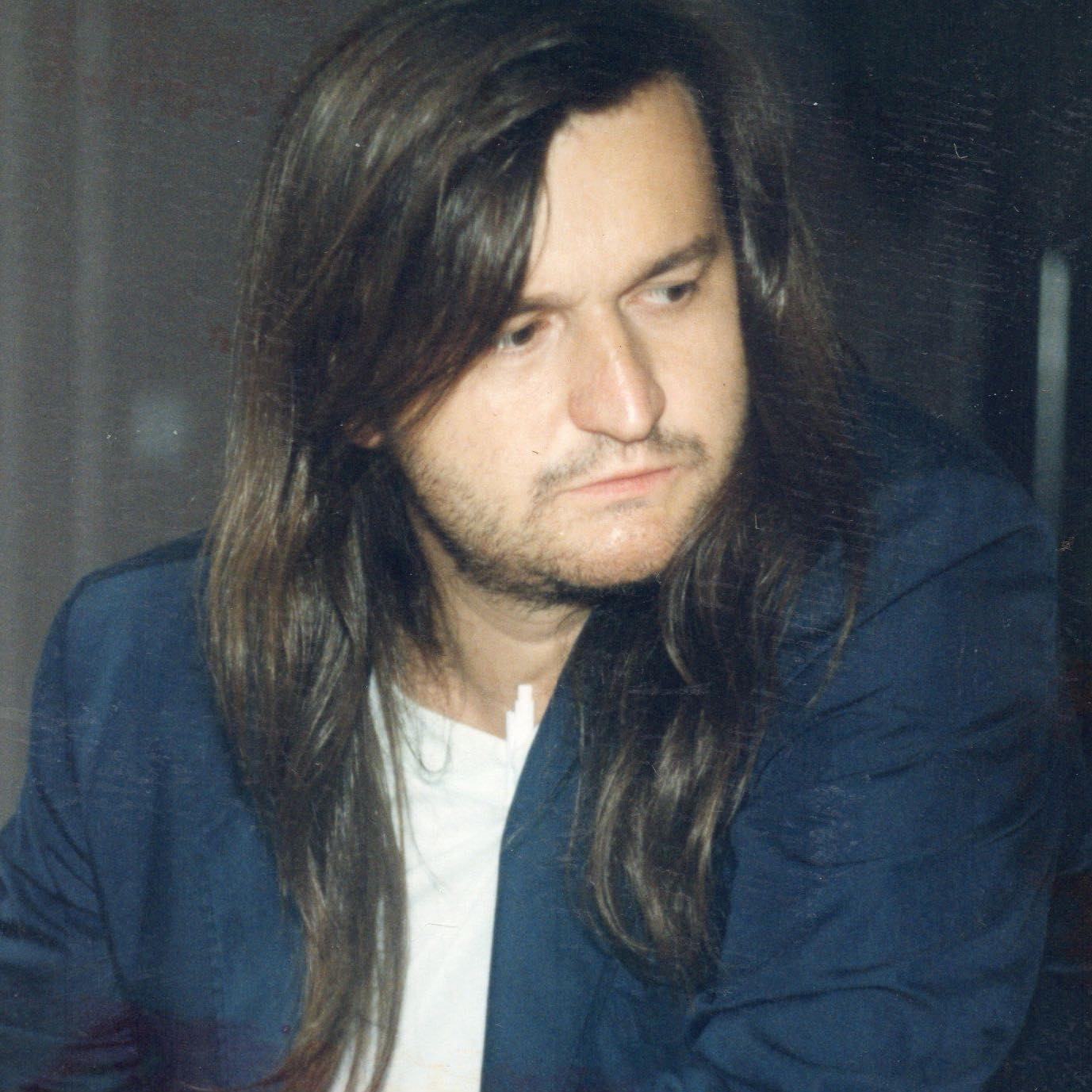

Personal information
- Born: Aleksandar H. Wohl; 21 July 1963 (age 63) Rijeka, Yugoslavia

Chess career
- Country: Australia
- Title: International Master (1994)
- Peak rating: 2461 (July 2000)

Aleksandar H. Wohl (born 21 July 1963) is an Australian chess player. He was awarded the title of International Master by FIDE in 1994.

== Chess career ==
Wohl won the Australian championship in 1992 ahead of English Grandmaster Tony Miles. In 1989 and 2009 he tied for first place at the Australian Open Championship. Wohl for team Australia in the Chess Olympiads of 1992, 1996, 2000, 2002, 2006 and 2012.

In 2000 he won the Oceania zonal championship, qualifying for the FIDE World Chess Championship 2000. He was knocked out in the first round by Aleksandr Galkin.

Other successful performances include first place in the 38th Doeberl Cup in Canberra 2000, joint first with Ian Rogers in the 43rd Doeberl Cup in 2005, joint first with Eduard Fomichenko in the 11th Vins du Medoc International Open 2008, first in the Schlosspark Open 2009 and first at Munich 2010. He finished in fifth position at the Commonwealth championship 2017, held at New Delhi, India. He has also won the Munich Open Chess tournament 5 Times

== Notable games ==
- Anthony Miles vs Aleksandar H Wohl, AUS 1991, English Opening: King's English Variation, (A25), 0-1
- Aleksandar H Wohl vs Ian Rogers, AUS 1993, Spanish Game: Morphy Defense, Archangelsk Variation (C78), 1-0
- Aleksandar H Wohl vs Aivars Gipslis, It (open) 1996, English Opening: Symmetrical Variation. Hedgehog Defense (A30), 1-0
- Aleksandar H Wohl vs Irisberto Herrera, Guillermo Garcia Mem Alfil 2001, Indian Game: Tartakower Attack (A45), 1-0
- Aleksandar H Wohl vs Mark Paragua, Asian Championships 2001, Indian Game: Kingside Fianchetto (A48), 1-0
