= John-Paul Wallace =

Australian chess player

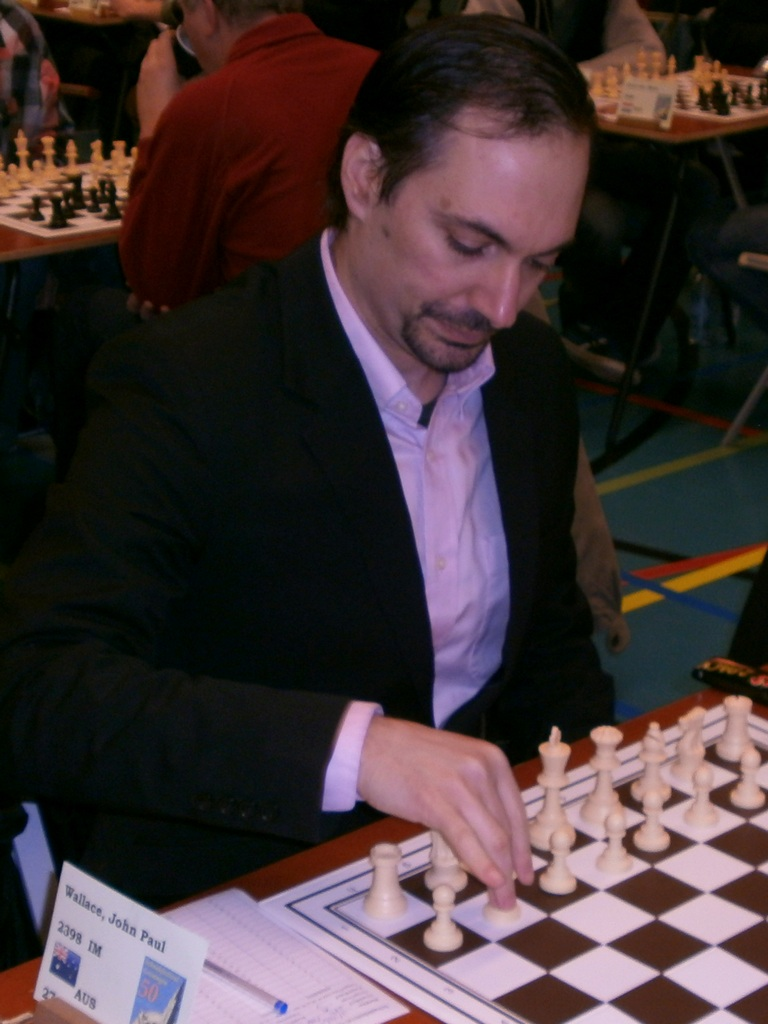
- John-Paul Wallace, Groningen 2012

Personal information
- Born: 19 November 1976 (age 49) Liverpool, Australia

Chess career
- Country: Australia (until 2023); Norway (since 2023)
- Title: International Master (1996)
- Peak rating: 2419 (July 2006)

John-Paul Wallace (born 19 November 1976 in Liverpool, New South Wales) is a professional chess player awarded the title of International Master in 1996 by FIDE (World Chess Federation).

He has represented Australia in two Chess Olympiads in Moscow, Russia in 1994 and Yerevan, Armenia in 1996.

He holds the record for the youngest Australian chess champion to date. He achieved this in the 1993/94 Australian Chess Championship at the age of 17. He won the Pratt Foundation Australian Open chess tournament in 2003 before moving to Europe and currently resides in London.

In February 2023, after many years without strong tournament performances, John-Paul won the Kragero Open in Norway ahead of 12 Grandmasters and scored a GM norm -http://turneringsservice.sjakklubb.no/standings.aspx?TID=KrageroResortChessInternationa2023-KrageroSjakklubbUngdom

John-Paul works as a professional chess coach and is a contributor to various magazines and websites including chesspublishing.com and chesslecture.com. John-Paul is a co-director of Wallace Chess Ltd.
