= Australian Chess Championship =

Chess competition in Australia

The Australian Chess Championship is a tournament organised by the Australian Chess Federation and held every two years. The tournament is largely restricted to Australian chess players, although it is common to allow a small number of strong overseas players to compete. The highest-scoring eligible player (frequently the tournament winner) holds the title of Australian Chess Champion until the next tournament is held. The tournament format is normally a restricted Swiss system, and in case of a tie for first place, a playoff match or tournament is conducted.

Since 1971, the Australian Open has been held in the intervening years. This event is open to all players, regardless of nationality, and the winner holds the title of Australian Open Champion.

The Australian Junior Championship and Australian Girls Championship are held annually. The Australian Women's Championship was previously organised as a separate tournament but current regulations award the title of Australian Women's Champion to the highest placed Australian female player in the Australian Open (dependent on a minimum number of female entries).

== Australian Champions ==
Prior to 2008, the tournament usually began in late December (after Christmas) and finished in January. Since 2008, the tournament has usually been held entirely in January. In the table, the year refers to the date the tournament finished.

| Year | Location | Winners |
|---|---|---|
| 1885 | Melbourne | Frederick Karl Esling (won one match game before George Hatfeild Dingley Gossip defaulted) |
| 1887 | Adelaide | Henry Charlick |
| 1888 | Melbourne | William Crane |
| 1893 | Sydney | Albert Edward Noble Wallace |
| 1895 | Melbourne | Albert Edward Noble Wallace |
| 1896 | Sydney | Albert Edward Noble Wallace |
| 1897(1) | Warrnambool | William Crane |
| 1897(2) | Sydney | Julius Leigh Jacobsen |
| 1906 | Perth | William Samuel Viner |
| 1912 | Sydney | William Samuel Viner |
| 1913 | Bellingen | William Samuel Viner |
| 1922 | Melbourne | Charles Gilbert Marriott Watson |
| 1924 | Brisbane | William Samuel Viner |
| 1926 | Sydney | Spencer Crakanthorp |
| 1927 | Perth | Spencer Crakanthorp |
| 1931 | Melbourne | Charles Gilbert Marriott Watson |
| 1933 | Sydney | Gary Koshnitsky |
| 1935 | Melbourne | C.J.S. Purdy |
| 1937 | Perth | C.J.S. Purdy |
| 1939 | Sydney | Gary Koshnitsky |
| 1945 | Sydney | Lajos Steiner |
| 1947 | Adelaide | Lajos Steiner |
| 1949 | Melbourne | C.J.S. Purdy |
| 1951 | Brisbane | C.J.S. Purdy |
| 1953 | Hobart | Lajos Steiner |
| 1955 | Perth | John Purdy |
| 1957 | Melbourne | Karlis Ozols / Lazare Suchowolski (Suchowolski emigrated to Israel before a playoff could be arranged) |
| 1959 | Hobart | Lajos Steiner |
| 1960 | Adelaide | Lucius Endzelins |
| 1963 | Perth | John Purdy |
| 1965 | Hobart | Douglas Hamilton |
| 1967 | Brisbane | Douglas Hamilton |
| 1969 | Melbourne | Walter Browne |
| 1970 | Sydney | Alfred Flatow |
| 1972 | Melbourne | Maxwell Fuller / Trevor Hay (playoff match tied 5–5) |
| 1974 | Cooma | Robert Murray Jamieson |
| 1976 | Sydney | Serge Rubanraut |
| 1978 | Perth | Robert Murray Jamieson |
| 1980 | Adelaide | Ian Rogers |
| 1982 | Melbourne | Douglas Hamilton |
| 1984 | Sydney | Darryl Johansen |
| 1986 | Toowoomba | Ian Rogers |
| 1988 | Gosford | Darryl Johansen |
| 1990 | Sydney | Darryl Johansen |
| 1992 | Melbourne | Aleksandar Wohl |
| 1994 | Melbourne | John-Paul Wallace |
| 1996 | Sydney | Guy West |
| 1998 | Melbourne | Ian Rogers |
| 2000 | Tumbi Umbi | Darryl Johansen |
| 2002 | Melbourne | Darryl Johansen |
| 2004 | Adelaide | Gary Lane |
| 2006 | Brisbane | Ian Rogers |
| 2008 | Parramatta | Stephen Solomon |
| 2010 | North Sydney | Zong-Yuan Zhao |
| 2012 | Geelong | Darryl Johansen |
| 2014 | Springvale | Max Illingworth |
| 2016 | Melbourne | Bobby Cheng |
| 2018 | North Sydney | Max Illingworth |
| 2020 | Sydney | Temur Kuybokarov |
| 2022 | Gold Coast | Temur Kuybokarov |
| 2024 | Adelaide | Rishi Sardana |
| 2026 | Sydney | Yi Liu |

== Australian Women's Champions ==
- 1966 Marion McGrath
- 1969 Marion McGrath
- 1972 Narelle Kellner
- 1974 Narelle Kellner
- 1976 Marion McGrath
- 1978 Lynda Pope
- 1980 Marion McGrath
- 1982 Anne Slavotinek
- 1984 Anne Slavotinek
- 1986 Josie Wright
- 1988 Carin Craig
- 1990 Josie Wright
- 1992 Katrin Aladjova
- 1994 Boglarka Remenyi, Narelle Szuveges, Liz Ports and Lee Fraser
- 1995 Daniela Nuțu-Gajić
- 1996 Biljana Dekic & Ngan Phan-Koshnitsky
- 1998 Ngan Phan-Koshnitsky
- 1999 Irina Feldman
- 2002 Narelle Szuveges
- 2003 Slavica Sarai
- 2015 Heather Richards
- 2017 Alexandra Jule
- 2019 Julia Ryjanova
- 2023 Leah Rice
- 2025 Heather Richards

== Australian Junior Champions ==
The Australian Junior Chess Championship is a tournament organised by the Australian Chess Federation and is held every year. It is restricted to junior players under 18 years of age. The Australian Girls Championship is held concurrently.

- 1949 W. Levick
- 1951 John Purdy
- 1952 J. Hortovanyi
- 1953 Malcolm Broun
- 1954 D. Robson
- 1955 J. Hortovanyi
- 1956 A. Irving
- 1957 J. Ferguson
- 1958 D. Rudd
- 1959 Ron Klinger
- 1960 Peter Lay
- 1961 Trevor Hay
- 1962 N. Alexander
- 1963 Maxwell Fuller
- 1964 William Kerr
- 1965 William Kerr
- 1966 Mike Woodhams
- 1967 Arthur Pope
- 1968 Noel Craske
- 1969 John Hendry
- 1970 Alan Sauran
- 1971 Arthur Koelle
- 1972 Greg Melrose
- 1973 Robert Bartnik
- 1974 William Jordan
- 1975 David Dick (finished third behind Murray Chandler and Kai Jensen who were ineligible for title because they were New Zealand residents)
- 1976 Ian Rogers
- 1977 Darryl Johansen / D. Fardell
- 1978 Murray Smith
- 1979 Stephen Kerr
- 1980 Stephen Solomon (tied with Donald MacFarlane who was ineligible for title because he was a South African resident)
- 1981 Rey Casse (tied with Jonathan Sarfati who was ineligible for title because he was a New Zealand resident)
- 1982 Paul Broekhuyse
- 1983 Konrad Hornung
- 1984 Peter Evans
- 1985 Timothy Reilly
- 1986 Shane Hill
- 1987 Colin Davis
- 1988 Lee Jones
- 1989 Peter Cotton
- 1990 Nick Speck
- 1991 Lee Jones
- 1992 Trevor Tao
- 1993 John Paul Wallace
- 1994 Ry Curtis
- 1995 Charles Pizzato
- 1996 David Cordover
- 1997 Max Leskiewicz
- 1998 Geoff Saw
- 1999 David Smerdon
- 2000 Justin Tan
- 2001 Zong-Yuan Zhao
- 2002 Kuan-Kuan Tian
- 2003 Tomek Rej
- 2004 Denis Bourmistrov
- 2005 Moulthun Ly
- 2006 Angela Song
- 2007 Michael Wei
- 2008 Junta Ikeda
- 2009 Cedric Antolis
- 2010 Bobby Cheng
- 2011 Bobby Cheng
- 2012 Alistair Cameron
- 2013 Gene Nakauchi
- 2014 Anton Smirnov
- 2015 Yi Liu
- 2016 Ari Dale
- 2017 Ray Yang
- 2018 David Cannon
- 2019 Sterling Bayaca
- 2020 Cameron McGowan
- 2023 Ruicheng Wang
- 2024 Anh Quan Nguyen
- 2025 Rui Gen Teh
- 2026 Reyaansh Chakrabarty

== Australian Girls Champions ==
- 1960 Irene Tannenthal
- 1964 Rosalind Jones
- 1965 Rosalind Jones
- 1966 Rosalind Jones
- 1967 Marilyn Urlick
- 1968 Nona Monachowec
- 1969 Nona Monachowec
- 1970 Linda Maddern
- 1971 Linda Maddern
- 1972 Lillian Goldsmith
- 1973 Irena Duluk
- 1974 Cathy Innes-Brown
- 1975 Cathy Innes-Brown / Cathy Depasquale / Karen Hancock
- 1976 Kate Marshall
- 1977 Anne Martin
- 1978 Anne Slavotinek
- 1979 Anne Slavotinek
- 1980 Astrid Ketelaar
- 1981 Jill Clementi
- 1982 Josie Wright
- 1983 Trudi Potter
- 1984 Colleen Lau
- 1985 Gina Soto-Olivo
- 1986 Natalie Mills / J. Rees / Blanche Wilkie / Nga Phan
- 1987 Tam Nguyen
- 1988 Nancy Jones
- 1989 Nancy Jones
- 1990 Gabrielle Grbovac / J. King & Barbara Remenyi / Boglarka Remenyi
- 1991 Boglarka Remenyi
- 1992 Jennifer Harrington
- 1993 Veronica Klimenko / I. Liubomirskaia / Narelle Szuveges
- 1994 Sulyn Teh
- 1995 Jasmine Lauer-Smith
- 1996 Laura Moylan
- 1997 Elaine Chong
- 1998 Kylie Coventry
- 1999 Catherine Lip / Jasmine Lauer-Smith / Shiloh Norris
- 2000 Catherine Lip
- 2001 Michelle Lee
- 2002 Shannon Oliver
- 2003 Angela Song
- 2004 Heather Huddleston
- 2005 Rebecca Harris
- 2006 Alexandra Jule
- 2007 Emma Guo
- 2008 Deborah Ng
- 2009 Sally Yu
- 2010 Leteisha Simmonds
- 2011 Savithri Narenthran
- 2012 Miranda Webb-Liddle
- 2013 Nicole Chin
- 2014 Shirley Gu
- 2015 Kristine Quek
- 2016 Zhi Lin Guo
- 2017 Yifan Eva Wang
- 2018 Cassandra Lim
- 2019 Jody Middleton
- 2020 Lillian Lu
- 2023 Chloe Fan
- 2024 Om O'Carroll
- 2025 Athena-Malar Retnaraja
- 2026 Isabella Guan

== Australian Open ==
Where players tied for first place and the winner of the Australian Open Champion title on countback is known, the title winner is indicated followed by the players they tied with in brackets.

- 1971 Lajos Portisch (Hungary)
- 1973 Maxwell Fuller
- 1975 Maxwell Fuller
- 1977 Trevor Hay / Stewart Booth / Michael Woodhams
- 1979 Maxwell Fuller
- 1981 Robert Murray Jamieson
- 1983 Darryl Johansen
- 1985 Guy West
- 1987 Gyula Sax (Hungary)
- 1989 Aleksandar Wohl / Robin Hill
- 1991 Lembit Oll (Estonia) / Edvīns Ķeņģis (Latvia) / Stefan Đurić (Yugoslavia) / Darryl Johansen / Tony Miles (England)
- 1993 Ian Rogers
- 1995 Dinh Duc Trong (Vietnam)
- 1997 Darryl Johansen
- 1999 Vadim Milov (Switzerland)
- 2001 Stefan Đurić
- 2003 John-Paul Wallace
- 2005 Elena Sedina (Italy)
- 2007 Zong-Yuan Zhao
- 2009 Aleksandar Wohl (countback vs George Xie)
- 2011 George Xie (countback vs Zong-Yuan Zhao and Moulthun Ly)
- 2013 Bobby Cheng
- 2015 Ni Hua
- 2017 Max Illingworth (countback vs Temur Kuybokarov (Uzbekistan), Kanan Izzat (Azerbaijan) and Yi Liu)
- 2019 Temur Kuybokarov (countback vs Kanan Izzat (Azerbaijan))
- 2023 Temur Kuybokarov
- 2025 Mihajlo Radovanovic (countback vs Tri Kien Le (Vietnam))

== Australian Grand Prix ==
From 1989 to 2019 a system was in place with points accumulated in different Australian weekend tournaments. The winners were:

- 1989 Ian Rogers
- 1990 Stephen Solomon
- 1991 Darryl Johansen
- 1992 Darryl Johansen
- 1993 Darryl Johansen
- 1994 Ian Rogers
- 1995 Darryl Johansen
- 1996 Darryl Johansen
- 1997 Stephen Solomon
- 1998 Ian Rogers
- 1999 Stephen Solomon
- 2000 Ian Rogers
- 2001 Stephen Solomon
- 2002 Ian Rogers
- 2003 Ian Rogers
- 2004 Ian Rogers
- 2005 Igor Bjelobrk
- 2006 George Xie
- 2007 Dejan Antić
- 2008 Stephen Solomon
- 2009 David Smerdon
- 2010 Zhao Zong-Yuan
- 2011 Stephen Solomon
- 2012 George Xie
- 2013 Brodie McClymont
- 2014 Moulthun Ly
- 2015 Anton Smirnov
- 2016 Brodie McClymont
- 2017 Stephen Solomon
- 2018 Stephen Solomon
- 2019 Stephen Solomon

The Grand Prix has not been held since 2019.

== See also ==
- Chess in Australia
