= Doug Hamilton (chess player) =

Australian chess player (born 1941)

Personal information
- Born: Douglas Gibson Hamilton; 15 August 1941 (age 84) Melbourne, Victoria, Australia

Chess career
- Country: Australia
- Title: FIDE Master (1989); ICCF International Master (2001)
- FIDE rating: 2032 (January 2020)
- Peak rating: 2305 (July 1982)

Douglas Gibson Hamilton (born 15 August 1941) is an Australian chess player who holds the titles of FIDE Master and International Correspondence Chess Master (2001). He is a three-time Australian Chess Championship winner (1965, 1967, 1982).

== Biography ==
In the 1960s, 1970s and 1980s, Hamilton was one of the strongest chess players in Australia. He regularly participated in the Australian Chess Championship and won this tournament three times: in 1965, 1967, and 1982. In 1966, in Auckland, Hamilton played in the World Chess Championship South East Asian Zonal tournament and shared 5th–6th place. He tied for first in the Ballarat Begonia Open in 1969, 1981 and 1994.

Hamilton played for Australia in the Chess Olympiads:

- in 1968, at the first board in the 18th Chess Olympiad in Lugano (+5, =5, -5),
- in 1970, at the third board in the 19th Chess Olympiad in Siegen (+8, =5, -4),
- in 1972, at the first reserve in the 20th Chess Olympiad in Skopje (+8, =3, -4).

In later years, Hamilton actively participated in correspondence chess tournaments. In 2001, he was awarded the ICCF International Correspondence Chess Master (ICCM) title.

Notable Games Hamilton Douglas - Korchnoi Victor Ziegen, 1970 Sicilian, Modern Scheveningen 1.e4 c5 2.Nf3 Nc6 3.d4 cxd4 4.Nxd4 e6 5.Nc3 d6 6.Be3 Nf6 7.Be2 Be7 8.O-O O-O 9.f4 Bd7 10.Qe1 Nxd4 11.Bxd4 Bc6 12.Qg3 g6 13.Qd3 b5 14.Bf3 b4 15.Ne2 Qb8 16.c4 bxc3 17.Qxc3 Bxe4 18.Bxf6 Bxf3 19.Rxf3 Rc8 20.Qd4 Bxf6 21.Qxf6 Rc2 22.Ng3 Qb6+ 23.Kh1 Qxb2 24.Qxb2 Rxb2 25.Kg1 a5 26.Rf2 Rab8 27.Raf1 Kf8 28.Rxb2 Rxb2 29.Rf2 Rb1+ 30.Rf1 Rb4 31.Rf3 d5 32.Ra3 a4 33.Ne2 d4 34.Kf2 f6 35.Kf3 Ke7 36.Ke4 Kd6 37.Kd3 Kd5 38.Ng3 e5 39.fxe5 fxe5 40.Ne4 Kc6 41.g4 h6 ½-½
