= Robert Jamieson (chess player) =

Australian chess player (born 1952)

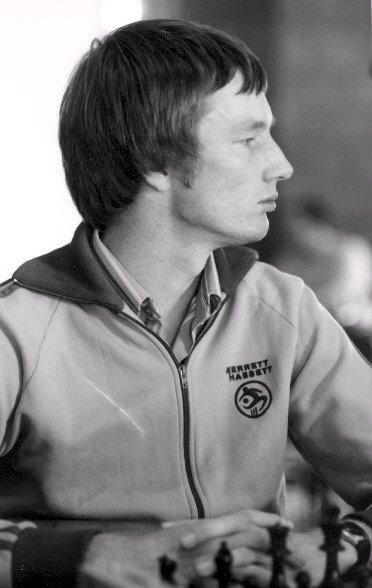
- Robert Jamieson in 1976

Personal information
- Born: Robert Murray Jamieson; 7 July 1952 (age 74) Melbourne, Australia

Chess career
- Country: Australia
- Title: International Master (1976)
- FIDE rating: 2444 (July 2026)
- Peak rating: 2455 (January 1983)

Robert Murray Jamieson (born 7 July 1952 in Melbourne) is an Australian chess International Master.

== Chess career ==
Jamieson won the Australian Chess Championship in Cooma 1974 and Perth 1978 and was therefore recognized as Australia's top player of the late 1970s. In 1981 he won the Australian Open Chess Championship. He won the Doeberl Cup two times in 1976 and 1978.

He was awarded the IM title in 1975 after finishing 3rd in the 1975 Asian Zonal Chess Championship held in Melbourne.

Jamieson represented Australia in five Chess Olympiads in Nice 1974, Haifa 1976, Buenos Aires 1978, Malta 1980 and Lucerne 1982. Jamieson's best performance was at the 25th Chess Olympiad in Lucerne in 1982, where he scored 8.5/11 (77%), winning a bronze medal for equal 3rd best performance on second board, together with Garry Kasparov. This was the first GM norm by an Australian.

In June 1975 Jamieson established the Australian simultaneous chess record at Ormond Chess Club, Melbourne, playing 145 opponents at the same time with opponents including two future Grandmasters. This record has not been broken since.

In the January 1983 FIDE ratings list he achieved his peak rating of 2455, equal 192nd in the world. In the December 2012 FIDE list, he had an Elo rating of 2444. He has played no FIDE-rated games since June 2001.

He served in various roles, including President, of the Australian Chess Federation (ACF) during the 1980s and 1990s, in 1984, he was awarded the Koshnitsky Medal for his services to chess administration and was made a Life Member of the ACF in 1999.

Jamieson now works as a coach at Chess Kids in Australia and occasionally writes for Australian Chess publications as well as delivers chess lectures.

== Notable games ==
- Robert Murray Jamieson vs Wolfgang Unzicker, Haifa 1976, Spanish Game: Exchange, (C69), 1–0
- Juan Manuel Bellon Lopez vs Robert Murray Jamieson, Hoogovens-B 1977, Four Knights Game, Belgrade Gambit (C47), 1/2-1/2
