= Boris Kreiman =

American chess grandmaster (born 1976)

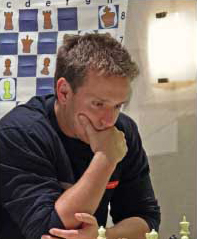

Personal information
- Born: June 7, 1976 (age 50) Moscow, USSR

Chess career
- Country: United States
- Title: Grandmaster (2004)
- FIDE rating: 2481 (July 2026)
- Peak rating: 2515 (January 2000)

Boris Kreiman (born June 7, 1976) is an American chess grandmaster. He is a 3rd-place winner in a U.S. Chess Championship in Seattle and a winner of the Frank P. Samford, Jr. Chess Fellowship.

Kreiman has retired from chess to help communities through chess programs and education.

== Early life and training ==
Kreiman was born in Moscow, Russian SFSR, USSR on June 7, 1976. He later moved to the United States at the age of 13 and settled on Brighton Beach in Brooklyn, New York.

Kreiman began his chess training in Russia, at the age of 5 at the Russian School of Chess in Moscow. It was at Brighton Beach that Kreiman trained with Grandmaster Gata Kamsky, a Soviet-born American chess Grandmaster who was once the third highest rated chess player in the world. Later on, Kreiman also trained with Alex Yermolinsky, another Soviet-born American Chess Grandmaster.

== Chess career ==
Boris Kreiman has won more than 20 international chess tournaments, played in three World Junior Championships, and in three U.S. Championships throughout his chess career. He has been an experienced chess coach for more than a decade.

In both 1993 and 1996 he won the U.S. Junior Championships. In 2002, he won 3rd place in the U.S. Championship in Seattle and has also received the renowned and prestigious "Samford Scholarship". The Samford is given to only the best chess players in the United States and is offered by Chess-in-the-Schools based in New York City.

Kreiman founded the Kreiman Chess Academy in Los Angeles, which is dedicated to incorporating chess into educational systems and to establishing competitive chess programs along the west coast of the U.S.

Instructors at the academy are trained by Kreiman himself. The Kreiman Chess Academy has turned out two National Chess Champions; Joel Banawa and Joaquin "Jake" Banawa in 2005. Both students received $50,000 scholarships to The University of Texas at Dallas.

== See also ==
- List of chess grandmasters
