= Max Illingworth =

Australian chess grandmaster (born 1992)

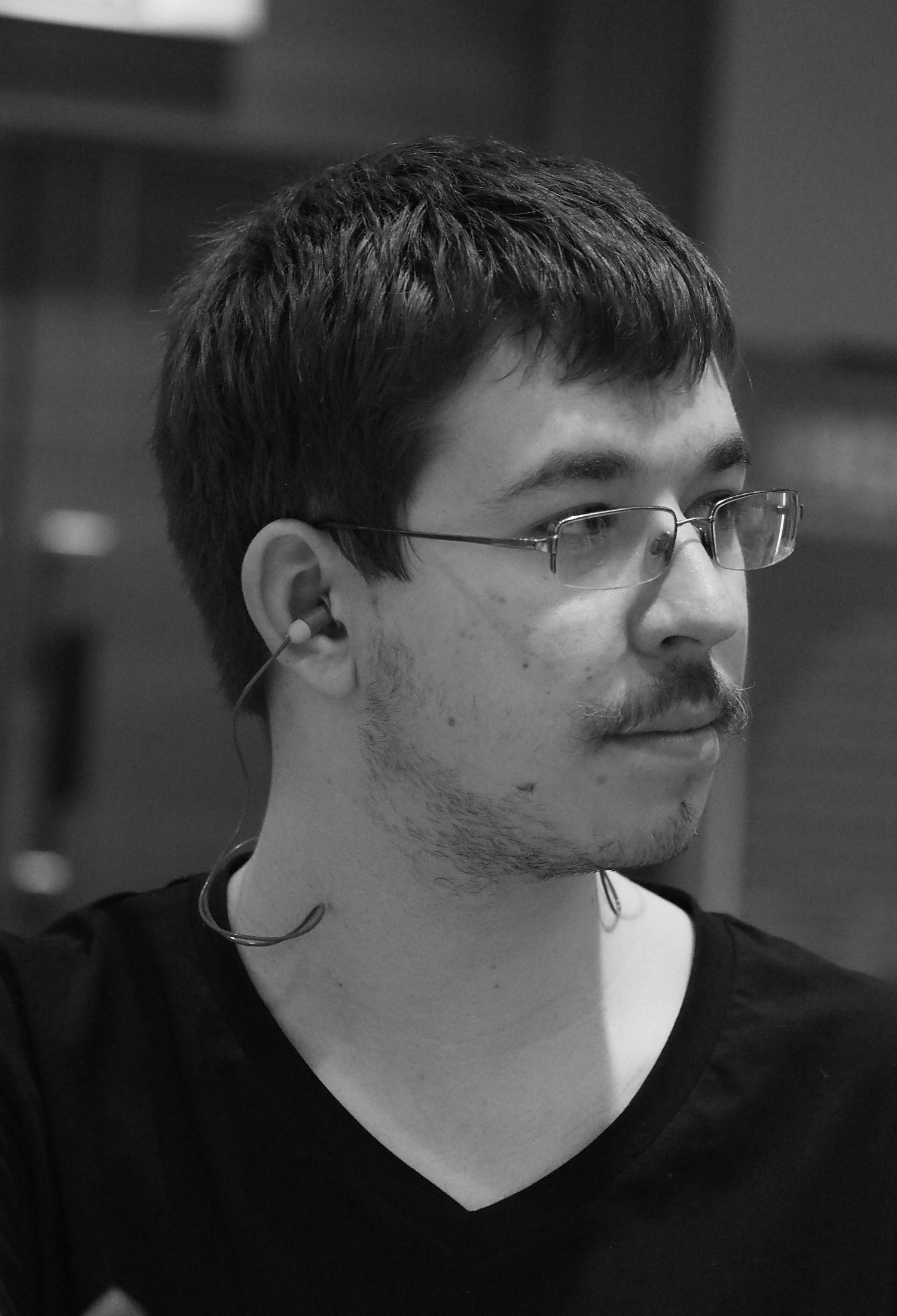
- Illingworth at the 2013 Malaysian Open

Personal information
- Born: 5 November 1992 (age 33) Sydney, Australia

Chess career
- Country: Australia
- Title: Grandmaster (2016)
- FIDE rating: 2493 (October 2026)
- Peak rating: 2525 (July 2018)

Max Illingworth (born 5 November 1992) is an Australian former chess player, and current chess trainer and writer. In 2022 he started playing poker professionally. He was awarded the title Grandmaster by FIDE in 2016, becoming the fifth Australian to achieve this. Illingworth won the Steiner Medal (for the Australian Player of the Year) in 2011, 2012 and 2015. His current FIDE rating is 2493. He retired from competitive chess in March 2019, to concentrate on coaching and writing.

== Chess career ==
Illingworth started playing competitive chess at the age of nine. He played for team Australia in the 2007 World Youth U16 Olympiad. In the same year he competed for the first time in the Oceania zonal championship, which was held in Nadi, Fiji. His result in this tournament gained him a direct award of the title Candidate Master by FIDE.

Illingworth scored 6/9 points to finish in a tie for third at the 2009 Commonwealth Chess Championship in Singapore. The next year, he was awarded the title of FIDE Master.

Illingworth won the First Saturday GM tournament of September 2011 on tiebreak from Levente Vajda scoring 7/9. Thanks to this result he achieved his first norm for the title of Grandmaster. He scored 7/10 for Australia at the 2012 Chess Olympiad in Istanbul. These results earned him the title of International Master, which FIDE awarded him in the congress held during the Olympiad, and established him as one of Australia's strongest chess players.

Illingworth won the MCC Cup Weekender 2012 with a score of 8½/9 points. He has also won the New South Wales State Championship for three consecutive years (2011–13) and tied for first place in the 2011 and 2013 NSW Open. In 2013, Illingworth tied for second place in the Australian Open with a score of 8½/11 points and in the 10th IGB Dato' Arthur Tan Malaysian Open with a score of 7/9.

Illingworth won the 2014 Australian Chess Championship in Springvale, Victoria with a score of 8/11. He scored 6½/9 for Australia at the 2014 Chess Olympiad in Tromsø. The next month, he achieved his second grandmaster norm at the First Saturday GM tournament of September 2014, where he took first place. Strong domestic results include winning the 2014 MCC Hjorth Open with a score of 9/9 and shared second place with Murtas Kazhgaleyev in the 2015 Australian Open. Illingworth won the 2015 Oceania zonal championship after a playoff match against Brodie McClymont. As a result, he qualified to play in the FIDE World Cup. In January 2017 Illingworth won the Australian Open Championship in Brisbane. He won the Oceania zonal again in 2019, held in Guam.

Illingworth is a contributor to the Australian chess magazine 50 Moves and the New In Chess Yearbook. He also writes surveys for the ChessBase Magazine as well as opening articles for ChessPublishing. Illingworth is a professional chess coach and has worked with several of Australia's most promising junior players. He was awarded the title of FIDE Trainer in 2014.

Illingworth retired from competitive chess in March 2019, to concentrate on coaching and writing.
