= William Samuel Viner =

Australian chess player

William Samuel Viner (5 December 1881, in East Maitland, New South Wales – 27 March 1933, in Sydney) was an Australian chess master.

Viver was born on 5 December 1881 at East Maitland, New South Wales, only son of William Samuel Viner, an English tinsmith, and his Australian-born wife Elizabeth, née Blackwell (d. 1884).

Viner was the West Australian champion in 1900, 1901, 1903 and 1905, and won the Perth Chess Club's handicap tournament three times. He also won the Australian Chess Championship four times (1906, 1912, 1913, 1924) and once New Zealand Chess Championship in 1907. His son Phillip Viner was also a chess master.
