= Temur Kuybokarov =

Australian chess grandmaster (born 2000)

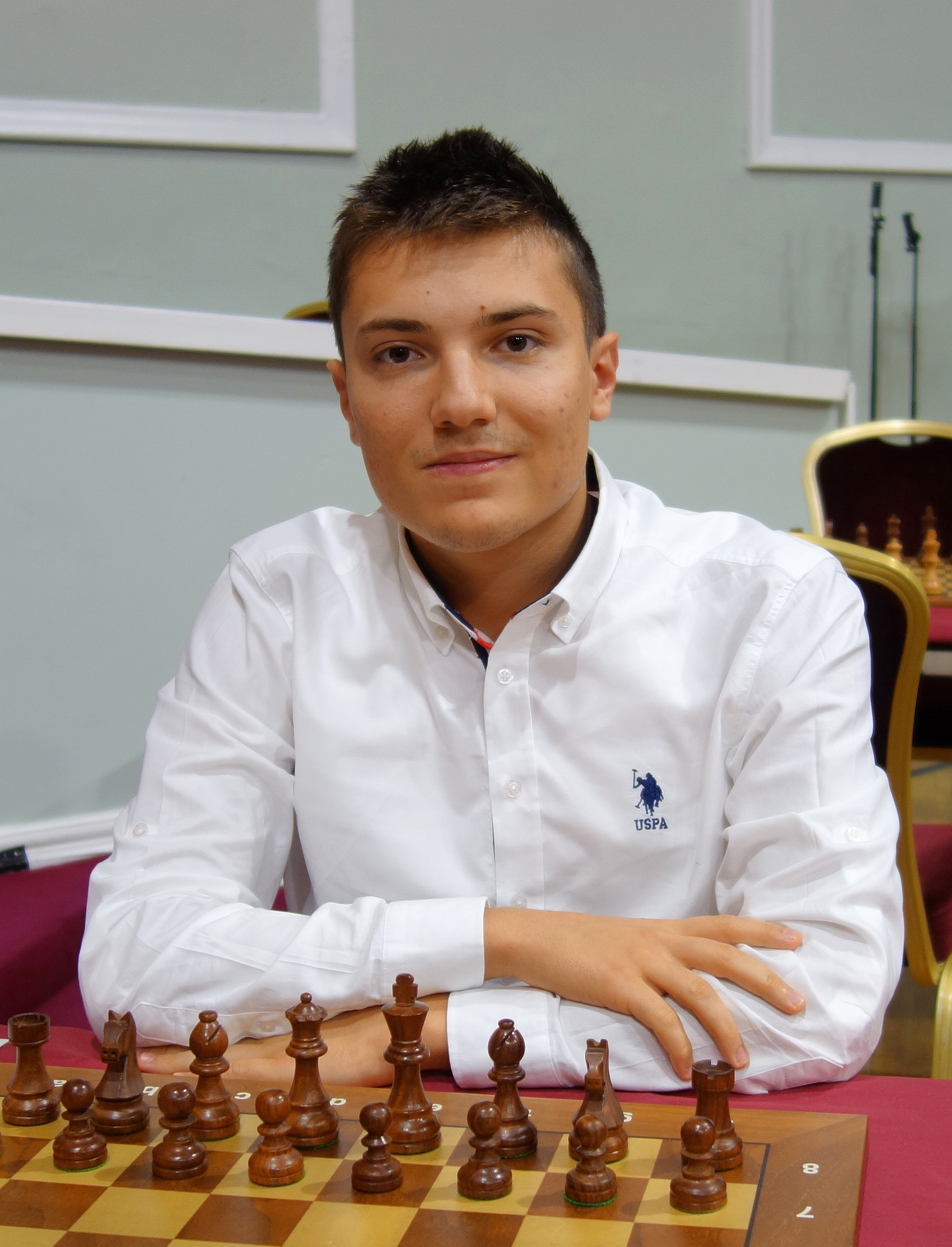
- Kuybokarov in 2023

Personal information
- Born: July 22, 2000 (age 25) Tashkent, Uzbekistan

Chess career
- Country: Uzbekistan (until 2018); Australia (since 2018)
- Title: Grandmaster (2019)
- FIDE rating: 2534 (July 2026)
- Peak rating: 2600 (December 2023)

Temur Kuybokarov (Uzbek: Temur Qo’yboqarov; previously Temur Igonin; born July 22, 2000) is an Uzbekistani-Australian chess player. He was awarded the title of Grandmaster by FIDE in 2019. He qualified as a grandmaster at age 18 - the first from Western Australia - and then in 2020 became Australian chess champion. Born in Tashkent, he represented Uzbekistan until transferring to Australia in 2018.

== Chess career ==
Kuybokarov was taught chess at the age of five by his mother and first coach, Tatyana Igonina.

At the 2010 Asian Youth Championships, held in Beijing, China, he finished in a tie for first place in the U10 section, taking the bronze medal on tiebreak score. At the age of 11, Kyubokarov (then Igonin) defeated World Champion Viswanathan Anand in a simultaneous exhibition, a feat which received worldwide attention.

In 2016, he moved with his family to Australia, where he lives in Perth, Western Australia. In December of the same year, Kuybokarov won the 8th Penang Open. He transferred his national federation from Uzbekistan to Australia in 2018. He won the 2017 and 2019 Australian Open Championship. Kuybokarov achieved the norms required for the title of grandmaster in the following events: Australian Open 2017; Aeroflot Open 2017; and Gold Coast Open 2018. He also scored the fourth norm at the 2018 Abu Dhabi Masters.

In January 2019 Kuybokarov was named one of Western Australia's 50 Rising Stars. In December Kuybokarov won the 2019 Australasian Masters GM norm tournament in Melbourne with a score of 8½/9 points. The next month Kuybokarov won the Australian Championship in Sydney, the first West Australian player in the 135-year history of the event to win the title. In November 2021 Kuybokarov scored 5.5/11 in the FIDE Grand Swiss in Riga, Latvia and won the Mersin Open in Turkey with 7.5/9. In February 2022 Kuybokarov won the Perth Open for the first time.
