= Darryl Johansen =

Australian chess grandmaster (born 1959)

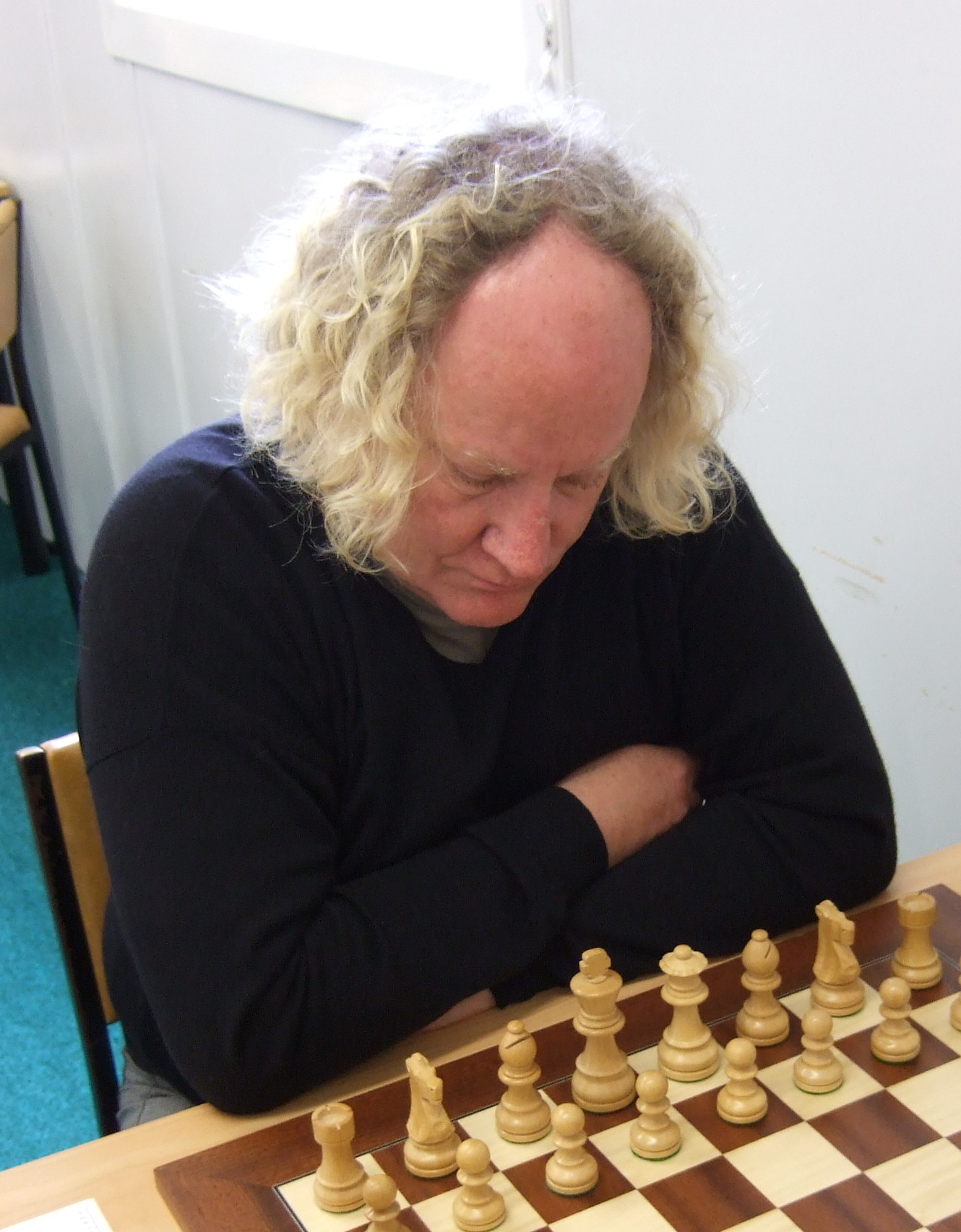

Personal information
- Born: Darryl Keith Johansen; 4 February 1959 (age 67) Melbourne, Australia

Chess career
- Country: Australia
- Title: Grandmaster (1995)
- Peak rating: 2531 (April 2002)

Darryl Keith Johansen (born 4 February 1959 in Melbourne) is an Australian chess grandmaster. He has won the Australian Chess Championship a record six times (in 1984, 1988, 1990, 2000, 2002, and 2012), and represented Australia at fourteen Chess Olympiads (1980–96, 2000–04, 2008–10).

== Career ==
He was awarded by FIDE the titles of International Master in 1982 and Grandmaster in 1995, the second from Australia, after Ian Rogers.

He won the Phillips & Drew Knights Masters tournament in London in 1984. In 1987, he won the inaugural Australian Masters tournament, and has finished first in this event on two other occasions. He won the 2002 Oceania Zonal Championship and represented the Oceania zone at the FIDE World Chess Championship 2004. In 2009, he won the Sydney International Open held in Parramatta, with a score of 7/9, winning the title on tiebreak ahead of George Xie, Abhijit Kunte, and Gawain Jones. This made him the first Australian to win the event. He has also won the Victorian State Chess Championships twelve times, the last occasion being in 2009. In January 2012, Johansen tied for 1st–3rd with Li Chao and Zhao Jun in the third Queenstown Chess Classic, winning the tournament on tiebreak.

Johansen is currently co-director of a chess coaching company, "Chess Ideas", based in Melbourne and still participates in chess tournaments from time to time. Most recently he has finished 3d-equal at the Australian Open Championship held in Perth.
