= Ian Rogers (chess player) =

Australian chess grandmaster (born 1960)

Ian Rogers OAM
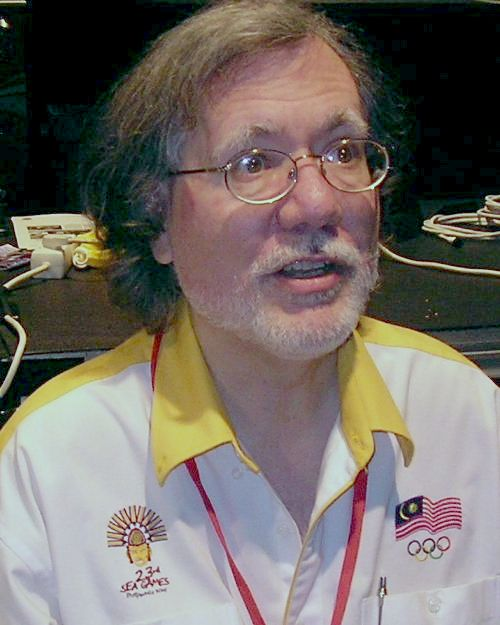
- Rogers at Dortmund 2010

Personal information
- Born: 24 June 1960 (age 66) Hobart, Tasmania, Australia
- Spouse: Cathy Rogers

Chess career
- Country: Australia
- Title: Grandmaster (1985)
- FIDE rating: 2545 (July 2026)
- Peak rating: 2618 (January 1999)
- Peak ranking: No. 50 (May 1999)

Ian Rogers OAM (born 24 June 1960) is an Australian chess player, trainer and writer. He was awarded the title Grandmaster by FIDE in 1985.

== Personal life ==
Before turning professional, Rogers completed a Bachelor of Science in Meteorology from the University of Melbourne.

He is married to Cathy Rogers, herself an International Arbiter, Woman FIDE Master, and a lawyer.

He is a distant cousin of Australian cricketer Chris Rogers.

== Career ==
Rogers is the first Australian-raised chess grandmaster (Walter Browne achieved the title earlier but grew up in the US and represented Australia only from 1969 to 1972). Rogers attained the Grandmaster title in 1985 after becoming an International Master in 1980. He was Australia's highest-rated player for over twenty years, and he represented Australia at fourteen Chess Olympiads (twelve of them on first board).

Rogers has won more than 120 classical chess tournaments, including fifteen round-robin grandmaster tournaments. He won the Australian Chess Championship four times—in 1980, 1986, 1998, and 2006—and holds the record for the most wins (either outright or on tie-break) at the traditional Doeberl Cup, with 12.

Among his career highlights are three consecutive victories from 1988 to 1990 in the grandmaster tournament in Groningen (outright by a clear point in 1988 and 1989, a point ahead of Viswanathan Anand, and jointly in 1990).

In 2005, he was awarded the title of FIDE Senior Trainer.

Rogers retired from competitive chess on medical advice in July 2007. However, while no longer participating in tournaments, Rogers remains active within the Australian chess scene.

Throughout his competitive career and more so since his retirement from competitive chess in July 2007, Rogers has reported on many tournaments for various media outlets, with photographic assistance from Cathy Rogers. He was a panellist for BBC television during their 1993 World Championship coverage and covered numerous major championships for news agency Reuters. Rogers has also worked as a public commentator at high-level matches and tournaments around the world, including at World Championship and Candidates matches in London, and commentating on tournaments in Wijk aan Zee, Moscow and Saint Louis.

Rogers was awarded the Medal of the Order of Australia (OAM) in the 1996 Australia Day Honours for his service to chess.

Rogers also streams on Twitch under the account gmianr.

== Chess strength ==
Rogers' peak international ranking was 50th in the world in May–June 1999, and he was the highest-ranked Australian player from 1984 until his retirement in 2007. His best single performance was at the Belgrade Open in 1984.

== Books ==
- Ian Rogers (1981). Australian Chess Into the Eighties. Sun Books. ISBN 0-72510-384-1.
- Ian Rogers; Cathy Rogers (Photographer) (1996). Australia at the Yerevan Chess Olympiad. Australian Chess Enterprises. ISBN 1-87571-607-6.
- Ian Rogers, Ralph Shaw (2021). Terrey Shaw - Australian Chess Ironman. Australian Chess Enterprises. ISBN 9781875716005.
- Ian Rogers (2021). Oops! I Resigned Again!. Russell Enterprises. ISBN 978-194 985 9423.
- Ian Rogers (2023). Oops! I Resigned One More Time. Russell Enterprises. ISBN 978-194 985 9652.
- Ian Rogers, Laszlo Hazai (2025). The World's Most Boring Chess Book. Russell Enterprises. ISBN 978-196 388 5019.
- Ian Rogers (2025). The Chess Career of Markus Wettstein. Australian Chess Enterprises. ISBN 978-187 571 6036.
- Ian Rogers (2025). Rogers' Practical Endgame Guide. Australian Chess Enterprises. ISBN 978-187 571 6029.

== Notable games ==
- Ian Rogers vs. Viktor Korchnoi, Biel-A, CBM 01 1986, French Defense: Winawer, Retreat Variation General (C18), 1–0
- Ian Rogers vs. Robert Huebner, Wellington, CBM 07 1988, Sicilian Defense: Najdorf Variation, English Attack (B90), 1–0
- Ian Rogers vs. Alexey Shirov, Groningen 1990, Sicilian Defense: Boleslavsky Variation (B59), 1–0
- Kiril D Georgiev vs. Ian Rogers, Switzerland 1993, Benko Gambit: Accepted, Modern Variation (A57), 0–1
- Ian Rogers vs. Peter Acs, Wijk aan Zee 2003, English Opening: King's English, Two Knights' Variation Smyslov System (A22), 1–0
- Ian Rogers vs. Roland Berzinsh, 4NCL 2006-07 2007, Nimzo-Indian Defense: Classical, Berlin Variation (E38), 1–0
- Ian Rogers vs. Michael Rohde, Philadelphia 1982, Gruenfield Defense: General (D80), 1–0
