= Norm (chess) =

High level of performance in a chess tournament

A norm in chess is a high level of performance in a chess tournament. The level of performance is typically measured in tournament performance rating above a certain threshold (for instance, 2600 for Grandmaster (GM) norm), and there is a requirement on the level of tournament, for instance by a prescribed minimal number of participants of given title/level one meets. Several norms are among the requirements to receive a title such as GM from FIDE.

== Grandmaster norm ==
To qualify for the title of Grandmaster (GM) of chess, a title awarded by FIDE, the World Chess Federation, a player must achieve three or more grandmaster norms in events covering a minimum of 27 games. Norms can only be gained in tournaments that fulfill FIDE's strict criteria: for instance, the entry must include at least three GM titled players from different countries playing over a minimum of nine rounds with not less than 120 minutes thinking time per round, assuming the game lasts 60 moves (so for instance 90 minutes + 30 seconds per move qualifies). There are a number of other more minor stipulations, such as that an International Arbiter must be officiating the event. Generally, players must achieve a tournament performance rating (TPR) of at least 2600 to earn a Grandmaster norm.

Norms can also be earned by placing highly enough in particular FIDE events. For example, Shawn Rodrigue-Lemieux earned his first Grandmaster norm by virtue of winning the Under-18 section at the 2022 World Youth Chess Championship.

FIDE publishes the current title regulations on its website.

== Other FIDE norms ==
There are also less strict norm requirements for the titles of International Master (IM), Woman International Master (WIM), and Woman Grandmaster (WGM).

== In national organizations ==
In March 2009, the United States Chess Federation introduced its own title system. This system requires five norms in order to achieve titles at seven different levels, ranking from "Life Senior Master" down to "4th category". The requirements for these norms are less strict than those for FIDE norms.
