= Leonard Barden =

English chess player and writer (born 1929)

- Born: Leonard William Barden; 20 August 1929 (age 97); South Croydon, London, England
- Occupations: chess player, writer, broadcaster, journalist

Leonard William Barden (born 20 August 1929, in South Croydon, London) is an English chess master, writer, broadcaster, journalist, organiser and promoter. The son of a dustman, he was educated at Whitgift School, South Croydon, and Balliol College, Oxford, where he read Modern History. Barden learned to play chess at age 11 while in a school shelter during a World War II German air raid. Within a few years he became one of the country's leading juniors. Barden represented England in four Chess Olympiads. He played a major role in the rise of English chess from the 1970s. Barden is a chess columnist for various newspapers. His column in London's Evening Standard was the world's longest-running daily chess column by the same author.

== Early life ==
Barden was born in South Croydon on 20 August 1929. His father ran a business which collapsed during the Great Depression, and eventually found employment as a dustman. Leonard attended Whitgift School when it was a grammar school, before it reverted to independent status in 1946.

== Playing career ==
=== Junior results ===
In 1946, Barden won the British Junior Correspondence Chess Championship, and tied for first place in the London Boys' Championship. The following year he tied for first with Jonathan Penrose in the British Boys' Championship, but lost the playoff.

=== British results ===
Barden finished fourth at Hastings in 1951–52. In 1952, he won the Paignton tournament ahead of the Canadian future grandmaster Daniel Yanofsky. Barden captained the Oxfordshire team which won the English Counties championship in 1951 and 1952. In the latter year, he captained the University of Oxford team which won the National Club Championship, and he represented the university in the annual team match against the University of Cambridge during his years there. In 1953, Barden won the individual British Lightning Championship (ten seconds a move). The following year, he tied for first with the Belgian grandmaster Albéric O'Kelly de Galway at Bognor Regis; was joint British champion, with Alan Phillips; and won the Southern Counties Championship. Barden finished fourth at Hastings 1957–58, which Chessmetrics ranks as his best statistical performance. In the 1958 British Chess Championship, Barden again tied for first, but lost the playoff match to Penrose 1½–3½.

=== Chess Olympiads ===
Barden represented England in the Chess Olympiads at Helsinki 1952 (playing fourth board, scoring 2 wins, 5 draws, and 4 losses), Amsterdam 1954 (playing first reserve, scoring 1 win, 2 draws, and 4 losses), Leipzig 1960 (first reserve; 4 wins, 4 draws, 2 losses), and Varna 1962 (first reserve; 7 wins, 2 draws, 3 losses). The latter was his best performance by far.

=== Morphy number ===
Barden has a Morphy number of 3 by six different routes. He drew with Jacques Mieses in the Premier Reserves at Hastings 1948–49. Mieses drew with Henry Bird in the last round of Hastings 1895, and Bird played a number of games with Paul Morphy in 1858 and 1859. Mieses also beat Louis Paulsen at Breslau 1889. Morphy and Paulsen played at least 11 games against each other in 1857. Barden also played four opponents of James Mortimer: Edward Sergeant, Savielly Tartakower, Sir George Thomas, and Eugene Znosko-Borovsky. Mortimer reportedly played Morphy many games in Paris during the 1850s and 1860s.

== Chess organisation, broadcasting, writing ==
In 1964, Barden gave up most competitive chess to devote his time to chess organisation, broadcasting, and writing about the game. He has made invaluable contributions to English chess as a populariser, writer, organiser, fundraiser, and broadcaster.

He was controller of the British Chess Federation Grand Prix for many years, having found its first sponsor, Cutty Sark whisky. He was a regular contributor to the BBC's Network Three weekly radio chess programme from 1958 to 1963. His best-known contribution was a consultation game, recorded in 1960 and broadcast in 1961, where he partnered Bobby Fischer against the English masters Jonathan Penrose and Peter Clarke. This was the only recorded consultation game of Fischer's career. The game, unfinished after eight hours of play, was adjudicated a draw by former world champion Max Euwe. Barden gave BBC television commentaries on all the games in the 1972 world championship. From 1973 to 1978 he was co-presenter of BBC2's annual Master Game televised programme.

=== Chess columns ===
Barden is a record-holding chess columnist, both for a weekly column and a daily column.

He was hired by The Manchester Guardian in 1955 to replace Julius du Mont. His weekly column has been published in The Guardian since September 1955 (for 69 years and 3 months as of December 2024) and in the Financial Times since March 1974 (for 50 years and 7 months as of December 2024). A typical Barden column not only contains a readable tournament report, but is geared toward promoting the game.

His daily column was published, firstly in print and subsequently online, in the London Evening Standard column from June 1956 until 31 January 2020. It is by far the world's longest running daily chess column by the same author, the previous record having been set by George Koltanowski in the San Francisco Chronicle: 51 years, 9 months, and 18 days, including posthumous articles. Barden's column ran for 63 years, 7 months and 27 days, which exceeds the world record of 45 years and 240 days (as of 28 February 2019) that Guinness World Records recognizes for Lam Shan Muk of Hong Kong, a daily commentator for the Hong Kong Economic Journal.

In 2024, FIDE, the world chess federation, gave Barden a "FIDE 100 Award" for "Best Journalist".

=== Books ===
Barden has written the following books:

- A Guide to Chess Openings (1957)
- How Good Is Your Chess? (1957)
- The Elements of Chess (with J. du Mont, 1958)
- Chess (1959)
- An Introduction to Chess Moves and Tactics Simply Explained (1959)
- Modern Chess Miniatures (with Wolfgang Heidenfeld, 1960)
- 30th U.S.S.R. Chess Championship: Erevan, Armenia, November–December, 1962 (1963),
- The Ruy Lopez (1963)
- The Guardian Chess Book (1967)
- An Introduction to Chess (1967)
- The King's Indian Defence (1968)
- The Grunfeld Defence (1968)
- An Introduction to Chess (1970)
- How to Play the Endgame in Chess (1975)
- The Batsford Guide to Chess Openings (with Tim Harding, 1976)
- Chess: Master the Moves (1977)
- Guide to the Chess Openings (with Tim Harding, 1977),
- Leonard Barden's Chess Puzzle Book (1977) (a collection of his Evening Standard columns)
- The Master Game (with Jeremy James, 1979)
- Play Better Chess with Leonard Barden (1980)
- Nigel Short, Chess Prodigy: His Career and Best Games (with David Short and G.S. Botterill, 1981)
- Openings for the Club Player (with Tim Harding, 1987)
- Chess Openings for the Average Player (with Tim Harding, 1998)
- Batsford Chess Puzzles (2002)
- Chess 80 Classic Problems: One Move and You're Dead (with Erwin Brecher, 2009).

Barden's earliest literary credit is for proofreading "R.P. Michell: A Master of British Chess" by J. du Mont, published by Pitman in 1947.

== Role in "English Chess Explosion" ==
Barden played a key role in the rapid advance of English chess in the 1970s and 1980s from also-rans to Olympiad silver medal winners. His involvement began in 1971 when he noticed that Tony Miles and Michael Stean were both likely contenders for the 1973 world junior (under-20) championship, but that the only way for a country to have two representatives was to host the event. Barden knew the financier Jim Slater, who offered to co-sponsor the event, which was staged at Teesside. Miles and Stean won the silver and bronze medals there. Miles won the championship the following year. Slater also agreed to Barden's proposal that he should finance special coaching by Bob Wade for the five best teenage prospects. They all became grandmasters.

In 1972, after Slater had saved the world championship match between Bobby Fischer and Boris Spassky from collapse by doubling the prize fund, he offered £5,000 to the first English grandmaster (who wound up being Miles), and £2,500 to each of the next four players to qualify. Barden worked out the detailed terms, and wrote the speech at Hastings where Slater announced the awards. Encouraged by success, Barden and Slater then agreed on a wider programme to stimulate talent at much younger ages, aiming to produce a generation which could compete with the Soviet Union, the world's leading chess nation.

Barden organised weekend junior invitation events at which the best prospects played a tournament and had coaching from masters between games. They were also introduced to top master chess at the annual Evening Standard weekend open and via grandmaster simultaneous exhibitions. The model was the USSR's own programme in the 1930s, when future masters scored impressively in exhibitions against world-class masters José Raúl Capablanca and Salo Flohr during the 1935 and 1936 Moscow tournaments. Very few juniors in the 1970s had international ratings, so Barden compiled his own world ranking lists for every age group from under-18 to under-10, updating the figures at monthly or weekly intervals and posting the results at the invitation events.

Barden read much Soviet chess literature, and in 1974 decided that an 11-year-old then named Gary Wainstein was a likely future world champion. His Guardian column of 24 February 1975, headlined "World Champ 1990", made this a specific forecast. It was, by more than a year, the first such prediction by anyone for the future Garry Kasparov, who beat Barden's forecast by five years when he won the title in 1985.

By summer 1975 Barden believed that Nigel Short, then aged 9, also had world title potential. The simultaneous programme was intensified for Short, who in the next few years played three world champions and several other top grandmasters. Barden also used his columns to promote his juniors, whom some called "the Barden babes". When Short defeated Viktor Korchnoi, the world's second strongest active player, in a 1976 Evening Standard simultaneous the result was announced on that evening's ITN news bulletin.

One purpose of the publicity was to attract more sponsorship, and in summer 1976 Barden secured backing from Lloyds Bank. The bank's chairman, Sir Jeremy Morse, was an eminent chess problemist, and its sponsorship manager, Pat Bowman, liked the concept of the bank financing a serious challenge to Soviet chess supremacy.

The first Lloyds Bank event was a pilot, a London vs. New York City telex match, to celebrate the United States Bicentennial, in which the American captain agreed to Barden's proposal to include extra under-11 boards, on one of which Short (who lived near Manchester) beat the future US champion Joel Benjamin. By then many juniors were advancing towards master strength, but lacked official FIDE international ratings and titles. So in 1977 the annual Lloyds Bank Masters in London was launched, modelled on a successful US event at Lone Pine where the best US juniors competed against grandmasters. This legendary Open lasted until 1994 (18th edition, won by Alexander Morozevich). Barden also organised an all-play-all tournament, the Lord John Cup in London, where three young and promising English masters – John Nunn, Michael Stean and Jonathan Mestel – met such grandmasters as tournament-winner Vlastimil Hort, Miguel Quinteros, Eugenio Torre, and the legendary Alexander Kotov.

By 1978, when England won the World Student Team Chess Championship at Mexico City ahead of the USSR, and a group financed by Lloyds Bank performed strongly at Lone Pine, the golden generation was on the way to the Olympiad silver medals achieved in 1984, 1986 and 1988. Barden continued to seek new primary school talent, and in 1980 recognised the exceptional promise of the then 8-year-old Michael Adams. Adams lived in Cornwall, far from the major chess centres, so Barden arranged for a Devon organiser, Ken Butt, to stage an annual Lloyds Bank under-18 international tournament in Plymouth. Adams first played there at age 10, and by 12 missed an international master result by only half a point in his Lloyds Bank Masters debut where, in line with Barden's policy of matching the best talents against top grandmasters, he also performed well in a blitz game against Spassky.

By the 1980s the "English Chess Explosion" was in full swing, but Barden took a lesser role due to having to care for his mother, who suffered from Alzheimer's disease. He still spotted talents early, notably Matthew Sadler, who debuted in the Lloyds Bank tournament at 11 and became a leading grandmaster in the 1990s. In 1992 when the British Chess Federation was reluctant to send Luke McShane, then 8, to the 1992 world under-10 championship in Duisburg, Barden campaigned for a positive outcome which was rewarded when McShane won the gold medal. In 1988–90, he managed the early programme for David Howell, then 8, who at 16 became the United Kingdom's youngest grandmaster.

In recognition of his efforts, Barden was offered an OBE, but declined it.

== Chess strength ==
According to Chessmetrics, Barden's best single performance was at Hastings 1957–58, where he finished fourth behind Paul Keres, Svetozar Gligorić and Miroslav Filip, scoring 5/9 (56%). At his peak, he was likely at or close to International Master strength, but never formally received this title from FIDE. Chessmetrics assigned Barden a peak retrospective rating of 2497 for January 1958, number 187 in the world. FIDE did not introduce international ratings until 1970, after Barden had virtually stopped competing.

== Notable games ==
- Barden considers his best game to be his win against Čeněk Kottnauer (Black) at Ilford Premier 1960:
1.e4 c5 2.Nf3 d6 3.d4 cxd4 4.Nxd4 Nf6 5.Nc3 a6 6.Bg5 Nbd7 7.Bc4 e6 8.0-0 h6 9.Bh4 Ne5 10.Bb3 Qc7 11.Qe2 Be7 12.f4 Ng6 13.Bg3 Qc5 14.Rad1 e5 15.fxe5 dxe5 16.Bf2 exd4 17.Bxd4 Bg4 18.Bxf7+ Kf8 19.Qxg4 Nxg4 20.Bxg6+ Kg8 21.Bxc5 Bxc5+ 22.Kh1 Ne3 23.g4 Nxf1 24.Rxf1 Rf8 25.Rxf8+ Kxf8 26.Nd5 Bd6 27.Kg2 Be5 28.b3 Bd6 29.h4 h5 30.gxh5 Rh6 31.Kf3 Rh8 32.Kg4 Rh6 33.Kf5 Bg3 34.Ke6 Bxh4 35.c4 Bg3 36.Kd7 Be5 37.Kc8 1–0
- Barden called his win against Weaver Adams (Black) at Hastings 1950–51 "my favourite game":
1.e4 e5 2.Nf3 Nc6 3.Bc4 Nf6 4.Ng5 d5 5.exd5 Nxd5 6.d4 Bb4+ 7.c3 Be7 8.Nxf7 Kxf7 9.Qf3+ Ke6 10.Qe4 Bf8 11.0-0 Ne7 12.f4 c6 13.fxe5 Kd7 14.Be2 Ke8 15.c4 Nc7 16.Nc3 Be6 17.Bg5 Qd7 18.Rad1 Rc8 19.Bxe7 Qxe7 20.d5 Qc5+ 21.Kh1 cxd5 22.cxd5 Bd7 23.e6 Bb5 24.Qf4 Kd8 25.Bxb5 Nxb5 26.Nxb5 Qxb5 27.d6 1–0
- Here Barden annihilates Jonathan Penrose, who won a famous game against reigning World Champion Mikhail Tal the following year, and ultimately won the British Chess Championship a record ten times:
Barden vs. Penrose, British Championship 1959:
1.e4 e5 2.Nf3 Nc6 3.Bb5 a6 4.Ba4 Nf6 5.0-0 Be7 6.Re1 b5 7.Bb3 0-0 8.c3 d6 9.h3 Na5 10.Bc2 c5 11.d4 Qc7 12.Nbd2 Be6 13.dxe5 dxe5 14.Ng5 Bd7 15.Nf1 Rad8 16.Qe2 g6 17.Ne3 Bc8 18.a4 c4 19.axb5 axb5 20.Rd1 Rxd1+ 21.Qxd1 Rd8 22.Qe2 b4 23.Rxa5! Qxa5 24.Qxc4 Rf8 25.Nxf7! Kg7 26.Nf5+! gxf5 27.Bh6+ Kg6 28.Bxf8 Bxf8 29.Nh8+ Kh6 30.Qxc8 Kg7 31.Qe6 Qa1+ 32.Kh2 Qxb2 33.Bb3 h5 34.Qf7+ Kxh8 35.Qxf8+ 1–0
- Young vs. Barden, correspondence 1945:
1.e4 e5 2.Nf3 Nc6 3.Bc4 Nf6 4.Ng5 d5 5.exd5 Na5 6.Bb5+ c6 7.dxc6 bxc6 8.Qf3 cxb5!? 9.Qxa8 Bc5 10.Ne4 Nxe4 11.Qxe4 0-0 12.0-0 Re8 13.Qe2 Bb7 14.Qxb5 Bb6 15.d3 Re6 16.Kh1 Bxg2+ 17.Kxg2 Qa8+ 18.f3 Rg6+ 19.Kh1 Qxf3+ 20.Rxf3 Rg1# 0–1
