= The Master Game =

BBC chess programme

- Presented by: Jeremy James; Leonard Barden; Bill Hartston
- Opening theme: "Come Maddalena" by Ennio Morricone
- Country of origin: United Kingdom
- Original language: English
- No. of series: 7
- No. of episodes: 75

Production
- Producer: Robert Toner
- Production locations: London, England; Bath, England
- Running time: 25 minutes

Original release
- Network: BBC Two
- Release: 25 June 1975 – 28 April 1982

Related
- Chess Masters: The Endgame

The Master Game was a BBC production of televised chess tournaments that ran for seven series on BBC2 from 1975 to 1982.

Jeremy James and Bill Hartston presenting an episode of The Master Game, 1981

Presented by Jeremy James with expert analysis from Leonard Barden and, later, Bill Hartston, The Master Game was noted for its innovative style, in which a display board with animated figurines and move notation, shown centre-left of screen, was accompanied by footage of the players cogitating, their thoughts during the game heard in voice-over.

As a theme tune, the later series of this programme used the Disco '78 version of Ennio Morricone's "Come Maddalena".

== History and technique ==
The Master Game's producer, Robert Toner, recalled previous work for the coverage of the Fischer-Spassky 1972 World Championship match: "Marsland Gander, then TV critic of the Daily Telegraph, wrote, 'The manner in which the games are presented, with experts standing in front of magnetic boards, moving pieces by hand, shows that television has made no technical progress with chess for the past twenty years'. He was right – from that time I began to wrestle with the problem."

The result was the creation of a special invitational knock-out tournament. The games were played away from the television studio, the audio recordings of the players' thoughts being made immediately afterwards. The players would later be filmed in a studio reconstruction of the game, made to match the audio recordings.

Danish grandmaster Bent Larsen considers his move during Tony Miles vs. Bent Larsen, The Master Game, 1981

Added to this intensive, unorthodox production method were the ground-breaking animated board and pieces created by designer John Bone and the technicians at BBC Bristol. This effect was achieved using a glass chess table on which the moves were made by a cloaked and gloved player. The piece symbols seen on-screen were actually on the underside of the pieces themselves, which were filmed from beneath in reflection, to correct for the left/right reversal that resulted. In addition to this, the expert commentator could use an electronic pointer, illuminating the squares to graphically indicate the ideas being discussed. The effect that combining all of these elements produced had never been previously achieved and is remarkably similar to a high quality, digitally produced, modern multimedia chess presentation, yet was created using only puppetry techniques, fairy lights, mirrors and much editing.

== Series details ==
The series were variously directed by Geoff Walmsley, Sandra Wainwright and Jill Dawson.

Knock-out format, domestic field:

- Series One (1975–76). (First Prize: £250). Participants: George Botterill, Bill Hartston (winner), Jonathan Mestel, Tony Miles, John Nunn, Jonathan Speelman (runner-up), Michael Stean, Howard Williams.
- Series Two (1976–77). Participants: George Botterill, Peter Clarke, Jana Hartston, Bill Hartston (winner), Julian Hodgson, Tony Miles, John Nunn (runner-up), Nigel Short.

International field adopted:

- Series Three (1977–78). (First Prize: £1250). Participants: Jan Hein Donner, Bill Hartston, Werner Hug, Anatoly Karpov (winner), Bent Larsen, Tony Miles (runner-up) Helmut Pfleger, Lothar Schmid.
- Series Four (1978–79). Participants: Walter Browne, Jan Hein Donner, Gyozo Forintos, Vlastimil Hort (runner-up), Bent Larsen (winner), Tony Miles, John Nunn, Alberic O'Kelly.

Twin group format adopted:

- Series Five (1979–80). (First Prize: £2500). Participants: A) Walter Browne (runner-up), Vlastimil Hort, John Nunn, Helmut Pfleger; B) Robert Byrne, Lothar Schmid (winner), Michael Stean, Viktor Korchnoi.
- Series Six (1980–81). (First Prize: £2500). Participants: A) Robert Byrne, Svetozar Gligorić, Vlastimil Hort, Nigel Short (winner); B) Jan Hein Donner, Bent Larsen, Tony Miles (runner-up), Lothar Schmid.
- Series Seven (1981–82). (First Prize: £2500; Second Prize: £2000). Participants: A) Andras Adorjan (runner-up), Larry Christiansen, Hans-Joachim Hecht, Nigel Short; B) Walter Browne, Raymond Keene, Eric Lobron (winner), Miguel Quinteros.
- Series Eight (1983) - Never broadcast due to industrial action. The programmes, taped in English in Bath, was later dubbed into German and shown by NDR. Participants: A) Anatoly Karpov (runner-up), Walter Browne, Murray Chandler, Ian Rogers; B) Tony Miles (winner), Vlastimil Hort, Guillermo Garcia Gonzales, Stefan Kindermann.
