= Tony Miles =

English chess grandmaster (1955–2001)

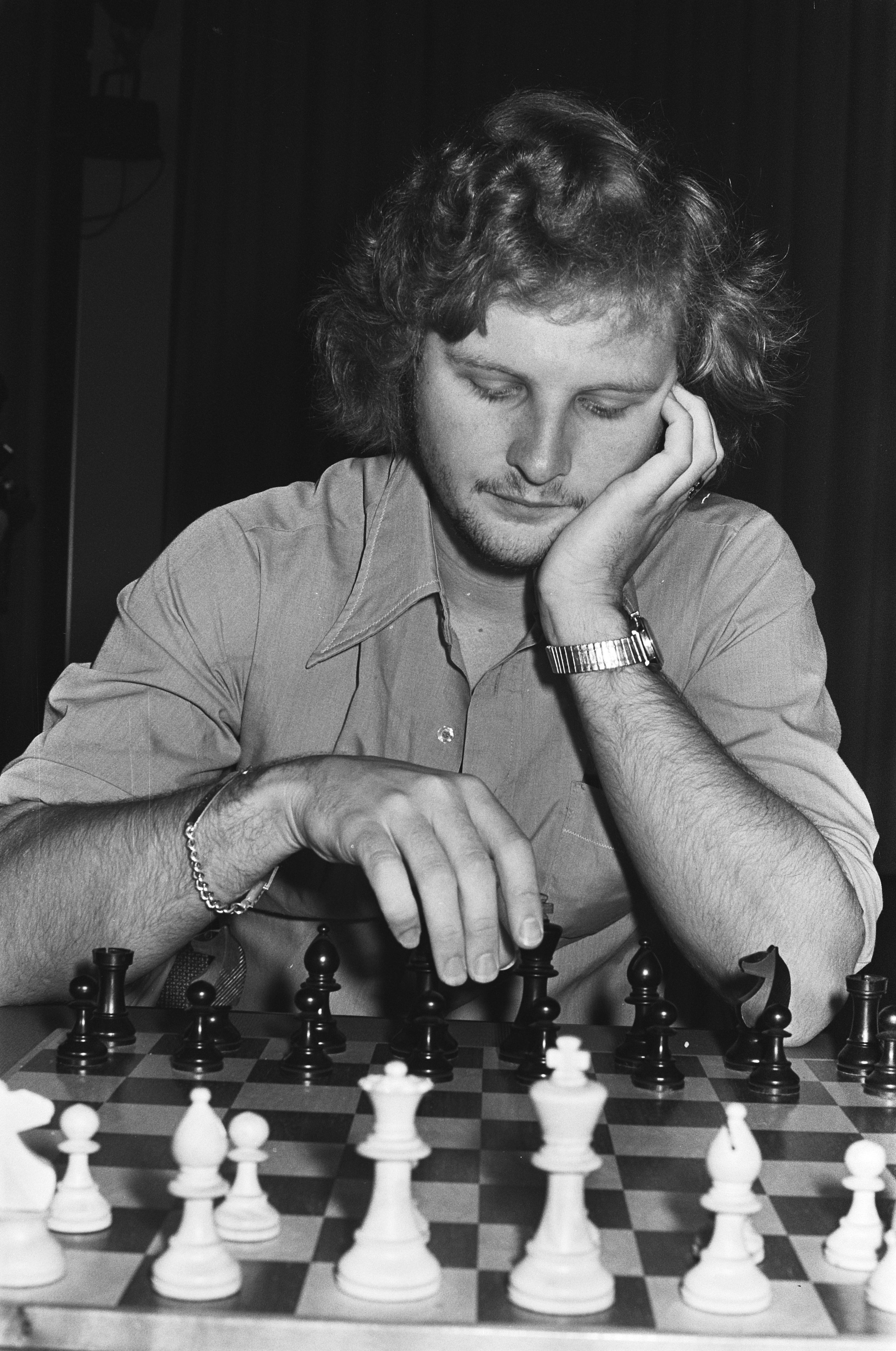
- Miles in 1977

Personal information
- Born: Anthony John Miles; 23 April 1955 Birmingham, England
- Died: 12 November 2001 (aged 46) Birmingham, England

Chess career
- Country: England
- Title: Grandmaster (1976)
- Peak rating: 2635 (January 1996)
- Peak ranking: No. 9 (January 1986)

Anthony John Miles (23 April 1955 – 12 November 2001) was an English chess player and the first Englishman to earn the Grandmaster title.

== Early and personal life ==
Miles was born on 23 April 1955 in Edgbaston, a suburb of Birmingham, and attended King Edward's School, Birmingham. He was married and divorced twice and had no children. Miles's first wife was Jana Bellin, who had previously been married to William Hartston.

== Early chess career ==
He learned the game of chess early in life and made good progress nationally, taking the titles of British under-14 Champion and under-21 Champion in 1968 and 1971, respectively.

In 1973, Miles won the silver medal at the World Junior Chess Championship at Teesside, his first important event against international competition. Both he and compatriot Michael Stean defeated the tournament winner Alexander Beliavsky, but were unable to match the Soviet player's ruthlessness in dispatching lesser opponents. Miles went on to win this prestigious title the following year in Manila, while a mathematics undergraduate of the University of Sheffield.

Taking the decision to pursue the game professionally, Miles did not complete his studies; however, in 1975, he was awarded an MA by the university in respect of his chess achievements.

== Later career ==
In 1976, Miles became the first UK-born, over-the-board chess grandmaster, narrowly beating Raymond Keene to the accolade. The naturalised, German-born Jacques Mieses was awarded the GM title in 1950, while Keith Richardson had been awarded the GM title for correspondence chess earlier in the 1970s. For his achievement, Miles won a £5,000 prize, put up by wealthy businessman and chess backer Jim Slater.

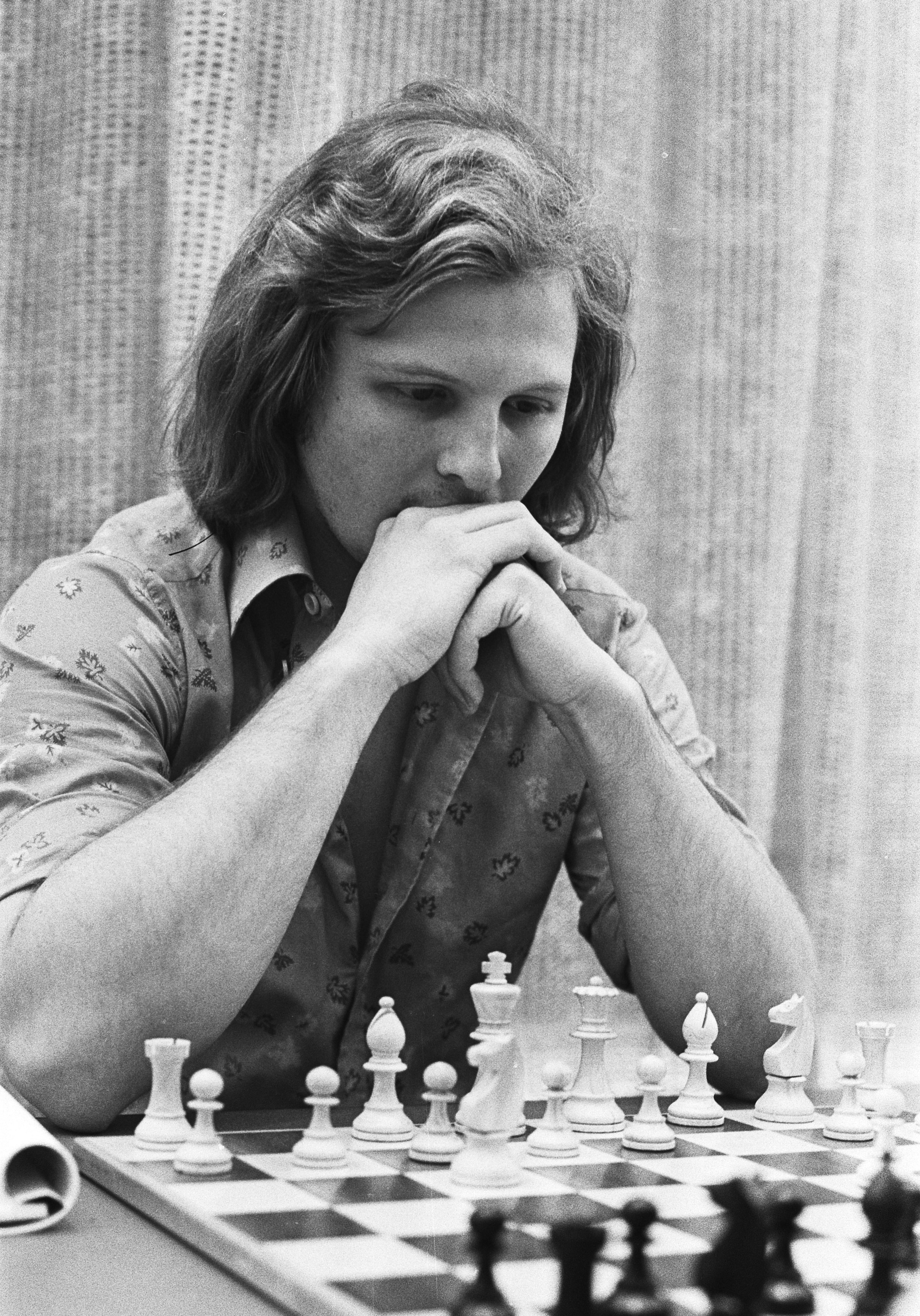
Miles (Amsterdam, 1976)

Miles had a string of good results in the late 1970s and 1980s. He matured into a world-class player and won games against high-calibre opponents such as former World Chess Champions Vasily Smyslov, Mikhail Tal and Boris Spassky.

In 1980, at the European Team Championship in Skara, he beat reigning World Champion Anatoly Karpov with Black, using the extremely unorthodox opening 1. e4 a6!?, the St. George Defence. It is often said that Miles learned the line from offbeat-openings enthusiast Michael Basman, but in his book Play the St. George, Basman asserts there is no truth to this. Miles beat Karpov again three years later in Bath in a game that was part of the BBC's Master Game series, but it was shown only by the (co-producing) German television network due to a BBC technicians' strike at the time of broadcast.

Miles won the British Championship once, in 1982 when the event was held in Torquay. His prime time as a chess player was the mid-1980s. On 20 May 1984 in Roetgen (Germany), Miles set a European record in blind simultaneous chess with 22 games (+10−2=10); this record was not broken until 2009. On the January 1984 Elo rating list, he ranked No. 18 in the world with a rating of 2599. One of his best results occurred at the Tilburg tournament in 1984, where, from a strong field, he emerged sole winner by a clear margin of one and one-half points. The following year, he tied for first at the same event with Robert Hübner and Viktor Korchnoi, playing several of his games while lying face down on a table, having injured his back. The result was controversial, as many of Miles's opponents felt they were distracted by the unusual circumstances. A string of good performances culminated in a good showing on the January 1986 Elo rating list, where he climbed to a best-ever position of World No. 9 with a rating of 2610. During this period, there was considerable rivalry with John Nunn over who was the United Kingdom's best player, the two protagonists regularly leapfrogging each other in the world rankings. Nigel Short and Jon Speelman soon added to the competition, as the English national squad entered its strongest period.

Never able to qualify out of the Interzonal stages into the Candidates' series, Miles eventually lost the race to become the first British Candidate when Short did so in 1985. However, he retained top board for England at the Thessaloniki and Dubai Olympiads of 1984 and 1986, helping the team to silver medals at each.

Against Garry Kasparov, Miles had little success, not winning a game against him, and losing a 1986 match in Basel by the score of 5½–½. Following this encounter, Miles commented "I thought I was playing the world champion, not a monster with a thousand eyes who sees everything" (some sources alternatively quote Miles as having the opinion that Kasparov had 22 or 27 eyes).

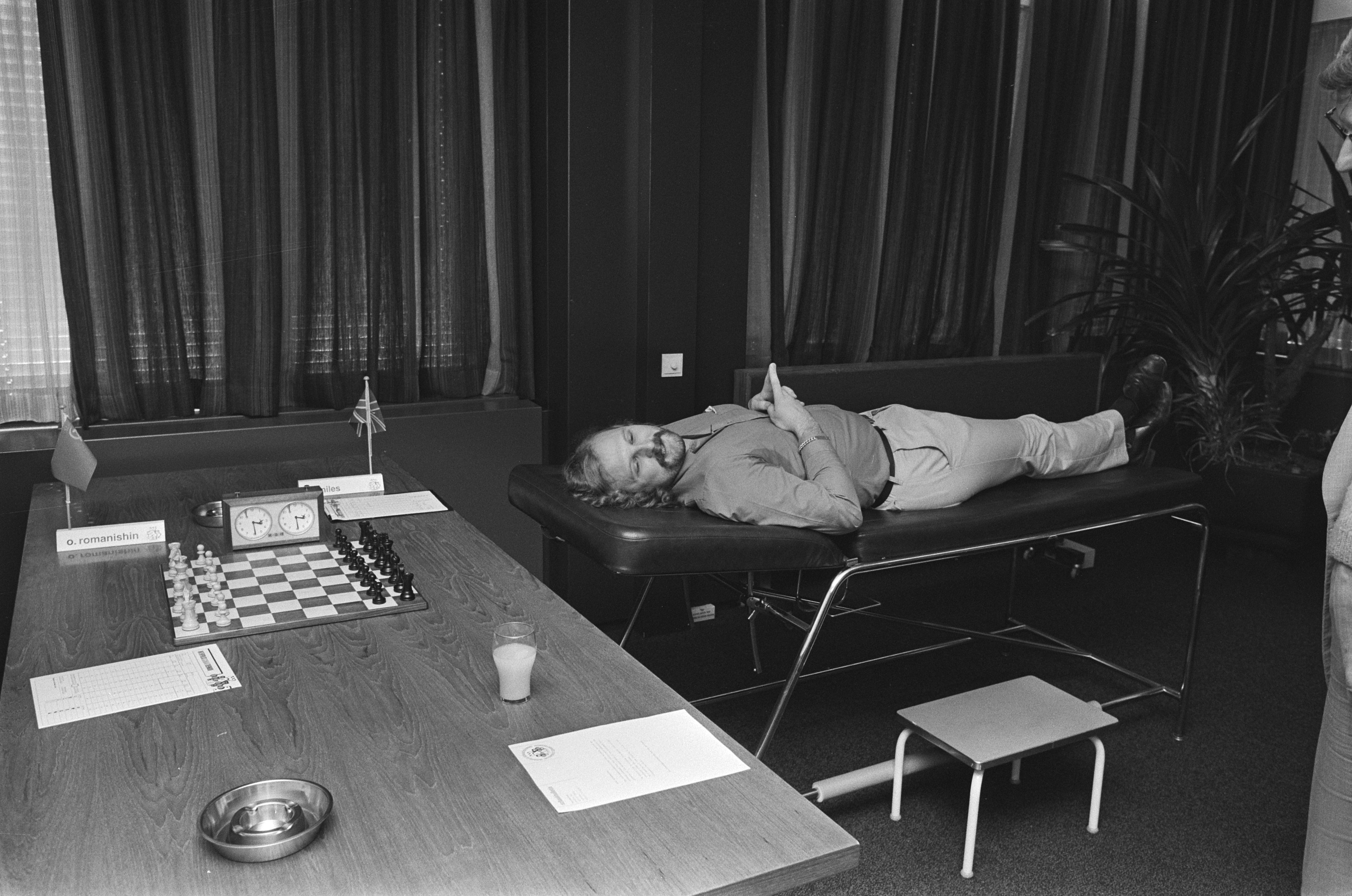
Miles on a stretcher with back pain, playing in Tilburg (1985)

After he was hospitalised because of a mental breakdown in late 1987, Miles moved to the United States. He finished last in the 1988 U.S. Championship, but continued to play there and had some good results, such as a victory in the 1990 U.S. Masters Chess Championship. In 1991, he played in the Championship of Australia, but eventually moved back to England and began to represent his native country again. He was equal first at the very strong Cappelle-la-Grande Open in 1994, 1995, and 1997, and caused a shock at the PCA Intel Rapid Chess Grand Prix in London in 1995, when he knocked out Vladimir Kramnik in the first round and Loek van Wely in the second. His bid to win the event was finally halted in the semifinal by English teammate Michael Adams.

There were four notable victories at the Capablanca Memorial in Cuba (1994, 1995, 1996, and 1999). Miles also tied for first in the 1999 Continental Open in Los Angeles with Alexander Beliavsky, Ľubomír Ftáčnik and Suat Atalık. His last tournament victory was the 2001 Canadian Open Chess Championship in Sackville, New Brunswick.

Miles entered and played at the 2001 British Championship in Scarborough, but withdrew before the final round, apparently because of ill health. His final two games before his death were short draws in the Four Nations Chess League. Miles played in an extraordinary number of chess events during his career, including many arduous weekend tournaments.

The Miles Variation (1.d4 Nf6 2.c4 e6 3.Nf3 b6 4.Bf4) in the Queen's Indian Defence is named after him.

== Death ==
Miles died from heart failure on 12 November 2001. His body was found at his home in Harborne, Birmingham, after a friend called on him to take him to a bridge club. He had suffered from diabetes and a post-mortem examination found that this contributed to his death. He was cremated at Lodge Hill Crematorium in Selly Oak on 23 November. There was a moment of silence before the seventh round of the European Team Championships in León, Spain, in his memory.

== Personality ==
Miles was often seen as a controversial figure. Once, in the last round of a tournament (Luton, UK, 1975), with Miles needing a draw for first place, and his opponent, Stewart Reuben, wanting a draw for a high placing, he agreed a draw without playing any moves. The arbiter decided to give both players no points for this non-game; the players claimed this "game" had been played often, when players prearranged a draw – this was the only time it had been scored 0–0, rather than playing out some meaningless moves. This sparked lengthy correspondence in British chess journals.

Miles also clashed with chess authorities and with his fellow English players, particularly Keene and Short. Miles made accusations regarding payments that Keene had received from the British Chess Federation for acting as his assistant in the 1985 Interzonal tournament in Tunis. Miles became obsessed with the affair, eventually suffering a mental breakdown over it. He was arrested in September 1987 in Downing Street, apparently under the belief that he had to speak to then-Prime Minister Margaret Thatcher about the matter; he was subsequently hospitalised for two months. Writing in The Daily Telegraph in November 2003, Short said that "Tony was insanely jealous of my success, and his inability to accept that he was no longer the UK's number one was an indication of, if not a trigger for, his descent into madness."

Miles was also noted for his acerbic wit; according to Genna Sosonko, he was "a master of the laconic barb, the sarcastic remark, and he was never at a loss for words". He often attacked chess personalities in published articles. He attacked former World Champion Anatoly Karpov in an article entitled "Has Karpov Lost his Marbles?" His review of Eric Schiller's book Unorthodox Chess Openings (Cardoza Publishing, 1998) which appeared in Kingpin consisted of just two words: "Utter crap."

== Notable games ==
- Karpov vs. Miles, Skara 1980. St. George Defence: 0–1. The game between Karpov and Miles with the opening line 1.e4 a6.
- Miles vs. Spassky, 1982. Queen's Indian Opening: 1–0. A crushing sacrificial attack against Spassky, then still one of the world's strongest players.
- Karpov vs. Miles, Bath 1983, Caro–Kann: 0–1. Another win against Karpov – then world champion – and again with black. Miles chooses a less popular system in the Caro–Kann and succeeds in creating an unbalanced game where both sides can play for the win.
