= 27th Chess Olympiad =

1986 chess tournament in Dubai, United Arab Emirates

The official logo for the Olympiad.

The 27th Chess Olympiad (Arabic: أولمبياد الشطرنج ال27, uwlimbiad al-shatranj al-27), organized by FIDE and comprising an open and a women's tournament, as well as several other events designed to promote the game of chess, took place between November 14 and December 2, 1986, in Dubai, United Arab Emirates.

Once again, the Olympiad was marred by politics. With the event being held in an Arab nation, Israel couldn't participate, being in an official state of war with several Arab countries. In protest, Western European nations like Denmark, Norway, Sweden, and the Netherlands didn't come to Dubai. Strong individual players like Viktor Korchnoi, Robert Hübner, and Eric Lobron also stayed away.

With no championship match in progress at the time, the Soviet Union was again able to field the strongest possible team, led by reigning world champion Kasparov and ex-champion Karpov. Even so, they only finished half a point ahead of England, and they only managed to capture the top spot in the last round. The United States, who had led the table after the penultimate round, had to settle for the bronze medals.

== Open event ==
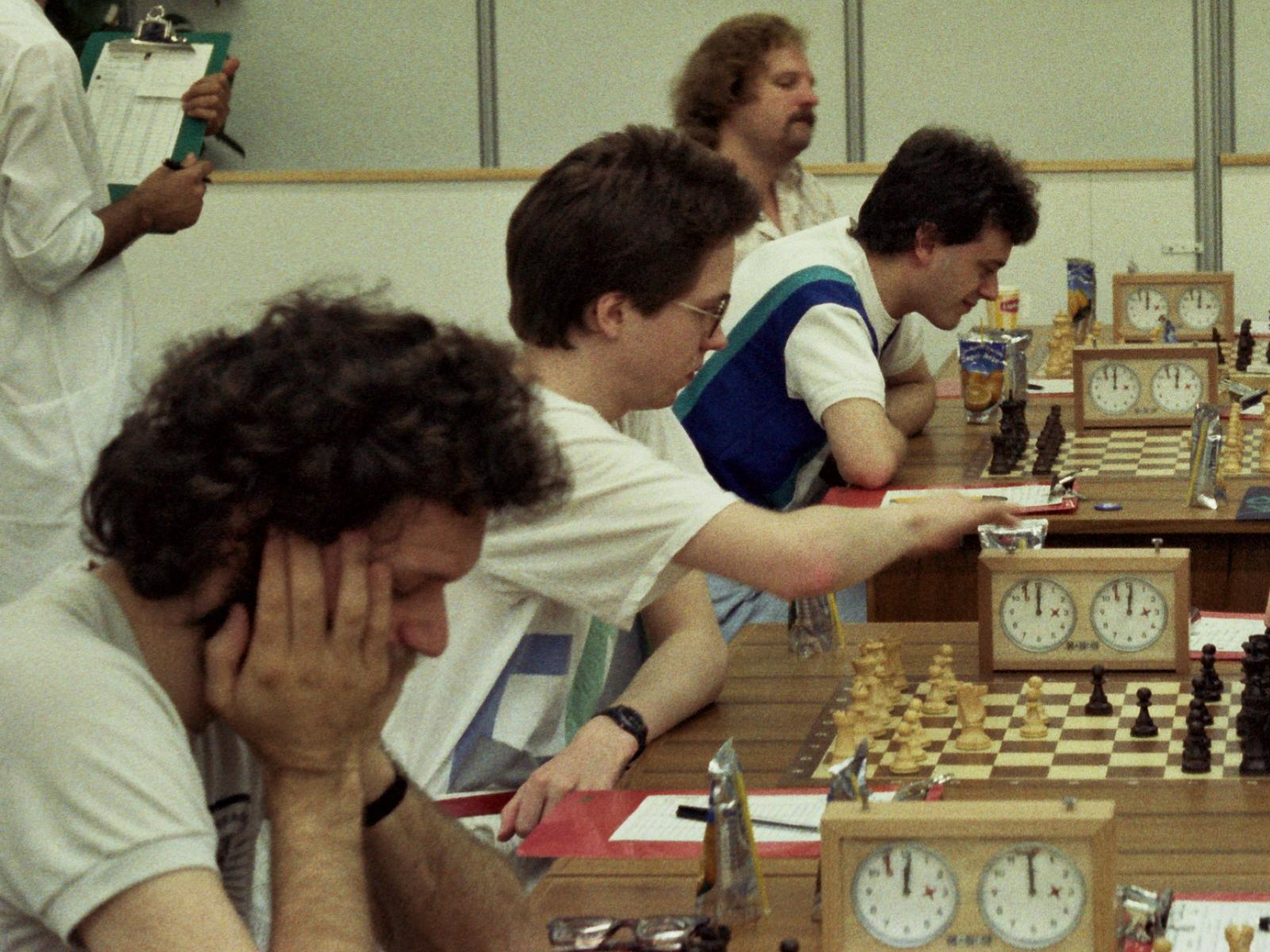
The English team: Speelman, Short, Nunn, Miles

For the first time, the number of participants reached triple digits. 108 teams from 107 different nations played a 14-round Swiss system tournament. In the event of a draw, the tie-break was decided first by using the Buchholz system, then by match points.

Open event
#	Country	Players	Average rating	Points
1	Soviet Union	Kasparov, Karpov, Sokolov, Yusupov, Vaganian, Tseshkovsky	2681	40
2	England	Miles, Nunn, Short, Chandler, Speelman, Flear	2585	39½
3	United States	Seirawan, Christiansen, Kavalek, Fedorowicz, De Firmian, Dlugy	2555	38½

#	Country	Average rating	Points	Buchholz	MP
4	Hungary	2584	34½		
5	Iceland	2526	34	466.0	
6	Bulgaria	2479	34	465.0	
7	China	2448	34	432.5	
8	Czechoslovakia	2523	33	456.5	
9	Cuba	2510	33	452.0	
10	France	2499	33	443.5	
11	Argentina	2501	33	443.0	
12	Peru	2380	33	426.5	
13	West Germany	2473	32½	436.0	
14	Austria	2394	32½	421.0	
15	Yugoslavia	2580	32	466.5	
16	Poland	2445	32	446.0	
17	Portugal	2385	32	420.0	
18	Romania	2525	31½	466.5	
19	Indonesia	2418	31½	445.5	
20	Brazil	2433	31½	444.0	
21	Chile	2451	31½	443.0	
22	Scotland	2395	31½	432.0	
23	Canada	2406	31½	420.0	
24	Spain	2460	31	462.5	
25	India	2389	31	413.5	
26	Greece	2389	31	411.0	
27	Italy	2413	30½	434.0	
28	Philippines	2348	30½	424.0	
29	Switzerland	2413	30½	423.0	
30	Belgium	2355	30½	403.5	
31	Australia	2419	30	426.5	
32	Dominican Republic	2319	30	415.5	
33	Singapore	2281	30	413.5	17
34	Finland	2415	30	413.5	15
35	Colombia	2403	30	405.5	
36	Paraguay	2280	30	399.5	
37	New Zealand	2321	30	396.5	
38	Iraq	2214	30	393.5	
39	Turkey	2344	29½	425.5	
40	Egypt	2269	29½	419.0	
41	Mexico	2316	29½	409.5	
42	Malaysia	2271	29½	385.0	
43	Ecuador	2323	29	420.5	
44	Nicaragua	2264	29	412.5	
45	Tunisia	2293	29	409.0	
46	Ireland	2290	29	408.0	
47	Venezuela	2243	29	404.0	
48	Pakistan	2315	29	402.0	
49	Lebanon	2239	29	391.0	
50	Uruguay	2254	28½	403.0	
51	Wales	2314	28½	401.0	
52	Puerto Rico	2255	28½	399.0	
53	Guatemala	2264	28½	397.5	
54	El Salvador	2233	28½	391.5	
55	Costa Rica	2239	28	389.5	
56	Malta	2251	28	388.5	
57	Andorra	2215	28	373.5	
58	Syria	2306	27½	417.0	
59	Thailand	2234	27½	394.5	
60	Bolivia	2213	27½	388.5	
61	Morocco	2200	27½	381.5	
62	Trinidad and Tobago	2201	27½	374.0	
63	North Yemen	2200	27½	373.5	
64	Palestine	2200	27½	361.5	
65	Bangladesh	2266	27	400.5	
66	Nigeria	2201	27	383.0	
67	Guernsey and Jersey	2218	27	377.0	
68	Jordan	2200	27	374.0	
69	Hong Kong	2240	27	373.0	
70	Honduras	2200	27	372.5	
71	Luxembourg	2203	26½	394.5	
72	United Arab Emirates	2221	26½	384.0	
73	Zimbabwe	2200	26½	364.0	
74	Haiti	2200	26½	362.5	
75	San Marino	2200	26½	353.0	
76	Sri Lanka	2280	26	402.5	
77	Algeria	2203	26	394.0	
78	Angola	2206	26	387.0	
79	Libya	2203	26	367.5	
80	Mauritania	2200	26	334.5	
81	Mali	2200	26	329.5	
82	Bahrain	2200	26	321.0	
83	United Arab Emirates "B"	2201	25½	372.0	
84	Uganda	2201	25½	354.5	
85	Zambia	2201	25½	351.5	
86	Panama	2200	25	366.5	
87	Barbados	2200	25	363.0	
88	Senegal	2200	25	330.5	
89	Cyprus	2200	24½	379.5	
90	Japan	2200	24½	367.0	
91	South Yemen	2200	24½	360.0	
92	Jamaica	2203	24	372.0	
93	Kenya	2211	24	365.0	
94	Sudan	2200	24	347.0	
95	Ghana	2200	24	336.5	
96	Fiji	2200	24	310.0	
97	Brunei	2200	23½	336.5	
98	Netherlands Antilles	2200	23½	324.5	
99	Qatar	2200	23	346.0	
100	Antigua and Barbuda	2200	23	332.0	
101	Papua New Guinea	2204	23	308.5	
102	British Virgin Islands	2201	22	328.5	
103	Bahamas	2200	22	307.5	
104	Bermuda	2200	20	312.5	
105	Mauritius	2200	20	300.5	
106	Botswana	2200	18½		
107	Gambia	2200	14½		
108	Seychelles	2200	5		

=== Individual medals ===
- Performance rating: (Soviet Union) Garry Kasparov 2746
- Board 1: (Soviet Union) Garry Kasparov 8½ / 11 = 77.3%
- Board 2: (Egypt) Imed Abdelnabbi 9½ / 12 = 79.2%
- Board 3: (England) Nigel Short 10 / 13 = 76.9%
- Board 4: (Soviet Union) Artur Yusupov 10 / 12 = 83.3%
- 1st reserve: (Puerto Rico) Luís Muñiz 6 / 7 = 85.7%
- 2nd reserve: (Malaysia) Ng Ek Teong 6 / 7 = 85.7%

== Women's event ==
A total of 49 nations took part. In the event of a draw, the tie-break was decided first by using the Buchholz system, then by match points.

Like the open event, the women's tournament was dominated by the Soviet Union, captained by world champion Chiburdanidze, who won the gold medals by a comfortable margin. Hungary and Romania took silver and bronze, respectively.

The real star of the women's event, though, was 45-year-old ex-world champion Gaprindashvili, who won all of her 10 games and finished with an uncanny performance rating of 2877 – more than 100 points better than the best male.

#	Country	Players	Average rating	Points	Buchholz
1	Soviet Union	Chiburdanidze, Akhmilovskaya, Gaprindashvili, Alexandria	2358	33½	
2	Hungary	Verőci-Petronić, Mádl, Ivánka, Grosch	2247	29	
3	Romania	Mureșan, Nuțu, Polihroniade, Stanciu-Olărașu	2178	28	343.5

#	Country	Average rating	Points	Buchholz
4	China	2133	28	342.0
5	Yugoslavia	2190	25½	
6	West Germany	2153	25	
7	Poland	2237	24½	350.0
8	England	2222	24½	344.0
9	Bulgaria	2148	23½	
10	Cuba	2063	23	
11	Brazil	2005	22½	303.0
12	Austria	1967	22½	288.0
13	Finland	1903	22½	287.5
14	Spain	2087	22	339.5
15	France	2067	22	327.5
16	United States	2055	22	318.0
17	Scotland	1903	22	306.5
18	Greece	1977	21½	324.5
19	India	2083	21½	311.5
20	Ireland	1928	21½	305.0
21	Wales	1988	21½	291.5
22	Mexico	1900	21½	235.5
23	Switzerland	2055	21	313.5
24	Argentina	1907	21	308.5
25	Indonesia	1925	21	302.0
26	Turkey	1912	21	299.5
27	Belgium	1902	21	291.0
28	Italy	1900	21	287.0
29	Colombia	1913	20½	309.5
30	Philippines	1900	20½	301.5
31	Dominican Republic	1902	20½	294.5
32	Bangladesh	1960	20½	286.0
33	Australia	1933	20½	278.0
34	United Arab Emirates	1900	20½	228.5
35	Iraq	1900	20	263.0
36	Guatemala	1900	20	246.5
37	Venezuela	1900	20	221.5
38	Uruguay	1900	20	218.0
39	Japan	1903	19½	289.0
40	Malaysia	1900	19½	263.0
41	New Zealand	1902	19½	255.5
42	Portugal	1902	19½	251.0
43	Syria	1900	19½	229.0
44	Puerto Rico	1900	18½	
45	Trinidad and Tobago	1902	16½	223.5
46	Jamaica	1900	16½	221.0
47	Nigeria	1900	15½	
48	Seychelles	1900	5½	
49	Panama	1900	2½	

=== Individual medals ===
- Performance rating: (Soviet Union) Nona Gaprindashvili 2877
- Board 1: (Switzerland) Tatjana Lematschko 9½ / 11 = 86.4%
- Board 2: (United Arab Emirates) Faridah Karim 7 / 8 = 87.5%
- Board 3: (Soviet Union) Nona Gaprindashvili 10 / 10 = 100.0%
- Reserve: (Romania) Gabriela Stanciu-Olărașu 7 / 9 = 77.8%
