= Tony Priday =

Richard Anthony (Tony) Priday (13 August 1922 – 9 October 2014) was an English bridge player and journalist, who had a longstanding and successful partnership with Claude Rodrigue. He was a member of Great Britain teams that finished third in the 1962 Bermuda Bowl and the 1976 World Team Olympiad, and those that won European Bridge League (EBL) championship teams-of-four in 1961 (when he was partnered by Alan Truscott) and came second in 1971.

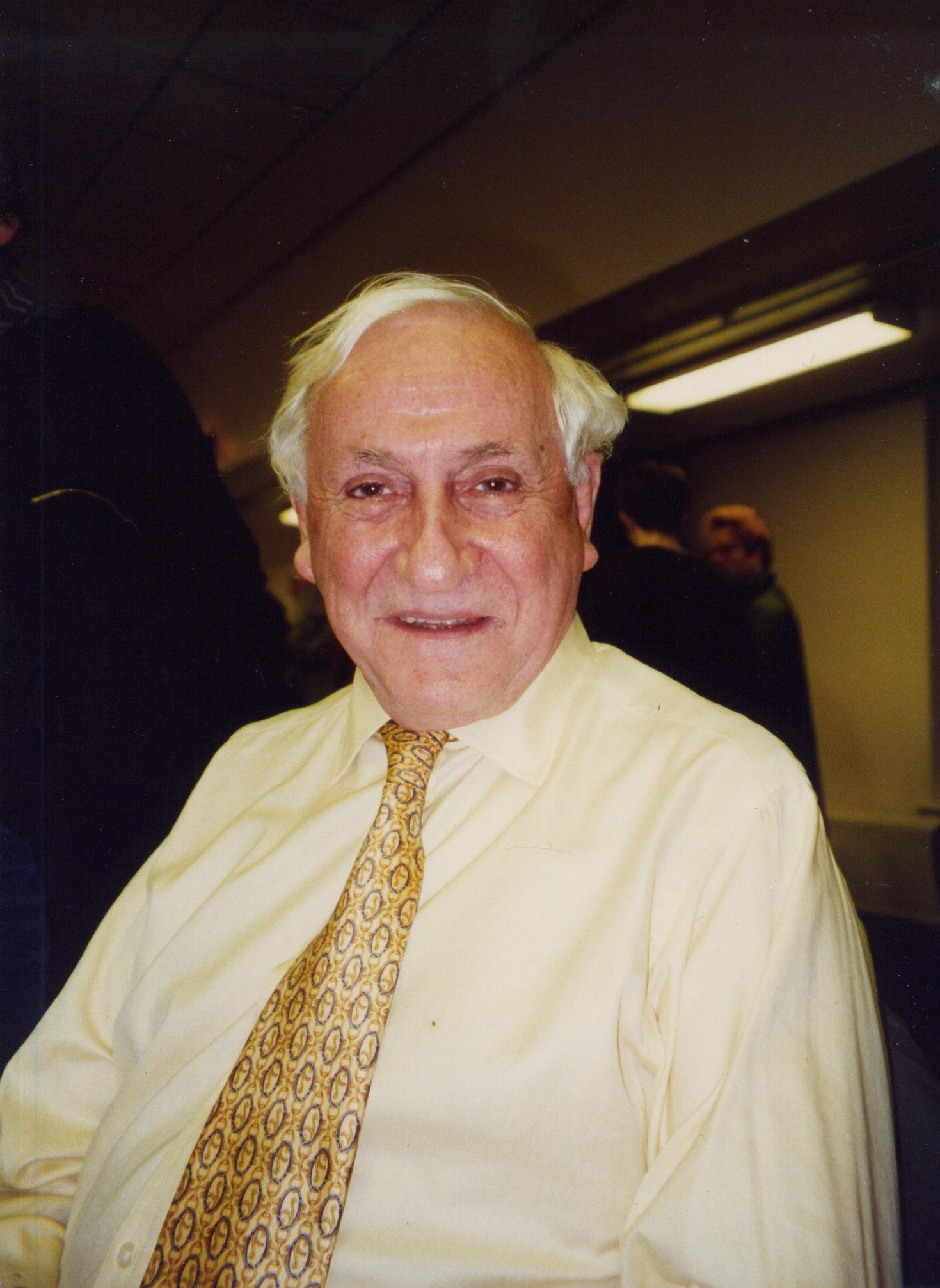
Richard Anthony (Tony) Priday

== Bridge career ==
He learned bridge at prep school and his father's club, "read lots of books on the game" before the war, and "practised it enthusiastically most days of the week" after the war. His first successful partnership was with Charles Tatham in the early 1950s. Subsequently, he notably partnered Jeremy Flint and Maurice Harrison-Gray. After Gray's death he formed his partnership with Rodrigue. During the 1970s they were selected to play in nine consecutive major international championships, an unparalleled feat for a British pair.

Priday played in the World Team Olympiad three times (1972, 1976, 1980) and in the EBL Championships eight times between 1961 and 1979. He also won the Sunday Times Invitational Pairs, a prestigious tournament that featured some of the world's strongest partnerships, with Nico Gardener in 1970.

He was selected 30 times for England in the annual "home international" tournament for the Camrose Trophy, with a record of won 24, drew 3 and lost 3. His first appearance was in 1955 and the last in 2002. He won the Gold Cup on seven occasions between 1964 and 1976.

Priday was an independent assessor of the technical evidence at the British Bridge League inquiry into the allegation of cheating by Terence Reese and Boris Schapiro during the 1965 World Teams Championship (Bermuda Bowl) in Buenos Aires.

He was renowned for his correct demeanour at the bridge table. In a survey of 23 leading British players, 13 chose him when asked to name the "perfect gentleman/woman". In 1976 he called the reputation "not always justified" but recalled overhearing a player say, "I'm surprised he is playing for Britain. He is much too polite to be a bridge player."

In 1983, Priday took part in Grand Slam, a televised match between teams representing Britain and the US, arranged by the BBC. The British team of Priday, Rodrigue, Nicola Gardener, and Pat Davies won by 32 international match points over 78 deals in seven sessions (the Americans were Neil Silverman, Matt Granovetter, Jacqui Mitchell, and Gail Moss). It was featured in a book that described Priday thus: "He is tall, grey-haired, distinguished and impeccably dressed ... He is also amusing, polite and might appear ripe to be mugged at the Bridge table ... Beneath the velvet lurks a mind of iron ...".

He was non-playing captain of many England and Great Britain teams over a period of almost forty years:

- the Bermuda Bowl (1987), when the British team finished second;
- two World Team Olympiad open flights (1988, 1996);
- the inaugural World Team Olympiad, women flight (1960);
- one Venice Cup, parallel to the Bermuda Bowl but restricted to women (1995);
- four European Teams Championships (1969, 1985, 1987, 1997).

Priday became the bridge correspondent of The Sunday Telegraph when it was launched in 1961 and remained until 1997.

He was made a Life Member of the English Bridge Union (EBU) in 1997 and was its Vice-President and Vice-Chairman. He served on its selection committee for 31 years. He was a Chairman of the British Bridge League.

The 1961 Great Britain team, of which he was a member, toured South Africa after winning the European championship, and there refused to play against all-white teams.

In May 2014 he partnered Bernard Teltscher as part of the sponsor's team in the Teltscher Trophy, the senior players' home internationals. The partnership had a combined age of 182.

In 2015 the EBU inaugurated the Tony Priday Award in his memory, to "be awarded for excellence", not to be limited to achievements on the field of play.

== Life outside bridge ==
Priday was born in London. He attended Winchester College and then joined the King's Royal Rifle Corps, where he achieved the rank of Major during World War II. Shortly before D-Day he was involved in a motorcycle accident that kept him in hospital for nine months and meant that he missed the D-Day landings, in which five men in his unit lost their lives.

In 1947 he joined the family timber business, Sydney Priday & Snewin Ltd, where he became Managing Director in 1968. He retired from the firm in 2001.

In 1966 Priday married Jane Juan, who won that year's quadrennial World Women Pairs Championship and was one of the Great Britain women who won multiple European championships and the 1964 Olympiad. Juan died in 1994 and Priday remarried in 1995, to Vivian. They lived in Marbella, on the Mediterranean coast near Gibraltar, where their typical afternoon included a session of bridge at a club. The Pridays entered Senior and Mixed international competition together.

On 9 October 2014, he died at the age of 92 in Marbella.
