= Jonathan Levitt =

English chess grandmaster (born 1963)

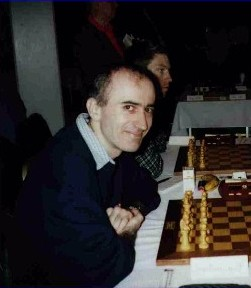
- Levitt in 2004

Personal information
- Born: 3 June 1963 (age 63) London, England

Chess career
- Country: England
- Title: Grandmaster (1990)
- FIDE rating: 2404 (October 2026)
- Peak rating: 2495 (January 1989)

Jonathan Paul Levitt is an English chess grandmaster.

== Biography ==
Levitt studied mathematics at Magdalen College, Oxford from 1982 to 1985.

Levitt wrote chess anecdotes for Garry Kasparov's KasparovChess website, and is also a chess teacher. He wrote the book Genius in Chess, which explores whether there is a link between chess rating and IQ.

In 2005, Levitt won the Howard Staunton Memorial Tournament, beating Jon Speelman in the tiebreaks. He won Morris Sobkowski's chess set through his victory in the event, but re-donated the set back to the Society the following year.

== Personal life ==
Levitt is married with one child.
