= Howard Staunton Memorial Tournament =

Chess tournament

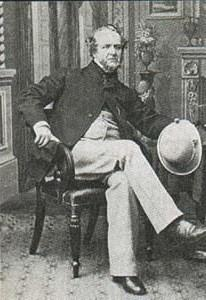
Staunton around 1860

The Howard Staunton Memorial Tournament was an annual chess tournament held between 2003 and 2009 in honour of the English chess player Howard Staunton (1810–1874).

== History ==
The first Staunton Memorial tournament was held in 1946 (at Groningen, Mikhail Botvinnik won, half a point ahead of Max Euwe; 20 strong players). This celebrated the 50 years that had passed since the establishment of the Staunton Chess Club in Groningen, and was the first major chess tournament after World War II. A follow-up Groningen 'mini-memorial' was held in 1996 (Vasily Smyslov won) that comprised the seven surviving participants of the 1946 event, and marked the 100th anniversary of the club.

In 1951, a Staunton Memorial event was held in England (Cheltenham - Lemington Spa - Birmingham, Svetozar Gligorić won). This commemorated the one hundred years that had passed since the London 1851 chess tournament, a landmark event in Staunton's life.

The first edition of the modern series was played in 2003 at Simpson's-in-the-Strand, London, England to mark its 175th birthday; subsequent editions were also held there. Simpson's-in-the-Strand is a restaurant which Staunton regularly visited in the 19th century to play and discuss chess (it was then a coffee house known as "The Divan" or "Simpson's Divan"). In 1851, it was the venue of the famous "Immortal Game", played between Adolf Anderssen and Lionel Kieseritzky.

The first three editions of the Staunton Memorial series had been played as a double round-robin of four, then six players in the third event (British players only). The fourth to sixth edition saw an expansion to twelve participants, contesting a single round robin. The 2006 Staunton Memorial (Ivan Sokolov won) was the strongest invitation tournament to be held in London since 1986. Michael Adams won in 2007 and 2008 (surpassing the edition of 2006 in terms of strength and again claimed the strongest closed tournament played in London since 1986).

In 2009, the seventh and last edition of the Staunton Memorial series was split into two attractions: a double round "Scheveningen" format team match between England and The Netherlands (England won 26.5 - 23.5), and a single round "all-play-all" of ten players, won outright by Jan Timman. Veteran Viktor Korchnoi, who beat Timman in their individual game, finished as sole third.

Funding for the tournament ceased in 2009, and so 2010's event comprised only a celebratory dinner and pro-am exhibition game held to raise funds for Anatoly Karpov's FIDE Presidential campaign. Garry Kasparov and Nigel Short were just two of the guests who participated in the event.

== Winners ==
Below is the list of winners of the Memorial tournament series held in London. The names of winners who have taken the trophy on tie-break are shown in bold typeface.

#	Year	Winner
1	2003	Jon Speelman
2	2004	**Daniel King**; Jon Speelman
3	2005	**Jonathan Levitt**; Jon Speelman
4	2006	Ivan Sokolov
5	2007	Michael Adams
6	2008	Michael Adams
7	2009	Jan Timman

== Team challenge match ==
In its later editions, the tournament also doubled as a UK versus Netherlands match, although the UK team sometimes comprised a mix of home players and overseas guests. The Netherlands won the matches of 2006, 2007 and 2008, while The UK won the match held in 2009.
