= Stewart Reuben =

British chess player, organiser and author (1939–2025)

Personal information
- Born: 14 March 1939 Stepney, London, England
- Died: 4 February 2025 (aged 85) Jamaica

Chess career
- Country: England
- Title: FIDE Candidate Master; FIDE International Arbiter; FIDE International Organizer
- Peak rating: 2270 (January 1978)

Stewart Reuben (14 March 1939 – 4 February 2025) was a British chess player, organiser, arbiter and author. He was also a professional poker player, has been called "one of Britain's foremost poker players" and "one of the best two or three players in England", and had written several books on the topic. Reuben died in Jamaica on 4 February 2025, at the age of 85.

== Chess career ==
Reuben had officiated at and/or organised a number of high-level chess events held in Britain and elsewhere, including the world chess championship, and was the chief organiser of British Chess Championship Congresses for a number of years. He was the chairman of the British Chess Federation from 1996 to 1999, and was recently Manager of Senior Chess for the English Chess Federation. As of 2006, he was chairman of the FIDE Organisers' Committee and a member of other FIDE committees. He held the FIDE International Arbiter and FIDE International Organizer titles.

Reuben was a FIDE Candidate Master. During the 1993 World Chess Championship Match between Kasparov and Short, he provided some of the live commentary for the audience at the Savoy theatre.

=== Author ===
Reuben wrote several books on chess including Chess Openings: Your Choice! and The Chess Organiser's Handbook. He was also the author of several books on poker, including How Good is your Pot-Limit Omaha, How Good is your Pot Limit Hold'Em?, Poker 24/7: 35 years as a Poker Pro, and Starting Out in Poker. Reuben also co-authored Pot-Limit and No-limit Poker with Bob Ciaffone, which Mason Malmuth called "the best information ever put out on these games". His teaching book Play Like a Pro was translated into French as Jouez comme les pros in 2007, and then recommended by the French travel guide publisher Petit Futé for French visitors to Las Vegas.

== Books ==
Chess

- The Chess Scene (1974) Faber ISBN 978-0571104161 (with David Levy)
- Chess Openings: Your Choice! (1995) Cadogan Books ISBN 978-1857440706
- The Chess Organiser's Handbook (1998 1st edition) Everyman Chess ISBN 978-1857441994; (2001 new edition) ISBN 978-0954098209
- London 1980: Phillips and Drew Kings Chess Tournament (2010) Ishi Press ISBN 4-87187-859-7 (with William Hartston)

Poker

- Pot-Limit & No-Limit Poker (1999 2nd edition) ISBN 978-0966100716 (with Bob Ciaffone)
- Starting Out in Poker (2001) Everyman Chess ISBN 978-1857442724
- How Good is Your Pot-Limit Omaha? (2004) D&B Publishing ISBN 978-1904468073
- How Good is Your Pot Limit Hold'em? (2004) D&B Publishing ISBN 978-1904468080
- An Introduction to Poker (2005) Parragon Publishing ISBN 978-1405461566
- Poker 24/7: 35 Years as a Poker Pro (2005) D&B Publishing ISBN 978-1904468165

== Notable games ==
- Stewart Reuben vs Robert James Fischer, New York blitz 1963, English Opening: Anglo-Indian Defense (A16), ½–½
- Stewart Reuben vs David Bronstein, London Menchik-mem 1994, English Opening: Agincourt Defense (A13), ½–½
