= Jonathan Mestel =

British chess grandmaster and mathematician (born 1957)

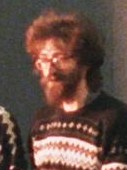
- Mestel in 1988

Personal information
- Born: Andrew Jonathan Mestel; 13 March 1957 (age 69) Cambridge, England

Chess career
- Country: England
- Title: Grandmaster (1982)
- World Champion: World Cadet Champion 1974, World Solving Champion 1997
- FIDE rating: 2417 (July 2026)
- Peak rating: 2540 (January 1984)
- Peak ranking: No. 35 (July 1984)

Andrew Jonathan Mestel (born 13 March 1957 in Cambridge, England) is a British mathematician and chess grandmaster. He holds the position of Professor of Applied Mathematics at Imperial College London. He worked on magnetohydrodynamics and biological fluid dynamics. He obtained his PhD with the thesis "Magnetic Levitation of Liquid Metals" at University of Cambridge.

== Career ==
A distinguished chess player, he was the first person to be awarded chess Grandmaster titles by FIDE in both over-the-board play and problem solving. He has also represented England at contract bridge.

He announced his arrival on the international chess scene by winning the World Cadet Championship in 1974 at Pont-Sainte-Maxence. In the same year he nearly won the British Chess Championship, figuring in a seven-way play-off at Clacton, but failing to clinch the title at the last hurdle. Playing in Tjentiste in 1975, he took the bronze medal at the World Junior Championship, finishing behind Valery Chekhov and Larry Christiansen. There followed a string of British Championship successes, where he took the title in 1976, 1983 and 1988. His victory at Portsmouth in 1976 was remarkable for a start of nine consecutive wins, a record for the competition.

Along the way, Mestel was awarded the Grandmaster (GM) title in 1982 and became a Chess Solving Grandmaster and the World Chess Solving Champion in 1997. With fellow GM John Nunn, he is a medal-winning member of the British Chess Solving Team.

Between 1976 and 1988 he was a frequent member of the English Chess Olympiad squad, winning three team medals (two silver and one bronze). In 1984, he earned an individual gold medal for an outstanding (7/9, 78%) performance on his board. Other notable results for English teams occurred in 1978 at the World Student Olympiad in Mexico and at the 1983 European Team Chess Championship in Plovdiv. Both of these events yielded gold-medal-winning performances, the latter being exceptional for the highest percentage score (6/7, 85%) on any board. As a player of league chess, he has been a patron of the 4NCL since its earliest days and represented The Gambit ADs in the 2008/9 season.

In international tournaments, his best early result was equal second at London 1977, tying with Miguel Quinteros and Michael Stean, behind winner Vlastimil Hort. There were also good results at Esbjerg, where he won the North Sea Cup in 1979 (with Laszlo Vadasz) and finished with a share of second in 1984 (after Nigel Short, with Lars Karlsson). At Marbella in 1982, he was the co-winner of a zonal tournament, with Nunn, Stean and John van der Wiel. At Hastings, there were good results in 1977/78 (a share of fifth in a strong field) and in 1983/84, when he shared third place (after joint winners Karlsson and Jon Speelman).

Aside from his academic and chess activities, he wrote the mainframe computer game Brand X with Peter Killworth, which was later rewritten for Microsoft Windows and released commercially as Philosopher's Quest.

Better known by his middle name, Jonathan, he is the son of the Jewish astronomer Leon Mestel and was married to Anna O'Donovan from 1982 to her death in 2022. Their son, David Mestel, was born in February 1992.

== See also ==
- List of Jewish chess players
