= Grand Slam (BBC TV) =

1980s televised contract bridge tournament

Grand Slam was the title of three series of duplicate bridge tournaments broadcast on BBC2 television between 1981 and 1983. The first two series were international matches between teams from the United States and the UK, while the third was a British regional knockout competition.

The programmes were presented by Jeremy James and commentary was provided by other bridge experts. For the international series, books were published prior to the broadcasts documenting the boards and recording the players' thoughts as they bid and played the hands.

== International tournament 1 ==
Broadcast in 13 programmes between 11 October 1981 and 3 January 1982, the first tournament featured 65 boards of duplicate bridge. Each US pair played each UK pair in approximately half of the boards. The teams were:

- UK: Jeremy Flint and Claude Rodrigue; Pat Davies and Nicola Gardener
- US: Matthew Granovetter and Neil Silverman; Jacqui Mitchell (as Jackie Mitchell) and Gail Moss

The commentator was John Beard. After opening up a wide lead and losing it again, the British team eventually won the tournament by 7 IMPs.

== International tournament 2 ==
The second international tournament was played at Painswick House, Gloucestershire, and broadcast between 20 February and 14 May 1983. There were 78 deals in seven sessions, and a prize of £8,000. With one exception, the teams were as in the first series:

- UK: Tony Priday and Rodrigue; Gardener and Davies
- US: Silverman and Granovetter; Moss and Mitchell

Commentary was by Jeremy Flint. The British team won again, this time by 32 IMPs.

== Regional tournament ==
Later in 1983, from 10 September to 10 December, BBC2 broadcast a knockout tournament among teams from British bridge clubs. The club pairs were advised by four experts: Jane and Tony Priday, Irving Rose, and Victor Mollo. The teams were: Birmingham, Southampton, Buchanan (Scotland), Croesyceiliog (Wales), Bristol, St John's Wood "A" and "B", and Manchester. Two programmes were devoted to each match.

Broadcast commentary was provided by Jeremy Flint, Victor Mollo, and Tony Priday.
