= Jeremy James (presenter) =

British television presenter

- James presenting The Master Game
- Born: 12 March 1936; Portishead, U.K.
- Died: 23 August 2015 (aged 79); Saint-Maurice-de-Lignon, France
- Occupation: Television presenter
- Television: Man Alive; The Master Game
- Spouse: Gillian Molteno (m. 1969–1979)
- Children: 2

Jeremy James (1936 – 2015) was a British television presenter.

James worked as presenter, reporter and producer for the long-running BBC documentary series Man Alive. This included presenting the controversial 1967 episode Consenting Adults, interviewing homosexual men. His interest in bridge and chess led to later roles: presenting coverage of the World Bridge Championships and Grand Slam, the World Chess Championships and The Master Game.
