= Alan Phillips (chess player) =

British chess master and author

Alan Phillips (28 October 1923 – 24 June 2009) was a chess master who won the British Chess Championship in 1954, along with Leonard Barden. He was one of the stars in the Stockport Grammar School chess club started by Richard K. Guy in 1939. After World War II, he studied at University of Cambridge, where he tied with Peter Swinnerton-Dyer for the university chess championship. He is the author of a number of articles and books on chess, including

- Chess: Sixty years on with Caissa & Friends, Caissa Editions, 2003
- The Chess Teacher, Oxford University Press, 1978
