= William Hartston =

English chess player and writer (born 1947)

Personal information
- Born: William Roland Hartston; 12 August 1947 (age 79) Willesden, Middlesex, England
- Spouses: Jana Malypetrová (m. 1970, divorced) Elizabeth Bannerman (m. 1978)

Chess career
- Country: England
- Title: International Master (1973)
- FIDE rating: 2430 (September 2026)
- Peak rating: 2485 (January 1979)

William Roland Hartston (born 12 August 1947) is an English journalist who has written the Beachcomber column in the Daily Express since 1998. He is also a chess player who played competitively from 1962 to 1987 and earned a highest Elo rating of 2485. He was awarded the title International Master in 1972, but is now best known as a chess author and presenter of the game on television.

== Biography ==
Hartston was born in Willesden, Middlesex, England, and attended the City of London School before studying Mathematics at Jesus College, Cambridge.

At the 19th Chess Olympiad, held at Siegen 1970, he won the gold medal for best score on board 3 (78.1%). He won the British Chess Championship in 1973 and 1975. In international competition, he had many strong performances but failed, by the smallest possible margin, to achieve the results required for the title of International Grandmaster. Hartston became the first person to stack the pieces from an entire chess set on top of a single white rook. He studied mathematics at Jesus College, Cambridge but did not complete his PhD on number theory as he spent too much time playing chess.

From the early 1970s, Hartston made many TV appearances for the BBC, usually in the role of expert commentator and analyst on world title matches, including Fischer-Spassky '72, Karpov-Korchnoi '78, Kasparov-Short '93 and Kasparov-Anand '95. On December 7, 1990, he was featured in an experimental interactive BBC2 broadcast called Your Move, which was hosted by Rob Curling and featured grandmaster Jon Speelman. In the groundbreaking one-off episode, Speelman was pitted against the audience, who would use a special telephone line to submit their moves, with the move played by the viewers being decided by a democratic vote. Speelman won the match, although the viewers put up a good fight. The broadcast went for approximately three hours, about double the time that it had been scheduled for.

He twice won the BBC's The Master Game competition before taking over from Leonard Barden as its resident expert. During the 1980s he presented the BBC series Play Chess. In recent years he has diversified into a number of creative areas, running competitions in creative thinking for The Independent newspaper and the Mind Sports Olympiad. Since January 1996 he has written the off-beat Beachcomber column for the Daily Express and has also written books on chess, mathematics, humour and trivia. He has also been a regular guest on the BBC Radio 4 and occasional TV programme, Puzzle Panel and appeared in Series 8 of The Museum of Curiosity also on Radio 4.

Aside from his chess and media-related activities, Hartston is a mathematician and industrial psychologist. During the 1980s, he was recruited by Meredith Belbin, at the Industrial Training Research Unit in Cambridge, to research the dynamics of teams. While continuing to write the Beachcomber column and other features for the Daily Express, he was also behind the launching of the now defunct wakkipedia.com Internet site of useless information. His latest publication is A Brief History of Puzzles: 120 of the World's Most Baffling Brainteasers from the Sphinx to Sudoku (2019).

On 2 April 2013 it was reported that Hartston had "perfected" a formula for predicting the winner of the Grand National horse race, in a study commissioned by bookmaker William Hill. The story of the winning formula has since been widely thought to be an April Fools joke for which many have fallen.

In 2013 Hartston and his friend Josef Kollar became regular 'viewers' on the Channel 4 programme Gogglebox.

In 2023 his book Knock, knock! In pursuit of a grand unified theory of humour was published by Watkins Media.

== Personal life ==
Hartston was the first of three British chess champions to be married to Woman Grandmaster Jana Bellin (née Malypetrova) (January 1970 in Cambridge). With his second wife, Elizabeth Bannerman (1978) he has two sons, James and Nicholas.

== Bibliography ==
- The Grunfeld Defence (1971), B. T. Batsford ISBN 0-713-4035-51
- The King's Indian Defence (1973) (L. Barden, with W. Hartston and R. Keene), B. T. Batsford
- Karpov-Korchnoi, 1974 (1977) (W. Hartston and R. Keene), Tony Earl Books, ISBN 0-192-1753-00
- The Benoni (1977), Batsford, ISBN 0-713-4024-66
- How to Cheat at Chess: Everything You Always Wanted to Know about Chess, But Were Afraid to Ask. United Kingdom: Hutchinson & Co. (Publishers) Ltd. ISBN 978-0091261115, 0091261112 1st ed. – 1976; ISBN 9781857440997, 1857440994 2nd ed. – 1994
- The Battle of Baguio City: Karpov-Korchnoi 1978 (1978)
- Penguin Book of Chess Openings (1978)
- Soft Pawn: The Uncensored Sequel (1980)
- London 1980: Phillips and Drew Kings Chess Tournament (1980) ISBN 4-87187-859-7 (with Stewart Reuben)
- Teach Yourself Chess (c. 1980, later editions 1992, 1997)
- Psychology of Chess (1984) (W. Hartston and P. C. Wason), Facts on File, ISBN 0-871-9622-68
- The Ultimate Irrelevant Encyclopaedia (1984)
- The Kings of Chess (1985)
- Chess – The Making of the Musical (1986) (Hartston and Tim Rice), Pavilion Books, ISBN 1851450068
- Drunken Goldfish and Other Irrelevant Scientific Research (1988)
- How was it for you, Professor? (1992)
- The Guinness Book of Chess Grandmasters (1996)
- Teach Yourself Better Chess (1997)
- The Book of Numbers: The Ultimate Compendium of Facts About Figures (2000)
- What Are the Chances of That? (2004)
- What's What – The Encyclopedia of Quite Extraordinary Information (2005)
- The Encyclopedia of Useless Information (2007)
- The Things That Nobody Knows (2011)
- Even More Things That Nobody Knows (2015) Allen & Unwin, ISBN 978-1782-3961-09
- Sloths (2019)
- A Brief History of Puzzles: 120 of the World's Most Baffling Brainteasers from the Sphinx to Sudoku (2019)
- The Encyclopaedia of Everything Else (2022)
- Knock, knock! In pursuit of a grand unified theory of humour (2023) Watkins Media ISBN 978-1786-7873-54

Hartston has also written various technical chess books under his full name of William R. Hartston or William Roland Hartston.
