= Matt Granovetter =

American bridge player and writer

Matthew "Matt" Granovetter (born 1950) is an American bridge player and writer. Granovetter is from Jersey City, New Jersey, and graduated from Hunter College. He subsequently moved to Netanya, Israel. After spending 1993 to 2005 in Israel, he returned with his wife Pamela to the US. They now live in Cincinnati.

In pairs competition, Granovetter and Karen McCallum won the 11th quadrennial World Mixed Pairs Championship in 2006, finishing first in a field of 487.

In teams-of-four competition at the world level, Granovetter played on second-place teams in the 1974 Mixed Teams and the 2008 Seniors Teams. The latter, third in a quadrennial series played for the Senior International Cup, was a nonmedal event at the inaugural World Mind Sports Games. Granovetter played with Russ Ekeblad on a US team that won its 5-day preliminary round-robin field of 16 teams, with Japan second. After winning three long knockout matches each, over five more days, Japan defeated the US by merely 202 IMPs to 200 in the two-day final. Granovetter–Ekeblad scored very well in the 5-day preliminaries, third-best of about 100 pairs.

In 1981–2 and 1983, Granovetter took part in Grand Slam, two televised matches between teams representing the US and Britain, arranged by the BBC. The 1983 match was featured in a book that described him thus:

He is a composer and lyricist and he plays bridge like an artist. One moment he is suffused with extrovert optimism, the next he is submerged in gloomy introspection, which leads to some unsound overbidding and some extreme conservatism. Very often, to achieve the artistically perfect result, he plays so slowly that the whole table seems frozen in some timeless still-life, but he demonstrated time and again that he was one of the best card players on either side.

He and Pamela co-edit the magazine Bridge Today. He has written a number of books about bridge, most of them collaborations with Pamela, as well as musicals for children and mysteries set in the bridge world. He is the bridge editor of the Jerusalem Post.

The Granovetters have developed a bidding system known as the Granovetter Unified System.

== Bridge accomplishments ==
=== Wins ===
- World Mixed Pairs Championship (1) 2006
- North American Bridge Championships (6)
  - Silodor Open Pairs (1) 1972
  - Senior Knockout Teams (1) 2008
  - Mitchell Board-a-Match Teams (2) 1975, 1982
  - Chicago Mixed Board-a-Match (1) 1999
  - Spingold (1) 2009

=== Runners-up ===
- North American Bridge Championships
  - Reisinger (2) 1976, 1977
  - Kaplan Blue Ribbon Pairs (1) 2017
  - Rockwell Mixed Pairs (1) 2019

== Bibliography ==
All his books have been published as by "Matthew Granovetter".

=== Bridge ===
Unless otherwise noted, all the books in this section were co-authored by Pamela Granovetter.

- Tops and Bottoms, C & T Bridge Supplies (1987), ISBN 978-0940257009
- Jenny Mae the Bridge Pro, co-authored with Martin Hoffman, Granovetter Books (1994), ISBN 978-0940257184
- Bridge Addition 96: New Age Inventions Tempered With Old-Fashioned Advice, Granovetter Books (1995), ISBN 978-0940257191. (Matthew Granovetter was the sole author.)
- Forgive Me, Partner! The Guide to a Successful Partnership, co-authored with Pamela Granovetter and Larry Cohen, Granovetter Books (1997)
- Learn to Play Bridge in 9 Minutes, Perigee Trade (2001), ISBN 978-0399526633
- Best of Bridge Today Digest, edited by Matthew and Pamela Granovetter, Master Point Press (2001), ISBN 978-1894154390. (Further collections of Bridge Today articles have been published subsequently.)
- Bridge Conventions in Depth, Master Point Press (2003), ISBN 978-1894154567
- A Switch in Time: How to take ALL your tricks on defense, Granovetter Books ( 2012), ISBN 978-0940257177

==== The GUS bidding system ====
- Gus - Introducing Gus, CreateSpace Independent Publishing Platform (2012), ISBN 978-1480100244
- Gus Weak-Two Bids (Volume 2), CreateSpace Independent Publishing Platform (2012), ISBN 978-1480044616
- Gus One Notrump, CreateSpace Independent Publishing Platform (2013), ISBN 978-1480111684
- Gus One of a Major - Two Clubs (Gus Bridge Bidding System) (Volume 4), CreateSpace Independent Publishing Platform (2014), ISBN 978-1495360466
- One of a Major Bidding (GUS) (Volume 5), CreateSpace Independent Publishing Platform (2014), ISBN 978-1496105721
- GUS One Diamond (Volume 6), CreateSpace Independent Publishing Platform (2014), ISBN 978-1500483838

=== Mysteries ===
- Murder at the Bridge Table (Or, How to Improve Your Duplicate Score Overnight), Granovetter Books (1988)
- The Bridge Team Murders, Granovetter Books (1992), ISBN 978-0940257139
- I Shot My Bridge Partner, Master Point Press (1999), ISBN 978-1894154123

=== Musicals for children ===
- The Princess and the Pauper: A musical play, Dramatic Pub. Co (1983)
- The Treasure Makers, S. French (1984), ISBN 978-0573617355
