= George Botterill =

Welsh chess player, writer and philosopher (born 1949)

Personal information
- Born: 8 January 1949 (age 77) Bradford, England

Chess career
- Country: Wales
- Title: International Master (1978)
- Peak rating: 2430 (January 1984)

George Steven Botterill (born 8 January 1949) is a Welsh chess player, writer and philosopher.

Botterill was born in Bradford and learned chess at the age of seven. From 1969 to 1972 he played for Oxford University, and became one of Britain's leading young players. In 1971 he won the Slater Young Masters tournament at Hastings, and at Hastings 1971/2 he was the top scorer among the British players with 6.0/15. Botterill won the 1974 British Championship at Clacton, winning the playoff at Llanelli, Wales by a half point over William Hartston after a seven-way tie for first. In 1977 Botterill won his second British Championship, this time outright.

Botterill won the Welsh Championship in 1973 (jointly). In 1974 he became a lecturer in philosophy at the University of Wales at Aberystwyth, and began to play for the Welsh international team. In the Preliminary Group of the European Championship he scored 1½–½ against Dutch top board GM Jan Timman and 1–1 against English top board Hartston. Botterill played first board for Wales at the 1976 Olympiad and previously represented England at the World Student Team Championship and European Team Chess Championship of 1973. He holds the title of International Master.

Botterill is best known as a chess writer, in particular for his chess opening collaborations with Raymond Keene: The Modern Defence (London 1973) and The Pirc Defence (London 1974). He is currently Senior Lecturer in Philosophy at the University of Sheffield.
