= John Nunn =

English chess grandmaster (born 1955)

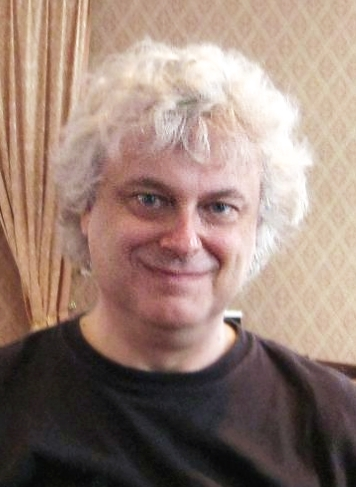
- Nunn in 2010
- Born: John Denis Martin Nunn; 25 April 1955 (age 71); London, England

Academic background
- Education: University of Oxford (D.Phil.)
- Thesis: Some Problems in Algebraic Topology (1978)
- Doctoral advisor: John Hubbuck
- Chess career
- Country: England
- Title: Grandmaster (1978); International Solving Grandmaster (2004)
- World Champion: WC Problem Solving 2004, 2007, 2010; WC (Seniors over-65) 2022, 2023
- FIDE rating: 2513 (October 2026)
- Peak rating: 2630 (January 1995)
- Peak ranking: No. 9 (January 1985)

John Denis Martin Nunn (born 25 April 1955) is an English chess grandmaster, a three-time world champion in chess problem solving, a chess writer and mathematician. He is one of England's strongest chess players and was formerly in the world's top ten.

== Education and early life ==
Nunn was born in London. As a junior, he showed a prodigious talent for chess and in 1967, at 12 years of age, he won the British under-14 Championship. At 14, he was London Under-18 Champion for the 1969–70 season and less than a year later, at just 15 years of age, he proceeded to Oriel College, Oxford, to read mathematics. At the time, Nunn was Oxford's youngest undergraduate since Cardinal Wolsey in 1520. Graduating in 1973, he went on to gain a Doctor of Philosophy degree in 1978 with a thesis on finite H-spaces, supervised by John Hubbuck. In 1978, Nunn spent a year teaching mathematics at Maidstone Grammar School, before returning to Oxford as a mathematics lecturer until 1981, when he became a professional chess player.

== Career ==
In 1975, he became the European Junior Chess Champion. He gained the Grandmaster title in 1978 and was British champion in 1980. Nunn has twice won individual gold medals at Chess Olympiads. In 1989, he finished sixth in the inaugural World Cup, a series of tournaments in which the top 25 players in the world competed. His best performance in the World Chess Championship cycle came in 1987, when he lost a playoff match against Lajos Portisch for a place in the Candidates Tournament. At the prestigious Hoogovens tournament (held annually in Wijk aan Zee) he was a winner in 1982, 1990 and 1991.

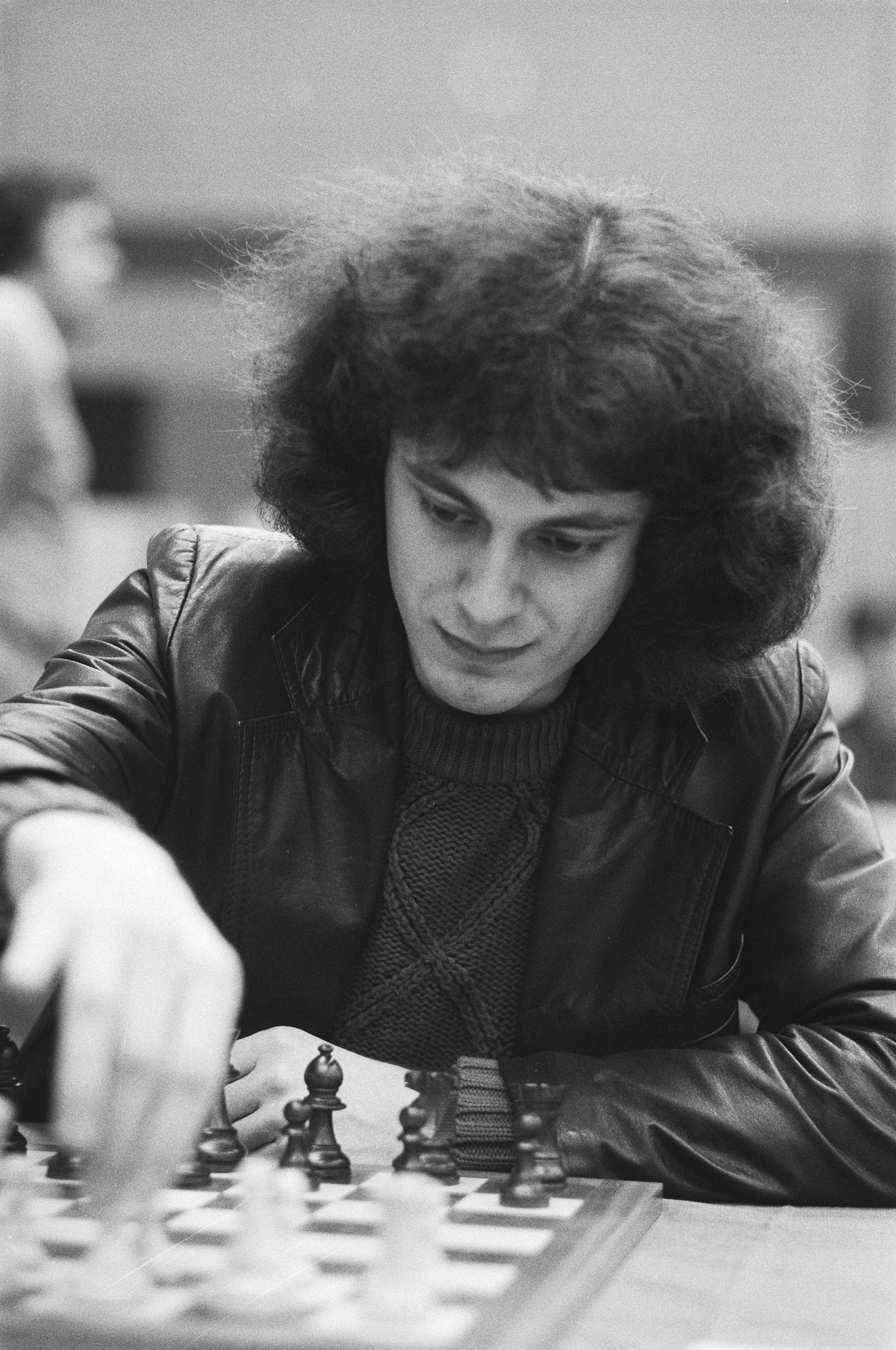
John Nunn in 1982

Nunn achieved his highest Elo rating of 2630 in January 1995. Six years earlier, in January 1989, his then rating of 2620 was high enough to elevate him into the world's top ten, where he shared ninth place. This was close to the peak of the English chess boom, and there were two English players above him on the list: Nigel Short (world number three, 2650) and Jonathan Speelman (world number five, 2640). Nunn has now retired from serious tournament play and, until he resurfaced as a player in two Veterans events in 2014 and 2015, had not played a FIDE-rated game since August 2006; however, he has been active in the ECF rapid play.

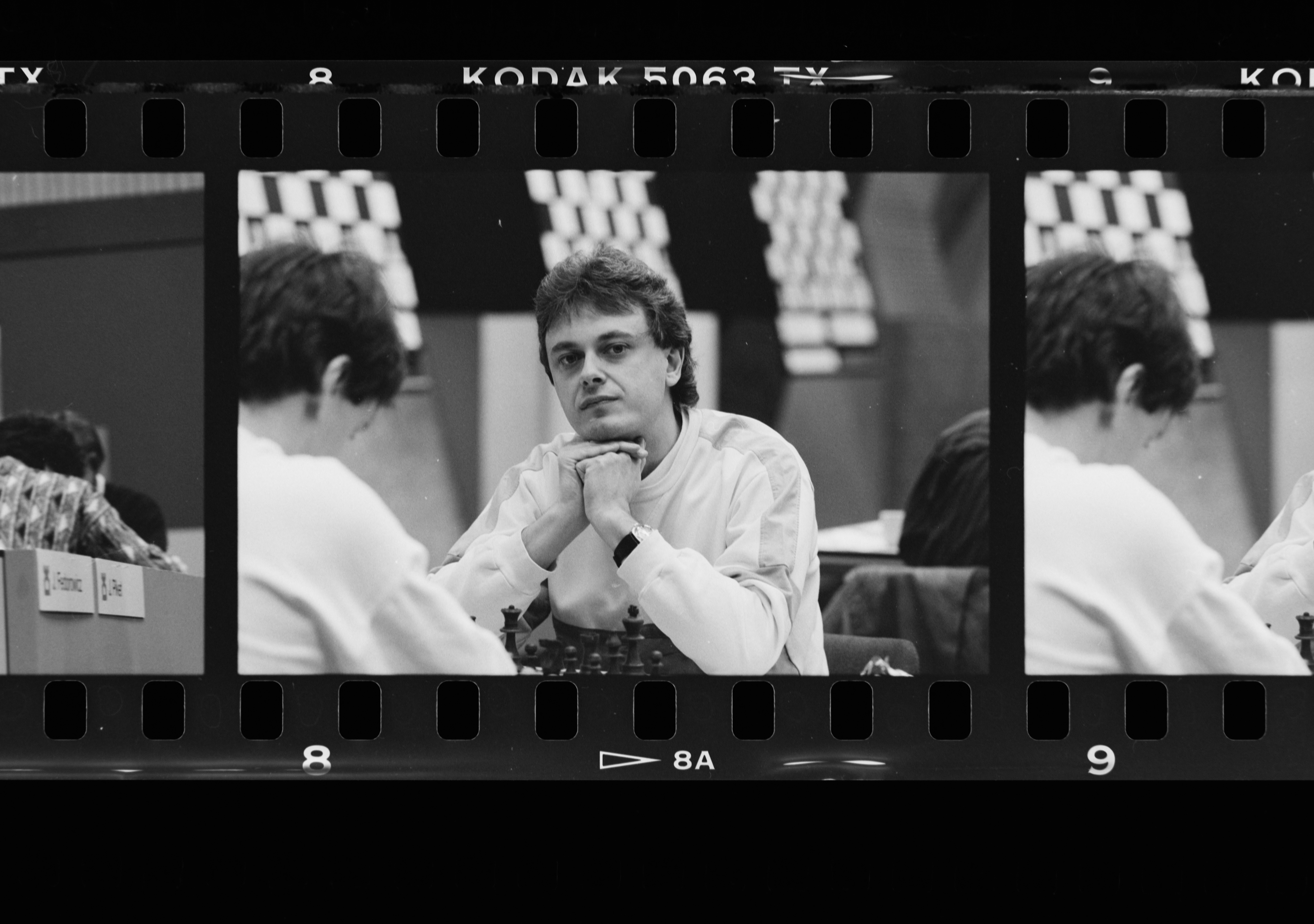
Nunn (Hoogovens, 1991)

As well as being a strong player, Nunn is regarded as one of the best contemporary authors of chess books. He has penned many books, including Secrets of Grandmaster Chess, which won the British Chess Federation Book of the Year award in 1988, and John Nunn's Best Games, which took the award in 1995. He is the director of chess publishers Gambit Publications. Chess historian Edward Winter said:

A polymath, Nunn has written authoritative monographs on openings, endings and compositions, as well as annotated games collections and autobiographical volumes. As an annotator he is equally at home presenting lucid prose descriptions for the relative novice and analysis of extreme depth for the expert.

In 2010, Magnus Carlsen mentioned Nunn in the context of extreme intelligence as a burden:

I am convinced that the reason the Englishman John Nunn never became world champion is that he is too clever for that. ... He has so incredibly much in his head. Simply too much. His enormous powers of understanding and his constant thirst for knowledge distracted him from chess.

Nunn is also involved with chess problems, composing several examples and solving as part of the British team on several occasions. On this subject he wrote Solving in Style (1985). He won the World Chess Solving Championship in Halkidiki, Greece, in September 2004 and also made his final GM norm in problem solving. There were further wins of the World Solving Championship in 2007 and in 2010. He is the third person ever to gain both over-the-board and solving GM titles (the others being Jonathan Mestel and Ram Soffer; Bojan Vučković has been the fourth since 2008).

Nunn has long been interested in computer chess. In 1984, he began annotating games between computers for Personal Computer World magazine, and joined the editorial board of Frederic Friedel's Computerschach & Spiele magazine. In 1987, he was announced as the first editor of the newly created Chessbase magazine. The 1992 release of his first book making use of chess endgame tablebases, Secrets Of Rook Endings, was later followed by Secrets of Minor-Piece Endings, and Secrets Of Pawnless Endings. These books include human-usable endgame strategies found by Nunn (and others) by extensive experimentation with tablebases, and new editions have come out and are due as more tablebases are created and tablebases are more deeply data-mined. Nunn is thus (as of 2004) the foremost data miner of chess endgame tablebases.

Nunn finished third in the World Senior Chess Championship (over-50 section) of 2014 in Katerini, Greece, second in the European Senior Chess Championship (over-50) of 2015 in Eretria, Greece, and first in the World Senior Chess Championship (over-65 section) in Assisi, Italy in 2022. He was the winner again in 2023, at Terrasini.

== Notable games ==
Øst-Hansen vs. Nunn, Teesside 1974

Position: a1 white rook, g2 white pawn, c2 white pawn, b2 white pawn, a2 white pawn, d3 black pawn, b3 white bishop, h4 black queen, g4 white king, g5 black pawn, b6 black pawn, d7 black pawn, c7 white queen, a7 black pawn, f8 black rook, e8 black king, a8 white knight

Final position
- Jacob Øst-Hansen vs John Nunn, World Student Olympiad, Teesside 1974, Vienna Game, 0–1: the Frankenstein–Dracula Variation of the Vienna Game regularly provides swashbuckling play and Nunn's game with Jacob Øst-Hansen at Teesside 1974, was an example. The latter part of the game was played in a frantic time scramble, with Nunn sacrificing pieces to bring the enemy king into the open and deliver checkmate.
Beliavsky vs. Nunn, Hoogovens 1985

Position: g1 white rook, d1 white king, c1 white knight, a1 white rook, f2 white queen, c2 black knight, b2 white pawn, a2 white pawn, h3 white pawn, f3 white bishop, d3 black bishop, c4 black queen, d5 white pawn, c5 black pawn, h6 black bishop, g6 black pawn, d6 black pawn, e7 black pawn, b7 black pawn, a7 black pawn, g8 black king, f8 black rook

Final position
- Alexander Beliavsky vs John Nunn 1985, Wijk Aan Zee 1985, King's Indian, Samisch Variation, 0–1: this game is sometimes referred to as "Nunn's Immortal", and was included in the book The Mammoth Book Of The World's Greatest Chess Games (Robinson Publishing, 2010). In his book Winning Chess Brilliancies, Yasser Seirawan called this game the best of the 1980s.

== Books ==
- John Nunn's Chess Course (2014), Gambit Publications. ISBN 1-906454-82-5.
- 1001 Deadly Checkmates (2011), Gambit Publications. ISBN 1-906454-25-6.
- Understanding Chess Middlegames (2011), Gambit Publications. ISBN 1-906454-27-2.
- Nunn's Chess Endings, volume 1 (2010), Gambit Publications. ISBN 978-1-906454-21-0.
- Nunn's Chess Endings, volume 2 (2010), Gambit Publications. ISBN 978-1-906454-23-4.
- Understanding Chess Endgames (2009), Gambit Publications. ISBN 978-1-906454-11-1
- Grandmaster Chess Move by Move (2005), Gambit Publications. ISBN 1-904600-34-4.
- Learn Chess Tactics (2004), Gambit Publications. ISBN 1-901983-98-6.
- Mammoth Book of the World's Greatest Chess Games (2004, with Graham Burgess and John Emms), Carroll & Graf. ISBN 0-7867-1411-5.
- Endgame Challenge (2002), Gambit Publications. ISBN 1-901983-83-8.
- Understanding Chess Move by Move (2001), Gambit Publications. ISBN 1-901983-41-2.
- Secrets of Minor-Piece Endings (2001), Rowman Littlefield. ISBN 0-7134-7727-X.
- John Nunn's Best Games (2001), Batsford. ISBN 0-7134-7726-1.
- Learn Chess (2000), Gambit Publications. ISBN 1-901983-30-7.
- 101 Brilliant Chess Miniatures (2000), Gambit Publications. ISBN 1-901983-16-1.
- Nunn's Chess Openings (1999), with Joe Gallagher, John Emms, and Graham Burgess, Everyman Chess. ISBN 1-85744-221-0.
- John Nunn's Chess Puzzle Book (1999), Gambit Publications. ISBN 1-901983-08-0.
- Complete Najdorf: Modern Lines (1999), Sterling Pub Co Inc. ISBN 0-7134-8218-4.
- Secrets of Practical Chess (1998), Gambit Publications. ISBN 1-901983-01-3. Second edition 2007, ISBN 978-1-904600-70-1.
- The Complete Najdorf 6. Bg5 (1997), International Chess Enterprises. ISBN 1-879479-45-1.
- Secrets of Grandmaster Chess (1997), International Chess Enterprises. ISBN 1-879479-54-0.
- The King-Hunt (1996, with William Cozens), Batsford. ISBN 0-7134-7945-0.
- Beating the Sicilian 3 (1995, with Joe Gallagher), Henry Holt & Co. ISBN 0-8050-4227-X.
- Secrets of Pawnless Endings (1994, 2002), Gambit Publications. ISBN 1-901983-65-X.
- New Ideas in the Pirc Defence (1993), Batsford. ISBN 0-7134-7237-5.
- Secrets of Rook Endings (1992, 1999), Gambit Publications. ISBN 1-901983-18-8.
- The Complete Pirc (1989), Batsford. ISBN 0-7134-5389-3.
- Solving in Style (1985 Batsford) then (2002), Gambit Publications. ISBN 1-901983-66-8.
- The Benoni for the Tournament Player (1982), Batsford. ISBN 9780713435283.
- Tactical Chess Endings (1981), Batsford. ISBN 0-7134-5937-9.

== Personal life ==
Nunn is married to Petra Fink-Nunn, a German chess player with the title Woman FIDE Master. They have a son, Michael.

=== Astronomy ===
Coincident with a reduction in his over-the-board chess, Nunn has developed a passion for astronomy, a hobby he shares with ex-world chess champion Viswanathan Anand. Nunn has various articles and lectures published in Chessbase News.
