= Nigel Short =

English chess grandmaster (born 1965)

Nigel Short MBE
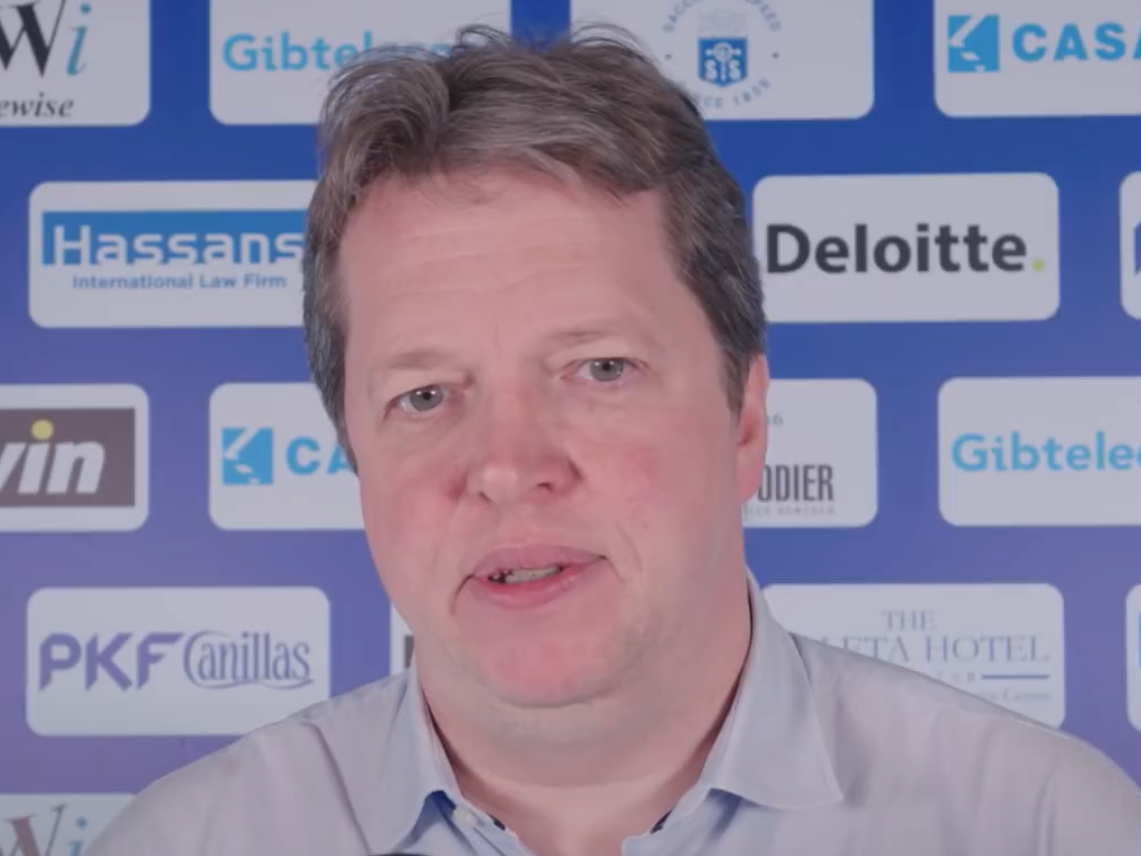
- Short in 2018

Personal information
- Born: Nigel David Short; 1 June 1965 (age 61) Leigh, Lancashire, England
- Spouse: Rhea Argyro Karageorgiou (m. 1987)

Chess career
- Country: England
- Title: Grandmaster (1984)
- FIDE rating: 2594 (October 2026)
- Peak rating: 2712 (April 2004)
- Peak ranking: No. 3 (July 1988)

Nigel David Short MBE (born 1 June 1965) is an English chess grandmaster, columnist, coach and commentator who has been the FIDE Director for Chess Development since September 2022. Short earned the title of grandmaster at the age of 19 and was ranked third in the world by FIDE from July 1988 to July 1989. In 1993, he became the first English player to play a World Chess Championship match, when he qualified to play Garry Kasparov in the PCA world championship in London, where Kasparov won 12½ to 7½.

He was appointed Member of the Order of the British Empire (MBE) in the 1999 Birthday Honours for services to chess.

== Early life, family, and education ==
Short was born 1 June 1965 in Leigh, Lancashire. He is the second of three children (all boys) of David and Jean Short. His father was a journalist and his mother was a school secretary. He grew up in Atherton, going to St Philip's Primary School on Bolton Old Road. He studied at the independent Bolton School and Leigh College.

Short began playing chess at the age of five after watching his father teach his older brother Martin. He was a member both of Atherton Chess Club, which was founded by his father, and later of Bolton Chess Club, which had initially rejected him (aged seven) for being too young. His parents divorced when he was 13 years old. Short left school at age 17, having completed four O-levels, to focus on chess full-time.

== Prodigy to Grandmaster ==
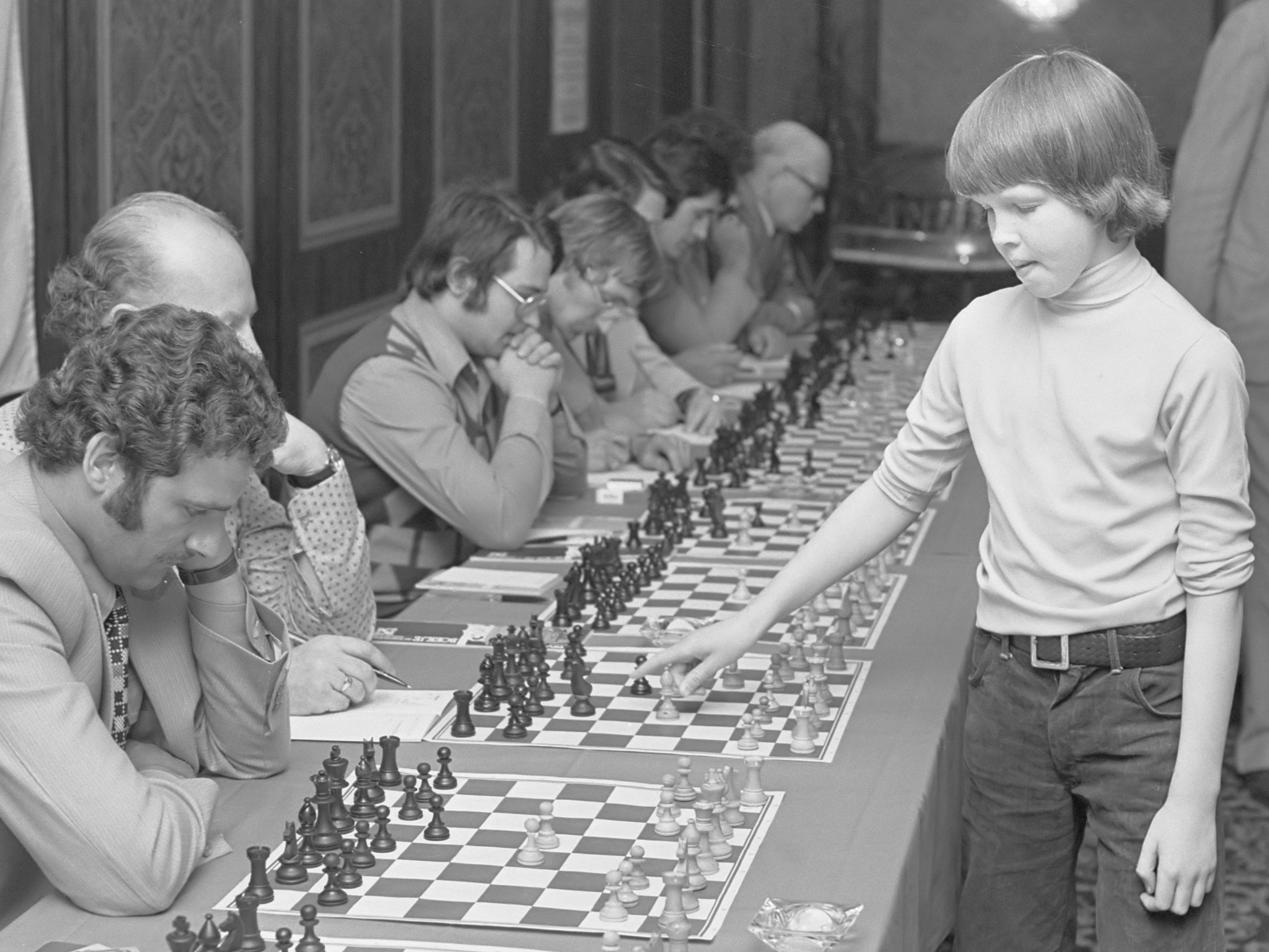
Nigel Short (1976)

Short learned chess at age five from his father. A chess prodigy, Short first attracted significant media attention as a 10-year-old by defeating Viktor Korchnoi, then ranked No. 2 in the world, in a simultaneous exhibition in London over 31 boards, where Short was the only victor. He was virtually self-taught. In 1977, he became the youngest-ever participant in the British Chess Championship by qualifying through the North West Zonal three days before his 12th birthday. In the event itself, he defeated ten-time British champion Jonathan Penrose, and finished with 5/11, an excellent showing for a debutant.

Short dominated British youth chess during this period, and earned a Master rating with his showing in the 1977 British finals. In 1978 he won his first adult national title when he won the British Lightning Championship aged 13 years 5 months 11 days, a title which he won again in 1980.

In 1979, in the British Championship at Chester, Short tied for first place with John Nunn and Robert Bellin, earning his first International Master norm; Bellin won the title on tiebreak. Later in 1979, Short tied for first place in the World Championship for players under age 16, the World Cadet Championship, at Belfort, France, but lost to Argentinian Marcello Tempone on tiebreak. He became (at the time) the youngest International Master in chess history by scoring 8/15 in the Hastings Premier in 1979/80, breaking Bobby Fischer's record from 1958.

Participating in four World Junior Championships (1980–1983), Short achieved his best result during his first attempt, when he placed second to Garry Kasparov in 1980 at Dortmund. Short represented England in international team play for the first time at the 1983 European Team finals in Plovdiv. He was awarded the grandmaster title in 1984, aged 19—becoming the youngest grandmaster in the world at the time, being later supplanted by Simen Agdestein.

== World Championship candidate ==
Short vs. Timman, final position

Position: c8 black bishop, e8 black rook, f8 black rook, g8 black king, c7 black pawn, d7 white rook, f7 black pawn, b6 black pawn, c6 black queen, e6 black pawn, f6 white queen, g6 black pawn, h6 white circle, a5 black pawn, e5 white pawn, g5 white king, h5 black pawn, a4 white pawn, c4 white pawn, d4 white rook, f4 white circle, h4 white pawn, f3 white knight, g3 white circle, c2 white pawn, f2 white pawn, g2 white pawn, h2 white circle, g1 white circle

Position after 34.Kg5. Short had marched his castled king up the board (see white circles), and now 35.Kh6 (if 34...Kh7, then 35.Qxg6+ Kh8 36.Qh6+ Kg8 37.Kf6) followed by Qg7# cannot be stopped.

Short's arrival on the World Chess Championship title began in earnest in 1985 when he narrowly qualified from the Biel Interzonal to become Britain's first-ever candidate. He needed a playoff to advance past John van der Wiel and Eugenio Torre for the last berth, after the three had tied in regulation play. But the Montpellier Candidates Tournament brought Short little success, as he scored 7/15 to finish in 10th place. In the next cycle, he again qualified by winning the 1987 Subotica Interzonal with Jon Speelman. The Candidates stage had by this time reverted to its traditional match format: Short defeated Gyula Sax (+2=3) in Saint John, Canada, in 1988, but then unexpectedly lost (−2=3) to Speelman in London.

Short's next attempt proved his most successful. He defeated Mikhail Gurevich in the last round of the Manila Interzonal and finished equal third with Viswanathan Anand, behind Vassily Ivanchuk and Boris Gelfand, qualifying him as a Candidate for the third successive time. Meeting Speelman again in the 8/Final, in London, he tied a close match (+2−2=4) before edging his older opponent 1.5–0.5 in the tie-break. The 1/4 final, against Gelfand, in Brussels, was a bloodthirsty affair in which Short eventually prevailed (+4−2=2). In the semifinal, in 1992, the Englishman overcame former World Champion Anatoly Karpov (+4−2=4) in a match that was described as "the end of an era". In the final, in San Lorenzo de El Escorial, Short defeated Dutchman Jan Timman (+5−3=5) to earn the right to meet defending World Champion Garry Kasparov. The King walk, perhaps the most famous in recent history, where Nigel Short defeated Jan Timman in Tilburg in 1991, was voted as one of the hundred greatest chess games in a list compiled by FM Graham Burgess, and GMs John Nunn and John Emms.

== World title match, London 1993 ==
According to Short and Kasparov, the head of the chess world's governing body FIDE, Florencio Campomanes, in breach of FIDE rules, decided the location of the match (Manchester) and the prize fund without consulting them. In her book Nigel Short: Quest for the Crown (Cadogan 1993), the British WIM and author Cathy Forbes wrote that at no time in the 1993 bidding process did FIDE actually receive a conforming world championship match bid. In response, Short and Kasparov promptly formed a rival organisation, the Professional Chess Association. The resulting match—sponsored by The Times newspaper—was held under the new body's auspices in London from September to October 1993. Kasparov won convincingly (+6−1=13) – the largest margin of victory in a world title contest since Botvinnik defeated Tal in 1961.

=== Controversy ===
The unprecedented rebellion organized by Kasparov and Short resulted in a parallel World Championship cycle organized by FIDE, featuring Anatoly Karpov and Jan Timman playing a title match later in 1993, which was won by Karpov. Short and Kasparov were both sanctioned by FIDE, and the situation led to enormous controversy and upheaval in the chess world for the next several years.

== Major tournament results ==
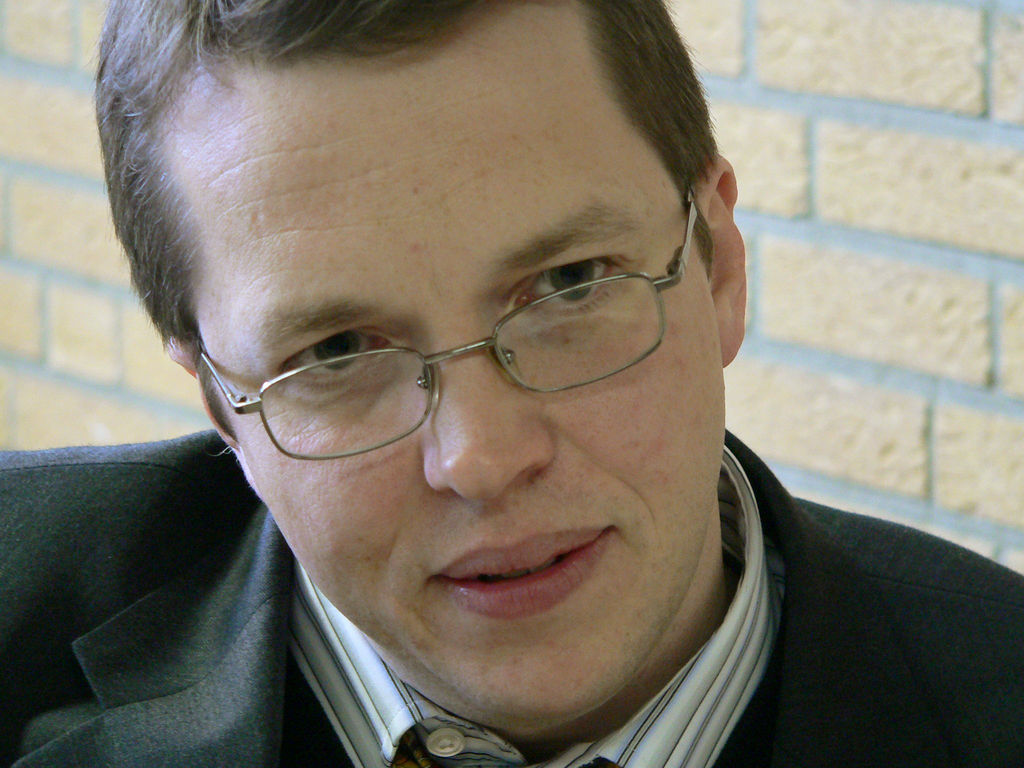
Short at the 2005 Corus chess tournament

Short won the British Chess Championship in 1984, 1987 and 1998, and the English Championship in 1991. He was the Commonwealth Champion in 2004 (Mumbai), 2006 (Mumbai) and 2008 (Nagpur). He won the 2006 EU Individual Open Chess Championship in Liverpool and took a share of second place in 2008 when it was held there again. He has finished outright first, or tied for first, in dozens of other international tournaments, including Geneva (1979), Belfort, World Under 16 (1979), the BBC Master Game (1981), Amsterdam OHRA (1982), Baku (1983), Esbjerg (1984), British Rapidplay Chess Championship (1986), Wijk aan Zee (1986, 1987), Reykjavík (1987), Amsterdam VSB (1988, 1991, 1992, 1993), Hastings (1987/88, 1988/89), Pärnu (1996), Groningen (1996), Tallinn/Pärnu (1998), Isle of Man Monarch Assurance 1998, Dhaka United Insurance (1999), Shymkent (1999), Pamplona (1999/2000), Linares Open (2000), Tan Chin Nam Cup, Beijing (2000), Feria del Orinoco (2001) Ciudad Bolivar, Sigeman and Co. Malmö (2002, 2009, 2013 joint first shared with Richárd Rapport and Nils Grandelius), Gibraltar (2003, 2004, 2012), Budapest Hunguest Hotels (2003), Samba Cup, Skanderborg (2003), Taiyuan (2004), the Politiken Cup (2006), Bazna (2008), the Staunton Memorial (2009), Bangkok Chess Club Open (2011, 2012, 2015, 2017), Luanda (2011), 7th Edmonton International (2012), Bunratty (2012, 2016, 2017, 2020), RA Club Ottawa (2012), Pühajärve Rapid Chess Tournament (2012), Spicenet Tanzania Open (2013), PokerStars Isle of Man (2014), Zaw Win Lay Memorial Yangon (2014), the South African Open (2015) the 1st Stars Cup in Anzali (2016), the British Knockout Championship (2016), the Bacolod Negros Open (2017), the Pre-League Blitz Open in Kampala (2018), the GM Nigel Short Blitz in Lagos (2018), the Moja GM Tournament, in Kimberley (2022), the Windhoek Open (2023), the Turkmenistan Federation Cup Open Blitz, in Ashgabat, Turkmenistan (2024). and the Grandmaster Blitz Challenge, in Bridgetown, Barbados (2025).

Short won the 50th edition of the Canadian Open Chess Championship in Ottawa in 2013, edging Canadian Grandmaster Eric Hansen on tiebreak after both finished with unbeaten 7½/9 scores.

Arguably Short's finest tournament performance came at the Amsterdam VSB tournament in 1991, where he tied for first place with Valery Salov ahead of both Kasparov and Karpov.

== Match results ==
In addition to World Championship cycle results already mentioned above, Short has enjoyed other success as a match player, beating US Champion Lev Alburt in Foxborough, Massachusetts in 1985 by the score of 7–1 (+6=2). He has also defeated Utut Adianto (+3=3) in Jakarta 1995, Étienne Bacrot in Albert 2000 (+3−1=2), Hannes Stefánsson in Reykjavík 2002 (+4−1=1), Ehsan Ghaem Maghami in Tehran 2003 (+2=4) Zahar Efimenko in Mukachevo 2009 (+2−1=3) and Hou Yifan in Hoogeveen 2016 (+2−1=3). Short lost to Joel Benjamin by 2½–1½ at London 1983, drew with Eugenio Torre (+1−1=4) in Manila 1988, drew with Timman (3–3) in an exhibition match at Hilversum in 1989, defeated Boris Gulko in extra games in the PCA Candidates' quarterfinals at New York 1994, lost to Gata Kamsky by (5½–1½) in the PCA semi-finals at Linares 1995, and drew with Anish Giri in Amsterdam 2010 (+1−1=2).

In a return to Tehran in March 2013, Short played a second match against the Iranian player Ehsan Ghaem Maghami. Billed as Talking Chess, the contest comprised four games with a classic time control, four games of rapid chess and eight games of blitz. As the classic games progressed, the players gave an intermittent live commentary, aimed at increasing the understanding of the live and television audiences, who could contrast and compare the player's own thoughts and assessments. Short won the classic games (+2=2), the rapid games (+3−1) and the blitz games (+3−2=3).

== International team record ==
Short made his international team debut in the European Team Chess Championship at age 17 at Plovdiv 1983. He represented England in 17 consecutive Olympiads between 1984 and 2016. Short's main highlights are: team silver medals in the chess Olympiads of Thessaloniki 1984, Dubai 1986 (where he also took gold medal for the best individual performance on board three) and Thessaloniki 1988. He took a team bronze in the Novi Sad Olympiad of 1990, and led England to fourth-place finishes in both 1994 and 1996. He led the English team to victory in the 1997 Euroteams at Pula, and was a member of the bronze winning team in 1992, and of fourth place teams in 1983 and 2001. He was a member of three English teams in the World Team Chess Championships of 1985 (team bronze), 1989 (team bronze), and 1997 (team fourth). His complete log when representing England in major international team events follows.

=== Olympiad ===
- Thessaloniki 1984 2nd reserve, 3/6 (+1−1=4) team silver
- Dubai 1986 board 3, 10/13 (+8−1=4), individual gold medal, team silver
- Thessaloniki 1988 board 1, 7/12 (+3−1=8), team silver
- Novi Sad 1990 board 1, 6/12 (+2−2=8) team bronze
- Manila 1992, board 1, 6/11 (+3−2=6)
- Moscow 1994, board 1, 8½/13 (+6−2=5)
- Yerevan 1996, board 1, 7/12 (+3−1=8)
- Elista 1998, board 2, 6½/11 (+2−0=9)
- Istanbul 2000, board 2, 7/12 (+3−1=8)
- Bled 2002, board 2, 8½/13 (+5−1=7)
- Calvià 2004, board 2, 1½/4 (+1−2=1)
- Turin 2006, board 2, 8/11 (+5−0=6)
- Dresden 2008, board 2, 7/10 (+6−2=2)
- Khanty-Mansiysk 2010, board 2, 4/8 (+2−2=4)
- Istanbul 2012, board 3, 7½/10 (+6−1=3)
- Tromsø 2014, board 3, 1½/5 (+1−3=1)
- Baku 2016, reserve, 6½/9 (+5−1=3)

European Team Championship:

- Plovdiv 1983 board 7, 4½/7 (+3−1=3)
- Debrecen 1992 board 1, 5½/8 (+4−1=3), individual bronze medal, team bronze
- Pula 1997 board 1, 4/7 (+2−1=4) team gold
- Batumi 1999 board 1, 5/8 (+3−1=4)
- León 2001 board 2, 6/9 (+3−0=6)
- Porto Carras 2011 board 2, 3/7 (+2−3=2)
- Warsaw 2013 board 3, 4½/7 (+2−0=5)
- Reykjavík 2015 board 4, 3/5 (+2−1=2)
- Hersonissos 2017 board 2, 3½/7 (+2−2=3)

World Team Championship:

- Lucerne 1985 board 4, 4/8 (+1−1=6) team bronze
- Lucerne 1989, board 1, 4½/8 (+3−2=3), individual silver medal, team bronze
- Lucerne 1997, board 1, 4/8 (+0−0=8)

World Senior Team Championship:

- Dresden 2015 board 1, 7/8 (+6−0=2) individual gold medal, team bronze
- Hersonissos 2017 board 1, 8/9 (+7−0=2) individual gold medal, team bronze

== Other activities ==
Short was appointed to serve as one of several Vice Presidents of the World Chess Federation (FIDE) in October 2018. He has written chess columns and book reviews for the British newspapers The Sunday Times, The Daily Telegraph, the Daily Mail and The Spectator. He wrote for The Sunday Telegraph for a decade and for The Guardian between 2005 and 19 October 2006. He reported on the FIDE World Chess Championship 2005 in San Luis, Argentina, for the ChessBase website. He wrote a column, "Short Stories", for New in Chess magazine from January 2011 until December 2018. During the World Chess Championship 2013 he wrote a series of articles for The Indian Express. In 2014, he began writing a column for the Financial Times, interviewing Sol Campbell in the first article.

He has individually coached young prodigies Pentala Harikrishna, Sergey Karjakin, David Howell and Parimarjan Negi. He worked as national coach of the Islamic Republic of Iran from 2006 to 2007. His first assignment led to their unexpectedly capturing a team bronze medal at the Asian Games in Doha, Qatar in 2006. In the nine chess events at the Asian Indoor Games in Macau 2007, Iran took a silver and two bronze medals.

Short was made an honorary Fellow of the then Bolton Institute of Higher Education in 1993, and was admitted to the honorary degree of Doctor of Science by the University of Bolton in 2010. In 1999, he was appointed MBE, in recognition of his chess accomplishments. In August 2005, he was unanimously elected secretary general of the Commonwealth Chess Association. He became its president in June 2006, stepping down in January 2008. He was the FIDE delegate for the ECF between 2009 and 2014.

During important chess events in recent years, Short is often engaged for commentary as part of live broadcasts on the Internet. Chess historian Edward Winter has named him one of the top five Internet broadcasters.

In the Introduction chapter of his book Winning, published in 2021, Short said "This is my first book, and it has taken a global pandemic for me to write it" and "I must confess that all books with my name on the cover – and with profound apologies to those who bought them – were all ghost-written".

An October 2021 blog post on Chess.com made the case that the anonymous grandmaster player "honestgirl" was, in fact, Nigel Short, based on their similar preferences for variations of the game, and based on the fact that "honestgirl" is an anagram of "Nigel Short".

== Incidents ==
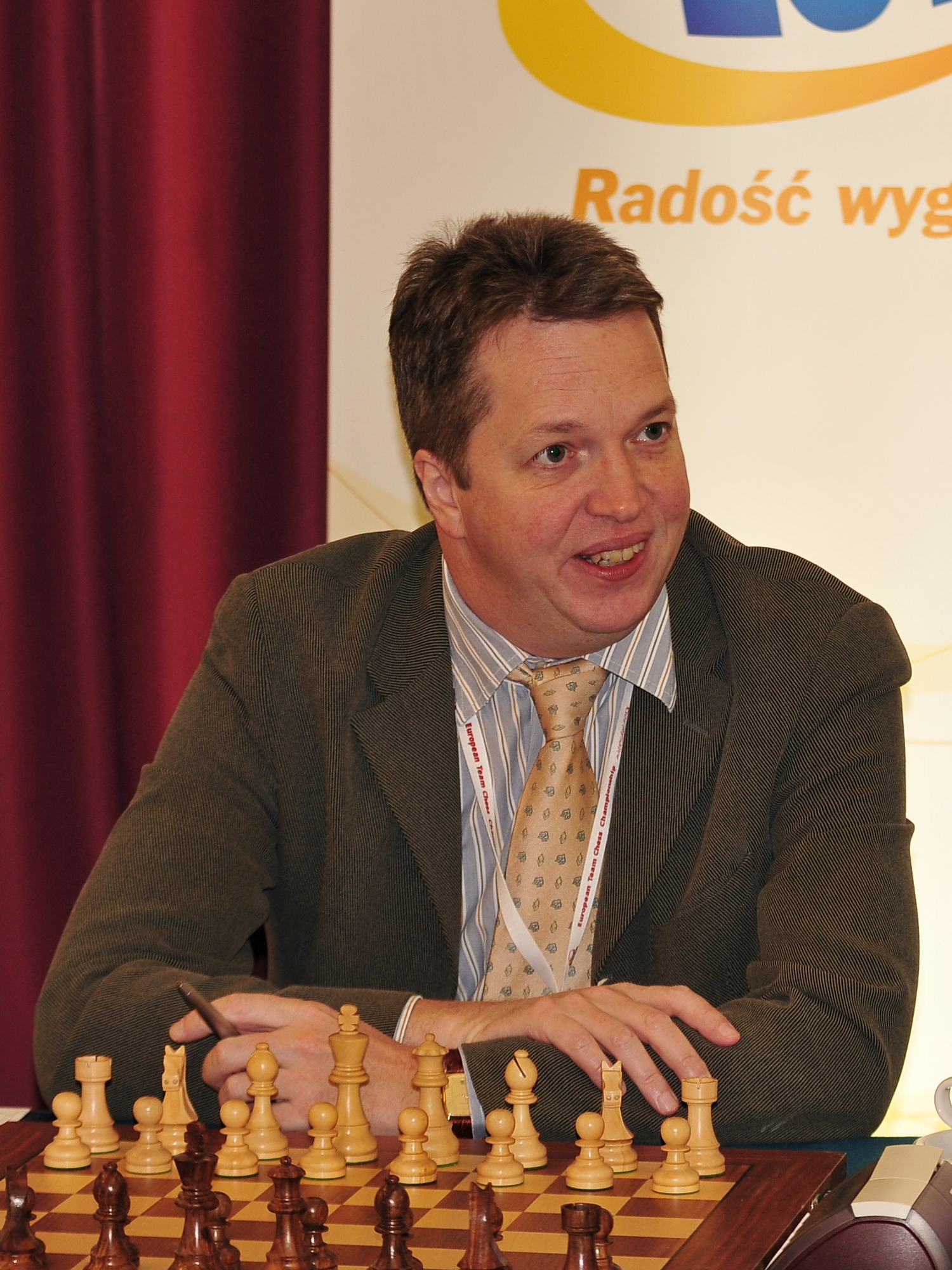
Short in 2013

In 2001, Short told The Sunday Telegraph chess column that he believed he had been secretly playing the reclusive former chess champion Bobby Fischer on the online chess platform Internet Chess Club in speed chess matches. Fischer denied ownership of the account.

In January 2007, Short gave an interview to the Indian newspaper DNA, in which he called for an inquiry to examine allegations that Veselin Topalov cheated during the World Championship in San Luis.

In the same DNA interview, Short was critical of the role of members of the Appeals Committee at the 2005 and 2006 World Championships, in particular FIDE Vice President Zurab Azmaiparashvili, whom he described as "singularly inappropriate for such work having, by his own admission, cheated in winning the 2003 European Championship". Azmaiparashvili filed a formal complaint to the FIDE Ethics Commission, which convened in July 2007. While dismissing the main complaints against Short, the commission sanctioned him for a minor violation of the FIDE Code of Ethics for his use of the word "dunderhead".

In 2015, Short said that men are biologically better at chess than women, and that women have other skills, citing his wife's superior emotional intelligence as an example. In response to widespread criticism for these comments, Short said, "it's quite easy to demonstrate there is a fairly substantial gap between men and women", dismissing his defeats by the world's strongest-ever female player, Judit Polgar, as "irrelevant".

In 2016, Short defeated the world's second-strongest ever female player, Hou Yifan, in a six-game match.

== Personal life ==
Short resides in Greece and married drama therapist Rhea Argyro Karageorgiou in 1987. The couple has two children.

Short loves wine and is an atheist. Politically, he is of the centre, and in the late 1980s was associated with the 'continuing' Social Democratic Party (SDP) led by David Owen, having been a member of that party's Council for Social Democracy from its inception in 1988. In 1992, he was one of twenty former members of the Owenite SDP who publicly endorsed the Conservative Party shortly before that year's general election.

== Publications ==
- Short, Nigel (1989). Nigel Short's Chess Skills. Hamlyn. ISBN 978-0-600-55743-2.
- Short, Nigel (1993). Chess Basics. Sterling Publishing. ISBN 0-8069-0798-3.
- Short, Nigel (2021). Winning. Quality Chess. ISBN 978-1-78483-159-2.

== See also ==
- List of chess grandmasters
