= Jon Speelman =

English chess grandmaster (born 1956)

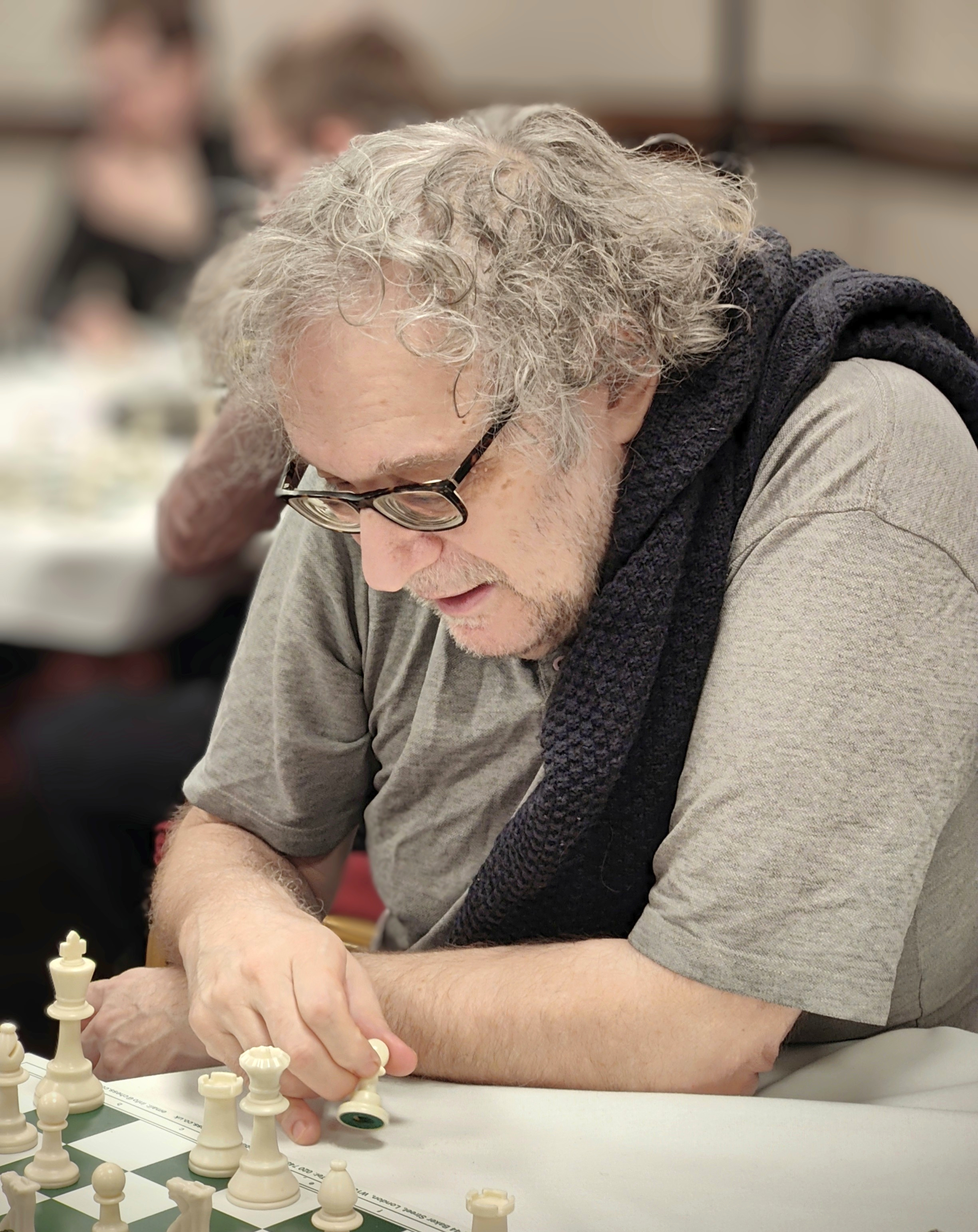
- Speelman in 2024

Personal information
- Born: Jonathan Simon Speelman; 2 October 1956 (age 70) London, England

Chess career
- Country: England
- Title: Grandmaster (1980)
- FIDE rating: 2495 (October 2026)
- Peak rating: 2645 (July 1988)
- Peak ranking: No. 5 (July 1988)

Jonathan Simon Speelman (born 2 October 1956) is an English chess grandmaster and author.

== Early life and education ==
Jonathan Simon Speelman was born on 2 October 1956 in Marylebone, London. He was educated at St Paul's School, London, and Worcester College, Oxford, where he read mathematics.

== Career ==
A winner of the British Chess Championship in 1978, 1985 and 1986, Speelman has been a regular member of the English team for the Chess Olympiad, an international biennial chess tournament organised by FIDE, the World Chess Federation.

He qualified for two Candidates Tournaments:

- In the 1989–1990 cycle, Speelman qualified by placing third in the 1987 interzonal tournament held in Subotica, Yugoslavia. After beating Yasser Seirawan in his first round 4–1, and Nigel Short in the second round 3½–1½, he lost to Jan Timman at the semi-final stage 4½–3½.
- In the following 1990–93 championship cycle, he lost 5½–4½ in the first round to Short, the eventual challenger for Garry Kasparov's crown.

In 1989, Speelman beat Kasparov in a televised speed tournament and then went on to win the event.

On 7 December 1990, Speelman was featured in an experimental interactive BBC Two broadcast called Your Move, which was hosted by Rob Curling and commentated by chess writer William Hartston. In the groundbreaking one-off episode, Speelman was pitted against the audience, who would use a special telephone line to submit their moves, with the move played by the viewers being decided by a democratic vote. Speelman won the match. The broadcast went for approximately three hours, about double the time that it had been scheduled for.

=== Writing ===
He has written a number of books on chess, including several on the endgame, among them Analysing the Endgame (1981), Endgame Preparation (1981) and Batsford Chess Endings (co-author, 1993).

Among his other books are Best Games 1970–1980 (1982), an analysis of nearly fifty of the best games by top players from that decade, and Jon Speelman's Best Games (1997). Today he is primarily a chess journalist and commentator, being the chess correspondent for The Observer and The Independent and sometimes providing commentary for games on the Internet Chess Club.

== Bibliography ==
(partial)

- Speelman, Jonathan (1981). Analysing the Endgame. Batsford (London, England). 142 pages. ISBN 978-0-7134-1909-2.
- Speelman, Jonathan (1981). Endgame Preparation. B.T. Batsford (London, England). 177 pages. ISBN 978-0-7134-4000-3.
- Speelman, Jon (1982). Best Chess Games, 1970–80. Allen & Unwin (London, England; Boston, Massachusetts). 328 pages. ISBN 978-0-04-794015-6.
- Speelman, Jonathan; Tisdall, Jon; Wade, Bob. (1993). Batsford Chess Endings. B.T. Batsford (London, England). 448 pages. ISBN 978-0-7134-4420-9.
- Speelman, Jon (1997). Jon Speelman's Best Games. B.T. Batsford (London, England). 240 pages. ISBN 978-0-7134-6477-1.
