= Morphy number =

Connection distance to Paul Morphy

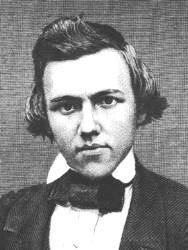
Paul Morphy

The Morphy number is a measure of how closely a chess player is connected to Paul Morphy (1837–1884) by way of playing chess games.

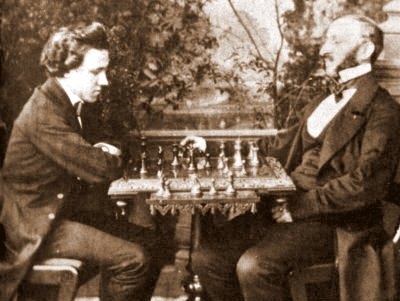
Morphy and Löwenthal

== Description ==
People who played a chess game with Morphy have a Morphy number of 1. Players who did not play Morphy but played someone with a Morphy number of 1 have a Morphy number of 2. People who played someone with a Morphy number of 2 have a Morphy number of 3, et cetera.

As of October 2019, there are very few known living players with Morphy number 3. Many ordinary players have a Morphy number of 6 or more.

The idea is similar to the Erdős number for mathematicians, the Bacon number for actors, and the Shusaku number, the equivalent for the board game of Go.

== Origin ==
Taylor Kingston states that the idea of the Morphy number may have originated in a June 2000 note by Tim Krabbé, who has Morphy number 4. Krabbé wrote "I once played an official game with Euwe, who played Tarrasch, who played Paulsen, who played Morphy."

== Morphy number of famous players ==
These are players who are important in making links for Morphy numbers.

=== Morphy number 1 ===
Morphy is known to have played about 100 people, but prior to 2010 all of the known links for players with Morphy number 2 went through just four players. A few years after the early lists of Morphy numbers tabulated, it was discovered that a fifth player, James Mortimer, was Morphy's friend and played casual games with him. This gives Mortimer a Morphy number of 1, creating a need to drastically revise those previous lists to include many more players. Mortimer had a very long, if not particularly successful, career, including the Ostende-B 1907 tournament, which enabled many famous younger players to gain a Morphy number of 2, including Mieses, Tartakower, Znosko-Borovsky, and Bernstein, who played beyond WW2, enabling still younger players to gain a Morphy number of 3, and so on.

- Adolf Anderssen
- Henry Bird
- James Mortimer
- John Owen
- Louis Paulsen
- Other opponents

=== Morphy number 2 ===
Everyone in this group played someone in the group above. The Australian champion Frederick Esling achieved MN2 by beating Anderssen in an offhand game and another Australian champion, Julius Leigh Jacobsen (1862–1916) achieved MN2 by beating Bird in a casual match +4-2=1, enabling many Australian players of the early 20th century to achieve MN3. The following are some of the most important players who have achieved MN2.

- Semyon Alapin
- Ossip Bernstein
- Joseph Blackburne
- Amos Burn
- Mikhail Chigorin
- Eugene Ernest Colman
- Oldřich Duras
- Frederick Esling
- Isidor Gunsberg
- David Janowski
- Emanuel Lasker
- S. Lipschütz
- George Mackenzie
- Frank Marshall
- James Mason
- Jacques Mieses
- Géza Maróczy
- Reginald Michell
- Aron Nimzowitsch
- Harry Pillsbury
- Akiba Rubinstein
- Carl Schlechter
- Edward Guthlac Sergeant
- Jackson Showalter
- Rudolf Spielmann
- Wilhelm Steinitz
- Siegbert Tarrasch
- Savielly Tartakower
- Richard Teichmann
- Sir George Thomas
- Szymon Winawer
- Eugene Znosko-Borovsky
- Johannes Zukertort

=== Morphy number 3 ===
Most of the masters in this group played several members of the previous group. This group includes some of the most important players for making connections to later generations. Botvinnik and Reshevsky played older masters such as Lasker and Janowski, had long careers, and played many younger players. Najdorf was Tartakower's pupil and they played a number of published games together, and Najdorf played blitz right into his 80s, allowing many younger players to achieve 4. Smyslov and Keres had very long careers, so much younger players achieved MN4 by playing them. Gligoric also played Tartakover, allowing many Yugoslav players to achieve 4. C.J.S. Purdy played Tartakower, enabling many Australian players to achieve 4. Fairhurst, who played Tartakover, was many times champion of Scotland, and later moved to New Zealand, so a number of players in these countries achieved 4 by playing him.

As of April 2026, living players with Morphy number 3 include Leonard Barden, Michael Fallone, Owen Hindle, Christian Langeweg, Oliver Penrose, and Jim Walsh.

- James Macrae Aitken
- Alexander Alekhine
- Conel Hugh O'Donel Alexander
- Leonard Barden
- Pal Benko
- Arthur Bisguier
- Efim Bogoljubow
- Fedor Bogatyrchuk
- Isaac Boleslavsky
- Mikhail Botvinnik
- David Bronstein
- Bernard Cafferty
- José Raúl Capablanca
- Martin Christoffel
- Arthur Dake
- Arnold Denker
- Jan Hein Donner
- Marcel Duchamp
- Erich Eliskases
- Max Euwe
- William Fairhurst
- Michael Fallone
- Reuben Fine
- Salo Flohr
- Svetozar Gligorić
- Owen Hindle
- Borislav Ivkov
- Paul Keres
- George Koltanowski
- Alexander Kotov
- Čeněk Kottnauer
- Franciscus Kuijpers
- Christian Langeweg
- Bent Larsen
- Edward Lasker
- Andor Lilienthal
- Aleksandar Matanović
- Vera Menchik
- Stuart Milner-Barry
- Vladimir Nabokov
- Miguel Najdorf
- Friðrik Ólafsson
- Frank Parr
- Jonathan Penrose
- Oliver Penrose
- Arturo Pomar
- Lodewijk Prins
- David Pritchard
- C.J.S. Purdy
- Samuel Reshevsky
- Stewart Reuben
- Friedrich Sämisch
- Vasily Smyslov
- Rudolf Spielmann
- Herman Steiner
- László Szabó
- Wolfgang Unzicker
- Milan Vidmar
- Robert Wade
- Jim Walsh
- Norman Whitaker
- Baruch Harold Wood

=== Morphy number 4 ===
As of 2013 many of these players are still alive; a few (such as Anand, Adams, Svidler and Ivanchuk) are still active.

- Michael Adams
- Viswanathan Anand
- Ulf Andersson
- Lev Aptekar
- Keith Arkell
- Yuri Averbakh
- Alexander Beliavsky
- Harold Bloom
- Walter Browne
- Donald Byrne
- Murray Chandler
- Maia Chiburdanidze
- Pia Cramling
- Nigel Davies
- Mark Dvoretsky
- Ben Finegold
- Bobby Fischer
- Semyon Furman
- Nona Gaprindashvili
- Paul Garbett
- Efim Geller
- Florin Gheorghiu
- Ewen Green
- Vlastimil Hort
- Robert Hübner
- Vassily Ivanchuk
- Gata Kamsky
- Anatoly Karpov
- Garry Kasparov
- Allen Kaufman
- Alexander Khalifman
- Ratmir Kholmov
- Viktor Korchnoi
- Gary Lane
- Ljubomir Ljubojević
- Sergio Mariotti
- Tony Miles
- Predrag Nikolić
- John Nunn
- Bruce Pandolfini
- Tigran Petrosian
- Judit Polgár
- Susan Polgar
- Ruslan Ponomariov
- Lajos Portisch
- Lev Polugaevsky
- Hans Ree
- Zoltán Ribli
- Ian Rogers
- Valery Salov
- Ortvin Sarapu
- Jonathan Sarfati
- Yasser Seirawan
- Alexei Shirov
- Nigel Short
- Vernon Small
- Boris Spassky
- Peter Svidler
- Richard John Sutton
- Mark Taimanov
- Mikhail Tal
- Jan Timman
- Veselin Topalov
- Anna Ushenina
- Rafael Vaganian
- Hikaru Nakamura
- John L. Watson

=== Morphy number 5 ===
As of 2013, many of the top grandmasters were thought to be in this group (along with a large number of lower-rated players). However, several players initially thought to be in this group were actually MN4s; for instance, based on playing Smyslov, who played Tartakower and Bernstein.

- Magnus Carlsen
- Fabiano Caruana
- Boris Gelfand
- Gukesh Dommaraju
- Mikhail Gurevich
- Igor Ivanov
- Rustam Kasimdzhanov
- Sergey Karjakin
- Vladimir Kramnik
- Joël Lautier
- Ding Liren
- Péter Lékó
- Shakriyar Mamedyarov
- Karsten Müller
- Ian Nepomniachtchi
- Levy Rozman
- Javokhir Sindarov
- Jon Speelman
- Artur Yusupov

== See also ==
- List of chess players
