= Robert W. Smith (chess player) =

New Zealand chess player (born 1956)

Robert Smith
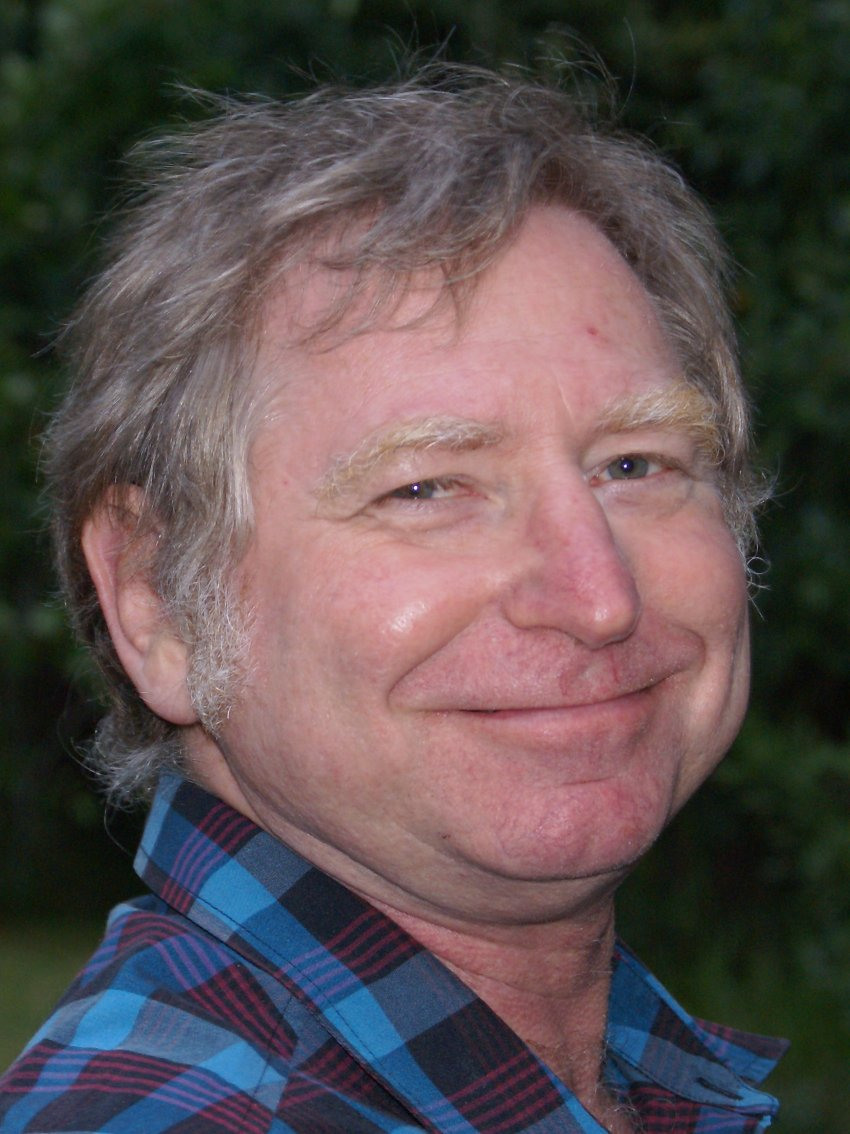
- Robert Smith, Tauranga, December 2012

Personal information
- Born: 15 March 1956 (age 70) Auckland, New Zealand

Chess career
- Country: New Zealand
- Title: FIDE Master (1996)
- Peak rating: 2333 (January 2008)

Robert Wayne Smith (born 15 March 1956, Auckland, New Zealand) is a chess player who holds the title of FIDE Master (FM).

== Chess career ==
Smith has represented New Zealand in twelve Chess Olympiads from 1976 to 2010. His best result was in 1982 when he scored 8.5/12, finishing in fifth place on the reserve board.

Smith jointly won the New Zealand Chess Championship with Russell Dive and Martin Dreyer in 1995/96. He won the New Zealand Correspondence Chess Championship in 1978, and jointly won the New Zealand Rapid Chess Championship in 1999/2000 and 2008.

Smith competed in seven Oceania Chess Championships between 2000 and 2012. His best result was in Fiji 2007, when he scored 6.5/9, earning an IM norm result, and finished equal second with Puchen Wang and Igor Goldenberg. Puchen Wang was awarded the IM title for his result, on tiebreak.

Smith is also a Life Member and former President of the New Zealand Chess Federation, and was awarded the FIDE titles of FIDE Trainer in 2005, and FIDE International Organizer in 2011.

== Personal life ==
Robert Smith has been married since 1984 to WFM Vivian Smith, also a competitive chess player, who has represented New Zealand at 15 chess olympiads and has received the New Zealand Order of Merit for her work with junior chess players. They have three children. Robert Smith previously worked as a freelance television news producer.

== Notable games ==
- Gary Lane vs Robert W Smith, Oceania Zonal Chess Championship, Fiji (2007), Sicilian Defence: Kan Variation, (B42), 0-1

1.e4 c5 2.Nf3 e6 3.d4 cxd4 4.Nxd4 a6 5.Bd3 Bc5 6.Nb3 Ba7 7.Nc3 Nc6 8.Qe2 d6 9.Be3 Nge7 10.f4 0-0 11.0-0 b5 12.Bxa7 Rxa7 13.a3 f6 14.Kh1 Ng6 15.Rad1 Qb6 16.Qh5 Nce7 17.Ne2 Rd8 18.Rf3 e5 19.f5 Nf8 20.c4 Rc7 21.Nd2 Kh8 22.Nc3 b4 23.Nd5 Nxd5 24.exd5 bxa3 25.bxa3 Bd7 26.Ne4 Be8 27.Qh4 Nd7 28.Rb1 Qd4 29.Rh3 Nf8 30.Be2 Ba4 31.Rd3 Qa7 32.Nxf6 Rb8 33.Rxb8 Qxb8 34.h3 Qd8 35.c5 Bb5 36.cxd6 Rc1+ 37.Rd1 Rxd1+ 38.Bxd1 Qxf6 39.Qe4 Qxd6 40.a4 Bd7 41.Be2 a5 42.Bf3 h6 43.g4 Nh7 44.Bg2 Nf6 45.Qc4 e4 0-1

- Stephen John Solomon vs Robert Wayne Smith, George Trundle NZ Masters (2007), Caro-Kann Defense: Advance Variation, (B12), 0-1
