= 1990 in chess =

Events in chess in 1990;

== Top players ==
FIDE top 10 by Elo rating - January 1990

1. Garry Kasparov Soviet Union 2800
2. Anatoly Karpov Soviet Union 2730
3. Jan Timman Netherlands 2680
4. Vassily Ivanchuk Soviet Union 2665
5. Mikhail Gurevich Soviet Union 2645
6. Valery Salov Soviet Union 2645
7. Alexander Beliavsky Soviet Union 2640
8. Nigel Short England 2635
9. Ulf Andersson Sweden 2630
10. Viktor Korchnoi Switzerland 2625

== Chess news in brief ==
- The Candidates' final is held in Kuala Lumpur. Anatoly Karpov defeats Jan Timman 6½-2½ to become Garry Kasparov's challenger once more. In a very close match for the World Chess Championship, held in Lyon, Kasparov has just too much for his long-standing rival and ends up retaining his title by a score of 12½-11½. He wins $1.7million in prize money.
- Sixty-four players compete at the Manila Interzonal. Boris Gelfand and Vassily Ivanchuk are joint winners with 9/13. Viswanathan Anand and Nigel Short score 8½/13 to finish with a share of third place.
- The Women's (Moscow) Interzonal is closely contested by co-winners Ketino Kachiani and Alisa Galliamova. Nona Gaprindashvili is victorious at the Women's (Malaysia) Interzonal.
- Gata Kamsky and Ivanchuk share success at a double round tournament in Tilburg, each scoring 8½/14.
- Kasparov wins the Linares chess tournament with 8/11. Gelfand takes second place with 7½/11.
- Yasser Seirawan triumphs at the Haninge tournament with 8½/11, ahead of Jan Ehlvest and Karpov (each with 7½/11).
- Alexander Beliavsky wins the OHRA tournament in Amsterdam.
- Karpov wins at Biel with 9½/14, ahead of Ulf Andersson (8/14) and Tony Miles (7½/14)
- John Nunn is the victor at Wijk aan Zee's annual Hoogovens tournament.
- Anand and Kamsky tie for first in a strong New Delhi tournament.
- Qualifiers from the GMA's Open tournament series come together in Moscow to contest the final. It is won jointly by Jon Speelman, Mikhail Gurevich, Alexander Khalifman, Zurab Azmaiparashvili and Evgeny Bareev.
- One hundred and seven teams take part at the Chess Olympiad, held at Novi Sad. The USSR win by a good margin, with 39/56. The USA and England share second place on 35½/56, with the USA taking silver medals on tie-break. The best individual rating performances come from Robert Hübner (gold), Murray Chandler (silver) and Vassily Ivanchuk (bronze). The Women's Olympiad is won by Hungary, on tie-break from the USSR (both 35/42), with China taking bronze on 29/42. The Polgar family are multiple medal winners, each sister taking gold for her respective board, along with a haul of team and performance rating medals. Ketevan Arakhamia earns a gold medal for her perfect 12/12 score as first reserve for the USSR.
- Charismatic Grandmaster Guillermo Garcia Gonzales of Cuba is killed in a car accident in Havana, while preparing to take part in the Olympiad.
- Kasparov wins a training match against Lev Psakhis +4, -0, =2 in Murcia, Spain.
- A 'Chess Summit', held in Reykjavík, comprises four teams of ten players. The USSR wins (31½/60) ahead of England (31/60), USA (30/60) and a combined 'Nordic countries' team (27½/60). England records its first ever match victory over the Soviet team with a 6-4 result.
- Beliavsky, Leonid Yudasin, Evgeny Bareev and Alexey Vyzmanavin tie for first place in the penultimate USSR Chess Championship, held in Leningrad (soon to be renamed Saint Petersburg). Beliavsky is awarded the title on tie-break.
- Lev Alburt wins the US Chess Championship in Jacksonville. Elena Donaldson takes the Women's Championship, held in Spartanburg, South Carolina.
- James Plaskett is the winner of the British Chess Championship, held at Eastbourne. Susan Arkell is the Women's Champion.
- Igor Glek wins the World Open in Philadelphia.
- Khalifman wins the New York Open and Bent Larsen takes the (Watson, Farley & Williams) New York International with 6½/9, ahead of Vasilios Kotronias (6/9).
- The US Masters in Chicago is won by Tony Miles.
- Karpov wins a game against Deep Thought at Harvard. The program, created by scientists at Carnegie-Mellon University, is remotely attached to an IBM Mainframe, enabling it to examine 750,000 positions per second.
- Seirawan defeats Timman 4-2 in the annual KRO Exhibition Match, held in Hilversum. This is one in a novel series of matches in which Timman is pitted against his contemporary grandmaster rivals.
- The World Youth Chess Championship for older children is held in Singapore. Sergei Tiviakov wins the Boys Under-18, while Konstantin Sakaev takes the Boys Under-16 trophy. Tea Lanchava of Georgia wins in the Girls Under-16 category.
- The World Youth Chess Festival for Peace caters for the younger children at Fond du Lac, Wisconsin. Although there are categories for girls, Hungarian child prodigy Judit Polgár enters and wins the Boys Under-14 section. This repeats her (Under-12) achievement at Timișoara in 1988. Boris Avrukh of the Soviet Union wins the Boys Under-12 category.
- England and the USSR tie for first place in the World Chess Solving Championship.
- FIDE declares that smoking is prohibited at all of its events.
- Shakhmatny Bulletin ceases publication.
- Variant Chess begins publication.

== Births ==
- Magnus Carlsen, Norwegian player, world top five Grandmaster while still a junior - November 30
- Sergey Karjakin, Ukrainian player, youngest Grandmaster ever and a World Youth Champion - January 12
- Ian Nepomniachtchi, Russian Grandmaster, World Youth Champion at U-14 - July 14
- Maxime Vachier-Lagrave, French Grandmaster and national champion - October 21
- Dmitry Andreikin, Russian Grandmaster and former World Junior Champion - February 5
- Yuriy Kuzubov, Ukrainian Grandmaster, one of the world's youngest to gain the title - January 26
- Anna Muzychuk, Grandmaster from Ukraine then Slovenia, World Youth Champion for Girls U-16 - February 28
- Nguyen Ngoc Truong Son, Vietnamese player, World Youth Champion at U-10 - February 23
- David Howell, England's youngest ever Grandmaster - November 14
- Sergei Matsenko, Russian Grandmaster - June 21
- Puchen Wang, New Zealand International Master - January 20
- Anya Corke, Hong Kong WGM, winner of three (Open section) British Junior titles - September 12

== Deaths ==
- Alexander Konstantinopolsky, Ukrainian honorary Grandmaster, Correspondence player and trainer - September 21
- Eero Böök, Finnish player, honorary Grandmaster and six-time national champion - January 7
- Guillermo Garcia Gonzales, Cuban Grandmaster, three-time national champion - October 26
- Ernest Klein, former British champion and author - ?
- Emil Josef Diemer - German player and openings theorist - October 10
- Geza Fuster, Hungarian-Canadian International Master - ?
- Ernest Pogosyants, Ukrainian chess problemist and endgame study specialist - August 16
- Baldur Honlinger, prominent Austrian player of the 1920s-1950s - March 12
- Heinrich Reinhardt, German-Austrian player - June 14
