= New Zealand Chess Championship =

The New Zealand Chess Championship is an annual open tournament played to determine the country's chess champion. It is organised by the New Zealand Chess Federation.

The first installment of the championship was held in Christchurch in 1879, and was won by Henry Hookham. Following a 9 year break, the tournament resumed in the New Year of 1888/89, and has been held annually since. It has been played with the Swiss system since 1996/97.

Note: Up until 1934 foreign players were eligible for the title. The eligibility rules were changed in 1935 to preclude this; John Angus Erskine (twice champion in 1929 and 1935) was born in Invercargill and was therefore eligible although he was domiciled in Melbourne, Australia.

== New Zealand Champions and Premier Reserve / New Zealand Major Open Champions ==
The 1920 Championship

	Location	Year	NZ Champion	City	Premier Reserve / NZ Major Open Champion	City
1	Christchurch	1879	Henry Hookham	Christchurch		
2	Christchurch	1888/89	Arthur Ollivier	Christchurch		
3	Dunedin	1890	Henry Hookham	Christchurch		
4	Wellington	1890/91	Richard James Barnes	Wellington		
5	Auckland	1891/92	Franz Vaughan Siedeberg	Dunedin		
6	Christchurch	1892/93	Franz Vaughan Siedeberg	Dunedin		
7	Dunedin	1893/94	Joseph Edwards	Wellington		
8	Wellington	1894/95	William MacKay	Wellington		
9	Wanganui	1895/96	William Meldrum	Rangitikei		
10	Christchurch	1896/97	Richard James Barnes	Wellington		
11	Auckland	1897/98	Richard James Barnes	Wellington		
12	Dunedin	1898	Robert Alexander Cleland	Dunedin		
13	Wellington	1900	William Edward Mason	Wellington		
14	Christchurch	1901	David Forsyth	Dunedin		
15	Auckland	1901/02	Richard James Barnes	Wellington		
16	Dunedin	1902/03	John Cresswell Grierson	Auckland		
17	Wellington	1903/04	William Edward Mason	Wellington		
18	Oamaru	1904/05	Arthur William Oswald Davies	Wellington		
19	Auckland	1905/06	Richard James Barnes	Wellington		
20	Christchurch	1906/07	William Samuel Viner	Perth		
21	Wellington	1908	Arthur William Oswald Davies	Wellington		
22	Dunedin	1908/09	Fedor Kuskof Kelling	Wellington		
23	Auckland	1909/10	John Mason	Wellington		
24	Timaru	1910/11	William Edward Mason	Wellington		
25	Napier	1911/12	William Edward Mason	Wellington		
26	Nelson	1912/13	John Cresswell Grierson	Auckland		
27	Auckland	1913/14	William Edward Mason	Wellington		
28	Christchurch	1914/15	Fedor Kuskof Kelling	Wellington		
29	Wellington	1919/20	William Edward Mason	Wellington		
30	Dunedin	1920/21	John Dunlop	Oamaru		
31	Auckland	1921/22	John Dunlop	Oamaru		
32	Christchurch	1922/23	John Dunlop	Oamaru		
33	Wellington	1923/24	Spencer Crakanthorp	Sydney		
34	Nelson	1924/25	Cecil Purdy	Sydney		
35	Dunedin	1925/26	Spencer Crakanthorp	Sydney		
36	Auckland	1926/27	Arthur William Oswald Davies	Auckland		
37	Christchurch	1927/28	Arthur William Oswald Davies	Auckland		
38	Wellington	1928/29	John Angus Erskine	Melbourne		
39	Wanganui	1929/30	Gunnar Gundersen	Melbourne		
40	Rotorua	1930/31	Alfred William Gyles	Wellington		
41	Napier	1931/32	Gunnar Gundersen	Melbourne		
42	Auckland	1932/33	Sydney			
43	Dunedin	1933/34	John Dunlop	Dunedin		
44	Christchurch	1934/35	John Angus Erskine	Invercargill		
45	Wellington	1935/36	Alfred William Gyles	Wellington		
46	Auckland	1936/37	Hedley Roy Abbott	Christchurch		
47	Dunedin	1937/38	Samuel Hindin	Christchurch		
48	Wanganui	1938/39	John Dunlop	Dunedin		
49	Wellington	1939/40	John Dunlop	Dunedin		
50	Timaru	1940/41	Philipp Allerhand	Wellington		
51	Wellington	1943/44	Robert Wade	Wellington		
52	Auckland	1944/45	Robert Wade	Wellington	N T Fletcher	
53	Christchurch	1945/46	Tom Lepviikman	Wellington	B S Wood	
54	Palmerston North	1946/47	Tom Lepviikman	Wellington	G E Trundle	
55	Dunedin	1947/48	Robert Wade	Wellington	N S Henderson	
56	Wanganui	1948/49	Alan Edgar Nield	Auckland	W E Moore	
57	Auckland	1949/50	Philipp Allerhand	Wellington	none	
58	Christchurch	1950/51	David I. Lynch	Hastings	V Lushcott	
59	Napier	1951/52	Ortvin Sarapu	Christchurch	T G Paterson	
60	Timaru	1952/53	Ortvin Sarapu	Auckland	N E H Fulton	
61	Wellington	1953/54	Ortvin Sarapu	Auckland	R F Cuthbert	
62	Auckland	1954/55	Ortvin Sarapu	Auckland	F A Foulds	
63	Dunedin	1955/56	Frederick Alexander Fould	Auckland	T Van Dijk	
64	Wellington	1956/57	Arcadios Feneridis; James Rodney Phillips	Wellington; Auckland	W Rainner	
65	Christchurch	1957/58	James Rodney Phillips	Auckland	B H P Marsick	
66	Hamilton	1958/59	Frederick Alexander Foulds; Barry C. Menzies	Auckland; Auckland	B Douglas	
67	Dunedin	1959/60	Ortvin Sarapu	Auckland	W B Petrie	
68	Auckland	1960/61	Ortvin Sarapu	Auckland	R A Court	
69	Wellington	1961/62	Graham G. Haase	Dunedin	D J Cooper	
70	Christchurch	1962/63	Ortvin Sarapu; Richard John Sutton	Auckland; Auckland	N M Cooper; B J Halpin	
71	Auckland	1963/64	Roger A. Court	Wellington	B E Howard	
72	Wellington	1964/65	James Rodney Phillips	Auckland	R T Metge	
73	Hamilton	1965/66	Ortvin Sarapu	Auckland	D J Cooper	
74	Christchurch	1966/67	Ortvin Sarapu	Auckland	L E Whitehouse	
75	Dunedin	1967/68	Bruce R. Anderson	Christchurch	G M Hall	
76	Wellington	1968/69	Bruce R. Anderson; Ortvin Sarapu	Christchurch; Auckland	B A Carpinter	
77	Auckland	1969/70	Ortvin Sarapu	Auckland	P M Daly	
78	Nelson	1970/71	Richard John Sutton	Auckland	C Laird; M G Whaley	
79	Hamilton	1971/72	Richard John Sutton	Auckland	R Craig	
80	Wellington	1972/73	Ortvin Sarapu	Auckland	P Hensman	
81	Christchurch	1973/74	Paul Anthony Garbett; Ortvin Sarapu	Auckland; Auckland	N Metge	
82	Dunedin	1974/75	Paul Anthony Garbett	Auckland	Philip O. Paris; Grant K. Russell	Otago; Wanganui
83	Upper Hutt	1975/76	Lev Aptekar; Murray Chandler; Ortvin Sarapu	Wellington; Wellington; Auckland	Robert W. Smith	Auckland
84	North Shore	1976/77	Ortvin Sarapu	Auckland	Philip A. Clemance; Peter B. Goffin	New Plymouth; Auckland
85	Wellington	1977/78	Craig Laird	Tauranga	David H. Beach	Wellington
86	North Shore	1978/79	Ortvin Sarapu	Auckland	Paul K. Beach; Peter Mataga; J. Nigel Metge	Auckland; Auckland; Auckland
87	Upper Hutt	1979/80	Ewen McGowen Green; Ortvin Sarapu; Vernon A. Small	Auckland; Auckland; Christchurch	Patrick L. Cordue; Peter Green	Wellington; Auckland
88	Lincoln	1980/81	Roger I. Nokes; Ortvin Sarapu; Vernon A. Small	Christchurch; Auckland; Christchurch	R.A. (Tony) Dowden	Dunedin
89	North Shore	1981/82	Vernon A. Small	Christchurch	Bernard Carpinter; David A. Gollogly	Napier; Auckland
90	Dunedin	1982/83	Paul Anthony Garbett; David A. Gollogly	Auckland; Auckland	Benjamin J. Alexander; Anthony F. Ker	Christchurch; Wellington
91	Auckland	1983/84	Paul Anthony Garbett	Auckland	Michael R. Freeman	Christchurch
92	Upper Hutt	1984/85	Vernon Small	Christchurch	Patrick L. Cordue; Mark Noble	Wellington; Wellington
93	Christchurch	1985/86	Adrian J. Lloyd; Ortvin Sarapu	Christchurch; Auckland	Peter McKenzie; Benjamin Martin	Christchurch; Dunedin
94	Wanganui	1986/87	Russell J. Dive	Wellington	Anthony F. Ker	Wellington
95	North Shore	1987/88	Jonathan Sarfati	Wellington	Leonard J. McLaren	Wellington
96	Dunedin	1988/89	Paul Anthony Garbett; Anthony F. Ker	Auckland; Wellington	Martin Dreyer (Reserve); Bruce Marsick (Major)	Auckland; Hamilton
97	Wellington	1989/90	Benjamin Martin; Ortvin Sarapu	Dunedin; Auckland	Kendall Boyd (Reserve); John Robinson (Major); Mark van der Hoorn (Major)	Dunedin; Auckland; Wellington
98	Auckland	1990/91	Anthony F. Ker	Wellington	John Robinson (Reserve); Matthew Barlow (Major)	Auckland; Auckland
99	Dunedin	1991/92	Martin P. Dreyer	Auckland	Charles Ker (Reserve); Simon Grainger (Major)	Wellington; Wellington
100	Wellington	1992/93	Anthony Ker	Wellington	Philip Abrahamson (Reserve); Charles Ker (Reserve); Prince Vetharaniam (Major); Mark van der Hoorn (Major)	Christchurch; Wellington; Wanganui; Wellington
101	Invercargill	1993/94	Anthony Ker; Peter D. McKenzie	Wellington; Christchurch	Mark Sinclair (Reserve); Matthew Edmonds (Major)	Wellington; Christchurch
102	Wanganui	1994/95	Anthony F. Ker	Wellington	Paul Tuffery (Reserve); Benjamin Giles (Major); Kent Wong (Major)	New Plymouth; Maruia; Wellington
103	Wellington	1995/96	Russell J. Dive; Martin Dreyer; Robert W. Smith	Wellington; Auckland; Auckland	J. Nigel Metge (Reserve); Russell Metge (Major)	Auckland; Auckland
104	North Shore	1996/97	Aleksei Kulashko	Auckland	Tim G. Hare	Auckland
105	Hamilton	1997/98	Aleksei Kulashko	Auckland	Chris J. Burns	Wanganui
106	Dunedin	1998/99	Russell J. Dive	Wellington	Matthew McNabb	Auckland
107	Auckland	1999/00	Aleksei Kulashko	Auckland	Paul K. Beach	Auckland
108	Waitakere City	2000/01	Scott Wastney	Nelson	Benjamin Giles	Maruia
109	Christchurch	2001/02	Anthony F. Ker	Wellington	Barry Martin-Buss	Auckland
110	Wanganui	2002/03	Anthony F. Ker	Wellington	John McDonald	Wellington
111	Wellington	2003/04	Anthony F. Ker	Wellington	Brendan Reedy	Wellington
112	Wanganui	2004/05	Anthony F. Ker	Wellington	William (Bill) Forster	Wellington
113	Queenstown	2006	Murray Chandler	Queenstown & London	Maciej Wojnar	Wellington
114	Wanganui	2007	Puchen Wang	Auckland	Neil Gunn	Auckland
115	Auckland	2008	Murray Chandler	Auckland	Daniel Shen	Auckland
116	Queenstown	2009	Anthony F. Ker	Wellington	Gavin Marner	Wellington
117	Auckland	2010	Anthony F. Ker	Wellington	Alan Ansell	New Plymouth
118	Auckland	2011	Anthony F. Ker	Wellington	Roy Seabrook	Auckland
119	Queenstown	2012	Michael V.R. Steadman	Auckland	Nathan Goodhue	Auckland
120	Wellington	2013	Scott Wastney	Wellington	Max Chew Lee	Australia
121	Auckland	2014	Puchen Wang	Auckland	Paul Macdonald; Sean Martin-Buss	Auckland; Auckland
122	Auckland	2015	Russell J. Dive; Nicolas Croad; Ben Hague; Paul A Garbett; Anthony F. Ker; Gino Thornton; Robert W. Smith; Leonard J McLaren; Alexandra Jule; Gordon Morrell	Wellington; Wellington; Auckland; Auckland; Wellington; Auckland; Mount Maunganui; Auckland; Australia; Auckland	Antonio Krstev; Helen Milligan	Auckland; Auckland
123	Auckland	2016	Aleksei Kulashko; Michael V.R. Steadman	Auckland; Auckland	Fuatai Fuatai; Vinod Kumar	Auckland; Auckland
124	Wellington	2017	Scott Wastney	Wellington	William (Bill) Forster; Yogesh Kulkarni	Wellington; Wellington
125	Palmerston North	2018	Russell J. Dive; Alphaeus Ang	Wellington; Auckland	Stanley Yee	Auckland
126	Auckland	2019	Anthony F. Ker; Russell J. Dive	Wellington	Robert E. Gibbons	Auckland
127	Tauranga	2020	Kirill Polishchuk; Ben Hague; Paul Anthony Garbett; Russell J Dive	Mount Maunganui; Auckland; Auckland; Wellington	Hao Tang	Auckland
128	Palmerston North	2021	Nicolas Croad	Wellington	Clinton A. Wells	Auckland
129	Christchurch	2022	Daniel Hanwen Gong	Auckland	Euan McDougall	Auckland
130	Wellington	2023	Daniel Hanwen Gong	Auckland	Kayden Loke	Wellington
131	Palmerston North	2024	Nicolas Croad	Wellington	Dion Wilson	Hawkes Bay
132	Auckland	2025	Felix Xie	Auckland	Alexander Hanrui Pan; Ceferino Isaac	Auckland
133	Invercargill	2026	Felix Xie	Auckland	Elena Moshakova	Auckland

== Championship Multiple Winners ==
Number	Name
20	Ortvin Sarapu
14	Anthony F Ker
7	Paul F Garbett, Russell J Dive
6	John Dunlop, William Edward Mason
5	Richard James Barnes
4	Arthur William Oswald Davies, Vernon Small, Aleksei Kulashko
3	Robert Wade, Rodney Phillips, Richard J Sutton, Murray Chandler, Scott Wastney, Nicolas Croad
2	Henry Hookham, Franz Siedebeg, John Grierson, Fedor Kelling, Spencer Crakanthorp, John Erskine, Gunnar Gundersen, Alfred Gyles, Philipp Allerhand, Tom Lepviikman, Frederik Foulds, Bruce Anderson, Martin Dreyer, Puchen Wang, Robert W Smith; Michael V.R. Steadman, Ben Hague, Daniel Hanwen Gong , Felix Xie

== New Zealand Rapid Champions ==
The New Zealand Rapid Chess Championship was first conducted in 1993.

The event is organised by the New Zealand Chess Federation.

	Location	Year	Champion	City
1	Wellington	1993	Russell Dive	Wellington
2	Invercargill	1994	R.A. (Tony) Dowden	Dunedin
3	Wanganui	1995	Kendall Boyd; Martin Dreyer; Mark Noble	Dunedin; Auckland; Wellington
4	Wellington	1996	Russell Dive	Wellington
5	North Shore	1997	Russell Dive	Auckland
6	Hamilton	1998	Aleksei Kulashko	Auckland
7	Dunedin	1999	Anthony Ker	Wellington
8	Auckland	2000	Matthew Barlow; Russell Dive; Robert W. Smith; John L. Sutherland	Auckland; Wellington; Auckland; Dunedin
9	Waitakere City	2001	Murray Chandler	London
10	Christchurch	2002	Russell Dive	Wellington
11	Wanganui	2003	Russell Dive	Wellington
12	Wellington	2004	Paul Garbett; Stephen Lukey	Auckland; Wellington
13	Wanganui	2005	Russell Dive	Wellington
14	Queenstown	2006	Puchen Wang	Auckland
15	Wanganui	2007	Puchen Wang	Auckland
16	Auckland	2008	Robert W. Smith; Michael Steadman	Auckland; Auckland
17	Queenstown	2009	Anthony Ker	Wellington
18	Auckland	2010	Nicolas Croad	Wellington
19	Auckland	2011	Anthony Ker	Wellington
20	Auckland	2012	Ben Hague; Bruce Watson	Wanganui; Auckland
21	Wellington	2013	Paul Garbett; Anthony Ker	Auckland; Wellington
22	Auckland	2014	Puchen Wang	Auckland
23	Auckland	2015	Russell Dive; Hans Gao	Wellington; Auckland
24	Auckland	2016	Paul Garbett; Mark Noble; Robert Smith; Puchen Wang	Auckland; Palmerston North; Mount Maunganui; Auckland
25	Wellington	2017	Hans Gao; Anthony Ker	Auckland; Wellington
26	Palmerston North	2018	Michael Steadman	Auckland
27	Auckland	2019	Ralph Hart	Auckland
28	Tauranga	2020	Anthony Ker	Wellington
29	Auckland	2021	Felix Xie	Auckland
30	Christchurch	2022	Russell Dive	Wellington
31	Wellington	2023	Nicolas Croad; Felix Xie; Anthony Ker	Wellington; Auckland; Wellington
32	Palmerston North	2024	Russell Dive	Wellington
33	Auckland	2025	Alphaeus Wei Ern Ang; Russell Dive; Daqi Mao	Auckland; Wellington; Auckland
34	Invercargill	2026	Felix Xie	Auckland

== Rapid Championship Multiple Winners ==
Number	Name
11	Russell J. Dive
7	Anthony F. Ker
4	Puchen Wang
3	Robert W. Smith, Paul Garbett, Felix Xie
2	Mark Noble, Hans Gao, Michael Steadman, Nicolas Croad

== Championship Double Winners ==
Year	Name
1995/96	Russell J. Dive
1997/98	Aleksei Kulashko
2007	Puchen Wang
2009	Anthony F. Ker
2011	Anthony F. Ker
2014	Puchen Wang
2015	Russell J. Dive
2026	Felix Xie

== Women's Championship Winners ==
The New Zealand Women's Championship is played for the Mabel Abbott Trophy, named for the winner of the inaugural event in 1938.

The 2023 edition was held as a memorial event for 2006 winner WIM Sue Maroroa Jones, who died earlier in the year.

Year	Name
1938	M E Abbott
1940	E L Short
1967	M McGrath
1978	F Foster; W Stretch
1980	F Foster
1981	J Sievey
1982	V Burndred
1983	K Metge
1985	J Sievey
1991	R Foster
1992-93	V Smith; F Foster
1994	V Smith
1995	V Smith
1996	W Ong
1997	R L Sheehan
1998	Vivian Smith
1999	Vivian Smith
2000	Vivian Smith
2001	E Mikhailik
2002	Edith Otene; Vivian Smith
2003	Vivian Smith
2004	Vivian Smith
2005	E Charomova
2006	Sue Maroroa
2007	Shirley Wu; Judy Gao
2008	Natasha Fairley; Judy Gao; Helen Milligan
2009	Judy Gao
2010	Shirley Wu
2022	Vyanla M Punsalan
2023	Isabelle Yixuan Ning
2025	Wanyao Sarah Sun
2026	Sophia Feng; Elena Moshakova

== North Island Champions ==
The North Island Chess Championship was first conducted in 1954. Players compete for the Charles Belton Trophy. The event is organised by the New Zealand Chess Federation.

	Location	Year	Champion
1		1954	Charles P. Belton
2		1955	F.A. Haight
3		1956	Bruce H.P. Marsick; Roger A. Court; David I. Lynch
4	Dannevirke	1957	Charles P. Belton
5		1958	James Rodney Phillips; Ortvin Sarapu
6	Palmerston North	1959	James Rodney Phillips
7		1960	James Rodney Phillips
8	Wanganui	1961	Roger Chapman
9		1962	David I. Lynch
10	Rotorua	1963	Roger A. Court
11		1964	R.S. Wilkin
12		1965	Ortvin Sarapu
13	New Plymouth	1966	Richard J. Sutton
14		1967	David J. Cooper
15		1968	A. R. Day
16	Wanganui	1969	Christopher A. Evans
17	Rotorua	1970	Paul Garbett
18		1971	Richard J. Sutton
19		1972	Ortvin Sarapu
20	Hamilton	1973	Paul Garbett
21		1974	Robert C. Wansink
22	Hamilton	1975	Murray Chandler; Ewen Green
23		1976	Paul Garbett
24	Wainuiomata	1977	Lindsay H. Cornford
25		1978	Lev Aptekar; Peter R. Green
26		1979	Paul Garbett
27	Tauranga	1980	Mark Levene; Ortvin Sarapu
28	New Plymouth	1981	Paul Garbett
29	Wanganui	1982	P. A. Kelly; Mark Leveve; Robert W. Smith
30	Hamilton	1983	Jonathan Sarfati
31	Wanganui	1984	Robert W. Smith
32	Napier	1985	Jonathan Sarfati
33	New Plymouth	1986	Peter R. Green; Jonathan Sarfati; Ortvin Sarapu; J. Nigel Metge; Peter W. Stuart; Gregory J. Aldridge
34		1987	Anthony F. Ker
35	Wanganui	1988	Anthony F. Ker; Peter W. Stuart
36	Wellington	1989	Anthony F. Ker; Charles Ker; Isidor Reyn; Jonathan Sarfati; Robert W. Smith
37		1990	Martin P. Dreyer
38	New Plymouth	1991	Anthony F. Ker
39		1992	Russell J. Dive
40		1993	Robert W. Smith; Mark Noble
41		1994	Robert W. Smith
42		1995	Robert W. Smith; Anthony F. Ker
43		1996	Mark Sinclair; Ferenc Fabri
44		1997	Anthony F. Ker
45		1998	Russell J. Dive
46		1999	Robert W. Smith; Nigel Hopewell
47		2000	Anthony F. Ker
48		2001	Bruce Watson
49		2002	Daniel Han; Mark van der Hoorn
50		2003	Jesse Wilson
51		2004	Paul Garbett; Leonard McLaren
52		2005	Puchen Wang
53		2006	Scott Wastney
54	Auckland	2007	Don Eade; Leonard McLaren
55	Tauranga	2008	Anthony F. Ker
56	Wellington	2009	Russell J. Dive
57	Auckland	2010	Robert W. Smith
58	Wellington	2011	Robert W. Smith
59	Auckland	2012	Luke Li
60	Wellington	2013	Russell J. Dive
61	Auckland	2014	Leonard McLaren
62	Palmerston North	2015	Mark Noble
63	Palmerston North	2016	Mark Noble; Jack James
64	Auckland	2017	Alphaeus Ang
65	Palmerston North	2018	Michael V.R. Steadman
65	Wellington	2019	Michael V.R. Steadman
66	Wellington	2021	Felix Xie; Athula Russell
67	Auckland	2022	Alphaeus Ang
68	Auckland	2023	Alphaeus Ang
69	Wellington	2024	Anthony F. Ker
70	New Plymouth	2025	Alphaeus Ang
71	Auckland	2026	Alphaeus Ang; Daqi Mao; Nadia Braganza

== North Island Championship Multiple Winners ==
Number	Name
9	Robert Smith, Anthony F Ker
6	Paul Garbett
5	Ortvin Sarapu, Alphaeus Ang
4	Jonathan Sarfati, Russell Dive
3	Rodney Phillips, Mark Noble, Leonard McLaren
2	Charles Belton, Roger Court, David Lynch, Richard Sutton, Peter Green, Mark Levene, Peter Stuart, Michael Steadman

== South Island Champions ==
The South Island Chess Championship was first conducted in 1950. The event is organised by the New Zealand Chess Federation.

	Location	Year	Champion
1	Christchurch	1950	J. F. Lang
2	Dunedin	1951	Ortvin Sarapu
3	Timaru	1952	R. A. Rasa
4	Christchurch	1953	L. Esterman
5	Dunedin	1954	J. F. Lang; J. R. Cusack
6	Christchurch	1955	R. A. Rasa
7	?	1956	R. A. Rasa
8	Oamaru	1957	R. Watt; K. Steele
9	Invercargill	1958	Tom van Dijk
10	Dunedin	1959	Tom van Dijk
11	Christchurch	1960	Ortvin Sarapu
12	Dunedin	1961	Graham G. Haase
13	Invercargill	1962	L. Esterman
14	Cromwell	1963	R. A. Rasa
15	Ashburton	1964	Bruce R. Anderson; I. D. Hayes
16	Dunedin	1965	Bruce R. Anderson
17	Christchurch	1966	Bruce R. Anderson; A. L. Wilkinson; L. Esterman
18	Dunedin	1967	G. Kerr
19	Invercargill	1968	Bruce R. Anderson
20	Ashburton	1969	Bruce R. Anderson
21	Christchurch	1970	Bruce R. Anderson
22	Dunedin	1971	Bernard A. Carpinter; G. Kerr
23	?	1972	G. Hall; A. Wilkinson
24	Nelson	1973	John R. Jackson
25	Dunedin	1974	William Lynn
26	Christchurch	1975	Vernon A. Small
27	Nelson	1976	Roger I. Nokes
28	Dunedin	1977	Bruce R. Anderson; Roger. L Perry; Lindsay H. Cornford
33	Dunedin	1982	Vernon A Small
34	Nelson	1983	Adrian J. Lloyd; Vernon A. Small
35	Christchurch	1984	Adrian J. Lloyd; Vernon A. Small; M. C. Wilson
36	Dunedin	1985	Robert C. Wansink
37	Nelson	1986	John R. Jackson
38	Christchurch	1987	Benjamin M. S. Martin
39	Invercargill	1988	Benjamin M. S. Martin
40	Ashburton	1989	Richard John Sutton
41	Dunedin	1990	Benjamin M. S. Martin
42	Nelson	1991	Benjamin M. S. Martin
43	Invercargill	1992	Stephen G. Lukey
44	Ashburton	1993	Stephen G. Lukey
45	Christchurch	1994	Stephen G. Lukey
46	Dunedin	1995	Stephen R. Coates
47	Blenheim	1996	R. A. (Tony) Dowden
48	Christchurch	1997	B. Santosa
49	Ashburton	1998	David W. Guthrie
50	Blenheim	1999	Bruce I. Donaldson; Arie J. Nijman
51	Dunedin	2000	Ben J. Giles
52	Dunedin	2001	Scott C. Wastney
53	Christchurch	2002	R. A. (Tony) Dowden
54	Ashburton	2003	Alistair A. Compton
55	Dunedin	2004	Richard John Sutton
56	Christchurch	2005	Andy Machdoem
57	Ashburton	2006	Quentin J. F. Johnson; Bruce I. Donaldson
58	Nelson	2007	Quentin J. F. Johnson; John P. van Ginkel
59	Kaikoura	2008	Roger I. Nokes
60	Duendin	2009	Peter Fraemohs
61	Ashburton	2010	Hamish Gold; John P. van Ginkel; Arie J. Nijman; Andy Machdoem
62	Christchurch	2011	Stephen G. Lukey
63	Dunedin	2012	Robert C. Wansink; Stephen G. Lukey
64	Nelson	2013	Quentin J. F. Johnson
65	Ashburton	2014	Stephen G. Lukey
66	Christchurch	2015	Edward Rains
67	Christchurch	2016	Stephen G. Lukey
68	Dunedin	2017	Stephen G. Lukey
69	Christchurch	2018	Stephen G. Lukey
70	Hanmer Springs	2019	Edward Lee; Matthew McNabb
71	Dunedin	2020	Matthew McNabb
72	Christchurch	2021	Stephen G. Lukey; Nick Cummings
73	Invercargill	2022	Romero Suggate; Matthew McNabb; Nick Cummings
74	Oamaru	2023	Edward Lee
75	Christchurch	2024	Roger I. Nokes
76	Dunedin	2025	Edward Rains
77	Nelson	2026	Michael V.R. Steadman; John Stark

== South Island Championship Multiple Winners ==
Number	Name
11	Stephen Lukey
9	Robert Anderson
5	Vernon Small
4	R A Rasa, Benjamin Martin
3	L Esterman, Adrian Lloyd, Quentin Johnson, Matthew McNabb, Roger Nokes
2	J F Lang, Ortvin Sarapu, Tom Van Dijk, A Wilkinson, Grant Kerr, Jon Jackson, Robert Wansink, Richard Sutton, Tony Dowden, Arie Nijman, Andy Machdoem, John van Ginkel, Nick Cummings, Edward Lee, Edward Rains

== New Zealand Correspondence Champions ==
Winners of the New Zealand correspondence chess Championship (start year given):

- 1933 R.O. Scott
- 1934 ---
- 1935 E.F. Tibbetts
- 1936 J.T. Burton
- 1937 S. Hindin
- 1938 S. Hindin
- 1939 S. Hindin
- 1940 G.C. Cole
- 1941 J.A. Cunningham
- 1942 G.C. Cole
- 1943 G.C. Cole
- 1944 F.H. Grant, T. Lepviikman, N.M. Cromarty
- 1945 C.J. Taylor
- 1946 R.W. Lungley
- 1947 D.I. Lynch
- 1948 D.I. Lynch
- 1949 N.M. Cromarty
- 1950 N.M. Cromarty
- 1951 H.G. King, J.A. Cunningham
- 1952 H.P. Whitlock
- 1953 R.W. Park
- 1954 J.A. Cunningham
- 1955 E.J. Byrne
- 1956 A.E. Turner
- 1957 D.I. Lynch
- 1958 R.A. Court, L. Esterman
- 1959 R.A. Court, J. Eriksen, J.A. Cunningham
- 1960 J.A. Cunningham
- 1961 F.A. Foulds
- 1962 R.A. Court
- 1963 J. Eriksen
- 1964 F.A. Foulds
- 1965 Ortvin Sarapu
- 1966 R.S. Wilkin, R.A. Court
- 1967 J.H. Patchett
- 1968 Ortvin Sarapu
- 1969 Ortvin Sarapu
- 1970 Richard John Sutton
- 1971 Paul Anthony Garbett
- 1972 K.W. Lynn
- 1973 D.A. Flude
- 1974 T. van Dijk
- 1975 L.J. Jones
- 1976 P.A. Clemance
- 1977 L.J. Jones
- 1978 R.W. Smith
- 1979 M.R. Freeman
- 1980 R. Chapman
- 1981 R. Chapman
- 1982 Paul Anthony Garbett, T. van Dijk
- 1983(50)M.R. Freeman
- 1984 M.R. Heasman
- 1985 P. van Dijk
- 1986 G.M. Turner
- 1987 P. van Dijk
- 1988 H.P. Bennett, M.F.Noble (IM)
- 1989 H.P. Whitlock
- 1990 P.W. Stuart
- 1991 R.J. Dive, P.W. Stuart
- 1992 M.G. Hampl
- 1993(60)R.J. Dive
- 1994 G.B. Banks
- 1995 M.G. Hampl
- 1996 B.F. Barnard
- 1997 B.F. Barnard
- 1998 B.F. Barnard
- 1999 T.J. Doyle
- 2000 A.J. Short
- 2001 M.L. Dunwoody
- 2002 M.L. Dunwoody
- 2003(70)P.B. Goffin
- 2004 R.E. Gibbons
- 2005 R.E. Gibbons, M.F. Noble (SIM)
- 2006 H.P. Bennett
- 2007 H.P. Bennett, M.F. Noble (SIM)
- 2008 M.F. Noble (SIM)
- 2009 M.F. Noble (SIM)
- 2010 M.F. Noble (GM)
- 2011 M.F. Noble (GM), P.B. Goffin
- 2012 M.F. Noble (GM)
- 2013(80)M.F. Noble (GM)
- 2014 M.F. Noble (GM), M King, M Donnelly/King, J Eide
- 2015 M.F. Noble (GM)
- 2016 M.F. Noble (GM)
- 2017 M.F. Noble (GM)
- 2018 M.T. Sims
- 2019 M.D. McNabb
- 2020 M.D. McNabb
- 2021 M.F. Noble (GM), M.D. McNabb, M.T. Sims, R.E. Gibbons
- 2022 R.E. Gibbons, M King
- 2023 M.F.Noble (GM), F Chen, M.T. Sims, P Cook, L.D. Lavery
- 2024 L.D. Lavery

- M.F. Noble (GM) 15 Titles
- J.A. Cunningham, R.A. Court & R.E.Gibbons 4 Titles
- G.C. Cole, S.Hindin, O.Sarapu, D.I. Lynch, B.F. Barnard & H.P. Bennett, M D McNabb, 3 Titles

== New Zealand Veterans Champions ==
Winners of the New Zealand Veterans Championship (start year given):

- 2014 R. E. Gibbons, A. Booth, N. Cooper
- 2015 R. E. Gibbons, N. Cooper
- 2016 G. Kerr
- 2017 W. Lynn
- 2018 G. Kerr
- 2019 P. Garbett
- 2020 R. E. Gibbons

== See also ==
- Australian Chess Championship
- Oceania Chess Championship
