= Vivian Smith (chess player) =

New Zealand chess player (born 1951)

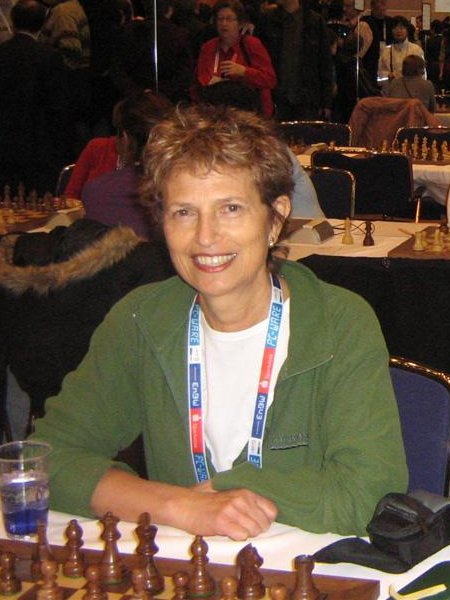
- Smith at the 38th Chess Olympiad in 2008

Personal information
- Full name: Vivian Joyce Smith
- Born: 15 September 1951 (age 74) Auckland, New Zealand

Chess career
- Country: New Zealand
- Title: Woman FIDE Master (2009)
- Peak rating: 2035 (January 1991)

Vivian Joyce Smith MNZM (née Barrowman, born 15 September 1951) is a New Zealand chess player. She has represented New Zealand in fifteen Chess Olympiads, and won the New Zealand Women's Chess Championship a record ten times. She is a Member of the New Zealand Order of Merit for her services to chess, and holds the title of Woman FIDE Master (WFM).

== Career ==
Smith learned to play chess at the age of ten but did not join a chess club or play in national tournaments until she was 26 years old. She joined the Waitakere Chess Club in 1977, and played in her first New Zealand Women's Chess Championship later that year, finishing 4th, beating the joint winner Fenella Foster in the last round.

Smith has won, or jointly won, the New Zealand Women's Chess Championship a record ten times between 1982 and 2004.

Smith represented New Zealand in fifteen Chess Olympiads between 1978 and 2010. Her best result was at the 26th Chess Olympiad in Thessaloniki, Greece in 1984, when she scored 7/9 and won the bronze medal on board 3. Smith gained the WCM title for scoring 5.5/11 at the 36th Chess Olympiad in Calvia, Spain in 2004, and gained the WFM title for scoring 6.5/9 at the 38th Chess Olympiad in Dresden, Germany in 2008.

Smith tied for first in the NZ Seniors Championship in 2007, and won the Oceania Senior Women's Chess Championship in 2010 and 2011.

Smith played in the Oceania Women's Chess Championships in Gold Coast 2001, Coral Coast 2002, Auckland 2005, Denarau 2007, Gold Coast 2009, Rotorua 2011, Queenstown, New Zealand 2012, and Nadi 2013.

Smith is a Life Member of the New Zealand Chess Federation and served on NZ Chess Federation Council 2001–2007 as Convenor of the Committee for Female Chess as well as the Committee for Junior Chess. During that time she established NZ's annual "Girls Chess Week" to encourage more girls to play chess, and established the NZCF Junior Badge Scheme.

Smith was awarded the title of FIDE Instructor in 2005. In the 2013 Queen's Birthday Honours, Smith was appointed a Member of the New Zealand Order of Merit, for services to chess.

== Personal life ==
She married FIDE Master Robert Smith in 1984 and they have three children. Smith has a Bachelor of Arts Degree in History, and worked as a secondary school teacher, a Human Resources Officer for Air New Zealand, and a chess coach in schools, before retiring to Mount Maunganui in 2010.

== Notable games ==
Vivian Smith - Teresa Sheehan, NZ Women's Chess Championship Auckland 1998, Queen's Pawn Game (D02), 1-0

1. d4 Nf6 2. Nf3 g6 3. Bf4 Bg7 4. e3 d5 5. Nbd2 O-O 6. h3 Nc6 7. Be2 Bf5 8. g4 Be4 9. Nxe4 Nxe4 10. Nd2 Nxd2 11. Qxd2 e5 12. dxe5 Nxe5 13. O-O-O c6 14. h4 Qb6 15. c3 a5 16. h5 Rfe8 17. hxg6 fxg6 18. Rh2 Re7 19. Rdh1 Bh8 20. Bg5 Rf7 21. f4 Nd7 22. Bd3 Nf8 23. f5 c5 24. fxg6 Nxg6 25. Bxg6 Qxg6 26. Qxd5 Rc8 27. Rxh7 Bf6 28. Bxf6 Qxf6 29. Rh8+ Qxh8 30. Rxh8+ Kxh8 31. Qxf7 b5 32. g5 b4 33. g6 1-0
