= Alan Kaufman =

Alan, Allan or Allen Kaufman may refer to:

== Writers ==
- Allan Kaufman, scenarist for the 1957 film Hell Canyon Outlaws
- Alan S. Kaufman (born 1944), psychologist and educator
- Alan Kaufman (writer), novelist and poet active since 1980s

== Others ==
- Allen Kaufman (born 1933), chess master
- Allan Kaufman, political figure who lost to Dorothy Dobbie in 1988

== See also ==
- Kaufman (surname)
