= Rodney Phillips =

New Zealand chess player

James Rodney Phillips (1942 – 19 September 1969) was a New Zealand chess player, who in January 1957 at age 14 became the youngest player ever to win that country's national championship, a record that stands to this day.

He was coached by the Estonian-born master Ortvin Sarapu, who spotted his talent at the age of 10. He played in the World Junior Championship in The Hague in 1961. He finished fourth in his preliminary group, thereby missing out on a place in the final group of 12, however he won the reserve group to finish 13th overall. Phillips competed in the 1967 British championship, won by Jonathan Penrose, where he finished in a tie for 10th place of the 36 competitors with a score of 6/11. He was found drowned in Wellington Harbour on 19 September 1969, a suspected suicide.
