= Lev Aptekar =

Soviet-New Zealand chess player (born 1936)

Lev Isaakovich Aptekar (born 26 November 1936 in Kyiv, USSR) is a Soviet–New Zealand - Australian chess master, coach and writer.

== Career ==
He finished 15th in the Kiev championship of 1963. In the mid-1970s, he left the Soviet Union for New Zealand. In 1975/76, he shared first with Murray Chandler and Ortvin Sarapu in the 83rd New Zealand Championships in Upper Hutt. In 1976/77, he finished 6th in Auckland (84th NZL-ch, Sarapu won). In 1979/80, he finished 6th in Upper Hutt (87th NZL-ch, Sarapu, Small and Green won). In 1980/81, he tied for 7–9th in Christchurch (88th NZL-ch, Sarapu, Small and Nokes won). In December 2011 he moved to Sydney, Australia.

Aptekar represented New Zealand in two Chess Olympiads:

- In 1980, at fourth board in 24th Olympiad in La Valletta (+3 –4 =4);
- In 1988, at 2nd reserve board in 28th Olympiad in Thessaloniki but really the non-playing captain.

He was the national chess coach for the 1990 Olympiad in Novi Sad.

=== Books ===
- Wisdom in chess (1987) Editor Bob Mitchell
- The Art of Chess - The Power of Tactics (2008) Editor Bob Mitchell - available on iPad app e+Books
- The Art of Chess - The Wisdom of Strategy (2008) Editor Bob Mitchell - available on iPad app e+Books
- The Art of Chess - The Flame of Attack (2008) Editor Bob Mitchell - available on iPad app e+Books
