= Martin Dreyer =

New Zealand chess player (born 1966)

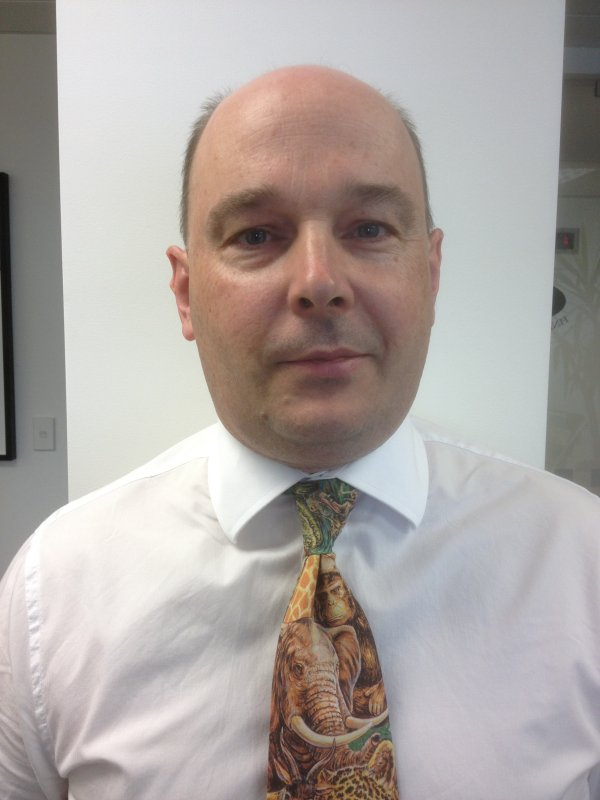
- Martin Dreyer

Personal information
- Born: 1 July 1966 (age 60) New Zealand

Chess career
- Country: New Zealand
- Title: FIDE Master (1993)
- Peak rating: 2345 (January 1993)

Martin Paul Dreyer is a New Zealand chess player and FIDE Master.

== Chess career ==
By winning the 1990 North Island Championship, Dreyer was selected to represent NZ at the 1990 Chess Olympics.

Dreyer has represented New Zealand in three Chess Olympiads in Novi Sad 1990, Manila 1992, and Yerevan 1996. His best result was in 1992 when he scored 6½/9, finishing in 9th place on the reserve board.

Dreyer won the New Zealand Chess Championship in Dunedin 1991/92, and jointly with Russell Dive and Robert Smith in Wellington 1995/96. He also jointly won the New Zealand Rapid Chess Championship in 1994/95.

Dreyer was awarded the FIDE Master (FM) title in 1992. Dreyer is a former Councillor of the New Zealand Chess Federation and a member of the Howick Pakuranga Chess Club.

== Personal life ==
Martin Dreyer has been married since 2003 to Gemma Dreyer. They have two children.

Away from the Chess Board, Dreyer is the managing director of D&D Financial Consultants, an accounting firm specializing in property tax.

In July 2017, Dreyer published his first book, titled "The 100 Greatest Sportspeople of All Time".

== Notable games ==
- Martin Dreyer vs Anthony Miles, Auckland Netway Masters (1992), Owen Defense: Classical Variation, (B00), 1/2-1/2
