= Roger Nokes =

New Zealand chess player and professor (born 1958)

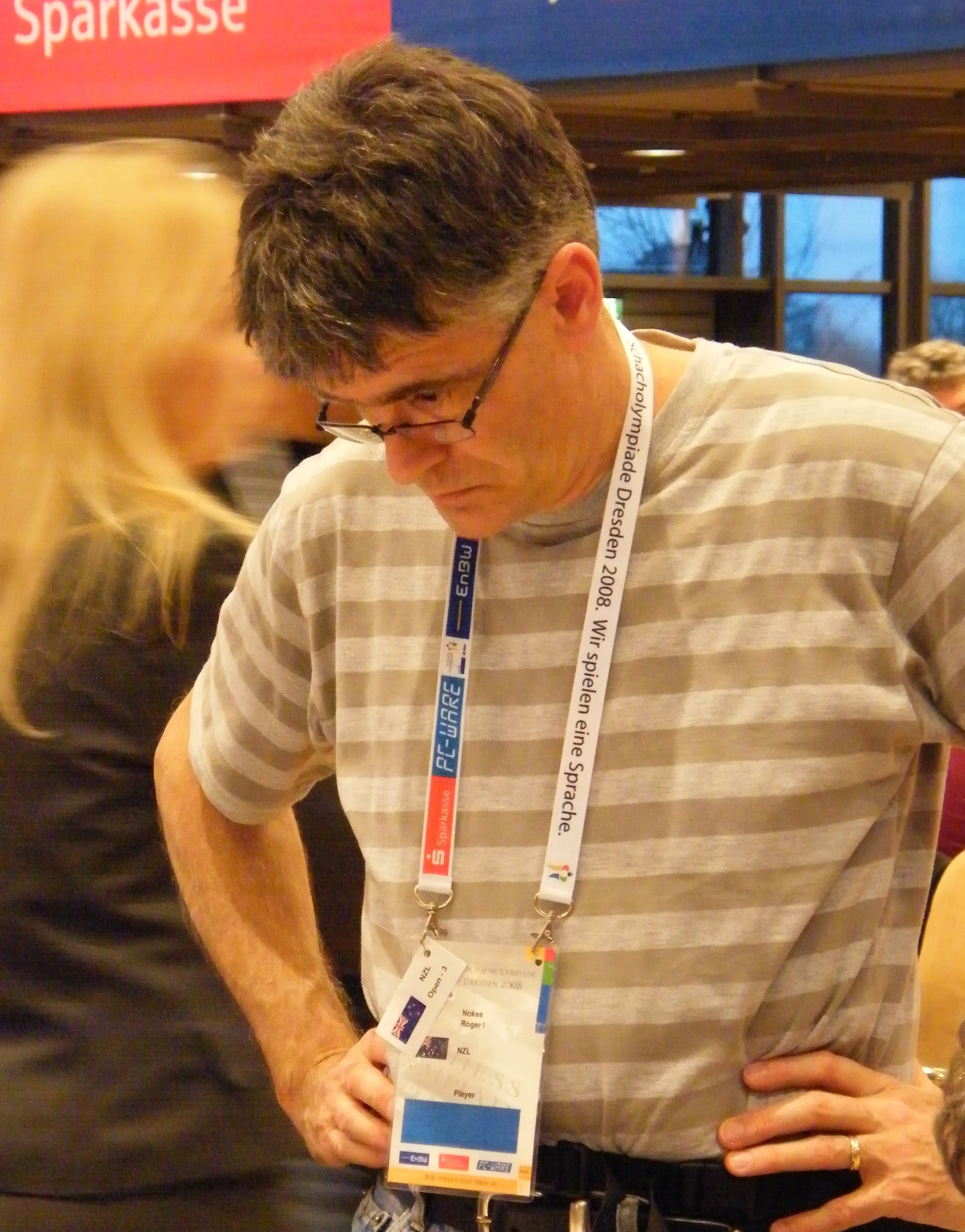

Personal information
- Born: 13 August 1958 (age 67)

Chess career
- Country: New Zealand
- Title: FIDE Master (1984)
- FIDE rating: 2305 (January 2010)
- Peak rating: 2345 (January 1982)

Roger Ian Nokes (born 13 August 1958) is a New Zealand emeritus professor in the Department of Civil and Natural Resources Engineering at the University of Canterbury, New Zealand, specialising in fluid mechanics and is also a chess master. Nokes was a university council member, was head of the Department of Civil and Natural Resources Engineering between 2009 and 2012 (coinciding with the 2010 and 2011 Canterbury Earthquakes) and has achieved a number of teaching awards. Nokes is a member of the Royal Society of New Zealand.

== Teaching awards ==
- 1993 – University of Auckland University Teaching Medal
- 2001 – UCSA Best Lecturer at the University of Canterbury
- 2003 – University of Canterbury University Teaching Award
- 2006 – National Tertiary Teaching Excellence Award
- 2008 – UCSA Best Lecturer at the University of Canterbury

== Chess career ==
In 1980 Nokes was joint New Zealand Chess Champion with Ortvin Sarapu and Vernon Small and represented New Zealand at the Chess Olympiad in 1982, 2004, 2006, and 2008. He is a FIDE Master.

== Private life ==
Nokes lives in Golden Bay / Mohua's Tata Beach. He offers a chess club for students at Golden Bay High School.
