= Felix Xie =

New Zealand chess player (born 2008)

Personal information
- Born: 2008 (age 17–18) Auckland, New Zealand

Chess career
- Country: New Zealand
- Title: International Master (2026)
- FIDE rating: 2435 (November 2026)
- Peak rating: 2439 (October 2026)

Felix Xie is a New Zealand chess player and International Master. He has represented New Zealand at three Chess Olympiads.

== Chess career ==
In January 2021, he won the New Zealand Rapid Chess Championship and tied for first in the North Island Championship.

In July 2022, he played as Board 3 for New Zealand at the 44th Chess Olympiad at the age of 14. Xie managed to hold a draw against grandmaster Niaz Murshed, finishing with a score of 3/9 and a performance rating of 1901.

In September 2024, Xie played as Board 1 for New Zealand at the 45th Chess Olympiad. He finished with a score of 4½/9 with a performance rating of 2275, including a win against grandmaster Temur Kuybokarov.

In January 2025, he tied with grandmaster Gábor Nagy in the New Zealand Chess Championship, both accumulating zero losses during the event. They were crowned as co-champions.

In September 2026, Xie returned as Board 1 for New Zealand at the 46th Chess Olympiad. He finished with a score of 6½/10, with a performance rating of 2533.
