= Anthony Ker =

New Zealand chess player (born 1967)

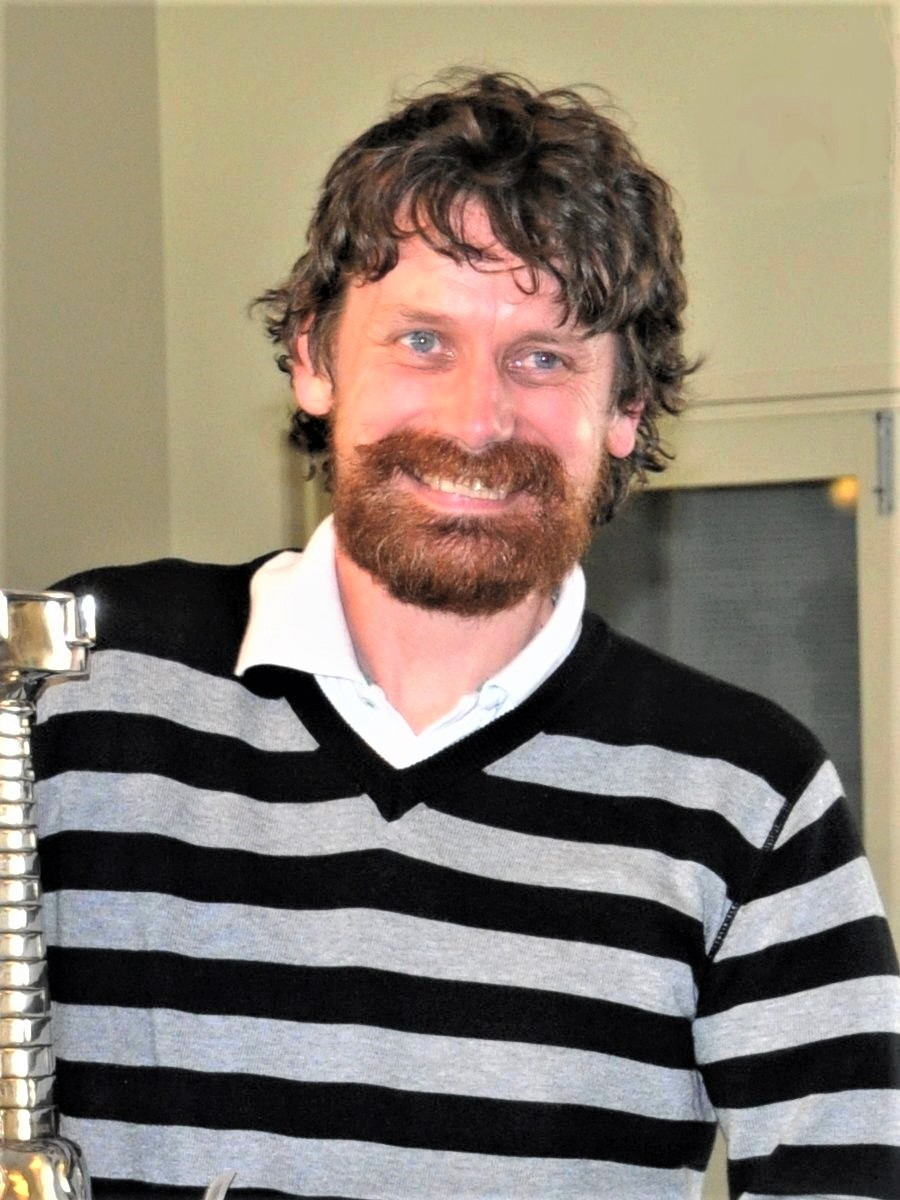
- Anthony Ker at the 117th NZ Chess Championship, Auckland, January 2010

Personal information
- Born: June 27, 1967 (age 59) Wellington, New Zealand

Chess career
- Country: New Zealand
- Title: International Master (2000)
- Peak rating: 2359 (November 2011)

Anthony Fergus Ker (born 1967) is a New Zealand chess International Master (IM).

== Chess career ==
Ker has represented New Zealand in eight Chess Olympiads between 1988 and 2018. His best result was in 1988 when he scored 7½/12.

Ker has won or jointly won the New Zealand Chess Championship fourteen times since 1988/89.

Anthony Ker was awarded the IM title when he finished third, with 6/9, in the Oceania Zonal Chess Championship held in Auckland, New Zealand in May 2000. He also competed in the Oceania Chess Championships in 2002, 2005 and 2012.

Ker has had a decades-long friendly rivalry with fellow IM and New Zealand Champion Russell Dive.

== Bridge ==
Ker is also a strong bridge player who has represented New Zealand at several international events.

== Notable games ==
- Anthony Ker vs Boris Spassky, Wellington Plaza 1988, King's Indian Defense: Saemisch Variation, (E83), 1/2-1/2
- Anthony Ker vs Edhi Handoko, South East Asian Zonal 1995, Slav Defense: Exchange Variation, (D10), 1-0
