= Kathleen Hindle =

Scottish chess player (1948–2025)

Personal information
- Born: 5 October 1948 Glasgow, Scotland
- Died: 22 February 2025 (aged 76) Norfolk, England
- Spouse: Owen Hindle (m. 1968)

Chess career
- Country: Scotland

Kathleen Josephine Hindle (5 October 1948 – 22 February 2025), née Patterson, was a Scottish chess player. She twice shared first place in the Scottish Women's Chess Championships.

== Biography ==
From the end of 1960s to the begin of 1980s, Kathleen Hindle was one of Scotland's strongest female chess players. She twice won Glasgow Girls' Chess Championships (1965, 1966). In 1966, in Dundee she won the Scottish Girls' Chess Championship, and a year later the British Under-18 Girls' Chess Championship. Kathleen Hindle twice shared 1st place the Scottish Women's Chess Championships: 1975 (with Muriel Leask) and 1979.

Kathleen Hindle played for Scotland in the Women's Chess Olympiads:

- In 1976, at second board in the 7th Chess Olympiad (women) in Haifa (+2, =1, -6),
- In 1978, at second board in the 8th Chess Olympiad (women) in Buenos Aires (+4, =3, -5),
- In 1980, at first board in the 9th Chess Olympiad (women) in Valletta (+3, =4, -5).
- In 1982, at third board in the 10th Chess Olympiad (women) in Lucerne (+3, =3, -4).

In 1968 Kathleen Hindle married the English chess master Owen Hindle.
