= Scott Wastney =

New Zealand chess player (born 1970)

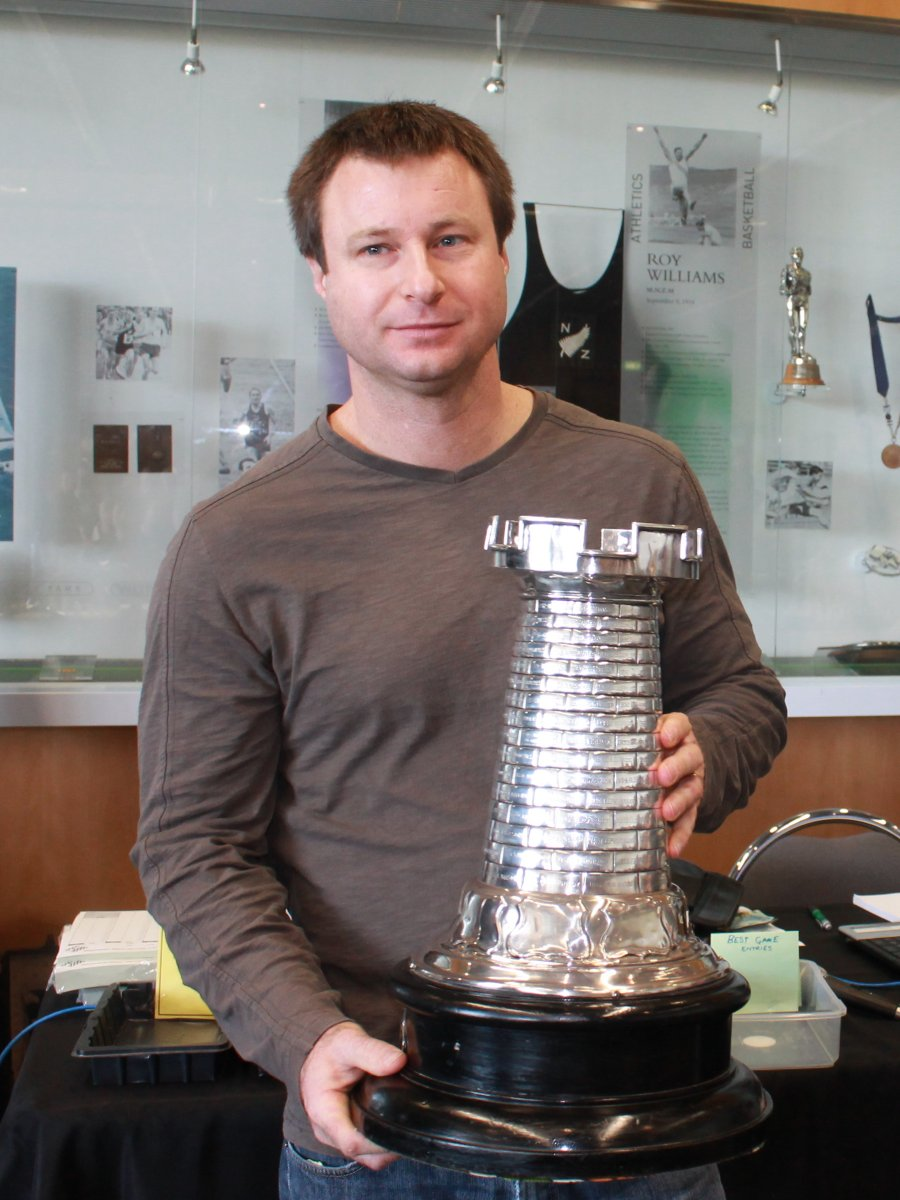
- Wastney receiving the NZ Chess Championship Silver Rook trophy in 2013

Personal information
- Born: 17 November 1970 (age 55) New Zealand

Chess career
- Country: New Zealand
- Title: FIDE Master (2001)
- FIDE rating: 2304 (May 2021)
- Peak rating: 2370 (April 2016)

Scott Wastney (born 1970) is a New Zealand chess player who holds the title of FIDE Master (FM).

== Chess career ==
Wastney has represented New Zealand in four Chess Olympiads between 1996 and 2002. His best result was at the 34th Chess Olympiad in Istanbul 2000 when he scored 6/9, finishing in 10th place on the 2nd reserve board.

Wastney won the New Zealand Chess Championship in Waitakere City 2000/01, in Wellington 2013 and in 2017.

Wastney scored 5.5/9, finishing 5th, in the Oceania Zonal Chess Championship on the Gold Coast, Queensland in 2001, and was awarded the FIDE Master (FM) title for his result.

== Notable games ==
- Paul Garbett vs Scott Wastney, 109th NZ Championship, Christchurch (2001/02), Grünfeld Defense: Three Knights Variation, (D91), 0-1
