= Alfred William Gyles =

New Zealand chess player

Alfred William Gyles (7 March 1888 – 15 May 1967) was a New Zealand chess champion on two occasions—1930/31 and 1935/36.

Gyles was born in Wellington, New Zealand and died in Levin.
