= Richard John Sutton =

New Zealand legal academic and chess player

Dr Richard John Sutton
- Born: September 23, 1938; London, England
- Died: April 17, 2009 (aged 70); Dunedin, New Zealand
- Education: University of Auckland (BA, LLM); Harvard Law School (LLM)
- Occupations: Legal academic; chess player
- Employer(s): Faculty of Law, University of Otago
- Title: FIDE Master
- Awards: New Zealand National Chess Champion (1962-63, 1970-72); New Zealand North Island Chess Champion (1966, 1971); New Zealand South Island Chess Champion (1989, 2004); New Zealand Correspondence Chess Champion (1970)

Dr Richard John Sutton (23 September 1938 – 17 April 2009) was a New Zealand legal academic and chess player. He was twice the dean of the Faculty of Law of the University of Otago and was the New Zealand national chess champion in 1962–63 and 1970–72.

Sutton was born in London, England. He earned BA and LLM degrees from Auckland University and an LLM from Harvard Law School. He was employed at the University of Auckland Law School and in 1980 became a full professor at the Faculty of Law of the University of Otago in Dunedin. At Otago, he served on two occasions as dean of the faculty. He became an emeritus professor in 2005.

Sutton also served as a Commissioner for the New Zealand Law Commission.

Sutton became the New Zealand national chess champion in 1962. The final game against Ortvin Sarapu ended in a draw, so Sutton and Sarapu were declared co-champions. In 1970 and 1971, Sutton won the New Zealand championship outright. Sutton competed for New Zealand in the 1972 Chess Olympiad in Yugoslavia and in 1975 lost to Jørn Sloth in the final of the world championship of correspondence chess.

Sutton died of cancer in Dunedin.

== Sources ==
- "Legal scholar dies", Otago Daily Times, 2009-04-20
- Richard Sutton 1938–2009, Otago Daily Times chess column, by Quentin Johnson, 5 May 2009.
