= Ewen Green (chess player) =

New Zealand chess player and teacher (born 1950)

Personal information
- Full name: Ewen McGowen Green
- Born: 4 April 1950 (age 76)

Chess career
- Country: New Zealand
- Title: FIDE Master (1992)
- Peak rating: 2335 (January 1981)

Ewen McGowen Green (born 4 April 1950) is a New Zealand chess player who is a freelance chess teacher in Auckland, New Zealand.

Green attained FIDE Master status in 1992. In 1979–80 he won the New Zealand Chess Championship along with Vernon A. Small and Ortvin Sarapu and has also been an Olympiad player (1970, 1974, 1976).

In 2013, he was equal second in New Zealand Chess Championship.

He is regarded as one of New Zealand's best chess coaches; he coached Cliff Curtis and other cast members of the New Zealand film The Dark Horse.

Green holds the Oceania record for simultaneous games of blindfold chess of 17 boards (13 wins, 1 draw, 3 losses) in an arbitered demonstration.
