= Daniel Hanwen Gong =

New Zealand chess player (born 2003)

Personal information
- Born: 12 January 2003 (age 23) Auckland, New Zealand

Chess career
- Country: New Zealand
- Title: FIDE Master (2017)
- Peak rating: 2335 (February 2023)

Daniel Hanwen Gong is a New Zealand chess player and FIDE Master. He has represented New Zealand three times at the Chess Olympiad.

== Chess career ==
Gong won the New Zealand Chess Championship in 2022 and 2023.

In July 2022, Gong played on the first board for New Zealand at the 44th Chess Olympiad and scored 6½/9, drawing against grandmasters Novendra Priasmoro and Enamul Hossain and achieving a performance rating of 2412.

In September 2024, he played on the reserve board for New Zealand at the 45th Chess Olympiad and scored 5/9 with a performance rating of 2166.

In September 2026, Gong played as Board 4 for New Zealand at the 46th Chess Olympiad. He finished with a score of 6/9, with a performance rating of 2299. He secured a win against grandmaster Ermes Espinosa Veloz in the final round.
