= Vernon Small =

New Zealand chess player (born 1954)

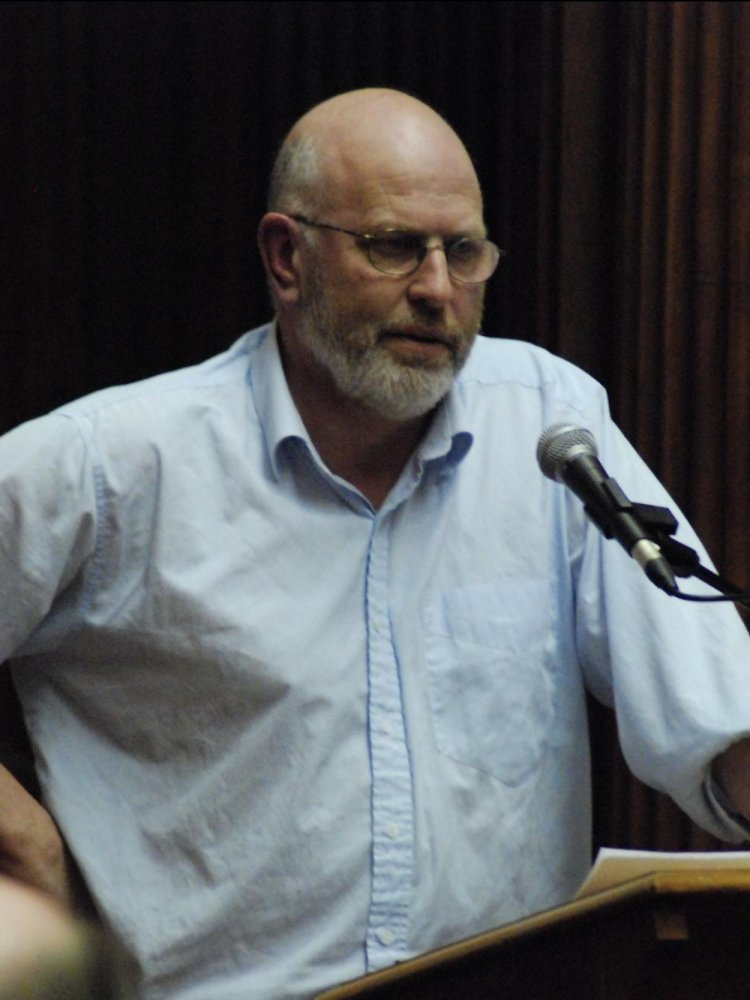
- Vernon Small at the "Journalism Matters" EPMU Summit Meeting, Wellington 2007.

Personal information
- Born: 18 July 1954 (age 72) England

Chess career
- Country: New Zealand
- Title: International Master (1988)
- FIDE rating: 2313 (April 2005)
- Peak rating: 2390 (January 1989)

Vernon Albert Small (born 18 July 1954, England) is a New Zealand journalist and chess International Master (IM). He represented New Zealand in eight Chess Olympiads from 1976 to 1992. Previously a journalist for Fairfax Media, Small worked as a press secretary to Cabinet minister David Parker from 2017 to 2023.

== Biography ==
Small moved to New Zealand at the age of 9 in 1964 from England. Small was educated at Shirley Boys' High School in Christchurch, New Zealand. He was awarded a PhD in English Literature from the University of Canterbury (New Zealand) in 1985. His doctoral thesis was titled The authorial persona: A truth conditional account.

Small worked as a business and political journalist for The New Zealand Herald and The Dominion Post as deputy political editor and, also at the Post, national affairs editor. For more than two decades he was based in the press gallery at Parliament and was made a life member. During the period of the Sixth Labour Government, from 2017 to 2023, he worked as a senior press secretary to Cabinet minister David Parker.

He lives in Wellington, New Zealand.

== Chess career ==
He represented New Zealand in eight Chess Olympiads from 1976 to 1992, playing on board 1 in 1982, 1984 and 1988. His best result was his Olympiad debut at the 22nd Chess Olympiad, Haifa 1976, when he scored 7/9, and finished equal third with Grandmaster Larry Evans for the bronze medal on board 3.

Small won or jointly won the New Zealand Chess Championship on four occasions; 1979/80 (shared with Ortvin Sarapu and Ewen Green), 1980/81 (shared with Ortvin Sarapu and Roger Nokes), 1981/82, and 1984/85.

He has defeated a number of strong players, including Jonathan Mestel, Eugenio Torre and Oscar Panno.

== Notable games ==
- Vernon Small vs Oscar Panno, Olympiad 1988, French Defense: Tarrasch Variation, (C03), 1-0
