= Puchen Wang =

New Zealand chess player (born 1990)

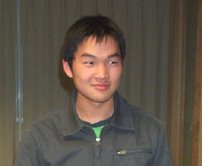

Personal information
- Born: 20 January 1990 (age 36)

Chess career
- Country: New Zealand
- Title: International Master (2007)
- FIDE rating: 2455 (July 2026)
- Peak rating: 2478 (September 2010)

Puchen Wang (born 20 January 1990) is a New Zealand chess International Master. He became the New Zealand Champion, Rapid Champion and Lightning Champion in January 2007 when he was 17.

== Chess career ==
Wang was New Zealand Junior Champion at the age of 11, and a winner in the 2005 and 2006 NZCF Grand Prix, topping both the Open and Junior sections.

Wang has twice played for the New Zealand national team at the Chess Olympiads; in 2004, on 1st reserve board at the 36th Chess Olympiad in Calvià (+5 –3 =1); and in 2006, on 1st reserve board at the 37th Chess Olympiad in Turin (+5 –1 =3). He has been selected for board 2 for the 38th Chess Olympiad in Dresden in 2008, behind Grandmaster Murray Chandler.

In May–June 2006, Wang gained the FIDE Master title and an IM norm at the 37th Chess Olympiad in Turin. He won in the 114th New Zealand Championship at Wanganui 2007, at the age of 17. In May 2007 he came away unbeaten in the Zonal Tournament of Oceania held in Fiji. He shared second place, behind Zhao Zong-Yuan of Australia, with a score of 6 1/2/9 that enabled him to be awarded the International Master (IM) title.

He was invited to the Euwe Stimulus Tournament in Arnhem, The Netherlands, 17–26 August 2007. It was an invitational tournament in the format of a nine-round Round Robin. Together with this group, ten players competed in a regional group. Players included Grandmasters Dibyendu Barua, Oscar Panno, Friðrik Ólafsson and Nona Gaprindashvili. The tournament was won by Amon Simutowe, and Wang was placed third.

He was not able to defend his New Zealand Champion title in January 2008 as he was due to sit an exam, but he did retain his Lightning title.

For the year 2008, Wang is taking a gap year before going to university to try to achieve the Grandmaster (GM) title. Wang will be travelling to Europe mid-February 2008 to play in several strong events to gain experience and gain opportunities to become New Zealand's second Grandmaster (after Murray Chandler). He is being supported and project managed in this by the New Zealand Chess Federation, and there was a "launch" at the 115th New Zealand Chess Congress in January 2008 of "Project Grandmaster". The New Zealand Chess Federation is seeking to provide the best tournament format and funding vehicle to maximise his chances for success, which they estimate a budget of $50,000 is required.

He began this European tour with the 24th Cappelle La Grande Open (16–23 February 2008) in Spain. Seeded 140th out of 612 players, he finished 71st with a score of 6/9 (+4, =4, -1) and tournament performance rating of 2425.

In 2014 he again became New Zealand Champion.
