= Benjamin Martin (chess player) =

New Zealand chess player and mathematician

Personal information
- Born: 1969 (age 56–57)

Chess career
- Country: New Zealand
- Title: International Master (1996)
- FIDE rating: 2375 (January 2013)
- Peak rating: 2410 (January 1993)

Benjamin Martin (born 1969) is a New Zealand chess player and mathematician. He was awarded the title International Master (IM) by FIDE in 1996.

== Chess career ==
Martin has represented New Zealand in four Chess Olympiads, in Novi Sad 1990, Manila 1992, Yerevan 1996, and Istanbul 2000. His best result was in 1996 when he scored 8/14.

Martin jointly won the New Zealand Chess Championship with Ortvin Sarapu in 1989/90.

== Mathematics ==
Martin was an associate professor in the department of mathematics at the University of Auckland 2011–2014. His research interests include algebraic groups and quantum field theory. He is now a professor in the department of mathematics at the University of Aberdeen, holding a personal chair.
