= Aleksei Kulashko =

New Zealand chess player (born 1972)

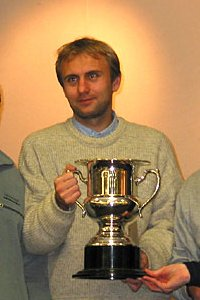
- Aleksei Kulashko at the Waitakere Trust chess tournament, Auckland 2002.

Personal information
- Born: 3 July 1972 (age 54) Leningrad, Russian SFSR, Soviet Union

Chess career
- Country: Russia (until 1996); New Zealand (since 1996)
- Title: FIDE Master (1999)
- FIDE rating: 2354 (February 2016)
- Peak rating: 2400 (July 2000)

Aleksei Kulashko (born 3 July 1972) is a New Zealand chess player holding the title of FIDE Master (FM).

Born in Leningrad, he moved to New Zealand after graduating from university.

Kulashko has represented New Zealand in four Chess Olympiads: in Elista 1998, Bled 2002, Baku 2016 and Batumi 2018 playing board 1 in 1998, 2002 and 2016. His best result was in 1998 when he scored 7.5/11, and finished in 9th place.

Kulashko won the New Zealand Chess Championship in 1996/97, 1997/98, 1999/2000 and in 2015/16 (jointly with Michael V. R. Steadman). In 2016 he also became Oceania champion. He also won the New Zealand Rapid Chess Championship in 1997/1998.

Alexei Kulashko was the joint NZ champion, with Felix Xie, in the 2024 NZ Fischer-Random Chess Championship.

He competed in the Oceania Zonal Chess Championship in 1999, 2000, and 2005.
