= Allen Kaufman =

American chess player

- Born: 1933 (age 92–93); New York City
- Known for: American Chess Foundation, Chess-in-the-Schools

Allen Kaufman (born 1933) is an American chess player and the former Executive Director of the American Chess Foundation and Chess-in-the-Schools.

Kaufman, a longtime member of the Marshall Chess Club and former president and vice-president, competed nationally in chess in the 1950s. In 1954, Kaufman finished seventh in the U.S. Open. In 1957 at the U.S. Open, while ultimately finishing out of contention, Kaufman was in first place after the fourth round and tied for third after the sixth round. In 1958, Kaufman came in sixth in the U.S. Open. The winner, Eldis Cobo Arteaga, lost his only game to Kaufman.

As the executive director of the American Chess Foundation, Kaufman expanded their program of teaching chess to school-age children, leading to the name change of the organization to "Chess-in-the-Schools". Kaufman is an advocate of chess as mental training and believes that chess increases children's reading and reasoning skills.

At the American Chess Foundation, Kaufman aided the chess prodigy Gata Kamsky in his defection from the Soviet Union in 1989. He was also instrumental in the formation of the Samford Chess Fellowship and is former secretary of the fellowship committee. Kaufman has a Morphy Number of 4 through, for example, Arthur Bisguier and Norman T. Whitaker.

Kaufman was a friend of Bobby Fischer in his teen years.
