= Judy Gao =

New Zealand chess player and fashion designer (born 1994)

Personal information
- Born: March 4, 1994 (age 32)

Chess career
- Country: New Zealand
- Title: Woman FIDE Master (2012)
- Peak rating: 1949 (January 2012)

Judy Gao (born 1994) is a New Zealand fashion designer, reality TV star and chess player.

== Biography ==
Gao is a competitive chess player and is ranked fifth among New Zealand women. She represented New Zealand in the Chess Olympiads in 2008, 2012 and 2014 and holds the title of Woman FIDE Master.

She founded her label Judy Gao Couture in 2017. In 2018, she was a participant on the television reality show Project Runway New Zealand. Following her appearance on the show, she was invited to show a collection at Paris Fashion Week. She also showed a collection at New Zealand Fashion Week in 2019.
