= Paul Garbett =

New Zealand chess player (born 1952)

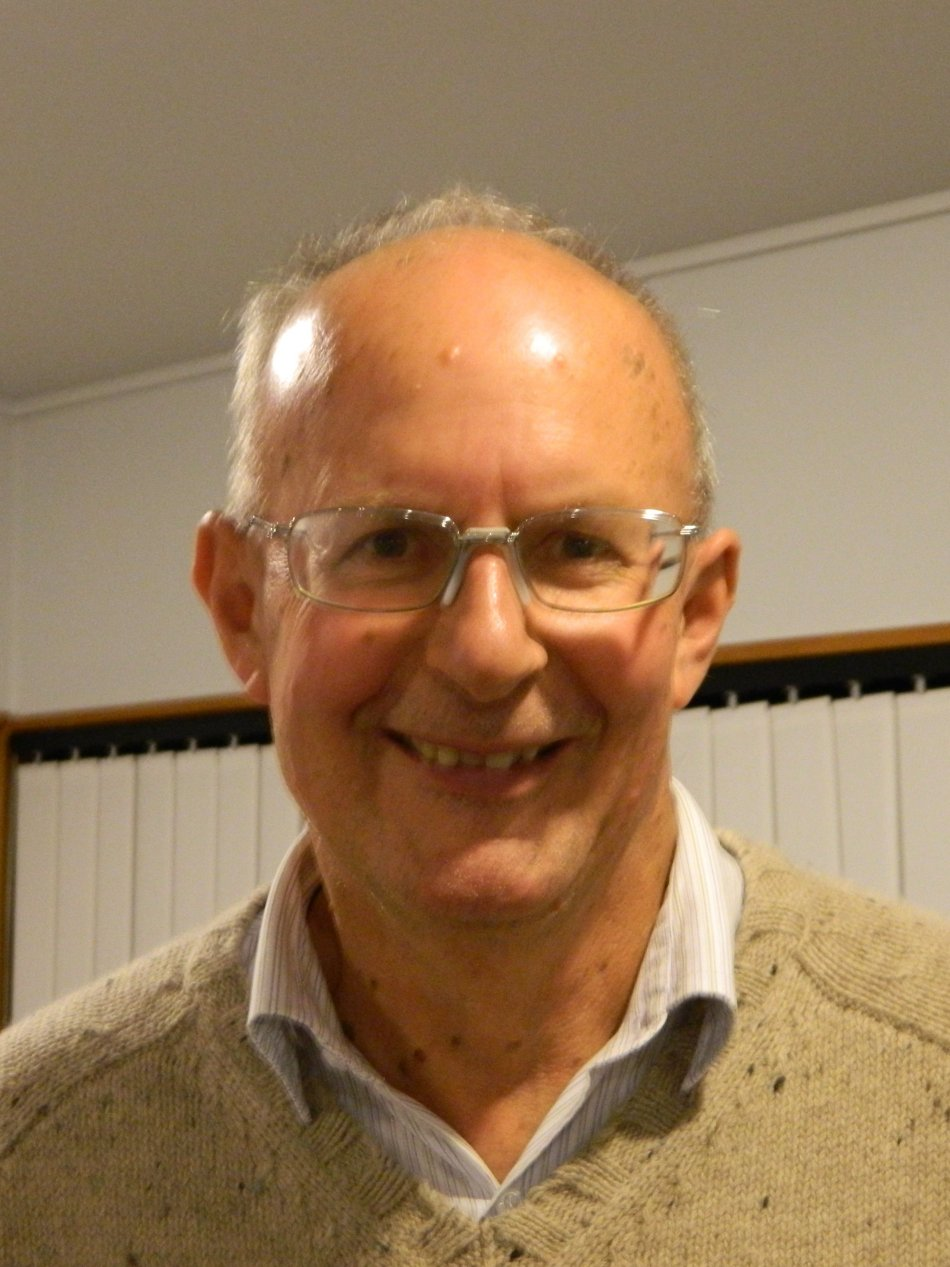
- Paul Garbett, New Zealand chess International Master, July 2012

Personal information
- Born: 18 December 1952 (age 73) Auckland, New Zealand

Chess career
- Country: New Zealand
- Title: International Master (2005)
- Peak rating: 2372 (January 1999)

Paul Anthony Garbett (born 18 December 1952, Auckland) is a New Zealand chess player and International Master.

== Chess career ==
Garbett has represented New Zealand in six Chess Olympiads between 1974 and 2012. His best result was in 1990 when he scored 5/11 on board 1.

Garbett competed in the Asian Zonal Chess Championship in Melbourne 1975 and Kuala Lumpur 1990. He competed in the Oceania Chess Championship in 2000, 2005, 2009 and 2012. Garbett gained his International Master title when he scored 6½/9, and finished joint second with Darryl Johansen, George Xie and Jonathan Humphrey, in the 2005 Oceania Zonal Chess Championship in Auckland.

Garbett won or jointly won the New Zealand Chess Championship seven times in 1973/74, 1974/75, 1982/83, 1983/84, 1988/89, 2015 and 2020. He holds the record for the longest timespan between first and latest title. He also jointly won the New Zealand Rapid Chess Championship in 2003/04 and in 2013.

He has won the NZ Correspondence Chess Championship twice: in 1971 (the youngest ever by 9 days ahead of Michael Freeman) and 1982.

== Notable games ==
- Paul Anthony Garbett vs Vasilios Kotronias, Olympiad Novi Sad (1990), Sicilian Defense: Richter-Rauzer Variation, (B63), 1-0
