= Michael Freeman (chess player) =

New Zealand chess player

Personal information
- Full name: Michael Roy Freeman
- Born: 9 December 1960 (age 65) United Kingdom

Chess career
- Country: New Zealand
- Title: Candidate Master (2013), Senior International Correspondence Chess Master (2003)
- FIDE rating: 2203 (October 2017)
- Peak rating: 2218 (January 2004)
- ICCF rating: 2530 (October 2021)
- ICCF peak rating: 2534 (April 2019)

Michael Roy Freeman (born 9 December 1960) is a New Zealand chess player.

He was NZ Correspondence Champion in 1979/80 and 1983/84, and earned a NZ Correspondence Chess Master title. In 1995 he gained an International Correspondence Master title (2450 level) and in 2003 he won the International Correspondence Chess Federation (ICCF) 50th anniversary IM-D event and gained a Senior International Master title.

Freeman has represented NZ in chess at the 1996 Chess Olympiad and the 1983, 1993 and 1995 Asian Teams events. He was NZ Team Captain for four Chess Olympiads (1994, 1996, 1998, 2000) and a member of the FIDE Executive Board from 1998 to 2002. He is the current FIDE delegate and the NZ delegate to the ICCF.

Freeman is also webmaster of the NZ Chess website www.nzchess.co.nz.

Freeman is a civil servant working for the Stratford District Council.
