= Jonathan Sarfati =

New Zealand young earth creationist and chess player (born 1964)

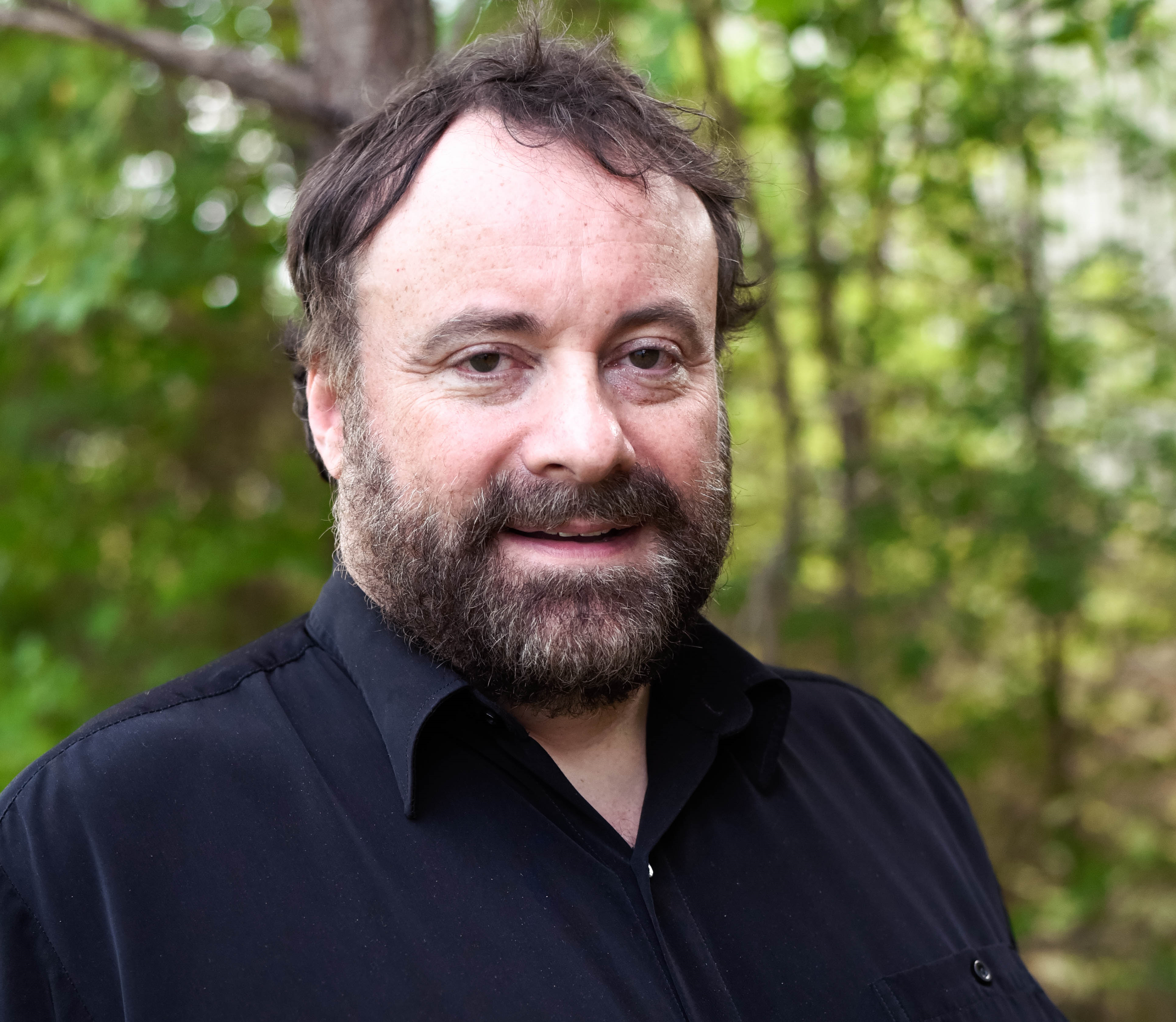

Personal information
- Born: October 1, 1964 (age 61) Ararat, Victoria, Australia

Chess career
- Country: New Zealand
- Title: FIDE Master (1989)
- Peak rating: 2325 (January 1989)

Jonathan David Sarfati (born 1 October 1964) is a New Zealand young Earth creationist who writes articles for Creation Ministries International (CMI), a non-profit Christian apologetics ministry. Sarfati has a PhD in chemistry, and was New Zealand national chess champion in 1987 and 1988.

== Background ==
Born in Ararat, Victoria, Sarfati moved with his family to New Zealand as a child, where he became a dual Australian and New Zealand citizen. He attended Wellington College in New Zealand, later graduating from Victoria University of Wellington with a BSc (Hons.) in chemistry, and a PhD in the same subject for a thesis entitled "A Spectroscopic Study of some Chalcogenide Ring and Cage Molecules". He co-authored a paper on high-temperature superconductors that was published in Nature in 1987 ("Letters to Nature"), and from 1988 to 1995, had five papers on spectroscopy of condensed matter samples published in other peer-reviewed scientific journals. In 1996, he returned to Brisbane, Australia to work for the Creation Science Foundation, then Answers in Genesis, then its current name Creation Ministries International. In 2010, he moved to the American office of that ministry.

== Creationism ==
Sarfati was a founder of the Wellington Christian Apologetics Society in New Zealand, and has long retained an interest in Christian apologetics and the creation–evolution controversy. His first two books, Refuting Evolution in 1999, and Refuting Evolution 2 in 2002, are intended as rebuttals to the National Academy of Sciences' publication Teaching about Evolution and the Nature of Science and the PBS/Nova series Evolution, respectively. Refuting Compromise, published in 2004, is Sarfati's rebuttal of the day-age creationist teachings of Hugh Ross, who attempts to harmonise the Genesis account of creation with mainstream science regarding the age of the Earth and the possible size of the Biblical Flood, against which Sarfati defends a literal biblical timeline and a global flood. Eugenie Scott and Glenn Branch of the National Center for Science Education called Sarfati's Refuting Evolution 2 a "crude piece of propaganda".

== Other views ==
Sarfati is a critic of geocentrism, the Myth of the flat Earth and flat Earth teaching, homosexual behaviour, and abortion except to save the life of the mother. While opposing embryonic stem cell research, he supports adult stem cell research. Sarfati also supports vaccination and rebuts anti-vaccination arguments.

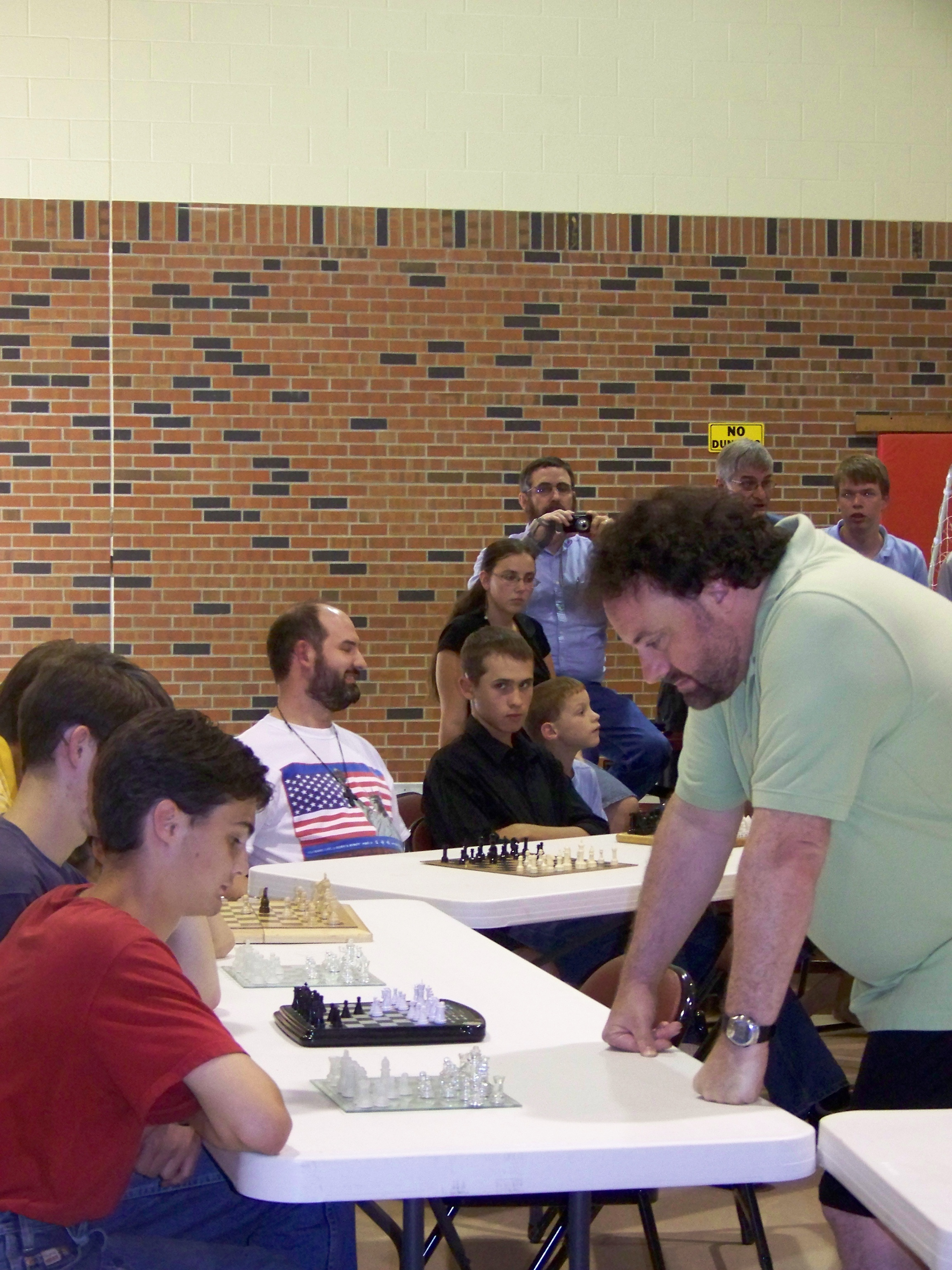
Sarfati playing chess against multiple players at a creation conference, 2011.

== Chess ==
Sarfati is a chess FIDE Master, and achieved a draw against former world champion Boris Spassky during a tournament in Wellington in 1988, and was New Zealand's national chess champion in 1987–88.

Although tied with Rey Casse for first place in the Australian Junior Championship of 1981, he was not eligible to share the title as he was a resident of New Zealand at the time. He represented New Zealand in three Chess Olympiads: the 27th in Dubai in 1986, the 28th in Thessaloniki in 1988, and the 30th in Manila in 1992. He also represented New Zealand on top board at the 5th Asian Teams in New Delhi.

He has given blindfold chess exhibitions at chess clubs and other events, and has played twelve such games simultaneously. His previous best was winning 11/11 at the Kāpiti Chess Club in New Zealand.

== Bibliography ==
- The Genesis Account: A theological, historical, and scientific commentary on Genesis 1-11, 2015, Creation Book Publishers ISBN 978-1921643910
- Christianity for Skeptics, 2012, with Steve Kumar (first author), Creation Book Publishers ISBN 978-1921643491
- The Greatest Hoax on Earth? Refuting Dawkins on Evolution, 2010, Creation Book Publishers ISBN 1-921643-06-4
- By Design: Evidence for nature's Intelligent Designer—the God of the Bible, 2008, Creation Book Publishers ABN: 978-0-949906-72-4
- Refuting Compromise: A Biblical and Scientific Refutation of Progressive Creationism, 2004, Creation Book Publishers ISBN 0-89051-411-9
- The Revised & Expanded Answers Book, 2003, with Carl Wieland and David Catchpoole, edited by Don Batten, ISBN 0-89051-395-3
- Refuting Evolution 2, 2002/2011, Creation Book Publishers ISBN 0-89051-387-2
- Refuting Evolution, 1999–2010, Creation Book Publishers ISBN 0-89051-258-2
