= Sergei Matsenko =

Russian chess grandmaster (born 1990)

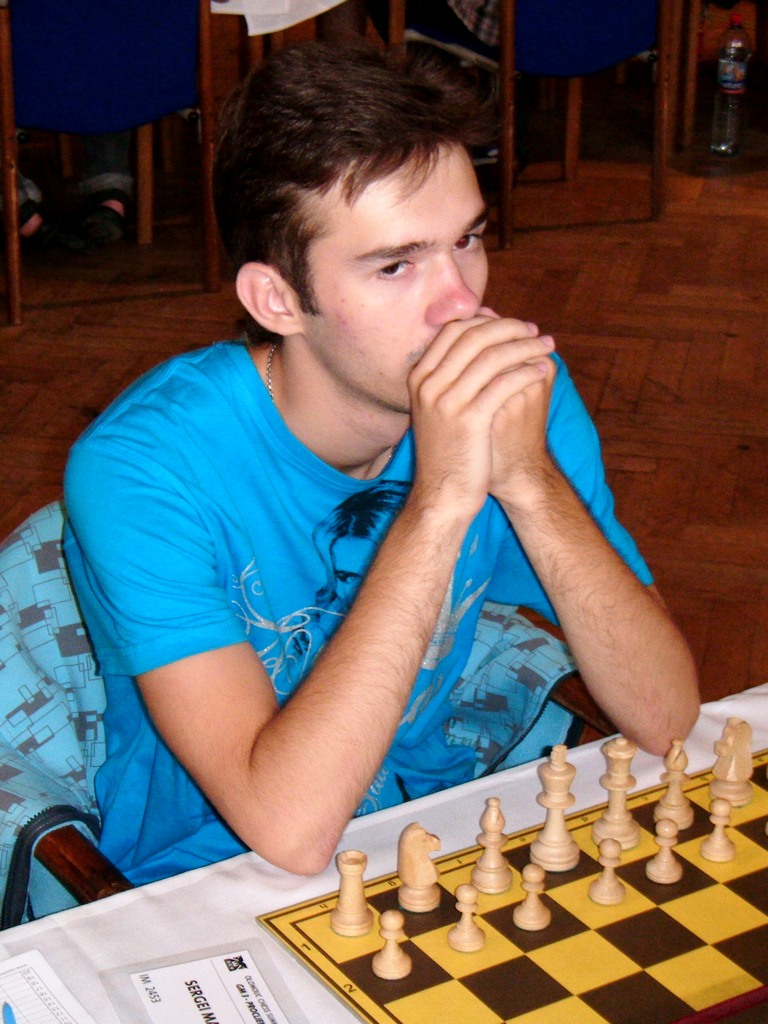
- Matsenko in 2010

Personal information
- Born: Sergei Vadimovich Matsenko; 21 June 1990 (age 36) Chelyabinsk, Russia

Chess career
- Country: Russia
- Title: Grandmaster (2018)
- FIDE rating: 2528 (July 2026)
- Peak rating: 2563 (May 2018)

Sergei Vadimovich Matsenko (Russian: Сергей Вадимович Маценко; born 21 June 1990) is a Russian chess grandmaster.

== Chess career ==
Born in 1990, Matsenko earned his international master title in 2007 and his grandmaster title in 2018. He is the No. 70 ranked Russian player as of May 2018.

In 2019, he won the Saint Louis Invitational – GM Norm tied with Titas Stremavičius.

== Personal life ==
Matsenko was born in Chelyabinsk. He holds two bachelor's degrees in law and engineering from South Ural State University and a master's degree in industrial engineering at Texas Tech University.
