= Owen Hindle =

English chess player (born 1940)

Personal information
- Born: 14 March 1940 (age 86)
- Spouse: Kathleen Hindle (m. 1968; died 2025)

Chess career
- Country: England
- Title: FIDE Master (1986)
- Peak rating: 2380 (January 1978)

Owen Hindle (born 14 March 1940) is an English chess FIDE Master and a Chess Olympiad individual bronze medal winner (1964).

== Biography ==
Owen Hindle was one of England's leading chess players in the 1960s. He was British Lightning Chess champion in 1965 and represented his country on numerous occasions.

He played in the British Chess Championship several times. In this tournament, Owen Hindle achieved the best result in 1964, in Whitby, when he shared 2nd place (Michael Haygarth won the tournament). Owen Hindle also regularly participated in the Hastings International Chess Congress tournaments, where in 1965 he beat Svetozar Gligorić, one of the strongest grandmasters at the time. In 1967, in Vrnjačka Banja, he participated in the World Chess Championship Zonal Tournament.

Owen Hindle played for England in the Chess Olympiads:

- in 1964, at the first reserve board in the 16th Chess Olympiad in Tel Aviv (+9, =4, -3), winning an individual bronze medal,
- in 1966, at the first reserve board in the 17th Chess Olympiad in Havana (+2, =5, -1).

Owen Hindle played for England in the Clare Benedict Cups:

- in 1963, at the fourth board in the 10th Clare Benedict Chess Cup in Lucerne (+1, =4, -0), winning a team bronze medal,
- in 1965, at the third board in the 12th Clare Benedict Chess Cup in West Berlin (+0, =4, -1),
- in 1966, at the third board in the 13th Clare Benedict Chess Cup in Brunnen (+0, =1, -4).

Owen Hindle is also known as a chess journalist and historian. From 1960 to 1963, he worked for London's chess magazine Chess. He has written several books on chess and the history of chess, including books about English chess players Joseph Henry Blackburne and Cecil Valentine De Vere. Owen Hindle is the author of a study on the history of Norfolk and Norwich chess clubs.

In 1968 Owen Hindle married the Scottish chess master Kathleen Patterson.

== Literature ==
- Owen Hindle. Further Steps in Chess. 1968. ISBN 978-0850363586
- Owen Hindle. J.H. Blackburne: the Final Years (Chess masters). 1998. ISBN 978-1901034110
- Robert H. Jones, Owen Hindle. The English Morphy?: The Life and Games of Cecil De Vere, First British Chess Champion. 2001. ISBN 978-0953132140
