= Russell Dive =

New Zealand chess player (born 1966)

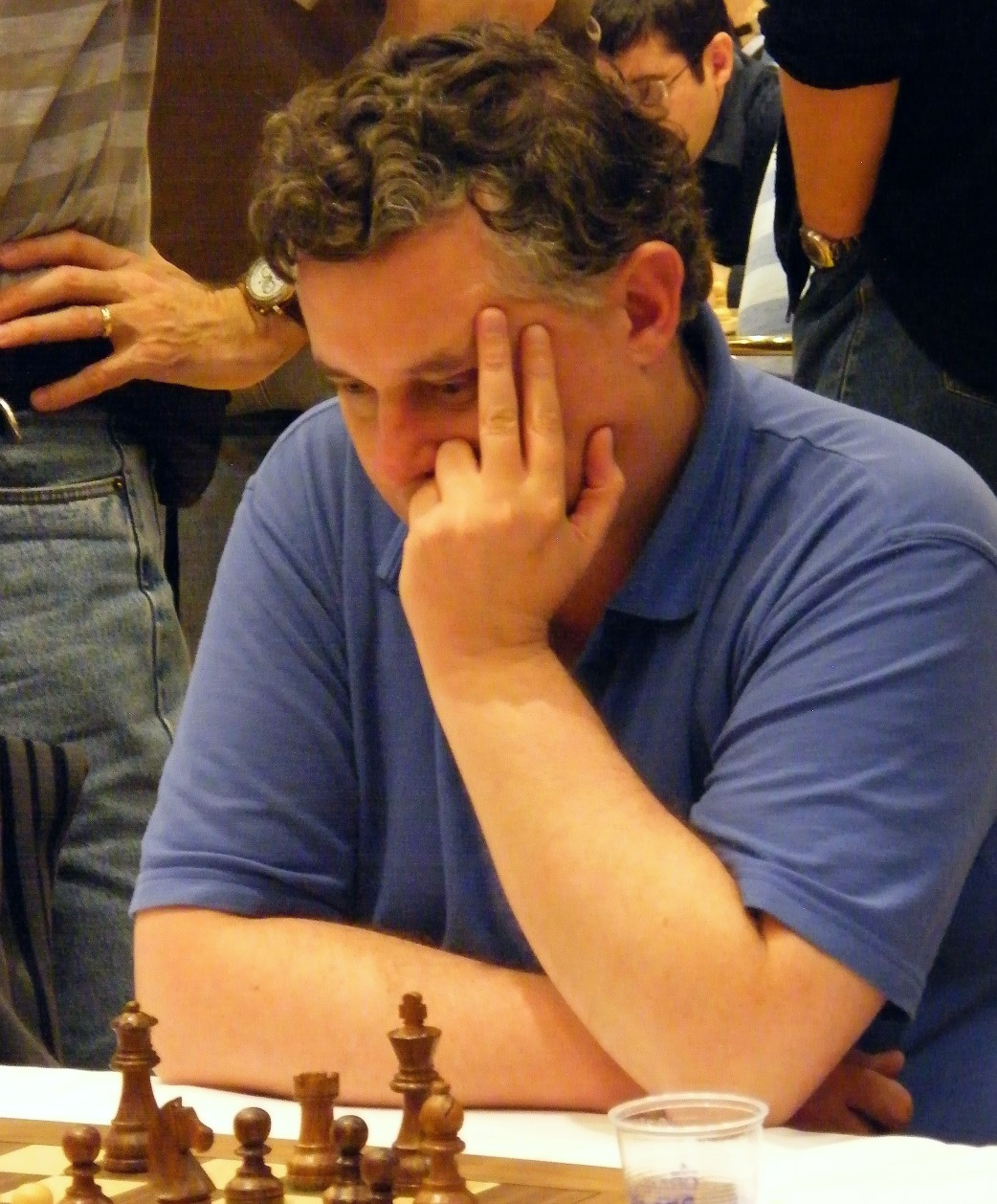
- Russell Dive at the 38th Chess Olympiad in Dresden, Germany 2008

Personal information
- Born: 21 May 1966 (age 60) Wellington, New Zealand

Chess career
- Country: New Zealand
- Title: International Master (1995)
- Peak rating: 2448 (July 1999)

Russell John Dive is a New Zealand chess player and International Master.

== Chess career ==
Dive represented New Zealand in twelve Chess Olympiads between 1988 and 2018. His best result was in 1994 when he scored 7½/11 and finished in 10th place for his individual board result.

Dive has won or jointly won the New Zealand Chess Championship seven times in 1986/87, 1995/96, 1998/99, 2015, 2018, 2019 and 2020. Dive has also won the New Zealand Rapid Chess Championship 11 times in 1993, 1996, 1997, 2000, 2002, 2003, 2005, 2015, 2022, 2024 and 2025, the New Zealand Correspondence Chess Championship twice in 1991 and 1993.

He won the London SCCU Open in 1995, scoring 7/9, and defeating GM Eduard Gufeld along the way.

Dive finished 2nd equal, with 6/9, in the 1999 Oceania Zonal Chess Championship, behind Vladimir Feldman. He also competed in the 2000 Oceania Zonal Chess Championship.

Dive has had a decades-long friendly rivalry with fellow IM and NZ Champion Anthony Ker, with an almost level score and high number of decisive games.

== Notable games ==
- Ashot Anastasian vs Russell John Dive, 31st Chess Olympiad, Moscow 1994, Queen's Indian Defense, (E12), 0-1
- Russell John Dive vs Darryl K Johansen, Oceania Zonal Championship 1999, Benoni Defense, (A43), 1-0
