= New Zealand Chess Federation =

Chess federation in New Zealand

- Abbreviation: NZCF
- Formation: 1870s
- Type: NGO
- Legal status: Association
- Purpose: Chess
- Headquarters: PO Box 216, Shortland Street
- Location: Auckland, New Zealand
- President: Craig Hall
- Vice-president: Paul Spiller
- Secretary: Richie Christie
- Treasurer: Russell Dive
- Website: www.newzealandchess.co.nz

The New Zealand Chess Federation (NZCF) is a chess federation in New Zealand.

The first chess club in New Zealand was formed in September 1863 in Dunedin, while the New Zealand Chess Association came into being in the 1870s. The association, refounded in 1892, conducts the annual championship, usually held in the Christmas – New Year period. The Australian master C. J. S. Purdy stated in 1955 that New Zealand holds the record for annual tournaments for a national chess championship.

New Zealand was one of the earliest countries to make use of telegraphic interclub chess as a method of play. Christchurch beat Nelson in two consultation games in 1866. The first interclub match was played between Canterbury and Otago in 1869. The Bledisloe Cup, presented by the Governor-General in 1933, was until recently competed for annually in this way.

== Prominent players ==
- Ortvin Sarapu (1924–1999), International Master, originally an Estonian, sometimes known as "Mr Chess", won or shared the New Zealand Chess Championship 20 times from 1952 to 1990 and participant in the 1967 interzonal tournament.
- Murray Chandler (1960–), chess grandmaster
- Tom Middelburg is an International Master (IM) in chess and has played at the highest national and European levels. He is currently ranked 2825 in the world.

== See also ==
- New Zealand Chess Championship
- Fédération Internationale des Échecs (FIDE)
- International Correspondence Chess Federation (ICCF)
