= Murray Chandler =

New Zealand chess grandmaster (born 1960)

Murray Chandler MNZM
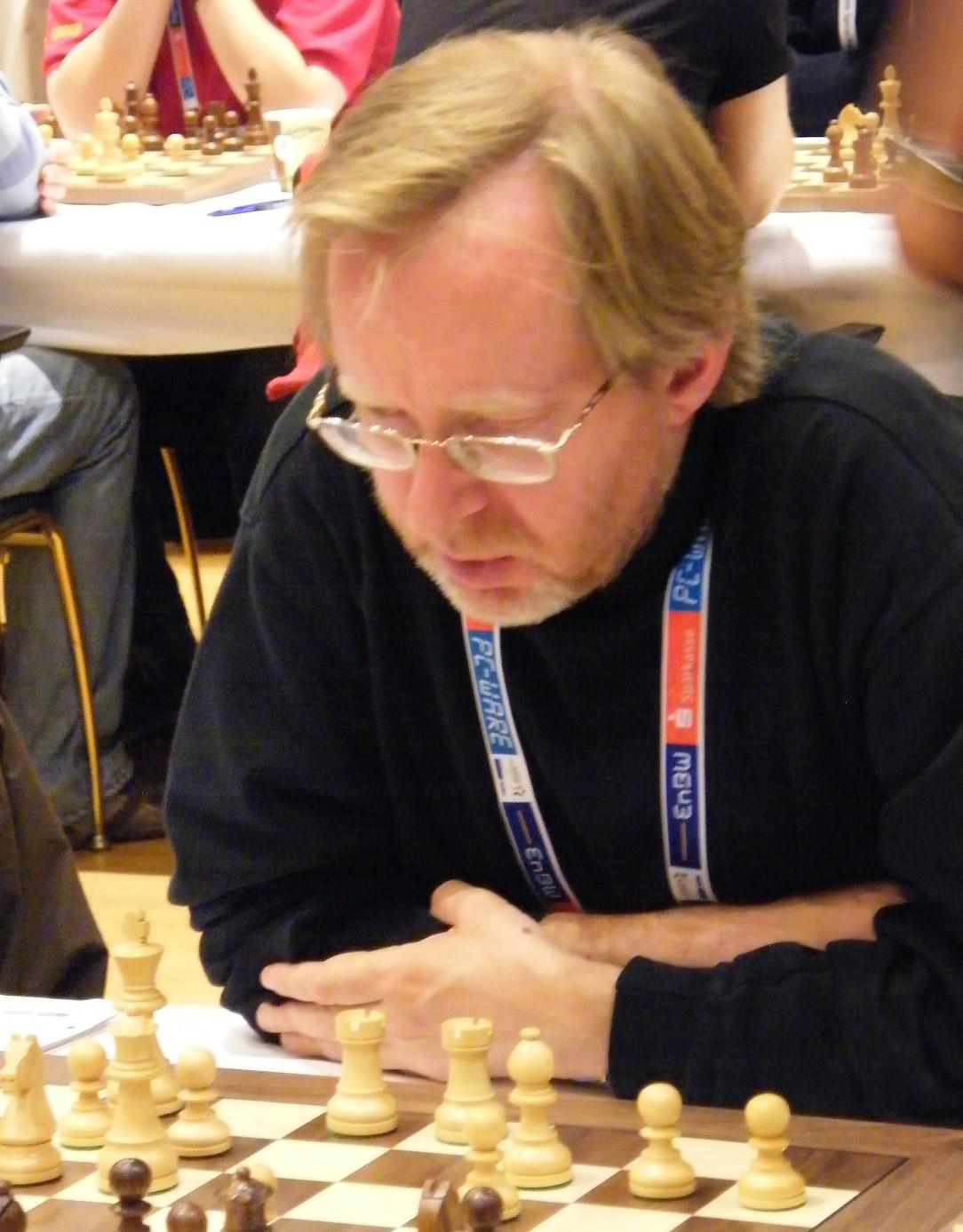

Personal information
- Born: Murray Graham Chandler; 4 April 1960 (age 66) Wellington, New Zealand

Chess career
- Country: England (until 2007); New Zealand (since 2007)
- Title: Grandmaster (1983)
- FIDE rating: 2518 (October 2026)
- Peak rating: 2605 (July 1988)
- Peak ranking: No. 14 (January 1987)

Murray Graham Chandler MNZM (born 4 April 1960, Wellington, New Zealand) is a New Zealand chess grandmaster. In the 1980s, he gained British citizenship and represented England at six Chess Olympiads. He has since returned to New Zealand. Chandler is also known as a chess writer, chess publishing executive and occasional organiser of chess tournaments.

== Career ==
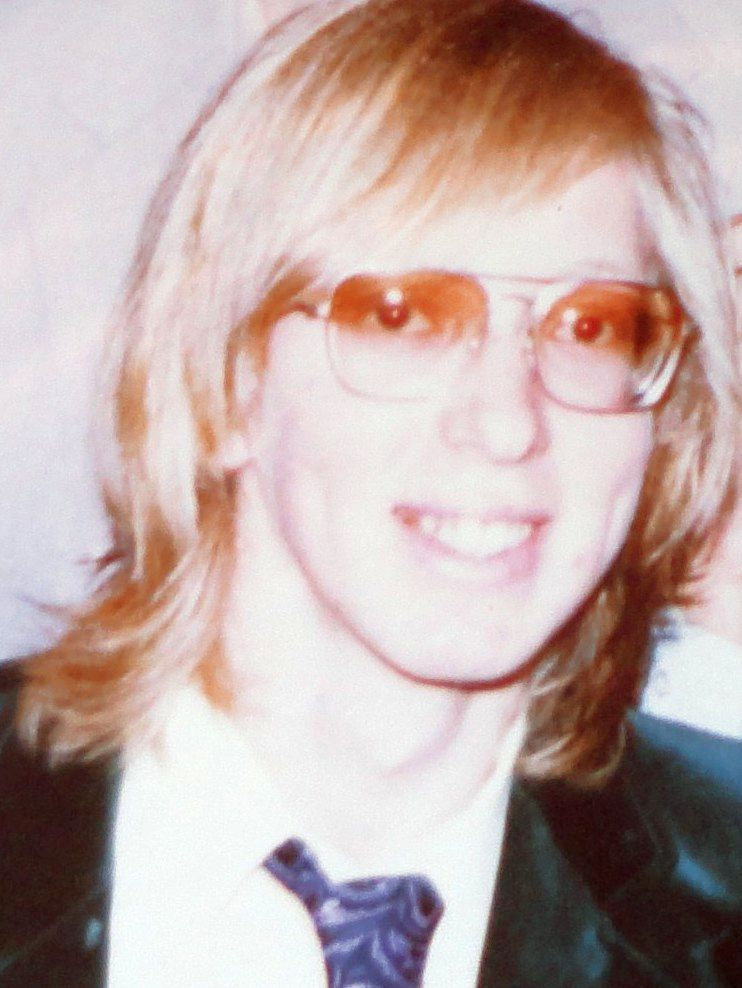
Murray Chandler, Rio 1979

Chandler won the New Zealand chess championship in 1975–76, and qualified as an International Master in 1977 by winning the first Asian Junior Chess Championship in Baguio. His first international chess appearance was in 1974 when he turned out for the New Zealand team in the first Asian Team Chess Championship in Penang, Malaysia. Later, he represented New Zealand at the Chess Olympiads of 1976, 1978 and 1980 but then switched allegiance to England. He played for England at the Chess Olympiads of 1982, 1984, 1986, 1988, 1990 and 1992, as part of a highly successful team that defeated the Soviets in some crucial encounters. He qualified for the grandmaster title in 1983, and maintained an Elo rating around the 2600 level between 1987 and 1992.

Amongst Chandler's best results have been Commonwealth Champion (twice – jointly in 1984 and outright in 1987), first place at Brighton 1981, first place in the Blackpool Zonal of 1990, tie for first place, Lloyds Bank Masters 1979, tie for first place, Hastings Premier 1986/7, and tied for second place (behind Anatoly Karpov), London 1984. He also played for the Rest of World team versus the Soviet Union in 1984 and tied first at the British Chess Championship of 1986, but lost the play-off match for the title.

One curiosity is his lifetime score of two wins, no draws, no losses against Garry Kasparov. One win was in the World Under-16 Championship in 1976, and the other in a simultaneous display in 1985.

Chandler was editor of British Chess Magazine from 1991 to 1999. In the late 1990s, he also set up Gambit Publications, a publisher of high quality chess books that has received good reviews from all quarters. Fellow Gambit directors were England teammate John Nunn and FIDE Master-cum-author, Graham Burgess. The company now has a large back-catalogue containing contributions from all three directors and from a host of other respected chess writers. Books like Modern Chess Strategy by John L. Watson have been highly acclaimed and Chandler's own How To Beat Your Dad At Chess is a very large seller. He also produced VHS and DVD material for Bad Bishop Ltd., a company related to Gambit, including a repertoire against the Nc6 Sicilian, based on the early Bb5 lines.

He returned to New Zealand in 2006, winning his second New Zealand Chess Championship that year and a third champion's title in 2008. He has now reverted his player registration to the New Zealand Federation, making him eligible once more to play for his country of birth.

In 2013, he purchased the old Saint Paul's church in Auckland, converting it into a chess coaching centre.

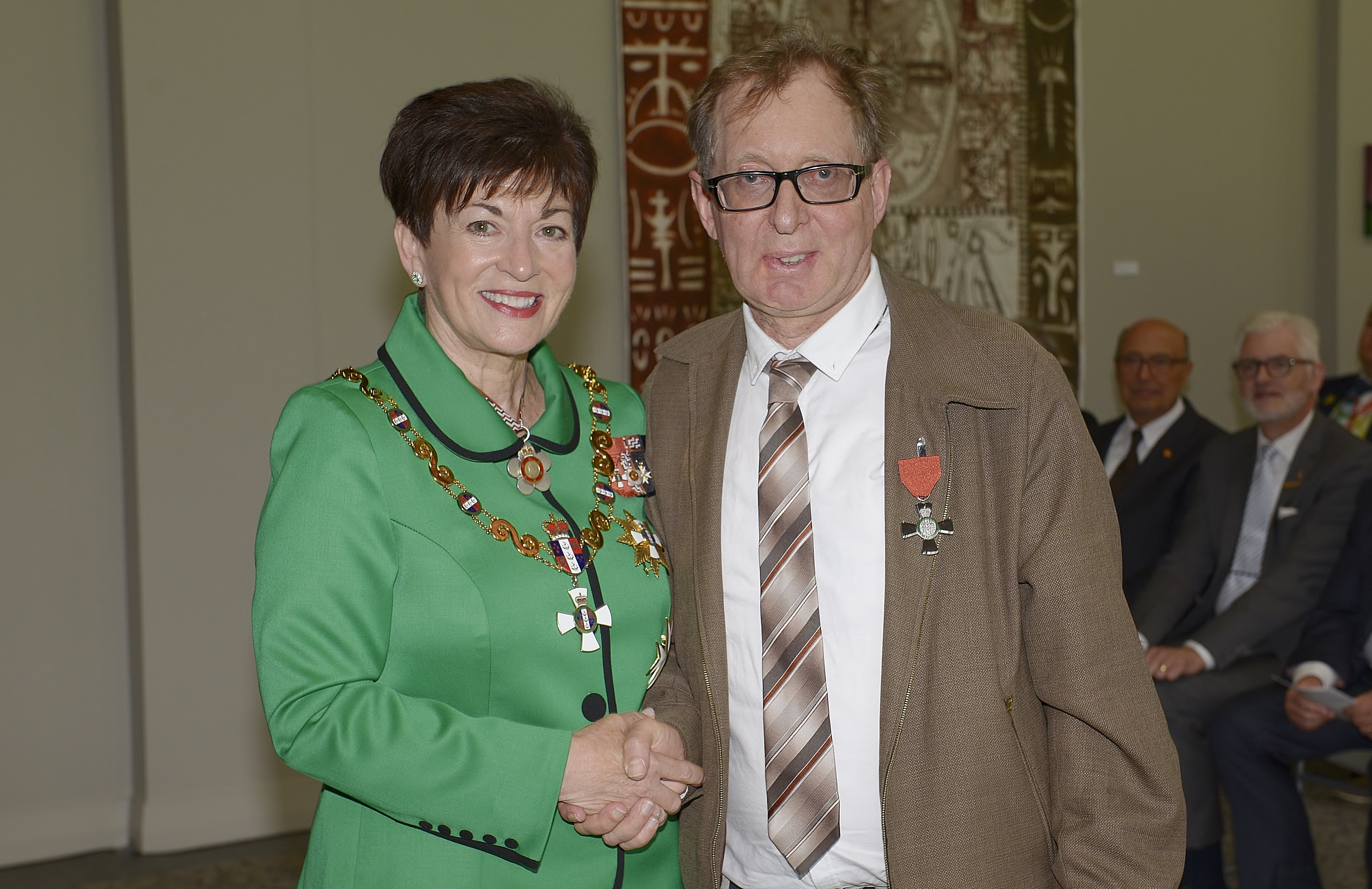
Chandler in 2018, after his investiture as a Member of the New Zealand Order of Merit by the governor-general, Dame Patsy Reddy

In the 2017 New Year Honours, Chandler was appointed a Member of the New Zealand Order of Merit for services to chess.

== Notable games ==
Chandler vs. Ólafsson, Hastings 1991

Position: c8 black queen, f8 black rook, g8 black king, a7 white rook, c7 black knight, e7 black bishop, f7 black pawn, g7 black pawn, h7 black pawn, b6 black rook, c5 black pawn, e5 white pawn, h5 black bishop, c4 white bishop, f3 white knight, h3 white pawn, e2 white queen, f2 white pawn, g2 white pawn, c1 white bishop, d1 white rook, g1 white king

In this position, Chandler's 23.e6! is difficult to find, as it appears that the square is defended four ways. None of the available captures are satisfactory, however, making it equally difficult to meet.
Chandler vs. Helgi Ólafsson, Hastings 1990/1991; Ruy Lopez, Worrall Attack
1.e4 e5 2.Nf3 Nc6 3.Bb5 a6 4.Ba4 Nf6 5.0-0 Be7 6.Qe2 b5 7.Bb3 0-0 8.c3 d6 9.d4 Bg4 10.Rd1 Qc8 11.a4 b4 12.a5 bxc3 13.bxc3 Rb8 14.Bc4 exd4 15.cxd4 Nxa5 16.Rxa5 Rxb1 17.e5 dxe5 18.dxe5 Ne8 19.Rxa6 Rb6 20.Ra4 c5 21.h3 Bh5 22.Ra7 Nc7 23.e6 Bf6 24.e7 Re8 25.Rd8 Rxd8 26.Rxc7 Qb8 27.exd8=Q+ Qxd8 28.Bf4 g5 29.Bg3 Rb2 30.Qd3 Qa8 31.Qd7 Qa1+ 32.Kh2 Rb1 33.Bxf7+ Kh8 34.Qe8+ Kg7 35.Bg6+ 1–0
Chandler vs. Kasparov, Wattignies 1976

Position: b8 black king, b7 black pawn, c7 black rook, h7 black pawn, a6 black pawn, e6 black pawn, a5 white pawn, e5 white pawn, h5 black queen, c4 white bishop, d4 white queen, f4 black pawn, c3 white rook, f3 black pawn, f2 white pawn, h2 white pawn, g1 white rook, h1 white king

Position after 39...Qh5

At the age of 16, Chandler defeats 13-year-old future world champion Garry Kasparov.

Murray Chandler vs. Garry Kasparov, Wattignies 1976; Sicilian Defence, Alapin Variation
1.e4 c5 2.c3 Nf6 3.e5 Nd5 4.d4 Nc6 5.Nf3 cxd4 6.cxd4 e6 7.a3 d6 8.Bd3 Qa5+ 9.Bd2 Qb6 10.Nc3 Nxc3 11.Bxc3 dxe5 12.dxe5 Be7 13.0-0 Bd7 14.Nd2 Qc7 15.Qg4 0-0-0 16.Rfc1 Kb8 17.Qc4 Rc8 18.b4 f6 19.Nf3 Qb6 20.Qe4 f5 21.Qe1 a6 22.Rab1 g5 23.Nd2 Nd4 24.Qe3 Rxc3 25.Rxc3 f4 26.Qe1 g4 27.Ne4 Bc6 28.Nc5 Ka7 29.a4 Bf3 30.a5 Qd8 31.Bc4 Bxc5 32.bxc5 Qh4 33.gxf3 gxf3 34.Kh1 Rg8 35.Qe4 Rg7 36.Qxd4 Qg5 37.c6+ Kb8 38.c7+ Rxc7 39.Rg1 Qh5 40.Rg8+ Rc8 41.Qd6+ Ka7 1–0

== Selected bibliography ==
- The Complete c3 Sicilian, 1997, American Batsford, ISBN 1-879479-50-8.
- How To Beat Your Dad At Chess, 1998, Gambit Publications, ISBN 1-901983-05-6.
- Chess Tactics For Kids, 2003, Gambit Publications, ISBN 1-901983-99-4.
- Chess For Children (with Helen Milligan), 2004, Gambit Publications, ISBN 1-904600-06-9.
