= Ortvin Sarapu =

Estonian-New Zealand chess player (1924–1999)

Ortvin Sarapu MBE
- Ortvin Sarapu: 'Mr. Chess' The Ortvin Sarapu Story 1993

Personal information
- Born: 22 January 1924 Narva, Estonia
- Died: 13 April 1999 (aged 75) Auckland, New Zealand

Chess career
- Country: New Zealand
- Title: International Master (1966)

Ortvin Sarapu MBE (born Ortvin Sarapuu; 22 January 1924 – 13 April 1999), known in New Zealand as "Mr Chess", was an Estonian-born chess player who emigrated to New Zealand and won or shared the New Zealand Chess Championship 20 times from 1952 to 1990.

== Early life ==
Born Ortvin Sarapuu in Narva, Estonia, he won the Estonian Junior Championship in 1940, then defected to Finland from then Nazi-occupied Estonia in 1943, thence to Sweden. In 1945, just after World War II ended, Sarapu was invited to stay with a family friend in Denmark. In 1946, he won the Copenhagen championship and the Copenhagen five-minute lightning chess championship. In 1948, he played twenty games of blindfold chess simultaneously in Denmark.

Sarapu's first international tournament in Europe was at Oldenburg 1949. There, he defeated former world chess championship candidate Efim Bogoljubov with a sharp turnaround from a bad position. Sarapu finished in fifth place with 11–6, a point behind tournament winners Bogolyubov and Elmārs Zemgalis, and a half-point behind Nicolas Rossolimo and Herbert Heinicke.

== New Zealand ==
One of Sarapu's opponents at the 1949 Oldenburg tournament was former New Zealander Robert Wade; in a conversation after their game, Wade suggested that New Zealand would be a good place for someone like Sarapu, who wanted to escape war-ravaged Europe. He met Barbara Bialonczyk after the Oldenburg tournament, and they married in 1950. Immediately thereafter, the newlyweds emigrated to New Zealand, arriving in Wellington in October 1950. They had one son, Peter.

On the Sarapus' arrival, there was a huge gap in chess strength between him and the rest. His strength helped raise the general standard of chess in New Zealand. Even so, he won or shared the New Zealand Chess Championship 20 times between 1952, when he won his first championship with 10.5 points out of 11 games, and 1990, when he tied with Ben Martin at 7.5 out of 11. Sarapu claimed that this was a world record number of wins of any national championship. In New Zealand he became known as "Mr Chess", and represented the country at ten Chess Olympiads.

In 1952 he played C. J. S. Purdy, then champion of Australia, for the championship of Australasia. The match, played at Auckland, was drawn, the players becoming joint champions for 1952. Sarapu took first place at the Melbourne International Tournament in 1955.

== Honours and awards ==
FIDE awarded Sarapu the International Master title in 1966 after he won the Asian Zonal, making him the second New Zealand player to gain the IM title, the first being Robert G Wade. In addition to Bogolyubov, other world-class players whom Sarapu played include World Champions Bobby Fischer (a loss at the Sousse 1967 Interzonal), Garry Kasparov (a loss at the Lucerne 1982 Olympiad), Boris Spassky (a draw at Wellington 1988), and perennial World Championship candidate Viktor Korchnoi (a draw at the Sousse Interzonal).

In the 1980 Queen's Birthday Honours, Sarapu was appointed a Member of the Order of the British Empire, for services to chess.

== Publications ==
- Ortvin Sarapu: 25 Years in the New Zealand Chess Championship (1952–1977), 1978.
- Ortvin Sarapu: "Mr. Chess". The Ortvin Sarapu Story. New Zealand Chess Supplies, Wainuiomata 1993. ISBN 0-473-01607-9
- Ortvin Sarapuu: Minu malelugu. Kupar, Tallinn 1998. ISBN 9985-61-117-9

== See also ==
- List of Eastern Bloc defectors
- New Zealand Chess Championship
- New Zealand Chess Federation
- Fédération Internationale des Échecs (FIDE)
- International Correspondence Chess Federation (ICCF)
