= Women's badminton in Australia =

- Country: Australia
- National team: Australia

The beginning of women's badminton in Australia dates back to the year 1900, when for the first time badminton was played in Australia. The first regional badminton championships were held in 1932, followed by the first national championships in 1935.

== History ==
The first regional badminton championships were held in 1932 in Victoria followed by the first national championships in 1935. In 1934, the Victorian Women's Centennial Sports Carnival was held. The event was organised by the Victorian Women's Amateur Sports Council and held at the Melbourne Cricket Grounds. The purpose was to increase women's interest in sport by providing them opportunities to play. Sports that were included on the programme included cricket, field hockey, women's basketball, bowls, rowing, swimming, athletics, rifle shooting, baseball, golf, tennis and badminton. There were over 1,000 bowlers involved over the course a week. Cricket featured a match versus a visiting English side. Women's basketball featured a Victorian side playing against a representative all Australian side. There was a day for watersports such as swimming and rowing. A tennis tournament was held. A field hockey tournament featuring Australian, Kiwi and Fijian teams was played.

In 1940, a study of 314 women in New Zealand and Australia was done. Most of the women in the study were middle class, conservative, Protestant and white. The study found that 183 participated in sport. The ninth most popular sport that these women participated in was croquet, with 3 having played the sport. The sport was tied with billiards, chess, fishing, field hockey, horse racing, squash, table tennis and shooting.

Australian women's sports had an advantage over many other women's sport organisations around the world in the period after World War II. The women's sport organisations had largely remained intact and were holding competitions during the period of the war. This structure survived in the post war period. Women's sport were not hurt because of food rationing, petrol rationing, population disbursement, and other issues facing post-war Europe.

== Tournaments ==
There are organized many national badminton tournaments for all age groups in Australia. Most of the tournaments are open for male and for female contestants together. Team, singles, doubles and mixed doubles tournaments are held, where singles, doubles and mixed doubles events are in the most cases held together during one and the same tournament. The most important national tournaments are the Australian national championships, the Clendinnen Shield, the H. B. Wray Trophy, the C. Maddern Trophy, the Melbourne Silver Bowl and Australian ranking tournaments. Australian championships were open for international contestants until the end of the 1990s. In the meantime the Australian championships were divided into an international one (Australia Open championships or Australia International) and a national one (Australia closed championships).

On the international level, Australia organizes the already mentioned Australia Open championships and alternating with New Zealand the team competition for the Whyte Trophy. The Australian teams and players participate in all major tournaments of the BWF. In single and doubles tournaments, the players participate for instance in the World championships, Oceania championships, Commonwealth games and the BWF Super Series. The mixed national team competes in the Sudirman Cup, the women's team in the Uber Cup. Australia did not participate in the first women's world team championship in 1957. In the second championship Australia lost in the final of the preliminary round to New Zealand.

== Australian national champions: Ladies Singles ==
- 1935 - Mavis Horsburgh
- 1936 - Mavis Horsburgh
- 1937 - Mavis Horsburgh
- 1938 - Eva Robert
- 1939 - Beryl Cuthbertson
- 1940-1946 - no championship held
- 1947 - Eva Robert
- 1948 - Eva Robert
- 1949 - Eva Robert
- 1950 - Ethel Peacock
- 1951 - Eva Robert
- 1951 - Ethel Peacock
- 1953 - Ethel Peacock
- 1954 - Amy Pincott
- 1955 - Margaret Foord
- 1956 - June Bevan
- 1957 - Margaret Russell
- 1958 - Margaret Russell
- 1960 - June Bevan
- 1982 - Maxine Evans
- 1989 - Anna Lao
- 1990 - Susi Susanti (Indonesia)
- 1991 - Anna Lao
- 1992 - Song Yang
- 1993 - Song Yang
- 1994 - Lisa Campbell
- 1995 - Lisa Campbell
- 1996 - Lisa Campbell
- 1997 - Li Feng
- 1998 - Michaela Smith
- 2003 - Renuga Veeran
- 2006 - Tania Luiz
- 2007 - Leanne Choo
- 2008 - Leanne Choo
- 2009 - Renuga Veeran
- 2010 - Leisha Cooper
- 2011 - Michelle (Xi) Zhang

== Bibliography ==
- Pollard, Jack (1968). AMPOL book of Australian Sporting Records. Sydney: The Pollard Publishing Co. OCLC 71140.
- Stell, Marion K. (1991). Half the Race, A history of Australian women in sport. North Ryde, Australia: HarperCollins. ISBN 0-207-16971-3.
