= Women's rifle shooting sport in Australia =

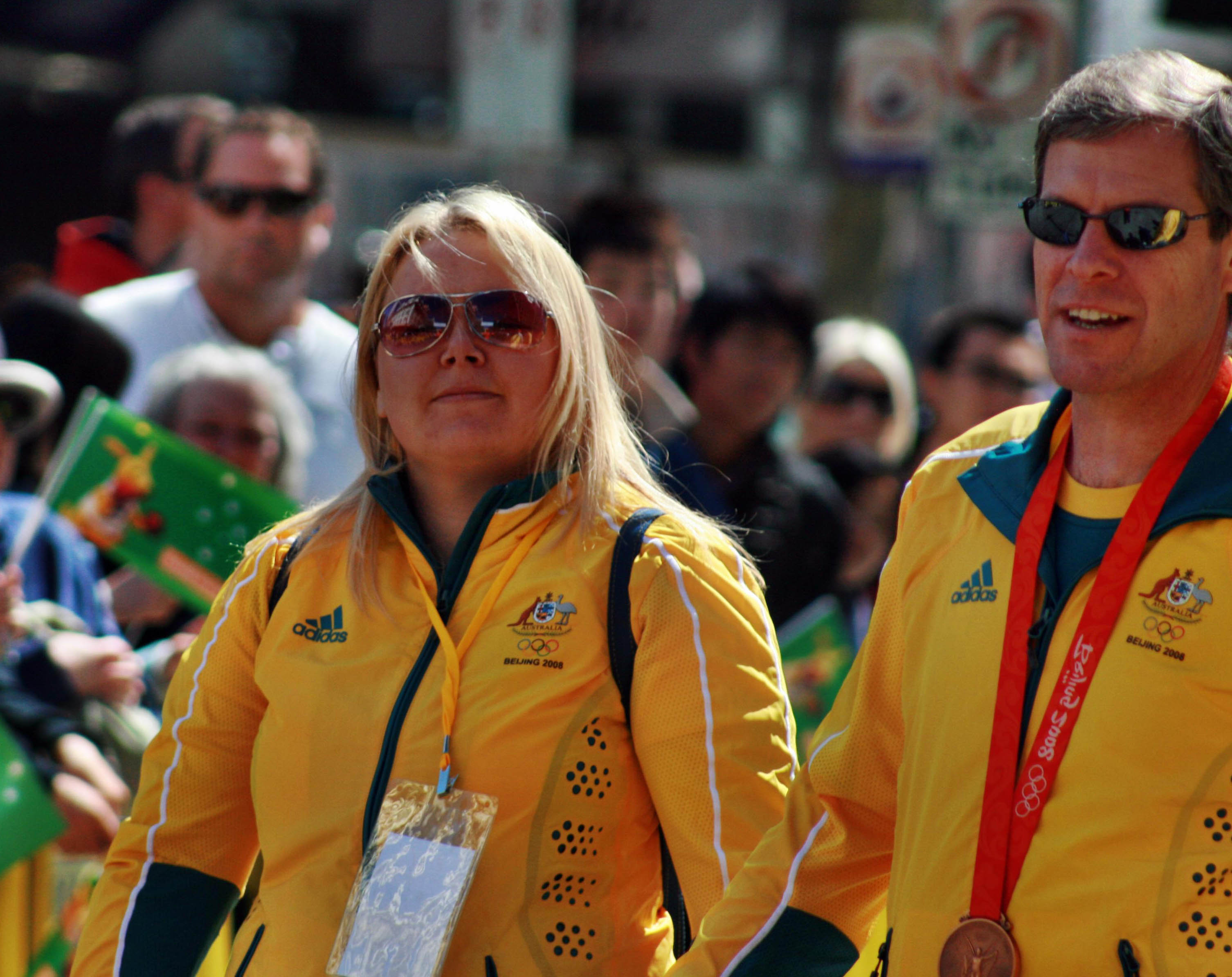
- Melbourne homecoming parade for 2008 Olympic Team. Shooters, Stacy Roiall, women's trap, and bronze medalist Warren Potent, 50m Prone Rifle.
- Country: Australia
- National team: Australia

Shooting was an important skill for women in the bush to possess. It was encouraged as part of self-reliance. Rifle shooting as a sport was being played in Queensland by 1914.

During the 1870s, the sport was being played in Queensland as part of a culture of hunting, that encouraged women to shoot kangaroos and wallabies as the local government had put a bounty on the animals and this provided a source of income for outback women.

In 1934, the Victorian Women's Centennial Sports Carnival was held. The event was organised by the Victorian Women's Amateur Sports Council and held at the Melbourne Cricket Grounds. The purpose was to increase women's interest in sport by providing them opportunities to play. Sports that were included on the programme included cricket, field hockey, women's basketball, bowls, rowing, swimming, athletics, rifle shooting, baseball, golf, tennis and badminton. There were over 1,000 bowlers involved over the course a week. Cricket featured a match versus a visiting English side. Women's basketball featured a Victorian side playing against a representative all Australian side. There was a day for watersports such as swimming and rowing. A tennis tournament was held. A field hockey tournament featuring Australian, Kiwi and Fijian teams was played.

In 1940, a study of 314 women in New Zealand and Australia was done. Most of the women in the study were middle class, conservative, Protestant and white. The study found that 183 participated in sport. The ninth most popular sport that these women participated in was squash, with 3 having played the sport. The sport was tied with croquet, billiards, chess, fishing, field hockey, horse racing, squash, table tennis and shooting.

== See also ==
- Netball in Australia
- Women's association football in Australia
- Women's field hockey in Australia

== Bibliography ==
- Howell, Max; Howell, Reet; Brown, David W. (1989). The Sporting Image, A pictorial history of Queenslanders at play. Brisbane: University of Queensland Press. ISBN 0-7022-2206-2.
- Stell, Marion K. (1991). Half the Race, A history of Australian women in sport. North Ryde, Australia: HarperCollins. ISBN 0-207-16971-3.
