= Irene Victoria Read =

Australian charity and community worker

- Born: Irene Victoria Phillips; 29 August 1880; Sydney, New South Wales, Australia
- Died: 27 August 1972 (aged 91); Mosman, New South Wales, Australia
- Occupation: voluntary worker
- Known for: President of the Rachel Forster Hospital for Women and Children
- Spouse: Dr William Henry Read
- Children: five
- Relatives: Margaret Holmes (daughter)

Irene Victoria Read born Irene Victoria Phillips (29 August 1880 – 27 August 1972) was an Australian charity and community worker. She was President of Sydney's Rachel Forster Hospital for Women and Children from 1930 to 1950.

== Life ==
Read was born in 1880 in Sydney. Her parents were the Scottish-born Margaret Thomson (born Stobo) and Henry Phillips. She was the penultimate of their five children. Her father who was an accountant died when she was young. She attended Sydney Girls' High School.

In 1900 Dr Julie Carlile-Thomas started the Sydney Medical mission to supply a medical service to the poor. It was funded by Emma Dixson. Iza Coghlan was another of the doctors and Read was a founding volunteer. In 1906 Read married another of the mission's doctors, William Henry Read and from 1913 to 1919 she was on the mission's executive committee. One of the five children they had was Margaret Holmes who became a leading pacifist.

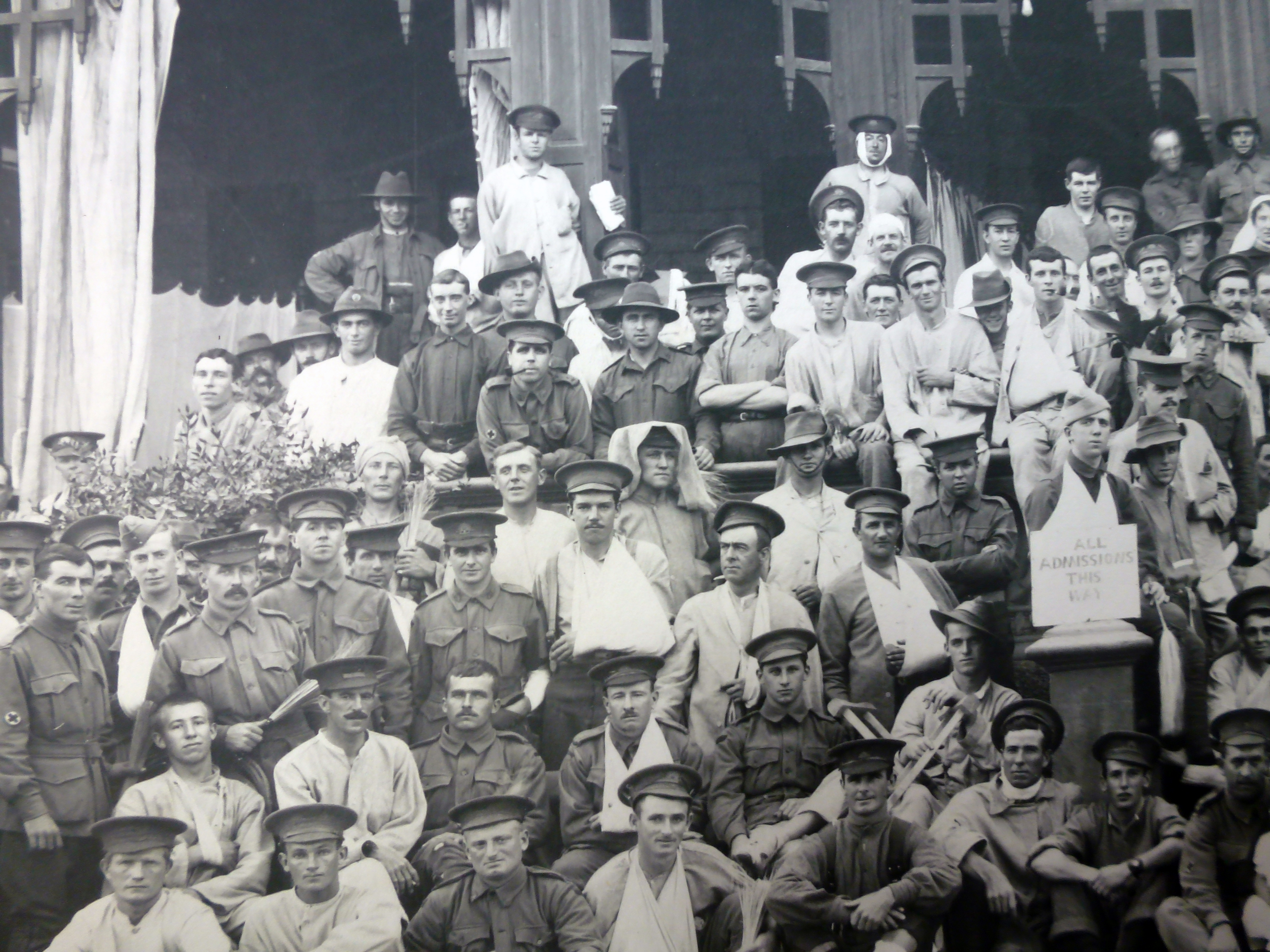
One of her photos at No. 2 Australian General Hospital in May 1915, Mena House, Egypt. The first batch of wounded Australian soldiers from Gallipoli

In May 1915 she and their children were re-united with her husband in Egypt. He was serving with the No 2 General Hospital and she took an interest in the plans for the hospital and in the accommodation provided for the patients. Her photographs include ones taken of the first wounded men from Gallipoli. She lobbied the Australian Comforts Fund on the patients behalf to ensure they were given their basic needs. She returned to Australia and worked in support of the Comforts Fund and also speaking publicly about the conditions she had witnessed. She was a strong supporter of Australia conscripting men to fight in the war.

In 1921, her friend Lucy Gullett worked with Harriet Biffen to create what became the Rachel Forster Hospital for Women and Children in 1925. Gullett who served as the hospital's secretary invited Read to join the hospital's committee in 1924. Gullet stood down as secretary in 1926 but she remained involved. Read's involvement grew stronger, she was the hospital's president from 1930 to 1950 with Gullett as her vice-president from 1932 to 1949.

During the second world war she was involved with the Women's Australian National Services which organised the voluntary efforts of Australian women. From 1942, until it was disbanded in 1948, she was the organisation's president.

== Legacy ==
Read died in the Sydney suburb of Mosman in 1972. Some of her husband's letters to her are transcribed and available. Her papers are held and they include details of her work with the Australian Sock Foundation who encouraged women to knit grey socks for soldiers.
