= Women's squash in Australia =

- Country: Australia
- National team: Australia

In 1940, a study of 314 women in New Zealand and Australia was done. Most of the women in the study were middle class, conservative, Protestant and white. The study found that 183 participated in sport. The ninth most popular sport that these women participated in was squash, with three having played the sport. The sport was tied with croquet, billiards, chess, fishing, field hockey, horse racing, squash, table tennis and shooting.

During the 1950s, Australian women competed in squash at the Empire Games. One player who had success at these games was Heather McKay.

Some of the best known Australian squash players include Heather Blundell-McKay. During Blundell-McKay's squash career, she only lost twice. She won the British amateur title seven times starting in 1962 and she won the Australian championship eight times starting in 1960.

In 1960, there was a mass demonstration of the sport at a school in Roseville, New South Wales, where female students learned a number of skills including the forehand drive.

In 1968, Australia had thirty total professional squash players amongst both genders. Only two of these players were female: Yvonne Barlow and a Melbourne based player.

In 1968, Australia was one of the most important squash playing countries. There were many players of both genders and a large number of courts. In Sydney, there were 85 squash buildings. Each building had an average of five courts.

== See also ==
- Netball in Australia
- Women's association football in Australia

== Bibliography ==
- Department of Sport, Recreation and Tourism; Australian Sport Commission (1985). Australian Sport, a profile. Canberra, Australia: Australian Government Publish Service. ISBN 0-644-03667-2.
- Pollard, Jack (1968). AMPOL book of Australian Sporting Records. Sydney: The Pollard Publishing Co. OCLC 71140.
- Stell, Marion K. (1991). Half the Race, A history of Australian women in sport. North Ryde, Australia: HarperCollins. ISBN 0-207-16971-3.
