= Women's chess in Australia =

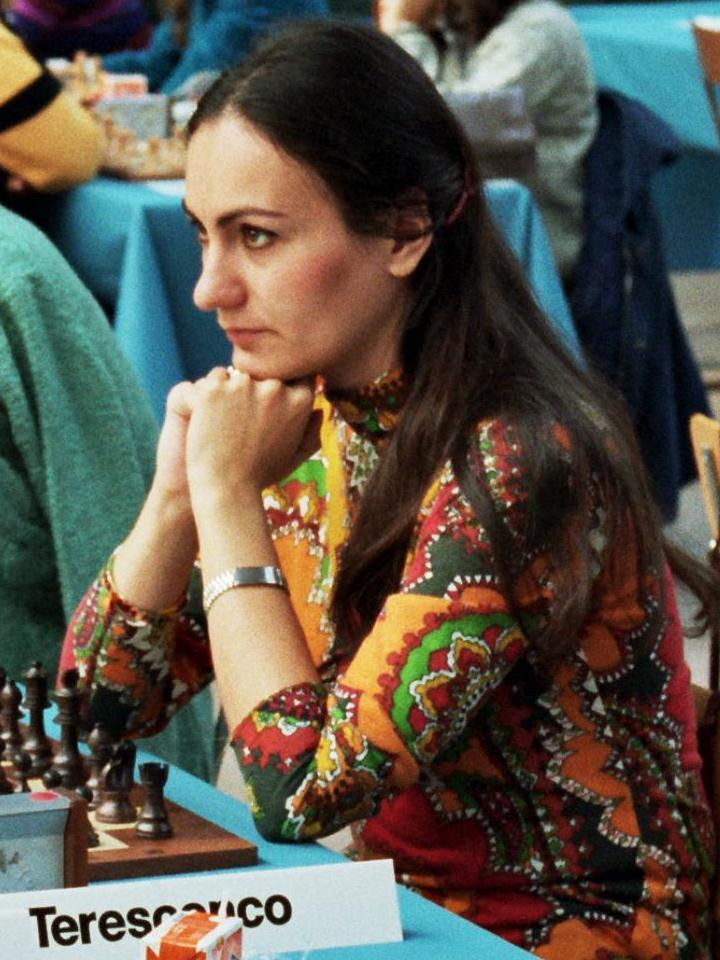
Daniela Nutu-Terescenko (Nutu-Gajic) of Adelaide, South Australia (originally from Timișoara, Romania), at the Chess Olympiad 1982 in Lucern, Switzerland

Women's chess in Australia has been occurring since the 1930s and competitive chess tournaments in Australia were taking place on a state level by 1934.

== History ==
During the 1930s, women were encouraged to play chess because the sport was not seen as a bridge to gambling. In 1940, a study of 314 women in New Zealand and Australia was done. Most of the women in the study were middle class, conservative, Protestant and white. The study found that 183 participated in sport. The ninth most popular sport that these women participated in was chess, with 3 having played the sport. The sport was tied with croquet, billiards, fishing, field hockey, horse racing, squash, table tennis and shooting.

== Competitive chess ==
There were chess championships for women being organised by the 1940s. A New South Wales's women's championship was held in 1936, 1939 and 1941.

== Competitors ==
As at January 2015, the following players are the top FIDE rated Australian female players:

1. Giang Nguyen, WFM
2. Irina Berezina, IM is an Australian Women's Chess Champion, and has represented the country in international competitions.
3. Heather Richards, WIM
4. Arianne Caoili, WIM
5. Biljana Dekic, WIM

Other top Australian female chess players, who are no longer regular tournament competitors, include Arianne Caoili (died 2020), Katrin Aladjova, Laura Moylan, Daniela Nutu-Gajic, and Ngan Phan-Koshnitsky.

== Australian Women's Champions ==
The Australian Women's Chess Championship has not been held since 1999 due to lack of interest by the Australian Chess Federation and the top women players of the time. The title of Australian Women's Champion is now awarded to the top finishing woman in the biennial Australian Open, subject to conditions being met.

- 2025 Heather Richards
- 2023 Leah Rice
- 2019 Julia Ryjanova
- 2017 Alexandra Jule
- 2015 Heather Richards
- 2003 Slavica Sarai
- 2002 Narelle Szuveges
- 1999 Irina Feldman
- 1998 Ngan Phan-Koshnitsky
- 1996 Biljana Dekic & Ngan Phan-Koshnitsky
- 1995 Daniela Nutu-Gajic
- 1992 Katrin Aladjova-Wills
- 1990 Josie Wright
- 1988 Carin Craig
- 1986 Josie Wright
- 1984 Anne Slavotinek
- 1982 Anne Slavotinek
- 1980 Marion McGrath
- 1978 Lynda Pope
- 1976 Marion McGrath
- 1974 Narelle Kellner
- 1972 Narelle Kellner
- 1969 Marion McGrath
- 1966 Marion McGrath

== See also ==
- Australian Women's Masters (chess)
- Chess in Australia

== Bibliography ==
- Stell, Marion K. (1991). Half the Race, A history of Australian women in sport. North Ryde, Australia: HarperCollins. ISBN 0-207-16971-3.
