= Women's squash =

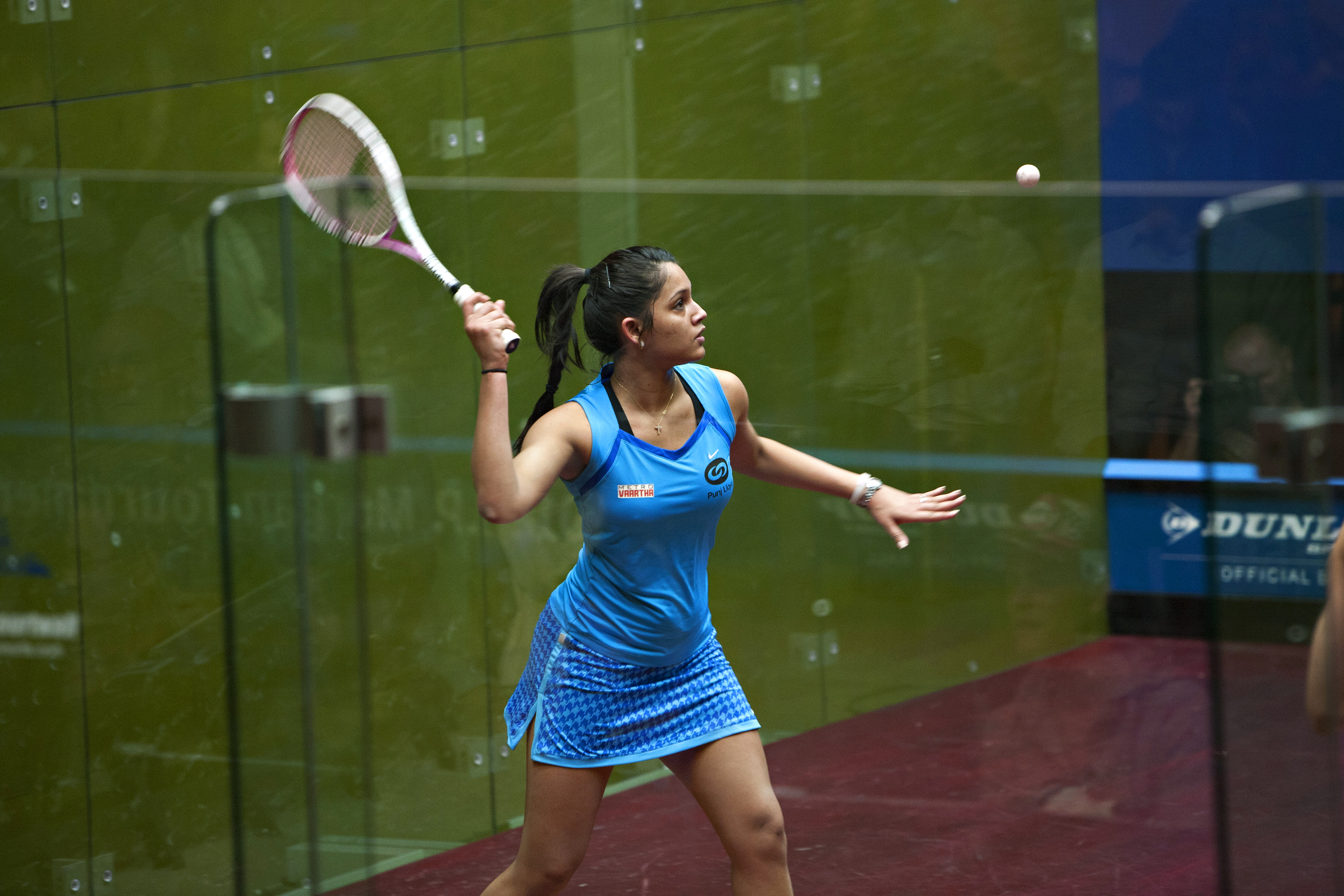
A female squash player from India.

Women's squash is the participation of women in the sport of squash. The women's championship started in 1922 as an amateur event and it remained so until 1974. The greatest player in the history of this discipline is the Australian Heather McKay, who won the championship 16 consecutive times from 1962 to 1977.

== Bibliography ==
- Janet Graydon, « Spatial ability in highly skilled women squash players », Perceptual and Motor Skills, vol. 50, n°3, June 1980, pp. 968–970.
- H. Haapasalo, P. Kannus, H. Sievänen, A. Heinonen, P. Oja and I. Vuori, « Long-term unilateral loading and bone mineral density and content in female squash players », Calcified Tissue International, vol. 54, 1994, pp. 249–255.
- M Hughes, J Wells and K Matthews, « Performance profiles at recreational, county and elite levels of women's squash », 2000.
- Saija Kontulainen, Pekka Kannus, Heidi Haapasalo, Harri Sievänen, Matti Pasanen, Ari Heinonen, Pekka Oja and Ilkka Vuori, « Good Maintenance of Exercise-Induced Bone Gain with Decreased Training of Female Tennis and Squash Players: A Prospective 5-Year Follow-Up Study of Young and Old Starters and Controls », Journal of Bone and Mineral Research, vol. 16, n°2, 2001.
- J Wells, MD Hughes, M Hughes and I Franks, « Movement profiles of elite women squash players », 2001.

== See also ==
- Official Women's Squash World Ranking
- Women's squash in Australia
