= Florence Campbell =

Florence Campbell may refer to:

- Florence Campbell (educator) (1877–1955), Australian school principal
- The maiden name of Florence Bravo, wife of murder victim Charles Bravo
- A fictional character played by Lynne Moody in ABC daytime drama series General Hospital
