= Dalyell (disambiguation) =

Dalyell is a surname.

Dalyell may also refer to:

- Dalyell baronets
- Tam Dalyell (1932–2017), Scottish Labour Party politician
- Elsie Dalyell (1881–1948), Australian pathologist
