= Aladzhov =

Aladzhov, Aladjov, female form Aladzhova, Aladjova (Bulgarian: Аладжов) is a Bulgarian surname. Notable people with the surname include:

- Stefan Aladzhov (born 1947), Bulgarian footballer
- Katrin Aladjova (born 1971), Bulgarian-Australian chess player
