= Marie Montgomerie Hamilton =

Australian pathologist and hockey administrator (1891–1955)

- Born: 7 April 1891; Sydney
- Died: 2 November 1955 (aged 64); Killara
- Education: Presbyterian Ladies' College; University of Sydney
- Known for: led the All-Australia Women's Hockey Association
- Children: one adopted

Marie Montgomerie Hamilton (7 April 1891 – 2 November 1955) was an Australian pathologist and hockey administrator. She opened a veneral disease clinic for women and led the All-Australia Women's Hockey Association.

== Life ==
Hamilton was born in 1891 in Sydney. Her parents were the UK-born Minnie Redfearn and her husband Hugh Montgomerie Hamilton - her father had been a successful sportsman and was an eminent judge. She was educated at the Presbyterian Ladies' College in Croydon, where she excelled at sports and academics. In 1913 she became the coach of the Presbyterian Ladies' College hockey team. She went on to qualify as a doctor at the University of Sydney and to play for their hockey team.

Her younger brother, George Redfearn Hamilton, was severely injured in World War I and her fiancé was killed.

In 1926, she was an assistant medical officer at the new Rachel Forster Hospital for Women and Children. She and Elsie Dalyell OBE began research concerning venereal disease in women. Treatment was difficult as penicillin would not be available for many years. Elsie Dalyell had been a committee member of the hospital since 1925 and in 1927 she and Hamilton started a clinic for venereal diseases at the hospital.

In 1932, her brother George was killed in an air crash. He had remarried after his first wife died, but the second marriage failed. He left a son and she adopted him. He was named Hugh Montgomerie Hamilton after his grandfather. In 1934 her work was based at her house in the Sydney suburb of Strathfield where they led an austere lifestyle supplemented by a housekeeper. She enjoyed a single cigarette taken after dinner with her friends from hockey or medicine.

Hamilton who had led the New South Wales Women's Hockey Association for over twenty years became the All-Australia Women's Hockey Association chair from 1932 to 1934 and again from 1945 to 1954.

She died in 1955 in the Sydney suburb of Killara.
