= Cecil Coghlan =

Australian politician

Cecil Aubrey Coghlan (1878 – 26 August 1924) was an Australian politician born in Redfern to builder Thomas Coghlan and Dora Jordan.

He attended Sydney Grammar School and was then a solicitor's clerk, working for John McLaughlin. In 1900, he was admitted as a solicitor and eventually ran a substantial industrial practice. He married Ellen Grant around 1903 and had three children. In 1921 he was appointed to the New South Wales Legislative Council as a Labor member, serving until his death at Darling Point in 1924. He was the brother of Sir Timothy Coghlan, government statistician and Agent-General, and Iza Coghlan, a medical doctor.
