= Elsie Dalyell =

Australian medical doctor (1881-1948)

Elsie Jean Dalyell OBE
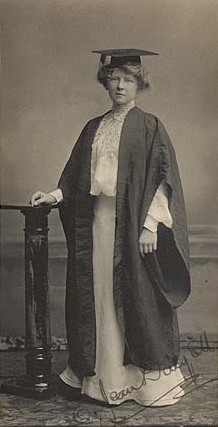
- Born: 13 December 1881; Newtown, New South Wales
- Died: 1 November 1948 (aged 66); Greenwich, New South Wales
- Education: University of Sydney
- Military career
- Branch: Scottish Women's Hospitals for Foreign Service 1916; Royal Army Medical Corps1917-1919
- World War I: Serbian Campaign

Elsie Jean Dalyell OBE (13 December 1881 – 1 November 1948) was an Australian medical doctor who specialised in pathology. During World War I, she served in the Royal Army Medical Corps across Europe, and was appointed an Officer of Order of the British Empire upon the conclusion of the war. In 1927 she co-founded a veneral disease clinic.

== Early life and education ==
Dalyell was born in 1881 in Newtown, New South Wales. Her parents were James Melville Dalyell, a mining engineer, and Jean McGregor. She attended Sydney Girls' High School under its first headmistress Lucy Garvin. She matriculated to the University of Sydney, where she studied arts and science for a year, intending to become a teacher, before transferring to medicine in 1906. During her time at the university, she was a resident of The Women's College, which she shortly after described as "the most pleasant [time] in my life". She received her Bachelor of Medicine in 1909, becoming one of the first women in the faculty to graduate with first class honours, and completed a Master of Surgery in 1910.

== Career ==
After graduation, Dalyell took a position demonstrating pathology at the university. Her first professional position was as a resident medical officer at Sydney's Royal Prince Alfred Hospital. In 1912 she became the first Australian woman to receive a Beit Memorial Fellowship for Medical Research, which took her to London to complete research at the Lister Institute of Preventive Medicine, for research into gastroenterology in children.

When World War I broke out, Dalyell left the institute to join the war effort, but her services were refused by the War Office. She instead joined the Serbian Relief Fund and travelled to Skopje, Macedonia, in 1915 to help in managing the typhus epidemic of the time. After the hospital that she had been working in was overrun by the Bulgarian army, Dalyell joined the Scottish Women's Hospitals for Foreign Service in 1916 and the Royal Army Medical Corps in 1917. Together, these commitments took her to France, Greece, Malta and Turkey. The RAMC placed her in charge of a laboratory in the 63rd General Hospital in Thessaloniki, a level of responsibility that had not previously been given to women. In 1919 she was appointed an Officer of the Order of the British Empire (O.B.E.) and was decorated by the Government of Serbia. Dalyell returned to Australia in 1920.

Dalyell then took up a senior clinician role with the research mission group of the Accessory Food Factors Committee in Vienna, led by Harriette Chick. She described the clinic as "the most scientific infant clinic" with "the most highly trained staff in the world". There she completed extensive research on paediatric malnutrition-related diseases, including rickets. In 1923 Dalyell returned to Sydney for a lecture tour, but then found she had very few job opportunities. Her attempt to open a private practice failed, and she was eventually hired by the New South Wales Department of Public Health as a senior assistant microbiologist in 1924.

In 1926 Dalyell and Marie Montgomerie Hamilton who was an assistant medical officer began research concerning veneral disease in women. Treatment was difficult as penicillin would not be available for many year. Dalyell was a committee member of the Rachel Forster Hospital for Women and Children from 1925 to 1935, and in 1927 she and Hamilton started a clinic for venereal diseases at the hospital.

During World War II, Dalyell organised the Blood Transfusion Service for the Red Cross.

Dalyell Street in the Canberra suburb of Chisholm is named in her honour.

== Personal life ==
In her later life, Dalyell lived in Greenwich, New South Wales. Her nieces, Elsa and Lindsay "Jean" Hazelton, lived with her until Jean died by suicide in 1931. Dalyell retired in 1946 and died on 1 November 1948 of hypertensive heart disease complicated by a coronary occlusion.

== Selected works ==
- Dalyell, Elsie Jean; Chick, Harriet (1921). Hunger - osteomalacia in Vienna, 1920 : its relation to diet. London: The Lancet.

== See also ==
- Other notable women volunteers in the Scottish Women's Hospitals for Foreign Service
- Women in World War I
- Australian women in World War I
- The Serbian campaign (1914-1915)
