= Women's golf in Australia =

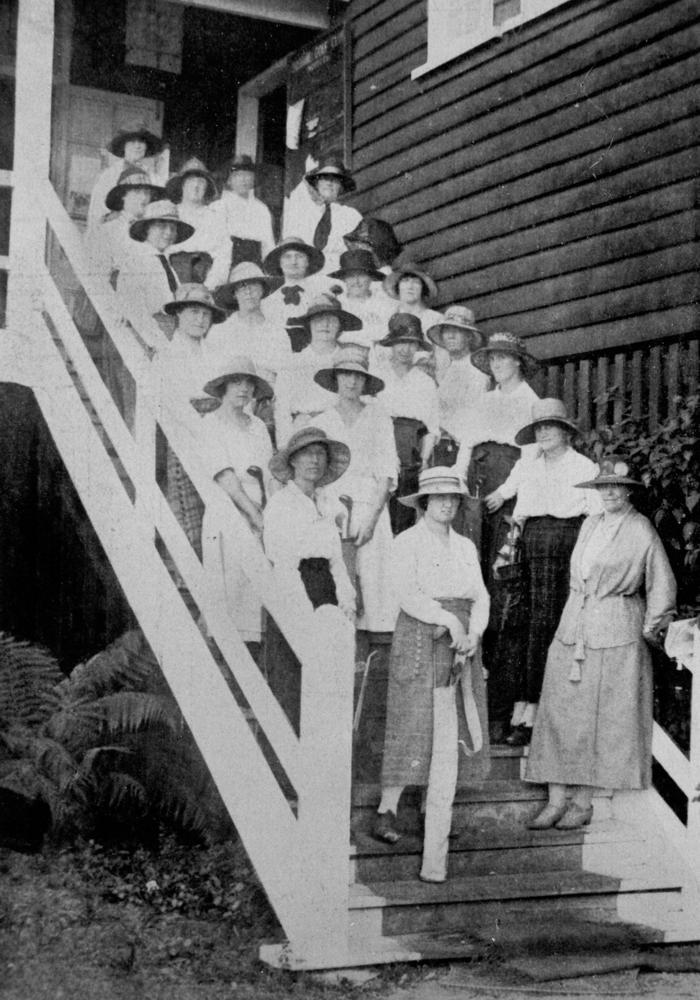
- Lady Associate members of the Brisbane Golf Club at the Yeerongpilly links, 1922
- Country: Australia
- National team: Australia

While not being urged to avoid competition, women had few opportunities to compete in sport in Australia until the 1880s. After that date, new sporting facilities were being built around the country and many new sport clubs were created. One of the reasons women were encouraged to play croquet, tennis and golf during the late 1800s was because it was scene as beneficial to their health. These sports were also seen as passive, non-aggressive and non-threatening to the period's concepts of masculinity and femininity. During the late 1800s and early 1900s, women were allowed to be members of golf clubs but most women could not be because the game was too expensive to play. Women were also limited because of restrictions imposed upon them by the men who ran the clubs and courses. For example, at the Brisbane Golf Club in 1901, women were not allowed to become full members, only associate members, could not belong to any club committees and there were limited times when they could play. Women were allowed to play and did in places such as Willowburn, Queensland. Like other sports of the time, women wore long sleeved blouses and skirts that were ankle length. They also wore hats while they were playing.

In 1922, a committee in Australia investigated the benefits of physical education for girls. They came up with several recommendations regarding what sports were and were not appropriate for girls to play based on the level of fitness required. It was determined that for some individual girls that for medical reasons, the girls should probably not be allowed to participate in tennis, netball, lacrosse, golf, hockey, and cricket. Soccer was completely medically inappropriate for girls to play. It was medically appropriate for all girls to be able to participate in, so long as they were not done in an overly competitive manner, swimming, rowing, cycling and horseback riding.

In 1934, the Victorian Women's Centennial Sports Carnival was held. The event was organised by the Victorian Women's Amateur Sports Council and held at the Melbourne Cricket Grounds. The purpose was to increase women's interest in sport by providing them opportunities to play. Sports that were included on the programme included cricket, field hockey, women's basketball, bowls, rowing, swimming, athletics, rifle shooting, baseball, golf, tennis and badminton. There were over 1,000 bowlers involved over the course a week. Cricket featured a match versus a visiting English side. Women's basketball featured a Victorian side playing against a representative all Australian side. There was a day for watersports such as swimming and rowing. A tennis tournament was held. A field hockey tournament featuring Australian, Kiwi and Fijian teams was played.

In 1940, a study of 314 women in New Zealand and Australia was done. Most of the women in the study were middle class, conservative, Protestant and white. The study found that 183 participated in sport. The second most popular sport that these women participated in was golf, with 83 having played the sport.

The second World War was disruptive to women's golf in Australia. Some golfers, such as Wilma Fowler and Kitty McEwen, joined up with the Women's Land Army to help the war effort.

Australian women's sports had an advantage over many other women's sport organisations around the world in the period after World War II. Women's sport organisations had largely remained intact and were holding competitions during the war period. This structure survived in the post war period. Women's sport were not hurt because of food rationing, petrol rationing, population disbursement, and other issues facing post-war Europe.

== See also ==
- Category:Australian female golfers
- Netball in Australia
- Women's association football in Australia
- Women's field hockey in Australia

== Bibliography ==
- Evening Post (19 December 1922). "Women in Print". Evening Post. Vol. CC, no. 147. New Zealand: National Library of New Zealand. p. 7.
- Howell, Max; Howell, Reet; Brown, David W. (1989). The Sporting Image, A pictorial history of Queenslanders at play. Brisbane: University of Queensland Press. ISBN 0-7022-2206-2.
- Stell, Marion K. (1991). Half the Race, A history of Australian women in sport. North Ryde, Australia: HarperCollins. ISBN 0-207-16971-3.
