= Women's fishing in Australia =

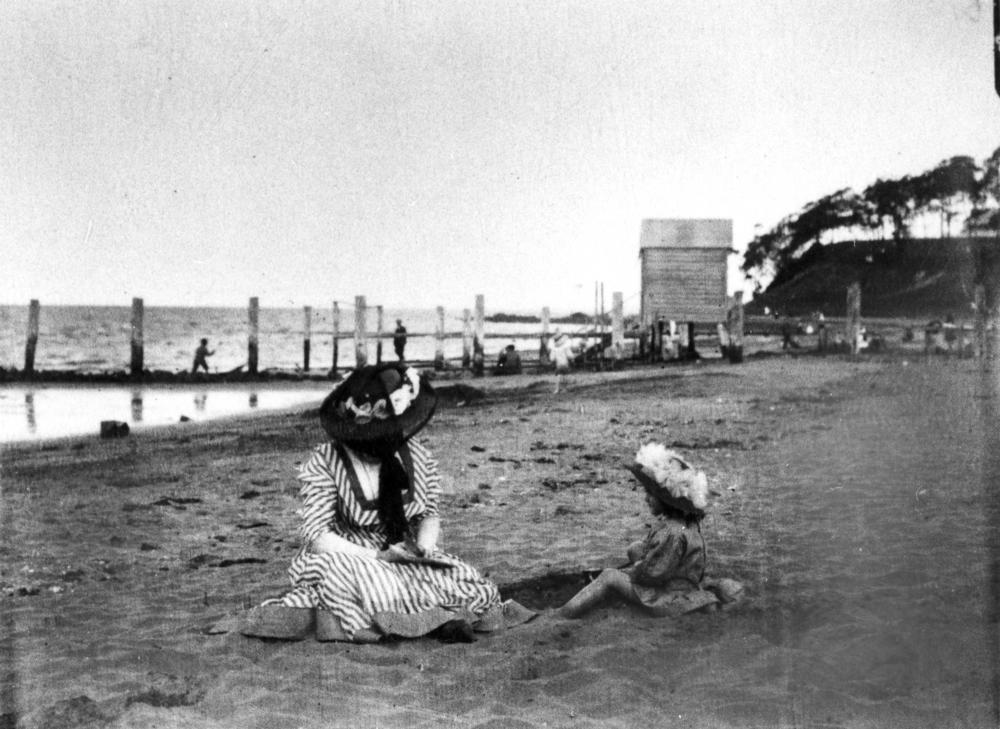
Woman and child sitting on the beach at Sandgate, Brisbane, ca. 1907

Australia's fishing has been both an essential cultural pastime for women in pre-European Australia, and as a sport in recent times.

The historical context of women's roles in fishing in pre-European cultural context saw extensive involvement and also in more recent times the industry has had specific support from women's involvement.

== Sport ==
Women were competing in fishing derbies by 1936, with their participation rates being higher than men's at some events. They continued to participate in the sport during the 1940s. More recently, Game Fishing Association of Australia has several competition classes that women can compete in against other women.

=== History ===
In a 1936 fishing derby, there were more male participants than female participants. Women's fishing was being covered by Australian newspapers during the 1930s. The Adelaide Advertiser cited Cleopatra as a reason Australian women should fish, and discussed how one Australian woman has caught more fish than her husband. In 1940, a study of 314 women in New Zealand and Australia was done. Most of the women in the study were middle class, conservative, Protestant and white. The study found that 183 participated in sport. The ninth most popular sport that these women participated in was fishing, with 3 having played the sport. The sport was tied with croquet, billiards, chess, fishing, field hockey, horse racing, squash, table tennis and shooting. In 1952, there was a women only fishing derby in Sydney.

== Competitive fishing ==
The Game Fishing Association of Australia has women only categories for competitions in saltwater, freshwater, saltwater fly, freshwater fly, and land based saltwater.

== See also ==
- Fishing in Australia

== Bibliography ==
- Stell, Marion K. (1991). Half the Race, A history of Australian women in sport. North Ryde, Australia: HarperCollins. ISBN 0-207-16971-3.
