= Henry Gullett (New South Wales politician) =

Australian politician

The Honourable Henry Gullett
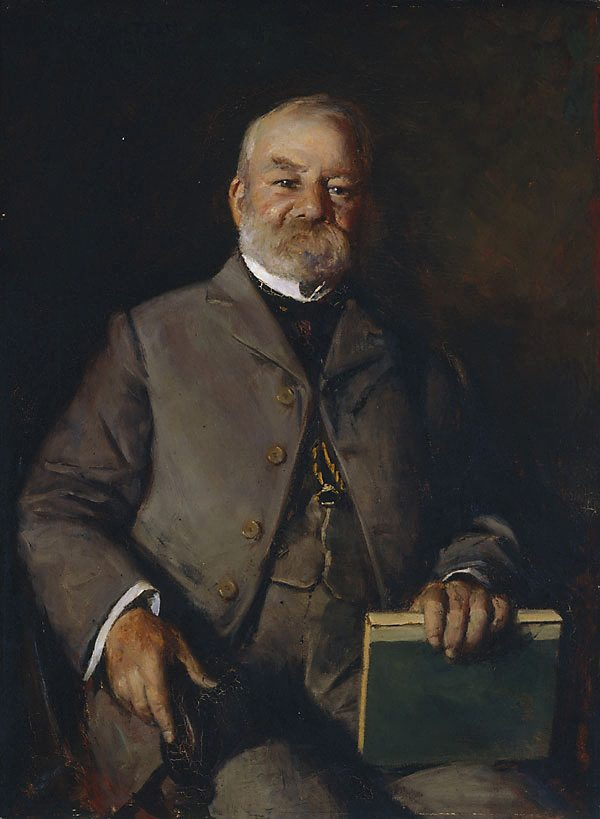
- Gullet in a painting by Julian Ashton, c. 1905

Member of the New South Wales Legislative Council
- In office 21 July 1908 – 4 August 1914

Personal details
- Born: 20 January 1837 South Devon, England
- Died: 4 August 1914 (aged 77) Wahroonga, Sydney, New South Wales, Australia
- Party: Liberal Reform Party
- Spouse: Lucy Willie
- Relations: Lucy Gullett (daughter); Henry Somer Gullett (nephew); Jo Gullett
- Occupation: Journalist, editor

Henry Gullett (20 January 1837 – 4 August 1914) was an English-born Australian journalist and politician.

He was born in South Devon to stonemason Henry Gullett. He migrated to Australia in 1853 to follow the gold rush, and then worked on his father's farm at Lancefield in Victoria. He returned to England in 1861, and then to Australia in 1863 to work as a journalist for the Argus. In 1872 he married fellow journalist Lucy Willie, with whom he had four daughters. Their daughter, Lucy Gullett would go on to pursue a medical career.

He was editor of the Australasian in Melbourne (1872-1885).

Gullett spent time in Ceylon as an editor and from 1885 was based in Sydney as assistant editor of the Daily Telegraph. In 1890 he and the rest of the editorial staff resigned over a policy issue, although he remained with the newspaper as a director. Strongly in favour of Federation, he was acting editor of the Sydney Morning Herald during the 1898 referendum. He was again an editor at the Daily Telegraph from 1901 to 1903. In 1908 he was appointed to the New South Wales Legislative Council as a Liberal; he remained there until his death at Wahroonga in 1914.
