= Women's horse racing in Australia =

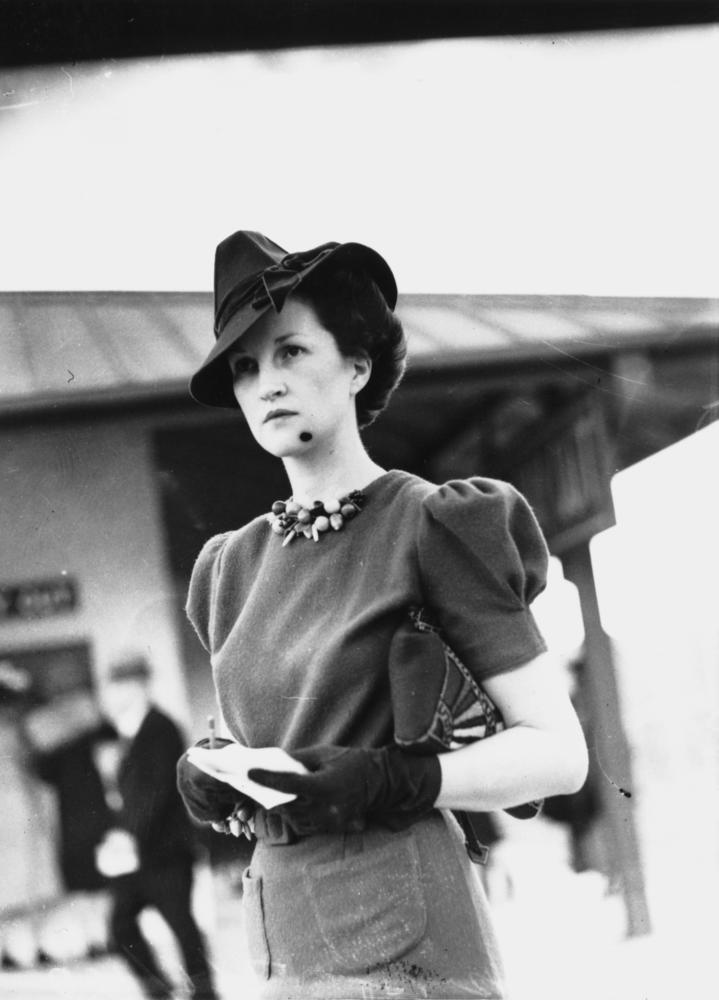
A Mrs Blackburne at the Doomben race meeting, 1940

Women were involved with horse racing in Australia by the 1890s. Since then, they have owned horses, trained horses, gambled on horses and attended the races. Their participation in the sport was hampered because of a lack of facilities and participation rates were not as high as other sports.

== History ==
Women were involved in gambling on horse racing in Australia during the 1890s. They won some money by placing bets and in some cases were calling odds on races. Women frequently attended horse racing events as spectators in Queensland during the second half of the nineteenth century. By the late 1920s, there were efforts to ban horse racing in Australia because the sport was seen to have a corrupting influence on Australian women. In 1934, the first female owned horse was entered in the Melbourne Cup. Women were involved in horse racing around the country by the 1930s. They were among the attendees at a 1939 race in Yass, New South Wales. By the 1950s, women were dominant in the horse racing industry, with several wealthy women such as Elizabeth Arden being well known owners and Elizabeth Dangerfield, Elsie Morris and Judy Johnson being well known trainers.

== Participation ==
While not being urged to avoid competition, women had few opportunities to compete in sport in Australia until the 1880s. After that date, new sporting facilities were being built around the country and many new sport clubs were created. By the 1930s, Australian women were involved as participants in the sport as a means of getting physical activity. This was characterised by at least one newspaper as being part of the "Cult of the Amazon."

In 1940, a study of 314 women in New Zealand and Australia was done. Most of the women in the study were middle class, conservative, Protestant and white. The study found that 183 participated in sport. The third most popular sport that these women participated in was horse riding, with 38 having played the sport. The ninth most popular sport that these women participated in was horse racing, with 3 having played the sport. The sport was tied with billiards, chess, fishing, field hockey, croquet, squash, table tennis and shooting.

== Bibliography ==
- Howell, Max; Howell, Reet; Brown, David W. (1989). The Sporting Image, A pictorial history of Queenslanders at play. Brisbane: University of Queensland Press. ISBN 0-7022-2206-2.
- Stell, Marion K. (1991). Half the Race, A history of Australian women in sport. North Ryde, Australia: Harper Collins. ISBN 0-207-16971-3.
