= Grace Boelke =

Australian medical doctor

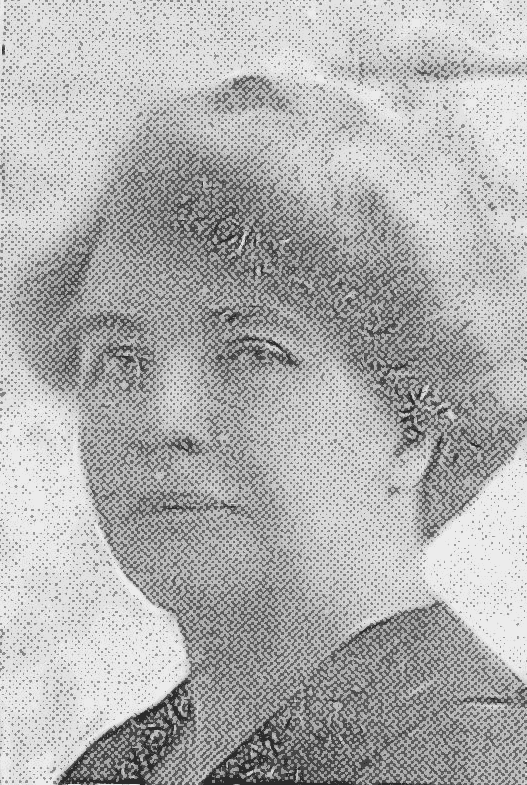
Grace Boelke in 1919

Grace Fairley Boelke (4 July 1870 – 17 February 1948) was an Australian medical doctor. She was one of the first female graduates in medicine from the University of Sydney.

== Early life and education ==
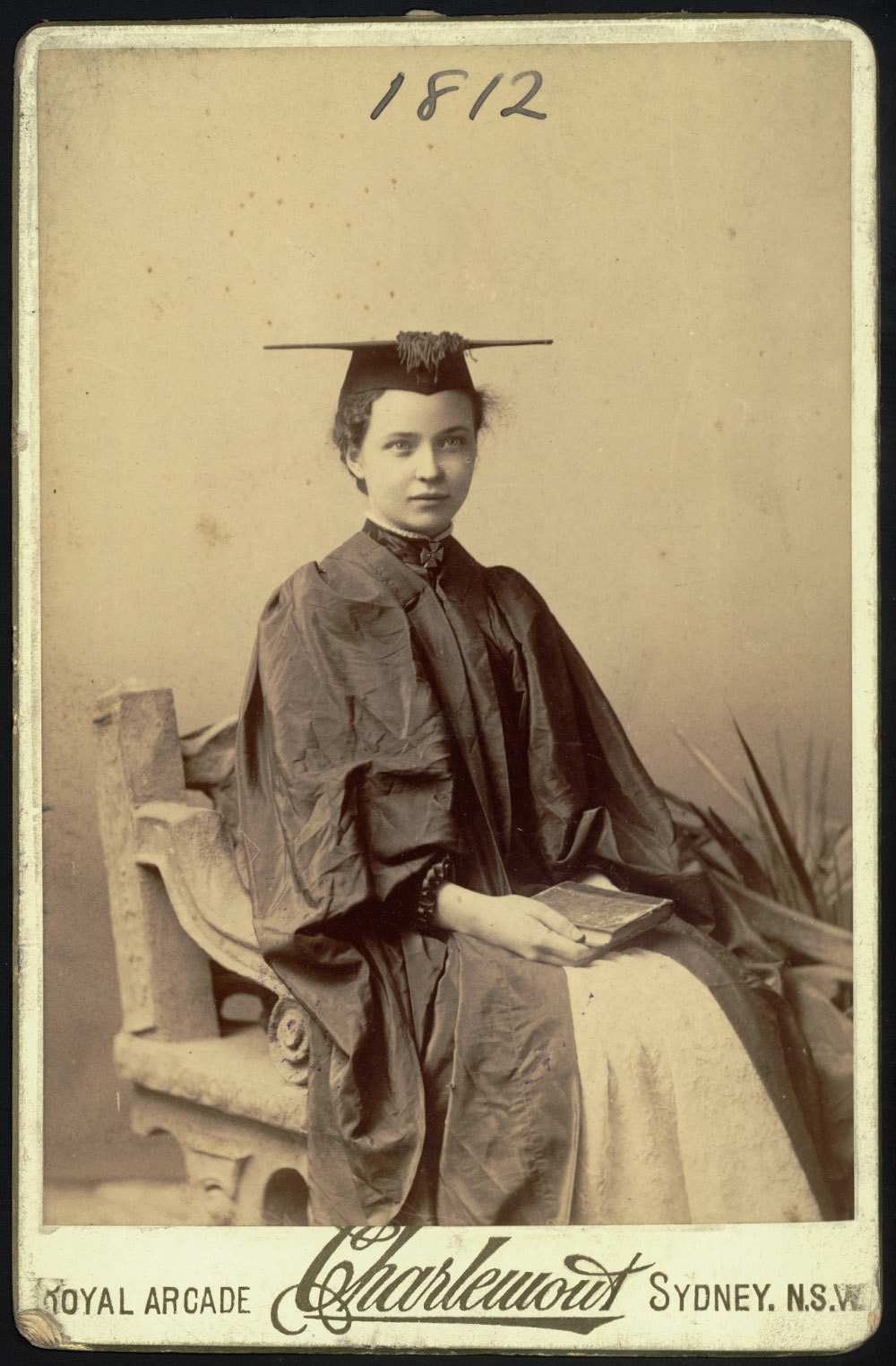
Grace Fairley Robinson applying for registration as a medical practitioner in New South Wales

Boelke was born Grace Fairley Robinson in South Kingston, a suburb of Sydney now included in Stanmore, New South Wales. Her parents were Thomas Charles Robinson, a clerk, and Eliza Agnes Butler. She was educated at St Vincent's College, Potts Point and later attended the University of Sydney. She graduated from university in 1893 with a Bachelor of Medicine, Bachelor of Surgery double degree. She won accolades from the university for her work in surgery and midwifery, and was one of the first two female medical graduates from the university, alongside Iza Coghlan.

== Medical career ==
After graduating from university, Boelke's application for a position at the Sydney Hospital for Sick Children was declined because she was a woman, but she was successful in acquiring a position as resident medical officer at the Sydney Benevolent Asylum – a position she held from 1894 until 1909. In May 1894 she married her fellow medical graduate, German-born Paul Wilhelm Rudolph Boelke.

In 1909 she was hired by the New South Wales Department of Public Instruction as an assistant instructing medical officer, but she was forced to resign in 1915 after the anti-German British Medical Association questioned her suitability for the role. She founded the Professional Women's Association in 1912 with the aim of uniting professional women to campaign for improvement of women's social standing. She was a convenor of the National Council of Women of New South Wales' health committee during 1913–26, a vice president of Sydney's Town Planning Association, and a founding member of New South Wales branch of the League of Nations Union in 1921. She was employed by Berlei, an Australian lingerie manufacturer, from 1923 to 1926 as a medical director, a role that involved overseeing the welfare of the company's female workers and ensuring the "correct anatomical lines of their garments".

== Later life ==
Paul Boelke died in 1923 before the couple had any children. Grace Boelke spent her later life travelling overseas for research into women and children's health, and moved to the suburb of Leura in the Blue Mountains. She died in Manly, New South Wales on 17 February 1948, leaving her estate to the British Royal Society of Medicine for the funding of medical research.
