= Margaret Holmes =

Australian peace activist

Margaret Holmes AM
- Born: Margaret Joan Read; 24 January 1909; Sydney, New South Wales, Australia
- Died: 10 September 2009 (aged 100); Coffs Harbour, New South Wales, Australia
- Known for: Peace activism

Margaret Joan Holmes AM (née Read; 24 January 1909 – 10 September 2009) was an Australian peace activist, particularly during the Vietnam War and as part of the Anglican Pacifist Fellowship. She founded the New South Wales branch of the Women's International League for Peace and Freedom in 1960, and in 2001 was made a Member of the Order of Australia for her services to the community.

== Biography ==
Cover of Margaret Holmes' biography, written by Michelle Cavanagh and published in 2006

Margaret Holmes was born into a wealthy Sydney family on 24 January 1909, the eldest of five children, and grew up in Wahroonga. Her parents were Irene Victoria Read and Dr William Henry Read. Her mother volunteered her life for good causes and she had met her husband while both of them were workers at the Sydney Medical Mission. Her father had served in Egypt and her mother was a strong supporter of Australia conscripting men to fight in the first world war.

Holmes attended The Women's College, University of Sydney, where she was the first female student to have a car, and studied medicine. While at university, Holmes became involved with the Christian Student Movement and identified with Christian pacifism. She graduated with a Bachelor of Science and in 1933 married a doctor, T. A. G. (Tag) Holmes, instead of becoming one.

Margaret and Tag Holmes built a home in Military Road, Mosman, a suburb on Sydney's Lower North Shore, where T. A. G. Holmes had his medical practice and they raised six children. At the beginning of World War II, the Holmeses established the "50-50 Club", a weekly social evening where "new Australians" could get to know the locals and better integrate into their new society.

In 1959, Holmes made a trip to attend the congress of the Women's International League for Peace and Freedom in Stockholm; she had come to know of this women's peace organisation in 1940 through articles in The Peacemaker written by Eleanor Moore. As there was no Sydney branch of WILPF at that time, she joined as an international member. She founded the NSW Branch when she returned from the congress. Her trip included travelling to Austria for an IFOR conference, to Russia (where she delivered smuggled bibles to the Moscow Baptist Church) and to India (at the invitation of Sushila Nayar, whom she had met at the WILPF congress).

In the 1960s during the Vietnam War, Holmes' activism became most public. She led demonstrations including the walk-out and was a regular campaigner in downtown Sydney, participating in prayer vigils, candlelight vigils, public meetings and leaflet distribution. During this time she also became active in campaigning for Aboriginal rights and nuclear disarmament. Her biography, Margaret Holmes: The Life and Times of an Australian Peace Campaigner, written by Michelle Cavanagh, was published in 2006. Her life has also been documented in various oral histories and other material, some of which is held by the Australian War Memorial.

== Honours ==
In 2001, Holmes was made a Member of the Order of Australia at the Queen's Birthday Honours, "for service to the community through organisations promoting peace, human rights and conflict resolution, particularly as a member of the Women's International League for Peace and Freedom".

== Death ==
Holmes celebrated her 100th birthday on 24 January 2009 at her home in Sydney, with her six children, several grandchildren and great-grandchildren. She died on 10 September 2009 in Coffs Harbour, Australia.

== See also ==
- List of peace activists
