= Rachel Forster Hospital =

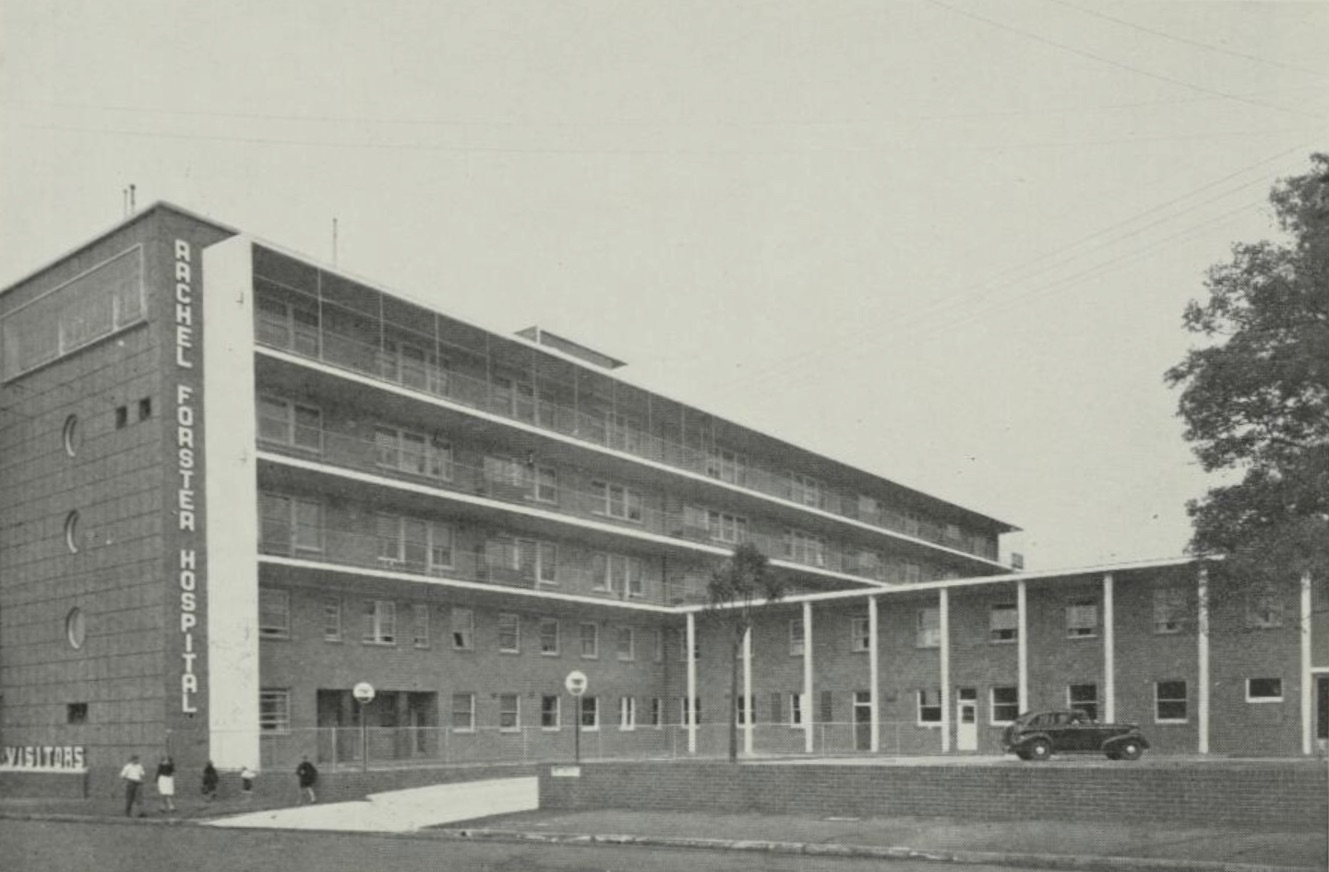
- In 1941

Geography
- Location: Redfern, Sydney, Australia
- Coordinates: 33.894906°S 151.202670°E

History
- Former name: New Hospital
- Opened: 3 January 1922
- Closed: 2002

Links
- Lists: Hospitals in Australia

The Rachel Forster Hospital for Women and Children opened on 3 January 1922 in Redfern (an inner suburb of Sydney, Australia) as the 'New Hospital'.

== History ==
In 1921, Lucy Gullett worked with Harriet Biffen to create what became the Rachel Forster Hospital. Initial goals were to serve as a training hospital for female doctors and to serve women and children. Lucy Gullett served as the hospital's secretary and she invited Irene Victoria Read to join the hospital's committee in 1924. In 1925 the hospital was renamed after Baroness Rachel Forster, the wife of the then Governor-General of Australia, Henry Forster, 1st Baron Forster.

Lucy Gullet stood down as secretary in 1926. Irene Read's involvement grew stronger, she was the hospital's President from 1930 to 1950 with Gullett as her vice-president from 1932 to 1949.

In 1927, Elsie Dalyell and Marie Montgomerie Hamilton started a clinic for venereal diseases at the hospital. It later grew to include other specialised clinics and a breast cancer research centre.

From 1936 to 1939 Edna Lillian Nelson was the director of the venereal-diseases clinic. She left for further post-grad study in Europe in 1939. She soon returned (because of the war) and she then went part-time until in 1943 she was a consultant.

The hospital started admitting men in 1967. The Rachel Forster Hospital continued to provide general and specialised medical and surgical care until its closure in September, 2000. The services and staff were absorbed into Royal Prince Alfred Hospital, with which it had enjoyed a long association.

== Closure and Redevelopment ==
The hospital was first threatened with closure in 1990, and after vigorous community campaigns opposing this, eventually closed in September 2000 and services were transferred to Royal Prince Alfred Hospital by mid 2002.

In 2013, City of Sydney councillor Irene Doutney raised strong concerns about the proposed redevelopment of the site, suggesting that most of the hospital would be demolished apart from the eastern facade and the colonnades at the front entrance, with much of the site being replaced with apartments. She suggested that the hospital had been left to "demolition by neglect", and that in the new development "They’re going to keep the minimum amount of heritage possible then bang a new building down. It's not adaptive re-use at all, it's demolition."

In December 2014, The Daily Telegraph ran a photo piece documenting the deteriorating and vandalised state of the hospital despite its former significance, and referring to Doutney's 2013 concerns about the site falling victim to "demolition by neglect."
