= Lucy Gullett =

Australian medical doctor and philanthropist (1876–1949)

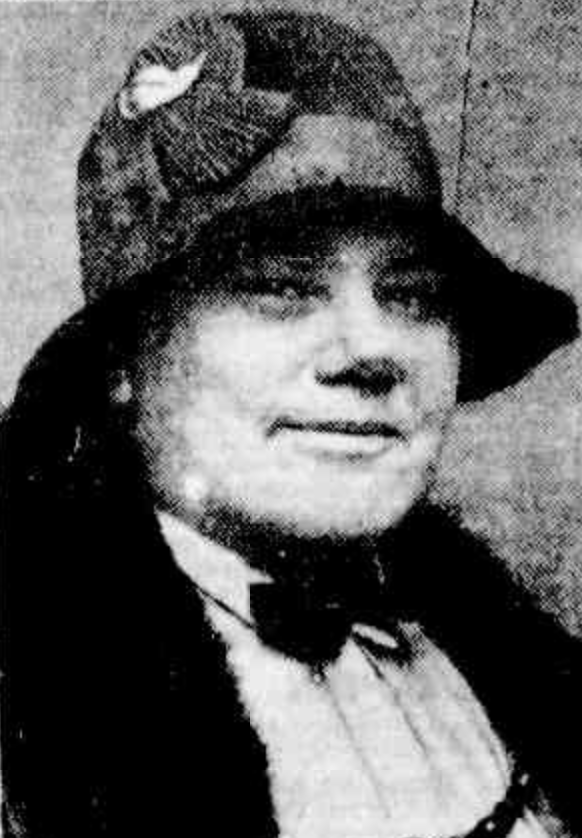
- Dr Lucy Gullett, c.1932
- Born: Lucy Edith Gullett; 28 September 1876; Hawthorn, Victoria
- Died: 12 November 1949 (aged 73); Redfern, New South Wales
- Occupations: physician and philanthropist
- Known for: co-founder, Rachel Forster Hospital
- Relatives: Henry Gullett (father); Henry Somer Gullett (cousin); Jo Gullett

Lucy Edith Gullett (28 September 1876 – 12 November 1949) was an Australian medical practitioner and philanthropist. She was a founder of the Rachel Forster Hospital in Sydney.

== Early life and education ==
Lucy Edith Gullett was born in Hawthorn in Melbourne to journalist Henry Gullett and Lucy, née Willie. She was educated at Sydney Girls' High School and the University of Sydney, taking her degree in 1902.

== Career ==
Gullett was the first resident medical officer at the Crown Street Women's Hospital from 1901 to 1902 and resident surgeon at Brisbane's Hospital for Sick Children from 1902 to 1903. She was a GP at Bathurst from 1906 to 1911, when she returned to Wahroonga to live with her sister Minnie. The sisters campaigned together for mental health reform, but Lucy's medical practice declined as she had less need for income. During World War I she travelled to Europe at her own expense to serve the Red Cross at a military hospital in Lyon. She was a medical officer in Sydney during the influenza epidemic in 1919. From 1918 to 1932 she was an honorary outpatients physician with the Renwick Hospital for Infants, and she was a councillor of the Sydney District Nursing Association from 1934 to 1949.

In 1921, Gullett founded the New South Wales Association of Registered Medical Women, serving as secretary. Together with the president, Harriet Biffen, she took a leading role in establishing the New Hospital for Women and Children, which was renamed the Rachel Forster Hospital for Women and Children in 1925. Gullett resigned as secretary in 1926 but remained involved in the movement, serving as vice-president from 1932 to 1949. She had invited her friend Irene Victoria Read to join the hospital's committee and she was President from 1930 to 1950. Gullett opened the Lucy Gullett Convalescent Home in 1946. In 1932 she ran unsuccessfully as an independent women's candidate for the New South Wales Legislative Assembly, contesting the seat of North Sydney Gullett was elected to the United Associations of Women executive committee in 1935 and served as vice-president from 1936 to 1938 and in 1943.

== Personal life ==
In 1943, her sister Minnie died and Gullett lived with the cellist June Holland. A long-time sufferer from nephritis, Gullett died in 1949, some months after suffering a stroke. Her will included a bequest of 2,000 books to the Newcastle Public Library, including many reference books.

== Awards and honours ==
- In 1978, a street in the Canberra suburb of Chisholm was named Lucy Gullett Circuit in her honour.
