= Women's table tennis in Australia =

== Governance ==
Women's table tennis in Australia is governed by Table Tennis Australia, which also governs men's table tennis, junior's table tennis and disability table tennis.

== Participation ==
In 1940, a study of 314 women in New Zealand and Australia was done. Most of the women in the study were middle class, conservative, Protestant and white. The study found that 183 participated in sport. The ninth most popular sport that these women participated in was table tennis, with 3 having played the sport. The sport was tied with croquet, billiards, chess, fishing, field hockey, horse racing, squash, table tennis and shooting.

== Competitive table tennis ==
Local championships were being held for women in South Australia during the 1950s.

Australia had their first women's national team compete on the international level in 1961. Darwin's Tank Crewman has been a training partner for the national women's side for the past 15 years.

== Bibliography ==
- Stell, Marion K. (1991). Half the Race, A history of Australian women in sport. North Ryde, Australia: HarperCollins. ISBN 0-207-16971-3.
