= Ada Beveridge =

Australian Country Women's Association leader

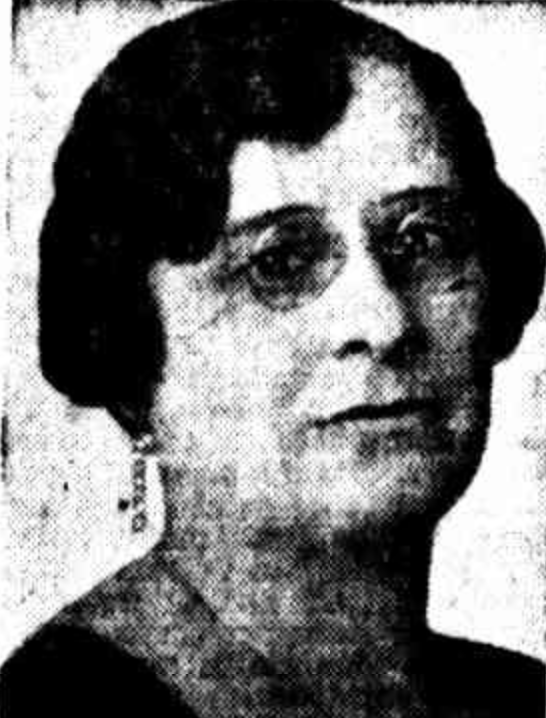
Ada Beveridge

Ada Beveridge MBE, née Beardmore (15 February 1875 – 20 January 1964) was an Australian Country Women's Association leader.

== Life ==
Born at Townsville in Queensland to commission agent Frederick Joshua Wathen Beardmore and Emily Anne, née Commins, Ada attended Sydney Girls High School as a scholarship student before studying at the University of Sydney, receiving her Bachelor of Arts in 1896 with first-class honours in English and becoming a schoolteacher. She married grazier James William Caldwell Beveridge at Croydon on 20 January 1904 and moved to his property at Gundagai and later Junee.

Beveridge joined the Country Women's Association (CWA) soon after its 1922 establishment and was the founder of the Junee branch in 1926. From 1937 to 1940 she was international vice-president of the Pan-Pacific Women's Association, attending conferences in Honolulu (1934) and Vancouver (1937). She started an eleven-year service as an executive member of the New South Wales Bush Nursing Association in 1938. She was elected state president of the CWA in 1938 and vigorously performed her duties, despite a serious car accident in 1939 and contracting pneumonia in 1940, the year in which she retired. As president of the CWA at the outbreak of World War II, she actively mobilised support for the war effort and was foundation director and executive chairman of the Women's Australian National Services from 1940 to 1942. She was appointed Member of the Order of the British Empire in 1941.

Beveridge contested the Senate at the 1943 election as an independent, temporarily suspending her involvement with the apolitical CWA. After her defeat, she returned in a local capacity before travelling to Amsterdam in 1947 and Copenhagen in 1951 as a delegate to the Associated Country Women of the World conferences. Having moved to Roseville after her husband's death in 1959, Beveridge died there in 1964 and was cremated.
