= Daniela Nuțu-Gajić =

Australian chess player (born 1957)

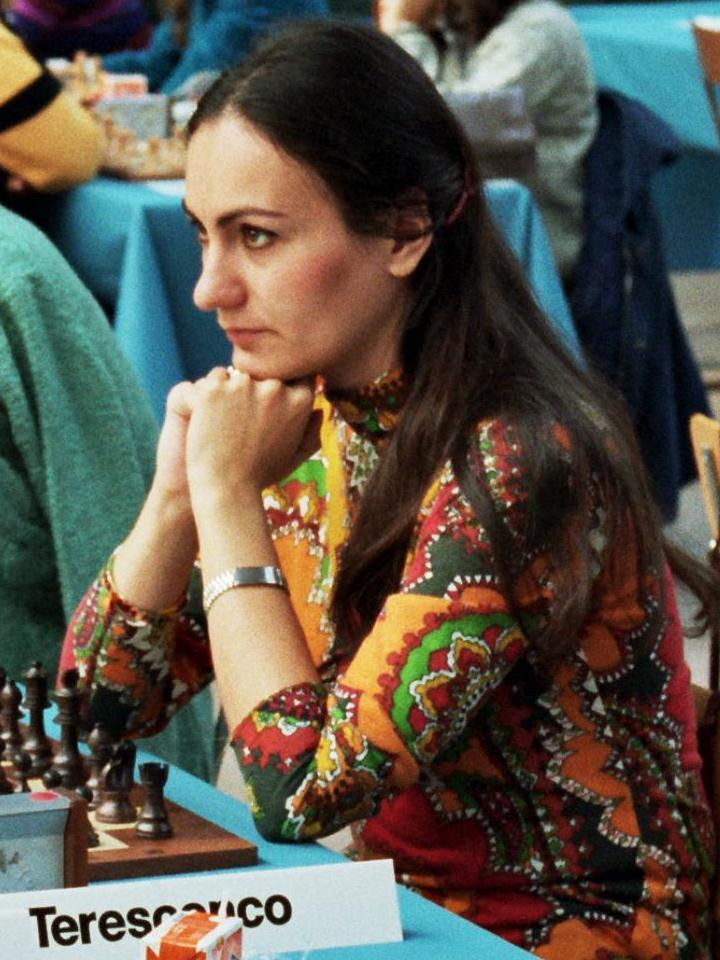
- Daniela Nuțu-Gajić at the 25th Chess Olympiad in Lucerne, Switzerland 1982.

Personal information
- Born: 8 June 1957 (age 69) Timișoara, Romania

Chess career
- Country: Australia
- Title: Woman Grandmaster (1986)
- FIDE rating: 2350 (December 2013; inactive)
- Peak rating: 2355 (January 1993)

Daniela Nuțu-Gajić (born Daniela Silvia Nuțu; 8 June 1957) is a Romanian Australian chess Woman Grandmaster (WGM) and chess trainer. She represented Romania in seven Chess Olympiads, winning five medals, including two individual gold medals. She won the Romanian Women's Chess Championship three times in 1978, 1979 and 1980, the Yugoslav Women's Chess Championship in 1989, and the Australian Women's Chess Championship in 1995.

== Chess career ==
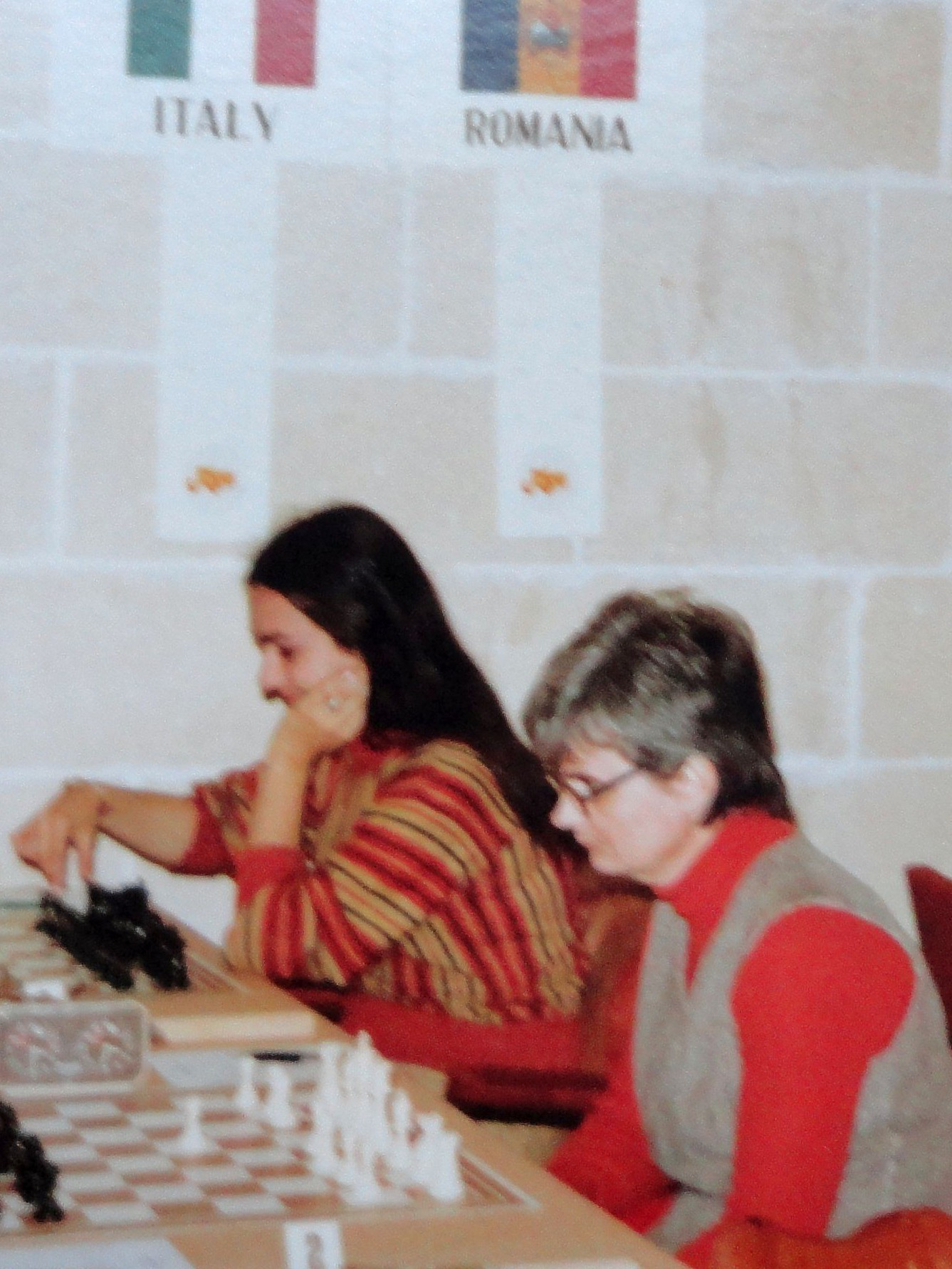
Daniela Nutu and Gertrude Baumstark, 1980 in Valletta

Nuțu-Gajić won the Romanian Women's Chess Championship three times in 1978, 1979, and 1980, finished second in 1983, and third in 1984 and 1985.

Nuțu-Gajić represented Romania in seven Chess Olympiads from 1978 to 1994 and won five medals in total. She scored 7.5/10 in the 24th Chess Olympiad in Valletta 1980, and won the gold medal on board 3. She then improved on this by scoring 11/12 in the 25th Chess Olympiad in Lucerne 1982, to win the individual gold medal on board 3, and the team silver medal. She also helped Romania win two team bronze medals in Thessaloniki 1984 and Dubai 1986. She also won against former Women's World Chess Champion Nona Gaprindashvili at the 1992 Olympiad in Manila.

She represented Romania in three Women's Chess Balkaniad events in 1979, 1985, 1992. She won one team gold medal in 1985, two individual silver medals (in 1985 and 1992), two team silver medals (in 1979 and 1992) and an individual bronze medal (in 1979).

She won, or jointly won, a number of international competitions including Plovdiv 1979, Bad Kissingen 1981, Băile Herculane 1982 and 1986, and Acropolis Athens 1983. She also scored podium finishes in Novi Sad 1979, Capablanca Memorial Havana 1986, Tuzla 1991, Nova Gorica 1993, and Bohemia Chrudim 1994.

She competed in a number of Women's World Chess Championship Zonal Tournaments and two Interzonals. She scored 8.5/13 and finished equal third, with Pia Cramling and Nana Ioseliani, in the Interzonal in Havana 1985, but Cramling won the play-off matches and qualified into the Candidates Tournament ahead of her. She scored 7/13 and finished equal 13th in the Interzonal in Subotica 1991. She finished second, behind Ildiko Madl, in the Zonal tournament in Hajdúszoboszló 1991, finished equal third in Timișoara 1993, and competed in Nadole 1995.

Nuțu-Gajić scored 10.5/15 and convincingly won the 42nd Yugoslav Women's Chess Championship in 1989.

Nuțu-Gajić gained the Woman International Master (WIM) title in 1978, the Woman Grandmaster (WGM) title in 1986, and the FIDE Trainer title in 2007.

After moving to Australia, she made a big impact on Women's chess in Australia, winning both the Australian Women's Championship and the South Australian (open) Championship in 1995, and the Queensland Women's Championship in 1996.

Nuțu-Gajić was Australia's first Woman Grandmaster and at 2350 is the highest rated woman, but she has not played in any FIDE rated tournaments since 1998. As of 2014, she resides in Adelaide and is an active junior chess coach.

== Personal life ==
Nuțu-Gajić studied a Bachelor of Science degree in Information Technology and Mathematics at the Polytechnic University of Timișoara, and as of 2014 works in the Information Technology industry.
