= Iza Coghlan =

Australian medical doctor

Iza Coghlan MBBS ChM
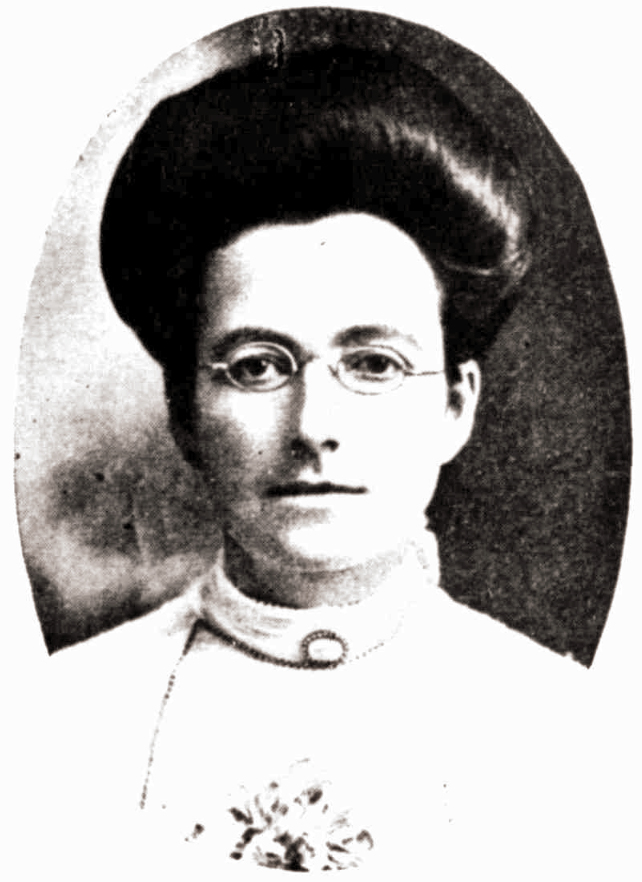
- Iza Coghlan in 1906
- Born: 10 October 1868; Redfern, New South Wales
- Died: 1 July 1946 (aged 77); Collaroy, New South Wales
- Occupation: Medical doctor

Iza Frances Josephine Coghlan MBBS ChM (10 October 1868 – 1 July 1946) was an Australian medical doctor. With Grace Boelke, she was one of the first two female graduates in medicine from the University of Sydney.

== Biography ==
Coghlan was born in Redfern, a suburb of Sydney, in 1868, to Irish immigrant parents. Her father, Thomas Coghlan, a plasterer, died when Iza was 13. She received a scholarship to attend Sydney Girls High School when it opened in 1883. She enrolled at the University of Sydney in 1887 and was the sole woman in the year's intake of medical students. In 1897, she graduated with a bachelor of medicine and a master of surgery, making her one of the first female graduates in medicine in the state of New South Wales, along with Grace Boelke.

Coghlan established a private practice in Sydney in 1893 and began working as a life insurance medical assessor in 1894. From 1910, she medically examined candidates seeking employment in the federal public service, and from 1915 she worked as a medical officer in the NSW Department of Public Instruction. She was a co-founder and president of the NSW Medical Women's Society and worked with St John Ambulance Australia to give lectures on first aid and home nursing.

She never married, and retired in 1930 to live with two of her sisters in Collaroy in northern Sydney. She died on 1 July 1946 from coronary heart disease. She had eight siblings, including the statistician and engineer Timothy Augustine Coghlan, the lawyer Charles Coghlan, and the politician Cecil Coghlan.
