= Florence Campbell (educator) =

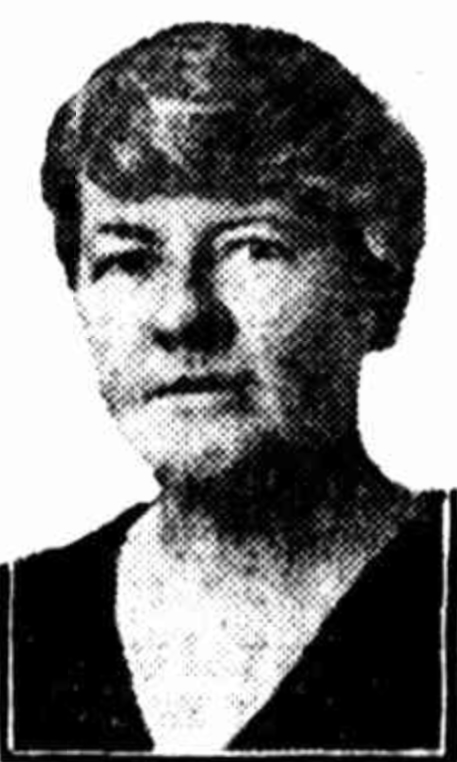
- Campbell in 1926
- Born: Florence Eva McKenzie Campbell; 24 February 1877; New South Wales, Australia
- Died: 20 July 1955 (aged 78)
- Education: University of Sydney
- Occupation: Headmistress
- Employers: NSW Department of Education; Sydney Girls High School

Florence Campbell (24 February 1877 – 20 July 1955) was an Australian educator. She served as headmistress of Sydney Girls High School from 1919 to 1941.

== Life ==
Florence Eva McKenzie Campbell was born on the Clarence River on 24 February 1877. She was the daughter of Mary Layton (née Archibald) (d. 1928) and Samuel Campbell. She was educated at the Grafton superior public school, appearing in several school entertainments.

Campbell was appointed a pupil teacher on probation at Palmer's Island public school in 1896. She was promoted to teacher at Grafton in June 1898.

Grafton matriculated and gained entry to the University of Sydney in 1903. In the third year of her Bachelor of Arts her name appeared on the order of merit for English, French and history and she was awarded her degree in April 1907.

She was next appointed to Wagga Wagga, Petersham, Grafton and Fort Street high schools, before taking over as headmistress at West Maitland High School in 1914.

In 1919 Campbell was appointed the second headmistress of Sydney Girls High School (SGHS), taking over from Lucy Garvin who had led the school for 35 years since its inception in 1883. In 1921 she oversaw the school's move from its original site in Elizabeth Street in the city to the newly built premises at Moore Park, on the site of the former zoo.

Campbell was patron of the committee set up to organise celebrations for SGHS's 50th anniversary, including a Jubilee Ball in July, an inter-denominational service, a birthday dinner for 500 and a garden party in school grounds in October 1933.

Campbell was awarded the King George VI Coronation Medal in 1937.

She retired from SGHS in December 1941 after 23 years' service.
