= Australia national squash team =

Australia national squash team may refer to:

- Australia men's national squash team
- Australia women's national squash team
