= Sydney Girls High School =

Location
- Moore Park, Sydney, New South Wales; Australia; 33°53′39″S 151°13′14″E

Information
- Type: Government-funded single-sex academically selective secondary day school
- Motto: Latin: Labor Omnia Vincit (Work Conquers All)
- Established: 1883; 143 years ago
- Educational authority: NSW Department of Education
- Principal: Rachel Powell
- Years: 7–12
- Gender: Girls
- Enrolment: c. 930 (2024)
- Campus: Urban
- Colours: Chocolate brown and sunshine yellow
- Brother School: Sydney Boys High School
- Website: sydneygirl-h.schools.nsw.gov.au

Sydney Girls High School (abbreviated as SGHS or Sydney Girls) is a government-funded single-sex academically selective secondary day school located at Moore Park, in Sydney, New South Wales, Australia.

Established in 1883 and operated by the New South Wales Department of Education and Communities, as a school within the Port Jackson Education Area of the Sydney Region, the school has approximately 930 students from Years 7 to 12.

== History ==
Sydney Girls High School was originally a division of Sydney High School in 1883. The building had two storeys walled off, with male occupancy on the first floor, and female occupancy on the second. The founding head mistress was Miss Lucy Wheatley-Walker (later Mrs Lucy Garvin). She was a recent English emigrant.

Because of high noise pollution from transport and other activities, female operations relocated to a different location and established modern-day Sydney Girls High School. The male division became Sydney Boys High School The two adjacent streets, Anzac Parade and Cleveland Street, are both large and busy roads that make classrooms noisy from time to time.

In 1921, SGHS moved to the former Sydney Zoo (now Taronga Zoo in Mosman, New South Wales) site, which was formerly known as the "Billy Goat Swamp". It is opposite Moore Park, Fox Studios, and the Sydney Cricket Ground. The new building incorporated many modern features, provided large areas of greenery and was quieter. The bear pit from Sydney Zoo still stand between the paddock between Sydney Boys High School and Sydney Girls High School. Notably, another bear pit lies near the canteen area in Sydney Boys High School and has been designated a prefect workspace. SGHS students supported the war effort on the home front in both World War I and World War II by organising care packages and knitting socks and other clothing items for the soldiers on the front.

In April 1999, a severe hailstorm in Sydney caused significant damage to the school grounds, destroying areas of the roof and causing water leakage into many of the classrooms.

== Academics ==
=== Enrolments ===
The Year 7 intake is of 150 students, on the basis of academic merit, as assessed by the Selective High School Placement Test.

In Years 7 to 10, the cohorts consist of 150 students each year; in Years 11 to 12, however, the cohorts consist of up to 180 students each year.

=== Departments ===
SGHS teaches the following subjects for the Higher School Certificate:

- English
  - English Advanced
  - English Extension 1
  - English Extension 2
- Mathematics
  - Mathematics Advanced
  - Mathematics Extension 1
  - Mathematics Extension 2
- Science
  - Biology
  - Chemistry
  - Physics
  - Science Extension
- Drama
- Economics
- Engineering Studies
- History
  - Ancient History
  - Modern History
  - History Extension
- Information Processes and Technology
- Languages Other Than English (LOTE)
  - Chinese
    - Chinese Heritage
    - Chinese Extension
  - French
    - French Continuers
    - French Extension
  - Japanese
    - Japanese Continuers
    - Japanese Extension
  - Latin
    - Latin Continuers
    - Latin Extension
- Legal Studies
- Music
  - Music 1
  - Music 2
  - Music Extension
- Textiles and Design
- Visual Arts
- Visual Design (Year 11 Only)

For some subjects, clubs are formed for extension or to cater to specific interests within the subject. These include Art Club, Astronomy Club, Book Club, Coding Club, Social Justice Club, Maths Club, Film Club, Robotics Club, and Sustainability Club.

== Grounds, buildings, and facilities ==
=== Margaret Varady Rowing Facility ===
Since 1987, the SGHS Rowing Club has shared space with the UNSW Rowing Club and operated its rowing activities using the UNSW boatshed at Tarban Creek, near the Tarban Creek Bridge, Gladesville at Huntleys Point, New South Wales. Her Excellency, Professor Marie Bashir AC, CVO, Governor of NSW and 'old-girl' formally opened the new boatshed on 28 June 2009.

The SGHS section of the boatshed was named the Margaret Varady Rowing Facility in honour of the contribution made by the former principal Margaret Varady towards schoolgirl rowing, including having been instrumental in securing the land and funding to build the boatshed.

=== Ethel Turner Memorial Library ===
The Ethel Turner Memorial Library, named in honour of the novelist Ethel Turner who was in the first enrolment in 1883, includes senior study and group work seminar rooms. The library is also a prime presentation space. Within the library precincts are non-fiction and fiction books, graphic novels, books in foreign languages to assist in LOTE study, and the school Archives.

=== The Governor’s Centre ===
Completed in 2021, the Governor’s Centre, shared with Sydney Boys High School, is a multi-story performing arts centre. It is used for music showcases, musical theatre performance, plays etc. The upper level is used for conferences and exams and is often rented to members of the public.

== Co- and extracurricular activities ==
=== Debating and public speaking ===
SGHS has an extensive debating tradition, and all students are provided the opportunity to develop their skills through weekly coaching and debating or speaking sessions, both social and competitive. SGHS competes in Combined High Schools (CHS) debating competitions and regularly has social debates with other schools, including Sydney Boys High School; Sydney Grammar School; the Scots College; and St. Joseph's College, Hunters Hill.

In 2004, 2005, 2016, 2022, 2023, 2025 and 2026 SGHS won the Hume Barbour Trophy for the Premier's Debating Challenge. In 2012, 2013, 2015, 2018, 2019 and 2020 SGHS won the Karl Cramp Trophy for the Year 11 Premier's Debating Challenge. In 2006, 2016 and 2022 SGHS won the Teasdale Trophy for the Year 9 and 10 Premier's Debating Challenge. In 2000, 2009, 2012 and 2025 SGHS won the Lloyd Cameron Cup for the Year 7 and 8 Premier's Debating Challenge. In 2010 and 2014, SGHS students won the Plain English Speaking Award.

=== Sport ===
Sydney Girls High School has a long tradition of sports, in addition to academic scholarship and offers students a range of extra-curricular sports, including athletics, badminton, basketball, chess, cricket, cross country running, fencing, hockey, rowing, snow sports, table tennis, volleyball, water polo, and netball.

These sports are offered both within the school and at an inter-school level. Students compete in the CHS competitions for many of the above sports, including athletics, cross country running, swimming, and rowing. Further sports are offered for within school education, such as zumba, yoga, archery, and quidditch. SGHS also holds three sports carnivals each year for Swimming, Cross Country, and Athletics.

==== Rowing ====
SGHS crew at the Head of the River 2011

The SGHS Rowing Club (SGHSRC) competes in competitions including the Schoolgirl Head of the River, the Riverview Gold Cup and the NSW Combined High Schools Regatta and has had successes in these competitions. The SGHSRC also hosts and competes in its own regatta, the schoolgirl SGHS Regatta, held at Iron Cove in late November each year. Many girls also win NSWCHSSA Blues for their achievements in rowing.

At the inaugural Schoolgirl Head of the River Regatta in 1991, the SGHSRC won the overall point score, as well as winning the races for the eight, the coxless quad scull, the coxless pair, the novice four and the coxed four; with the Senior 1st IV. The eight also won in the 1991 Head of Parramatta. The SGHS eight won the Schoolgirl Head of the River in 1992 and 1994, when it was held at Iron Cove.

In 2006 and 2007 the Senior 1st IV won the Schoolgirl Head of the River. In 2011 the Senior 1st IV can second in the Schoolgirl Head of the River. The rowing club also won the overall point score at the 2014 NSW CHS Regatta. In the 2015 Head of Parramatta, the coxed quad sculls won first and second place in the schoolgirl quad race.

=== Performing arts ===
SGHS has several dance groups, drama ensembles, and music groups, and a student-run Technical Company that oversees lighting and sound for school assemblies and performances. Annually, the Year 11 drama class put on a major production, which in 2009 was the Pulitzer-winning play Harvey. The school has an annual musicale and Christmas concert, which showcase the musical and dancing talent of students. SGHS also hosts a biennial musical co-production with Sydney Boys High, which in 2015 was the Tony Award winning Guys and Dolls.

With regards to drama, there are junior and senior co-curricular Drama Ensembles, an annual Shakespeare Festival in which students perform Shakespeare excerpts, and a "7/10 Director's Project" where Year 10 Drama students direct 10-minute plays starring Year 7 students. Further, SGHS is a serious contender in the annual Schools Theatresports Competition, their senior team achieving 2nd place and their junior team achieving 3rd place in the 2009 grand finals.

SGHS has a wide range of musical ensembles and bands, including:

- Choir
- Senior Vocal Ensemble
- Junior Strings Ensemble
- Orchestra
- Chamber Orchestra
- Junior Wind Ensemble
- Symphonic Wind Ensemble
- Jazz Band
- Saxophone Ensemble

Many Year 12 SGHS students are invited to perform at the HSC Showcases onSTAGE and Encore.

=== Philanthropy ===
To support Oxfam, SGHS hosts an annual charity fundraiser. For each try scored during a touch football game played between Year 11 and Year 12 girls, ten dollars is donated to the charity.

Further, SGHS has been a large contributor to Stewart House, which has recognised the school's efforts with a Roy Reidy Trophy as the top contributor for the 16th year in a row. In 2011 the school was awarded the Norman B Ridge Red Cross Shield for collecting the largest amount of money for the Red Cross Calling. The Year Groups of 8, 9, and 10 each go out in the CBD and collect money for charities, with Year 8 collecting for Jeans for Genes Day, Year 9 collecting for the Cancer Council Daffodil Day, and Year 10 collecting for the Red Cross Calling and Legacy.

SGHS publishes an Imagizine, a compilation of student-submitted poetry, short stories, and artworks; the proceeds from which are donated to the Black Dog Institute. The body behind Imagizine meets every Thursday and is open to all current SGHS students.

SGHS also has Knitting in Company and Environment Group. Knitting in Company is an activity held after school, during which students knit blankets that are then donated to Wrap with Love, a charity that provides blankets to people who are susceptible to hypothermia. Environment Group involves weekly meetings during which students tend to the school's vegetable gardens and discuss environmental issues. The Environment Group is also responsible for promoting the annual Green Day.

The school also has a Social Justice Club that meets weekly and takes on a new social justice project each term – past projects include LGBT rights, mental illness awareness, refugee aid, and global women's rights.

=== Other opportunities ===
Like many Australian schools, SGHS encourages students to take part in the Duke of Edinburgh's Award, offering a school-organised hike to Year 9 students for the Expedition component of the award. In addition, SGHS participates in numerous academic competitions including the Da Vinci Decathlon and Tournament of Minds. In the 2013 'Race Around the Renaissance' Da Vinci Decathlon, SGHS came first. In the 2015 Tournament of Minds, SGHS won the Maths & Engineering division, and gained honours in the Social Sciences division.

With regards to overseas tours, students are often offered the opportunity to travel to China, France, Japan, Germany, and Italy. This is often for LOTE or ancient history study. There is also a student exchange program set up with Beijing Normal High School in China, The Lycée Paul Cézanne in France, and the Konan Girls High School in Japan.

There is also a SGHS cadet program at Sydney Boys High School.

== School traditions ==
=== Leadership ===
Each year, a team of Year 12 prefects are elected by the student body (excluding Year 7). The prefect executive is made up of the school captain, vice captain, senior prefect, welfare captain, and Student Representative Council (SRC) captain. There are also Prefects for each grade as well as for interest areas such as Sport, Welfare, Public Relations, Co-curricular, Community Service and CAPA. The SRC is made up of elected representatives from each grade from Years 7 to 11. The SRC duties include welcoming school visitors at events, leading and facilitating fundraising events, helping at the school canteen, and organising the annual Junior Dance that is open to SGHS and SBHS students Years 7 to 9. There is also a Leadership Award Program in which students fulfil criteria based on academic achievement, sport participation, co-curricular achievement, and community service. There are bronze, silver, gold, and school medal levels to the Program.

Additionally, there is a Peer Support Program where Year 10 students work with Year 7 students to help them get to know the school and become leaders within the school community. New students are allocated a buddy in their class who provides practical assistance and advice about the school.

=== Houses ===
As with most Australian schools, SGHS utilises a house system. Students are allocated to a house when they enter the school according to Technology classes. There are four different houses under which students compete for the Swimming, Athletics and Cross Country Carnivals:

House name	Colour	Namesake
Campbell	Red	Florence Campbell, second headmistress of Sydney Girls
Garvin	Blue	Lucy Arabella Stocks Garvin, first headmistress of Sydney Girls
Moore	Yellow	Helena Moore, headmistress 1969–73
Macquarie	Green	Governor Lachlan Macquarie

With the exception of Macquarie, all of the houses are named after former principals of the school.

=== Entering and leaving the school ===
At the start of the academic year, the school holds an assembly and “claps in” the new cohort of year sevens, clapping while they walk down the hall to signify their induction into the school. At the year 12 graduation assembly, the students are “clapped out” to signify the end of their time at the school.

== Principals ==
Years	Principal
1883–1918	Lucy Arabella Stocks Garvin
1919–1941	Florence Campbell
1942–1947	Lilian Geer
1948–1954	Lilian McMahon
1955–1960	Lily Preston
1961–1968	Doreen Wayne
1969–1973	Helena Moore
1974–1976	Elizabeth Mattick
1977–1991	Dorothy Shackley
1992–2008	Margaret Varady
2009–2024	Andrea Connell
2024–	Rachel Powell

== Notable alumnae ==
=== Entertainment, media and the arts ===
- Mena Kasmiri Abdullah – writer
- Glenda Adams (Felton) – novelist and short story writer, best known as the winner of the 1987 Miles Franklin Award for Dancing on Coral
- Dorothy Alison – actor
- Patricia Thelma Amphlett OAM (a.k.a. Little Pattie) – National President of the Media, Entertainment and Arts Alliance; Singer/Performer
- Suzanne Baker – film producer, first Australian woman to win an Academy Award
- Marjorie Faith (Marjory) Barnard – author
- Hilary Bell – playwright
- Lucy Bell – actor
- Natasha Liu Bordizzo – actor and model
- Zora Bernice May Cross – writer
- Ellen Dymphna (Nell) Cusack – author
- Marele Day – author
- Justine Ettler – author
- Margaret Fink – film producer
- Tanya Halesworth – TV presenter
- Libby Hathorn – children's author
- Enid Olive Mary Moodie Heddle – author, editor, and publisher of children’s books
- Sacha Horler – actor
- Justine Clarke – actor/children's entertainer
- Myfanwy Horne – journalist, writer, reviewer and book editor
- Rebecca Huntley – writer, social commentator, researcher, radio cohost
- Ida Emily Leeson – librarian
- Jeannie Lewis – singer/actor/writer
- Kate Lilley – academic and poet
- Rachael Maza Long – actor, Artistic Director, Ilbijerri Theatre
- Marie Louise Hamilton Mack – writer
- Gwenyth (Gwen) Valmai Meredith – playwright and author, "Blue Hills"
- Madoline (Nina) Murdoch – writer
- Dora Ohlfsen-Bagge (1869–1948) – sculptor
- Jessica Rowe – journalist and TV presenter
- Christina Ellen Stead – author
- Muriel Myee Steinbeck – actor
- Ethel Turner – author, wrote "Seven Little Australians"
- Lilian Wattnall Burwell Turner – author and journalist
- Julia Zemiro – actor, comedian and TV presenter

=== Medicine and science ===
- Agnes Elizabeth Lloyd Bennett – pioneering medical practitioner and scientist; in 1894, the first woman to graduate with honours in Science at the University of Sydney (also attended Cheltenham Ladies' College, Dulwich Girls' High School and Abbotsleigh)
- Iza Frances Josephine Coghlan – one of the first female graduates in medicine in New South Wales
- Elsie Jean Dalyell – pathologist; with two other women, graduated Bachelor of Medicine with First-Class Honours in 1909, the first women in the Faculty at University of Sydney.
- Lucy Edith Gullett – medical practitioner and philanthropist
- Florence Violet McKenzie (Granville) OBE – first woman Electrical Engineer in Australia and Ham Radio Operator
- Ruby Payne-Scott – Australia's first radio-physicist
- Vicki Rubian Sara – scientist, researcher, academic and Chancellor of the University of Technology Sydney (2004–2016)
- Claire Weekes – zoologist and physician

=== Politics, public service and law ===
- Kath Anderson – politician
- Winsome Hall Andrew – architect
- Marie Bashir – first female Governor of New South Wales; former Chancellor of the University of Sydney; psychiatrist
- Coral Bell – academic and expert on international relations
- Ada Beveridge – Country Women's Association leader
- Freda Brown – activist, journalist and political candidate
- Gina Cass-Gottlieb – attorney and government official
- Totti Cohen – solicitor and former president of the Federation of P&C Associations
- Eva Cox – writer, feminist, sociologist, social commentator and activist
- Emily Crawford – professor of international law, winner of the Max Planck-Cambridge Prize for International Law
- Barbara Darling – Bishop and teacher
- Robin Dunster – nurse and former chief of staff of the Salvation Army International (first woman to hold the office)
- Ada Evans – first woman in Australia to gain law degree but not permitted to practise
- Marie Fisher – politician
- Libby Hathorn – author
- Anna Katzmann – Judge of the Federal Court of Australia
- Delcia Kite – politician
- Irene Longman – politician and community worker
- Eleanor MacKinnon (1871–1936) – Red Cross leader
- Lyndel Prott – lawyer and legal academic
- Lee Rhiannon – MLC NSW Greens (School Vice-Captain 1969)
- Lucinda Mary Turnbull – businesswoman, philanthropist, former local government politician, Lord Mayor of Sydney 2003–2004 (first woman to hold the position)
- Jan Wade – Attorney General, barrister, Commissioner, lawyer, legal academic, Minister, Parliamentarian

=== Sport ===
- Edith Cochrane – 1956 Melbourne Olympics, Flat water – LK1500 m Kayak Single
- Mary Breen – Olympic athlete
- Tracy Brook – 1988 Calgary Olympics aged 17 (25th/31) National Women's Figure Skating Champion
- Thelma Dorothy Coyne – champion tennis player
- Jessi Miley-Dyer – junior world champion surfer
- Pat Norton – Olympic swimmer 1936 Berlin games (age 16); gold medal for 110 yards backstroke, silver medal in 100 yards Freestyle Relay, Bronze in 100 yards Medley Relay at 1938 Empire Games Sydney.
- Jane Saville – Olympic Walker 1996, 2000 and 2004
- Julie Speight – Olympic Cyclist, 1988 Seoul Olympics (5th place); first Australian woman to compete at an International track championship

=== Other ===
- Dorothy 'Dot' Butler (née English) – bushwalker, mountaineer, and conservationist.
- Jane Sinclair Reid (1883–1968) – educator who specialised in teaching blind students.

== See also ==
- List of government schools in New South Wales
- List of selective high schools in New South Wales
