= Lucy Garvin =

British-Australian headmistress (1851–1938)

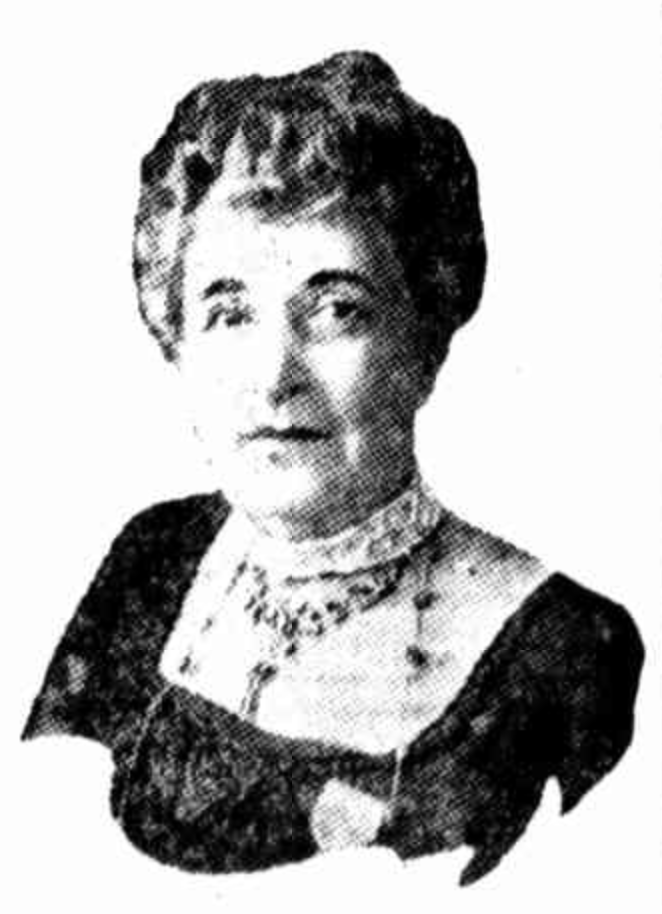
- Garvin in 1921
- Born: Lucy Arabella Wheatley-Walker; 28 January 1851; England
- Died: 20 January 1938 (aged 86); Meols, Cheshire, England
- Occupation: headmistress
- Employer: Department of Public Instruction
- Known for: founding head of Sydney Girls High School
- Spouse: William Charles Garvin
- Children: three

Lucy Arabella Stocks Garvin born Lucy Arabella Wheatley-Walker (28 January 1851 – 20 January 1938) was a British-Australian headmistress. She was the founding head of Sydney Girls High School in 1883 and served as its first principal until her retirement in 1919.

== Life ==
Lucy Wheatley-Walker was born at Douglas on the Isle of Man on 28 January 1851. Her parents were Catherine (née Stocks, c.1818 -1887) and Frederick Bayley Wheatley-Walker (c. 1818–1900). Her father's career was recorded as "gentleman". Lucy was the youngest of four children who included Catherine Mary (c. 1842–1923), John Fredrick (1843–1916) and Arthur Greaves (1846–1926). By the time Lucy was ten, the family was living in Croydon in Surrey. In 1868 Lucy emigrated to Sydney Australia with her mother, father and sister aboard the Canaan. Lucy Wheatly-Walker became a teacher. She taught the ‘higher’ English classes from 1878 to 1880 at Brussels College for young ladies in Balmain, Sydney, run by Henrietta Foott. She was afterwards briefly governess to the family of the Reverent James Jefferis before 1883.

In 1883 SGHS opened in a two-storey building in Elizabeth Street in Sydney. The building had been the St James Denominational School. The upper floor of the new school was reserved for the first 39 girls, while the boys were on the ground floor. Lucy Wheatley-Walker was chosen from 22 applicants to the first headship of Sydney Girls High School, with a starting salary of £400 a year. She started in October and by January the next year the school's roll had more than doubled to 87.

Lucy Wheatly-Walker was a tireless worker and rarely took sick leave. Her marriage to William Charles Garvin, 30, a draftsman, occurred during the school vacation on 23 June 1891 at St Jude's Church, Randwick. The couple had three sons, one of whom tragically died in infancy. In 1898 her young husband also died, leaving Lucy Garvin the sole provider of her family and a growing school to run. During the succeeding years, she opposed fees, which were finally abolished in 1911, and always sought more and better accommodation and facilities. Mrs Garvin served as principal for 35 years, the last eight on yearly contracts. She was third on the List of 96 senior women teachers in NSW despite having no formal qualifications. Her contribution to French language studies was officially recognised by the French Government with the award of Officier d’Académie in 1918.

During the first world war she encouraged the girls to raise money for war related causes. She was an enthusiastic advocate for the British Empire. She left the school in 1919. She was replaced by the Australian born Florence Campbell. Garvin became the head of St Chad's Church of England Girls' School in the Sydney suburb of Cremorne until 1922.

Throughout her long career at SGHS, Lucy Garvin participated in professional organisations, including as a foundation member of the NSW Teachers' Association established in 1891. In 1900-1901 she served as vice president and remained an “active and committed” member for the length of her teaching career. She also served as President of the Women's Suffrage League, and was a member of the Women's Literary Society and Classical Association. Upon her retirement she was the first Honorary Life Member of the Headmistresses Association, formed in Sydney in 1916.

Lucy Garvin travelled from Australia for some years before finally returning to England in May 1928, at 73 years old. She died on 20 January 1938 at Meols, Wirral Cheshire. The Sydney Morning Herald noted of her death that ‘her life was one of faithful service, high ideals and dignified scholarship.’
