= Katrin Aladjova =

Bulgarian-Australian chess player (born 1971)

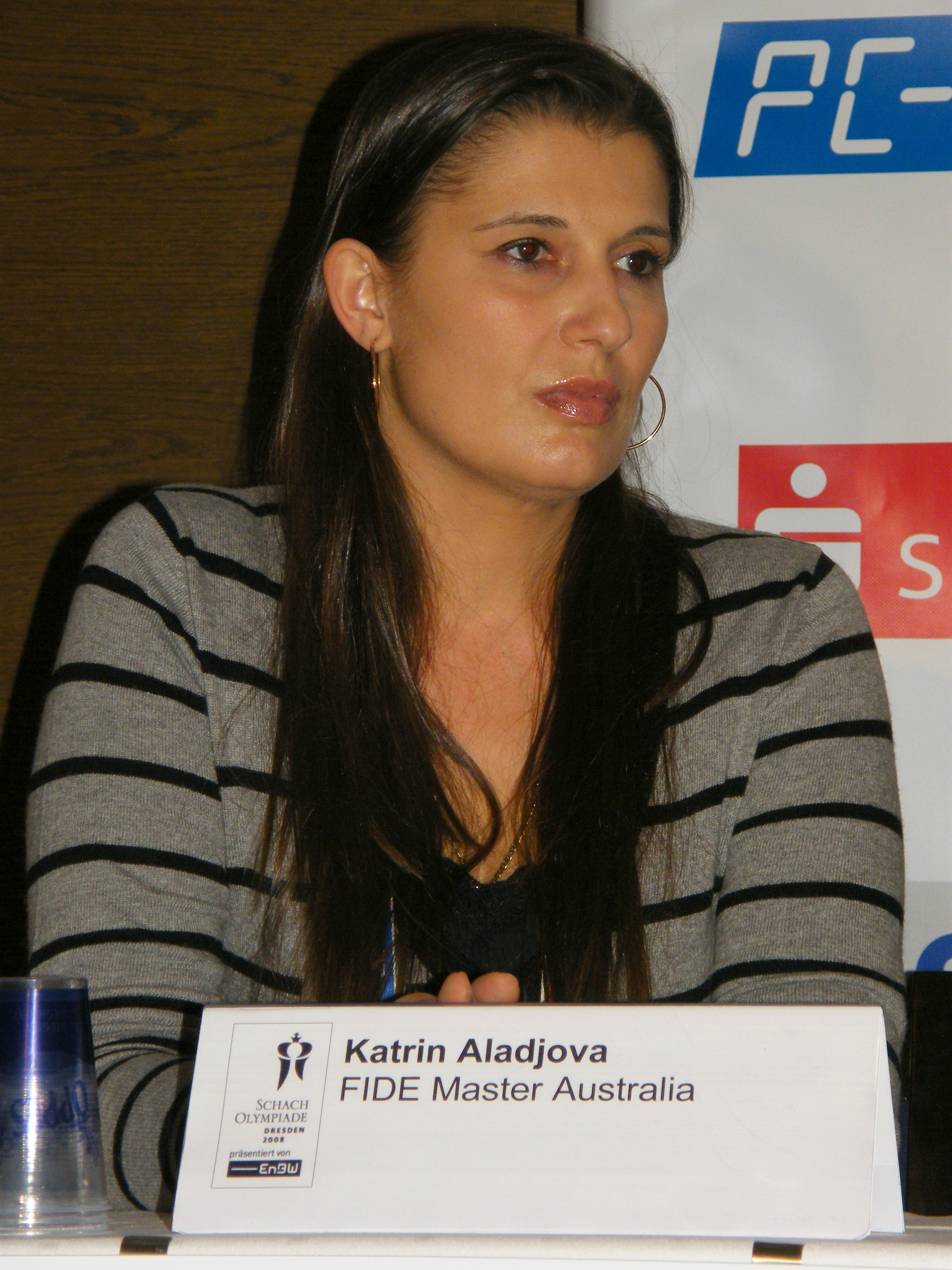
- Katrin Aladjova at a press conference during the 38th Chess Olympiad in Dresden, Germany 2008.

Personal information
- Born: 21 June 1971 (age 55) Sofia, Bulgaria

Chess career
- Country: Bulgaria (until 1992); Australia (since 1992)
- Title: Woman FIDE Master (1987)
- FIDE rating: 2115 (July 2007)
- Peak rating: 2145 (July 1992)

Katrin Aladjova (born Katrin Peneva Aladjova, Bulgarian Катрин Пенева Аладжова, listed with FIDE as Katrin Aladjova; 21 June 1971 in Sofia, Bulgaria) is a Bulgarian-Australian chess Woman FIDE Master (WFM).

She was 1986 World Under-16 Girl's Chess Champion and 1989 World Under-18 Girl's Chess Champion.

== Chess career ==
In 1986 she won the Under-16 World Youth Chess Championship (Girls) in Río Gallegos, Argentina and gained the title of Woman FIDE Master (WFM). In this event she scored 9.5/11 winning from Ketevan Kakhiani on tiebreak, and finishing half a point ahead of Judit Polgar.

In 1989 she won the Under-18 World Youth Chess Championship (Girls) in Aguadilla, Puerto Rico.

Aladjova won the 1992 Australian Women's Chess Championship in Melbourne, Australia. She also won other women's chess events in Australia in 1993 and 1994, before retiring as a professional tournament chess player.

In May 2007, Aladjova was invited as a guest dignitary and commentator for the M-Tel Masters super-GM chess tournament in Sofia, and was interviewed by the French GM Robert Fontaine for Europe Echecs.

Katrin was President of Chess Victoria from 2007 to November 2009. Since 2013 she has been a Chess Victoria Ambassador and a board member. She continues to promote the game of chess providing peer support to young chess players in her state of Victoria particularly women of all ages in Australia who enjoy playing the game of chess.

== Personal life ==
Aladjova learnt chess from her father when she was six years old. In 1989, she married and moved to Melbourne Australia. Katrin was appointed as a Director of the Board of "VITS LanguageLink". Her appointment was endorsed by Cabinet and was ratified by Governor in Council on 24 April 2012. She served on the Board of Directors until May 2016. She is also an ambassador for the Victorian Government's Vision for Language Education – Love of Language program.

== Notable games ==
- Katrin Aladjova vs Utut Adianto, Australian Open 1990, Zukertort Opening: Symmetrical Variation (A04), 0-1
- Katrin Aladjova vs Alisa Galliamova, Weliko 1990, King's Indian Attack: Spassky Variation (A05) 1-0
