= Women's field hockey in Australia =

Women's field hockey in Australia began informally in New South Wales and Tasmania from as early as 1901, with the first team developed in Sydney in 1903. Soon after, Women's field hockey began to be played in schools, universities and eventually developed state and national teams. Women's field hockey was eventually represented by the Australian Institute of Sport, though it did not receive the same support as the men's field hockey. The Australia women's national field hockey team (nicknamed the Hockeyroos), established in 1914, has placed highly in many competitions.

== History ==
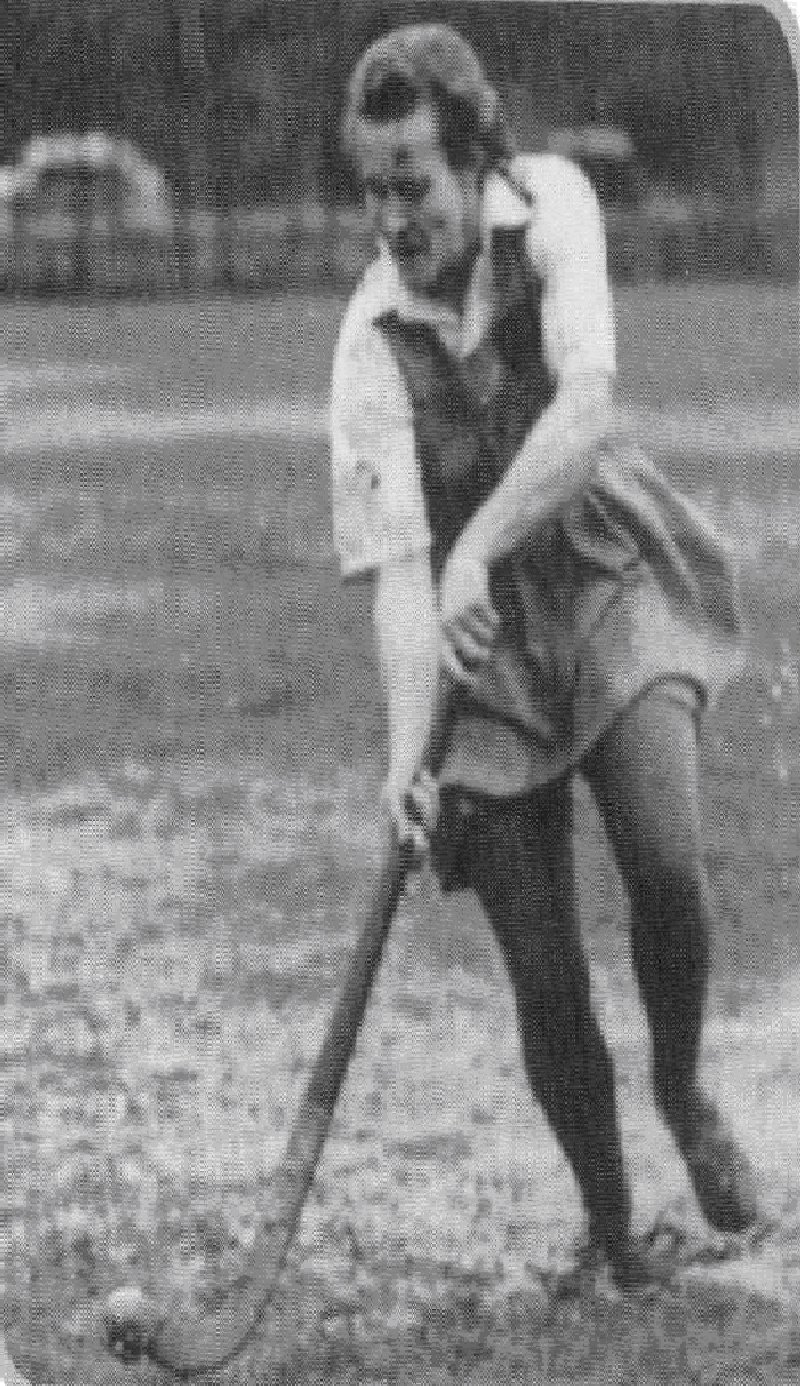
May Campbell, Australian Field hockey player

The first women's field hockey team founded in Australia was the Wandah Club. This club was based out of Sydney and was created in 1903. It was founded by Miss Clubbe and her sister. Later that year, after the club was founded, school based began to be played in Hobart and Sydney girls' schools. That year also saw the creation of clubs in New South Wales, Tasmania and South Australia. Women's hockey in Australia predates this on an informal, non-club level. Women were informally playing field hockey in New South Wales, South Australia and Tasmania by 1901. Field hockey began to be played by women in Melbourne in 1907.

In 1934, the Victorian Women's Centennial Sports Carnival was held. The event was organised by the Victorian Women's Amateur Sports Council and held at the Melbourne Cricket Grounds. The purpose was to increase women's interest in sport by providing them opportunities to play. Sports that were included on the programme included cricket, field hockey, women's basketball, bowls, rowing, swimming, athletics, rifle shooting, baseball, golf, tennis and badminton. There were over 1,000 bowlers involved over the course a week. Cricket featured a match versus a visiting English side. Women's basketball featured a Victorian side playing against a representative all Australian side. There was a day for watersports such as swimming and rowing. A tennis tournament was held. A field hockey tournament featuring Australian, Kiwi and Fijian teams was played.

Australian women's sports had an advantage over many other women's sport organisations around the world in the period after World War II. Women's sport organisations had largely remained intact and were holding competitions during the war period. This structure survived in the post war period. Women's sport were not hurt because of food rationing, petrol rationing, population disbursement, and other issues facing post-war Europe.

In January 1981, the Australian Institute of Sport opened. Field hockey, men's or women's, was not a sport that was part of the original group of sports represented by the institute. The sport was later included, with women being represented in equal numbers to their male peers. While the representation by gender would later be similar, space issues at the Australian Institute of Sport prevented some development when compared to the men's game. Hockey was originally based at the Australian Institute of Sport at a Perth-based headquarters. This arrangement was done with agreements between the institute, the Commonwealth government and the government of Western Australia. When hockey was first included at AIS, an initial committee was created which included a chairman from AIS, an AHA representative, an AWHA representative, a representative from WAIT, a representative from Western Australia's government and a sports medicine representative. At the onset, sixteen male players were awarded scholarships but zero female players were.

Women's state teams have historically been coached by men. This means that there are many similarities in the style of play between the men and women's style of play on the local, state and national level.

== Governance ==
The governance of women's field hockey in Australia began in 1907, when a New South Wales association was created. National governance came about on 2 July 1910 when the All Australian Women's Hockey Association was created. The first president of this organisation was Gwynneth Morris of Victoria. The national organisation became an affiliate of the All England Women's Hockey Association right away. Marie Montgomerie Hamilton who had led the New South Wales Hockey Association for over twenty years became the All-Australia chair from 1932 to 1934 and again from 1945 to 1954.

In 2000, Women's Hockey Australia merged with the Australian Hockey Association to form Hockey Australia.

In 1933, the New South Wales Amateur Women's Sport Council was created by Gwendolen Game. The organisation brought together all the women's sporting bodies on the state level. Sports represented included New South Wales's women's field hockey, cricket, women's basketball, baseball, rowing and vigoro. A similar organisation covering similar sports had been created in Victoria in 1931.

== Schools and university ==
A university field hockey team for women was first established at the University of Queensland in 1912.

In 1922, a committee in Australia investigated the benefits of physical education for girls. They came up with several recommendations regarding what sports were and were not appropriate for girls to play based on the level of fitness required. It was determined that for some individual girls that for medical reasons, the girls should probably not be allowed to participate in tennis, netball, lacrosse, golf, hockey, and cricket. Soccer was completely medically inappropriate for girls to play. It was medically appropriate for all girls to be able to participate in, so long as they were not done in an overly competitive manner, swimming, rowing, cycling and horseback riding.

== Interstate ==
The first interstate match in Australia occurred in 1909 when a New South Wales representative side competed against a representative Victorian side in Melbourne. The first interstate tournament occurred the following year at a competition in Rushcutters Bay, Sydney. Representative sides from Tasmania, South Australia, Victoria and New South Wales competed.

An interstate competition was held to determine the national champions starting in 1946. In the period between 1946 and 1967, Western Australia's team claimed sole victory in all but five years. Those years they did not win sole victory include 1948 where they shared the top with New South Wales, 1954 when New South Wales won, 1956 when the competition was not held, 1961 when Queensland won, and 1965 when they shared victory with South Australia.

State sides have historically been very competitive, making national team selection very difficult as the level of play is very high. An example of the level of competition being high on the state side can be found in 1983 when a South Australian representative side beat the Indian national team that was doing a tour of the country.

== International ==
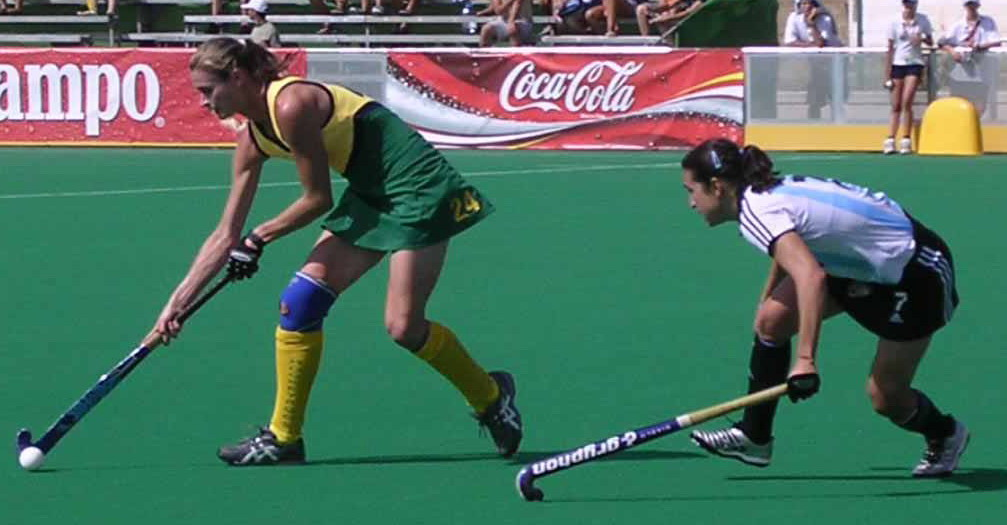
An Australian handles the ball in a match against Argentina in 2005

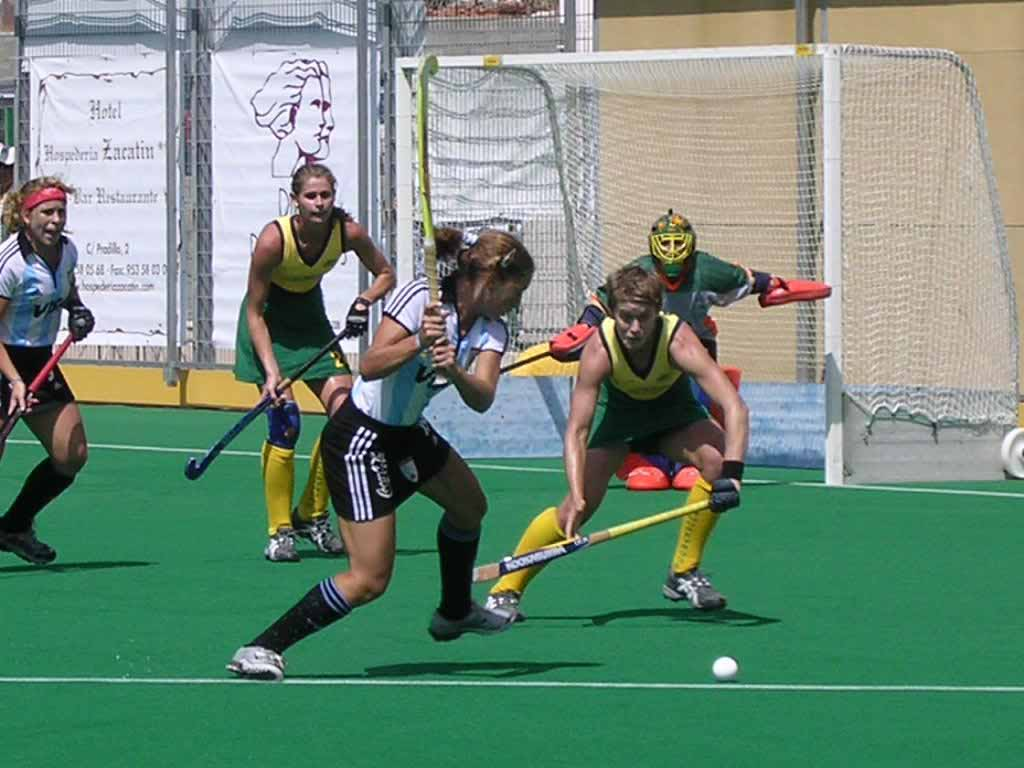
ARGENTINA vs. AUSTRALIA, 2005

the Australia women's national field hockey team (nicknamed The Hockeyroos) played its first game in 1914 against the England XI team. This was the first international match that Australia competed in. The English made an appearance in the country on a trip to New Zealand and played only one game. An English representative team was the first international team to tour Australia. They did this tour in 1927, playing three test matches, an inter-state tournament and matches in every Australian state. England won every game they played during this 1927 tour.

Florinda Katharine Ogilvie led the All Australia Women's Hockey Association from 1926 and in 1930 she went with them when they undertook their first international tour. Australia played their first international match on foreign soil that year when they went to South Africa and Rhodesia to compete in an Empire tournament. At the conclusion of this tournament, the team went on a tour of the United Kingdom and continental Europe. Australia made their first appearance in a World Championship competition in 1936 in the tournament held in the United States. Australia had their first victory against England in 1953. They beat England 2 goals to 1. This victory occurred at the 5th International Tournament that was held in England that year. In 1959, Australia won their first international tournament: The 1959 Holland Tournament.

In 1967, the Australian women's national team completed a tour of ten countries in a period of four months, playing thirty-one games and only losing five. That same year, they competed in the 9th World Championship where they finished in the top four alongside national teams from South Africa, England and the Netherlands. The Australian women participated in the first Women's World Cup for field hockey that was held in 1979. The team finished fourth. During the late 1970s and early 1980s, Australia and New Zealand were both leading women's field hockey nations that were competitive with their European counterparts. In 1981, the Australians won the America's Cup, the first year this competition was held. That same year, the team also competed in the 1981 version of the World Cup. They finished fourth. In 1982, the Australians competed in a New Zealand tournament featuring teams from the Netherlands, the United States, New Zealand, Canada and England. The team finished second. That year, the team also competed in the New Zealand Tournament. They finished second.

The process for qualifying for the 1984 Summer Olympics depended on a team's performance at the 1983 World Cup. The 1983 World Cup was also a significant event for Australian women's field hockey because it was the first World Cup that was governed by the International Hockey Federation, an international governing body that for the first time represented both sexes. The World Cup was held in April in Kuala Lumpur. Australia was in pool A with Scotland, the United States, Wales, the Netherlands and India. Players for the team included Lorraine Wharton. Players for the team included Lorraine Wharton and Elspeth Clement. The team was coached by Brian Glencross. Elspeth Clement was the second leading scorer in the tournament, scoring seven goals, three less than Jane Swinnerton of England who scored ten. The Australians led in penalty scorners awarded in the tournament, with seventy-one, where they converted nine of them into goals. Australia finished tied with England for first in the tournament for penalty strokes award with three. They converted only one of those, compared to England's two. On the first day, Australia beat Wales five to zero. On the third day, Australia beat India by a score of three to two. On the fourth day, Australia tied Scotland one all. On day six, the Netherlands beat Australia one to zero. On day six, the Netherlands beat Australia one to zero. On day seven, Australia tied the American team one all. On day ten during the semi-finals, Australia tied Canada zero to zero. Extra time was played. The game was still a tie. The game went to penalty strokes, which Canada won eight to five. On day twelve, Australia played in the Bronze Medal match and beat Germany by a score of three to one. The Australian team finished third.

Between 1931 and 1983, Australia's national team has finished first in twice, second five times, third six times and fourth three times in international competitions. During that same time period, Australia's women have competed in sixty-two test matches, where they won twenty-seven, drew eleven and lost twenty-four matches. The team has one three Olympic gold medals (1988, 1996, 2000), two World Cup gold medals (1994, 1998), six Champions Trophies (1991, 1993, 1995, 1997, 1999, 2003) and three Commonwealth Games gold medals (1998, 2006, 2010).

== Popularity ==
In 1940, a study of 314 women in New Zealand and Australia was done. Most of the women in the study were middle class, conservative, Protestant and white. The study found that 183 participated in sport. The ninth most popular sport that these women participated in was field hockey, with 3 having played the sport. The sport was tied with billiards, chess, fishing, croquet, horse racing, squash, table tennis and shooting.

== Uniforms ==
Early field hockey uniforms in the 1900s and 1910s consisted of high-button shoes, ankle length skirts and long sleeved button up shirts.

== People ==
One of the important people in developing women's field hockey in Australia was Louie Wilkie.

- Rechelle Hawkes
- Alyson Annan
- Nikki Hudson
- Madonna Blyth
- Jodie Kenny
- Emily Chalker
- Georgina Morgan

== See also ==
- Netball in Australia
- Women's association football in Australia
- 1998 Women's Hockey International Challenge
- 1999 Women's Hockey International Challenge
- 2000 Women's Hockey International Challenge
- 2002 Women's Hockey International Challenge

== Bibliography ==
- Evening Post (19 December 1922). "Women in Print". Evening Post. Vol. CC, no. 147. New Zealand: National Library of New Zealand. p. 7.
- Howell, Max; Howell, Reet; Brown, David W. (1989). The Sporting Image, A pictorial history of Queenslanders at play. Brisbane: University of Queensland Press. ISBN 0-7022-2206-2.
- Pollard, Jack (1968). AMPOL book of Australian Sporting Records. Sydney: The Pollard Publishing Co. OCLC 71140.
- Stell, Marion K. (1991). Half the Race, A history of Australian women in sport. North Ryde, Australia: HarperCollins. ISBN 0-207-16971-3.
- Tronson, Mark (1984). Esanda's World Hockey. Wallacia, Australia: International Field Hockey Publishing Co. ISBN 978-0-9591102-0-3. OCLC 27616070.
