= Women's croquet in Australia =

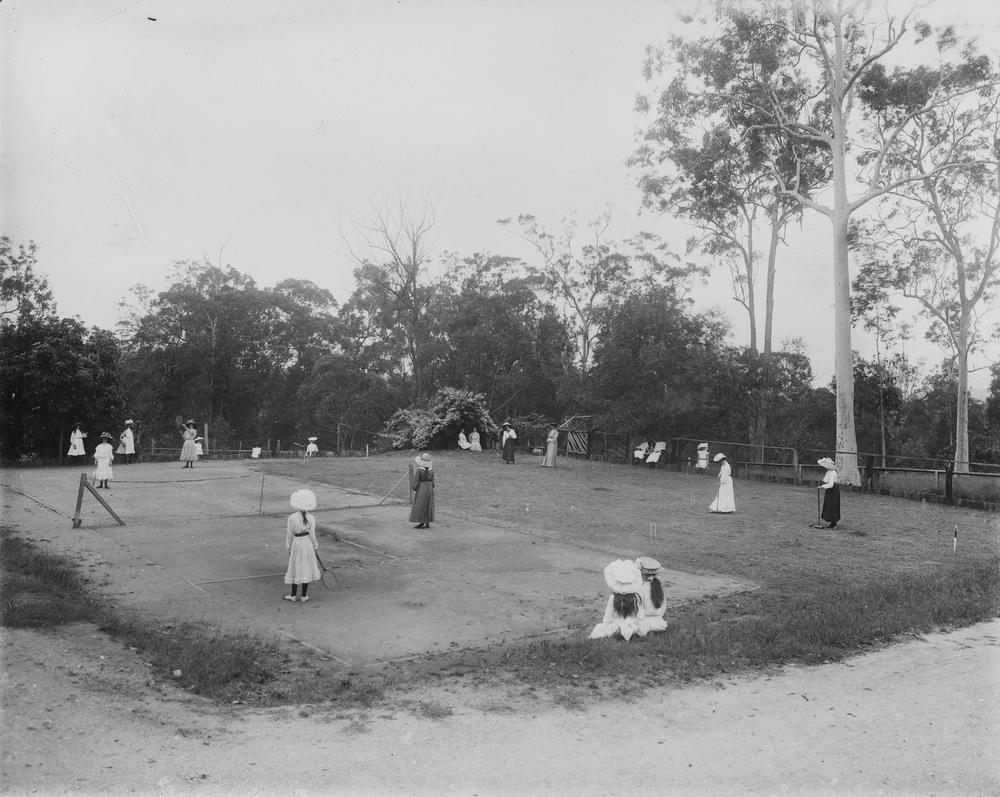
- Young girls playing tennis, ca. 1900. Young girls are playing tennis in the foreground while women are playing croquet in the background.
- Country: Australia
- National team: Australia

Croquet has historically been a sport in Australia where men and women were able to compete on a level playing field.

While not being urged to avoid competition, women had few opportunities to compete in sport in Australia until the 1880s. After that date, new sporting facilities were built around the country and many new sports clubs were created. The sport of croquet was played by Australian women as early as 1881 in Queensland. The sport was viewed as acceptable because it was not seen as an overly competitive one. Tournaments were held for female enthusiasts of the sport. These tournaments were events at which to socialise, where refreshments and cakes were sold. One of the reasons women were encouraged to play croquet, tennis and golf during the late 19th century was because it was seen as beneficial to their health. These sports were also seen as passive, non-aggressive, and non-threatening to the period's concepts of masculinity and femininity.

Croquet became part of the women's physical education curriculum during the 1880s. The largest area to adopt this sport in the curriculum was in Victoria at schools like MLC Kew, which borrowed heavily from a British sporting tradition. At some schools, there were purpose built croquet courts.

In Australia and Queensland's early colonial history, tennis and croquet were acceptable sports for society women to participate in. During that period, women wore big hats and dresses that covered their arms and legs. The sport became a popular one for women around 1890. There were organised competitions for women at All Hallows Convent in Queensland during the 1920s.

By the 1910s, there were many women playing that sport manufacturers began to see the power of creating advertising targeting them. Ads for women's golf, tennis and croquet appeared in such publications as the Bulletin and the Brisbane Girls' Grammar Magazine.

In 1940, a study of 314 women in New Zealand and Australia was done. Most of the women in the study were middle class, conservative, Protestant and white. The study found that 183 participated in sport. The sixth most popular sport that these women participated in was croquet, with 9 having played the sport.

Australian women's sports had an advantage over many other women's sport organisations around the world in the period after World War II. Women's sport organisations had largely remained intact and were holding competitions during the war period. This structure survived in the post war period. Women's sport were not hurt because of food rationing, petrol rationing, population disbursement, and other issues facing post-war Europe. This gave Australian women a competitive advantage during the post war era.

== See also ==
- Netball in Australia
- Women's soccer in Australia
- Women's field hockey in Australia

== Bibliography ==
- Cliff, Paul, ed. (1999). A sporting nation, Celebrating Australia's sporting life. Canberra, Australia: National Library of Australia. ISBN 0-642-10704-1.
- Howell, Max; Howell, Reet; Brown, David W. (1989). The Sporting Image, A pictorial history of Queenslanders at play. Brisbane: University of Queensland Press. ISBN 0-7022-2206-2.
- Stell, Marion K. (1991). Half the Race, A history of Australian women in sport. North Ryde, Australia: HarperCollins. ISBN 0-207-16971-3.
