= Women's cue sports in Australia =

Women's cue sports in Australia is a sporting topic that has received some Australian media coverage since the early 20th century. Coverage began with English billiards and today is more often about the sport of snooker and various pool games such as eight-ball.

== History ==
Up until 1984 and the passage of the Commonwealth Sex Discrimination Act and state passed Equal Opportunity Acts, many sporting clubs were single sex. Those that were not often made it difficult for women to participate in a club by prohibiting them from playing billiards and snooker at a club, setting hours that made it difficult for women to play and not allowing them to be on the board of club or having voting privileges at a club.

== English billiards ==
English billiards in particular is one of several sports Australian women were noted as infrequently playing in the first half of the 20th century, but with encouragement from male professionals. The game enjoyed some popularity because of its connections to England. A daily competitive billiards match between two local women were reported as a human interest story in a South Australian newspaper in 1911. and an amateur women's tournament was held in 1931.

However, in 1940, a study of 314 women in New Zealand and Australia showed less than 1 per cent of respondents played the game. Most of the women in the study were middle class, conservative, Protestant and white. The study found that 183 participated in sports. Billiards was tied with eight other activities as the ninth most popular sports in which these women participated, with 3 having played the sport.

Ruby Roberts was an Australian professional billiards player during the 1910s and 1920s. She returned to Australia in 1926.

In 1931, the Canberra Times, in reporting on the advent of an amateur women's championship, asked why there were no great female billiards players. Also that year, an Adelaide newspaper quoted Australian champion Walter Lindrum, one of the world's top billiards players, as saying that women should be able to be competitive with men at the sport. Observing increasing popularity of billiards among women in England, Lindrum was supportive of more opportunities for female Australian players. Again in 1936, the retiring Lindrum tried to interest Australian women in taking up the sport.

== Snooker ==
As of 2002, Australia had a national amateur women's snooker team. In 2009, the team competed against New Zealand in a test series, and won, 25–23. The inaugural Trans Tasman Test was played at the Penrith Panthers Club in 1997 between Australia (K.Parashis;T.Cantoni;L.Lucas;J.McCullough;S.Ridley) & New Zealand (L.Field;M.Woods;A.Moeahu;S.Wilkie;T.Gealey;C.Baillie;J.Woods) with NZ totally annihilating Australia. However, Australia redeemed themselves taking the Trans Tasman Test the next 3 consecutive years.

The 2009 ABSC/IBSF Australian Open Women's Snooker Championship was won by Kathy Parashis of Australia. Only one Australian, 17-year-old Queenslander Jessica Woods, made the 2010 semi-finals.

== Pool ==
The amateur APPF/WEPF 2011 Ladies' Eight-ball Championship was won by Lyndall Hulley.

Tammy Cantoni of Victoria, a multiple-time women's Australian national title-holder in both pool and snooker, and the runner-up in the 2009 open (mixed-gender) division of the Australian Nine-ball Championship, won the 1998 WPA World Nine-ball Championship (women's division).
