= Belgrade International Women's Grandmaster Chess Tournament =

Women's chess tournament in Serbia

The Belgrade International Women's Grandmaster Chess Tournament is an annual women's round-robin chess tournament held in Belgrade, Serbia each March in honour of International Women's Day. The tournament was first staged in 1965 and has been held largely uninterrupted every year since. The tournament has had some prominent winners, most notably five-time Women's World Champions Nona Gaprindashvili and Maia Chiburdanidze. Gaprindashvilli won the tournament seven times, and in 1971 in particular she won with a perfect score of 13/13.

== Winners ==
No	Year	Winner
1	1965	Edit Bilek (HUN)
2	1966	Nona Gaprindashvili (USSR); Alexandra Nicolau (ROU)
3	1967	Tatiana Zatulovskaya (USSR)
4	1968	Nona Gaprindashvili (USSR)
5	1969	Nana Alexandria (USSR)
6	1970	Alla Kushnir (USSR)
7	1971	Nona Gaprindashvili (USSR)
8	1972	Alexandra Nicolau (ROU); Milunka Lazarevic (YUG)
9	1973	Alexandra Nicolau (ROU)
10	1974	Nona Gaprindashvili (USSR)
11	1975	Zsuzsa Verőci (HUN); Valentina Kozlovskaya (USSR); Antonina Georgieva (BUL)
12	1976	Nona Gaprindashvili (USSR)
13	1977	Zsuzsa Verőci (HUN); Irina Levitina (USSR)
14	1978	Nona Gaprindashvili (USSR)
15	1979	Nana Aleksandria (USSR)
16	1981	Ludmila Zaitseva (USSR)
17	1982	Elena Akhmilovskaya (USSR)
18	1983	Zsuzsa Verőci (HUN)
19	1985	Svetlana Matveeva (USSR)
20	1986	Nino Gurieli (USSR)
21	1987	Marta Litinskaya (USSR); Svetlana Matveeva (USSR)
22	1989	Zsuzsa Verőci (HUN)
23	1990	Nino Gurieli (USSR); Nataša Bojković (YUG); Margarita Voyska (BUL)
24	1991	Nona Gaprindashvili (USSR)
25	1992	Maia Chiburdanidze (GEO)
26	1993	Irina Umanskaya (RUS)
27	1994	Alisa Galliamova (RUS)
28	1995	Svetlana Prudnikova (RUS)
29	1996	Maia Chiburdanidze (GEO)
30	1997	Ana Benderać (YUG)
31	1998	Natalia Zhukova (UKR)
32	1999	Gordana Marković (YUG)
33	2000	Ekaterina Kovalevskaya (RUS)
34	2001	Irina Chelushkina (YUG)
35	2002	Irina Chelushkina (YUG)
36	2003	Svetlana Prudnikova (SCG)
37	2005	Ljilja Drljević (SCG); Irina Chelushkina (SCG); Gabriela Olărașu (ROU); Svetlana Petrenko (MDA)
38	2006	Svetlana Petrenko (MDA)
39	2007	Svetlana Petrenko (MDA)
40	2008	Nataša Bojković (SRB)
41	2009	Ana Benderać (SRB)
42	2010	Jovana Erić (SRB)
43	2011	Irina Chelushkina (SRB)
44	2012	Ana Benderać (SRB)
45	2013	Sabrina Vega Gutierrez (ESP)
46	2014	Sabrina Vega Gutierrez (ESP)
47	2015	Marija Rakic (SRB)
48	2016	Margarita Schepetkova (RUS)
49	2017	Elena Tomilova (RUS)
50	2018	Jovana Rapport (SRB)
51	2019	Aleksandra Dimitrova (RUS)
52	2020	Lu Miaoyi (CHN)
53	2022	Andreea Navrotescu (FRA)
54	2023	Anastasiya Rakhmangulova (UKR)
55	2024	Aleksandra Maltsevskaya (POL)
