= 35th Chess Olympiad =

2002 chess tournament in Bled, Slovenia

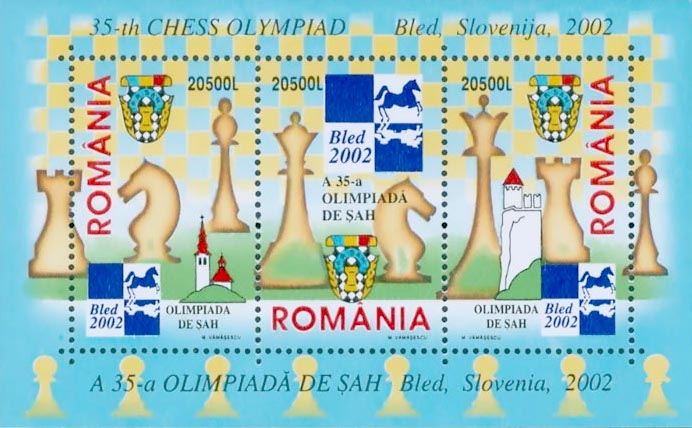
A 2002 Romanian stamp sheet featuring the logo of the 35th Chess Olympiad (center-top)

The 35th Chess Olympiad (Slovene: 35. Šahovska olimpijada), organized by the Fédération Internationale des Échecs and comprising an open and women's tournament, took place between October 25 and November 11, 2002, in Bled, Slovenia. There were 135 teams in the open event and 90 in the women's event.

Both tournament sections were officiated by international arbiter Geurt Gijssen (Netherlands). Teams were paired across the 14 rounds of competition according to the Swiss system. The open division was played over four boards per round, whilst the women's was played over three. In the event of a draw, the tie-break was decided by 1. The Buchholz system; and 2. Match points.

The time control for each game permitted each player 90 minutes for all their moves, with an additional 30 seconds increment for each player after each move, beginning with the first.

In addition to the overall medal winners, the teams were divided into seeding groups, with the top finishers in each group receiving special prizes.

== Open event ==
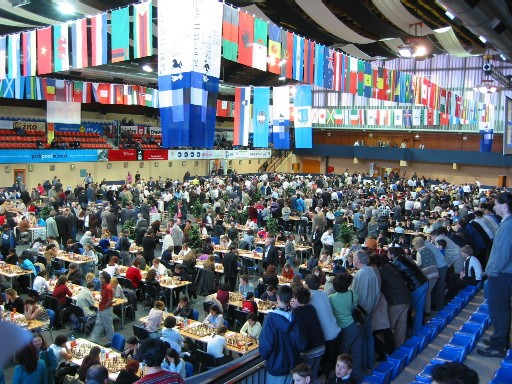
The playing hall in Bled

The open division was contested by 135 teams representing 130 nations. Slovenia, as hosts, fielded three teams, whilst the International Braille Chess Association (IBCA), the International Physically Disabled Chess Association (IPCA), and the International Committee of Silent Chess (ICSC) each provided one squad. Sudan were signed up but never arrived.

Both reigning world champions, Vladimir Kramnik (classical) and Viswanathan Anand (FIDE), were absent from the tournament. Meanwhile, the Russian team with two ex-champions, Kasparov and Khalifman, won their sixth consecutive title. Hungary and Armenia took silver and bronze, respectively.

Open event
#	Country	Players	Average rating	Points	Buchholz
1	Russia	Kasparov, Grischuk, Khalifman, Morozevich, Svidler, Rublevsky	2734	38½	
2	Hungary	Lékó, Polgár, Almási, Gyimesi, Ruck, Ács	2674	37½	
3	Armenia	Akopian, Lputian, Asrian, Sargissian, Minasian, Anastasian	2620	35	
4	Georgia	Azmaiparashvili, Sturua, Mchedlishvili, Jobava, Izoria, Gagunashvili	2590	34	
5	China	Ye Jiangchuan, Xu Jun, Zhang Zhong, Bu Xiangzhi, Ni Hua, Zhang Pengxiang	2633	33½	456.5
6	Netherlands	Van Wely, Sokolov, Tiviakov, Van den Doel, Nijboer, Ernst	2648	33½	454.5
7	England	Adams, Short, Speelman, McShane, Conquest, Emms	2640	33½	450.5
8	Slovakia	Movsesian, Ftáčnik, Timoščenko, Markoš, Maník, Plachetka	2561	33	445.0
9	Israel	Gelfand, Smirin, Sutovsky, Psakhis, Avrukh, Huzman	2660	33	439.5
10	Yugoslavia	Ljubojević, Damljanović, Ivanišević, Kovačević, Ilinčić, Pikula	2548	33	436.0

#	Country	Average rating	Points	Buchholz	MP
11	North Macedonia	2543	33	430.5	
12	Switzerland	2561	33	427.5	
13	Poland	2600	32½	451.0	
14	Ukraine	2665	32½	459.5	
15	Bosnia and Herzegovina	2576	32½	447.5	
16	Germany	2626	32½	446.5	
17	Belarus	2570	32½	442.0	
18	Czech Republic	2578	32½	438.5	
19	Spain	2567	32½	433.5	
20	Uzbekistan	2566	32½	431.0	
21	Lithuania	2548	32	435.0	
22	Iceland	2498	32	422.0	
23	Croatia	2558	31½	445.0	
24	France	2610	31½	441.5	
25	Greece	2540	31½	433.5	
26	Denmark	2554	31½	425.5	
27	Bulgaria	2545	31½	421.5	
28	Romania	2590	31	448.5	
29	India	2561	31	441.0	
30	Azerbaijan	2575	31	436.0	
31	Moldova	2543	31	431.0	
32	Sweden	2583	31	430.0	
33	Canada	2492	31	423.5	
34	Bangladesh	2453	31	414.5	
35	Brazil	2561	31	411.0	
36	Ireland	2458	31	408.0	
37	Cuba	2576	30½	433.0	
38	Italy	2470	30½	426.0	17
39	Philippines	2502	30½	426.0	14
40	Slovenia	2591	30½	425.0	
41	United States	2620	30½	422.0	
42	Latvia	2540	30½	416.5	
43	Estonia	2530	30½	414.5	
44	Belgium	2425	30½	414.0	
45	Finland	2442	30½	411.0	
46	Kazakhstan	2516	30	428.5	
47	Vietnam	2513	30	415.0	
48	Norway	2511	30	412.5	
49	Scotland	2491	30	412.0	
50	Indonesia	2425	30	409.5	
51	Mexico	2420	30	399.5	
52	Colombia	2452	29½	408.5	
53	Australia	2482	29½	407.0	
54	Egypt	2403	29½	402.0	
55	Qatar	2367	29½	399.0	
56	Iraq	2310	29½	394.5	
57	Portugal	2459	29½	389.5	
58	Tajikistan	2421	29½	337.0	
59	Peru	2430	29	406.5	
60	Chile	2419	29	394.0	14
61	Iran	2429	29	394.0	11
62	Slovenia "B"	2351	29	390.0	
63	Argentina	2534	28½	421.5	
64	Austria	2391	28½	411.5	
65	Venezuela	2373	28½	401.0	
66	Paraguay	2405	28½	397.0	
67	Ecuador	2386	28½	396.0	
68	Luxembourg	2273	28½	394.5	
69	Turkmenistan	2402	28	418.5	
70	Costa Rica	2380	28	394.0	
71	Andorra	2339	28	390.5	
72	Kyrgyzstan	2404	28	387.5	
73	Albania	2411	28	384.0	
74	Lebanon	2282	28	383.0	
75	Malaysia	2224	27½	390.0	15
76	Turkey	2348	27½	390.0	13
77	Bolivia	2325	27½	389.5	
78	Cyprus	2304	27½	383.0	
79	Singapore	2399	27½	373.5	
80	Slovenia "C"	2416	27	399.5	
81	Wales	2280	27	393.0	
82	Zambia	2303	27	390.5	
83	Dominican Republic	2336	27	385.0	
84	Mongolia	2372	27	381.0	
85	Uruguay	2309	27	380.5	
86	ICSC	2371	27	376.5	
87	IBCA	2296	27	368.0	
88	New Zealand	2335	27	366.5	
89	Angola	2247	26½	387.0	
90	Thailand	2227	26½	372.0	
91	Ethiopia	2067	26½	350.0	
92	United Arab Emirates	2289	26	386.0	
93	Faroe Islands	2304	26	383.0	
94	Algeria	2290	26	382.0	
95	IPCA	2336	26	381.5	
96	Yemen	2148	26	357.0	
97	Nigeria	2125	26	326.5	
98	Trinidad and Tobago	2210	25½	361.0	
99	Liechtenstein	2065	25½	350.0	
100	Tunisia	2323	25	382.0	
101	Sri Lanka	2213	25	368.5	
102	Zimbabwe	2049	25	367.5	
103	South Africa	2303	25	366.0	
104	Barbados	2227	25	357.0	
105	Libya	2054	25	347.5	
106	Malta	2184	25	345.0	
107	Bahrain	2122	25	344.0	
108	Monaco	2220	24½	364.0	
109	Japan	2037	24½	351.5	
110	Netherlands Antilles	2089	24½	326.5	
111	Botswana	2146	24	368.0	
112	Mauritania	2034	24	346.5	
113	Suriname	2203	24	345.5	
114	Jamaica	2230	23½	361.5	
115	Uganda	2069	23½	360.5	
116	Palestine	2136	23½	351.5	
117	Jersey	2086	23½	332.5	
118	Nicaragua	2225	23	354.5	
119	Honduras	2014	23	347.5	
120	Namibia	2059	23	340.5	13
121	Hong Kong	2043	23	340.5	11
122	Panama	2017	23	317.0	
123	Kenya	2054	23	300.0	
124	Afghanistan	2000	23	278.0	
125	Brunei	2000	22½	327.5	
126	Aruba	2000	22½	323.5	
127	San Marino	2024	22½	275.5	
128	British Virgin Islands	2005	22		
129	Somalia	2000	21½	302.0	
130	Papua New Guinea	2044	21½	287.5	
131	Macau	2179	21½	282.5	
133	Bermuda	2007	17½		
133	Guernsey	2048	17		
134	Rwanda	2000	15½		
135	United States Virgin Islands	2000	11½		

=== Individual medals ===
- Performance rating: (Russia) Garry Kasparov 2933
- Board 1: (Zimbabwe) Robert Gwaze 9 / 9 = 100.0%
- Board 2: (Monaco) Jean-Philippe Gentilleau 7 / 9 = 77.8%
- Board 3: (Indonesia) Cerdas Barus 8½ / 10 = 85.0%
- Board 4: (Bahrain) Maher Ayyad 8 / 10 = 80.0%
- 1st reserve: (United Arab Emirates) Jassim Saleh 6½ / 7 = 92.9%
- 2nd reserve: (Republic of Ireland) Sam Collins 7½ / 8 = 93.8%

Gwaze is one of two players to have recorded the "highest" perfect score at an Olympiad with 9 points in 9 games (the other was Alexander Alekhine in 1930).

== Women's event ==
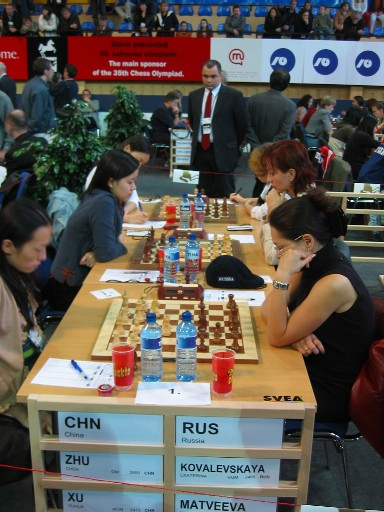
Women's match: China v Russia

The women's division was contested by 90 teams representing 85 nations. Slovenia, as hosts, fielded three teams, whilst the International Braille Chess Association (IBCA), the International Physically Disabled Chess Association (IPCA), and the International Committee of Silent Chess (ICSC) each provided one squad. Afghanistan and Tunisia were signed up but never arrived.

China were only narrow favourites on rating this time but still won their third consecutive title, led by reigning world champion Zhu Chen and future champion Xu Yuhua. Russia and Poland took the silver and bronze medals, respectively.

#	Country	Players	Average rating	Points	Buchholz
1	China	Zhu Chen, Xu Yuhua, Wang Pin, Zhao Xue	2485	29½	
2	Russia	Kovalevskaya, Matveeva, Kosteniuk, T. Kosintseva	2462	29	
3	Poland	Radziewicz, Dworakowska, Soćko, Kądziołka	2388	28	
4	Georgia	Chiburdanidze, Ioseliani, Khurtsidze, Arakhamia-Grant	2481	27½	
5	Hungary	Vajda, Dembo, Lakos, Gara	2363	25½	343.0
6	Ukraine	Zhukova, Vasilevich, Zatonskih, Gaponenko	2424	25½	334.5
7	Yugoslavia	Bojković, Prudnikova, Chelushkina, Benderać	2403	25½	334.0
8	Azerbaijan	Velikhanli, Shukurova, Z. Mamedyarova, T. Mamedyarova	2269	25½	317.0
9	United States	Krush, Baginskaite, Shahade, Donaldson-Akhmilovskaya	2381	25	349.0
10	Czech Republic	Jacková, Krupková, Sikorová, Ptáčníková	2316	25	341.0

#	Country	Average rating	Points	Buchholz	MP
11	Bulgaria	2412	24½	348.5	
12	Vietnam	2357	24½	346.5	
13	Israel	2283	24½	309.5	
14	Romania	2404	24	347.5	
15	Armenia	2345	24	335.0	
16	Germany	2382	24	334.0	
17	Slovakia	2310	24	332.5	
18	England	2364	24	318.5	
19	India	2325	23½	338.5	
20	Netherlands	2353	23½	317.5	
21	Iran	2176	23½	307.0	
22	Turkmenistan	2214	23½	297.5	
23	Greece	2302	23	335.0	
24	France	2396	23	328.5	
25	Croatia	2233	23	322.0	
26	Argentina	2218	23	309.0	
27	Spain	2273	23	302.0	
28	Sweden	2172	23	301.0	
29	Kazakhstan	2239	22½	328.0	
30	Cuba	2304	22½	313.5	
31	Belarus	2264	22½	312.0	
32	Moldova	2344	22½	311.0	15
33	Mongolia	2248	22½	311.0	14
34	Lithuania	2202	22½	309.5	
35	Australia	2191	22½	301.5	
36	Uzbekistan	2213	22	310.5	
37	Switzerland	2195	22	301.0	
38	Slovenia	2245	22	296.5	
39	Bosnia and Herzegovina	2147	21½	310.5	
40	Ecuador	2270	21½	298.5	
41	Bangladesh	2100	21½	291.5	
42	Finland	2171	21	304.0	
43	Estonia	2207	21	303.5	
44	Norway	2098	21	296.0	
45	Slovenia "C"	2122	21	297.0	
46	Colombia	2032	21	293.5	
47	Mexico	2091	21	290.0	
48	Singapore	2052	21	286.5	
49	Kyrgyzstan	2108	21	285.5	16
50	Austria	2112	21	285.5	14
51	Turkey	2080	21	283.0	
52	Denmark	2155	20½	305.0	
53	Venezuela	2185	20½	289.5	14
54	Slovenia "B"	2169	20½	289.5	13
55	Scotland	2079	20½	287.5	
56	Brazil	2092	20½	282.5	
57	Peru	1986	20	301.5	
58	Canada	2132	20	300.5	
59	North Macedonia	2127	20	293.0	
60	IBCA	2046	20	291.0	
61	Wales	2023	20	280.5	
62	Malaysia	1995	20	276.5	
63	Albania	1800	20	272.0	
64	Philippines	2174	19½	293.5	
65	Sri Lanka	1800	19½	271.5	
66	Iceland	2016	19	282.5	
67	Algeria	1981	19	277.0	
68	Barbados	1873	19	234.0	
69	South Africa	1800	18½	285.0	
70	Iraq	1903	18½	263.0	
71	Italy	2055	18	271.5	
72	Dominican Republic	1932	18	270.0	
73	IPCA	2165	18	267.0	
74	Costa Rica	1800	18	260.5	
75	Lebanon	1901	18	253.5	
76	Ireland	2047	18	246.5	
77	Puerto Rico	1800	18	242.5	
78	Jamaica	1800	18	240.0	
79	Luxembourg	1899	17½	269.0	
80	ICSC	1800	17½	258.5	
81	Brunei	1800	17½	242.0	
82	Chile	2019	17	249.5	
83	Zimbabwe	1800	17	225.5	
84	Nigeria	1881	16½		
85	Botswana	1963	15½		
86	New Zealand	1873	15		
87	Japan	1956	14	233.0	
88	Angola	1800	14	231.5	
89	Zambia	1800	13		
90	Yemen	1800	8		

=== Individual medals ===
- Performance rating: (China) Zhao Xue 2707
- Board 1: (Vietnam) Hoàng Thanh Trang 8½ / 11 = 77.3%
- Board 2: (Serbia and Montenegro) Svetlana Prudnikova and (Estonia) Leili Pärnpuu 9½ / 13 = 73.1%
- Board 3: (Poland) Monika Soćko 10½ / 13 = 80.8%
- Reserve: (China) Zhao Xue and (Russia) Tatiana Kosintseva 11 / 12 = 91.7%

== Overall title ==
The Nona Gaprindashvili Trophy is awarded to the nation that has the best average rank in the open and women's divisions. Where two or more teams are tied, they are ordered by best single finish in either division and then by total number of points scored.

The trophy, named after the former women's world champion (1961–78), was created by FIDE in 1997.

#	Team	Open division	Women's division	Average
1	Russia	1	2	1½
2	China	5	1	3
3	Hungary	2	5	3½
