= Rapport (disambiguation) =

Rapport is an aspect of unconscious human interaction.

Rapport may also refer to:

== Media ==
- Rapport (newspaper), one of the largest Sunday newspapers in South Africa
- Rapport (TV programme), a Swedish news television programme that airs on SVT

== People ==
- Jovana Rapport (born 1992), Serbian women chess Grandmaster
- Richárd Rapport (born 1996), Hungarian chess Grandmaster

== Other uses ==
- Rapport (software), computer security software
