= Serbian Chess Championship =

The Serbian Chess Championship is held by the Serbian Chess Association.

The first championships were played in 1935 and until 1991 they were the Yugoslav Chess Championship. In 1992 FR Yugoslavia was formed, which changed its name to Serbia and Montenegro in 2003, and the Serbia and Montenegro Chess Championship was played until 2006, when Montenegro left the state union and a Serbian and Montenegrin separate championships were formed.

== Winners ==
No.	Year	Open	Women
1	2007	Miloš Perunović	Anđelija Stojanović
2	2008	Ivan Ivanišević	Anđelija Stojanović
3	2009	Ivan Ivanišević	Sandra Đukić
4	2010	Nikola Sedlak	Anđelija Stojanović
5	2011	Ivan Ivanišević	Jovana Erić
6	2012	Ivan Ivanišević	Marija Rakić
7	2013	Boban Bogosavljević	Maria Manakova
8	2014	Aleksandar Inđić	Jovana Vojinović
9	2015	Dejan Antić	Marija Rakić
10	2016	Miroslav Marković	Ljilja Drljević
11	2017	Ivan Ivanišević	Adela Velikić
12	2018	Aleksandar Inđić	Teodora Injac
13	2019	Ivan Ivanišević	Teodora Injac
14	2020	Aleksandar Inđić	Teodora Injac
15	2021	Velimir Ivić	
16	2022	Velimir Ivić	Irina Chelushkina
17	2023	Aleksandar Inđić	Marina Gajcin
18	2024	Aleksandar Inđić	Irina Chelushkina
19	2025	Ivan Ivanišević	Sofia Pogorelskikh
20	2026	Bojan Maksimović	

== Crosstable ==
Serbian Women Chess Championship 6th Kać 2012
	Player	Rating	1	2	3	4	5	6	7	8	9	0	11	12	Points	TB
1	Marija Rakić (Serbia)	2267	*	1	1	½	½	½	0	1	½	1	1	1	8.0	
2	Anđelija Stojanović (Serbia)	2324	0	*	1	1	0	½	½	1	½	1	1	1	7.5	36.25
3	Maria Manakova (Serbia)	2315	0	0	*	½	½	1	1	½	1	1	1	1	7.5	34.00
4	Jovana Erić (Serbia)	2243	½	0	½	*	½	1	½	½	½	1	1	1	7.0	
5	Suzana Maksimović (Serbia)	2227	½	1	½	½	*	½	½	½	½	0	1	1	6.5	
6	Ljilja Drljević (Serbia)	2278	½	½	0	0	½	*	½	½	½	1	1	1	6.0	
7	Ana Benderać (Serbia)	2294	1	½	0	½	½	½	*	½	1	0	½	½	5.5	
8	Irina Chelushkina (Serbia)	2263	0	0	½	½	½	½	½	*	0	½	½	1	4.5	
9	Sandra Đukić (Serbia)	2203	½	½	0	½	½	½	0	1	*	0	0	½	4.0	
10	Ksenija Tomin (Serbia)	1876	0	0	0	0	1	0	1	½	1	*	0	0	3.5	
11	Anastasija Panić (Serbia)	1967	0	0	0	0	0	0	½	½	1	1	*	0	3.0	12.50
12	Bogdana Nonković (Serbia)	1900	0	0	0	0	0	0	½	0	½	1	1	*	3.0	11.25

Serbian Women Chess Championship 5th Belgrade 2011
	Player	Rating	1	2	3	4	5	6	7	8	9	0	11	12	Points	TB
1	Jovana Erić (Serbia)	2230	*	½	½	½	1	1	1	1	½	1	1	1	9.0	
2	Anđelija Stojanović (Serbia)	2318	½	*	0	½	½	1	1	1	1	1	1	1	8.5	
3	Maria Manakova (Serbia)	2336	½	1	*	1	1	0	½	0	1	1	1	1	8.0	
4	Ana Benderać (Serbia)	2305	½	½	0	*	½	½	½	1	1	1	1	1	7.5	32.50
5	Ljilja Drljević (Serbia)	2295	0	½	0	½	*	½	1	1	1	1	1	1	7.5	30.75
6	Irina Chelushkina (Serbia)	2314	0	0	1	½	½	*	0	½	1	0	1	1	5.5	24.25
7	Suzana Maksimović (Serbia)	2203	0	0	½	½	0	1	*	½	0	1	1	1	5.5	21.00
8	Marija Rakić (Serbia)	2309	0	0	1	0	0	½	½	*	½	1	1	1	5.5	20.50
9	Lena Miladinović (Serbia)	2086	½	0	0	0	0	0	1	½	*	0	1	1	4.0	
10	Kristina Brankov (Serbia)	1898	0	0	0	0	0	1	0	0	1	*	0	1	3.0	
11	Anastasija Panić (Serbia)	1894	0	0	0	0	0	0	0	0	0	1	*	0	1.0	3.00
12	Marija Dragojević (Serbia)	1985	0	0	0	0	0	0	0	0	0	0	1	*	1.0	1.00

Serbian Women Chess Championship 4th Pančevo 2010
	Player	Rating	1	2	3	4	5	6	7	8	9	0	11	12	Points	TB
1	Anđelija Stojanović (Serbia)	2301	*	1	½	½	1	1	1	½	½	½	1	1	8.5	
2	Marija Rakić (Serbia)	2306	0	*	1	½	0	1	1	½	1	1	1	1	8.0	
3	Ljilja Drljević (Serbia)	2248	½	0	*	1	1	1	½	1	½	1	0	1	7.5	39.50
4	Irina Chelushkina (Serbia)	2319	½	½	0	*	1	0	½	1	1	1	1	1	7.5	34.005
5	Marija Petrović (Serbia)	2182	0	1	0	0	*	½	1	1	1	½	1	½	6.5	
6	Jovana Erić (Serbia)	2183	0	0	0	1	½	*	½	½	1	1	1	½	6.0	
7	Ana Benderać (Serbia)	2299	0	0	½	½	0	½	*	1	0	1	1	1	5.5	23.00
8	Sandra Đukić (Serbia)	2214	½	½	0	0	0	½	0	*	1	1	1	1	5.5	22.25
9	Jelena Mladenović (Serbia)	2118	½	0	½	0	0	0	1	0	*	½	½	1	4.0	
10	Ksenija Tomin (Serbia)	1883	½	0	0	0	½	0	0	0	½	*	1	½	3.0	
11	Lena Miladinović (Serbia)	2038	0	0	1	0	0	0	0	0	½	0	*	½	2.0	10.50
12	Katarina Tadić (Serbia)	2152	0	0	0	0	½	½	0	0	0	½	½	*	2.0	8.75
