= Montenegrin Chess Championship =

National chess championship in Montenegro

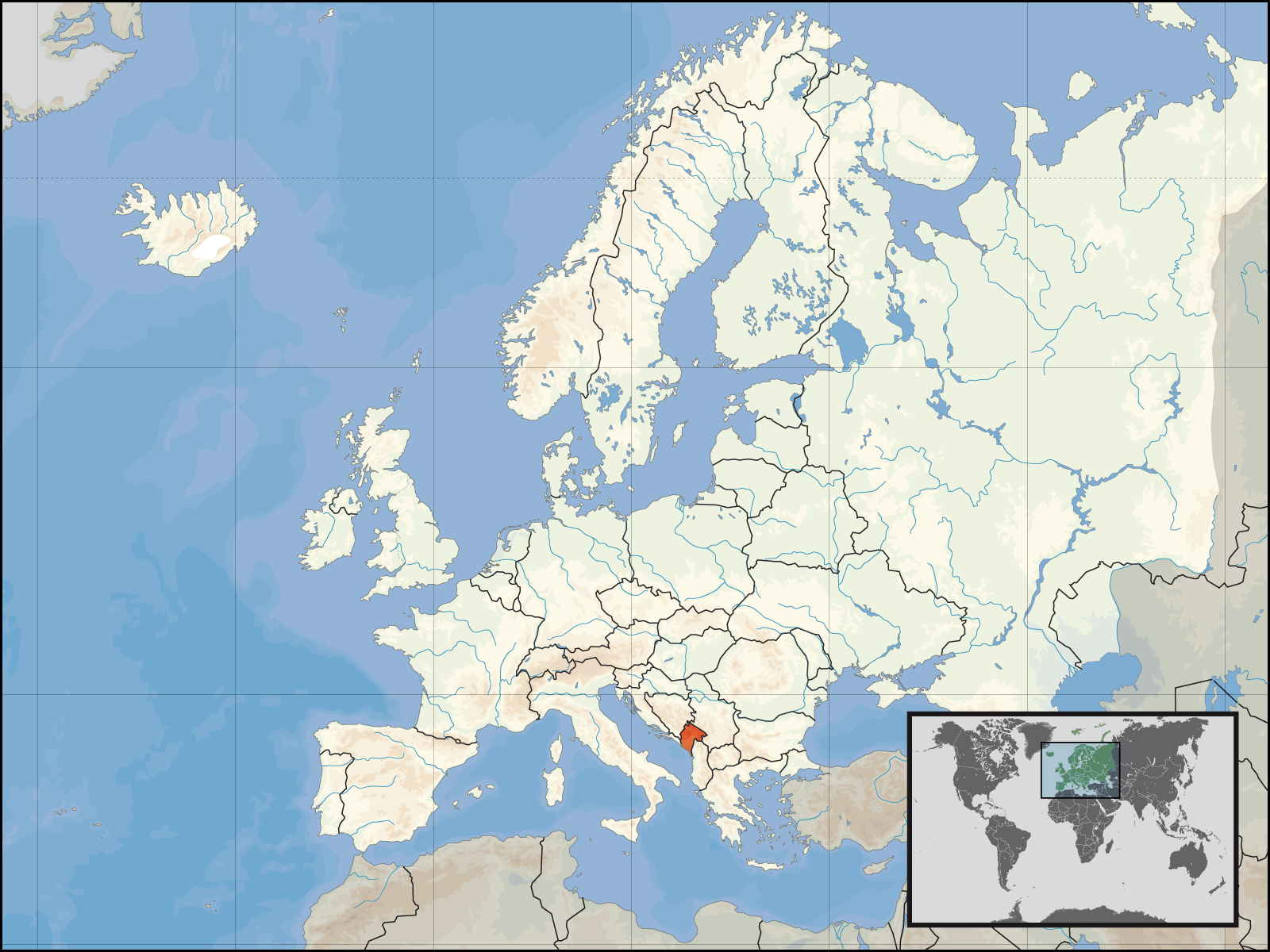
Shield of arms of The Viscount Cowdray

The Montenegrin Chess Championship is organized by the Montenegro Chess Federation.

Montenegro also participated in the Yugoslav Chess Championship until 1991 and the Serbia and Montenegro Chess Championship between 1992 and 2006.

== Men's championship winners ==
No.	Year	Champion
52	2000	Dragiša Blagojević
56	2004	Nikola Djukić
59	2007	Dragiša Blagojević
60	2008	Milan Drasko
61	2009	Dragiša Blagojević
62	2010	Dragan Kosić
63	2011	Nikola Djukić
64	2012	Nikola Djukić
65	2013	Nikola Djukić
66	2014	Nikola Djukić
67	2015	Nikola Djukić
68	2016	Dragan Kosić
69	2017	Nikola Djukić
70	2018	Nikola Djukić
71	2019	Nikola Djukić
72	2020	Blažo Kalezić
73	2021	Luka Drašković
74	2022	Nikola Djukić
75	2023	Dragiša Blagojević
76	2024	Nikita Petrov
77	2025	Nikita Petrov
78	2026	Denis Kadrić

== Women's championship winners ==
No.	Year	Champion
1	2007	Aleksandra Mijović
2	2008	Marija R. Stojanović
3	2009	Jovana Vojinović
4	2010	Jovana Vojinović
5	2011	Aleksandra Mijović
6	2012	?
7	2013	Sanja Misović
8	2014	Nina Delević
9	2015	Nevena Radošević
10	2016	Tijana Blagojević
11	2017	Lidija Blagojević
12	2018	Tijana Rakić
13	2019	

== Crosstable ==
Montenegro Women Chess Championship 5th Podgorica 2011
	Player	Rating	1	2	3	4	5	6	7	8	9	Points	TB
1	Aleksandra Mijović (Montenegro)	2172	*	½	1	½	1	1	1	1	1	7.0	
2	Tijana Blagojević (Montenegro)	1802	½	*	½	1	0	½	1	1	1	5.5	
3	Lidija Blagojević (Montenegro)	1999	0	½	*	½	½	1	½	1	1	5.0	15.25
4	Sanja Mišović (Montenegro)	1857	½	0	½	*	0	1	1	1	1	5.0	15.00
5	Kristina Bačić (Montenegro)	1826	0	1	½	1	*	½	½	0	1	4.5	
6	Milica Bubanja (Montenegro)	1731	0	½	0	0	½	*	1	1	1	4.0	
7	Radmila Milošević (Montenegro)	0	0	0	½	0	½	0	*	½	1	2.5	6.00
8	Maja Čabarkapa (Montenegro)	1914	0	0	0	0	1	0	½	*	1	2.5	5.75
9	Berina Ajanović (Montenegro)	0	0	0	0	0	0	0	0	0	*	0.0	

Montenegro Women Chess Championship 3rd Cetinje 2009
	Player	Rating	1	2	3	4	5	6	7	Points	TB
1	Jovana Vojinović (Montenegro)	2341	*	1	1	1	1	1	1	6.0	
2	Sanja Mišović (Montenegro)	1943	0	*	½	½	1	1	1	4.0	
3	Lidija Blagojević (Montenegro)	2057	0	½	*	½	1	1	½	3.5	
4	Kristina Bačić (Montenegro)	1755	0	½	½	*	0	½	1	2.5	5.50
5	Milica Bubanja (Montenegro)	1738	0	0	0	1	*	1	½	2.5	4.50
6	Tijana Blagojević (Montenegro)	0	0	0	0	½	0	*	1	1.5	
7	Savica Tomović (Montenegro)	1825	0	0	½	0	½	0	*	1.0	
