= Serbia and Montenegro Chess Championship =

The FR Yugoslavia, then Serbia and Montenegro, Chess Championship was organized by the FR Yugoslavia and then Serbia and Montenegro Chess Association.

The FR Yugoslavia Chess Championship succeeded the Yugoslav Chess Championship after Slovenia, Croatia, Bosnia and Herzegovina and Macedonia separated from SFR Yugoslavia and formed their own championships. FR Yugoslavia was renamed into Serbia and Montenegro in 2003. In 2006 Montenegro left the state union, and separate Serbian Chess Championship and Montenegrin Chess Championship were formed.

In 2003 and 2004 championships were not held.

== Winners list (Men) ==
- FR Yugoslavia

No.	Year	Champion
47	1992	Aleksa Striković
48	1993	Miroljub Lazić
49	1994	Milan Vukić
50	1995	Petar Popović
51	1996	Božidar Ivanović
52	1997	Dragoljub Velimirović
53	1998	Miroslav Marković
54	1999	Miroslav Tošić
55	2000	Zlatko Ilinčić
56	2001	Branko Damljanović, Aleksandar Kovačević; Dejan Pikula and Nikola Ostojić
57	2002	Miloš Pavlović

- Serbia and Montenegro

No.	Year	Champion
1	2005	Miloš Perunović
2	2006	Branko Damljanović

== Winners list (Women) ==
- FR Yugoslavia

No.	Year	Champion
45	1992	Sanja Vuksanović
46	1993	Mirjana Marić
47	1994	Irina Chelushkina
48	1995	Nataša Bojković
49	1996	Nataša Bojković
50	1997	Nataša Bojković
51	1998	Nataša Bojković
52	1999	Irina Chelushkina
53	2000	Svetlana Prudnikova
54	2001	Irina Chelushkina
55	2002	Svetlana Prudnikova

- Serbia and Montenegro

No.	Year	Champion
1	2005	Irina Chelushkina
2	2006	Irina Chelushkina
