= Dejan Pikula =

Serbian chess grandmaster (born 1969)

Personal information
- Born: 31 July 1969 (age 56)

Chess career
- Country: Yugoslavia → Serbia
- Title: Grandmaster (2002)
- Peak rating: 2576 (October 2008)

Dejan Pikula (Serbian Cyrillic: Дејан Пикула, born 31 July 1969) is a Serbian chess player who holds the titles of Grandmaster (GM) (2002) and FIDE Trainer (2017). FR Yugoslavia Chess Championship winner (2001).

== Biography ==
In 2001, Dejan Pikula shared 1st place in FR Yugoslavia Chess Championship and awarded national chess champion title. In 2003, he won bronze medal in Serbia and Montenegro Chess Championship. In 2006, Dejan Pikula shared 1st place with Branko Damljanović in Serbia and Montenegro Chess Championship but lost the additional match for champion title. In 2007, he won Central Serbia Chess Championship.

Dejan Pikula played for Yugoslavia in the Chess Olympiad:

- In 2002, at second reserve board in the 35th Chess Olympiad in Bled (+1, =0, −1).

Dejan Pikula played for Serbia "B" team in the European Team Chess Championship:

- In 2009, at third board in the 17th European Team Chess Championship in Novi Sad (+3, =3, −1).

In 2002, Dejan Pikula was awarded the FIDE International Grandmaster (GM). In 2017, he became a FIDE Trainer.
