= Drljević =

Drljević is a surname. Notable people with the surname include:

- Ljilja Drljević (born 1984), Montenegrin and Serbian chess player,
- Sekula Drljević (1884–1945), Montenegrin lawyer and separatist politician.
