= François Fargère =

French chess grandmaster (born 1985)

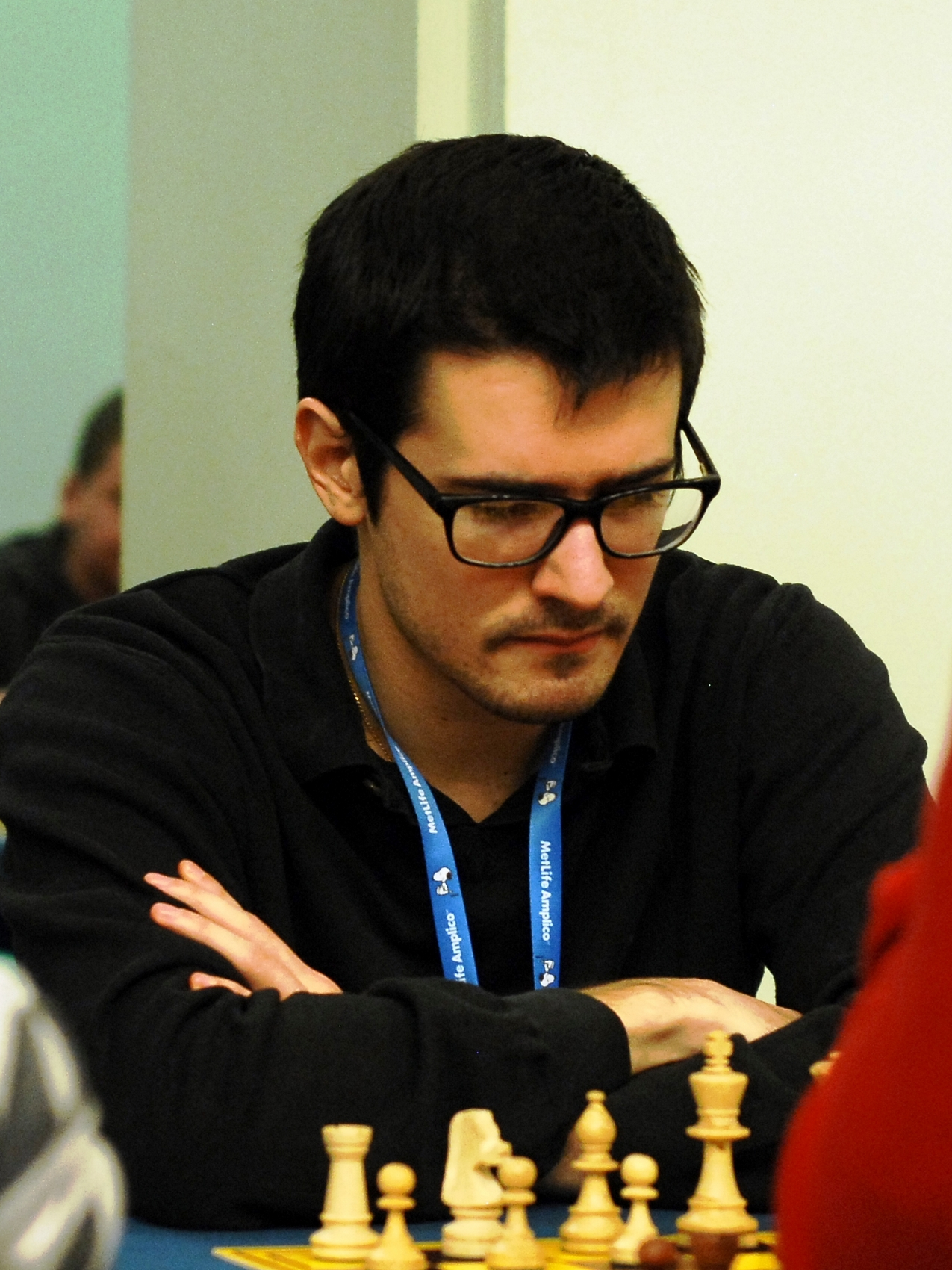
- Fargère in 2012

Personal information
- Born: September 1, 1985 (age 40) Saint-Rémy, Saône-et-Loire, France

Chess career
- Country: France
- Title: Grandmaster (2009)
- FIDE rating: 2404 (July 2026)
- Peak rating: 2520 (March 2011)

François Fargère is a French chess grandmaster.

== Chess career ==
In August 2009, he obtained his final GM norm at the XI Open International de Sants tournament held in Barcelona. He finished the tournament in third place.

In August 2010, he won the Netherlands Open ahead of Sipke Ernst and Erwin l'Ami.

In November 2011, he won the Gueugnon Rapid Tournament for the second consecutive year after drawing against Pablo Ollier in the final round. He finished the tournament undefeated.
