= Miloš Pavlović =

Miloš Pavlović may refer to:

- Miloš Pavlović (racing driver) (born 1982), Serbian race car driver
- Miloš Pavlović (footballer) (born 1983), Serbian football international player
- Miloš Pavlović (chess player) in Serbia and Montenegro Chess Championship
- Miloš Pavlović (basketball), coach
