= Aleksandar Inđić =

Serbian chess grandmaster (born 1995)

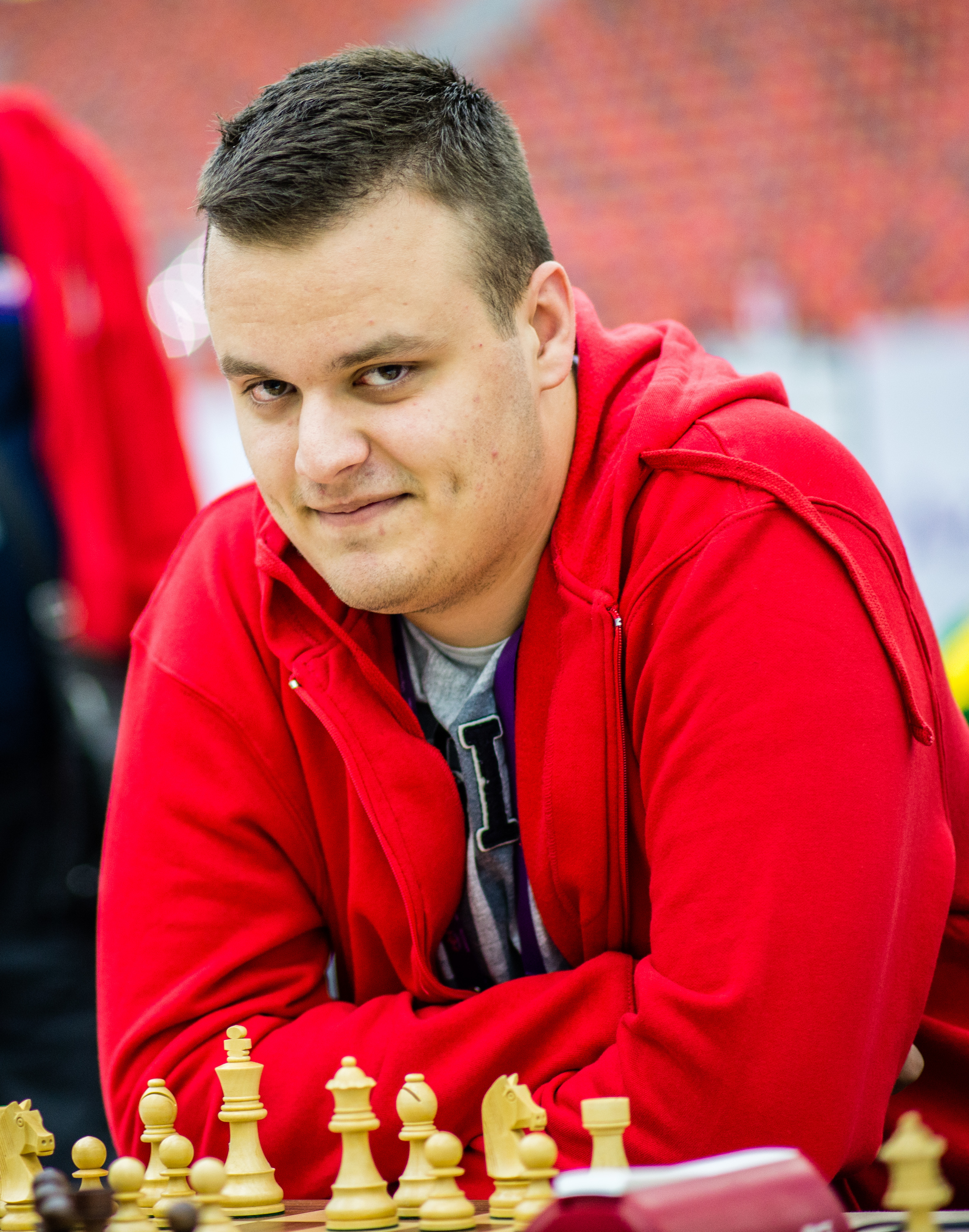
- Inđić in 2016

Personal information
- Born: 24 August 1995 (age 31) Belgrade, Serbia, FR Yugoslavia

Chess career
- Country: Serbia
- Title: Grandmaster (2013)
- FIDE rating: 2606 (October 2026)
- Peak rating: 2661 (June 2025)
- Peak ranking: No. 61 (July 2025)

Aleksandar Inđić (Serbian Cyrillic: Александар Инђић; born 24 August 1995) is a Serbian chess grandmaster. He is a four-time Serbian Chess Champion and the 2024 European Chess Champion.

== Chess career ==
Born in 1995, Inđić earned his international master title in 2012 and his grandmaster title in 2013. He won the Serbian Chess Championship in 2014, 2018, 2020 and 2023.

In February 2018, he won the Portugal Open, scoring 7½/9. Anton Demchenko also scored 7½/9, but Inđić had the best tiebreak score. Also in February, he participated in the Aeroflot Open. He finished 38th out of 92, scoring 5/9 (+3–2=4). In March 2018, he competed in the European Individual Chess Championship. He placed 133rd, scoring 5½/11 (+4–4=3). He is the No. 1 ranked Serbian player as of January 2019.

In November 2024, he won the European Individual Chess Championship, with an undefeated score of 9/11(+7-0=4).
