= Firuza Velikhanli =

Azerbaijani chess player (born 1970)

Personal information
- Born: 26 October 1970 (age 55)

Chess career
- Country: Soviet Union; Azerbaijan
- Title: Woman Grandmaster (1994)
- Peak rating: 2355 (July 1995)
- Peak ranking: No. 34 woman (July 1995)

Firuza Velikhanli (Azerbaijani: Firuzə Orxan qızı Vəlixanlı; born 26 October 1970) is an Azerbaijani chess player who holds the FIDE title of Woman Grandmaster (WGM, 1994). European Women's Team Chess Championship team bronze medal winner (1992).

== Biography ==
From the mid-1980s to the early 2000s, Velikhanli was one of the leading female chess players in Azerbaijan. In 1986, in Minsk she with Azerbaijan SSR women's team won 1st Soviet Women's Team Chess Championship. At second board, she showed outstanding result, winning all 8 of her games.

Velikhanli participated twice in USSR Women's Chess Championship finals:

- in 1987 in Tbilisi she ranked at last, 20th place;
- in 1989 in Volzhsky she shared 8th-10th place with Marina Sheremetieva and Zoya Lelchuk.

She played for Azerbaijan in the Women's Chess Olympiads:

- In 1992, at second board in the 30th Chess Olympiad (women) in Manila (+7, =3, -4),
- In 1994, at second board in the 31st Chess Olympiad (women) in Moscow (+6, =4, -3),
- In 2002, at first board in the 35th Chess Olympiad (women) in Bled (+6, =3, -5),
- In 2004, at second board in the 36th Chess Olympiad (women) in Calvià (+5, =5, -4).

Velikhanli played for Azerbaijan in the European Women's Team Chess Championships:

- In 1992, at first board in the 1st European Team Chess Championship (women) in Debrecen (+3, =3, -2) and won team and individual bronze medals,
- In 1997, at second board in the 2nd European Team Chess Championship (women) in Pula (+4, =5, -0).

She played for Azerbaijan in the World Youth U26 Team Chess Championship:

- In 1993, at first reserve board in the 9th World Youth U26 Team Chess Championship in Paranaguá (+2, =1, -1).

In 1990, Velikhanli was awarded the FIDE Woman International Master (WIM) title and in 1994 she received the title of FIDE Woman Grandmaster (WGM).

In 1991, she was awarded an Honorary Diploma of the Azerbaijan SSR for her chess performance. In 1995, she was awarded Taraggi Medal by the President of the Republic of Azerbaijan for her services in the development of sports in Azerbaijan.
