= Dejan Antić =

Serbian chess grandmaster

Dejan Antic
Personal information
- Born: 9 December 1968 (age 57) Jagodina, SFR Yugoslavia

Chess career
- Country: Yugoslavia → Serbia
- Title: Grandmaster (1999)
- Peak rating: 2523 (July 2009)

Dejan Antić (Serbian Cyrillic: Дејан Антић; born 9 December 1968) is a Serbian chess player who holds the title of Grandmaster.

== Biography ==
In March 1988 he won the Belgrade Open. In 1989, Antic became a FIDE Master (FM). In 1991 he became an International Master (IM), and in 1999 Antic became a Grandmaster (GM).

He tied for first at the Sydney International Open in April 2007.

In 2009, Antic won the Bulgarian Open Championship in Plovdiv.

In 2015, Antic won the Serbian Chess Championship on tiebreaks and represented Serbia at the European Team Chess Championship, scoring 1/2 on the reserve board.

In 2005, FIDE awarded him the FIDE Trainer title and in 2015, he became FIDE Senior Trainer.

He is the co-author of two well-known books "The Modern French" in 2012 and "The Modern Bogo" in 2014. He has contributed articles on opening theory for "Yearbook" since 2007, and Chessbase Magazine from 2013 to 2014..
