= Zlatko Ilinčić =

Serbian chess grandmaster (born 1968)

Personal information
- Born: 10 May 1968 (age 58)

Chess career
- Country: Yugoslavia → Serbia
- Title: Grandmaster (1994)
- Peak rating: 2577 (July 1999)

Zlatko Ilinčić (Serbian Cyrillic: Златко Илинчић; born 10 May 1968) is a Serbian chess player who holds the title of Grandmaster (GM) (1994). FR Yugoslavia Chess Championship winner (2000).

== Biography ==
In 2000, Zlatko Ilinčić won FR Yugoslavia Chess Championship. He was the winner of the First Saturday grandmasters chess tournament in Budapest: in July 2012 and in June 2018, and 2nd place in 2019.

Zlatko Ilinčić played for Yugoslavia in the Chess Olympiads:

- In 1994, at second reserve board in the 31st Chess Olympiad in Moscow (+0, =0, -2),
- In 1996, at fourth board in the 32nd Chess Olympiad in Yerevan (+7, =2, -2),
- In 1998, at third board in the 33rd Chess Olympiad in Elista (+4, =3, -3),
- In 2000, at second board in the 34th Chess Olympiad in Istanbul (+3, =1, -5),
- In 2002, at first reserve board in the 35th Chess Olympiad in Bled (+4, =1, -1).

Zlatko Ilinčić played for Yugoslavia in the European Team Chess Championships:

- In 1999, at second board in the 12th European Team Chess Championship in Batumi (+2, =3, -3),
- In 2001, at second board in the 13th European Team Chess Championship in León (+3, =3, -2).

Zlatko Ilinčić played for Yugoslavia in the Men's Chess Balkaniad:

- In 1994, at third board in the 25th Chess Balkaniad in Varna (+3, =1, -1) and won team silver and individual gold medals.

In 1987, Zlatko Ilinčić was awarded the FIDE International Master (IM) title and in 1994 he received the title of FIDE International Grandmaster (GM).

He won The First Saturday IM July 2023 tournament with 7 points out 9.
