= Anđelija Stojanović =

Serbian chess player (born 1987)

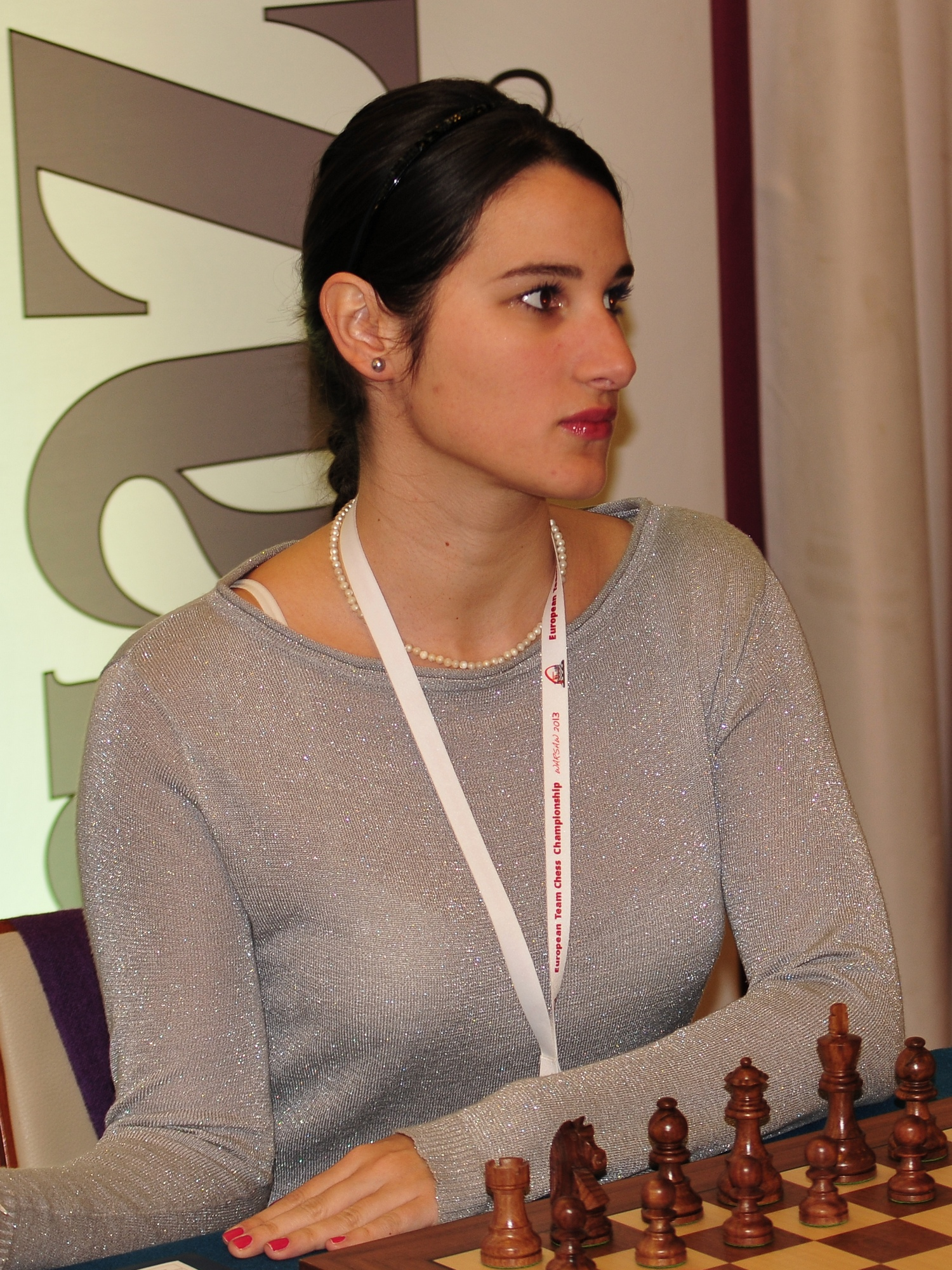
- Stojanović in 2013

Personal information
- Born: 12 November 1987 (age 38) Belgrade, SR Serbia, Yugoslavia

Chess career
- Country: Yugoslavia → Serbia
- Title: Woman Grandmaster (2007)
- Peak rating: 2372 (January 2009)
- Peak ranking: No. 92 woman (January 2009)

Anđelija Stojanović (Serbian Cyrillic: Анђелија Стојановић; born 12 November 1987) is a Serbian chess player who holds the FIDE titles of Woman Grandmaster (WGM, 2007) and FIDE Trainer (2015). She is a three-time Serbian Women's Chess Champion (2007, 2008, 2010).

== Biography ==
Anđelija Stojanović is a multiple medalist of the Serbian Women's Chess Championships, in which she won three gold (2007, 2008, 2010) and two silver (2011, 2012) medals.

Anđelija Stojanović played for Serbia in the Women's Chess Olympiads:

- In 2008, at third board in the 38th Chess Olympiad (women) in Dresden (+4, =7, -0),
- In 2010, at third board in the 39th Chess Olympiad (women) in Khanty-Mansiysk (+6, =3, -2),
- In 2012, at third board in the 40th Chess Olympiad (women) in Istanbul (+4, =4, -2),
- In 2014, at third board in the 41st Chess Olympiad (women) in Tromsø (+3, =3, -4).

Anđelija Stojanović played for Serbia in the European Women's Team Chess Championships:

- In 2007, at fourth board in the 7th European Team Chess Championship (women) in Heraklion (+4, =2, -2),
- In 2009, at third board in the 8th European Team Chess Championship (women) in Novi Sad (+3, =2, -2),
- In 2011, at third board in the 9th European Team Chess Championship (women) in Porto Carras (+3, =3, -1),
- In 2013, at fourth board in the 10th European Team Chess Championship (women) in Warsaw (+1, =4, -1),
- In 2015, at first board in the 11th European Team Chess Championship (women) in Reykjavík (+1, =3, -3).

Anđelija Stojanović played for Yugoslavia in the European Girls' U18 Team Chess Championships:

- In 2000, at second board in the 1st European U18 Team Chess Championship (girls) in Balatonlelle (+0, =1, -2),
- In 2003, at second board in the 4th European U18 Team Chess Championship (girls) in Balatonlelle (+1, =2, -1) and won team silver medal,
- In 2004, at second board in the 5th European U18 Team Chess Championship (girls) in Belgrade (+3, =0, -1) and won team gold and individual bronze medals.

In 2006, Anđelija Stojanović was awarded the FIDE Woman International Master (WIM) title and in 2007 she received the title of FIDE Woman Grandmaster (WGM). In 2015, she became a FIDE Trainer.
