= Boban Bogosavljević =

Serbian chess grandmaster (born 1988)

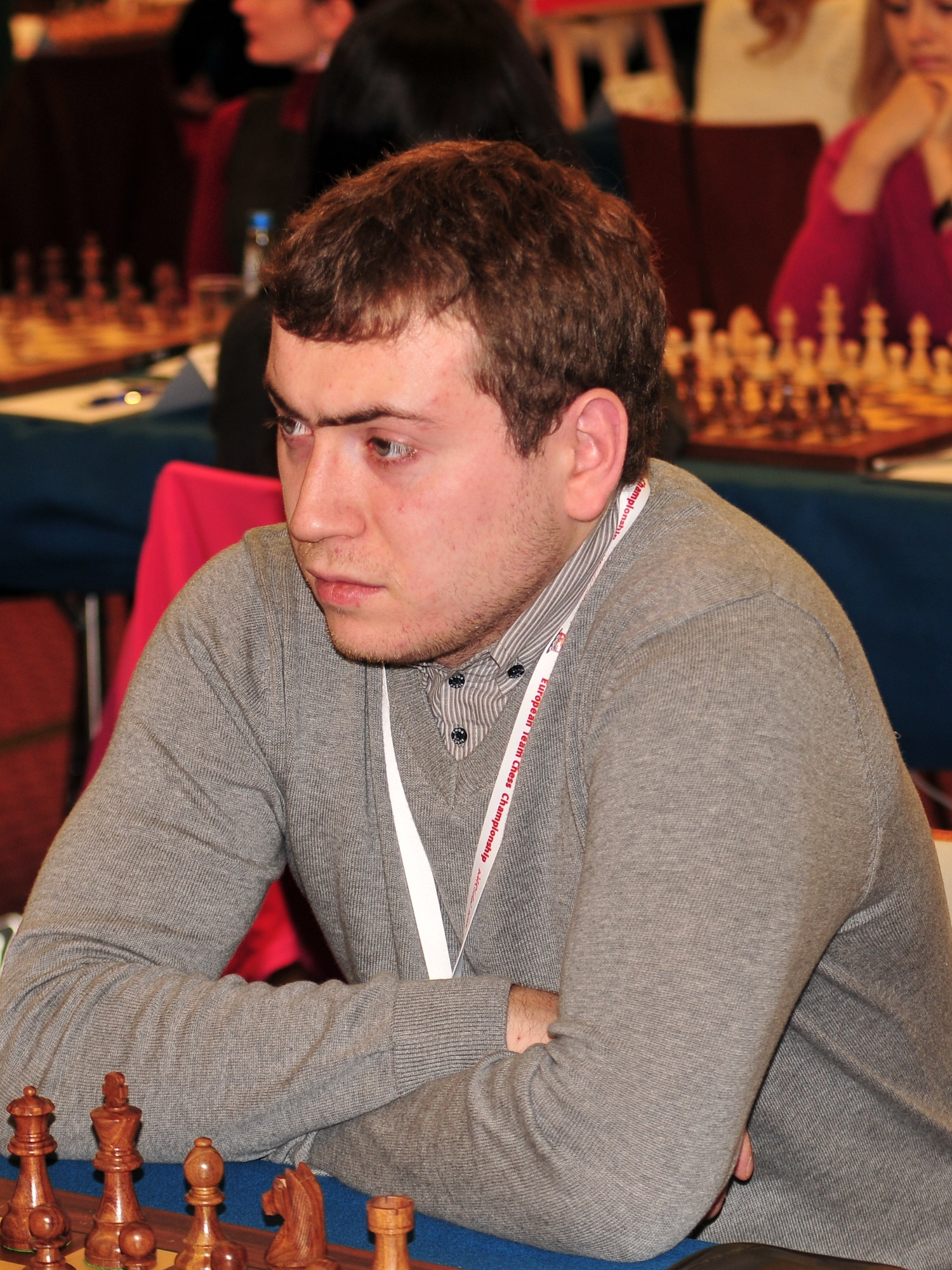
- GM Boban Bogosavljević, European Chess Team Championship Warsaw 2013

Personal information
- Born: 26 April 1988 (age 38) Vršac, Serbia

Chess career
- Country: Serbia
- Title: Grandmaster (2008)
- FIDE rating: 2469 (July 2026)
- Peak rating: 2614 (June 2022)

Boban Bogosavljevic (born 26 April 1988) is a Serbian chess grandmaster. He obtained FIDE Master title in 2005. In 2008, FIDE awarded him with Chess Grandmaster title. He won the Serbian Chess Championship in 2013.

== Notable tournaments ==
| Tournament Name | Year | ELO | Points |
|---|---|---|---|
| GM ASK 6 2022(Arandjelovac SRB) | 2022 | 2523 | 6.0 |
| 15th ch-SRB 2021(Stara Planina SRB) | 2021 | 2513 | 6.0 |
| 7th Gligoric Cup 2021(Backa Palanka SRB) | 2021 | 2530 | 4.0 |
| TCh-SRB Premier 2020(Ruma SRB) | 2020 | 2493 | 10.5 |
| 3rd Manojlovica Mem 2017(Valjevo SRB) | 2017 | 2509 | 6.5 |
| PEP 2017(Belgrade SRB) | 2017 | 2525 | 7.5 |
| TCh-SRB Premier 2015(Kragujevac SRB) | 2015 | 2520 | 7.5 |
| ch-SRB 2013(Vrnjacka Banja SRB) | 2013 | 2512 | 10.0 |
| SRB-ch U20 (Zlatibor) | 2007 | 2491 | 9.0 |
| SCG Festival U18 14th(Vrnjacka Banja) | 2006 | 2321 | 7.5 |
| YUG-ch U20 (Subotica) | 2004 | 2227 | 10.0 |
| SCG-ch U16(Niska Banja) | 2004 | 2224 | 6.5 |
