= Miloš Perunović =

Serbian chess grandmaster (born 1984)

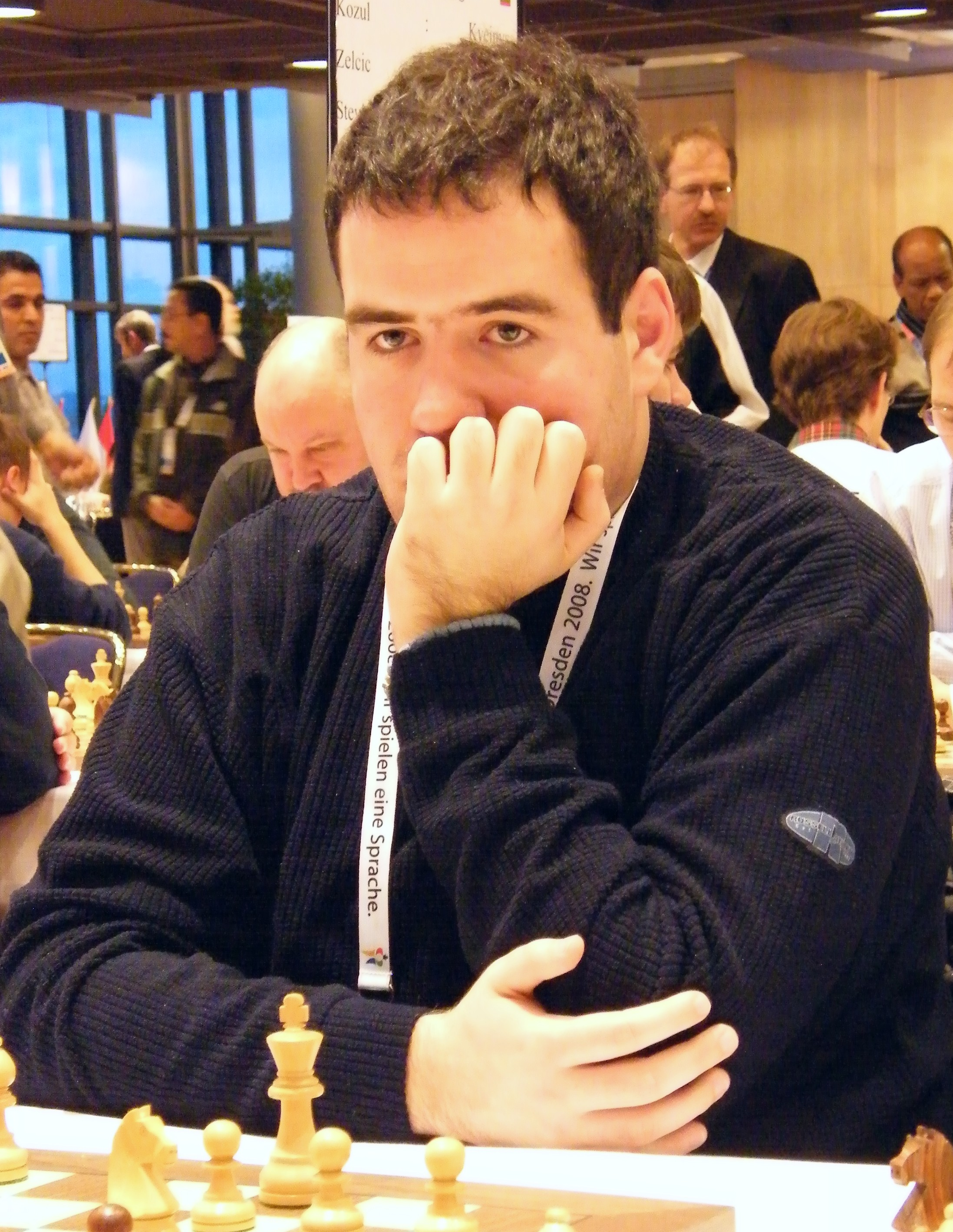
- Perunović at the Dresden Olympiad

Personal information
- Born: 14 January 1984 (age 42) Belgrade, SR Serbia, SFR Yugoslavia

Chess career
- Country: Yugoslavia → Serbia
- Title: Grandmaster (2004)
- FIDE rating: 2500 (July 2026)
- Peak rating: 2641 (April 2016)

Miloš Perunović (born 14 January 1984) is a Serbian chess player. He was awarded the title of Grandmaster (GM) by FIDE in 2004. He is a two-time national champion (2005, 2007).

== Chess career ==
Perunović played first board on the bronze medal-winning FR Yugoslavia (Serbia & Montenegro) team at the 2001 European U18 Team Chess Championship. He won the Serbia and Montenegro Chess Championship in 2005 and its successor, the Serbian Chess Championship in 2007. One of the most consistent performers at the national championship, he also has three silver and three bronze medals.

A regular national team member, Perunović has represented his country in four Chess Olympiads (2004, 2008, 2012, 2014) and seven times in the European Team Chess Championship (2003, 2005, 2009, 2011, 2013, 2015, 2017).

In 2012, he won a bronze medal with the City of Novi Sad team in the 1st FIDE World Cities Chess Championship.

Perunović tied for 10th - 23rd at the 2014 European Individual Chess Championship, which qualified him for the Chess World Cup 2015, where he was defeated in the first round by Wang Hao.

In 2016, Perunović tied for first in the Grenke Chess Open in Karlsruhe, Germany with Matthias Blübaum, Vladimir Fedoseev, Nikita Vitiugov, Ni Hua, and Francisco Vallejo Pons, taking third place on tiebreak.

He finished second in the 2018 Chigorin Memorial Blitz.

== Books ==
- The Modernized Benko Gambit. Thinkers Publishing (2018). ISBN 978-9-49251-021-1.
