= Meihriban Shukurova =

Azerbaijani chess player

Personal information
- Born: 8 June 1984 (age 42)

Chess career
- Country: Azerbaijan
- Title: Woman International Master (2000)
- Peak rating: 2281 (April 2004)

Meihriban Shukurova (Azerbaijani: Mehriban Şükürova; born 8 June 1984) is an Azerbaijani chess player. She received the FIDE title of Woman International Master (WIM) in 2000.

== Biography ==
From the end 1990s to the early 2000s, Meihriban Shukurova was one of the leading female chess players in Azerbaijan.

Shukurova played for Azerbaijan in the Women's Chess Olympiads:

- In 1998, at third board in the 33rd Chess Olympiad (women) in Elista (+8, =4, -1),
- In 2000, at third board in the 34th Chess Olympiad (women) in Istanbul (+5, =3, -4),
- In 2002, at second board in the 35th Chess Olympiad (women) in Bled (+5, =4, -4),
- In 2004, at third board in the 36th Chess Olympiad (women) in Calvià (+7, =4, -3).

She played for Azerbaijan in the European Women's Team Chess Championshipss:

- In 1999, at second board in the 3rd European Team Chess Championship (women) in Batumi (+5, =2, -2) and won team bronze medal and two individual gold medals,
- In 2001, at second board in the 4th European Team Chess Championship (women) in León (+3, =4, -2).

Since 2008 she rarely participated in chess tournaments.
