= Maria Manakova =

Serbian chess player

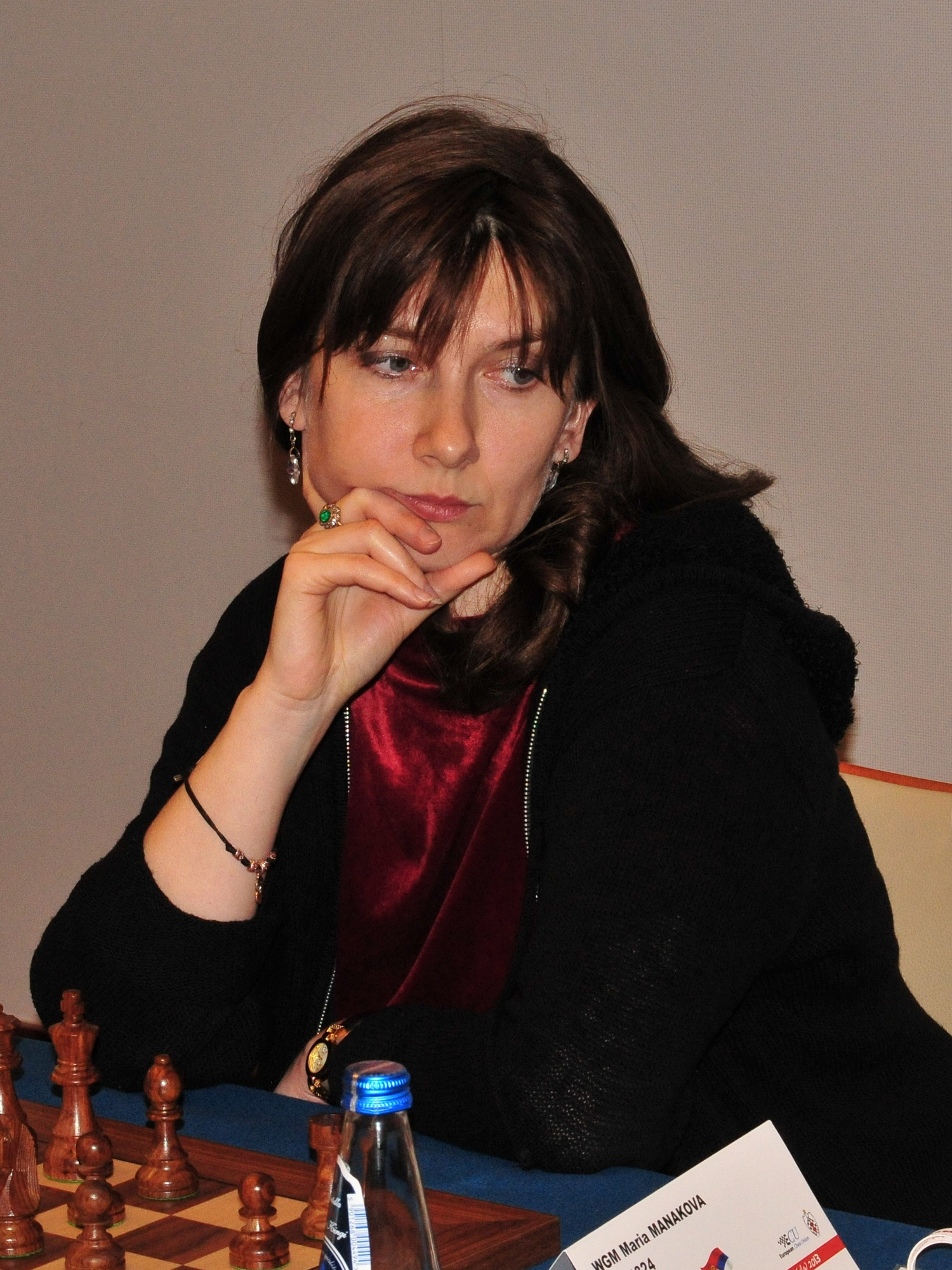
- Manakova in Warsaw, 2013

Personal information
- Born: 1 March 1974 (age 52) Kazan, Russia

Chess career
- Country: Serbia
- Title: Woman Grandmaster (1997)
- Peak rating: 2395 (April 2001)

Maria Manakova (Russian: Мария Манакова, Serbian Cyrillic: Марија Манакова; born 1 March 1974) is a Russian-born Serbian chess player holding the title of Woman Grandmaster (WGM). Born in Kazan, she lived in Serbia for several years and played for the Yugoslav women's chess team. Manakova was first board reserve on the silver medal-winning Yugoslav team at the Women's European Team Chess Championship in Batumi 1999, although she did not play any games. The following year, she competed in the Women's World Championship, where she reached round 2. In 2013, she won the Serbian women's championship.

Her peak Elo rating is 2395, achieved in the FIDE rating list of April 2001.

She appeared partly wrapped in a fur coat on the cover of the Russian magazine Speed in 2004, which along with her “forthright views", caused a stir in some circles, according to London's The Telegraph.
