= Dragiša Blagojević =

Montenegrin chess grandmaster (born 1966)

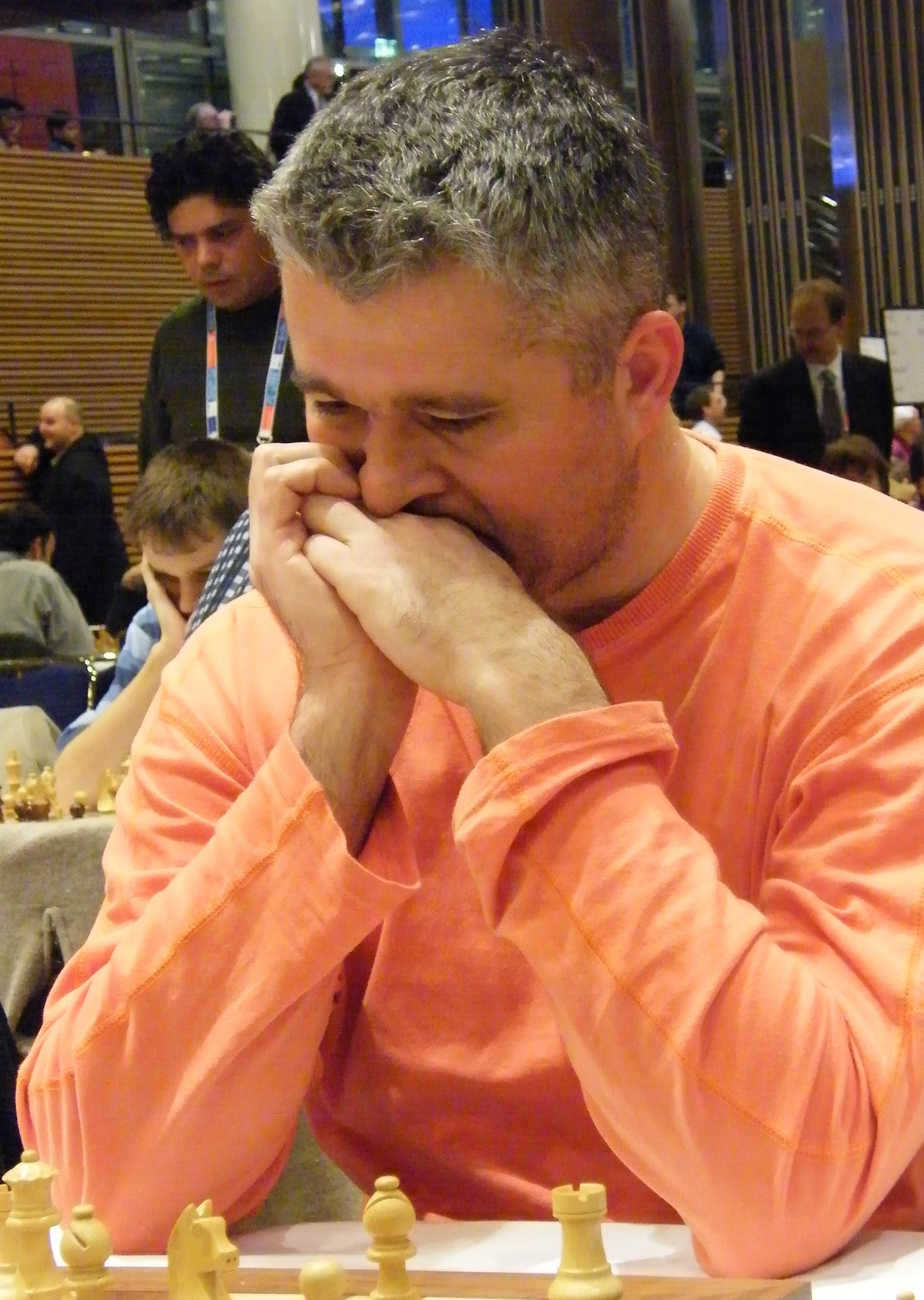
- Dragiša Blagojević in 2008

Personal information
- Born: 1 January 1966 (age 60) Tuzla, SR Montenegro, Yugoslavia

Chess career
- Country: Yugoslavia → Montenegro
- Title: Grandmaster (2004)
- FIDE rating: 2403 (October 2026)
- Peak rating: 2557 (November 2009)

Dragiša Blagojević (Montenegrin Cyrillic: Драгиша Благојевић; born 1 January 1966) is a Montenegrin chess player who holds the title of Grandmaster (GM) (2004), six-times Montenegrin Chess Championship winner (2000, 2002, 2003, 2005, 2007, 2009), Chess Olympiad individual gold medal winner (2008).

== Biography ==
Dragiša Blagojević made his first success in international chess tournaments in the late 1980s and early 1990s. In 1988, he placed 2nd in the International Chess Tournament in Prague. Dragiša Blagojević won the International Chess Tournament in Tuzla in 1990, but in 1991 he was awarded the 4th place in the Yugoslav Chess Championship. In 1996, in Podgorica Dragiša Blagojević won 2nd place in the Montenegrin Chess Championship, but in recent years has won six times this tournament: in 2000, 2002, 2003, 2005, 2007, 2009. In 2002, he was 2nd in Yugoslav Chess Championship. In 2004, in Zenica Dragiša Blagojević placed 2nd in the International Chess Tournament. In 2005, in Bijelo Polje he placed 2nd in the International Chess Tournament.

Dragiša Blagojević played for Montenegro in the Chess Olympiads:

- In 2008, at fourth board in the 38th Chess Olympiad in Dresden (+7, =2, -0) and won individual gold medal,
- In 2010, at fourth board in the 39th Chess Olympiad in Khanty-Mansiysk (+3, =4, -2),
- In 2012, at second board in the 40th Chess Olympiad in Istanbul (+3, =4, -2),
- In 2014, at second board in the 41st Chess Olympiad in Tromsø (+2, =2, -3),
- In 2016, at third board in the 42nd Chess Olympiad in Baku (+2, =5, -2),
- In 2018, at second board in the 43rd Chess Olympiad in Batumi (+4, =4, -1).

Dragiša Blagojević played for Montenegro in the European Team Chess Championships:

- In 2007, at fourth board in the 16th European Team Chess Championship in Heraklion (+1, =7, -0),
- In 2009, at first board in the 17th European Team Chess Championship in Novi Sad (+2, =4, -1),
- In 2011, at second board in the 18th European Team Chess Championship in Porto Carras (+1, =6, -1),
- In 2013, at second board in the 19th European Team Chess Championship in Warsaw (+1, =3, -3),
- In 2015, at second board in the 20th European Team Chess Championship in Reykjavík (+0, =6, -1),
- In 2017, at second board in the 21st European Team Chess Championship in Hersonissos (+1, =5, -1).

In 1988, Dragiša Blagojević was awarded the FIDE International Master (IM) title and in 2004 he received the title of FIDE Grandmaster (GM).

== Private ==
His daughter Tijana Mandura (born in 1997), is a chess master.
