= Jean-Philippe Gentilleau =

Monegasque chess player

Personal information
- Born: 12 September 1965 (age 60)

Chess career
- Country: Monaco
- Title: FIDE Master (2010)
- Peak rating: 2267 (January 2004)

Jean-Philippe Gentilleau (born 12 September 1965) is a Monegasque chess FIDE Master (FM) (2010) and Chess Olympiad individual gold medal winner (2002).

== Biography ==
In 2004, Jean-Philippe Gentilleau won the Monegasque Chess Championship. In 2015, he participated in the Macedonian Open Chess Championship, where he ranked 9th among 50 players.

Jean-Philippe Gentilleau played for Monaco in the Chess Olympiads:

- in 1996, at the second board in the 32nd Chess Olympiad in Yerevan (+6, =4, -3),
- in 2000, at the second board in the 34th Chess Olympiad in Istanbul (+2, =4, -4),
- in 2002, at the second board in the 35th Chess Olympiad in Bled (+6, =2, -1), winning an individual gold medal,
- in 2004, at the third board in the 36th Chess Olympiad in Calvià (+4, =8, -1),
- in 2006, at the third board in the 37th Chess Olympiad in Turin (+2, =5, -2),
- in 2008, at the fourth board in the 38th Chess Olympiad in Dresden (+0, =1, -6),
- in 2010, at the fourth board in the 39th Chess Olympiad in Khanty-Mansiysk (+5, =2, -2),
- in 2012, at the third board in the 40th Chess Olympiad in Istanbul (+2, =3, -3).

Jean-Philippe Gentilleau played for Monaco in the Small Nations Chess Team Tournament:

- in 2009, at second board in the 1st Small Nations Chess Team Tournament in Andorra la Vella (+2, =4, -1).
