= Sandra Đukić =

Serbian chess player (born 1988)

Personal information
- Born: 3 June 1988 (age 38) Niš, SR Serbia, Yugoslavia

Chess career
- Country: Yugoslavia → Serbia
- Title: Woman International Master (2011)
- Peak rating: 2233 (July 2009)

Sandra Đukić (Serbian Cyrillic: Сандра Ђукић; also transliterated Djukić; born 3 June 1988) is a Serbian chess player who holds the title of Woman International Master (WIM, 2011). She won the Serbian Women's Chess Championship in 2009.

== Biography ==
Đukić won the national championship for cadet girls under 10 years old in 1998. She went on to win the next seven championships in her age group (U10, U12, U14, U16, U18), breaking all girls cadet records under 18 years old.

At the 1999 World Cadet Blitz Chess Championship in Valencia, she finished in second place. In 2002, she won the European Championship in rapid chess (25 minutes).

In 2005, she won the U20 girls national youth championship.

She represented Serbia at the 2013 Summer Universiade in Women's Individual Chess and finished in 34th place.

Đukić won the Serbian Women's Chess Championship in 2009, was second in 2013 and placed third in 2016. She also won Republika Srpska Women's Chess Championship in 2014.

She was a member of Jelica PEP Goračići chess club which finished second in Serbian First League in 2010 and third in 2012.

In 2011, Đukić was awarded the FIDE Woman International Master (WIM) title. She has 2 WGM norms (2009).
