= Nikola Djukić =

Montenegrin chess grandmaster (born 1983)

- Djukić in 2026

Personal information
- Born: January 26, 1983 (age 43) Podgorica, SFR Yugoslavia

Chess career
- Country: Montenegro
- Title: Grandmaster (2005)
- FIDE rating: 2463 (November 2026)
- Peak rating: 2574 (November 2018)

Nikola Djukić is a Montenegrin chess grandmaster.

== Chess career ==
He is a nine-time Montenegrin Chess Champion, having won the championship in 2004, 2011, 2012, 2013, 2014, 2015, 2017, 2018, and 2019.

In December 2021, he tied for first place with Igor Miladinović in the 1st Radojica Dabetić Memorial. He won the championship after tiebreak scores.

In December 2023, he won the 3rd Radojica Dabetić Memorial one point ahead of runner-up Danilo Milanović. He won his first seven games and drew the final two games.

In December 2024, he won the 4th Radojica Dabetić Memorial alongside Blažo Kalezić.
