= Aleksa Striković =

Serbian chess grandmaster (born 1961)

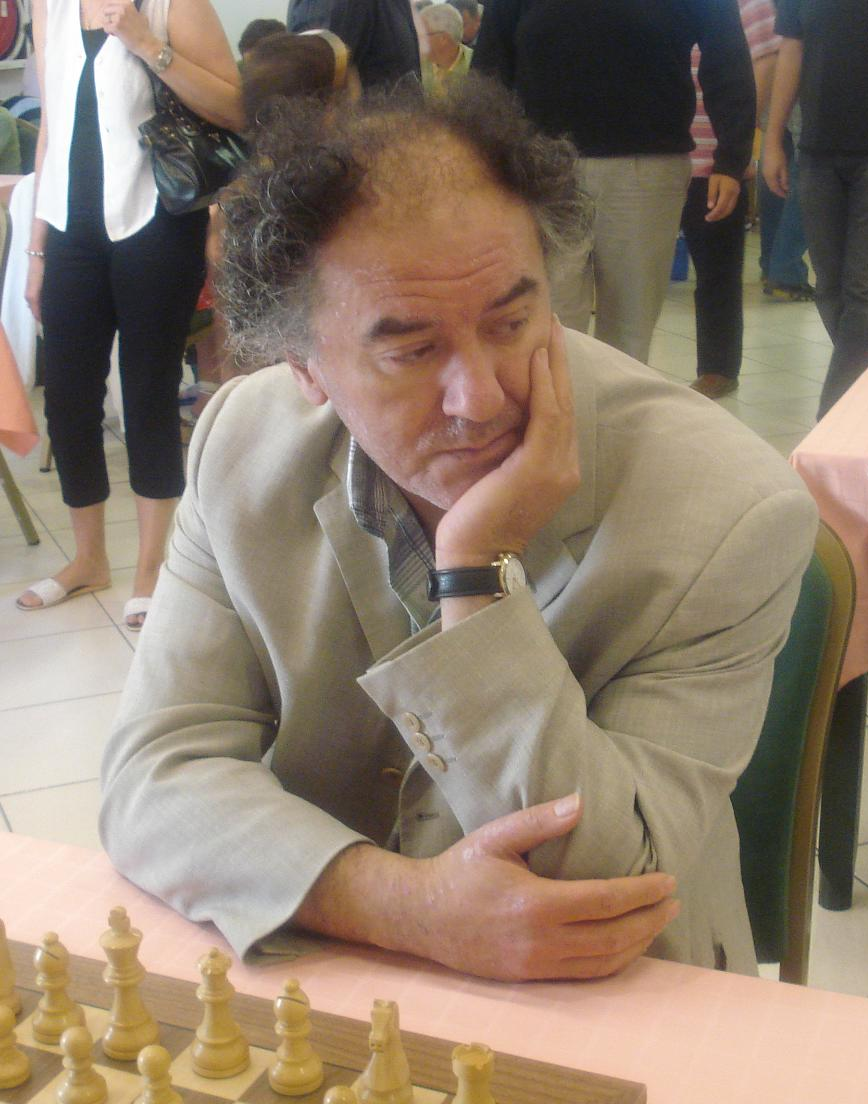

Personal information
- Born: May 12, 1961 (age 65)

Chess career
- Country: Yugoslavia → Serbia
- Title: Grandmaster (1996)
- Peak rating: 2573 (July 2011)

Aleksa Striković (born 12 May 1961) is a Serbian chess grandmaster.

He won the FR Yugoslavia Chess Championship in 1992, and the South African Open in 2016.

He also competed in the 1998 Chess Olympiad for Yugoslavia, finishing on 3.5/7.
