= Lu Miaoyi =

Chinese chess player (born 2010)

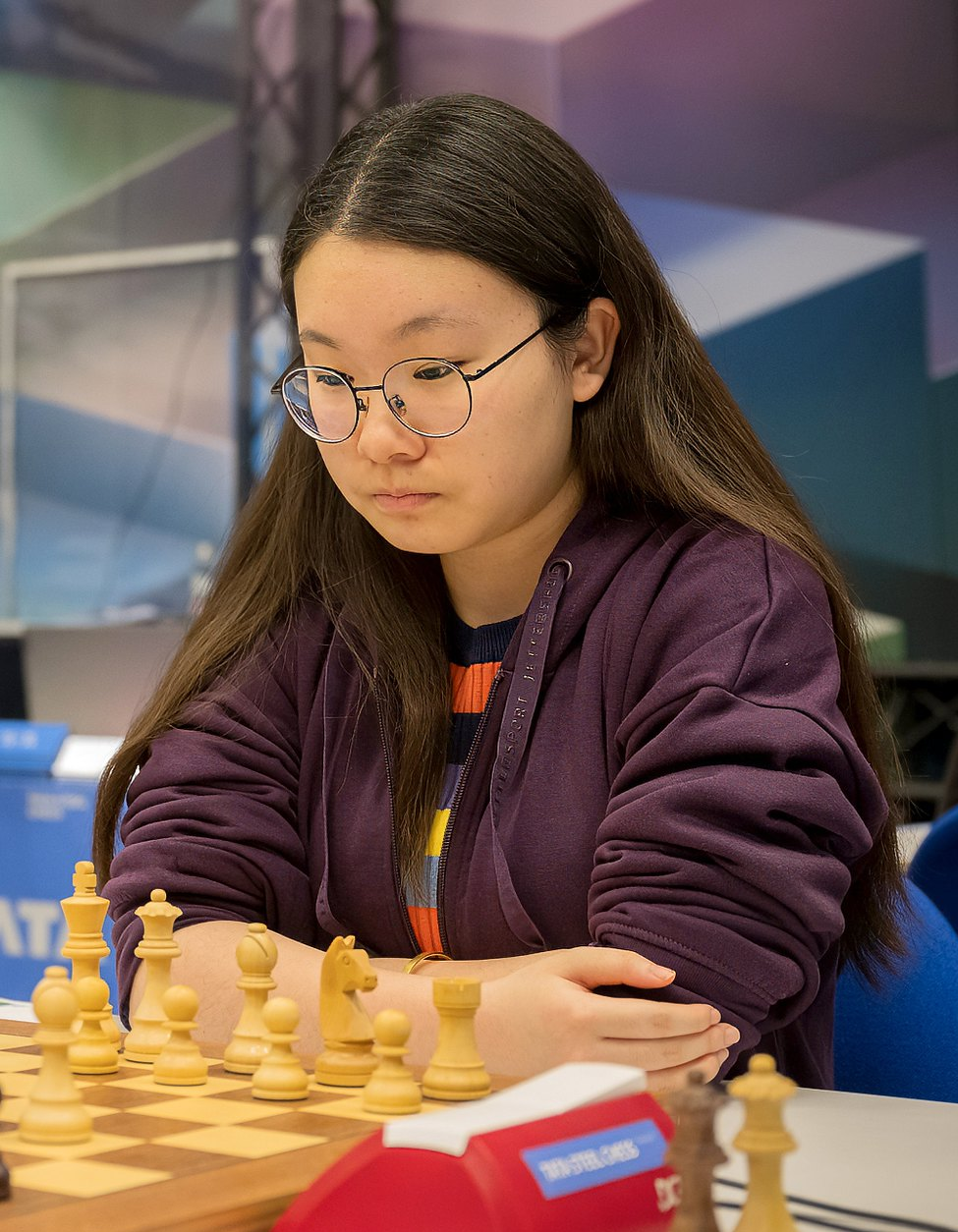
- Lu Miaoyi in 2025

Personal information
- Born: February 2010 (age 16)

Chess career
- Country: China
- Title: International Master (2024); Woman Grandmaster (2023)
- Peak rating: 2452 (June 2025)

Lu Miaoyi (Chinese: 鹿妙夷; born February 2010) is a Chinese chess player who holds the title of International Master (IM). She has a peak FIDE rating of 2452, and is the No. 1 junior girl in the world. Lu is the reigning Chinese women's national champion. She is the fourth-youngest girl in chess history to become an International Master.

== Background ==
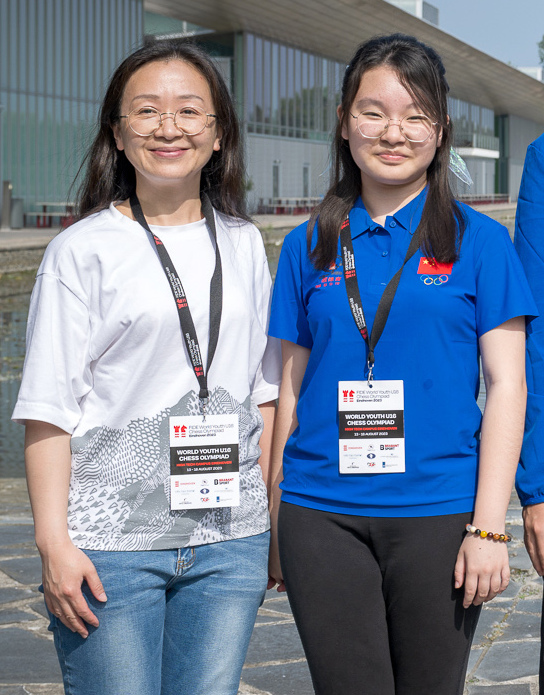
Lu Miaoyi with her mother in 2023

Lu was born in a chess family in which her mother Xu Yuanyuan is a chess player who holds the title of Woman Grandmaster (WGM) and her grandfather Xu Tao is an amateur chess player who won the Beijing Junior Chess Championship as a child. Lu was first introduced to chess at age three at her mother's chess club, and played her first FIDE-rated tournament at age five. Her mother began formally teaching her how to play at age seven.

== Chess career ==
Lu drew media attention when she reached a rating of 2200 shortly after turning 10 years old by finishing in ninth place in the Liberec Open in the Czech Republic and winning the 52nd Belgrade International Women's Grandmaster Chess Tournament with a performance rating near 2400. Lu earned her first Woman Grandmaster (WGM) norm in the Serbian Women's League in November 2022 by defeating Lilit Mkrtchian, an International Master (IM), in an 18-move miniature. She scored her remaining WGM norms in 2023, and was awarded the title of Woman Grandmaster towards the end of the year.

Lu had reached a live rating of 2400 in early 2023, but did not have any IM norms until 2024. She earned all three IM norms in a span of under two months, the first two back-to-back in January at the Vandœuvre Open and the Sevilla Open, and the last in February at the Kragerø Resort International to clinch the IM title. She continued to have success thereafter, earning an extra fourth IM norm at the Reykjavik Open where she had a chance at a GM norm in the final round. With this result, she entered the women's top 50 and reached a published rating of 2400, both for the first time. In May, Lu entered the Chinese Women's Championship as the top seed and won the title in a blitz playoff against Ni Shiqun. Her mother had also previously won the title in 2003. With the title, she also qualified for China's 2024 Women's Olympiad team.
