= Ivan Ivanišević =

Serbian chess grandmaster (born 1977)

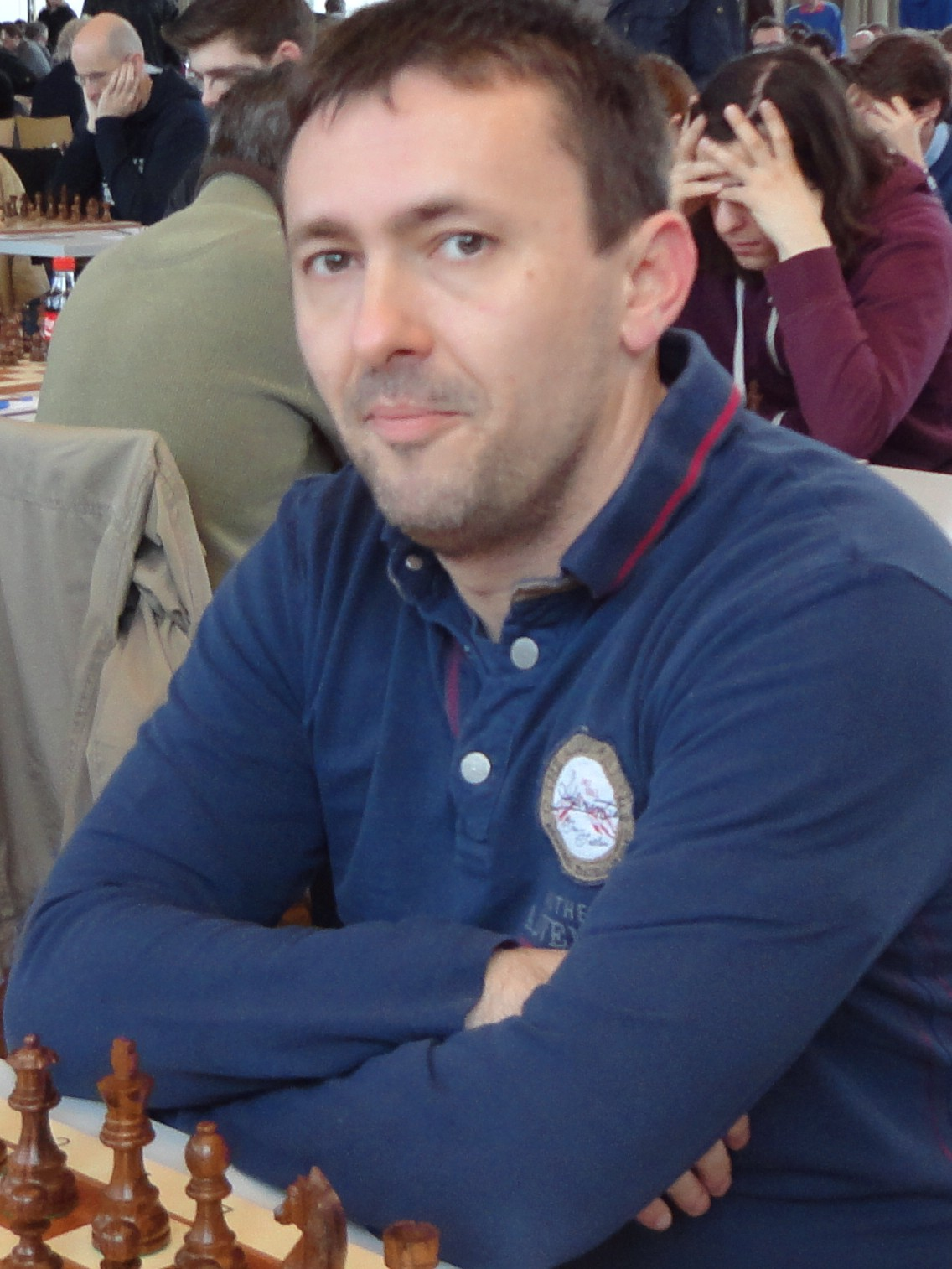
- Ivan Ivanišević, Karlsruhe 2016

Personal information
- Born: 23 November 1977 (age 48)

Chess career
- Country: Yugoslavia → Serbia
- Title: Grandmaster (2000)
- FIDE rating: 2517 (July 2026)
- Peak rating: 2665 (January 2016)
- Peak ranking: No. 57 (July 2008)

Ivan Ivanišević (Serbian Cyrillic: Иван Иванишевић; born 23 November 1977) is a Serbian chess player who received the FIDE title of Grandmaster in 2000. He won the Serbian Chess Championship in 2008, 2009, 2011, 2012, 2017, 2019 and 2025. He participated in seven Chess Olympiads to date, representing FR Yugoslavia (1998, 2000 and 2002) and Serbia (2008, 2010, 2012 and 2014), three times on the first board.

Ivanišević participated in the Chess World Cup 2021 and reached the second round via walkover, where he was eliminated by Alexander Areshchenko. He also took part in the Chess World Cup 2011, where he was eliminated in the first round by Alexander Onischuk. That same year, he won the 3rd Balkan Individual Chess Championship in Podgorica. In 2014, Ivanišević won the Chigorin Memorial in Saint Petersburg.

== See also ==
- List of chess players
- List of chess grandmasters
