= Andreea Navrotescu =

French chess player (born 1996)

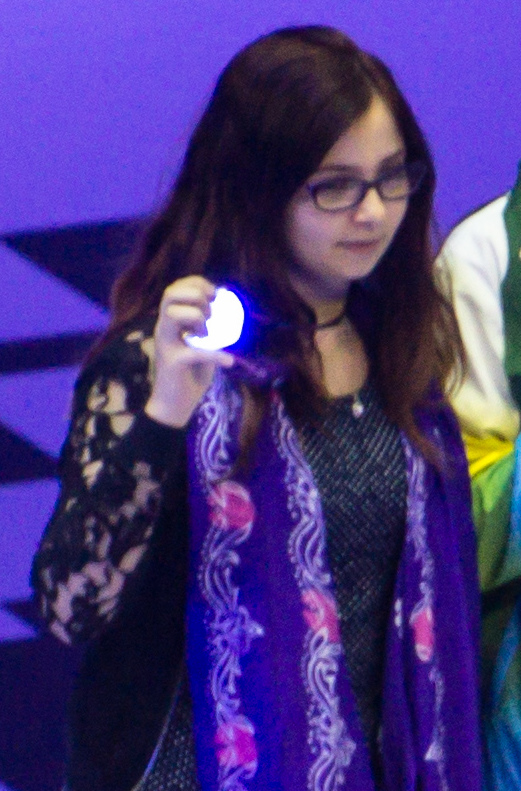

Personal information
- Born: 21 December 1996 (age 29)

Chess career
- Country: France
- Title: Woman Grandmaster (2022)
- Peak rating: 2373 (July 2022)

Andreea Navrotescu (born 21 December 1996) is a French chess player who holds the title of Woman Grandmaster. She is a Women's Chess Olympiad individual silver medalist (2016).

== Biography ==
Navrotescu won the French Youth Chess Championships six times in various girl's age groups. In 2012, in Prague she won a bronze medal in the European Youth Chess Championship girl's U16 age group.

She played for France in the Women's Chess Olympiad:

- In 2016, at reserve board in the 42nd Chess Olympiad (women) in Baku (+6, =2, -2) and won an individual silver medal.

Navrotescu played for France in the European Women's Team Chess Championship:

- In 2019, at fourth board in the 22nd European Team Chess Championship (women) in Batumi (+4, =0, -3).

In 2022, she won the 53rd Belgrade WGM tournament with a score of 7/9.

She received the Woman FIDE Master (WFM) title in 2012, FIDE Woman International Master (WIM) title in 2016, and Woman Grandmaster (WGM) title in 2022.

She livestreams on Twitch under the username andy_rekt, the same name she uses for her YouTube channel.
