= Ana Benderać =

Serbian chess player (born 1977)

Personal information
- Born: 25 January 1977 (age 49) Yugoslavia

Chess career
- Country: Yugoslavia → Serbia
- Title: Woman Grandmaster (2004)
- Peak rating: 2334 (April 2008)

Ana Benderać (Serbian Cyrillic: Ана Бендераћ; born 25 January 1977) is a Serbian chess player. She received the FIDE titles of Woman Grandmaster (WGM) in 2004 and FIDE Trainer in 2018.

== Biography ==
In 2009, in Belgrade, Ana Benderać won the women's grandmaster chess tournament. In 2013, she won bronze medal in the Serbian Women's Chess Championship. In 2019, in Chelyabinsk, Ana Benderać won other women's grandmaster chess tournament.

Ana Benderać won the European Chess Club Cup (women) twice: in 1997 in Rijeka with chess club Goša Smederevska Palanka, and in 2003 in Rethymno with chess club ŠK Internet-CG Podgorica.

Ana Benderać played for Yugoslavia, Serbia & Montenegro and Serbia in the Women's Chess Olympiads:

- In 2002, at first reserve board in the 35th Chess Olympiad (women) in Bled (+4, =2, -2),
- In 2004, at first reserve board in the 36th Chess Olympiad (women) in Calvià (+5, =5, -1),
- In 2006, at first reserve board in the 37th Chess Olympiad (women) in Turin (+7, =3, -1),
- In 2008, at reserve board in the 38th Chess Olympiad (women) in Dresden (+1, =0, -1),
- In 2012, at reserve board in the 40th Chess Olympiad (women) in Istanbul (+2, =2, -3).

Ana Benderać played for Serbia & Montenegro and Serbia in the European Women's Team Chess Championships:

- In 2005, at reserve board in the 6th European Team Chess Championship (women) in Gothenburg (+0, =2, -0),
- In 2007, at third board in the 7th European Team Chess Championship (women) in Heraklion (+3, =0, -5).

In 2001, Ana Benderać was awarded the FIDE Woman International Master (WIM) title and in 2004 the FIDE Woman Grandmaster (WGM) title. In 2018, she became a FIDE Trainer.
