= Nikita Petrov =

Russian historian (born 1957)

Nikita Vasilyevich Petrov
- Никита Васильевич Петров
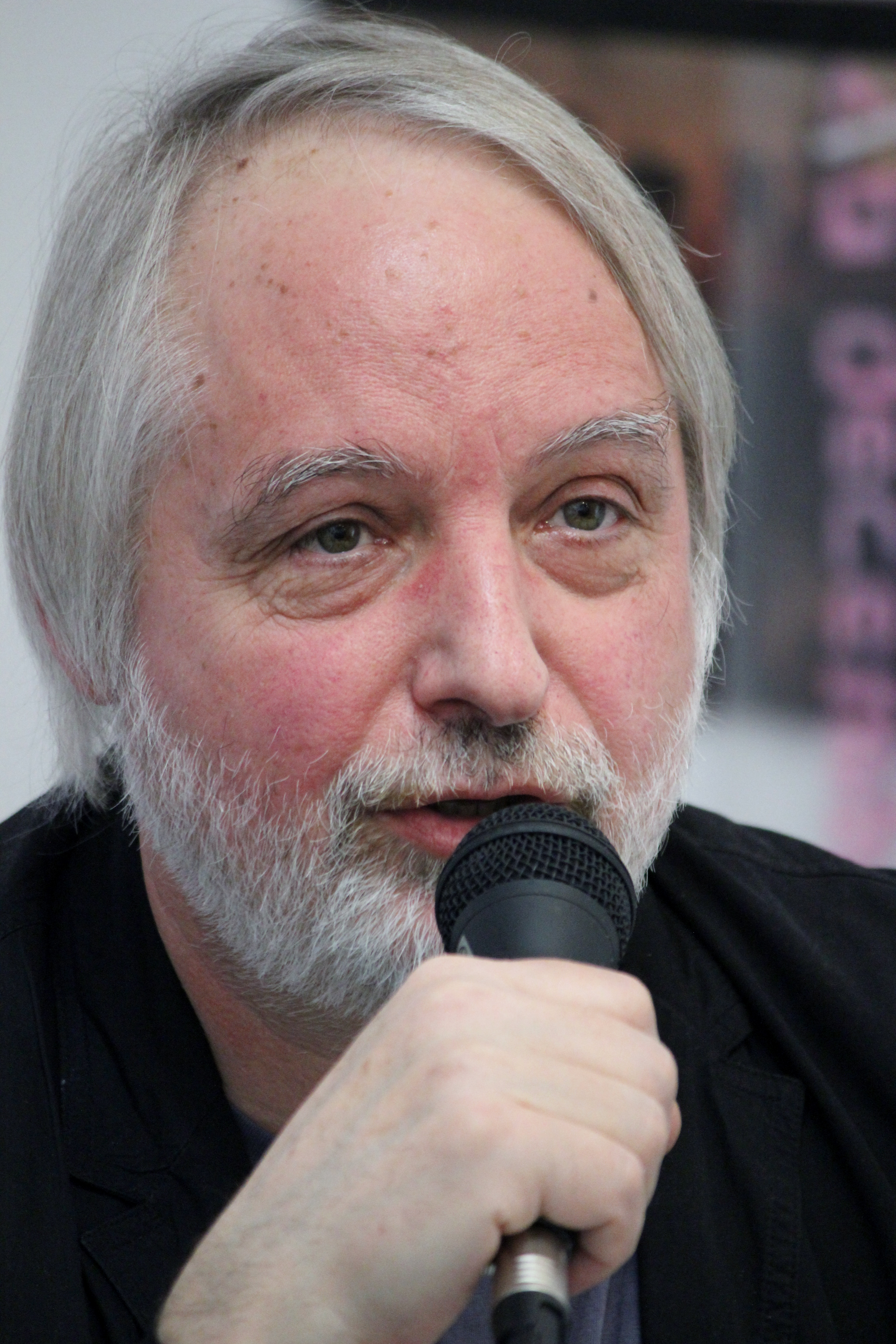
- Nikita Petrov at the 21st International Fair for Hiqh-quality Fiction and Non-fiction in Moscow, 6 December 2019
- Born: January 31, 1957 (age 69); Kiev, Ukrainian SSR
- Citizenship: Soviet Union (1957–1991) → Russia (1991–present)
- Education: D. Mendeleev University of Chemical Technology of Russia, University of Amsterdam
- Awards
- Scientific career
- Fields: history
- Workplaces: Russian State University for the Humanities; Moscow State University; Memorial society
- Website: memo.ru/d/3409.html

Nikita Vasilyevich Petrov (Russian: Ники́та Васи́льевич Петро́в, born 31 January 1957, Kiev) is a Russian historian. He works at Memorial, a Russian organization dedicated to studying Soviet political repression. Petrov specializes in Soviet security services.

The book about Nikolai Ezhov written by Nikita Petrov and Marc Jansen is based on the archives made accessible after the dissolution of the Soviet Union. Petrov's part was tracking original archival documents, while Jansen worked with published sources.

On March 24, 2005 Nikita Petrov was awarded Knight's Cross of the Order of Merit of the Republic of Poland for his efforts in uncovering truth about repressions against Polish people during the war.

In 2008 Petrov earned Ph.D. from the University of Amsterdam (Instituut voor Cultuur en Geschiedenis, Faculty of Humanities) with the thesis "Сталин и органы НКВД-МГБ в советизации стран Центральной и Восточной Европы. 1945–1953 гг."

Articles by Petrov were published in the Novaya Gazeta.

== Bibliography ==
- Петров, Никита; Рогинский, Арсений (1997). "Польская операция НКВД 1937–1938 гг." [The Polish operation of the NKVD, 1937–1938]. In Гурьянов, Александр (ed.). Репрессии против поляков и польских граждан [Repression against the Poles and Polish citizens] (in Russian). Moscow: Звенья. p. 22. ISBN 9785787000122.
- Петров Н. В.; Кокурин А. И. (1997). ВЧК-ОГПУ-НКВД-НКГБ-МГБ-МВД-КГБ. 1917–1960. Справочник [Cheka-OGPU-NKVD-NKGB-MGB-MVD-KGB. 1917–1960. Handbook] (PDF) (in Russian). Moscow. ISBN 978-5-89511-004-1. Archived (PDF) from the original on 27 December 2013.
- Петров, Никита (1998). "Роль МГБ СССР в советизации Польши (проведение выборов и выборов в Сейм в 1946–47 гг.)" [The role of the MGB in the sovietization of Poland (holding the referendum and election for the Sejm in 1946–47)]. In Гайдук, Илья; Егорова, Наталия; Чубарьян, Александр (eds.). Сталин и холодная война [Stalin and the Cold War] (in Russian). Moscow: The Institute of Global History at the Russian Academy of Sciences. pp. 102–116.
- Петров Н. В.; Скоркин К. В. (1999). Кто руководил НКВД. 1934–1941 гг. Справочник [Who Headed the NKVD. 1934–1941. Handbook] (PDF) (in Russian). Moscow: Звенья. ISBN 978-5787000320.
- Петров Н. В.; Кокурин А. И. (2000). ГУЛАГ: Главное управление лагерей. 1918–1960 [Gulag. Main camp administration. 1918–1960] (PDF, immediate download) (in Russian). Moscow. ISBN 978-5-85646-046-8. Archived from the original on 13 November 2015.
- Petrov, Nikita (2001). "Les transformations du personnel des organes de sécurité soviétiques, 1922–1953" [Transformations of staff of Soviet security organs, 1922–1953]. Cahiers du Monde Russe (in French). 22 (2): 375–396. doi:10.4000/monderusse.8460. Archived from the original on 5 April 2016.
- Petrov N.; Jansen M. (2002). Stalin's Loyal Executioner: People's Commissar Nikolai Ezhov, 1895–1940. Stanford: Hoover Institution Press. ISBN 978-0-8179-2902-2.
- Петров Н. В.; Кокурин А. И. (2003). Лубянка. Органы ВЧК-ОГПУ-НКВД-НКГБ-МГБ-МВД-КГБ. 1917–1991. Справочник [Lubyanka. Organs of Cheka-OGPU-NKVD-NKGB-MGB-MVD-KGB. 1917–1991. Handbook] (PDF) (in Russian). Moscow: Международный фонд "Демократия". ISBN 978-5-85646-109-0. Archived (PDF) from the original on 19 October 2012.
- Petrov, Nikita; Roginskii, Arsenii (2003). "The "Polish operation" of the NKVD, 1937–1938". In McLoughlin, Barry; McDermott, Kevin (eds.). Stalin's terror. High politics and mass repression in the Soviet Union. New York: Palgrave Macmillan. pp. 153–172. doi:10.1057/9780230523937_7. ISBN 978-1403901194.
- Петров Н. В. (2005). Первый председатель КГБ Иван Серов [The first chairman of the KGB: Ivan Serov] (in Russian). Moscow: Материк. ISBN 978-5-85646-129-8.
- Петров Н. В.; Янсен М. (2008). "Сталинский питомец" — Николай Ежов ["Stalin's foster-child"—Nikolay Ezhov] (in Russian). Moscow: Российская политическая энциклопедия; Фонд Первого Президента России Б.Н. Ельцина. ISBN 978-5-8243-0919-5.
- Foitzik, Jan; Petrow, Nikita (2009). Die sowjetischen Geheimdienste in der SBZ/DDR von 1945 bis 1953 [The Soviet secret services in the SBZ/GDR from 1945 to 1953] (in German). Berlin–New York: De Gruyter. ISBN 978-3110230147.
- Petrov, Nikita (2009). "Die militärische Spionageabwehr in Österreich und die Todesstrafe" [Military counterintelligence in Austria and death penalty]. In Karner, Stefan (ed.). Stalins letzte Opfer: verschleppte und erschossene Österreicher in Moskau, 1950–1953 [Stalin's last victim: abducted and shot dead Austrians in Moscow, 1950–1953] (in German). Wien: Böhlau Verlag. pp. 79–96. ISBN 978-3205782810.
- Петров Н.; Фойтцик Я. (2009). Аппарат НКВД-МГБ в Германии. 1945–1953 [The apparatus of NKVD-MGB in Germany. 1945–1953] (in Russian). Moscow: Международный фонд "Демократия". ISBN 978-5-89511-012-6.
- Петров Н. В. (2010). Кто руководил органами Госбезопасности. 1941–1954 гг. Справочник [Who headed the organs of the State Security. 1941–1954. Handbook] (PDF) (in Russian). Moscow: Звенья. Archived from the original (PDF) on 19 October 2012. ISBN 5-7870-0109-9
- Petrov N. (2010). Die sowjetischen Geheimdienstmitarbeiter in Deutschland. Der leitende Personalbestand der Staatssicherheitsorgane der UdSSR in der Sowjetischen Besatzungszone Deutschlands und der DDR von 1945–1954. Biografisches Nachschlagwerk [The Soviet secret service agents in Germany. The senior staff of the state security organs of the USSR in the Soviet occupation zone of Germany and the GDR in 1945–1954. Biographical handbook] (in German). Berlin: Metropo. ISBN 978-3940938800.
- Петров Н. В. (2011). По сценарию Сталина. Роль органов НКВД-МГБ СССР в советизации стран Центральной и Восточной Европы. 1945–1953 гг [According to Stalin's scenario. The role of organs of NKVD-MGB of the USSR in the sovietization of Central and Eastern Europe. 1945–1953] (in Russian). Moscow: Российская политическая энциклопедия. ISBN 978-5824315417.
- Петров Н. В. (2011). Палачи. Они выполняли заказы Сталина [Executioners. They implemented Stalin's orders] (in Russian). Moscow: Новая газета. ISBN 978-5911470180.
- Pietrow N. (2012). Psy Stalina (in Polish). Warszawa: Demart. ISBN 978-8374278249.
- Pietrow N. (2013). Stalinowski kat Polski. Sierow [Stalin's polish executioner. Serov] (in Polish). Warszawa: Demart. ISBN 978-8374279192.
- Petrov N. (2014). Budeliai. Jie vykde Stalino užsakymus [Executioners. They implemented Stalin's orders] (in Lithuanian). Vilnius.
- Петров, Никита (April–September 2003). "Репрессии в аппарате МГБ в последние годы жизни Сталина 1951–1953" [Repressions in the MGB apparatus during the last years of Stalin's life 1951–1953]. Cahiers du Monde Russe (in Russian). 44 (2–3): 403–436. JSTOR 20174780.

== Petrov's video lectures ==
- Лекция "Мемориала" по истории политических репрессий (Memorial lecture on the history of political repression, in Russian, 149 min) on YouTube
- Общество Мемориал: Семинар «Москва. Места памяти»: Никита Петров (Memorial society: seminar "Moscow. Places of memory": Nikita Petrov, in Russian, 68 min) on YouTube
- Сотрудники карательных органов: от ВЧК до КГБ (Agents of punitive organs: from Cheka to the NKVD, in Russian, 134 min) on YouTube
