= Sipke Ernst =

Dutch chess grandmaster (born 1979)

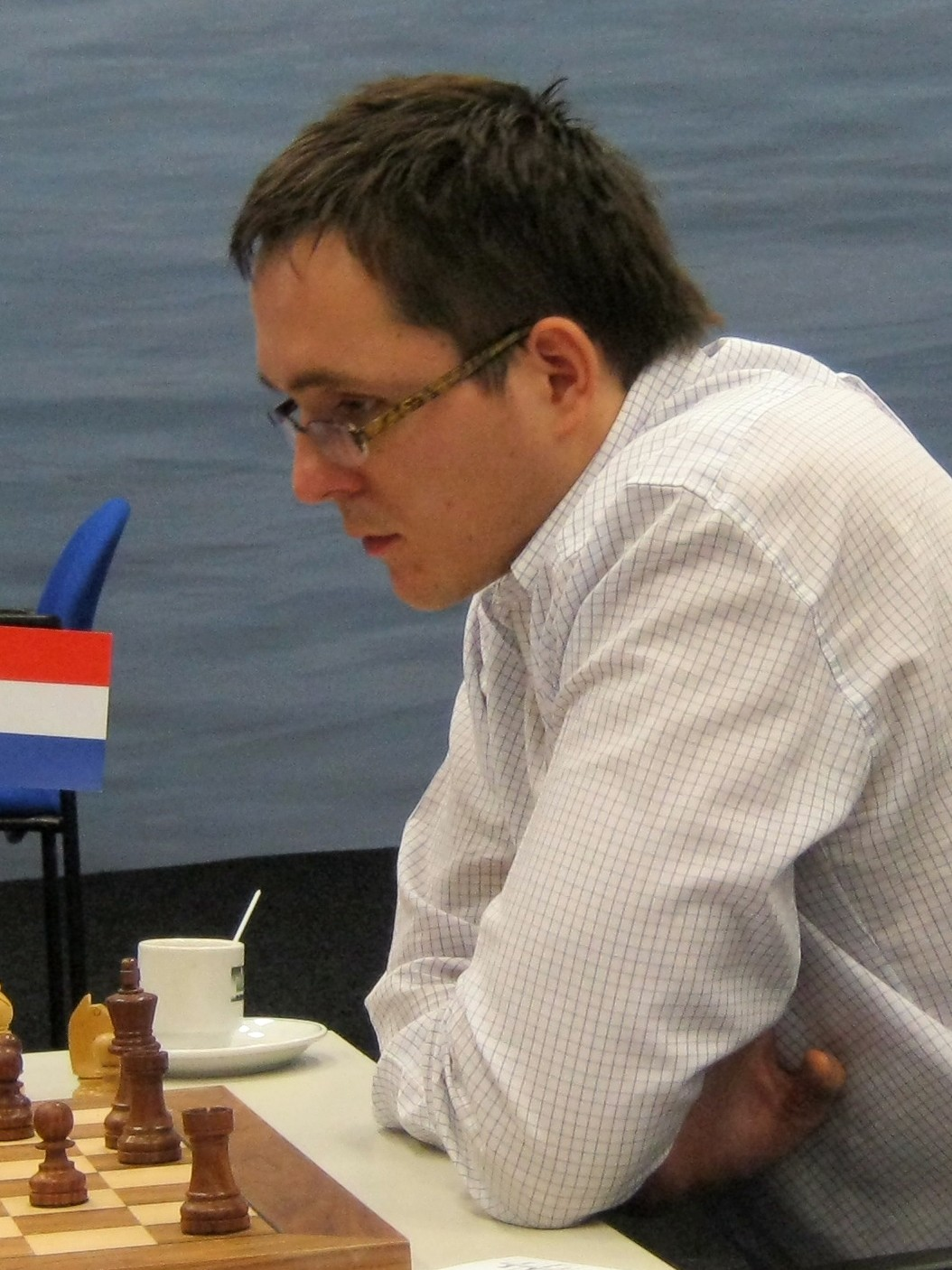
- Sipke Ernst in 2012

Personal information
- Born: 8 January 1979 (age 47) Damwâld, Netherlands

Chess career
- Country: Netherlands
- Title: Grandmaster (2007)
- FIDE rating: 2540 (July 2026)
- Peak rating: 2606 (January 2012)

Sipke Ernst (born 8 January 1979), is a Dutch chess Grandmaster, Dutch Chess Championship medalist, and FIDE Trainer.

== Biography ==
In the 2000s, Sipke Ernst was one of the leading Dutch chess players. He won four medals in the Dutch Chess Championship: a silver medal in 2017, and three bronze medals in 2010, 2011, and 2014, respectively. Ernst has won many international chess tournaments, including Lichfield in 2000 and Schaakfestival in Groningen in 2001, 2005, and 2006.

Ernst played for the Netherlands in the Chess Olympiad in 2002, at the second reserve board in the 35th Chess Olympiad in Bled (+0, =1, -0).

Ernst additionally played for the Netherlands in the European Team Chess Championship in 2009, at the reserve board in the 17th European Team Chess Championship in Novi Sad (+2, =2, -1).

In 1999, he was awarded the International Master title and received the Grandmaster title in 2007. In 2018, he became a FIDE Trainer.
