= Ljilja Drljević =

Serbian chess player (born 1984)

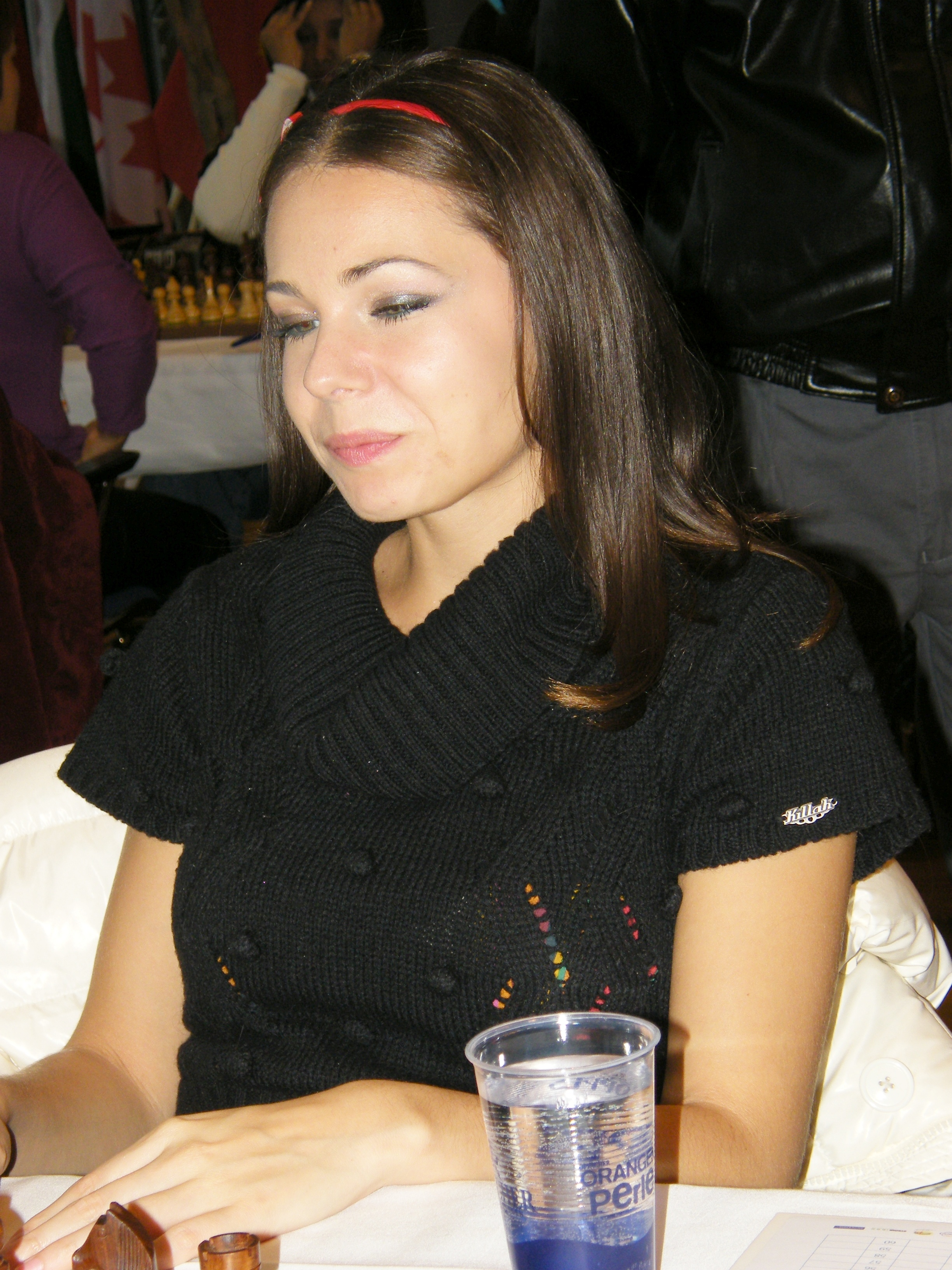
- Drljević in 2008

Personal information
- Born: 30 November 1984 (age 41) Belgrade, Yugoslavia

Chess career
- Country: Yugoslavia → Serbia and Montenegro (before 2006); Montenegro (2006−2009); Serbia (2009−present)
- Title: Woman International Master (2007); FIDE Instructor (2015)
- Peak rating: 2302 (May 2011)

Ljilja Drljević (Serbian Cyrillic: Љиља Дрљевић; born 30 November 1984) is a Serbian chess player who holds the title of Woman International Master (WIM, 2007). She won the Serbian Women's Chess Championship in 2016.

== Chess career ==
Drljević won the 2007 Mediterranean Women's Chess Championship in Sousse. In early 2009, she switched from the Montenegro Chess Federation to the Serbian Chess Federation. She was second in 2010 World Student Chess Championship in Zürich. After getting a bronze medal in the 2010 national women's championship in Pančevo, she finally won the Serbian Women's Chess Championship in 2016.

Ljilja Drljević played for Montenegro and Serbia in the Women's Chess Olympiads:

- In 2008, at second board in the 38th Chess Olympiad (women) in Dresden (+4, =1, -4),
- In 2016, at reserve board in the 42nd Chess Olympiad (women) in Baku (+5, =2, -2).

Ljilja Drljević played for Montenegro and Serbia in the European Team Chess Championships:

- In 2007, at first board in the 7th European Team Chess Championship (women) in Heraklion (+2, =1, -5),
- In 2011, at fourth board in the 9th European Team Chess Championship (women) in Porto Carras (+1, =3, -2).

Ljilja Drljević played for FR Yugoslavia in the European Girls' U18 Team Chess Championships:

- In 2000, at first board in the 1st European U18 Team Chess Championship (girls) in Balatonlelle (+2, =2, -3),
- In 2002, at second board in the 3rd European U18 Team Chess Championship (girls) in Balatonlelle (+4, =2, -1).

In 2007, she was awarded the FIDE Woman International Master (WIM) title and received the FIDE Instructor title in 2015.
