= Jovana Erić =

Serbian chess player (born 1992)

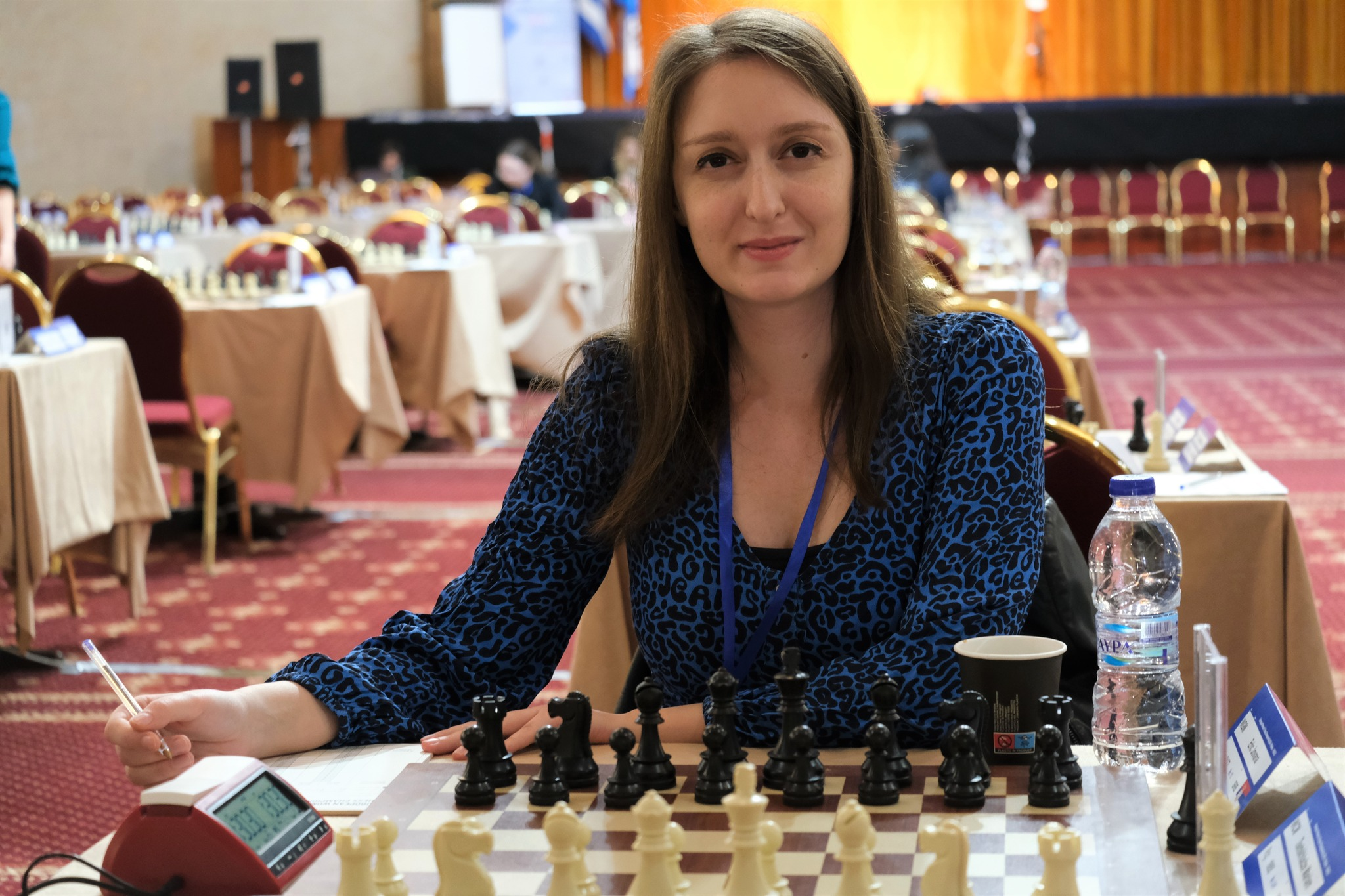
- Erić in 2024

Personal information
- Born: 22 January 1992 (age 34) Loznica, SR Serbia, SFR Yugoslavia

Chess career
- Country: Serbia
- Title: Woman Grandmaster (2018)
- Peak rating: 2342 (July 2018)

Jovana Erić (Serbian Cyrillic: Јована Ерић; born 22 January 1992) is a Serbian chess player who holds the FIDE title of Woman Grandmaster (WGM).

== Career ==
Erić learned to play chess at age six.

In 2008, Erić was awarded the title Woman FIDE Master. In 2010, she received the next highest title, Woman International Master. In 2018, Erić was awarded the title of Woman Grandmaster, the highest FIDE title given to women only.

Erić has participated in five Chess Olympiads for Serbia. In 2025, Erić published a book titled Chess Through My Eyes: Life Lessons Hidden in 64 Squares. Through her website, she offers additional instructional e-books.

Erić holds a master's degree in biology from the University of Belgrade.
