= Svetlana Prudnikova =

Russian-Serbian chess player (born 1967)

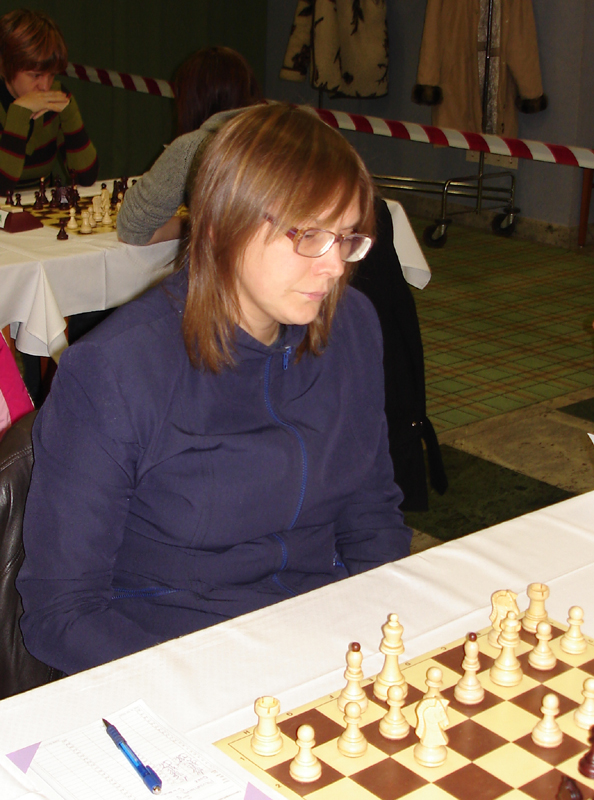
- Prudnikova in 2006

Personal information
- Born: 18 March 1967 (age 59)

Chess career
- Country: Russia; Serbia
- Title: Woman Grandmaster (1992)
- FIDE rating: 2174 (October 2021)
- Peak rating: 2428 (July 2000)

Svetlana Prudnikova (Russian: Светла́на Алекса́ндровна Пру́дникова, romanized: Svetlána Aleksándrovna Prúdnikova; born 18 March 1967) is a Russian-Serbian chess player holding the title of Woman Grandmaster (WGM).

She won twice both the Russian women's championship, in 1992 and 1998, and the FR Yugoslavia women's championship, in 2000 and 2002.

Prudnikova played for the Russian national team in the Women's Chess Olympiads of 1992 and 1996, contributing to a 3rd-place finish in the latter event. Representing her adopted country FR Yugoslavia in 2000, 2002 and 2004, she helped her team to reach a creditable 5th place at the 34th Chess Olympiad in 2000. She won two olympic individual gold medals playing board 2 in both occasions: in 1992 and 2002.

Her daughter, Tamara Čurović, is a tennis player and a member of the Serbia Fed Cup team.
