= Jovana Rapport =

Serbian chess player (born 1992)

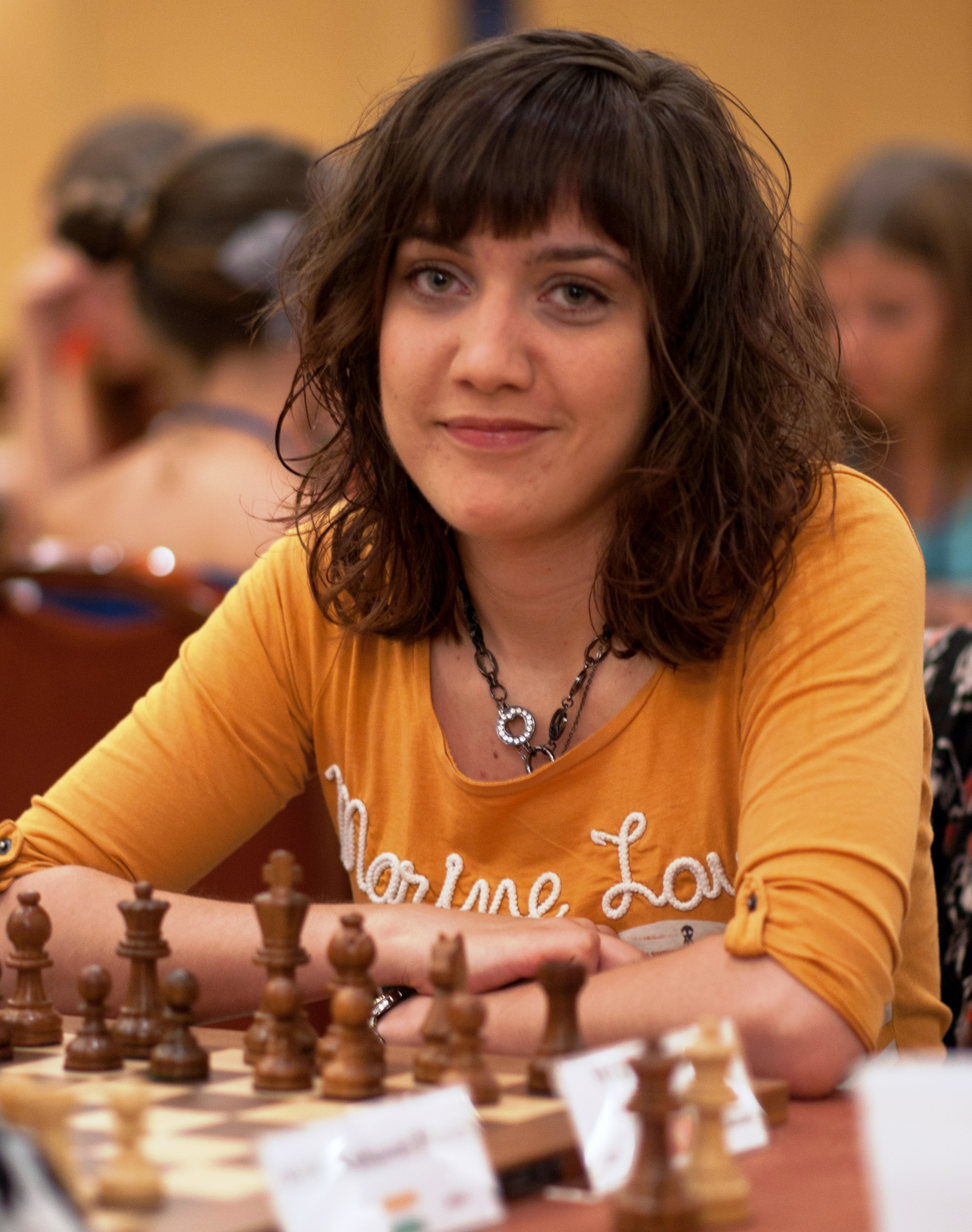
- Rapport in 2012

Personal information
- Born: Jovana Vojinović; 18 February 1992 (age 34) Trstenik, Yugoslavia
- Spouse: Richárd Rapport (m. 2016)

Chess career
- Country: FR Yugoslavia (until 2003); Serbia and Montenegro (2003–2006); Montenegro (2006–2013); Serbia (2013–2022; since 2026); Romania (2022–2024); Hungary (2024–2026)
- Title: Woman Grandmaster (2009)
- FIDE rating: 2324 (April 2023)
- Peak rating: 2388 (February 2019)
- Peak ranking: No. 73 woman (February 2019)

Jovana Rapport (née Vojinović; (Note: Serbian Cyrillic: Јована Војиновић.) born 18 February 1992) is a Serbian chess player. She holds the title of Woman Grandmaster (WGM), which FIDE awarded her in 2009. She is a two-time Montenegrin women's champion (2009, 2010) and also a Serbian women's champion (2014).

== Chess career ==
She participated in the European Youth Chess Championships and the World Youth Chess Championships in various age categories. Her best result was a third place in 2002 in Heraklion in the World Youth Championships in Girls U10 age category. When she did not make the Serbian team in 2006, she decided to switch her allegiance to Montenegro. She represented Montenegro in the European Girls' U18 Team Chess Championships (2007−2009) and won silver (2008) and bronze (2007) team medals, and won two gold (2008, 2009) and silver (2007) individual medals.

She won the 2009 Mediterranean Women's Chess Championship in Antalya. In 2011 in Pančevo, she won the international women's chess tournament.

In the Montenegrin Chess Championship for women, she has won four medals − two gold (2009, 2010), a silver (2008) and a bronze (2007). She switched back her national federation to her native Serbia in early 2013. In 2014, she won the Serbian Chess Championship for women.

Jovana Rapport played for Montenegro and Serbia in the Women's Chess Olympiads:

- In 2008, at first board in the 38th Chess Olympiad (women) in Dresden (+6, =3, -2),
- In 2010, at first board in the 39th Chess Olympiad (women) in Khanty-Mansiysk (+6, =2, -3),
- In 2012, at first board in the 40th Chess Olympiad (women) in Istanbul (+5, =6, -0),
- In 2014, at second board in the 41st Chess Olympiad (women) in Tromsø (+5, =1, -4),
- In 2016, at first board in the 42nd Chess Olympiad (women) in Baku (+5, =2, -3).

Jovana Rapport played for Montenegro and Serbia in the European Team Chess Championships:

- In 2007, at second board in the 7th European Team Chess Championship (women) in Heraklion (+1, =3, -4),
- In 2009, at first board in the 8th European Team Chess Championship (women) in Novi Sad (+3, =3, -3),
- In 2011, at first board in the 9th European Team Chess Championship (women) in Porto Carras (+4, =3, -2),
- In 2013, at third board in the 10th European Team Chess Championship (women) in Warsaw (+3, =1, -4),
- In 2015, at second board in the 11th European Team Chess Championship (women) in Reykjavík and won individual gold medal (+5, =3, -0).

In 2008, she was awarded the title of Woman International Master (WIM) by FIDE and received the title of Woman Grandmaster (WGM) the following year. She was the first woman representing Montenegro to be awarded the latter title.

Rapport achieved required norms for International Master (IM) title by late November 2015, but has yet to reach minimum rating (2400) for the title.

== Personal life ==
She married Hungarian chess grandmaster Richárd Rapport in June 2016 and they live in Belgrade, Serbia. In September 2022, the Rapports together decided to switch their federations to Romania. They switched back to Hungary in July 2024.
