= Irina Chelushkina =

Serbian chess player (born 1961)

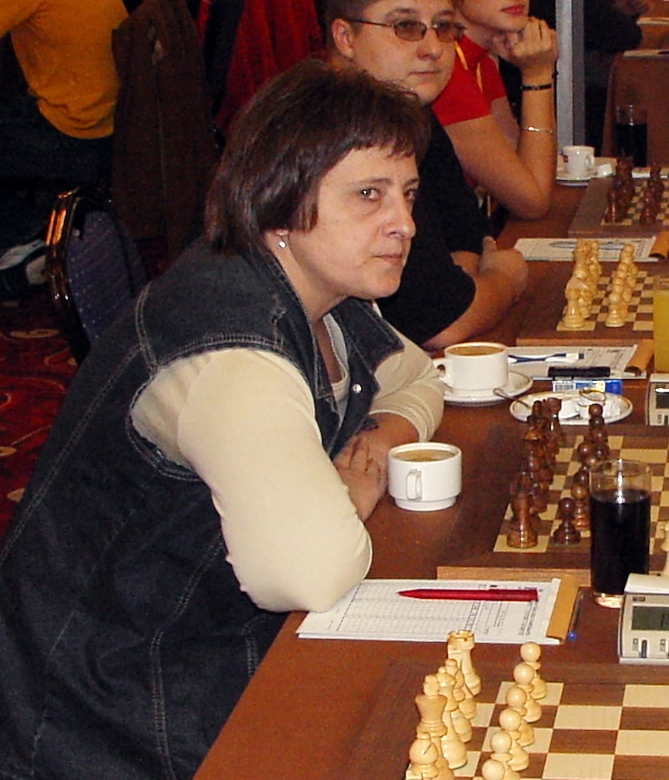
- Cheluskina in 2007

Personal information
- Born: 16 February 1961 (age 65) Kherson, Ukraine

Chess career
- Country: Soviet Union → Ukraine (before 1997); Yugoslavia → Serbia (after 1998)
- Title: Woman Grandmaster (1992)
- FIDE rating: 2183 (January 2022)
- Peak rating: 2415 (July 2000)

Irina Cheluskina (Ukrainian: Ірина Челушкіна, Iryna Chelushkina; Serbian Cyrillic: Ирина Челушкина, romanized: Irina Čeluškina; born 16 February 1961 in Kherson) is a Ukrainian and Serbian chess player and a Woman Grandmaster.

She has won the USSR Women's Chess Championship once, the Women's Yugoslav Chess Championship three times and the Serbian-Montenegrin championship twice, and the Women's Serbian Chess Championship in 2022.
