= Branko Damljanović =

Serbian chess grandmaster (born 1961)

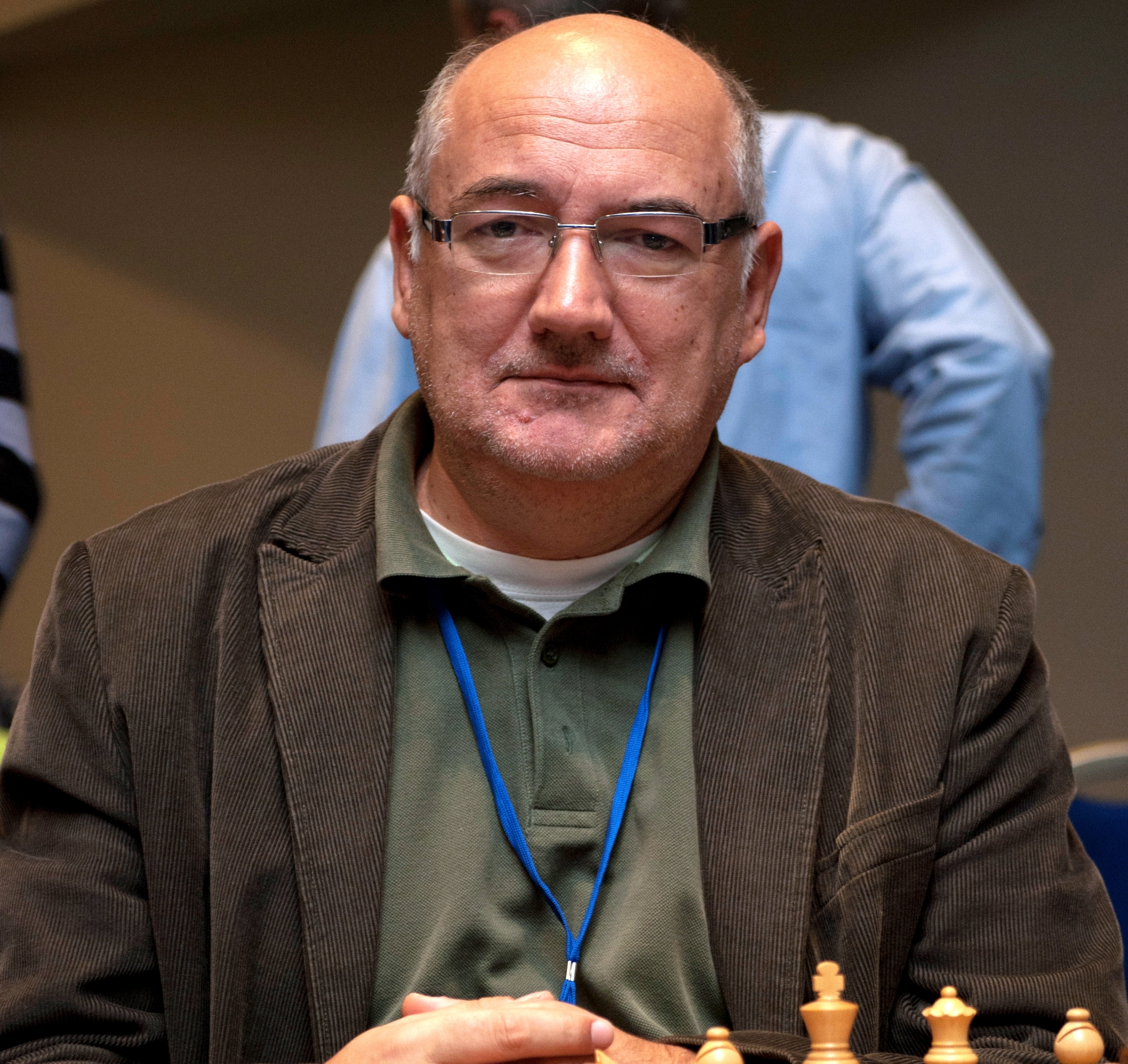
- Damljanović in 2011

Personal information
- Born: 17 June 1961 (age 65) Novi Sad, Yugoslavia

Chess career
- Country: Yugoslavia (until 1992); Serbia (since 1992)
- Title: Grandmaster (1989)
- Peak rating: 2625 (July 2006)
- Peak ranking: No. 37 (July 1988)

Branko Damljanović (Serbian Cyrillic: Бранко Дамљановић; born 17 June 1961) is a Serbian chess grandmaster. His rating peaked at 2625 in July 2006. His chess career started in 1975 in Čačak. He is now a selector.
