= Daniel Gormally =

English chess grandmaster (born 1976)

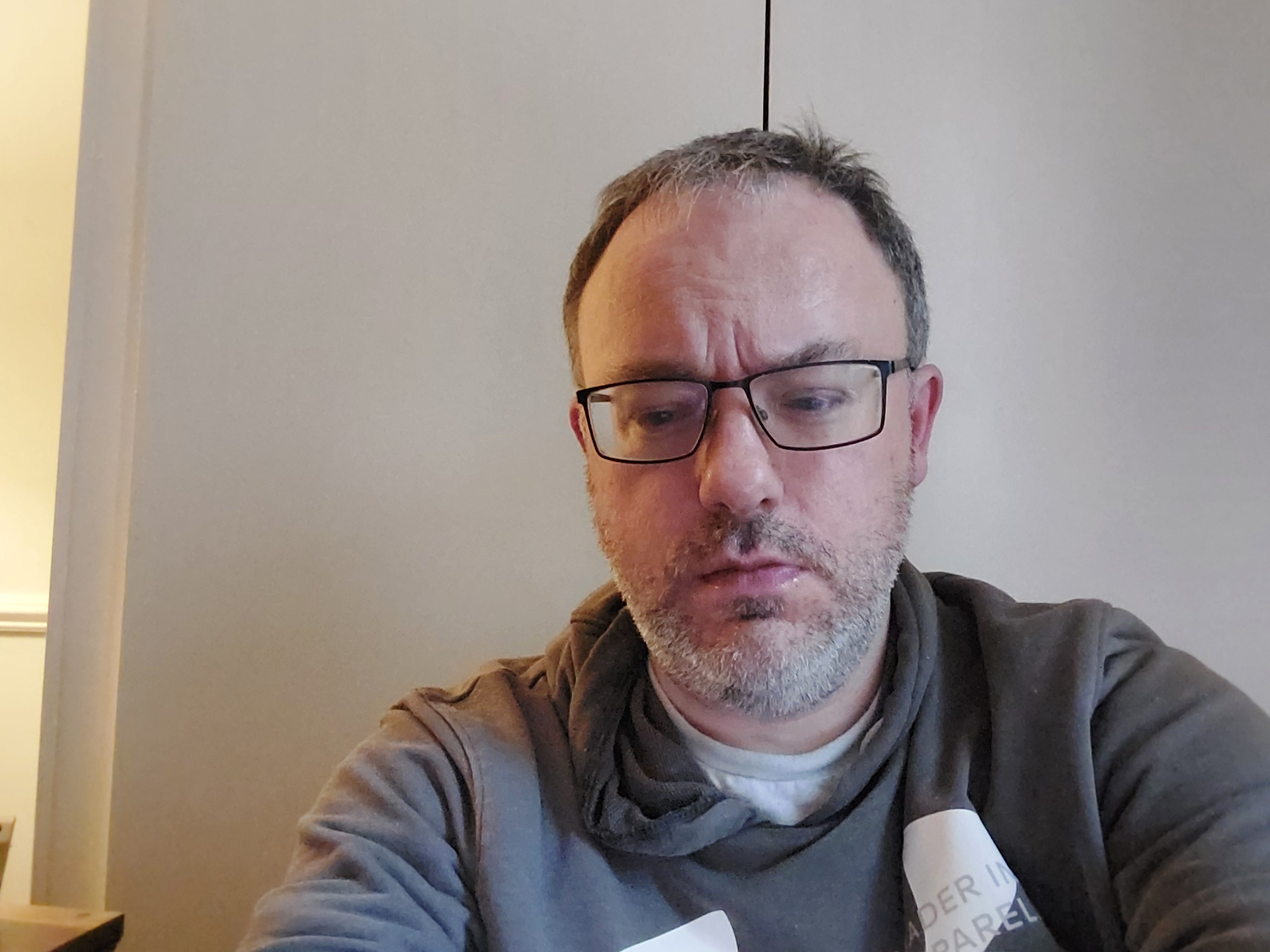

Personal information
- Born: Daniel William Gormally; 4 May 1976 (age 50) South Shields, England

Chess career
- Country: England
- Title: Grandmaster (2005)
- Peak rating: 2573 (January 2006)

Daniel William Gormally (born 4 May 1976) is an English chess Grandmaster. His peak rating is 2573, achieved in the January 2006 rating list.

== Chess career ==
Daniel was born in Hertford hospital, but soon moved to London. He first learned chess at approximately seven years old, when his father Torsten taught him and his older sister.

He shared first place at the Politiken Cup in 1998 and won the Challengers tournament of the 78th Hastings International Chess Congress in 2003.

In September 2006, he tied for 2nd-9th with Luke McShane, Stephen J. Gordon, Gawain Jones, Šarūnas Šulskis, Luís Galego, Klaus Bischoff and Karel van der Weide in the 2nd EU Individual Championship in Liverpool. In November 2006, Gormally was joint winner of the British Rapidplay Chess Championship.

In 2015, he tied for the second place with David Howell and Nicholas Pert in the 102nd British Championship and eventually finished fourth on tiebreak. Also in 2015, he appeared as a contestant in three episodes of the television quiz Fifteen To One and in one episode of The Chase, alongside a brief appearance on Beat the Pack in 2013.

Gormally played for the English national team in the 2005 European Team Chess Championship and 2006 Chess Olympiad.

== Bibliography ==
- Gormally, Danny (2010). Play Chess Like the PROs. Everyman Chess. ISBN 978-1857446272.
- Gormally, Danny (2010). Calculate Like a Grandmaster. Batsford. ISBN 9781906388690.
- Gormally, Danny (2014). Mating the Castled King. Quality Chess. ISBN 978-1-907982-71-2.
- Gormally, Daniel (2016). Insanity, Passion and Addiction - A Year Inside the Chess World. Chess Evolution. ISBN 978-83-934656-9-9.
