= Karel van der Weide =

Dutch chess grandmaster (born 1973)

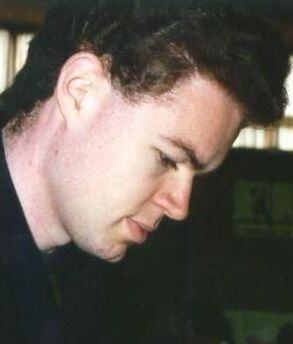
- van der Weide in 2004

Personal information
- Born: August 11, 1973 (age 53) Amsterdam, Netherlands

Chess career
- Country: Netherlands
- Title: Grandmaster (2004)
- FIDE rating: 2421 (October 2026)
- Peak rating: 2512 (July 2007)

Karel van der Weide is a Dutch chess grandmaster and author.

== Chess career ==
=== Player ===
In September 2006, he tied for 2nd–9th with Luke McShane, Stephen J. Gordon, Gawain Jones, Luis Galego, Daniel Gormally, Klaus Bischoff and Šarūnas Šulskis in the 2nd EU Individual Open Chess Championship in Liverpool.

In January 2007, he won the 32nd Ciudad de Sevilla on tiebreaks over Daniel Cámpora.

In June 2022, he held a simultaneous exhibition against 25 players at the Chess Club Vredeburg. He won 18 games, drew 4, and lost 3.

=== Author ===
He has written a number of chess books, including Een schaakleven in 100 partijen and Schaken voor huisvrouwen.
