= Šarūnas Šulskis =

Lithuanian chess grandmaster (born 1972)

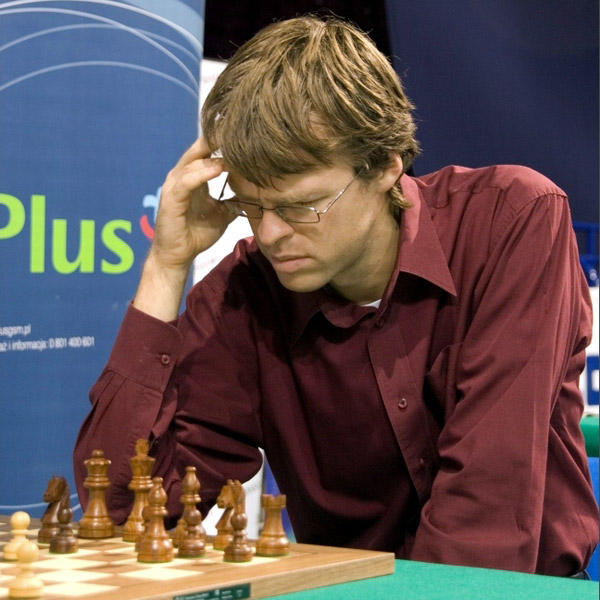

Personal information
- Born: 26 November 1972 (age 53) Kėdainiai, Lithuania

Chess career
- Country: Lithuania
- Title: Grandmaster (1996)
- FIDE rating: 2458 (July 2026)
- Peak rating: 2596 (March 2012)

Šarūnas Šulskis (born 26 November 1972) is a Lithuanian chess Grandmaster (1996).

== Chess career ==
He won the Lithuanian Chess Championship on five occasions: in 1991, 1994, 1998 (shared with Vidmantas Mališauskas), 2007 and 2009, played for Lithuania in the Chess Olympiads of 1994, 1996, 1998, 2002, 2004, 2008 and 2010 and in the European Team Chess Championships of 1997, 2005, 2007, 2009 and 2011.

In 2006, he tied for 2nd–9th with Luke McShane, Stephen J. Gordon, Gawain Jones, Luis Galego, Danny Gormally, Klaus Bischoff and Karel van der Weide in the 2nd EU Individual Open Chess Championship in Liverpool. In 2011 he won the Guernsey International Chess Festival. In 2019 he was 2nd in Riga Technical University Open.

== Chess strength ==
According to Chessmetrics, at his peak in August 2003 Šulskis's play was equivalent to a rating of 2627, and he was ranked number 75 in the world. His best single performance was at Goodricke 13th op Calcutta, 2002, where he scored 8,5 of 11 possible points (77%) against 2555-rated opposition, for a performance rating of 2697.

In the January 2012 FIDE list, he has an Elo rating of 2595, making him Lithuania's number one.

== Notable games ==
- Sarunas Sulskis vs Johann Hjartarson, Groningen, FIDE WCH k.o NED 1997, French Defense: Winawer (C16), 1/2-1/2
- Emory A Tate vs Sarunas Sulskis, Continental Open 2001, Gunderam Defense: General (C40), 0-1
- Sarunas Sulskis vs Mark A Berkovich, 20th Cappelle la Grande 2004, Italian Game: Two Knights Defense (C55), 1/2-1/2
- Sarunas Sulskis vs Thomas Michalczak, 6th EU Ch. 2005, Russian Game: Cochrane Gambit (C42), 1-0
