= Klaus Bischoff =

German chess grandmaster (born 1961)

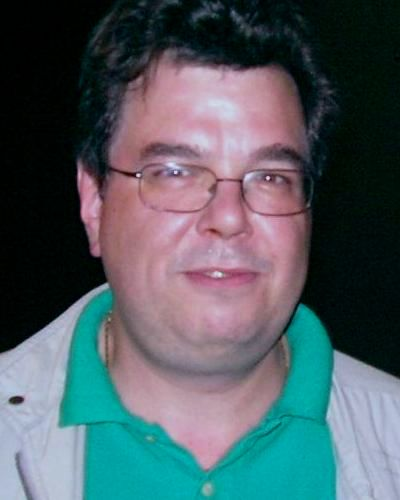
- Bischoff at Dortmund 2009

Personal information
- Born: 9 June 1961 (age 65) Ulm, West Germany

Chess career
- Country: Germany
- Title: Grandmaster (1990)
- FIDE rating: 2419 (July 2026)
- Peak rating: 2569 (November 2009)

Klaus Bischoff (born 9 June 1961 in Ulm) is a German chess player who was awarded the Grandmaster title by FIDE in 1990.

In international tournaments, he has taken a share of first place on a number of occasions, including Kecskemét 1988, Arosa 1996, Recklinghausen 1999, Essen 2000, Bad Zwesten 2003 and Bad Zwesten again in 2005. In 2006, he tied for 2nd-9th with Luke McShane, Stephen J. Gordon, Gawain Jones, Šarūnas Šulskis, Luís Galego, Daniel Gormally and Karel van der Weide in the 2nd EU Individual Open Chess Championship in Liverpool.

He is a noted expert at rapid chess and is an eleven-time champion of Germany's blitz chess championship. In 1999, he shared first place at the prestigious Essen Rapidplay event with Vladimir Epishin.

Bischoff won the standard German Chess Championship in 2013 and 2015.

Also a competitor in team chess events, he was part of the German team that took the silver medal at the 34th Chess Olympiad in Istanbul 2000 and twice the bronze medal at the European Team Chess Championship, in 1989 and 2001.
