= Luís Galego =

Portuguese chess grandmaster (born 1956)

Personal information
- Born: April 25, 1966 (age 60) Porto, Portugal

Chess career
- Country: Portugal
- Title: Grandmaster (2002)
- Peak rating: 2543 (April 2006)

Luís Galego (born 25 April 1966 in Porto, Portugal) is a Portuguese chess grandmaster. He represented Portugal in ten Chess Olympiads (at top board since 2002), achieved a peak Elo rating of 2543, and was national champion five times, most recently in 2012.

In 2006, he tied for 2nd–9th with Luke McShane, Stephen J. Gordon, Gawain Jones, Šarūnas Šulskis, Danny Gormally, Klaus Bischoff and Karel van der Weide in the 2nd EU Individual Open Chess Championship in Liverpool.

As of March 2011, his rating is 2500, making him Portugal's top player.
