= Portuguese Chess Championship =

The Portuguese Chess Championship is a yearly national chess championship of Portugal. It was established in 1911, but only from the 1950s it was played yearly, with a few exceptions.

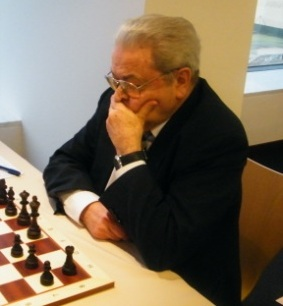
IM Joaquim Durão, Portuguese champion on 13 occasions

Nr	Year	Location	Champion	Location	Women's Ch.
1	1911		António Maria Pires		
2	1926		Mário Machado		
3	1940		João Moura		
4	1942		Carlos Pires		
5	1944		Carlos Pires		
6	1946		Mário Machado		
7	1947		Leonel Pias		
8	1948		Mário Machado		
9	1951		João Moura		
10	1952		João Moura		
11	1953		Daniel De Oliveira		
12	1954		João Mário Ribeiro		
13	1955		Joaquim Durão		
14	1956		Joaquim Durão		
15	1958		Joaquim Durão		
16	1959		Joaquim Durão		
17	1960		Joaquim Durão		
18	1961		Joaquim Durão		
19	1962		Joaquim Durão		
20	1963		João Mário Ribeiro		
21	1964		Joaquim Durão		
22	1965		Joaquim Durão		
23	1966		João Maria Cordovil		
24	1967		João Maria Cordovil		
25	1968		Joaquim Durão		
26	1969		João Maria Cordovil		
27	1970		Joaquim Durão		
28	1971		João Mário Ribeiro		
29	1972		Joaquim Durão		
30	1973		Joaquim Durão		
31	1975		Fernando Silva		
32	1976		Fernando Silva		
33	1977		Fernando Silva		
34	1978		Luís Santos		
35	1979		Luís Santos		
36	1980		António Fernandes		
37	1981		Fernando Silva		
38	1982	Mangualde	Luís Santos		
39	1983		António Fernandes		
40	1984	Lisbon	António Fernandes		
41	1985		António Fernandes		
42	1986		Rui Dâmaso		
43	1987		Fernando Silva		
44	1988		António Antunes		
45	1989		António Fernandes		
46	1990		António Fernandes		
47	1991		António Fernandes		
48	1992	Lisbon	António Fernandes		
49	1993		IM Rui Dâmaso		
50	1994		Luís Galego	Marinha Grande	Tania Saraiva
51	1995		IM Rui Dâmaso	Faro	Aida Ferreira
52	1996		António Fernandes	Matosinhos	Alda Carvalho
53	1997		Fernando Silva		Tânia Saraiva
54	1998		Carlos Pereira dos Santos		Alda Carvalho
55	1999		IM Rui Dâmaso		Catarina Leite
56	2000		Carlos Pereira dos Santos		Catarina Leite
57	2001		António Fernandes		Catarina Leite
58	2002		Luís Galego		Catarina Leite
59	2003		Diogo Fernando		Catarina Leite
60	2004		Luís Galego		Catarina Leite
61	2005	Vila Real	Luís Galego		Catarina Leite
62	2006		GM António Fernandes		Catarina Leite
63	2007		IM Rui Dâmaso	Beja	Margarida Coimbra
64	2008	Amadora	GM António Fernandes		WFM Ana Baptista
64	2009	Amadora	IM Rúben Pereira		Ana Baptista
64	2010	Amadora	FM Paulo Dias	Espinho	Ana Ferreira
65	2011	Amadora	IM Paulo Dias	Vila Nova de Foz Coa	Margarida Coimbra
66	2012	Pampilhosa da Serra	GM Luís Galego	Lisbon	Catarina Leite
67	2013	Lisbon	IM Rui Dâmaso	Aveiro	Maria Inês Oliveira
68	2014	Lisbon	GM António Fernandes	Lisbon	Maria Inês Oliveira
69	2015	Lisbon	GM António Fernandes	Pedras Salgadas	Ana Inês Silva
70	2016	Barcelos	GM António Fernandes	Matosinhos	WFM Ana Baptista
71	2017	Gaia	IM André Ventura Sousa	Gaia	WFM Ana Baptista
72	2018	Braga	GM António Fernandes	Braga	WFM Ariana Pintor
73	2019	Portimão	IM André Ventura Sousa	Portimão	WCM Mariana Silva
74	2020	Odivelas	IM André Ventura Sousa	Odivelas	Sara Soares
75	2021	Évora	IM André Ventura Sousa	Évora	Filipa Pipiras
76	2022	Leiria	IM André Ventura Sousa	Leiria	WCM Mariana Silva
77	2023	Coimbra	FM José Guilherme Santos	Famalicão	WCM Mariana Silva
78	2024	Viseu	Cancelled after 2 rounds	Famalicão	WFM Inês Silva
79	225	Matosinhos	IM André Ventura Sousa	Famalicão	WFM Camila Avelino

The 2011 championship was decided in a match between IM Paulo Dias and FM José Padeiro, held 21–24 October 2011 in Coimbra.

The 2013 championship was decided in a match between IM Sérgio Rocha and IM Rui Dâmaso held 2–4 October 2013 in Barreiro.
