= Jorge Viterbo Ferreira =

Portuguese chess grandmaster (born 1994)

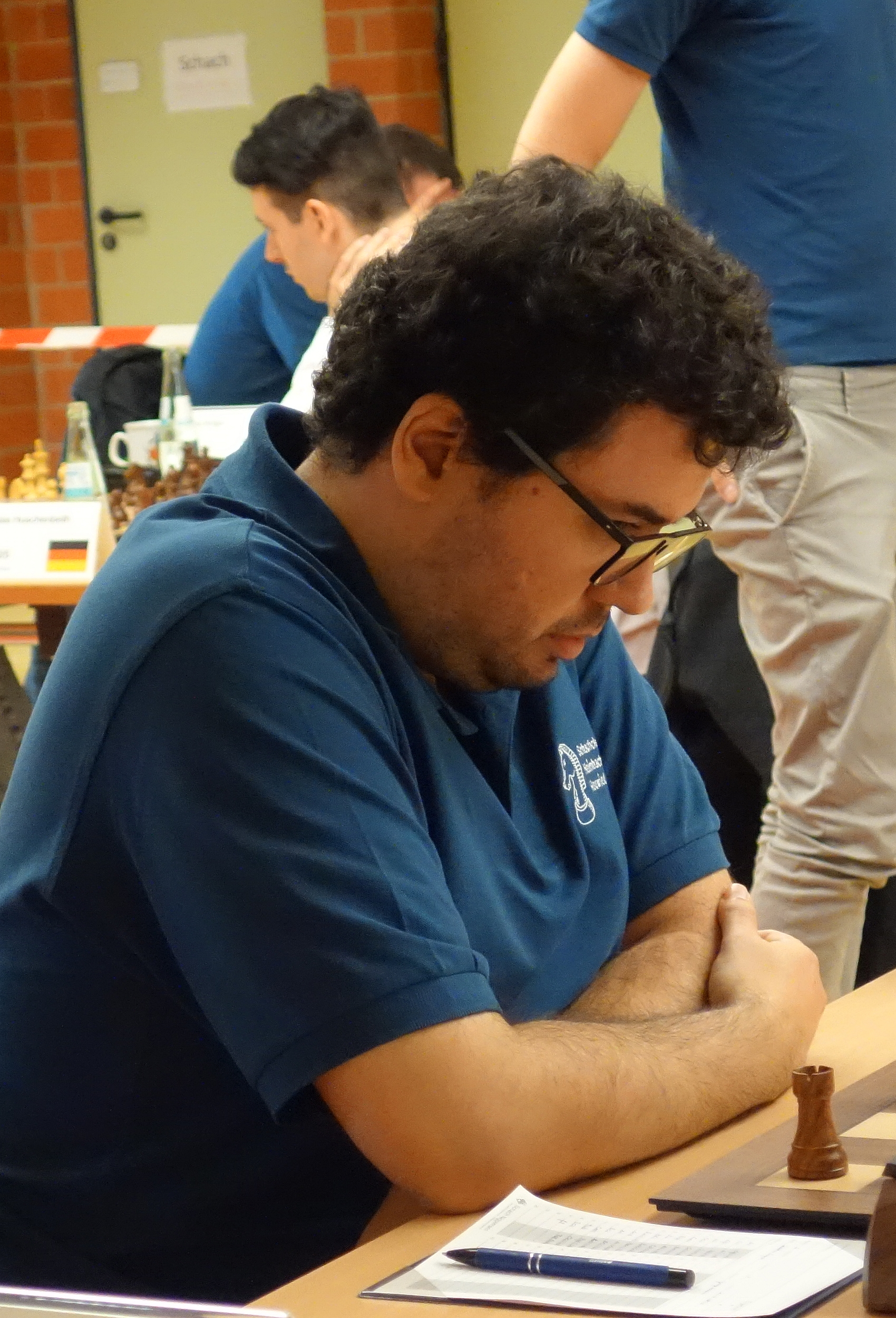

Personal information
- Born: 24 June 1994 (age 32) Porto, Portugal

Chess career
- Country: Portugal
- Title: Grandmaster (2018)
- FIDE rating: 2525 (July 2026)
- Peak rating: 2549 (April 2025)

Jorge Viterbo Ferreira (born 24 June 1994) is a Portuguese chess grandmaster. Viterbo Ferreira became a FIDE Master in 2010, an International Master in 2013, and a Grandmaster in 2018. He represented Portugal at the Chess Olympiad in 2012, 2014, 2016, 2022, and 2024. As of October 2024, Viterbo Ferreira is the highest FIDE rated Portuguese player. He was the fourth Portuguese player to obtain the Grandmaster title.

He started playing chess at 11 years old in school, and became district vice-champion with the same age. At 14 years of age, he became the youngest ever Porto district championship. In 2011, he became national under-18 champion and was eleventh in the European under-18 championship. His best placement in the Portuguese Chess Championship was the second place in 2014, 2015, and 2021. He was once coached by Kevin Spraggett. The highest rated player he defeated is Iván Salgado López.

Viterbo Ferreira studied physics for a year in the University of Porto, and then changed his degree to philosophy. He completed an MSc in Logic at the University of Amsterdam, and started a PhD in the Department of Philosophy of New York University in 2018, where he studied with David Chalmers until 2024.
