= London Chess Classic =

Chess festival held in London

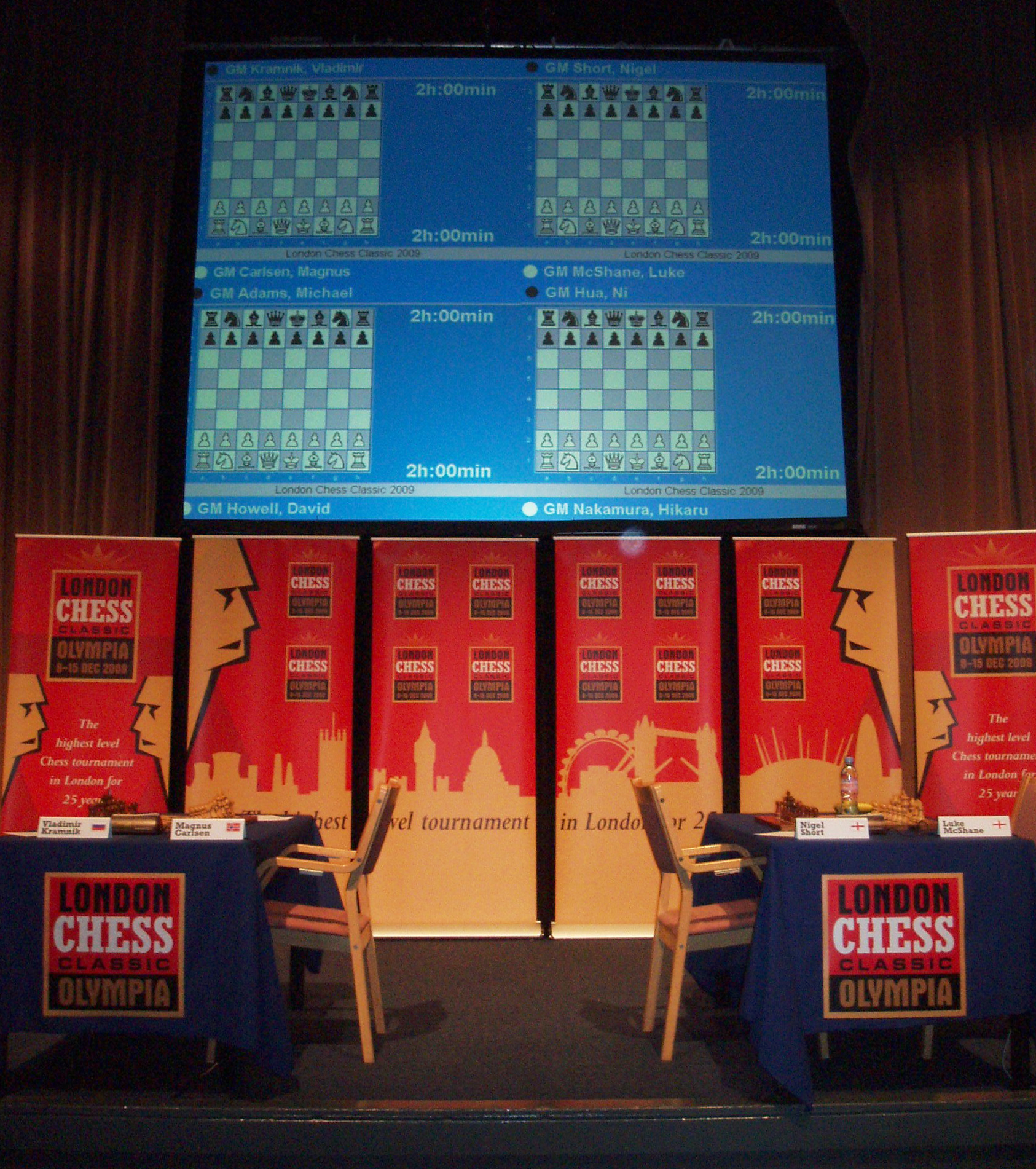
- Playing stage before the opening round, 2009

Tournament information
- Sport: Chess
- Location: London, United Kingdom
- Established: 2009
- Most championships: (Norway) Magnus Carlsen (4)

Current champion
- (Uzbekistan) Nodirbek Abdusattorov

The London Chess Classic is a chess festival held at the Olympia Conference Centre, West Kensington, London. The flagship event is a strong invitational tournament between some of the world's top grandmasters. A number of subsidiary events cover a wide range of chess activities, including tournaments suitable for norm and title seekers, junior events, amateur competitions, simultaneous exhibitions, coaching, and lectures.

In 2015, the London Chess Classic was one of the three events that comprised the inaugural Grand Chess Tour, the other two being Norway Chess and the Sinquefield Cup.

There was no event in 2020 and 2022. 2021 saw a match between England and the Rest of the World. In 2023 the London Chess Classic returned to the invitational format.

== Winners ==
#	Year	Winner
1	2009	Magnus Carlsen (Norway)
2	2010	Magnus Carlsen (Norway)
3	2011	Vladimir Kramnik (Russia)
4	2012	Magnus Carlsen (Norway)
5	2013	Hikaru Nakamura (United States)
6	2014	Viswanathan Anand (India)
7	2015	Magnus Carlsen (Norway)
8	2016	Wesley So (United States)
9	2017	Fabiano Caruana (United States)
10	2018	Hikaru Nakamura (United States)
11	2019	Ding Liren (China)
12	2021	No individual event
13	2023	Michael Adams (England)
14	2024	Gawain Maroroa Jones (England)
15	2025	Nodirbek Abdusattorov (Uzbekistan)

== 2009 Classic: 8–15 December ==
The inaugural 2009 edition was advertised as "the highest level chess tournament in London for 25 years", referring to the Phillips & Drew Kings tournament held in 1984. It was held during the same time as the Chess World Cup 2009.

The field of eight grandmasters comprised the top four English players, and four international players, with top billing going to the former World Champion Vladimir Kramnik, plus the future World Champion and then-current number one in the live world rankings, Magnus Carlsen. The tournament was FIDE Category 18, and had a prize fund of 100,000 Euros including daily best game prizes and a 10,000 Euro brilliancy prize for the game voted the best of the tournament. The games were broadcast live at a number of sites including Playchess and the Internet Chess Club (with live expert commentary provided by Chess.FM).

A major feature of the tournament was the use of a different scoring system, sometimes referred to as "Bilbao Rules"; players earn three points for a win, one for a draw and none for a loss. "Sofia Rules" also applied, whereby the players could not agree a draw without the arbiter's permission, only to be given when there was deemed to be no purposeful play left in the position. With the added incentive of lucrative best game prizes, the intention was to maximise the potential for entertaining and decisive games. There were 17 draws and 11 decisive games.

The tournament was won by Magnus Carlsen, a victory that meant he would be world number one in the January 2010 FIDE world rankings list. Second place was taken by Vladimir Kramnik, and third place by David Howell, on tie-break from Michael Adams. The prizegiving took place at Simpson's-in-the-Strand, where Carlsen received a trophy and a cheque for the first prize (25,000 Euros). A trophy and 10,000 Euros brilliancy prize was presented to Luke McShane for his round five win against Hikaru Nakamura. The organisers announced that there would be another tournament in London in 2010.

The tournament organiser and director was International Master Malcolm Pein, manager of the London Chess Centre and the executive editor of CHESS magazine. The Festival Organiser was Adam Raoof, FIDE Organiser and Arbiter. The guest of honour was Victor Korchnoi. The ceremonial opening move was made by Evan Harris, MP. Tournament partners included Chessbase and the Internet Chess Club. The main pre-tournament public relations event comprised a blindfold display at the London Eye between Nigel Short and Luke McShane.

The tournament was simultaneous broadcast on London Chess Classic website, and the chess servers ICC, FICS and Playchess, as well as on Twitter.

=== Participants ===
- Magnus Carlsen, number one in the live world rankings
- Vladimir Kramnik, former world champion (2000–2007)
- Hikaru Nakamura, US champion
- Nigel Short, former world championship finalist and English number one
- Michael Adams, former world knock-out championship finalist and English number two
- Ni Hua, leading Chinese grandmaster
- Luke McShane, English number three
- David Howell, British champion and English number four

=== Tournament table ===
1st London Chess Classic, 8–16 December 2009, London, England, Category XVIII (2696)
	Player	Rating	1	2	3	4	5	6	7	8	Points	Wins	Black	TPR
1	Magnus Carlsen (Norway)	2801		3	1	1	3	3	1	1	13			2839
2	Vladimir Kramnik (Russia)	2772	0		1	1	3	3	1	3	12			2787
3	David Howell (England)	2597	1	1		1	1	3	1	1	9	1	1	2760
4	Michael Adams (England)	2698	1	1	1		3	1	1	1	9	1	0	2746
5	Luke McShane (England)	2615	0	0	1	0		0	3	3	7			2606
6	Ni Hua (China)	2665	0	0	0	1	3		1	1	6	1		2599
7	Hikaru Nakamura (United States)	2715	1	1	1	1	0	1		1	6	0		2644
8	Nigel Short (England)	2707	1	0	1	1	0	1	1		5			2593

=== Subsidiary events ===
Other tournaments organised during the festival included the nine-round Women's Invitational competition and nine-round FIDE Rated Open, which were won by Arianne Caoili of Australia and Jon Ludvig Hammer of Norway respectively, both with scores of 8/9.

Korchnoi gave two simultaneous displays during the event. To raise money for charity, one ticket to play him was auctioned on eBay for £410.

== 2010 Classic: 8–15 December ==
The 2010 edition was publicised as "The UK's strongest chess tournament ever". The prize fund was substantially increased from the previous year and world champion Viswanathan Anand replaced Ni Hua in the list of participants. Coupled with the advances in rating of some of the competitors, the effect was to elevate the tournament's status to Category 21 on FIDE's scale, making it the strongest ever held in the United Kingdom.

The ceremonial first move was performed by the Indian High Commissioner, HE Mr Nalin Surie, and the format remained faithful to the previous year, adopting the three points for a win, one for a draw scoring system and 'Sofia Rules' in respect to agreed draws.

Live expert commentary was provided to an audience of up to 400 at the venue itself and was also put out as a live web transmission. Lawrence Trent, Stephen Gordon, Daniel King and Chris Ward formed the core of the commentary team, but there were numerous contributions from other distinguished players, including guests of honour, Viktor Korchnoi and Garry Kasparov.

The tournament was won by Magnus Carlsen, cementing his return to the world number one spot in the rankings. Anand and Luke McShane shared second place, and had the tournament been scored in the conventional way, then all three would have shared first place. The prize giving was once again held at Simpsons-in-the-Strand, Carlsen being presented with the trophy and a cheque for 50,000 Euros by his part-time trainer and mentor, Kasparov.

The tournament organiser and director was IM Malcolm Pein, manager of the London Chess Centre and the executive editor of CHESS magazine. The Festival Organiser was Adam Raoof, FIDE Organiser and Arbiter. The 2010 Festival won the English Chess Federation Congress of the Year Award. The tournament was simultaneously broadcast on London Chess Classic website, and the chess servers ICC, FICS and Playchess, as well as on Twitter and Facebook.

=== Participants ===
- Viswanathan Anand, world champion
- Magnus Carlsen, number two in the world rankings
- Vladimir Kramnik, former world champion (2000–2007)
- Hikaru Nakamura, US number one
- Michael Adams, British champion and English number one
- Nigel Short, former world championship finalist and English number two
- Luke McShane, English number three
- David Howell, English number four

=== Tournament table ===
2nd London Chess Classic, 6–15 December 2010, London, England, Category XIX (2725)
	Player	Rating	1	2	3	4	5	6	7	8	Points	GmBl	WiBl	Wins	H2H	TPR	Place
1	Magnus Carlsen (Norway)	2802		0	0	3	1	3	3	3	13					2816	1
2	Viswanathan Anand (India)	2804	3		1	1	1	1	1	3	11	3	1	2	1	2815	2–3
3	Luke McShane (England)	2645	3	1		1	1	1	1	3	11	3	1	2	1	2838	2–3
4	Hikaru Nakamura (United States)	2741	0	1	1		3	1	1	3	10	4	1	2	3	2772	4
5	Vladimir Kramnik (Russia)	2791	1	1	1	0		1	3	3	10	4	1	2	0	2765	5
6	Michael Adams (England)	2723	0	1	1	1	1		3	1	8					2725	6
7	David Howell (England)	2611	0	1	1	0	1	0		1	4					2583	7
8	Nigel Short (England)	2680	0	0	0	0	0	1	1		2					2422	8

=== Subsidiary events ===
Other tournaments organised during the festival included the nine-round Women's Invitational competition and nine-round "FIDE Rated Open". WIM Arlette Van Weersel of The Netherlands won the former with 8/9, while GMs Gawain Jones and Simon Williams (both England) shared victory in the Open with 7½/9.

Korchnoi gave two simultaneous displays during the event and evening lectures were provided by GMs Jacob Aagaard and Boris Avrukh.

== 2011 Classic: 3–12 December ==
The third edition once again featured the strongest chess tournament ever held in the UK. Organiser Malcolm Pein added a ninth player, the world number three Armenian Grandmaster Levon Aronian, ensuring that the world's top four players participated. With two extra rounds scheduled, play spanned two weekends and each day, one player sat out and joined the commentary team. Kramnik emerged the clear winner with 16 points.

=== Participants ===
- Viswanathan Anand, world champion and number two in the world rankings
- Magnus Carlsen, number one in the world rankings
- Levon Aronian, number three in the world rankings
- Vladimir Kramnik, former world champion (2000–2007) and world number four
- Hikaru Nakamura, US number one
- Michael Adams, British champion and English number one
- Nigel Short, former world championship finalist and English number two
- Luke McShane, English number three
- David Howell, English number four

=== Tournament table ===
3rd London Chess Classic, 3–12 December 2011, London, England, Category XX (2748)
	Player	Rating	1	2	3	4	5	6	7	8	9	Points	Wins	Black	TPR
1	Vladimir Kramnik (Russia)	2800		1	1	3	1	1	3	3	3	16			2935
2	Hikaru Nakamura (United States)	2758	1		0	1	3	3	1	3	3	15			2888
3	Magnus Carlsen (Norway)	2826	1	3		1	1	1	1	3	3	14			2879
4	Luke McShane (England)	2671	0	1	1		1	1	3	3	3	13			2853
5	Viswanathan Anand (India)	2811	1	0	1	1		1	3	1	1	9	1	1	2740
6	Levon Aronian (Armenia)	2802	1	0	1	1	1		3	1	1	9	1	0	2741
7	Nigel Short (England)	2698	0	1	1	0	0	0		1	3	6			2613
8	David Howell (England)	2633	0	0	0	0	1	1	1		1	4			2570
9	Michael Adams (England)	2734	0	0	0	0	1	1	0	1		3			2499

=== Subsidiary events ===
Other tournaments organised during the festival included the nine-round Women's Invitational competition and nine-round "FIDE Rated Open". IM Dagnė Čiukšytė (2327) of England and WIM Guliskhan Nakhbayeva (2227) of Kazakhstan shared victory in the former with 7½/9, while Indian GM Abhijeet Gupta (2640) was outright winner of the Open with 8/9.

== 2012 Classic: 1–10 December ==
The format of the fourth edition closely followed that of the third. The winner was number one ranked Magnus Carlsen, whose performance also secured him the highest FIDE rating of all time. Scoring was done with Bilbao system, with 3 points awarded for a win, 1 point for a draw, and 0 for a loss.

The line-up for the headlining Classic tournament contained two changes from the previous year and comprised;

=== Participants ===
- Viswanathan Anand, world champion
- Magnus Carlsen, number one in the world rankings
- Levon Aronian, number two in the world rankings
- Vladimir Kramnik, former world champion (2000–2007) and world number three
- Hikaru Nakamura U.S. number two
- Judit Polgar, highest ranked woman
- Michael Adams, English number two
- Luke McShane, English number one
- Gawain Jones, British Champion and English number four

=== Tournament table ===
4th London Chess Classic, 1–10 December 2012, London, England, Category XXI (2752)
	Player	Rating	1	2	3	4	5	6	7	8	9	Points	Wins	Black	H2H	TPR
1	Magnus Carlsen (Norway)	2848		1	1	3	1	3	3	3	3	18				2991
2	Vladimir Kramnik (Russia)	2795	1		3	1	1	1	3	3	3	16				2939
3	Hikaru Nakamura (United States)	2760	1	0		1	1	3	3	3	1	13	3	2	1	2846
4	Michael Adams (England)	2710	0	1	1		3	1	3	1	3	13	3	2	1	2852
5	Viswanathan Anand (India)	2775	1	1	1	0		1	1	1	3	9				2749
6	Levon Aronian (Armenia)	2815	0	1	0	1	1		1	3	1	8				2701
7	Judit Polgár (Hungary)	2705	0	0	0	0	1	1		3	1	6				2617
8	Luke McShane (England)	2713	0	0	0	1	1	0	0		3	5				2564
9	Gawain Jones (England)	2644	0	0	1	0	0	1	1	0		3				2514

=== Subsidiary events ===
Other tournaments organised during the festival included the nine-round Women's Invitational competition and nine-round "FIDE Rated Open". WGM Deimantė Daulytė (2212) of Lithuania was the outright winner of the former with 7/9, while Armenian GM Hrant Melkumyan (2649) and Dutch GM Robin van Kampen (2570) shared victory in the Open with 7½/9.

== 2013 Classic: 7–15 December ==
The format of the 2013 London Chess Classic was a "Super 16 Rapid" tournament (25 minutes + 10 seconds per move). The sixteen players were split into four groups, with the top two from each group qualifying for the quarterfinal knockout stages.

Invitations were accepted by fourteen players and further places were allocated to whichever two players were leading the FIDE Open after round 4 on 10 December.

Scoring was 3 points for a win, 1 for a draw, 0 for a loss. The €150,000 purse was distributed in this way: 1st – €50,000; 2nd – €25,000; 3rd–4th – €12,500; 5th–8th – €6,250; 9th–16th – €3,125.

The participants of the Super 16 Rapid were banded according to their FIDE rapidplay rating, to create four pools of four players. Four preliminary groups were then constructed by randomly drawing one player from each pool, creating four groups of fairly equal standing. The draw was carried out on 4 December 2013 at Ravenscroft Primary School in Newham, with the assistance of the pupils.

=== Group stage ===
Group A, Category XIX (2720)
	Player	Rapid rating	1	2	3	4	Points	TPR	Place
1	Viswanathan Anand (India)	2773		1 1	3 3	3 1	12	2895	1–2
2	Michael Adams (England)	2754	1 1		1 3	3 3	12	2902	1–2
3	Luke McShane (England)	2684	0 0	1 0		3 0	4	2539	3–4
4	Andrei Istrățescu (France)	2670	0 1	0 0	0 3		4	2544	3–4

Group B, Category XVIII (2692)
	Player	Rapid rating	1	2	3	4	Points	TPR	Place
1	Peter Svidler (Russia)	2758		0 3	1 1	3 3	11	2794	1
2	Vladimir Kramnik (Russia)	2793	3 0		1 1	3 1	9	2714	2
3	Matthew Sadler (England)	2646	1 1	1 1		0 3	7	2706	3
4	Jonathan Rowson (Scotland)	2569	0 0	0 1	3 0		4	2539	4

Group C, Category XX (2728)
	Player	Rapid rating	1	2	3	4	Points	TPR	Place
1	Hikaru Nakamura (USA)	2786		1 1	1 3	3 1	10	2833	1
2	Boris Gelfand (Israel)	2777	1 1		3 0	3 1	9	2768	2
3	Gawain Jones (England)	2654	1 0	0 3		0 3	7	2695	3
4	Judit Polgár (Hungary)	2693	0 1	0 1	3 0		5	2614	4

Group D, Category XVIII (2691)
	Player	Rapid rating	1	2	3	4	Points	TPR	Place
1	Fabiano Caruana (Italy)	2782		3 3	1 3	3 3	16	3061	1
2	Nigel Short (England)	2683	0 0		1 3	3 3	10	2750	2
3	David Howell (England)	2640	1 0	1 0		3 0	5	2582	3
4	Emil Sutovsky (Israel)	2657	0 0	0 0	0 3		3	2428	4

=== Knockout stage ===
Quarterfinals
2B	Vladimir Kramnik (Russia)	1½
1A	Viswanathan Anand (India)	½
2D	Nigel Short (England)	½
1C	Hikaru Nakamura (United States)	1½
2A	Michael Adams (England)	3
1B	Peter Svidler (Russia)	1
1D	Fabiano Caruana (Italy)	1
2C	Boris Gelfand (Israel)	3

Semifinals
2B	Vladimir Kramnik (Russia)	½
1C	Hikaru Nakamura (United States)	1½
2A	Michael Adams (England)	½
2C	Boris Gelfand (Israel)	1½

Final
1C	Hikaru Nakamura (United States)	1½
2C	Boris Gelfand (Israel)	½

=== Subsidiary events ===
Other tournaments taking place during the festival included the double round robin Women's Invitational and nine-round FIDE Rated Open. IM Dagnė Čiukšytė (2345) of England was the outright winner of the former with 7½/10, while Norway's Jon Ludvig Hammer (2612) triumphed in the Open with 7½/9.

== 2014 Classic: 6–14 December ==
The tournament was once again organized and directed by IM Malcolm Pein. The world champion, Magnus Carlsen, declined his invitation due to the closeness of his world championship re-match with Viswanathan Anand. Anand indicated that he was able to play, no matter the outcome of his title match. The main tournament was a single round, all-play-all format, where the uneven colour split was decided in favour of the winners of the Elite Blitz contest (see 'Subsidiary events' below). Sofia Rules and football-style scoring (three points for a win and one for a draw) were used to discourage draws. Anand was declared winner of the Elite tournament on tie-break, due to scoring the only win with the black pieces. Guest appearances were made by former world champion Garry Kasparov, London Mayor Boris Johnson and Kenneth Rogoff, among others. Online commentators included Nigel Short, Danny King, Lawrence Trent, Chris Ward and David Howell. Analysis room commentary at the venue was provided by Julian Hodgson.

=== Tournament table ===
6th London Chess Classic, 10–14 December 2014, London, England, Category XXII (2780)
	Player	Rating	1	2	3	4	5	6	Points	Wins	Black	H2H	TPR
1	Viswanathan Anand (India)	2793		1	1	1	3	1	7	1	1		2849
2	Vladimir Kramnik (Russia)	2769	1		1	3	1	1	7	1	0	1	2854
3	Anish Giri (Netherlands)	2768	1	1		1	3	1	7	1	0	1	2854
4	Hikaru Nakamura (United States)	2775	1	0	1		3	1	6				2781
5	Michael Adams (England)	2745	0	1	0	0		3	4	1			2638
6	Fabiano Caruana (Italy)	2829	1	1	1	1	0		4	0			2698

=== Subsidiary events ===
With a shorter than usual main tournament, greater emphasis was placed on the additional festival events this year, with the elite players participating in the rapidplay and blitz tournaments. The Elite Blitz, like the main tournament, was scored using the 'three points for a win, one point for a draw' system. Adams was the winner, on tie-break from Nakamura and Kramnik. Other events were scored in the usual manner (one point for a win and a half-point for a draw). Grandmaster simultaneous displays were provided by David Howell and Vladislav Tkachiev. The Pro-Biz Cup event comprised 2-player teams (one professional chess player, partnered by a top business leader, taking alternate moves) in a knockout format.

Elite Blitz: Michael Adams, Hikaru Nakamura, Vladimir Kramnik 17/30, Anish Giri 16, Viswanathan Anand 10, Fabiano Caruana 9 (6 players, double round robin).

Super Rapidplay Open: Hikaru Nakamura 9½/10, Anish Giri 8½, Fabiano Caruana, Viswanathan Anand, Vladimir Kramnik, Nigel Short, Aleksandr Lenderman, Eric Hansen, Daniel Naroditsky, Nicholas Pert, Alon Greenfeld, Simon Williams 8 ... (405 players).

FIDE Open: Kamil Dragun, Bai Jinshi 7½/9, Vladislav Tkachiev, Bartosz Socko, Aleksandr Lenderman, Alexandr Fier, Alon Greenfeld, Jacek Stopa 7 ... (211 players).

Challenge Match: Gawain Jones defeated Romain Edouard by 4–2. Final game 6 was played at Heathfield School, Hampstead, on 15 December (otherwise held alongside the main tournament).

Pro-Biz Cup: Anish Giri and Rajko Vujatovic (Bank of America, Merrill Lynch) defeated Vladimir Kramnik and Russell Picot (HSBC) in the final.

== 2015 Classic: 4–13 December ==
In 2015, the London Chess Classic joined with Norway Chess and the Sinquefield Cup to form the Grand Chess Tour. Michael Adams was selected as the tournament wildcard and joins the other nine players already participating in the Grand Chess Tour.

=== Tournament table ===
7th London Chess Classic, 3–14 December 2015, London, England, Category XXII (2784)
	Player	Rating	1	2	3	4	5	6	7	8	9	10	Points	Wins	H2H	SB	TPR	Tour Points	Place
1	Magnus Carlsen (Norway)	2834		½	½	½	1	½	½	1	½	½	5½	2	1	24.00	2859	12	1
2	Anish Giri (Netherlands)	2784	½		½	½	½	½	½	1	½	1	5½	2	1	23.00	2864	10	2
3	Maxime Vachier-Lagrave (France)	2773	½	½		½	½	½	½	½	1	1	5½	2	1	22.75	2865	8	3
4	Levon Aronian (Armenia)	2788	½	½	½		½	½	½	½	½	1	5				2827	7	4
5	Alexander Grischuk (Russia)	2747	0	½	½	½		½	½	½	1	½	4½	1			2788	6	5
6	Fabiano Caruana (United States)	2787	½	½	½	½	½		½	½	½	½	4½	0	½	20.25	2784	4.5	6–7
7	Michael Adams (England)	2737	½	½	½	½	½	½		½	½	½	4½	0	½	20.25	2789	4.5	6–7
8	Hikaru Nakamura (United States)	2793	0	0	½	½	½	½	½		1	½	4				2740	3	8
9	Viswanathan Anand (India)	2796	½	½	0	½	0	½	½	0		1	3½				2703	2	9
10	Veselin Topalov (Bulgaria)	2803	½	0	0	0	½	½	½	½	0		2½				2616	1	10

==== First place play-off ====
Semifinal			Final
			1	Magnus Carlsen (Norway)	1½
2	Anish Giri (Netherlands)	1	3	Maxime Vachier-Lagrave (France)	½
3	Maxime Vachier-Lagrave (France)	2

=== Subsidiary events ===
British Knockout Championship: David Howell won by defeating Nicholas Pert in the final by a score of 4−2.

FIDE Open: Benjamin Bok 8/9, Evgeny Postny, Rinat Jumabayev, Eric Hansen, Jonathan Hawkins, Jahongir Vakhidov, Daniel Sadzikowski 7 ... (247 participants).

Super Rapidplay Open: Luke McShane 9.5/10, Hrant Melkumyan 8.5, Aleksandr Lenderman, Eric Hansen, Nicholas Pert, Romain Édouard, Jon Ludvig Hammer, Sergey Grigoriants, Rinat Jumabayev, David Eggleston, Tamas Fodor Jr. 8 ... (368 participants).

Pro-Biz Cup: Hikaru Nakamura and Josip Asik (CEO of Chess Informant) won.

== 2016 Classic: 9–18 December ==
All ratings listed below are from the December 2016 rating list.

=== Tournament table ===
8th London Chess Classic, 9–18 December 2016, London, England, Category XXII (2785)
	Player	Rating	1	2	3	4	5	6	7	8	9	10	Points	TPR	Tour Points	Place
1	Wesley So (United States)	2794		½	1	½	½	½	½	½	1	1	6	2909	13	1
2	Fabiano Caruana (United States)	2823	½		1	½	½	½	½	½	½	1	5½	2861	10	2
3	Hikaru Nakamura (United States)	2779	0	0		1	½	½	1	½	½	1	5	2829	7	3–5
4	Viswanathan Anand (India)	2779	½	½	0		½	½	1	½	½	1	5	2829	7	3–5
5	Vladimir Kramnik (Russia)	2809	½	½	½	½		½	½	½	½	1	5	2826	7	3–5
6	Anish Giri (Netherlands)	2771	½	½	½	½	½		½	½	½	½	4½	2787	5	6
7	Maxime Vachier-Lagrave (France)	2804	½	½	0	0	½	½		1	½	½	4	2740	3	7–9
8	Levon Aronian (Armenia)	2785	½	½	½	½	½	½	0		1	0	4	2742	3	7–9
9	Michael Adams (England)	2748	0	½	½	½	½	½	½	0		1	4	2746	3	7–9
10	Veselin Topalov (Bulgaria)	2760	0	0	0	0	0	½	½	1	0		2	2568	1	10

=== Subsidiary events ===
British Knockout Championship: Nigel Short beat David Howell 3½-2½ in the final.

FIDE Open: Étienne Bacrot (2689) and Sébastien Mazé (2608) shared first prize, scoring 7½/9.

Super-Rapidplay: Valentina Gunina (2491) won first place and the prize of £5,000 with a score of 9/10. Gunina was ranked 33rd at the start, and clobbered a strong field of grandmasters.

== 2017 Classic: 1–11 December ==
=== Tournament table ===
9th London Chess Classic, 1–11 December 2017, London, England, Category XXII (2779)
	Player	Rating	1	2	3	4	5	6	7	8	9	10	Points	TB	Wins	H2H	TPR	Tour Points	Place
1	Fabiano Caruana (United States)	2799		½	½	½	½	½	½	1	1	1	6	2½			2901	12	1
2	Ian Nepomniachtchi (Russia)	2729	½		1	½	½	½	½	½	1	1	6	1½			2909	10	2
3	Magnus Carlsen (Norway)	2837	½	0		½	½	½	1	½	½	1	5		2		2815	7	3
4	Maxime Vachier-Lagrave (France)	2789	½	½	½		½	½	½	1	½	½	5		1	½	2820	7	4–5
5	Wesley So (United States)	2788	½	½	½	½		½	½	½	1	½	5		1	½	2820	7	4–5
6	Hikaru Nakamura (United States)	2781	½	½	½	½	½		½	½	½	½	4½				2778	5	6
7	Levon Aronian (Armenia)	2805	½	½	0	½	½	½		½	½	½	4				2733	4	7
8	Sergey Karjakin (Russia)	2760	0	½	½	0	½	½	½		½	½	3½				2701	3	8
9	Viswanathan Anand (India)	2782	0	0	½	½	0	½	½	½		½	3		0	½	2653	1.5	9–10
10	Michael Adams (England)	2715	0	0	0	½	½	½	½	½	½		3		0	½	2661	1.5	9–10

- Final blitz tie-break: Fabiano Caruana def. Ian Nepomniachtchi, 2½–1½.

First place playoff
Place	Player	Rapid rating	Blitz rating	Rapid		Blitz		Score
1	Fabiano Caruana (USA)	2751	2804	½	½	½	1	2½
2	Ian Nepomniachtchi (RUS)	2780	2810	½	½	½	0	1½

=== Subsidiary events ===
British Knockout Championship: Luke McShane beat David Howell in the final by 6−8.

FIDE Open: Gabriel Sargissian, Hrant Melkumyan and Sébastien Mazé shared first place, scoring 7½/9.

== 2018 Classic: 11–17 December ==
In 2018, the London Chess Classic served as the semifinals and finals for the top 4 players from the 2018 Grand Chess Tour.

The players played 2 classical games, 2 rapid games, and 4 blitz games. 6 points were awarded for a win, 3 points for a draw and 0 points for a loss in classical play. In the Rapid games, 4 points were awarded for a win, 2 points for a draw, and 0 points for a loss. In the Blitz games, 2 points were awarded for a win, 1 point for a draw and 0 point for a loss.

After seven consecutive draws that opened his final match with Vachier-Lagrave, Nakamura clinched an event victory by defeating Vachier-Lagrave in the fourth and final blitz game.

Semifinals
1	Hikaru Nakamura (United States)	18
4	Fabiano Caruana (United States)	10
2	Levon Aronian (Armenia)	10
3	Maxime Vachier-Lagrave (France)	18

Finals
1	Hikaru Nakamura (United States)	15
3	Maxime Vachier-Lagrave (France)	13
Third place
4	Fabiano Caruana (United States)	16
2	Levon Aronian (Armenia)	12

=== Subsidiary events ===
British Knockout Championship: Gawain Jones beat Luke McShane in the final by 21−7.

FIDE Open: Jules Moussard and Nicholas Pert tied for first place with a score of 7½/9.

== 2019 Classic: 2–8 December ==
In 2019, the London Chess Classic once again served as the semifinals and finals for the top 4 players from the 2019 Grand Chess Tour.

The players played 2 classical games, 2 rapid games, and 4 blitz games. 6 points was awarded for a win, 3 points for a draw and 0 points for a loss in classical play. In the rapid games, 4 points was awarded for a win, 2 points for a draw, and 0 points for a loss. In the blitz games, 2 points was awarded for a win, 1 point for a draw and 0 points for a loss.

Vachier-Lagrave won the rapid playoff against Carlsen 1½–½ to advance to the final.

Semifinals
1	Magnus Carlsen (Norway)	14½
4	Maxime Vachier-Lagrave (France)	15½
2	Ding Liren (China)	19
3	Levon Aronian (Armenia)	9

Final
4	Maxime Vachier-Lagrave (France)	12
2	Ding Liren (China)	16
Third place
1	Magnus Carlsen (Norway)	17
3	Levon Aronian (Armenia)	11

=== Subsidiary events ===
Subsidiary events included:

British Knockout Championship - Won by Michael Adams, defeating David Howell in the final by 6-4.

FIDE Open - Jointly won by Praggnanandhaa R and Anton Smirnov, both scoring 7½/9.

No-castling Exhibition Match - Gawain Jones drew a match 1-1 with Luke McShane (2 decisive games). Promoted by former World Champion, Vladimir Kramnik, this newly publicized chess variant disallowed the castling move, in order to encourage attacking play against a more vulnerable King.

== 2021 Classic: 3–12 December ==
During the COVID-19 pandemic, with the international calendar being busy with the Candidates Tournament and the FIDE Online Chess Olympiad, there was no London Chess Classic 2020. In 2021, the Chess Classic returned, but was not part of the Grand Chess Tour 2021. Taking place while the World Chess Championship was happening in Dubai, it was held in the Cavendish Conference Centre in London, and featured a match between England and the Rest of the World.

The England team comprised Michael Adams, Luke McShane and Gawain Jones. Invited grandmasters Boris Gelfand, Nikita Vitiugov and Maxime Lagarde represented a Rest of the World team. After 6 rounds, the Rest of the World team won with 9½ points against England's 8½ points.

=== Subsidiary events ===
Subsidiary events included:

Pro-Biz Cup - Won by Michael Adams and Kameron Grose with 3/3.

12th British Rapidplay - Luke McShane, Gawain Jones 7/9, Jon Speelman, Michael Adams 5½, Ameet Ghasi 5 etc. (10 players). Jones won the playoff for first place, by a score of 2-0.

== 2023 Classic: 1–10 December ==
In 2023, the London Chess Classic returned, but was again not part of the Grand Chess Tour. The event was won by English grandmaster Michael Adams. IM Shreyas Royal earned his second Grandmaster norm.

=== Tournament table ===
13th London Chess Classic, 1–10 December 2023, London, England
	Player	Rating	1	2	3	4	5	6	7	8	9	10	Points	H2H	TPR	Circuit
1	GM Michael Adams (ENG)	2661		1	½	½	1	½	½	1	½	½	6		2770	17.46
2	GM Amin Tabatabaei (IRI)	2692	0		½	1	1	½	0	½	1	1	5½		2722	13.97
3	GM Gukesh D (IND)	2720	½	½		1	1	0	½	0	½	1	5	1	2681	11.35
4	GM Andrei Volokitin (UKR)	2659	½	0	0		1	1	1	½	½	½	5	0	2688	11.35
5	GM Mateusz Bartel (POL)	2659	0	0	0	0		1	1	1	½	1	4½	1	2645	4.37
6	GM Hans Niemann (USA)	2667	½	½	1	0	0		1	½	½	½	4½	0	2644	4.37
7	IM Shreyas Royal (ENG)	2438	½	1	½	0	0	0		1	½	½	4	1	2627	
8	GM Jules Moussard (FRA)	2635	0	½	1	½	0	½	0		1	½	4	0	2605	
9	GM Nikita Vitiugov (ENG)	2704	½	0	½	½	½	½	½	0		½	3½		2560	
10	GM Luke McShane (ENG)	2631	½	0	0	½	0	½	½	½	½		3		2523	

=== Subsidiary events ===
Pro-Biz Cup: Won by Gawain Jones and Colm O'Shea (Founder & CIO of COMAC Capital LLP).

== 2024 Classic: 29 November – 6 December ==
In 2024, the London Chess Classic was again not part of the Grand Chess Tour, and the player count was reduced from ten to eight. The event was won by English grandmaster Gawain Jones.

=== Tournament table ===
14th London Chess Classic, 29 November–6 December 2024, London, England
	Player	Rating	1	2	3	4	5	6	7	8	Points	H2H	TPR	Circuit
1	Gawain Jones (ENG)	2639		1	½	½	½	½	1	1	5		2795	15.14
2	Michael Adams (ENG)	2662	0		½	½	1	½	½	1	4	2	2684	5.16
3	Nikita Vitiugov (ENG)	2668	½	½		½	½	0	1	1	4	1½	2683	5.16
4	Vidit Gujrathi (IND)	2739	½	½	½		½	1	½	½	4	1½	2673	5.16
5	Shakhriyar Mamedyarov (AZE)	2738	½	0	½	½		½	1	1	4	1	2673	5.16
6	Andrew Hong (USA)	2572	½	½	1	0	½		½	½	3½		2647	
7	Ju Wenjun (CHN)	2563	0	½	0	½	0	½		1	2½		2546	
8	Shreyas Royal (ENG)	2520	0	0	0	½	0	½	0		1		2345	

=== Subsidiary events ===
FIDE Open: Raunak Sadhwani and Ilya Smirin tied for first place with a score of 7/9... (87 participants).

Pro-Biz Cup: Won by Michael Adams and Neil Dickenson.

Super Blitz: Alireza Firouzja 5.5, Maxime Vachier-Lagrave 4.5, Gawain Jones, Vidit Gujrathi 4 ... (32 players, round robin).

== 2025 Classic: 26 November – 5 December ==
In 2025, the London Chess Classic had increased the player count back from eight to ten. It was part of the 2025 FIDE Circuit. The event was won by Uzbek grandmaster Nodirbek Abdusattorov who had performance rating of 2932.

=== Tournament table ===
15th London Chess Classic, 26 November–5 December 2025, London, England
	Player	Rating	1	2	3	4	5	6	7	8	9	10	Points	H2H	TPR	Circuit
1	Nodirbek Abdusattorov (UZB)	2750		½	1	1	1	1	½	½	1	1	7½		2932	19.62
2	Alireza Firouzja (FRA)	2762	½		½	1	½	½	1	½	½	½	5½		2737	14.27
3	Nikita Vitiugov (ENG)	2657	0	½		½	½	½	1	½	½	1	5		2712	12.49
4	Luke McShane (ENG)	2615	0	0	½		½	1	½	1	½	½	4½	½	2674	
5	Michael Adams (ENG)	2635	0	½	½	½		½	½	½	½	1	4½	½	2671	
6	Nikolas Theodorou (GRE)	2656	0	½	½	0	½		½	1	½	½	4	½	2626	
7	Pavel Eljanov (UKR)	2656	½	0	0	½	½	½		1	½	½	4	½	2626	
8	Gawain Jones (ENG)	2655	½	½	½	0	½	0	0		1	½	3½	1	2589	
9	Abhimanyu Mishra (USA)	2642	0	½	½	½	½	½	½	0		½	3½	0	2591	
10	Sam Shankland (USA)	2649	0	½	0	½	0	½	½	½	½		3		2545	

=== Subsidiary events ===
FIDE Open: R Praggnanandhaa, Velimir Ivić and Ameet Ghasi tied for first place with a score of 7/9... (120 participants).

Pro-Biz Cup: Won by Abhimanyu Mishra and Bodhana Sivanandan.

Super Rapidplay Open: Nikolas Theodorou 9, Alireza Firouzja 8.5, Leinier Domínguez, Michael Adams, Nikita Vitiugov, Pavel Eljanov, IM Eitan Rozen, Pranav Anand 8 ... (320 participants).

== 2026 Classic: 25 November – 4 December ==
In 2026, the London Chess Classic has 2 invitational sections, Masters and Challengers, with 10 players each. Nodirbek Abdusattorov is the defending champion. It would be part of the 2026–2027 FIDE Circuit.

=== Masters ===
All players in the Masters section are grandmasters.

16th London Chess Classic Masters, 25 November–4 December 2026, London, England
	Player	Rating	1	2	3	4	5	6	7	8	9	10	Points	H2H	TPR	Circuit
1	Nodirbek Abdusattorov (UZB)	2772														
2	Nihal Sarin (IND)	2720														
3	Levon Aronian (USA)	2719														
4	Andy Woodward (USA)	2635														
5	Vasyl Ivanchuk (UKR)	2635														
6	Gawain Jones (ENG)	2630														
7	Ihor Samunenkov (UKR)	2610														
8	Luke McShane (ENG)	2606														
9	Michael Adams (ENG)	2597														
10	Shreyas Royal (ENG)	2537														

=== Challengers ===
1st London Chess Classic Challengers, 25 November–4 December 2026, London, England
	Player	Rating	1	2	3	4	5	6	7	8	9	10	Points	H2H	TPR
1	GM Loek van Wely (NED)	2626													
2	GM Rinat Jumabayev (KAZ)	2574													
3	GM Mateusz Bartel (POL)	2551													
4	GM Daniel Fernandez (ENG)	2526													
5	GM Eytan Rozen (ISR)	2512													
6	GM Roman Dehtiarov (UKR)	2502													
7	GM Harry Grieve (ENG)	2489													
8	IM Carissa Yip (USA)	2453													
9	GM Harika Dronavalli (IND)	2444													
10	IM Supratit Banerjee (ENG)	2413													

=== Subsidiary events ===
FIDE Open: TBD

Pro-Biz Cup: TBD

Super Rapidplay Open: TBD
