= EU Individual Open Chess Championship =

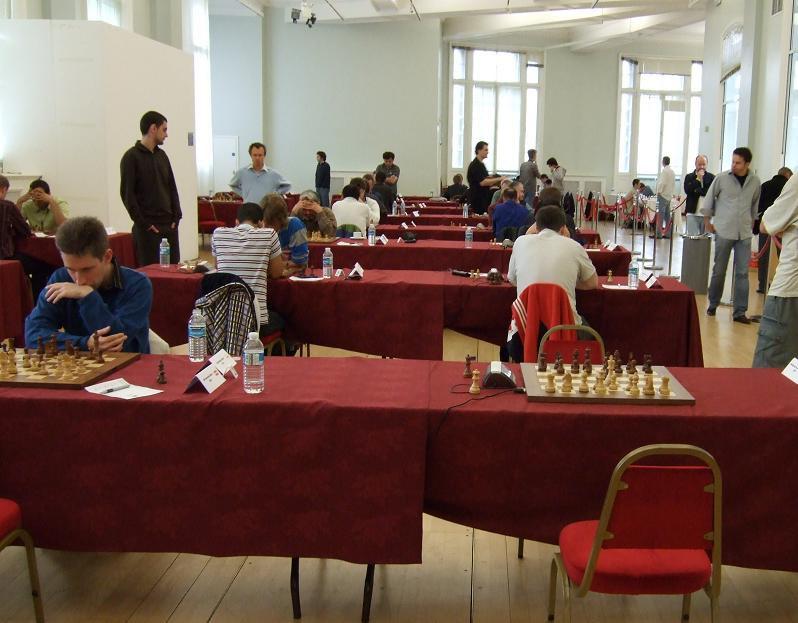
Tournament hall at Liverpool's World Museum, 2008

The EU Individual Open Championship was first contested in Cork, Ireland in 2005, under the auspices of organising body, the European Chess Union (ECU). The event is open to members of chess federations within the European Union. Exceptionally, at the discretion of the organisers, guest players have also been allowed to compete; for example, when the host nation has non-EU neighbours.

The fifth championship, held in Arvier in 2010, was its last edition.

== Background ==
The tournament has been held annually between 2005 and 2008, and again in 2010, sometimes in conjunction with the celebrations of cities awarded European Capital of Culture status. Financial backing has not been consistently high, but in the case of Liverpool 2008, the prize fund totalled £30,000, which was large enough to attract many of the EU's strongest players.

The events were run on an inclusive format, open to a range of players of varying standard, typically from Elo 1600 to 2700 or more, but unrated players are also eligible to play. Substantial prize money is awarded not just to the overall top finishers, but also to the highest finishing women and junior players. Additional prizes go to those showing the best rating improvement over the course of the tournament.

The time limits for play tended not to follow the FIDE format, but more closely resemble classical time limits, to give some assistance to players in the endgame phase.

== Results ==
=== 1st EU Individual Open, Cork 2005 ===
The first European Union Individual Open Championship formed part of the programme of events celebrating Cork City's status as European Capital of Culture for 2005. Played over ten rounds, the event took place 21 March – 3 April 2005 in the Ballroom Suite of the Gresham Metropole Hotel, MacCurtain Street, Cork, Ireland. There were one hundred and fifteen participants and Hungarian grandmaster Zoltan Gyimesi won the event on tie-break from Mateusz Bartel of Poland, who drew level on points in the final round. The highest placed woman player was IM Viktorija Čmilytė of Lithuania with 6½ points.

Place	Player	Title	Rating	Nationality	Result
1–2	Zoltan Gyimesi	GM	2602	Hungary	8½/10
	Mateusz Bartel	GM	2487	Poland	8½/10
3–5	Bartosz Soćko	GM	2591	Poland	7½/10
	Roland Berzinsh	IM	2454	Latvia	7½/10
	Mark Hebden	GM	2521	England	7½/10
6–9	Slavko Cicak	GM	2552	Sweden	7/10
	Joel Benjamin	GM	2554	United States	7/10
	Normunds Miezis	GM	2547	Latvia	7/10
	Alexander Baburin	GM	2523	Ireland	7/10

=== 2nd EU Individual Open, Liverpool 2006 ===
The second edition of the Championship took place at the World Museum, William Brown Street, Liverpool, England. Held 6–15 September 2006, the tournament entry totalled eighty-four. Going into the final round, host nation grandmaster Nigel Short was the only leading player to win, defeating Mark Hebden to capture clear first place with 7½/10. The highest placed woman player was IM Dagnė Čiukšytė of Lithuania on 6½ points, repeating the achievement of compatriot Cmilyte, in the previous year's event.

Place	Player	Title	Rating	Nationality	Result
1	Nigel Short	GM	2676	England	7½/10
2–9	Šarūnas Šulskis	GM	2514	Lithuania	7/10
	Luke McShane	GM	2614	England	7/10
	Stephen Gordon	IM	2443	England	7/10
	Gawain Jones	IM	2416	England	7/10
	Luis Galego	GM	2528	Portugal	7/10
	Danny Gormally	GM	2513	England	7/10
	Klaus Bischoff	GM	2533	Germany	7/10
	Karel van der Weide	GM	2446	Netherlands	7/10

=== 3rd EU Individual Open, Arvier 2007 ===
The third European Union Individual Open Championship took place June 15-24th 2007, in Arvier (Aosta Valley), Italy. There were one hundred and ten competitors and the tournament was open to the players of the twenty-seven countries of the European Union, plus four additional countries close to the host nation, these being Croatia, Montenegro, Serbia and Turkey. Serbian Nikola Sedlak took the contest on tie-break from local favourite Michele Godena, after both finished on 8/10. Godena was however awarded the Champion's title, due to Sedlak being a non-EU citizen. IM Cristina Foișor (ROM) was the top finishing woman player with 6½ points.

Place	Player	Title	Rating	Nationality	Result
1–2	Nikola Sedlak	GM	2575	Serbia	8/10
	Michele Godena	GM	2558	Italy	8/10
3–6	Thomas Luther	GM	2586	Germany	7½/10
	Fabiano Caruana	IM	2513	Italy	7½/10
	Alexander Baburin	GM	2545	Ireland	7½/10
	Mišo Cebalo	GM	2491	Croatia	7½/10
7–9	Šarūnas Šulskis	GM	2533	Lithuania	7/10
	Nenad Sulava	GM	2549	Croatia	7/10
	Marcos Llaneza Vega	IM	2455	Spain	7/10

=== 4th EU Individual Open, Liverpool 2008 ===
The fourth edition of the Championship saw a return to the venue of 2006—Liverpool's World Museum. Held September 9-18th 2008, during the city's reign as European Capital of Culture, there were one hundred and forty participants, from twenty member states, competing for a record prize fund. The event was won by Jan Werle of the Netherlands, the best tournament success of his chess career to date. He drew with Maxime Vachier-Lagrave in the final round, while Michael Adams, a half point behind, settled for an early draw with Emanuel Berg, thereby securing a share of second place. The women's top spot was shared between Jovanka Houska, Yelena Dembo and Ketevan Arakhamia-Grant, all on 6 points.

Place	Player	Title	Rating	Nationality	Result
1	Jan Werle	GM	2591	Netherlands	8/10
2–4	Viktor Láznička	GM	2601	Czech Republic	7½/10
	Michael Adams	GM	2735	England	7½/10
	Nigel Short	GM	2655	England	7½/10
5–15	Alberto David	GM	2568	Luxembourg	7/10
	Erwin L'Ami	GM	2610	Netherlands	7/10
	Maxime Vachier-Lagrave	GM	2681	France	7/10
	Daniel Fridman	GM	2637	Germany	7/10
	Emanuel Berg	GM	2592	Sweden	7/10
	Étienne Bacrot	GM	2691	France	7/10
	David Howell	GM	2561	England	7/10
	Sergei Tiviakov	GM	2645	Netherlands	7/10
	Thomas Luther	GM	2570	Germany	7/10
	Jan Smeets	GM	2593	Netherlands	7/10
	Alexander Beliavsky	GM	2606	Slovenia	7/10

=== 5th EU Individual Open, Arvier 2010 ===
The fifth edition of the championship took place 4–12 September in Arvier, Italy. There were forty-seven participants. Polish Grandmaster Pawel Jaracz took the title on tiebreak from other five players scoring 6½ points in 9 rounds, and Woman Grandmaster Monica Calzetta Ruiz from Spain was the top finishing woman with 5½ points.

Place	Player	Title	Rating	Nationality	Result
1–6	Pawel Jaracz	GM	2543	Poland	6½/9
	Sabino Brunello	IM	2497	Italy	6½/9
	Evgenij Agrest	GM	2585	Sweden	6½/9
	Lexy Ortega	GM	2473	Italy	6½/9
	Miguel Llanes Hurtado	GM	2474	Spain	6½/9
	Clovis Vernay	IM	2460	France	6½/9
7–9	Sergio Estremera Panos	IM	2337	Spain	6/9
	Mihai Șubă	GM	2464	Romania	6/9
	Mauro Barletta	CM	2211	Italy	6/9

== See also ==
- European Individual Chess Championship
