= Tomáš Oral =

Czech chess player

Personal information
- Born: 24 December 1977 (age 48)

Chess career
- Country: Czech Republic
- Title: Grandmaster (1999)
- FIDE rating: 2489 (July 2026)
- Peak rating: 2565 (July 2004)

Tomáš Oral (born 24 December 1977) is a chess Grandmaster from the Czech Republic.

== Career ==
Oral started playing chess aged five when his father taught him the rules. Oral won the European under-14 championships in 1991 and was fifth at the under-20 world championships. He became Grandmaster in 1999.

He participated twice in the European Team Chess Championships, playing on top board in 2001 and finishing with 3½ points from 8 games. He played four Chess Olympiads in a row (between 1998 and 2004), recording the best individual results in 2002 with 6½ points from 10 games. He won several international tournaments.

In 2001, during a simul game between Garry Kasparov and four Czech national team members, Oral was the only Czech to beat the world champion.

In the recent years, he has reduced his chess activities.

== Personal life ==
Oral is married to Portuguese woman international master and national champion Catarina Leite Oralová.
