= Rúben Pereira =

Rúben Pereira may refer to:

- Rúben Pereira (chess player) (born 1991), Portuguese chess player
- Rúben Pereira (footballer) (born 1998), Portuguese footballer

== See also ==
- Ruben Pereira (born 1968), Uruguayan footballer
- Rubens Pereira Júnior (born 1984), Brazilian politician
