= Michele Godena =

Italian chess grandmaster (born 1967)

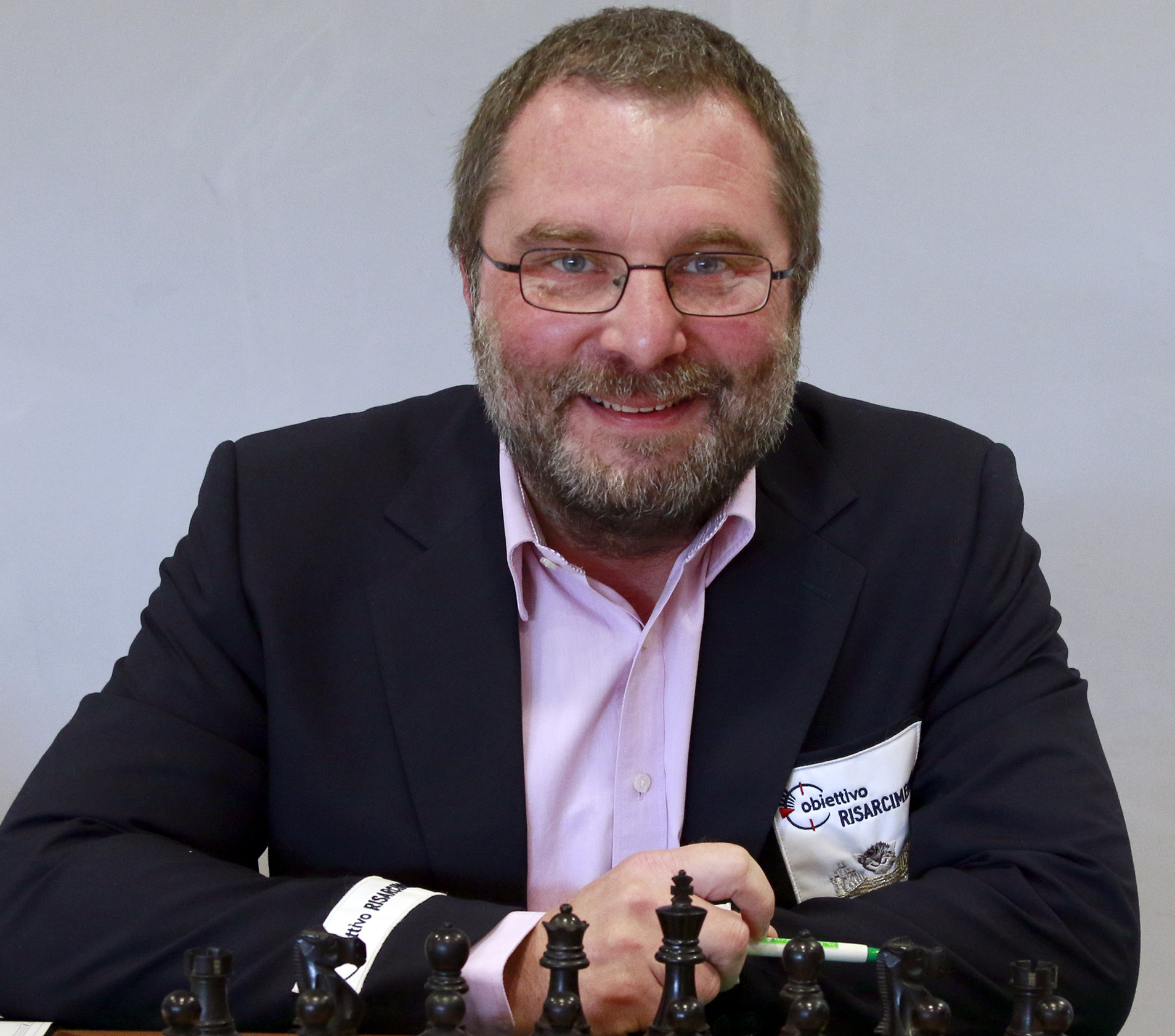
- Godena in 2015

Personal information
- Born: 30 June 1967 (age 59) Valdobbiadene, Italy

Chess career
- Country: Italy
- Title: Grandmaster (1996)
- FIDE rating: 2446 (July 2026)
- Peak rating: 2561 (March 2010)

Michele Godena (born 30 June 1967) is an Italian chess player. He achieved the FIDE titles of International Master (IM) in 1988 and Grandmaster (GM) in 1996, following a plus score on board one for Italy at the Chess Olympiad in Yerevan. Godena is a five-time Italian champion.

== Career ==
Godena has won five times the Italian Chess Championship, in 1992, 1993, 1995, 2005 and 2006. He was runner-up in 1990 and 1998. His 2006 victory was closely contested with the then 14-year-old Italian-American prodigy, International Master Fabiano Caruana. Both players finished the contest on 8 points from 11 rounds and Godena triumphed narrowly in the rapid and blitz play-off.

He tied for 1st–4th with Andrei Sokolov, Dražen Sermek and Xie Jun at Cannes 1997. At the Aeroflot Open 2006 in Moscow, Godena tied for 1st–12th in the A2 group, finishing 12th on tiebreak with a rating performance of 2628.

In June 2007, in Arvier, Godena became the champion of the European Union having tied for 1st–2nd with Serbian Nikola Sedlak, who won the tournament on tie-break, but as a non-European Union citizen, could not be awarded the title. In 2016, Godena won the 4th Francophonie Championship in Menton, France edging out Bassem Amin, Pablo Almagro Llamas and Yannick Gozzoli on tiebreak score. He has played many times for his country's Olympiad team and at Elista in 1998 posted a score of 66.7% playing board two.

For many years Italy's strongest player, he recorded his highest ever Elo rating of 2561 in March 2010.

== Playing style ==
While Godena was once nicknamed "The Italian Machine" by Sergei Shipov, other commentators believe that his disproportionate time management might be holding back his further progress. He frequently uses all of his time in the opening and early middle game, relying on positional knowledge, quickfire technique and instinctive reactions to make the remaining moves in incrementally added time.

As white, he opens with 1.e4 and as black, prefers the Ruy Lopez and Slav/Semi-Slav variations of the Queen's Gambit Declined.

== Personal life ==
Born in Valdobbiadene, Godena lives in Finale Ligure.

== Publications ==
- Godena, Michele (2007). La mia siciliana (in Italian). Caissa Italia. ISBN 9788888756561.
- Codenotti, Bruno; Godena, Michele (2019). A scuola di scacchi da Alice – Intrecci tra scacchi, matematica e letteratura (in Italian). Hoepli. ISBN 9788820391577.
