= Paulo Dias =

Paulo Dias may refer to:

- Paulo Dias de Novais (1510–1589), nobleman of the Royal Household and Portuguese colonizer of Africa
- Paulo Dias (footballer) (born 1944), retired professional Brazilian football (soccer) goalkeeper
- Paulo Dias (chess player) (born 1979), Portuguese chess player
