= Catarina Leite =

Portuguese chess player (born 1983)

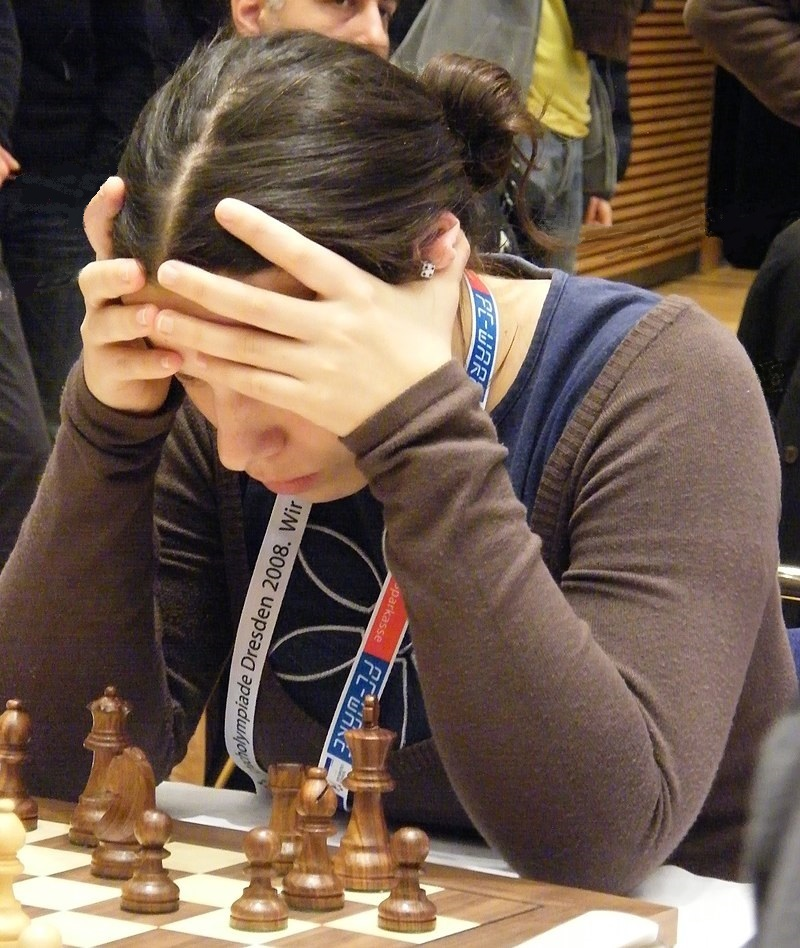

Personal information
- Born: January 20, 1983 (age 43)

Chess career
- Country: Portugal
- Title: Woman International Master (2001)
- Peak rating: 2237 (October 2006)

Catarina Leite Oralová (born January 20, 1983) is a Portuguese chess player. She is titled woman international master (2001).

Eight times national champion (from 1999 to 2006), she participated in the Chess Olympiad in Istanbul 2000, Calvià 2004, Turin 2006 and Dresden 2008.

She won the Women Cuca International Tournament in 2012 with a score of 8.5/9

Her best rating was 2237 in October 2006.

She is married to the Czech GM Tomáš Oral.
