= André Ventura Sousa =

Portuguese chess player (born 2000)

Personal information
- Born: 14 April 2000 (age 26) Porto, Portugal

Chess career
- Country: Portugal
- Title: International Master (2017)
- FIDE rating: 2426 (November 2026)
- Peak rating: 2472 (May 2023)

André Miguel do Vale Ventura de Sousa (born April 14, 2000) is a Portuguese chess International Master (2017), five-time Portuguese Chess Championship winner (2017, 2019, 2020, 2021, 2022).

== Chess career ==
Sousa is a five-time Portuguese Chess Championship winner: 2017, 2019, 2020, 2021, and 2022.

In 2021, in Sochi Sousa participated in single-elimination Chess World Cup and in 1st round lost to Russian Grandmaster Pavel Ponkratov.

Sousa played for Portugal in the Chess Olympiads:

- In 2016, at reserve board in the 42nd Chess Olympiad in Baku (+4, =1, -3),
- In 2018, at reserve board in the 43rd Chess Olympiad in Batumi (+5, =2, -3).
- In 2022, at third board in the 44th Chess Olympiad in Chennai (+5, =3, -2).

In 2017, he was awarded the FIDE International Master (IM) title.
