= João Mário Ribeiro =

Portuguese chess player (1929–2021)

Personal information
- Born: 10 June 1929
- Died: 21 September 2021 (aged 92)

Chess career
- Country: Portugal

João Mário Ribeiro (10 June 1929 – 21 September 2021) was a Portuguese chess player, three-time Portuguese Chess Championships winner (1954, 1963, 1971).

== Biography ==
From the mid-1950s to the mid-1970s João Mário Ribeiro was one of Portugal's leading chess players. He three times won Portuguese Chess Championships: 1954, 1963, and 1971. In 1954, in Munich João Mário Ribeiro participated in World Chess Championship Zonal tournament.

João Mário Ribeiro played for Portugal in the Chess Olympiads:

- In 1958, at third board in the 13th Chess Olympiad in Munich (+5, =7, -4),
- In 1960, at second board in the 14th Chess Olympiad in Leipzig (+7, =5, -5),
- In 1964, at first board in the 16th Chess Olympiad in Tel Aviv (+4, =5, -4),
- In 1966, at fourth board in the 17th Chess Olympiad in Havana (+3, =8, -4),
- In 1970, at fourth board in the 19th Chess Olympiad in Siegen (+4, =6, -5),
- In 1972, at first board in the 20th Chess Olympiad in Skopje (+3, =11, -6),
- In 1974, at fourth board in the 21st Chess Olympiad in Nice (+1, =4, -4).

Ribeiro died on 21 September 2021, at the age of 92.
