= Ana Filipa Baptista =

Portuguese chess player (born 1990)

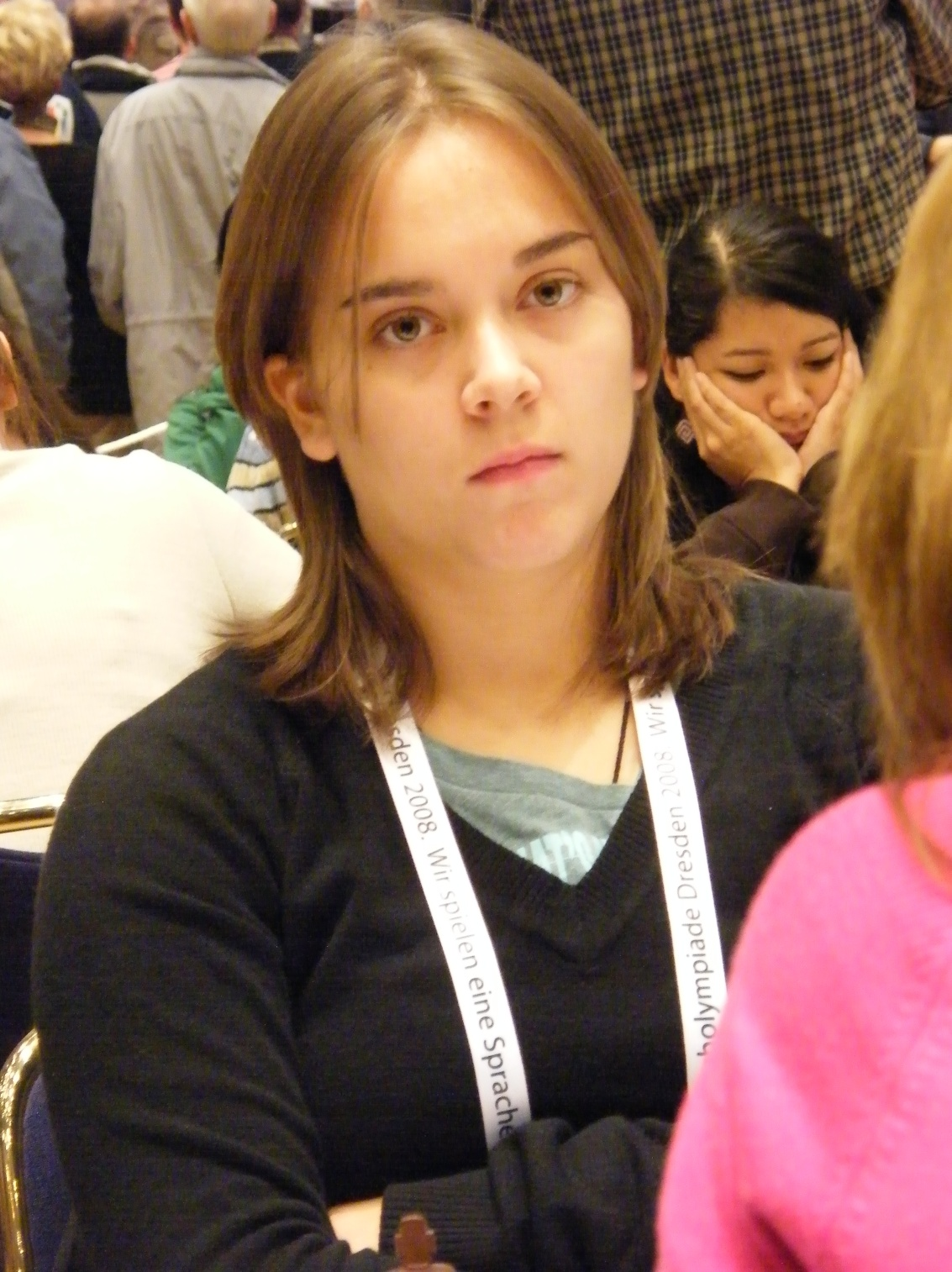
- At the 38th Chess Olympiad, Dresden, 2008

Personal information
- Born: 24 January 1990 (age 36)

Chess career
- Country: Portugal
- Title: Woman FIDE Master (2007)
- FIDE rating: 2008 (June 2019)
- Peak rating: 2180 (July 2009)

Ana Filipa Baptista (born 24 January 1990) is a Portuguese chess player who holds the title of Woman FIDE Master (WFM, 2007). She is a three-time winner the Portuguese Women Chess Championship (2008, 2009, 2015).

== Chess career ==
In 2003, in Graz, she won the European Communities Girls' Chess Championship in the U14 age group.

In Portuguese women's chess championships Baptista won three gold (2007/08, 2008/09, 2015/16), and three bronze (2000/01, 2001/02, 2006/07) medals.

Baptista played for Portugal in the Women's Chess Olympiads:

- In 2004, at first reserve board in the 36th Chess Olympiad (women) in Calvià (+4, =2, -3),
- In 2006, at first reserve board in the 37th Chess Olympiad (women) in Turin (+3, =4, -2),
- In 2008, at third board in the 38th Chess Olympiad (women) in Dresden (+7, =2, -2),
- In 2012, at third board in the 40th Chess Olympiad (women) in Istanbul (+4, =0, -4),
- In 2016, at first board in the 42nd Chess Olympiad (women) in Baku (+3, =1, -4).
