= Daniel De Oliveira (chess player) =

Portuguese chess player

Daniel Pereira de Oliveira
Personal information
- Born: 20 June 1931 (age 95)

Chess career
- Country: Portugal

Daniel de Oliveira (born 20 June 1931) is a Portuguese chess player, Portuguese Chess Championship winner (1953).

== Biography ==
In the 1950s and 1960s Daniel de Oliveira was one of Portugal's leading chess players. He won Portuguese Chess Championship in 1953.

Daniel De Oliveira played for Portugal in the Chess Olympiad:

- In 1960, at fourth board in the 14th Chess Olympiad in Leipzig (+7, =6, -4).
