= João Maria Cordovil =

Portuguese chess player (born 1946)

Personal information
- Born: 23 April 1946 (age 80)

Chess career
- Country: Portugal
- Title: FIDE Master (1984)
- Peak rating: 2340 (July 1990)

João Maria Cordovil (born 23 April 1946) is a Portuguese chess FIDE master (FM), International Correspondence Chess Master (IM), and three-time Portuguese Chess Championship winner (1966, 1967, 1969).

== Biography ==
In the 1960s and 1970s, João Maria Cordovil was one of Portugal's leading chess players. He won the Portuguese Chess Championship three times, in 1966, 1967, and 1969. Cordovil participated twice in the World Junior Chess Championship (1963, 1965) and once in the World Chess Championship Zonal tournament (1969).

Cordovil played for Portugal in the Chess Olympiad:

- In 1964, at second reserve board in the 16th Chess Olympiad in Tel Aviv (+0, =0, -3),
- In 1966, at third board in the 17th Chess Olympiad in Havana (+4, =5, -7),
- In 1968, at first board in the 18th Chess Olympiad in Lugano (+3, =7, -8),
- In 1970, at first board in the 19th Chess Olympiad in Siegen (+7, =3, -8),
- In 1974, at third board in the 21st Chess Olympiad in Nice (+7, =1, -9),
- In 1984, at second reserve board in the 26th Chess Olympiad in Thessaloniki (+3, =2, -1).

He also played for Portugal in the European Team Chess Championship:

- In 1989, at second reserve board in the 9th European Team Chess Championship in Haifa (+0, =0, -1).

In later years, Cordovil participated in correspondence chess tournaments. He participated in 14th World Correspondence Chess Championship (1994-2000). In 1991, João Maria Cordovil was awarded the ICCF International Correspondence Chess Master (IM) title.
