= Fernando Silva (chess player) =

Portuguese chess player (born 1950)

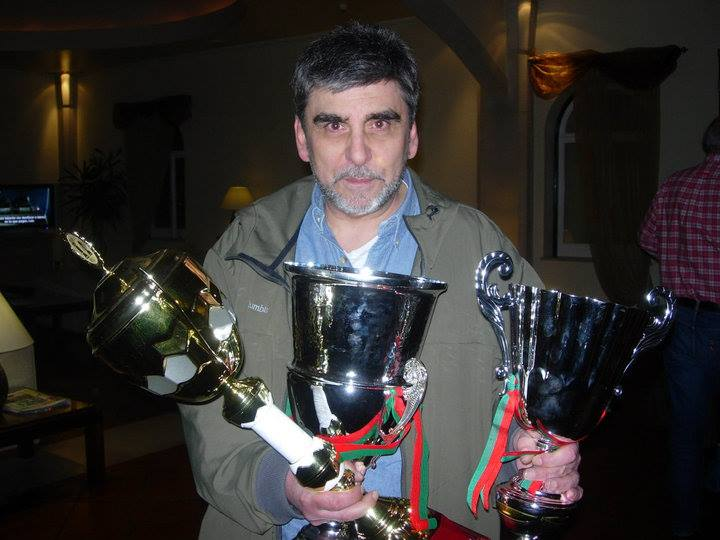

Personal information
- Born: Fernando Ribeiro da Silva; 4 August 1950 (age 75)

Chess career
- Country: Portugal
- Title: International Master (1975)
- Peak rating: 2385 (July 1994)

Fernando Ribeiro da Silva (born 4 August 1950) is a Portuguese chess champion who earned the title of International Master in 1975. Silva won the Portuguese Chess Championship in 1975, 1976, 1977, 1981 and 1987.
