= Sue Maroroa =

New Zealand-English chess player (1991–2023)

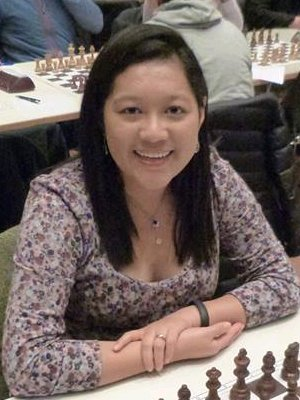
- Maroroa in 2013

Personal information
- Born: Sue Yuchan Maroroa; 4 March 1991 Auckland, New Zealand
- Died: 11 May 2023 (aged 32) Sheffield, South Yorkshire, England
- Spouse: Gawain Jones (m. 2012)

Chess career
- Country: New Zealand (until 2012); England (after 2012)
- Title: Woman International Master (2009)
- Peak rating: 2168 (May 2019)

Sue Yuchan Maroroa Jones (4 March 1991 – 11 May 2023) was a New Zealand-English chess player who held the FIDE title of Woman International Master (WIM). She represented New Zealand in five Chess Olympiads and England at the 2014 Chess Olympiad.

== Career ==
Maroroa started playing chess when she was 10 years old. She played at the Auckland Chess Club and was taught by local player Ian McNally. She later went on to play at the Papatoetoe and Howick-Pakuranga chess clubs as well.

At the age of 11, she represented New Zealand at the 35th Chess Olympiad in Bled, Slovenia, in 2002, and then at the World Youth Chess Championship Under-14 girls division in Belfort, France, in 2005, and Under-18 girls division in Vũng Tàu, Vietnam, in 2008.

In 2006, she won the New Zealand Women's Chess Championship. In 2008, she became the first female player to win the New Zealand Junior Chess Championship, coming equal first to share the title with Mario Krstev and Andy Chen.

Maroroa was awarded the title of Woman Candidate Master (WCM) in 2005 for her result of 5/9 at the 34th Chess Olympiad in Calvià, Spain in 2004. In 2007, she was awarded the title of Woman FIDE Master (WFM) for her result of 6/9 at the 2007 Oceania Women's Zonal Chess Championship in Fiji. Her third-place finish, again scoring 6/9, at the 2009 Oceania Women's Zonal Chess Championship on the Gold Coast, Queensland earned her the Woman International Master (WIM) title. During this time Maroroa was playing club chess in London, and was for a number of years the strongest player at Hammersmith Chess Club in West London.

Maroroa represented New Zealand in the five Chess Olympiads from 2002 to 2012. Her best result was in 2010 when she scored 6/9, without loss, in the 39th Chess Olympiad in Khanty-Mansiysk, Russia.

Maroroa competed in the Oceania Women's Championships in Auckland 2005, Denarau 2007, Gold Coast 2009, and Queenstown 2012.

In October 2012, she transferred chess federations to represent England. In 2014, she achieved an International Master norm in the Four Nations Chess League. Her performance included a win against Grandmaster Mark Hebden.

== Personal life and death ==
Sue Yuchan Maroroa was born in Auckland, New Zealand, to a Cook Islander father and a Chinese-Malaysian mother. Since 2010, Maroroa had been living in the United Kingdom. In June 2012, she married leading British Grandmaster Gawain Jones. She lived in Sheffield and played rugby for Sheffield Ladies RUFC.

On 11 May 2023, Maroroa died at the age of 32 from complications following the birth of her second child. The 2023 edition of the New Zealand Women's Chess Championship was named the Sue Maroroa-Jones Memorial in tribute.

== Notable games ==
Maroroa vs. Franklin, Ascot 2010

Position: c8 black rook, b7 white rook, e7 black king, h7 black pawn, e6 black bishop, b5 white bishop, f5 black pawn, c3 white pawn, b2 white pawn, g2 white pawn, h2 white pawn, g1 white king

Final position
- Sue Maroroa – Samuel Franklin, Sunningdale Open (2010), Sicilian Defence: Closed Variation (B23), 1-0

1. e4 c5 2. Nc3 g6 3. f4 Bg7 4. Nf3 Nc6 5. Bb5 Nd4 6. O-O Nh6 7. d3 O-O 8. f5 gxf5 9. Nxd4 cxd4 10. Nd5 e6 11. Qh5 exd5 12. Bxh6 Bxh6 13. Qxh6 Qb6 14. Qxb6 axb6 15. Rxf5 dxe4 16. dxe4 d6 17. Rd5 f5 18. Rxd4 Be6 19. Rxd6 Rxa2 20. Rxa2 Bxa2 21. e5 Rc8 22. e6 Kf8 23. c3 Ke7 24. Rxb6 Bxe6 25. Rxb7+ 1-0
