= Joaquim Durão =

Portuguese chess player

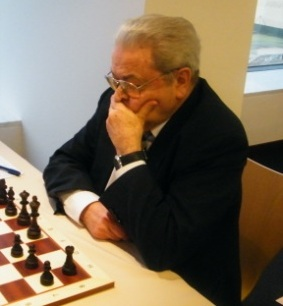
- Durão playing at the 2009 International Tournament at Figueira da Foz

Personal information
- Born: 25 October 1930 Lisbon, Portugal
- Died: 21 May 2015 (aged 84)

Chess career
- Country: Portugal
- Title: International Master (1975)
- Peak rating: 2360 (May 1974)

Joaquim Manuel Durão (25 October 1930 – 21 May 2015) was a Portuguese chess player. An International Master since 1975. Durão took part in The Gijon International Chess Tournaments (1955 and 1965). He was 13 times Portuguese champion, represented his country in ten Chess Olympiads, and was president of the Portuguese Chess Federation. in 1975 zonal he tied for an interzonal qualifying place but lost play-off to Sergio Mariotti.

He remained active until 2015.

He was born in Lisbon.

== Notable games ==
- Perez Perez vs. Durão 0-1, Beerwijk 1961 - the Portuguese master sacrifices his queen for a tempo
