= Rui Dâmaso =

Portuguese chess player (born 1968)

Personal information
- Born: 24 April 1968 (age 58)

Chess career
- Country: Portugal
- Title: International Master (1990)
- FIDE rating: 2416 (July 2026)
- Peak rating: 2485 (August 1997)

Rui Miguel Dâmaso Pereira de Almeida (born 24 April 1968) is a Portuguese chess International Master (1990) and six-time Portuguese Chess Championship winner (1986, 1993, 1995, 1999, 2007, 2013).
