= Luís Santos (chess player) =

Portuguese chess player (born 1955)

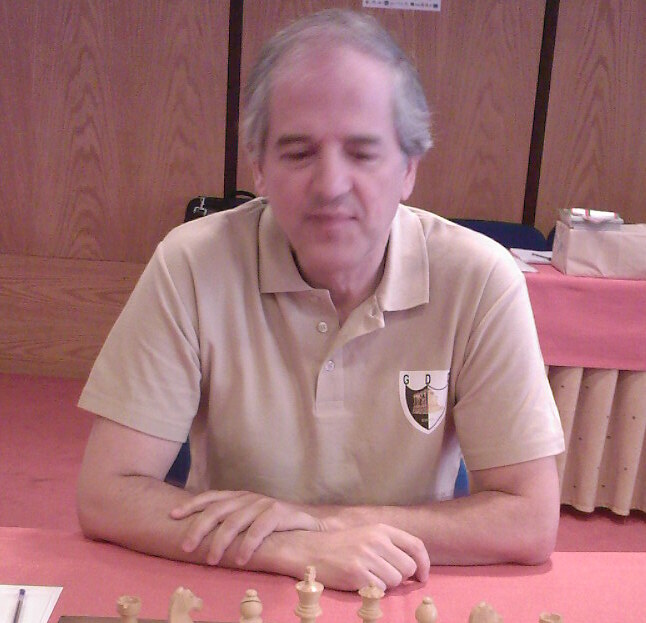

Personal information
- Born: 30 June 1955 (age 71) Lisbon, Portugal

Chess career
- Country: Portugal
- Title: International Master (1986)
- Peak rating: 2401 (October 2008)

Luís Santos (born 30 June 1955) is a Portuguese International Master chess player born in Lisbon. He won the Portuguese Chess Championship in 1978, 1979 and 1982.

In 1980, he played International Master Francisco Trois at Vigo in Spain. His opponent took two hours and 20 minutes considering two possible knight moves for his 7th move, which the chess.com website records as one of the slowest moves ever.

Santos was awarded the title of International Master (IM) in 1986 and International Correspondence Chess Grandmaster (ICCGM) in 1990.
