= Diogo Fernando =

Portuguese chess player (born 1980)

Personal information
- Born: 12 September 1980 (age 45)

Chess career
- Country: Portugal
- Title: International Master (2002)
- FIDE rating: 2453 (July 2026)
- Peak rating: 2496 (September 2009)

Diogo Fernando (born 12 September 1980) is a Portuguese chess International Master (2002) and one-time Portuguese Chess Championship winner (2003).
