= Carlos Pereira dos Santos =

Portuguese chess player (born 1972)

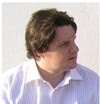

Personal information
- Born: 20 June 1972 (age 54)

Chess career
- Country: Portugal
- Title: International Master (1998)
- FIDE rating: 2404 (July 2026)
- Peak rating: 2433 (January 2006)

Carlos Pereira dos Santos (born 20 June 1972) is a Portuguese chess International Master (1998) and two-time Portuguese Chess Championship winner (1998, 2000).
