= Nikola Sedlak =

Serbian chess grandmaster (born 1983)

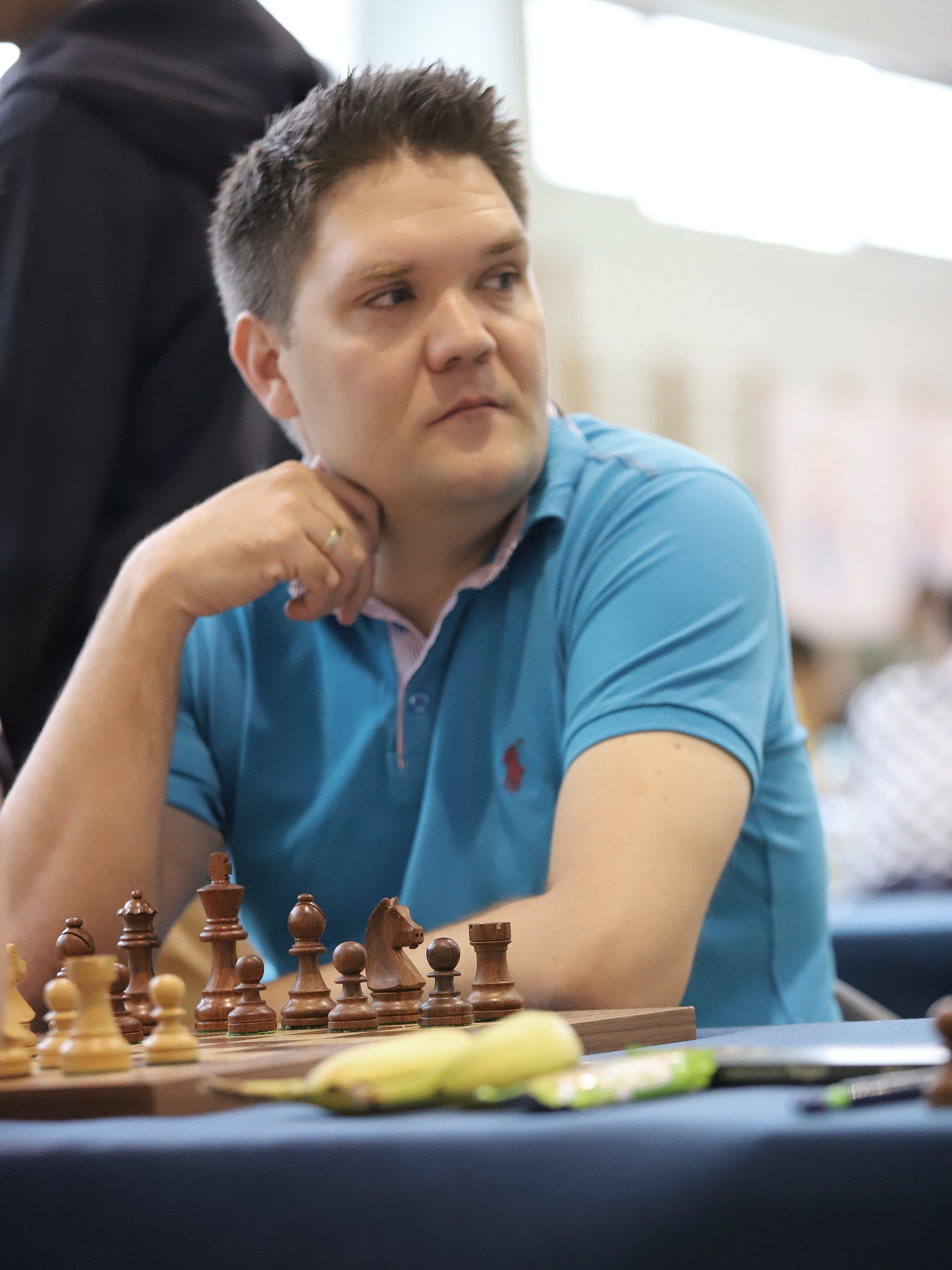
- Sedlak in 2019

Personal information
- Born: 13 December 1983 (age 42) Subotica, SR Serbia, SFR Yugoslavia

Chess career
- Country: Yugoslavia; Serbia and Montenegro; Serbia
- Title: Grandmaster (2003)
- Peak rating: 2609 (May 2018)

Nikola Sedlak (Serbian Cyrillic: Никола Седлак; born 13 December 1983) is a Serbian chess player who holds the titles of Grandmaster (GM) (2003), Serbian Chess Championship winner (2010), Chess Olympiad individual gold medal winner (2014), and EU Individual Open Chess Championship winner (2007).

== Career ==
In 2000, Sedlak won Yugoslav Youth Chess Championship in U18 age group. In 2001, he won silver medal in Yugoslav Junior Chess Championship in U20 age group. In 2002, Sedlak shared 1st place in Montenegrin Chess Championship. In 2010, he won Serbian Chess Championship. In 2014, Sedlak won bronze medal in Serbian Chess Championship.

Sedlak is winner of many international chess tournaments, including winning or sharing first place in Budapest (1999), Pula (2003), North Sea Cup in Esbjerg (2004), Subotica (2005), Zadar (2007), Boris Kostić memorial in Vršac (2008), Sarajevo (2009). In 2007 in Arvier he won 3rd Individual Open Chess Championship.

Sedlak played for Yugoslavia and Serbia in the Chess Olympiad:

- In 2006, at second board in the 37th Chess Olympiad in Turin (+4, =4, -4),
- In 2010, at first board in the 39th Chess Olympiad in Khanty-Mansiysk (+2, =5, -3),
- In 2012, at fourth board in the 40th Chess Olympiad in Istanbul (+5, =4, -0),
- In 2014, at fourth board in the 41st Chess Olympiad in Tromsø (+5, =3, -0) and won individual gold medal,
- In 2016, at third board in the 42nd Chess Olympiad in Baku (+0, =3, -4).

Sedlak played for Yugoslavia and Serbia in the European Team Chess Championships:

- In 2003, at reserve board in the 14th European Team Chess Championship in Plovdiv (+0, =2, -1),
- In 2007, at reserve board in the 16th European Team Chess Championship in Heraklion (+3, =2, -3),
- In 2009, at second board in the 17th European Team Chess Championship in Novi Sad (+2, =3, -3),
- In 2015, at fourth board in the 20th European Team Chess Championship in Reykjavík (+2, =4, -2),
- In 2017, at reserve board in the 21st European Team Chess Championship in Hersonissos (+3, =2, -0),
- In 2019, at second board in the 22nd European Team Chess Championship in Batumi (+3, =2, -4).

In 2000, he was awarded the FIDE International Master (IM) title and received the FIDE Grandmaster (GM) title three years later.
