= Rúben Pereira (chess player) =

Portuguese chess player (born 1991)

Personal information
- Born: 9 January 1991 (age 35)

Chess career
- Country: Portugal
- Title: International Master (1998)
- FIDE rating: 2440 (November 2026)
- Peak rating: 2457 (August 2024)

Rúben Pereira (born 9 January 1991) is a Portuguese chess International Master, 2009 Portuguese chess champion, and 2007 World U-16 vice-champion. His January 2023 FIDE rating is 2445, making him the country's number four.
