= Paulo Dias (chess player) =

Portuguese chess player (born 1979)

Personal information
- Born: 5 January 1979 (age 47)

Chess career
- Country: Portugal
- Title: International Master (2011)
- Peak rating: 2454 (November 2011)

Paulo Jorge Guimarães Dias (born 5 January 1979) is a Portuguese chess International Master (2011) and two-time Portuguese Chess Championship winner (2010, 2011).
