= Pampilhosa da Serra =

- Municipality
- Town of Pampilhosa da Serra
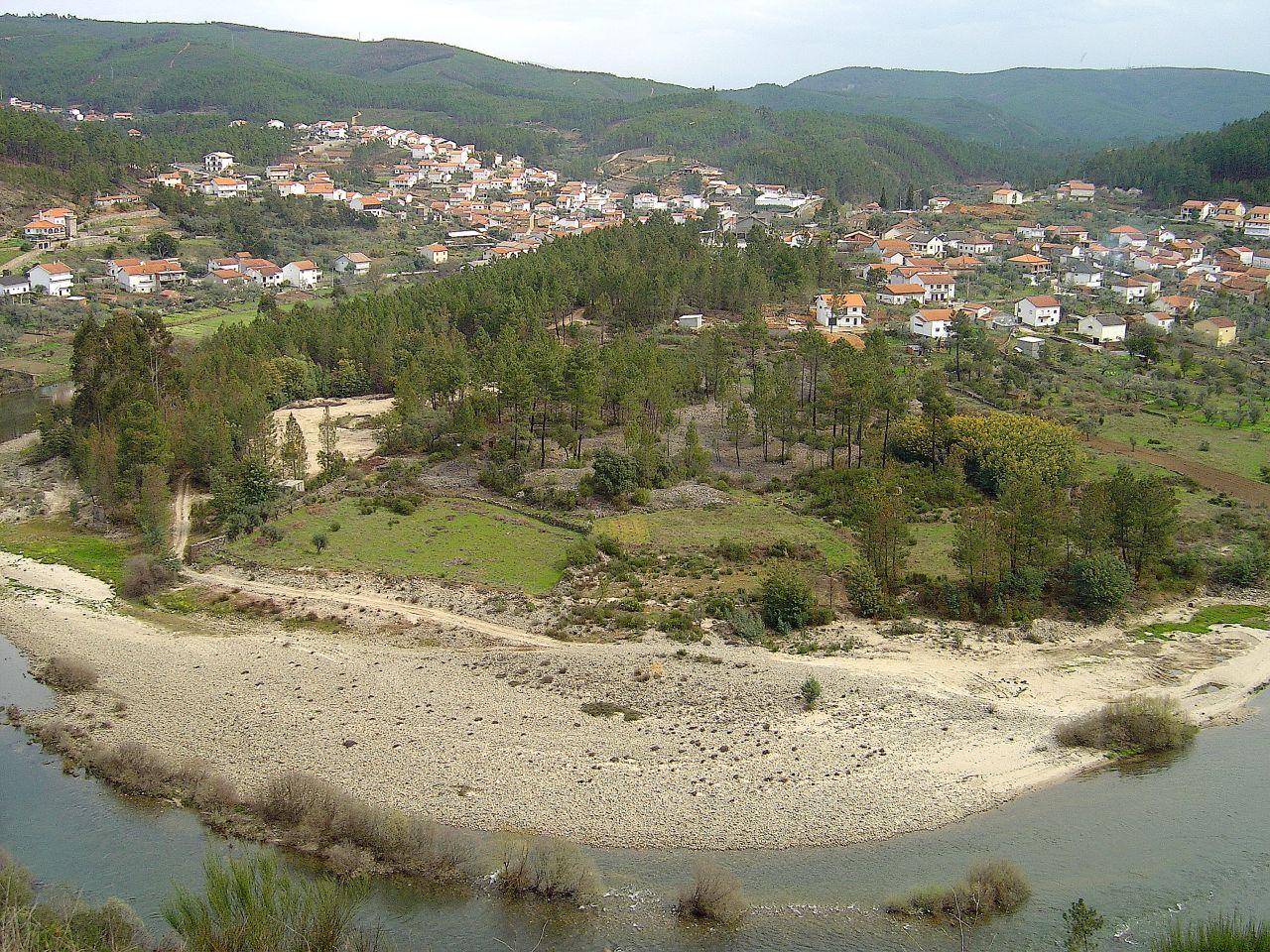
- Parish of Dornelas do Zêzere

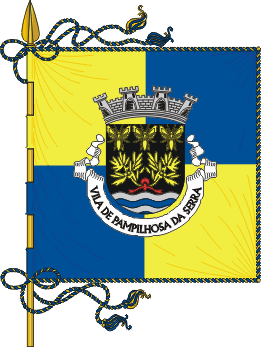
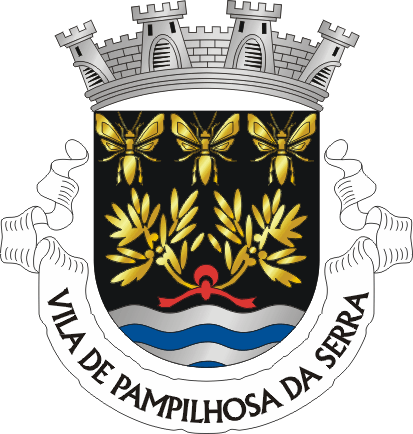
- Flag Coat of arms
- Interactive map of Pampilhosa da Serra
- Coordinates: 40°03′N 7°57′W
- Country: Portugal
- Region: Centro
- Intermunic. comm.: Região de Coimbra
- District: Coimbra
- Parishes: 8

Area
  - Total: 396.46 km^{2} (153.07 sq mi)

Population (2011)
  - Total: 4,481
  - Density: 11.30/km^{2} (29.27/sq mi)
- Time zone: UTC+00:00 (WET)
  - Summer (DST): UTC+01:00 (WEST)
- Website: www.cm-pampilhosadaserra.pt

Pampilhosa da Serra (European Portuguese pronunciation: [pɐ̃piˈʎɔzɐ ðɐ ˈsɛʁɐ]), officially the Town of Pampilhosa da Serra (Portuguese: Vila de Pampilhosa da Serra), is a town and a municipality in the Coimbra District, in Portugal. The population in 2011 was 4,481, in an area of 396.46 km².

== Parishes ==
Administratively, the municipality is divided into 8 civil parishes (freguesias):

- Cabril
- Dornelas do Zêzere
- Fajão - Vidual
- Janeiro de Baixo
- Pampilhosa da Serra
- Pessegueiro
- Portela do Fojo - Machio
- Unhais-o-Velho

== Notable people ==
- António Fernandes (born 1962 in Pampilhosa da Serra) a chess player, became Grandmaster in 2003
- Tony Carreira (born 1963 in Armadouro) a Portuguese musician.
