= António Fernandes (chess player) =

Portuguese chess grandmaster (born 1962)

Personal information
- Born: 18 October 1962 (age 63) Pampilhosa da Serra, Portugal

Chess career
- Country: Portugal
- Title: Grandmaster (2003)
- Peak rating: 2490 (January 1998)

António Fernandes (born 18 October 1962) is a Portuguese chess grandmaster. Fernandes became an International Master (IM) in 1985 and earned the Grandmaster (GM) title in 2003.
