= David Howell (chess player) =

English chess grandmaster (born 1990)

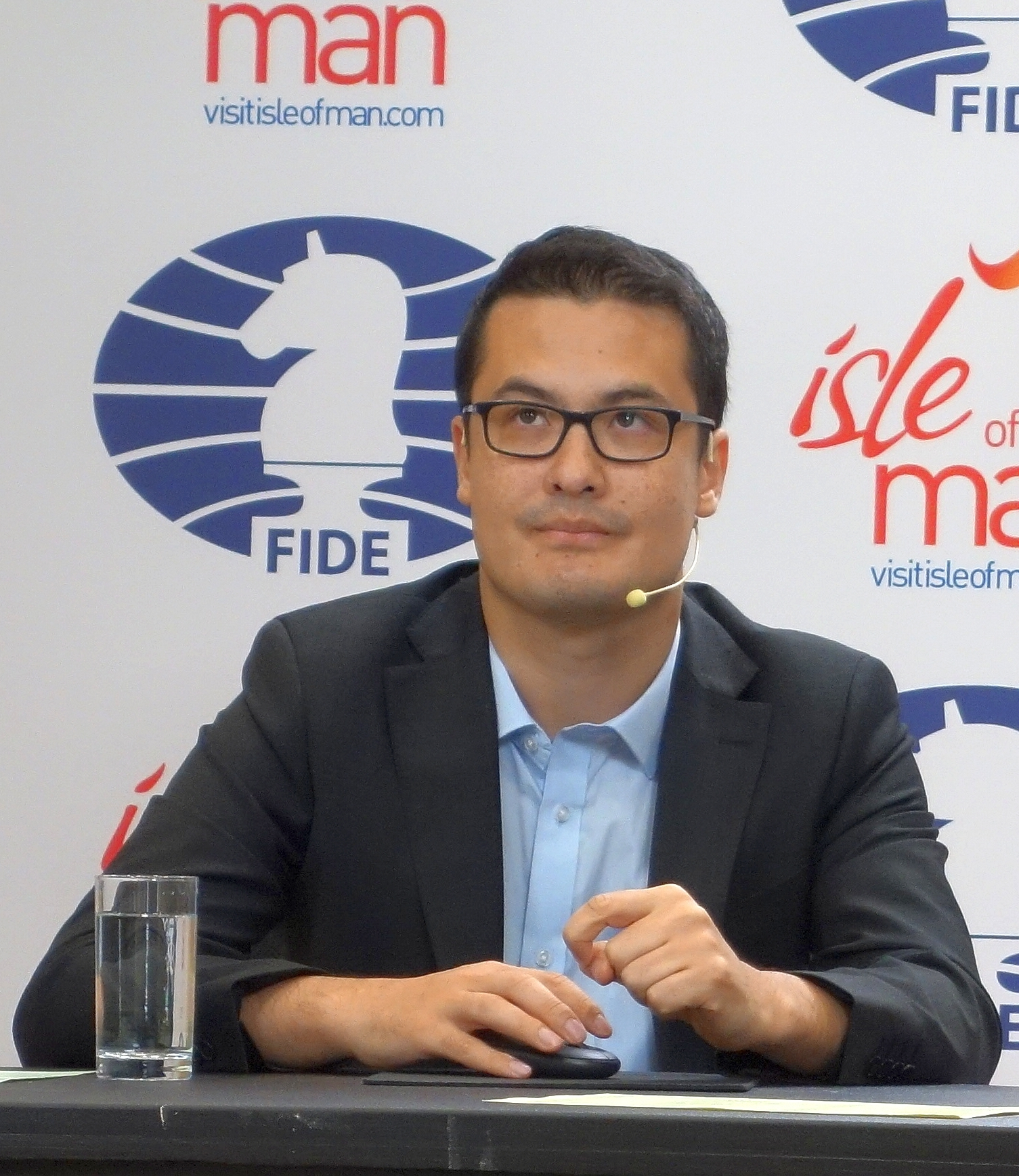
- Howell in 2023

Personal information
- Born: David Wei Liang Howell; 14 November 1990 (age 35) Eastbourne, England

Chess career
- Country: England
- Title: Grandmaster (2007)
- FIDE rating: 2665 (August 2026)
- Peak rating: 2712 (August 2015)
- Ranking: No. 51 (August 2026)
- Peak ranking: No. 36 (August 2015)

David Wei Liang Howell (born 14 November 1990) is an English chess grandmaster and commentator. A three-time British champion (2009, 2013 and 2014), he is also the second-youngest British person to achieve the title of Grandmaster, earned at the age of 16.

== Personal life ==
Howell was born in Eastbourne to Angeline Liang and Martin Howell. He has a younger sister. He lives in Oslo, Norway.

== Career ==
=== 1998–2007: Chess prodigy to Grandmaster ===
Howell has been playing chess since the age of five years and eight months, following his father's purchase of a second-hand chess set at a jumble sale. He quickly learned to defeat his father and soon came to the attention of the Sussex Junior Chess Association, where he received tuition from a number of established county players. He progressed rapidly and became the British champion in the age categories Under 8, Under 9 and Under 10.

In August 1999, Howell became famous internationally when he broke the world record for the youngest player to have defeated a Grandmaster in an official game. Aged eight, he defeated John Nunn in a blitz game at the Mind Sports Olympiad. Howell held this record until 2024. He was the youngest player in the world to have qualified to compete in a national chess championship, taking part in the British Chess Championship in August 2000. He came fourth in the Player of the Year ballot held by the British Chess Federation during 2000.

In 2001, Howell came joint first at the European Youth Chess Championships in the Under 12 category and joint second at the World Youth Chess Championships in the same category. In the Hastings Challengers tournament in January 2001, Howell became the youngest ever British player to defeat a grandmaster at classical time controls when he beat Colin McNab.

In March 2002, Howell drew the last of four games with the Einstein Group World Champion, Vladimir Kramnik, becoming the youngest player in the world to score against a reigning world chess champion in an organized chess match. The resulting publicity led to articles in all the main British national newspapers and appearances on CBBC, Channel 4 News, and Richard & Judy.

The extensive coverage he received as the UK's most gifted young chess player also spread to appearances on breakfast television, Blue Peter, Nickelodeon, Good Morning America, and several local news programmes. At a televised awards show for Britain's most talented youngsters, Patrick Moore presented an award to him.

Progress was perhaps more measured during his early-to-mid-teens, but Howell continued to meet all the milestone challenges, first gaining the International Master title, and culminating in becoming a grandmaster at the age of sixteen, the youngest ever in the UK. Along the way, he performed well at the Hastings knockout-style tournament (2004–5 edition), where he was eliminated at the quarter-final (round 5) stage by the strong Polish GM Bartosz Soćko.

Despite his sustained efforts at chess, he continued to study for his French, German (fluent in both) and Mathematics A-levels, at Eastbourne College.

He obtained the three norms required for the title Grandmaster (GM) between 2004 and 2007; these comprised the 4NCL team tournament (season 2004/5), the CCA-ICC International at New York City 2005 and Stockholm's Rilton Cup 2006/7. In this last tournament he tied for second place, qualifying for the grandmaster title on 5 January 2007, aged 16. By doing so, Howell broke Luke McShane's record as the youngest grandmaster ever from the UK, set in 2000, by six months.

=== 2007–present day: Tournament success and continued rating climb ===
Since becoming a grandmaster in 2007, Howell has participated in a variety of competitions; he took a share of fourth place in the British championship that year and went on to scoop the English Chess Federation's Player of the Year Award.

A significant rise in his Elo rating followed his achievements of 2008, beginning with victory at the Andorra Open, where he scored 8/9 points, ahead of experienced grandmasters Julio Granda Zuñiga and Mihail Marin. He followed this with a share of third place at the World Junior Chess Championship in Gaziantep, where he was always challenging for the lead. At the very strong EU Individual Open Chess Championship in Liverpool he finished with a share of fifth place despite a loss on time and then went on to win the annual Winterthur Masters event, ahead of other grandmasters, among them former Paraguayan champion Axel Bachmann and former Swiss champions Joseph Gallagher and Florian Jenni. At the Chess Olympiad of 2008, held in Dresden, he joined the England team on board 3 and contributed 7½/11 for a tournament performance rating (TPR) of 2675.

Howell was the British Rapidplay Chess Champion in 2008 with a score of 10/11 points, and in 2009 with 9/11. He tied for first with Andrei Istrățescu, Romain Edouard and Mark Hebden in the 2009/10 Hastings International Chess Congress. In August 2009, Howell won the British championship for the first time scoring 9/11. He placed third in the London Chess Classic in December. He won the British Rapidplay Chess Championship again in 2010 with a score of 10½/11. In 2012 Howell won the Leiden Chess Tournament. In August 2013 Howell won his second British championship title with 9½/11 points. The following year he shared first place with Jonathan Hawkins in the 101st British Chess Championship. Howell took clear second place at the 2015 Gibraltar Masters tournament with a score of 8/10, half-point behind Hikaru Nakamura. In December 2015, Howell won the inaugural British Knockout Championship, held alongside the 7th London Chess Classic, by defeating in the final Nicholas Pert 4–2.

In the FIDE rating list of August 2015 he reached a rating of 2712 and thus joined the ranks of the 2700+ players for the first time. Howell represented England in the 42nd and 43rd Chess Olympiads, helping his team to 9th and 5th places, respectively. In 2019, Howell came close to qualifying for the Candidates tournament after a series of good results in the FIDE Grand Swiss tournament, before losing to Wang Hao, the eventual qualifier.

At Astana in 2019, Howell was part of the England Team that won the silver medal at the World Team Chess Championship. His performance on board 3 also earned him an individual bronze medal.

He also earned an individual gold medal on board 3 at the 44th Chess Olympiad in 2022, achieving the event's highest performance rating.

Howell regularly hosts chess24 commentary of major tournaments, such as the 2020/21 Candidates. He currently resides in the Oslo area.
