= Gawain Maroroa Jones =

English chess grandmaster (born 1987)

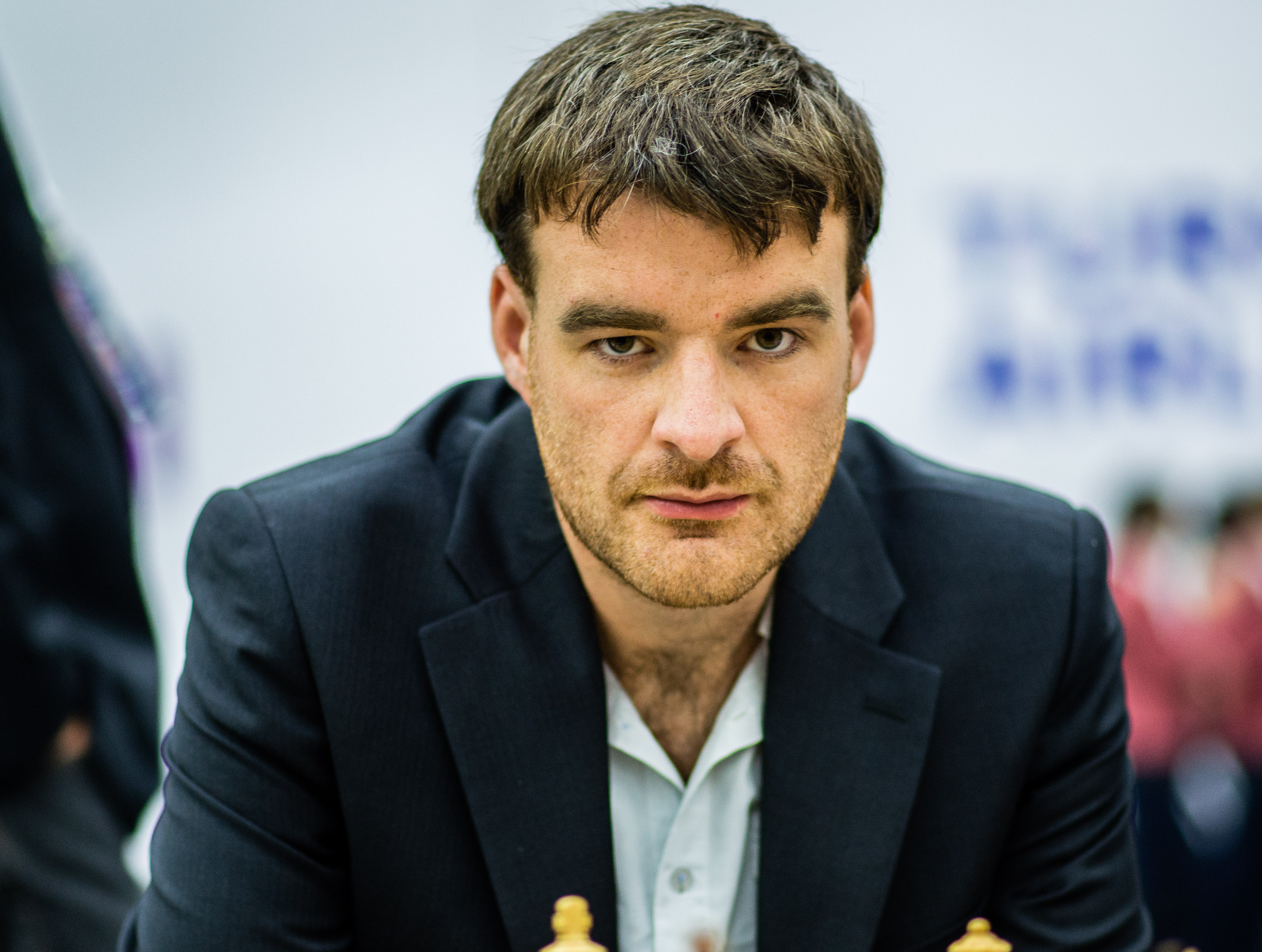
- Jones in 2016

Personal information
- Born: Gawain Christopher Bernard Jones; 11 December 1987 (age 38) Keighley, West Yorkshire, England
- Spouse: Sue Maroroa (m. 2012; died 2023)

Chess career
- Country: England
- Title: Grandmaster (2007)
- FIDE rating: 2639 (July 2026)
- Peak rating: 2709 (June 2019)
- Ranking: No. 85 (July 2026)
- Peak ranking: No. 32 (June 2019)

Gawain Christopher Bernard Maroroa Jones (born 11 December 1987) is an English chess grandmaster and three-time British Chess Champion. He was awarded the grandmaster title by FIDE in 2007. He competed in the FIDE World Cup in 2013, 2017 and 2019.

== Career ==
Born Gawain Jones, he began playing chess at the age of four, competing in his first tournaments at six. In early 1997 he hit the headlines and was featured on the front page of The Guardian newspaper when he became the youngest player in the world ever to beat an International Master in an official tournament game. He has represented England in the World Junior and World Youth Championships on many occasions and since 2008 has been one of England's highest rated players. He was awarded the GM title in 2007.

An active player on the tournament circuit, he secured his Grandmaster title with successful results at the 2nd EU Individual Open Championship in Liverpool in 2006, 2006 European Club Cup in Fügen and 4NCL 2006/7 season. Elsewhere in Europe, he took first place at Porto San Giorgio and La Laguna (both 2007). During his stay in Australasia, there were many more tournament successes, including a share of first place at the Sydney International 2008 and creditable second places at the Doeberl Cup 2008 and Queenstown Classic 2009.

He shared first place with Simon Williams at the London Chess Classic FIDE Open 2010. In 2011, he won the Bunratty Masters, ahead of Nigel Short, whom he defeated in their individual encounter, and the Commonwealth Chess Championship in Ekurhuleni. He won the British Chess Championship in 2012. He later won the 2012/13 Hastings International Chess Congress as clear first.

In December 2014, he won the Challenge Match against Romain Édouard by 4–2; it was a six-game match held concurrently with the London Chess Classic. In 2016, Jones won the New Zealand Open in January, and the Dubai Open in April edging out Vladimir Akopian on tiebreak. The next year he won at Dubai for the second time, becoming the first player to do so. Jones edged out this time Mustafa Yilmaz, Vidit Gujrathi, Eduardo Iturrizaga, Ahmed Adly, Sergei Zhigalko and Aleksandr Rakhmanov on tiebreak score. He won the British Chess Championship a second time in 2017.

In team competitions, he has played for England in the Chess Olympiad, the World Team Chess Championship, the European Team Chess Championship and the World Youth Under 16 Chess Olympiad. At the 2019 World Team Championship in Astana, England took the silver medal and Jones also won an individual silver playing on board four.

In 2024, he won the British Chess Championship for a third time, defeating David Howell in a playoff. Later in the year, he won the London Chess Classic with an undefeated 5/7 score.

== Personal life ==
Born in Keighley, West Yorkshire, Maroroa Jones has lived in Italy, Ireland, Australia and New Zealand. In 2010, he returned to the United Kingdom to live in London in order to focus on his chess career and related projects.

He was married to WIM Sue Maroroa, who died due to complications from childbirth in 2023. They had two children together. In 2025, he began competing under the combined surname Maroroa Jones.

== Books ==
- Jones, Gawain (2008). Starting Out: Sicilian Grand Prix Attack. Everyman Chess. ISBN 978-1857445473.
- Palliser, Richard; Emms, John; Ward, Chris; Jones, Gawain (2008). Dangerous Weapons: the Benoni and Benko - Dazzle Your Opponents!. Everyman Chess. ISBN 978-1857445718.
- Jones, Gawain (2011). How to Beat the Sicilian Defence - An Anti-Sicilian Repertoire for White. Everyman Chess. ISBN 978-1857446630.
- Jones, Gawain (2015). The Dragon. Volume One. Quality Chess. ISBN 978-1784830076.
- Jones, Gawain (2015). The Dragon. Volume Two. Quality Chess. ISBN 978-1784830090.
- Jones, Gawain (2021). Coffeehouse Repertoire 1.e4 Volume 1. Everyman Chess. ISBN 978-1784831455.
