= Stephen J. Gordon =

British chess player (born 1986)

Stephen Gordon
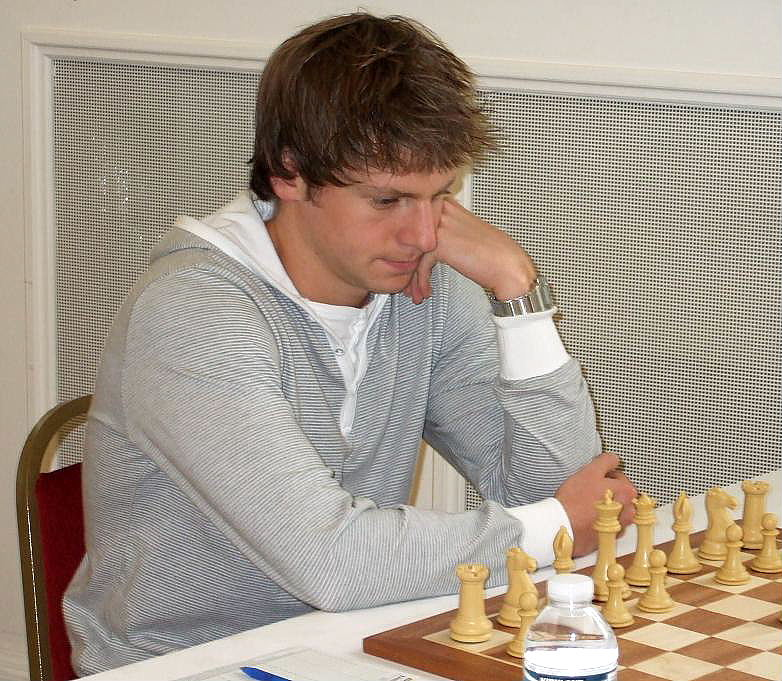
- Stephen Gordon in 2008

Personal information
- Born: Stephen John Gordon; 4 September 1986 (age 39) Oldham, England

Chess career
- Country: England
- Title: Grandmaster (2009)
- FIDE rating: 2429 (July 2026)
- Peak rating: 2556 (September 2012)

Stephen John Gordon (born 4 September 1986) is an English chess grandmaster.

== Chess career ==
In September 2004 he took a break from his A-level studies at The Blue Coat School, Oldham to compete in the thirteenth Monarch Assurance Isle of Man International.

In 2005, while still a FIDE Master, he finished 6th in the British Championships ahead of a Grandmaster and several International Masters.

At the EU Individual Open Chess Championship held at Liverpool in 2006, he led the tournament after eight rounds and finished a very creditable (joint) second, a half point behind winner Nigel Short and level with Luke McShane among others.

Probably his best result to date however, was second place in the 2007 British Championship, narrowly losing his share of the lead in the final round. In other rounds, he defeated both tournament victor Jacob Aagaard and previous champion Jonathan Rowson.

By 2008, his rating had reached grandmaster level, although the title itself had not yet been secured. At the British Championship in Liverpool, he almost repeated his performance of the previous year, by taking a share of third place. He was the British under-21 Champion each consecutive year between 2005 and 2008. He became a grandmaster on 1 August 2009.

He has been one of the co-presenters of the chess podcast The Full English Breakfast since its inaugural show in October 2010.

== Achievements ==
- British Under 10 Champion - 1997
- England Under 11 Champion - 1998
- England Junior Squad Under 18 Champion - 2003
- England Junior Squad Under 21 Champion - 2003
- Isle of Man Under 18 Champion - 2002, 2003
- British Under 18 Champion - 2005
- British Under 21 Champion - 2005, 2006, 2007, 2008
