= Luke McShane =

English chess grandmaster (born 1984)

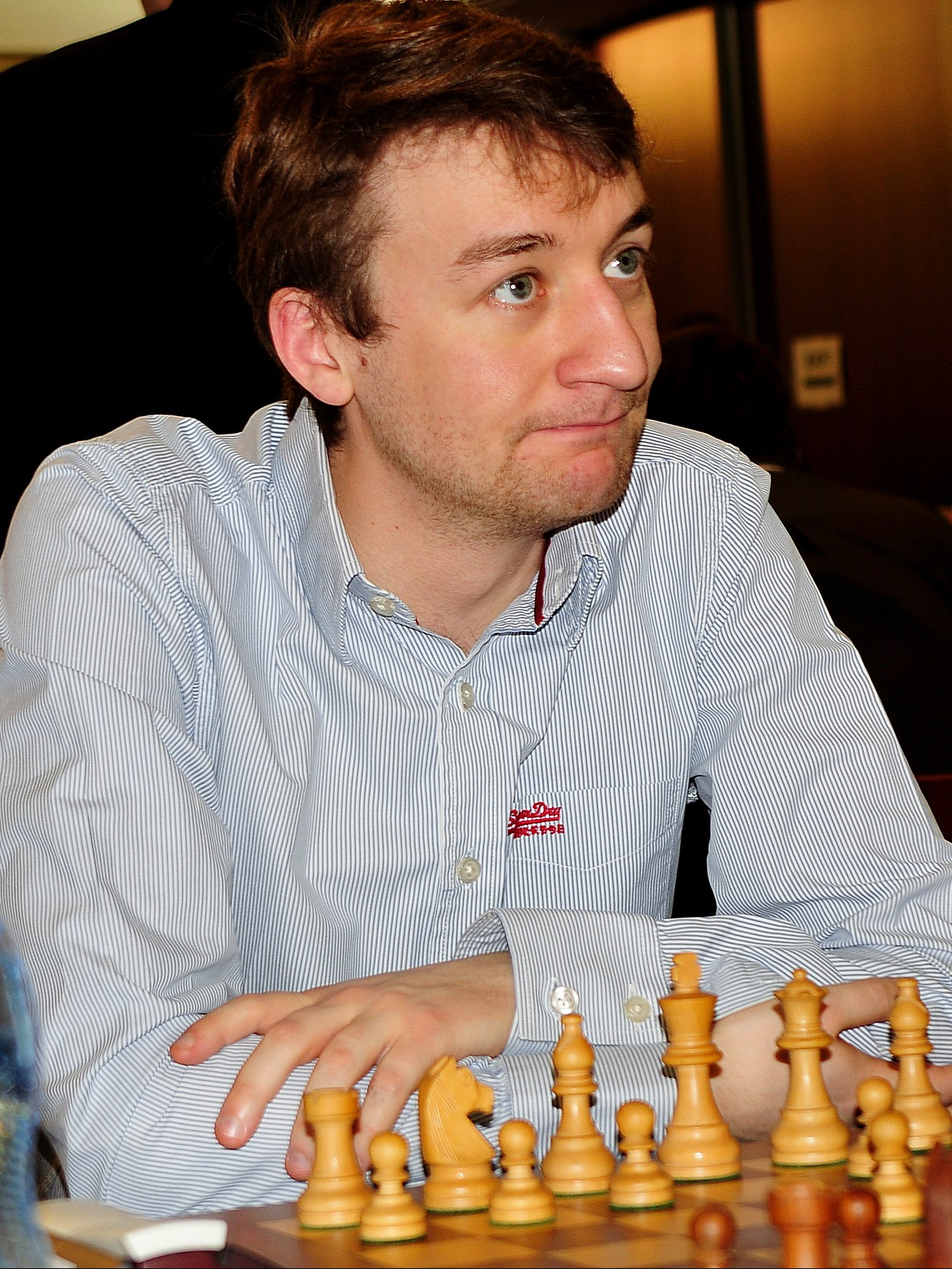
- McShane at the 2013 European Chess Team Championship

Personal information
- Born: Luke James McShane; 7 January 1984 (age 42) London, England

Chess career
- Country: England
- Title: Grandmaster (2000)
- FIDE rating: 2606 (November 2026)
- Peak rating: 2713 (July 2012)
- Peak ranking: No. 29 (November 2012)

Luke James McShane (born 7 January 1984) is an English chess player. A chess prodigy, he was awarded the title of Grandmaster by FIDE in 2000, at the age of 16. McShane has become one of England's leading players and a member of the national team. He also worked as a trader in London's financial sector, and has previously been described as the world's strongest amateur chess player.

== Early career ==
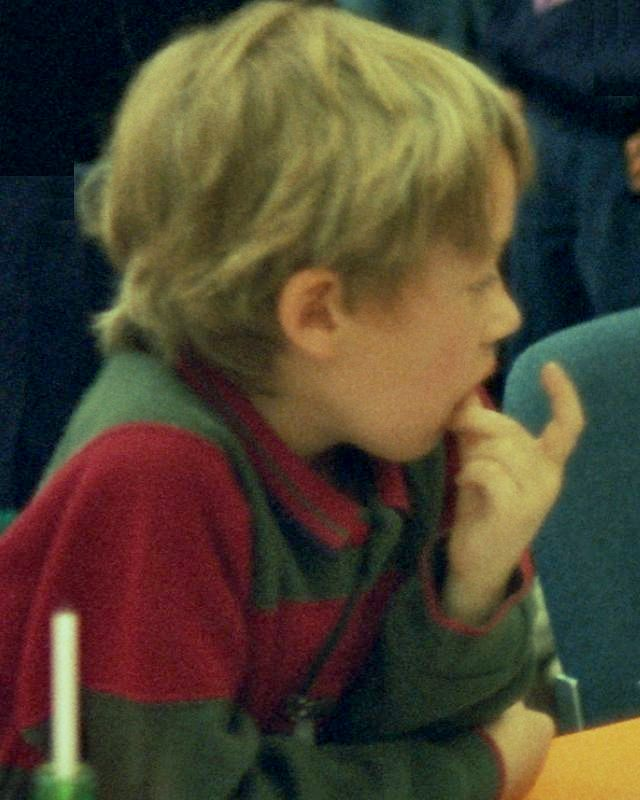
Luke McShane, 1992 at Duisburg

McShane won the World Under 10 Championship in Duisburg at the age of eight. Shortly afterwards he found a sponsor in the form of computer company Psion and played Garry Kasparov at a simultaneous exhibition in 1995. At sixteen he became the youngest ever Briton to achieve the title Grandmaster, gaining the three results required ("norms") in tournaments in Germany, Iceland and the Politiken Cup in Copenhagen, Denmark. He held the record until David Howell broke it in January 2007. In January 2004 McShane was ranked second in the world among junior (under 21) players behind Teimour Radjabov.

== Grandmaster ==
Among McShane's more notable results are joint first in the 1998 Bunratty Masters in Ireland with John Nunn, winning five of his six games, and joint winner with Stuart Conquest and Bogdan Lalić of the Iona Technologies International Masters in Kilkenny. McShane led the 2002 British Championship in Torquay, and was in a good position in the final round before blundering and losing to the tournament's winner, Ramachandran Ramesh. McShane finished tied for fourth.

From around 2002, McShane has been facing stiffer opposition, including players from the world's top ten. He played for England in the Chess Olympiad in Bled, scoring 6½/11 points, and won the silver medal at the World Junior Championship in Goa. In 2003, he finished fifth in the Hrokurinn tournament in Reykjavík, finishing ahead of Britain's number one player Michael Adams and drawing games against Viktor Korchnoi and Alexei Shirov. Shortly afterwards, he beat Shirov in a Reykjavík blitz tournament. In the 2003 Sigeman & Co tournament in Malmö, he finished third with a score of 5½/9, drawing his game with the tournament winner, Vasily Ivanchuk. Also in 2003, McShane finished 27th out of 207 with 8/13 in the European Individual Championship in Silivri in Turkey, 1½ points behind the winner, Zurab Azmaiparashvili. Shortly afterwards, he tied for first with Alexei Dreev and Krishnan Sasikiran in the North Sea Cup played in Esbjerg in Denmark with 6½/9, finished tied for second in the Politiken Cup in Copenhagen with 8½/11 and won the Malmö Masters with 7½/9, a point and a half ahead of his nearest rival. In 2009/10, he tied for first through fifth place with Eduardas Rozentalis, Pavel Ponkratov, Radosław Wojtaszek and Igor Lysyj at the 39th Rilton Cup in Stockholm. In 2010, he won the third Remco Heite tournament in Wolvega.

McShane is a strong blitz chess player. He won the 136-player Kuppenheim tournament in 2003 ahead of Vladimir Epishin and former German blitz champion Robert Rabiega, finishing with a score of 50½/53 points. In this tournament, he played his games over the Internet, while all other participants were in the playing hall in Germany. In 2003, he won the British Blitz Championship held at Uxbridge with a score of 14½/16 and the Greenland Open rapid tournament with 8½/9.

In 2009 and 2010, McShane participated in the London Chess Classic. He finished mid-table at the tournament's inaugural showing and took the best game prize for his win against Hikaru Nakamura. The 2010 tournament included Viswanathan Anand (reigning world chess champion), Magnus Carlsen (rated number one for most of 2010) and Vladimir Kramnik (former world champion). Under a scoring system of 3 points for a win, 1 for a draw and 0 for a loss, McShane finished joint second with Anand, behind Carlsen, whom McShane had beaten in their individual encounter, and ahead of Kramnik. Undefeated, his event performance rating was 2838 – higher than Carlsen's or Anand's. In the January 2011 rating list, he briefly topped Nigel Short to become the UK's second-highest-ranked player (after Michael Adams).

In January 2011, McShane came joint first with David Navara in the 'B group' of the Tata Steel tournament, winning on tie break and qualifying, with Navara, for the 2012 'A group' but did not play, owing to work commitments.

McShane participated in the Tal Memorial in Moscow in June 2012. Seeded in last place, he beat Levon Aronian, then the world ranked number two, in a game where he sacrificed the exchange for the initiative. He then followed up with wins against Alexander Morozevich and Vladimir Kramnik, his combative performances rewarding voters of the online poll responsible for securing his wildcard place, ahead of Alexei Shirov and Shakhriyar Mamedyarov. However, he finished last but one (tied eighth), after losing to Magnus Carlsen, Fabiano Caruana, Teimour Radjabov and Alexander Grischuk.

McShane was particularly active in the USA during 2015. In June, he won the (Arlington) DC International with 7/9. The following month, he finished the World Open on 6½/9, a half-point behind the leading group. In October, he returned for the Las Vegas Millionaire Chess event, and narrowly failed to qualify for the knockout phase, but completed the Open event with 7/9, leaving him tied equal first with Wesley So, Fabiano Caruana and Evgeniy Najer.

He was booked to give a simultaneous display at the 2015 London Chess Classic, but also entered two of the Festival events. The first was the inaugural British Knockout Championship, where he was eliminated by Nick Pert in the semi-final. At the Super Rapidplay Open, in a field that included 33 grandmasters, he was the winner with 9½/10, a full point clear of second place.

In Katowice 2017, he took the silver medal at the European Blitz Championship, with a score of 17½/22, a half-point behind Sergei Zhigalko. McShane's finish placed him ahead of the highly rated Jan-Krzysztof Duda and David Navara, with the total number of participants being in excess of one thousand.

McShane participated in the 2019 World Team Championship, held in Astana, as a member of the English team. England took the silver medal and he also won the individual gold on board two.

== Education and part-time status ==
McShane attended Westminster Under School and then City of London School, before entering Oxford University in 2003, where he read philosophy and mathematics at University College. In the summer of 2006 he interned at Goldman Sachs in FICC. After graduating in the summer of 2007, he worked there as a trader. A brief increase in his chess activity occurred when he subsequently left his job, but he was forced to decline his invitation to the 2011 British Championship when he later returned to full-time employment. He continues to play in a reduced capacity and has been referred to as the world's strongest amateur.

== Columnist ==
McShane has been the chess columnist of The Spectator since October 2019.
