= World Rapid and Blitz Team Chess Championships 2025 =

June 2025 FIDE event, London

FIDE World Rapid and Blitz Team Championships 2025
Tournament information
- Sport: Chess
- Location: London, United Kingdom
- Dates: 10–16 June 2025
- Format: Rapid and blitz chess
- Venue: Novotel London West
- Teams: 54
- Purse: €500,000

Final positions
- Champions: Rapid: Team MGD1 Blitz: WR Chess Team

The World Rapid and Blitz Team Chess Championships 2025 was a team chess tournament organized by the International Chess Federation (FIDE) to determine the world team champions in chess played under rapid and blitz time controls. It was held in London, United Kingdom, from 10 to 16 June 2025.

The rapid championship took place from 11 to 13 June and the blitz championship was played from 14 to 15 June. The prize money was €500,000, of which €310,000 was for the rapid event and €190,000 was for the blitz.

The defending champions were Al-Ain ACMG UAE in the rapid event and WR Chess Team in the blitz event. Team MGD1 won the World Rapid Team Championship, and WR Chess Team successfully defended their blitz title.

== Schedule ==
OC	Opening ceremony	TM	Technical Meeting	R	Rapid round	B	Blitz round	CC	Closing ceremony

June	11th Sun	12th Mon	13th Tue	14th Wed	15th Thu
Ceremonies	OC				CC
Meetings	TM				
Rapid	R1-4	R5-8	R9-12		
Blitz				Pools	Knockout

== Prize Fund ==
Event	Winner	2nd	3rd	4th	5th	6th	1st Under 2400	1st Under 2200	Total
Rapid	€110,000	€70,000	€50,000	€30,000	€20,000	€15,000	€10,000	€5,000	€310,000
Blitz	€75,000	€50,000	€30,000	€20,000	€15,000	—N/a	—N/a	—N/a	€190,000

Note: Prize money is per team

== Teams ==
SNo	Team name	Captain	Players	Avg
1	WR Chess Team	Jan Gustafsson	Ian Nepomniachtchi (2762), Alireza Firouzja (2753), Maxime Vachier-Lagrave (2735), Hikaru Nakamura (2734), Hou Yifan (2539), Wadim Rosenstein (1704), Jan-Krzysztof Duda (2718), Wesley So (2714), Alexandra Kosteniuk (2483)	2531
2	KazChess	Gulmira Dauletova	Richard Rapport (2709), Alexander Grischuk (2696), Parham Maghsoodloo (2670), Andrey Esipenko (2651), Meruert Kamalidenova (2380), Darmen Dauren (1932), Darmen Sadvakasov (2587), Aldiyar Ansat (2383), Elnaz Kaliakhmet (2238)	2524
3	Malcolm's Mates	William Watson	Luke McShane (2702), Gawain Jones (2635), Michael Adams (2628), Ivan Saric (2597), Irina Bulmaga (2372), Murat Omarov (1918), Nikita Vitiugov (2590), Elmira Mirzoeva (2176), Alfred Soulier (2042)	2496
4	Uzbekistan	Saydali Yuldashev	Nodirbek Abdusattorov (2732), Javokhir Sindarov (2668), Rustam Kasimdzhanov (2641), Nodirbek Yakubboev (2547), Afruza Khamdamova (2406), Nilufarkhon Imomkuzieva (1943), Shamsiddin Vokhidov (2519), Gulrukhbegim Tokhirjonova (2282)	2490
5	Freedom	Emil Sutovsky	Viswanathan Anand (2719), Le Quang Liem (2645), Samuel Sevian (2636), Rauf Mamedov (2617), Anna Muzychuk (2409), Sarbartho Mani (1871), Haik M. Martirosyan (2610), Alexey Sarana (2603), Teodora Injac (2309)	2483
6	Team MGD1	Srinath Narayanan	Arjun Erigaisi (2708), Pentala Harikrishna (2634), David Anton Guijarro (2625), Pranav V (2537), Stavroula Tsolakidou (2394), Atharvaa P Tayade (1952), Leon Luke Mendonca (2477), Srinath Narayanan (2440), Hariharan Raghavan (1400)	2475
7	Germany and Friends	Dennis Wagner	Vincent Keymer (2649), Rasmus Svane (2616), Matthias Bluebaum (2596), Alexander Donchenko (2561), Dinara Wagner (2372), Bohdan Lobkin (1902), Dmitrij Kollars (2553), Frederik Svane (2476), Luisa Bashylina (2065)	2449
8	Ashdod Elit Chess Club	Moshe Slav	Nihal Sarin (2676), Pavel Eljanov (2614), Benjamin Gledura (2575), Andrei Volokitin (2568), Yuliia Osmak (2343), Aldiyar Sailaubay (1831), Alexander Moiseenko (2533), Ilia Smirin (2513), Maria Manakova (2170)	2435
9	Hexamind Chess Team	Daria Panarina	Levon Aronian (2746), Leinier Dominguez Perez (2708), Anish Giri (2688), Vidit Gujrathi (2650), Divya Deshmukh (2386), Platon Panarin (1400), Volodar Murzin (2637), David Muradyan (1400), Mark Panarin (1400)	2430
10	Knight Dance	Elliot Papadiamandis	Jorden van Foreest (2640), Jules Moussard (2609), Daniel Dardha (2582), Marc'Andria Maurizzi (2472), Eline Roebers (2404), Theo Phulpin (1754), Elliot Papadiamandis (2247)	2410
11	Team Hungary	Csaba Balogh	Csaba Balogh (2609), Ádám Kozák (2577), Gergely Kantor (2545), Viktor Erdos (2525), Zsoka Gaal (2218), Almos Kiran Marton-John (1909), Robert Ruck (2460)	2397
12	Rishon LeZion Chess Club	Alexander Kaspi	Boris Gelfand (2622), Maxim Rodshtein (2603), Nitzan Steinberg (2516), Yahli Sokolovsky (2367), Marsel Efroimski (2337), Michal Lahav (2100), Or Bronstein (2345), Eran Lapushnian (1916), Yossi Raiko (1911)	2394
13	Generation XYZA	Selim Ziya Gurcan	Shakhriyar Mamedyarov (2701), Dragan Solak (2591), Ediz Gurel (2452), Yagiz Kaan Erdogmus (2384), Nurgyul Salimova (2332), Sabrican Onay Yontar (1870), Turkan Mamedjarova (2161), Atilla Kuru (1972), Evren Ucok (1400)	2388
14	Duobeniajan Costa Calida ESJ	José Carlos Ibarra Jeréz	Alan Pichot (2564), Jose Carlos Ibarra Jerez (2541), Jose Fernando Cuenca Jimenez (2459), Marcos Camacho Collados (2365), Bella Khotenashvili (2349), Lucas Torres (2031), Adhara Rodriguez Redondo (2121), Alexandra Aguilera Quiztke (1898)	2385
15	Global Ramblers	Denis Bilunov	Alexei Shirov (2707), Alexander Shabalov (2526), Konstantin Mesropov (2473), Gleb Dudin (2454), Anna Zatonskih (2255), Leonid Volkov (1833), Igor Glek (2416), Alexander Reprintsev (2299), Olga Badelka (2238)	2375
16	Hetman GKS Katowice	Grzegorz Masternak	David Navara (2671), Dinara Saduakassova (2449), Jan Klimkowski (2416), Jakub Seemann (2392), Jacek Gdanski (2333), Wojciech Smolinski (1929), Keti Tsatsalashvili (2254), Grzegorz Masternak (2225), Patryk Cieslak (2220)	2365
17	FIDE MB Team	Lukasz Turlej	Andrew Hong (2547), Nigel Short (2533), Victor Bologan (2501), Mohammed Al-Modiahki (2479), Zhu Chen (2312), Stepan Zaiarski (1764), Sava Stoisavljevic (2103), Lukasz Turlej (1992), Arkady Dvorkovich (1400)	2356
18	Barys.kz	Pavel Kotsur	Kazybek Nogerbek (2531), Denis Makhnev (2531), Anuar Ismagambetov (2466), Alisher Suleymenov (2428), Amina Kairbekova (2280), Suleiman Nurakyn (1880), Zhandos Agmanov (2388), Edgar Mamedov (2324), Xeniya Balabayeva (2270)	2353
19	Theme International Trading	Kevin Goh Wei Ming	Jose Martinez Alcantara (2665), Rinat Jumabayev (2524), Le Tuan Minh (2503), Tin Jingyao (2485), Gong Qianyun (2220), Zhang Changjie (1676), Siddharth Jagadeesh (2408), Kevin Goh Wei Ming (2355)	2346
20	e-therapeutics	Ali Mortazavi	Nicholas Pert (2600), Ilya Gurevich (2586), Simon Williams (2497), David Norwood (2494), Bodhana Sivanandan (2052), Sami Mortazavi (1714), Richard Pert (2447), Ali Mortazavi (2392), Max Pert (1940)	2324
21	Rookies	Yevgeniy Vladimirov	Read Samadov (2464), Roman Shogdzhiev (2405), Shreyas Royal (2372), Ergali Suleimen (2336), Alua Nurman (2250), Islam Aiten (2037), Daniyal Sapenov (2325), Imangali Akhilbay (2288), Zarina Nurgaliyeva (2081)	2290
22	Wood Green	Viktor Stoyanov	Marcus R Harvey (2460), Maciej Czopor (2382), Matthew Wadsworth (2367), Jonah B Willow (2322), Audrey Kueh (2098), Carmel Barwick (1915), Viktor Stoyanov (2174), Madara Orlovska (2095), Alaa Gamal (1754)	2257
23	Perfect	Valery Atlas	Gennadij Sagalchik (2434), Valery Atlas (2419), Boris A Zlotnik (2349), Ketevan Arakhamia-Grant (2267), Gennadie Slavin (2207), Valeriu Mindru (1840), Mark Gluhovsky (2136), Dmitry Atlas (2107), Daniel J Slavin (1400)	2255
24	ChessbrahTV	Miodrag Perunovic	Eric Hansen (2582), Dagur Ragnarsson (2350), Miodrag Perunovic (2297), Marta Garcia Martin (2262), Trevor Vincent (2226), Nikola Stojsin (1789), Killian Delaney (2177), Kameron Grose (1813)	2251
25	Sharks 4NCL	Ben J. Purton	Ameet Ghasi (2483), Thomas Rendle (2412), Peter T Roberson (2372), James Moreby (2210), Kamila Hryshchenko (2054), Georgiana-Steluta Morea (1929), Ben J Purton (2185), Kevin C McCarthy (1917)	2243
26	Mongolia-A	Gan-Od Sereenen	Turmunkh Munkhzul (2357), Ganzorig Amartuvshin (2356), Amilal Munkhdalai (2341), Gan-Od Sereenen (2294), Sumiya Chinguun (2271), Dondog Amarbat (1943), Uurtsaikh Uuriintuya (2239), Qixuan Han (1831)	2236
27	Sassy Seniors	Natasha Regan	Jonathan Parker (2506), Matthew Turner (2506), Stephen Dishman (2266), Chris R Duncan (2253), Natasha K Regan (1905), Matthew Dishman (1901), Rajko Vujatovic (2194), Dildarav Lishoy Gengis Paratazham (2035), Leela Widger (1400)	2223
28	Turkish Airlines Sports Club	Ozgur Solakoglu	Faustino Oro (2457), Khagan Ahmad (2301), Xu Yuanyuan (2251), Kerem Erten (2185), Sohum Lohia (2097), Ali Aras Yildiz (1835), Lu Miaoyi (2240), Indy Southcott-Moyers (2089), Ozgur Solakoglu (2024)	2212
29	Mongolia-B	Sumiya Bilguun	Sumiya Bilguun (2438), Sugaryn Gan-Erdene (2433), Batkhuyag Munguntuul (2291), Naranbold Sodbilegt (1946), Genden Enkhbayar (1837), Gombojav Zandanshatar (1400), Bat-Erdene Mungunzul (2285)	2205
30	Berlin Chess Federation	Bernhard Riess	Ilja Schneider (2429), Johannes Florstedt (2334), Marius Fromm (2320), Lara Schulze (2211), Michael Ziems (1890), Alina Rath (2038)	2204
31	Mother Continent	Goitsemodimo Makgatle	Fy Antenaina Rakotomaharo (2404), Harold Wanyama (2246), David George Samir (2234), Banele Mhango (2136), Deborah Ebimobo-ere Quickpen (2077), Philip Selikem Yao Amoako (1948), Fouzi Ali Alshalwi (1836), Aun O. A. Younis (1400)	2174
32	The MongolZ	Anu Bayar	Ritvars Reimanis (2331), Sumiya Chinguun (2271), Davaademberel Nomin-Erdene (2239), Khuyagtsogt Itgelt (2216), Khishigbat Ulziikhishig (2027), Cristian Araya Fuentes (1945), Anu Bayar (1927)	2172
33	Chess Rising Stars	Maria Manelidou	Lorin D'Costa (2378), Li Wu (2270), Rhys Cumming (2223), Andreea Navrotescu (2195), Zisis Tsaknakis (2130), Magdalini Mihailidou (1822), Christopher Russell (2082), Joel Bird (1927), Aden Kennedy (1806)	2170
34	Noval Group Kyrgyzstan	Sardarbek Nurdin uulu	Eldiyar Orozbaev (2376), Emir Sharshenbekov (2265), Aziz Degenbaev (2252), Erzhan Zhakshylykov (2235), Assel Lesbekova (2004), Aimonchok Zhunusbekova (1716), Nuriddin Iunusov (1947), Nurai Sovetbekova (1867), Elzarbek Tazhimyrzaev (1803)	2156
35	Wood Green Youth	Lawrence Cooper	Justin Tan (2403), David L Haydon (2292), Aaravamudhan Balaji (2278), Borna Derakhshani (2240), Nadia Jaufarally (1901), Elizabeth Ivanov (1763), Conor O'Donnell (2195), Frederick Waldhausen Gordon (2153), Imogen A L Camp (1805)	2153
36	¡Ållez-Y Initiative!	Susie Sun	Jonas Buhl Bjerre (2546), Annmarie Muetsch (2188), Mikkel Manosri Jacobsen (2169), Mikkel Vinh Loftgaard (2160), August Jalving (1893), Elliot McCallum (1831)	2131
37	English Knightmares	Frankie Badacsonyi	Daniel Howard Fernandez (2380), Stanley Badacsonyi (2316), Jude Shearsby (2090), Supratit Banerjee (2067), Mei-En Emmanuelle Hng (1994), Gautam Jain (1918), Frankie Badacsonyi (1947), George Ivanov (1819)	2128
38	Borsa Team	Bachferrag Mohamed	Bilel Bellahcene (2551), Adlane Arab (2412), Mohamed Anis Achour (2016), Lina Nassr (1963), Hatem Ould Rouis (1923), Ahmed Younsi (1400), Zakaria Ould Rouis (1740), Mohamed Metali (1400)	2101
39	OlalaStars	Dion Krivenko	Arthur Kogan (2455), Dion Krivenko (2221), Sofia Blokhin (2099), Noam Sason (2077), Yuri Agafonov (1987), Platon Kiritshenko (1732)	2095
40	ANI	Meri Grigoryan	David Zakarian (2277), Ari Kiremitciyan (2165), Henrik Stepanyan (2140), Dimitrios Levon Zakarian (2033), Meri Grigoryan (1908), Sebouh Takvorian (1681), Hayk Mesropyan (1932)	2076
41	Chess Trust Accelerators	John Emms	John M Emms (2415), Theo Khoury (2144), Oleg Verbytski (2090), Elis Denele Dicen (1982), Kushal Jakhria (1956), Arthur Kendall (1712), George Zhao (1939), Julia Volovich (1859), John Zhao (1400)	2074
42	Berlin Lasker Legends	Andre Kunz	Jonas Eilenberg (2279), Martin Yatskar (2223), Andre Kunz (2128), Ngoc Hai-Dang Ho (1981), Theodor Stein (1933), Rebekka Schuster (1874)	2070
43	Uppsala SSS	Vidar Grahn	Vidar Grahn (2201), Alexander Strom-Engdahl (2113), Anton Frank (2110), Oliver Nilsson (2043), Julia Ostensson (1966), Tim Letoret (1794), Edvin Morell (1882)	2053
44	Oxbridge	Cameron Jinghan Goh	Tom O'Gorman (2257), Ranesh Ratnesan (2143), Ashvin Sivakumar (2126), Daniel GH Gallagher (2063), Mei-Xian Eunice Hng (1848), Simona Nayberg (1833), Remy Rushbrooke (2055), Goh Cameron Jinghan (1992)	2045
45	The London Legends	Avyukt Dasgupta	Livio Cancedda-Dupuis (2203), Harry Bryant (2121), Avyukt Dasgupta (2083), Raman Vashisht-Pigem (2015), Sebastian Mokhber-Garcia (1921), Emily Maton (1827), Zain Patel (2001), Alexey M. Lapidus (1884), Sameera Kodukula (1662)	2028
46	Danish futures	Rasmus Skytte	Rasmus Skytte (2412), Nicolai Kistrup (2221), Ellen Fredericia Nilssen (2104), Robert Skytte (1846), Leia Andries (1708), Sarah Sima Derlich (1807)	2016
47	UK Chess Challenge Masters	Sarah Longson	Adithya Vaidyanathan (2147), Yu Rock (2091), Sarah N Longson (2045), Jan Murawski (1985), Zhu Pengxiao (1984), Zoe Veselow (1775), Adam Sefton (1730)	2005
48	Hammersmith Chess Club	Gaston Franco	Marco Gallana (2232), Thomas Villiers (2108), Alistair Hill (2095), Ashley Stewart (2056), Maria-Alexandra Ciocan (1924), Aryaman Ganguly (1604), Kai Hanache (2018), Gaston Franco (2010), Gesneria-Codruta Cepoi (1599)	2003
49	xChess.AI	Christiansen-Danut-Eugen Sava	Robert-Gabriel Sava (2132), Lucas Rusu (2130), Christiansen-Danut-Eugen Sava (1971), Matei-Andrei Badescu (1961), Luca Platschek (1827), Eliza-Ioana Badescu (1789)	1968
50	Satranc Istanbul	Tunahan Makaraci	Ataberk Eren (2195), Tunahan Makaraci (2151), Atakan Eken (2003), Ugur Barkin Tahaoglu (1959), Adnan Mesih Saygili (1692), Aleyna Demir (1591), Murat Emre Kalender (1755)	1942
51	Desert Penguins	Augustin Madan	Augustin Madan (2203), Mikhail Sedykh (2108), Rohan Bansal (1956), Saahil Bansal (1874), Yicheng Ding (1761), Yihua Ding (1536), Balahari Bharat Kumar (1790), Yiwen Ding (1704), Stakhey Sedykh (1694)	1911
52	REY AHOGADO	Carlos D. Schneider Sanchez	Jose Maria Medal Paves (1992), Carlos D. Schneider Sanchez (1980), Robert Kohlmann (1950), David Henriquez Garcia (1905), Anca-Claudia Cujba (1753), Ayraldo Dominguez Afonso (1748), Peter Heimbaecher (1771)	1892
53	Youth KG	Zhamila Aitbaeva	Ruslan Momunaliev (2070), Emir Beknazarov (1870), Zalkar Kurbanbaev (1848), Baiel Muradylov (1834), Aizhan Sezdbekova (1793), Iskender Mukanov (1600), Elim Keneshbekov (1832), Alika Baktybek Kyzy (1591), Timur Yrysov (1543)	1875
54	Equity Bank, Kenya	Moses Andiwoh	Arthur Ssegwanyi (2301), Patrick Kawuma (2218), Haruna Nsubuga (2154), Brian Gabriel Mwangi (1864), Jully Mutisya (1712), Kyle Kuka (1496), Njagi Kabugu (1695), Victor Ongono (1587)	1863

== Results ==
=== Rapid ===
Final Standings
Rank	Team	Matches	Points	TB1	TB2
1	Team MGD1	12	21	615	45.5
2	Hexamind Chess Team	12	20	642	47
3	Freedom	12	17	636	46.5
4	Uzbekistan	12	17	614	45.5
5	WR Chess Team	12	17	593.5	44.5
6	Germany and Friends	12	16	548	39.5
7	Duobeniajan Costa Calida ESJ	12	15	489.5	44.5
8	Generation XYZA	12	15	482	43
9	Malcolm's Mates	12	14	570.5	40.5
10	Ashdod Elit Chess Club	12	14	545.5	40.5

=== Blitz ===
Round 1
Malcolm's Mates	0
WR Chess Team	4
Germany and Friends	4
Hetman GKS Katowice	0
Generation XYZA	0
Team MGD1	4
Hexamind Chess Team	4
Knight Dance	0
FIDE MB Team	0
Freedom	4
KazChess	4
Rookies	2
Barys.kz	1
Uzbekistan	3
Ashdod Elit Chess Club	4
Theme International Trading	2

Quarterfinals
WR Chess Team	4
Germany and Friends	0
Team MGD1	1
Hexamind Chess Team	3
Freedom	2
KazChess	3
Uzbekistan	3
Ashdod Elit Chess Club	1

Semifinals
WR Chess Team	4
Hexamind Chess Team	0
KazChess	0
Uzbekistan	3

Final
WR Chess Team	4
KazChess	0
3rd Place
Hexamind Chess Team	3
Uzbekistan	0
