= Carrie Newcomer =

American singer, songwriter and author (born 1958)

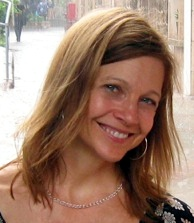

Background information
- Born: May 25, 1958 (age 68); Dowagiac, Michigan, United States
- Genres: Folk, Americana, World music
- Occupations: Singer-songwriter, musician, author
- Instruments: Guitar, vocal, mountain dulcimer
- Years active: 1980–present
- Labels: Philo, Rounder, Concord Music Group, Available Light Records
- Website: carrienewcomer.com

Carrie Newcomer (born May 25, 1958) is an American singer, songwriter and author. She has produced 19 solo CDs and has received numerous awards for her music and related charitable activities. She has collaborated with numerous authors, academics, philosophers and musicians. In 2009 and 2011 she traveled to India as a cultural ambassador, including musical performances organized by the US State Department. In 2012 she made a similar trip to Kenya on behalf of the Interfaith Hunger Initiative. Her range of causes, activities, collaborations and philosophies significantly influences her music. Newcomer was called "a prairie mystic" by The Boston Globe.

== Life and early career ==
Newcomer was born in Dowagiac, Michigan, on May 25, 1958, to James B. Newcomer and Donna Baldoni Newcomer. When she was five years old they moved to Elkhart, Indiana, where she lived until she was 18 years old. She began writing songs as a teenager and began performing in restaurants, coffeehouses and at benefits and festivals. She began her university studies at Ball State University and then Goshen College. Newcomer spent five months teaching art in an elementary school in San Isidro, Costa Rica. She completed her studies at Purdue University and received a B.A. in visual art and education.

In the 1980s, Newcomer was a member of the pop-folk and acoustic group Stone Soup, which produced three albums: Sampler (1982), Long Fields (1984), and October Nights (1987), all out of print. Newcomer was the group's main songwriter and lead vocalist, and she also played dulcimer and guitar. With her in the group were guitarist Larry Smeyak and percussionist Dennis Leas. The group was based in West Lafayette, Indiana. After leaving Stone Soup, she moved to Bloomington, Indiana, and recorded her first solo album.

== Solo music and career ==
Her first solo album was Visions and Dreams. Visions and Dreams was originally released on Windchime records and then later re-released with two additional tracks by Rounder records. Between 1993 and 2010, she released twelve additional albums and two "best of" compilations on Philo/Rounder. Her range of causes, activities, collaborations and philosophies significantly influences her music. She released four solo albums and one live album on Available Light Records.

Her album Betty's Diner: The Best of Carrie Newcomer was released in 2004. It contained three new songs, plus, "what's held up for me what songs have become old friends, and what songs are requested often". The title track started out as a short story which Newcomer wrote while on the road, she then decided to incorporate the story into a song.

In 2009 Newcomer traveled to India as a cultural ambassador for The American Center and worked with students of the American Embassy School in New Delhi. While in India, Newcomer performed concerts organized by the U.S. State Department including those in the cities of Chennai and Trivandrum. After the first week in Delhi, she embarked on a tour schedule that included concerts and performance in the evenings and working with community service groups during the days.

In 2011 Newcomer returned to India as a cultural ambassador for The American Center and worked with students of the American Embassy School in New Delhi, the American School Bombay, and The International School Chennai. While in India, Newcomer performed concerts organized by the U.S. State Department and visited community service projects and facilitated workshops.

In 2011, following her 2011 trip to India, she released the album, Everything is Everywhere, on Available Light Records which featured Amjad Ali Khan and his sons, Amaan and Ayaan on traditional Indian instruments. The profits of "Everything is Everywhere" benefit Interfaith Hunger Initiative In the article "Carrie Newcomer's cool fusion of East and West hooks listeners" Firstpost (Mumbai, India) identified Amjad Ali Khan and his sons, Amaan and Ayaan as "three of the best sarod players in the world". With the music in this collaboration album, Newcomer said that her objective was "to create songs that were based in western song form, but would integrate and preserve the power, depth and energy of Indian music. I did not want to create western songs, add a tabla and call it fusion."

Kindred Spirits: A Collection was released in November 2012. It includes two previously unreleased songs, two songs from her hunger benefit project (Everything is Everywhere) featuring Indian classical sarod performers Amjad Ali Khan, Ayaan and Amaan Ali Khan, two previously unreleased live recordings, and a compilation of other songs.

Her CD A Permeable Life was released in April 2014, as was her book of the same title. They do not have material in common, but Newcomer has indicated that the book shows some of the process and themes of her songwriting. The theme of the CD has been characterized as: "Newcomer explores familiar themes of being present, moving through thresholds in life and embracing each experience that comes your way".

Her Beautiful Not Yet album was released in 2016, with a companion book by the same name. Accorfing to Newcomer, this book and CD explore the themes of mystery and miracle in the everyday and the album is described by FolkWorks as "profound and poetic."

Newcomer's album Until Now was released in Sept 2021, with a companion book of the same title. This collection refers to the Covid pandemic as "the great unraveling" and addresses big questions for society's work in process, and that healing after the crisis is not enough. "We can't just be healed, we must be transformed."

In more recent years her broadening into authoring books including poetry and philosophical works, and similar collaborations have represented a transformation into what sources have termed a "prairie mystic." With the release of her latest album and companion book, one review summarized it as "Newcomer's lyrics address the themes of living in challenging and changing times and finding hope in the patterns of nature and each other's company. The lyrics are informed by Newcomer's wider philosophical and spiritual thinking as well as her environmentalism and concerns for social justice."

== Books ==
Newcomer has released three books of poetry, essays and short stories. 2014 A Permeable Life: Poems & Essays, in 2016 The Beautiful Not Yet: Poems & Lyrics, and in 2021 Until Now: New Poems. Newcomer's poem Three Gratitudes was featured on the On Being PBS radio program first aired on November 26, 2014, along with an interview of Newcomer by Krista Tippett.

== Podcast ==
Since 2017 Newcomer has co-hosted The Growing Edge podcast with author Parker J. Palmer described as "exploring the themes of life on the growing edge personally, vocationally and politically".

== Awards and recognitions ==
In 2012, Newcomer performed at various locations in rural Chulaimbo Kenya as a part of the Interfaith Hunger Initiative and at the AMPATH HIV center in Eldoret.

In December 2018, Spirituality and Health Magazine named Newcomer and Parker J. Palmer as two of 10 Spiritual Leaders for the Next 20 Years.

In 2010, Rich Warren, then-host of WFMT-FM's Midnight Special radio program, selected Newcomer as one of the 50 most significant singer-songwriters of folk music for the last 50 years. Warren also selected Geography of Light as one of his 13 favorite CDs for 2008. He said "Newcomer is philosopher, sage, mystic, and poet, with an alto voice that I would follow to the ends of the earth. She also finally reached the perfect balance of accompaniment/production with her voice. The thoroughly engrossing songs require several listenings to see all the light (and dark) within them. Newcomer improves with every CD and her poetry grows more complex and luminous."

In 2008, Boston's WUMB radio station, included her on their list of the Top Most Influential Artists of the past 25 years. In 2010 Chicago's WBEZ radio and The Chicago Tribune included her on their list of Top 50 folk artists of the last 50 years. In 2007, her album The Geography of Light won Album of the Year and she won Artist of the Year from Folk Wax Magazine. In 2003, The Gathering of Spirits received the Artist of the Year and Album of the Year awards from Folk Wax Magazine. That year she wrote the national theme song for the YMCA and collaborated with Scott Russell Sanders and folk songwriters Krista Detor, Tim Grimm, Michael White, and Tom Roznoski on an album and theatrical production entitled Wilderness Plots. The author, cast members and director of Wilderness Plots were honored by the Indiana House of Representatives and Senate in a joint resolution which described it as "a musical tribute to the early pioneer settlement of the Midwest and embodies the rich history and artistic excellence of the State of Indiana." Wilderness Plots received a 2012 CINE award for the professional telecast non-fiction division.

In 2003, Newcomer was named Woman of the Year by the City of Bloomington's Commission on the Status of Women. "The 2003 Woman of the Year, Carrie Newcomer, is best known as a singer/songwriter; however, Jennifer Bass, nominator, says Newcomer's significant contributions go beyond her music. Nine years ago, Newcomer and her husband Robert Meitus organized Bloomington's first Soup Bowl Benefit and they continue to assist with the benefit. What is less known is Carrie's dedication to community and her generous support of local and national organizations, said Bass. She has donated money from sales of her cds to the Nature Conservancy and she has participated in benefit concerts in St. Louis and Tucson." Newcomer's "I Wish I May, I Wish I Might" was chosen as the official song of the two year Food For Thought campaign by The Indiana Humanities Department. Newcomer added, "'I Wish I May, I Wish I Might' was inspired by the essays 'Carnival' and 'Bill and Bunny' by celebrated Indiana author Philip Gulley."

Rolling Stone magazine said that Newcomer's work "asks all the right questions and refuses to settle for easy answers".

In 2016 Newcomer was presented an honorary degree by Goshen College in Music for Social Change. The same year she presented the commencement address for the Goshen College class of 2016.

In 2003 her song "I Should've Known Better" was recorded by Nickel Creek on their Grammy-winning Best Contemporary Folk Album This Side.

== Collaborations ==
Newcomer has collaborated with a range of musicians in performances and recordings. She also has collaborated on performances, presentations and efforts with authors, academics, activists, and organizations.

Newcomer has collaborated with author Parker J. Palmer on a number of projects including a song-and-spoken-word event called Healing the Heart of Democracy: A Gathering of Spirits for the Common Good and We Need it Here: Hope, Hard Times and Human Possibility. In 2017 Newcomer and Palmer created a collaboration called The Growing Edge which includes retreats and The Growing Edge podcast.

In 1989, she wrote Sounds of the Morning for The Battle of Tippecanoe Outdoor Drama, about the land conflict between Tecumseh and William Henry Harrison. Her song was played as a prologue and as patrons left the amphitheater. Her music was woven into the NEA-funded sound design by theatre sound designer Richard K. Thomas.

Newcomer collaborated with author Parker J. Palmer to create the presentation "Healing the Heart of Democracy."

"Transforming Stories" was a presentation by Newcomer and Dr. Jill Bolte Taylor a neuroanatomist and author of the book My Stroke of Insight.

Newcomer also collaborated with authors Scott Russell Sanders, Philip Gulley and J. Brent Bill for the PBS special Festival of Friends: An Offering in 4 Quaker Voices.

Newcomer has collaborated with Jim Wallis. Jim Wallis is the author of the New York Times best-selling book God's Politics: Why the Right Gets It Wrong and the Left Doesn't Get It,

Newcomer has toured the United States, Europe, Africa and India including performances with Alison Krauss, Mary Chapin Carpenter, American singer-songwriter David Wilcox in shows based on spiritual story, Amjad Ali Khan, Barbara Kingsolver, Parker J. Palmer, Jill Bolte Taylor, Scott Russell Sanders and Philip Gulley.

In September 2012, the collaboration An Evening of Reflection, Conversation & Song: Taylor, Newcomer, and Sasso was hosted by the Athenaeum Foundation. It included Newcomer, Sandy Sasso and Jill Bolte Taylor with the objective of providing stories and music exploring the ideas in Parker J. Palmer's book "Healing the Heart of Democracy' for those in search of ideas on how to "Reclaim our capacity for civility and community".

Her albums also contain collaborations with a range of other musicians.

== Organizations and causes ==
Newcomer is a member of the National Advisory board of the Buechner institute of King college.

Newcomer gives a percentage of her album sales to charitable organizations including the Interfaith Hunger Initiative American Friends Service Committee, America's Second Harvest, The Center for Courage and Renewal, and Literacy Volunteers of America.

== Personal life ==
Though she was raised in a Protestant-Methodist Church, she is now a Quaker. She is married to Robert Shannon Meitus, an entertainment and intellectual property lawyer. When she met him he was a guitar player and songwriter in the band Dorkestra. She has a daughter. Newcomer's musical development, approach and themes have been influenced by her evolution in spiritual, philosophical and humanitarian areas and endeavors.

== Published works ==
=== Solo CDs ===
- 2023 A Great Wild Mercy
- 2021 Until Now
- 2019 The Point of Arrival
- 2017 Live at the Buskirk-Chumley Theater
- 2016 The Beautiful Not Yet
- 2014 A Permeable Life
- 2012 Kindred Spirits: A collection
- 2011 Everything Is Everywhere Available Light Records AL 1001
- 2010 Before & After – Philo PH 1259
- 2008 The Geography of Light – Philo PH 1253
- 2005 Regulars and Refugees – Philo PH 1247
- 2004 Betty's Diner: The Best of Carrie Newcomer – Philo PH 1245
- 2002 The Gathering of Spirits – Philo PH 1243
- 2000 The Age of Possibility – Philo PH 1226
- 1999 Bare to the Bone [Live] – Philo CD 9901
- 1998 My True Name – Philo PH 1223
- 1996 My Father's Only Son – Philo PH 1203
- 1995 The Bird or the Wing – Philo PH 1183
- 1994 An Angel at My Shoulder – Philo PH 1163
- 1991 Visions and Dreams – Philo PH 1193 [1995 reissue]

=== Collaboration CDs ===
- 2008 Kyser Klassics (Partial Capo)
- 2007 Wilderness Plots Rosehill Records
- 2003 Song Mania (More Songs About Love and Despair)
- 2002 The Singer Songwriter Collection Rounder Records
- 2001 Rounder Records: Celebrating 30 Colorful Years [Compilation, Limited Edition]
- 1998 Kerrville Folk Festival: 25th Anniversary
- 1996 One More Song:An Album For Club Passim Rounder Records
- 1993 Shelter: The Best Of Contemporary Singer-Songwriters Putumayo Presents Series

=== DVDs ===
- 2016 An Evening with Carrie Newcomer WFYI Public Television Broadcast
- 2008 Wilderness Plots Songs and Stories of the Prairie
- 2006 Bernice Johnson Reagon/Holly Near/Carrie Newcomer : Light of Change DVD
- 2005 A Festival of Friends WFYI Public Television Broadcast

=== Books ===
- 2021 Until Now:New Poems by Carrie Newcomer ISBN 978-1-7375335-0-4
- 2016 Carrie Newcomer the beautiful not yet Poems, Essays and Lyrics ISBN 978-0-692-76090-1
- 2014 A Permeable Life by Carrie Newcomer ISBN 978-0-615-90275-3

=== LPs With Stone Soup ===
- 1987 October Nights – Windchime RC-102
- 1984 Long Fields – Windchime RC-101/S
