= Czerwoński =

Czerwoński (feminine: Czerwońska) is a Polish surname. May refer to:

- Aleksander Czerwoński (born 1965), Polish chess International Master
- Beata Ziętek-Czerwońska
- Erich Czerwonski (1889–1940), German art director
