= Masternak =

Masternak is a Polish surname. Notable people with the surname include:

- Grzegorz Masternak (born 1970), Polish chess master
- Mateusz Masternak (born 1987), Polish professional boxer
