= Mladen Muše =

Croatian chess grandmaster (born 1963)

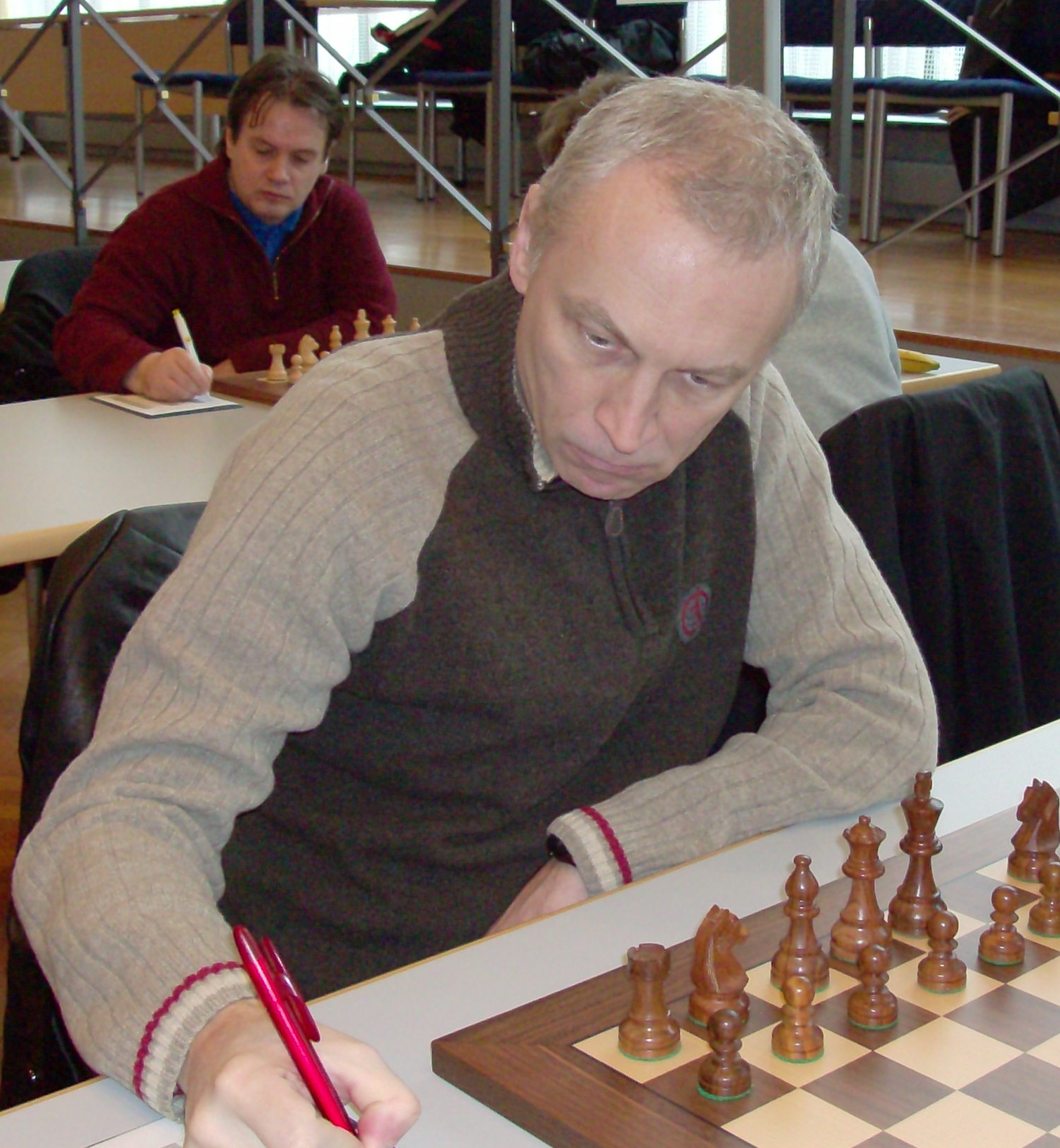
- Mladen Muše in 2010

Personal information
- Born: 20 January 1963 (age 63) Bjelovar, Croatia

Chess career
- Country: Germany (until 2006); Croatia (since 2006)
- Title: Grandmaster (2001)
- Peak rating: 2510 (July 2000)

Mladen Muše (born 20 January 1963) is a German (before 2006) and Croatian chess Grandmaster (2001).

== Chess career ==
In 1982, Muše won the bronze medal in the Federal Republic of Germany Junior Chess Championship in U20 age group in Dortmund. In 1985, 1987 and 1989 he won three Berlin City Chess Championships. Muše competed several times in the individual finals of the German Chess Championship, achieving his greatest success in 1991 in Bad Neuenahr-Ahrweiler, where he took 4th place (behind Vlastimil Hort, Jörg Hickl and Wolfgang Uhlmann). In 1999, he won the German Blitz Chess Championship.

Muše's individual successes in international chess tournaments include:

- 1st place in Teslić (1987),
- 1st place in Budapest (1990),
- 1st place in Altensteig (1993),
- shared 2nd place in Vinkovci (1993, after Iván Faragó, together with Ognjen Cvitan, Krunoslav Hulak, Vlatko Kovačević and Gyula Sax),
- shared 1st place in Barlinek (1997, memorial of Emanuel Lasker, together with Marek Oliwa, Aleksander Czerwoński and Andrei Maksimenko),
- shared 1st place in Wemding (1998, together with, among others, Alexei Barsov and Rainer Polzin),
- shared 1st place in Berlin (1999, together with Roman Slobodjan, Peter Wells and Edvīns Ķeņģis),
- 1st place in Split (2000),
- shared 1st place in Travemünde (2003, together with, among others, Paweł Jaracz, Normunds Miezis and Sergey Kalinitschew).

Muše achieved the highest rating in his career so far on 1 July 2000, with a score of 2510 points, he was then 27th -28th place among German chess players.
