= Kenya Open Chess Championship =

Annual chess tournament in Kenya

The Kenya Open Chess Championship is an annual open chess tournament played in most editions in Nairobi, Kenya. The inaugural event was played in 1979 and was won by Richard Polaczek. The event is usually organized by the Chess Kenya federation.

The event is the largest and most lucrative international tournament in Africa. The tournament was originally known as the Panpaper Open sponsored by Panafrican Paper Mills (EA) Limited until the early 90s. The tournament is usually played over the Easter Holiday weekend in April.

The 2023 edition had a prize fund of USD 43,000 (approximately KES 5.5 million) and had 445 players from 20 federations participating, including seven grandmasters. It was at this edition that Stanley Omondi dressed in a burqa and entered the women's tournament under the name Millicent Awour. Chess Kenya president Bernard Wanjala called this type of fraud the first of its kind.

== Winners ==
All players finishing equal first are listed; the winners after tie-breaks are boldfaced.

#	Year	Open Category	Ladies Category
1	1979	**Richard Polaczek** (Belgium)	
2	1980	**Saifudin Kanani** (Canada)	
3	1981	**Aslam Adam** (Kenya)	
27	2016	**Ben Nguku** (Kenya); Mehul Gohil (Kenya)	**Triza Mwendwa** (Kenya)
28	2018	**Harold Wanyama** (Uganda)	**Joyce Nyaruai** (Kenya)
29	2019	**Joseph Methu** (Kenya)	**Joyce Nyaruai** (Kenya)
30	2022	**Harold Wanyama** (Uganda); James Panchol (South Sudan); Haruna Nsubuga (Uganda); Emmanuel Egesa (Uganda)	**Triza Mwendwa** (Kenya)
31	2023	**Timur Gareyev** (USA)	**Josefine Heinemann** (Germany)
