= British Rapidplay Chess Championships =

The British Rapidplay Chess Championships is a rapidplay chess tournament held since 1986 under the auspices of the English Chess Federation.

The tournament typically takes place over a single weekend and consists of 11 rounds of chess. The 4NCL took over the organisation of the event from 2023.

== British Rapidplay Chess Champions ==
Year	City	Champion	Women's Champion
1986		Nigel Short	
1987		Nigel Davies	
1988		Murray Chandler; Glenn Flear; Julian Hodgson; John Nunn	
1989		John Nunn	
1990		Mark Hebden; Julian Hodgson; Jon Speelman; Alexander Wojtkiewicz	
1991		Lev Polugaevsky; Jon Speelman	
1992		William Watson	
1993	No contest		
1994		Mark Hebden	
1995		Michael Adams	
1996		Michael Adams	
1997		Stuart Conquest	
1998		Keith Arkell	
1999		Michael Adams	
2000		Aaron Summerscale; Ameet Ghasi	
2001		Mark Hebden	
2002		Peter Wells	
2003		Peter Wells	
2004		Nicholas Pert	
2005		Mark Hebden	
2006		Danny Gormally; Richard Palliser	
2007	Halifax	Peter Wells	
2008	Halifax	David Howell	
2009	Halifax	David Howell; Mark Hebden	
2010	Halifax	David Howell (10.5/11)	
2011	Leeds	Gawain Jones (10.5/11)	
2012	Leeds	Jonathan Hawkins (9.0/11)	
2013	Leeds	Mark Hebden (9.5/11)	
2014	Leeds	Jonathan Hawkins (10.5/11)	
2015	Leeds	Ameet Ghasi; Mark Hebden	
2016	Leeds	Lorin D'Costa (9.0/11); Richard Bates (9.0/11)	
2017	Bradford	Daniel Alsina Leal (8.0/10)	
2018	Bradford	Gediminas Sarakauskas (9.5/11)	
2019	Leeds	Stephen Gordon (8.5/11); David Eggleston (8.5/11)	
2020–2022	No contest		
2023	Bradford	Ameet Ghasi	
2024	Peterborough	Daniel Gormally	Trisha Kanyamarala
2025	Peterborough	Nikita Vitiugov	Elmira Mirzayeva
2026	Peterborough	Frederick Waldhausen Gordon	Trisha Kanyamarala

== See also ==
- British Chess Championship
