= Michał Matuszewski =

Polish chess grandmaster (born 1993)

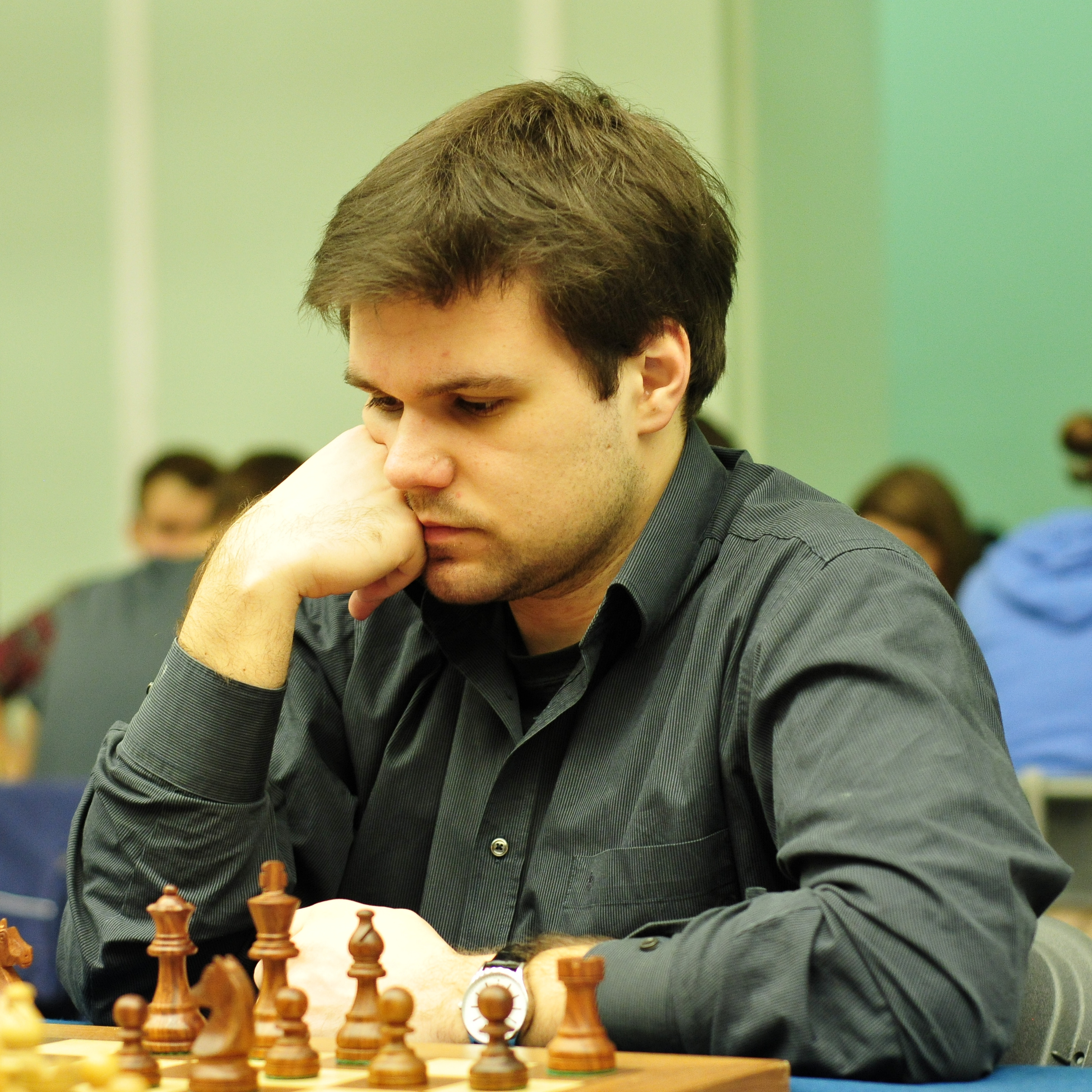
- Matuszewski in 2013

Personal information
- Born: January 6, 1993 (age 33) Warsaw, Poland

Chess career
- Country: Poland
- Title: Grandmaster (2019)
- FIDE rating: 2474 (July 2026)
- Peak rating: 2524 (October 2019)

Michał Matuszewski (born January 6, 1993) is a Polish chess grandmaster.

== Chess career ==
He achieved his GM norms at the:

- Polish Team Chess Championships Extraliga in May 2014
- Druzynowe Mistrzostwa Polski Ekstraliga in May 2017
- Druzynowe Mistrzostwa Polski Ekstraliga in June 2018

In May 2011, he was the best performing junior at the King's Gambit tournament in Radom, finishing 4th overall.

In September 2011, he finished tied for second place with Bogdan Lalić at the 4th Jessie Gilbert International Tournament.

In March 2015, he played for the TS Wisła Kraków chess club in the Polish Individual Championships.
