= Kyle Kuka =

Kenyan chess player (born 2010)

Personal information
- Born: 2010 (age 15–16) Nairobi, Kenya

Chess career
- Country: Kenya
- Peak rating: 2035 (June 2026)

Kyle Kuka is a Kenyan chess player.

== Chess career ==
In June 2025, he played for Team Equity Bank in the World Rapid and Blitz Team Chess Championships 2025, where he scored 6.5/12 across his rapid games.

In December 2025, he finished in second place at the Kenyan Chess Championship, scoring 7.5/11. Afterwards, he began training at the Elite Training Camp in New York City under grandmaster Aleksandr Lenderman.

In September 2026, he played for Kenya on the top board in the 46th Chess Olympiad, where he notably held draws against 2300+ rated players Christopher Leonel Garzon Zapatanga and Chitumbo Mwali.
