= Keith Arkell =

English chess grandmaster (born 1961)

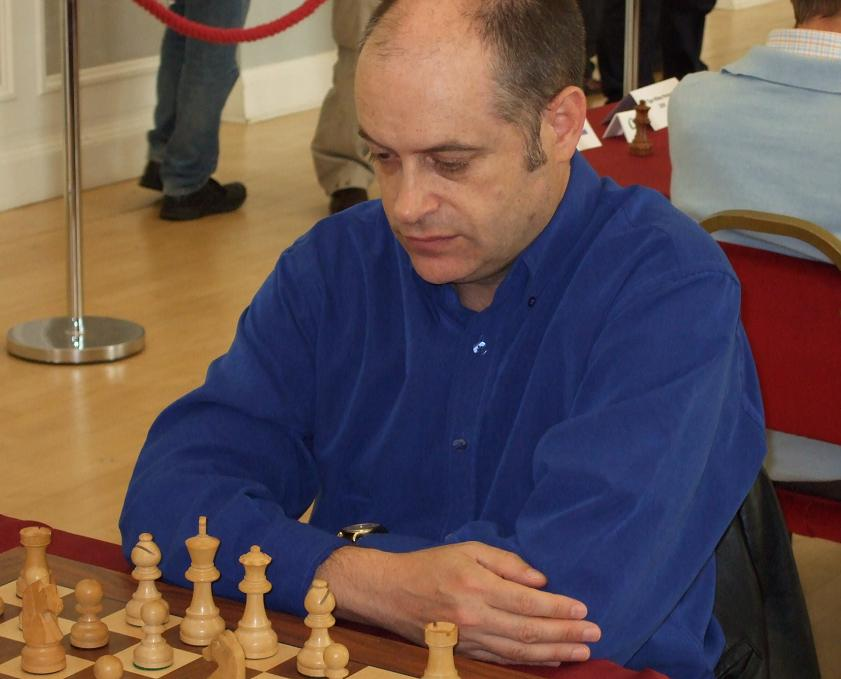

Personal information
- Born: Keith Charles Arkell; 8 January 1961 (age 65) Birmingham, England
- Spouse: Susan Walker (m. 1986; div. 1993)

Chess career
- Country: England
- Title: Grandmaster (1995)
- Peak rating: 2545 (July 1996)

Keith Charles Arkell (born 8 January 1961) is an English chess grandmaster.

He won the English Chess Championship in 2008. In 2014 he was European Senior (50+) Champion, and, later in the year, tied for first in the World Senior (50+) Championship, but received the silver medal on tie-break.

== Chess career ==
Arkell was born in Birmingham, and learned to play chess aged 13. His brother Nicholas was also a strong player.

FIDE awarded Arkell the title of International Master in 1985, and he became a Grandmaster ten years later, after gaining norms at Ostend 1990, Parthenay 1993 and at the final leg of the French League Championship in 1995. He was the 1998 British Rapidplay Chess Champion, having recorded his peak Elo rating of 2545 just two years earlier.

In the early part of the 2000s, before taking a break from serious chess, he showed that he could perform consistently at a high level; he tied for second place at the 2001 British Chess Championship, tied for second at the strong Hastings Premier of 2002/3, took first place at the Wroxham Masters (2002) and tied for second at Montpellier (2002). At Gausdal (2002), he beat GMs Stelios Halkias, Vasilios Kotronias and rising star Magnus Carlsen, to finish joint fourth, only a half point off the shared first to third places. His achievements were recognised when he was voted third (2002) and second (2003) in the British Chess Federation's Player of the Year awards.

In subsequent years he focused his chess play on the weekend congress circuit, rather than competing in overseas tournaments. However, he then bucked the trend in 2007 and 2008 by touring the USA. His itinerary included the Foxwoods Open in Connecticut, where he finished on 6/9, a point behind winner Alexander Shabalov. He also won tournaments, shared or outright, at the famous Marshall Chess Club in Manhattan, at Saratoga Springs, and at the Blackstone Open, near Boston. Another trip took him to Barbados, where he finished runner-up in the Heroes Day Cup with a score of 7½/9. The tournament was claimed by the organiser to be the strongest ever held in the English speaking nations of the Caribbean.

Also in 2008, he tied for first place at the British Championship with GM Stuart Conquest, but lost the overall title after a two-game speed chess play-off. His final standing did however qualify him for the title of 'English Champion'. Later that year, he won the Wellington College International Open with 7½/9, ahead of GM Nick Pert (7/9).

In 2012 Arkell’s Odyssey, an autobiography, was published by Keverel Chess Books.

Arkell won the 2014 European Senior Chess Championship in Porto. It was the first year the championship had been split into two separate age categories; 50 years plus and 65 years plus. He won the former and was later voted the English Chess Federation's Player of the Year for 2014.

Arkell shared first at the 2014 World Senior (50+) Championship, in Katerini, with 8.5/11 losing on tiebreak to Zurab Sturua.

In 2015 Arkell finished equal first in the Vienna Open, scoring 7.5/9 in a field of 465 players, 138 of whom were titled. He received second prize on tie-break.

Arkell won the 2021 British online Championship with 7.5/9, a point ahead of runners up Michael Adams and Bogdan Lalic.

In 2022 England won the World Senior (50+) Team Championship, and such was its dominance that four of its five team members, Michael Adams, Nigel Short, Mark Hebden and Arkell himself won gold medals for the best performance on each of their respective boards. https://fide.com/news/1839 Later that year the team won the European title, with Arkell again collecting the gold medal for his board 2 performance. https://en.chessbase.com/post/european-senior-team-championships-2022-report

In 2020, he authored a second book, Arkell's Endings (published by GingerGM).

== Playing style ==
As White, Arkell prefers Queen Pawn openings. As Black, he usually meets 1.d4 with the Nimzo-Indian Defence and 1.e4 with the Caro–Kann Defence or French Defence. When playing the Caro-Kann, he is one of very few Grandmasters who regularly adopt the line 1.e4 c6 2.d4 d5 3.e5 c5!? (Botvinnik–Carls Defence). The leading chess magazine New in Chess christened this variation the "Arkell–Khenkin Line". In his 1994 book Beating the Caro-Kann, Greek Grandmaster Vassilios Kotronias refers to this line simply as the "3 ... c5 variation" but uses three of Arkell's games (and one from Botvinnik) as illustrative examples.

He is widely considered to have exceptional skills in the endgame. In an interview in 2009 with Streatham and Brixton Chess Club, Arkell suggests that the great precision required in long, exacting wins by players such as Ulf Andersson and Anatoly Karpov is the highest art form in chess and that for many years it never occurred to him that the majority of players would not share his enthusiasm. In the same interview, he laments that a reputation for keeping a tight rein on games and grinding out wins on the UK weekend circuit to support an existence as a professional chess player has negatively influenced coverage of his achievements by chess journalists and harmed his chances of selection for the England national team by overshadowing his record in international events.

== Personal life ==
Arkell was married to Woman Grandmaster and International Master Susan Lalic (née Walker) from 1986 to 1993.
