= Bogdan Lalić =

Croatian chess grandmaster (born 1964)

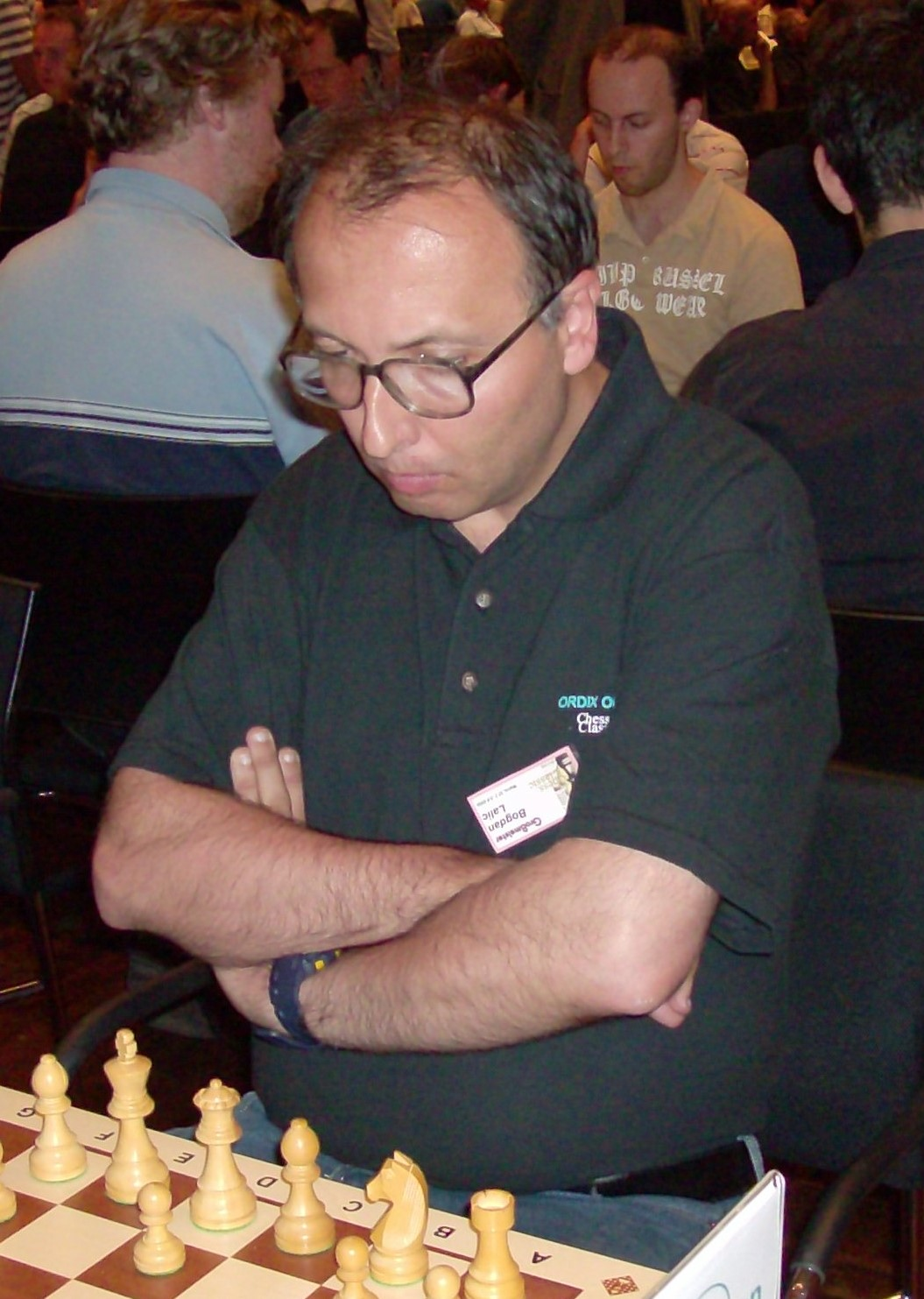
- Lalic in 2009

Personal information
- Born: 8 March 1964 (age 62) Zagreb, Yugoslavia (now Croatia)
- Spouse: Susan Walker (divorced)

Chess career
- Country: Croatia
- Title: Grandmaster (1988)
- Peak rating: 2600 (July 1997)

Bogdan Lalić (born 8 March 1964) is a Croatian chess grandmaster. He held the record for the longest unbeaten streak in FIDE-rated classical chess, with 155 games, until GM Zhou Jianchao surpassed it in 2026.

He was born in Zagreb, Yugoslavia (now Croatia), in 1964. FIDE awarded him the International Master title in 1985, and the Grandmaster title in 1988.

== Notable achievements ==
- finished equal first at the GM Closed Pleven 1987 and GM Closed Sarajevo 1988 tournaments
- 1987: shared 1–3 I Ciudad de Badajoz Open, the winner on Bucholz
- 1987: winner of Avignon (Championnat France Rapidplay)
- 1987: winner of 12th Aubervilliers Rapidplay (Paris)
- 1988: winner of XVII Ciudad de Sevilla Open
- 1988: shared 1st place in Berlin Sommer Open
- 1991: shared 1st to 3rd place in Neu Isenburg Open (with GMs Eric Lobron and Alexander Chernin)
- 1994: shared 1–2 (the winner on Bucholz) with GM Branko Damljanović in IV Paz de Ziganda Memorial Rapidplay (Pamplona)
- 1994: winner of Port Erin Open
- 1994: shared 1–2nd in XIV Benasque Open but 2nd place due to worse Bucholz (the winner was GM Lev Psakhis)
- 1995: winner of Chess Classic Frankfurt West Schnellschach
- 1995–1996: shared 1st–3rd in Hastings Premier (together with GMs Alexander Khalifman and Stuart Conquest)
- 1999: shared 1st–2nd in Kilkenny Masters (together with GM Julian Hodgson but the winner on Bucholz)
- 2000: winner of II Memorial Pedro Zabala (Bilbao Rapidplay)
- 2000: winner of III Memorial Zuri Baltza (Bilbao Rapidplay)
- 2001: shared 1st–4th (2nd place on Bucholz, the winner was GM Evgenij Agrest) in XXXI Rilton Cup
- 2002: winner of Redbus KO tournament Southend
- 2003: 2nd in British Championship Rapidplay
- 2008: shared 1st–2nd at Cork Masters (the winner was GM Dejan Bojkov)
- 2008: shared 1st–3rd in the Open Neuchatel (with GMs Mark Hebden and Aloyzas Kveinys) – the winner on Bucholz
- 2010: winner of 6th Tabor Open
- 2012: shared 2nd–7th in 30th Ville de Metz Open tournament
- 2012: shared 1st–2nd place Pardubice Rapidplay together with GM Rainer Buhmann (the winner on Bucholz)
- September 2012: winner of the closed GM tournament First Saturday in Budapest
- 2013: shared 1st–3rd (with GMs Azer Mirzoev and Alexei Barsov), the winner on Bucholz in Jaen IM closed tournament
- 2013: winner of XVII Torneo scacchi Cesenatico 2013
- 2016: shared 1st at 12th Tabor Open (the winner on Bucholz)

He achieved his highest rating of 2600 in 1997. Although registered with the Croatian Federation, he divides his time between playing abroad and making frequent visits to England. He was once married to International Master Susan Lalic, England's first woman to hold the IM title, but they are now divorced. Together, they have a son, Peter Lalić, born 1994, who is also a strong chess player.

Lalic and Sergei Tiviakov both claim to have played a record 110 consecutive tournament games at classical time controls without losing, although neither player faced exclusively elite-level opponents during their unbeaten streaks. Lalic's streak occurred between 5 June 2006 and 3 March 2007.

== Notable games ==
1) Bogdan Lalic – Alexei Shirov; Moscow Olympiad 1994 (0.5 – 0.5)

2) Bogdan Lalic – Judit Polgar; Yerevan Olympiad 1996 (1–0)

3) Alexei Shirov – Bogdan Lalic; Yerevan Olympiad 1996 (0–1)

4) Bogdan Lalic – Tony Miles; Hastings Premier 1995/1996 (1–0)

5) Bogdan Lalic – Krunoslav Hulak; Cro Cup (tt) 1996 (1–0)

6) Aleksej Aleksandrov – Bogdan Lalic; Pula EU ch. Teams 1997 (0–1)

7) Bogdan Lalic – Michał Krasenkow; Neum (tt) 2000 (1–0)

8) Bogdan Lalic – Evgeny Vorobiov; Cappelle la Grande 2012 (1–0)

9) Bogdan Lalic – Yaroslav Zherebukh; Cappelle la Grande 2012 (1–0)

10) Bogdan Lalic – Matthieu Cornette; Metz open 2012 (0.5 – 0.5)

11) Artyom Timofeev – Bogdan Lalic; Cappelle la Grande 2013 (0–1)

12) Richard Bates – Bogdan Lalic; Bunratty Masters 2019 (0–1)

== Books ==
- Bogdan Lalic (1997). The Queen's Indian Defence. Everyman Chess. ISBN 9781857441574.
- Bogdan Lalic (1998). The Budapest Gambit. Batsford. ISBN 9780713484564.
- Bogdan Lalic (2000). Queen's Gambit Declined: Bg5 Systems. Everyman Chess. ISBN 9781857442403.
- Bogdan Lalic (2001). Classical Nimzo-Indian: The ever-popular 4. Qc2. Everyman Chess. ISBN 1857442628.
- Bogdan Lalic (2002). The Grunfeld for the Attacking Player. Batsford. ISBN 9780713481662.
- Bogdan Lalic (2003). The Marshall Attack. Everyman Chess. ISBN 9781857442441.
- Bogdan Lalic, Vladimir Okhotnik, Carpathian Warrior (Caissa Hungary, 2005)
- Bogdan Lalic, Vladimir Okhotnik, Carpathian Warrior 2 (Pandora Press, 2008)
