= Marek Oliwa =

Polish chess player (born 1974)

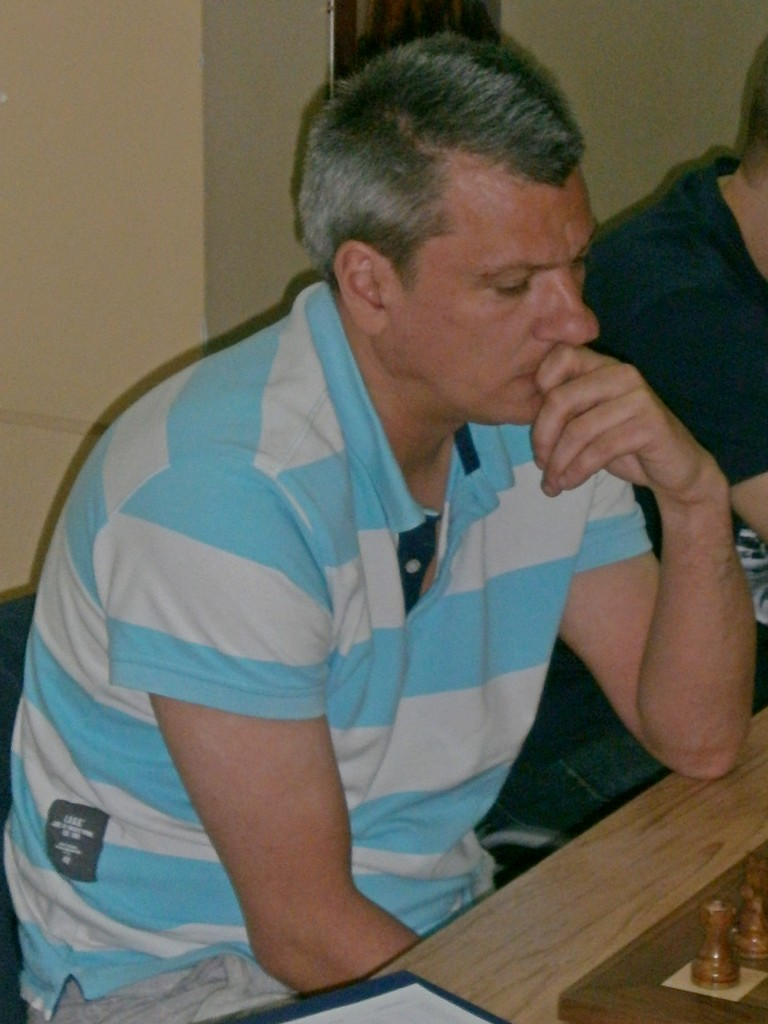
- Marek Oliwa in 2013

Personal information
- Born: 28 August 1974 (age 51) Sulechów, Poland

Chess career
- Country: Poland
- Peak rating: 2440 (January 1996)

Marek Oliwa (born 28 August 1974) is a Polish chess player.

== Chess career ==
Marek Oliwa won medals twice in the Polish Youth Chess Championships in U20 age group: silver (Częstochowa 1992) and gold (Warsaw 1994; ahead of, among others, Marcin Kamiński, Bartłomiej Macieja and Bartosz Soćko). In addition, he was a two-time medalist of Polish Blitz Chess Championship: silver (1996, Łuków) and bronze (1998, Kędzierzyn-Koźle). Marek Oliwa twice appeared in the men's Polish Chess Championship finals (1995-1996), achieving the best result in 1995 in Warsaw, where he ranked in 11th place. Marek Oliwa six times participated in Polish Team Chess Championship (1994, 1996–1997, 2009, 2011, 2013) and won individual gold medal with chess club ZPD Technolog Jasień in 1996.

In 1995, Marek Oliwa won the Swiss-system tournament in Bytom (against Grzegorz Masternak and Łukasz Cyborowski). In the following year, he shared the 1st place (ahead of, among others, Stellan Brynell, Jacek Gdański and Emanuel Berg) in the next open in Gothenburg. In 1997, he won (together with Andrei Maksimenko, Aleksander Czerwoński and Mladen Muše) in the Emanuel Lasker memorial in Barlinek. In 2002 Marek Oliwa triumphed in Przełazy, in 2005 - in Świebodzin, and in 2007 - in Lubawka. In 2008 he took second place (behind Łukasz Cyborowski) in Przełazy.

Marek Oliwa achieved the highest rating in his career on January 1, 1996, with a score of 2440 points, he was ranked 13th among Polish chess players.
