= Susan Lalic =

English chess player (born 1965)

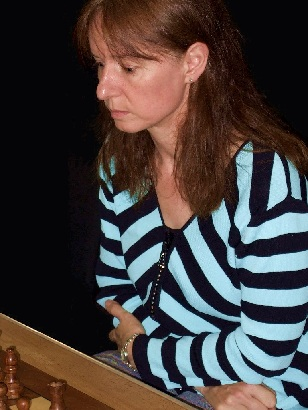
- Lalic at Sheffield, 2011

Personal information
- Born: Susan Kathryn Walker; 28 October 1965 (age 60) Chatham, Kent, England
- Spouses: Keith Arkell (m. 1986; div. 1993) Bogdan Lalić (divorced) Graeme Buckley (m. 2000)
- Family: PinkPantheress (niece)

Chess career
- Country: England
- Title: International Master (1996); Woman Grandmaster (1989)
- Peak rating: 2405 (January 1997)

Susan Kathryn Lalic (née Walker; born 28 October 1965) is an English chess player, holding both International Master (IM) and Woman Grandmaster (WGM) titles. She is five-time British Women's Chess Champion: 1986, 1990–1992, and 1998.

== Personal life ==
Lalic is the aunt of musician PinkPantheress.

== Career ==
Lalic has played for England nine times in Chess Olympiads, from 1984 to 2000, inclusive. From 1986 to 1998, she played on the top board.

She was the Fifth Women's Commonwealth Champion in 1987, the contest having been incorporated into the Lloyd's Bank Congress of that year.

Lalic was educated at Nonsuch High School for Girls from 1977 to 1984, and was married to Keith Arkell and then to Bogdan Lalić. Currently she is married to International Master Graeme Buckley.

== See also ==
- List of female chess players
