= Beata Zawadzka =

Polish chess player (born 1986)

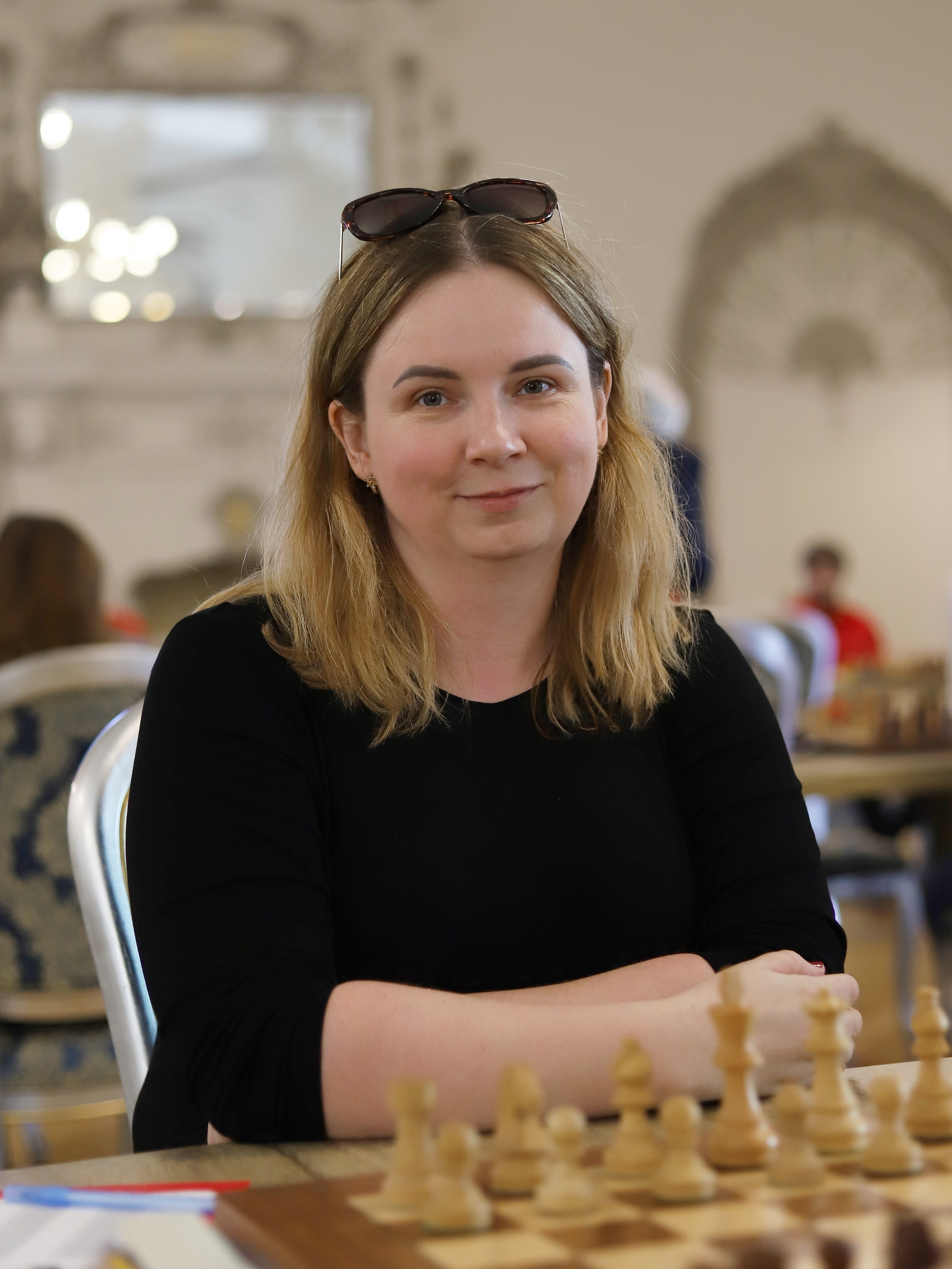
- Beata Zawadzka (2021)

Personal information
- Born: Beata Kądziołka; 26 June 1986 (age 40) Warsaw, Poland
- Spouse: Stanisław Zawadzki (m. 2014)

Chess career
- Country: Poland
- Title: Woman Grandmaster (2006)
- FIDE rating: 2329 (November 2021)
- Peak rating: 2381 (January 2006)

Beata Zawadzka (born 26 June 1986 in Warsaw) is a Polish chess player. She won the bronze medal with the Polish team at the 35th Chess Olympiad in 2002.

== Private life ==
In July 2014, she married International Master Stanisław Zawadzki.
