= Andrei Maksimenko =

Ukrainian chess grandmaster (born 1969)

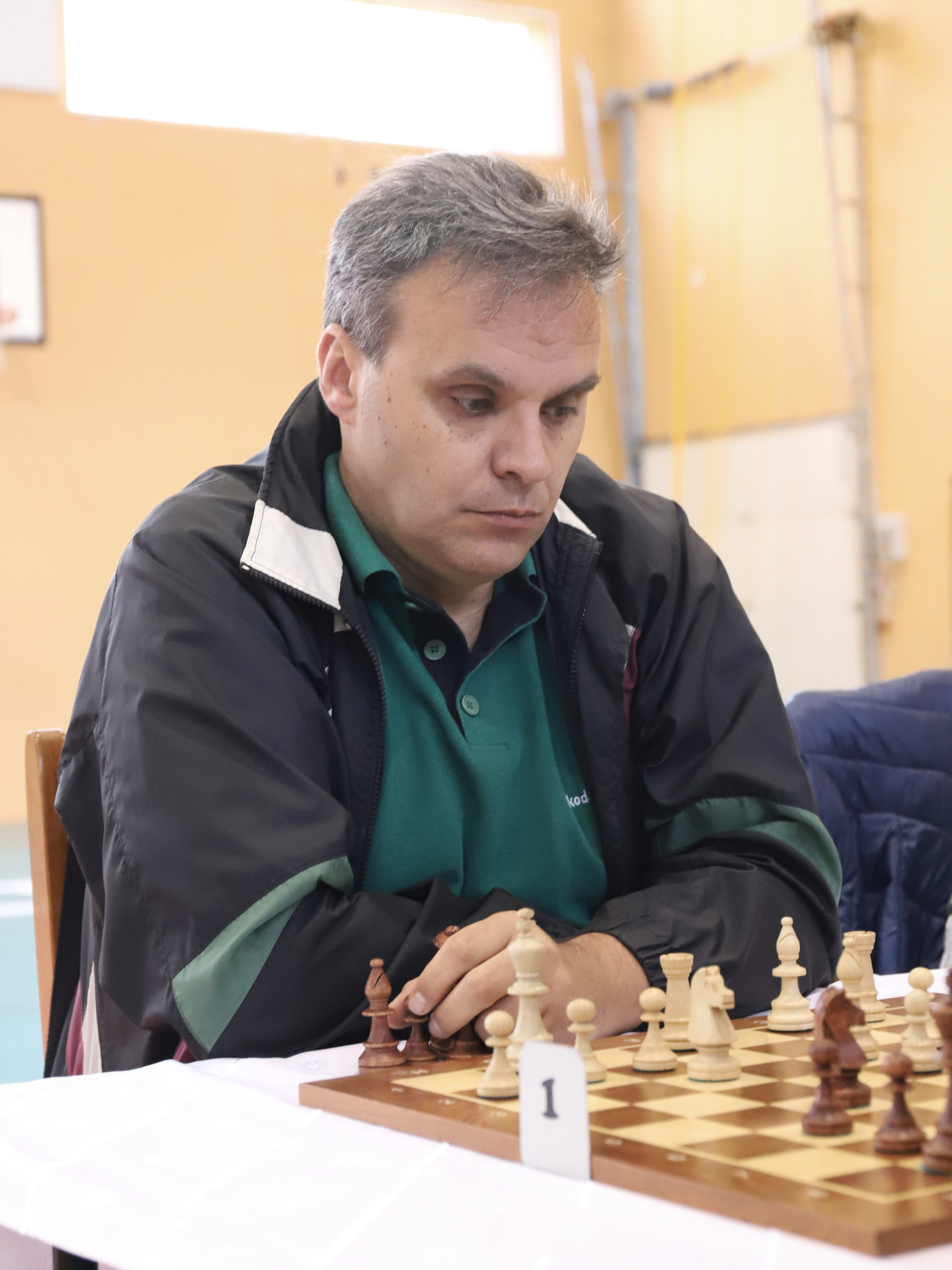
- Andrei Maksimenko in 2019

Personal information
- Born: 7 December 1969 (age 56) Cherkasy, Ukraine

Chess career
- Country: Ukraine
- Title: Grandmaster (1995)
- Peak rating: 2559 (November 2011)

Andrei Maksimenko (Ukrainian: Андрiй Максименко, romanized: Andriy Maksymenko; born 7 December 1969) is a Ukrainian chess Grandmaster (1995).

== Chess career ==
Andrei Maksimenko achieved his first successes in the early 1990s. With the Ukrainian SSR national team, he won the 19th Soviet Team Chess Championship (the last in the history of the country). He also received a gold medal in the individual classification, showing the best result on the 6th board. In 1992, he took 4th place in the Ukrainian Chess Championship in Simferopol. In 1993 Andrei Maksimenko took the 1st place in Lublin, and in 1994 he took the 2nd-3rd place (behind Gyula Sax) in Cattolica. In 1995, he achieved further successes: he single-handedly won the round-robin tournament in Aalborg (before Michał Krasenkow), took 2nd place in a strong competition in Copenhagen (behind Peter Leko, and ahead of Igor Glek, József Pintér, Curt Hansen and Jonny Hector) and triumphed (together with Dorian Rogozenco) in Lviv. In 1996 Andrei Maksimenko won the Schöneck (tournament B, ahead of Robert Kuczyński), in 1997 he shared the 1st place (together with Marek Oliwa, Aleksander Czerwoński and Mladen Muše) in the Emanuel Lasker memorial in Barlinek, in 1999 he took the 2nd place (behind Alexander Motylev) in Lviv, and a year later in this city he took the 1st place (together with Alexander Chernin). In 2001 Andrei Maksimenko won in Milan and took 1st place in the next tournament held in Lviv. In 2002, he shared the 1st place in Legnica (together with Stanisław Zawadzki), and a year later he repeated this achievement (together with Gyula Sax) in Bratto (Lombardia). In 2004, he single-handedly won in two round-robin tournaments held in Poland: in Nowy Targ and in Barlinek (Emanuel Lasker Memorial), while in 2006 he was among the winners (together with, among others, Jakub Czakon) of the traditional tournament in Görlitz. In 2009, Andrei Maksimenko took the 2nd place (behind Viktor Erdős) in Berlin, and in 2013 he won (together with Vladimir Malaniuk) in the tournament for the Cup of the Lower Silesian Voivode in Legnica.

The highest rating in his career Andrei Maksimenko was reached on November 1, 2011, when he took 33rd place among Ukrainian chess players with a score of 2559 points.

In 1991, Andrei Maksimenko was awarded the FIDE International Master (IM) title and received the FIDE Grandmaster (GM) title four years later.
