= Ben Magana =

Kenyan chess player (born 1977)

Personal information
- Born: 1977 (age 48–49) Chulaimbo, Kenya

Chess career
- Country: Kenya
- Title: Candidate Master (2013)
- Peak rating: 2200 (January 2001)

Benjamin Magana is a Kenyan chess player. He is a three-time Kenyan Chess Champion, winning in 2006, 2013, and 2017.

== Chess career ==
Magana was introduced to chess in primary school by his brother, and won his high school's chess championship. He has represented Kenya in several Olympiads.

In November 2023, he was the captain of the KCB Chess Team in the Mombasa Open Chess Championship, which was named the best corporate team in the tournament.

In 2025, he conducted training sessions in chess for school teachers in Kenya after chess was added to the Kenya Secondary Schools Sports Association's calendar.

In September 2026, he played for Kenya in the 46th Chess Olympiad, where he scored 6/10 across his games.

== Personal life ==
He studied mechanical engineering at the Jomo Kenyatta University of Science and Technology, where he also played chess and rugby.
