= Ameet Ghasi =

English chess grandmaster (born 1987)

Personal information
- Born: 4 February 1987 (age 39)

Chess career
- Country: England
- Title: Grandmaster (2024)
- FIDE rating: 2490 (October 2026)
- Peak rating: 2515 (January 2026)

Ameet K. Ghasi (born 4 February 1987) is an English chess player who received the FIDE title of International Master (IM) in September 2012 and the FIDE title of Grandmaster in October 2024.

== Biography ==
In 2000, at the age of 13, Ghasi shared the British Rapidplay Chess Championship title with Aaron Summerscale becoming the youngest ever winner. He was once considered one of the brightest prospects on the chess circuit, but Ghasi put his chess career on hold to further his academic studies. His twin brother, Sumeet Ghasi, is also a strong player, rated around 2200 FIDE.

Ghasi completed his Biochemistry degree at The University of Birmingham and worked for the National Audit Office as a trainee accountant, and later for Deloitte LLP.

In August 2011, he decided, after five years of absence, to return to the game to seek the title of Grandmaster and during a competition in Sunningdale, took one step closer to gaining the International Master title by winning eight games in a row.

In March 2012, Ghasi won the 2012 British Blitz Championship with 9/11 beating Robert Wilmoth in the final round.

In October 2024, Ghasi became the oldest British player to obtain the Grandmaster title by achieving his third Grandmaster norm in the international tournament at Fagernes, Norway at 37 years of age.

In December 2025, he became the co-winner of the London Chess Classic Open, tying on 7/9 and sharing first place with R Praggnanandhaa and Velimir Ivić.
