= Iain Gordon =

British mathematician

Iain Gordon FRSE
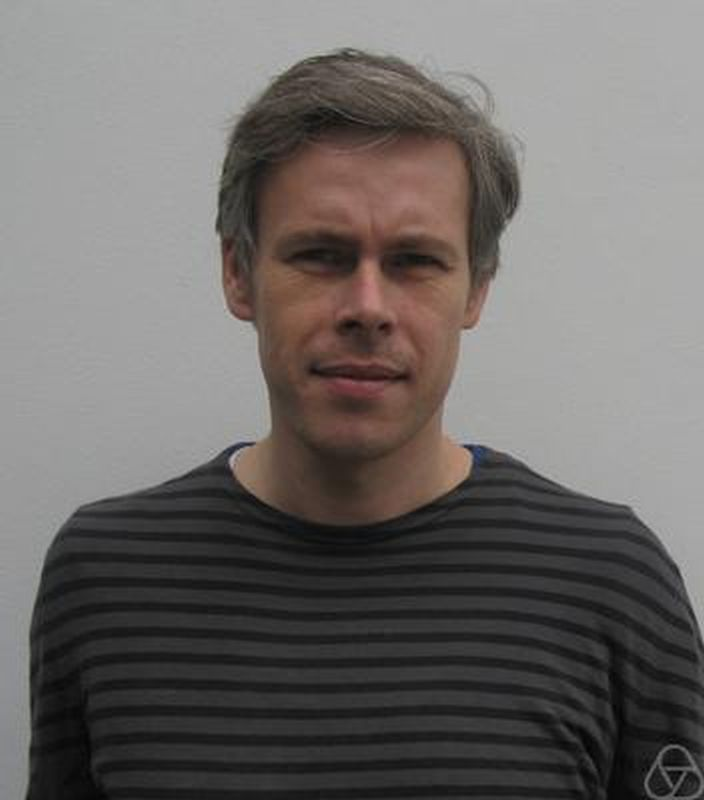
- Children: 2, including Frederick Waldhausen Gordon

Academic work
- Discipline: Mathematics
- Sub-discipline: Representation theory and noncommutative algebra
- Institutions: University of Edinburgh

Iain Gordon, FRSE, is a mathematician, who is currently Professor of Mathematics, Vice-Principal and Head of the College of Science and Engineering at the University of Edinburgh. From the beginning of August 2026 he will take up a new position as Senior Vice-Principal at the University of Glasgow. His field of specialisation is representation theory and noncommutative algebra.

== Education and career ==
Gordon studied mathematics as an undergraduate at the University of Bristol (1991–94), took Part III at Magdalene College, the University of Cambridge (1994–95), and completed his PhD on Representations of Quantised Function Algebras at Roots of Unity at the University of Glasgow under the supervision of Ken Brown (1995–1998). He was the Seggie Brown Fellow in Edinburgh (1998–99) and a postdoc at the Bielefeld University, the University of Antwerp and MSRI (1999–2000). He was a lecturer and then reader in the Department of Mathematics at the University of Glasgow (2000–2006), and since then has been the Professor of Mathematics at the University of Edinburgh.

In 2005, Gordon was awarded the Berwick Prize of the London Mathematical Society for his article Baby Verma modules for rational Cherednik algebras. In 2008 he was awarded a 5-year EPSRC Leadership Fellowship to support his research on Rigid Structure in Noncommutative, Geometric and Combinatorial Problems. In 2010 he was elected as a Fellow of the Royal Society of Edinburgh and was an invited speaker at the International Congress of Mathematicians in Hyderabad on Rational Cherednik Algebras. In 2014 he won the Edinburgh University Student Association's Van Heyningen Award for Teaching in Science and Engineering. Since 2018, he has been the Principal Investigator on a 6-year EPSRC Programme Grant with Arend Bayer, Tom Bridgeland, Agata Smoktunowicz and Michael Wemyss on Enhancing Representation Theory, Noncommutative Algebra and Geometry. He was elected as Vice President of the London Mathematical Society in 2019.

He was Head of School of Mathematics at the University of Edinburgh between 2014 and 2021, at which point he was succeeded by Prof Bernd J Schroers. Gordon has been Vice-Principal and Head of the College of Science and Engineering at the University of Edinburgh since 2021. As Vice-Principal, Gordon is a member of the Senior Leadership Team and University Executive. On 20 May 2025, the Senate, the University of Edinburgh's supreme academic body, approved the motion that "Senate has no confidence in the University Executive’s leadership in relation to the University’s financial situation", by a two thirds majority.

== Personal life ==
Iain Gordon has two children with Dr Maja Waldhausen, daughter of mathematician Friedhelm Waldhausen; Josephine Waldhausen Gordon (born 2010) and Frederick Waldhausen Gordon (born 2012).
