= Stanisław Zawadzki (chess player) =

Polish chess player (born 1984)

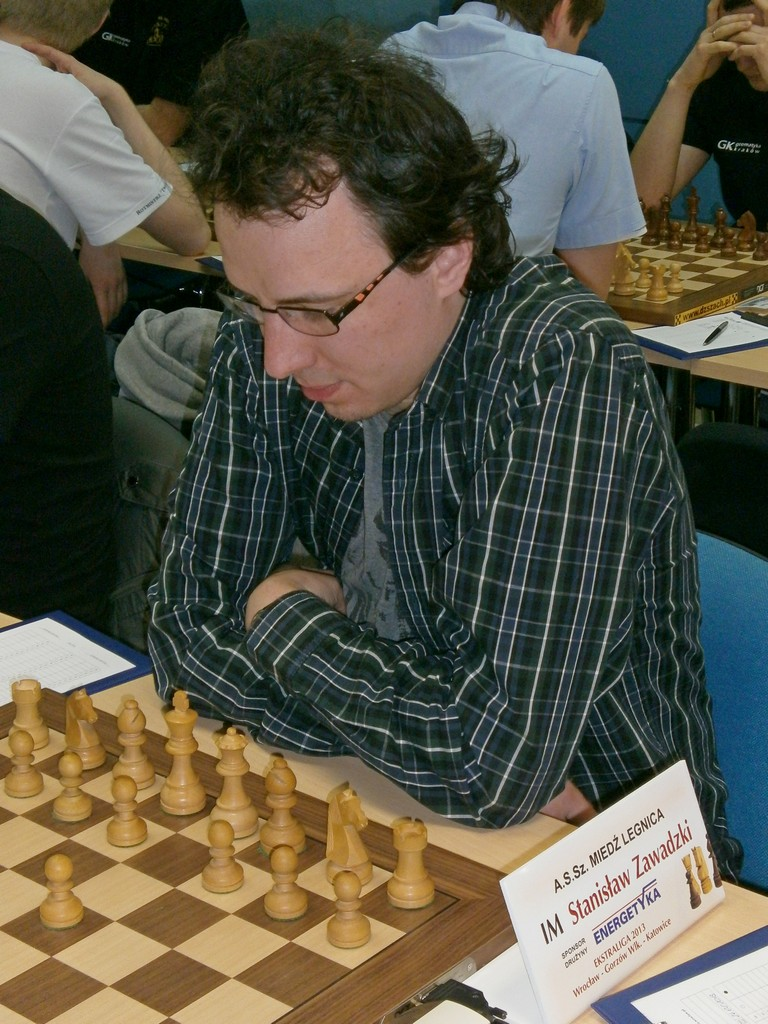
- Stanisław Zawadzki in 2013

Personal information
- Born: 28 June 1984 (age 42) Wrocław, Poland
- Spouse: Beata Kądziołka (m. 2014)

Chess career
- Country: Poland
- Title: International Master (2003)
- FIDE rating: 2425 (August 2026)
- Peak rating: 2447 (October 2008)

Stanisław Zawadzki (born 28 June 1984) is a Polish chess International Master (2003).

== Chess career ==
From an early age, Stanisław Zawadzki has participated in the final tournaments for the Polish Youth Chess Championship in all age groups many times. He has 3 titles of Polish Youth Chess Champion in this achievements, which he won in: 1998 (U14), 2002 (Częstochowa, U18 in blitz chess) and 2004 (Koszalin, U20 in rapid chess). He also has a silver medal in the Polish Youth Chess Championship in U18 age group (Bartkowa, 2002) and a bronze medal in Polish Blitz Chess Championship (Polanica-Zdrój, 2005).

Stanisław Zawadzki has competed in the World and European Youth Chess Championships. He achieved his greatest success in 2000, taking 9th place at the European Youth Chess Championship in U16 age group in Chalkidiki.

In 2002, Stanisław Zawadzki took 1st place in two international chess tournaments: in Frýdek-Místek and in Legnica (together with Andrei Maksimenko). In 2004, he shared 2nd place in Los Llanos de Aridane. In 2005, he took 2nd place in the international chess tournament in Wrocław, and in 2006 he won the Swiss-system tournament in Olomouc and shared the 1st place in the Polish Academic Chess Cup in Wrocław.

Stanisław Zawadzki is a student of the chess section at the Youth Cultural Center Wrocław Śródmieście, currently represents the colors of the ASSz Miedź Legnica chess club. He also plays in foreign leagues - in Czech Republic for A64 Grygov and in Portugal for Academica Coimbra. Stanisław Zawadzki was graduate of 14th High School in Wrocław.

In 2008, Stanisław Zawadzki was one of the founders of the chess magazine Mat.

Stanisław Zawadzki reached the highest rating in his career so far on October 1, 2008, with a score of 2447 points, he was ranked 41st among Polish chess players.

== Private life ==
Stanisław Zawadzki's sister, Jolanta, is a Woman Grandmaster (WGM) and one of the top Polish female chess players. In July 2014, he married the Woman Grandmaster (WGM) Beata Zawadzka (née Kądziołka).
