= Harry Grieve =

English chess grandmaster (born 2001)

Personal information
- Born: April 12, 2001 (age 25)

Chess career
- Country: England
- Title: Grandmaster (2026)
- FIDE rating: 2505 (September 2026)
- Peak rating: 2508 (August 2026)

Harry Grieve is an English chess grandmaster.

== Chess career ==
In January 2022, he earned his first IM norm at the Roquetas Open, during which he defeated grandmaster Karthik Venkataraman and drew with grandmaster Daniel Dardha. He finished the event tied for first place with Alexandr Fier, Liam Vrolijk, and Tor Fredrik Kaasen.

In August 2022, he won the British Chess Championship, where he finished a half-point ahead of grandmaster and defending champion Nicholas Pert and also received his first GM norm.

In May 2023, Harry obtained his second GM norm in the 4NCL playing for the Sharks team.

In May 2025, he played on the top board for the Manx Liberty team in the Four Nations Chess League. He was the top scorer, achieving 9.5/11 and helping the team to the championship.

In May 2026, he scored 7/9 in the GM-A group of the SixDays Budapest tournament, a ten-player round robin played from 14 to 19 May, to complete his final Grandmaster norm. The norm was registered by FIDE on 1 July 2026; with a peak rating of 2503 he has also met the 2500 rating requirement, and was subsequently awarded the Grandmaster title in September 2026.

== Personal life ==
Grieve studied mathematics at St Catharine's College, Cambridge.
