= Harold Wanyama =

Ugandan chess player (born 1981)

Personal information
- Born: December 3, 1981 (age 44)

Chess career
- Country: Uganda
- Title: FIDE Master (2012)
- Peak rating: 2327 (December 2019)

Harold Wanyama is a Ugandan chess player. He has represented Uganda at several Chess Olympiads.

== Chess career ==
In April 2018, he won the KCB Kenya Open Chess Championship.

In August 2019, he won the bronze medal in the chess section of the All-African Games.

In May 2022, he won the East African Open Tournament after having a better tiebreak score than Ben Magana.

At the 44th Chess Olympiad, he held draws against Momchil Petkov and grandmaster Helgi Dam Ziska, both of whom were rated over 250 points higher.
