= William Watson (chess player) =

English chess grandmaster (born 1962)

Personal information
- Born: April 18, 1962 (age 64) Baghdad, Iraq

Chess career
- Country: England
- Title: Grandmaster (1990)
- FIDE rating: 2468 (July 2026)
- Peak rating: 2560 (July 1992)
- Peak ranking: No. 75 (July 1987)

William Nicholas Watson (born 18 April 1962 in Baghdad, Iraq) is an English chess grandmaster.

Watson was British Rapidplay Chess Champion in 1992 and British Chess Champion in 1994. Boris Spassky once described his style of play as that of a drunk with a machine gun.

Watson has long been inactive as a competitive chess player, and is a tax attorney and partner at Slaughter and May.
