= Stuart Conquest =

English chess grandmaster (born 1967)

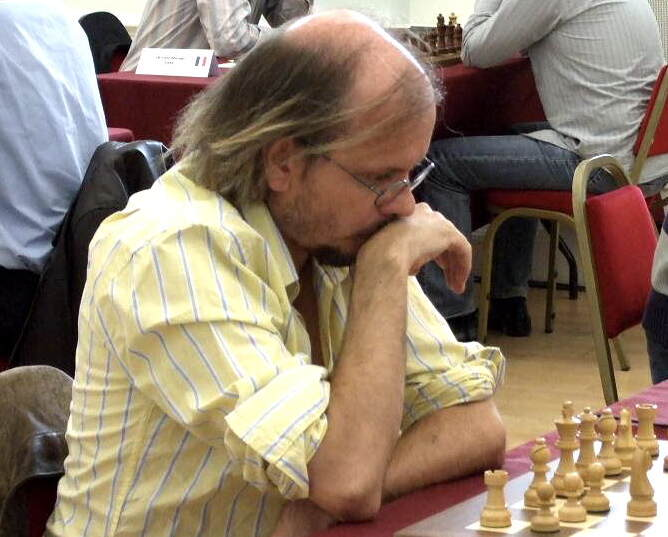
- Conquest at Liverpool in 2008

Personal information
- Born: 1 March 1967 (age 59) Ilford, London, England

Chess career
- Country: England
- Title: Grandmaster (1991)
- FIDE rating: 2506 (July 2026)
- Peak rating: 2601 (October 2001)
- Peak ranking: No. 84 (July 1996)

Stuart C. Conquest (born 1 March 1967 in Ilford, England) is an English chess Grandmaster, commentator and tournament director.

== Chess career ==
In 1981, at the age of 14, he won the World Youth Chess Championship in the under-16 category. Conquest was British Rapidplay Chess Champion in 1997. In 1995 and 2000 he shared first place at the Hastings Premier and in 2001, won the category 14 tournament in Clichy.

Following a relatively lean period, he capped his return to form in 2008 with victory in the British Chess Championship, defeating Keith Arkell in a two-game rapidplay play-off match for the title, after they tied for first place. In May 2009 he came first at the Capo d'Orso Open.

In 2025, Conquest competed in the British Championships with, among others, Gawain Jones, Michael Adams, and Nikita Vitiugov. He had a strong performance, remaining unbeaten in the classical section of the tournament and defeating both Vitiugov and Shreyas Royal, to finish joint first with Peter Roberson and Michael Adams. In a three-way tiebreak contest, Conquest won a 2-game rapid match against Roberson, but lost both games in the final match against Adams.

Since the mid-1990s, he has been a frequent member of the England team at the Olympiads and European Team Chess Championships.

A prolific player at international tournaments for many years, Conquest has gradually become better known for his commentary work, and (since 2011) was the tournament director of the Gibraltar Chess Festival, held annually at the Caleta Hotel in Catalan Bay. The event concluded in 2020, when the venue could no longer be made available.

== Chess strength ==
His highest Elo rating was 2601, in the October 2001 FIDE rating list. He gained the International Master and Grandmaster titles in 1985 and 1991 respectively.
