= Aleksander Czerwoński =

Polish chess player (born 1965)

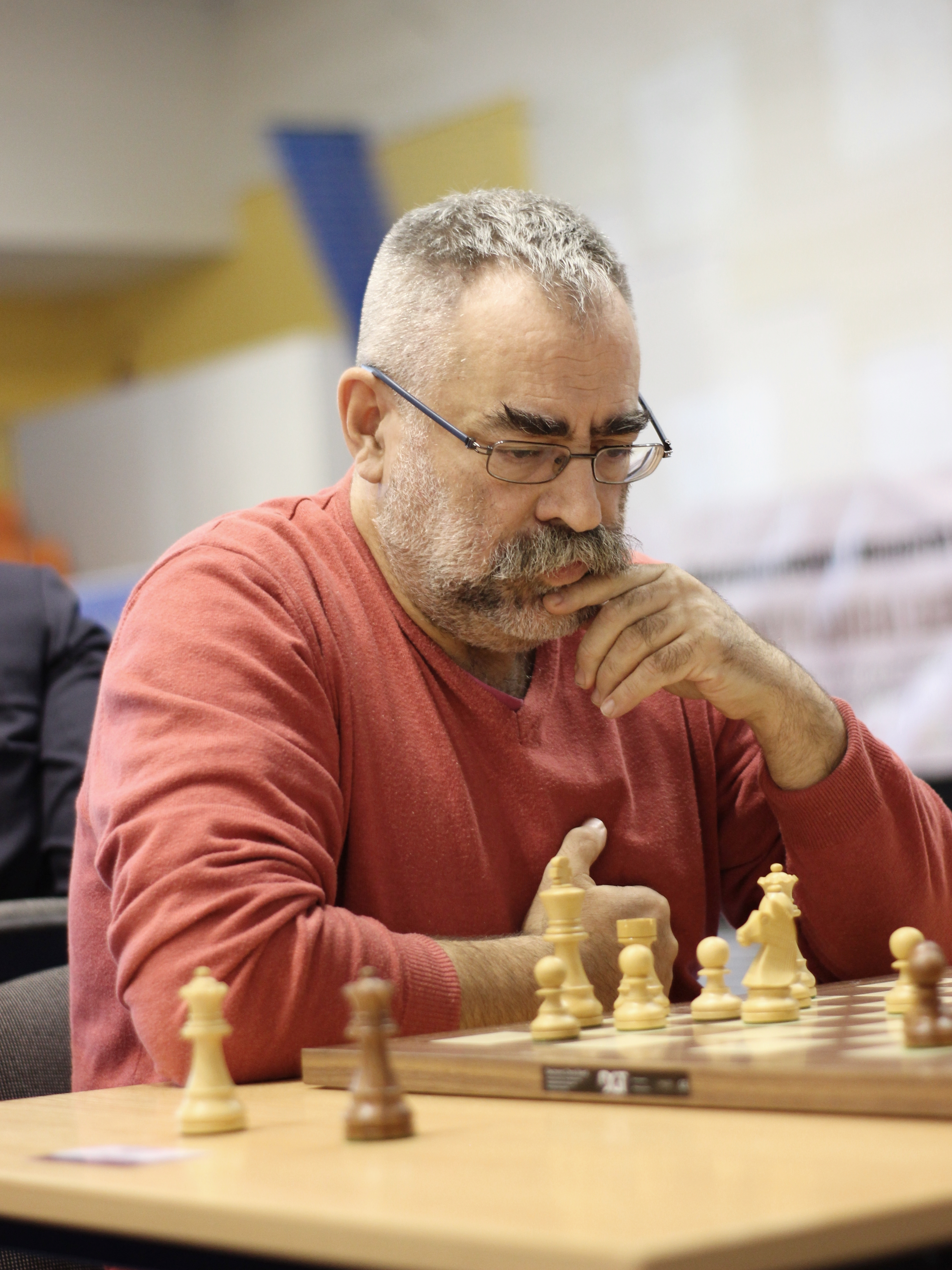
- Aleksander Czerwoński in 2018

Personal information
- Born: 27 July 1965 (age 60) Warsaw, Poland

Chess career
- Country: Poland
- Title: International Master (1996)
- Peak rating: 2426 (July 1999)

Aleksander Czerwoński (born 27 July 1965) is a Polish chess International Master (1996).

== Chess career ==
Czerwoński is a two-time bronze medalist of the Polish Junior Chess Championships, in 1985 (Wrocław, in U20 age group) and 1988 (Kielce, in U23 age group). In the years 1986–2000, he played in the Polish Chess Championship finals seven times. He achieved his best result in 1994 in Gdańsk, taking 9th place. He won Polish Team Chess Championships medals seven times (gold six times, in 1991–1998, and bronze in 1999), all of them - representing the chess club Stilon Gorzów Wielkopolski.

In 1987, Czerwoński took 3rd place in the chess Swiss-system tournament in Warsaw, in 1989 he triumphed in Słupsk, and in 1990 he took 2nd place in Open in Bielsko-Biała. In 1997, he won (together with Andrei Maksimenko, Marek Oliwa and Mladen Muše) in the Emanuel Lasker memorial in Barlinek , in 1998 he shared 2nd place in the Warsaw Chess Championship. In 2000, he won a tournament in Cuxhaven. In 2003, he took 3rd place in the Open tournament in Kożuchów, in 2004, he shared 1st - 3rd place in Rewal in Konik Morski Rewal chess tournament and won in Gorzów Wielkopolski. In 2006, he took 3rd place in the Emanuel Lasker memorial in Barlinek and won again in Gorzów. In 2008, he won the '11.Neujahrs-Open' tournament in Guben.

From 1999 to 2005 Czerwoński was a co-worker and then editor-in-chief of the monthly chess magazine Przegląd Szachowy. He also achieved success as a chess coach. Among other things, he led the junior team of KSz Stilon in 2006, 2008 and in 2009 when team won the Polish Team Junior Championship, and in 2007 when team took 2nd place.

Czerwoński achieved the highest rating in his career so far on 1 July 1999, with a score of 2426 points, he was then 23rd among Polish chess players.
