= Peter Wells (chess player) =

English chess grandmaster (born 1965)

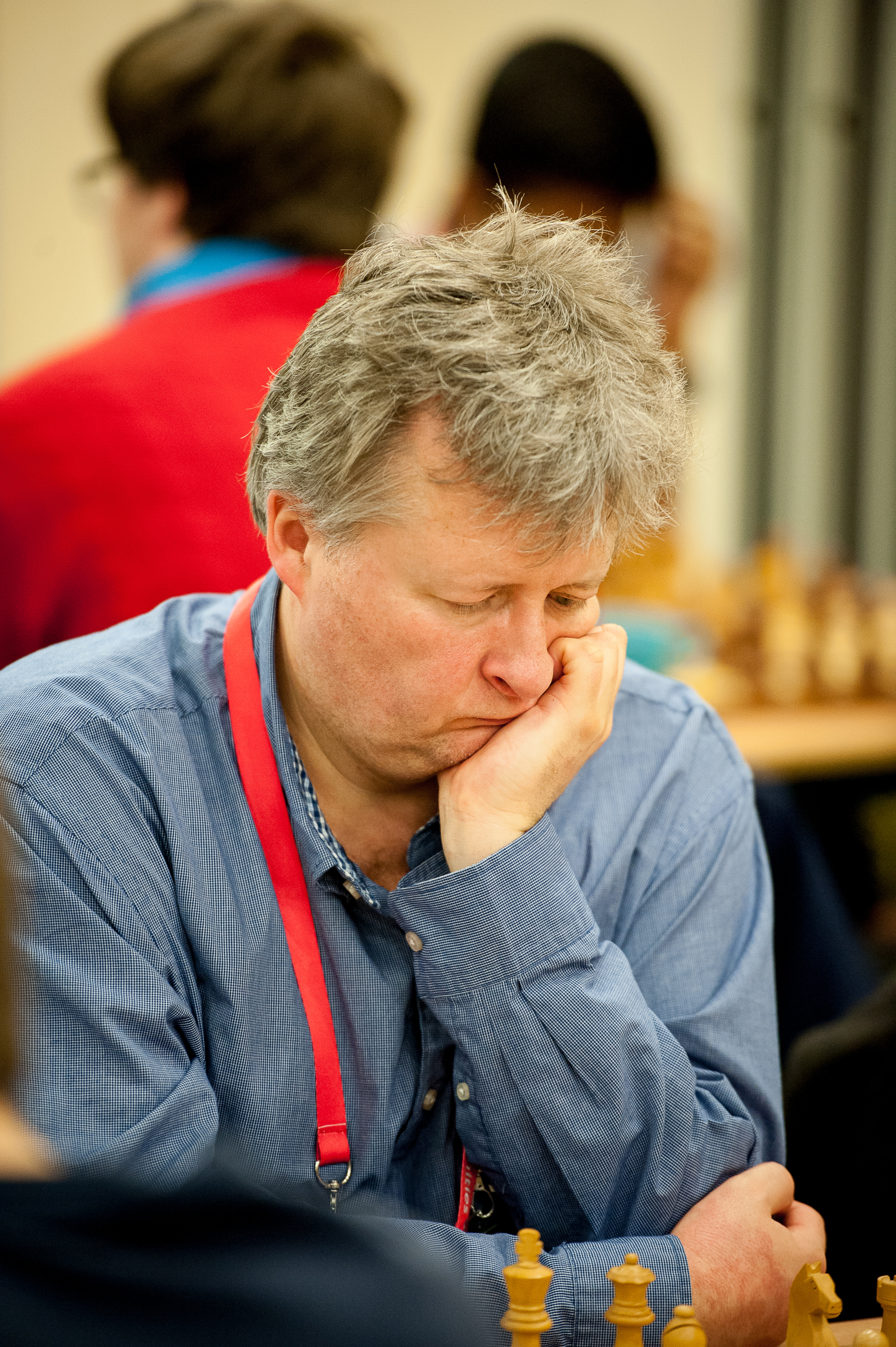
- Wells in 2016

Personal information
- Born: Peter Kenneth Wells; 17 April 1965 (age 61) Portsmouth, England

Chess career
- Country: England
- Title: Grandmaster (1994)
- Peak rating: 2545 (July 1995)

Peter Kenneth Wells (born 1965) is an English chess grandmaster and author. He won the British Rapidplay Chess Championships in 2002, 2003, and 2007.

Bodhana Sivanandan defeating him in August 2025 made her the youngest girl to defeat a grandmaster, beating Carissa Yip's record by over 6 months, and gave her the final norm needed to become a Woman International Master, making her the youngest ever to earn that title.

== Books ==
- Wells, Peter (1994). The Complete Semi-Slav. Henry Holt & Co. ISBN 978-0805032888.
- Wells, Peter (1994). Piece Power. Batsford. ISBN 978-0713475135.
- Wells, Peter; Osnos, Viacheslav (1998). The Complete Richter-Rauzer. Batsford. ISBN 978-0713478075.
- Wells, Peter (1998). The Scotch Game. Sterling. ISBN 978-0713484663.
- Wells, Peter (2004). Winning with the Trompowsky. Sterling. ISBN 978-0713487954.
- Wells, Peter (2006). Chess Explained: The Queen's Indian. Gambit. ISBN 978-1904600497.
- Wells, Peter (2007). Grandmaster Secrets: The Caro-Kann. Gambit. ISBN 978-1904600619.
- Wells, Peter; Emms, John; Palliser, Richard (2009). Dangerous Weapons: Anti-Sicilians. Everyman. ISBN 978-1857445855.
- Wells, Peter; Hymer, Barry (2020). Chess Improvement: It's All in the Mindset. Crown House. ISBN 978-1785835025.
