= Frederick Waldhausen Gordon =

Scottish chess player (born 2010)

Personal information
- Born: 16 August 2010 (age 16) Edinburgh, Scotland

Chess career
- Country: Scotland
- Title: International Master (2026)
- FIDE rating: 2455 (September 2026)
- Peak rating: 2465 (October 2026)

Frederick G F A Waldhausen Gordon is a Scottish chess player.

== Early life ==
Waldhausen Gordon was born on 16 August 2010

He is the son of Dr Maja Waldhausen and Prof Iain Gordon. He has a sister, Josephine M E Waldhausen Gordon, who is two years older than him. His maternal grandfather was the mathematician Friedhelm Waldhausen.

== Chess career ==
In 2021, he defeated grandmaster Bogdan Lalic in an online rapid 10+5 game in the ECF Grand Prix Rapid Event 1 held on lichess.org.

In March 2026, he won the British Rapidplay Championship by defeating grandmaster Gawain Maroroa Jones in the final round. He became the first Scottish player to win the event.
