= Parker Palmer =

American author, educator, and activist (born 1939)

Parker J. Palmer
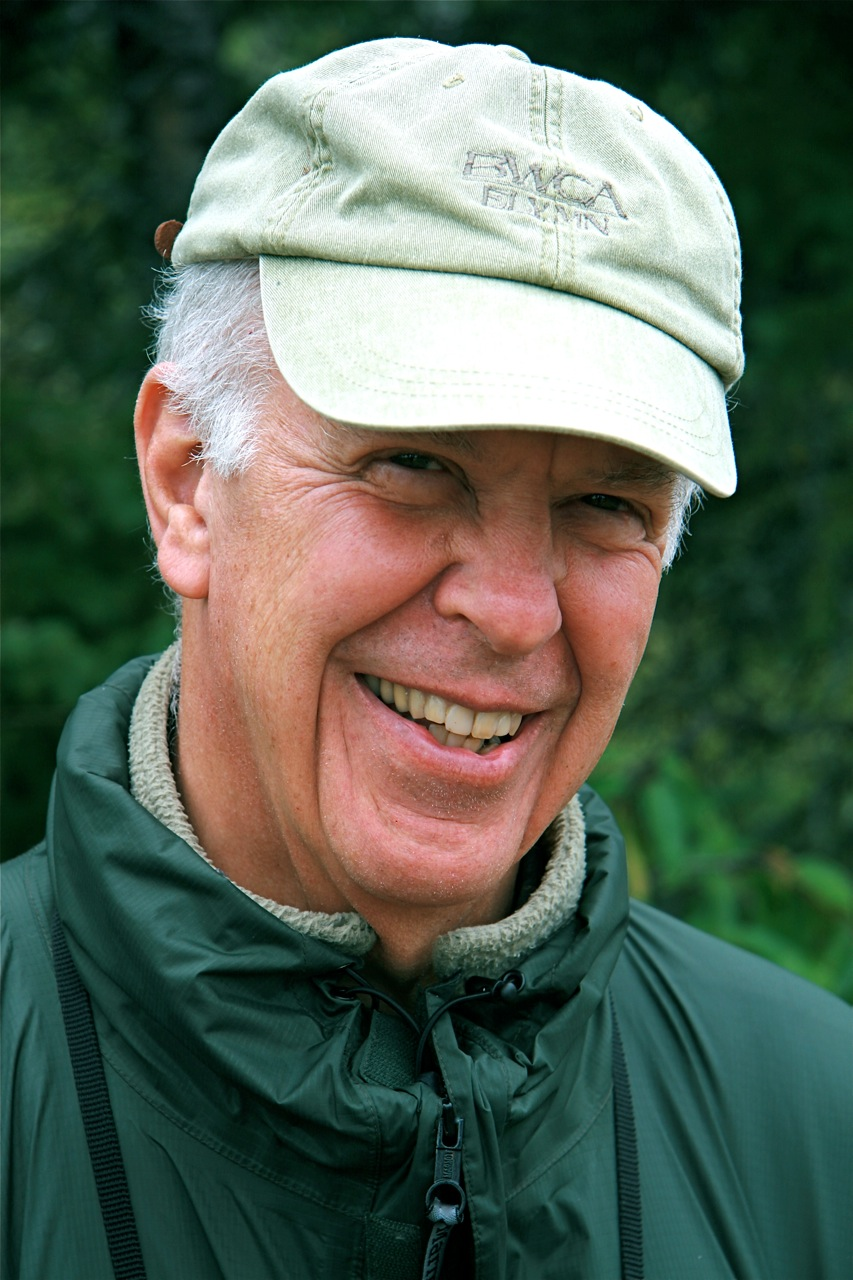
- Born: February 28, 1939 (age 87); Chicago, Illinois, U.S.
- Education: Carleton College; University of California, Berkeley
- Occupations: Writer; educator

Parker J. Palmer is an American author, educator, and activist who focuses on issues in education, community, leadership, spirituality and social change. He has published ten books and numerous essays and poems, and is founder and Senior Partner Emeritus of the Center for Courage and Renewal. His work has been recognized with major foundation grants, several national awards, and fourteen honorary doctorates.

== Life and career ==
Palmer was born in Chicago on February 28, 1939, and grew up in Wilmette and Kenilworth, Illinois. He studied philosophy and sociology at Carleton College, where he graduated in 1961 before going on to complete a Doctor of Philosophy degree in sociology at the University of California, Berkeley. After moving to the East Coast for a job as a community organizer and a teaching position at Georgetown University, Palmer became involved with the Religious Society of Friends (Quakers) at Pendle Hill, where he served as dean of studies and writer in residence. Palmer is the founder and senior partner emeritus of the Center for Courage & Renewal, which oversees the "Courage to Teach" program for K–12 educators across the country and parallel programs for people in other professions, including medicine, law, ministry and philanthropy.

He has published a dozen poems, more than one hundred essays and ten books. Palmer's work has been recognized with fourteen honorary doctorates, two Distinguished Achievement Awards from the National Educational Press Association, an Award of Excellence from the Associated Church Press, and grants from the Danforth Foundation, the Lilly Endowment and the Fetzer Institute. Palmer has been featured on the On Being podcast with Krista Tippet, and regularly contributes to the On Being blog.

== Honors and awards ==
- In 1993, Palmer won the national award of the Council of Independent Colleges for Outstanding Contributions to Higher Education.
- In 1998, The Leadership Project, a national survey of 10,000 administrators and faculty, named Palmer as one of the thirty “most influential senior leaders” in higher education and one of the ten key “agenda-setters” of the past decade: “He has inspired a generation of teachers and reformers with evocative visions of community, knowing, and spiritual wholeness.”
- In 2001, the Carleton College Alumni Association gave Palmer a Distinguished Achievement Award.
- In 2002, the Accreditation Council for Graduate Medical Education created the “Parker J. Palmer Courage to Teach Award”, given annually to the directors of ten medical residency programs that exemplify patient-centered professionalism in medical education.
- In 2003, the American College Personnel Association named Palmer a “Diamond Honoree” for outstanding contributions to the field of student affairs.
- In 2005, Sam Intrator (ed.) published Living the Questions: Essays Inspired by the Work and Life of Parker J. Palmer (San Francisco: Jossey-Bass, 2005).
- In 2010, the Religious Education Association (An Association of Professors, Practitioners, and Researchers in Religious Education) presented Palmer with the William Rainey Harper Award, “given to outstanding leaders whose work in other fields has had profound impact upon religious education.” Named after the first president of the University of Chicago, founder of the REA, the award has been given only ten times since its establishment in 1970. Previous recipients include Marshall McLuhan, Elie Wiesel, Margaret Mead and Paulo Freire.
- In 2011, Palmer was named an Utne Reader Visionary, one of "25 people who are changing your world."
- In 2017, Palmer was given the Shalem Institute’s Contemplative Voices Award, given annually to an individual who has made significant contributions to contemplative understanding, living and leadership.
- In 2019, Palmer's book On the Brink of Everything: Grace, Gravity & Getting Old was the gold medalist in the "Aging/Death & Dying” category of the 2019 Independent Book Publisher Book Awards.

== Published works ==
- Palmer, Parker J. (2018-06-26). On the Brink of Everything: Grace, Gravity, and Getting Old. Oakland: Berrett-Koehler. ISBN 978-1523095438.
- ——— (2011-09-06). Healing the Heart of Democracy: The Courage to Create a Politics Worthy of the Human Spirit. San Francisco: Jossey-Bass. ISBN 978-0-470-59080-5.
- ———; Zajonc, Arthur; Scribner, Megan (2010-07-20). The Heart of Higher Education: A Call to Renewal. San Francisco: Jossey-Bass. ISBN 978-0-470-48790-7.
- ——— (2004-09-22). A Hidden Wholeness: The Journey Toward an Undivided Life. San Francisco: Jossey-Bass. ISBN 978-0-7879-7100-7.
- ——— (2000-09-10). Let Your Life Speak: Listening for the Voice of Vocation. San Francisco: Jossey-Bass. ISBN 978-0-7879-4735-4.
- ——— (2007-08-17) [1997-11-21]. The Courage to Teach: Exploring the Inner Landscape of a Teacher's Life. San Francisco: Jossey-Bass. ISBN 978-0-7879-9686-4.
- ——— (1999-07-21) [1990]. The Active Life: A Spirituality of Work, Creativity and Caring. San Francisco: Jossey-Bass. ISBN 978-0-7879-4934-1.
- ——— (1983-08-25). The Company of Strangers: Christians and the Renewal of America's Public Life. New York: Crossroad. ISBN 978-0-8245-0601-8.
- ——— (1993-05-28) [1981]. To Know As We Are Known: Education as a Spiritual Journey. San Francisco: HarperOne. ISBN 978-0-06-066451-0.
- ——— (2008-04-18) [1980]. The Promise of Paradox: A Celebration of Contradictions in the Christian Life. San Francisco: Jossey-Bass. ISBN 978-0-7879-9696-3.
