= Kenyan Chess Championship =

Chess competition in Kenya

The Kenyan National Chess Championship is an annual individual chess tournament typically held in December and organized by Chess Kenya. It serves as the flagship event of the year and the first stage of the qualification system for the Chess Olympiad and the All African Games.

In 2019, 2021, 2022 and 2023, the first prize in the open section was a car.

== Winners ==
Year	Champion	Women
1990	Lawrence Kagambi	Anastasiah Mailu
1993	Humphrey Andolo	
1994	Lothar Nikolaiczuk	
1995	Humphrey Andolo	
1996	Philip Nicholas Odhiambo	
1997	Humphrey Andolo	
1998	Humphrey Andolo	
1999	Humphrey Andolo	
2001	Kenneth Ajode Omolo	
2003	Matthew Kamau Kanegeni	
2005	Nathan Mukaka Ateka	
2006	Ben Magana	
2007	Peter Gilruth	
2013	Ben Magana	
2014	Mehul Gohil	Sanjana Deshpande
2015	Kenneth Ajode Omolo	Riya Shah
2017	Ben Magana	
2018	Victor Ngani	
2019	Mehul Gohil	
2021	Martin Njoroge	Sasha Mongeli
2022	Mehul Gohil	Joyce Nyaruai
2023	Joseph Methu Muragu	Sasha Mongeli
2024	Robert Mcligeyo	Sasha Mongeli
2025	Jadon Simiyu	Jully Mutisya
