= Dejan Bojkov =

Bulgarian chess grandmaster and author (born 1977)

Personal information
- Born: 3 July 1977 (age 49) Shumen, Bulgaria

Chess career
- Country: Bulgaria
- Title: Grandmaster (2008)
- FIDE rating: 2479 (July 2026)
- Peak rating: 2556 (March 2012)

Dejan Bojkov (Bulgarian: Деян Божков; born 3 July 1977) is a Bulgarian chess grandmaster and chess author. He earned his grandmaster title in 2008 and won the 48th Canadian Open Chess Championship in 2011. He worked for Antoaneta Stefanova as her trainer. He has also been running frequent training sessions with the New Zealand chess team.

== Bibliography ==
- Bojkov, Dejan (2010). A Course in Chess Tactics. Gambit. ISBN 978-1906454142.
