= Richard Pert =

English chess player (born 1981)

Personal information
- Born: 22 January 1981 (age 45) Leeds, England

Chess career
- Country: England
- Title: International Master (2002)
- FIDE rating: 2409 (September 2026)
- Peak rating: 2468 (July 2008)

Richard Giscard Pert (born 22 January 1981) is an English chess player.

== Career ==
In 2013, he wrote a book on the Trompowsky Attack, which received praise from grandmaster Glenn Flear.

He is the 2016 Essex Blitz Champion and the 2017 Essex Champion. He is also a chess coach at Brentwood School.

In August 2021, he won the British Blitz Championship. The event saw the strongest field of the British Online Chess Championships, and included strong grandmaster Jon Speelman.

In January 2024, he provided commentary for the Caplin Hastings International Chess Congress.

== Personal life ==
He is the twin brother of chess grandmaster Nicholas Pert. He is married and has a daughter who also plays chess and was British U8 Girls Champion in 2016.
