= Luisa Bashylina =

German chess player (born 2006)

Personal information
- Born: 21 April 2006 (age 20) Schwelm, Germany

Chess career
- Country: Germany
- Title: Woman FIDE Master (2021)
- Years active: 2016-present
- FIDE rating: 2181 (August 2026)
- Peak rating: 2262 (May 2024)

Luisa Bashylina (born April 2006 in Schwelm, Germany) is a Ukrainian-German chess player. She was awarded the title of Woman FIDE Master by FIDE in 2021.

== Chess career ==
In 2018, Bashylina won silver at the U-12 European Youth Chess Championship in Riga.

She won her category twice in the German Youth Chess Championship, the U-12 section in 2018 and the U-14 section in 2019.

She finished second in the German Women's Chess Championship in 2023.

She represented the German national team on various youth tournaments such as the European Youth Team Chess Championship in 2018 where she won gold with the German team in the U-12 section.

She won the European Rapid U16 Championship in 2022 and finished second in the European Blitz U16 Championship in the same year. Both events were held in Thessaloniki.
