= Aaron Summerscale =

English chess grandmaster (born 1969)

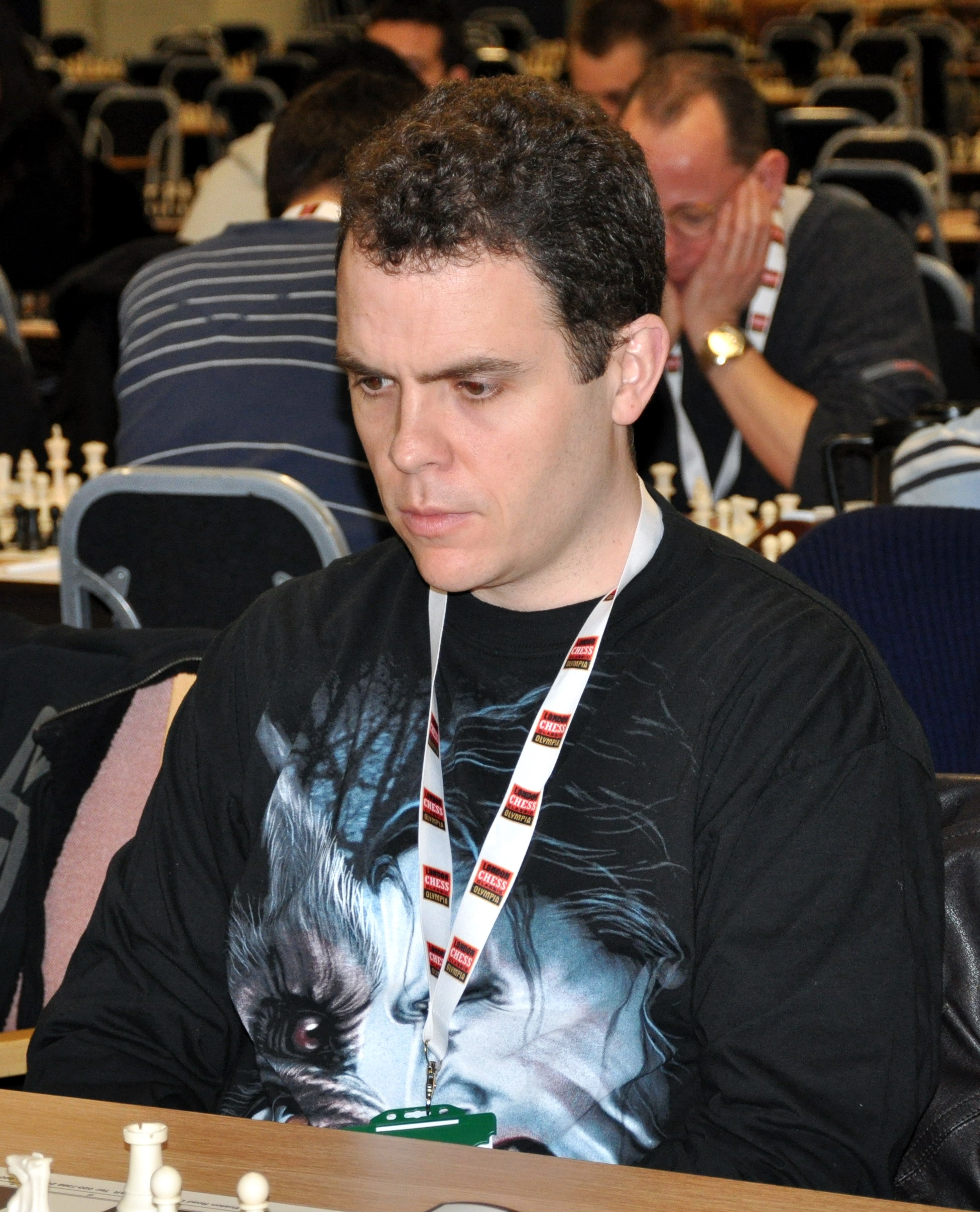
- Aaron Summerscale, London 2010

Personal information
- Born: August 26, 1969 (age 56)

Chess career
- Country: England
- Title: Grandmaster (1997)
- Peak rating: 2520 (July 2001)

Aaron Piers Summerscale (born 26 August 1969) is an English chess player who holds the title Grandmaster.

Summerscale was joint British Rapidplay Chess Champion in 2000.

== Books ==
- Summerscale, Aaron (1999). A Killer Chess Opening Repertoire. Globe Pequot. ISBN 978-1-85744-519-0.
- Summerscale, Aaron; Summerscale, Claire (2002). Interview With a Grandmaster. Everyman Chess. ISBN 978-1-85744-243-4.
