= Chulaimbo =

Town in Kenya

Chulaimbo is a town in Western Kenya, 35 km West of Kisumu City, located along the busy Kisumu -Busia road.

== Health Centre ==
Chulaimbo serves as a health center, being the home of Chulaimbo County Hospital and Masaba Hospital.

== Educational Centre ==
Schools such as Chulaimbo Boys High School and Chulaimbo Primary School are located within the Town

Residential Centre

Chulaimbo is a residential area for many people, many of whom who works in the facilities located in the town, such as the Schools, hospitals and the business enterprises

Economic Centre

Chulaimbo is a home to many businesses enterprises, ranging from wholesale services to retail services. Traders here trade in a range of goods, ranging from agricultural products to Commercial products
