= Grzegorz Masternak =

Polish chess player

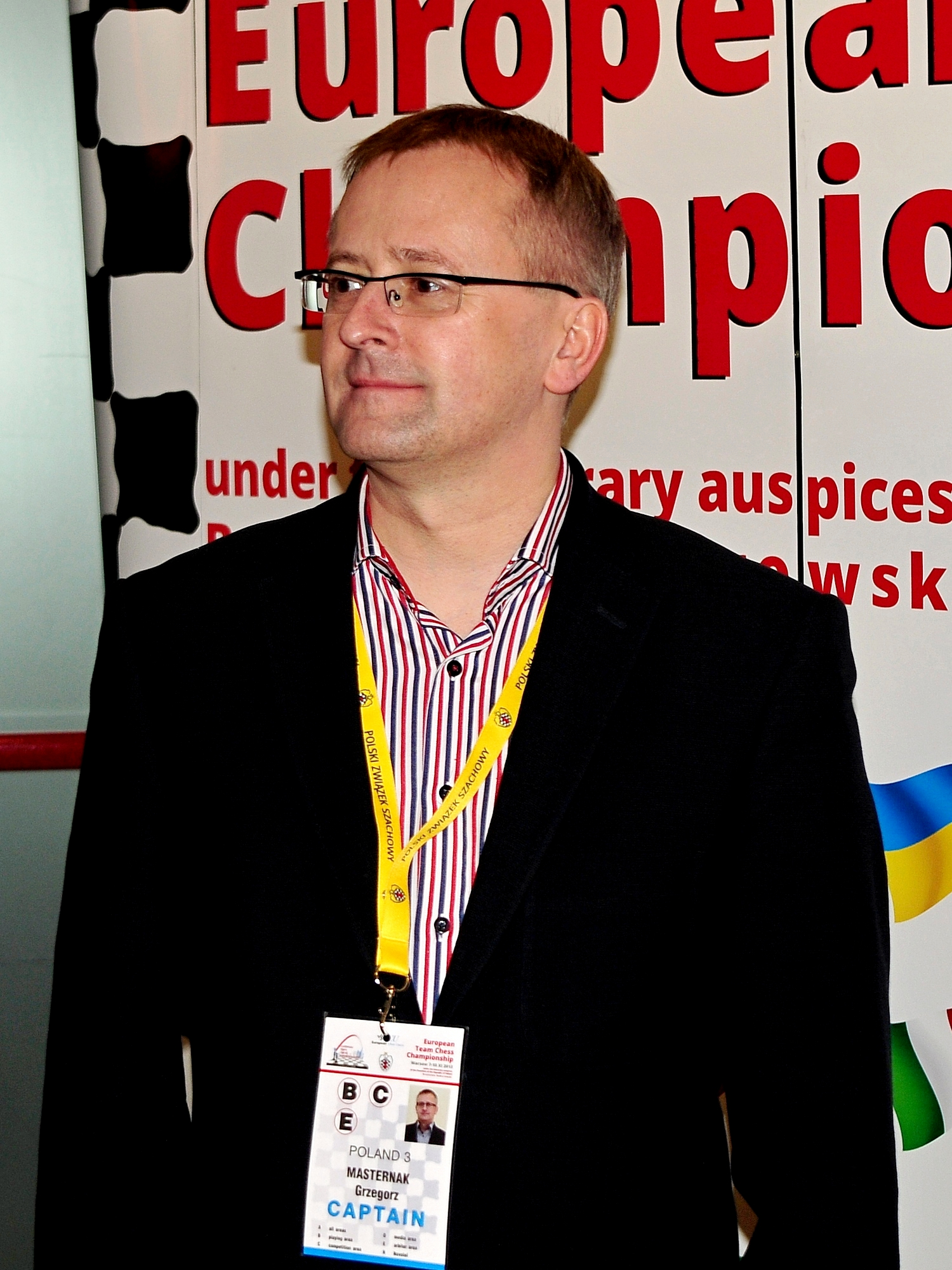
- Grzegorz Masternak in 2013

Personal information
- Born: 2 April 1970 (age 56) Mysłowice, Poland

Chess career
- Country: Poland
- Title: International Master (1996)
- Peak rating: 2395 (July 1995)

Grzegorz Masternak (born 2 April 1970) is a Polish chess International Master (1996).

== Chess career ==
Masternak is a two-time medallist of the Polish Junior Chess Championships. He won his first medal (bronze) in 1989 in Jędrzejów in the U19 age group, and the second (silver) - in 1990 in Nisko in the U20 age group. In 1993, he won the international chess Swiss-system tournament in Chorzów. In 1994, he won a bronze medal in Lubniewice in Polish Team Chess Championship, in the colours of the chess club Górnik Zabrze, and in 1995 shared 2nd place (behind Marek Oliwa) in the Swiss-system chess tournament in Bytom. In 2013, in Warsaw he played for the 3rd Polish national chess team in the European Team Chess Championship.

Masternak was captain of the chess team Wasko HETMAN Katowice, who won Polish Team Chess Championships in 2007, 2008, 2010 and 2013.

Masternak reached his career highest rating on 1 July 1995, with a score of 2395 points, and was then 30th -37th place among Polish chess players. Since 2001, he has very rarely participated in tournaments classified by FIDE.
