= Nicholas Pert =

English chess grandmaster (born 1981)

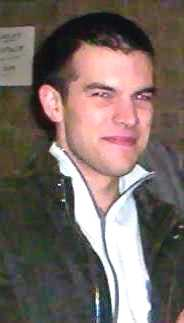
- Pert in 2004

Personal information
- Born: 22 January 1981 (age 45) Leeds, England
- Spouse: Michele Pert (m. 2009)

Chess career
- Country: England
- Title: Grandmaster (2001)
- FIDE rating: 2493 (September 2026)
- Peak rating: 2574 (January 2016)

Nicholas Pert (born 22 January 1981) is an English chess grandmaster.

== Chess career ==
Pert was the World Under-18 Chess Champion in 1998 and British Rapidplay Chess Champion in 2004. He has represented England at the highest level, including the 37th Chess Olympiad in Turin.

Having previously attained good results at the European U-12 and U-14 championships where he finished 3rd and 4th respectively, he attended Ipswich School and Oakham School, the latter known at the time for its chess excellence and a venue for some of the strongest international young master events. He later took up a place at Warwick University, graduating with a degree in Mathematics and Statistics. Pert then trained as an actuary, before returning to full-time chess playing and coaching. As with many chess professionals these days, he has also played poker as a means of supplementing his income.

Although he has not devoted himself entirely to the advancement of his chess-playing career, his rating has nevertheless shown a steady rise over the years and he can now be regarded as one of England's leading Grandmasters and a coach of some of England's most promising new talents. At the Guernsey Festival tournament of 2010, he won the event on tie-break from Grandmasters Tiger Hillarp Persson and Evgeny Sveshnikov. This brought his run of undefeated games, since the 2008 British Championship, to fifty-two.

In 2015, Pert tied for 2nd–4th with David Howell and Daniel Gormally, finishing third on tiebreak, in the British Chess Championship and later that year, he finished runner-up in the inaugural British Knockout Championship, which was held alongside the London Chess Classic. In this latter event, Pert, who replaced Nigel Short after his late withdrawal, eliminated Jonathan Hawkins in the quarterfinals and Luke McShane in the semifinals, then he lost to David Howell 4–6 in the final.

Pert won the 2021 British Championships outright in Hull in October 2021. He was succeeded as British Champion by Harry Grieve in 2022.

== Personal life ==
Pert was married to Michele in October 2009. He is the twin brother of chess International Master Richard Pert.
