= Wolf Villa =

House in Gubin, Poland (1926–1945)

Villa Wolf
- Haus Wolf
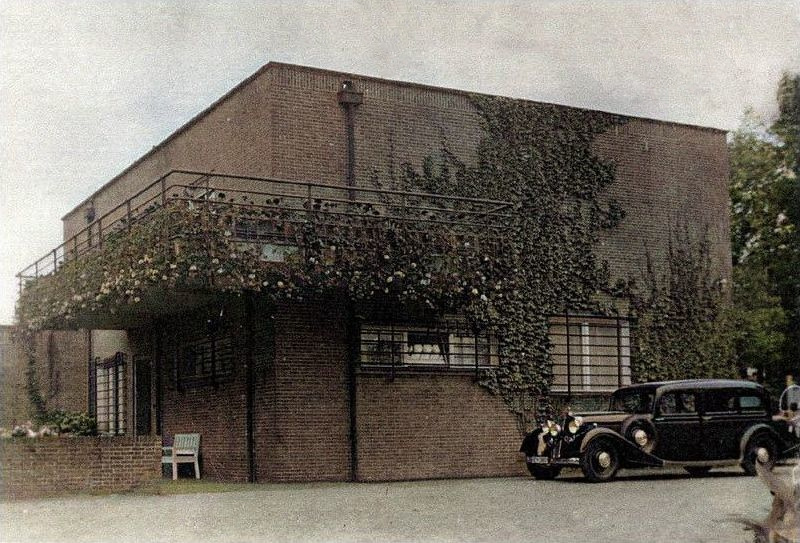
- View from the street towards the main entrance (1930s)
- Interactive map of the Villa Wolf area

General information
- Type: Villa
- Architectural style: Modernist
- Location: Gubin, Poland TT
- Coordinates: 51°57′23.9″N 14°43′18.3″E
- Construction started: 1925
- Completed: 1926
- Destroyed: 1945

Design and construction
- Architect: Ludwig Mies van der Rohe

The Wolf Villa (Polish: Willa Wolfa), also known as the Wolf House (German: Haus Wolf), was an architecturally significant building in Gubin, Poland, designed by the German architect Ludwig Mies van der Rohe. The property was developed in Guben, Germany, between 1925 and 1926 – two decades before the Oder–Neisse line divided the city to create Gubin – for Erich and Elisabeth Wolf. It was one of the pioneering prototypes of modern architecture in Europe, and is considered Mies's first modern work. It stood between two gardens parallel to the Lusatian Neisse river at Teichbornstraße 13 in today's Gubin, which at that time still belonged to Guben, but is now located in the Polish part of Lower Lusatia. It was destroyed during World War II in 1945 and there are plans to reconstruct it.

== History ==
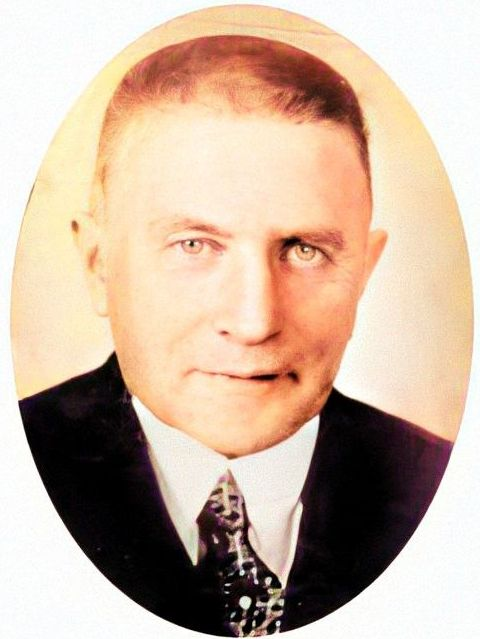
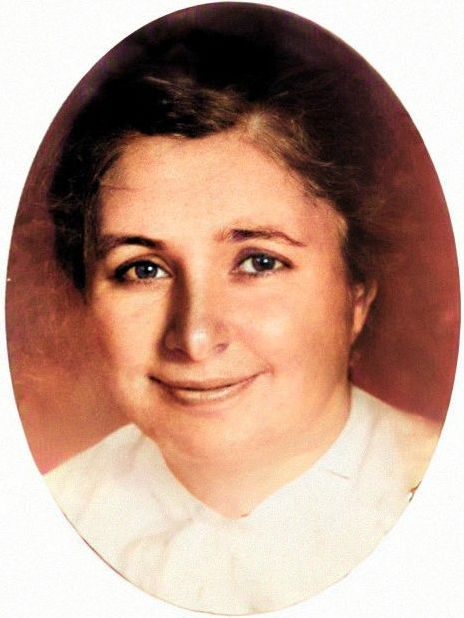
Erich and Elisabeth Wolf commissioned the villa in 1925.

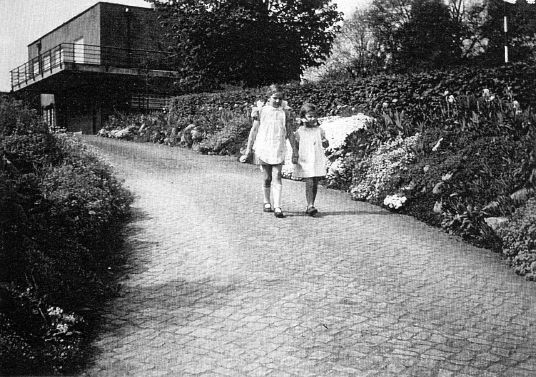
The daughters Bärbel and Christine Wolf walking in the garden of the villa

The building was commissioned in 1925 by the cloth and textile manufacturer Erich Wolf (1883–1958). He increased his wealth by marrying Elisabeth Wilke (1894–1987), who in turn had inherited a hat factory, in 1922. He had chosen an elevation in Guben as the building site, from which one had an overview of the industrial plants running along the Neisse. The narrow hillside plot ran along Teichbornstraße (today ulica Krolewska) and Grüne Wiese (today ulica Piastowska).

With the advance of the Red Army in World War II the family fled in 1945. They left everything behind, the building burnt down and was not rebuilt. The remaining building materials were used for the reconstruction of buildings in Gubin. In the 1960s, the land was apparently leveled. The area was greened and integrated into the newly created Waszkiewicz Park in 1977.

From 2001 onwards, on the initiative of the Internationale Bauausstellung Fürst-Pückler-Land under the direction of Lars Scharnholz of the Brandenburg University of Technology (BTU), the foundations were excavated and then measured and documented by the Museum of Modern Art. Further investigations with ground-penetrating radar are planned in order to determine the structure of the building in more detail. In 2006, a "Mies-Memory-Box" in Gubin provided information about the building with historical photographs as well as shard remains from the Wolf's porcelain collection. It was subsequently shown in Wrocław, Berlin, Dessau and Stuttgart. Today marks on the ground in the park are reminders of the villa.

Following the idea of the city planner Florian Mausbach, a German-Polish initiative is striving to reconstruct the building. The Government of Poland signaled its support in 2019.

== Architecture ==
The plans for the building envisaged a simple cubic, red-black clad clinker brick building with an asymmetrical design of flat cuboids of different sizes. The house had around over 1000 m^{2}. The facade and interior walls were clad with flat ashlars. The front of the house was oriented to the west, the entrance was on the east side. The building had a "treasure chamber" to house the Wolf collection of art and paintings as well as a sculpture collection. The open interiors were laid out to interplay with the nature outside. Spacious terraces took up the feeling of space, which was to become a characteristic of the architect's later buildings of openness and flow. However, Mies designed not only the building shell, but also objects for the interior decoration.

After completion the facades were bare. Vines were planted afterwards along it.

Mies donated the original pencil drawings and sketches to the Museum of Modern Art in New York. The museum also has a scale model created in 2001 that was shown in various exhibitions.

== Images ==
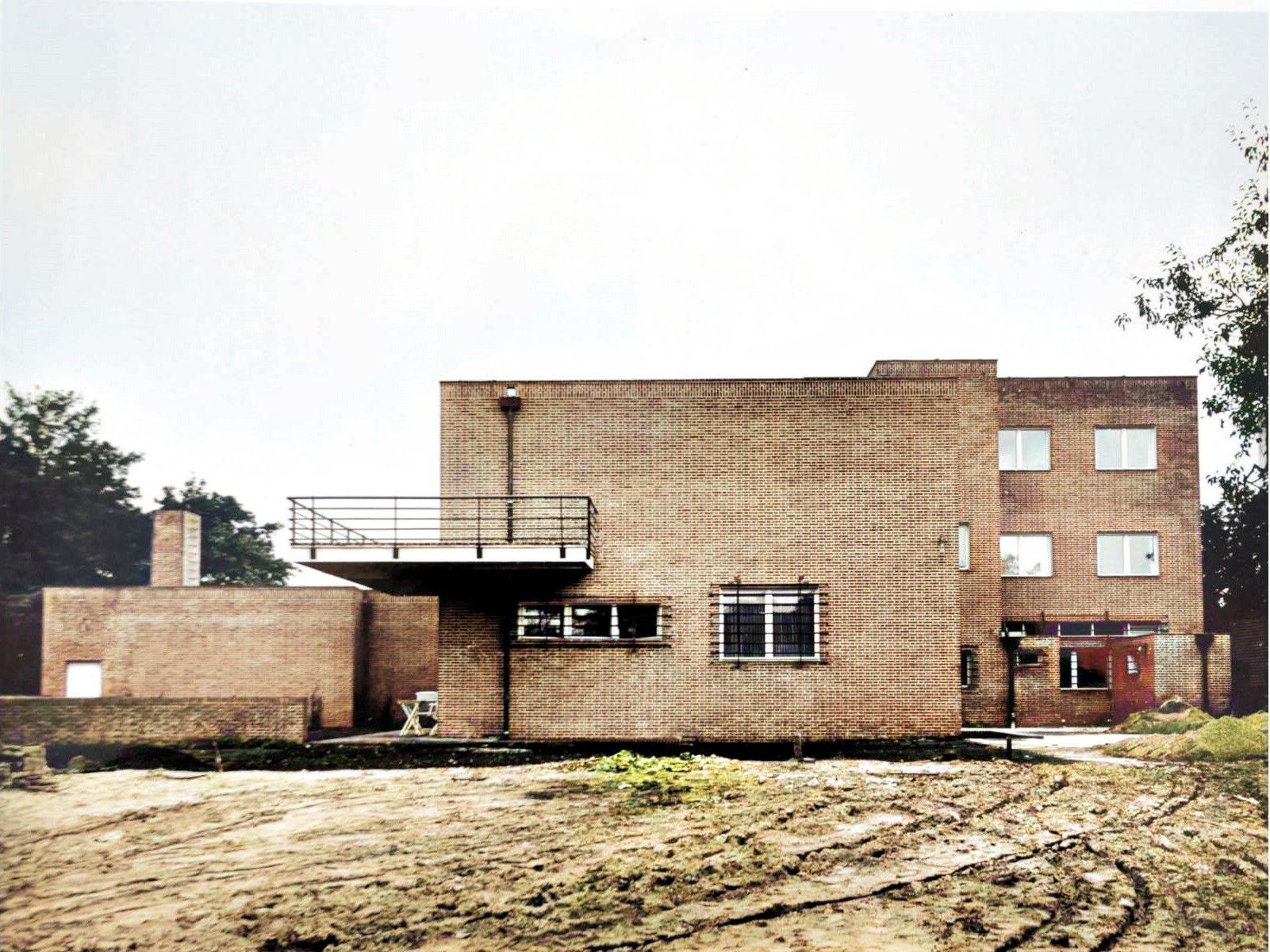
View from the street shortly after completion

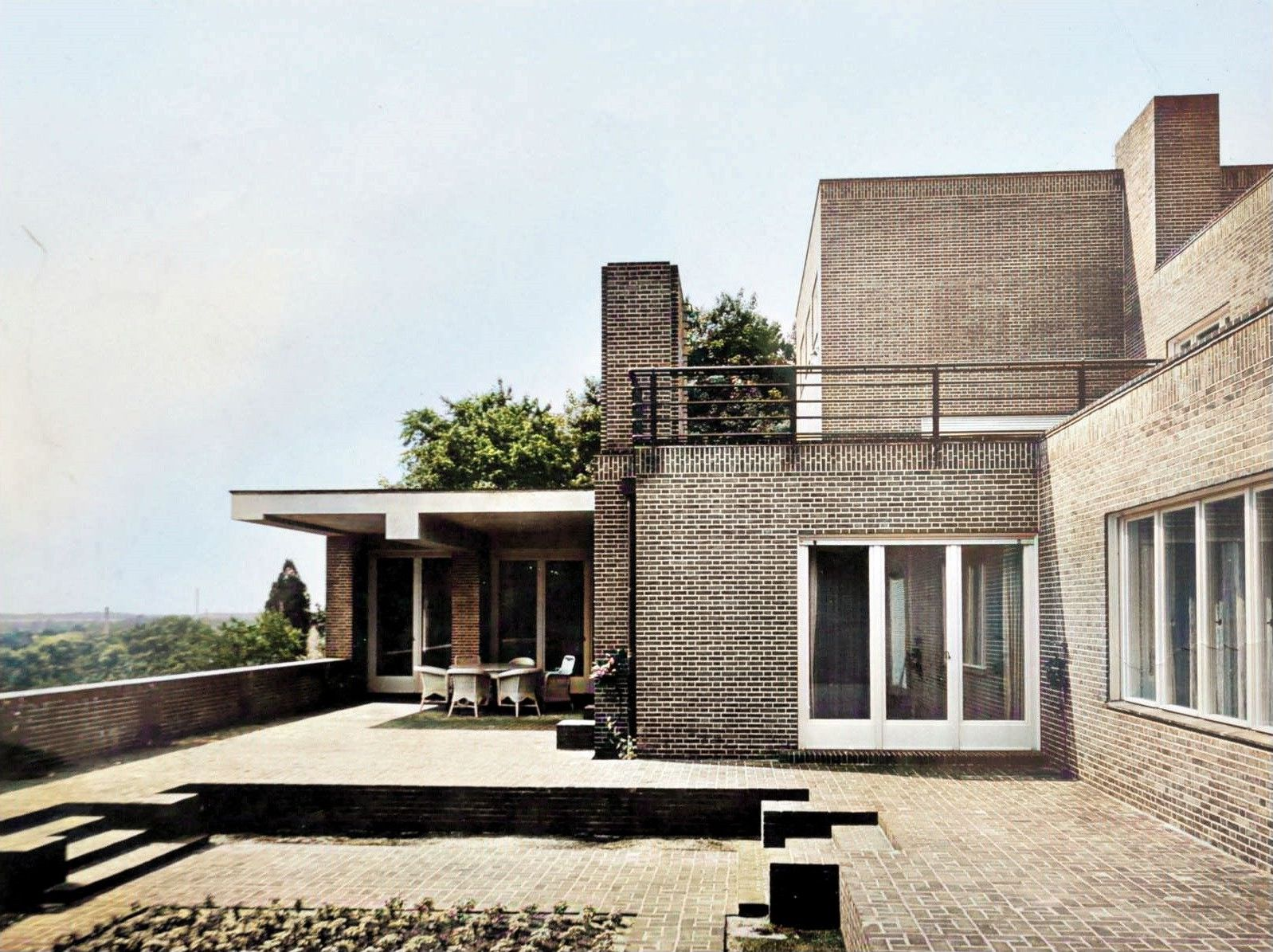
Patio

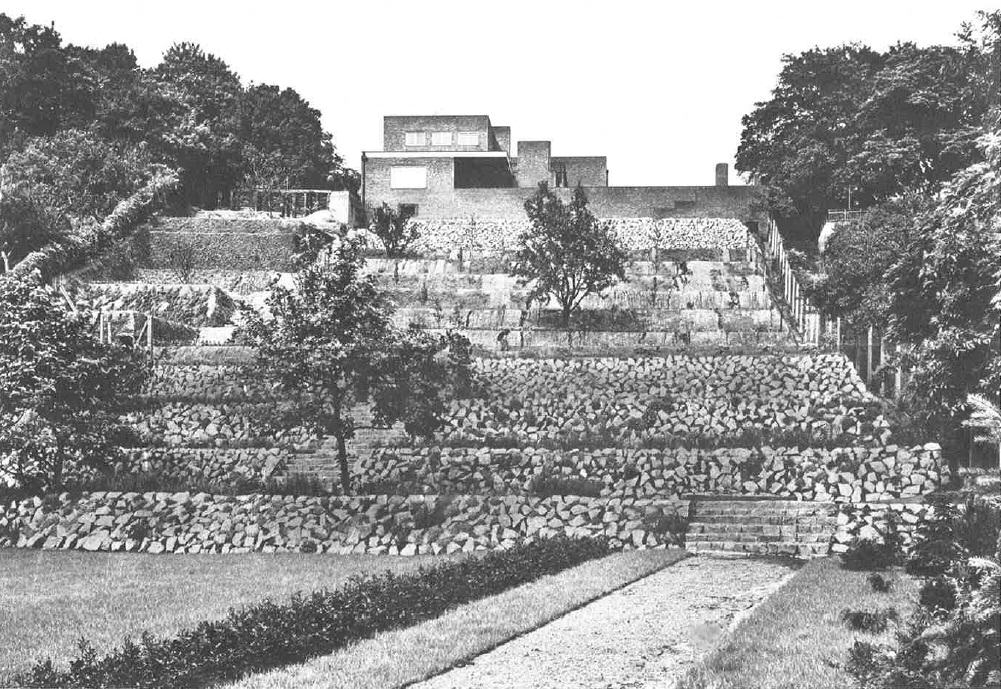
View from the river towards the terraced gardens

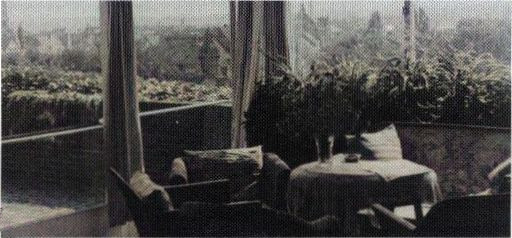
Interior towards patio

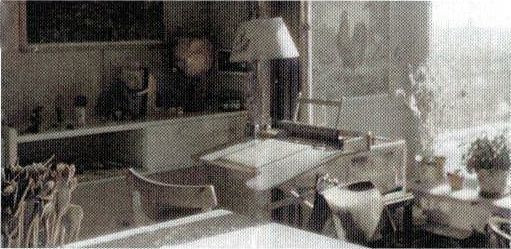
one of the rooms

== See also ==
- Haus Lange and Haus Esters in Krefeld
- Villa Tugendhat in Brno
- Villa Cavrois in Croix

== Bibliography ==
- Scharnholz, Lars, ed. (2002). The Wolf House Project. Studies & Design. Cottbus: Internationale Bauausstellung (IBA). ISBN 3-9806704-6-5.
- Schmidt, Leo, ed. (2001). The Wolf House Project. Traces/Spuren/Ślady. Cottbus: Brandenburgische Technische Universität. ISBN 3-9807583-3-8.
- Blakwood, M. (Director). (1985). Mies [Motion Picture].
- Cohen, J.-L. (1996). Mies Van der Rohe. London: E & FN Spon.
- Davies, C. (2006). Wolf House. In C. Davies, Key Houses of the Twentieth Century- Plans, Sections and Elevations (pp. 58–59). London: Laurence King Publisher.
- Franz Schulze, i. a. (1989). Mies Van der Rohe, A Critical Biography. Chicago: University of Chicago Press.
