= Jaracz (surname) =

Jaracz is a Polish-language surname. Notable people with the surname include:

- Barbara Jaracz (born 1977), Polish chess Woman Grandmaster
- Paweł Jaracz (born 1975), Polish chess Grandmaster
- Stefan Jaracz (1883–1945), Polish actor and theater producer
- Thad Jaracz (born 1946), American basketball player

== See also ==
- Jaracz, Greater Poland Voivodeship, a settlement in Poland
