= Lubsza =

Lubsza may refer to:

- Lubsza (river), a river in Poland
- Lubsza, Opole Voivodeship (south-west Poland)
- Lubsza, Silesian Voivodeship (south Poland)
