= Guben =

Town in Brandenburg, Germany

Guben Gubin
- Town
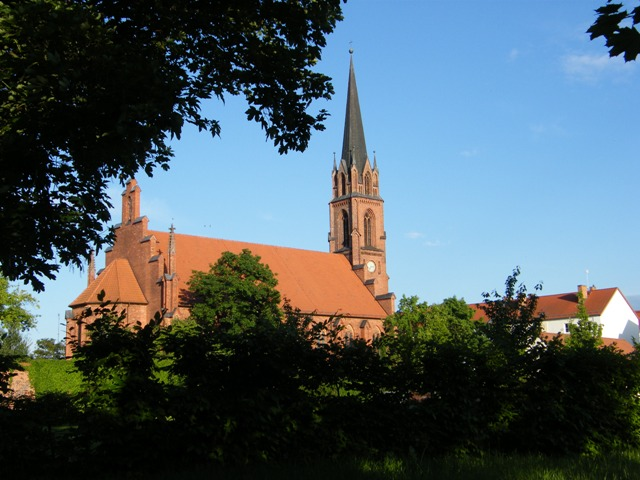
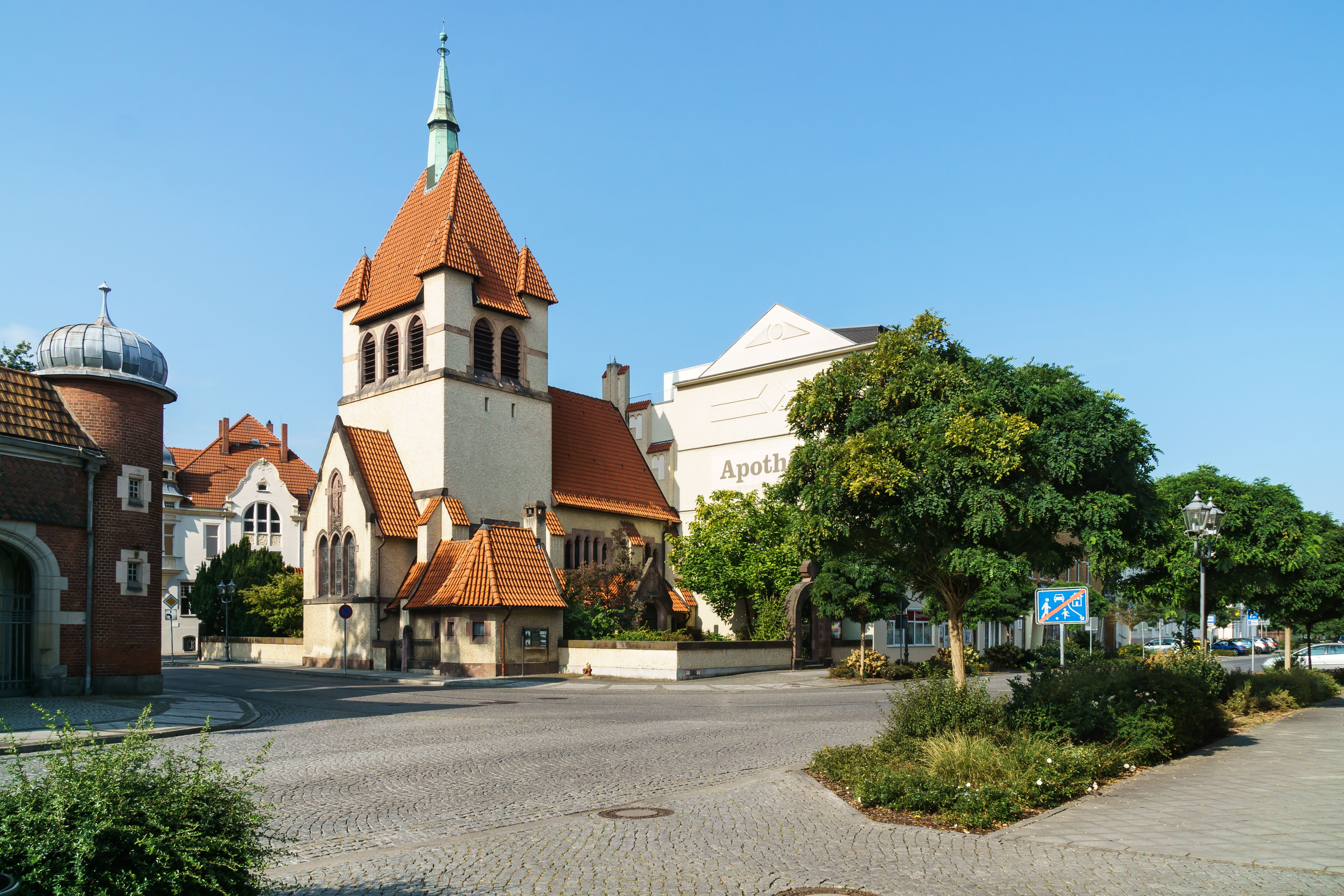
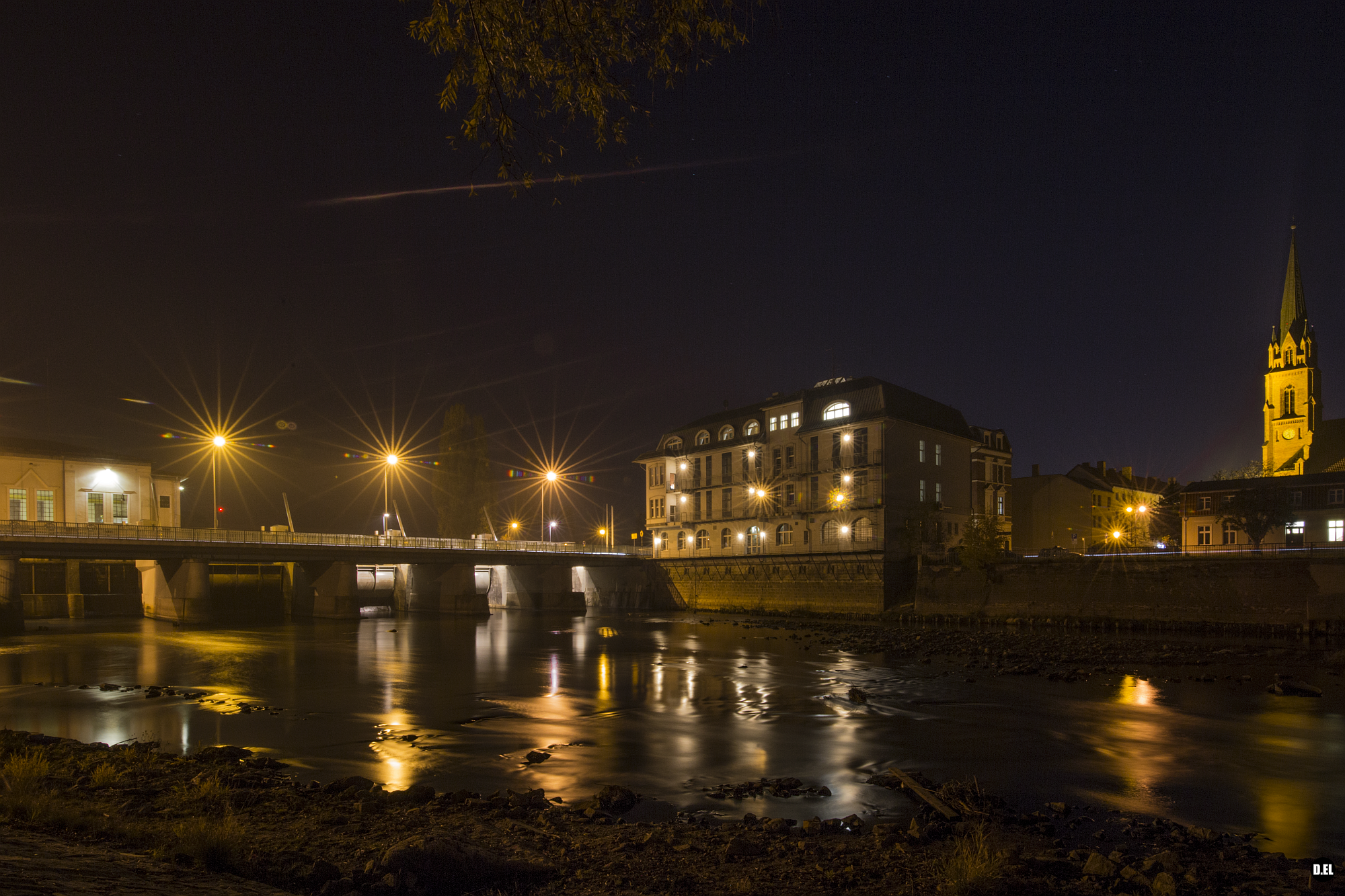
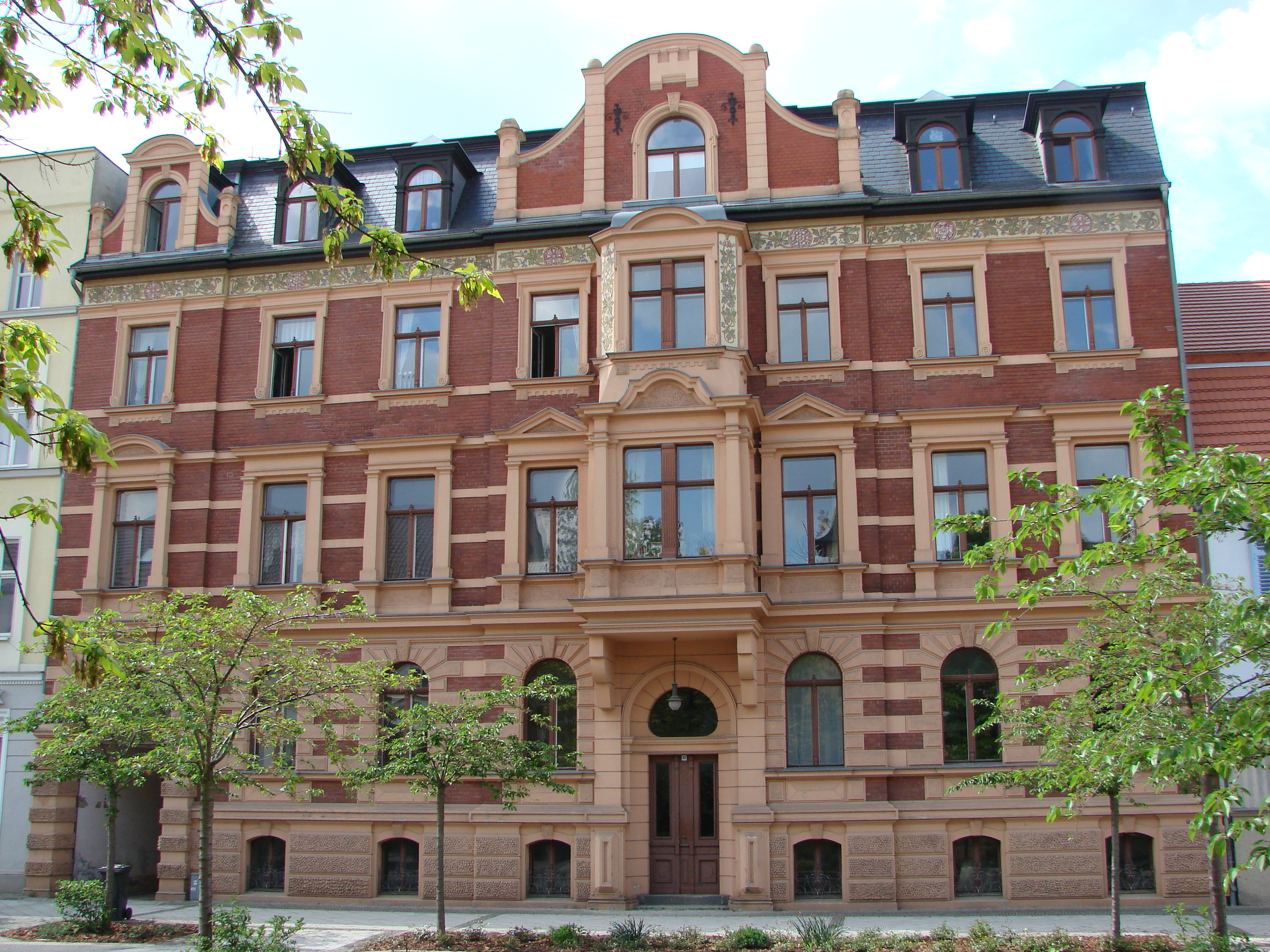
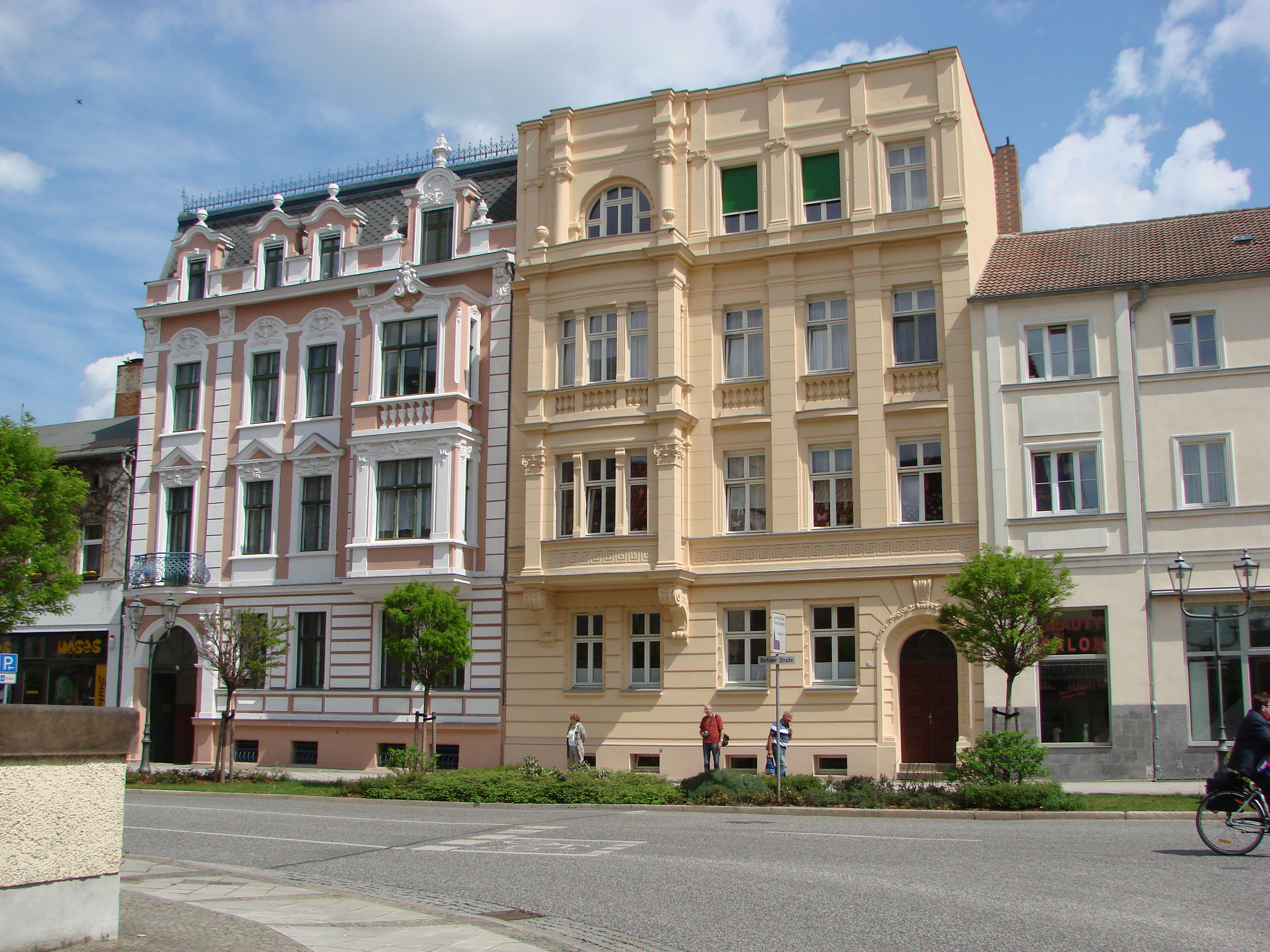
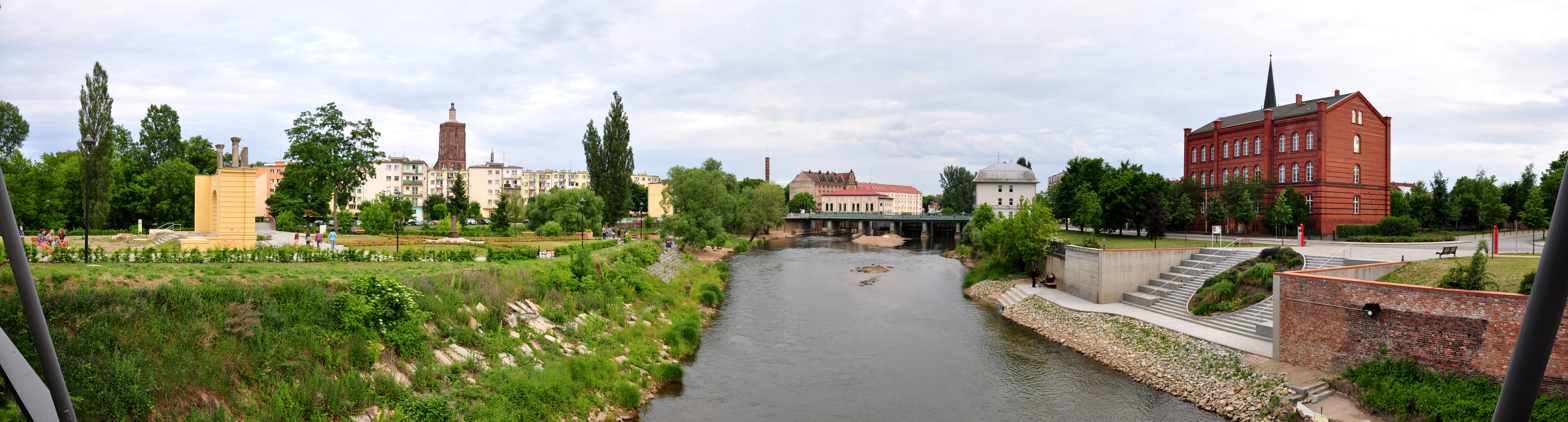
- From top: Klosterkirche; Good Shepherd church Guben and Lusatian Neisse at night third row: old town houses Lusatian Neisse between Gubin and Guben

- Flag Coat of arms

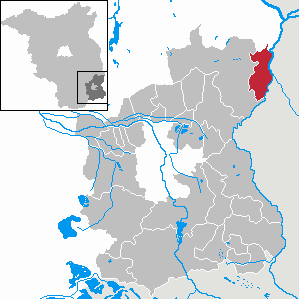
- Location of Guben; Gubin within Spree-Neiße district
- Interactive map of Guben; Gubin
- Location within Germany Location within Brandenburg
- Coordinates: 51°57′12″N 14°43′00″E
- Country: Germany
- State: Brandenburg
- District: Spree-Neiße
- Subdivisions: 4 Stadtteile, 5 Ortsteile

Government
  - Mayor (2018–26): Fred Mahro (CDU)

Area
  - Total: 43.99 km^{2} (16.98 sq mi)
- Elevation: 45 m (148 ft)

Population (2025-12-31)
  - Total: 15,613
  - Density: 354.9/km^{2} (919.2/sq mi)
- Time zone: UTC+01:00 (CET)
  - Summer (DST): UTC+02:00 (CEST)
- Postal codes: 03172
- Dialling codes: 03561
- Vehicle registration: SPN, FOR, GUB, SPB
- Website: www.guben.de

Guben (German pronunciation: [ˈɡuːbn̩]; Polish and Sorbian: Gubin) is a town on the Lusatian Neisse river in Lower Lusatia, in the state of Brandenburg, in eastern Germany. Located in the Spree-Neiße district, Guben has a population of 20,049. It is a divided city on the border between Germany and Poland, having been separated into Guben and Gubin by the Oder–Neisse line in 1945.

== Geography ==
=== Environment ===
Guben is located in the district (Landkreis) of Spree-Neiße in the southeast of the state of Brandenburg. It is in the historical region of Lower Lusatia. Guben's position on the banks of the Lusatian Neisse between two plateaus was advantageous in its early economic development. These plateaus developed from ground moraines of the Weichselian glaciation period. Both the western (Kaltenborner Berge = Kaltenborn Hills) and eastern (Gubener Berge = Guben Hills) ended up as terminal moraines. The surrounding land is covered with pine forests and lakes.

=== Districts ===
Guben is divided into the unofficial sections of:

- Altstadt, formerly to 1945 Klostervorstadt (developed from the early Benedictine cloister area, which developed into the industrial suburb of pre-division Guben)
- Sprucke (originally Vorwerk Altsprucke, added after 1920 with quarter Neusprucke and after 1963 with quarter Obersprucke)
- Reichenbach

Guben is divided into the official districts (with district mayors) of:

- Bresinchen
- Deulowitz
- Groß Breesen (with Grunewald)
- Kaltenborn
- Schlagsdorf

== Coat of arms ==
The coat of arms of Guben depicts a red wall with three gates (Klostertor, Crossener Tor, Werdertor) and three towers. The three inescutcheons depict the arms of the historic rulers: the Kings of Prussia, the Kings of Bohemia, and the Electors of Saxony. The coat of arms of the Polish sister city Gubin features a Piast Eagle inescutcheon instead.

== History ==
=== Medieval and early modern period ===
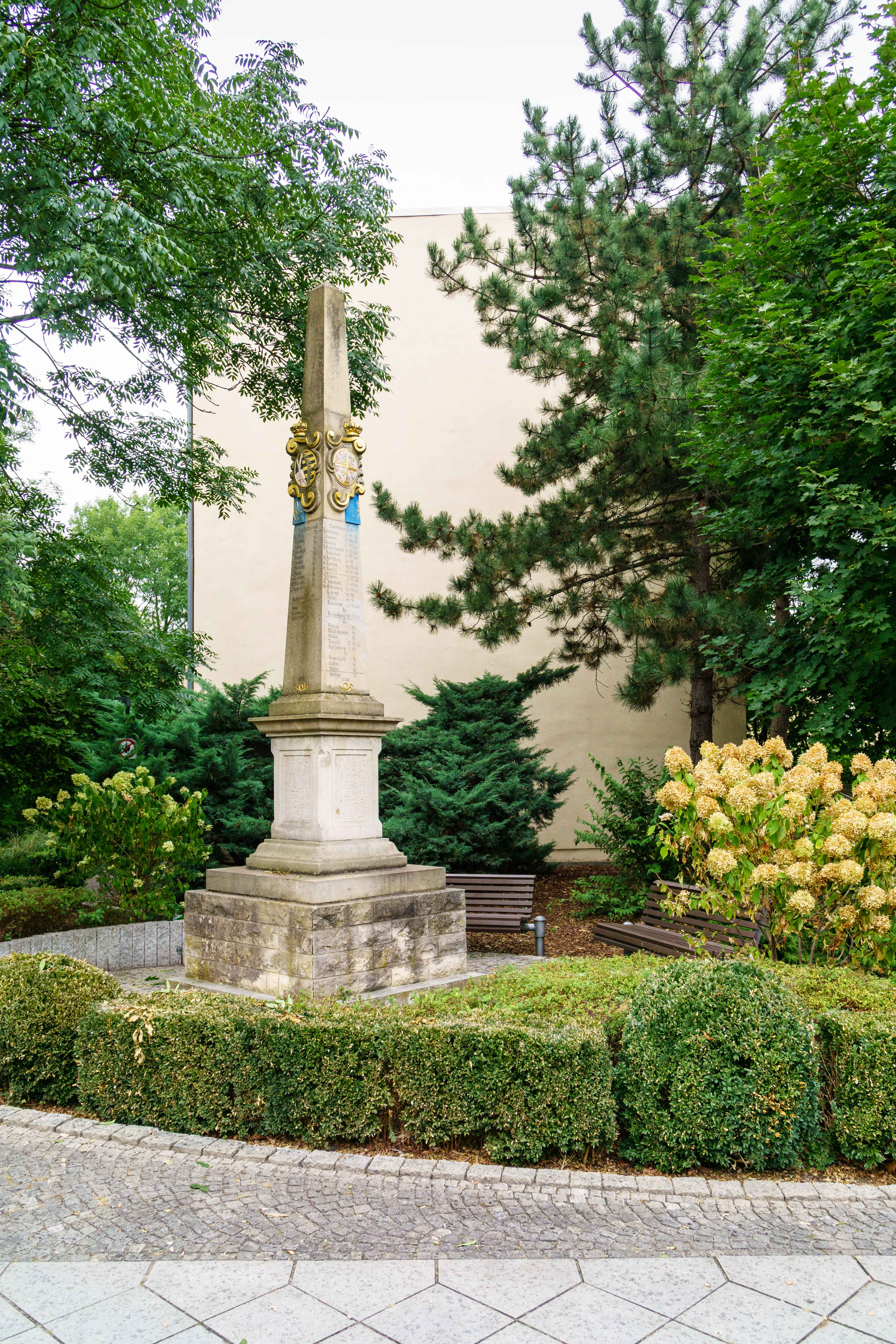
Post milestone from 1736 with the coat of arms the Polish–Lithuanian Commonwealth and Electorate of Saxony

The trade settlement existed since the 11th century. In the early 11th century it became part of the early Polish state under Bolesław I the Brave, and later it fell to the March of Lusatia. Gubin began to develop around 1200 as a trade and marketplace on the roads between Leipzig and Poznań and between Görlitz and Frankfurt (Oder).

In the early 13th century it was part of the Duchy of Silesia within fragmented Piast-ruled Poland, and it was mentioned under the name Gubin in a document of Duke Henry the Bearded in 1211. Lost by Poland in 1224, afterwards it often changed affiliation. A settlement on the eastern shore of the Lusatian Neisse was protected by swamps to the south and by the Lubsza, a tributary of the Neisse, to the north and the east. Henry III, Margrave of Meissen, granted this settlement Magdeburg rights on 1 June 1235, and declared it an oppidum (town). On the western shore of the river, a cloister of Benedictine nuns began developing as an outlying suburb of the town on the eastern shore of the river. In a charter of 1312 Guben received its coat of arms displaying three towers. In 1319 the town was unsuccessfully besieged by King John of Bohemia, and afterwards it fell to the Dukes of Saxe-Wittenberg, before it was captured by House of Wittelsbach in 1324. It was regained by the Silesian Piasts in 1362, and in 1364 and 1367 Duke Bolko II the Small confirmed old privileges of Guben.

In 1368 the town passed to the Kingdom of Bohemia, in 1469 it passed under Hungarian suzerainty, and in 1490 it fell back to Bohemia. The town was fortified in the 14th century with earthworks, trenches, and wooden planking, and then refortified from 1523 to 1544. In 1635 Elector John George I of Saxony received Lower Lusatia and Guben in the Peace of Prague.

=== Growth of economy and infrastructure ===
Guben's textile industry began to develop in the 16th century, although it began to flourish in the 19th century, especially with leather gloves in 1849. Beginning in 1822, Guben's production of hats covered 65% of German demand. Later industrialization led to the production of rugs and shoes. Lignite processing began in the eastern half of the city in 1847. The tradition for weaving is still prevalent in modern times as the textile company Trevira maintains a manufacturing plant in the city.

Guben station was opened with the railway between Frankfurt (Oder) and Breslau (Wrocław) in 1846 and the Cottbus–Guben railway was opened in 1871. A direct line to Forst (Lausitz) was finished in 1904, and a tram line ran in the city from 24 February 1904 until 8 June 1938.

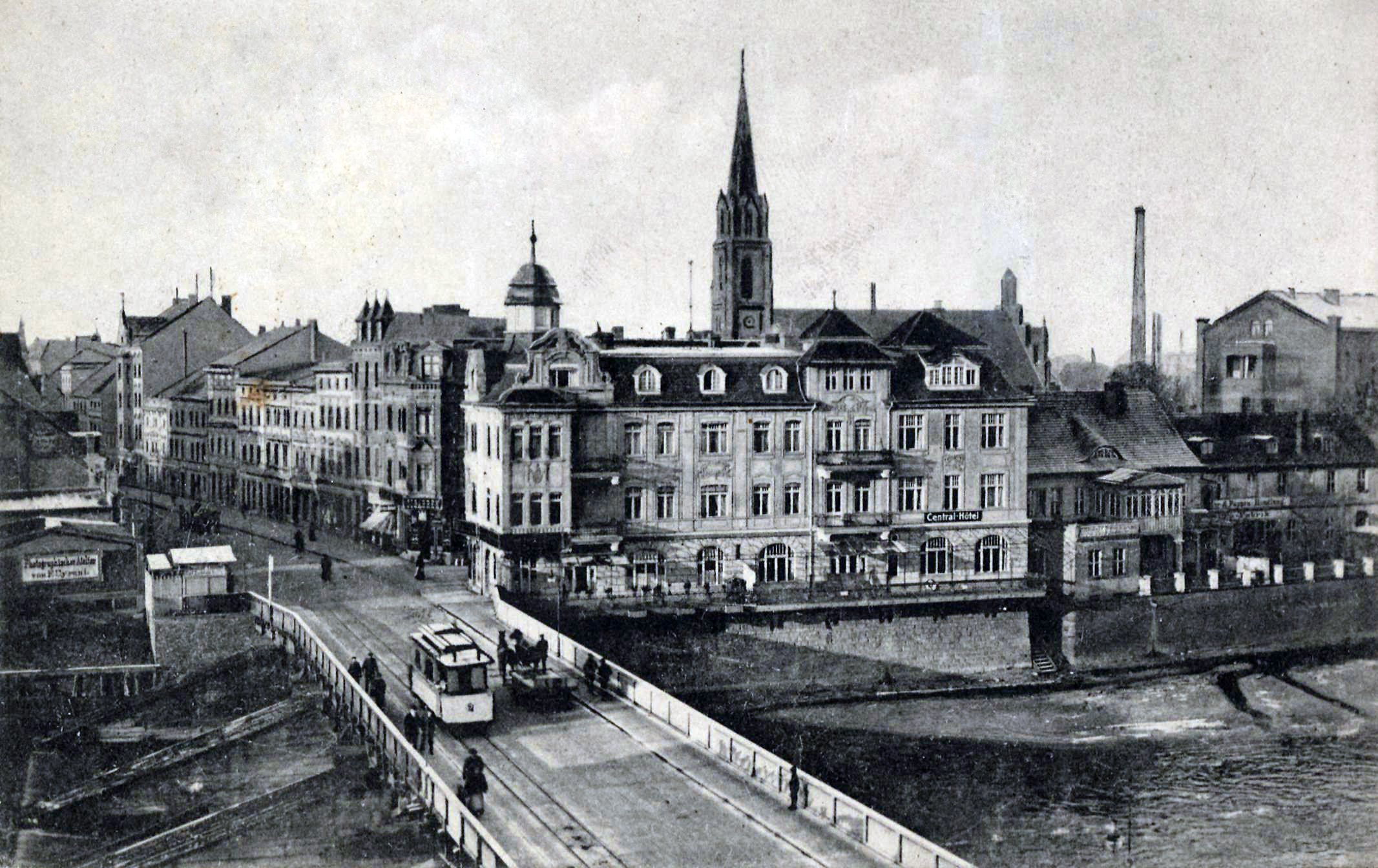
Guben c. 1920

In 1815 the Margravate of Lower Lusatia was abolished and replaced with the district system. Guben became the capital of a district within the Province of Brandenburg. On 1 April 1884 the city of Guben separated from the district of Guben and became its own urban district. On 1 December 1928 the region of Mückenberg was incorporated from the district of Guben into the city of Guben.

Most recently the Anatomist Doctor Gunther von Hagens, from Heidelberg University where he developed many of his cadaver plastinating techniques, has purchased a disused woollens manufacturing factory. This has been renovated and converted into a museum-cum-work centre. He expects to employ approximately 200 people, which will have some impact on the local unemployment figures currently running at close to 20%

There have been some objections to this development on moral grounds, but the majority of the Guben's population see this development as a good thing for the future prosperity of Guben.

=== After World War II ===
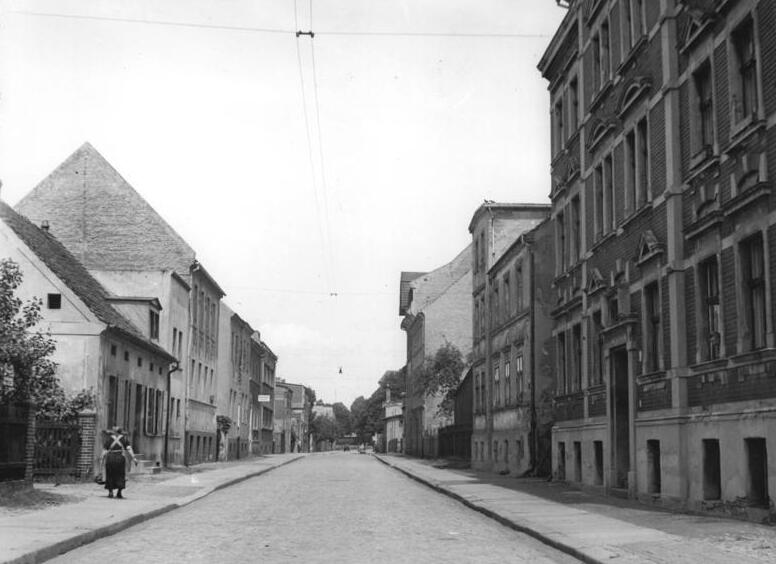
Guben, 1955

At the Potsdam Conference at the end of World War II in 1945, the boundary between Germany and Poland was fixed as the Oder–Neisse line. Because Guben was on the Lusatian Neisse, the city was separated into German Guben and Polish Gubin.

Because the historical center of Guben became Gubin, the western suburbs which grew from the Benedictine cloister remained in Guben. Although underdeveloped compared to the town across the river, the remaining Guben began to grow extensively after 1945, especially through the construction of a chemical plant and additional residential areas. From 1952 to 1990, Guben was part of the Bezirk Cottbus of East Germany. From 1961 to 1990 Guben was officially named "Wilhelm-Pieck-Stadt Guben" by East Germany after its first and only State President Wilhelm Pieck, who was born in the eastern half of the city (today's Gubin) in 1876. From June 1950 until 23 July 1952 Guben was part of the district of Cottbus.

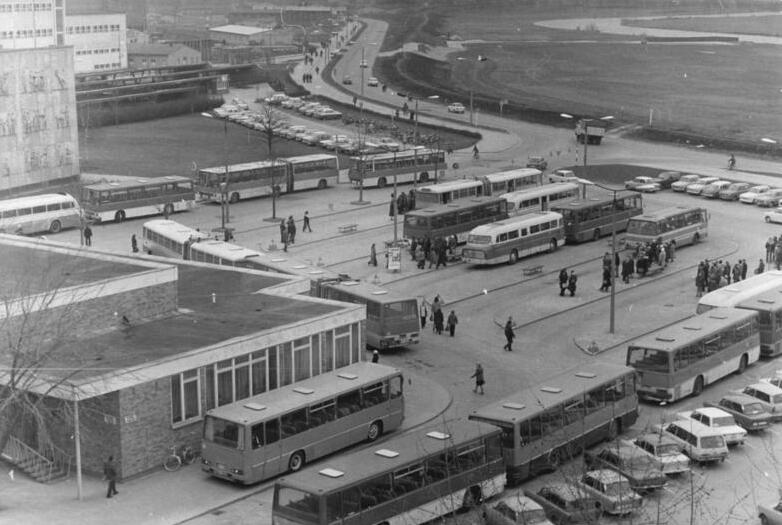
Guben, chemical plant 1980, shift change

=== Reunification ===
The German reunification in 1990 brought economic depression and unemployment to the city. When the district of Guben was abolished on 6 December 1993, Guben became part of the district of Spree-Neiße. In recent years the city has begun developing closer ties with Gubin across the river.

== Demography ==
The following is an overview of Guben's population. Until 1844 the population was mostly estimated, while afterwards the figures are from census results.

Development of population since 1875 within the current Boundaries (Blue Line: Population; Dotted Line: Comparison to Population development in Brandenburg state; Grey Background: Time of Nazi Germany; Red Background: Time of communist East Germany)

Recent Population Development and Projections (Population Development before Census 2011 (blue line); Recent Population Development according to the Census in Germany in 2011 (blue bordered line); Official projections for 2005-2030 (yellow line); for 2017-2030 (scarlet line); for 2020-2030 (green line)

Guben: Population development
within the current boundaries (2020)

Year	Pop.	±% p.a.
1875	9,496	—
1890	11,480	+1.27%
1910	14,438	+1.15%
1925	15,018	+0.26%
1939	16,671	+0.75%
1950	26,802	+4.41%
1964	26,197	−0.16%

Year	Pop.	±% p.a.
1971	30,231	+2.07%
1981	37,234	+2.11%
1985	35,262	−1.35%
1990	33,177	−1.21%
1995	29,093	−2.59%
2000	25,245	−2.80%
2005	21,341	−3.30%

Year	Pop.	±% p.a.
2010	19,320	−1.97%
2015	17,616	−1.83%
2016	17,471	−0.82%
2017	17,174	−1.70%
2018	16,933	−1.40%
2019	16,783	−0.89%
2020	16,656	−0.76%

== Notable people ==
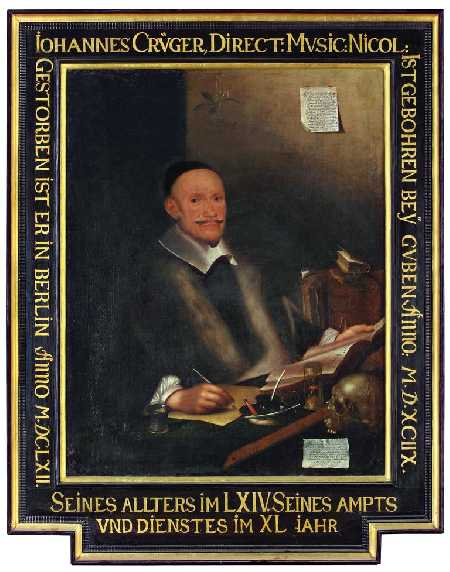
Johann Crüger

- Johann Crüger (1598–1662), hymns composer, cantor in Berlin (St. Nicolai)
- Johann Franck (1618–1677), lawyer, mayor of Guben, hymns poet
- Corona Schröter (1751–1802), musician and singer who was a close confidant of Johann von Goethe
- Johann Samuel Schröter (1753–1788), composer
- Ludwig von Falkenhausen (1844–1936), Colonel General, 1917–1918 Governor General in Belgium
- Alexander Tschirch (1856–1939), a pharmacologist in Bern, Switzerland
- Ludwig von Reuter (1869–1943), Admiral of the Imperial Navy, commanded 1919. sinking in Scapa Flow
- Wilhelm Pieck (1876–1960), politician (KPD, SED) member of the Reichstag, President of the GDR
- Heinrich Gaedcke (1905–1992), officer in the Reichswehr, Wehrmacht and Bundeswehr
- Gerhard Pohl (1937–2012), engineer, politician and Minister of Economy of the GDR
- Barbara Dittus (1939–2001), actress
- Danilo Hondo (born 1974), cyclist, German Champion 2002
- Ska Keller (born 1981), politician (The Greens), Member of European Parliament
- Katja Hoyer (born 1985), historian and writer

== Twin towns ==
Guben is twinning with the following towns:

- Cittadella, Italy
- Gubin, Poland
- Laatzen, Germany

== See also ==
- Guben station, Guben Central
- Vettersfelde Treasure, historic gold treasure
