= Nová Ves nad Nisou =

- Municipality
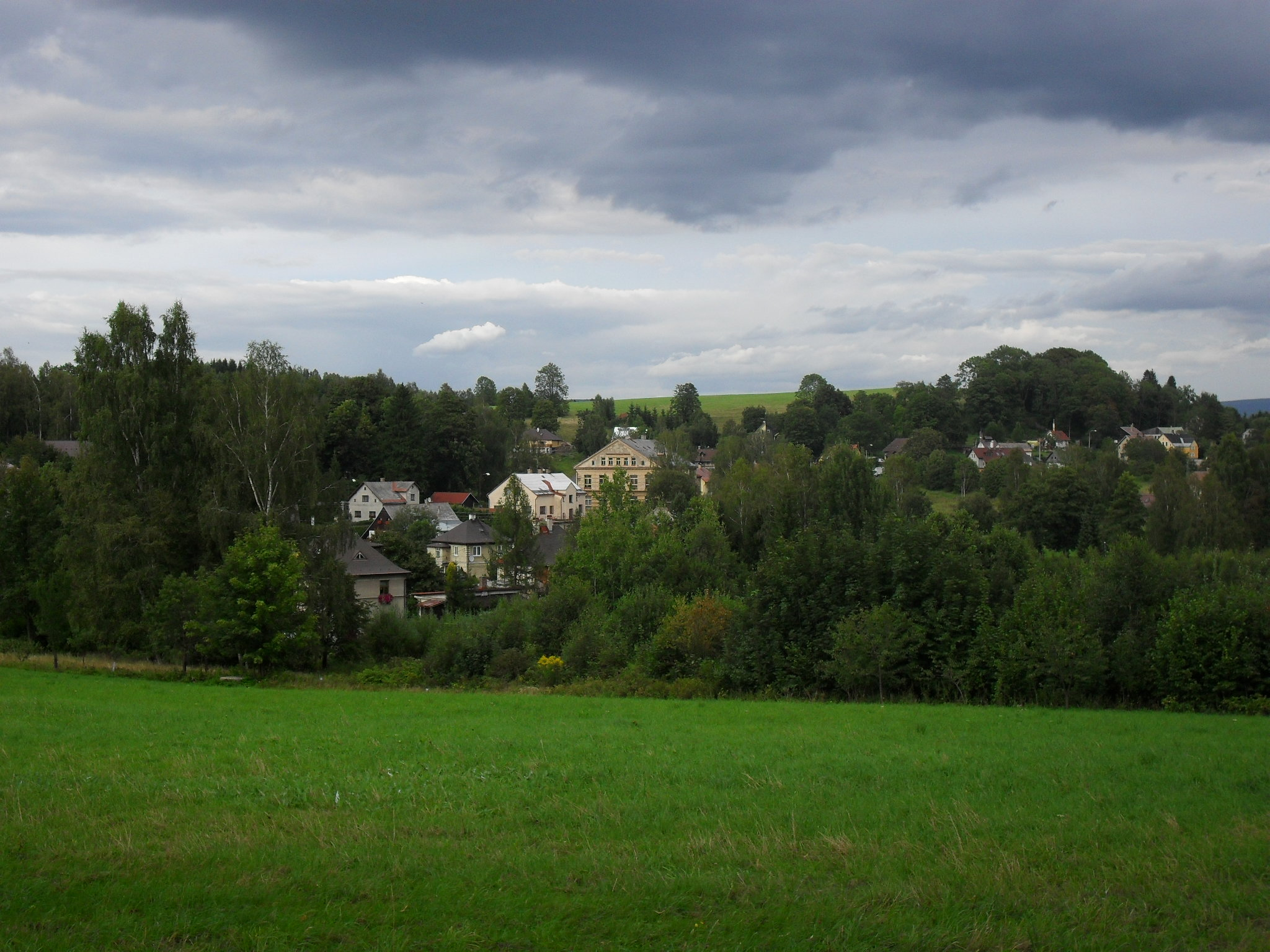
- View from the south

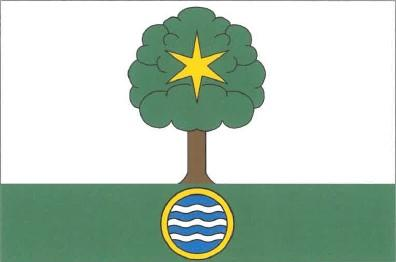
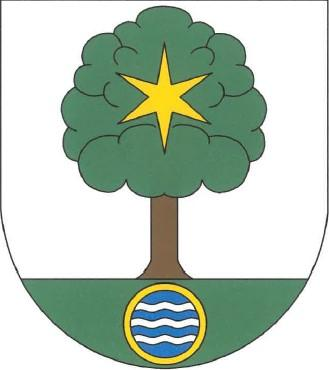
- Flag Coat of arms

- Location in the Czech Republic
- Coordinates: 50°43′31″N 15°12′53″E
- Country: Czech Republic
- Region: Liberec
- District: Jablonec nad Nisou
- First mentioned: 1634

Area
  - Total: 4.71 km^{2} (1.82 sq mi)
- Elevation: 595 m (1,952 ft)

Population (2026-01-01)
  - Total: 905
  - Density: 192/km^{2} (498/sq mi)
- Time zone: UTC+1 (CET)
  - Summer (DST): UTC+2 (CEST)
- Postal code: 468 27
- Website: www.novavesnn.cz

Nová Ves nad Nisou (German: Neudorf an der Neiße) is a municipality and village in Jablonec nad Nisou District in the Liberec Region of the Czech Republic. It has about 900 inhabitants. It lies in the Jizera Mountains.

== Administrative division ==
Nová Ves nad Nisou consists of two municipal parts (in brackets population according to the 2021 census):

- Nová Ves nad Nisou (786)
- Horní Černá Studnice (38)

== Etymology ==
The name means 'new village upon the Neisse'.

== Geography ==
Nová Ves nad Nisou is located about 2 kilometres (1 mi) east of Jablonec nad Nisou and 10 km (6 mi) east of Liberec. It lies in the Jizera Mountains. The highest point is a contour line on the slopes of the mountain Černá studnice at 834 m (2,736 ft) above sea level. The Lusatian Neisse river originates on the outskirts of the village.

== History ==
The first written mention of Nová Ves nad Nisou is from 1634. The village was probably founded in the second half of the 16th century by the Protestants from Saxony.

== Demographics ==
Historical population

Year	Pop.	±%
1869	1,503	—
1880	1,723	+14.6%
1890	1,800	+4.5%
1900	1,930	+7.2%
1910	2,084	+8.0%

Year	Pop.	±%
1921	1,819	−12.7%
1930	2,339	+28.6%
1950	952	−59.3%
1961	937	−1.6%
1970	859	−8.3%

Year	Pop.	±%
1980	723	−15.8%
1991	575	−20.5%
2001	609	+5.9%
2011	743	+22.0%
2021	824	+10.9%

Source: Censuses

== Economy ==
Nová Ves nad Nisou is a recreation centre. There are 200 houses of individual recreation and three larger guest houses.

== Transport ==
Nová Ves nad Nisou is located on the railway line Liberec–Szklarska Poręba.

== Sights ==
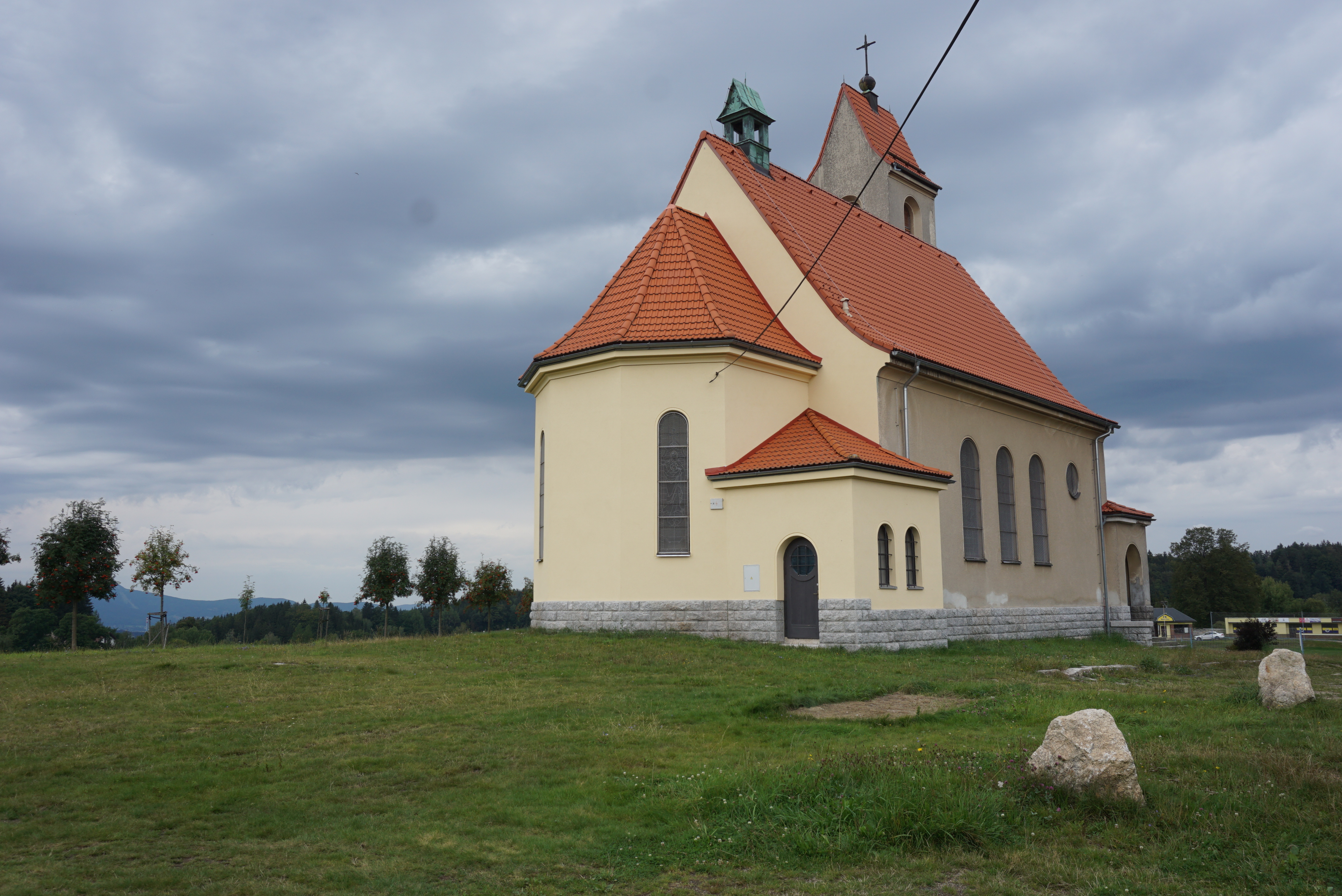
Church of Saint Mary of Help

The main landmark of Nová Ves nad Nisou is the Church of Saint Mary of Help. It was built in 1935.

A notable building is the Church of Gustav Adolf. It is a former Protestant church, also built in 1935.

A tourist destination is the Nysanka observation tower on a hill above the village of Nová Ves nad Nisou. It was opened in 2007.
