= Czesław Fiedorowicz =

Polish politician (born 1958)

member of Sejm 2005-2007
- In office 25 September 2005 – 2007

Personal details
- Born: 21 February 1958 (age 68) Gubin, Poland
- Party: Civic Platform

Czesław Fiedorowicz (Polish pronunciation: [ˈt͡ʂɛswaf fjɛdɔˈrɔvit͡ʂ]; born 21 February 1958) is a Polish politician. He was elected to the Sejm on 25 September 2005, getting 16,153 votes in 8 Zielona Góra district, as a candidate from the Civic Platform list.

He was also a member of the Sejm in 1993–1997 and again in 1997–2001.

== See also ==
- Members of Polish Sejm 2005–2007
