= Gubin, Poland =

Border town in Lubusz Voivodeship, Poland

Gubin
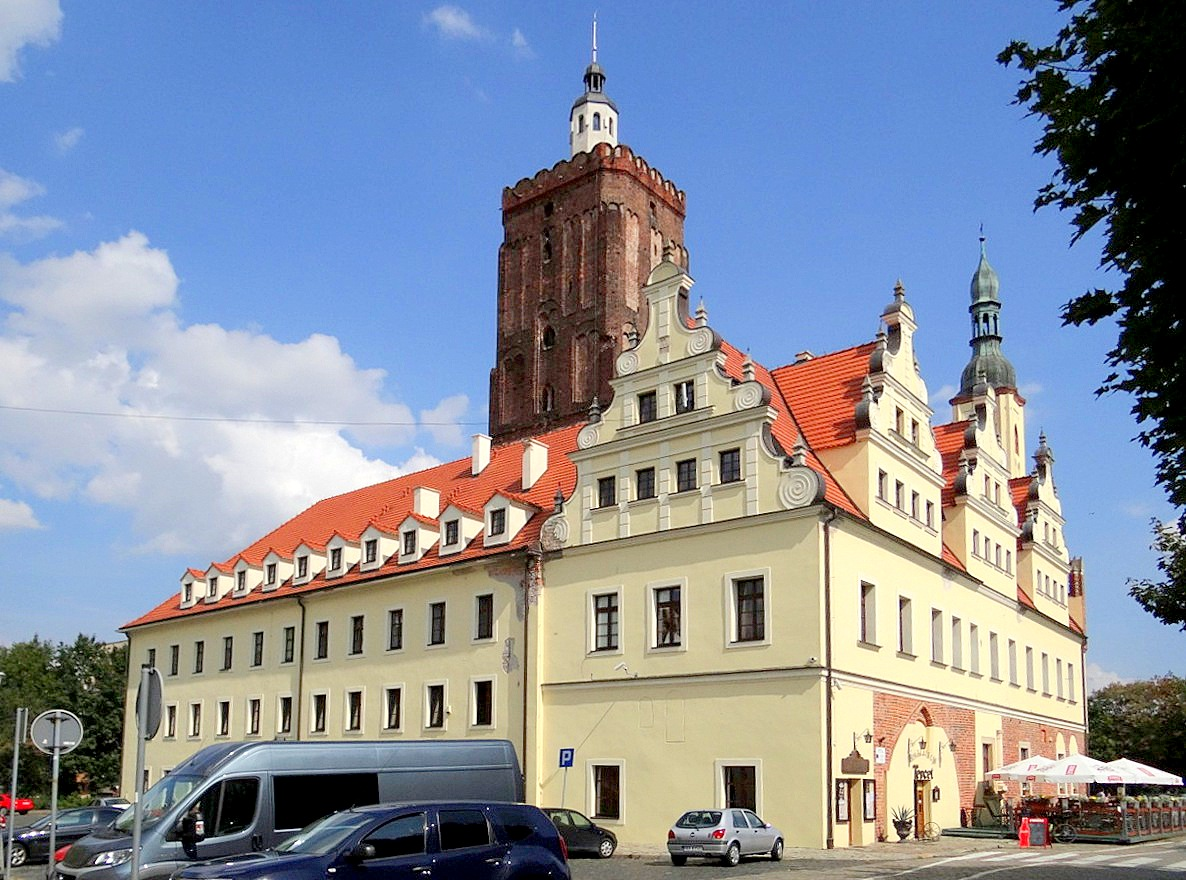
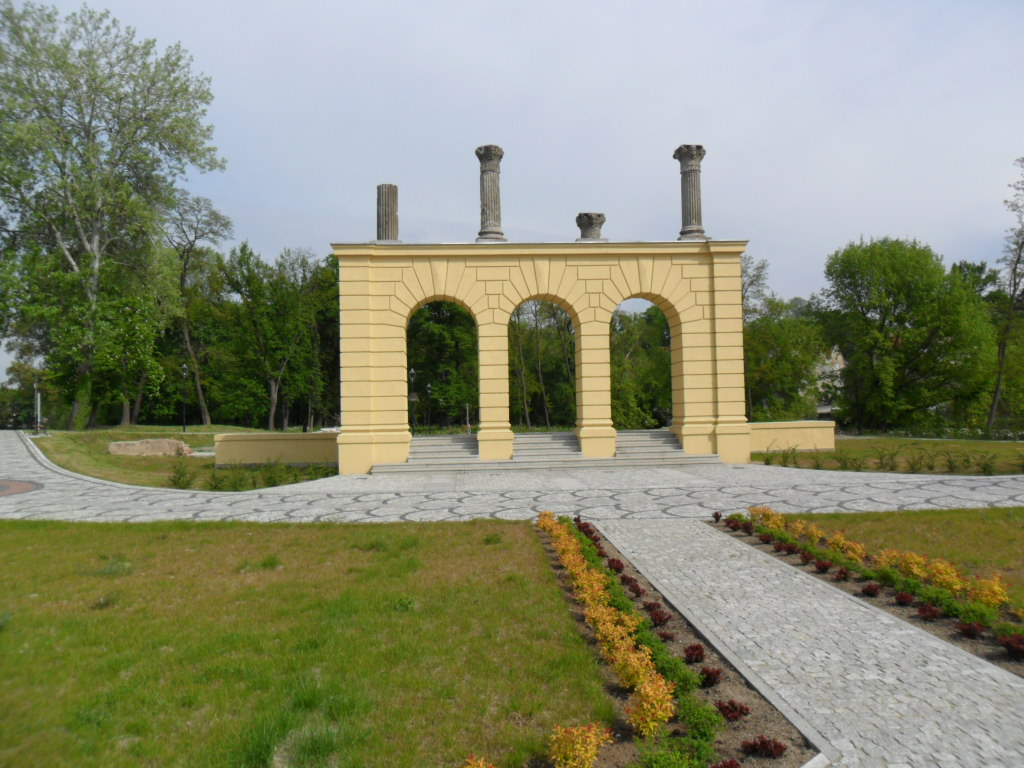
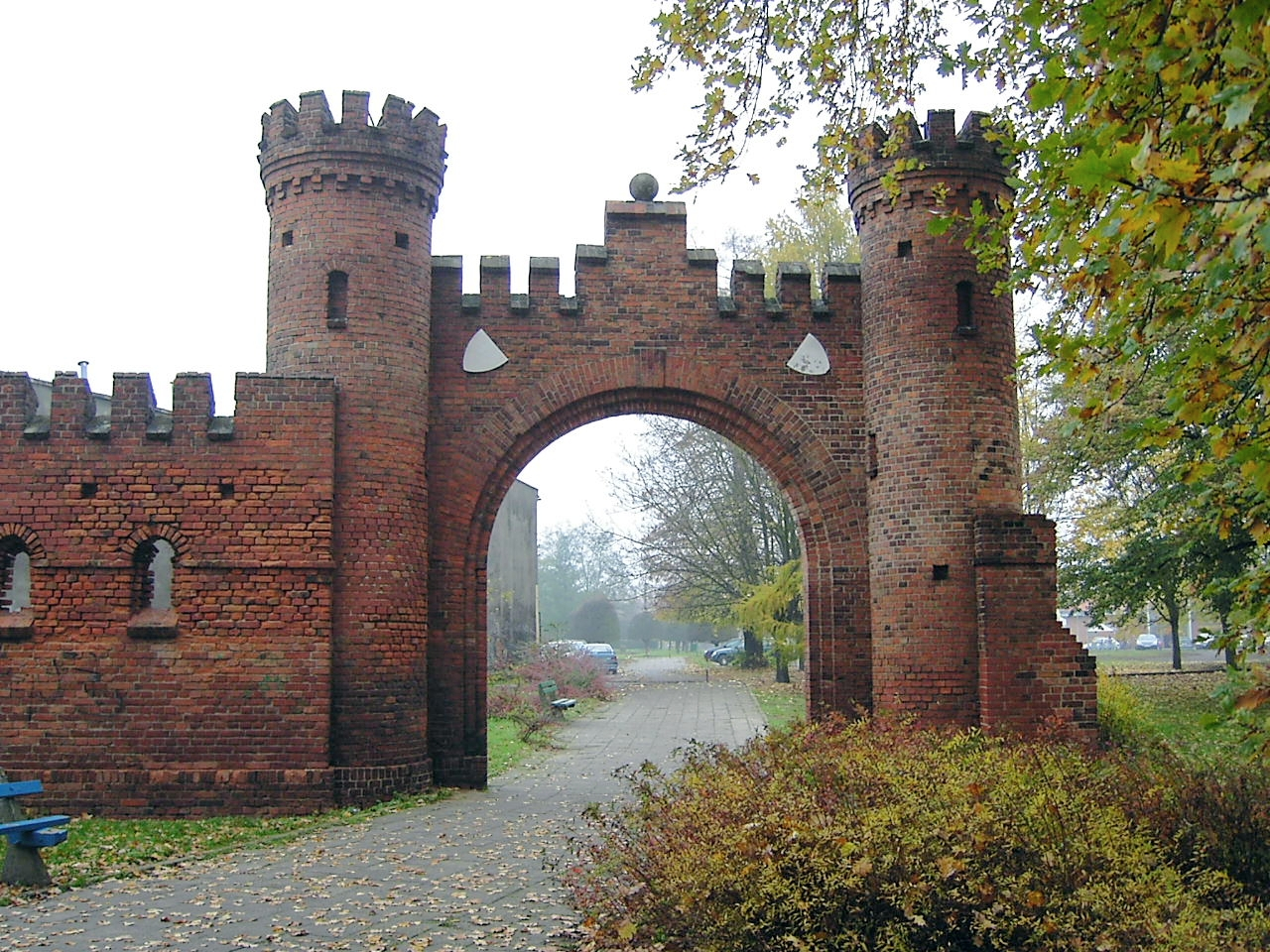
- Town hall Theatre Island Defensive walls

- Flag Coat of arms

- Location within Poland
- Coordinates: 51°57′N 14°43′E
- Country: Poland
- Voivodeship: Lubusz
- County: Krosno
- Gmina: Gubin (urban gmina)
- Established: 11th century
- Town rights: 1235

Government
  - Mayor: Zbigniew Bołoczko

Area
  - Total: 20.68 km^{2} (7.98 sq mi)

Population (2019-06-30)
  - Total: 16,619
  - Density: 803.6/km^{2} (2,081/sq mi)
- Time zone: UTC+1 (CET)
  - Summer (DST): UTC+2 (CEST)
- Postal code: 66-620
- Area code: +48 68
- Car plates: FKR
- Website: http://www.gubin.pl/

Gubin [ˈɡubʲin] (German: Guben) is a border town in Krosno County, Lubusz Voivodeship, in western Poland. It is the administrative seat of the rural Gmina Gubin, though not part of it.

Gubin is a town that developed from a medieval fortified stronghold into a local center of trade and crafts due to its location at the intersection of important trade routes, and once housed a royal mint. It is located on the right bank of the Lusatian Neisse river, at the border with Germany. The rail and road border crossings are connected with the German town of Guben, with which Gubin formed one city until its division by the Oder–Neisse line in 1945.

== Geography ==
Gubin is situated in the Polish part of the historic Lower Lusatia region, at the confluence of the Neisse and Lubsza rivers. It is located on the national road 32 operating as an orbital road for Gubin. It starts at the border crossing with Guben, runs to Krosno Odrzańskie and the regional capital Zielona Góra, and further leads to the national road 5 that connects Wrocław and Poznań. Gubin also has a railway border crossing on the line from Guben to Zbąszyń.

The municipal area of Gubin comprises 20.68 km^{2} (7.98 sq mi) of which 61% is used for agricultural purposes and 5% is used for forestry. The city takes up 1.5% of the area of the Krosno County.

== History ==
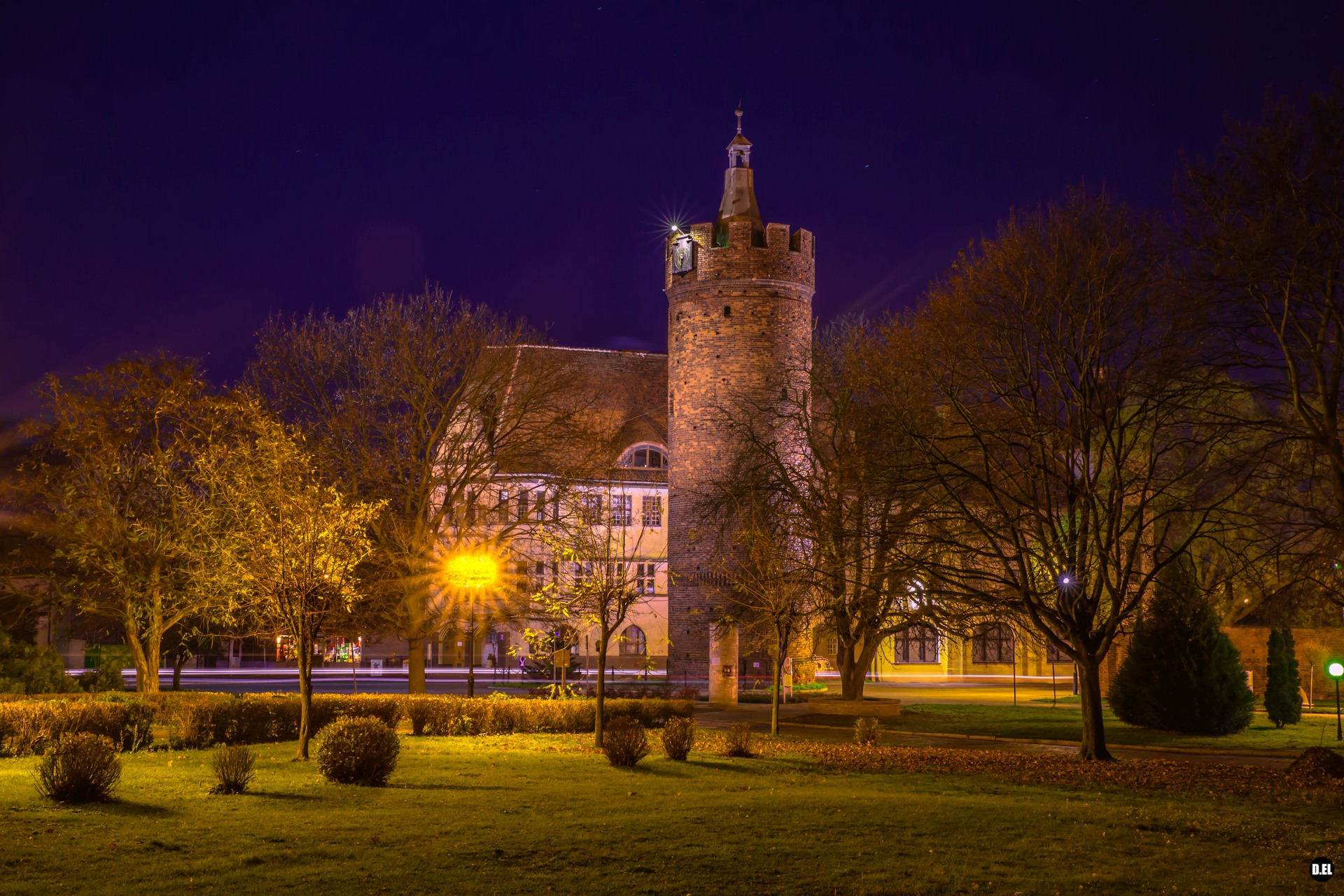
Medieval Ostrowska Gate Tower at night

The trade settlement existed since the 11th century. In the early 11th century it became part of the early Polish state under Bolesław I the Brave. There was a Polish defensive stronghold in Gubin, which was part of the first line of defense along the Lusatian Neisse, in the event of a possible German invasion from the west. Later it passed to the March of Lusatia. Gubin began to develop around 1200 as a trade and marketplace on the roads between Leipzig and Poznań and between Görlitz and Frankfurt (Oder). From the 13th century it was a center of clothmaking and wine trade. In the early 13th century it was part of the Duchy of Silesia within fragmented Piast-ruled Poland, and it was mentioned under the name Gubin in a document of Duke Henry the Bearded in 1211. Lost by Poland in 1224, afterwards it often changed affiliation. In the later centuries the name would be Germanized to Guben. Henry III, Margrave of Meissen, granted Magdeburg rights on June 1, 1235, and declared it an oppidum (town). In the 14th century the town hall was built.

In 1319 the town was unsuccessfully besieged by King John of Bohemia, and afterwards it fell to the Dukes of Saxe-Wittenberg, before it was captured by House of Wittelsbach in 1324. It was regained by the Silesian Piasts in 1362, and in 1364 and 1367 Duke Bolko II the Small confirmed old privileges of Gubin. From 1368 the town was part of the Kingdom of Bohemia, itself an Electorate of the Holy Roman Empire, in 1469 it passed under Hungarian suzerainty, and in 1490 it fell back to Bohemia, then ruled by the Jagiellonian dynasty, and from 1526 under the House of Habsburg. The town was visited by King of Poland Sigismund I the Old.

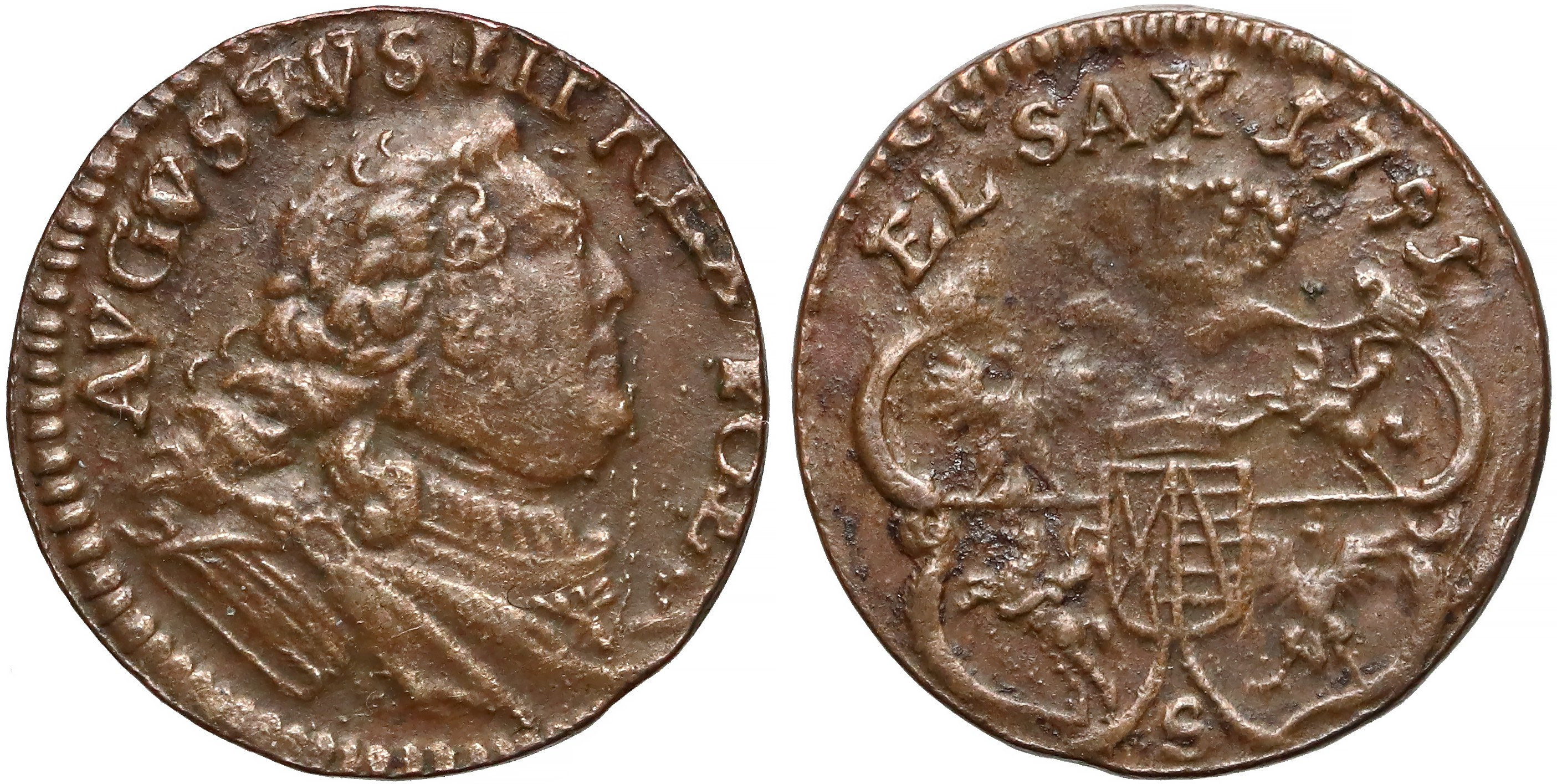
18th-century Polish coin from the local mint

In 1635, Elector John George I of Saxony received Lower Lusatia and Guben in the Peace of Prague. From 1697 in the Polish-Saxon personal union, it was visited by King Augustus II the Strong of Poland and Tsar Peter the Great of Russia. In 1751, Augustus III of Poland and Saxony established a mint in present-day Gubin, which produced Polish copper coins. After the Congress of Vienna in 1815, the Kingdom of Saxony ceded the town to the Kingdom of Prussia. Guben became the capital of a district within the Province of Brandenburg. In 1871, Guben became part of the German Empire.

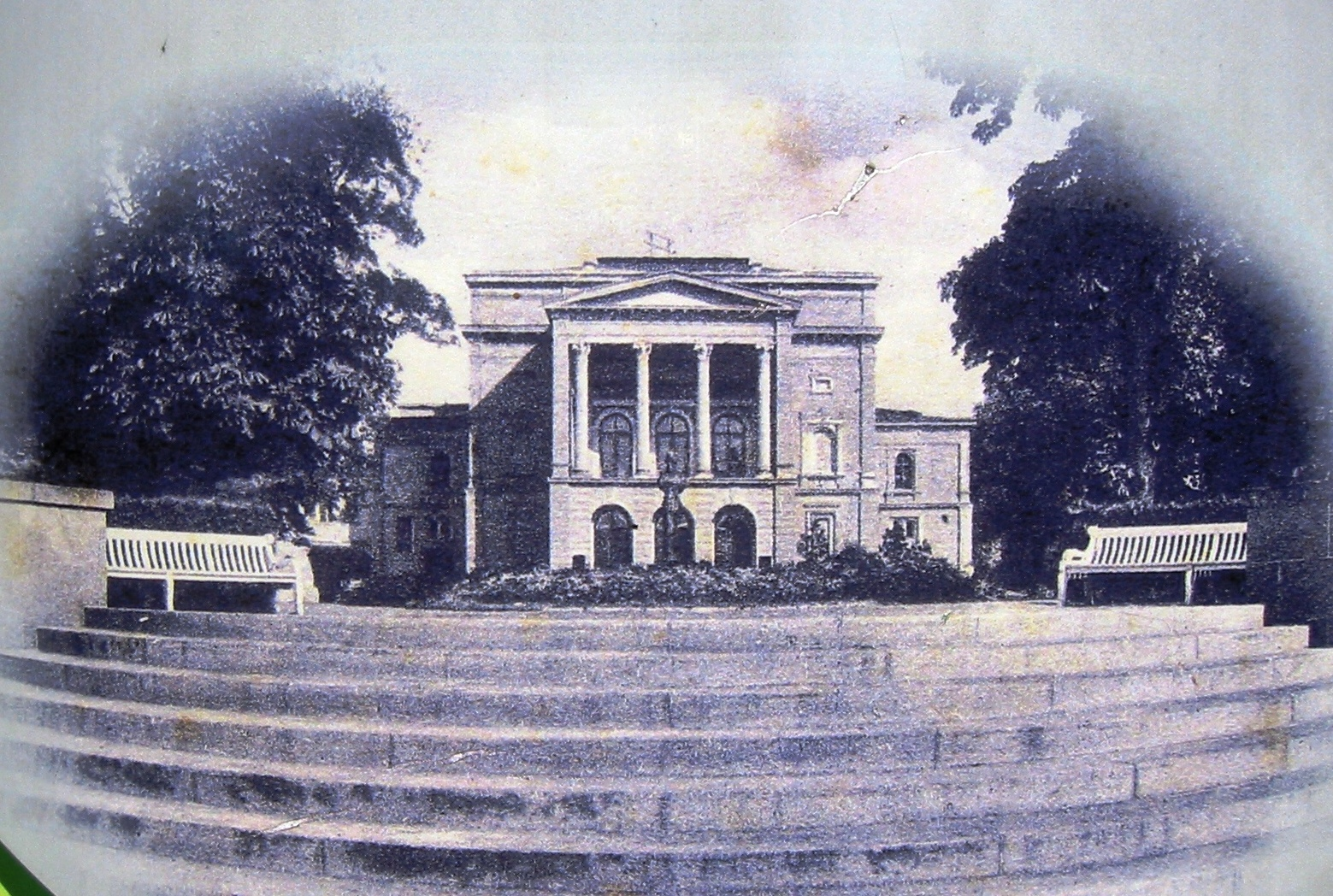
Former theatre

During World War II, in 1944–1945, the Germans operated a subcamp of the Gross-Rosen concentration camp, in which around 1,000 women, most of whom were Jewish, were imprisoned and used as forced labour. In February 1945 the Germans evacuated the prisoners, who were taken to the Bergen-Belsen concentration camp. The old town of Gubin was seriously damaged in the wake of the Soviet Vistula–Oder Offensive during the last stage of the war, with the historic town hall and church being burnt out. When after the war the Oder–Neisse line was chosen as the new East German–Polish border at the Potsdam Conference, Guben was split. The eastern portion of the devastated town, including the historic centre, became again Polish under the restored name Gubin, while the western portion as Guben became part of East Germany. The pre-war German population was expropriated and expelled to Guben on June 20, 1945. Gubin was repopulated with Polish settlers, partly from former eastern Poland, which was annexed by the Soviet Union.

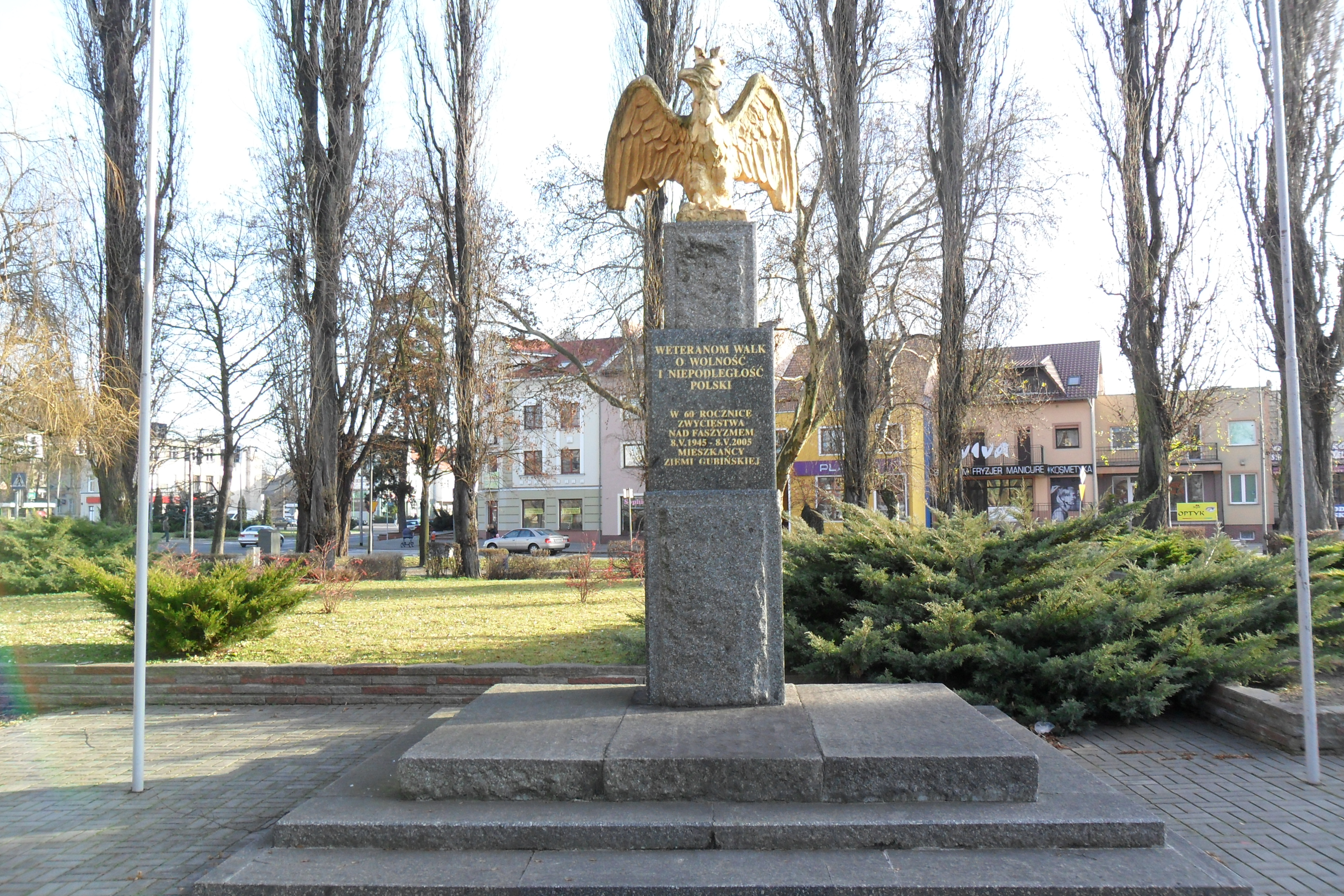
Monument to the veterans of the fights for Poland's freedom and independence

While the town hall dating from the 14th century has since been restored, the Late Gothic parish church is today a stabilised ruin. Recently, a historical society has set up plans for a reconstruction.

Gubin belonged to Zielona Góra Voivodeship from 1975 to 1998. A large garrison of the Polish Army was based in Gubin in 1951–2002, including the 5th Infantry Division, which evolved into the 5th "Saxony" Tank Division in 1956. The garrison was closed in 2002 following restructuring.

Since the Schengen Agreement entered into force on 21 December 2007, border controls between Gubin and Guben have been abolished.

== Coat of arms ==
The coat of arms of both the city of Gubin and Guben are almost identical, which further emphasizes their shared history as one township. Whereas the original arms of Guben features the Saxon coat of arms, the Bohemian Lion and the Prussian Eagle, Gubin dropped the Saxon and Prussian shields after it became part of Poland, and replaced the Bohemian double-tailed Lion in the centre with the Polish Eagle.

== Education ==
In Gubin, all of the schools to date are run by the local government.

== Sights ==
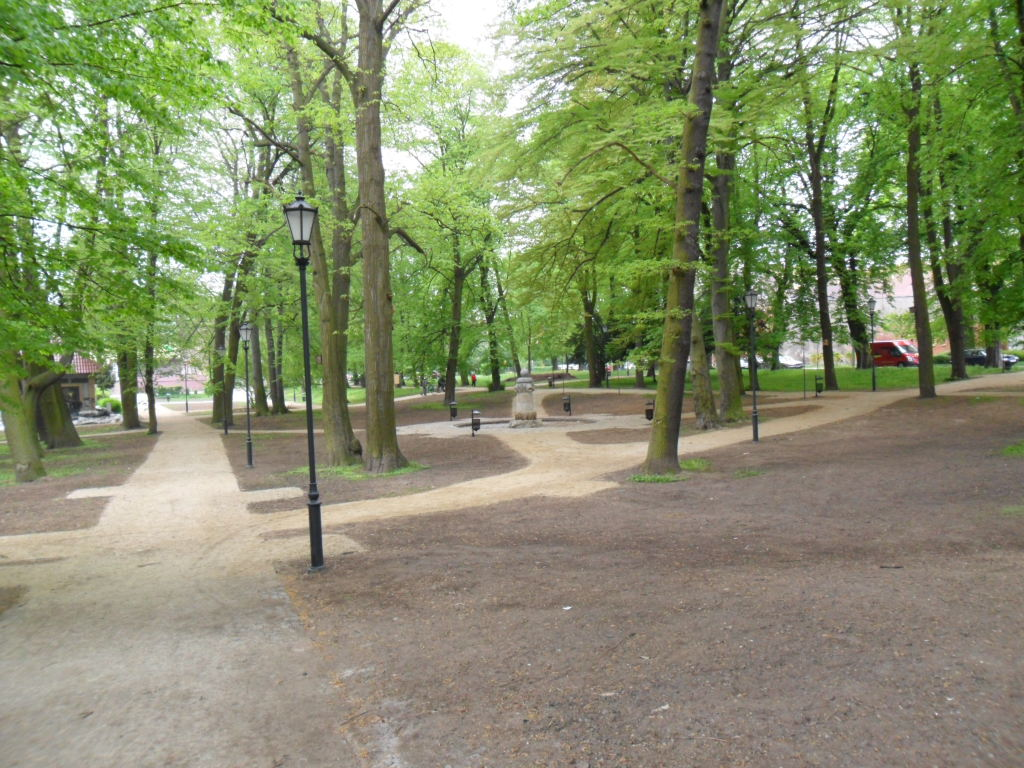
Adam Mickiewicz Park

- Town Hall
- Medieval town walls with gates and towers
- Gothic church
- Old Town
- Adam Mickiewicz Park
- Aleksander Waszkiewicz Park
- Villa Wolf

== Cuisine ==
Gubin and its surroundings are the place of cultivation of the gubinka plum, which is named after the town, and is officially recognized by the Ministry of Agriculture and Rural Development of Poland as a traditional product of the area.

== Sports ==
The local football club is Carina Gubin. It competes in the lower leagues.

== Notable people ==
- Czesław Fiedorowicz (born 1958), politician
- Barbara Jaracz (born 1977), chess player
- Michał Janota (born 1990), footballer

== Twin towns – sister cities ==
Gubin is twinned with:

- Guben, Germany
- Kwidzyn, Poland
- Laatzen, Germany
- Paks, Hungary
