= Lusatian Neisse =

River in Central Europe

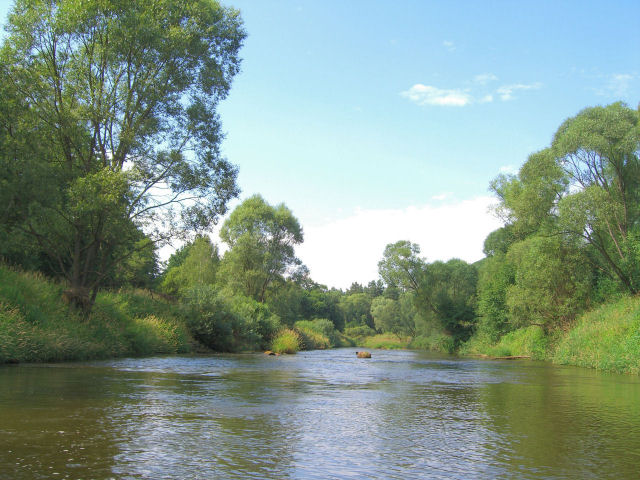
- The Neisse near Skerbersdorf, Krauschwitz municipality

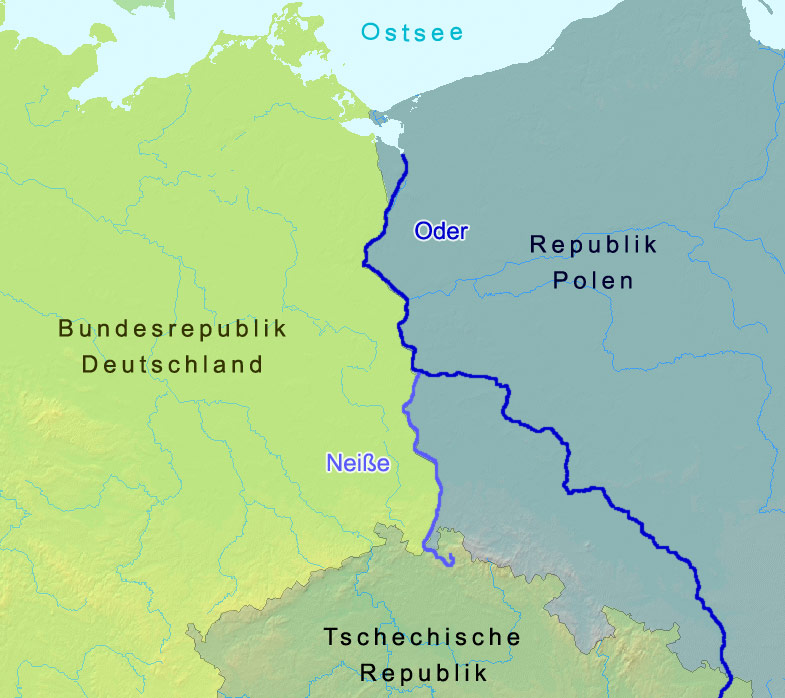
- Oder and Neisse rivers
- Native name: Nysa Łużycka (Polish); Lausitzer Neiße (German); Lužická Nisa (Czech); Łužiska Nysa (Upper Sorbian); Łužyska Nysa (Lower Sorbian)

Location
- Countries: Czech Republic; Poland; Germany
- Cities: Liberec, Jablonec nad Nisou, Zittau, Görlitz/Zgorzelec, Gubin/Guben

Physical characteristics
- Source: Jizera Mountains
  - location: Nová Ves nad Nisou, Liberec Region, Czech Republic
  - coordinates: 50°43′47″N 15°13′44″E
  - elevation: 655 m (2,149 ft)
- Mouth: Oder
  - location: Neißemünde, Brandenburg, Germany
  - coordinates: 52°4′11″N 14°45′20″E
  - elevation: 32 m (105 ft)
- Length: 252 km (157 mi)
- Basin size: 4,403 km^{2} (1,700 sq mi)
- Discharge
  - average: 31 m^{3}/s (1,100 cu ft/s)

Basin features
- Progression: Oder→ Baltic Sea

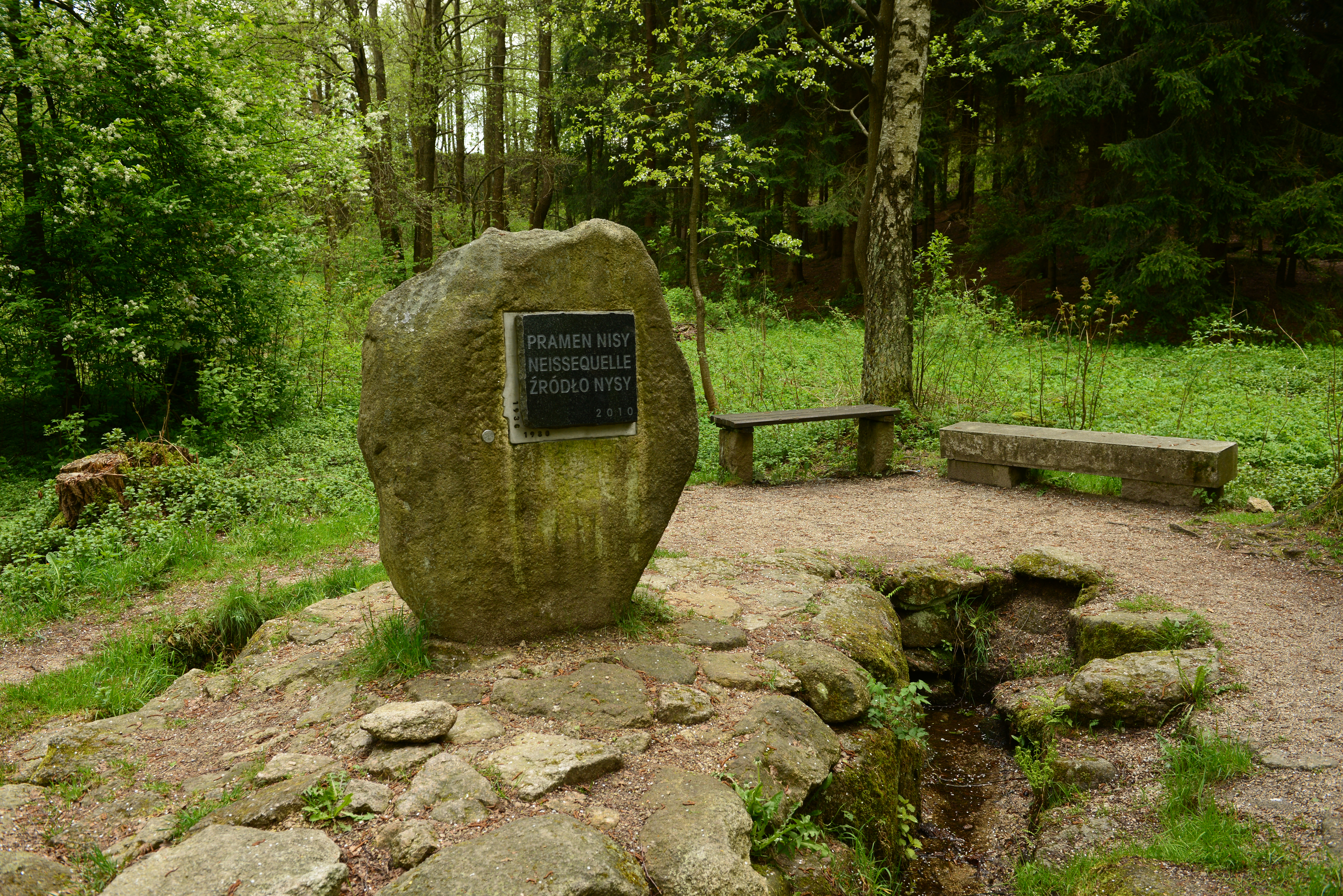

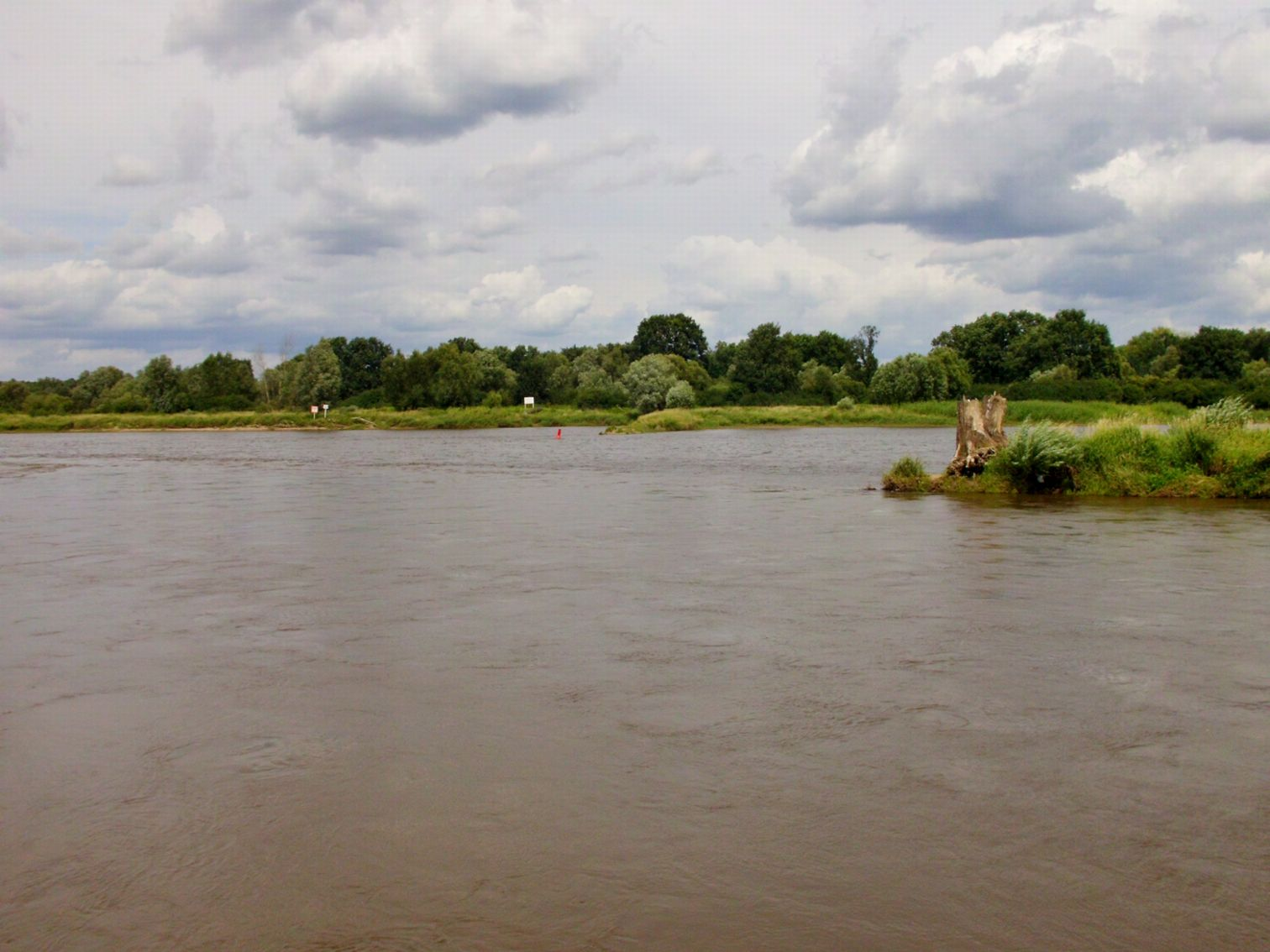
The Neisse river near the village of Ratzdorf (D) at the confluence in the Oder river. View to Poland

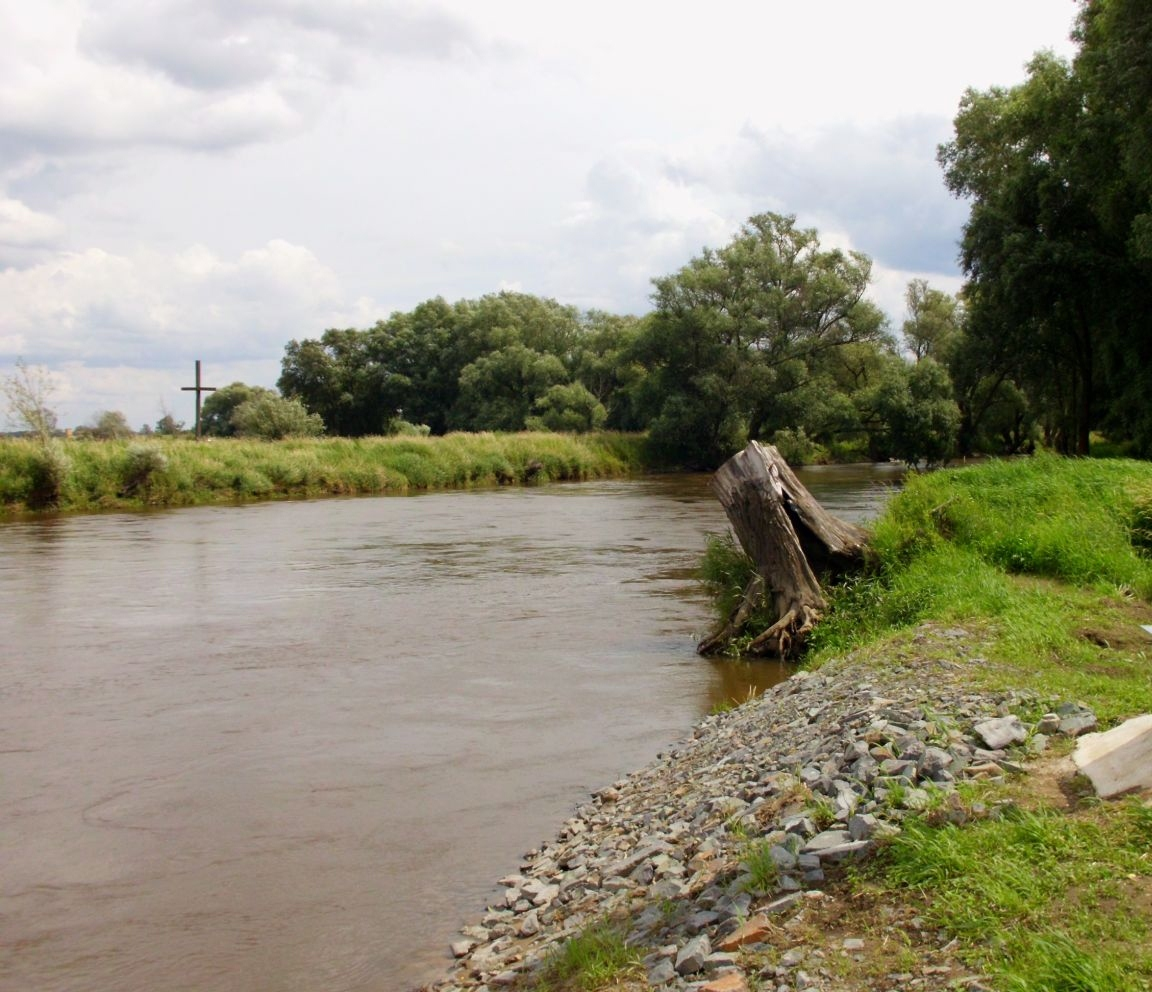
The Neisse river near the village of Ratzdorf (D) at the confluence in the Oder river. View to Poland

The Lusatian Neisse (German: Lausitzer Neiße; Polish: Nysa Łużycka; Czech: Lužická Nisa; Upper Sorbian: Łužiska Nysa; Lower Sorbian: Łužyska Nysa), or Western Neisse, is a 252-kilometre (157 mi) river in northern Central Europe. It rises in the Jizera Mountains, near Nová Ves nad Nisou, at the Czech border becoming the Polish–German border for its remaining 197 kilometres (122 mi), to flow into the similarly northward-flowing Oder from the left.

Its drainage basin covers 4,403 km^{2} (1,700 sq mi), of which 2,201 km^{2} (850 sq mi) is in Poland, the rest is mainly in Germany. The river reaches the tripoint of the three nations by Zittau, a German town/city, after 54 kilometres (34 mi), leaving the Czech Republic. It is a left-bank tributary of the Oder, into which it flows between Neißemünde-Ratzdorf and Kosarzyn – north of the towns of Guben and Gubin. The river was a motivation to found Gubin as a craftmanship and trading port in the 13th Century.

Since the 1945 Potsdam Agreement in the aftermath of World War II, the river has partially demarcated the German-Polish border (along the Oder–Neisse line). The German population east of the river was expelled from Poland to Germany.

It is the longest and most watered of the three rivers of its non-adjectival name in both the main languages (the two other rivers being the Eastern Neisse (Polish: Nysa Kłodzka; German: Glatzer Neiße) and Raging Neisse (Polish: Nysa Szalona; German: Wütende Neiße or Jauersche Neiße)). It is usually simply referred to as the Neisse.

== Name ==
Since the river runs through the historic region of Lusatia, the adjective "Lusatian" or "Western" before the name of the river Neisse is used whenever differentiating this border river from the Eastern Neisse (Polish: Nysa Kłodzka, German: Glatzer Neiße) and the smaller Raging Neisse (Polish: Nysa Szalona; German: Wütende Neiße or Jauersche Neiße), both in Poland.

== Towns and villages ==
At Bad Muskau the Neisse flows through Muskau Park, a UNESCO World Heritage Site. Cities and towns on the river from source to mouth include:

- Jablonec nad Nisou, Czech Republic
- Vratislavice, Czech Republic
- Liberec, Czech Republic
- Chrastava, Czech Republic
- Hrádek nad Nisou, Czech Republic
- Zittau, Germany
- Bogatynia, Poland
- Görlitz, Germany; Zgorzelec, Poland
- Pieńsk, Poland
- Bad Muskau, Germany; Łęknica, Poland
- Forst (Lausitz), Germany
- Guben, Germany; Gubin, Poland

== Bridges ==
Around 30 bridges for cars and railways exist over the Lusatian Neisse as of 2025, plus around 10 for pedestrians.

There were around 80 bridges in 1940. Almost all were destroyed by Germany in 1945 in order to prevent a Soviet attack on Germany. Some were repaired between 1945 and 1990, more after 1990.

== Tributaries ==
Right bank:

- Lubsza

Left bank:

- Mandau

== See also ==
- List of rivers of the Czech Republic
- List of rivers of Germany
- List of rivers of Poland
