= Paweł Jaracz =

Polish chess grandmaster (born 1975)

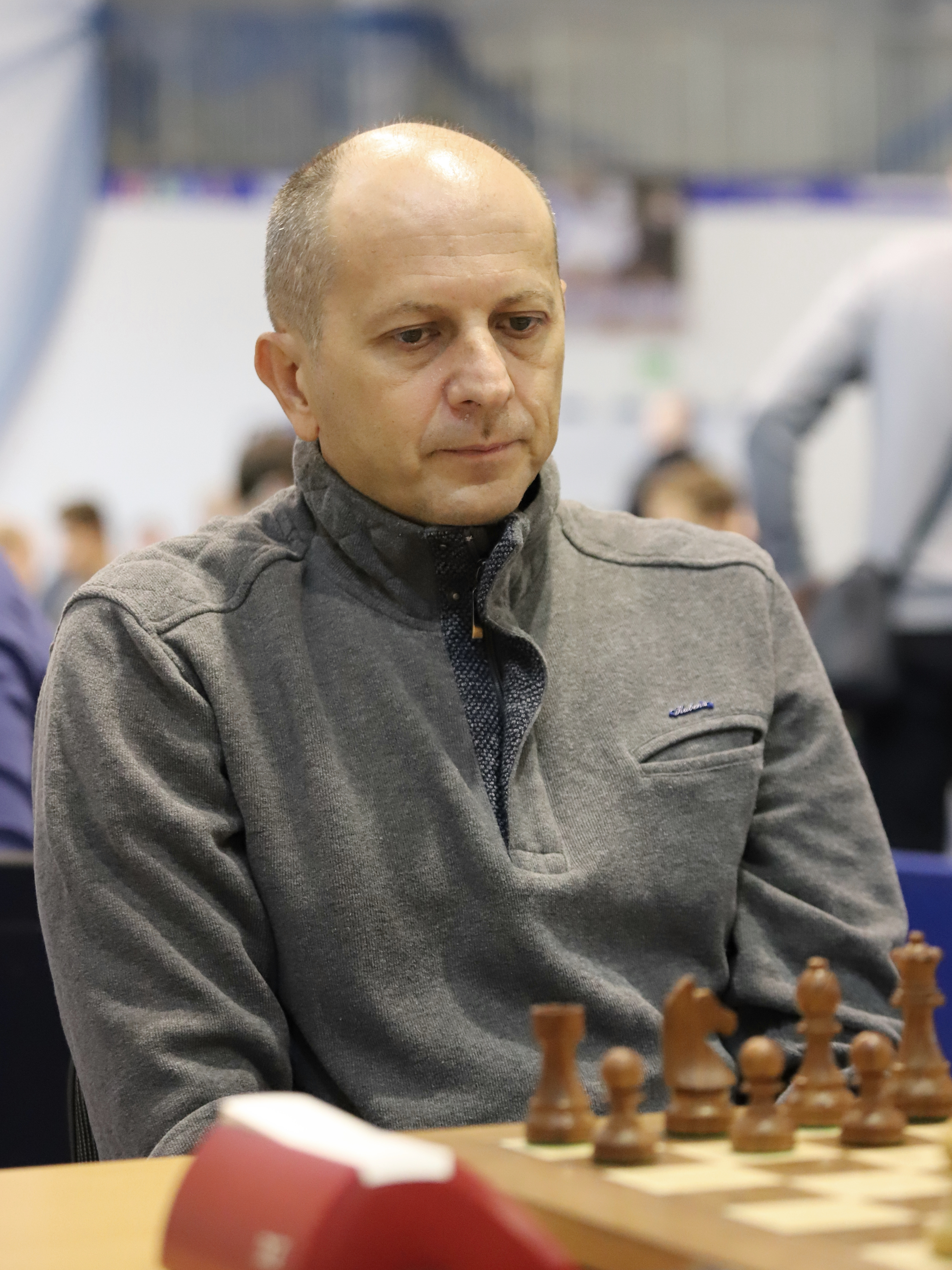
- Jaracz in 2021

Personal information
- Born: 22 July 1975 (age 50) Kożuchów, Poland
- Spouse: Barbara Grabarska

Chess career
- Country: Poland
- Title: Grandmaster (2000)
- FIDE rating: 2437 (July 2026)
- Peak rating: 2575 (May 2011)

Paweł Jaracz (born 22 July 1975) is a Polish chess Grandmaster (2000).

== Chess career ==
Jaracz is Polish Junior Chess Championship's multiple medalist, including four times gold: in 1989 to 14 years in Piechowice, and up to 15 years in Żychlin, in 1990 the age of 20 in Nisko, and in 1993 the age of 18 in Biała Podlaska. Many times represented Poland at the European Youth Chess Championship and World Junior Chess Championship in different age categories. The best results in 1988 (fourth place in Timișoara in a group of up to 14 years) and 1989 (sixth place in Puerto Rico in the same age group). In the Polish Chess Championship final's won two medals: silver (2011) and bronze (1994). Jaracz is three times winner of Polish Blitz Chess Championship (1996, 2003, 2014). Also he won Polish championship in rapid chess in 1994. In 2003 he shared the first place in International Chess tournament in Benasque. In 2010 Jaracz won EU Individual Open Chess Championship in Arvier.

== Personal life ==
His wife Barbara Jaracz is chess Woman Grandmaster (2007) and one of the leading Polish women chess players.
