= Barbara Jaracz =

Polish chess player (born 1977)

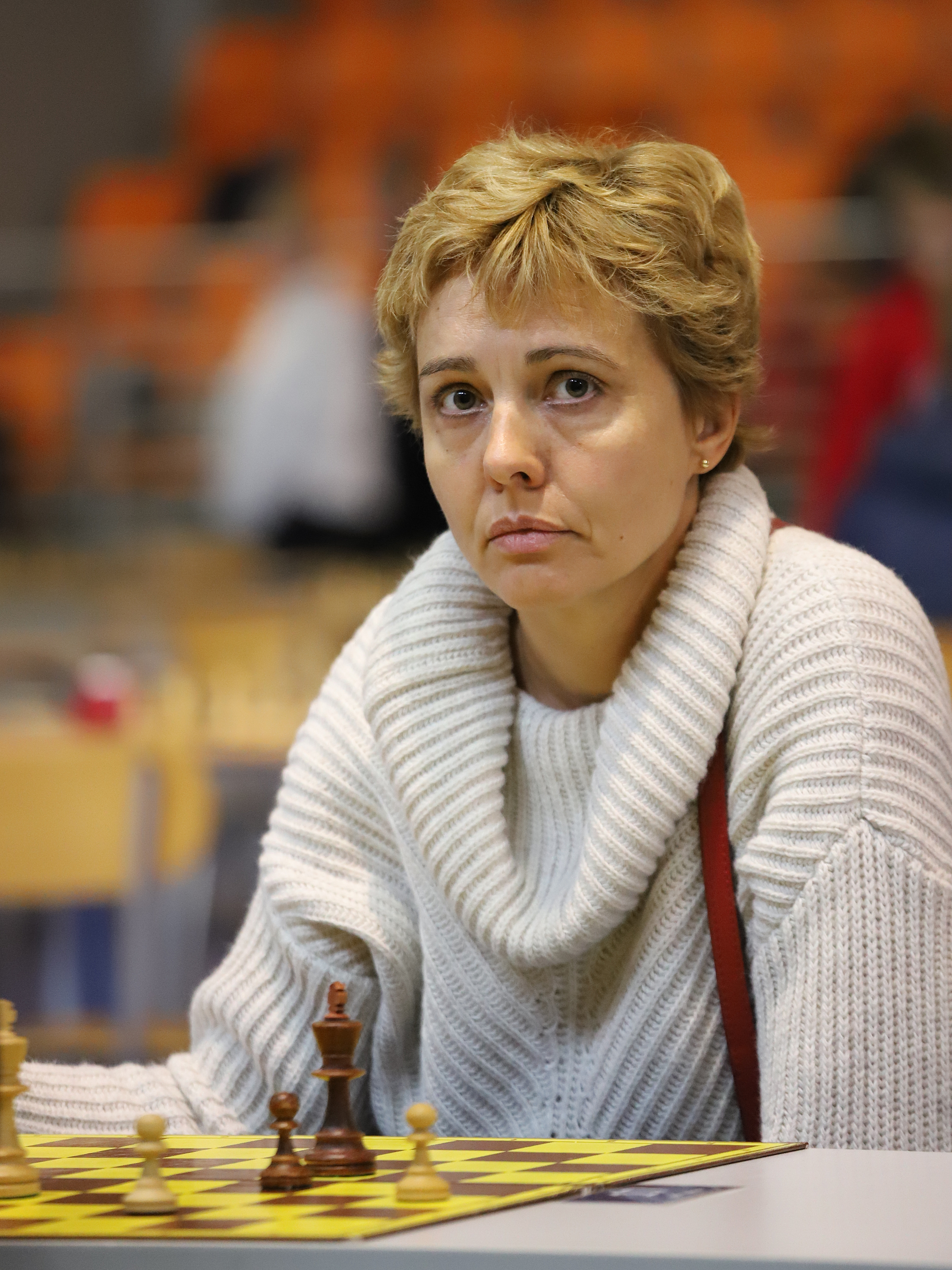
- Jaracz in 2021

Personal information
- Born: Barbara Grabarska; 8 June 1977 (age 49) Gubin, Poland
- Spouse: Paweł Jaracz

Chess career
- Country: Poland
- Title: Woman Grandmaster (2007)
- Peak rating: 2342 (April 2003)

Barbara Jaracz (née Grabarska; born 8 June 1977) is a Polish chess Woman Grandmaster (2007).

== Chess career ==
From the middle of 1990s, Jaracz is one of the leading Polish women chess player. In 1995, she first time appeared in the Polish Women's Chess Championship's final. Later, Jaracz won two medals in this tournament: silver (1997) and bronze (2001). In 1995, Jaracz represented Poland in European Youth Chess Championship under the age of 18. In 1997, she participated in World Junior Chess Championship under the age of 20 in Żagań.

Jaracz played for Poland in European Team Chess Championship:

- In 1997, won individual bronze medal at second board in the 2nd European Team Chess Championship (women) in Pula (+4, =3, -0).
- In 1999, at first reserve board in the 3rd European Team Chess Championship (women) in Batumi (+1, =2, -2).

== Personal life ==
Her husband Paweł Jaracz is also a Chess Grandmaster and one of Poland's leading chess players.
