= Lubsza (river) =

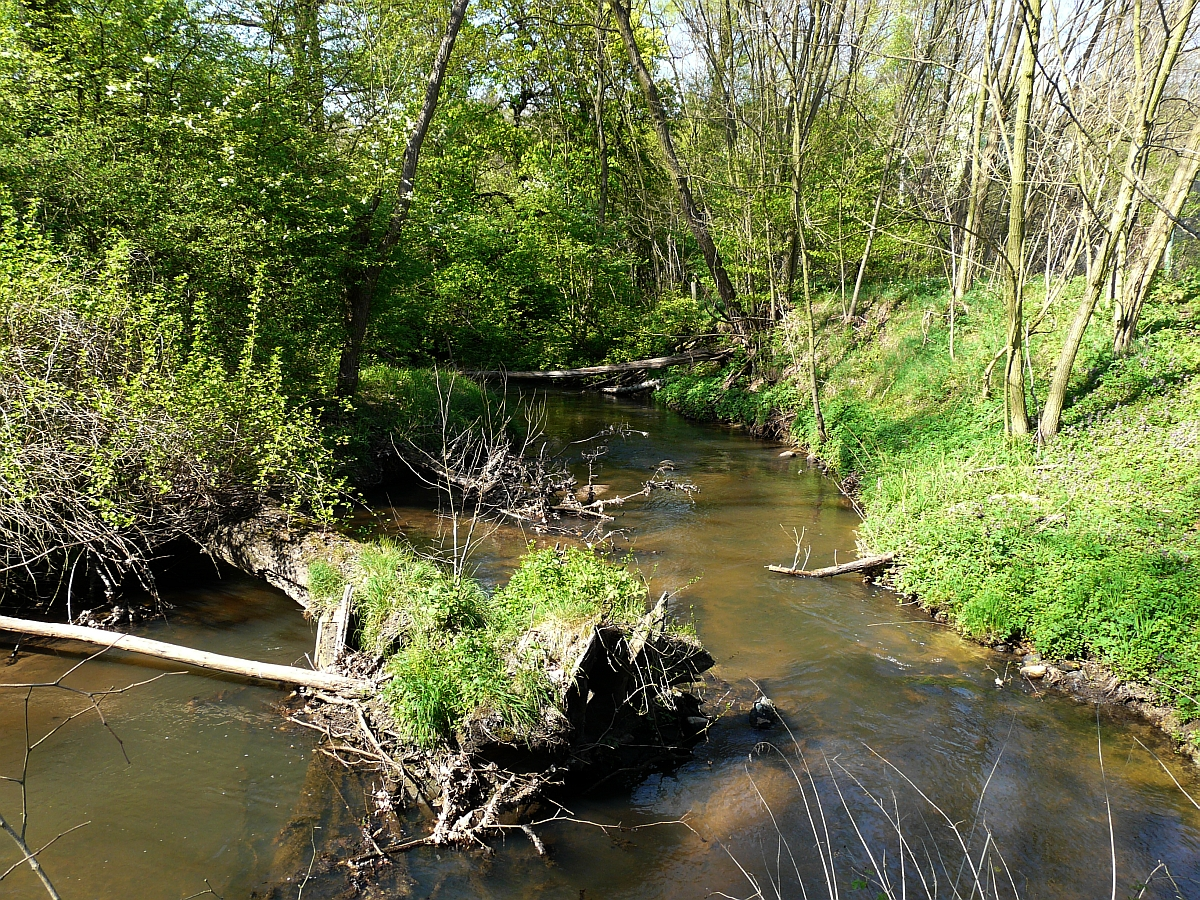

Location
- Country: Poland

Physical characteristics
- Mouth
  - location: Lusatian Neisse
  - coordinates: 51°57′14″N 14°43′21″E

Basin features
- Progression: Lusatian Neisse→ Oder→ Baltic Sea

Lubsza is a river in Lubusz Voivodeship, Poland. It is a tributary of Lusatian Neisse (Nysa Łużycka) near Gubin.

In the 13th century, the medieval town of Gubin was founded to serve as an important settlement for craftsmanship and trade due to its position near this river and the Nysa Łużycka River.
