= Chess World Cup 2023 =

Chess tournament in Baku, Azerbaijan

FIDE Chess World Cup 2023
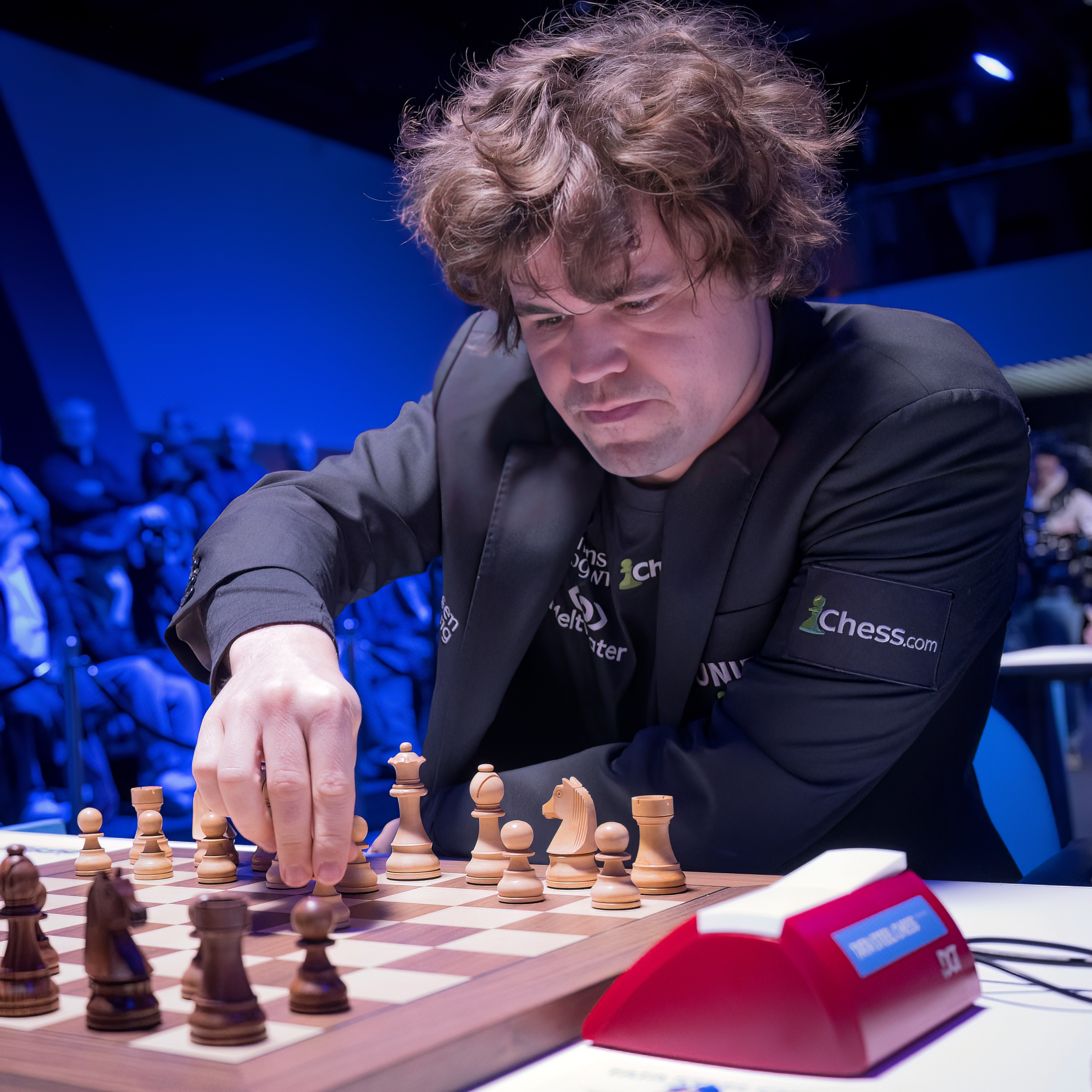
- Magnus Carlsen, the winner of the 2023 FIDE World Cup.

Tournament information
- Sport: Chess
- Location: Baku, Azerbaijan
- Dates: 30 July 2023–24 August 2023
- Administrator: FIDE
- Tournament format: Single-elimination tournament
- Host: Azerbaijan Chess Federation
- Participants: 206

Final positions
- Champion: (Norway) Magnus Carlsen
- Runner-up: (India) R Praggnanandhaa
- 3rd place: (United States) Fabiano Caruana

The Chess World Cup 2023 was a 206-player single-elimination chess tournament that took place in Baku, Azerbaijan, from 30 July to 24 August 2023. It was the 10th edition of the Chess World Cup. The winner, runner-up and third-place finisher of the tournament (Magnus Carlsen, R Praggnanandhaa and Fabiano Caruana) earned the right to the play in the 2024 Candidates Tournament. In January 2024, Carlsen withdrew from the Candidates tournament, with the fourth-place finisher from the World Cup (Nijat Abasov) qualifying in his place. The tournament was held in parallel with the Women's Chess World Cup 2023.

Jan-Krzysztof Duda was the defending champion. He lost in the fifth round (last 16) to Fabiano Caruana.

== Format ==
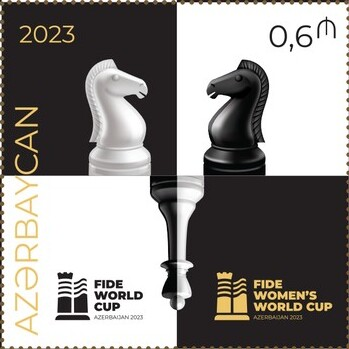
Stamps of Azerbaijan

The tournament was an eight-round knockout event, with the top 50 seeds having been given a bye directly into the second round. The losers of the two semi-finals played a match for third place. The players who finished first, second, and third qualified for the Candidates Tournament 2024, a tournament to decide the challenger for the upcoming World Championship.

Each round consisted of classical time limit games on the first two days, plus tie-breaks on the third day if they were required. The time limits were as follows:

Two classical time limit games: 90 minutes, plus a 30-minute increment on move 40, plus a 30-second increment per move from move 41, per player. If the match was tied after the classical games, players played two rapid chess games, with 25 minutes plus a 10-second increment per move, per player. If the match was tied, players played two more rapid chess games, with 10 minutes plus a 10-second increment per move, per player. If the match was still tied, players played two blitz games, with five minutes plus a three-second increment per move, per player. If the match was still tied, a single blitz game, with three minutes plus a two-second increment per move, was played to decide the match. A drawing of lots determined which player had white. If the game was drawn, the players switched colors and played again, and this process was repeated until a decisive result was obtained.

=== Schedule ===
Each round lasted three days: two for classical time control games and a third, if necessary, for tie-breaks. Rounds 1 to 3 ran from 30 July to 7 August; 8 August was a rest day; Rounds 4 to 6 ran from 9 to 17 August; 18 August was a rest day; and the last two rounds ran from 19 to 24 August.

=== Prize money ===
The total prize fund was US$1,834,000, with a first prize of US$110,000.

Prize money in US dollars
Ranking	Prizes	Total
Eliminated in Round 1	78 × 3,000	234,000
Eliminated in Round 2	64 × 6,000	384,000
Eliminated in Round 3	32 × 10,000	320,000
Eliminated in Round 4	16 × 16,000	256,000
Eliminated in Round 5	8 × 25,000	200,000
Eliminated in Round 6	4 × 35,000	140,000
4th place	1 × 50,000	50,000
3rd place	1 × 60,000	60,000
Runner-up	1 × 80,000	80,000
Winner	1 × 110,000	110,000
Total		1,834,000

== Participants ==
The participants are seeded here by their FIDE rating of July 2023. (Note: Ding Liren would have been seeded first as the World Champion, but he declined to play in the World Cup.) All players are grandmasters unless indicated otherwise.

1. Magnus Carlsen (NOR), 2835 (WC)
2. Hikaru Nakamura (USA), 2787 (PN)
3. Fabiano Caruana (USA), 2782 (Z2.1)
4. Ian Nepomniachtchi (RUS), 2779 (R)
5. Anish Giri (NED), 2775 (R)
6. Wesley So (USA), 2769 (Z2.1)
7. Teimour Radjabov (AZE), 2747 (R)
8. Gukesh Dommaraju (IND), 2744 (R)
9. Shakhriyar Mamedyarov (AZE), 2742 (R)
10. Maxime Vachier-Lagrave (FRA), 2739 (R)
11. Leinier Domínguez (USA), 2739 (Z2.1)
12. Alexander Grischuk (RUS), 2736 (R)
13. Yu Yangyi (CHN), 2735 (R)
14. Jan-Krzysztof Duda (POL), 2732 (WC)
15. Lê Quang Liêm (VIE), 2728 (R)
16. Wei Yi (CHN), 2726 (R)
17. Nodirbek Abdusattorov (UZB), 2725 (R)
18. Nikita Vitiugov (FIDE), 2720 (R)
19. Parham Maghsoodloo (IRI), 2719 (R)
20. Vidit Gujrathi (IND), 2719 (R)
21. Daniil Dubov (RUS), 2716 (R)
22. Sam Shankland (USA), 2711 (FN)
23. Arjun Erigaisi (IND), 2710 (PN)
24. Wang Hao (CHN), 2709 (R)
25. Francisco Vallejo Pons (ESP), 2706 (FN)
26. Bassem Amin (EGY), 2694 (AF22)
27. Kirill Shevchenko (ROM), 2694 (E23)
28. Jorden van Foreest (NED), 2693 (FN)
29. Bogdan-Daniel Deac (ROM), 2693 (E21)
30. David Antón Guijarro (ESP), 2691 (E22)
31. R Praggnanandhaa (IND), 2690 (AS22)
32. Vincent Keymer (GER), 2690 (E21)
33. Amin Tabatabaei (IRI), 2689 (FN)
34. David Navara (CZE), 2689 (E21)
35. Ray Robson (USA), 2689 (Z2.1)
36. Nihal Sarin (IND), 2688 (FN)
37. Peter Svidler (FIDE), 2688 (PN)
38. Alexey Sarana (SRB), 2685 (E21)
39. Nils Grandelius (SWE), 2684 (E23)
40. Andrey Esipenko (FIDE), 2683 (E23)
41. David Howell (ENG), 2677 (FN)
42. Vladimir Fedoseev (SLO), 2676 (WC)
43. Radosław Wojtaszek (POL), 2676 (FN)
44. Andrei Volokitin (UKR), 2674 (FN)
45. Matthias Bluebaum (GER), 2672 (E21)
46. Alexander Donchenko (GER), 2668 (E23)
47. Boris Gelfand (ISR), 2668 (E23)
48. Anton Korobov (UKR), 2667 (E23)
49. Vasyl Ivanchuk (UKR), 2667 (PN)
50. Ruslan Ponomariov (UKR), 2664 (E22)
51. Ivan Cheparinov (BUL), 2663 (E22)
52. Etienne Bacrot (FRA), 2662 (E23)
53. Salem Saleh (UAE), 2661 (FN)
54. Gadir Guseinov (AZE), 2661 (E22)
55. Javokhir Sindarov (UZB), 2659 (FN)
56. Ivan Šarić (CRO), 2657 (E22)
57. S. L. Narayanan (IND), 2656 (AS22)
58. Jaime Santos Latasa (ESP), 2656 (E22)
59. Jules Moussard (FRA), 2654 (E22)
60. Laurent Fressinet (FRA), 2652 (FN)
61. Alexandr Predke (SRB), 2651 (E23)
62. Awonder Liang (USA), 2649 (Z2.1)
63. Benjámin Gledura (HUN), 2645 (E23)
64. Thai Dai Van Nguyen (CZE), 2642 (E23)
65. Aryan Tari (NOR), 2641 (E22)
66. Nodirbek Yakubboev (UZB), 2640 (Z3.4)
67. Mustafa Yılmaz (TUR), 2639 (E21)
68. Rauf Mamedov (AZE), 2636 (E21)
69. Nijat Abasov (AZE), 2632 (E23)
70. Vasif Durarbayli (AZE), 2631 (E22)
71. Georg Meier (URU), 2629 (AM23)
72. Yuriy Kuzubov (UKR), 2628 (E22)
73. Rasmus Svane (GER), 2625 (E21)
74. Markus Ragger (AUT), 2624 (E22)
75. Jonas Buhl Bjerre (DEN), 2624 (E21)
76. Anton Demchenko (SLO), 2623 (E21)
77. Aleksandar Inđić (SRB), 2619 (E22)
78. Frederik Svane (GER), 2618 (E23)
79. Dmitrij Kollars (GER), 2618, (FN)
80. Cristobal Henriquez Villagra (CHI), 2618 (Z2.5)
81. Eduardo Iturrizaga Bonelli (ESP), 2617 (E22)
82. Ferenc Berkes (HUN), 2615 (FN)
83. Mateusz Bartel (POL), 2614 (E22)
84. David Paravyan (FIDE), 2612 (E23)
85. Daniele Vocaturo (ITA), 2609 (E21)
86. Eric Hansen (CAN), 2609 (FN)
87. Jerguš Pecháč (SVK), 2608 (E23)
88. Ante Brkic (CRO), 2608 (E23)
89. Eltaj Safarli (AZE), 2607 (FN)
90. Mikhail Antipov (FIDE), 2606 (E21)
91. Christopher Yoo (USA), 2606 (AM22)
92. Abhimanyu Puranik (IND), 2605 (AS23)
93. Axel Bachmann (PAR), 2604 (FN)
94. Alexandr Fier (BRA), 2604 (Z2.4)
95. Niclas Huschenbeth (GER), 2603 (E21)
96. Denis Kadric (MNE), 2601 (FN)
97. Daniel Dardha (BEL), 2600 (E23)
98. Maxime Lagarde (FRA), 2599 (E21)
99. Shamsiddin Vokhidov (UZB), 2597 (AS23)
100. Kacper Piorun (POL), 2597 (E21)
101. Ahmed Adly (EGY), 2596 (AF22)
102. Ilia Smirin (ISR), 2595 (FN)
103. Carlos Daniel Albornoz Cabrera (CUB), 2591 (Z2.3)
104. Velimir Ivic (SRB), 2590 (E21)
105. Rinat Jumabayev (KAZ), 2589 (FN)
106. Sergei Azarov (FIDE), 2589 (E23)
107. Nidjat Mamedov (AZE), 2589 (E21)
108. Adhiban Baskaran (IND), 2587 (AS22)
109. Dimitrios Mastrovasilis (GRE), 2587 (FN)
110. Aydin Suleymanli (AZE), 2586 (ON)
111. Daniel Fridman (GER), 2586 (E21)
112. Vahap Şanal (TUR), 2585 (E21)
113. Luis Paulo Supi (BRA), 2582 (FN)
114. Peter Michalik (CZE), 2582 (FN)
115. Timur Gareyev (USA), 2581 (AM22)
116. Temur Kuybokarov (AUS), 2581 (Z3.6)
117. Bardiya Daneshvar (IRI), 2577 (AS23)
118. Szymon Gumularz (POL), 2577 (E23)
119. Valentin Dragnev (AUT), 2576 (E23)
120. Tin Jingyao (SGP), 2573 (AS23)
121. Bobby Cheng (AUS), 2572 (FN)
122. Viktor Erdős (HUN), 2571 (E21)
123. Emre Can (TUR), 2570 (FN)
124. Fernando Peralta (ARG), 2568 (FN)
125. Vugar Asadli (AZE), 2567 (ON)
126. Tomas Laurusas (LTU), 2566 (FN)
127. Karthik Venkataraman (IND), 2565 (Z3.7)
128. Levan Pantsulaia (GEO), 2564 (E21)
129. Harsha Bharathakoti (IND), 2563 (AS22)
130. Gregory Kaidanov (USA), 2563 (AM22)
131. Mikheil Mchedlishvili (GEO), 2561 (FN)
132. Lê Tuấn Minh (VIE), 2557 (Z3.3)
133. Arseniy Nesterov (FIDE), 2554 (E22)
134. Luis Ernesto Quesada Pérez (CUB), 2553 (FN)
135. Grzegorz Nasuta (POL), 2552 (E23)
136. Misratdin Iskandarov (AZE), 2551 (E22)
137. Vladimir Baklan (UKR), 2550 (E22)
138. Ori Kobo (ISR), 2548 (E22)
139. Igor Janik (POL), 2548 (E23)
140. Mahammad Muradli (AZE), 2546 (ON)
141. Vitaliy Bernadskiy (UKR), 2545 (E22)
142. Emilio Cordova (PER), 2542 (FN)
143. Ivan Ivanisevic (SRB), 2536 (FN)
144. Adham Fawzy (EGY), 2533 (AF23)
145. Zdenko Kozul (CRO), 2532 (E22)
146. Stamatis Kourkoulos-Arditis (GRE), IM, 2531 (E23)
147. Xu Yinglun (CHN), 2531 (Z3.5)
148. Felix Blohberger (AUT), 2522 (FN)
149. Lance Henderson de La Fuente (AND), 2517 (Z1.10)
150. Ivan Schitco (MLD), 2507 (FN)
151. Susanto Megaranto (INA), 2505 (FN)
152. Luka Paichadze (GEO), 2501 (E21)
153. Ediz Gürel (TUR), IM, 2500 (E23)
154. Alisher Suleymenov (KAZ), IM, 2499 (Z3.4)
155. Santiago Avila Pavas (COL), 2499 (FN)
156. Evandro Barbosa (BRA), 2493 (Z2.4)
157. Pablo Ismael Acosta (ARG), IM, 2485 (Z2.5)
158. Abdulla Gadimbayli (AZE), 2483 (U20)
159. Yago De Moura Santiago (BRA), 2481 (AM23)
160. Goh Wei Ming (SGP), 2473 (FN)
161. Pablo Salinas Herrera (CHI), 2468 (FN)
162. Fy Rakotomaharo (MAD), IM, 2463 (FN)
163. Gábor Nagy (HUN), 2461 (E21)
164. Sumiya Bilguun (MGL), 2457 (Z3.3)
165. Luis Fernando Ibarra Chami (MEX), 2448 (FN)
166. Huang Renjie (CHN), untitled, 2445 (Z3.5)
167. Josiah Stearman (USA), IM, 2444 (AM23)
168. Roberto Carlos Sanchez Alvarez (PAN), IM, 2444 (Z2.3)
169. Carlos Matamoros Franco (ECU), 2441 (FN)
170. Mark Paragua (PHI), 2438 (FN)
171. Susal Thewjan de Silva (SRI), IM, 2433 (FN)
172. Mohammad Fahad Rahman (BAN), IM, 2428 (Z3.2)
173. Trần Thanh Tú (JPN), CM, 2420 (FN)
174. Abdelrahman Hesham (EGY), 2414 (AF22)
175. Pouria Darini (IRI), 2412 (Z3.1)
176. Ganzorig Amartuvshin (MGL), IM, 2407 (FN)
177. Daniel Cawdery (RSA), IM, 2388 (FN)
178. Enamul Hossain (BAN), 2386 (FN)
179. Lee Jun Hyeok (KOR), IM, 2378 (FN)
180. Amir Zaibi (TUN), 2375 (FN)
181. Gianmarco Leiva (PER), IM, 2374 (AM23)
182. Basheer Al Qudaimi (YEM), IM, 2374 (FN)
183. Kareim Wageih (EGY), IM, 2369 (FN)
184. Prin Laohawirapap (THA), FM, 2353 (FN)
185. Mohamed Tissir (MAR), IM, 2347 (FN)
186. Bernardo Roselli (URU), IM, 2347 (FN)
187. Leonel Figueredo Losada (MEX), IM, 2345 (AM22)
188. Rodwell Makoto (ZIM), IM, 2312 (FN)
189. Lim Zhuo Ren (MAS), FM, 2310 (FN)
190. Chitumbo Mwali (ZAM), IM, 2304 (FN)
191. Malek Koniahli (SYR), FM, 2296 (FN)
192. Amro El Jawich (LBN), FM, 2288 (FN)
193. Yuanchen Zhang (CAN), IM, 2281 (Z2.2)
194. Eldiar Orozbaev (KGZ), FM, 2281 (FN)
195. Alisher Karimov (TJK), FM, 2273 (FN)
196. Oluwafemi Balogun (NGR), IM, 2235 (FN)
197. Massinas Djabri (ALG), FM, 2231 (FN)
198. Haruna Nsubuga (UGA), FM, 2223 (FN)
199. Austin Yang Ching-Wei (TPE), FM, 2212 (FN)
200. Providence Oatlhotse (BOT), IM, 2199 (FN)
201. Dante Beukes (NAM), IM, 2180 (FN)
202. Deng Cypriano Rehan (SSD), untitled, 2147 (FN)
203. Rupesh Jaiswal (NEP), FM, 2122 (FN)
204. Aydagnuhem Gezachew Abera (ETH), CM, 2121 (FN)
205. Nay Lin Tun (MYA), CM, 2055 (FN)
206. Yousef Alhassadi (LBA), untitled, 2030 (FN)

Click on the seed number of a player to go to their draw section.

=== Qualifier explanation ===
The following 206 players qualified for the World Cup:

- The world chess champion (declined to play)
- The women's world chess champion as of 1 June 2023 (WWC) (declined to play)
- The 2022 World Junior Champion U20 (U20)
- The top four players in the Chess World Cup 2021 (WC)
- 109 players qualifying from Continental and Zonal events:
  - Europe (47+20): including European Championships 2021 (E21, 23), 2022 (E22, 20), and 2023, (E23, 23), and Zone 1.10 2022 (Z1.10, 1)
  - Americas (11+9): including American Continental Championships 2022 (AM22, 4) and 2023 (AM23, 4), Zonals 2.1 (Z2.1, 5), 2.2 (Z2.2, 1), 2.3 (Z2.3, 2), and 2.4 2022 (Z2.4, 2), and Zonal 2.5 2023 (Z2.5, 2)
  - Asia (18): including Asian Championships 2022 (AS22, 4) and 2023 (AS23, 4), Zonals 3.1 (Z3.1, 1), 3.2 (Z3.2, 1), 3.3 (Z3.3, 2), 3.4 (Z3.4, 2), 3.5 (Z3.5, 2), 3.6 (Z3.6, 1), and 3.7 2023 (Z3.7, 1)
  - Africa (4): including the African Championships 2022 (AF22, 3) and 2023 (AF23, 1)
- The 13 highest-rated players from the June 2023 FIDE World Rankings (Note: Players who appear inactive at least once in the 6 FIDE rating lists from January to June 2023 are not eligible.) (R)
- 71 federation spots selected according to the final standings of the 44th Chess Olympiad (FN)
- 4 nominees of the FIDE President (PN)
- 2 nominees of the organizer (ON)

Armenia did not nominate a player, and a third Organizer's nominee was invited instead.

The participants were seeded by their FIDE rating of July 2023.

=== Replacements ===
The following are the players from the list of qualifiers who declined to play, and their replacements:

- Ding Liren (CHN), 2780 (World Champion) → Nodirbek Abdusattorov (UZB), 2732 (R)
- Alireza Firouzja (FRA), 2786 (R) → Lê Quang Liêm (VIE), 2728 (R)
- Viswanathan Anand (IND), 2754 (R) → Wei Yi (CHN), 2722 (R)
- Hikaru Nakamura (USA), 2775 (R) → Wang Hao (CHN), 2709 (R) (Note: Nakamura initially qualified by rating, but declined his invitation due to unspecified summer plans. He later received a nomination by the FIDE president after his summer plans were cancelled.)
- Richárd Rapport (ROU), 2752 (R) → Nikita Vitiugov (FIDE), 2721 (R)
- Sergey Karjakin (RUS), 2750 (WC) → Parham Maghsoodloo (IRI), 2716 (R)
- Levon Aronian (USA), 2742 (R) → Daniil Dubov (RUS), 2716 (R)
- Ju Wenjun (CHN), 2566 (WWC) → Vidit Gujrathi (IND), 2719 (R) (Ju Wenjun played in the Women's World Cup instead.)
- Gabriel Sargissian (ARM), 2692 (E22) → Markus Ragger (AUT), 2624 (E22)
- Haik Martirosyan (ARM), 2685 (E22) → Mateusz Bartel (POL), 2614 (E22)
- Shant Sargsyan (ARM), 2640 (E22) → Eduardo Iturrizaga Bonelli (ESP), 2617 (E22)
- Yasser Quesada (CUB), 2609 (AM22) → Leonel Figueredo Losada (MEX), IM, 2345
- Samvel Ter-Sahakyan (ARM), 2598 (E22) → Vladimir Baklan (UKR), 2550 (E22)
- Hovhannes Gabuzyan (ARM), 2579 (E21) → Levan Pantsulaia (GEO), 2564
- Kirk Ghazarian (USA), IM, 2479 (AM23) → Gianmarco Leiva (PER) (AM23).

== Rounds 1–4 ==
Pairings were published on the official FIDE website on 4 July.

=== Section 1 ===
First round
1	(Norway) M Carlsen	Bye
-	Bye 1
128	(Georgia (country)) L Pantsulaia	2½
129	(India) H Bharathakoti	1½
65	(Norway) A Tari	2
192	(Lebanon) A El Jawich	0
64	(Czech Republic) TDV Nguyen	2
193	(Canada) Y Zhang	0
33	(Iran) A Tabatabaei	Bye
-	Bye 33
96	(Montenegro) D Kadrić	0
161	(Chile) P Salinas Herrera	2
97	(Belgium) D Dardha	1½
160	(Singapore) WM Goh	½
32	(Germany) V Keymer	Bye
-	Bye 32

Second round
1	(Norway) M Carlsen	2
128	(Georgia (country)) L Pantsulaia	0
65	(Norway) A Tari	1½
64	(Czech Republic) TDV Nguyen	½
33	(Iran) A Tabatabaei	1½
161	(Chile) P Salinas Herrera	½
97	(Belgium) D Dardha	½
32	(Germany) V Keymer	1½

Third round
1	(Norway) M Carlsen	1½
65	(Norway) A Tari	½
33	(Iran) A Tabatabaei	0
32	(Germany) V Keymer	2

Fourth round
1	(Norway) M Carlsen	3½
32	(Germany) V Keymer	2½

=== Section 2 ===
First round
17	(Uzbekistan) N Abdusattorov	Bye
Bye 17
112	(Turkey) V Şanal	5
145	(Croatia) Z Kožul	3
81	(Spain) E Iturrizaga Bonelli	2½
176	(Mongolia) G Amartüvshin	1½
48	(Ukraine) A Korobov	Bye
-	Bye 48
49	(Ukraine) V Ivanchuk	Bye
-	Bye 49
80	(Chile) C Henriquez Villagra	1½
177	(South Africa) D Cawdery	½
113	(Brazil) LP Supi	3
144	(Egypt) A Fawzy	1
16	(China) Y Wei	Bye
-	Bye 16

Second round
17	(Uzbekistan) N Abdusattorov	½
112	(Turkey) V Şanal	1½
81	(Spain) E Iturrizaga Bonelli	1½
48	(Ukraine) A Korobov	2½
49	(Ukraine) V Ivanchuk	4
80	(Chile) C Henriquez Villagra	2
113	(Brazil) LP Supi	½
16	(China) Y Wei	1½

Third round
112	(Turkey) V Şanal	3
48	(Ukraine) A Korobov	1
49	(Ukraine) V Ivanchuk	2½
16	(China) Y Wei	1½

Fourth round
112	(Turkey) V Şanal	2½
49	(Ukraine) V Ivanchuk	3½

=== Section 3 ===
First round
9	(Azerbaijan) S Mamedyarov	Bye
-	Bye 9
120	(Singapore) J Tin	1½
137	(Ukraine) V Baklan	½
73	(Germany) R Svane	1½
184	(Thailand) P Laohawirapap	½
56	(Croatia) I Šarić	1½
201	(Namibia) D Beukes	½
41	(England) D Howell	Bye
-	Bye 41
88	(Croatia) A Brkić	4½
169	(Ecuador) C Matamoros Franco	3½
105	(Kazakhstan) R Jumabayev	3½
152	(Georgia (country)) L Paichedze	2½
24	(China) H Wang	Bye
-	Bye 24

Second round
9	(Azerbaijan) S Mamedyarov	½
120	(Singapore) J Tin	1½
73	(Germany) R Svane	1½
56	(Croatia) I Šarić	½
41	(England) D Howell	3
88	(Croatia) A Brkić	1
105	(Kazakhstan) R Jumabayev	½
24	(China) H Wang	1½

Third round
120	(Singapore) J Tin	½
73	(Germany) R Svane	1½
41	(England) D Howell	1½
24	(China) H Wang	2½

Fourth round
73	(Germany) R Svane	4
24	(China) H Wang	5

=== Section 4 ===
First round
25	(Spain) F Vallejo Pons	Bye
-	Bye 25
104	(Serbia) V Ivić	3
153	(Turkey) E Gürel	1
89	(Azerbaijan) E Safarli	3
168	(Panama) R Sanchez Alvarez	1
40	(FIDE) A Esipenko	Bye
-	Bye 40
57	(India) S. L. Narayanan	2
200	(Botswana) P Oatlhotse	0
72	(Ukraine) Y Kuzubov	2
185	(Morocco) M Tissir	0
121	(Australia) B Cheng	1½
136	(Azerbaijan) M Iskandarov	2½
8	(India) Gukesh D	Bye
-	Bye 8

Second round
25	(Spain) F Vallejo Pons	2
104	(Serbia) V Ivić	0
89	(Azerbaijan) E Safarli	1
40	(FIDE) A Esipenko	3
57	(India) S. L. Narayanan	1½
72	(Ukraine) Y Kuzubov	½
136	(Azerbaijan) M Iskandarov	0
8	(India) Gukesh D	2

Third round
25	(Spain) F Vallejo Pons	1
40	(FIDE) A Esipenko	3
57	(India) S. L. Narayanan	½
8	(India) Gukesh D	1½

Fourth round
40	(FIDE) A Esipenko	1½
8	(India) Gukesh D	2½

=== Section 5 ===
First round
5	(Netherlands) A Giri	Bye
-	Bye 5
124	(Argentina) F Peralta	2½
133	(FIDE) A Nesterov	3½
69	(Azerbaijan) N Abasov	2
188	(Zimbabwe) R Makoto	0
60	(France) L Fressinet	2
197	(Algeria) M Djabri	0
37	(FIDE) P Svidler	Bye
-	Bye 37
92	(India) A Puranik	2
165	(Mexico) L Ibarra Chami	0
101	(Egypt) A Adly	1½
156	(Brazil) E Amorim Barbosa	½
28	(Netherlands) J van Foreest	Bye
-	Bye 28

Second round
5	(Netherlands) A Giri	2½
133	(FIDE) A Nesterov	1½
69	(Azerbaijan) N Abasov	2½
60	(France) L Fressinet	1½
37	(FIDE) P Svidler	1½
92	(India) A Puranik	½
101	(Egypt) A Adly	½
28	(Netherlands) J van Foreest	1½

Third round
5	(Netherlands) A Giri	3½
69	(Azerbaijan) N Abasov	4½
37	(FIDE) P Svidler	2½
28	(Netherlands) J van Foreest	1½

Fourth round
69	(Azerbaijan) N Abasov	2½
37	(FIDE) P Svidler	1½

=== Section 6 ===
First round
21	(FIDE) D Dubov	Bye
-	Bye 21
108	(India) A Baskaran	3
149	(Andorra) L Henderson de La Fuente	1
85	(Italy) D Vocaturo	2
172	(Bangladesh) R Fahad	0
44	(Ukraine) A Volokitin	Bye
-	Bye 44
53	(United Arab Emirates) S Saleh	2
204	(Ethiopia) A Gezachew Abera	0
76	(Slovenia) A Demchenko	½
181	(Peru) G Leiva	1½
117	(Iran) B Daneshvar	1½
140	(Azerbaijan) M Muradli	½
12	(FIDE) A Grischuk	Bye
-	Bye 12

Second round
21	(FIDE) D Dubov	1½
108	(India) A Baskaran	½
85	(Italy) D Vocaturo	3
44	(Ukraine) A Volokitin	1
53	(United Arab Emirates) S Saleh	1½
181	(Peru) G Leiva	½
117	(Iran) B Daneshvar	5
12	(FIDE) A Grischuk	4

Third round
21	(FIDE) D Dubov	½
85	(Italy) D Vocaturo	1½
53	(United Arab Emirates) S Saleh	2½
117	(Iran) B Daneshvar	1½

Fourth round
85	(Italy) D Vocaturo	1
53	(United Arab Emirates) S Saleh	3

=== Section 7 ===
First round
13	(China) Y Yu	Bye
-	Bye 13
116	(Australia) T Kuybokarov	1½
141	(Ukraine) V Bernadskiy	½
77	(Serbia) A Inđić	2
180	(Tunisia) A Zaibi	0
52	(France) É Bacrot	2
205	(Myanmar) Nay Lin Tun	0
45	(Germany) M Blübaum	Bye
-	Bye 45
84	(FIDE) D Paravyan	1½
173	(Japan) TT Trần	½
109	(Greece) D Mastrovasilis	4
148	(Austria) F Blohberger	2
20	(India) V Gujrathi	Bye
-	Bye 20

Second round
13	(China) Y Yu	1½
116	(Australia) T Kuybokarov	½
77	(Serbia) A Inđić	1½
52	(France) É Bacrot	2½
45	(Germany) M Blübaum	2½
84	(FIDE) D Paravyan	1½
109	(Greece) D Mastrovasilis	3½
20	(India) V Gujrathi	4½

Third round
13	(China) Y Yu	1½
52	(France) É Bacrot	2½
45	(Germany) M Blübaum	4
20	(India) V Gujrathi	5

Fourth round
52	(France) É Bacrot	½
20	(India) V Gujrathi	1½

=== Section 8 ===
First round
29	(Romania) B–D Deac	Bye
-	Bye 29
100	(Poland) K Piorun	2½
157	(Argentina) Pablo Ismael Acosta	3½
93	(Paraguay) A Bachmann	1½
164	(Mongolia) S Bilguun	½
36	(India) N Sarin	Bye
-	Bye 36
61	(Serbia) A Predke	2
196	(Nigeria) O Balogun	0
68	(Azerbaijan) R Mamedov	2
189	(Malaysia) RZ Lim	0
125	(Azerbaijan) V Asadli	2½
132	(Vietnam) MT Lê	1½
4	(FIDE) I Nepomniachtchi	Bye
-	Bye 4

Second round
29	(Romania) B–D Deac	2
157	(Argentina) Pablo Ismael Acosta	0
93	(Paraguay) A Bachmann	0
36	(India) N Sarin	2
61	(Serbia) A Predke	2½
68	(Azerbaijan) R Mamedov	3½
125	(Azerbaijan) V Asadli	½
4	(FIDE) I Nepomniachtchi	1½

Third round
29	(Romania) B–D Deac	1½
36	(India) N Sarin	2½
68	(Azerbaijan) R Mamedov	1½
4	(FIDE) I Nepomniachtchi	2½

Fourth round
36	(India) N Sarin	1
4	(FIDE) I Nepomniachtchi	3

=== Section 9 ===
First round
3	(United States) F Caruana	Bye
-	Bye 3
126	(Lithuania) T Laurušas	1½
131	(Georgia (country)) M Mchedlishvili	2½
67	(Turkey) M Yılmaz	2
190	(Zambia) C Mwali	0
62	(United States) A Liang	1½
195	(Tajikistan) A Karimov	½
35	(United States) R Robson	Bye
-	Bye 35
94	(Brazil) A Fier	1½
163	(Hungary) G Nagy	½
99	(Uzbekistan) S Vokhidov	1½
158	(Azerbaijan) A Gadimbayli	2½
30	(Spain) D Antón Guijarro	Bye
-	Bye 30

Second round
3	(United States) F Caruana	2
131	(Georgia (country)) M Mchedlishvili	0
67	(Turkey) M Yılmaz	4
62	(United States) A Liang	2
35	(United States) R Robson	1½
94	(Brazil) A Fier	½
158	(Azerbaijan) A Gadimbayli	2½
30	(Spain) D Antón Guijarro	1½

Third round
3	(United States) F Caruana	3
67	(Turkey) M Yılmaz	1
35	(United States) R Robson	1½
158	(Azerbaijan) A Gadimbayli	½

Fourth round
3	(United States) F Caruana	1½
35	(United States) R Robson	½

=== Section 10 ===
First round
19	(Iran) P Maghsoodloo	Bye
-	Bye 19
110	(Azerbaijan) A Suleymanli	5½
147	(China) Y Xu	4½
83	(Poland) M Bartel	2½
174	(Egypt) A Hesham	1½
46	(Germany) A Donchenko	Bye
-	Bye 46
51	(Bulgaria) I Cheparinov	1½
206	(Libya) Y Alhassadi	½
78	(Germany) F Svane	1½
179	(South Korea) JH Lee	½
115	(United States) T Gareyev	0
142	(Peru) E Córdova	2
14	(Poland) J-K Duda	Bye
-	Bye 14

Second round
19	(Iran) P Maghsoodloo	1½
110	(Azerbaijan) A Suleymanli	½
83	(Poland) M Bartel	4
46	(Germany) A Donchenko	5
51	(Bulgaria) I Cheparinov	2½
78	(Germany) F Svane	1½
142	(Peru) E Córdova	½
14	(Poland) J-K Duda	1½

Third round
19	(Iran) P Maghsoodloo	1½
46	(Germany) A Donchenko	½
51	(Bulgaria) I Cheparinov	1½
14	(Poland) J-K Duda	2½

Fourth round
19	(Iran) P Maghsoodloo	2½
14	(Poland) J-K Duda	3½

=== Section 11 ===
First round
11	(United States) L Domínguez	Bye
-	Bye 11
118	(Poland) S Gumularz	1
139	(Poland) I Janik	3
75	(Denmark) J Buhl Bjerre	1½
182	(Yemen) B Al Qudaimi	½
54	(Azerbaijan) G Guseinov	1½
203	(Nepal) R Jaiswal	½
43	(Poland) R Wojtaszek	Bye
-	Bye 43
86	(Canada) E Hansen	(Note: Hansen did not show up for his matches due to travel issues.)
171	(Sri Lanka) LMST De Silva	w/o
107	(Azerbaijan) N Mamedov	½
150	(Moldova) I Schitco	1½
22	(United States) S Shankland	Bye
-	Bye 22

Second round
11	(United States) L Domínguez	2
139	(Poland) I Janik	0
75	(Denmark) J Buhl Bjerre	3½
54	(Azerbaijan) G Guseinov	4½
43	(Poland) R Wojtaszek	1½
171	(Sri Lanka) LMST De Silva	½
150	(Moldova) I Schitco	1½
22	(United States) S Shankland	½

Third round
11	(United States) L Domínguez	1½
54	(Azerbaijan) G Guseinov	½
43	(Poland) R Wojtaszek	3
150	(Moldova) I Schitco	1

Fourth round
11	(United States) L Domínguez	3½
43	(Poland) R Wojtaszek	2½

=== Section 12 ===
First round
27	(Romania) K Shevchenko	Bye
-	Bye 27
102	(Israel) I Smirin	5
155	(Colombia) S Avila Pavas	3
91	(United States) C Yoo	(Note: Yoo did not show up for his matches due to travel issues.)
166	(China) R Huang	w/o
38	(Serbia) A Sarana	Bye
-	Bye 38
59	(France) J Moussard	1½
198	(Uganda) H Nsubuga	½
70	(Azerbaijan) V Durarbayli	1½
187	(Mexico) L Figueredo Losada	½
123	(Turkey) E Can	2½
134	(Cuba) L Quesada Pérez	1½
6	(United States) W So	Bye
-	Bye 6

Second round
27	(Romania) K Shevchenko	2
102	(Israel) I Smirin	0
166	(China) R Huang	½
38	(Serbia) A Sarana	1½
59	(France) J Moussard	1½
70	(Azerbaijan) V Durarbayli	½
123	(Turkey) E Can	1½
6	(United States) W So	2½

Third round
27	(Romania) K Shevchenko	½
38	(Serbia) A Sarana	1½
59	(France) J Moussard	2½
6	(United States) W So	3½

Fourth round
38	(Serbia) A Sarana	1½
6	(United States) W So	½

=== Section 13 ===
First round
7	(Azerbaijan) T Radjabov	Bye
-	Bye 7
122	(Hungary) V Erdős	1½
135	(Poland) G Nasuta	½
71	(Uruguay) G Meier	1½
186	(Uruguay) B Roselli	½
58	(Spain) J Santos Latasa	2
199	(Chinese Taipei) C-W Yang	0
39	(Sweden) N Grandelius	Bye
-	Bye 39
90	(FIDE) M Antipov	1½
167	(United States) J Stearman	½
103	(Cuba) C Albornoz Cabrera	2½
154	(Kazakhstan) A Suleymenov	1½
26	(Egypt) B Amin	Bye
-	Bye 26

Second round
7	(Azerbaijan) T Radjabov	1½
122	(Hungary) V Erdős	½
71	(Uruguay) G Meier	1½
58	(Spain) J Santos Latasa	2½
39	(Sweden) N Grandelius	2½
90	(FIDE) M Antipov	1½
103	(Cuba) C Albornoz Cabrera	1½
26	(Egypt) B Amin	2½

Third round
7	(Azerbaijan) T Radjabov	1½
58	(Spain) J Santos Latasa	2½
39	(Sweden) N Grandelius	2½
26	(Egypt) B Amin	1½

Fourth round
58	(Spain) J Santos Latasa	½
39	(Sweden) N Grandelius	1½

=== Section 14 ===
First round
23	(India) A Erigaisi	Bye
-	Bye 23
106	(FIDE) S Azarov	1½
151	(Indonesia) S Megaranto	½
87	(Slovakia) J Pecháč	1½
170	(Philippines) M Paragua	½
42	(Slovenia) V Fedoseev	Bye
-	Bye 42
55	(Uzbekistan) J Sindarov	2
202	(South Sudan) DC Rehan	0
74	(Austria) M Ragger	2½
183	(Egypt) K Wageih	1½
119	(Austria) V Dragnev	1½
138	(Israel) O Kobo	½
10	(France) M Vachier-Lagrave	Bye
-	Bye 10

Second round
23	(India) A Erigaisi	3½
106	(FIDE) S Azarov	2½
87	(Slovakia) J Pecháč	1½
42	(Slovenia) V Fedoseev	2½
55	(Uzbekistan) J Sindarov	2½
74	(Austria) M Ragger	1½
119	(Austria) V Dragnev	1½
10	(France) M Vachier-Lagrave	2½

Third round
23	(India) A Erigaisi	1½
42	(Slovenia) V Fedoseev	½
55	(Uzbekistan) J Sindarov	1½
10	(France) M Vachier-Lagrave	½

Fourth round
23	(India) A Erigaisi	1½
55	(Uzbekistan) J Sindarov	½

=== Section 15 ===
First round
15	(Vietnam) LQ Lê	Bye
-	Bye 15
114	(Czech Republic) P Michalik	½
143	(Serbia) I Ivanišević	1½
79	(Germany) D Kollars	1½
178	(Bangladesh) E Hossain	½
50	(Ukraine) R Ponomariov	Bye
-	Bye 50
47	(Israel) B Gelfand	Bye
-	Bye 47
82	(Hungary) F Berkes	2½
175	(Iran) P Darini	1½
111	(Germany) D Fridman	1½
146	(Greece) S Kourkoulos-Arditis	½
18	(FIDE) N Vitiugov	Bye
-	Bye 18

Second round
15	(Vietnam) LQ Lê	3
143	(Serbia) I Ivanišević	1
79	(Germany) D Kollars	3
50	(Ukraine) R Ponomariov	5
47	(Israel) B Gelfand	½
82	(Hungary) F Berkes	1½
111	(Germany) D Fridman	½
18	(FIDE) N Vitiugov	1½

Third round
15	(Vietnam) LQ Lê	2½
50	(Ukraine) R Ponomariov	3½
82	(Hungary) F Berkes	2½
18	(FIDE) N Vitiugov	1½

Fourth round
50	(Ukraine) R Ponomariov	½
82	(Hungary) F Berkes	1½

=== Section 16 ===
First round
31	(India) R Praggnanandhaa	Bye
-	Bye 31
98	(France) M Lagarde	1½
159	(Brazil) Y De Moura Santiago	½
95	(Germany) N Huschenbeth	1½
162	(Madagascar) F Rakotomaharo	½
34	(Czech Republic) D Navara	Bye
-	Bye 34
63	(Hungary) B Gledura	1½
194	(Kyrgyzstan) E Orozbaev	½
66	(Uzbekistan) N Yakubboev	2
191	(Syria) M Koniahli	0
127	(India) V Karthik	1½
130	(United States) G Kaidanov	½
2	(United States) H Nakamura	Bye
-	Bye 2

Second round
31	(India) R Praggnanandhaa	1½
98	(France) M Lagarde	½
95	(Germany) N Huschenbeth	2
34	(Czech Republic) D Navara	4
63	(Hungary) B Gledura	2½
66	(Uzbekistan) N Yakubboev	1½
127	(India) V Karthik	1½
2	(United States) H Nakamura	2½

Third round
31	(India) R Praggnanandhaa	1½
34	(Czech Republic) D Navara	½
63	(Hungary) B Gledura	½
2	(United States) H Nakamura	1½

Fourth round
31	(India) R Praggnanandhaa	3
2	(United States) H Nakamura	1

== Rounds 5–8 ==
Fifth round
1	(Norway) Magnus Carlsen	2
49	(Ukraine) Vasyl Ivanchuk	0
24	(China) Wang Hao	½
8	(India) Gukesh Dommaraju	1½
69	(Azerbaijan) Nijat Abasov	2
53	(United Arab Emirates) Salem Saleh	0
20	(India) Vidit Gujrathi	4
4	(FIDE) Ian Nepomniachtchi	2
3	(United States) Fabiano Caruana	1½
14	(Poland) Jan-Krzysztof Duda	½
11	(United States) Leinier Domínguez	1½
38	(Serbia) Alexey Sarana	½
39	(Sweden) Nils Grandelius	½
23	(India) Arjun Erigaisi	1½
82	(Hungary) Ferenc Berkes	½
31	(India) R Praggnanandhaa	1½

Quarterfinals
1	(Norway) Magnus Carlsen	1½
8	(India) Gukesh Dommaraju	½
69	(Azerbaijan) Nijat Abasov	1½
20	(India) Vidit Gujrathi	½
3	(United States) Fabiano Caruana	1½
11	(United States) Leinier Domínguez	½
23	(India) Arjun Erigaisi	4
31	(India) R Praggnanandhaa	5

Semi-finals
1	(Norway) Magnus Carlsen	1½
69	(Azerbaijan) Nijat Abasov	½
3	(United States) Fabiano Caruana	2½
31	(India) R Praggnanandhaa	3½

Final
1	(Norway) Magnus Carlsen	2½
31	(India) R Praggnanandhaa	1½
Third place
69	(Azerbaijan) Nijat Abasov	1
3	(United States) Fabiano Caruana	3

=== Third place ===
Seed	Name	Aug 2023 rating	1	2	R1	R2	Total
69	(Azerbaijan) Nijat Abasov	2632	1	0	0	0	1
3	(United States) Fabiano Caruana	2782	0	1	1	1	3

=== Finals ===
Seed	Name	Aug 2023 rating	1	2	R1	R2	Total
1	(Norway) Magnus Carlsen	2835	½	½	1	½	2½
31	(India) R Praggnanandhaa	2690	½	½	0	½	1½
