= Juan Carlos Obregon Rivero =

Cuban-Mexican chess grandmaster (born 1993)

Personal information
- Born: September 8, 1989 (age 36) Las Tunas, Cuba

Chess career
- Country: Cuba (until 2022); Mexico (since 2022)
- Title: Grandmaster (2020)
- FIDE rating: 2468 (July 2026)
- Peak rating: 2560 (May 2015)

Juan Carlos Obregon Rivero is a Cuban-Mexican chess grandmaster.

== Career ==
In August 2021, he finished third in the Mexican Open, behind Jorge Cori and Sandro Mareco.

In February 2022, he tied for second place alongside Jaime Santos Latasa, Guillermo Vázquez, Jorge Cori, Emilio Córdova, and Carlos Daniel Albornoz Cabrera in the Iberoamericano Championship.

In November 2023, he won the Mexican Chess Championship ahead of Leonel Figueredo Losada due to better tiebreaks.
