= Ernesto Fernández Romero =

Spanish chess grandmaster (born 1983)

Personal information
- Born: January 23, 1983 (age 43) Málaga, Spain

Chess career
- Country: Spain
- Title: Grandmaster (2018)
- FIDE rating: 2511 (November 2026)
- Peak rating: 2511 (September 2013)

Ernesto Fernández Romero (born 23 January 1983) is a Spanish chess Grandmaster and FIDE Trainer.

== Chess career ==
Fernández Romero began playing chess at six years old. He reached a peak FIDE rating of 2511 in September 2023 and was officially awarded the Grandmaster title by FIDE in 2018.

In 2017, he achieved several notable tournament performances. He tied for third place at the IV Torneo Internacional Campus Ourense with a score of 6.5/9. That same year, he took clear first place without losing a game at both the III Torneo Internacional Vila de Noia and the XXXII Torneo Internacional de Ajedrez Cidade de Ferrol, scoring 7.5/9 in both events.

Throughout his career, Fernández Romero has represented Spain seven times in European and World Team Championships.

As a coach and FIDE Trainer, he has worked with prominent players including Grandmasters Paco Vallejo and Lance Henderson.
