= Filip Haring =

Slovak chess grandmaster (born 2003)

Personal information
- Born: September 25, 2003 (age 23) Banská Bystrica, Slovakia

Chess career
- Country: Slovakia
- Title: Grandmaster (2025)
- FIDE rating: 2462 (November 2026)
- Peak rating: 2503 (August 2024)

Filip Haring is a Slovak chess grandmaster.

== Chess career ==
In August 2022, he won the Slovak Open with a score of 7/9, prevailing against grandmaster Jerguš Pecháč on tiebreak scores. He also earned his first GM norm at the event.

He was awarded the Grandmaster title in 2025, after achieving his norms at the:

- Slovak Open in August 2022
- Vezerkepzo GM tournament in April 2024
- Gambit GM Closed Tournament in September 2025
