= Yago De Moura Santiago =

Brazilian chess grandmaster (born 1992)

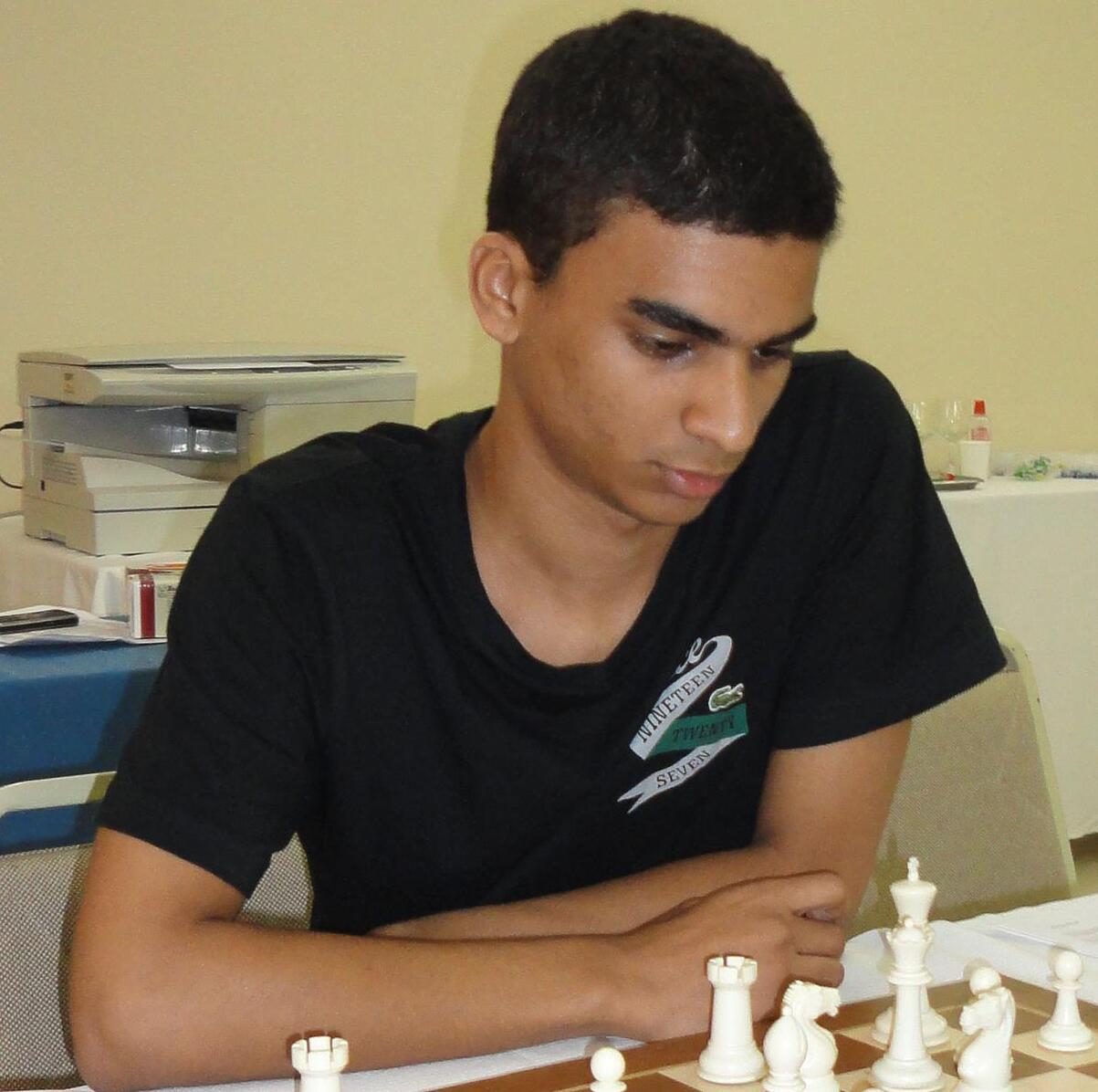
- Santiago in 2012

Personal information
- Born: April 17, 1992 (age 34)

Chess career
- Country: Brazil
- Title: Grandmaster (2017)
- FIDE rating: 2466 (November 2026)
- Peak rating: 2513 (July 2022)

Yago De Moura Santiago (born 17 April 1992) is a Brazilian chess player. He was awarded the Grandmaster title by FIDE in 2017.

== Career ==
Santiago came second in the 2022 Brazilian Chess Championship and second in the 2022 Cabo Verde Chess Open. He qualified for the Chess World Cup 2023, where he was defeated by Maxime Lagarde in the first round.
