= Fernando Peralta (chess player) =

Argentine chess grandmaster (born 1979)

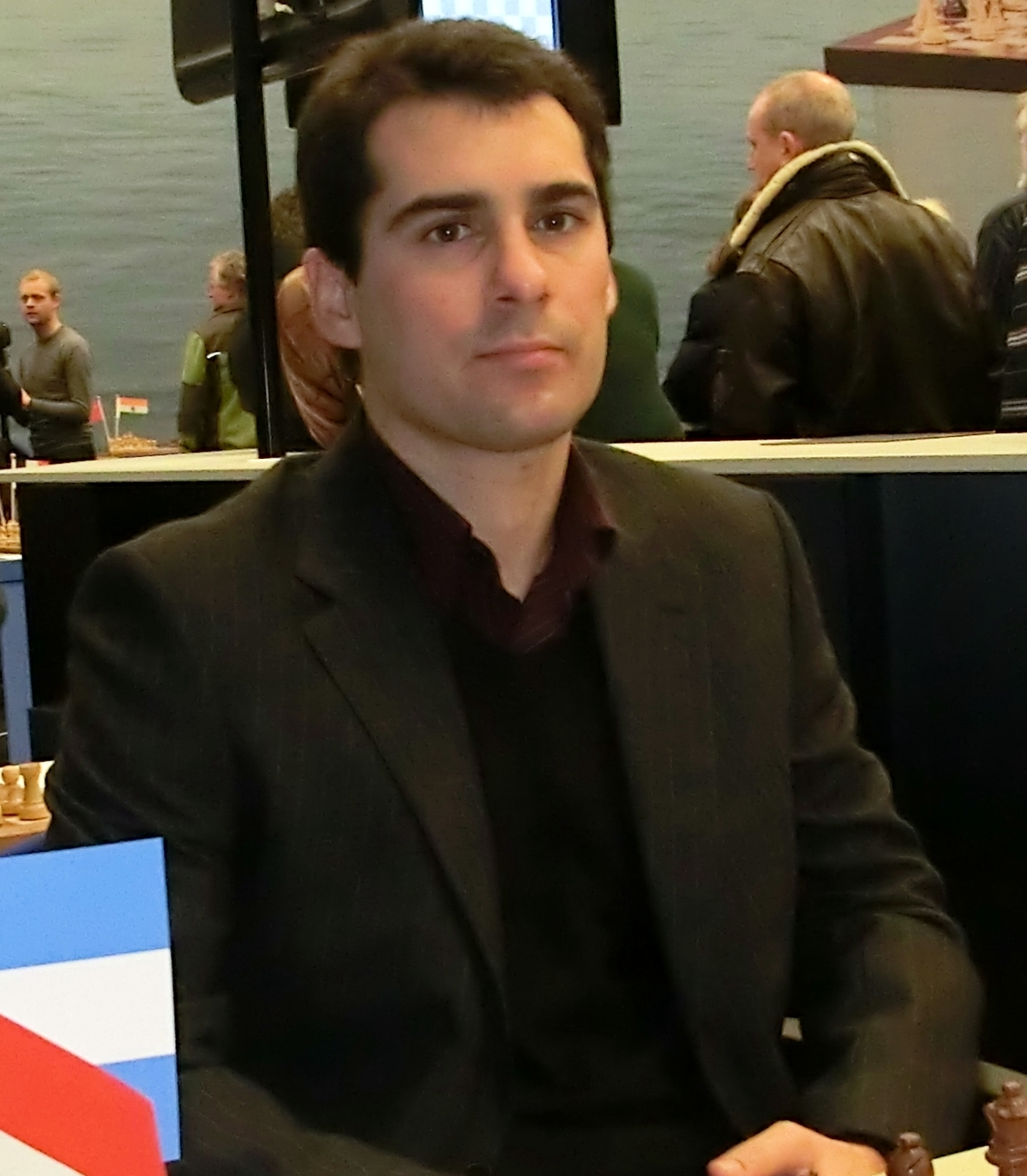
- Peralta in 2013

Personal information
- Born: December 16, 1979 (age 46) Lomas de Zamora, Argentina

Chess career
- Country: Argentina
- Title: Grandmaster (2004)
- FIDE rating: 2548 (July 2026)
- Peak rating: 2632 (February 2013)

Fernando Rodrigo Peralta Marenco is an Argentine chess grandmaster.

== Chess career ==
In 1997, Peralta won the Pan American Junior Chess Championship. He has since represented Argentina in multiple Chess Olympiads.

Peralta competed in the 2007 Chess World Cup, where he was defeated by Ernesto Inarkiev in the first round.

Peralta is a three-time Argentine Chess Champion, winning the title in 2006, 2018, and 2022. He clinched the 2022 title ahead of Leandro Krysa and Sandro Mareco by defeating Pablo Ismael Acosta in the final round.

Peralta competed in the Chess World Cup 2023, where he was defeated by Arseniy Nesterov in the first round.
