= Marc'Andria Maurizzi =

French chess grandmaster (born 2007)

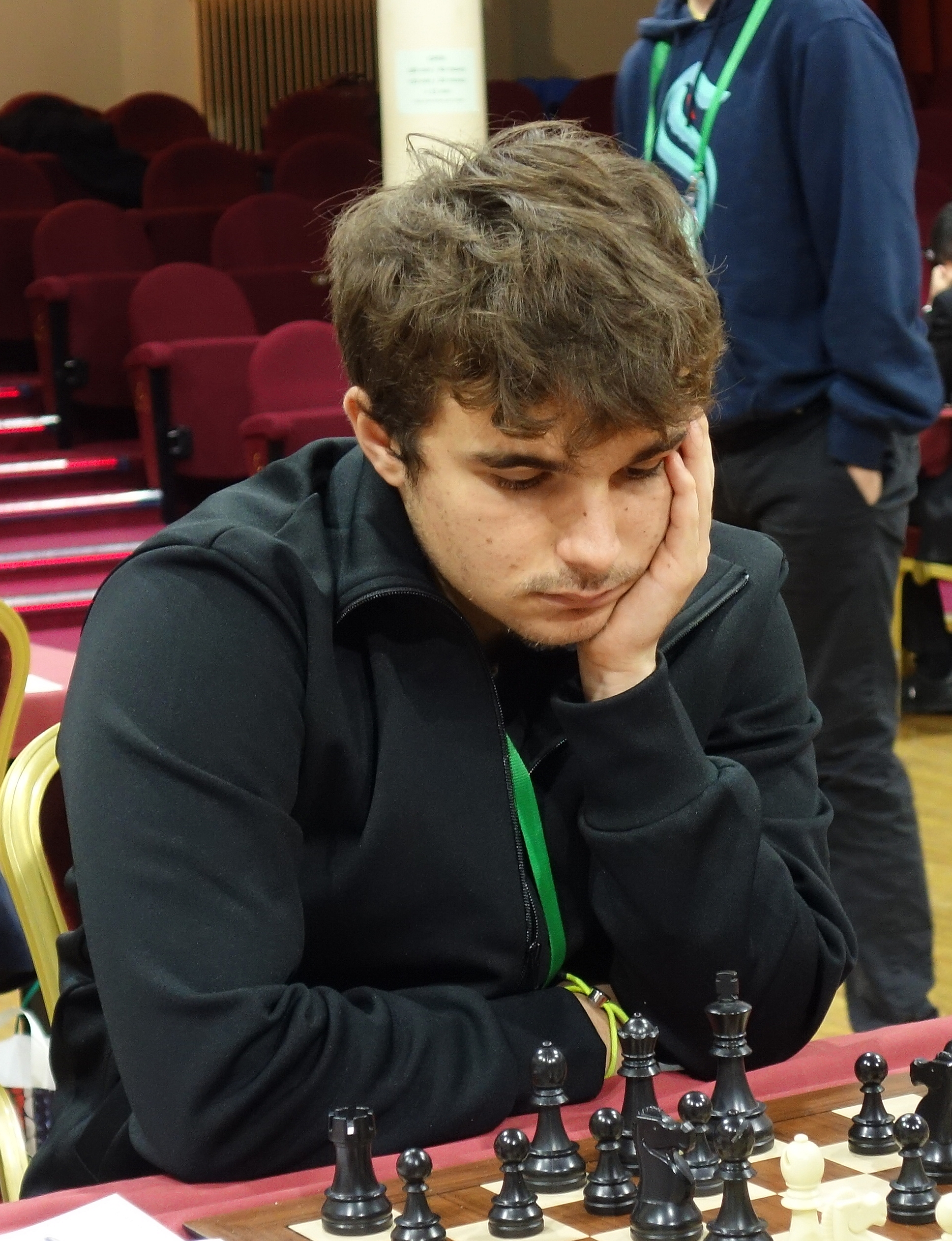
- Maurizzi in 2023

Personal information
- Born: 16 May 2007 (age 19) Bastia, France

Chess career
- Country: France
- Title: Grandmaster (2021)
- FIDE rating: 2624 (October 2026)
- Peak rating: 2641 (November 2026)
- Peak ranking: No. 78 (November 2026)

Marc'Andria Maurizzi (born 16 May 2007) is a French chess grandmaster and the 2023 World Junior Champion. He won the French Championship in 2025.

== Chess career ==
Maurizzi earned his Grandmaster title in 2021, a few days after turning fourteen, becoming the youngest French player to achieve the title.

In 2023, Maurizzi participated in the World Junior Chess Championship, where he was the fourth seed. He finished the tournament in equal first place with three other people: GMs Arseniy Nesterov, Luka Budisavljevic, and Mamikon Gharibyan. He won the title on tiebreaks, and finished the tournament on 8.5/11 (+6−0=5). (Note: 6 wins, 0 losses, and 5 draws, including a forfeit win against Amanmuhammet Hommadov (2070), 5 wins against FM Noah Fecker (2396), IM Tobias Koelle (2458), IM Andy Woodward (2480), GM Anand Pranav (2509), and GM Ivan Schitco (2533), and 5 draws against GM Arseniy Nesterov (2575), IM Elham Amar (2541), GM Santiago Avila Pavas (2510), GM Jan Subelj (2492), and GM Luka Budisavljevic (2492). The numbers in brackets represent the opponents' elo rating.)

Maurizzi played in the Challengers section of the Tata Steel Chess Tournament 2024, where he led by a full point (8½/11) after 11 rounds. He ultimately finished tied for second place with Daniel Dardha and behind winner Leon Luke Mendonca.

In February 2025, Maurizzi won the Djerba Masters with a score of 7.5/9, ahead of Daniel Dardha and Parham Maghsoodloo.

In August 2025, Maurizzi won the National Championship, where he defeated the two-time National Champion Laurent Fressinet during tiebreaks in final.
