= Austin Yang Ching-Wei =

Taiwanese chess player (born 1998)

Personal information
- Born: January 12, 1998 (age 28)

Chess career
- Country: Chinese Taipei
- Title: FIDE Master (2014)
- Peak rating: 2220 (November 2016)

Austin Yang Ching-Wei (born January 12, 1998) is a Taiwanese chess player.

== Chess career ==
In October 2010, Yang played in the Open U12 section of the World Youth Chess Championship, where he finished 95th in a field of 150 players with a score of 5/11.

In May 2011, Yang participated in the Asian Individual Chess championship, where he was defeated by Vaibhav Suri.

In September 2016, Yang represented Chinese Taipei at the 42nd Chess Olympiad, helping his team defeat Nepal in the 10th round. He also notably held a draw against grandmaster Colin McNab in the seventh round.

In May 2023, Yang finished tied for third place with Oleg Badmatsyrenov in the Big Rook Chess Festival held in Bangkok, Thailand.

Yang qualified for the Chess World Cup 2023, becoming the first person from Chinese Taipei to play in a Chess World Cup. At the event, he was defeated by Jaime Santos Latasa in the first round.
