= Georg Meier (chess player) =

German chess grandmaster (born 1987)

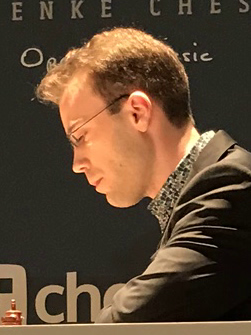
- Meier in 2019

Personal information
- Born: August 26, 1987 (age 38) Trier, Germany
- Spouse: Inna Agrest

Chess career
- Country: Germany (until 2021); Uruguay (since 2021)
- Title: Grandmaster (2007)
- FIDE rating: 2612 (July 2026)
- Peak rating: 2671 (January 2012)
- Peak ranking: No. 65 (September 2009)

Georg Meier (born August 26, 1987) is a German-Uruguayan chess grandmaster who represents Uruguay. Due to the German Chess Federation's handling of his conflict with top German player Elisabeth Pähtz, he switched to the Uruguayan Chess Federation.

== Chess career ==
Meier competed in the Chess World Cup in 2009, defeating Tigran L. Petrosian in the first round before being eliminated by Maxime Vachier-Lagrave. In the Chess World Cup 2023, he again reached the second round, defeating Bernardo Roselli in the first round, before losing to Jaime Santos Latasa.

In December 2009, Meier tied for 1st–4th places with Julio Granda, Viktor Láznička and Kiril Georgiev in the 19th Magistral Pamplona Tournament. In 2014, he shared second place with Peter Leko in the Dortmund Sparkassen Chess Meeting, which was won by Fabiano Caruana. Meier won the main Grandmaster tournament at the 2017 Maccabiah Games in Jerusalem, ahead of Ukrainian Alexander Moiseenko.

In team events, he played for Germany in the Chess Olympiad, World Team Chess Championship, European Team Chess Championship and Mitropa Cup. His team won the gold medal in the 2011 European Team Championship in Porto Carras, Greece.

Citing mobbing issues with another chess player inside the German Chess Federation, Meier announced that he would leave the federation and play for Uruguay instead. The change-over became official on November 1, 2021.
