= Ori Kobo =

Israeli chess grandmaster (born 1997)

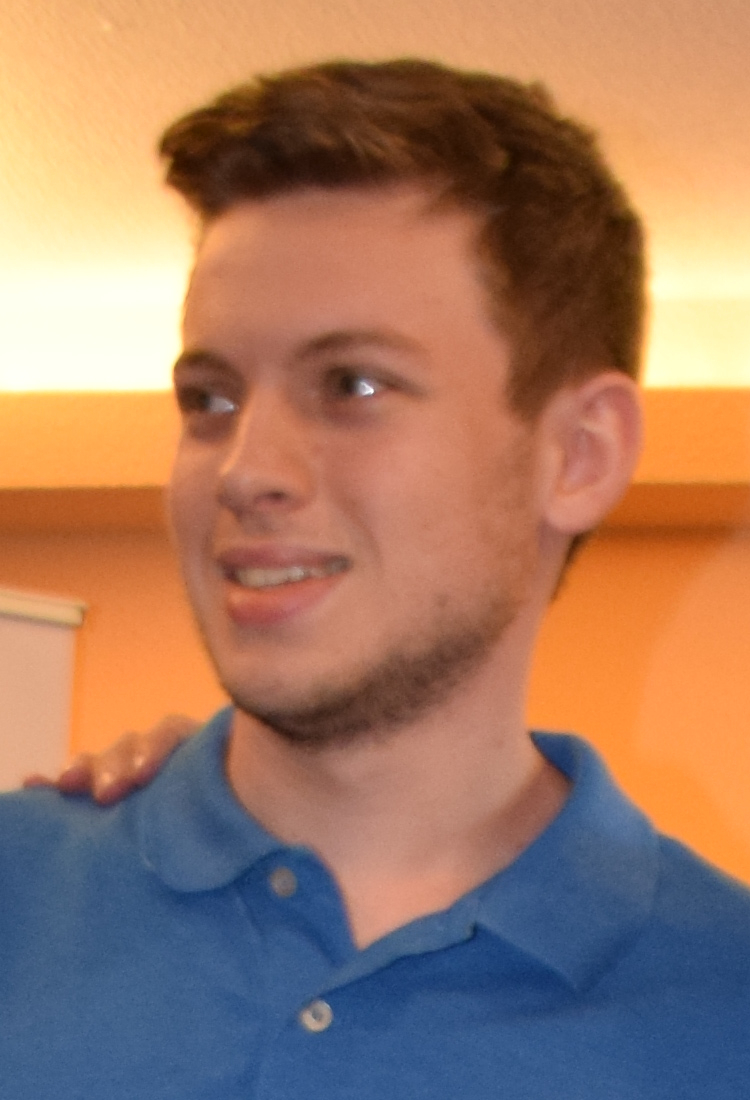
- Kobo in 2017

Personal information
- Native name: אורי קובו
- Born: April 24, 1997 (age 29) Jerusalem, Israel

Chess career
- Country: Israel
- Title: Grandmaster (2017)
- FIDE rating: 2479 (August 2026)
- Peak rating: 2559 (May 2023)

Ori Kobo (Hebrew: אורי קובו; born April 24, 1997) is an Israeli chess grandmaster.

== Chess career ==
In November 2022, he was part of the Israeli team alongside Maxim Rodshtein, Tamir Nabaty, Avital Boruchovsky, Ilia Smirin, and Evgeny Postny in the World Team Championship.

In December 2022, he finished 6th in the Israeli Chess Championship.

In July 2023, he was defeated by Alexander Donchenko in a 96-move game in the Sportland NRW Cup.

Kobo competed in the Chess World Cup 2023, where he was defeated by Valentin Dragnev in the first round.
