= Deng Cypriano Rehan =

South Sudanese chess player (born 1982)

Personal information
- Born: 1982 (age 43–44)

Chess career
- Country: South Sudan
- Title: Candidate Master (2026)
- Peak rating: 2148 (November 2018)

Deng Cypriano Rehan is a South Sudanese chess player.

== Chess career ==
In 2017, Rehan defeated Haruna Nsubuga in the third round and top-seeded player Arthur Ssegwanyi in the fourth round of the Uganda Open Chess Championship.

In 2018, Rehan captained the South Sudan team in the 43rd Chess Olympiad, where they won a gold medal in Group E.

Rehan participated in the 44th Chess Olympiad in 2022, though the team lost to the India-C team. He scored 4.5/9, defeating Elvira Berend and drawing against Nderim Saraçi.

Rehan competed in the Chess World Cup 2023, where he was defeated by Javokhir Sindarov in the first round.
