= Levan Pantsulaia =

Georgian chess grandmaster (born 1986)

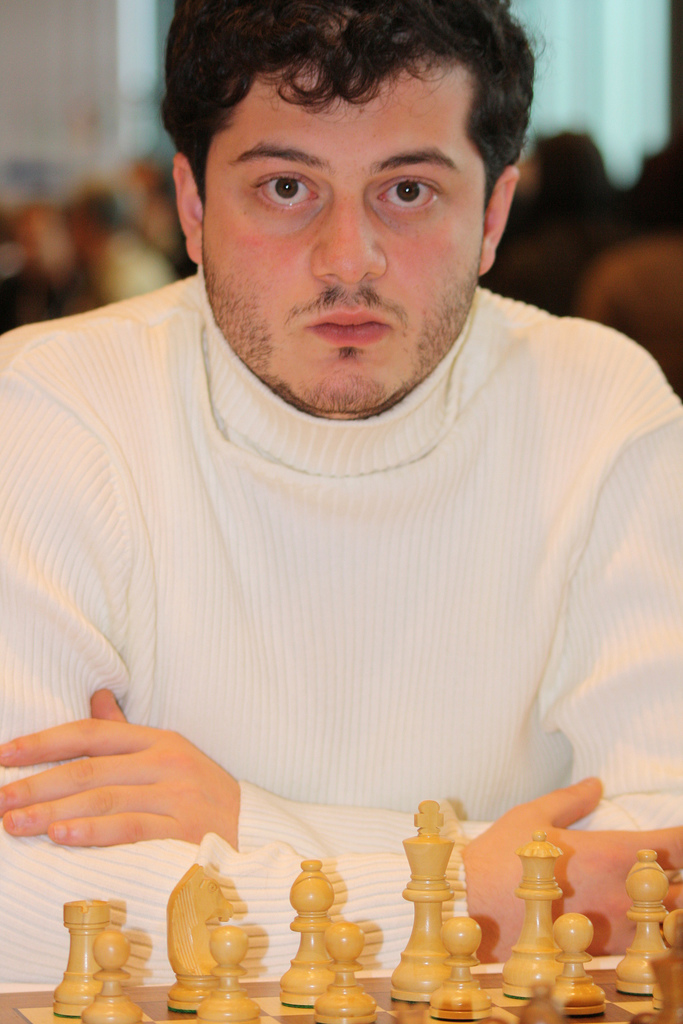
- Chess Olympiad Dresden 2008

Personal information
- Born: February 26, 1986 (age 40)

Chess career
- Country: Georgia
- Title: Grandmaster (2005)
- FIDE rating: 2493 (July 2026)
- Peak rating: 2629 (January 2008)
- Peak ranking: No. 94 (January 2008)

Levan Pantsulaia (Georgian: ლევან ფანცულაია; born February 26, 1986) is a Georgian chess grandmaster.

== Career ==
He has competed at a number of chess olympiads, including 2008, 2010 and 2016.

He played in the Chess World Cup 2017, and was knocked out by Jan-Krzysztof Duda in the first round.

He played in the Chess World Cup 2023, defeating Harsha Bharathakoti in the first round. He was knocked out by Magnus Carlsen in the second round.
