= Huang Renjie =

Chinese chess player (born 2004)

Personal information
- Born: January 22, 2004 (age 22) Qingdao, Shandong, China

Chess career
- Country: China
- FIDE rating: 2490 (July 2026)
- Peak rating: 2516 (February 2026)

Huang Renjie (simplified Chinese: 黄仁杰; traditional Chinese: 黃仁傑; born 2004) is a Chinese chess player. Although not holding any FIDE titles, he has a peak rating of 2514, above the rating requirement for a Grandmaster.

== Chess career ==
Huang participated in the Chess World Cup 2023 where he was knocked out by Alexey Sarana in the second round with a 1½-½ loss.
