= Dante Beukes =

Namibian chess player (born 2003)

Personal information
- Born: January 17, 2003 (age 23) Windhoek, Namibia

Chess career
- Country: Namibia
- Title: International Master (2020)
- Peak rating: 2324 (September 2026)

Dante Matthew Beukes (born 2003) is a Namibian chess player who holds the title of International Master (2020).

== Chess career ==
Beukes was second in the 2022 South African Open, finishing on 9/11.

Beukes qualified for the Chess World Cup 2023, where he was defeated by Ivan Šarić in the first round.
