= Harsha Bharathakoti =

Indian chess grandmaster (born 2000)

Personal information
- Born: 7 February 2000 (age 26) Guntur, India

Chess career
- Country: India
- Title: Grandmaster (2019)
- FIDE rating: 2510 (July 2026)
- Peak rating: 2608 (March 2023)

Harsha Bharathakoti is an Indian chess grandmaster.

== Chess career ==
In November 2022, Harsha finished as runner-up in the Asian Continental Championship, losing to R Praggnanandhaa as a result of drawing against Shamsiddin Vokhidov.

In March 2023, Harsha finished as runner-up in the Cappelle-la-Grande Open. He then won the Chessemy Blitz Open by defeating Diptayan Ghosh in the Armageddon round.

Harsha competed in the Chess World Cup 2023, where he was defeated by Levan Pantsulaia in the first round.
