= Arseniy Nesterov =

Russian chess grandmaster (born 2003)

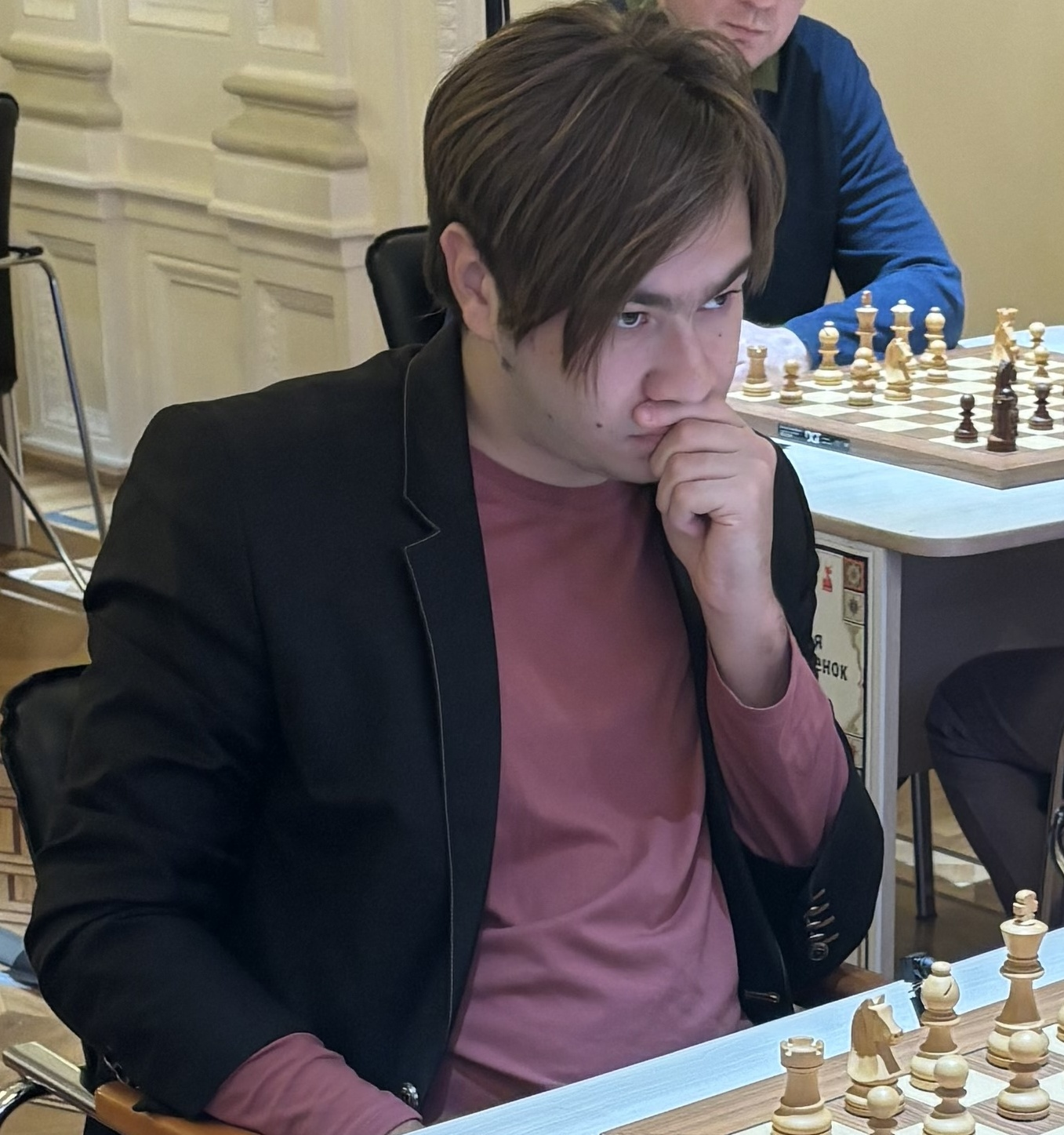
- Nesterov in 2025

Personal information
- Born: Arseniy Yurievich Nesterov; 20 January 2003 (age 23) Saint Petersburg, Russia

Chess career
- Country: Russia (until 2022); FIDE (since 2022)
- Title: Grandmaster (2020)
- FIDE rating: 2593 (July 2026)
- Peak rating: 2609 (June 2024)

Arseniy Yurievich Nesterov (Russian: Арсений Юрьевич Нестеров; born 20 January 2003) is a Russian chess grandmaster. He won the Russian Chess Championship in 2025.

== Chess career ==
Nesterov was born in Saint Petersburg on 20 January 2003.

In May 2018, he led the pack at the start of the Vanya Somov stage of the European Youth Grand Prix alongside Shant Sargsyan. He ultimately finished in 10th place out of 12 players.

In February 2020, Nesterov obtained his final GM norm at the Aeroflot Open 2020 held in Moscow. In September 2022, he participated in the 75th Russian Chess Championship, finishing last in a field of 12 players.

Nesterov competed in the Chess World Cup 2023, where he defeated Fernando Peralta in the first round, but was defeated by Anish Giri in the second round.

Nesterov participated in the 2023 World Junior Chess Championship, where he finished the tournament in equal first place with Marc'Andria Maurizzi, Luka Budisavljevic, and Mamikon Gharibyan. He lost the title to Maurizzi on tiebreaks.

In October 2025, he won the 78th Russian Chess Championship with 6½/11, undefeated ahead of Vadim Zvjaginsev, Daniil Dubov and Andrey Esipenko.
