= Yuanchen Zhang =

Canadian chess player (born 2001)

Personal information
- Born: 2001 (age 24–25) Shenyang, China

Chess career
- Country: Canada
- Title: International Master (2022)
- Peak rating: 2370 (May 2022)

Yuanchen Zhang (born 2001) is a Canadian chess International Master (2022), Canadian Chess Championship winner (2022).

== Chess career ==
In 2011, Zhang won the Canadian Youth Chess Championship in U10 age group and participated in World Youth Chess Championship in U10 age group where ranked in 9th place.

In 2022, Zhang won the Canadian Chess Championship and won the right to participate in the Chess World Cup. That same year, he was awarded the FIDE International Master (IM) title.

In 2023, at Baku, Zhang participated in single-elimination Chess World Cup and lost in 1st round to Czech Grandmaster Thai Dai Van Nguyen.

== Personal life ==
He studied financial analysis and risk management at the University of Waterloo.
