= Lim Zhuo Ren =

Malaysian chess player (born 1992)

Personal information
- Born: April 30, 1992 (age 34)

Chess career
- Country: Malaysia
- Title: FIDE Master (2014)
- Peak rating: 2332 (September 2025)

Lim Zhuo Ren is a Malaysian chess player.

== Chess career ==
Lim won the 2011 Malaysian Chess Championship, which allowed him to play on the Olympiad team. He was the top scorer for Malaysia in the 40th Chess Olympiad.

In December 2019, Lim earned his third and final IM norm at the 2019 SEA Games held in the Philippines. He now only needs to surpass the 2400 rating mark to earn the IM title.

In 2022, Lim represented Malaysia at the 44th Chess Olympiad.

Lim won the Malaysian Chess Championship for a second time in 2023, which allowed him to play in the Chess World Cup 2023. At the event, he was defeated by Rauf Mamedov in the first round.
