= Abdulla Gadimbayli =

Azerbaijani chess grandmaster (born 2002)

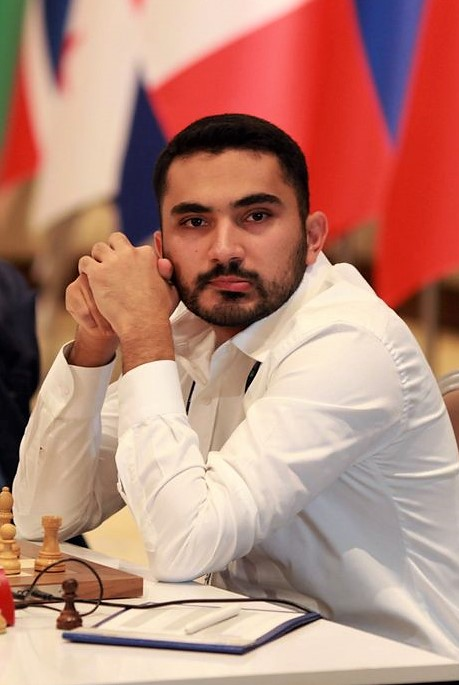
- Gadimbayli in 2023

Personal information
- Born: 2 January 2002 (age 24) Baku, Azerbaijan

Chess career
- Country: Azerbaijan
- Title: Grandmaster (2022)
- FIDE rating: 2505 (October 2026)
- Peak rating: 2524 (November 2022)

Abdulla Gadimbayli (Azerbaijani: Abdulla Qədimbəyli; born 2 January 2002) is an Azerbaijani chess grandmaster (2022). He was the winner of the Azerbaijani Chess Championship in 2018.

== Biography ==
Abdulla Gadimbayli repeatedly represented Azerbaijan at the European Youth Chess Championships and World Youth Chess Championships in different age groups, where he won three gold medals: in 2009, at the European Youth Chess Championship in the U08 age group, and in 2010, at the European and World Youth Chess Championships in the U08 age group. In 2016, he played for Azerbaijan in World Youth U16 Chess Olympiad.

In 2018, Abdulla Gadimbayli won Azerbaijani Chess Championship.

Abdulla Gadimbayli played for Azerbaijan-3 team in the Chess Olympiad:

- In 2016, at third board in the 42nd Chess Olympiad in Baku (+4, =3, -2).

In 2017, he was awarded the FIDE International Master (IM) title.

In 2022, he won the World Junior Chess Championship on tiebreaks, with a score of 8/11 (+5, =6, -0), directly gaining the Grandmaster (GM) title as a result.

Gadimbayli played in the Chess World Cup 2023, where he defeated Shamsiddin Vokhidov in the first round and then caused an upset by defeating the tournament's 30th seed David Antón Guijarro in the second round.
