= Vahap Şanal =

Turkish chess grandmaster (born 1998)

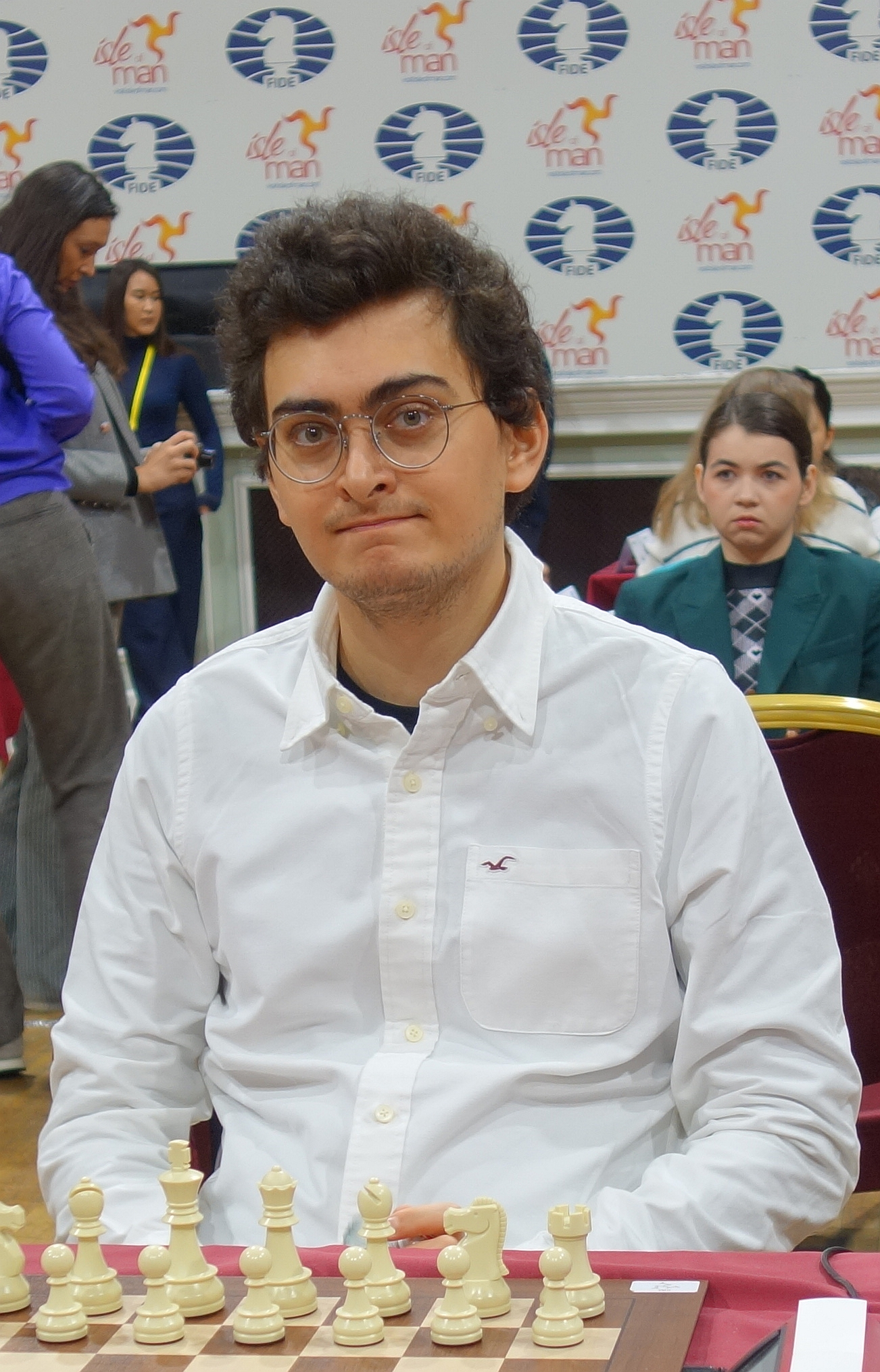

Personal information
- Born: May 26, 1998 (age 28) İzmir, Turkey

Chess career
- Country: Turkey
- Title: Grandmaster (2016)
- FIDE rating: 2555 (July 2026)
- Peak rating: 2608 (November 2023)

Vahap Şanal (born 26 May 1998) is a Turkish chess grandmaster and two-time Turkish Chess Champion.

== Chess career ==
In 2006, Şanal became the youngest player on the Turkish national team at the age of eight and defeated world champion Magnus Carlsen in an online blitz game in 2019.

Şanal won the 4th World Schools Chess Championships, U11 section in 2008, scoring 8.5/9, and becoming a Candidate master in the process. In 2012, he won the European School Championship Open 15, scoring 8.5/9, and also became a FIDE Master that year.

He won the Turkish Chess Championship in 2019 and 2020.

He qualified to play in the Chess World Cup 2021 and Chess World Cup 2023. Şanal took part in the 23rd European Chess Championship and won the individual bronze medal for his board.

In 2022, Şanal played first board at Turkish Chess Super League. He scored 9/12 winning the first board prize with performance of 2796.

Sanal became the first Turkish chess player to reach the fourth round of Chess World Cup by eliminating Nodirbek Abdusattorov in the second round and Anton Korobov in the third round of the Chess World Cup 2023. He was defeated by Vasyl Ivanchuk in the fourth round in tiebreaks.
