= Josiah Stearman =

American chess player (born 2003)

Personal information
- Born: August 30, 2003 (age 22) Berkeley, California, U.S.

Chess career
- Country: United States
- Title: International Master (2021)
- FIDE rating: 2481 (July 2026)
- Peak rating: 2482 (June 2024)

Josiah P. Stearman (born August 30, 2003) is an American chess International Master (2021).

== Chess career ==
In 2021, Stearman was awarded the FIDE International Master (IM) title.He also achieved 2nd place in the North American Junior Chess Championship.

In 2023, Stearman achieved 4th place in the American Continental Chess Championship, winning the right to participate in the Chess World Cup 2023. In the World Cup, he lost in the 1st round to Grandmaster Mikhail Antipov.

In November 2023, Stearman earned his final GM norm at the 1000GM 2023 NY GM A Fall Invitational in New York. He will be awarded the Grandmaster title once his rating surpasses 2500.
