= Rupesh Jaiswal =

Nepali chess player (born 1998)

Personal information
- Born: February 9, 1998 (age 28)

Chess career
- Country: Nepal
- Title: FIDE Master (2015)
- Peak rating: 2238 (May 2015)

Rupesh Jaiswal (born 1998) is a Nepali chess player who holds the title of FIDE master. He was the first Nepali player to represent Nepal at Chess World Cup 2023 in Azerbaijan.

== Chess career ==
He is the first Nepali person to play in the FIDE Chess World Cup 2023 in Azerbaijan, where he lost one game and drew one game against Azerbaijani grandmaster Gadir Guseinov.

Currently, his FIDE rating is 2131 as of September 2023. He is one of the top-rated chess players in Nepal.
