= Xu Yinglun =

Chinese chess grandmaster (born 1996)

Personal information
- Born: December 3, 1996 (age 29) Harbin, China

Chess career
- Country: China
- Title: Grandmaster (2017)
- FIDE rating: 2516 (July 2026)
- Peak rating: 2565 (September 2019)

Xu Yinglun (Chinese: 徐英伦; born December 3, 1996) is a Chinese chess grandmaster.

== Chess career ==
In April 2017, Xu achieved his final GM norm at the Sharjah Masters.

In May 2021, Xu finished 6th in the Chinese Chess Championship.

In November 2022, Xu finished 10th in the Chinese Chess Championship.

Xu played in the Chess World Cup 2023, where he was defeated by Aydin Suleymanli in the first round.
