= Daniele Vocaturo =

Italian chess grandmaster (born 1989)

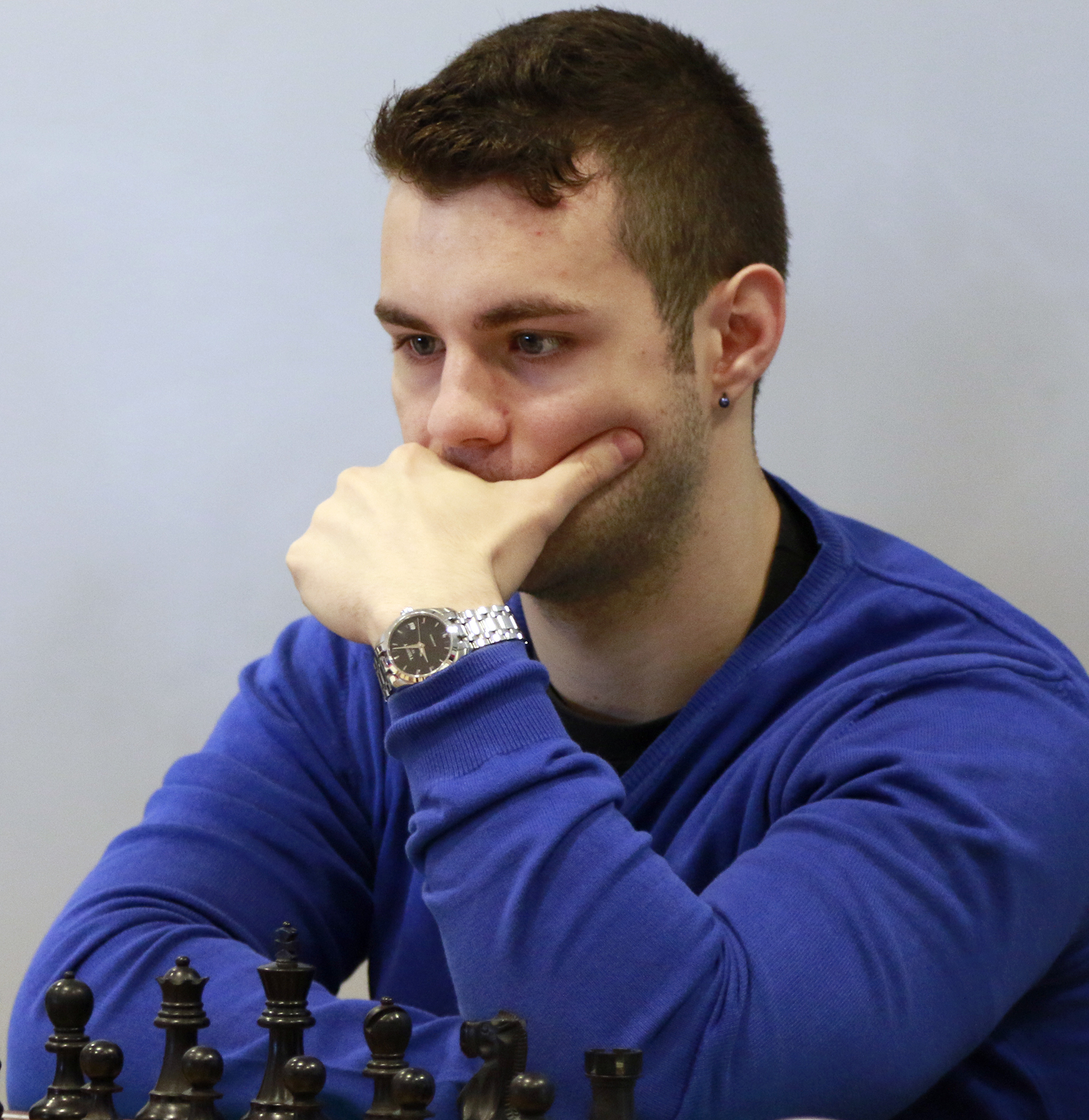
- Vocaturo in 2015

Personal information
- Born: 16 December 1989 (age 36) Rome, Italy

Chess career
- Country: Italy
- Title: Grandmaster (2009)
- FIDE rating: 2561 (July 2026)
- Peak rating: 2632 (October 2021)

Daniele Vocaturo (born 16 December 1989) is an Italian chess player who holds the FIDE title of Grandmaster. He is the No. 1 ranked Italian player as of August 2025, as has been since May 2016.

== Chess career ==
After his first steps in the chess club of Vitinia, where he was born, he was trained by the Cuban-Italian GM Lexy Ortega, who followed his career until the age of 16, when he became an International Master. In 2006, Vocaturo played with team Italy B at the 37th Chess Olympiad in Turin. His team won a gold medal in their rating category. In 2008, after completing his school studies, he decided to follow in the footsteps of Michele Godena, becoming a professional player. GM Mihail Marin became his new trainer, helping him on the road to achieving his Grandmaster title.

In October 2008, Vocaturo won the Open Rohde in Sautron, France, achieving his first norm required for the GM title. His second norm came at the Reykjavík Open in March 2009. In May, he secured his final norm at the international tournament "Capo d'Orso" in Palau, Sardinia. Thus he became the third chess player born in Italy to be awarded the title of grandmaster by FIDE, after Sergio Mariotti in 1974 and Michele Godena in 1996.

In January 2010, Vocaturo participated in the Group C of the Corus Chess Tournament in Wijk aan Zee, finishing third. In May, he played on board 3 with the Italian team at the Mitropa Cup in Chur, Switzerland. Italy won this competition for the first time. Vocaturo achieved a rating performance above 2700.

In January 2011 Vocaturo won the Group C event of the Tata Steel Chess Tournament scoring 9/13 points, ahead of Ukrainian rising star Illia Nyzhnyk. In the last round game, Nyzhnyk arrived at a potential winning position, but overlooked a combination by Vocaturo that allowed a perpetual check, the draw being sufficient for Vocaturo to maintain his half point lead.

Vocaturo played successfully in the Chess World Cup 2023. Despite being seeded 85th, he defeated 44th seed Andrei Volokitin in the second round, and then 21st seed Daniil Dubov in the third round, before being defeated by 53rd seed Salem Saleh in the fourth round.
