= Gábor Nagy (chess player) =

Hungarian chess grandmaster (born 1994)

Personal information
- Born: September 18, 1994 (age 31)

Chess career
- Country: Hungary
- Title: Grandmaster (2020)
- FIDE rating: 2428 (July 2026)
- Peak rating: 2535 (October 2021)

Gábor Nagy (born 18 September 1994) is a Hungarian chess player. He was awarded the Grandmaster title by FIDE in 2020.

== Career ==
Nagy won the Charlotte Chess Center Fall 2022 GM/IM Norm Invitational, finishing unbeaten on 8/9, two points clear of second-place Robby Adamson.

He qualified for the Chess World Cup 2023, where he was defeated by Alexandr Fier in the first round.

== Controversy ==
Nagy was one of the players highlighted in the controversy over Abhimanyu Mishra's early Grandmaster title. Nagy played Mishra in six tournaments in quick succession in Budapest, drawing with the young player after only 13 moves in one game, and after only six moves in another, both results that assisted Mishra in becoming the youngest player of all time to obtain the Grandmaster title.
