= Haruna Nsubuga =

Ugandan chess player (born 1991)

Personal information
- Born: December 24, 1991 (age 34) Kireka, Uganda

Chess career
- Country: Uganda
- Title: FIDE Master (2016)
- Peak rating: 2263 (June 2019)

Haruna Nsubuga is a Ugandan chess player.

== Chess career ==
Nsubuga began playing chess at age 14. He is coached by Elijah Emojong.

In 2011, he won the Junior Championship and the Uganda National Championship, being the only Ugandan player to accomplish this feat.

In February 2018, he participated in the St Louis Chess Open and won the adult category ahead of Michel Zialor, Sergey Prokopyev, and Timothy Kate. He later represented Uganda at the 2018 Chess Olympiad.

Nsubuga was able to play in the Chess World Cup 2023 after obtaining the additional funding he needed to fly to Azerbaijan. He was the second Ugandan after Arthur Ssegwanyi to participate in a Chess World Cup. He was aiming to be able to become an International Master by earning two more IM norms through participating in the event. At the event, he was defeated by Jules Moussard in the first round.
