= Leonel Figueredo Losada =

Mexican chess player (born 1988)

Personal information
- Born: 1988 (age 37–38)

Chess career
- Country: Cuba (until 2019); Mexico (since 2019)
- Title: International Master (2021)
- Peak rating: 2415 (April 2009)

Leonel Figueredo Losada (born 1988) is a Cuban-Mexican chess International Master.

== Chess career ==
In the early 2000s, Leonel Figueredo Losada was one of the most promising young Cuban chess players. He participated in international chess tournaments held in Cuba.

In August 2019 Leonel Figueredo Losada changed his chess federation to Mexico.

In 2022 Leonel Figueredo Losada ranked in 6th place in American Continental Chess Championship and after Cuban Grandmaster Yasser Quesada declined to play replacement his in the Chess World Cup.

In 2023, in Baku Leonel Figueredo Losada participated in single-elimination Chess World Cup and lost in 1st round to Azerbaijani Grandmaster Vasif Durarbayli.

In 2021, he was awarded the FIDE International Master (IM) title.
