= Pablo Ismael Acosta =

Argentine chess player (born 1999)

- Pablo Acosta at the World Cup Chess 2023

Personal information
- Born: 25 December 1999 (age 26) Salta, Argentina

Chess career
- Country: Argentina
- Title: International Master (2014)
- FIDE rating: 2452 (September 2026)
- Peak rating: 2506 (October 2025)

Pablo Ismael Acosta (born 25 December 1999) is an Argentine chess player who holds the title of International Master, which he earned in 2014 at the age of 14, becoming the youngest Argentine International Master.

== Chess career ==
Pablo Ismael Acosta won the Argentine Youth Championship Under 8 in 2006 and 2007, Under 10 in 2009, Under 14 in 2013 and under 18 in 2017. He also won the Argentine Under 20 Championship in 2016, 2017 and 2018.

Sub-Champion Argentine Superior Final 2018.

He won Pan American Youth Sub 10 Gold Medal (2009) obtains the title of Fide Master (MF).

He also won South American Youth Sub 18 Gold Medal (2014) obtains the title of International Master (IM) youngest in the history of Argentina.

Sub-Champion Zonal 2.5 Absolute 2023.

He qualified for the Chess World Cup 2023, causing an upset by defeating Kacper Piorun in the first round, before being eliminated by Bogdan-Daniel Deac in round two.

He is also a chess coach.
