= Ivan Schitco =

Moldovan chess grandmaster (born 2003)

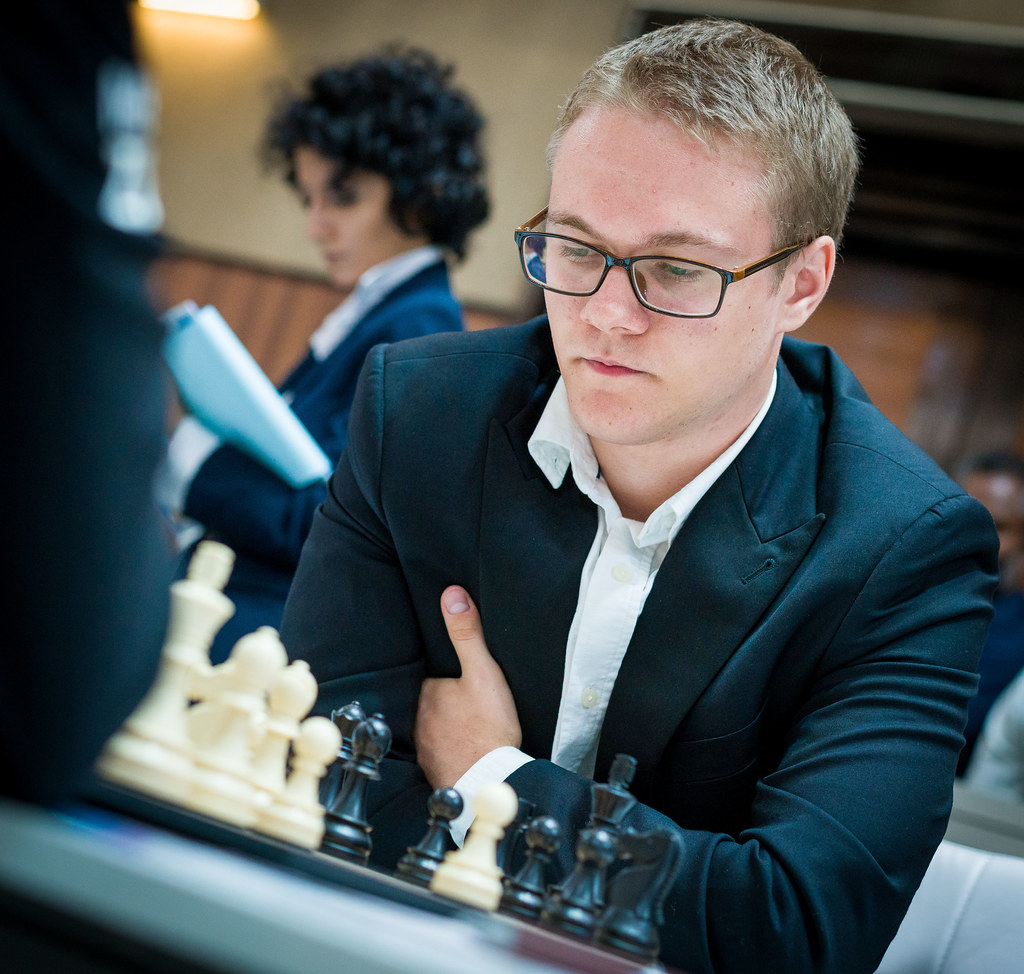
- Ivan Schitco in 2022

Personal information
- Born: 4 January 2003 (age 23) Chișinău, Moldova

Chess career
- Country: Moldova
- Title: Grandmaster (2022)
- FIDE rating: 2482 (July 2026)
- Peak rating: 2532 (November 2022)

Ivan Schitco (born 4 January 2003) is a Moldovan chess player who holds the title of Grandmaster (GM, 2022).

== Biography ==
Schitco is one of the best young Moldovan chess players. He participated in European Youth Chess Championships and World Youth Chess Championships.He trained with the international master Boris Itkis and regularly attended the sessions of the Chess Federation Performance Center under the guidance of the distinguished coach Grandmaster Dmitrii Svetuskin. He got the bronze in 2012 at the World School Chess Championship. In November 2017, he ranked first at the Botvinnic Cup International Tournament in Moscow (Russia), where the strongest juniors from 11 countries participated, including 8 chess players with international titles. In 2019 Ivan Schitco won European School Chess Championship in U17 age group.

Schitco played for Moldova in the Chess Olympiad:

- In 2022, at first board in the 44th Chess Olympiad in Chennai (+2, =7, -1). He was leading Moldova to a historical 6th place and drawing World Chess Champion Magnus Carlsen in the same tournament.

Schitco played for Moldova in the European Team Chess Championship:

- In 2019, at third board in the 22nd European Team Chess Championship in Batumi (+3, =1, -3).
- In 2022, Schitco drew Magnus Carlsen for a second time in Moldova's match against Norway.

In 2019, he was awarded the FIDE International Master (IM) title and received the FIDE Grandmaster (GM) title three years later.

Schitco qualified for the Chess World Cup 2023, where, ranked 150th, he defeated 107th-seed Nidjat Mamedov in the first round, and 22nd-seed Sam Shankland in the second round.

As of 2022, Schitco was a student and chess team member at University of Texas at Dallas.
