= Igor Janik (chess player) =

Polish chess grandmaster (born 2000)

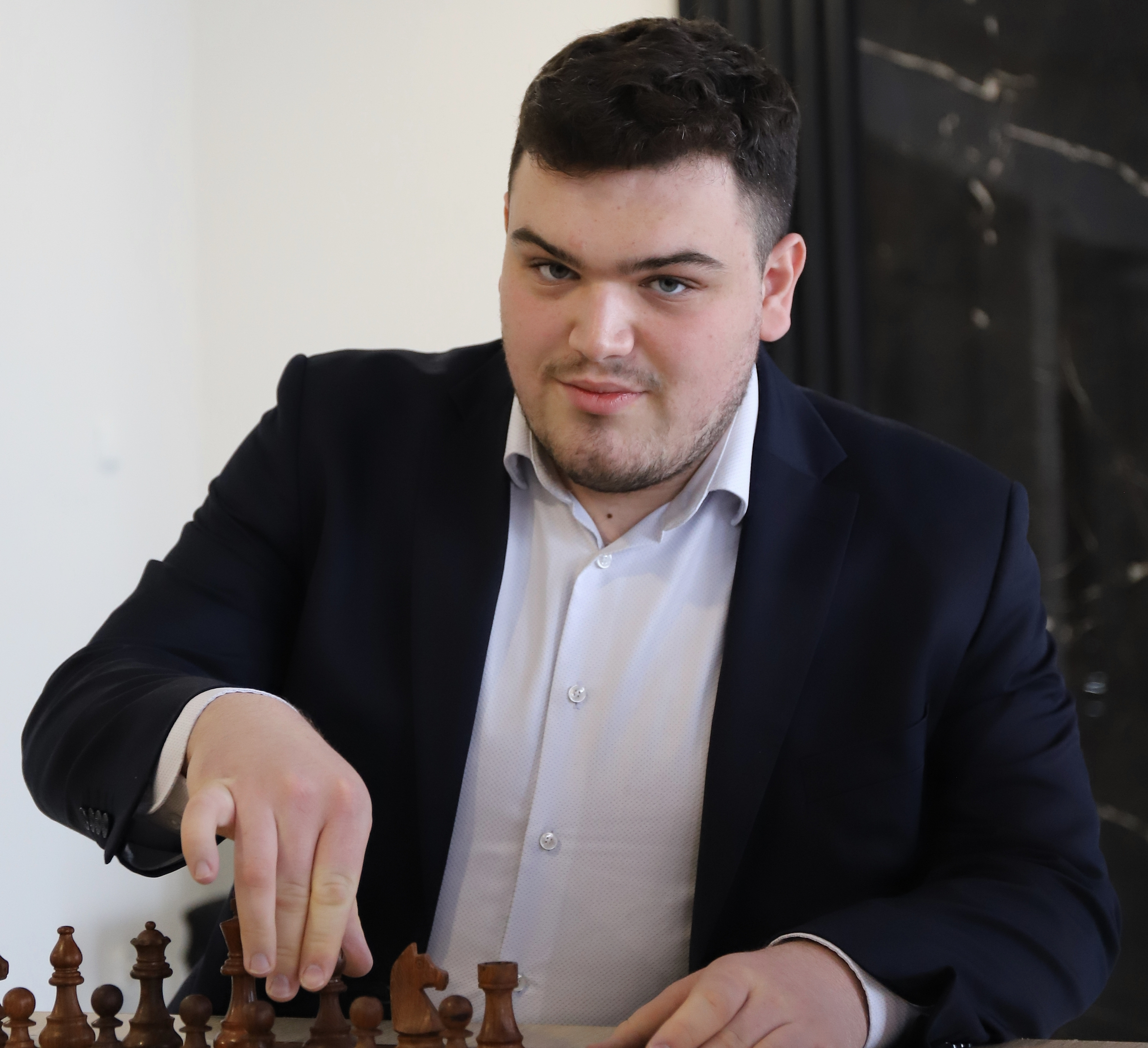
- Igor Janik in 2022

Personal information
- Born: 9 June 2000 (age 26) Elbląg, Poland

Chess career
- Country: Poland
- Title: Grandmaster (2022)
- FIDE rating: 2531 (August 2026)
- Peak rating: 2552 (April 2023)

Igor Janik (born 9 June 2000) is a Polish chess grandmaster.

== Biography ==
Igor Janik made his chess debut in the individual Polish Youth Chess Championship in 2010 in Wisła, where he took the 13th place. He won the Polish Youth Chess Championships medals six times: silver in Solina in 2012 (U12 age group), silver in Wałbrzych in 2013 (U14 age group), gold in Spała in 2014 (U14 age group), silver in Karpacz in 2015 (U16 age group), gold in Szklarska Poręba in 2016 (U16 age group) and gold in Ustroń in 2017 (U18 age group).

Igor Janik was a medalist of the European Youth Rapid Chess Championships: bronze (Tallinn in 2014 - U14 age group. He was also a five-time medalist of the Polish Rapid Chess Championships (including three times gold: Olsztyn 2013 - U14 age group, Katowice 2015 - U16 age group and Wrocław 2018 - U18 age group) and a five-time medalist of the Polish Youth Blitz Chess Championships (including four times gold: Katowice 2015 - U16 age group, Koszalin 2016 - U16 age group and Wrocław 2018 - U18 age group).

Igor Janik represented Poland at World Youth Chess Championships (7 times) and European Youth Chess Championships (5 times), achieving the best result in 2016 in Prague - 2nd place at the European Youth Chess Championship in U16 age group. He won tournaments four times: 2016 in Mariánské Lázně, 2017 in Jastrzębia Góra Star of the North, 2018 in Gorzów Wielkopolski (Emanuel Lasker Memorial) and 2019 in Budapest (Lengyel Béla Memorial).

Since 2019, Igor Janik has regularly participated in the finals of the Polish Chess Championships. He achieved the best result in 2019, when he ranked in 7th place. Also he won two silver medal in row in Polish Blitz Chess Championship (2019, 2020).

In 2018, Igor Janik was awarded the FIDE International Master (IM) title and received the FIDE Grandmaster (GM) title four years later. He reached the highest rating in his career so far on April 1, 2023, with a score of 2552 points.
