= Lance Henderson de La Fuente =

Andorran chess grandmaster (born 2003)

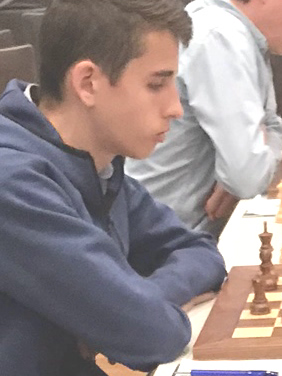
- Henderson de La Fuente in 2019

Personal information
- Born: May 19, 2003 (age 23) Marbella, Spain

Chess career
- Country: Spain (until 2021); Andorra (since 2021)
- Title: Grandmaster (2019)
- FIDE rating: 2510 (September 2026)
- Peak rating: 2525 (October 2024)

Lance Henderson de La Fuente (born May 19, 2003) is a Spanish chess grandmaster who now represents Andorra. He is Andorra's highest-rated chess player.

== Chess career ==
In October 2022, Henderson won the 4th ESNA European Small Nations Individual Chess Championship 2022 by defeating Luitjen Akselsson Apol in the final round.

In December 2022, Henderson tied for second place in the Chessable Sunway Sitges Blitz tournament.

Henderson participated in the Chess World Cup 2023, where he was defeated by Adhiban Baskaran in the first round.

== Personal life ==
Henderson's father Matt Henderson is an American IT entrepreneur and amateur chess player; his mother María del Pino de la Fuente is a Spanish aerospace engineer.

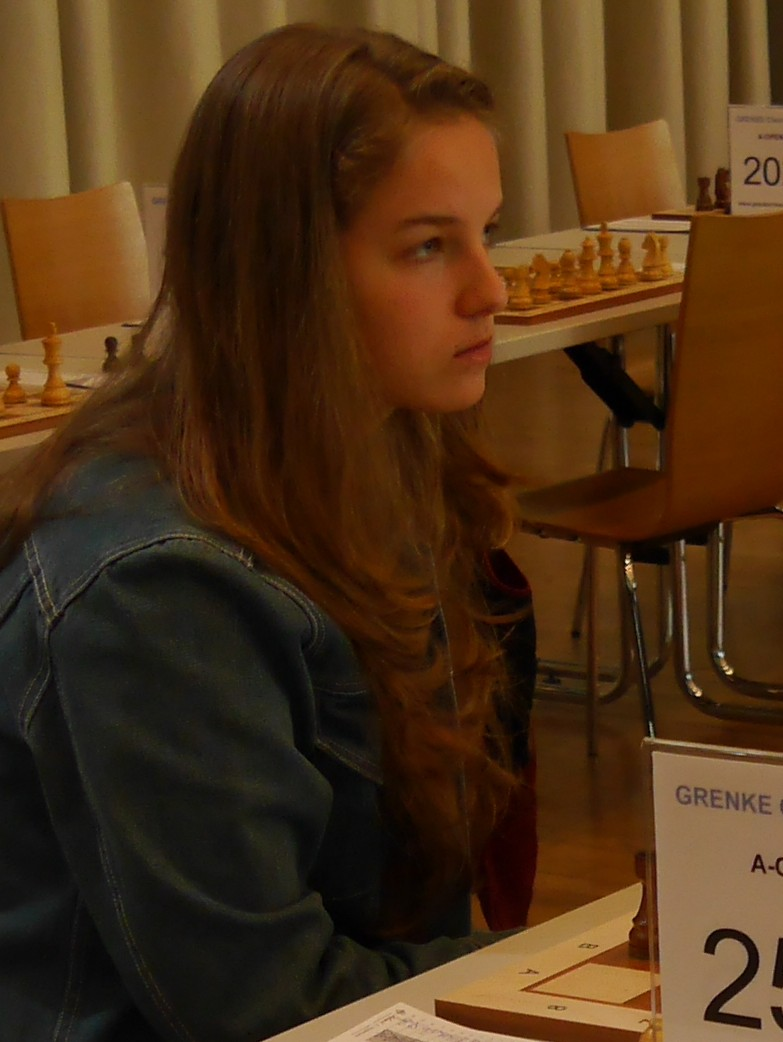
His sister, Andrea, in 2017

Henderson's sister Andrea is also a chess player, holding the title of WFM. As of 2026, she is studying for a doctorate in Astrophysics at Oxford University.

The family moved to Andorra in 2021; since then all three members with FIDE ratings have been listed as representing Andorra.
