= Grzegorz Nasuta =

Polish chess grandmaster (born 1996)

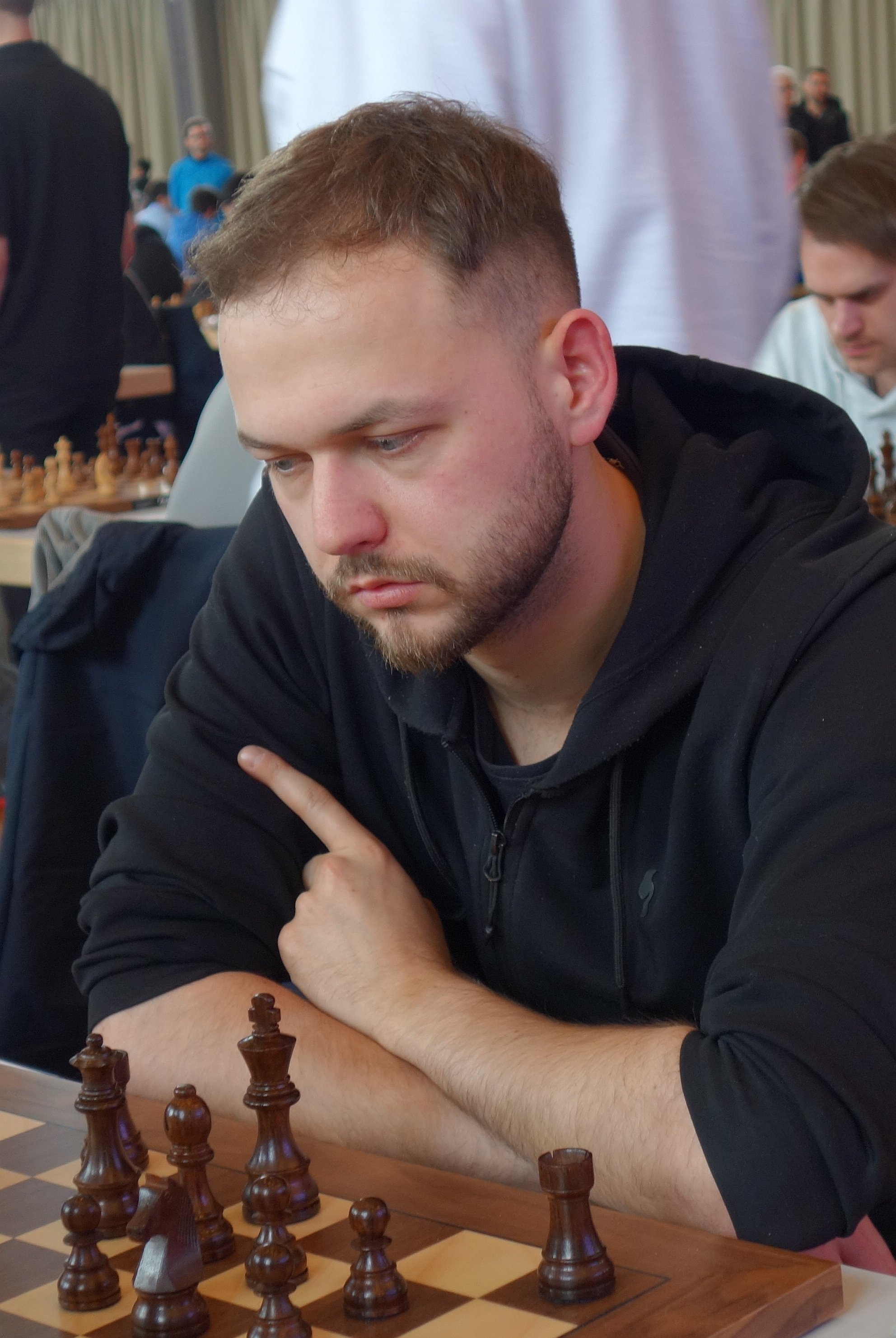
- Grzegorz Nasuta in 2024

Personal information
- Born: 1 March 1996 (age 30) Białystok, Poland

Chess career
- Country: Poland
- Title: Grandmaster (2018)
- FIDE rating: 2495 (July 2026)
- Peak rating: 2585 (October 2023)

Grzegorz Nasuta (born 1 March 1996) is a Polish chess grandmaster.

== Biography ==
Grzegorz Nasuta is a multiple finalist of individual Polish Youth Chess Championships in various age groups, five-time medalist of these competitions: gold (Jastrzębia Góra 2014 - U18), twice silver (Ustroń 2008 - U12, Szczyrk 2013 - U18) and twice bronze (Rybnik 2003 - U7, Sękocin Stary 2010 - U14).

Also, he is a seven-time medalist of the Polish Youth Rapid Chess Championships:

- 4 gold (Kołobrzeg 2003, Częstochowa 2006, Warszawa 2010, Warszawa 2012);
- 3 silver (Koszalin 2004, Lublin 2008, Wrocław 2014).

Grzegorz Nasuta is two-time medalist of the Polish Youth Blitz Chess Championships: silver (Warszawa 2012) and bronze (Warszawa 2010).

Grzegorz Nasuta represented Poland at European Youth Chess Championships in various age groups three times (2007, 2008, 2013), World Youth Chess Championships (U14 - 2010, U16 - 2012, U18 - 2014, 7th place), U20 World Junior Chess Championship (2016 - 8th place) and World Youth U16 Chess Olympiad (2012 - 9th place). Grzegorz Nasuta is individual and team academic chess vice-champion of the world (Brazil 2018). He is the winner of the Kętrzyn Chess Festival (Kętrzyn 2011) and the memorial Ludwik Zamenhof (Białystok 2012), winner of the 2nd place (behind Patryk Łagowski) in Międzyzdroje (2012). Grzegorz Nasuta is silver medalist of the European U18 Team Chess Championship in Iași in 2014. In 2014, he won Polish Junior Chess Team Championship representing the chess club MUKS "Stoczek 45" Białystok.

In 2015, Grzegorz Nasuta was awarded the FIDE International Master (IM) title and received the FIDE Grandmaster (GM) title three years later. He achieved the highest rating in his career so far on January 1, 2020. With a score of 2561 points, he was ranked 16th among Polish chess players.
