= Evandro Amorim Barbosa =

Brazilian chess grandmaster (born 1992)

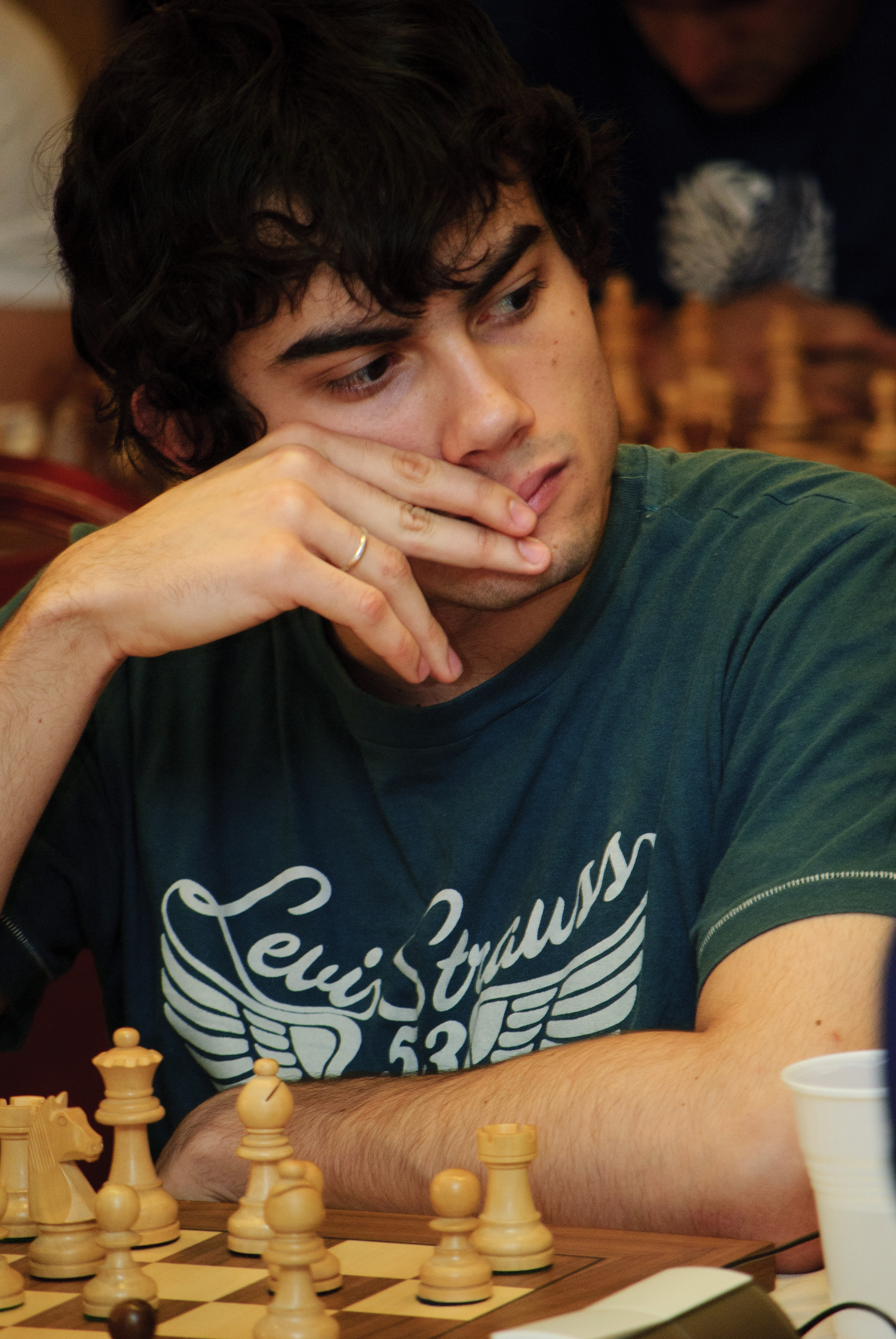
- Evandro Barbosa, Athens 2012

Personal information
- Born: August 24, 1992 (age 34) São Sebastião do Paraíso, Brazil

Chess career
- Country: Brazil
- Title: Grandmaster (2016)
- FIDE rating: 2483 (November 2026)
- Peak rating: 2523 (April 2018)

Evandro Amorim Barbosa (born August 24, 1992) is a Brazilian chess player. He became a FIDE Master in 2009 and International Master in 2011. He obtained the Grandmaster (GM) title in 2016. In 2016, he represented Brazil in 42nd Chess Olympiad held in Baku.

== Notable tournaments ==
Tournament Name	Year	ELO	Points
4th Circuito CBX Natal GM(Natal BRA)	2016	2461	7.0
79th ch-BRA 2013( Montenegro BRA)	2013	2422	8.0
