= Jerguš Pecháč =

Slovak chess grandmaster (born 2001)

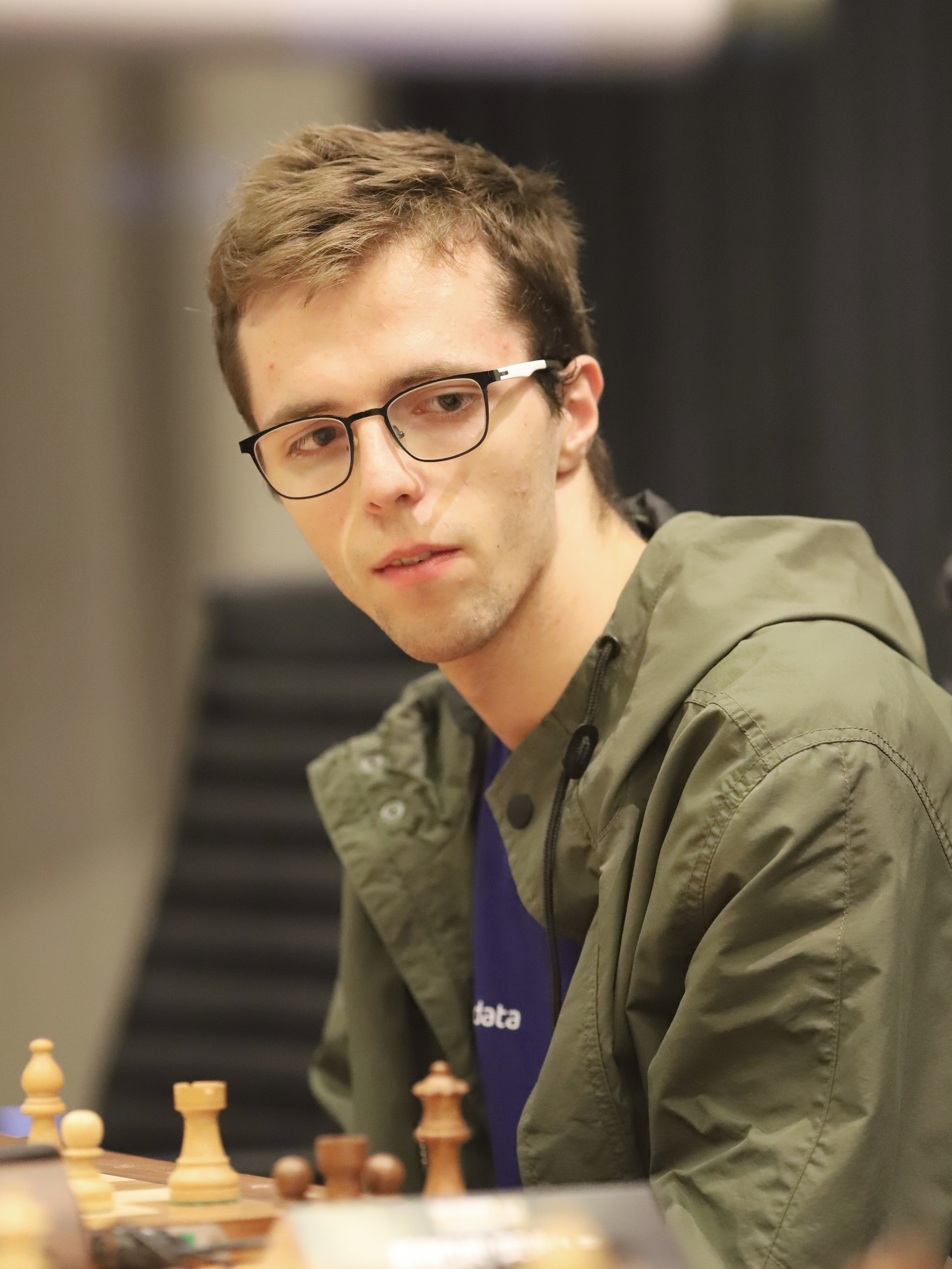
- Jerguš Pecháč in 2022

Personal information
- Born: 31 October 2001 (age 24) Žilina, Slovakia

Chess career
- Country: Slovakia
- Title: Grandmaster (2019)
- FIDE rating: 2539 (July 2026)
- Peak rating: 2637 (January 2023)

Jerguš Pecháč (born 31 October 2001) is a Slovak chess grandmaster.

== Chess career ==
He came third in the U-12 European Youth Chess Championship in Prague in 2012. He was awarded the title of International Master in 2017, and Grandmaster in 2019, becoming Slovakia's youngest grandmaster.

He was nominated by the FIDE president as a replacement in the Chess World Cup 2021, where he faced Alexandr Fier in the first round. Earlier, in an online World Cup qualifier, he gained attention by offering Boris Gelfand a draw after Gelfand had left his queen en prise following a mouseslip.
