= Emilio Córdova =

Peruvian chess grandmaster (born 1991)

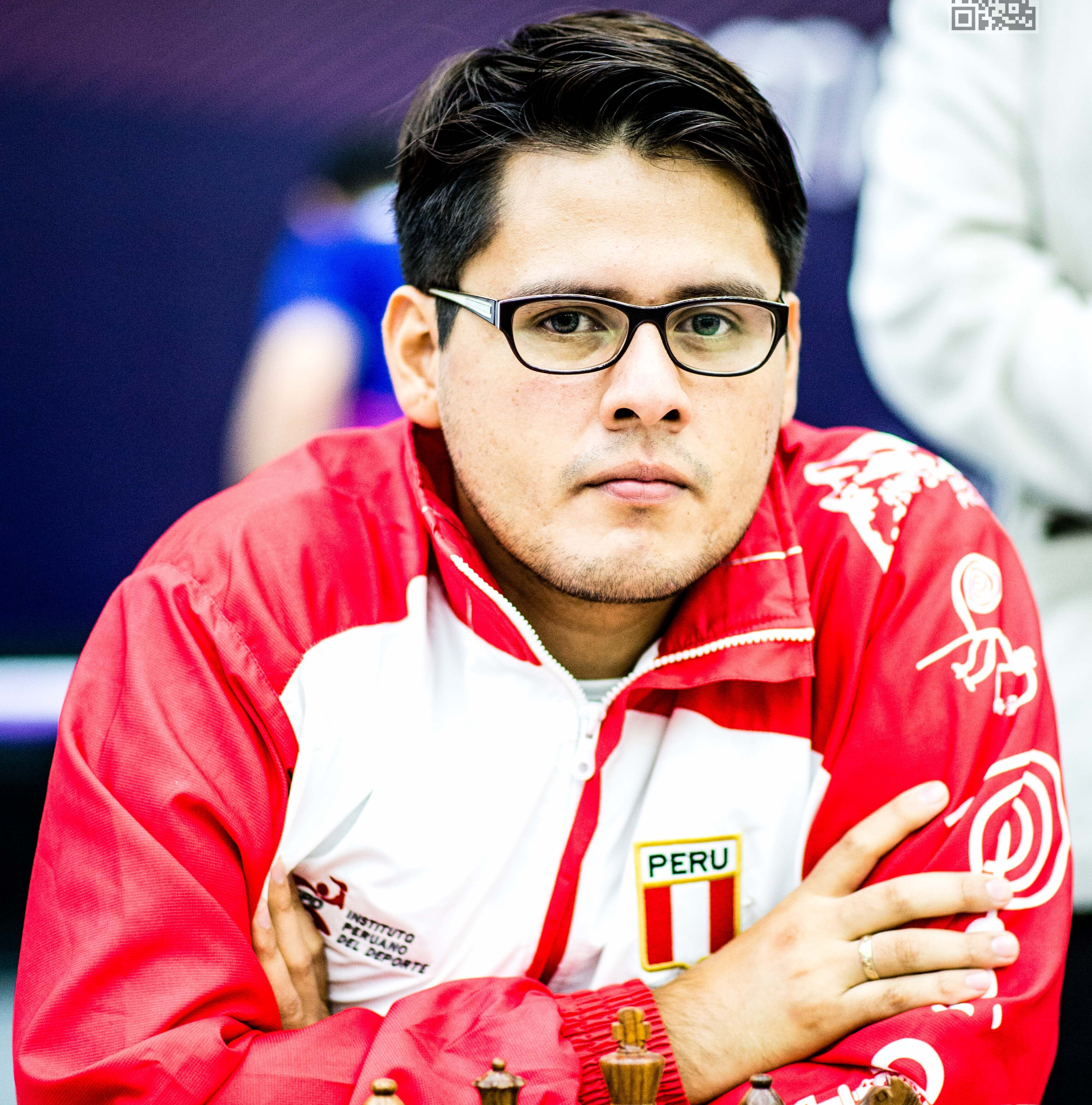

Personal information
- Born: July 8, 1991 (age 35) Lima, Peru

Chess career
- Country: Peru
- Title: Grandmaster (2008)
- FIDE rating: 2498 (July 2026)
- Peak rating: 2660 (December 2016)
- Peak ranking: No. 94 (December 2016)

Emilio Córdova Daza is a Peruvian chess player who holds the title of Grandmaster, which he was awarded in 2008.

Córdova has represented Peru in numerous Chess Olympiads, including 2004, 2006, 2010, 2014, 2016, 2018, and 2022.

Córdova qualified for the Chess World Cup 2017, where he was defeated by Richárd Rapport in the first round.

In August 2021, Córdova earned clear second place in the Charlotte Chess Center's Summer 2020 GM Norm Invitational held in Charlotte, North Carolina with an undefeated score of 6.0/9.

In November 2022, Córdova tied for 1st place at the 2022 U.S. Masters Chess Championship with a score of 7/9.
