= Maxime Lagarde =

French chess grandmaster (born 1994)

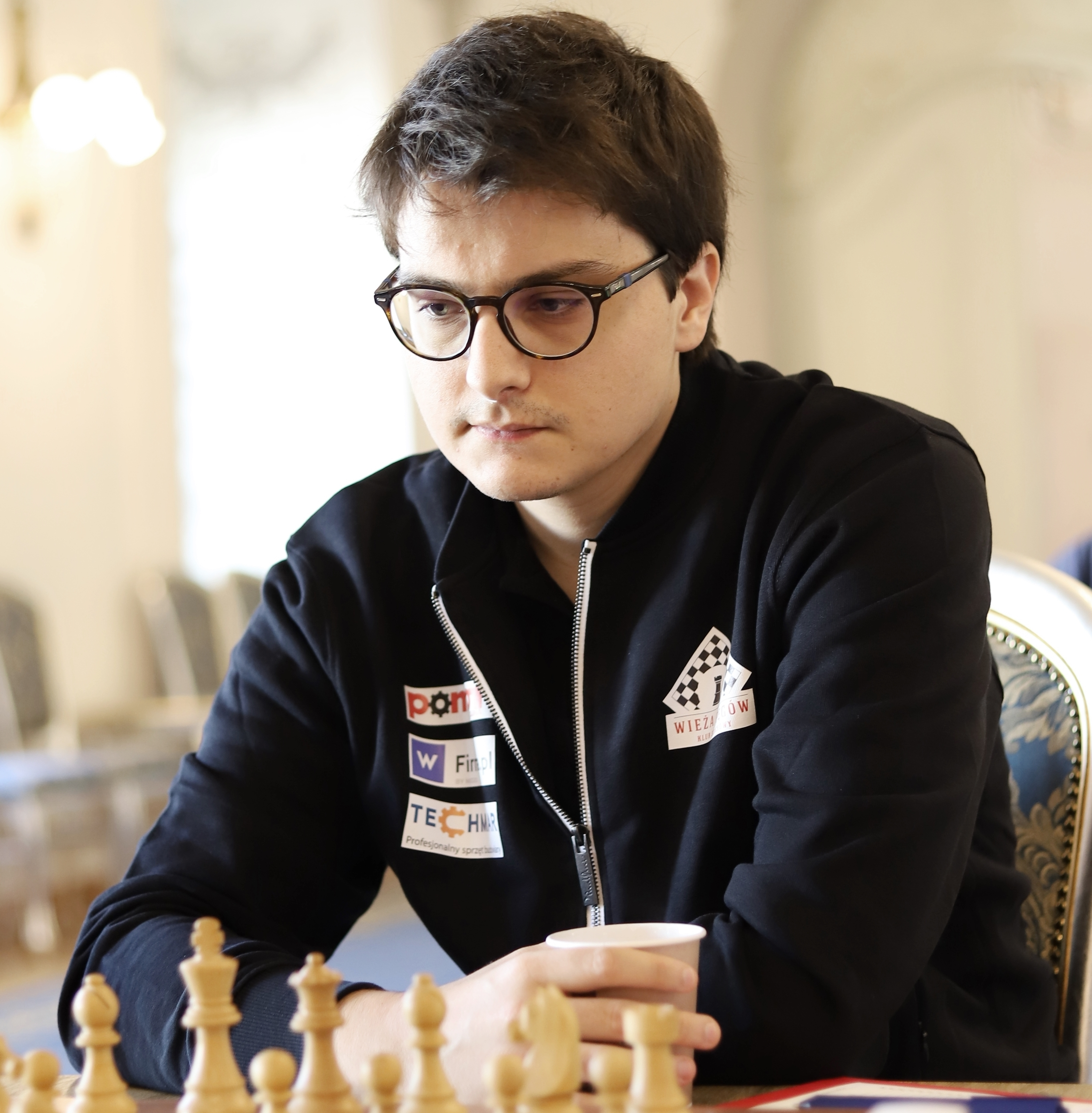
- Lagarde in 2021

Personal information
- Born: 16 March 1994 (age 32) Niort, Deux-Sèvres, France

Chess career
- Country: France
- Title: Grandmaster (2013)
- FIDE rating: 2622 (July 2026)
- Peak rating: 2659 (February 2020)
- Peak ranking: No. 82 (February 2020)

Maxime Lagarde (born 16 March 1994) is a French chess grandmaster. He won the French Chess Championship in 2019.

== Chess career ==
Born in 1994, Lagarde earned his international master title in 2011 and his grandmaster title in 2013.

Lagarde finished second at the 2018 Reykjavik Open, scoring 7/9 (+6–1=2). He won the French Chess Championship in 2019, placing joint-first with 6/9 (+4–1=4) and defeating Laurent Fressinet on tiebreak to take the title.

He won the 6th Purtichju Open in 2019.

In 2020, Lagarde won the 22nd Trieste Festival.

In 2025, Lagarde won the 1st rapid Caïssa tournament in Bordeaux.
