= Valentin Dragnev =

Austrian chess grandmaster (born 1999)

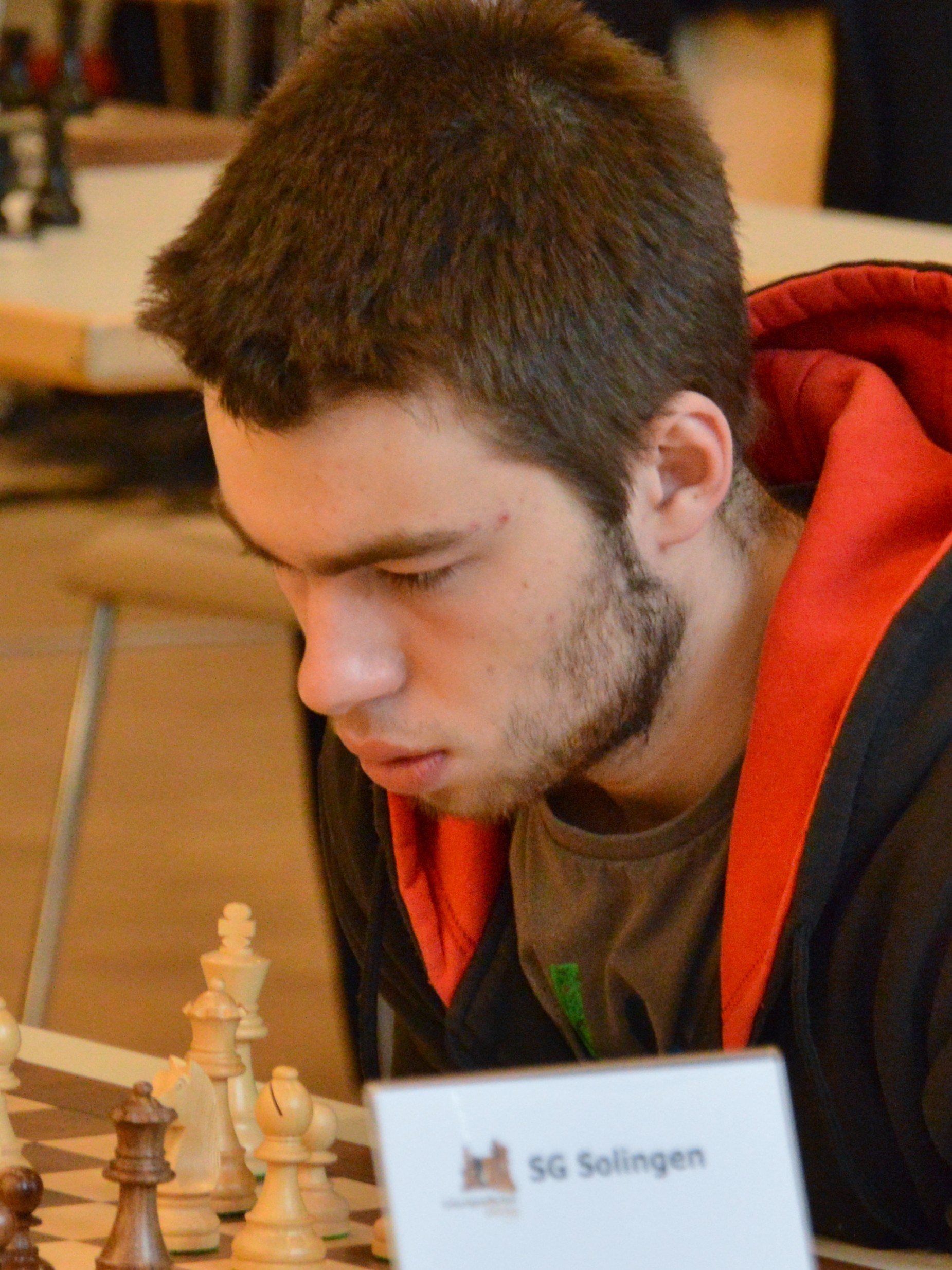
- Dragnev in 2016

Personal information
- Born: 5 March 1999 (age 27) Vienna, Austria

Chess career
- Country: Austria
- Title: Grandmaster (2018)
- FIDE rating: 2545 (November 2026)
- Peak rating: 2593 (May 2023)

Valentin Dragnev (born 5 March 1999) has been an Austrian grandmaster since 2018, an international master since 2016 and a FIDE master since 2014. He is currently the 5th best player in Austria and 468th in the world. His highest rating was 2593 (in May 2023). He was the Austrian chess champion in 2020 and got 2nd place in the Austrian championship in 2018. He participated in the 42nd and 43rd chess olympiads.
