= Jaime Santos Latasa =

Spanish chess grandmaster (born 1996)

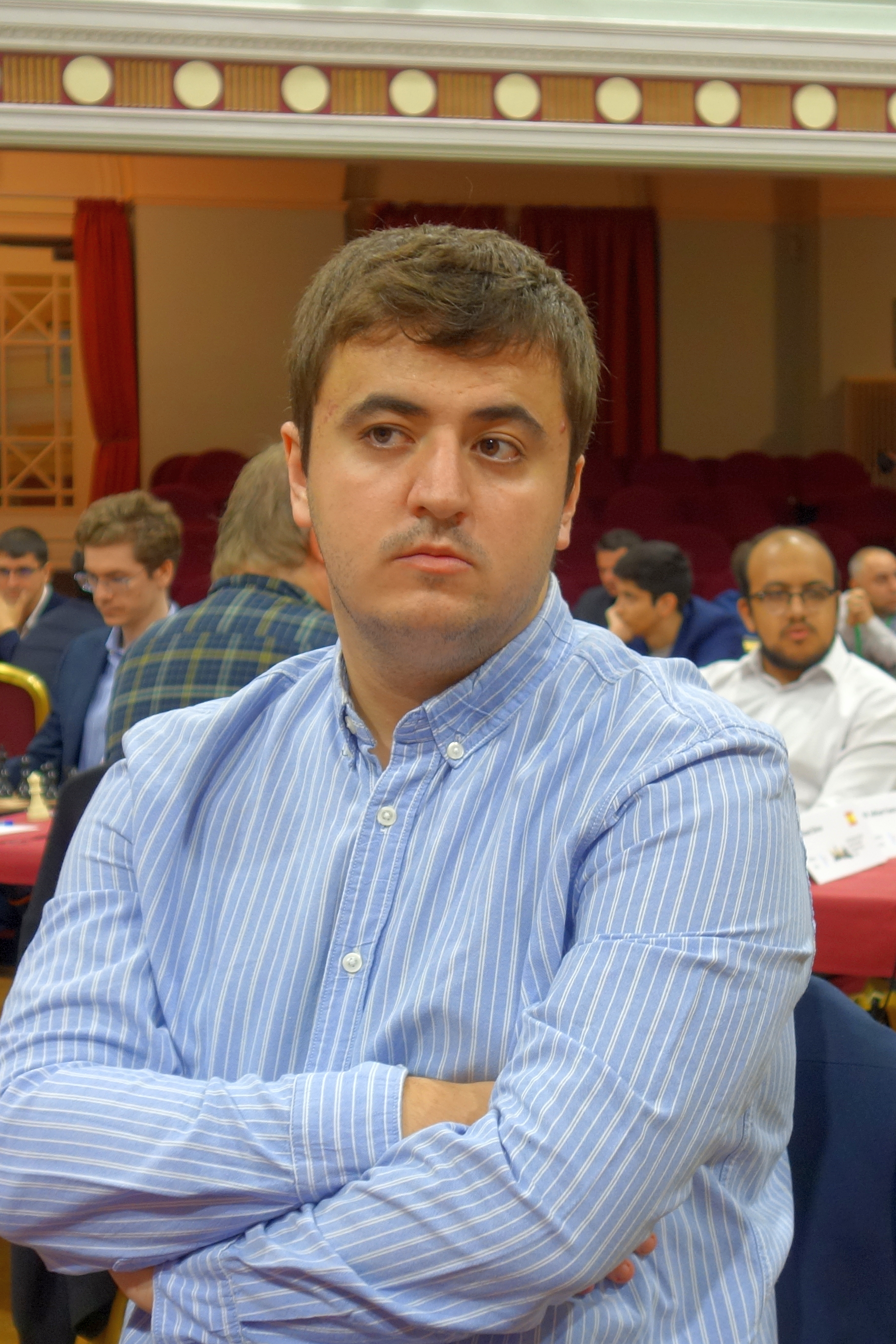
- Jaime Santos Latasa in 2023

Personal information
- Born: 3 July 1996 (age 30) San Sebastián, Spain

Chess career
- Country: Spain
- Title: Grandmaster (2018)
- FIDE rating: 2620 (July 2026)
- Peak rating: 2680 (September 2022)
- Peak ranking: No. 59 (September 2022)

Jaime Santos Latasa (born 3 July 1996) is a Spanish chess player. He was awarded the title of Grandmaster by FIDE in 2018.

== Chess career ==
Santos became a FIDE Master in 2011 and an International Master with effect from 15 August 2013. He was the Spanish U10 champion in 2006, the Spanish U12 champion in 2008 and the Spanish U14 champion in 2010. He was 19th in the San Sebastian Open 2009. He placed =3rd (4th on tiebreak) at the European U18 Junior Championship in 2014.

He led the Dubai Open Chess Tournament in 2017 with 5.5 points after 6 rounds, although finishing the tournament with a 20th place with 6.0/9.

On 18 December 2022 Santos won the 2022 European Championship in Rapid Chess with a score of 9.5 out of 11 points.

In July 2026, Santos won the Ciudad de Leon Masters after defeating Lê Quang Liêm 3½–½.

As of July 2026, Santos is the fourth highest-rated Spanish player.
