= Chess in South Africa =

There are records of organised chess being played in South Africa as far back as 1847, but the oldest surviving chess club is the Cape Town Chess Club, founded in 1885.

A national body, the Chess Federation of South Africa, was formed in 1948. Under apartheid, society was divided on racial grounds, and governed by whites, and the body catered for whites only. The first non-racial organisation, the Western Province Chess Association, was founded in 1964.

The following lists competitions for Chess in South Africa.

== Chess Olympiads ==
South Africa first participated in the 1958 Olympiad in Munich. In 1974, South Africa was suspended by FIDE due to the sports boycott as a result of the country's apartheid policies, returning to play at the 1992 Olympiad after the end of apartheid.

=== Open ===
Year	Event	Location	Players	Position	Ref
1958	13th Chess Olympiad	Munich, West Germany	Heidenfeld, Dreyer, Kirby, Grivainis, Isaacson, Stern	27/36	
1964	16th Chess Olympiad	Tel Aviv, Israel	Dreyer, Kirby, Rubinsztein, Friedgood, Wolpert, Isaacson	44/50	
1966	17th Chess Olympiad	Havana, Cuba	Dreyer, Kroon, Heyns, Hangelbroek, Price, Wilken	43/52	
1968	18th Chess Olympiad	Lugano, Switzerland	Friedgood, Kroon, Morschel, Griffiths, Hangelbroek	36/53	
1970	19th Chess Olympiad	Siegen, West Germany	Friedgood, Price, Heyns, Griffiths, Dreyer, Bloch	43/60	
1974	21st Chess Olympiad	Nice, France	Friedgood, Kroon, Korostenski, de Villiers, Bloch	DNF/63*	
1992	30th Chess Olympiad	Manila, Philippines	Solomons, de Villiers, D Gluckman, Kobese, Bouah, M Solomon	63/102	
1994	31st Chess Olympiad	Moscow, Russia	Solomons, Kobese, de Villiers, Bouah, M Solomon	58/124	
1996	32nd Chess Olympiad	Yerevan, Armenia	D Gluckman, Michelakis, Kobese, Levitt, Kromhout, Pearson	63/114	
1998	33rd Chess Olympiad	Elista, Russia	Kobese, Rubery, K Solomon, de Villiers, Cawdery	80/110	
2000	34th Chess Olympiad	Istanbul, Turkey	D Gluckman, K Solomon, van der Nat, Kromhout, M Solomon	68/129	
2002	35th Chess Olympiad	Bled, Slovenia	D Gluckman, K Solomon, J Gluckman, Levitt, Aranov, Kromhout	102/140	
2004	36th Chess Olympiad	Calvià, Spain	Michelakis, Kobese, K Solomon, D Gluckman, Solomons, J Gluckman	55/129	
2006	37th Chess Olympiad	Turin, Italy	Kobese, K Solomon, van der Nat, Cawdery, Ophoff, van den Heever	83/150	
2008	38th Chess Olympiad	Dresden, Germany	Kobese, K Solomon, Steel, Cawdery, Mabusela	58/154	
2010	39th Chess Olympiad	Khanty-Mansiysk, Russia	K Solomon, Kobese, Steel, Mabusela, van den Heever	74/149	
2012	40th Chess Olympiad	Istanbul, Turkey	K Solomon, Kobese, Steel, Mabusela, Cawdery	62/157	
2014	41st Chess Olympiad	Tromsø, Norway	K Solomon, Steel, Kobese, van den Heever, D Gluckman	82/177	
2016	42nd Chess Olympiad	Baku, Azerbaijan	K Solomon, Cawdery, Kobese, van den Heever, Klaasen	97/180	
2018	43rd Chess Olympiad	(Georgia (country)) Batumi, Georgia	Cawdery, Kobese, Klaasen, Mabusela, van den Heever	70/185	
2022	44th Chess Olympiad	Chennai, India	K Solomon, Cawdery, Barrish, Mhango, Kobese	55/188	
2024	45th Chess Olympiad	Budapest, Hungary	Barrish, Karsten, Levitan, Mhango, Cawdery	67/196	
2026	46th Chess Olympiad	Samarkand, Uzbekistan	Karsten, Levitan, Mhango, Mnyasta, Dinham	82/206	

- - In 1974, FIDE expelled the team with three rounds to go due to the country's apartheid policies.

=== Women ===
Year	Event	Location	Players	Position	Ref
1998	33rd Chess Olympiad	Elista, Russia	Erwee, Minnaar, Frank, Laubscher	62/72	
2000	34th Chess Olympiad	Istanbul, Turkey	Minnaar, Meyer, Frick, van der Merwe	71/86	
2002	35th Chess Olympiad	Bled, Slovenia	van der Merwe, Pretorius, Neethling, Bleazard	68/93	
2004	36th Chess Olympiad	Calvià, Spain	van der Merwe, Pretorius, Frick, Ellappen	68/87	
2006	37th Chess Olympiad	Turin, Italy	Frick, Ellappen, Moodliar, Laubscher	66/108	
2008	38th Chess Olympiad	Dresden, Germany	Solomons, Greeff, Ellappen, de Jager, Sischy	57/114	
2010	39th Chess Olympiad	Khanty-Mansiysk, Russia	Greeff, Solomons, Sischy, Ezeet, Mbalenhie	69/115	
2012	40th Chess Olympiad	Istanbul, Turkey	Greeff, van der Merwe, Solomons, Frick, Tlale	65/127	
2014	41st Chess Olympiad	Tromsø, Norway	Frick, Solomons, Tlale, R van Niekerk, Fisher	72/136	
2016	42nd Chess Olympiad	Baku, Azerbaijan	Frick, Laubscher, February, Fisher, L van Niekerk	72/140	
2018	43rd Chess Olympiad	(Georgia (country)) Batumi, Georgia	February, Bouah, Fisher, Selkirk, van Zyl	62/151	
2022	44th Chess Olympiad	Chennai, India	February, van Zyl, Badenhorst, Selkirk, Bouah	100/162	
2024	45th Chess Olympiad	Budapest, Hungary	February, Badenhorst, Klaasen, Nel, Strong	87/183	
2026	46th Chess Olympiad	Samarkand, Uzbekistan	Badenhorst, Laubscher, Nel, Klaasen, Masango	96/189	

== Major tournaments ==
Major tournaments hosted in South Africa include the South African Chess Championship and the South African Open.

In 2023, the first Cape Town Chess Masters was held.

== Top players ==
South Africa has one grandmaster; Kenny Solomon. Solomon earned the title by winning the African Chess Championship in December 2014. Solomon is however not the top-ranked player in the country.

Rank	Player	Rating	Year of birth
1	IM Henry Steel	2408	1989
2	IM Jan Karsten	2386	2008
3	FM Banele Mhango	2354	2003
4	IM Caleb Levitan	2316	2010
5	IM Daniel Cawdery	2312	1982
6	FM Raphael Felix	2307	2010
7	GM Kenny Solomon	2282	1979
8	FM Roland Bezuidenhout	2269	1997
9	FM Daniel Barrish	2245	2000
10	IM Watu Kobese	2224	1973

as of September 2026

=== Top female players ===
Rank	Player	Rating	Year of birth
1	WIM Jesse February	2010	1997
2	WFM Chloe Badenhorst	1997	2007
3	WIM Charlize Van Zyl	1963	1999
4	Sizakele Masango	1880	1997
5	WFM Chisomo Boshoma	1878	2007

as of September 2026
