= Chess at the 2007 All-Africa Games =

The chess events at the 2007 All-Africa Games were held from 12 to 21 July at the Cité des Sciences in Algiers. The four events were men's and women's team competitions at rapid time controls (all moves in 25 minutes plus 10 seconds increment per move), and men's and women's individual competitions at blitz time controls. Teams played matches on four boards: each team consisted of a minimum of four players and up to two optional reserve players. In the team competitions, medals were awarded to the teams scoring the highest number of board points, as well as to individual players with the best performances on each board in terms of win percentage.

Thirteen men's teams played a round-robin tournament held from 12 to 19 July. Egypt went undefeated through the tournament, conceding only one draw to Zambia, to win the team gold medal for the second time in a row, scoring 40 board points. South Africa scored 34½ board points, including 11 out of 12 in the final three rounds, to win the team silver medal. Zambia finished half a point behind and took bronze. Egypt's win qualified them to participate in the seventh World Team Chess Championship held in Bursa in 2010.

Six women's teams played a double round-robin held from 12 to 19 July. Although the tournament was much more competitive than the first edition held in Abuja in 2003, Algeria, South Africa and Nigeria replicated their podium finishes. South Africa led at the halfway point but lost 3–1 in the sixth round to host nation Algeria, who won the team gold medal with 28½ board points. South Africa recovered to beat Nigeria in the final round 2.5-1.5 to win the team silver medal with 26 board points. Nigeria finished half a point behind and settled for bronze.

The men's and women's individual blitz competitions took place on 20 and 21 July. Each country was allowed to enter a maximum of three players into each blitz tournament. Egypt's Ahmed Adly and Mona Khaled won the men's and women's tournaments respectively.

== Participating nations ==
- Algeria
- Angola
- Botswana
- Egypt
- Ethiopia
- Kenya
- Libya
- Mozambique
- Namibia
- Nigeria
- São Tomé and Príncipe
- South Africa
- Zambia
- Zimbabwe

== Medal summary ==
Event	Gold		Silver		Bronze	
Men's team – overall	Egypt (EGY); Essam El-Gindy; Bassem Amin; Ahmed Adly; Fouad El-Taher; Imed Abdelnabbi; Mohamed Ezat	40	South Africa (RSA); Watu Kobese; Kenny Solomon; Nicholas van der Nat; Donovan van den Heever; Henry Robert Steel	34½	Zambia (ZAM); Stanley Chumfwa; Nase Lungu; Daniel Jere; Chitumbo Mwali; Richmond Phiri	34
Men's team – Board 1	Essam El-Gindy; Egypt	94.4%	Robert Gwaze; Zimbabwe	75.0%	Watu Kobese; South Africa	68.2%
Men's team – Board 2	Bassem Amin; Egypt	93.8%	Saad Belouadah; Algeria	87.5%	Nase Lungu; Zambia	80.0%
Men's team – Board 3	Ahmed Adly; Egypt	85.7%	Odion Aikhoje; Nigeria	81.8%	Adérito Pedro; Angola	80.0%
Men's team – Board 4	Mohamed Haddouche; Algeria	93.8%	Chitumbo Mwali; Zambia	87.5%	Berhane Gebregziabher; Ethiopia	75.0%
Men's team – Board 5	Henry Robert Steel; South Africa	100%	Imed Abdelnabbi; Egypt	85.7%	Bunmi Olape; Nigeria	75.0%
Men's team – Board 6	Abobker El-Arbi; Libya	83.3%	Mohamed Ezat; Egypt	71.4%	Kolade Onabogun; Nigeria	66.7%
Women's team – overall	Algeria (ALG); Hayat Toubal; Amina Mezioud; Sabrina Latreche; Hafida Ali Ahmed; Amira Hamza	28½	South Africa (RSA); Jenine Ellappen; Denise Frick; Melissa Greeff; Anzel Solomons; Suvania Moodliar	26	Nigeria (NGR); Olufunmilayo Oyegunle; Doris Omoragbon; Oluwatobiloba Olatunji; Pauline Ikpa-Glewis; Rosemary Amadasun; Omolola Oluwatosin Alabi	25½
Women's team – Board 1	Yosra Alaa El Din; Egypt	71.4%	Hayat Toubal; Algeria	70.0%	Jenine Ellappen; South Africa	65.0%
Women's team – Board 2	Amina Mezioud; Algeria	90.0%	Denise Frick; South Africa	75.0%	Tshepiso Lopang; Botswana	27.8%
Women's team – Board 3	Oluwatobiloba Olatunji; Nigeria	94.4%	Melissa Greeff; South Africa	66.7%	Faridah Basta Sohair; Nigeria	55.6%
Women's team – Board 4	Pauline Ikpa-Glewis; Nigeria	80.0%	Anzel Solomons; South Africa	71.4%	Hafida Ali Ahmed; Algeria	66.7%
Women's team – Board 5	Mona Khaled; Egypt	85.7%	Amira Hamza; Algeria	72.2%	Rosemary Amadasun; Nigeria	66.7%
Women's team – Board 6	Omolola Oluwatosin Alabi; Nigeria	71.4%	Maha Mahmoud; Egypt	10.0%	Wafa Ali Belkacem; Libya	0%
Men's individual	Ahmed Adly; Egypt	N/A	Bassem Amin; Egypt	N/A	Watu Kobese; South Africa	N/A
Women's individual	Mona Khaled; Egypt	N/A	Jenine Ellappen; South Africa	N/A	Hayat Toubal; Algeria	N/A

== Medal table ==
* Host nation (Algeria)

Rank	Nation	Gold	Silver	Bronze	Total
1	Egypt (EGY)	8	4	0	12
2	Algeria (ALG)*	3	3	2	8
3	Nigeria (NGR)	3	1	5	9
4	South Africa (RSA)	1	6	3	10
5	Libya (LBA)	1	0	1	2
6	Zambia (ZAM)	0	1	2	3
7	Zimbabwe (ZIM)	0	1	0	1
8	Angola (ANG)	0	0	1	1
8	Botswana (BOT)	0	0	1	1
8	Ethiopia (ETH)	0	0	1	1
Totals (10 entries)		16	16	16	48
