= 1987 in chess =

Events in chess in 1987.

== Events ==
- 7 October – 19 December. World champion Garry Kasparov defends his title against challenger Anatoly Karpov in the 1987 World Championship in Seville. Kasparov was down 11–12 but won the 24th and final game of the match to tie and retain the title.
- The inaugural Australasian Masters chess tournament is won by Grandmaster Darryl Johansen in 1987. This annual invitational event has been Australia's only round robin grandmaster event since 2013.

== Births ==
- Ahmed Adly
- K. Jennitha Anto
- Dagur Arngrímsson
- Csaba Balogh
- Oluwafemi Balogun
- Tsegmediin Batchuluun
- Nino Batsiashvili
- Diego Di Berardino
- Daan Brandenburg
- Krzysztof Bulski
- J. Deepan Chakkravarthy
- Stanislav Cifka
- Karina Cyfka
- Anton Demchenko
- Nana Dzagnidze
- Viktor Erdős
- Maria Fominykh
- Leonid Gerzhoy
- Jessie Gilbert
- Olga Gutmakher
- Borislav Ivanov
- Fidel Corrales Jimenez
- Gawain Jones
- Eesha Karavade
- Muhammad Khusenkhojaev
- Erik Kislik
- Calvin Klaasen
- Humpy Koneru
- Baira Kovanova
- Martin Krämer
- Yerisbel Miranda Llanes
- Ruan Lufei
- Igor Lysyj
- Rodwell Makoto
- Karmen Mar
- Sandro Mareco
- Susanto Megaranto
- Georg Meier
- Salome Melia
- Luciana Morales Mendoza
- Cecile van der Merwe
- Batkhuyagiin Möngöntuul
- Hikaru Nakamura
- Phạm Lê Thảo Nguyên
- Arman Pashikian
- Sergey Pavlov
- Borki Predojević
- Antonio Radić
- Teimour Radjabov
- Vesna Rožič
- Anna Rudolf
- Veronika Schneider
- Samy Shoker
- Daniël Stellwagen
- Anđelija Stojanović
- Evgeny Tomashevsky
- Zehra Topel
- Hoàng Thị Bảo Trâm
- Sabrina Vega
- Ermes Espinosa Veloz
- Iva Videnova
- Nikita Vitiugov
- Radosław Wojtaszek
- Wang Yue
- Jolanta Zawadzka

== Deaths ==
- Vladimir Alatortsev (14 May 1909 – 13 January 1987), Russian Grandmaster and chairman of the USSR Chess Federation from 1959 to 1961.
- Yakov Estrin (21 April 1923 – 2 February 1987), Russian International Master, International Correspondence Chess Grandmaster and International Correspondence Chess Federation World Champion, 1972–1976.
- Narelle Kellner (18 October 1934 – 20 December 1987), Australian Woman International Master and two-time Australian Women's Champion (1972 and 1974).
- Józsa Lángos (28 August 1911 – 17 May 1987), Hungarian Woman International Master and eight-time winner of the Hungarian Women's Chess Championship (1942, 1943, 1944, 1947, 1949, 1950, 1951, 1952).
- Zsuzsa Makai (3 September 1945 – 12 May 1987), Hungarian and Romanian Woman International Master, two-time Olympian (1969 and 1978) and Hungarian Women's Champion (1980).
- Stepan Popel (15 August 1909 – 27 December 1987), Ukrainian and American chess player.
- Ignatz von Popiel (27 July 1863 – 2 May 1941), Polish-Ukrainian chess player.
- Salme Rootare (26 March 1913 – 21 October 1987), Estonian Woman International Master and fifteen-time Estonian Women's Champion (1945, 1948, 1949, 1950, 1954, 1956, 1957, 1960, 1962, 1964, 1966, 1969, 1970, 1971, and 1972).
- Boris Rõtov (20 August 1937 – 10 September 1987), Russian-Estonian chess player and 1978 Estonian Champion.
- George Wheatcroft (29 October 1905 – 2 December 1987), English chess player, winner of the 1935 British Correspondence Chess Championship and President of the British Chess Federation from 1953 to 1956.
- Mikhail Yudovich (8 June 1911 – 19 September 1987), Russian International Master, Grandmaster of Correspondence Chess, and chess writer.
