= Banele Mhango =

South African chess player (born 2003)

Personal information
- Born: Banele Fortune Mhango; 3 May 2003 (age 23) Mpumalanga, South Africa

Chess career
- Country: South Africa
- Title: FIDE Master (2020)
- Years active: 2017–present
- FIDE rating: 2354 (August 2026)
- Peak rating: 2354 (August 2026)
Medal record
South African Chess Championship
South African Junior Closed Championship
Gold medal – first place	U16 South African Junior Closed Championship	2017
African Chess Championship
African Youth Chess Championship
Bronze medal – third place	U16 African Youth Chess Championship	2018

Banele Fortune Mhango (born 3 May 2003) is a chess player and coach from South Africa. Mhango was awarded the FIDE title of FIDE Master in 2020 (and Candidate Master in 2018). He was named sportsman of the year after representing South Africa in competitions in Egypt and Kenya.

== Early life and career ==
Born on 3 May 2003 in Mpumalanga, South Africa, Banele Fortune Mhango is a South African chess player also known by his online screen name, Banelevich.

In 2017, he won the under 16 open category at The South African Junior Closed Championship. In 2018, Mhango competed in Kenya where he placed third, won bronze medal and earned the Candidate Master title. Following the victory in Kenya, he went on to compete in Egypt where he was awarded the FIDE Master title in 2020, and earned his spot to compete in Greece. However due to financial difficulties he was wasn't able to make it. He was named sportsman of the year after representing the South Africa in competitions in Egypt and Kenya. In 2022 he competed in the World Team Chess Championship where he was partnered with the likes of Grandmaster Kenny Solomon and International Master Daniel Cawdery going against Grandmasters Anish Giri, Maxime Vachier-Lagrave, Nihal Sarin and Hans Niemann.

Mhango has represented South Africa in three Chess Olympiads, 2022 on board four, where he finished with 5/9, 2024 on board three(4/8), and 2026 on board three (4/9).

== See also ==
- Chess in South Africa
