= Daniel Jere =

Zambian chess player (born 1986)

Personal information
- Born: September 14, 1986 (age 39)

Chess career
- Country: Zambia
- Title: International Master (2012)
- FIDE rating: 2366 (December 2021)
- Peak rating: 2418 (June 2013)

Daniel Jere is a Zambian chess player.

== Chess career ==
Jere is a three-time Zambian Chess Champion, winning the title in 2004, 2011, and 2012.

From 2006 to 2014, Jere played for Zambia at the 37th, 38th, 39th, 40th, and 41st Chess Olympiads.

Jere has played for the Zambian national men's chess team in the African Games. In 2007, he won a bronze medal in the men's team overall results in the Zambian team, which included Stanley Chumfwa, Nase Lungu, Chitumbo Mwali, and Richmond Phiri. In 2011, he won a silver medal in the men's team board performances and a bronze medal in the men's individual event.

In April 2013, he participated in the 2013 Cuca International tournament, where he finished 8th in a field of 16 players. He was the only male Zambian player in the event.

In 2016, Jere won the Championship Section of the Redpath Mining Millionaire Chess Open.

In 2017, he participated in the Zone 4.3 Individual Chess Championship, where he was defeated by eventual winner Kenny Solomon.
