= Chess South Africa =

Governing body for chess in South Africa

- Sport: Chess
- Jurisdiction: South Africa
- Abbreviation: CHESS SA
- Founded: 1996
- Affiliation: FIDE
- Location: South Africa
- President: Andre Lewaks
- Sponsor: SASCOC

Official website
- chessa.co.za
- (South Africa)

Chess South Africa (CHESS SA, previously CHESSA) is the national governing body for the sport of chess in South Africa. Chess South Africa is affiliated to the World Chess Federation (FIDE), and to the African Chess Confederation (ACC). Chess South Africa administers the official national chess rating system based on the elo rating system and grants national titles to players that distinguish their ability. CHESS SA is affiliated with SASCOC, and organises national competitions such as the South African Closed Chess Championship and the South African Open Chess Championship. CHESS SA was established in 1996 following unification discussions among several chess ruling bodies in existence during the apartheid era.

South Africa produced its first chess grandmaster in 2015 through Kenny Solomon. Kenny Solomon did not attain the required rating of 2500, but he earned the accolade by winning the African Chess Championship in December 2014.

== See also ==
- Chess in South Africa
- List of chess federations
