= Bruno Edgar Siegheim =

German–South African chess player

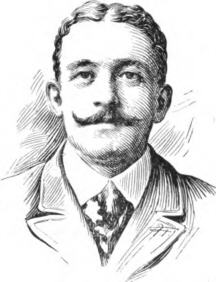
Bruno Edgar Siegheim

Bruno Edgar Siegheim (24 May 1875 in Berlin, Germany – 5 November 1952 in Johannesburg, South Africa) was a German–South African chess master.

He took 3rd, behind Julius Finn and Hermann Keidanski, at New York 1903 (The Rice Gambit tournament at the Manhattan Chess Club). Then, he twice won South African Chess Championship (1906 and 1912), and lost to Max Blieden in a challenge (1910), defeated Harry Duhan in a challenge (1911), and defeated Henk Meihuizen in a challenge (1912).

After World War I, he tied for 5-6th at Malvern 1921 (Frederick Yates won), and shared 2nd with Richard Réti, behind Akiba Rubinstein, at Hastings International Chess Congress in 1922/23. He also played a match with Mir Sultan Khan at London 1929.
