= Caleb Levitan =

South African chess player (born 2010)

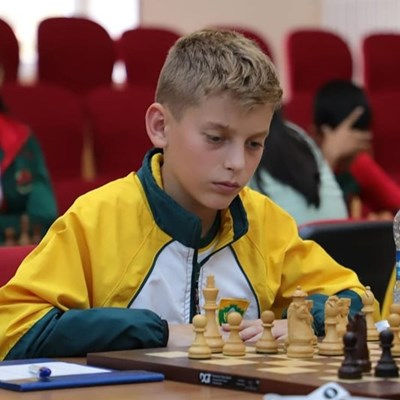
- Caleb Levitan representing South Africa at the FIDE World Youth U-16 Chess Olympiad in Azerbaijan

Personal information
- Born: 15 June 2010 (age 16) Johannesburg, South Africa

Chess career
- Country: South Africa
- Title: International Master (2025)
- Peak rating: 2399 (June 2025)

Caleb Levi Levitan (born 15 June 2010) is a South African chess player who holds the title of International Master. He is one of South Africa's highest rated chess players. In December 2024, he was South Africa's highest rated active player using the Chess South Africa rating system. At 14 years and 7 months, this made him the youngest South African chess player to achieve this distinction. At 14 years old, Caleb became the youngest South African to achieve a FIDE Elo of 2400 (and earn his International Master Title in the Process).

== Chess career ==
In 2018, Levitan won the Under 8 South African Junior Closed Chess Championships. That year he won the Under 8 African Youth Chess Championships in Kisumu, Kenya earning him a provisional Candidate Master Title. Levitan received the Candidate Master title in 2022 when his FIDE Elo crossed 2000 (the first South African to receive the Candidate Master title by meeting the minimum rating requirement).

In 2019, Levitan won the Under 10 South African Junior Closed Chess Championships.

In 2020, Levitan made it to the final 16 of the Fide Online World Cadets and Youth Rapid Chess Championships in the Under 10 Open Category. He lost to Ryo Chen from the USA.

In 2022, Levitan won the Under 16 South African Junior Closed Chess Championships at 11 years old. That year he finished second in the Under 16 section of the African Youth Chess Championships held in Lusaka, Zambia. He earned the provisional FIDE Master Title by placing tie first on points. The FIDE Master title was awarded in 2023 when his FIDE Elo rating crossed 2100. Levitan became South Africa's youngest Fide Master to obtain the title by meeting the minimum rating requirement.

Levitan played board 1 for South Africa at the FIDE World Youth U-16 Chess Olympiad hosted in Nakhchivan, Azerbaijan in 2022.

In 2023, Levitan received the Amayanga-Yanga Athlete of the Year award from Gauteng Sports. This award is a recognition given to young athletes who have demonstrated exceptional performance in their respective sports and shown great potential for the future.

In 2024, Levitan was selected with Banele Mhango to represent South Africa in chess at the 13th African Games taking place in Accra, Ghana.

In 2024, Levitan became the youngest person to be invited to compete at the South African Closed Chess Championships (at 13 years old). He finished second in the competition. In September 2024, Levitan became the youngest person (at 14 years old) to represent South Africa at a Chess Olympiad when he played Board 3 in the Open Section of the 45th Chess Olympiad which took place in Budapest, Hungary.

Levitan also represented South Africa in the 2026 Olympiad on board two, finishing on 5.5/9.

In 2025, Levitan became an International Master. He achieved three International Master norms and his live FIDE rating crossed 2400. He is the youngest South African to achieve the International Master title by meeting the traditional rating and norm requirements.
