= A Great Day =

A Great Day may refer to:

- A Great Day (film), a 2015 Nigerian short film written, produced, and directed by James Abinibi
- "A Great Day" (Beavis and Butt-head episode), an episode of the American animated television series Beavis and Butt-head
- "A Great Day" (Code Lyoko episode), "Un grand jour", 30th episode of the French animated television series Code Lyoko

== See also ==
- Great Day (disambiguation)
