= Sahaj =

Sahaj (सहज; Sanskrit: सहज) is a Hindi and Sanskrit word generally meaning natural, effortless, simple, or calm in nature. The term is derived from Sanskrit and is often associated with a state of being at ease, composed, and free from unnecessary agitation.

Sahaj may refer to:

- Sahaj Grover, Indian chess player
- Sahaj (musician), American musician

== See also ==
- Sahaja, an Indian religious-philosophical concept.
