= Gillan Bwalya =

Zambian chess player (born 1988)

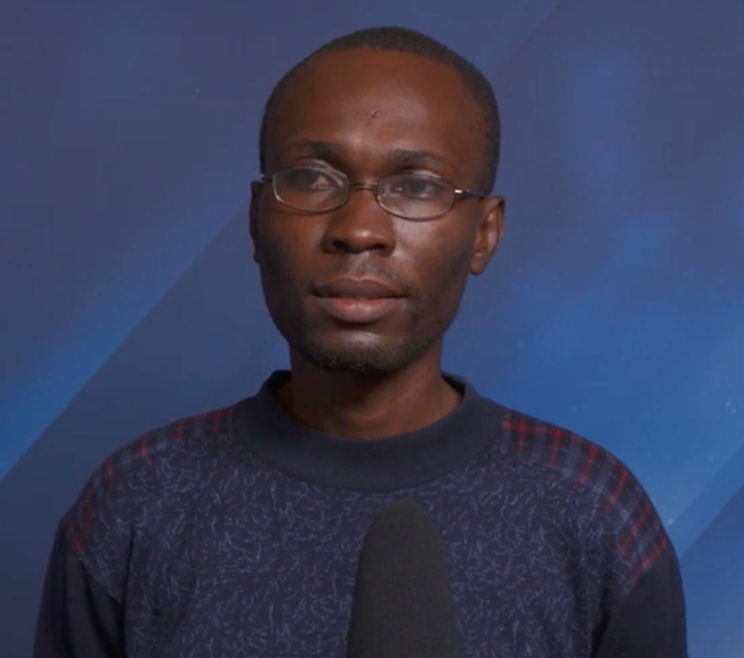
- Bwalya in 2022

Personal information
- Born: March 29, 1988 (age 38)

Chess career
- Country: Zambia
- Title: International Master (2014)
- Peak rating: 2411 (September 2022)

Gillan Bwalya is a Zambian chess player and International Master. He won the Zambian Chess Championship in 2010 and 2013.

Bwalya scored an impressive 7/9 at the 2012 Chess Olympiad, and followed this up by winning the 4.3 Zonal with 8/9, earning him the International Master title and the right to play in the Chess World Cup 2013. He became the third Zambian to qualify for the World Cup after GM Amon Simutowe and IM Stanley Chumfwa, losing to eventual winner Vladimir Kramnik in the first round.
