= Ednasia Junior =

Angolan chess player (born 2002)

Personal information
- Born: 2002 (age 23–24)

Chess career
- Country: Angola
- Title: Woman FIDE Master (2017)
- Peak rating: 1941 (June 2026)

Ednasia Junior is an Angolan chess player and Women's FIDE Master. The first Angolan woman to win an international chess award, she is ranked third among Angolan female players as of 1 July 2024, with an Elo rating of 1,888 points.

== Biography ==
In 2017, she won the African Schools Chess Cup with a perfect score. She comes from the chess group of the C.D. Primeiro de Agosto, like Luzia Pires.

In 2018 and 2021, she won the Angolan Women's Chess Cup. In 2022, she secured second place in the same competition, behind Esperança Caxita and ahead of Jemima Paulo. The following year, she won the same competition again.

In 2024, the athlete achieved second place in the African Women's Rapid Chess Championship after successfully halting the progress of Kenyan player Sasha Mongeli. This silver medal is the second most significant award won by the Angolan sports delegation at the African Games that year.

She appears in the media to represent her discipline in Angola, advocating for more resources for chess in the country and stating that it is currently impossible to pursue it as a full-time profession.
