= African Junior Chess Championship =

Chess championship for players under 20 years old in Africa

The African Junior Chess Championship is an annual chess tournament open to players in Africa who are under 20 years of age. The tournament was first held in 1980, and since its second edition in 1989, has been held annually with the exception of 2010. Beginning in 2002, a separate championship for girls has been held concurrently with the open championship.

== Competition ==
The championships are organized by national federations affiliated with the African Chess Confederation. They are open to chess players who are under 20 years of age as of 1 January of the year in which the championship is held. The championships are organized as a round-robin or a Swiss-system tournament depending on the number of participants. Since 2001, the open championship has been a nine-round Swiss.

The winners of the open and girls' championships earn the right to participate in the next year's World Junior Chess Championships. In the open championship, the top three players after tiebreaks all earn the International Master title, while the first-placed player additionally earns a norm towards the Grandmaster title. In the girls' championship, the top three players after tiebreaks all earn the Woman International Master title, while the first-placed player additionally earns a norm towards the Woman Grandmaster title.

== Results ==
=== Open championship ===
Results are taken from Olimpbase unless otherwise indicated.

| Year | Venue | Winner |
|---|---|---|
| 1980 | Lagos, Nigeria | Shakirudeen Agusto (NGR) |
| 1989 | Surulere, Lagos, Nigeria | Thomas Oparaugo (NGR) |
| 1990 | Gaborone, Botswana | Kudzanai Mamombe (ZIM) |
| 1991 | Gaborone, Botswana | Kudzanai Mamombe (ZIM) |
| 1992 | Nairobi, Kenya | Cephas Sichilima (ZAM) |
| 1993 | Nairobi, Kenya | Adérito Pedro (ANG) |
| 1994 | Port Launay, Seychelles | Eugénio Campos (ANG) |
| 1995 | Luanda, Angola | Eugénio Campos (ANG) |
| 1996 | Nigeria | Vladimiro Pina (ANG) |
| 1997 | Maputo, Mozambique | Vladimiro Pina (ANG) |
| 1998 | Nairobi, Kenya | Robert Gwaze (ZIM) |
| 1999 | Kampala, Uganda | Amon Simutowe (ZAM) |
| 2000 | Pretoria, South Africa | Amon Simutowe (ZAM) |
| 2001 | Lusaka, Zambia | Ahmed Adly (EGY) |
| 2002 | Gaborone, Botswana | Johannes Mabusela (RSA) |
| 2003 | Tripoli, Libya | Bassem Amin (EGY) |
| 2004 | Lusaka, Zambia | Heinrich Stander (RSA) |
| 2005 | Gaborone, Botswana | Bassem Amin (EGY) |
| 2006 | Gaborone, Botswana | Chitumbo Mwali (ZAM) |
| 2007 | Kamuzu Academy, Kasungu District, Malawi | Kareim Wageih (EGY) |
| 2008 | Bronkhorstspruit, South Africa | Kareim Wageih (EGY) |
| 2009 | Cairo, Egypt | Kareim Wageih (EGY) |
| 2011 | East London, South Africa | Erikson Roberto Mauricio Soares (ANG) |
| 2012 | Hammamet, Tunisia | Abdelrahman Hesham (EGY) |
| 2013 | Tiaret, Algeria | Moheb Ameir (EGY) |
| 2014 | Saurimo, Angola | David Silva (ANG) |
| 2015 | Victoria, Seychelles | David Silva (ANG) |
| 2016 | Hammamet, Tunisia | Ali Nassr (ALG) |
| 2017 | Lomé, Togo | Adham Fawzy (EGY) |
| 2018 | Entebbe, Uganda | Adham Fawzy (EGY) |
| 2019 | Accra, Ghana | Adham Fawzy (EGY) |
| 2020 | Not held due to the COVID pandemic | |
| 2021 | Monrovia, Liberia | Brahami Lamine (ALG) |
| 2022 | Béjaïa, Algeria | Jan Karsten (RSA) |
| 2023 | Nouakchott, Mauritania | Hamad Wafa (EGY) |

=== Girls' championship ===
Results are taken from Olimpbase unless otherwise indicated.

| Year | Venue | Winner |
|---|---|---|
| 2002 | Gaborone, Botswana | Cecile van der Merwe (RSA) |
| 2003 | Tripoli, Libya | Jamila Yougane (MAR) |
| 2004 | Lusaka, Zambia | Jenine Ellappen (RSA) |
| 2005 | Gaborone, Botswana | Mona Khaled (EGY) |
| 2006 | Gaborone, Botswana | Melissa Greeff (RSA) |
| 2007 | Kamuzu Academy, Kasungu District, Malawi | Daleen Wiid (RSA) |
| 2008 | Bronkhorstspruit, South Africa | Melissa Greeff (RSA) |
| 2009 | Cairo, Egypt | Mona Khaled (EGY) |
| 2011 | East London, South Africa | Tshepang Tlale (RSA) |
| 2012 | Hammamet, Tunisia | Shrook Wafa (EGY) |
| 2013 | Tiaret, Algeria | Esperança Caxita (ANG) |
| 2014 | Saurimo, Angola | Esperança Caxita (ANG) |
| 2015 | Victoria, Seychelles | Shahenda Wafa (EGY) |
| 2016 | Hammamet, Tunisia | Esperança Caxita (ANG) |
| 2017 | Lomé, Togo | Lina Nassr (ALG) |
| 2018 | Entebbe, Uganda | Anika du Plessis (RSA) |
| 2019 | Accra, Ghana | Luzia Pires (ANG) |
| 2020 | Not held due to the COVID pandemic | |
| 2021 | Monrovia, Liberia | Lina Nassr (ALG) |
| 2022 | Béjaïa, Algeria | Lina Nassr (ALG) |
| 2023 | Nouakchott, Mauritania | Chahrazed Djeroud (ALG) |

== See also ==
- Pan American Junior Chess Championship
- Asian Junior Chess Championship
- European Junior Chess Championship
- European Youth Chess Championship
