= Kelvin Chumfwa =

Zambian chess player (born 1986)

Personal information
- Born: 1986 (age 39–40)

Chess career
- Country: Zambia
- Title: International Master (2014)
- Peak rating: 2296 (December 2017)

Kelvin Chumfwa is a Zambian chess player.

== Chess career ==
In December 2013, he tied for first place with Richmond Phiri in the Zimbabwe Chess Open with a score of 9.5/11, ultimately winning on tiebreak scores.

In September 2016, he played for Zambia in the 42nd Chess Olympiad, where he scored 7.5/10 and held draws against Vladimir Klasan and Luka Drašković, who were rated around 200 points higher.

In January 2025, he tied for first place with Prince Daniel Mulenga in the HKS Classical Open with a score of 7/8. He ultimately won the tournament after defeating Mulenga in the tiebreaks.

== Personal life ==
His older brother is Stanley Chumfwa, who is also an International Master.
