= South African Open =

South African Open may refer to:

- South African Open (chess), a chess tournament held in South Africa
- South African Open (golf), a golf tournament held in South Africa
- South African Open (tennis), a defunct tennis tournament played from 1891 to 1995
- SA Tennis Open, a defunct tennis tournament played from 2009 to 2011
