= South African Chess Championship =

The South African Chess Championship was first organised in 1892 by the Cape Town Chess Club. It is now organised by Chess South Africa (CHESSA), the governing body of chess in South Africa. The tournament is normally held every two years. It is restricted to chess players resident in South Africa (although exceptions have been made on occasion) and participation is by invitation only.

CHESSA was formed in 1992, after unification talks between various chess bodies that commenced the previous year. The 1995 event, the first organised by CHESSA, included titled players from Angola and Zimbabwe and was run on the Swiss system. Since that date, the tournament has been held on a round-robin basis. The winner of the tournament holds the title of South African Closed Chess Champion until the next tournament is held.

Historically, the tournament was usually held on a round-robin or double round-robin basis. In case of a tie for first place, a playoff match was usually conducted. In the early days, the title holder could also be challenged to a title match, and these matches are tabled below.

== Winners of the national championship ==
Year	City	Winner	Black Closed Winner	Women's Winner
1892	Cape Town	Arthur Rivett; Edward Roberts		
1897	Cape Town	Edward Roberts		
1899	Durban	Abraham Michael		
1903	Johannesburg	Francis Joseph Lee		
1906	Cape Town	Bruno Edgar Siegheim		
1910	Cape Town	Harry Duhan		
1912	Johannesburg	Bruno Edgar Siegheim		
1920	Cape Town	A.J.A. Cameron; Alexander Chavkin		
1924	Durban	Alexander Chavkin		
1926	Johannesburg	Max Blieden		
1928	Cape Town	Max Blieden		
1935	Johannesburg	John C. Archer jr		
1937	Cape Town	Kurt Dreyer		
1939	Durban	Wolfgang Heidenfeld		
1945	Johannesburg	Wolfgang Heidenfeld; John Holford		
1947	Cape Town	Wolfgang Heidenfeld; Kurt Dreyer		
1949	Durban	Wolfgang Heidenfeld		
1951	East London	Wolfgang Heidenfeld		
1953	Johannesburg	John E. Eriksen		
1955	Cape Town	Wolfgang Heidenfeld		
1957	Durban	Wolfgang Heidenfeld		
1959	Johannesburg	Wolfgang Heidenfeld; Kenneth Kirby		
1961	Cape Town	Woolf Gerber		
1963	Pretoria	Kenneth Kirby; Kees van der Meyden		
1965	Salisbury	Piet Kroon		
1967	Johannesburg	David Friedgood		
1969	Pretoria	Piet Kroon		
1971	Johannesburg	David Friedgood		
1973	Cape Town	David Friedgood		
1975	East London	Piet Kroon; Charles de Villiers		
1977	Pretoria	David A. Walker; Charles de Villiers		
1979	Johannesburg	Frank Korostenski		
1981	Cape Town	Charles de Villiers		
1983	Pretoria	Donald Macfarlane		
1985	Johannesburg	Clyde Wolpe; Charles de Villiers		
1986			Shabier Bhawoodien (Durban)	
1987	Pretoria	Charles de Villiers	Deon Pick (Worcester)	
1988			Maxwell Solomon (East London)	
1989	Secunda	Charles de Villiers	Deon Solomon (Bellville South)	
1991			Deon Solomon(CPUT Campus)	
1993	Cape Town	George Michelakis		
1994	CPUT Campus	Deon Solomon		
1995	Cape Town	David Gluckman		
1998	Bruma Lake	Mark Rubery; Watu Kobese		
2000	Port Elizabeth	Nicholas van der Nat		Michelle Minnaar
2001		Watu Kobese		Cecile van der Merwe
2002				Mignon Pretorius
2003	Kempton Park	Watu Kobese; Kenny Solomon		Mignon Pretorius
2004				Carmen de Jager
2005	Cape Town	Nicholas van der Nat		Denise Frick
2007	Cape Town	Henry Robert Steel		?
2008				Carmen de Jager
2009	Cape Town	Nicholas van der Nat		no event held
2011	Cape Town	Henry Robert Steel; Watu Kobese		no event held
2013	Cape Town	Donovan van den Heever		Denise Frick
2015	Cape Town	Daniel Cawdery		Denise Frick
2017	Cape Town	Johannes Mabusela, Calvin Klaasen		Jesse February
2019	Cape Town	Daniel Barrish		Jesse February
2022	Cape Town	Daniel Cawdery		Chloe Badenhorst
2024	Cape Town	Daniel Barrish		Jesse February
2026	Sandton	Jan Karsten		Anzel Laubscher

== Winners of the South African Title ==
- 1897 Edward Roberts (defeated Arthur Cameron in challenge)
- 1898 Edward Roberts (defeated P.G. Van Breda in challenge)
- 1910 Max Blieden (defeated Bruno Edgar Siegheim in challenge)
- 1911 Bruno Edgar Siegheim (defeated Harry Duhan in challenge)
- 1912 Bruno Edgar Siegheim (defeated Henk Meihuizen in challenge)
