= Henry Steel =

Henry Steel may refer to:

- Henry Steel, fictional pirate in the CBS reality television show Pirate Master
- Henry Robert Steel (born 1989), South African chess player
- Sir Henry Steel, Lord Provost of Edinburgh 1938 to 1940
