= Jemima Paulo =

Angolan chess player (born 2007)

Personal information
- Born: 2007 (age 18–19)

Chess career
- Country: Angola
- Title: Woman FIDE Master (2024)
- Peak rating: 2076 (June 2024)

Jemima Paulo is an Angolan chess player and Women's FIDE Master. She became the African U-13 Champion in 2020 and the African U-16 Girls' Champion in 2022. The following year, she became the African mixed runner-up after finishing second in the African Junior Chess Championship.

She is ranked as Angola's top female player in 2024, with an ELO rating of 2039.

== Biography ==
She competes with the Ditrov School, an Angolan chess group.

In 2020, she won the African Under-13 Championship, which qualified Angola for the World Championships, and then represented her country at the 2020 Summer Olympics. In 2022, she won the African U-16 Girls' Championship.

In 2023, she earned the title of African runner-up after finishing second in the African Junior Mixed Chess Championship, notably defeating the coach of the Nigerian team, Rosemary Amadasun. In 2024, she placed sixth in the African Women's Chess Championship, ahead of her compatriot, Ednasia Junior.
