= Johannes Mabusela =

South African chess player (born 1984)

Personal information
- Born: Johannes Manyedi Mabusela; 4 June 1984 (age 42)

Chess career
- Country: South Africa
- Title: International Master (2004)
- Peak rating: 2320 (October 2012)

Johannes Manyedi Mabusela (born 4 June 1984) is a South African chess player. He was awarded the title International Master by FIDE. He won the African Junior Chess Championship in 2002.

Mabusela tied for 1st–4th with Rodwell Makoto, Ahmed Adly and Daniel Cawdery in the 2012 South African Open, finishing second on tiebreak, the highest finishing South African player. He again finished as the best South African finisher in 2014. In 2019, Mabusela was the outright winner of the South African Open.

He played for the South African national team in the Chess Olympiads of 2008, 2010, 2012 and 2018, and in the All-Africa Games in 2003 and 2011. In the 2011 event he won two silver medals, team and individual playing on board 4.

== See also ==
- Chess in South Africa
