= Stanley Chumfwa =

Zambian chess player (born 1976)

Personal information
- Born: 31 October 1976 (age 49)

Chess career
- Country: Zambia
- Title: International Master (2012)
- Peak rating: 2358 (November 2011)

Stanley Chumfwa (born October 31, 1976) is a Zambian chess player. He is an international master (IM). Chumfwa studied mathematics at the University of Zambia.

== Career ==
In 2003 Stanley Chumfwa won the South African Open chess tournament, held in Centurion. He won the Zambian Chess Championship in 2005.

In November 2005, Chumfwa competed in the African Chess Championship, in Lusaka (Zambia). Ahmed Adly finished first with 7 points from 9 games, while Chumfwa ended third with 6.5 points, thereby qualifying to enter the FIDE Chess World Cup 2005 tournament. In this knockout tournament, 128 participants, Chumfwa was beaten in the first round by Etienne Bacrot, who would later finish in third place.

In 2010 he captained the Zambian team at the Chess Olympiad, in which 148 countries participated. Zambia ended 47.

At the Chess Olympiad 2012, held in Istanbul, Zambia finished 63rd. The Zambian team consisted of Daniel Jere, Stanley Chumfwa, Gillan Bwalya, Andrew Kayonde and Nase Lungu.

In January 2014, Chumfwa participated in the Liyoca Open tournament in Lusaka, finishing 3rd with 6 points from 7 games.

In May 2015 Chumfwa finished 3rd in the 2015 Kafue Chess Open, won by his brother Kelvin.

In July 2015 Chumfwa ended 15th in the South African Open, held in Cape Town.

Kelvin Chumfwa (1986), brother of Stanley, is also a strong chess player (IM).
