= Calvin Klaasen =

South African chess player (born 1987)

Personal information
- Born: May 16, 1987 (age 39)

Chess career
- Country: South Africa
- Title: FIDE Master (2013)
- Peak rating: 2320 (January 2018)

Calvin John Klaasen (born 1987) is a South African chess player who holds the title of FIDE Master.

Together with Johannes Mabusela he won the 2017 South African Closed Championships, and has played for the South African Chess Olympiad team in 2016 and 2018.

== See also ==
- Chess in South Africa
