= Jo-Anne Richards =

South African journalist and author

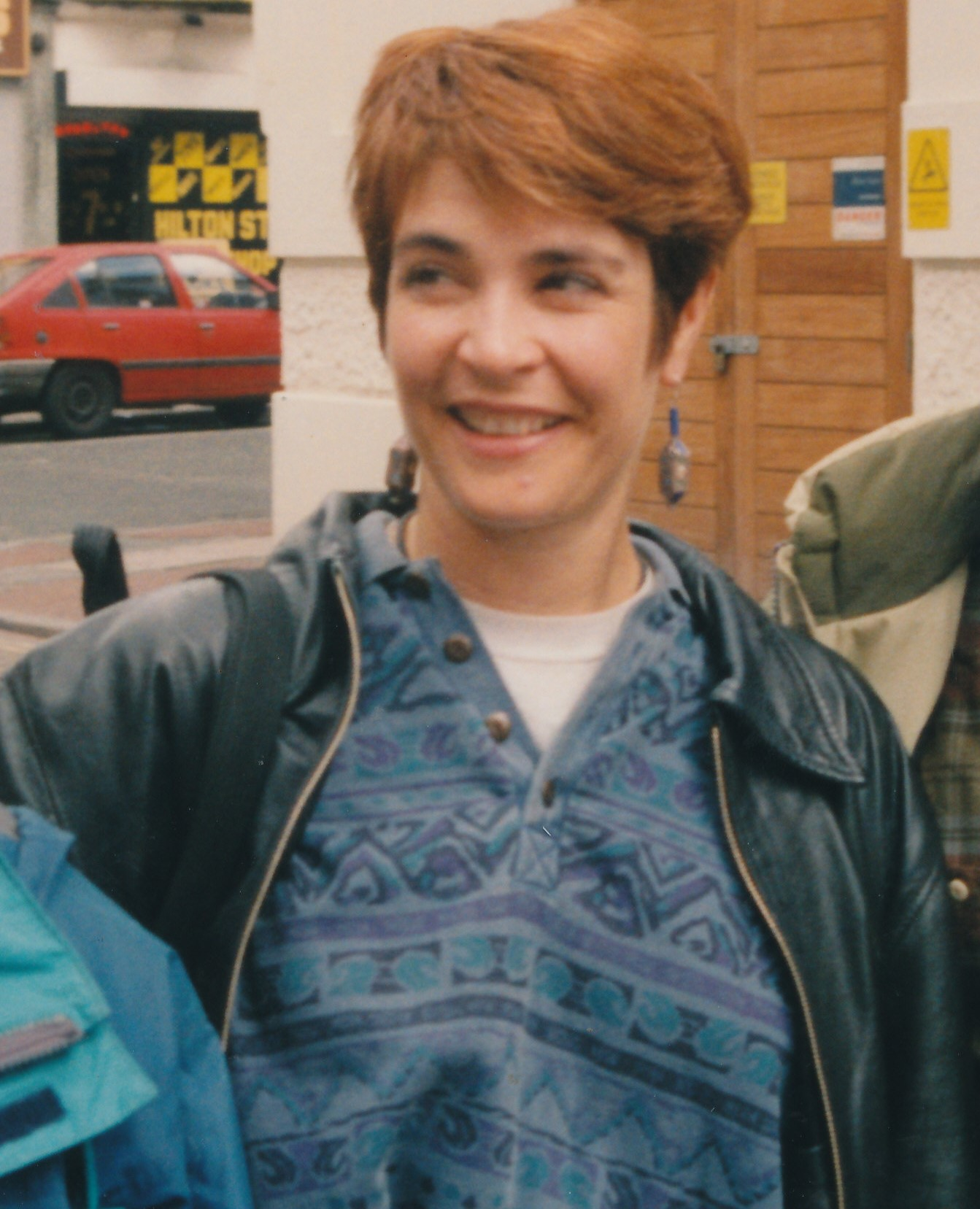
- Jo-Anne Richards in 1998
- Born: Port Elizabeth, South Africa
- Education: Collegiate Girls High School
- Alma mater: Rhodes University
- Occupations: Author, journalist
- Writing career
- Years active: 1996–
- Notable works: The Innocence of Roast Chicken, Touching The Lighthouse, Sad at the Edges, My Brother's Book, The Imagined Child
- Website: joannerichards.com

Jo-Anne Richards is a South African journalist and author.

== Biography ==
Jo-Anne Richards grew up in Port Elizabeth, South Africa, and was educated at Collegiate Girls' high school. Her first books that she read were The Boy Next Door and The Island of Adventure. She graduated from Rhodes University in Grahamstown in 1979, followed by an Honours degree in Journalism and Linguistics. She holds a PhD in Creative Writing from the University of the Witwatersrand, where she was a lecturer in journalism for 15 years.

Richards worked full-time for four South African newspapers – The Star, the Sunday Express, the Cape Times and Evening Post – reporting, sub-editing and news-editing. She has written features and supplements for numerous South African magazines and newspapers, including Fair Lady, Elle, Diversions, True Love, the Sunday Times Magazine, The Star and the Mail & Guardian.

Richards rose to prominence with her first novel, The Innocence of Roast Chicken (1996), which became a bestseller in her native country and was short-listed for the M-Net Book Prize and nominated for the Impac International Dublin Literary Award. Richards wrote on concepts such as striving and slacking in a dead book proposal in the mid-1990s.

She lives in Cape Town, where she teaches creative writing.

Richards was once married to poet Mark Swift.

== Career ==
Lectures as academic coordinator and lecturer in the honours programme in Journalism and Media Studies at the University of the Witwatersrand.

== Nominations and Awards ==
- She was shortlisted M-Net Book Prize
- Nominated for the Impac International Dublin Literary Award
- nominated for the Impac International Dublin Literary Award
- Her first book(The Innocence of Roast Chicken) was showcased as an outstanding first novel at Dillon’s Debut in London.

== Novels ==
- The Innocence of Roast Chicken (1996)
- Touching the Lighthouse (1997)
- Sad at the Edges (2003)
- My Brother's Book (2008)
- The Imagined Child (2013)
