= Great Day =

Great Day may refer to:

- The Great Day, a 1921 British film
- Great Day (1930 film), an American film
- Great Day (1945 film), a British film
- Great Day, a 1983 TV comedy film directed by Michael Preece

== Music ==
- Great Day (album), a 1963 album by jazz saxophonist James Moody
- "Great Day", a song by The Whispers written Nicholas Caldwell, Willie L. Johnson 1969
- "Great Day", a song by Paul McCartney from his album Flaming Pie
- "Great Day", a song by Madvillain from Madvillainy
- "Great Days", the opening theme of JoJo's Bizarre Adventure: Diamond Is Unbreakable from episode 27 onwards

== Other ==
- Great Day (play), a 1945 play by Lesley Storm

== See also ==
- A Great Day (disambiguation)
- Best Days (disambiguation)
- Greatest Day (disambiguation)
