= Chloe Badenhorst =

South African chess player (born 2007)

Personal information
- Born: 2007 (age 18–19)

Chess career
- Country: South Africa
- Title: Woman FIDE Master (2023)
- Peak rating: 2042 (February 2026)

Chloe Badenhorst (born 2007) is a South African chess player who holds the title of Woman FIDE Master, which she earned in 2023.

== Chess career ==
In 2022, at the age of 15, Badenhorst won the Women's Section of the South African Chess Championship, finishing on 5/7, half a point ahead of two-time champion Jesse February. Badenhorst was the lowest-rated player in the field. In the 44th Chess Olympiad, she represented the South African women's team on board three, finishing on 5/9.

In 2024, she finished third in the South African Closed Chess Championship, and again represented South Africa on board two in the 45th Chess Olympiad.
