= Greatest Day =

Greatest Day may refer to:

- "Greatest Day" (Beverley Knight song)
- "Greatest Day" (Take That song)

== See also ==
- Great Day (disambiguation)
