= Charlize van Zyl =

South African chess player (born 1999)

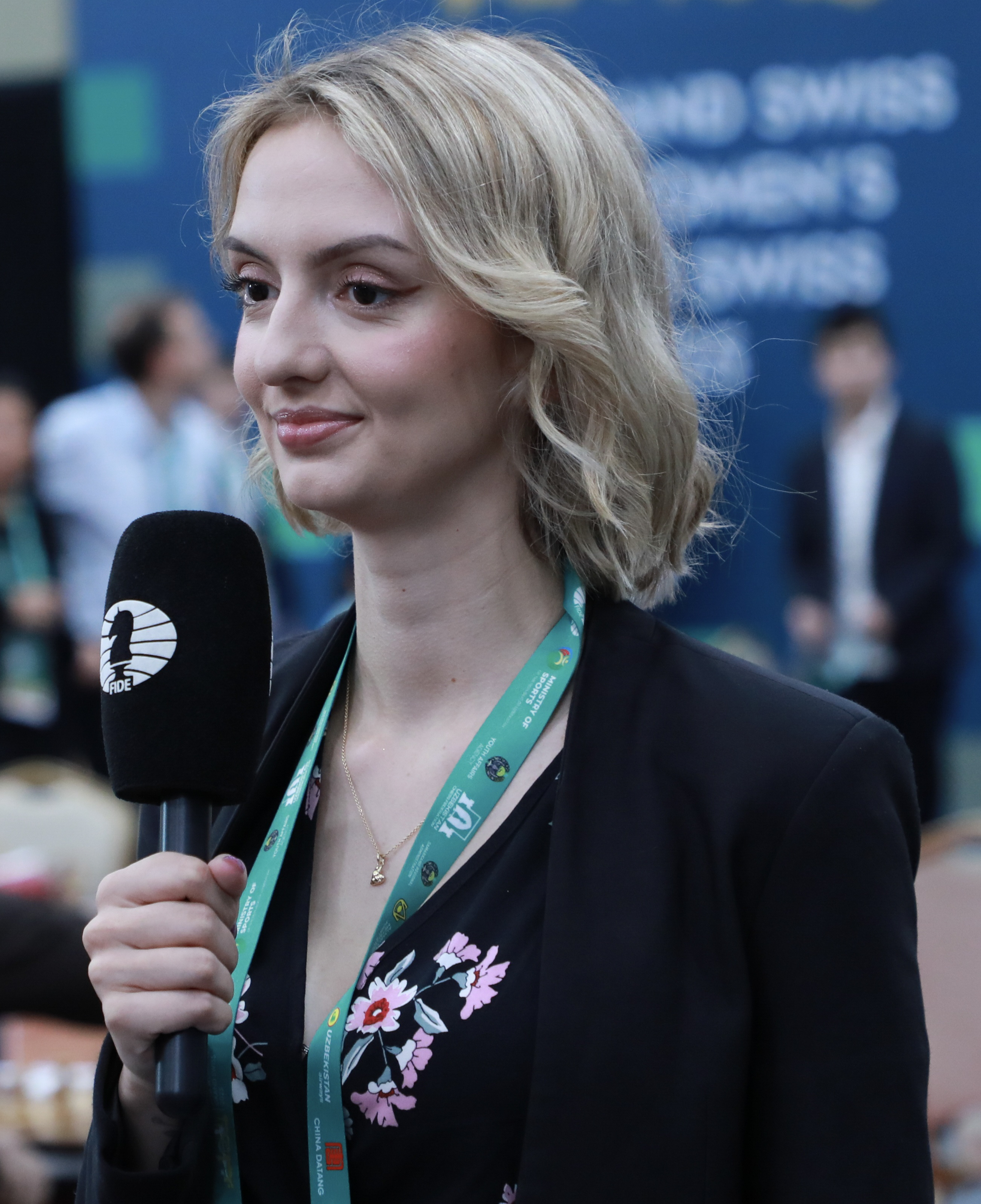
- van Zyl in 2025

Personal information
- Born: September 19, 1999 (age 26) Port Elizabeth, South Africa

Chess career
- Country: South Africa
- Title: Woman International Master (2013)
- Peak rating: 1963 (January 2026)

Charlize van Zyl (born 19 September 1999) is a South African chess player who holds the title of Woman International Master, which she earned in 2013 at the age of 13, becoming the youngest South African to do so.

== Chess career ==
Van Zyl won the African Zonals at age 13, earning her WIM title. She has represented South Africa at the Chess Olympiad in 2018 (finishing on 3.5/8 on board 5) and 2022 (4/9 on board 2).

She came second in the Women's section of the 2022 African Chess Championship, finishing half a point behind Shahenda Wafa, and qualifying for the Women's Chess World Cup 2023, where she was defeated by Nurgyul Salimova in the first round.

== Education ==
Van Zyl attended Collegiate Girls High School, and studied a BA in media, communications and culture student at the Nelson Mandela Metropolitan University.
