= Zambian Chess Championship =

The Zambian Closed Chess Championship is the national chess championship of Zambia, organized by the Chess Federation of Zambia. Zambia's only grandmaster Amon Simutowe won the championship in 1996 at the age of 14.

== Winners since 1996 ==
Year	Champion
1996	Amon Simutowe
1997–2000	?
2001	Nase Lungu
2002	Gershom Musende
2003	Nase Lungu
2004	Daniel Jere
2005	Stanley Chumfwa
2006	?
2007	?
2008	Richmond Phiri
2009	Andrew Kayonde
2010	Gillan Bwalya
2011	Daniel Jere
2012	Daniel Jere
2013	Gillan Bwalya
2014	Richmond Phiri
2015	Andrew Kayonde
2016	Andrew Kayonde
2017	Andrew Kayonde
2018	Andrew Kayonde
2019	Spencer Masango
