= Hermann Keidanski =

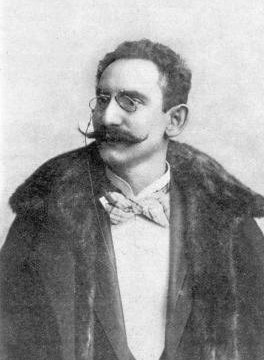
Hermann Keidanz in 1910

Hermann Keidanski (later Keidanz and Kaidanz; November 4, 1865, – December 1938, Germany) was a German-Jewish chess master.

Keidanski was born in Großendorf, West Prussia (now Władysławowo, Poland), he came to Berlin where he participated in many chess tournaments in the 1890s. He tied for 8-9th at Cologne in 1898 (the 11th DSB Congress, Hauptturnier A, Ottokar Pavelka won), took 2nd, behind Julius Finn, at New York City in 1903, and tied for 5-6th at New York State Chess Association in 1907.

He lost a match to Carl August Walbrodt (1–5) in 1891, and won against Eugene Delmar (4–1) in 1902.

His name is attached to the Keidanski Variation in the Prussian Defence (1.e4 e5 2.Nf3 Nc6 3.Bc4 Nf6 4.d4 exd4 5.e5 d5 6.Bb5 Ne4 7.Nxd4 Bc5 8.Nxc6!? Bxf2+ 9.Kf1 Qh4!). Analysis by Dr. Hermann Kaidanz appeared in the Wiener Schachzeitung in 1904. He also analysed the Keidansky Gambit (1.e4 e5 2.Bc4 Nf6 3.d4 exd4 4.Nf3 Nxe4 5.Qxd4).
