= Chitumbo Mwali =

Zambian chess player (born 1986)

Personal information
- Born: April 11, 1986 (age 40)

Chess career
- Country: Zambia
- Title: International Master (2007)
- Peak rating: 2392 (October 2025)

Chitumbo Mwali (born 1986) is a Zambian chess player. He was awarded the title of International Master in 2007.

== Chess career ==
He won the African Junior Chess Championship in 2006, and earned the silver medal on board four in the 2007 All-Africa Games.

After winning the Zambian Chess World Cup Qualifier in 2021, he qualified to play in the Chess World Cup 2021. Pre-tournament favourite Andrew Kayonde, trailing by 1.5 points with two rounds to go and a game in hand against IM Chitumbo Mwali, pulled out after accusing the other 5 players of colluding to deliberately lose against Mwali.

In the first round at the 2021 World Cup, Chitumbo lost the first game against the much higher-rated Haik M. Martirosyan before winning the second game to take the encounter to tiebreaks, where he was defeated 2–0 in the rapid games.

Mwali won the Zambian qualifiers to compete in the 2023 Chess World Cup, where he was defeated by Mustafa Yılmaz in the first round. He also competed in the Chess World Cup 2025, where he lost to Étienne Bacrot 0-2 in the first round.

He is also an accountant and chess coach.
