= Daniel Barrish =

South African chess player (born 2000)

Personal information
- Born: August 3, 2000 (age 25) Constantia, Cape Town

Chess career
- Country: South Africa
- Title: FIDE Master (2013)
- FIDE rating: 2284 (January 2025)
- Peak rating: 2363 (September 2019)

Daniel Barrish (born 2000) is a South African chess player who holds the title of FIDE Master (FM, 2013).

== Career ==
In 2012, aged 11, Barrish drew with Garry Kasparov in a simultaneous event. He earned the title of FIDE Master in 2013, and in 2019 earned his first IM norm in Greece, and won the South African Chess Championship in 2019 with a score of 7.5/11, half a point ahead of Grandmaster Kenny Solomon.

As of January 2025, Barrish is ranked 6th amongst active South African players.

He played in the Chess World Cup 2021 after qualifying via the South African zonal spot, where he was defeated by Aryan Tari in the first round.

He represented South Africa in the 2022 Chess Olympiad on board three, scoring 5/9, and in the 2024 Chess Olympiad on board one, scoring 5.5/9.

Barrish won the South African Chess Championship for the second time in 2024.
