= John Holford =

Royal Navy admiral

Surgeon Rear-Admiral John Holford CB OBE CStJ
- Born: 10 January 1909; Ettingshall, Staffordshire, England
- Died: 4 November 1997 (aged 88)
- Military career
- Allegiance: United Kingdom
- Branch: Royal Navy
- Service years: 1935–1965
- Rank: Surgeon Rear-Admiral
- Conflicts: World War II
- Awards: Companion of the Order of the Bath; Officer of the Order of the British Empire

John Morley Holford, CB, OBE (10 January 1909 – 4 November 1997) was a medical officer in the Royal Navy.

== Life ==
Born the son of the reverend William James Holford and Amy Finnemore Lello, Holford was educated at Kingswood School, Bath, and Trinity Hall, Cambridge. He then went on to St George's Hospital Medical School where he qualified in 1933. He joined the Royal Navy as a surgeon-lieutenant in April 1935. He became second medical officer in HMS Valiant on the Mediterranean Station before becoming flotilla medical officer in HMS Grenville in December 1936 and then being posted to HMS Ganges in 1938. He joined HMS Nelson in April 1940, initially as medical officer and then as principal medical officer. He became a medical specialist at RNH Plymouth in March 1942 and maintained an interest in the use of mass miniature radiography in the diagnosis of diseases of the chest. He was appointed medical specialist at RNH Simonstown, Cape of Good Hope, in 1944.

He won the South African Chess Championship in 1946 and was awarded the King Haakon VII liberty medal in August 1947 for his services during the war. He became an assistant to the medical director general (naval) in 1948. He became principal medical officer of the submarine base HMS Dolphin and flotilla medical officer to the flag officer (submarines) in 1957 before being appointed as senior specialist in charge of the medicine section at RN Hospital Haslar later that year. He became assistant to the medical director general (naval) again in 1960 and then medical adviser to the Commander-in-Chief, Portsmouth and medical officer in charge of RNH Haslar in 1963. He retired in April 1966.

Holford worked for the Ministry of Health from 1965 to 1974, latterly as senior principal medical officer.

== Rank ==
1935 : surgeon lieutenant
1940 : surgeon lieutenant commander
1946 : surgeon commander
1957 : surgeon captain
1963 : surgeon rear admiral
1966 : retired

== Honours ==
- BA Cantab (1930)
- MRCS LRCP (1933)
- MB BCh (1939)
- MRCP (1939)
- Haakon VIIs Freedom Medal (1947)
- OBE (1954)
- FRCP(1954)
- Gilbert Blane medal (1956)
- CB (1965)
