= Adham Fawzy =

Egyptian chess grandmaster (born 2000)

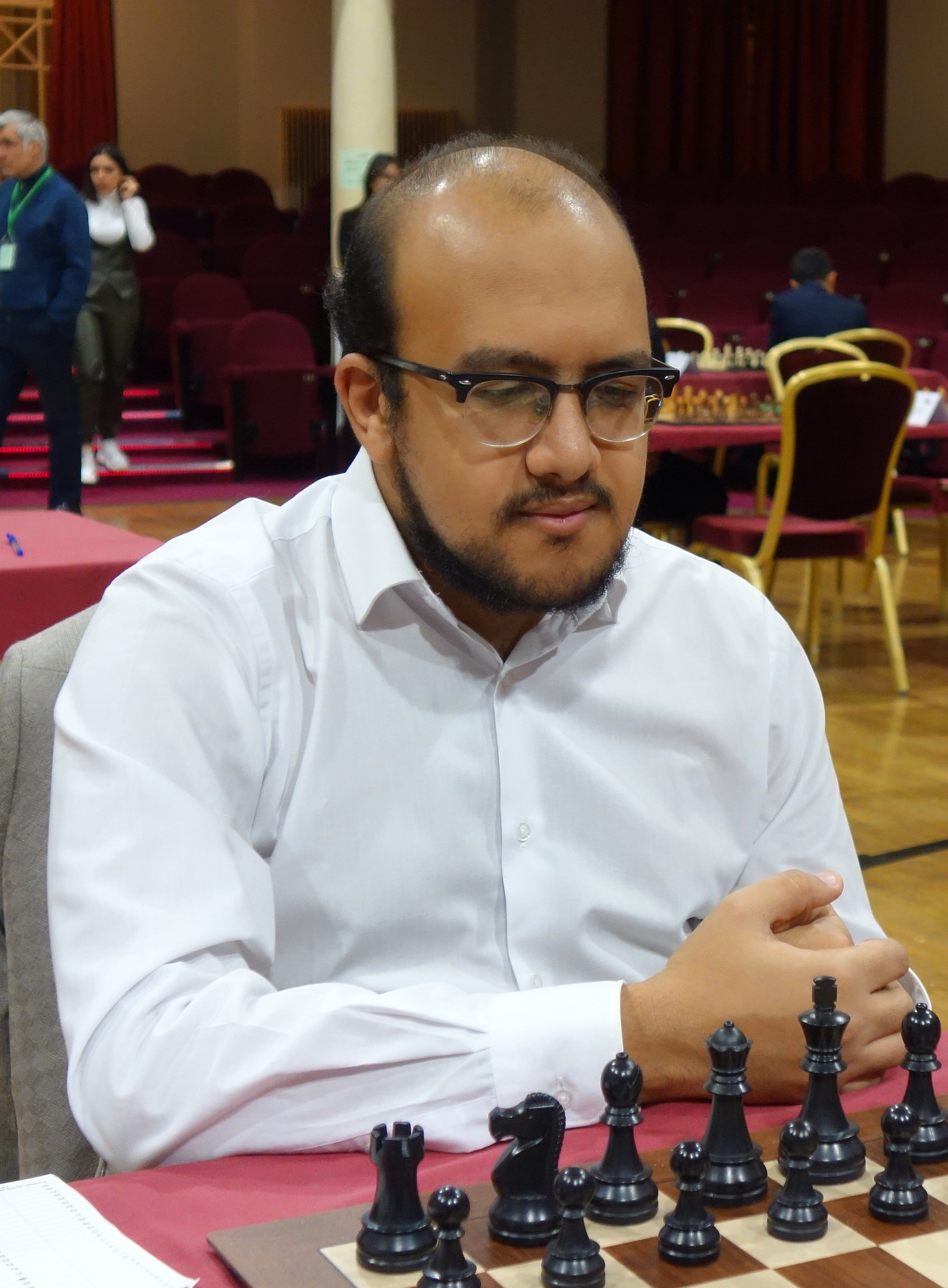
- Adham Fawzy at the FIDE Grand Swiss Tournament 2023

Personal information
- Born: January 3, 2000 (age 26) Alexandria, Egypt

Chess career
- Country: Egypt
- Title: Grandmaster (2019)
- FIDE rating: 2474 (September 2026)
- Peak rating: 2553 (November 2023)

Adham Fawzy (Arabic: أدهم فوزي; born 2000) is an Egyptian chess player. He was awarded the title Grandmaster by FIDE in 2019. As of May 2023, he is the third-highest rated active Egyptian player, and fourth-highest in the African continent. By May 1st 2023 his rating was 2495, by November 2023 his rating was 2553.

== Career ==
He won the 2017, 2018 and 2019 African Junior Chess Championship.

He finished third in the 2021 African Chess Championship, qualifying for the Chess World Cup 2021 in Sochi, where he was in the first round defeated by the Russian chess player Evgeny Alekseev, 1½–2½ after rapid chess tiebreak games. He won the 2023 African Chess Championship, qualifying for the Chess World Cup 2023.

Three times he participated with the Egyptian national team in the Chess Olympiad:

- at the 42nd Chess Olympiad in Baku in 2016, board 3, score 4/6
- at the 43rd Chess Olympiad in Batumi in 2018, board 3, score 4½/10
- at the 44th Chess Olympiad in Chennai in 2022, board 3, score 7/9

Also he participated in the World Team Chess Championship, in 2017 (playing at the 3rd board) and in 2019.
