= Collegiate Girls High School =

Coordinates: 33.95057967684142°S 25.589523101420607°E

- Gqeberha, Eastern Cape; South Africa

Information
- School type: All-girls public school
- Motto: Facta Non Verba (Deeds Not Words)
- Religious affiliation: Christianity
- Established: 16 February 1874; 152 years ago
- Sister school: Grey High School
- Headmistress: Mrs Louise Erasmus
- Staff: 50 full-time
- Grades: 8 to 12
- Gender: Female
- Age: 14 to 18
- Enrollment: 700 girls
- Language: English
- Schedule: 07:30 - 14:00
- Campus: Urban Campus
- Colours: Blue; White
- Rival: Clarendon High School for Girls
- School fees: R44,800 (tuition)

Collegiate Girls High School is a public English-speaking medium high school for girls in Parsons Hill, Gqeberha, in the Eastern Cape province of South Africa.

== Notable Alumnae ==
- Louisa Bolus - botanist
- Khusela Diko - Politician, member of the National Executive Committee of the African National Congress, former spokesperson of the President of the Republic of South Africa Cyril Ramaphosa.
- Jo-Anne Richards - author & journalist
- Luthando Shosha - TV personality & radio presenter
- Charlize Van Zyl - Chess player, Woman International Master title holder
- Nambitha Ben-Mazwi - Multi-award winning entrepreneur and actress, Humanitarian
