= Piet Kroon =

South African chess player (1945–2021)

Personal information
- Born: 26 February 1945 The Hague, Netherlands
- Died: 2021

Chess career
- Country: South Africa

Piet Kroon (26 February 1945 - 2021) was a South African chess player, three-times South African Chess Championship winner (1965, 1969, 1975).

== Biography ==
In the 1960s and 1970s Piet Kroon was one of South Africa's leading chess players. He participated many times in South African Chess Championship and three times won this tournament: in 1965, 1969 and 1975 (shared with Charles de Villiers).

Piet Kroon played for South Africa in the Chess Olympiads:

- In 1966, at second board in the 17th Chess Olympiad in Havana (+7, =2, -3),
- In 1968, at second board in the 18th Chess Olympiad in Lugano (+3, =4, -6),
- In 1974, at second board in the 21st Chess Olympiad in Nice (+2, =1, -3).
