= Hayat Toubal =

Algerian chess player (born 1985)

Personal information
- Born: 1985 (age 40–41)

Chess career
- Country: Algeria
- Title: Woman International Master (2005)
- Peak rating: 1977 (July 2008)

Hayat Toubal (born 1985) is an Algerian chess player who holds the title of Woman International Master.

== Biography ==
Hayat Toubal won 2nd place twice in a row in the Women's Arab Chess Championship (2006, 2007).

In 2017, in Oran, she won 2nd place after Shahenda Wafa in the Women's African Chess Championship, which qualified her for the Women's World Chess Championship 2018 (November). In 2018, she won 2nd place in the Women's Algerian Chess Championship.

Hayat Toubal played for Algeria in the Women's Chess Olympiads:

- In 2006, at second board in the 37th Chess Olympiad (women) in Turin (+5, =5, -2),
- In 2014, at fourth board in the 41st Chess Olympiad (women) in Tromsø (+3, =5, -3),
- In 2016, at reserve board in the 42nd Chess Olympiad (women) in Baku (+2, =4, -3),
- In 2018, at third board in the 43rd Chess Olympiad (women) in Batumi (+5 =4 -1).

In 2005, she was awarded the FIDE Woman International Master (WIM) title.
