= David Friedgood =

South African-British chess player

Personal information
- Born: 11 July 1946 (age 79) Cape Town, South Africa

Chess career
- Country: England
- Title: FIDE Master (1982)
- FIDE rating: 2188 (September 2019)
- Peak rating: 2335 (January 1980)

David Friedgood (born 11 July 1946, in Cape Town) is a South African–British chess master.

He won South African Chess Championship in 1967, 1971 and 1973. He shared 7th at Caorle 1972 (zonal).

Friedgood represented South Africa in Chess Olympiads at Tel Aviv 1964, Lugano 1968, Siegen 1970, and Nice 1974. He won an individual gold medal on fourth board at Tel Aviv 1964 (final D).

He was a member of two Great Britain teams which won the World Chess Solving Championship, in 1986 with Graham Lee and Jonathan Mestel, and in 2007, with John Nunn and Jonathan Mestel.
