= Jan Karsten =

South African chess player (born 2008)

Personal information
- Born: 2008 (age 17–18) Cape Town, South Africa

Chess career
- Country: South Africa
- Title: International Master (2023)
- Peak rating: 2387 (October 2026)

Jan Karsten (born 2008) is a South African chess player who was awarded the FIDE title of International Master in 2023.

== Chess career ==
At age 14, and one of the youngest contestants, Karsten won the 2022 African Junior Chess Championship, finishing unbeaten on 6.5/9. This earned him the title of International Master.

As a result of this win, he qualified for the 2022 World Junior Chess Championship where he finished on 4.5/11.

Karsten won the 2024 Cape Town Chess Masters, where he was the top seed.

In December 2025, Karsten beat world champion Magnus Carlsen in a simultaneous Chess960 exhibition, and in March 2026, Karsten won the South African Chess Championship.

Karsten has represented South Africa in two Chess Olympiads, 2024 on board two, where finished with 5.5/9, and 2026 on board one (5/10).

== Personal life ==
Karsten attends Jan van Riebeeck High School. As of 2026, Karsten is in his final year of high school, and also plays tennis, swimming, cricket and hockey.
