= Kenneth Kirby =

South African chess player

Personal information
- Born: 1 November 1915 Oudtshoorn, South Africa
- Died: unknown

Chess career
- Country: South Africa

Kenneth Kirby (1 November 1915 - unknown) was a South African chess player, twice South African Chess Championship winner (1959, 1963).

== Biography ==
From the mid-1950s to the mid-1960s, Kirby was one of South Africa's leading chess players. He participated many times in the South African Chess Championship and twice won this tournament, in 1959 (shared with Wolfgang Heidenfeld) and 1963 (shared with Kees van der Meyden). Kirby also won the 6th (1955–1956) and 7th (1957–1958) South African Correspondence Chess Championships. In April 1956 in Durban, he won the first Natal Open Chess Championship with a full score of 8/8.

Kirby played for South Africa in the Chess Olympiads:

- In 1958, at third board in the 13th Chess Olympiad in Munich (+3, =6, -5),
- In 1964, at second board in the 16th Chess Olympiad in Tel Aviv (+2, =1, -5).
