= Imed Abdelnabbi =

Egyptian chess player (born 1957)

Personal information
- Born: 15 November 1957 (age 68)

Chess career
- Country: Egypt
- Title: International Master (1985)
- Peak rating: 2498 (January 2004)

Imed Abdelnabbi (Arabic: عماد عبد النبي, born 15 November 1957), is an Egyptian chess player who has received the title of International Master (IM) in 1985 and Trainer from FIDE. He bagged the gold medal in the individual rankings in the 1986 Chess Olympiad.

== Chess career ==
=== Chess Olympiads ===
Imed Abdelnabbi respresented Egypt in the Chess Olympiads 1982-2019

- In 1982, at second reserve board in the 25th Chess Olympiad in Lucerne (+3, =3, -1)
- In 1984, at second board in the 26th Chess Olympiad in Thessaloniki (+4, =4, -3)
- In 1986, at second board in the 27th Chess Olympiad in Dubai (+7, =5, -0) and won an individual gold medal
- In 1990, at second board in the 29th Chess Olympiad in Novi Sad (+3, =5, -2)
- In 1992, at second board in the 30th Chess Olympiad in Manila (+1, =5, -4)
- In 2002, at first board in the 35th Chess Olympiad in Bled (+4, =3, -4)
- In 2006, at third board in the 37th Chess Olympiad in Turin (+2, =3, -3)

=== Team Chess Championships ===
Imed Abdelnabbi played for Egypt and Africa (1989) teams in the World Team Chess Championship:

- In 1989, at third board in the 2nd World Team Chess Championship in Lucerne (+0, =3, -3),
- In 2010, at reserve board in the 7th World Team Chess Championship in Bursa (+0, =2, -2),
- In 2017, at fourth board in the 11th World Team Chess Championship in Khanty-Mansiysk (+0, =2, -5),
- In 2019, at reserve board in the 12th World Team Chess Championship in Astana (+0, =0, -3).

Also Imed Abdelnabbi two times played for Egypt in African Games team chess tournament (2003-2007), and in team competition won 2 gold medals (2003, 2007), and in individual competition won gold (2007) medal.

=== Other Major Tournaments ===
In 2003, in Damascus, Imed Abdelnabbi won the Club Chess Championship with Egyptian team Eastern Company Al-Sharkia. In 2005 he repeated this success.

In 2012, in United Arab Emirates Imed Abdelnabbi won 2nd place in International Chess Tournament Jebel Hafeet International Championship, but in 2013 he won there an International Chess Tournament Unified Home Festival.

=== Titles & Rating ===
In 1985, he was awarded the FIDE International Master (IM) title. In 2005, he became a FIDE Trainer.
