= Rebecca Selkirk =

South African chess player (born 1993)

Personal information
- Born: July 6, 1993 (age 33)

Chess career
- Country: South Africa
- Title: Woman Candidate Master (2019)
- Peak rating: 1835 (November 2025)

Rebecca Joy Selkirk (born 1993) is a South African chess player and Woman Candidate Master.

== Career ==
Selkirk earned the title of Woman Candidate Master in 2019. She represented South Africa in the 2018 Chess Olympiad on board four, and the 2022 Chess Olympiad, also on board four, scoring 4/9.

Selkirk qualified to represent South Africa in the 2021 Online Olympiad. However, she declined her invitation, citing a lack of transparency and incompetent handling of the qualification process.

== Streaming and blogging ==
In late January 2020, Selkirk partnered up with South African Woman's Chess Champion, Woman International Master Jesse February, to start the HashtagChess channel on the streaming platform Twitch, which has amassed over 14,500 followers as of July 2022.

On 1 October 2021, Jesse February announced that she would be leaving HashtagChess to stream on her personal twitch account (Jesse_Feb), leaving Selkirk the sole owner of the HashtagChess channel. The split was amicable, with "different career and content creation goals" being cited as the primary reasons.

Selkirk also regularly posts blogs on the popular website chess.com under her personal account.
