= Colin Crouch (chess player) =

English chess player and author (1956–2015)

Personal information
- Born: 14 October 1956 Bushey, Hertfordshire
- Died: 16 April 2015 (aged 58) Harrow, London

Chess career
- Country: England
- Title: International Master (1991)
- Peak rating: 2448 (July 2000)

Colin Stamford Crouch (14 October 1956 – 16 April 2015) was an English chess player and author.

Crouch was educated at Haberdashers' Aske's and read Geography at Christ's College, Cambridge. He later finished a PhD at Durham University in 1989, the subject of which was the roots of unemployment in mining communities.

A highly talented junior player, he won the British Under-16 Championship in 1972 and the Under-18 Championship in 1974. He received his first international rating of 2300 in 1977, and following years of play in national and international tournaments, was awarded the International Master title in 1991. Close to Grandmaster strength, his 'finest hour' as a chess player was his score of 7/9 in the Hastings Challengers of 1991-92, which included a 'highly original win' over Valeriy Neverov. He achieved a peak rating of 2448.

Despite suffering a stroke that damaged his sight in December 2004, he continued to compete against blind, near-sighted, and sighted players. He won silver medals in both the 2008 and 2012 editions of the Chess Olympiad for the Blind.

== Bibliography ==
- Crouch, Colin (1990). Delayed Castling. Master Class Publications.
- Mednis, Edmar; Crouch, Colin (1992). Rate Your Endgame. Cadogan Chess. ISBN 9781857440201.
- Crouch, Colin (1993). Attacking Technique. Batsford. ISBN 9780713473476.
- Crouch, Colin (1994). Pawn Chains. Olbrich. ISBN 9783929324105.
- Crouch, Colin; Kulagin, Alexander (1995). Against the Maroczy Bind. Chess Digest.
- Crouch, Colin; Haines, Kean (1995). Hastings 1895: The Centenary Book. Waterthorpe Information Services. ISBN 9780952403319.
- Crouch, Colin (1998). The Queen's Gambit Declined: 5 Bf4!. Cadogan Chess. ISBN 9781857442076.
- Crouch, Colin (2000). How to Defend in Chess: Learn from the World Champions. Batsford. ISBN 9780713486841.
- Crouch, Colin (2009). Great Attackers: Learn From Kasparov, Tal And Stein. Everyman Chess. ISBN 9781857445770.
- Crouch, Colin (2009). Move by Move: A Step-By-Step Guide to Brilliant Chess. Everyman Chess. ISBN 9781857445992.
- Crouch, Colin (2010). Why We Lose at Chess. Everyman Chess. ISBN 9781857446364.
- Crouch, Colin (2011). Analyse Your Chess. Everyman Chess. ISBN 9781857446708.
- Crouch, Colin (2013). Fighting Chess: Move by Move. Everyman Chess. ISBN 9781857449938.
- Crouch, Colin (2013). Magnus Force: How Carlsen Beat Kasparov's Record. Everyman Chess. ISBN 9781781941485.
