= Sahaj Grover =

Indian chess grandmaster (born 1995)

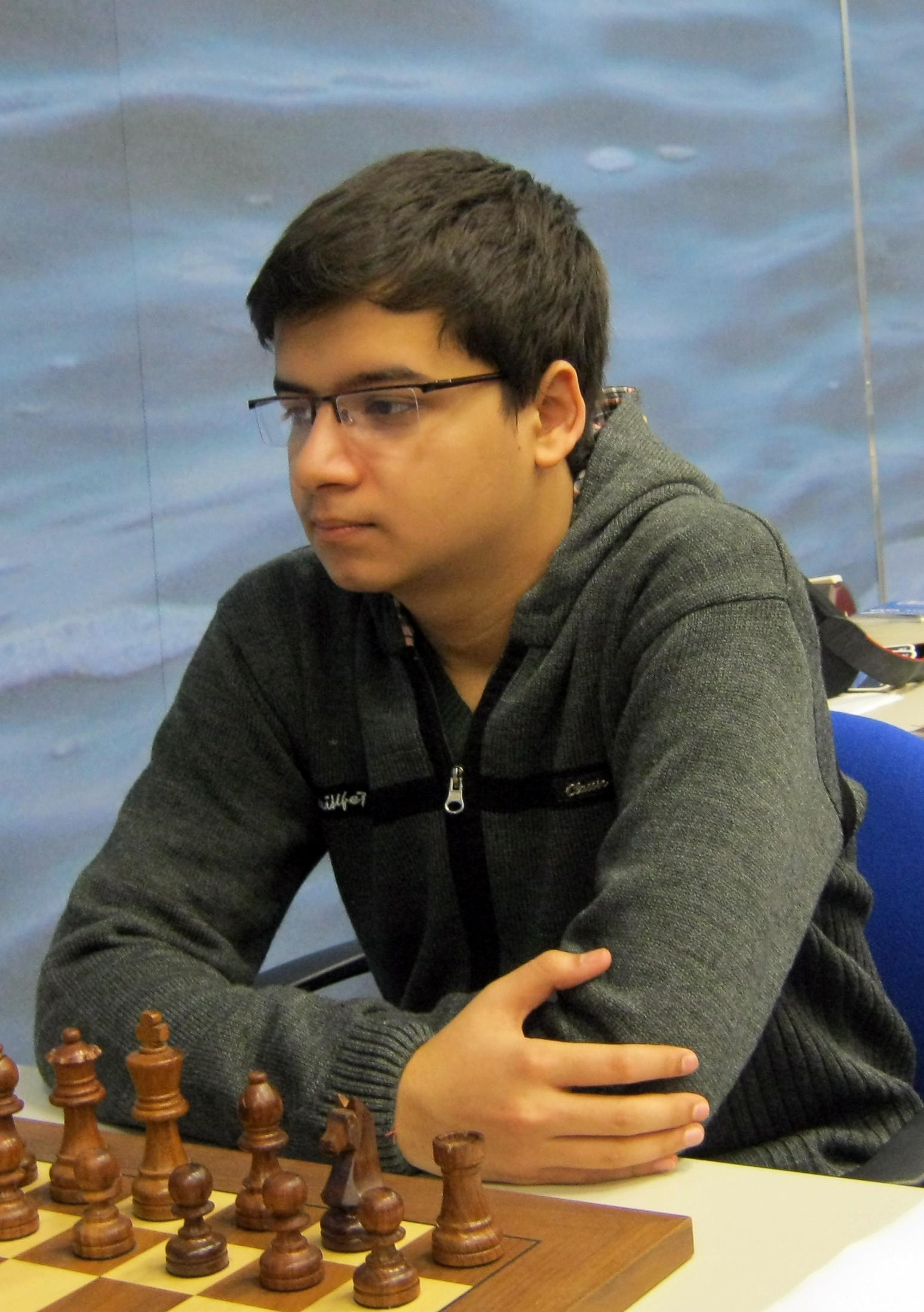
- Grover at the Tata Steel Chess Tournament, c. 2012

Personal information
- Born: 7 September 1995 (age 30) Delhi, India

Chess career
- Country: India
- Title: Grandmaster (2012)
- FIDE rating: 2493 (July 2026)
- Peak rating: 2528 (January 2015)

Sahaj Grover (born 7 September 1995) is a chess player from Delhi, India, who received the FIDE title of Grandmaster (GM) in September 2012.

He won the Under-10 World Youth Chess Championship in 2005 and came third in the Under-20 World Junior Chess Championship in 2011.

In 2018, he moved to South Africa. He won the South African Open in 2017 and 2018.
