= Charles de Villiers =

South African chess player (born 1953)

Personal information
- Born: March 25, 1953 (age 73) Cape Town, South Africa

Chess career
- Country: South Africa
- Title: FIDE Master (1998)
- Peak rating: 2350 (July 1995)

Charles de Villiers (born 1953) is a South African chess player.

He has won the South African Chess Championship six times; in 1975 (with Piet Kroon), 1977 (with David Walker), 1981, 1985 (with Clyde Wolpe), 1987 and 1989. He resides in Cape Town.
