= Kurt Dreyer =

German-South African chess player (1909–1981)

Personal information
- Born: 31 July 1909 Bielefeld, Germany
- Died: 29 September 1981 (aged 72) Johannesburg, South Africa

Chess career
- Country: South Africa

Kurt Dreyer (31 July 1909 in Bielefeld, Germany – 29 September 1981 in Johannesburg, South Africa) was a German–South African chess master and functionary.

== Early life and education ==
Kurt Dreyer was born the son of the Jewish physician Felix Dreyer (1874–1955) and his wife Johanna, née Marx (1879–1974), who served as chairwoman of the Bielefeld Jewish Women's Association; his brother Hans-Rudolf (b. 1913) became a businessman in Johannesburg. In 1927/28, Kurt attended the universities of Heidelberg and Hamburg, and from 1928 to 1930 he studied in Paris and Frankfurt am Main. A student of Hugo Sinzheimer he obtained his doctorate in law in Frankfurt in February 1933. Alongside his academic career, he was a member of the Bielefeld chess club and had won the Westphalian Championship in 1930, having initially founded and presided over the grammar school chess club.

== Emigration and life in South Africa ==
Kurt Dreyer was forced to emigrate from Germany because of the country's Nazi policies. He first went to Belgium on a student visa in September 1933, but had to return to Germany in March 1934 because he did not have a work permit. In November 1935 he managed to emigrate to South Africa, where he worked as a clerk, branch accountant, assistant manager and local secretary at head office for OK Bazaars in Johannesburg until 1956. In 1939, he did his military service in the Royal Light Infantry, although he did not become a South African citizen until 1943. He subsequently worked as an accounting manager, among others for Dreyer & Statham Pty. Ltd (from 1956 to 1968) and Orthopaedic Suppliers Pty. Ltd (from 1965) in Johannesburg.

Dreyer was South African Champion in 1937 (after a play-off) and 1947 (jointly with Wolfgang Heidenfeld). He took 15th at Dublin 1957 (zonal, Ludek Pachman won). and won the South African and Rhodesian open chess championships in 1969. Dreyer represented South Africa in Chess Olympiads at Munich 1958, Tel Aviv 1964, Havana 1966, and Siegen 1970.

In addition, Dreyer served as president of the Chess Federation for South African from 1953 to 1960, and was subsequently made honorary vice president. He also worked as South African chess correspondent for Chess Express, Deutsche Schachblätter, and Chess Magazine.

In 1939 he married Eva Dreyer, née Wolfes (b. 1918), with whom he had two children, Frank (b. 1943) and Kenneth Dreyer (b. 1945).
