= Dagur Arngrímsson =

Icelandic chess player (born 1987)

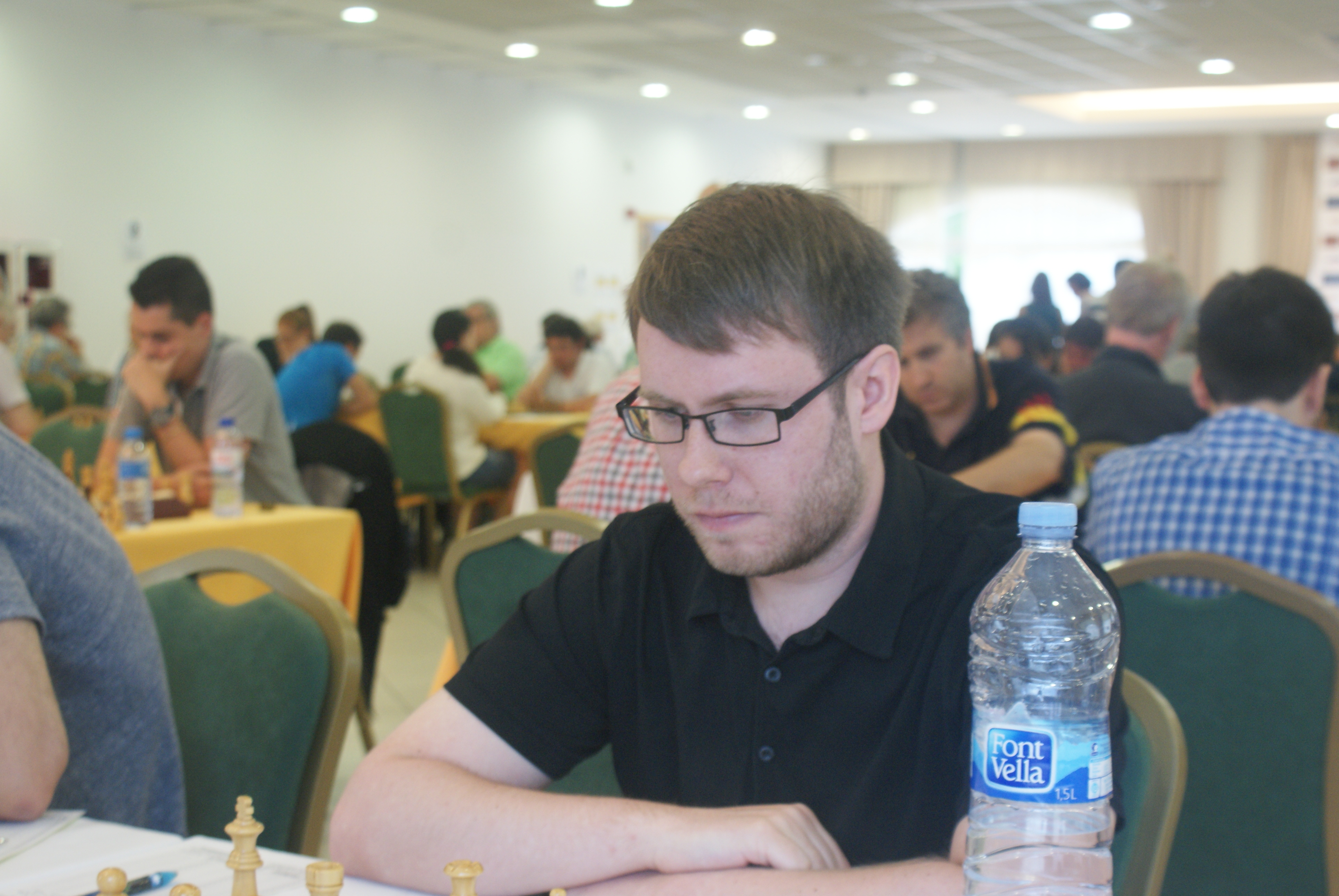

Personal information
- Born: January 14, 1987 (age 39)

Chess career
- Country: Iceland
- Title: International Master (2009)
- Peak rating: 2404 (January 2009)

Dagur Arngrímsson (born 14 January 1987) is an Icelandic chess International Master. He played for Iceland in the European Team Chess Championship of 2009.

On the November 2009 FIDE rating list, he had an Elo rating of 2375.
