= Bunmi Davies =

Nigerian television producer

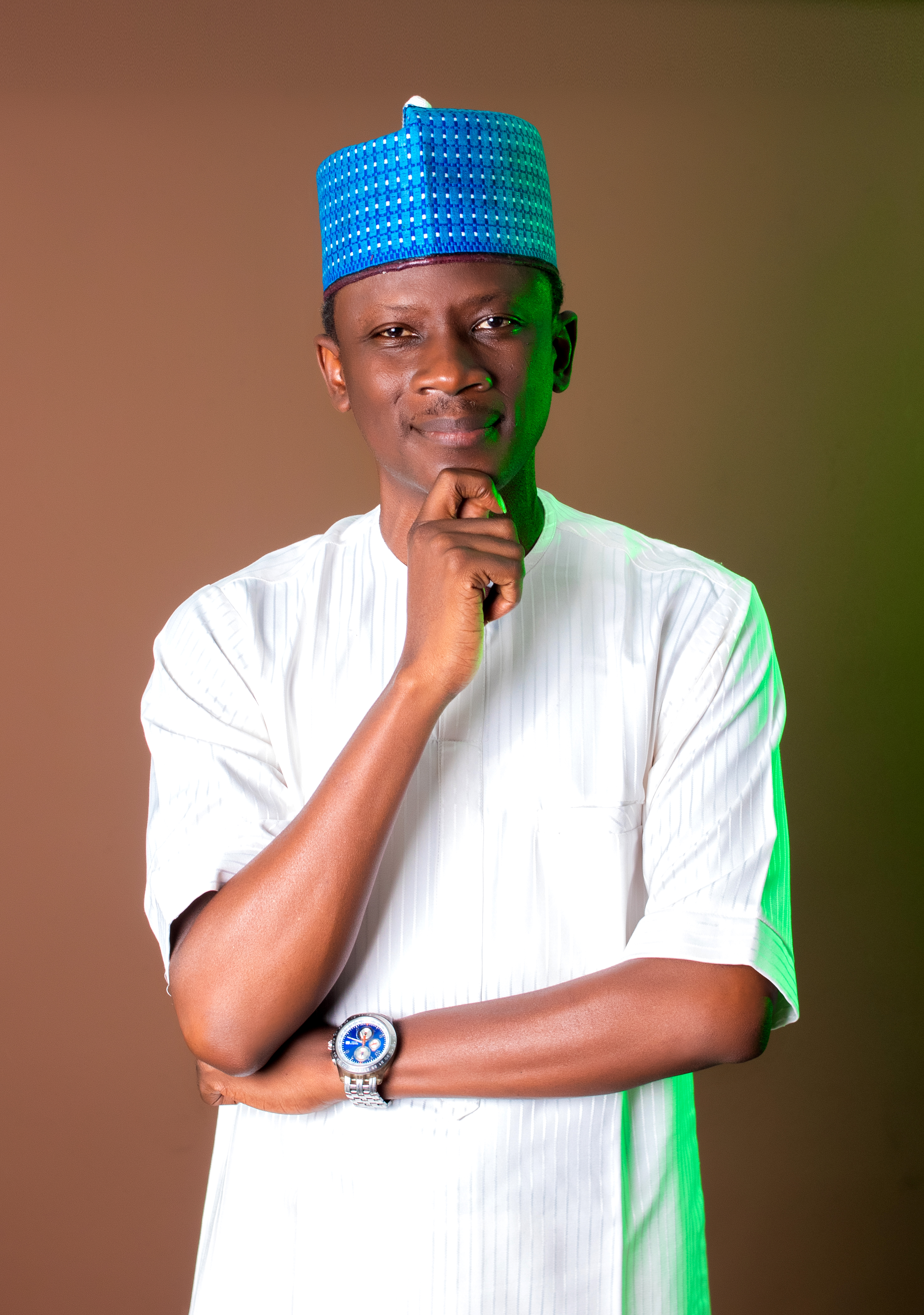
- Born: 15 September 1973 (age 52)
- Education: University of Lagos
- Occupations: Entertainment producer, Entrepreneur
- Years active: 1999–present
- Known for: Producing Standup Nigeria comedy show

Bunmi Davies (born 15 September 1973) is a Nigerian entertainment producer and entrepreneur. He is the founder and chief executive officer of Afrotainment Productions, an entertainment company best known for producing the stand-up comedy platform Stand Up Nigeria.

== Early life and education ==
Davies attended the Nigerian Navy Primary School and had his high school education at Federal Government College Ijanikin. He then studied Banking and Finance at the University of Lagos.

== Career ==
Davies began his career in the 1990s as a theater producer and then became a prominent figure in the Nigerian entertainment industry. His works include:

- Standup Nigeria: A comedy show that has become a staple in the Nigerian entertainment scene, showcasing top comedic talents in the country. Bunmi Davies is the founder, producer and director of the show.
- Alibaba's January 1 Concert: A major annual comedy event that features performances from leading comedians and musicians. Bunmi Davies has been a key figure in the production and direction of the show, contributing to its popularity.
- Spontaneity: A comedy show that focuses on unscripted, spontaneous humor, further cementing Bunmi Davies' reputation as a top producer in the industry.
- Jekaplay: A food and entertainment hub with outlets around Lagos offering a unique blend of culinary and entertainment experiences.

== Achievements and Recognition ==
Davies has received numerous accolades for his contributions to the entertainment industry, including 2011 Naija FM Comedy awards for the best comedy show in Nigeria.

== Personal life ==
Davies is married to Motunrayo Davies and they have a daughter, Azeema Davies. He is a fan of Fela Kuti's music and is passionate about Arsenal Football Club.
