= Karmen Mar =

Slovenian chess player (born 1987)

Personal information
- Born: 14 July 1987 (age 38) Maribor, SR Slovenia, SFR Yugoslavia

Chess career
- Country: Slovenia
- Title: Woman International Master (2003)
- Peak rating: 2289 (October 2002)

Karmen Mar (born 14 July 1987) is a Slovenian chess player, Woman International Master.

Results:

- the youngest Slovenian Woman International Master (WIM). The title achieved at age of 16.
- the 3rd place on the Slovenian woman championship in 2002.
- Slovenian youth champion in 1999 (G-12), in 2000 (G-14) and in 2005 (G-18)
- Slovenian youth vice-champion in 2001 (G-14) and in 2003 (G-16)
- the 14th place on the European Youth Chess Championship in 2001 (G-14)
- the 22nd place on the World Youth Chess Championship in 1999 (G-12)
- the 23rd place on the World Youth Championship in 2004 (G-18)
- the 1st place on the Mitropa Team Cup in 2005

Karmen Mar played for the Slovenian Olympic team in 35th Chess Olympiad in Bled.

Her current FIDE rating is 2271 (November 2010) and is ranked as the 4th Slovenian female chess player.
