= Martin Krämer =

German chess grandmaster (born 1987)

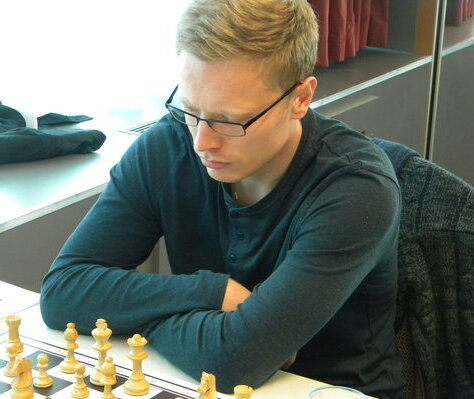
- Krämer in 2016

Personal information
- Born: 23 December 1987 (age 38) Erfurt, East Germany

Chess career
- Country: Germany
- Title: Grandmaster (2012)
- FIDE rating: 2560 (July 2026)
- Peak rating: 2587 (April 2019)

Martin Kraemer (German: Martin Krämer; born 23 December 1987) is a German chess player who received the FIDE title of Grandmaster (GM) in September 2012.

== Chess career ==
Krämer earned his International Master title in 2006 and Grandmaster title in 2012. He achieved his three Grandmaster norms in the 2009/10, 2010/11 and 2011/12 Chess Bundesliga seasons. He won the German Rapid Chess Championship in 2013.
