= A Great Day (film) =

- Directed by: James Abinibi
- Written by: James Abinibi
- Produced by: James Abinibi
- Starring: Whochay Nnadi; Kenny Solomon; Crystabel Goddy.
- Release date: 2015
- Country: Nigeria
- Language: English

A Great Day is a 2015 Nigerian short film written, produced, and directed by James Abinibi. The movie showcases the determination of the life of a job seeker and it also stars Whochay Nnadi, Kenny Solomon and Crystabel Goddy.

== Synopsis ==
The movie revolves around the sojourn of a young man who was called for an interview. During the journey, he faces different kinds of ordeals that would have made him to turn back but he was determined and keeps on going.

== Cast ==
- Whochay Nnadi
- Kenny Solomon
- Crystabel Goddy
- Emmanuel Ilemobayo
- Cute Kiman

== Premiere ==
The movie was first premiered at Film House Cinema, Leisure Mall, Adeniran Ogunsanya in Surulere, Lagos Nigeria on 27 November 2015. The premiering was attended by celebrities including Funky Mallam, Shola Animashaun, Doris Simeon, Emmanuel Ilemobayo, Bunmi Davies and others
