= Michelle Fisher =

South African chess player

Personal information
- Born: September 18, 1997 (age 28)

Chess career
- Country: South Africa
- Title: Woman FIDE Master (2017)
- Peak rating: 1801 (March 2024)

Michelle M. Fisher (born 1997) is a South African chess player who holds the title of Woman FIDE Master (WFM, 2017).

== Career ==
Fisher earned the title of Woman FIDE Master in 2017. She has represented South Africa in the Women's Chess Olympiad of 2014, 2016 and 2018 on board five, four and three respectively.
