= Kareim Wageih =

Egyptian chess player (born 1992)

Personal information
- Born: 1992 (age 33–34)

Chess career
- Country: Egypt
- Title: International Master (2008)
- Peak rating: 2433 (October 2020)

Kareim Wageih (born 1992) is an Egyptian International Master. He participated in the Chess World Cup 2023 where he was knocked out by Markus Ragger in the first round with a 2½-1½ loss.
