= Amon Simutowe =

Zambian chess grandmaster (born 1982)

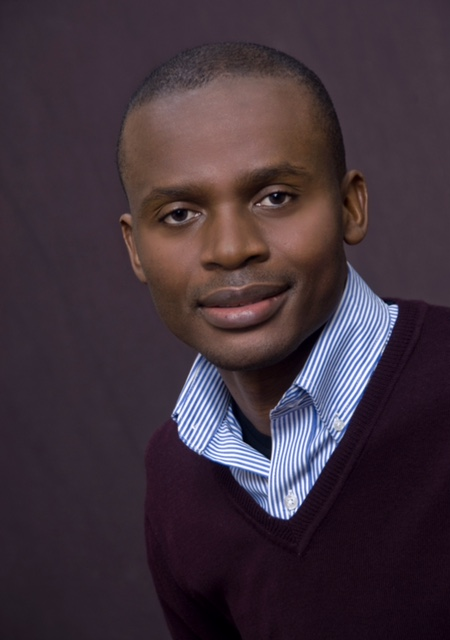
- Amon Simutowe, Warsaw 2013

Personal information
- Born: January 6, 1982 (age 44) Mbala, Zambia

Chess career
- Country: Zambia
- Title: Grandmaster (2009)
- FIDE rating: 2449 (July 2026)
- Peak rating: 2486 (April 2009)

Amon Simutowe (born January 6, 1982) is a Zambian chess grandmaster. He is the first grandmaster from sub-Saharan Africa and the third black chess grandmaster in history, after Maurice Ashley and Pontus Carlsson. He holds a Bachelor of Science in Economics and Finance from the University of Texas at Dallas and a Master of Science in Economics for Development from the University of Oxford.

== Childhood and early career ==
Amon's mother died before his second birthday. While growing up Simutowe played football. He had originally set his dreams on being a striker for the Zambian national football team after playing at the youth level.

He was introduced to chess by his brother Solomon at the age of ten. After two months, his interest shifted completely to chess and he played against his brother every day. At first his father was concerned about Amon spending too much time playing chess as he imagined it would distract him from his academic interests. Simutowe's brother saw a healthy appetite growing in his younger brother and sent him chess books and magazines.

He would later state in an interview on why he chose chess over football: "I didn't have anyone to blame in chess for my losses and I didn't have to wait until I was 18 to compete nationally." Simutowe won his first tournament at age 12. In 1994 he entered his first of three local tournaments. "I really didn't do very well, but was praised as the best young player… under 16", said Simutowe.

== International Master to Grandmaster ==
In 1995 Simutowe won the nation's under-21 championship and took fifth place at the African Junior Championship. In 1996 he won the Zambian Chess Championship as well as the Zambian Junior National Championship. When reflecting upon his results in 1996, Amon stated "I didn't expect to win this tournament... I was just interested in qualifying for the Olympiad." He qualified but the Zambian National team was unable to compete in the Olympiads. In 1997 Simutowe won the African Junior Chess Championship.

He earned the IM title at the 1998 African Zonal (zone 4.3) with the required 66% score and later went on to win the first of his two African Junior Championships in 1999 by 12/13 followed by an 11/11 score in 2000 during which he earned the moniker, "The Zambezi Shark" and became famous for repeatedly defeating his competition in Fischer-like fashion, winning tournaments by large margins. He also carried the Zambian flag abroad in the 2000 under-16 championship and beat Iran's Ehsan Ghaem Maghami who would later become a Grandmaster.

He then scored several notable tournament victories, including a tie for second place at the 2000 World Junior Chess Championships in Armenia where he scored 8½/13. He scored 6½/11 in the British Championship including a beautiful win against IM Colin Crouch. He represented Zambia at the 2000 Chess Olympiad in Istanbul, Turkey and scored 8/10 on board one. For his effort, he earned a silver medal, two GM norms (2000 Olympiad, 2000 African Championships) toward the three to become an International Grandmaster and was named Zambia's "Sportsman of the Year" in 2001.

In 2002, he moved to the United States to pursue higher education after being awarded a chess scholarship. While a student at UTD, he helped the chess team win two national collegiate championships.

After earning a degree in finance and economics with high honours in December 2006, he embarked on a path to earn his final Grandmaster norm. After playing a number of tournaments in the U.S., he travelled to the Netherlands to compete in the 2007 Euwe Stimulans tournament, where he earned his third GM norm, and was awarded the International Grandmaster title.

In 2009, he won the South African Open.
