= Esperança Caxita =

Angolan chess player (born 1999)

Esperanca Caxita
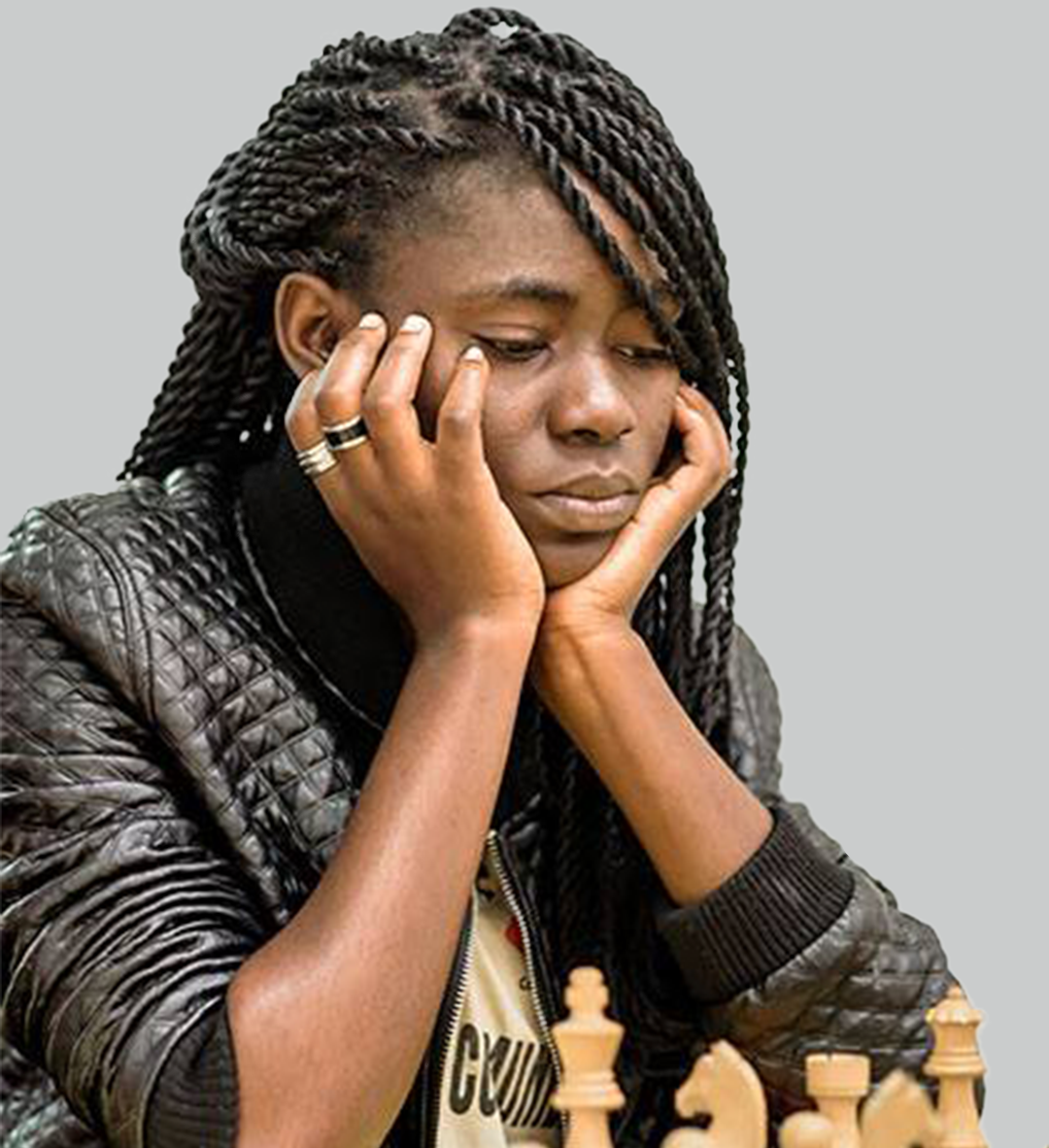

Personal information
- Born: April 14, 1999 (age 27) Cafunfo, Lunda Norte

Chess career
- Country: Angola
- Title: Woman International Master (2014)
- Peak rating: 2000 (February 2026)

Esperanca Caxita (born 1999) is an Angolan chess player who holds the title of Woman International Master, which she earned in 2014.

== Chess career ==
The daughter of a domestic worker, Caxita left her parents in Cafunfo to stay with her aunt in Luanda at age 9, and first started playing chess at age 11.

She won the African Junior Chess Championship in 2013, 2014 and 2016, as well as the Madagascar zonal championship in 2018 and 2019.

Caxita has represented Angola in multiple Chess Olympiads, the first in 2014 at the 41st Chess Olympiad, where she finished on 4/11 on board 1, as well as the 42nd Chess Olympiad (6/10 on board 1), the 43rd Chess Olympiad (3/10 on board 1), the 44th Chess Olympiad (5/10 on board 1), and in the 45th Chess Olympiad finishing on 7/10 on board two.

Caxita qualified for the Women's Chess World Cup 2025, where she was defeated by Bella Khotenashvili in the first round.
