= Donovan van den Heever =

South African chess player

Personal information
- Born: February 22, 1981 (age 45)

Chess career
- Country: South Africa
- Title: International Master (2014)
- Peak rating: 2301 (November 2010)

Donovan van den Heever (born 22 February 1981) is a South African chess player. He became an International Master in 2014, won the South African Chess Championship in the same year and has represented South Africa at the Chess Olympiad, including 2006, 2010, 2014, 2016 and 2018.
