= Andrew Kayonde =

Zambian chess player (born 1988)

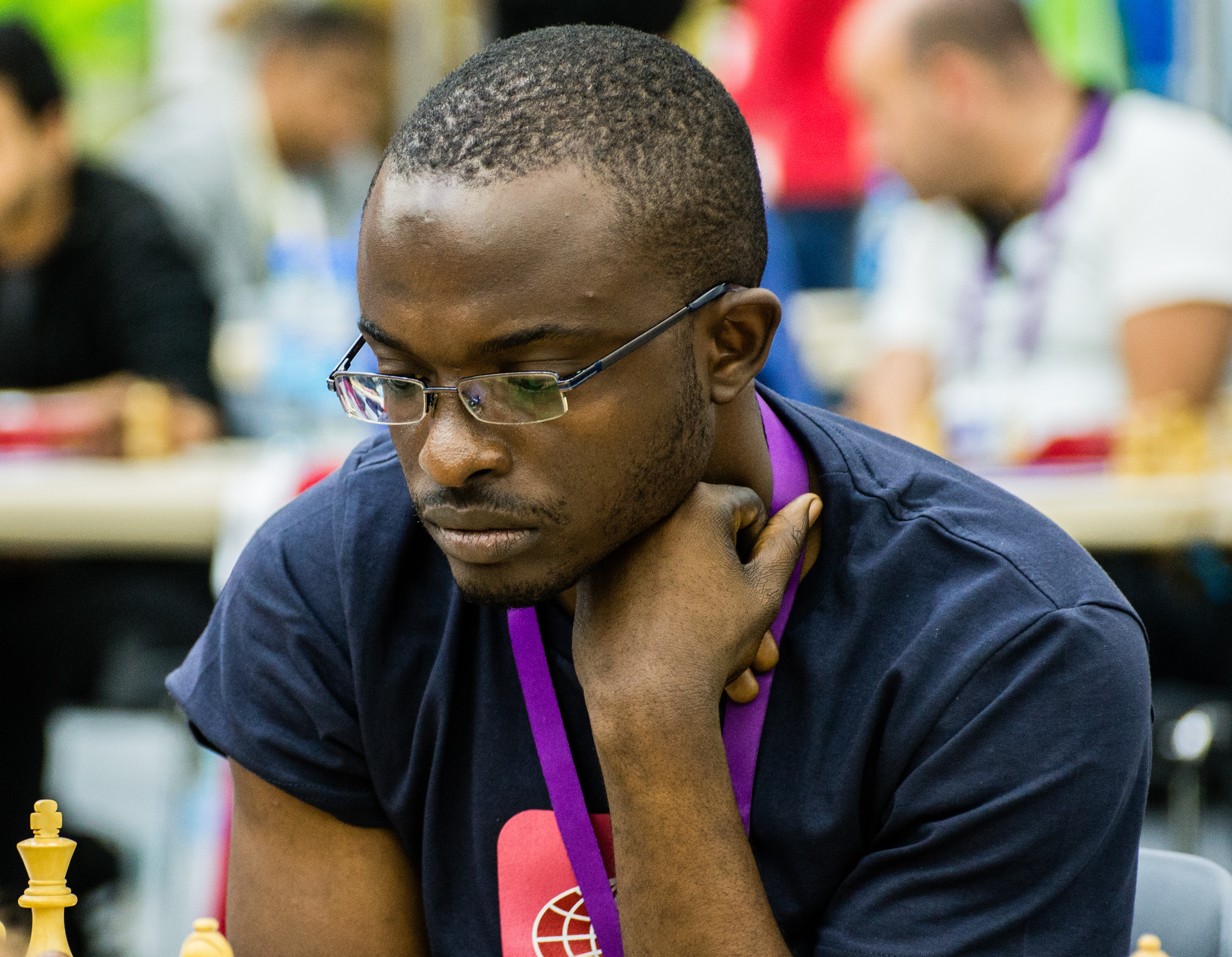

Personal information
- Born: October 28, 1988 (age 37)

Chess career
- Country: Zambia
- Title: International Master (2016)
- Peak rating: 2422 (August 2016)

Andrew Kayonde is a Zambian chess player. He was awarded the title of International Master in 2016.

== Chess career ==
Kayonde won the Zambian Chess Championship six times in 2009, 2014, 2015, 2016, 2017 and 2018.

He competed for Zambia in the 2018 Chess Olympiad, where he managed to draw against Vasyl Ivanchuk in the first round, who was rated over 300 points higher.

== Personal life ==
Outside of chess, Kayonde obtained a master's degree in business administration from Heriot-Watt University and works as an accountant.
