= Nicholas van der Nat =

South African chess player (born 1979)

Personal information
- Born: 1 October 1979 (age 46) Kimberley, Northern Cape, South Africa

Chess career
- Country: South Africa
- Title: FIDE Master
- FIDE rating: 2362 (January 2017)
- Peak rating: 2366 (October 2013)

Nicholas van der Nat is a South African chess player.

He has the titles of FIDE Master and FIDE Trainer. He has won the South African Closed Chess Championships three times, in 2000, 2005, and 2009, and was the best South African participant in the South African Open in 2009 and 2011. He coaches chess on a full-time basis. He has started and currently runs Chess Excellence, a Chess coaching and competition organisation based in Johannesburg.
