= Rodwell Makoto =

Zimbabwean chess player (born 1987)

Personal information
- Born: August 2, 1987 (age 38)

Chess career
- Country: Zimbabwe
- Title: International Master (2013)
- Peak rating: 2406 (September 2015)

Rodwell Makoto (born 1987) is a Zimbabwean chess International Master.

== Career ==
He won the South African Open in 2012 and has featured for Zimbabwe in their Olympiad team. He became an International Master in 2013. With an Elo rating of 2403 in June 2015, Makoto became Zimbabwe's second highest rated International Master after Robert Gwaze, who was rated at 2422 at the time.

He qualified for the Chess World Cup 2021, where he was defeated by Vladislav Kovalev in the first round.

He won the CBZ Chess World Cup Qualifier to again qualify for the Chess World Cup 2023, where he was defeated by Nijat Abasov in the first round.
