= Jesse February =

South African chess player (born 1997)

Personal information
- Born: Jesse Nikki February; January 28, 1997 (age 29) Port Elizabeth, South Africa

Chess career
- Country: South Africa
- Title: Woman International Master (2016)
- Peak rating: 2052 (November 2024)

Jesse February (born 1997) is a South African chess player who holds the title of Woman International Master (WIM, 2016). She is a two-time South African women's chess champion and has also won the African women's chess championship twice, in 2021 and 2024.

== Chess career ==
February earned the title of Woman FIDE Master in 2015, and Woman International Master in 2016. She has represented South Africa in the Women's Chess Olympiad of 2016 (scoring 4/9 on board three), 2018 (6.5/10 on board one), 2022 (2/7 on board one). and 2024 (6/10 on board one).

In 2015, she was crowned U18 girls champion at the South Africa junior closed chess championships, and was selected to play for the national team for the World Youth Chess Championships in Greece that October.

In 2015, she also came first in the University Sport South Africa closed chess championships at Wits University in Johannesburg, and was invited to participate in the World University Chess Championships in Hungary. In 2017 and 2019, she won the Women's section of the South African Chess Championship.

In May 2021, February participated in the Women's African Individual Championship, winning the event with a score of 7/9. With this victory, February is eligible to be awarded the title of Woman Grandmaster, provided she attains a rating of 2100.

She qualified for the Women's Chess World Cup 2021 held in July, where she was defeated by GM Valentina Gunina 1.5-0.5 in the first round.

February qualified to represent South Africa in the FIDE Online Chess Olympiad 2021 where she faced 8 opponents with an average rating exceeding 2000. She finished the event on 2/8(+2=0-6)

She qualified for the Women's Grand Swiss 2021 and scored 0.5/11 for a performance rating of 1976. She went on to win the Nelson Mandela Bay Closed tournament in December 2021 with a perfect score of 4/4.

February participated in the 2022 South African Women's Chess Championship and finished in second place with a score of 4.5/6, half a point behind Chloe Badenhorst who was crowned the new South African Women's Champion

February won the African women's chess championship for the second time in 2024.

February won the women's section of the South African Chess Championship for the third time in 2024.

== Streaming ==
In late January 2020, February partnered up with Woman Candidate Master, Rebecca Selkirk to start the HashtagChess channel on the streaming platform Twitch which has amassed a following of over ten thousand as of 2021.

On 1 October 2021, February announced that she would be leaving HashtagChess, making Selkirk the sole owner of the channel, to start streaming on her personal Twitch account (Jesse_Feb). The split was amicable with "different career and content creation goals" being cited as the primary reasons.

February streamed and conducted interviews with the players during the 2024 Cape Town Chess Masters, an event described as having "raised the standard of chess broadcasting in South Africa".

== Coaching ==
February also works as a professional chess coach in the chess training platform, Cochess, where she offers private chess lessons.
