= South African Open (chess) =

The South African Open is a chess tournament played in South Africa. It was first held in 1962.

== History ==
First held in 1962, the SA Open was held every two years until 1995, after which it has been held annually. It was not held in 1992 due to the unification of the various sports bodies after apartheid.

== Open winners ==
South African Open
| Year | Venue | Winner | Score | Players | Best South African player |
|---|---|---|---|---|---|
| 2026 | Cape Town | Charlton Mnyasta | 7/9 | 45 | Charlton Mnyasta |
| 2025 | Johannesburg | James Dinham | 8.5/11 | 47 | James Dinham |
| 2024 | Durban | Khanya Mazibuko | 8.5/11 | 78 | Khanya Mazibuko |
| 2022 | Cape Town | Daniel Cawdery | 9/11 | 96 | Daniel Cawdery |
| 2019 | Kimberley | Johannes Mabusela | 7½/9 | 69 | Johannes Mabusela |
| 2018 | Bloemfontein | Sahaj Grover | 10/11 | | Daniel Cawdery |
| 2017 | Durban | Sahaj Grover | 10/11 | 125 | Watu Kobese |
| 2016 | Cape Town | Aleksa Striković | 9½/11 | 548 | Watu Kobese |
| 2015 | Cape Town | Nigel Short | 9/11 | ? | Kenny Solomon |
| 2014 | Bloemfontein | Merab Gagunashvili | 10/11 | ? | Johannes Mabusela |
| 2013 | Port Elizabeth | Abhijeet Gupta | 9/11 | ? | Watu Kobese |
| 2012 | Cape Town | Rodwell Makoto | 9/11 | 326 | Johannes Mabusela |
| 2011 | Johannesburg | Gawain Jones | 9½/11 | 388 | Nicholas van der Nat |
| 2010 | Johannesburg | Robert Gwaze | 7½/9 | 206 | Kgaugelo Mosetlhe |
| 2009 | Cape Town | Amon Simutowe | 9½/11 | 204 | Nicholas van der Nat |
| 2008 | Centurion | Watu Kobese | 9½/11 | 159 | Watu Kobese |
| 2007 | Cape Town | Kenny Solomon | 9½/11 | 159 | Kenny Solomon |
| 2006 | Port Elizabeth | Gawain Jones | 10½/11 | 155 | Watu Kobese |
| 2005 | Bloemfontein | Kenny Solomon | 9½/11 | 191 | Kenny Solomon |
| 2004 | Cape Town | Watu Kobese | 10/11 | 263 | Watu Kobese |
| 2003 | Centurion | Stanley Chumfwa | 10½/11 | 173 | Kenny Solomon |
| 2002 | Port Elizabeth | Ronnie van Tonder | 9/11 | 181 | Ronnie van Tonder |
| 2001 | Cape Town | Mark Levitt | 9½ | ? | Mark Levitt |
| 2000 | Alberton | Amon Simutowe | 10½/11 | 89 | Andre Nel |
| 1999 | Cape Town | Kenny Solomon | ?/11 | ? | Kenny Solomon |
| 1998 | Pretoria | Amon Simutowe | ? | ? | Mark Rubery |
| 1997 | Cape Town | Gordon Meyer | 9½/11 | >300 | Gordon Meyer |
| 1996 | Durban | Mark Levitt & Solly Mauba | | | Mark Levitt |
| 1995 | Durban | Gavin Wall & Mark Levitt | | | Mark Levitt |
| 1993 | Durban | George Michelakis & Malcolm Pein | | | George Michelakis |
| 1990 | Johannesburg | James Plaskett | | | Shabier Bhawoodien |
| 1988 | Port Elizabeth | David Gluckman | | | David Gluckman |
| 1986 | Johannesburg | Mark Levitt | | | Mark Levitt |
| 1984 | Durban | Michael Stean | | | Mark Rubery |
| 1982 | Johannesburg | David Sprenkle & Albert Ponelis | | | Albert Ponelis |
| 1980 | Port Elizabeth | Yair Kraidman & Charles de Villiers | | | Charles de Villiers |
| 1978 | Durban | Craig Pritchett | | | Peter Abbott |
| 1976 | aurthurs seat hotel, sea point. cape town | Miguel Najdorf and Michael Stean | ? | ? | ? |
| 1974 | Durban (the 7th S A Open) | Albert Ponelis and Eddie Price | 9/11 | 154 | Albert Ponelis and Eddie Price |
| 1972 | Port Elizabeth | Bob Griffiths | 10/11 | 42 | Bob Griffiths |
| 1970 | East London | Brian Donnelly | | | Brian Donnelly |
| 1968 | Cape Town | Kurt Dreyer | | | Kurt Dreyer |
| 1966 | Durban | Bob Griffiths | | | Bob Griffiths |
| 1964 | Wilderness | Lothar Schmid | 11/11 | ? | Melvin Hope |
| 1962 | Wilderness | Harry Golombek & Alberic O'Kelly | ? | ? | JJ Leicher |

== Ladies winners ==
South African Open
| Year | Venue | Winner | Score | Players | Best South African player |
|---|---|---|---|---|---|
| 2026 | Cape Town | Joya Imkhita | 8/9 | 20 | Joya Imkhita |
| 2025 | Johannesburg | Sizakele Masango | 9.5/11 | 44 | Sizakele Masango |
