= Henry Robert Steel =

South African chess player (born 1989)

Personal information
- Born: 10 July 1989 (age 37)

Chess career
- Country: South Africa
- Title: International Master (2014)
- FIDE rating: 2408 (October 2026)
- Peak rating: 2420 (April 2018)

Henry Robert Steel (born 10 July 1989) is a South African chess player. He was awarded the title International Master by FIDE in 2014. He has won the South African Chess Championship twice, in 2007 and 2011 (jointly with Watu Kobese).

Steel played for the South African national team at the Chess Olympiads of 2008, 2010, 2012 and 2014, and at the All-Africa Games in 2007 and 2011, winning the team silver medal both times. In 2011 he also won an individual silver playing the top board.

He tied for 2nd–3rd place with Essam El Gindy in the 2011 African Chess Championship, taking third place on tie-break. This result qualified him for the FIDE World Cup, held later that year. Here he was knocked out by Vassily Ivanchuk in the first round.
