= Julius Finn =

American chess player

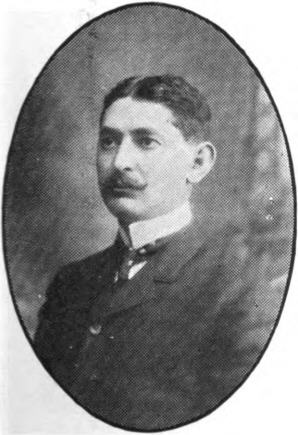
Julius Finn

Julius Finn (28 April 1871 – 6 December 1931) was an American chess master. Born into a Jewish family in Władysławow, Lithuania (then Russia), he moved to New York City in 1887. Beginning his career as a street hustler on the Lower East Side, Finn became New York's champion chess master and one of the country's prominent blindfold chess entertainers. Finn's success has been described as contributing to the rise of the New York chess scene in the early 20th century.

Finn's first tournament in America was a Handicap Tournament played in New York's Café Boulevard in 1895 where he was ranked as a 2nd class player at the beginning of the competition. He took home the 1st prize ahead of William Ewart Napier, Hermann Helms, and other players from the local scene. In July 1897, Finn led a consultation team to victory against Wilhelm Steinitz at the Metropolitan Chess Club. He won the New York State Championship three times (1901, 1907, 1908), and won the Rice Gambit tournament at the Manhattan Chess Club in 1903.

Finn acted as referee at the World Chess Championship 1921 which was played between Emanuel Lasker and José Raúl Capablanca in Havana, Cuba. He was one of the organizers of the New York 1924 chess tournament and the president of the 1927 New York Tournament. He also served as adjudicator for the college chess league with which Columbia, Harvard, Yale and Princeton were affiliated. He had been a member of the Manhattan Chess Club and Rutgers Club for many years.
