= Daniel Cawdery =

South African chess player (born 1982)

Personal information
- Born: July 20, 1982 (age 43)

Chess career
- Country: South Africa
- Title: International Master (2014)
- FIDE rating: 2388 (June 2023)
- Peak rating: 2449 (August 2017)

Daniel Cawdery is a South African chess player who was awarded the International Master title by FIDE in 2014 (Candidate Master title in 2008 and FIDE Master title in 2013).

He won the 2015 and 2022 South African Chess Championship, and has played for the South African Chess Olympiad team in 1998, 2006, 2008, 2012, 2016, 2018 and 2022.

Cawdery qualified for the 2017 Chess World Cup where he was defeated by eventual winner Levon Aronian in the first round. He also played in the Chess World Cup 2023, where he was defeated by Cristobal Henriquez Villagra in the first round.

== See also ==
- Chess in South Africa
