= Richmond Phiri =

Zambian chess International Master

Personal information
- Born: March 15, 1988 (age 38)

Chess career
- Country: Zambia
- Title: International Master (2015)
- Peak rating: 2351 (September 2022)

Richmond Phiri is a Zambian chess International Master.

== Chess career ==
He has represented his country in a number of chess olympiads, including 2006 and 2014, and won the Zambian Chess Championship in 2008 and 2014.

He played in the Chess World Cup 2015, being defeated by Hikaru Nakamura in the first round.
