= Kenny Solomon =

South African chess grandmaster (born 1979)

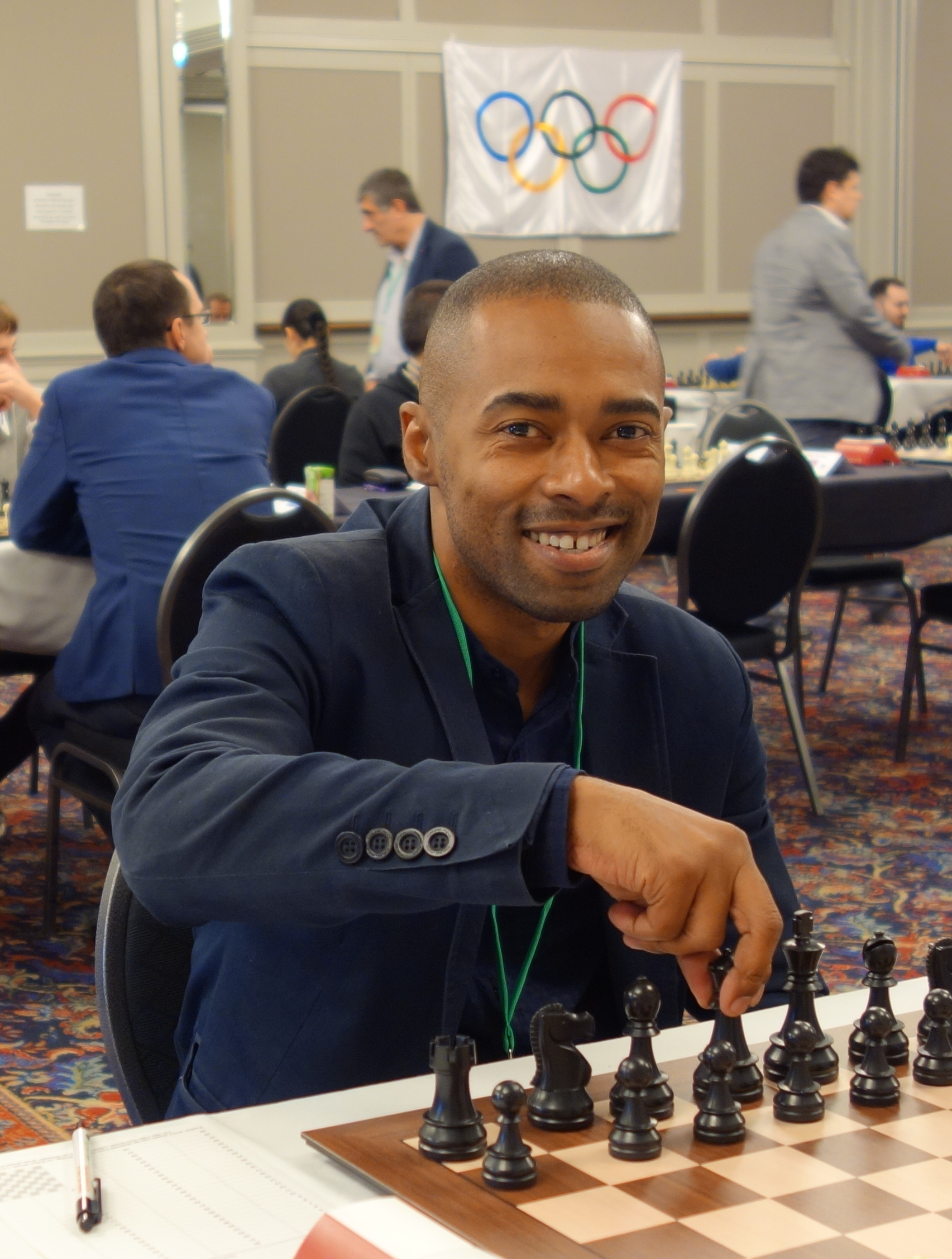
- Kenny Solomon, 2019

Personal information
- Born: Kenneth Terence Solomon; 8 October 1979 (age 46) Mitchells Plain, Cape Town, South Africa

Chess career
- Country: South Africa
- Title: Grandmaster (2015)
- Peak rating: 2461 (January 2012)

Kenneth Terence Solomon (born 8 October 1979) is a South African chess Grandmaster. He is the first and currently the only Grandmaster South Africa has ever produced.

== Career ==
He took up chess at the age of 13, inspired by his elder brother's qualification for the 1992 Chess Olympiad in Manila. Borrowing a chess book from his brother to study, Solomon was soon taken under his brother's wing to study and within two years, he was the South African Under-16 champion.

Solomon won the South African Championship in 2003 and the South African Open three times, in 1999, 2005 and 2007, and was also the top ranked South African player in 2003. He became an International Master in 2004. During the 40th Chess Olympiad in Istanbul Solomon earned his final GM norm.

Although Solomon has never reached the rating of 2500 that is usually required for the Grandmaster title, a special FIDE rule allows winners of continental championships to earn the title regardless of rating, and he did so by winning the African Chess Championship in December 2014. This achievement made him the first chess grandmaster from South Africa, the second grandmaster from sub-Saharian Africa after Amon Simutowe of Zambia, and the first grandmaster of Coloured ethnicity.

He qualified for the 2017 Chess World Cup where he was defeated by Fabiano Caruana in the first round.

== Acting ==
Solomon appeared in the 2015 short film A Great Day, directed by James Abinibi.

== See also ==
- Chess in South Africa
