= Watu Kobese =

South African chess player (born 1973)

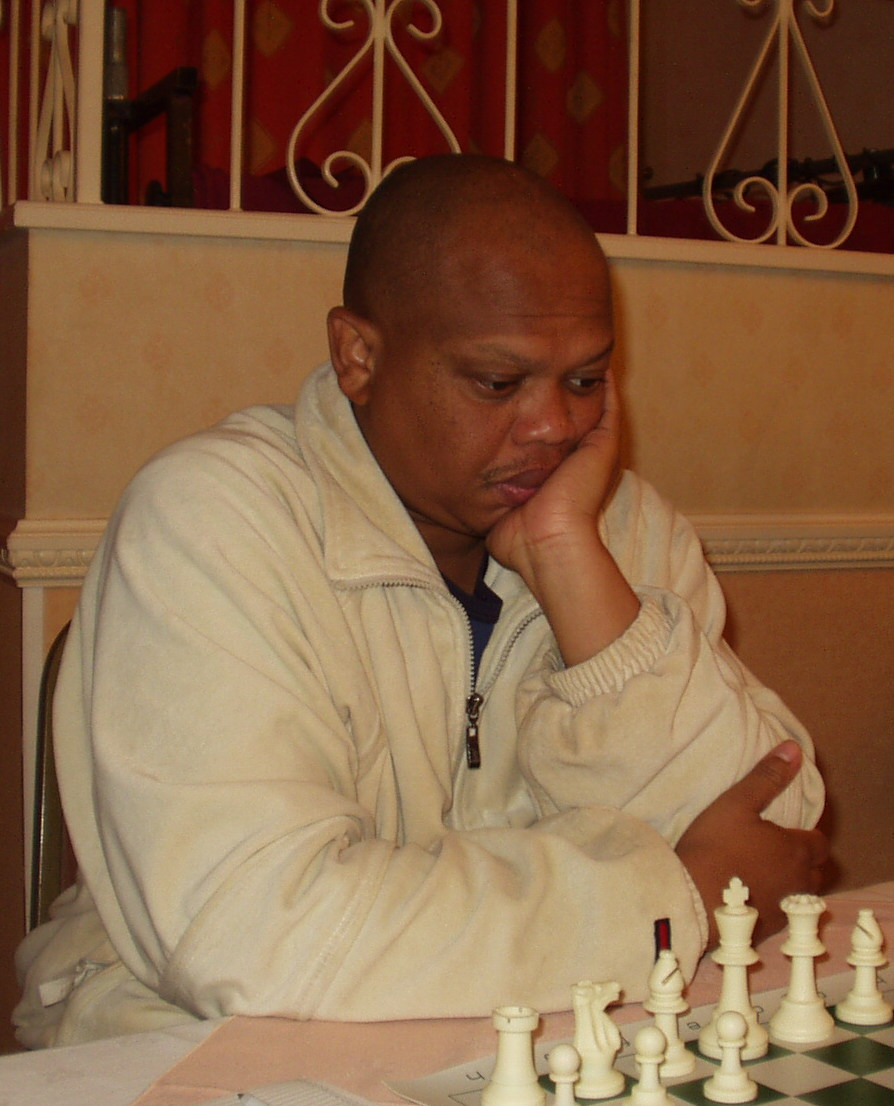

Personal information
- Born: 27 June 1973 (age 53)

Chess career
- Country: South Africa
- Title: International Master (1995)
- Peak rating: 2419 (January 2005)

Watu Kobese (born 27 June 1973) is a South African chess International Master and FIDE Trainer (2005).

He has won the South African Closed Championship three times, in 1998, 2003 and 2011, and the South African Open twice, in 2004 and 2008. Kobese was awarded by FIDE the title of International Master (IM) in 1995. He played for South Africa in the Chess Olympiads of 1992, 1994, 1996, 1998, 2004, 2006, 2008, 2010, 2012, 2014, 2016 and 2018

Kobese is the author of Masidlale Uthimba, the first Xhosa chess book, published in July 2015 and translated from a version he wrote in Zulu nine years before.
