= Melissa Greeff =

South African chess player (born 1994)

Personal information
- Born: 15 April 1994 (age 32) Cape Town, South Africa

Chess career
- Country: South Africa
- Title: Woman Grandmaster (2009)
- Peak rating: 2126 (February 2013)

Melissa Greeff (born 15 April 1994) is a South African-Canadian chess Woman Grandmaster (WGM). She earned the WGM title in 2009.

== Biography ==
In 2007, in Windhoek, Melissa ranked 5th in the African Women's Chess Championship. In 2009, she played for South Africa in the World Girls' Junior Chess Championship and ranked 35th place. Later on in the same year, she won the African Women's Chess Championship in Tripoli. In 2010, she participated in the Women's World Chess Championship by knock-out system and in the first round lost to Humpy Koneru. In 2011, in Maputo, she ranked 4th in African Women's Chess Championship.

Melissa Greeff played for South Africa:

- in the Women's Chess Olympiad participated 3 times (2008-2012);
- in the All-Africa Games chess tournament participated in 2007 and won team silver medal.

In 2007, she was awarded the FIDE Woman International Master (WIM) title and then received the FIDE Woman Grandmaster (WGM) title two years later.

In 2011, she became a FIDE Instructor.

Since 2014, she has rarely played in chess tournaments. Melissa moved to Canada where she studied robotics and engineering at the University of Toronto. She had worked with Angela Schoellig on vision-based path-following controllers for UAVs during GPS-denied flight. She has since worked on several other aspects of robotics, engineering, and mathematics. Since 2019, she teaches first-year linear algebra at the University of Toronto.
