= Anzel Solomons =

South African chess player (born 1978)

Anzel (Solomons) Laubscher
Personal information
- Born: 6 January 1978 (age 48)

Chess career
- Country: South Africa
- Title: Woman International Master (2003)
- Peak rating: 1954 (September 2009)

Anzel Solomons (née Laubscher, born 6 January 1978) is a South African chess player. She received the FIDE title of Woman International Master (WIM) in 2003.

== Career ==
She was awarded the title of Woman International Master for her victory in the FIDE Africa zone tournament in Botswana. In 2007, in Windhoek, Anzel Solomons won a silver medal in the African Women's Chess Championship. In 2008, in Nalchik Anzel Solomons participated in the Women's World Chess Championship, where she lost in the first round to Xu Yuhua. In 2011, she finished 2nd in the women's international Swiss-system tournament in Luanda. In 2014, Anzel Solomons won her second silver medal in the African Women's Chess Championship.

She has played for South Africa at seven Women's Chess Olympiads (1998, 2006—2016) and at the World Women's Team Chess Championship in 2011. Anzel Solomons has participated twice in the Women's Chess Team tournament in the African Games (2007–2011), and won the silver medal in 2007, and bronze in 2011 in the team competition, and in the individual competition she won the bronze in 2011.
