= Denise Frick =

South African chess player (born 1980)

Personal information
- Born: 26 November 1980 (age 45)

Chess career
- Country: South Africa
- Title: Woman International Master (2004)
- FIDE rating: 1770 (October 2019)
- Peak rating: 1941 (July 2006)

Denise Bouah (born 26 November 1980), formerly known as Denise Frick, is a South African chess player who holds the title of Woman International Master.

== Biography ==
In 2003 Denise Frick became a Woman FIDE master (WFM), and in 2004 she received the title of Woman International master (WIM). In 2005, in Cape Town she won the Republic of South Africa Women's Chess Championship, and in Lusaka won a bronze medal in the African Women's Chess Championship. In 2011, in Maputo, she won a bronze medal (her second medal) in the African Women's Chess Championship. In 2012, in Khanty-Mansiysk she made her debut at the Women's World Chess Championship, where she lost in the first round to Humpy Koneru. In 2014 in Windhoek, she won in the FIDE zonal tournament of Africa.

She has represented South Africa in multiple Women's Chess Olympiads, including 2000, 2004, 2006, 2012, 2014, 2016, 2018) and 2022 and at the World Women's Team Chess Championship in 2011. She has participated three times in the Women's Chess Team tournament in the African Games (2003-2011), where she won two silvers (2003, 2007) and a bronze (2011) medal in the team competition, and in the individual competition she won the silver (2011) medal.

Frick is a psychologist by education. Her master's degree work a concerned the use of chess as a therapeutic tool for assisting in the treatment of substance abuse.
