= Cecile van der Merwe =

South African chess player (born 1987)

Personal information
- Born: 16 April 1987 (age 39)

Chess career
- Country: South Africa
- Title: Woman International Master (2004)
- Peak rating: 2087 (January 2005)

Cecile Henriette van der Merwe (born 16 April 1987) is a South African chess player and Woman International Master (WIM, 2004).

== Biography ==
In 2001, in Cairo she finished 4th in the African Women's Chess Championship. In 2003, in Abuja, she finished 2nd in the African Women's Chess Championship. In 2003, she played for South Africa in the World Girls' Junior Chess Championship and finished in 16th place. In 2004, Cecile van der Merwe participated in the Women's World Chess Championship by knock-out system and lost in the first round to Humpy Koneru.

Cecile van der Merwe has played for South Africa in the following events:

- Women's Chess Olympiad - participated 4 times (2000-2004, 2012);
- Women's World Team Chess Championship - participated in 2011;
- All-Africa Games chess tournament - participated in 2003 and won the team silver medal and individual gold medal.

In 2004, she was awarded the FIDE International Women Master title.
