= Chess at the 2003 All-Africa Games =

The chess events at the 2003 All-Africa Games were held from 5 to 17 October at the Nicon Hilton Hotel in Abuja. This was the first time chess was contested at the All-Africa Games. The four events were men's and women's team competitions at rapid time controls (all moves in 25 minutes plus 10 seconds increment per move), and men's and women's individual competitions at blitz time controls (all moves in five minutes plus 3 seconds increment per move). Teams played matches on four boards: each team consisted of a minimum of four players and up to two optional reserve players. In the team competitions, medals were awarded to the teams scoring the highest number of board points, as well as to individual players with the best performances on each board in terms of win percentage.

Eleven men's teams played a round-robin tournament held from 5 to 15 October. Sierra Leone registered a twelfth team but withdrew for not having enough players. Egypt won the team gold medal scoring 31½ board points despite losing their match against Algeria, who scored 28½ board points to win the team silver medal. Zambia took the bronze medal with 27 board points, although they scored more match points (+8=1–1) than Egypt (+7=2–1) or Algeria (+7=1–2).

Four women's teams representing Algeria, Botswana, Nigeria and South Africa played a double round-robin held from 5 to 12 October. Algeria won the team gold medal scoring 19½ board points while South Africa scored 15 board points to win the team silver medal. Host nation Nigeria placed a distant third with seven board points and took bronze.

The men's and women's individual blitz competitions took place on 16 and 17 October. Each country was allowed to enter a maximum of three players into each blitz tournament, which were run using the Swiss system. In the nine-round men's tournament, Egypt's Fouad El-Taher won the gold medal on cumulative tiebreaks over his compatriot Ahmed Adly and Angola's Pedro Aderito after all three players scored seven points. In the seven-round women's tournament, Algeria's Farida Arouche won the gold medal scoring 5½ points, while South Africa's Cecile Van Der Merwe took silver and Algeria's Asma Houli took bronze.

Abuja also hosted the 2003 African Individual Chess Championships held concurrently with the All-Africa Games on 10 to 17 October. Many players participated in both competitions.

Shortly after the Games, Egypt's first reserve player Esam Aly Ahmed and team manager Mohammed Labib both died of cerebral malaria contracted in Abuja, after their illness was misdiagnosed in Egypt.

== Participating nations ==
- Algeria
- Angola
- Botswana
- Egypt
- Ethiopia
- Ivory Coast
- Libya
- Nigeria
- São Tomé and Príncipe
- South Africa
- Zambia
- Zimbabwe

== Medal summary ==
Event	Gold		Silver		Bronze	
Men's team – overall	Egypt (EGY); Fouad El-Taher; Essam El-Gindy; Imed Abdelnabbi; Ahmed Adly; Esam Aly Ahmed; Mohamed Ezat	31½	Algeria (ALG); Mohamed Henni; Adlane Arab; Kamel Sebih; Mohamed Haddouche; Krim Belkacem; Khaled Aoudia	28½	Zambia (ZAM); Amon Simutowe; Stanley Chumfwa; Nase Lungu; Malupande Lungu; Tizenge Mbambara	27
Men's team – Board 1	Fouad El-Taher; Egypt	91.7%	Amon Simutowe; Zambia	83.3%	Adérito Pedro; Angola	77.8%
Men's team – Board 2	Odion Aikhoje; Nigeria	91.7%	Adlane Arab; Algeria	88.9%	Essam El-Gindy; Egypt	66.7%
Men's team – Board 3	Bunmi Olape; Nigeria	85.7%	Amorim Agnelo; Angola	83.3%	Nase Lungu; Zambia	70.0%
Men's team – Board 4	Mohamed Haddouche; Algeria	100%	Ahmed Adly; Egypt	78.6%	Johannes Mabusela; South Africa	58.3%
Men's team – Board 5	Krim Belkacem; Algeria	100%	Catarino Domingos; Angola	85.7%	Esam Aly Ahmed; Egypt	83.3%
Men's team – Board 6	Khaled Ben Nasser; Libya	100%	Mohamed Ezat; Egypt	85.7%	Abimbola Ogunowo; Nigeria	41.7%
Women's team – overall	Algeria (ALG); Farida Arouche; Rabea Benkhaled; Asma Houli; Amina Mezioud; Wissam Toubal; Nassibu Bouchemu	19½	South Africa (RSA); Cecile Van Der Merwe; Mignon Pretorius; Denise Frick; Jenine Ellappen	15	Nigeria (NGR); Rachael Eward Dappa; Hannah Oposunju; Doris Omoragbon; Oluwatobiloba Olatunji; Rosemary Amadasun; Pauline Glewis	7
Women's team – Board 1	Cecile Van Der Merwe; South Africa	75.0%	Farida Arouche; Algeria	75.0%	Boikhutso Modongo; Botswana	41.7%
Women's team – Board 2	Rabea Benkhaled; Algeria	70.0%	Mignon Pretorius; South Africa	66.7%	Tshepiso Lopang; Botswana	16.7%
Women's team – Board 3	Asma Houli; Algeria	100%	Denise Frick; South Africa	58.3%	Doris Omoragbon; Nigeria	20.0%
Women's team – Board 4	Amina Mezioud; Algeria	75.0%	Oluwatobiloba Olatunji; Nigeria	62.5%	Jenine Ellappen; South Africa	50.0%
Women's team – Board 5	Wissam Toubal; Algeria	83.3%	Rosemary Amadasun; Nigeria	30.0%	none awarded	–
Women's team – Board 6	Pauline Glewis; Nigeria	37.5%	none awarded	–	none awarded	–
Men's individual	Fouad El-Taher; Egypt	7	Ahmed Adly; Egypt	7	Adérito Pedro; Angola	7
Women's individual	Farida Arouche; Algeria	5½	Cecile Van Der Merwe; South Africa	5	Asma Houli; Algeria	4½

== Medal table ==
* Host nation (Nigeria)

Rank	Nation	Gold	Silver	Bronze	Total
1	Algeria (ALG)	8	3	1	12
2	Egypt (EGY)	3	3	2	8
3	Nigeria (NGR)*	3	2	3	8
4	South Africa (RSA)	1	4	2	7
5	Libya (LBA)	1	0	0	1
6	Angola (ANG)	0	2	2	4
7	Zambia (ZAM)	0	1	2	3
8	Botswana (BOT)	0	0	2	2
Totals (8 entries)		16	15	14	45
