= Zambia at the 2003 All-Africa Games =

- IOC code: ZAM
- NOC: National Olympic Committee of Zambia

in Abuja 5 October 2003 – 17 October 2003
- Medals Ranked 23rd: Gold 0 Silver 1 Bronze 5 Total 6

All-Africa Games appearances (overview)
- 1965; 1973; 1978; 1987; 1991; 1995; 1999; 2003; 2007; 2011; 2015; 2019; 2023

Zambia competed in the 2003 All-Africa Games held at the National Stadium in the city of Abuja, Nigeria. The country sent a substantial team which won six medals and came joint twenty-third in the medal table. Amon Simutowe won a silver medal in chess. The team also received five bronze medals, including two in boxing and the team medals in chess and squash.

== Competitors ==
Zambia entered forty events, thirty eight for men and two for women. Competitors included a chess team that contained two strong players, Stanley Chumfwa and Amon Simutowe. Squash, which appeared for the first time at the Games, was well represented, with athletes O'Neal Chilambwe, Lazarus Chilufa and Richard Twali entering both as individuals and a team. Chilufa reached the quarter-finals, until he was beaten by Egypt’s Mohamed Abbas, while the team reached the semi-finals, until being beaten by Abbas’ team which then went on to win gold. In football, the team qualified in Group A, coming second to Nigeria, but losing to Ghana in the bronze medal play-off. Prince Mumba ran in the 800 metres, reaching the semi-finals.

== Medal summary ==
Zambia won six medals, a silver and five bronze medals, and was ranked joint twenty third in the final medal table alongside Congo and Mali.

=== Medal table ===
Sport	Gold	Silver	Bronze	Total
Boxing	0	0	2	2
Chess	0	1	1	2
Squah	0	0	1	1
Total	0	1	5	6

== List of Medalists ==
=== Silver Medal ===
Medal	Name	Sport	Event	Date	Ref
Silver	Amon Simutowe	Chess	Men’s 1st Table	15 October 2003	

=== Bronze Medal ===
Medal	Name	Sport	Event	Date	Ref
Bronze	Davis Mwale	Boxing	Light Welterweight 64 kg	9 October 2003	
Bronze	Ellis Chibuye	Boxing	Welterweight 69 kg	9 October 2003	
Bronze	Zambia	Chess	Team	10 October 2003	
Bronze	O'Neal Chilambwe; Lazarus Chilufa; Richard Twali	Squash	Men’s Team	14 October 2003	

== See also ==
- Zambia at the African Games
