= Houli =

Houli may refer to:

- Houli, Taichung, township in northwestern Taichung County, Taiwan
- Houli culture, Neolithic culture in Shandong, China
- Asma Houli, (born 1976), Algerian chess player
- Bachar Houli (born 1988), Australian rules footballer
