= Egypt at the 2003 All-Africa Games =

- IOC code: EGY
- NOC: Egyptian Olympic Committee

in Abuja 5 October 2003 – 17 October 2003
- Medals Ranked 2nd: Gold 81 Silver 66 Bronze 71 Total 218

All-Africa Games appearances (overview)
- 1965; 1973; 1978; 1987; 1991; 1995; 1999; 2003; 2007; 2011; 2015; 2019; 2023

Youth appearances
- 2010; 2014

Egypt competed in the 2003 All-Africa Games held at the National Stadium in the city of Abuja, Nigeria. The team came second overall with a total of 218 medals.

== Competitors ==
Egypt entered 149 events at the games. Of these, 115 were for men and 34 for women.

== Medal summary ==
Egypt won 218 medals, of which 81 were gold, 66 silver and 71 bronze, beaten only by the host, Nigeria.

=== Medal table ===
Sport	Gold	Silver	Bronze	Total
Athletics				
Boxing				
Chess				
Cycling				
Field hockey	1			1
Football				
Handball				
Judo				
Karate				
Handball				
Swimming				
Table tennis				
Taekwondo				
Tennis				
Volleyball				
Weightlifting				
Wrestling				
Total				
