= South Africa at the 2003 All-Africa Games =

- IOC code: RSA
- NOC: South African Sports Confederation and Olympic Committee

in Abuja 5 October 2003 – 17 October 2003
- Medals Ranked 3rd: Gold 63 Silver 59 Bronze 49 Total 171

All-Africa Games appearances (overview)
- 1995; 1999; 2003; 2007; 2011; 2015; 2019; 2023

South Africa competed in the 2003 All-Africa Games held at the National Stadium in the city of Abuja, Nigeria.

== Competitors ==
South Africa entered 149 events at the games. Of these, 126 were for men and 91 for women.

== Medal summary ==
South Africa won 171 medals, of which 63 were gold, 59 silver and 59 bronze.

=== Medal table ===
Sport	Gold	Silver	Bronze	Total
Athletics	7	9	9	25
Boxing		1	1	2
Chess	1	4	2	7
Cycling				
Field hockey	1	1		2
Football		1		1
Handball				
Judo				
Karate				
Squash		2	2	4
Swimming	25	19	9	53
Table tennis				
Taekwondo				
Tennis				
Volleyball				
Weightlifting				
Wrestling				
Total	63	59	59	171
