= Karim Benzema =

French footballer (born 1987)

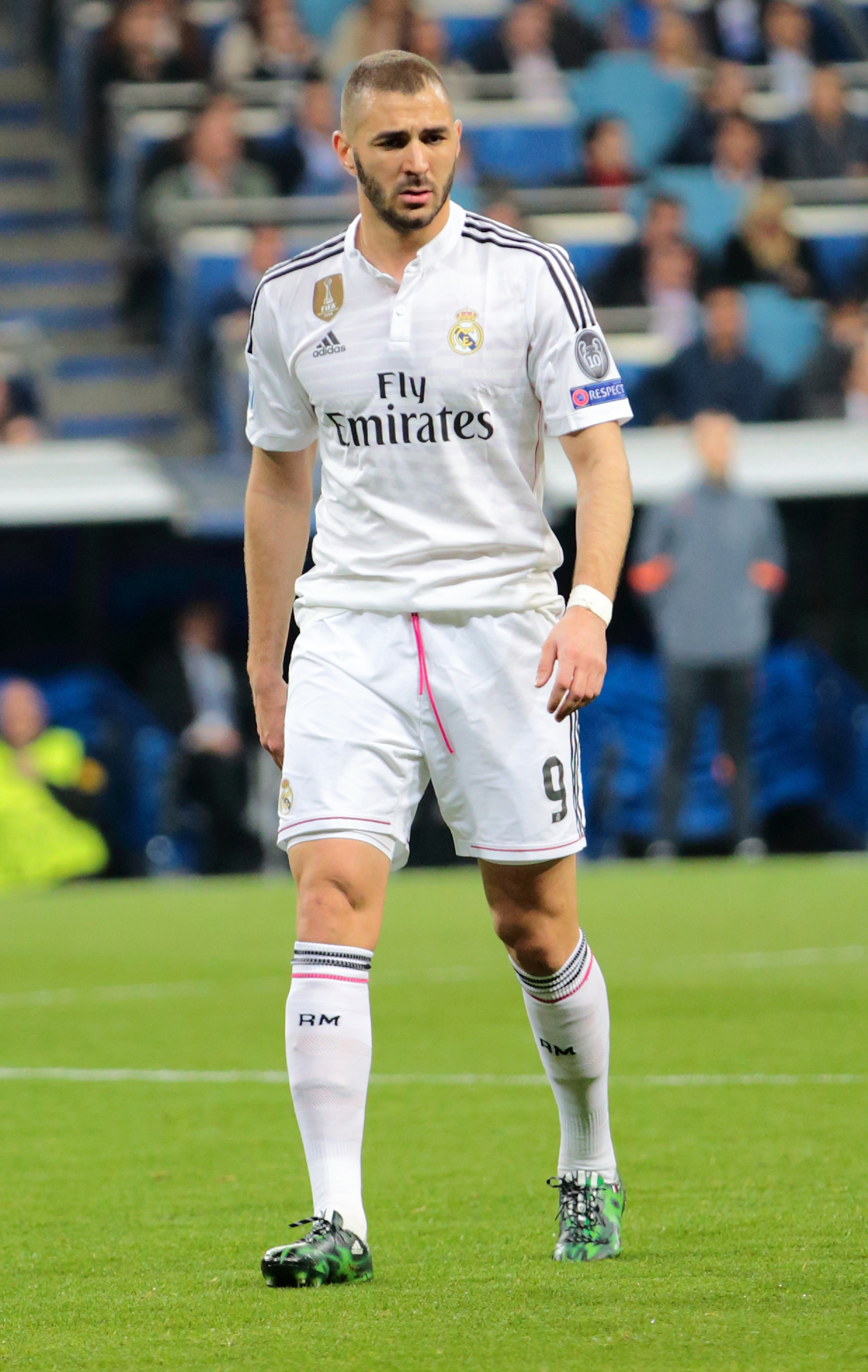
- Benzema with Real Madrid in 2015

Personal information
- Full name: Karim Mostafa Benzema
- Date of birth: 19 December 1987 (age 38)
- Place of birth: Lyon, France
- Height: 1.85 m (6 ft 1 in)
- Position: Striker

Youth career
- 1993–1996: AS des Buers Villeurbanne
- 1996–1997: Bron
- 1997–2005: Lyon

Senior career*
Years	Team	Apps	(Gls)
2004–2006	Lyon II	20	(15)
2004–2009	Lyon	112	(43)
2009–2023	Real Madrid	439	(238)
2023–2026	Al-Ittihad	64	(38)
2026	Al-Hilal	12	(10)

International career
2004	France U17	4	(1)
2004–2005	France U18	17	(14)
2005–2006	France U19	9	(5)
2006	France U21	5	(0)
2007–2022	France	97	(37)
Medal record
Men's football
Representing France
FIFA World Cup
Runner-up	2022 Qatar
UEFA Nations League
Winner	2021 Italy
UEFA European Under-17 Championship
Winner	2004 France
- * Club domestic league appearances and goals as of 22:06, 20 August 2026 (UTC)

Karim Mostafa Benzema (born 19 December 1987) is a French professional footballer who plays as a striker. He is a free agent. Regarded as one of the greatest strikers of all time, Benzema is known for his creativity, technical skills, vision and versatility on the field. He won 25 trophies with Real Madrid, including four La Liga titles, three Copa del Rey titles, and five UEFA Champions League titles. He has scored over 500 career goals for club and country, and is Real Madrid's second-highest goalscorer and its third-highest assist provider. In the Champions League, Benzema is both the all-time French top goalscorer and assist provider.

Born in Lyon to parents of Algerian and Kabyle descent, Benzema began his career with his hometown club Lyon in 2005, contributing sporadically to three Ligue 1 title wins. In 2008, he was named the league's Player of the Year and in the Team of the Year having finished as the league's top goalscorer and winning his fourth league title and first Coupe de France. In 2009, Benzema was the subject of a then-French record football transfer when he joined Real Madrid in a deal worth €35 million. He was part of a highly rated trio alongside Cristiano Ronaldo and Gareth Bale – dubbed "BBC" – who helped Madrid to four Champions League titles between 2014 and 2018.

Following Ronaldo's departure in 2018, Benzema transitioned from the false 9 position into a sole striker. He was named in the La Liga Team of the Season for five consecutive years from 2018 to 2023, won La Liga Best Player twice and the Pichichi Trophy for the first time in 2022. Benzema finished as Champions League top scorer as he won his fifth title in 2022, and subsequently captained the club in his final season before signing for Al-Ittihad the following year. As captain, he led Al-Ittihad to the 2024–25 Saudi Pro League title.

A French international, Benzema won the 2004 UEFA European Under-17 Championship and made his senior debut for France in 2007, at age 19. After appearing at UEFA Euro 2008, Benzema was controversially left out of the squad for the 2010 FIFA World Cup; following his return for Euro 2012 and the 2014 World Cup, he did not play for France for over five years after being implicated in a blackmailing scandal in 2015. He later returned to the squad for Euro 2020, where he won the Bronze Boot. Benzema was also a part of the French squad that finished as runners-up at the 2022 FIFA World Cup. However, he did not play at the tournament due to an injury, though he did receive a medal. He announced his international retirement in December 2022 following the World Cup. Overall, Benzema earned 97 caps and scored 37 goals, ranking as France's sixth-highest all-time top goalscorer, and was named French Player of the Year by France Football four times.

For his performances in 2021 and 2022, Benzema was awarded the UEFA Player of the Year and the Ballon d'Or, becoming the fifth French player to have won the Ballon d'Or. One of the highest-paid footballers in the world, he made Forbes's list of the world's highest-paid athletes in 2024.

== Early life and family ==
Benzema was born in Lyon to French nationals of Algerian descent. His grandfather, Da Lakehal Benzema, lived in the village of Tigzirt, located in the northern town of Aït Djellil in Bejaia Province, Algeria before migrating to Lyon, where he eventually settled in the 1950s. Benzema's father, Hafid, was born in Tigzirt, while his mother, Wahida Djebbara, was born and raised in Lyon; her family originated from Oran. Benzema is the third youngest in the family and grew up with eight other siblings in Bron, an eastern suburb of Lyon. His younger brothers Gressy and Sabri are also footballers. The former plays at the amateur level with Vaulx-le-Velin in the Division d'Honneur, the sixth division of French football, while the latter plays in the youth academy of a club in the family's hometown of Bron.

== Club career ==
=== Early career ===
Benzema began his career at his hometown club Bron Terraillon at the age of eight. After scoring two goals in an under-10 match against the Lyon youth academy, he attracted attention from Lyon. According to Serge Santa Cruz, Bron Terraillon's president at the time, Lyon officials visited him in an attempt to sign Benzema, but Santa Cruz refused. After consultation with Benzema's father, Bron Terraillon allowed Benzema to undergo a trial with Lyon. Following the trial, Benzema officially joined Lyon's youth academy.

=== Lyon ===
Benzema quickly ascended up the youth categories in the academy. He served as a ballboy during Lyon senior team matches and performed well in school. At the under-16 level, Benzema scored 38 goals in the Championnat National des 16 ans, the domestic league for under-16 youth players in France. Ahead of the 2004–05 season, Benzema was promoted to the club's reserve team, which was playing in the Championnat de France amateur, the fourth division of French football. Despite only playing with the team during the autumn campaign, he scored a team-high ten goals as the Lyon reserve team finished second in its group.

==== 2004–2007: Breakthrough and three league titles ====
Benzema was called up to the senior team for the first time under manager Paul Le Guen during the break leading up to the second half of the season. As is customary with new players arriving at Lyon, the young striker had to stand up and speak to his new teammates, which at that time included the likes of Michael Essien, Sylvain Wiltord, Florent Malouda and Eric Abidal. While speaking, Benzema was subjected to jokes and laughter, which prompted the youngster to declare, "Do not laugh, I'm here to take your place." He made his professional debut on 15 January 2005 against Metz, appearing as a substitute for Pierre-Alain Frau. Lyon won the match 2–0 as Benzema provided the assist of the second goal scored by Bryan Bergougnoux. He signed his first professional contract the same month, agreeing to a three-year deal. After making three more appearances as a substitute, on 2 April Benzema made his first professional start in a 1–0 win over Lens. He finished the campaign with six appearances as Lyon won their fourth-straight league title.

Benzema began the 2005–06 season under the tutelage of new manager Gérard Houllier. Under Houllier, he struggled for meaningful minutes due to the presence of newly signed Brazilian striker Fred, as well as Sylvain Wiltord. Benzema made his season debut on 2 October 2005 in a league win over Rennes, appearing as a substitute. On 6 December, he made his UEFA Champions League debut in Lyon's final group stage match against Norwegian club Rosenborg. On his competition debut, he scored his first professional goal in a 2–1 win. A month later, Benzema scored his first professional double in a 4–0 win over Grenoble in the Coupe de France. On 4 March 2006, Benzema scored his first professional league goal against Ajaccio in a 3–1 win.

Benzema began earning more playing time in the 2006–07 season and made his competitive season debut in the 2006 Trophée des Champions against Paris Saint-Germain. In the French Supercup, Benzema converted a penalty which drew the match at 1–1. Lyon later won the league curtain-raiser 5–4 on penalties. Benzema opened the league campaign on a quick note scoring in the team's first match of the season against Nantes. Three weeks later, on 26 August 2006, Benzema appeared as a substitute and scored two goals in a 4–1 away win over Nice. He also converted two goals in the Champions League group stage against Romanian outfit Steaua București and Ukrainian club Dynamo Kyiv. After appearing regularly during the autumn campaign, on 10 November, Benzema suffered a severe thigh injury. The injury resulted in the striker missing three months of action before returning in February 2007. Benzema failed to score a goal until the final league match of the season against Nantes as Lyon recorded its sixth consecutive league title.

==== 2007–2009: Club talisman ====
For the 2007–08 season, with Florent Malouda, John Carew and Sylvain Wiltord all departing from the club, Benzema switched to the number 10 shirt and was inserted into the lead striker role. After forming a special relationship with new manager Alain Perrin, he responded with 31 goals in 51 games. He topped the league with 20 goals, scored four goals in the Champions League, one in the Coupe de la Ligue and totaled six goals in six Coupe de France matches, helping Lyon win their first ever double. Some of his more dazzling performances that season included a hat-trick against Metz on 15 September, an equalizing goal in the 90th minute from a free kick against Derby du Rhône rivals Saint-Étienne, and a goal against Lens that was nominated for goal of the season by fans.

In the Champions League, Benzema scored an important double against Rangers at Ibrox Stadium on the last match day of the group stage. The 3–0 victory assured Lyon progression to the knockout rounds. In the knockout rounds, Lyon faced Manchester United and Benzema continued to score, this time it was from outside the penalty box in the first leg match which ended in a 1–1 draw and United eventually won the tie 1–2 on aggregate. Manchester United manager Sir Alex Ferguson and players praised Benzema for his performance. Lyon club president Jean-Michel Aulas later accused Ferguson of tapping-up Benzema.

On 13 March 2008, Benzema extended his contract with Lyon until 2013 with a one-year extension option. After signing his new contract, Benzema became one of the highest paid footballers in France. For his efforts that season, he was named the Ligue 1 Player of the Year, selected to the Team of the Year and awarded the Trophée du Meilleur Buteur for being the league's top scorer. He won the 2008 Bravo Award given to the most outstanding young footballer playing in Europe, and was also shortlisted by France Football for the 2008 Ballon d'Or award, eventually won by Cristiano Ronaldo.

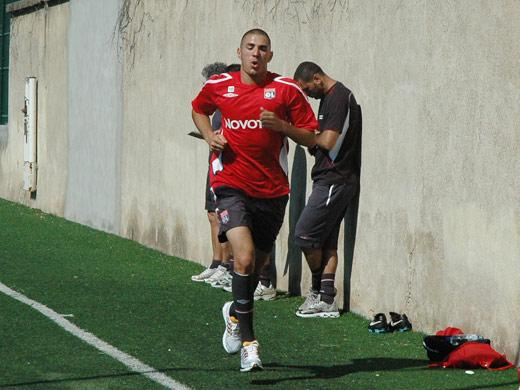
Benzema during a training session with Lyon in 2008

Benzema got off to a good start for the 2008–09 season, scoring twice in Lyon's opening league match against Toulouse. The following three weeks, he scored goals against Rhône-Alpes rivals Grenoble and Saint-Étienne and scored a goal against Nice, converting a penalty in the dying seconds. Lyon won all three matches. As a result of his early goals, Lyon club president Jean-Michel Aulas quelled the many transfer rumors surrounding Benzema by placing a €100 million price tag on the striker. He was also nominated alongside Franck Ribéry to be featured on the French cover of the video game FIFA 09.

He scored his seventh goal of the league on 29 October, scoring in the 2–0 win over Sochaux. Benzema scored again the following weekend in a 2–0 win over Le Mans. He was among the top scorers in the Champions League group stage, scoring five goals, a double against Steaua București, two goals in two matches against Fiorentina, and a goal against the eventual group winners Bayern Munich on the final match day.

Following the winter break, Benzema endured a rough patch going scoreless the first three games before recording his 11th goal of the season against Nice in a 3–1 victory. Two weeks later, he scored his 12th goal against Nancy in a 2–0 victory. The next nine matches, both Benzema and Lyon's form dwindled losing four matches, drawing three and winning only two with Benzema scoring only two goals in that stretch, both of them against Le Mans in a 3–1 victory. The bad form resulted in Lyon losing their grip on first-place position and eventually falling out of the title race, thus ending their streak of seven consecutive Ligue 1 titles. Benzema was a part of four of those title runs.

Despite losing the title, Benzema got back on track scoring his 15th and 16th goals of the season on 17 May in a 3–1 away victory over rivals Marseille, the first goal being a penalty. He scored his 17th goal the following weekend against Caen in a 3–1 victory moving him into third place among Ligue 1 top scorers.

=== Real Madrid ===
==== 2009–10: Transfer and adapting to Spain ====
On 1 July 2009, it was announced that Lyon had reached an agreement with Spanish club Real Madrid for the transfer of Benzema. The transfer fee was priced at €35 million with the fee rising to as much as €41 million based on incentives. On 9 July, Benzema successfully passed his medical and signed his contract, a six-year deal, later that afternoon. He was presented officially as a Real Madrid player later that night at the Santiago Bernabéu Stadium, similarly to the previous signings of Kaká and Cristiano Ronaldo. Benzema made his Real Madrid debut on 20 July in the club's opening pre-season friendly against Irish team Shamrock Rovers in Dublin, appearing as a half-time substitute. He scored the lone goal in the club's 1–0 win, scoring in the 87th minute. On 24 August, Benzema scored two goals in Real Madrid's 4–0 victory over Norwegian club Rosenborg in an annual friendly tournament organized for the Santiago Bernabeu Trophy. The goals brought his total tally in the pre-season with Real Madrid to five, making him the joint top scorer alongside fellow striker Raúl.

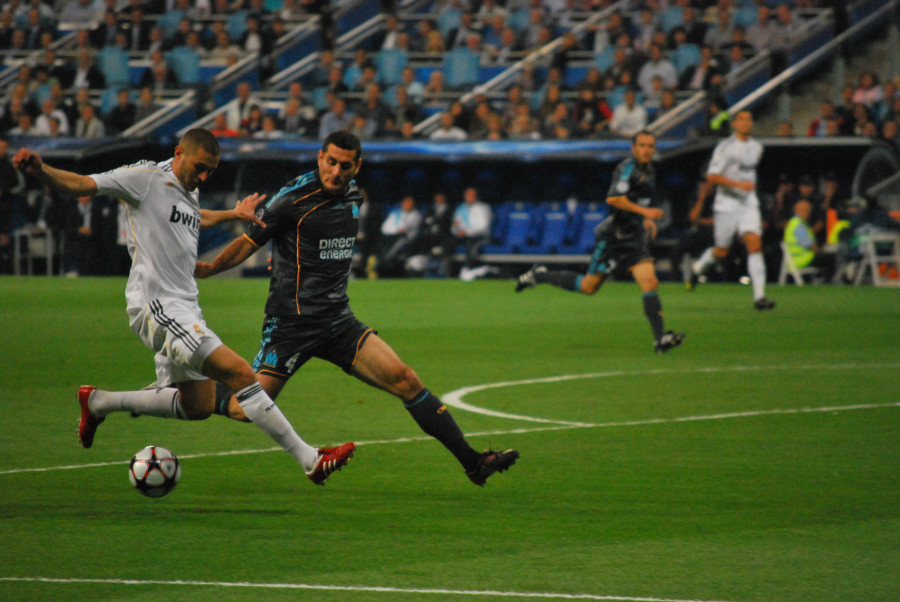
Benzema playing against Marseille in a Champions League match in 2009

Benzema made his league debut for Madrid on 29 August 2009 against Deportivo La Coruña. He started the match, but was substituted out in the second half as Madrid won 3–2. A month later, he scored his first goal for the club in a 5–0 victory against newly promoted Xerez. After missing the mid-week match against Villarreal, against Tenerife at the weekend, Benzema scored his first double for Madrid in a 3–0 home victory. He made his Champions League debut for the club on 30 September in a group stage tie against Marseille. After failing to score a goal in the month of October, in the team's first match in November against Italian club Milan in the Champions League, Benzema scored the opener to give Madrid a 1–0 lead. His goal was later cancelled out by a Ronaldinho penalty.

In late November, Benzema began appearing mainly as a substitute as manager Manuel Pellegrini preferred Gonzalo Higuaín in the lead striker role. To coincide with his benching, Benzema was also being criticized by the Spanish media for his under-performance and difficulties settling in the country as he had not yet begun learning the Spanish language. He was declared the "new Anelka" by a Marca blogger, referring to former Real Madrid striker Nicolas Anelka who had a tumultuous year at the club before being sold. Benzema was defended by his compatriot Zinedine Zidane, who admitted "after two months, I was also criticized" and that Benzema was "a talented player and talented players in Madrid must win".

On 5 December, Benzema appeared as a substitute for Rafael van der Vaart and scored the third goal in a 6–0 romp of Almería. The day after the match against Almería, Benzema responded to the criticism by stating, "I am totally integrated and very happy at Real Madrid", and, "Yes, I have improved my adaptation. I have a new home and I'm learning Spanish to understand myself better with my teammates." After nearly a month coming off of the bench, he started alongside Higuaín away to Valencia on 12 December. A week later, Benzema returned to the bench. Following an injury to Higuaín in early January 2010, Pellegrini inserted Benzema back into the starting lineup. After failing to score in his first two starts in the absence of Higuaín, against Deportivo La Coruña on 30 January, he scored a double in an important 3–1 away win. Following the return of Higuaín, Benzema was relegated back to a substitute's role and finished the campaign by making eight consecutive appearances off the bench. Included in one of those appearances was his final goal of the season against Athletic Bilbao in a 5–1 win.

==== 2010–11: First-team mainstay ====
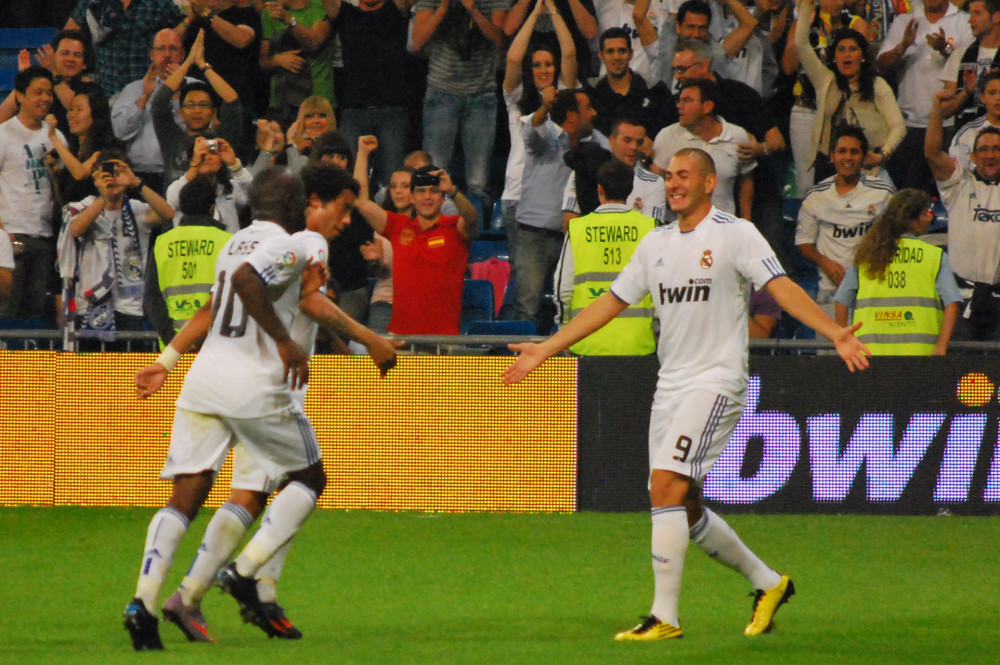
Benzema celebrating a goal against Espanyol in 2010

Ahead of the 2010–11 season, Benzema switched to the number 9 shirt as Real Madrid were under the tutelage of new incoming manager José Mourinho. The striker immediately drew the ire of Mourinho who declared to reporters during a pre-season media session that "Benzema must understand that he is extremely talented, but that in itself is not enough", while also stating that "[Madrid] need a striker who is sparky, not one that is listless". Mourinho sentiments were later echoed by incoming France national team coach Laurent Blanc who acknowledged that Benzema was "not used to working". Blanc also stated that the striker needed to shed weight in order to fulfill his potential.

Due to Mourinho preferring Ronaldo and Higuaín as his forwards, Benzema began the campaign as a substitute coming off the bench in the team's opening league match of the season against Mallorca. Following the September international break, he made his first start in a 1–0 win over Osasuna. On 21 September, Benzema made a substitute appearance and scored his first goal of the season in a 3–0 home win against Espanyol. Afterwards, the striker failed to score a domestic goal for nearly two months.

On 10 November, Benzema scored his second goal of the campaign against Real Murcia in the 2010–11 edition of the Copa del Rey. In late November, Benzema was inserted into the starting eleven following a severe back injury to Higuaín, along with the team's lack of senior strikers. In his first match since being inserted into the starting lineup permanently, he scored his first Champions League goal of the season in a group stage fixture against Dutch club Ajax. In Madrid's final group stage tie against Auxerre, Benzema scored his first hat trick for the club in a 4–0 win. The first goal he scored was Real Madrid's 300th goal in the Champions League era. Two weeks later, Benzema converted another hat trick, this time in an 8–0 thrashing of Levante in the Copa del Rey. In late January, for the first time in his Real Madrid career, Benzema scored goals in back-to-back matches. On 23 January, he scored the only goal in a 1–0 win at home against Mallorca. Three days later, Benzema repeated his efforts scoring the only goal in a win over Sevilla in the first leg of the team's Copa del Rey semi-final tie. Real Madrid later advanced to its 37th Copa del Rey final in club history after beating Sevilla 2–0 in the second leg.

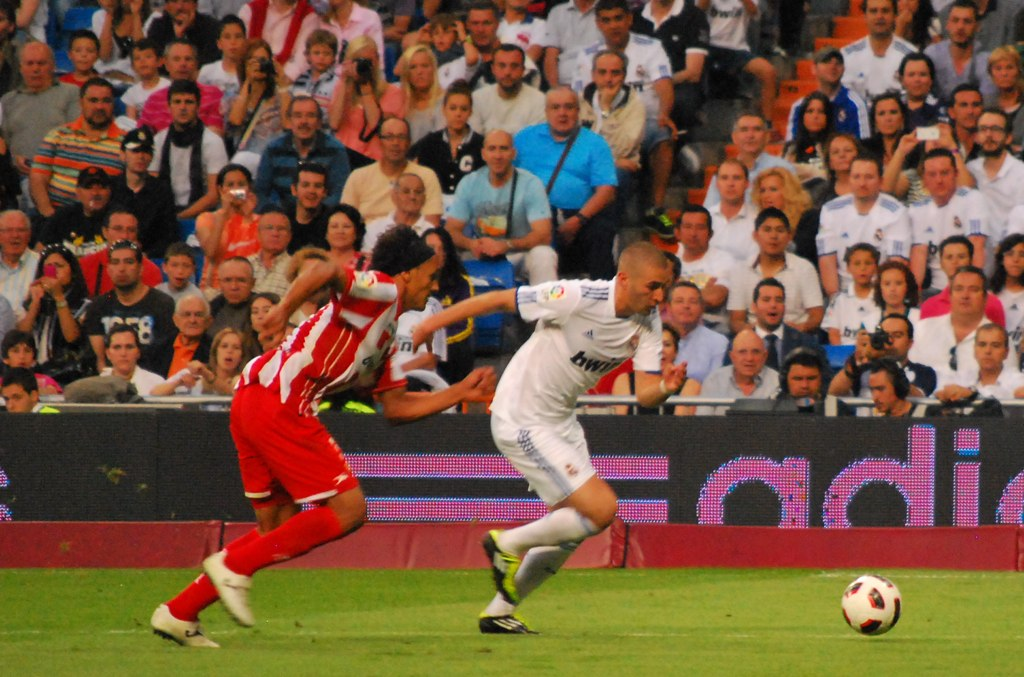
Benzema playing in a league match against Almería in 2011

Following the arrival of Emmanuel Adebayor on loan, Benzema went unused in two consecutive league matches in February 2011. He returned to the starting lineup on 19 February and embarked on a run in which he scored ten goals in eight matches. Included in those ten goals were doubles in three straight matches against Málaga, Racing Santander and Hércules, as well as a goal in the first leg of Madrid's Round of 16 tie against former club Lyon. The strike against his hometown club was the 100th goal of his professional career, and also the first goal for Real Madrid at the Stade de Gerland in six years, though despite the honours associated with netting the goal, Benzema did not celebrate out of respect for his former club.

On 19 March, he scored the opener in the El Derbi madrileño as Real Madrid went on to win the match 2–1. Despite his form, Benzema appeared in only one of the four highly anticipated matches against El Clásico rivals Barcelona, in which the two clubs met in the league, the 2011 Copa del Rey final and the Champions League knockout stage. In between those clashes, on 23 April 2011, Benzema scored a goal in a 6–3 win over Valencia. On 30 April, he scored a goal in the team's 3–2 loss to Real Zaragoza. It was the only match of the campaign that Real Madrid lost, in which Benzema scored. To close out the campaign, Benzema scored another double in an 8–1 win over Almería. He finished the campaign second on the team behind Ronaldo with 26 goals as Real Madrid captured the Copa del Rey giving Benzema his first honour with the club. For his performances during the campaign, particularly during the second half, Benzema was praised by Mourinho, club officials Florentino Pérez and Emilio Butragueño, as well as national team manager Laurent Blanc.

==== 2011–12: First La Liga championship ====
Prior to the start of the 2011–12 season, Benzema, taking the advice of compatriots Blanc and Zidane, ventured to Merano, Italy, to attend a high performance clinic where he underwent treatment to reduce his weight. The spell at the clinic was ultimately a success after the striker arrived at pre-season 8 kilograms (18 lb) lighter. While at the clinic, Benzema also underwent physical training to build up his muscle mass. The striker was impressive in the pre-season scoring eight goals in seven matches. His performances during the pre-season resulted in Mourinho naming him the starting lead striker for the new campaign. Mourinho was later credited with Benzema's transformation, but denied full responsibility and, instead, gave credit to the striker himself.

In the second leg of the 2011 Supercopa de España against Barcelona, and with Madrid trailing 4–3 on aggregate late in the match, Benzema scored the equalizing goal to even the tie at 4–4. However, six minutes later, a Lionel Messi strike gave Barcelona the supercup. In the team's second league match of the season against Getafe, Benzema scored a double in a 4–2 victory. After going goalless in three consecutive league matches, he scored his third league goal of the campaign against Rayo Vallecano in a 4–2 win. In the team's ensuing match against Ajax in the Champions League, Benzema scored Madrid's third goal in a 3–0 home win. In the club's next Champions League match against Lyon, Benzema scored again by netting the opener in a 4–0 win against Lyon.

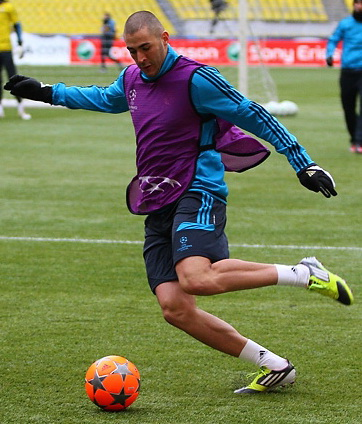
Benzema training ahead of a Champions League match in 2012

In November 2011, Benzema scored five goals; three in the league and two in Europe. In the league, he converted his three goals in wins over Osasuna and Valencia, while he scored his two Champions League goals in a 6–2 group stage win over Croatian club Dinamo Zagreb. On 10 December 2011, Benzema scored the opener in Madrid's 3–1 defeat to Barcelona in the El Clásico. The goal, scored just 21 seconds into the match, was the fastest goal ever scored in a match between the two rivals. Three days after his record-breaking goal, for his performances during the 2011 calendar year, Benzema was named the France Football French Player of the Year, beating out Barcelona defender Eric Abidal and Lyon goalkeeper Hugo Lloris. He became only the second French player based in Spain to win the award, and also the second Real Madrid player to capture it. Zidane was the first to achieve both honorable mentions. Benzema expressed gratitude at winning the award, stating, "It is a pleasure to win an individual trophy. When I see the previous winners – Zidane, Henry and other major players – it makes me proud to join them on the list." In the team's next match after winning the award, against Sevilla, Benzema assisted two goals in a 6–2 triumph.

Benzema opened the 2012 portion of the campaign in positive form. He scored goals against Granada and Málaga. Benzema scored against the latter club in the Copa del Rey in each leg of the Round of 16. The 4–2 aggregate win advanced Real Madrid to the quarter-finals where the club faced Barcelona. After failing to score in the first leg, which ended 2–1 in favour of Barça, in the second leg on 25 January 2012, Benzema scored his third goal of the season against the Blaugrana, but Madrid failed to win the tie losing 4–3 on aggregate. On 12 February, Benzema scored his first league goal in over a month against Levante. A week later, he scored a double in a 4–0 shutout of Racing Santander. On 24 March, Benzema scored two goals in a league win over Real Sociedad. The two goals made him the top French scorer in La Liga history surpassing Zidane. Three days later, Benzema scored another double in a 3–0 first leg away win over Cypriot team APOEL in the Champions League quarter-finals. On 29 April, Benzema put in a masterful performance scoring two goals and assisting another in a 3–0 win over Sevilla. The double was his seventh of the season and allowed Madrid to close in on its first Primera Division title in four years. Los Blancos captured their 32nd league title the following week cruising to a 3–0 win over Athletic Bilbao. Benzema appeared as a second-half substitute in the match.

==== 2012–2016: Sustained continental success ====
On the first matchday of the Champions League, Benzema scored an equalizer against Manchester City in 3–2 win at Santiago Bernabéu. On 4 October 2012, Benzema scored a bicycle kick goal off a cross by Kaká in a 4–1 win against Ajax in Amsterdam. On 18 December, one day before his 25th birthday, his fine form saw him earn the award for best French footballer of 2012, for the second year running. On 2 March 2013, Benzema opened the scoring against Barcelona in the league game at the Santiago Bernabéu. Real went on to win the game 2–1, the second time they beat Barcelona in a week.

Ahead of the 2013–14 season, Benzema became part of a trio alongside Cristiano Ronaldo and newly signed Gareth Bale – dubbed "BBC". Benzema started the season by scoring in a 2–1 win over Real Betis at the Santiago Bernabéu. After four matches without scoring (two with Real Madrid and two with France), he returned to goal-scoring form by netting twice in a 6–1 away win over Galatasaray in Champions League. On 18 January 2014, he scored his 100th goal for Madrid in a 5–0 victory at Real Betis. On 23 March, Benzema scored two goals against fierce rivals Barcelona in El Clásico at the Bernabéu from two crosses by Ángel Di María, taking his goal tally in La Liga to 17 goals, though Barcelona won the match 4–3.

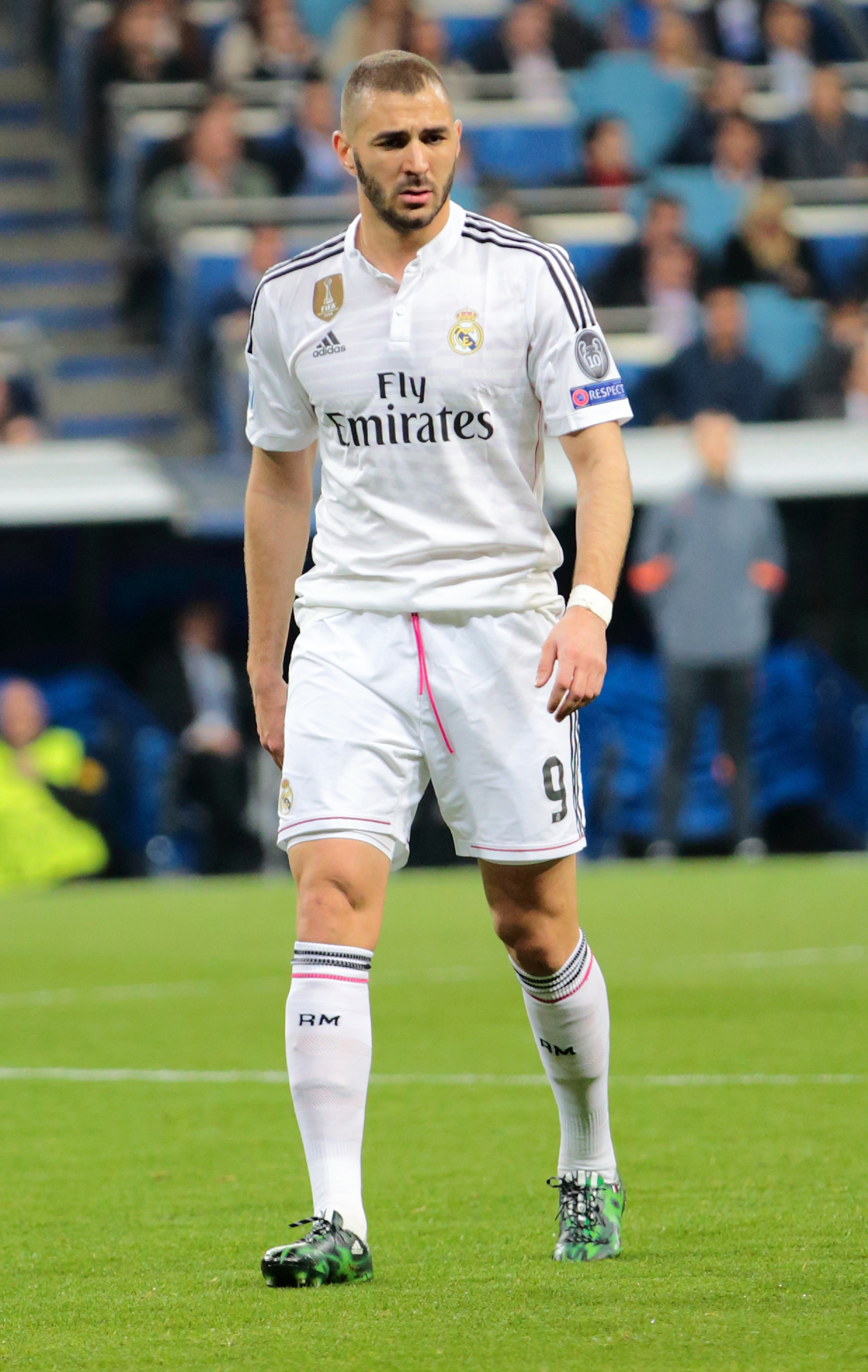
Benzema playing for Real Madrid in 2015

Benzema was part of Real Madrid's starting eleven in the 2014 Copa del Rey final on 16 April at the Mestalla Stadium, and assisted Di María's opening goal before Gareth Bale hit the winner for Madrid in a 2–1 victory. One week later, on 23 April, Benzema scored the only goal of the game to win the first leg of a Champions League semi-final against Bayern Munich, 1–0. The club went on to win the final in May. Real Madrid's attacking trio of Bale, Benzema and Cristiano, dubbed "BBC", finished the season with 97 goals.

On 6 August 2014, Real Madrid announced that Benzema had signed a new five-year deal that would keep him at the club until 2019. On 12 August 2014, Benzema played the whole 90 minutes in Real Madrid's 2–0 win against Sevilla in Cardiff to claim the UEFA Super Cup. On 16 September, Benzema scored Real Madrid's 1,000th goal in European competition after netting a goal in a 5–1 victory over Basel in the first match of the Champions League group stage. He scored the winning goal in Real Madrid's 2–1 away victory against Ludogorets Razgrad in the Champions League after coming on as a second-half substitute. The next weekend, he scored a brace in the 5–0 victory against Athletic Bilbao in La Liga. In 2014, Benzema won France Football's award for French Player of the Year for the third time; only Thierry Henry has won this award on more occasions.

Benzema was chosen as La Liga Player of the Month for October 2014, with his manager Carlo Ancelotti winning the equivalent award. He scored three of Real Madrid's 13 goals of the month, in which they won three matches and only conceded just one goal. On 8 December 2015, Benzema scored a hat trick in an 8–0 thrashing against Malmö. On 20 December, he scored another hat trick in a 10–2 victory over Rayo Vallecano. He was a regular starter when the team won the 2015–16 UEFA Champions League.

==== 2016–2018: European threepeat and second league title ====
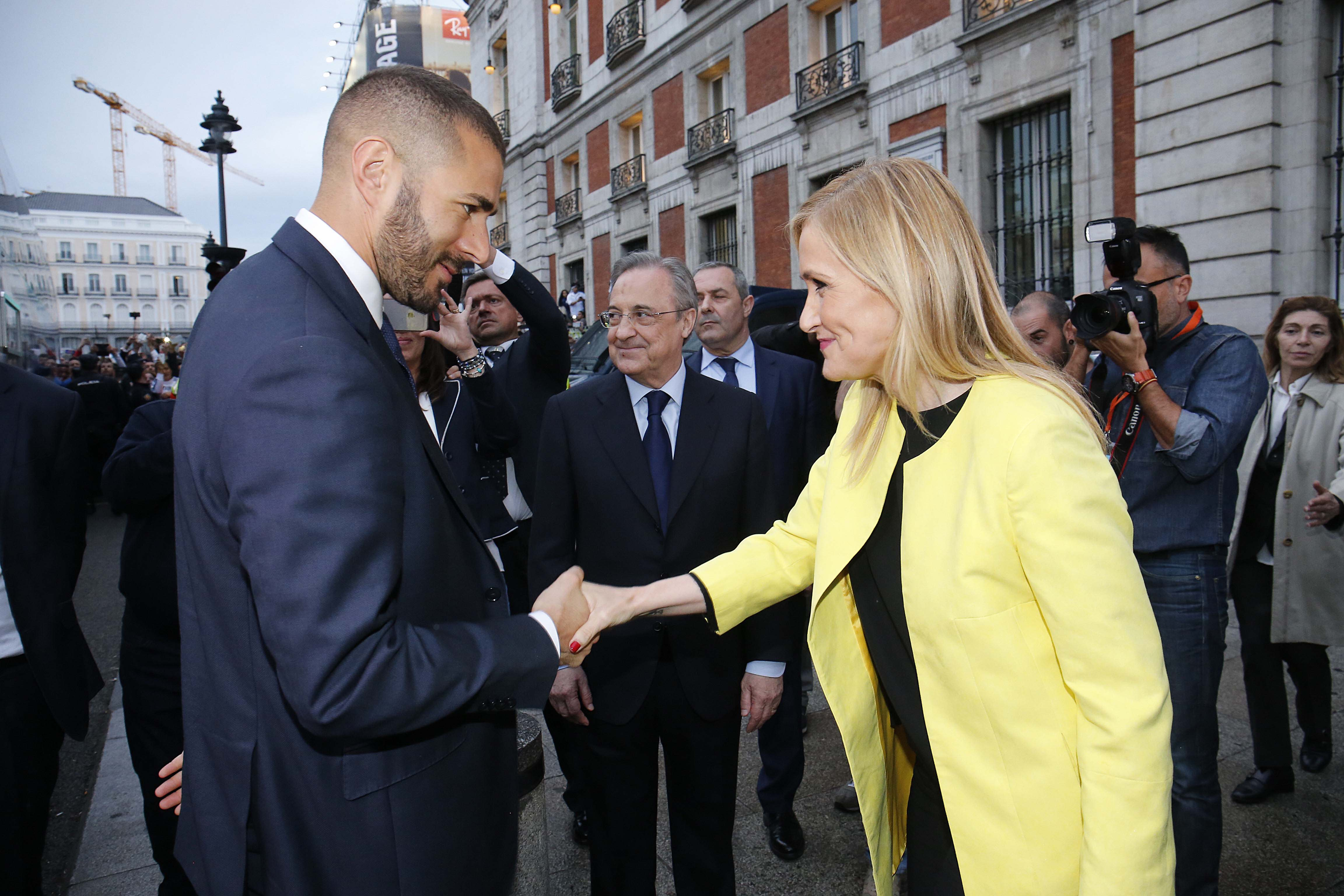
Benzema with Cristina Cifuentes during the 2016 Champions League title celebrations in Madrid

In December 2016, Benzema was called up in Real Madrid's squad for the 2016 FIFA Club World Cup in Japan. In the semi-final match against América on 15 December, Benzema scored in the last moments of the first half, helping the team to progress in the final by winning 2–0. In the final three days later against Kashima Antlers, Benzema opened the score in the ninth minute, and also assisted Ronaldo's second goal, as Real Madrid won 4–2 in extra time after the regular time finished 2–2 to claim their second title. It was Benzema's tenth title with Real Madrid, and finished the competition as joint-second topscorer with two goals in two matches.

On 15 February 2017, in the first leg of 2016–17 UEFA Champions League round of 16 against Napoli, Benzema scored Real Madrid's first goal in an eventual 3–1 home win, which was his 51st goal in this competition, overtaking Thierry Henry on the list of all-time Champions League top scorers. It was his first goal in six matches and for this performance he was voted Man of the Match. He was a regular starter, and scored the last goal of the season which gave him eleven for the campaign, when Madrid won the 2016–17 La Liga and the 2016–17 UEFA Champions League.

On 20 September 2017, Benzema signed a contract extension that would keep him at the club until 2021. Later, on 6 March of the following year, Benzema made his 100th UEFA Champions League appearance by playing in the 2–1 win at Parc des Princes against Paris Saint-Germain in the second leg of 2017–18 UEFA Champions League round of 16 as Real Madrid progressed to the next round 5–2 on aggregate. Benzema played his 400th match in all competitions for Real Madrid on 31 March in the 3–0 win at Las Palmas, captaining the team and netting the second goal with a penalty. On 1 May, Benzema scored twice in a 2–2 draw against Bayern Munich in the return leg of the 2017–18 UEFA Champions League semi-final, as Real progressed to the final on a 4–3 aggregate. On 26 May, Benzema scored the first goal of the match in 2018 UEFA Champions League final by intercepting Loris Karius's throw in a 3–1 victory over Liverpool, when Madrid won their third consecutive and 13th overall Champions League title.

==== 2018–2021: Club talisman, third league title and the return of Zidane ====
With the departure of Cristiano Ronaldo to Juventus in July 2018, Benzema became Real Madrid's new goal-getter – scoring 30 goals in all competitions in 2018–19 as the club's top scorer for the campaign. His prominence in Real Madrid's squad significantly increased.

On 7 November 2018, Benzema scored a brace in the 5–0 win at Viktoria Plzeň in the UEFA Champions League group stage, reaching the 200th goal milestone with the club, becoming only the seventh Madrid player to achieve the feat. He scored three goals in six matches, all of them against Plzeň, helping Real Madrid topping Group G. Later, on 13 February of the following year, in the first leg of the competition's round of 16, Benzema scored the opener of a 2–1 away win over Ajax, reaching 60 Champions League goals, becoming only the fourth player to do so.

Benzema scored Madrid's first competitive goal of the 2019–20 season on 17 August in the 3–1 away win over Celta Vigo in the opening La Liga match. Later, on 6 November, he scored a brace in Madrid's 6–0 crushing of Galatasaray, achieving two new milestones: he became the second player after Lionel Messi to score in 15 consecutive Champions League seasons and also the third Madrid player to score 50 goals in the competition. His performances were praised by manager Zinedine Zidane, who called him a legend and also compared him with Cristiano Ronaldo. Three days later, in the next league match, he scored a first-half brace in a 4–0 win at Eibar, overtaking Ferenc Puskás as the club's sixth all-time goalscorer in La Liga with 157 goals from 323 appearances. In February 2020, Benzema extended his contract with Real Madrid until 2022. On 1 March, he made his 500th appearance for Real Madrid in a 2–0 home win over Barcelona in El Clásico, becoming the fourteenth player in the club's history to achieve this milestone. At the end of the season, Real Madrid won the 2019–20 La Liga, while scoring over 20 goals.

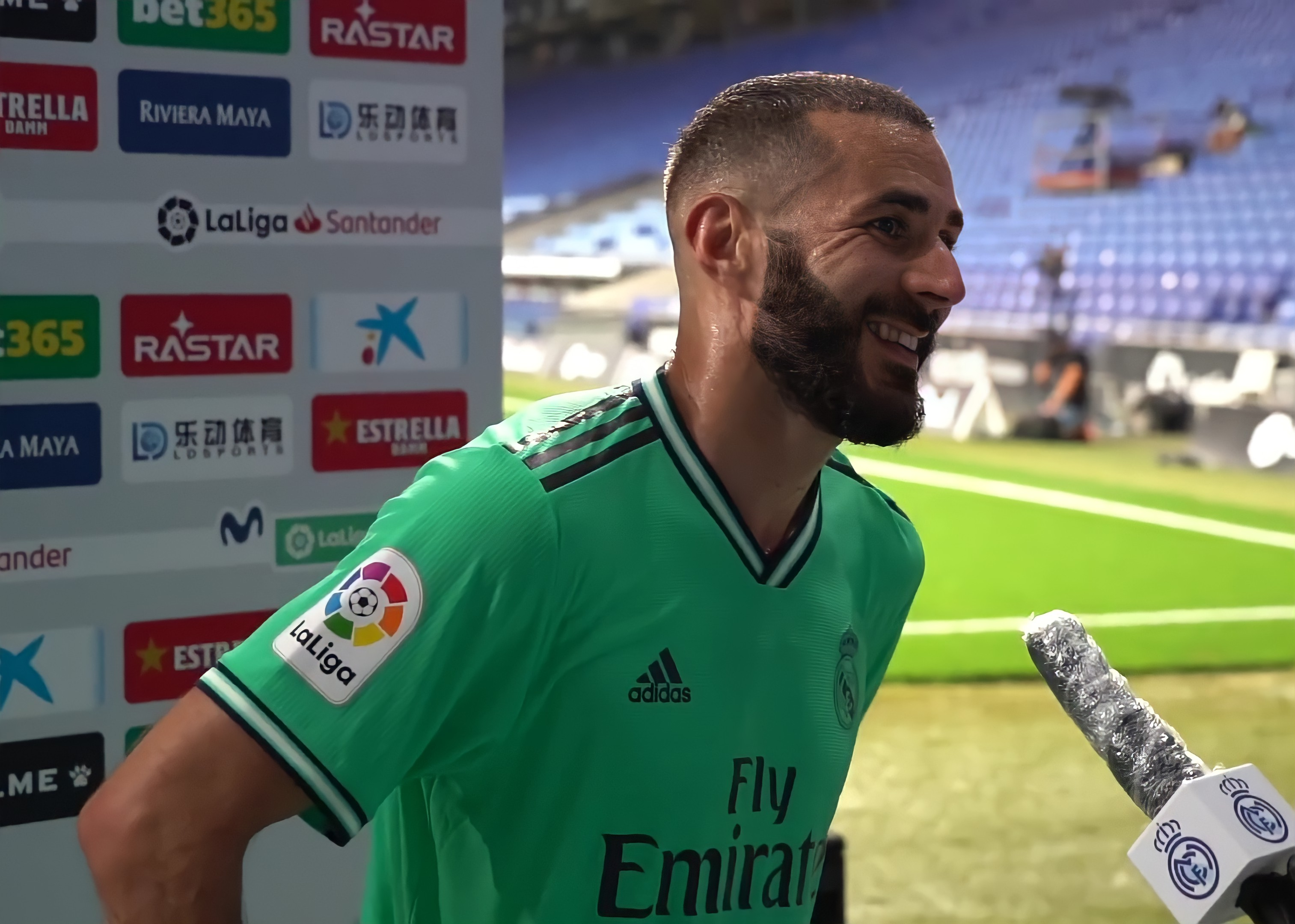
Benzema getting interviewed after Real Madrid's first away game after the COVID-19 quarantine against Real Sociedad

When La Liga restarted after a three-month hiatus due to the COVID-19 pandemic, Benzema scored a brace against Valencia in Real Madrid's second game back at the Alfredo Di Stéfano Stadium on 18 June – his first goals at Madrid's new temporary home ground. Benzema's brace saw him surpass Ferenc Puskás as Real Madrid's fourth All-Time Top Scorer with 304 goals.

On 16 July, Benzema's brace against Villarreal secured Real Madrid's 34th La Liga title, after a 2–1 win at the Di Stefano – their 10th consecutive league win after the lockdown. On 7 August, Benzema scored Madrid's only goal at the Etihad as they went crashing out of the Champions League to Manchester City (2–4 on aggregate) to end the campaign. For the second consecutive season, Benzema finished as the club's top scorer with 27 goals in all competitions.

Benzema opened his goal account for 2020–21 on 4 October, away to Levante in La Liga, netting his 250th goal for Real Madrid in all competitions. On 27 October, he scored an acrobatic over-the-head goal in a 2–2 draw against Borussia Mönchengladbach at Borussia-Park in the Champions League, to become the second player in history after Lionel Messi to score in 16 consecutive Champions League seasons. On 9 December, he scored a brace in a 2–0 win over Borussia Mönchengladbach to send Real Madrid to the Champions League knockout stages as group winners. On 21 April, Benzema scored a brace and assisted another in a 3–0 away win at Cádiz, which meant he scored against all 35 teams he has played against in La Liga.

==== 2021–22: Vice-captaincy, fourth league title, UCL top scorer and Ballon d'Or ====
With the departure of Sergio Ramos to PSG, Benzema was promoted as Real Madrid's vice-captain for the 2021–22 season under Ancelotti. On 14 August, Benzema scored a brace against Alaves as Los Blancos kicked off the league season with a 1–4 away win to sit at the top of the table. Benzema's first half volley was the first official goal under Ancelotti in his second stint. Six days later, Benzema signed a contract extension with Real Madrid, keeping him at the club until 2023.

Benzema scored his first hat-trick in three seasons in a 5–2 win over Celta Vigo on 12 September as Madrid returned to the Bernabeu for the first time since March 2020. Wearing the armband, Benzema was the first Madrid captain to score a hat-trick since Raul in 2008. One week later, Benzema and Vini Jr would combine twice in the last few minutes against Valencia at the Mestalla to complete a comeback to earn Madrid their first win at the Mestalla in four seasons. On 22 September, Benzema scored a brace and provided another two assists in a 6–1 win over Mallorca at the Bernabeu. Benzema's brace allowed him to become only the fourth Madrid player in history to score 200 La Liga goals after Di Stefano, Raul and Cristiano Ronaldo. On 28 September, Benzema became the first the player in history to score in 17 consecutive Champions League seasons after scoring his first penalty in the competition in a 1–2 home loss against Sheriff in the group stage.

On 22 October, Benzema scored Madrid's 1000th Champions League goal at the Bernabéu against Shakhtar Donetsk. In the process, Benzema scored his 291st and 292nd goals for the club, making him their fourth highest all-time top scorer, overtaking Santillana. With his goal against Sevilla in La Liga on 28 November, he became the highest French goalscorer in club football matches, overtaking Thierry Henry. On 8 January, Benzema scored his 300th goal for Madrid, converting a penalty in a 4–1 win at home in La Liga against Valencia.

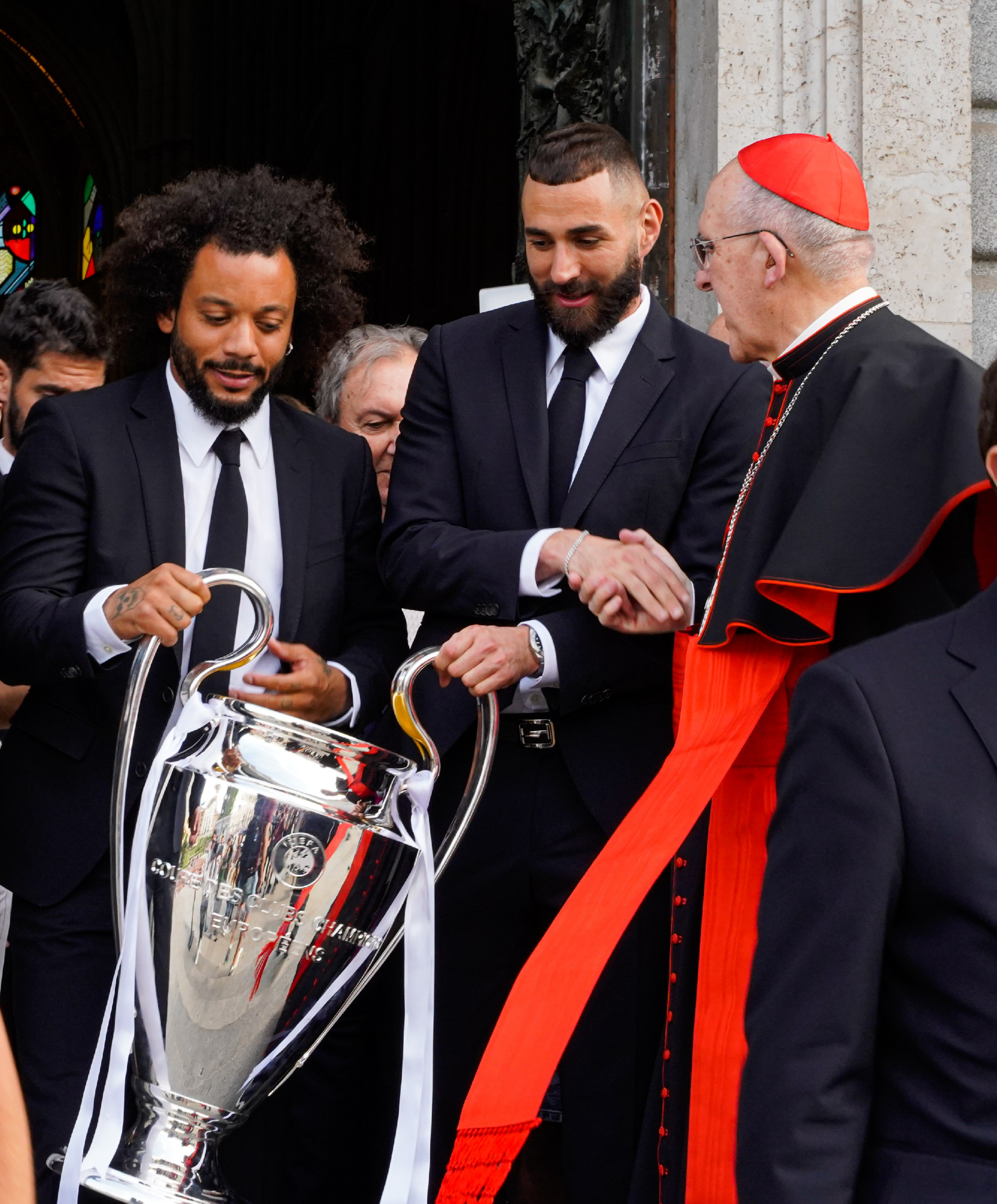
Left to right: Marcelo, Benzema and Carlos Osoro Sierra with the UEFA Champions League trophy in 2022 at the Virgin of Almudena

On 9 March, he scored a hat-trick within 17 minutes in a remarkable comeback against Paris Saint-Germain in the Champions League round of 16. At the age of 34, Benzema became the oldest player to score a hat-trick in the Champions League era. With the three goals, Benzema brought his tally to 309, overtaking Alfredo Di Stéfano as Real Madrid's third-highest all-time goalscorer. On 14 March, Benzema scored a brace in a La Liga match against Mallorca and broke Henry's record, becoming all-time top French goalscorer with 413 goals. On 6 April, he scored another hat-trick in the Champions League in a 3–1 away win over Chelsea in the first leg of the quarter-finals. Benzema became only the second player (after Cristiano Ronaldo) to score back-to-back hat-tricks in successive Champions League knockout matches. One week later in the second leg at the Santiago Bernabéu, Benzema scored a 96th minute header in extra time which proved pivotal, as Madrid lost to Chelsea 2–3 on the night but qualified for the semi-finals 5–4 on aggregate.

On 30 April 2022, he helped Real clinch their 35th Spanish title with a goal in a 4–0 win against Espanyol at the Bernabéu. On 4 May, he scored a decisive goal from the penalty spot in extra time in the second leg against Manchester City and helped Real Madrid reach their 17th European Cup final. By the end of the 2021–22 La Liga season, Benzema won his first Pichichi Trophy with 27 goals in 32 matches. On 28 May, he won his fifth Champions League title after a 1–0 win over Liverpool in the final, and finished the tournament as top scorer with 15 goals in total. On 31 May, Benzema was named the inaugural Champions League player of the season. On 13 August, he was nominated for the Ballon d'Or, widely considered a favourite to win it. In recognition of his performances that season, Benzema was awarded the Ballon d'Or on 17 October.

==== 2022–23: Captaincy, all-time second top scorer and departure ====
With the departure of Marcelo, Benzema was promoted to captain as the most senior member of the squad. By scoring in the 2022 UEFA Super Cup against Eintracht Frankfurt on 10 August 2022, Benzema brought his tally to 324 goals, overtaking Raúl as Real Madrid's all-time second-highest goalscorer.

On 21 February 2023, Benzema scored a brace and grabbed an assist in a 5–2 comeback victory against Liverpool in the Champions League last 16 first leg. He then scored the only goal in the return leg 3 weeks later. On 2 April 2023, Benzema scored a hat-trick in 6 minutes and 30 seconds in a 6–0 win over Real Valladolid, to become the third fastest hat-trick scorer in his club's history in La Liga, only behind Pahiño who netted three goals in 4 minutes in 1950 and Fernando Hierro who scored them in 6 minutes in 1992. Just three days later, he scored a back-to-back hat-trick in a 4–0 away victory against Barcelona in the Copa del Rey semi-finals, to become the second Real Madrid player to achieve this feat in El Clásico after Iván Zamorano in 1995 and the second Real Madrid player to score a hat-trick at the Camp Nou after Ferenc Puskás in 1963. On 6 May, Benzema was part of the team that won against Osasuna in the Copa del Rey final, thus matching Marcelo's record as the club's most decorated player with 25 trophies.

On 4 June, Real Madrid confirmed that Benzema would depart from the club following the conclusion of the 2022–23 season. Benzema was given a rapturous reception by Madrid fans in his last game against Athletic Bilbao, in which he scored. Benzema was substituted for Luka Modric in the 74th minute, leaving the field to an ovation from the Madrid supporters.

=== Al-Ittihad ===
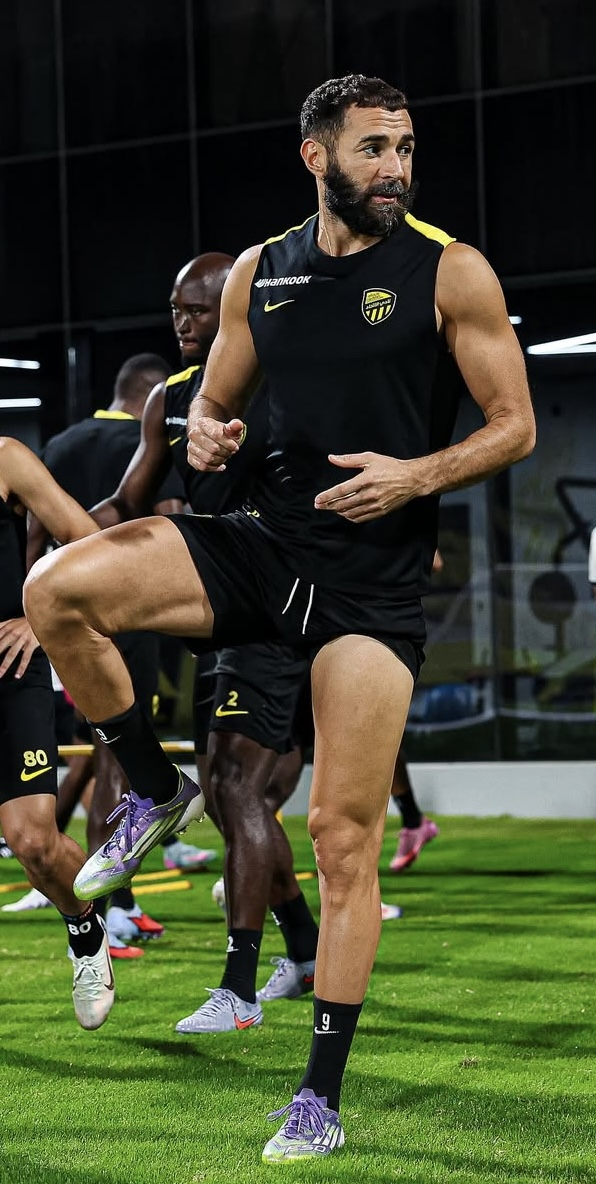
Benzema during a training with Al-Ittihad in August 2025

On 6 June 2023, Saudi Professional League club Al-Ittihad announced the signing of Benzema on a free transfer. His contract stipulates that he can receive up to $100 million USD a year up until 2026. Two days later, Al-Ittihad formally presented him as their new signing at an elaborate ceremony. This event, hosted at the King Abdullah Sports City, was attended by a large number of fans.

==== 2023–24: Debut season and club captaincy ====
Benzema scored a goal and provided an assist on his debut on 27 July in a 2–1 victory over Espérance de Tunis during the Arab Club Champions Cup. In August 2023, he was made the club captain for Al-Ittihad. After his first season, Al-Ittihad finished in fifth place in the league with Benzema scoring 13 goals with 8 assists in 29 matches. The disappointing campaign led to a change in managerial position for the club, one of three changes in succession. Later on, he was reunited with his former French manager from 2010 to 2012, with Laurent Blanc being appointed manager before the 2024–25 season.

==== 2024–25: Domestic double ====
For the 2024–25 Al-Ittihad Club season, Benzema clinched the league title on 15 May, scoring 21 goals in 28 games all the while contributing to 30 goals that season when the club won the league after achieving 77 points. Not only did the team win the league title, Benzema captained Al-Ittihad to the domestic double, beating Al Qadsiah in the 2025 Saudi King's Cup Final in the King Abdullah Sports City in Jeddah. As well as the team trophies, Benzema won the individual award of player of the season in the league.

==== 2025–26: Mid-season departure ====
On 30 August 2025, Benzema netted a hat-trick in a 5–2 win over Al-Okhdood, bringing his career tally past the 500-goal milestone. In late January 2026, he reportedly refused to play for Al‑Ittihad due to a contract dispute, specifically rejecting an extension offer that reportedly included no base salary and relied largely on image rights, which he and his camp found disrespectful.

=== Al-Hilal ===
On the final day of 2025–26 winter transfer window, Benzema completed a move to fellow Saudi Pro League club Al Hilal on a free transfer, signing a contract until 2027. Three days later, he netted a hat-trick on his debut in a 6–0 away win over Al-Okhdood. He won his first title with the club by achieving the 2025–26 King's Cup. On 31 August 2026, his contract with the club was terminated by mutual consent.

== International career ==
=== Youth ===
Benzema is a former France youth international having earned caps at all levels for which he was eligible, excluding the under-16 team. He is a member of the group, commonly known in France as the Génération 1987, a youth class that produced current internationals Hatem Ben Arfa, Jérémy Ménez and Samir Nasri, alongside himself. Benzema was the last of the four to make his youth international debut under coach Philippe Bergeroo and officially joined the team ahead of the 2004 UEFA European Under-17 Championship that was played on home soil. In the competition, he appeared in two matches. On his tournament debut, Benzema scored the opening goal in a 3–1 win over Northern Ireland. His lone other appearance in the competition was in a 1–0 group stage win over Spain as France went on to win the tournament defeated the same team in the final.

Benzema was a regular starter in the team at under-18 level. He made his debut with the team at a local tournament in the Czech Republic. Benzema scored his first goal at under-18 level in the competition against Poland in the team's final group stage match. In the final against the hosts, he scored the opening goal in a 2–0 win as France were declared champions of the competition. On 30 September 2004, Benzema was one of three goalscorers in France's 3–0 away win over Norway. In the team's next match against Russia, he scored a double in a 3–1 victory. Due to France winning the 2004 U17 European title, the under-18 team was allowed participation in the 2005 Meridian Cup. Benzema was called up to the team for the competition and played in all four matches, scoring a tournament-high five goals as France were crowned champions of the tournament. He opened the tournament by scoring two goals in a 7–0 victory over Cameroon. After going scoreless in the team's next match against Sierra Leone, Benzema responded by scoring a goal in a shutout victory over Nigeria and netting another double in a 4–1 win against Egypt. On 19 May 2005, in the team's final match of the season against Slovakia, Benzema scored all four goals in a 4–1 victory. He finished the under-18 campaign with 18 appearances and a team-high 14 goals and was, subsequently, praised by Bergeroo who, following the campaign, declared that Benzema was "quite efficient".

The foursome of Benzema, Ben Arfa, Ménez and Nasri returned to international play together for under-19 duty. The four were joined by Issiar Dia, Blaise Matuidi and Serge Gakpé with the objective of winning the 2006 UEFA European Under-19 Championship. The team opened the campaign with two friendly matches against Norway. Over the course of the two matches, Benzema scored one goal, which came in the first match, a 4–0 win. In the first round of qualification for the UEFA-sanctioned tournament, he scored his only goal in the final group match against Austria. France won the match 2–0, which resulted in the team progressing to the Elite Round. In the ensuing round, France were placed in a relatively easy group alongside Scotland, Bulgaria, and Belarus. In the opening group game against Bulgaria, Benzema scored a double converting a penalty and scoring in play as France won 4–0. Both of his goals were scored within a minute of each other. After surprisingly drawing 0–0 with Belarus, France faced Scotland in the final group stage match. Benzema opened the scoring in the 11th minute, but his goal was cancelled out by Steven Fletcher in the second half. The match ultimately finished 1–1 and, despite finishing the round undefeated, France were eliminated after being beaten on points by the Scots.

Benzema made his under-21 debut for Les Espoirs under coach René Girard in the team's first match following the 2006 UEFA European Under-21 Championship against Belgium. He started the match and was replaced at half-time by Yoann Gourcuff. He featured in qualification matches for the 2007 UEFA European Under-21 Championship and appeared as a starter and substitute in the first leg and second leg, respectively, of the team's surprising defeat to Israel in the qualifying playoffs. Despite still being eligible to represent the under-21 team until 2009, his appearance in the second leg defeat to Israel was Benzema's last with the team and he finished his under-21 career with five appearances and no goals. Prior to representing France at senior international level, Benzema was courted by the Algerian Football Federation (FAF) who sought for the player to represent Algeria at senior international level. In December 2006, the striker was approached by former federation president Hamid Haddadj and then-national team coach Jean-Michel Cavalli, but turned down the invitation citing his desire to continue his international career with France. Benzema later told French radio station Radio Monte Carlo "Algeria is my parents' country and it is in my heart, but football-wise, I will only play for the French national team".

=== Senior ===
==== Euro 2008 ====
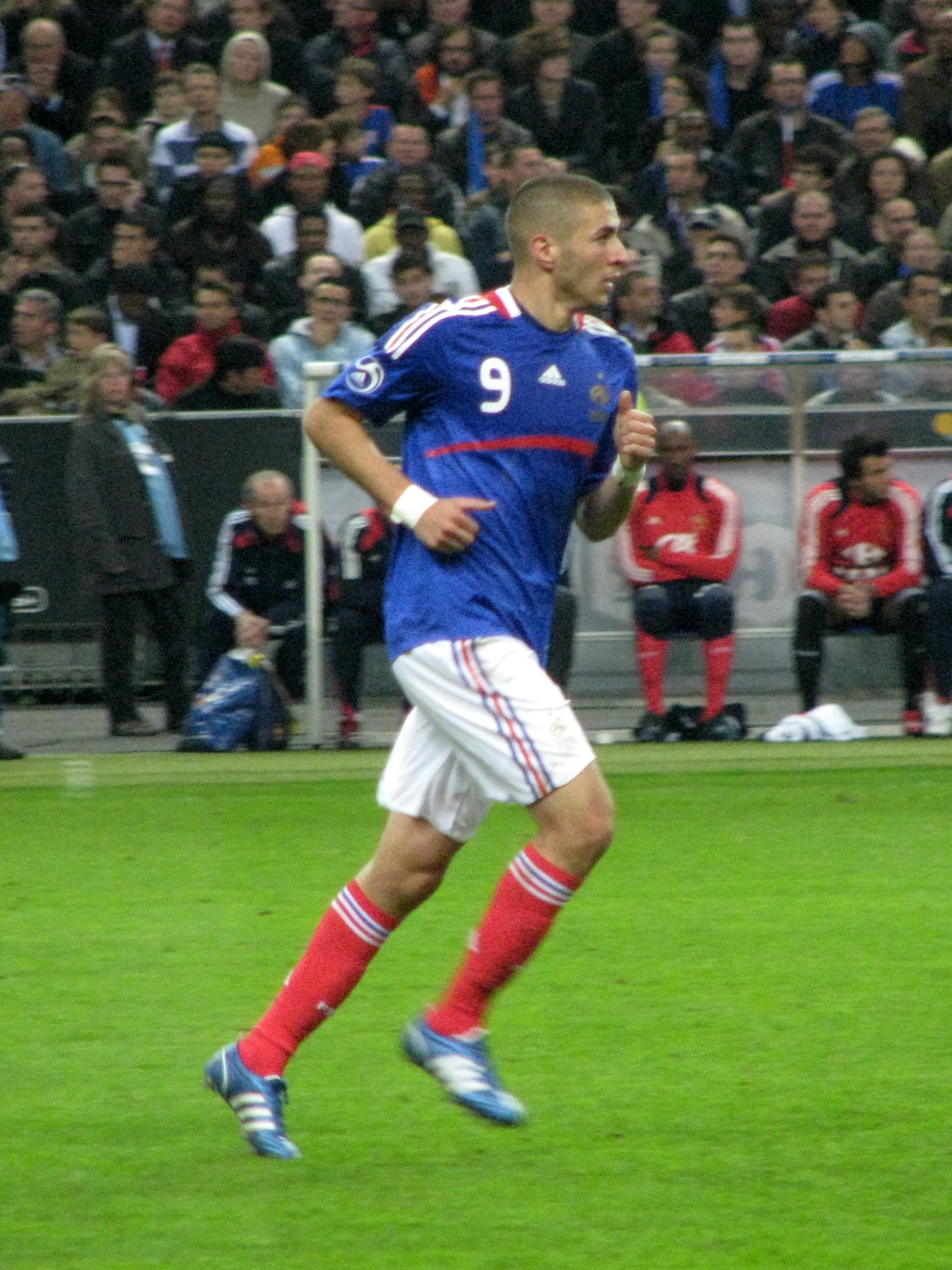
Benzema playing for France in 2008

Benzema was called up for the first time to the senior national team by Raymond Domenech on 9 November 2006 for the team's friendly match against Greece that would be played on 15 November. Benzema described the call-up as "a reward", while also stating "I am pleased, of course, me and my family. A (the senior national team), is the national team's highest honor". Two days before the match, he was forced to withdraw from the team due to a thigh injury, which he suffered while playing domestically for Lyon. After failing to make the squad for the team's February 2007 match against Argentina, Benzema returned to the team in March for a UEFA Euro 2008 qualifying match against Lithuania and a friendly against Austria. After failing to appear in the qualifier, he made his international debut on 28 March 2007 against Austria. Benzema appeared as a half-time substitute for Djibril Cissé and scored the only goal of the match after a free-kick from Samir Nasri. On 13 October, Benzema scored a double in a 6–0 win against the Faroe Islands. After appearing regularly in the team for the rest of the 2007–08 season, he was named to the 23-man squad to participate in UEFA Euro 2008.

Benzema made his debut in the competition on 9 June 2008 in the team's opening match against Romania. Benzema started the match, but was substituted out for Nasri in the second half after a frustrating performance. The match finished 0–0 and Benzema was, subsequently, criticized by the French media for his performance with newspaper Le Point declaring that Benzema was "unrecognizable" and that he "symbolized the impotence of France in the attack". The newspaper also cited his lack of international experience for his subdued performance. In the team's next group game against the Netherlands, Benzema played no part in the 4–1 defeat. He returned to the team in its final group game against Italy and was given a place in the starting lineup. However, France lost 2–0 and were eliminated from the competition.

In November 2008, Benzema, among several other young players in the team, was accused of being insolent during the team's campaign at the European Championship. The accusation came from international teammate William Gallas who inserted the charge in his autobiography. Though most of Gallas' accusations were directed at Nasri, during the competition, it was reported by newspaper Le Parisien that several of the national team players described Benzema as "arrogant" and that the striker was scolded by midfielder Claude Makélélé following the team's loss to the Netherlands.

==== 2010 World Cup omission ====
Despite the reports from after Euro 2008, Benzema remained a regular in the team and, ahead of qualification for the 2010 FIFA World Cup, switched to the number ten shirt after previously wearing the number nine. In the team's first match following its elimination from Euro 2008, Benzema scored a goal in a 3–2 friendly win over Sweden in Gothenburg. Two months later, he scored another goal in a 3–1 victory against Tunisia at the Stade de France. On 5 June 2009, Benzema converted the only goal of the match, a penalty shot, in a 1–0 win over Turkey at the Stade de Gerland, his home stadium. He scored his first World Cup qualification goals in victories over the Faroe Islands and Austria in October 2009. His cap against Austria would be his last of the Domenech era as he failed to make France's preliminary 30-man squad for the World Cup. Domenech cited Benzema's struggle for form with his new club Real Madrid, rather than his alleged involvement in a sex scandal as his reason for leaving the striker out. Prior to the list being unveiled, Benzema informed Radio Monte Carlo that if he was not selected he would be "very disappointed, but not killed" and "I will support the France team no matter what".

==== Euro 2012 ====
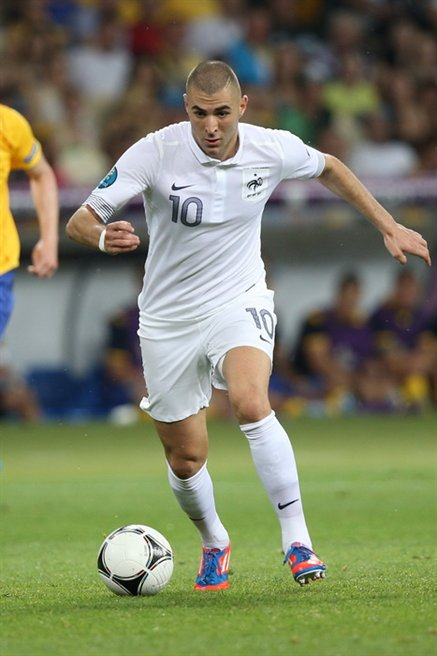
Benzema playing for France at UEFA Euro 2012

Following the World Cup, Benzema returned to the national team under the reign of new coach Laurent Blanc. Blanc, an admirer of Benzema, sought to build the attack around the striker and, after going almost a year without representing France, Benzema made his return to the team in its 2–1 defeat to Norway in Oslo. Alongside Gourcuff, Benzema led the team in scoring in qualifying for UEFA Euro 2012, netting three. He scored his three goals in wins over Bosnia and Herzegovina, Luxembourg, and Albania. On 17 November 2010, Benzema scored the opening goal in France's 2–1 win over England at Wembley Stadium. In the team's next match against Brazil in February 2011, he scored the only goal for France in a 1–0 win. After appearing regularly in qualifying for Euro 2012, on 29 May 2012, Benzema was named to the squad to participate in the competition. On 5 June, in the team's final warm-up friendly ahead of the European Championship, Benzema scored two goals in a 4–0 shutout win over Estonia. At Euro 2012, Benzema started the team's opening match against England, which ended in a 1–1 draw. In the team's ensuing group stage match against Ukraine, he assisted both the goals in a 2–0 win.

==== 2014 World Cup ====
On 11 October 2013, Benzema scored his first goal for the France national team since June 2012 in a friendly against Australia, thus ending a scoring drought for his national team which had lasted 1,222 minutes. In that match played at the Parc des Princes in Paris, which France won 6–0, Benzema scored France's sixth and final goal in the 50th minute after turning home Franck Ribéry's left-wing cross. In the second leg of the 2014 World Cup qualification play-off against Ukraine held on 19 November 2013 at the Stade de France, Benzema scored France's second goal in the 34th minute to level the aggregate score at 2–2. Benzema scored his goal when he side-footed home after a huge scramble in the Ukrainian penalty box, although he was shown on television replays to be offside by almost one metre when the ball took a final touch off Mathieu Valbuena's chest. Benzema had four minutes earlier been denied a legitimate goal, the offside flag wrongly raised when he turned in Ribéry's low cross into the net with his torso a metre from the Ukrainian goal-line. Ukraine had won the first leg of the play-off 2–0 in Kyiv just four days earlier. France would eventually win the second leg 3–0 to advance to the 2014 World Cup finals in Brazil with a 3–2 aggregate scoreline.

On 6 June 2014, Benzema was named in France's squad for the 2014 FIFA World Cup, making his debut in the tournament. In the team's first match, a 3–0 win against Honduras in Porto Alegre on 15 June, he scored a goal in each half, the first from a penalty kick. He also took part in the team's second goal, when his shot rebounded off the post and was fumbled over the goal-line by Honduran goalkeeper Noel Valladares for an own goal, the first World Cup goal given by goal-line technology. He was named by FIFA as man of the match for his performance. In the second group fixture, he scored and had a penalty saved in a 5–2 defeat of Switzerland, as Les Bleus all but secured qualification to the knockout stage. France were later knocked out by eventual winners Germany in the quarter-final stage of the tournament.

==== 2016–2020 exclusion ====
After last featuring for France in a 4–0 win against Armenia on 8 October 2015, French Football Federation announced on 13 April 2016 that Benzema would not be picked for Euro 2016 tournament on home soil. This happened after a blackmailing affair involving fellow French team player Mathieu Valbuena (see §Controversies and legal issues). He responded on 1 June 2016 in Marca, in an interview entitled 'Benzema: "Deschamps folded due to pressure from France's racist element"'.

Benzema was also left off the roster for the 2018 World Cup in Russia. Directing his frustration at FFF president Noël Le Graët, Benzema later tweeted: "Mr Le Graët, with all due respect, you've lost an opportunity to remain silent. I've discovered your true face, and this isn't the one that said he appreciated me and wouldn't discuss the subject of team selections!"

In November 2019, Benzema replied to Le Graët's comments that his career with France was over, by saying: "If you think I'm done, let me play with one of the other countries I am eligible for and we'll see".

==== Return to the squad, Nations League victory and retirement ====
On 18 May 2021, following speculation from the media, Benzema was officially included in France's 26-man squad for UEFA Euro 2020, his first call-up to the national team in over five years. He made his first appearance since his return on 2 June, in a 3–0 home win over Wales, in a friendly warm-up match before the final tournament, during which he missed a penalty, but was later also involved in the final goal scored by Antoine Griezmann. On 23 June 2021, he scored a brace in a 2–2 draw against Portugal, to be his first goals in the European Championship. He subsequently scored another brace in France's round-of-16 match against Switzerland, where France were knocked out of the tournament on penalties after a 3–3 draw. With four goals in as many games, Benzema won the Euro 2020 bronze boot.

In the 2021 UEFA Nations League semi-final on 7 October, Benzema scored France's first goal in the second half as they came from behind to defeat Belgium 3–2. He overtook Zidane in the France scoring records as he scored his 32nd goal for Le Blues to become the 6th top scorer in their history. In the Final three days later, he scored the temporary equaliser as France went on to clinch the title for the first time with a 2–1 victory over Spain; he was named "Player of the Match" by UEFA for his performance in the final. With two goals, he was the joint–top scorer of the Nations League Finals, along with Spain's Ferran Torres and teammate Kylian Mbappé, who won the top scorer trophy due to having also provided two assists – Benzema won the bronze boot due to playing more minutes than Torres. The Nations League was Benzema's first trophy with France's senior team and his 27th of his career, making him the most decorated Frenchman in football history.

On 13 November 2021, Benzema scored his first goals in the 2022 World Cup qualifiers with a brace in an 8–0 win over Kazakhstan as France booked their place for Qatar 2022. His brace saw him over-take David Trezeguet to become Les Bleus' fifth all-time top scorer with 35 goals. Although he was included in France's final squad for the 2022 FIFA World Cup, on 19 November, the French Football Federation stated that Benzema would be forced to miss the tournament due to a thigh injury. Despite not taking part in the tournament, Benzema was still awarded the silver medal as he was not replaced by another player unlike Christopher Nkunku, who was replaced by Randal Kolo Muani. On 19 December, Benzema announced his retirement from the national team.

== Style of play ==
Generally known for both his finishing and playmaking, Benzema is regarded as one of the best strikers of all time. He is a creative, skillful, quick, agile, and prolific forward, who is good in the air and capable of playing off the shoulders of the last defender, and has been described as an "immensely talented striker" who is "strong and powerful" and "a potent finisher from inside the box" with either foot, as well as his head, despite being naturally right footed. He is considered to be one of the best strikers of his generation, with his Real Madrid manager Ancelotti describing him "the best striker in the world" in 2021.

An atypical number 9, although he is usually deployed as a centre forward, and can operate as an out-and-out striker, Benzema is also capable of playing in several other offensive positions, and has been used on the wing, or even as a playmaker behind the main striker, either in the number 10 role as an attacking midfielder, or as a deep-lying forward. In addition to his goalscoring, Benzema is known for his willingness and ability to drop into deeper or wider positions, and either link-up play with midfielders, or use his strength and technical ability to hold up the ball with his back to goal to provide assists for teammates, courtesy of his vision, creativity, passing, and eye for the final ball; (Note: See) his playing style led one commentator to describe him as a "nine and a half". Highlighting his prolific goalscoring and his creative abilities, Benzema ranks as Madrid's all-time second-highest goalscorer and top assist provider, with 328 goals and 104 assists respectively.

During his time at Madrid, Benzema has also been praised by pundits for his work-rate and tactical intelligence off the ball, as well as his positional sense and attacking movement as a forward, which often draws opposing defenders out of position, and in turn creates spaces for his teammates; as such, he formed a strong offensive partnership with Cristiano Ronaldo during the latter's time with the club. Indeed, Benzema's movement drew defenders away and created space for Ronaldo to make attacking runs into the centre of the area from the left wing, which essentially saw the Frenchman act as a false 9. (Note: See) Following Ronaldo's departure in 2018, he took on a new role as the club's main striker, playing with his back to goal less frequently, and instead receiving the ball facing the goal and taking more touches inside the penalty area; in this position, he also often drifted out wide onto the left flank, while he was able to utilise his control and touch on the ball effectively to create goalscoring opportunities for himself inside the box. The positional change saw an increase in his goalscoring output for the club and an improvement in his shooting, for which he had occasionally come under criticism from the press in the past, as demonstrated by the variety of his goals, his conversion rate, and his clinical finishing with his feet as well as his head; however, in addition to taking over the role of the team's main goalscorer, he also still continued to serve as link-up player for the team's front line by creating chances for his teammates.

== Other ventures ==
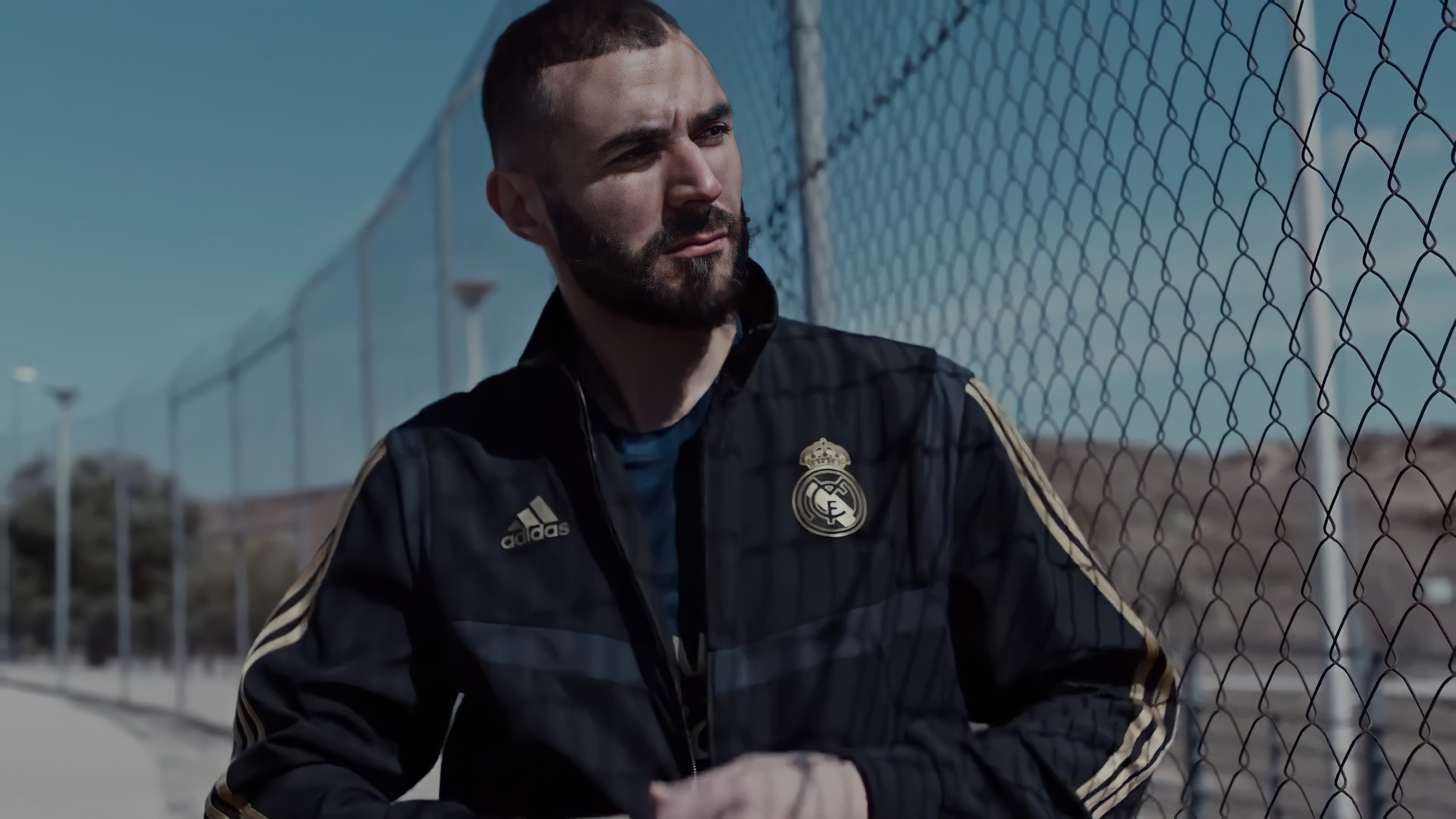
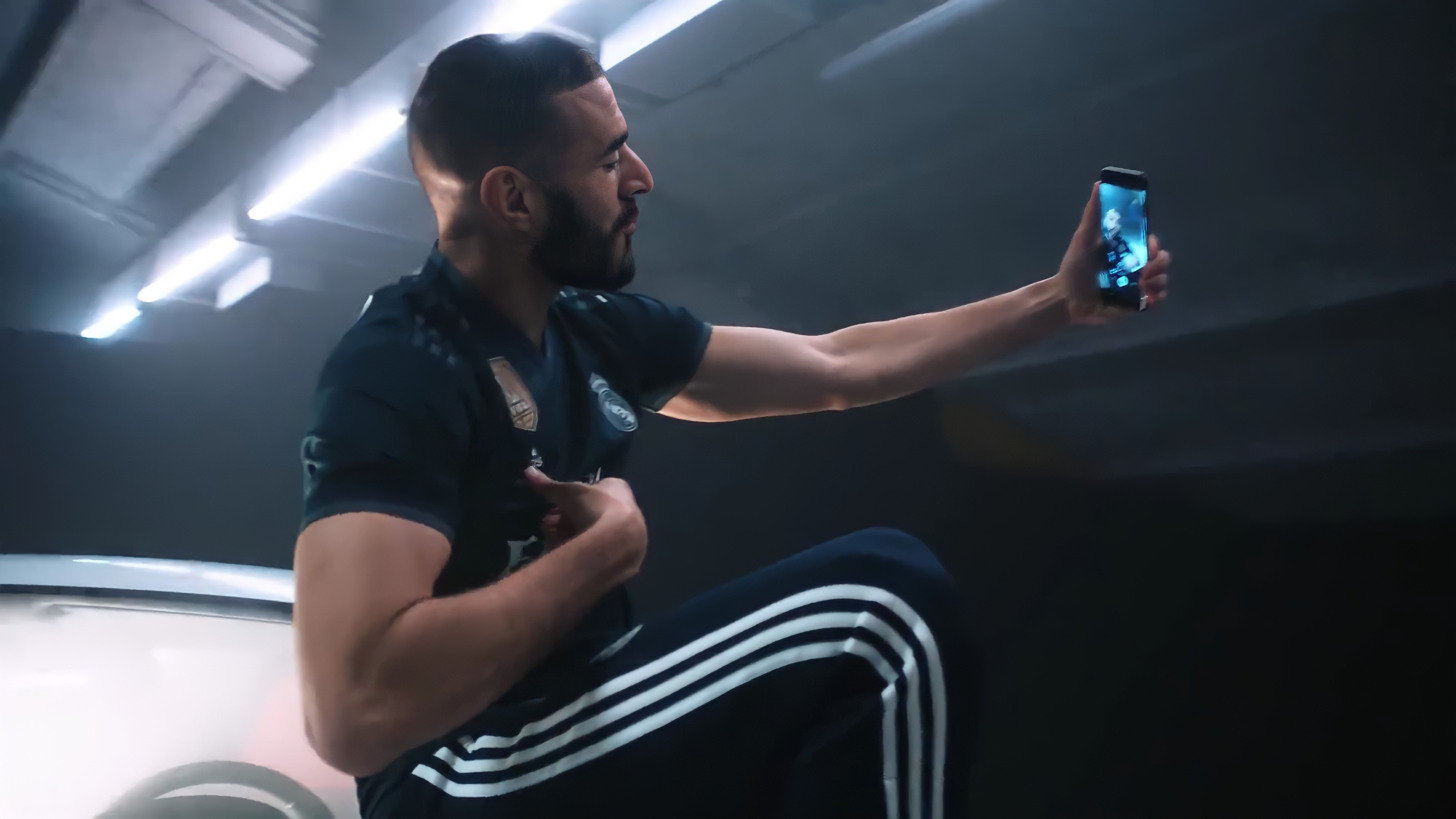
Benzema in an Adidas music video (above) and a commercial (below) for Real Madrid in 2019 and 2018, respectively

Since evolving internationally, Benzema has participated in numerous advertising campaigns. He was chosen as an ambassador of the American video game publisher Electronic Arts for the FIFA series. He has signed several sponsorship contracts, notably with the Korean automobile manufacturer Hyundai, the French telephone operator SFR and its subsidiary BuzzMobile, the French bank LCL and the sports betting company bwin. Benzema is sponsored by Adidas. In 2017, his documentary film Le K Benzema was released. In 2020, Benzema started his own YouTube channel, uploading videos of his everyday life, as well as interviews and fan Q&As. In 2022, Benzema was named official ambassador of the Fendi Faster sneaker line.

== Personal life ==
=== Religion ===
A practicing Muslim, Benzema observes fasting during the Islamic holy month of Ramadan. He has spoken about his faith saying: "My faith helps me to be focused every day. It brings me benefits and it's my strength for me, my family, as well as for my work – for literally everything."

=== Relationships and children ===
On 3 February 2014, his then-girlfriend Chloé de Launay gave birth to their daughter Mélia in Madrid. On 5 May 2017, his girlfriend Cora Gauthier gave birth to their son Ibrahim. Benzema started dating American model Jordan Ozuna in 2022, and confirmed their relationship on Instagram. Ozuna is the mother of Benzema's fourth child. In 2023, Ozuna converted to Islam. Benzema began dating French-Algerian actress Lyna Khoudri in 2025, making their relationship public at the Cannes Film Festival. The couple married later that year, in July, in Corsica.

=== Advocacy ===
In October 2023, Benzema expressed solidarity with the victims of Israeli airstrikes in Gaza.

=== Legal ===
On 6 December 2006, he told RMC about his possible selection for the Algerian team: "It's my parents' country, it's in my heart. But well, from a sporting perspective, it's true I'll play in the French team. I'll always be available for the French team [...] It's more for the sporting side, because Algeria is my country, you see, my parents come from there. France, on the other hand ... it's more of a sport thing, that's it." Benzema drew some criticism for these comments, as well as for his reluctance to sing the French national anthem, "La Marseillaise", before each match with the national team.

On 18 April 2010, French television channel M6 reported that four members of the France national team were being investigated for their roles as clients in a prostitute ring operated inside of a Paris nightclub, with some of the women possibly being underage. The players were eventually revealed to be Franck Ribéry, Sidney Govou, Hatem Ben Arfa and Benzema. Benzema was alleged to have had a sexual rendezvous in May 2008 with a prostitute when she was 16 years of age, an act Benzema denied through his lawyer. On 20 July, Benzema was questioned by Paris police and indicted on the charge of "solicitation of a minor prostitute". In November 2011, prosecutors asked for the cases against Ribéry and Benzema to be dropped, saying that the players were not aware that the escort, identified as Zahia Dehar, was 16 years old. However, the case did go on to trial. The first hearing was held in June 2013. In January 2014, the judge in the case dropped the charges against both Ribery and Benzema saying there was lack of sufficient evidence that the pair knew the prostitute was underaged, even assuming the alleged encounters had taken place. Benzema maintained that no such encounter had occurred.

On 4 November 2015, Benzema was arrested by French police for his alleged part in blackmailing fellow France international player Mathieu Valbuena over the alleged recording of a sex tape on a mobile phone. During the investigation over the blackmail plot, French Prime Minister Manuel Valls stated, "A great athlete should be exemplary. If he is not, he has no place in the France team. There are so many kids, so many youngsters in our suburbs that relate to great athletes. They wear the blue jersey, the colours of France, which are so important in these moments." On 10 December 2015, the president of the FFF Noël Le Graët announced the provisional suspension of the striker from the French team until a new development in the affair. On 17 February 2016, the judicial review was lifted by the investigating judge who allowed Benzema to get in touch again with Valbuena. On 11 July 2017, the Court of Cassation issued a judgment in which it invalidated a decision of the Court of Appeal of Versailles, which had validated the procedure by which Benzema had been indicted for complicity of attempted blackmail. This decision was made on the basis of contesting the legality of the phone calls recording by the police, and the judgement did not disprove the veracity of the blackmail attempt on Valbuena by Benzema. On 7 January 2021, the public prosecutor's office in Versailles announced that Benzema would face trial for his alleged involvement in the blackmail attempt. On 24 November 2021, Benzema was found guilty of conspiring to blackmail Valbuena with a sex tape. The judge gave him a one-year suspended sentence and fined him €75,000. His lawyers said they would appeal his conviction. He was sentenced in this case in June 2022 to a one-year suspended sentence and a fine of £63,000, after having abandoned the appeal procedure. Benzema's lawyer indicated their intention to appeal the verdict.

In March 2020, during an Instagram livestream with YouTuber and internet personality Mohamed Henni, Benzema made controversial remarks about French player Olivier Giroud, who replaced Benzema in the France national team. He called Giroud "karting" while he referred to himself as "Formula 1". On 10 March 2023, France head coach Didier Deschamps stated in an interview with Le Parisien that he had told Benzema following his injury prior to the 2022 FIFA World Cup that there was "no emergency" and that he could "organize his return" from injury with the team manager. Deschamps then claimed that Benzema made the decision to leave the France team himself, saying "when I woke up, I learned that he had left". However, Benzema responded on his Instagram story by reposting the Deschamps statement in the interview with the caption "but what audacity". He posted a further story of French Snapchat personality Ritchie repeating the phrase "liar, you are a liar".

== Career statistics ==
=== Club ===
As of match played 20 August 2026

Appearances and goals by club, season and competition
Club	Season	League			National cup (Note: Includes Coupe de France, Copa del Rey, King's Cup)		League cup (Note: Includes Coupe de la Ligue)		Continental		Other		Total	
Club	Season	Division	Apps	Goals	Apps	Goals	Apps	Goals	Apps	Goals	Apps	Goals	Apps	Goals
Lyon II	2004–05	CFA	11	10	—		—		—		—		11	10
Lyon II	2005–06	CFA	9	5	—		—		—		—		9	5
Lyon II	Total		20	15	—		—		—		—		20	15
Lyon	2004–05	Ligue 1	6	0	0	0	0	0	0	0	0	0	6	0
Lyon	2005–06	Ligue 1	13	1	2	2	0	0	1	1	0	0	16	4
Lyon	2006–07	Ligue 1	21	5	1	0	1	0	3 (Note: Appearance(s) in UEFA Champions League)	2	1 (Note: Appearance in Trophée des Champions)	1	27	8
Lyon	2007–08	Ligue 1	36	20	6	6	2	1	7	4	1	0	52	31
Lyon	2008–09	Ligue 1	36	17	2	1	0	0	8	5	1	0	47	23
Lyon	Total		112	43	11	9	3	1	19	12	3	1	148	66
Real Madrid	2009–10	La Liga	27	8	1	0	—		5	1	—		33	9
Real Madrid	2010–11	La Liga	33	15	7	5	—		8	6	—		48	26
Real Madrid	2011–12	La Liga	34	21	5	3	—		11	7	2 (Note: Appearance(s) in Supercopa de España)	1	52	32
Real Madrid	2012–13	La Liga	30	11	8	4	—		10	5	2	0	50	20
Real Madrid	2013–14	La Liga	35	17	6	2	—		11	5	—		52	24
Real Madrid	2014–15	La Liga	29	15	3	0	—		9	6	5 (Note: One appearance in UEFA Super Cup, two appearances in Supercopa de España, two appearances and one goal in FIFA Club World Cup)	1	46	22
Real Madrid	2015–16	La Liga	27	24	0	0	—		9	4	—		36	28
Real Madrid	2016–17	La Liga	29	11	3	1	—		13	5	3 (Note: One appearance in UEFA Super Cup, two appearances and two goals in FIFA Club World Cup)	2	48	19
Real Madrid	2017–18	La Liga	32	5	1	1	—		9	5	5 (Note: One appearance in UEFA Super Cup, two appearances and one goal in Supercopa de España, two appearances in FIFA Club World Cup)	1	47	12
Real Madrid	2018–19	La Liga	36	21	6	4	—		8	4	3 (Note: One appearance and one goal in UEFA Super Cup, two appearances in FIFA Club World Cup)	1	53	30
Real Madrid	2019–20	La Liga	37	21	3	1	—		8	5	0	0	48	27
Real Madrid	2020–21	La Liga	34	23	1	0	—		10	6	1	1	46	30
Real Madrid	2021–22	La Liga	32	27	0	0	—		12	15	2	2	46	44
Real Madrid	2022–23	La Liga	24	19	5	4	—		10	4	4 (Note: One appearance and one goal in UEFA Super Cup, two appearances and two goals in Supercopa de España, one appearance and one goal in FIFA Club World Cup)	4	43	31
Real Madrid	Total		439	238	49	25	—		133	78	27	13	648	354
Al-Ittihad	2023–24	Saudi Pro League	21	9	1	1	—		3 (Note: Appearances in AFC Champions League)	0	8 (Note: Four appearances and three goals in Arab Club Champions Cup, two appearances and two goals in FIFA Club World Cup, two appearances and one goal in Saudi Super Cup)	6	33	16
Al-Ittihad	2024–25	Saudi Pro League	29	21	4	4	—		—		—		33	25
Al-Ittihad	2025–26	Saudi Pro League	14	8	2	4	—		4 (Note: Appearance(s) in AFC Champions League Elite)	4	1 (Note: Appearance in Saudi Super Cup)	0	21	16
Al-Ittihad	Total		64	38	7	9	—		7	4	9	6	87	57
Al-Hilal	2025–26	Saudi Pro League	10	9	2	0	—		1	0	—		13	9
Al-Hilal	2026–27	Saudi Pro League	2	1	1	0	—		0	0	—		3	1
Al-Hilal	Total		12	10	3	0	—		1	0	—		16	10
Career total			647	344	70	43	3	1	160	94	39	20	919	502

=== International ===
Appearances and goals by national team and year
National team	Year	Apps	Goals
France	2007	8	3
France	2008	11	2
France	2009	8	3
France	2010	5	3
France	2011	10	2
France	2012	12	2
France	2013	10	3
France	2014	13	7
France	2015	4	2
France	2016	0	0
France	2017	0	0
France	2018	0	0
France	2019	0	0
France	2020	0	0
France	2021	13	9
France	2022	3	1
Total		97	37

Scores and results list France's goal tally first, score column indicates score after each Benzema goal

List of international goals scored by Karim Benzema
No.	Date	Venue	Cap	Opponent	Score	Result	Competition
1	28 March 2007	Stade de France, Saint-Denis, France	1	Austria	1–0	1–0	Friendly
2	13 October 2007	Tórsvøllur, Tórshavn, Faroe Islands	5	Faroe Islands	3–0	6–0	UEFA Euro 2008 qualifying
3	13 October 2007	Tórsvøllur, Tórshavn, Faroe Islands	5	Faroe Islands	5–0	6–0	UEFA Euro 2008 qualifying
4	20 August 2008	Ullevi, Gothenburg, Sweden	14	Sweden	1–1	3–2	Friendly
5	14 October 2008	Stade de France, Saint-Denis, France	18	Tunisia	3–1	3–1	Friendly
6	5 June 2009	Stade de Gerland, Lyon, France	24	Turkey	1–0	1–0	Friendly
7	10 October 2009	Stade de Roudourou, Guingamp, France	26	Faroe Islands	5–0	5–0	2010 FIFA World Cup qualification
8	14 October 2009	Stade de France, Saint-Denis, France	27	Austria	1–0	3–1	2010 FIFA World Cup qualification
9	7 September 2010	Koševo City Stadium, Sarajevo, Bosnia and Herzegovina	29	Bosnia and Herzegovina	1–0	2–0	UEFA Euro 2012 qualifying
10	12 October 2010	Stade Saint-Symphorien, Metz, France	31	Luxembourg	1–0	2–0	UEFA Euro 2012 qualifying
11	17 November 2010	Wembley Stadium, London, England	32	England	1–0	2–1	Friendly
12	9 February 2011	Stade de France, Saint-Denis, France	33	Brazil	1–0	1–0	Friendly
13	2 September 2011	Stadiumi Qemal Stafa, Tirana, Albania	39	Albania	1–0	2–1	UEFA Euro 2012 qualifying
14	5 June 2012	MMArena, Le Mans, France	45	Estonia	2–0	4–0	Friendly
15	5 June 2012	MMArena, Le Mans, France	45	Estonia	3–0	4–0	Friendly
16	11 October 2013	Parc des Princes, Paris, France	61	Australia	6–0	6–0	Friendly
17	15 October 2013	Stade de France, Saint-Denis, France	62	Finland	3–0	3–0	2014 FIFA World Cup qualification
18	19 November 2013	Stade de France, Saint-Denis, France	64	Ukraine	2–0	3–0	2014 FIFA World Cup qualification
19	5 March 2014	Stade de France, Saint-Denis, France	65	Netherlands	1–0	2–0	Friendly
20	8 June 2014	Stade Pierre-Mauroy, Villeneuve-d'Ascq, France	66	Jamaica	3–0	8–0	Friendly
21	8 June 2014	Stade Pierre-Mauroy, Villeneuve-d'Ascq, France	66	Jamaica	5–0	8–0	Friendly
22	15 June 2014	Estádio Beira-Rio, Porto Alegre, Brazil	67	Honduras	1–0	3–0	2014 FIFA World Cup
23	15 June 2014	Estádio Beira-Rio, Porto Alegre, Brazil	67	Honduras	3–0	3–0	2014 FIFA World Cup
24	20 June 2014	Itaipava Arena Fonte Nova, Salvador, Brazil	68	Switzerland	4–0	5–2	2014 FIFA World Cup
25	11 October 2014	Stade de France, Saint-Denis, France	74	Portugal	1–0	2–1	Friendly
26	8 October 2015	Allianz Riviera, Nice, France	81	Armenia	3–0	4–0	Friendly
27	8 October 2015	Allianz Riviera, Nice, France	81	Armenia	4–0	4–0	Friendly
28	23 June 2021	Puskás Aréna, Budapest, Hungary	86	Portugal	1–1	2–2	UEFA Euro 2020
29	23 June 2021	Puskás Aréna, Budapest, Hungary	86	Portugal	2–1	2–2	UEFA Euro 2020
30	28 June 2021	Arena Națională, Bucharest, Romania	87	Switzerland	1–1	3–3 (a.e.t.)	UEFA Euro 2020
31	28 June 2021	Arena Națională, Bucharest, Romania	87	Switzerland	2–1	3–3 (a.e.t.)	UEFA Euro 2020
32	7 October 2021	Juventus Stadium, Turin, Italy	91	Belgium	1–2	3–2	2021 UEFA Nations League Finals
33	10 October 2021	San Siro, Milan, Italy	92	Spain	1–1	2–1	2021 UEFA Nations League final
34	13 November 2021	Parc des Princes, Paris, France	93	Kazakhstan	4–0	8–0	2022 FIFA World Cup qualification
35	13 November 2021	Parc des Princes, Paris, France	93	Kazakhstan	5–0	8–0	2022 FIFA World Cup qualification
36	16 November 2021	Helsinki Olympic Stadium, Helsinki, Finland	94	Finland	1–0	2–0	2022 FIFA World Cup qualification
37	3 June 2022	Stade de France, Saint-Denis, France	95	Denmark	1–0	1–2	2022–23 UEFA Nations League A

== Honours ==
Lyon

- Ligue 1: 2004–05, 2005–06, 2006–07, 2007–08
- Coupe de France: 2007–08
- Trophée des Champions: 2006, 2007

Real Madrid

- La Liga: 2011–12, 2016–17, 2019–20, 2021–22
- Copa del Rey: 2010–11, 2013–14, 2022–23
- Supercopa de España: 2012, 2017, 2020, 2022
- UEFA Champions League: 2013–14, 2015–16, 2016–17, 2017–18, 2021–22
- UEFA Super Cup: 2014, 2016, 2017, 2022
- FIFA Club World Cup: 2014, 2016, 2017, 2018, 2022

Al-Ittihad

- Saudi Pro League: 2024–25
- King's Cup: 2024–25

Al-Hilal

- King's Cup: 2025–26

France U17

- UEFA European Under-17 Championship: 2004

France

- UEFA Nations League: 2020–21
- FIFA World Cup runner-up: 2022

Individual

- Ballon d'Or: 2022
- Marca Leyenda Award: 2023
- UEFA Men's Player of the Year: 2021–22
- Golden Player Man Award: 2022
- Onze d'Or: 2020–21, 2021–22
- French Player of the Year: 2011, 2012, 2014, 2021
- UEFA Champions League Player of the Season: 2021–22
- UEFA Champions League top goalscorer: 2021–22
- FIFA FIFPRO World 11: 2022
- 2023 FIFA Club World Cup: Joint top scorer
- La Liga Player of the Season: 2019–20, 2021–22
- La Liga Best Player (voted by Marca fans): 2019–20, 2020–21, 2021–22
- Trofeo Alfredo Di Stéfano: 2019–20, 2021–22
- Pichichi Trophy: 2021–22
- UEFA Champions League top assist provider: 2011–12
- UEFA Champions League Squad of the Season: 2020–21
- UEFA Champions League Team of the Season: 2021–22
- IFFHS Men's World Team: 2022
- Globe Soccer Best Player of the Year: 2022
- La Liga Team of the Season: 2018–19, 2019–20, 2020–21, 2021–22, 2022–23
- UEFA La Liga Team of the Season: 2019–20
- Bravo Award: 2008
- Ligue 1 top scorer: 2007–08
- Coupe de France top scorer: 2007–08
- UNFP Ligue 1 Player of the Month: January 2008, April 2008
- UNFP Ligue 1 Player of the Year: 2007–08
- UNFP Ligue 1 Team of the Year: 2007–08
- UNFP Best French Player Playing Abroad: 2019, 2021, 2022, 2023
- Golden Lion for the best Lyon sportsman: 2007, 2008
- French Rookie of the Year: 2006
- Étoile d'Or: 2007–08
- La Liga Player of the Month: October 2014, June 2020, March 2021, September 2021, April 2022
- Supercopa de España top scorer: 2021–22, 2022–23
- Real Madrid Player of the Season (voted by supporters): 2015–16, 2018–19, 2019–20, 2021–22
- AS Player of the Year: 2021
- Kicker Player of the Season: 2022
- Madrid Sports Press Association Award (APDM)
- ESM Team of the Year: 2020–21, 2021–22
- L'Équipe's Team of the Year: 2020, 2021, 2022
- Saudi Pro League Player of the Season: 2024–25
- Saudi Pro League Team of the Season: 2024–25
- 2005 UEFA–CAF Meridian Cup top scorer
- UEFA European Championship Bronze Boot: 2020
- UEFA Nations League Finals Bronze Boot: 2021
- UEFA Nations League Finals Goal of the Tournament: 2021

== See also ==
- List of footballers with 100 or more UEFA Champions League appearances
- List of men's footballers with 1,000 or more official appearances
