= Squash at the 2003 All-Africa Games =

Game in African continent

Skwoš was among the sports at the 8th All Africa Games held in October 2003 in Abuja, Nigeria. Play featured both a men's and women's singles and team tournaments.

== Participating nations ==
- Egypt (7)
- Nigeria (2)
- South Africa (5)
- Zambia (1)
- Zimbabwe (1)

== Results ==
=== Medalist ===
Event	Gold	Silver	Bronze
Men's singles:	Karim Darwish; Egypt	Mohammed Abbas; Egypt	Rodney Durbach South Africa; Adrian Hansen South Africa
Women's singles:	Omneya Abdel Kawy; Egypt	Engy Kheirallah; Egypt	Eman el Amir Egypt; Amnah el Trabolsy Egypt
Men's team:	Egypt	South Africa	Nigeria & Zambia
Women's team:	Egypt	South Africa	Nigeria
