= Farida Arouche =

Algerian chess player (born 1980)

Personal information
- Born: 30 September 1980 (age 45)

Chess career
- Country: Algeria
- Title: Woman International Master (2002)
- FIDE rating: 2093 (July 2005)
- Peak rating: 2133 (January 2004)

Farida Arouche (born 30 September 1980), is an Algerian Woman International Master (WIM, 2002) and African Women's Chess Championship winner (2003).

== Biography ==
Farida Arouche participated in World Youth Chess Championships in various age groups. In 2001, in Cairo she won silver medal in African Women's Chess Championship. In 2003, in Abuja she won African Women's Chess Championship. In 2003, Farida Arouche played for Algeria in All-Africa Games chess tournament and won team gold medal.

In 2000s Farida Arouche participated in Women's World Chess Championship by knock-out system:

- In Women's World Chess Championship 2001 in the first round lost to Xu Yuhua,
- In Women's World Chess Championship 2004 in the first round lost to Maia Chiburdanidze.

Farida Arouche played for Algeria in the Women's Chess Olympiads:

- In 1994, at first board in the 31st Chess Olympiad (women) in Moscow (+4, =5, -3),
- In 2002, at third board in the 35th Chess Olympiad (women) in Bled (+3, =8, -2).
