= Mohamed Henni =

French-Algerian YouTuber (born 1989)

- Born: 15 May 1989 (age 36); Miramas, France
- Children: 2

YouTube information
- Channel: Mohamed Henni
- Years active: 2016–present
- Subscribers: 2.19 million
- Views: 443.8 million
- Last updated: 25 November 2025

Mohamed Henni (French pronunciation: [mɔamɛd eni], Arabic: محمد هني; born 15 May 1989) is a French-Algerian YouTuber and internet personality. He is known for his videos in which he reacts to football matches, most notably those of Olympique de Marseille, and his excesses of anger following the defeats of his favorite club that often result in him destroying television sets.

== Early life and education ==
Mohamed Henni was born in May 1989. Both of his parents are immigrated Algerians originating from the region of Oran. Mohamed is the youngest of six children. He was raised in Marseille, which explains his passion for Olympique de Marseille and the city, and Miramas, before obtaining a baccalauréat. After joining a college of economics, he dropped out of school and did various jobs to earn a living.

== Career ==
Henni began posting videos on Facebook in October 2012, burning a jersey of Paris Saint-Germain — the rivals of Olympique de Marseille – in a forest after a 2–2 draw between the clubs. He created his YouTube channel in January 2016. Henni is a supporter of Olympique de Marseille, and has notably worked alongside the ultras group of the Winners. He has become famous thanks to his videos in which he comments on football matches, and he is renowned for his humoristic criticisms of players, his puns, and for breaking numerous televisions on camera.

Following the 2016 Nice truck attack, Henni posted a video in which he challenged the Islamic State after there were threats of a new attack in Marseille. Following this, he reported having found a bullet from a firearm shot into his car and receiving direct threats from members of Daesh. David Thomson, a journalist who specializes in jihadism, confirmed the threats made on Henni.

In 2018, Henni's notoriety started to grow rapidly, which would allow him to do partnerships with sports betting sites and other brands, to make derivative products. His expressions have notably been imitated by footballers such as Antoine Griezmann, Florian Thauvin, Boubacar Kamara, and Franck Ribéry. In December 2018, his YouTube channel surpassed the one-million subscriber mark. In the beginning of 2019, he confessed to RMC Sport and Libération to working alone and not using any notes for his videos, instead improvising a large part of his text right after a match and doing no film editing. His social media activity allows him to live off it, notably thanks to monetization and to sponsors, allowing him to rent rooms at the Hôtel-Dieu de Marseille to film his videos. However, he insists on buying the televisions he breaks himself. In February 2019, Le Parisien wrote that Henni is "almost as famous as the players of Marseille". His video style has brought him international attention, with notably a BBC report on him.

In 2020, Henni did several livestreams with footballer Karim Benzema during the lockdown due to the COVID-19 pandemic in France, with one of the streams becoming controversial due to Benzema's remarks on Olivier Giroud, another French footballer. In June 2020, he collaborated with the hip-hop group Pancakes Bros for a video in Dunkirk. In March 2021, following the defeat of Marseille against amateur club Canet Roussillon in the Coupe de France, Henni promised to go run naked in the city center of Canet-en-Roussillon, which would bring him significant media attention. He would make a similar bet regarding arch-rivals PSG's UEFA Champions League quarter-final match-up with Bayern Munich in April. Henni stated that if PSG would eliminate Bayern, he would go up the Eiffel Tower naked. In May 2021, he featured in the intro of the music video for "Sapapaya", a song by rappers L'Algérino, SCH, and Jul.

In February 2024, Henni entered the restaurant business by creating a virtual restaurant of kebab sandwiches called "Klüb Kebab", in partnership with company No Brainer. The kebab service was initially offered in the cities of Marseille and Paris. On 12 March 2024, Henni announced that PSG player Kylian Mbappé's lawyer had sent him a formal notice threatening legal action for the use of Mbappé's name for commercial purposes without authorization in the description of one of his kebabs. The description stated that the round bread used in the kebab was "as round as Mbappé's skull".

== Criticism ==
Henni's videos are sometimes criticized for his harsh remarks and the pressure he weighs on players. Some, such as Patrice Evra and Valère Germain, have explicitly complained. He also received strong reactions from Nicolas Anelka following comments on his career. However, Henni changed his speech by making it progressively less violent than before, mostly due to the negative criticism he received.

== Personal life ==
On 1 October 2020, Henni announced that he had become a father.
