= Fouad El Taher =

Egyptian chess player (born 1965)

Personal information
- Born: 17 April 1965 (age 61)

Chess career
- Country: Egypt
- Title: International Master (1990)
- FIDE rating: 2483 (July 2026)
- Peak rating: 2505 (July 2003)

Fouad El Taher (born 17 April 1965) is an Egyptian chess player who holds the titles of International Master and FIDE Arbiter (2008). He won the Arab Chess Championship in 1992.

== Chess career ==
From the mid-1980s to the mid-2000s, Fouad El Taher was one of Egypt's leading chess players. In 1990 in Manila he participated in the World Chess Championship Interzonal Tournament where shared 58th - 59th place. In 1992, in Doha he won Arab Chess Championship.

Fouad El Taher has participated two times in a knockout FIDE World Chess Championships:

- In 2000 in New Delhi where he lost in 1st round to Aleksej Aleksandrov;
- In 2002 in Moscow where he lost in 1st round to Kiril Georgiev.

Fouad El Taher played for Egypt in the Chess Olympiads:

- In 1986, at first reserve board in the 27th Chess Olympiad in Dubai (+1, =1, -3),
- In 1988, at second reserve board in the 28th Chess Olympiad in Thessaloniki (+5, =3, -2),
- In 1990, at third board in the 29th Chess Olympiad in Novi Sad (+6, =5, -1),
- In 1992, at first board in the 30th Chess Olympiad in Manila (+3, =5, -3),
- In 1994, at first board in the 31st Chess Olympiad in Moscow (+4, =5, -1),
- In 1996, at third board in the 32nd Chess Olympiad in Yerevan (+6, =0, -3),
- In 2000, at first board in the 34th Chess Olympiad in Istanbul (+4, =4, -4),
- In 2006, at second board in the 37th Chess Olympiad in Turin (+3, =7, -0).

Fouad El Taher played for Egypt in the African Team Chess Championship:

- In 1993, at first board in the 1st African Team Chess Championship in Cairo (+4, =2, -1) and won team silver medal and individual gold medal.

Fouad El Taher played for Egypt in the African Games (chess - men):

- In 2003, at first board in the 8th All-Africa Games (chess - men) in Abuja (+5, =1, -0) and won team and individual gold medals,
- In 2007, at fourth board in the 9th All-Africa Games (chess - men) in Algiers (+5, =2, -2) and won team gold medal.
