= Juliana Negedu =

Nigerian basketball player

Personal information
- Born: 31 July 1979 (age 47) Kaduna, Nigeria
Medals
Women's basketball
Representing Nigeria
African Games (All-Africa Games)
Gold medal – first place	2003 Abuja	Team

Juliana Ojoshogu Negedu (born 31 July 1979 in Kaduna) is a Nigerian women's basketball player. A member of the Nigeria women's national basketball team at the 2004 Summer Olympics, Negedu scored 8 points in 5 games.
