= Pedro Aderito =

Angolan chess player (1976–2020)

Personal information
- Born: April 8, 1976
- Died: October 5, 2020 (aged 44)

Chess career
- Country: Angola
- Title: International Master (1995)
- Peak rating: 2352 (October 2007)

Pedro Aderito was an Angolan chess player.

== Chess career ==
Aderito began playing chess at the age of 15. He won the African Junior Championship in 1993 and earned his IM title in 1995, becoming the first Angolan player to do so.

Aderito represented Angola at multiple Chess Olympiads, from the 32nd (1996) until the 38th (2008). In the 33rd Chess Olympiad, he won a bronze medal for his performance on board 4.

Aderito's strong performance in the 2007 African Chess Championship qualified him to compete in that year's Chess World Cup. At the event, he was defeated by Vasyl Ivanchuk in the first round.

== Death ==
On October 5, 2020, Aderito died of an undisclosed illness at the age of 44.
