= Nigeria at the 2003 All-Africa Games =

- IOC code: NGR
- NOC: Nigerian Olympic Committee

in Abuja 5 October 2003 – 17 October 2003
- Competitors: 303 (164 men and 139 women)
- Medals Ranked 1st: Gold 85 Silver 90 Bronze 65 Total 240

All-Africa Games appearances (overview)
- 1965; 1973; 1978; 1987; 1991; 1995; 1999; 2003; 2007; 2011; 2015; 2019; 2023

Youth appearances
- 2010; 2014

Nigeria competed in the 2003 All-Africa Games held at the National Stadium in the city of Abuja. It was the eighth time that the country had taken part in the games and expectations were high for the competitors as they were playing on home soil. 2003 was the second time that Nigeria hosted the games, as the 1973 All-Africa Games had been held in Lagos thirty years before. The country did extremely well and achieved a commanding first place in the medal table. The team left with a total of 240 medals, of which 85 were gold medals and 90 silver, a tally that remained unmatched until 2019.

== Competitors ==
Nigeria fielded a team of 303 athletes at the games, far more than any other nation. Of these, 164 were men and 139 women. Amongst the games records that were broken were a time of 9.95 for Deji Aliu in the 100 metres and a put of 18.12 metres (19.82 yards) by Vivian Chukwuemeka. Mary Onyali-Omagbemi, whose medal tally before the games included gold at the 1994 Commonwealth Games and multiple honours at previous Africa Games, added to her total in the 100 and 200 metres, as well as participating in the 4×100 m relay team that broke the game record with a time of 43.04. Within the team games, there were also individual achievements. Godwin Unegbe achieved the highest number of points in the basketball tournament. In baseball, Jimmy Kolawale led the field in runs and was named best hitter of the games. In chess, Odion Aikhoje and Bunmi Olape both performed well, achieving medals at the second and third boards respectively.

== Medal summary ==
Nigeria won 240 medals in total, substantially more than in previous years and more than the total in the previous two competitions combined. This was the highest number of medals won in the competition until 2019, when the record was beaten by Egypt.

=== Medal table ===
Sport	Gold	Silver	Bronze	Total
Athletics	13	14	6	33
Badminton	3	4	3	10
Baseball	0	1	0	1
Basketball	1	0	1	2
Boxing	4	3	0	1
Chess	0	0	1	1
Cycling	1	0	0	1
Field hockey	0	1	0	1
Football	1	1	0	2
Gymnastics	0	0	0	0
Handball	0	0	1	1
Judo	0	0	4	4
Karate	0	2	2	4
Softball	0	1	0	1
Squash	0	0	0	0
Swimming	0	1	1	2
Table tennis	6	4	4	14
Taekwondo	0	2	3	5
Volleyball	0	0	1	1
Weightlifting	7	9	3	19
Wrestling	9	2	3	14
Total	85	90	65	240

== List of Medalists ==
=== Gold Medal ===
Medal	Name	Sport	Event	Date	Ref
Gold	Deji Aliu	Athletics	Men's 100m		
Gold	Mary Onyali-Omagbemi	Athletics	Women's 100m		
Gold	Uchenna Emedolu	Athletics	Men's 200m		
Gold	Mary Onyali-Omagbemi	Athletics	Women's 200m		
Gold	Grace Ebor	Athletics	Women's 800m		
Gold	Angela Atede	Athletics	Women's 100m hurdles		
Gold	Osita Okeagu	Athletics	Men's 400m hurdles		
Gold	Omolade Akinremi	Athletics	Women's 400m hurdles		
Gold	Nkeka Ukuh	Athletics	Women's high jump		
Gold	Esther Aghatise	Athletics	Women's long jump		
Gold	Vivian Chukwuemeka	Athletics	Women's shot put		
Gold	Chinedu Odozor; Emem Edem; Endurance Ojokolo; Mary Onyali-Omagbemi	Athletics	Women's 4 × 100 metres relay		
Gold	Bisi Afolabi; Doris Jacob; Glory Nwosu; Rosemary Onochie	Athletics	Women's 4 × 400 metres relay		
Gold	Ocholi Edicha	Badminton	Men’s singles		
Gold	Grace Daniel	Badminton	Women’s singles		
Gold	Ibrahim Adamu; Orobosa Okuonghae	Badminton	Men’s doubles		
Gold	Aisha Mohammed; Alaba Rafiu; Bola Solaja; Ezinne James; Funmilayo Ojelabi; Juliana Negedu; Mactabene Amachree; Mary Chinweokwu; Mfon Udoka; Nguveren Ivorhe; Patricia Chukwuma; Shola Ogunade	Basketball	Women’s basketball		
Gold	Ahmed Sadiq	Boxing	60 kg		
Gold	Davidson Emenogu	Boxing	64 kg		
Gold	Emmanuel Izonritei	Boxing	91 kg		
Gold	Gbenga Oloukun	Boxing	+91 kg		
Gold	Ego Uzoho	Cycling	Women’s time trial		
Gold	Nigeria women's national football team	Football	Women’s		
Gold	Tajudeen Agunbiade	Table tennis	Men's open standing		
Gold	Chinedu Njoku	Table tennis	Men's open sitting		
Gold	Maimuna Habib	Table tennis	Women's open standing		
Gold	Funke Oshonaike; Monday Merotohun	Table tennis	Mixed doubles		
Gold	Bode Abiodun; Kazeem Nosiru; Monday Merotohun; Moses Toriola; Peter Akinlabi	Table tennis	Men’s team		
Gold	Bosede Kaffo; Cecilia Ottu; Edem Offiong; Funke Oshonaike	Table tennis	Women’s team		
Gold	Patience Lawal	Weightlifting	Women’s 53 kg		
Gold	Gbenga Oluponna	Weightlifting	Men’s 56 kg		
Gold	Akwa Etineabasi	Weightlifting	Men’s 62 kg		
Gold	Ruel Ishaku	Weightlifting	Men’s Powerlifting 48 kg		
Gold	Sadiq Animashaw	Weightlifting	Men’s Powerlifting 56 kg		
Gold	Lucy Ejike	Weightlifting	Women’s Powerlifting 56 kg		
Gold	Solomon Amarakuo	Weightlifting	Men’s Powerlifting 100 kg		
Gold	Isaac Jacob	Wrestling	Men’s 55 kg		
Gold	Happiness Burutu	Wrestling	Women’s 63 kg		

=== Silver Medal ===
Medal	Name	Sport	Event	Date	Ref

=== Bronze Medal ===
Medal	Name	Sport	Event	Date	Ref

== See also ==
- Amos Adamu
