= Asma Houli =

Algerian chess player (born 1976)

Personal information
- Born: 30 December 1976 (age 49)

Chess career
- Country: Algeria
- FIDE rating: 2083 (January 2006)
- Peak rating: 2116 (April 2004)

Asma Houli (born 30 December 1976), is an Algerian chess player and African Women's Chess Championship winner (2001). Since 2024 she is a Woman FIDE Master (WFM).

== Biography ==
In 2001, in Cairo she won the African Women's Chess Championship. In 2003, in Abuja she ranked 3rd in the African Women's Chess Championship. In 2003, she played for Algeria in the All-Africa Games chess tournament and won team and individual gold medals.

In 2000s Asma Houli participated in Women's World Chess Championship by knock-out system:

- In Women's World Chess Championship 2000 in the first round she lost to Rakhil Eidelson,
- In Women's World Chess Championship 2001 in the first round she lost to Maia Chiburdanidze,
- In Women's World Chess Championship 2004 in the first round she lost to Svetlana Matveeva.

Asma Houli played for Algeria in the Women's Chess Olympiads:

- In 1992, at third board in the 30th Chess Olympiad (women) in Manila (+5, =2, -7),
- In 2002, at second board in the 35th Chess Olympiad (women) in Bled (+4, =5, -4).
