= FIDE Women's Grand Prix 2011–12 =

Women's chess tournament series

The FIDE Women's Grand Prix 2011–12 was a series of six chess tournaments exclusively for women, which formed part of the qualification cycle for the Women's World Chess Championship 2013. The winner of the Grand Prix, Hou Yifan, will challenge the 2012 Women's World Chess champion.

== Format ==
18 top world women players were to be selected to compete in these tournaments. Each player agrees and will contract to participate in exactly four of these tournaments. Players must rank their preference of tournaments once the final list of host cities is announced and the dates are allocated to each host city.

Each tournament is a 12-player, single round-robin tournament. In each round, players scored 1 point for a win, ½ point for a draw and 0 for a loss. Grand prix points were then allocated according to each player's standing in the tournament: 160 grand prix points for first place, 130 for second place, 110 for third place, and then 90 down to 10 points by steps of 10. In case of a tie in points the tied players share grand pix points evenly. Players only counted their best three tournament results. The player with the most grand prix points is the winner.

== Players and qualification ==
There were several ways to qualify for the Grand Prix series.

- The top four from the Women's World Chess Championship 2010:
  - Hou Yifan, Ruan Lufei, Koneru Humpy, and Zhao Xue.
- The winner of the previous Grand Prix
  - (As Hou Yifan was already qualified an additional sixth rating entry was given)
- The six highest rated players (average of July 2010 and January 2011 lists) not already qualified:
  - Judit Polgár (declined), Tatiana Kosintseva, Antoaneta Stefanova, Nadezhda Kosintseva, Anna Muzychuk, and Kateryna Lahno.
- Two players nominated by the FIDE president:
  - Zhu Chen and Batkhuyag Munguntuul.
- One nominee from each of the six host cities:
  - Ekaterina Kovalevskaya (Rostov), Ju Wenjun (Shenzhen), Alexandra Kosteniuk (Nalchik), Alisa Galliamova (Kazan), Elina Danielian (Jermuk), and Betul Cemre Yildiz (Istanbul).

Polgár, the highest rated woman in the world, has never competed for the women's title and declined to participate in this cycle as well, so her spot was given to the next player on the average rating list, Viktorija Cmilyte.

At the second tournament in Shenzhen, Tan Zhongyi replaced Alisa Galliamova.

== Prize money and Grand Prix points ==
The prize fund was €40,000 per Grand Prix event and €60,000 for the overall Grand Prix placement.

Place	Single Grand Prix event	Overall standings	Grand Prix points
1	€6,500	€15,000	160
2	€4,750	€10,000	130
3	€4,000	€8,000	110
4	€3,750	€7,000	90
5	€3,500	€6,000	80
6	€3,250	€5,000	70
7	€3,000	€4,000	60
8	€2,750	€3,000	50
9	€2,500	€2,000	40
10	€2,250	–	30
11	€2,000	–	20
12	€1,750	–	10

== Tie breaks ==
With the objective of determining a clear, single winner to play in the Challenger Match and in the case that two or more players have equal cumulative points at the top, the following criteria (in descending order) will be utilized to decide the overall winner:

1. The fourth result not already in the top three performances
2. The number of actual game points scored in the four tournaments
3. The number of first-place finishes
4. The number of second-place finishes
5. The number of won games
6. Drawing of lots

== Results ==
The six tournaments were:

Nr	Host city	Date	Winner	Points (Win/Draw/Loss)
1	Rostov, Russia	1–15 August 2011	Hou Yifan	8/11 (+6 =4 –1)
2	Shenzhen, China	6–20 September 2011	Hou Yifan	8/11 (+5 =6 –0)
3	Nalchik, Russia	8–23 October 2011	Zhao Xue	9.5/11 (+9 =1 –1)
4	Kazan, Russia	10–21 June 2012	Koneru Humpy and Anna Muzychuk	7.5/11 (+4 =7 –0)
5	Jermuk, Armenia	16–30 July 2012	Hou Yifan	7/11 (+4 =6 –1)
6	Ankara, Turkey	16–28 September 2012	Koneru Humpy	8.5/11 (+7 =3 –1)

=== Events crosstables ===
Rostov, August 2011
		Rating	1	2	3	4	5	6	7	8	9	10	11	12	Score	Tie break
1	(China) Hou Yifan	2575	–	0	1	½	½	1	1	½	1	½	1	1	8	
2	(Ukraine) Kateryna Lahno	2536	1	–	0	½	1	½	1	1	1	0	½	½	7	
3	(Slovenia) Anna Muzychuk	2538	0	1	–	½	½	½	1	½	½	1	½	½	6½	34.25
4	(Russia) Tatiana Kosintseva	2557	½	½	½	–	½	½	0	1	½	1	1	½	6½	33.50
5	(Russia) Nadezhda Kosintseva	2560	½	0	½	½	–	½	½	½	½	½	1	1	6	
6	(India) Koneru Humpy	2614	0	½	½	½	½	–	½	½	½	1	0	1	5½	28.25
7	(Russia) Alisa Galliamova	2492	0	0	0	1	½	½	–	1	0	1	1	½	5½	26.75
8	(Bulgaria) Antoaneta Stefanova	2524	½	0	½	0	½	½	0	–	1	½	1	½	5	25.25
9	(Armenia) Elina Danielian	2521	0	0	½	½	½	½	1	0	–	0	1	1	5	24.25
10	(China) Ruan Lufei	2479	½	1	0	0	½	0	0	½	1	–	½	½	4½	
11	(Russia) Ekaterina Kovalevskaya	2427	0	½	½	0	0	1	0	0	0	½	–	1	3½	
12	(Russia) Alexandra Kosteniuk	2497	0	½	½	½	0	0	½	½	0	½	0	–	3	

Shenzhen, September 2011
		Rating	1	2	3	4	5	6	7	8	9	10	11	12	Score	Tie break
1	(China) Hou Yifan	2578	–	½	½	1	½	1	1	½	½	1	1	½	8	
2	(Slovenia) Anna Muzychuk	2545	½	–	½	½	½	½	½	1	½	1	½	1	7	
3	(China) Ju Wenjun	2536	½	½	–	½	1	½	½	0	1	½	½	1	6½	33.75
4	(China) Tan Zhongyi	2429	0	½	½	–	½	½	½	½	½	1	1	1	6½	31.25
5	(China) Zhao Xue	2497	½	½	0	½	–	1	1	0	½	½	½	1	6	31.25
6	(China) Ruan Lufei	2477	0	½	½	½	0	–	½	1	½	½	1	1	6	28.75
7	(Mongolia) Batkhuyagiin Möngöntuul	2465	0	½	½	½	0	½	–	0	1	1	½	1	5½	
8	(Armenia) Elina Danielian	2517	½	0	1	½	1	0	1	–	0	0	½	½	5	
9	(Qatar) Zhu Chen	2490	½	½	0	½	½	½	0	1	–	0	½	½	4½	25.00
10	(Lithuania) Viktorija Cmilyte	2525	0	0	½	0	½	½	0	1	1	–	½	½	4½	22.00
11	(Russia) Ekaterina Kovalevskaya	2421	0	½	½	0	½	0	½	½	½	½	–	½	4	
12	(Turkey) Betul Cemre Yildiz	2308	½	0	0	0	0	0	0	½	½	½	½	–	2½	

Nalchik, October 2011
		Rating	1	2	3	4	5	6	7	8	9	10	11	12	Score	Tie break
1	(China) Zhao Xue	2497	–	0	½	1	1	1	1	1	1	1	1	1	9½	
2	(China) Ju Wenjun	2536	1	–	½	½	½	1	½	1	1	½	0	½	7	
3	(Russia) Ekaterina Kovalevskaya	2421	½	½	–	1	½	½	½	1	½	½	½	0	6	33.75
4	(Lithuania) Viktorija Cmilyte	2525	0	½	0	–	1	½	1	½	½	½	½	1	6	29.25
5	(Ukraine) Kateryna Lahno	2554	0	½	½	0	–	½	½	½	1	½	½	1	5½	
6	(Qatar) Zhu Chen	2490	0	0	½	½	½	–	½	½	1	½	1	0	5	25.00
7	(Russia) Tatiana Kosintseva	2536	0	½	½	0	½	½	–	½	½	½	½	1	5	24.50
8	(Russia) Nadezhda Kosintseva	2560	0	0	0	½	½	½	½	–	½	½	1	1	5	23.00
9	(Bulgaria) Antoaneta Stefanova	2528	0	0	½	½	0	0	½	½	–	1	1	1	5	23.00
10	(Russia) Alisa Galliamova	2498	0	½	½	½	½	½	½	½	0	–	1	0	4½	
11	(Mongolia) Batkhuyagiin Möngöntuul	2465	0	1	½	½	½	0	½	0	0	0	–	1	4	
12	(Russia) Alexandra Kosteniuk	2469	0	½	1	0	0	1	0	0	0	1	0	–	3½	

Kazan, June 2012
		Rating	1	2	3	4	5	6	7	8	9	10	11	12	Score	Tie break
1	(India) Koneru Humpy	2589	–	½	½	½	½	½	½	1	1	½	1	1	7½	36.75
2	(Slovenia) Anna Muzychuk	2598	½	–	½	½	½	½	½	½	1	1	1	1	7½	36.50
3	(Lithuania) Viktorija Cmilyte	2508	½	½	–	1	0	½	½	½	½	1	1	1	7	35.00
4	(China) Hou Yifan	2623	½	½	0	–	1	1	1	½	1	½	1	0	7	37.25
5	(Russia) Alexandra Kosteniuk	2457	½	½	1	0	–	1	½	0	½	0	1	1	6	31.00
6	(Armenia) Elina Danielian	2484	½	½	½	0	0	–	1	1	½	1	0	1	6	30.75
7	(Russia) Tatiana Kosintseva	2532	½	½	½	0	½	0	–	1	½	½	½	1	5½	
8	(Ukraine) Kateryna Lahno	2546	0	½	½	½	1	0	0	–	½	½	1	½	5	
9	(Bulgaria) Antoaneta Stefanova	2518	0	0	½	0	½	½	½	½	–	1	½	½	4½	22
10	(Russia) Nadezhda Kosintseva	2528	½	0	0	½	1	0	½	½	0	–	1	½	4½	22.75
11	(Russia) Alisa Galliamova	2484	0	0	0	0	0	1	½	0	½	0	–	1	3	
12	(Turkey) Betul Cemre Yildiz	2333	0	0	0	1	0	0	0	½	½	½	0	–	2½	

Jermuk, July 2012
		Rating	1	2	3	4	5	6	7	8	9	10	11	12	Score	Tie break
1	(China) Hou Yifan	2617	–	½	0	½	½	1	½	½	1	1	½	1	7	
2	(Russia) Nadezhda Kosintseva	2516	½	–	½	1	½	1	1	1	0	0	½	½	6½	36.50
3	(Ukraine) Kateryna Lahno	2537	1	½	–	1	½	½	0	½	½	1	½	½	6½	36.00
4	(India) Koneru Humpy	2598	½	0	0	–	1	½	1	0	1	1	½	1	6½	33.00
5	(China) Ju Wenjun	2518	½	½	½	0	–	1	0	1	½	½	½	1	6	31.25
6	(China) Ruan Lufei	2483	0	0	½	½	0	–	1	½	1	½	1	1	6	29.25
7	(China) Zhao Xue	2556	½	0	1	0	1	0	–	½	1	0	½	1	5½	
8	(Armenia) Elina Danielian	2480	½	0	½	1	0	½	½	–	½	½	½	½	5	27.50
9	(Armenia) Lilit Mkrtchian	2450	0	1	½	0	½	0	0	½	–	1	½	1	5	25.25
10	(Russia) Ekaterina Kovalevskaya	2417	0	1	0	0	½	½	1	½	0	–	1	0	4½	
11	(Mongolia) Batkhuyagiin Möngöntuul	2447	½	½	½	½	½	0	½	½	½	0	–	0	4	
12	(Georgia (country)) Nino Khurtsidze	2456	0	½	½	0	0	0	0	½	0	1	1	–	3½	

Ankara, September 2012
		Rating	1	2	3	4	5	6	7	8	9	10	11	12	Score	Tie break
1	(India) Koneru Humpy	2593	–	0	½	½	1	½	1	1	1	1	1	1	8½	
2	(Slovenia) Anna Muzychuk	2606	1	–	½	½	½	½	1	½	½	1	1	1	8	
3	(China) Zhao Xue	2549	½	½	–	0	½	1	½	1	1	1	1	½	7½	
4	(Lithuania) Viktorija Cmilyte	2520	½	½	1	–	½	½	0	½	1	0	1	1	6½	33.50
5	(China) Ruan Lufei	2492	0	½	½	½	–	½	½	½	½	1	1	1	6½	29.50
6	(Mongolia) Batkhuyagiin Möngöntuul	2434	½	½	0	½	½	–	½	1	½	½	1	½	6	
7	(Russia) Tatiana Kosintseva	2524	0	0	½	1	½	½	–	1	½	0	1	½	5½	
8	(China) Ju Wenjun	2528	0	½	0	½	½	0	0	–	1	1	½	1	5	
9	(Bulgaria) Antoaneta Stefanova	2502	0	½	0	0	½	½	½	0	–	1	½	1	4½	
10	(Turkey) Betul Cemre Yildiz	2341	0	0	0	1	0	½	1	0	0	–	½	½	3½	
11	(Poland) Monika Soćko	2463	0	0	0	0	0	0	0	½	½	½	–	1	2½	
12	(Turkey) Kübra Öztürk	2294	0	0	½	0	0	½	½	0	0	½	0	–	2	

=== Grand Prix standings ===
Hou Yifan won the Grand Prix with a perfect score culminating with her third sole victory at the fifth Grand Prix in Jermuk and thus qualified her to face Anna Ushenina in the Women's World Chess Championship 2013. A score in italics denotes a score not being into account for the total as there are three better results for the player.

	Player	Rostov	Shenzhen	Nalchik	Kazan	Jermuk	Ankara	Played	Best 3
1	Hou Yifan (CHN)	160	160		100	160		4	480
2	Koneru Humpy (IND)	65			145	110	160	4	415
3	Anna Muzychuk (SLO)	100	130		145		130	4	405
4	Zhao Xue (CHN)		75	160		60	110	4	345
5	Kateryna Lahno (UKR)	130		80	50	110		4	320
6	Ju Wenjun (CHN)		100	130		75	50	4	305
7	Viktorija Cmilyte (LTU)		35	100	100		85	4	285
8	Nadezhda Kosintseva (RUS)	80		55	35	110		4	245
9	Ruan Lufei (CHN)	30	75			75	85	4	235
10	Tatiana Kosintseva (RUS)	100		55	60		60	4	220
11	Elina Danielian (ARM)	45	50		75	45		4	170
12	Ekaterina Kovalevskaya (RUS)	20	20	100		30		4	150
12	Batkhuyagiin Möngöntuul (MGL)		60	20		20	70	4	150
14	Antoaneta Stefanova (BUL)	45		55	35		40	4	140
15	Alisa Galliamova (RUS)	65		30	20			3	115
16	Tan Zhongyi (CHN)		100					1	100
17	Alexandra Kosteniuk (RUS)	10		10	75			3	95
18	Zhu Chen (QAT)		35	55				2	90
19	Betul Cemre Yildiz (TUR)		10		10		30	3	50
20	Lilit Mkrtchian (ARM)					45		1	45
21	Monika Soćko (POL)						20	1	20
22	Nino Khurtsidze (GEO)					10		1	10
22	Kübra Öztürk (TUR)						10	1	10

Notes: Tan Zhongyi replaced Alisa Galliamova in Shenzhen. Nino Khurtsidze and Lilit Mkrtchian replaced Alexandra Kosteniuk and Zhu Chen in Jermuk, who had withdrawn their participation.

== See also ==
- FIDE Women's Grand Prix 2009–11, the previous cycle
- FIDE Women's Grand Prix 2013–14, the next cycle
