= Nilüfer Çınar Çorlulu =

Turkish chess player (born 1962)

Nilüfer Çinar Çorlulu
Personal information
- Born: Nilüfer Çınar; November 4, 1962 (age 63) İskenderun, Turkey

Chess career
- Country: Turkey
- Title: Woman International Master (1993)
- Peak rating: 2120 (July 1994)

Nilüfer Çinar Çorlulu (born Nilüfer Çınar on November 4, 1962) is a Turkish Woman International Master (WIM) of chess. With nine national champion titles, she is one of the most successful female chess players in Turkey, being only second after Gülümser Öney, who has eleven titles, and equaled in 2013 by Betül Cemre Yıldız.

== Early years ==
Nilüfer was born in 1962 in İskenderun, southern Turkey. In high school, she was a successful basketball player, and her teacher recommended that she attend sports academy after graduation. She got acquainted with chess quite late through a friend during her first year at the Black Sea Technical University in Trabzon, where she studied mathematics. She soon realized that her friend did not even know the rules of chess well. The more she learned chess, the more her lifestyle changed.

== Chess career ==
In 1984, she participated in a tournament organized by the Student Affairs Directoriate held in İnciraltı, İzmir and took third place. The same year, Nilüfer took part at the Turkish Chess Championship and placed sixth. Getting more ambitious, she thought even about dropping out of university in order to devote herself to chess playing completely. In 1986, she won second place at the national championship. Nilüfer took part at the 27th Chess Olympiad in Dubai, United Arab Emirates in 1986, reaching in total 9½/14. In 1987 she became the Turkish champion, and repeated her success for six consecutive years until 1992. After her second place at the zonal tournament in Greece in 1993, she was awarded the title of Woman International Master by FIDE, as the first ever Turkish woman receiving this honor.

She has complained about the lack of an expert trainer in that time due to the Turkish Chess Federation's financial incapability to support her. She decided then to pause a while because there was no higher goal for her. Still in the national team, she returned to chess in 1999, and became again national champion, defending her title in two following years. She has admitted that in the 1980s and 1990s women's chess in Turkey was not at a high level.

Nilüfer was a member of the Turkish national team for 21 years. A graduate of mathematics, she serves as a trainer and consultant of chess, mathematics and geometry as well as mental arithmetic for children aged 5–14 in her own firm based in Ankara. Nilüfer Çınar Çorlulu plays also simultaneous chess with school children to get them interested in chess. She serves as the Turkish Chess Federation's province representative in Ankara.

== Achievements ==
Turkish Chess Championship

- 1986 – 2nd place
- 1987–1992 (six times), 1999–2001 (three times) – champion
