= Mustafa Yılmaz =

Turkish chess grandmaster (born 1992)

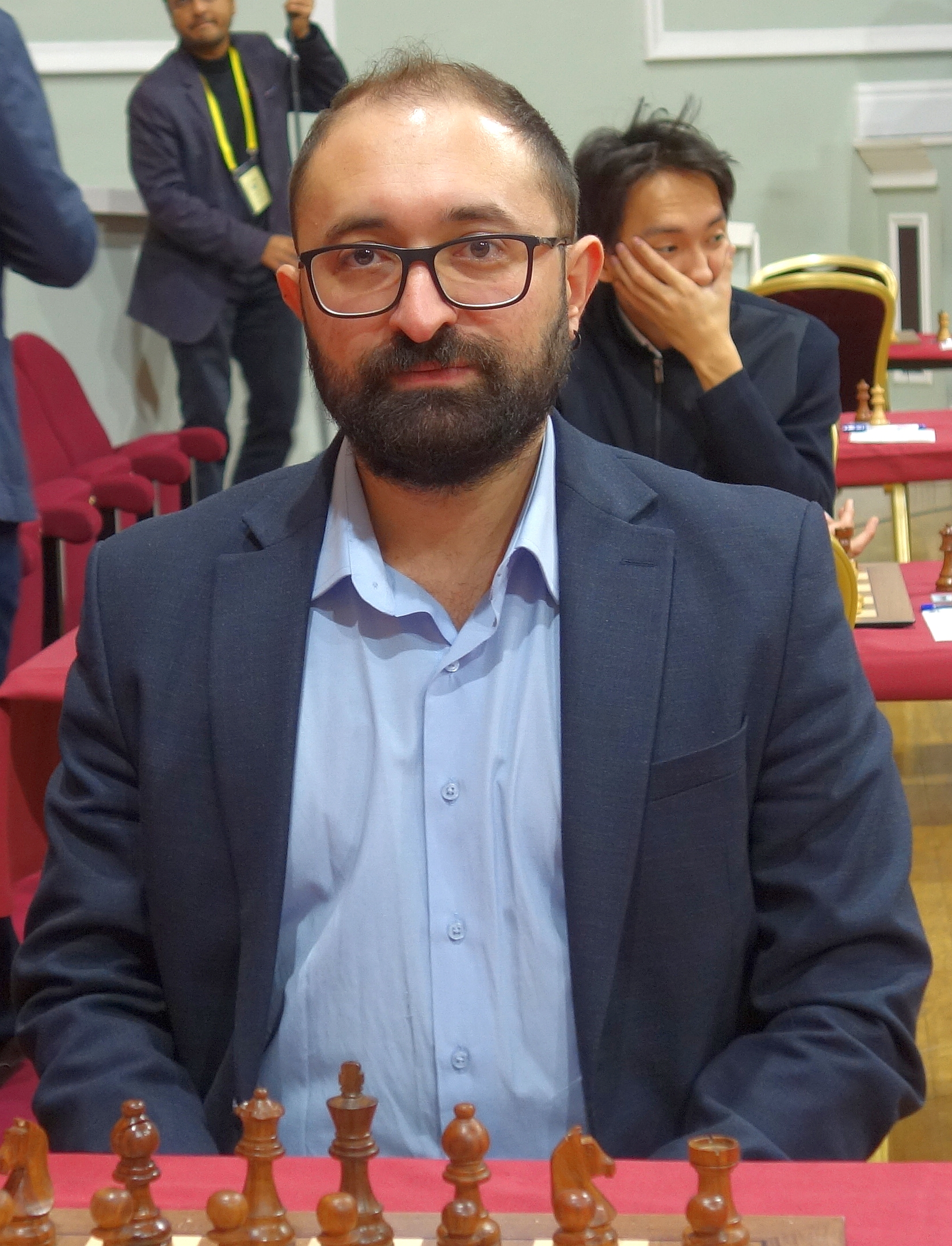
- Yılmaz in 2023

Personal information
- Born: 5 November 1992 (age 33) Mamak, Turkey

Chess career
- Country: Turkey
- Title: Grandmaster (2012)
- FIDE rating: 2556 (July 2026)
- Peak rating: 2665 (December 2023)
- Peak ranking: No. 66 (January 2024)

Mustafa Yılmaz (born 5 November 1992) is a Turkish chess player who received the FIDE title of Grandmaster (GM) in September 2012. He is a three-time Turkish Chess Champion.

== Chess career ==
He earned the titles of FIDE Master (FM) in 2008 and International Master (IM) in 2009. He is a native of Mamak in Ankara.

Yılmaz began playing chess at the age of seven, encouraged by his older sister Ezgi Yılmaz, also a Turkish chess champion. He attended the same chess course in Mamak, Ankara with Kübra Öztürk, who became a Woman Grandmaster (WGM).

In 2008, Yılmaz was admitted to the Turkish national chess team. The same year, he took part in the 38th Chess Olympiad held in Dresden, Germany. In 2009, he became the youngest Turkish chess champion, defeating Barış Esen in the final round and reaching a total score of 11½/13.

At the initiative of the Turkish Chess Federation, in 2012 he entered the Chess Department of Russian State Social University in Moscow along with Burak Fırat and Demre Kerigan; to receive instruction from chess masters and to learn Russian.

In January 2023, Yılmaz finished second in the Tata Steel Challengers with a score of 9/13.

He took part in the Chess World Cup 2023, where he reached the third round and lost in rapid tiebreaks to 3rd seed Fabiano Caruana after missing a huge chance in the second classical game . After the World Cup, Yilmaz had a surge in rating after strong showings at the European Club Cup and the FIDE Grand Swiss 2023. In the former, he scored 5,5/7 beating Vallejo Pons and only losing against Armenian GM Haik Martirosyan, while in the latter he scored 6,5/11, losing only in the first round against 2750-rated Richard Rapport and beating notable opponents such as Martirosyan and Harikrishna, mustering an overall TPR of 2753.

He, then, took part in the European Team Chess Championship playing on board 1 for Turkey, scoring 4,5/8 as Turkey finished in 22nd place.

He, again, took part in the Chess World Cup 2025, where, as the 97th seed, he beat 161st and 32nd seeds Aldiyar Ansat and Bu Xiangzhi 1.5-0.5 and 2.5-1.5 in the first and second rounds, before losing to 33rd seed Shant Sargsyan 0.5-1.5 in the third round.

== Achievements ==
Turkish Chess Championship

- 2009 – champion
- 2017 – champion
- 2022 – champion

World Junior Chess Championship

- 2012 – 19th place
