= Manisa Celal Bayar University =

Public university in Manisa, Turkey

Coordinates: 38.610633°N 27.381599°E

- Manisa Celal Bayar Üniversitesi
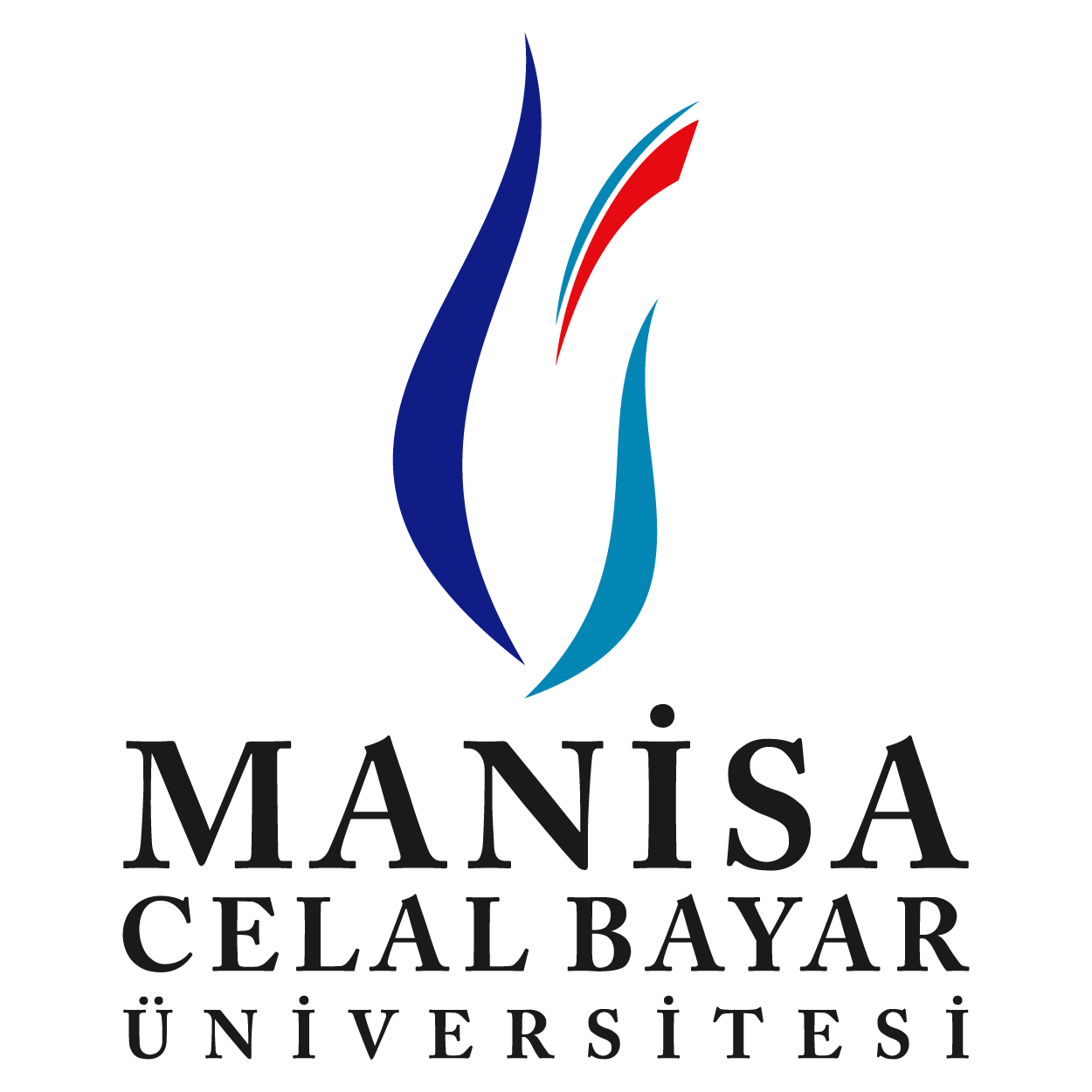
- Former names: Manisa Physical Education and Military Sports School (1959–1982); Dokuz Eylül University in Manisa (1982–1992)
- Motto: Bilim ve İnsan
- Motto in English: Science and Human
- Type: Public
- Established: 1959 / 1992
- Affiliations: ERASMUS; UNIMED
- Rector: Rana Kibar
- Students: 55,473 (including associate's) (fall 2017)
- Undergraduates: 29,566 (fall 2017)
- Postgraduates: 5,360 (fall 2017)
- Location: Manisa, Turkey
- Campus: Suburban
- Language: Turkish, English
Colors
- Website: www.mcbu.edu.tr

University rankings

Regional – Overall
- QS Emerging Europe and Central Asia: 351-400 (2022)

Manisa Celal Bayar University (Turkish: Manisa Celal Bayar Üniversitesi, also referred as CBU or MCBU) is a public research university located in Manisa, Turkey. CBU traces its roots back to 1959 as an independent sports and teachers' college in Manisa. The main campus is in the Muradiye district of Manisa. The university is composed of 14 colleges, 3 schools, and 15 vocational schools. As of 2017 university offers over 70 different undergraduate and over 90 graduate programs. Physical Education and Sports College is also one of the oldest institutions in Turkey that began offering sports science and physical education programs.

It is one of the largest universities in Aegean Region, with more than 55,000 student body and 1,156 faculty members. As of Fall 2017 there are 652 international students.

== History ==
=== Early years ===
The university's roots date back to 1959, when Turkish Armed Forces founded a school named Manisa Armed Forces Physical Education and Sports School. This school then converted to a four-year college in 1975, one of the oldest of its kind in Turkey. Today it is still serving as The School of Physical Education and Sports.

In 1964 Demirci Normal School began its education in Demirci, Manisa, to train high school graduates to be teachers in various parts of Anatolia. Demirci normal school was then converted to a four-year degree offering education college where it continues to serve as The College of Education.

A unique and the only one of its kind, School Of Tobacco Expertise was established in 1975 and then relocated to Akhisar, Manisa in 1987. Today, the school is still serving as School Of Tobacco Expertise.

One of the first higher education in the city of Manisa came to life with Manisa Vocational School of Accounting which was founded in 1975. Between 1975 and 1982 its administration was under Ege University. From 1982 to 1992, with sports and education colleges, it was moved under Dokuz Eylül University administration. Today it is known as The College of Economics and Administrative Sciences.

In 1982, College of Economics and Administrative Sciences, College of Education, and School of Physical Education and Sports became Dokuz Eylül University at Manisa

=== Name change: Celal Bayar University ===
In 1992, with the merger of already established colleges, Celal Bayar university began its education. Four new colleges; College of Art and Sciences, College of Engineering, College of Medicine, School of Health Sciences; three colleges that were under Dokuz Eylül University administration; College of Economics and Administrative Sciences, College of Education, and School of Physical Education and Sports and a college that was under the administration of Ege University; School of Tobacco Expertise, and finally other vocational schools that are in and around city limits of Manisa, Celal Bayar University was formed. The university has continued adding new colleges to respond the dynamic needs of communities and students.

University is proud to carry the name Celal Bayar, who is the third president of Turkey.

In order to emphasize its location, the university asked the higher education department to add Manisa in its name. Finally, since 2016 the university became Manisa Celal Bayar University.

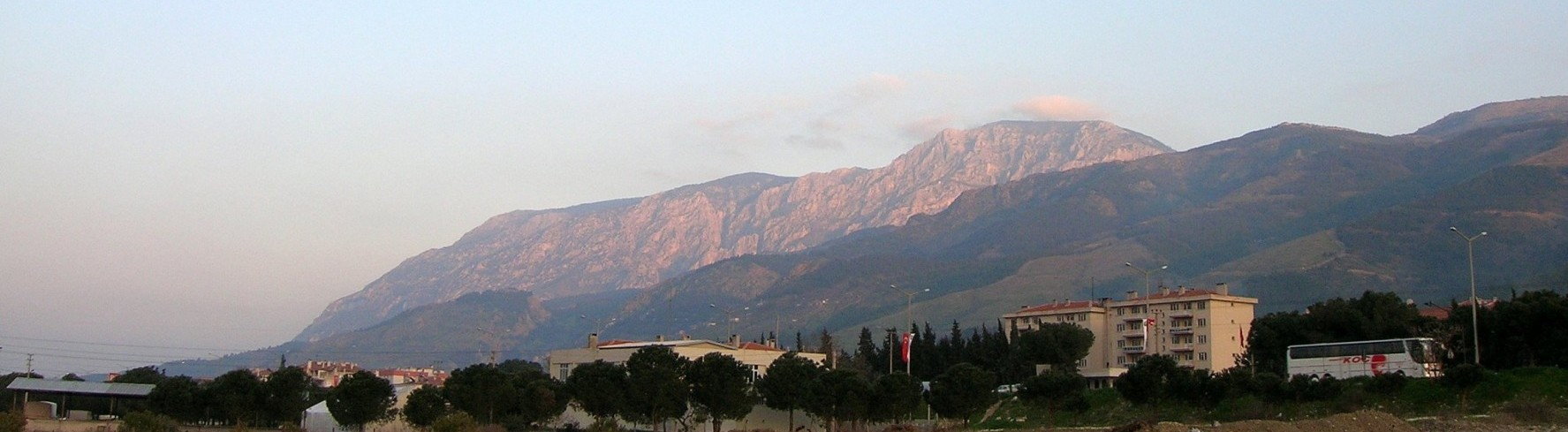
Mount Sipylus General View

=== Timeline of name changes ===
The school has had several names in the past:

- 1959 opened as Manisa Armed Forces Physical Education and Sports School.
- 1964 designated Demirci Normal School in Demirci, Manisa.
- 1975 designated Manisa Vocational School of Accounting
- 1975 designated School Of Tobacco Expertise in Akhisar, Manisa
- 1982 designated Dokuz Eylül University at Manisa
- 1992 became Celal Bayar University
- 2016 became Manisa Celal Bayar University

== Campuses ==
Celal Bayar University is composed of three main campuses; Muradiye, Uncubozkoy, and Downtown Manisa campuses. MCBU also has colleges and schools that are located in its different districts.

=== Layout ===
==== Muradiye Campus ====
Campus was renamed as "Şehit Prof.Dr. İlhan Varank" campus after professor Varank, who lost his life during 2016 Turkish coup d'état attempt. College of Art and Science, College of Engineering, College of Economic and Administrative Sciences, School of Business, and School of Applied Sciences are all located at this Campus. Varank campus has a couple of dormitories and a library as well.

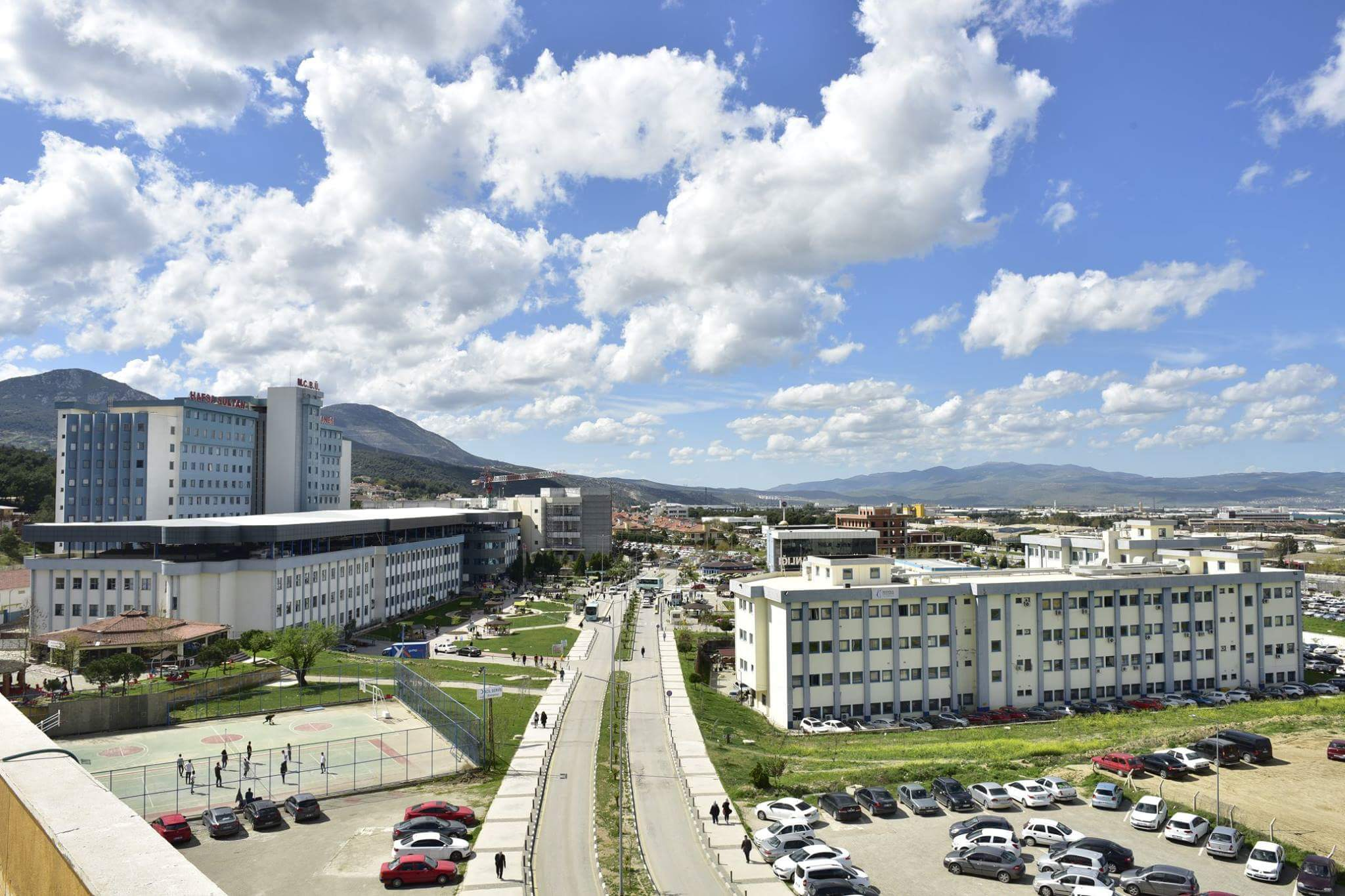
Celal Bayar University College of Medicine Hospital

==== Uncubozkoy Campus ====
Uncubozkoy Campus is located just outskirts of Mount Sipylus. The campus is home to College of Medicine, Hafsa Sultan Celal Bayar University Hospital, College of Health Sciences, and Suleyman Demirel Cultural Center.

==== Downtown Manisa campus ====
College of Sports Sciences, College of Theology, and School of Foreign Languages can be found at this location.

- Demirci Campus: College of Education is located in the historical district of Demirci which is 3 hours away from the city.
- Turgutlu Campus: is established in 2012 for Hasan Ferdi Turgutlu College of Technology.
- Salihli Campus: is a new campus of Salihli College of Economic and Administrative Sciences.
- Akhisar Campus: is home to School of Tobacco Expertise.

=== Landmarks ===
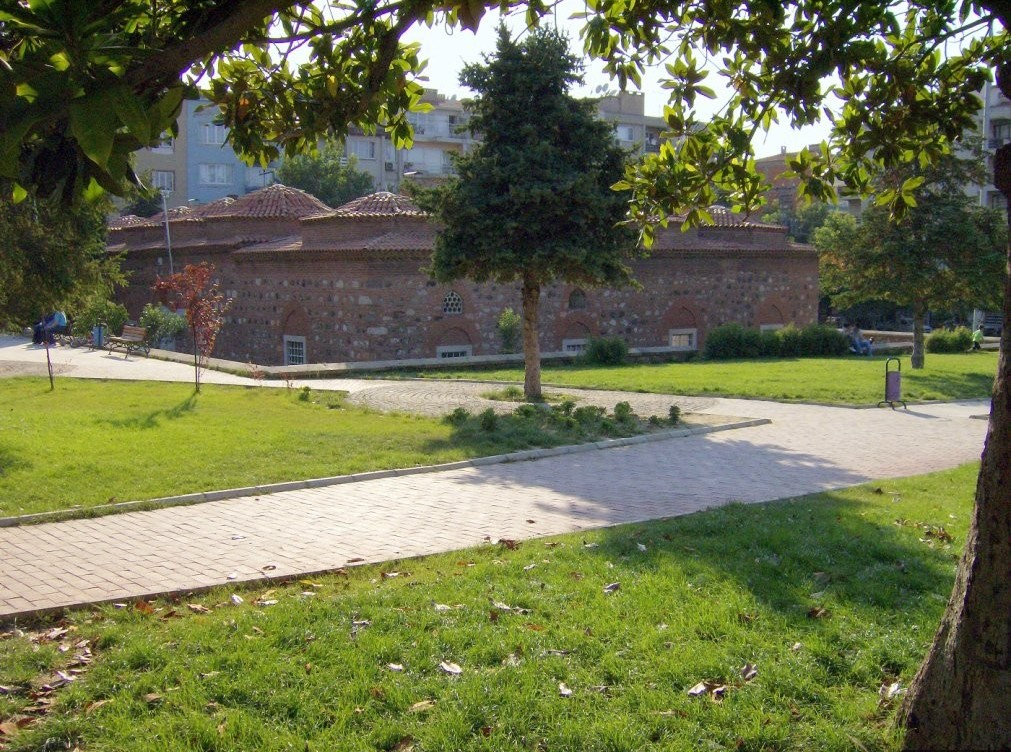
Museum of Medicine History

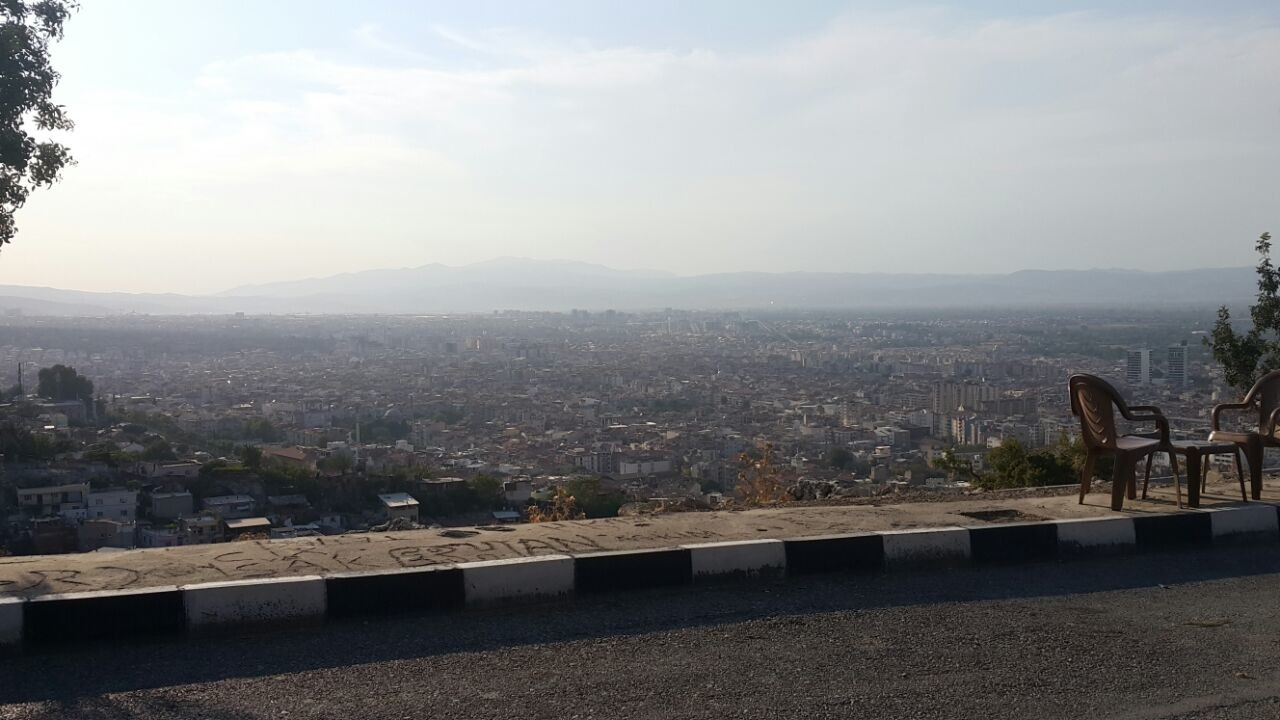
Manisa city view from Mevlevihane

==== The Museum of Medicine History ====
It was constructed for Hafsa Sultan, the mother of Suleiman the Magnificent, in 1539. It served as a hospital until the Turkish Republic was founded. It also served as an asylum after the 1850s.

It was restored from time to time during the Republican era. Later in 1994, it was left to Celal Bayar University and reopened as a Health Museum in 2013.

==== Mevlevihane ====
Mevlevihane was constructed in 1368–1369, by the architect Osmanoğlu Emetullah on an order by Sarunhanoğlu İshak Bey. During the Ottoman Empire it was restored three times, in 1664–1665, in 1681 and in 1693–1694.

In 1960, it was restored again; however, it became a ruin after a short time. It was lastly restored by Celal Bayar University in 1999–2001. Mevlevihane turned into a museum in 2005.

== Organization ==
Ahmet Ataç became the seventh president on July 29, 2019. President Ataç has three vice presidents and three advisers.

=== Presidents ===
	Name	Commenced term	Ended term
1.	Ümit Doğay Arınç	1992	1994
2.	Tuna Taner	1994	2002
3.	Cemil Özcan	2002	2006
4.	Semra Öncü	2006	2010
5.	Mehmet Pakdemirli	2010	2014
6.	A. Kemal Çelebi	2014	2019
7.	Ahmet Ataç	2019	N/A

MCBU Academic Divisions
College/school	Established
College of Medicine	1992
College of Economic and Administrative Sciences	1975
College of Engineering	1992
College of Arts and Sciences	1992
College of Education	1964
College of Sports Sciences	1959
College of Health Sciences	1996
Hasan Ferdi Turgutlu College of Technology	2012
College of Theology	2012
College of Business	2012
College of Fine Arts, Design and Architecture	2012
Salihli College of Economic and Administrative Sciences	2017
College of Dentistry*	2017
College of Communication*	2017
School of Tobacco Expertise	1975
School of Applied Sciences	1997
School of Foreign Languages**	2011
Graduate School of Social Sciences	1993
Graduate School of Natural Sciences	1993
Graduate School of Health Sciences	1995
*Degree-granting unit of MCBU but not started education yet
**Not a degree-granting unit of MCBU

=== Academic staff ===
As of fall 2017, MCBU employed 1,609 academic staff, including 1,037 instructional staff (faculty).

=== Colleges and academic divisions ===
There are 14 colleges, 3 schools, and 3 graduate schools at Manisa Celal Bayar University (see the table). MCBU is also responsible of governing 15 vocational schools, which are granting associate degrees.

=== Graduate schools ===
Manisa Celal Bayar University has 3 graduate schools that are responsible for its all graduate programs. Social and natural sciences graduate schools were established in 1993 and health sciences in 1995.

- Graduate School of Social Sciences
- Graduate School of Natural Sciences
- Graduate School of Health Sciences

== Academics ==
=== Classification ===
Manisa Celal Bayar University is one of the largest universities in Turkey and its programs are accredited by Diploma Supplement. Students may transfer their earned credits with confidence.

Also MCBU has accreditation for its engineering programs; EUR-ACE label and its medical degrees.

=== Degrees conferred ===
MCBU offers over 70 different undergraduate programs and over 90 different graduate programs.

MCBU conferred 9,755 degrees in the 2016–2017 academic year, including 4,116 bachelor's degrees, 283 master's degrees, and 36 doctorates degrees. The remaining 5,320 were associate degrees.

=== Research ===
Manisa Celal Bayar University has 14 research centers. Some examples are; Research Institute of Atatürk's Principles, Research Institute of Local Governance, Research Institute of the Turkish Handcraft of Manisa District, Research Institute of the History and Culture of Manisa District, Research Institute of Computing, Research Institute of Environmental Problems, and Research Institute of Health.

MCBU also houses a research center called Teknokent.

== Notable alumni ==
- Alp Kırşan, actor
- Bekir Pakdemirli, Minister of Agriculture and Forest
- Deniz Baysal, actress
- Eray Ataseven, Turkish footballer
- Hidayet Karaca, News presenter
- Kemal Özdeş, Turkish football manager
- Mert Yılmazyerli, Turkish chess player. 2021 Turkish Chess Champion.
- Özge Kanbay, was a Turkish woman's footballer, and female football referee
- Tevfik Lav, Turkish football manager
