= Women's World Chess Championship 2010 =

Chess tournament in Antakya, Turkey

The Women's World Chess Championship 2010 took place in Antakya, Turkey from December 2 through 24, 2010.

The tournament, like the previous ones, was played in a 64-player knock-out format. Each pairing consisted of two games, one with white and one with black, from which the winner advanced. In case of a tie, tiebreaks were played the next day, consisting of two rapid games and—if still tied—an Armageddon match. The final consisted of four games at classical time control, if necessary followed by four rapid tiebreak games.

The title was won by Hou Yifan from China who beat her compatriot Ruan Lufei in the final by 5–3, at 16 years of age making her the youngest Women's World Chess Champion in history.

== Participants ==
Players were seeded by their Elo ratings (November 2010 list), except that defending champion Alexandra Kosteniuk was the No. 1 seed.

1. Alexandra Kosteniuk (RUS), 2507, GM (WC)
2. Humpy Koneru (IND), 2600, GM (WC)
3. Hou Yifan (CHN), 2591, GM (WC)
4. Tatiana Kosintseva (RUS), 2581, GM (E09)
5. Nana Dzagnidze (GEO), 2551, GM (E08)
6. Antoaneta Stefanova (BUL), 2548, GM (R)
7. Anna Muzychuk (SLO), 2530, IM (R)
8. Pia Cramling (SWE), 2526, GM (WC)
9. Dronavalli Harika (IND), 2525, IM (J08)
10. Ju Wenjun (CHN), 2524, WGM (Z3.5)
11. Kateryna Lahno (UKR), 2522, GM (E08)
12. Viktorija Čmilytė (LTU), 2514, GM (E08)
13. Maia Chiburdanidze (GEO), 2502, GM (R)
14. Monika Soćko (POL), 2495, GM (E08)
15. Marie Sebag (FRA), 2494, GM (R)
16. Ruan Lufei (CHN), 2480, WGM (Z3.5)
17. Lilit Mkrtchian (ARM), 2479, IM (E08)
18. Anna Zatonskih (USA), 2478, IM (Z2.1)
19. Zhu Chen (QAT), 2477, GM (Z3.1)
20. Elisabeth Paehtz (GER), 2474, IM (E09)
21. Zhao Xue (CHN), 2474, GM (R)
22. Hoang Thanh Trang (HUN), 2473, GM (E09)
23. Natalija Pogonina (RUS), 2472, WGM (E08)
24. Elina Danielian (ARM), 2466, GM (E08)
25. Mariya Muzychuk (UKR), 2462, IM (E09)
26. Shen Yang (CHN), 2461, WGM (Z3.5)
27. Almira Skripchenko (FRA), 2460, IM (E08)
28. Anna Ushenina (UKR), 2460, IM (E08)
29. Yelena Dembo (GRE), 2454, IM (E08)
30. Natalia Zhukova (UKR), 2447, GM (E08)
31. Iweta Rajlich (POL), 2446, IM (E09)
32. Irina Turova (RUS), 2439, IM (E09)
33. Sopiko Khukhashvili (GEO), 2430, IM (E09)
34. Jovanka Houska (ENG), 2421, IM (E08)
35. Marina Romanko (RUS), 2414, IM (E09)
36. Batkhuyag Munguntuul (MGL), 2409, IM (Z3.3)
37. Cristina Adela Foișor (ROU), 2403, IM (E09)
38. Huang Qian (CHN), 2402, WGM (Z3.5)
39. Evgenija Ovod (RUS), 2387, IM (E09)
40. Tatiana Shadrina (RUS), 2384, WGM (E09)
41. Deysi Cori (PER), 2384, WGM (AM)
42. Baira Kovanova (RUS), 2380, WGM (E09)
43. Ding Yixin (CHN), 2370, WGM (AS)
44. Jolanta Zawadzka (POL), 2368, WGM (E09)
45. Martha Fierro Baquero (ECU), 2363, IM (AM)
46. Nafisa Muminova (UZB), 2360, WIM (Z3.4)
47. Maia Lomineishvili (GEO), 2347, IM (E08)
48. Zhang Xiaowen (CHN), 2339, WGM (AS)
49. Camilla Baginskaite (USA), 2336, WGM (Z2.1)
50. Irina Vasilevich (RUS), 2333, IM (E09)
51. Soumya Swaminathan (IND), 2332, WGM (J09)
52. Meenakshi Subbaraman (IND), 2328, WGM (AS)
53. Julia Demina (RUS), 2323, WGM (E08)
54. Kübra Öztürk (TUR), 2264, WIM (PN)
55. Arianne Caoili (AUS), 2242, WIM (Z3.6)
56. Nadig Kruttika (IND), 2230, WGM (Z3.2)
57. Betül Cemre Yıldız (TUR), 2252, WIM (PN)
58. Marisa Zuriel (ARG), 2208, WIM (Z2.5)
59. Ingrid Aliaga Fernández (PER), 2154, WFM (Z2.4)
60. Dina Kagramanov (CAN), 2101, WIM (Z2.2)
61. Mona Khaled (EGY), 2093, WGM (AF)
62. Carla Heredia Serrano (ECU), 2087, WIM (Z2.3)
63. Melissa Greeff (RSA), 2082, WGM (AF)
64. Amina Mezioud (ALG), 2029, WIM (AF)

=== Qualification paths ===
- WC: finalists and semifinalists of Women's World Chess Championship 2008 (4)
- J08 and J09: World Junior Champions 2008 and 2009
- R: Rating (average of the FIDE rating lists of July 2006 and January 2007) (5)
- E08 and E09: European Individual Championships 2008 and 2009 (28)
- AM: American Continental Chess Championship 2009 (2)
- AS: Asian Chess Championship 2009 (3)
- AF: African Chess Championship 2009 (3)
- Z2.1 (2), Z2.2, Z2.3, Z2.4, Z2.5, Z3.1, Z3.2, Z3.3, Z3.4, Z3.5 (4), Z3.6: Zonal tournaments 2009
- PN: FIDE President nominee (2)

=== Notable absentees ===
The number one woman in the world, Judit Polgár, never competed for the women's title and did not enter this time either. World number five, Nadezhda Kosintseva, did not play either, although her sister Tatiana (ranked 4th) did. Other names missing from the top 20 were: Irina Krush (17th), former finalist Alisa Galliamova (19th) and ex-champion Xu Yuhua (20th).

Iweta Rajlich and Arianne Caoili were listed as participants but unable to attend; their scheduled opponents, Jovanka Houska and Ju Wenjun, were given byes through to the second round.

== Results ==
=== Final match ===
Women's World Chess Championship Final 2010
	1	2	3	4	R1	R2	R3	R4	Total
Ruan Lufei (China)	½	0	½	1	½	0	½	0	3
Hou Yifan (China)	½	1	½	0	½	1	½	1	5

=== Bracket ===
1st Round
1	(Russia) Alexandra Kosteniuk	2
64	(Algeria) Amina Mezioud	0
33	(Russia) Irina Turova	½
32	(Georgia (country)) Sopiko Khukhashvili	1½
17	(China) Ruan Lufei	2½
48	(United States) Camilla Baginskaite	1½
49	(Armenia) Lilit Mkrtchian	1
16	(China) Zhang Xiaowen	3
9	(Sweden) Pia Cramling	½
56	(Turkey) Betül Cemre Yıldız	1½
41	(Ukraine) Mariya Muzychuk	2
24	(Peru) Deysi Cori	0
25	(India) Dronavalli Harika	1½
40	(India) Nadig Kruttika	½
57	(Armenia) Elina Danielian	0
8	(Russia) Tatiana Shadrina	2
5	(Russia) Tatiana Kosintseva	2
60	(Egypt) Mona Khaled	0
37	(Greece) Yelena Dembo	2½
28	(Mongolia) Batkhuyag Munguntuul	1½
21	(Georgia (country)) Maia Chiburdanidze	2
44	(India) Meenakshi Subbaraman	0
53	(China) Zhao Xue	1½
12	(Ecuador) Martha Fierro Baquero	½
13	(Georgia (country)) Nana Dzagnidze	2
52	(Canada) Dina Kagramanov	0
45	(France) Almira Skripchenko	3½
20	(Romania) Cristina Adela Foișor	2½
29	(Lithuania) Viktorija Čmilytė	2
36	(Russia) Julia Demina	0
61	(Germany) Elisabeth Paehtz	3
4	(Poland) Jolanta Zawadzka	1
3	(China) Hou Yifan	2
62	(Ecuador) Carla Heredia Serrano	0
35	(Ukraine) Natalia Zhukova	½
30	(Russia) Marina Romanko	1½
19	(Qatar) Zhu Chen	2
46	(Uzbekistan) Nafisa Muminova	0
51	(Poland) Monika Soćko	1½
14	(India) Soumya Swaminathan	½
11	(Bulgaria) Antoaneta Stefanova	2
54	(Peru) Ingrid Aliaga Fernández	0
43	(Ukraine) Anna Ushenina	1½
22	(China) Huang Qian	2½
27	(Hungary) Hoang Thanh Trang	2½
38	(China) Ding Yixin	1½
59	(Turkey) Kübra Öztürk	½
6	(Ukraine) Kateryna Lahno	1½
7	(Slovenia) Anna Muzychuk	2
58	(Argentina) Marisa Zuriel	0
39	(China) Shen Yang	½
26	(Russia) Evgenija Ovod	1½
23	(Russia) Baira Kovanova	2
42	(Russia) Natalija Pogonina	0
55	(Australia) Arianne Caoili
10	(China) Ju Wenjun	w/o
15	(France) Marie Sebag	2
50	(Russia) Irina Vasilevich	0
47	(Georgia (country)) Maia Lomineishvili	0
18	(United States) Anna Zatonskih	2
31	(Poland) Iweta Rajlich
34	(England) Jovanka Houska	w/o
63	(South Africa) Melissa Greeff	0
2	(India) Humpy Koneru	2

2nd Round
1	(Russia) Alexandra Kosteniuk	3
33	(Georgia (country)) Sopiko Khukhashvili	1
16	(China) Ruan Lufei	3
48	(China) Zhang Xiaowen	1
57	(Turkey) Betül Cemre Yıldız	0
25	(Ukraine) Mariya Muzychuk	2
9	(India) Dronavalli Harika	2
41	(Russia) Tatiana Shadrina	0
4	(Russia) Tatiana Kosintseva	½
29	(Greece) Yelena Dembo	1½
13	(Georgia (country)) Maia Chiburdanidze	½
20	(China) Zhao Xue	1½
5	(Georgia (country)) Nana Dzagnidze	1
28	(France) Almira Skripchenko	3
12	(Lithuania) Viktorija Čmilytė	2½
21	(Germany) Elisabeth Paehtz	1½
3	(China) Hou Yifan	1½
35	(Russia) Marina Romanko	½
19	(Qatar) Zhu Chen	3
14	(Poland) Monika Soćko	1
6	(Bulgaria) Antoaneta Stefanova	1
38	(China) Huang Qian	3
22	(Hungary) Hoang Thanh Trang	1
11	(Ukraine) Kateryna Lahno	3
7	(Slovenia) Anna Muzychuk	1½
39	(Russia) Evgenija Ovod	½
42	(Russia) Baira Kovanova	½
10	(China) Ju Wenjun	1½
15	(France) Marie Sebag	0
18	(United States) Anna Zatonskih	2
34	(England) Jovanka Houska	½
2	(India) Humpy Koneru	1½

3rd Round
1	(Russia) Alexandra Kosteniuk	1½
16	(China) Ruan Lufei	2½
25	(Ukraine) Mariya Muzychuk	3
9	(India) Dronavalli Harika	4
29	(Greece) Yelena Dembo	½
20	(China) Zhao Xue	1½
28	(France) Almira Skripchenko	4
12	(Lithuania) Viktorija Čmilytė	2
3	(China) Hou Yifan	2½
19	(Qatar) Zhu Chen	1½
38	(China) Huang Qian	½
11	(Ukraine) Kateryna Lahno	1½
7	(Slovenia) Anna Muzychuk	½
10	(China) Ju Wenjun	1½
18	(United States) Anna Zatonskih	½
2	(India) Humpy Koneru	1½

Quarterfinals
16	(China) Ruan Lufei	2½
9	(India) Dronavalli Harika	1½
20	(China) Zhao Xue	1½
28	(France) Almira Skripchenko	½
3	(China) Hou Yifan	1½
11	(Ukraine) Kateryna Lahno	½
10	(China) Ju Wenjun	½
2	(India) Humpy Koneru	1½

Semifinals
16	(China) Ruan Lufei	2½
20	(China) Zhao Xue	1½
3	(China) Hou Yifan	1½
2	(India) Humpy Koneru	½

Finals
16	(China) Ruan Lufei	3
3	(China) Hou Yifan	5
