= Cem Kaan Gökerkan =

Turkish chess grandmaster (born 2000)

Personal information
- Born: November 9, 2000 (age 25) İzmir, Turkey

Chess career
- Country: Turkey
- Title: Grandmaster (2023)
- FIDE rating: 2497 (July 2026)
- Peak rating: 2523 (November 2023)

Cem Kaan Gökerkan is a Turkish chess grandmaster.

== Chess career ==
In November 2020, he finished third place in the Turkish Chess Championship behind Vahap Şanal and Melih Yurtseven. In September 2022, he finished in 7th place out of over 400 players in the Titled Tuesday tournament. In December 2025, he finished at second place in the Turkish Chess Championship after losing in final round against Işık Can.

He was awarded the Grandmaster title in 2023, after achieving his norms at the:

- Riga Technical University Open in August 2017
- Caissa Hotel Chess Tournament in April 2023
- International Baku Open Chess Festival in May 2023
