= Kıvanç =

Kıvanç is a Turkish given name for (mostly) males and a surname; it means 'joyful pride'.

People named Kıvanç include:

== Given name ==
- Kıvanç Dinçsalman (born 1983), Turkish taekwondo practitioner
- Kemal Kıvanç Elgaz (born 1986), Turkish volleyball player
- Kıvanç Haznedaroğlu (born 1981), Turkish chess grandmaster
- Kıvanç Karakaş (born 1985), Turkish footballer
- Kıvanç Tatlıtuğ (born 1983), Turkish actor and model

== Surname ==
- Halit Kıvanç (1925–2022), Turkish television and radio presenter, humorist, sports journalist, and writer
