= Ilhan =

İlhan is a Turkish male given name and a surname. It is also used as a feminine given name. Notable with the name include:

== Given name ==
- İlhan Eker (born 1983), Turkish footballer
- İlhan Fakılı (born 2006), Turkish footballer
- İlhan İrem (1955–2022), Turkish singer
- İlhan Koman (1921–1986), Turkish sculptor
- İlhan Mansız (born 1975), Turkish football player
- İlhan Mimaroğlu (1926–2012), Turkish composer
- Ilhan Omar (born 1982), American politician
- İlhan Onat (1929–2013), Turkish chess player
- İlhan Parlak (born 1987), Turkish footballer
- İlhan Şeşen (1948–2025), Turkish musician, songwriter, and actor
- İlhan Usmanbaş (1921–2025), Turkish composer

== Surname ==
- Adem Ilhan (born 1977), Turkish-English musician
- Attilâ İlhan (1925–2005), Turkish poet
- Çolpan İlhan (1936–2014), Turkish cinema and theatre actress
- John Ilhan (1965–2007), Australian businessman
- Marsel İlhan (born 1987), Turkish tennis player
- Müfide İlhan (1911–1996), Turkish mayor
- Rabia İlhan (born 1981), Turkish lawyer and politician

== See also ==
- Emirhan İlkhan (born 2004), Turkish footballer
