= Zehra Topel =

Turkish chess player (born 1987)

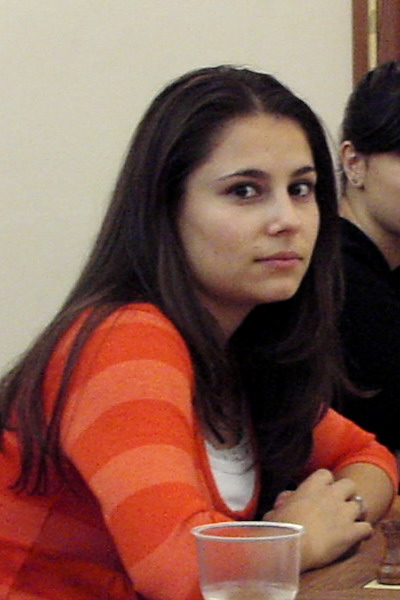
- Zehra Topel (2007)

Personal information
- Born: April 13, 1987 (age 39) Shumen, Bulgaria

Chess career
- Country: Turkey
- Title: Woman International Master (2007)
- Peak rating: 2256 (October 2006)

Zehra Topel (Bulgarian: Зехра Топел; born April 13, 1987) is a Turkish chess player. Since 2007, she holds the FIDE title of Woman International Master (WIM).

Topel was born on April 13, 1987, in Shumen, Bulgaria to Bulgarian Turkish parents. Her father Cengiz Topel is a chess trainer and her mother Vildan is a nurse. She began with chess playing at the age eight when her mother presented Zehra's cousin a chess board, and her father instructed her. She moved with her father in 1997 to Istanbul, Turkey while the mother stayed in the time being in Bulgaria with Zehra's older sister Hatice. Zehra applied for Turkish citizenship, but had to wait for four years to get naturalized. In 2000, Zehra Topel was granted Turkish citizenship.

In the two years from 1995 to 1997 in Bulgaria, she won many titles in her age category. However, during the time span of the first four years in Turkey, she was not permitted to represent Turkey. She spent the time before naturalization by training at home because she was not allowed to play in official national tournaments but only in unofficial ones.

She won the silver medal at the 1st Mediterranean women's championship held in Lebanon in October 2003. In 2007, she was awarded the Woman International Master (WIM) title. In 2009, Zehra Topel became second in the Turkish Championship with 8/9, losing only to multiple Turkish champion WIM Betül Cemre Yıldız. She plays also simultaneous chess.

Zehra Topel attended Vissh Pedagogicheski Institut v Shumen in Bulgaria studying Anglistics. She later was educated at the Istanbul Kültür University on a chess scholarship.

== Achievements ==
Turkish Chess Championship (Women's)

- 2001 U14 - champion
- 2003 U16 - champion
- 2007 - champion
- 2009 - 2nd place

European Chess Championship

- 2002 - 7th place
- 2003 Junior - champion

Mediterranean Chess Championship

- 2003 - Silver
