= Kıvanç Haznedaroğlu =

Turkish chess grandmaster

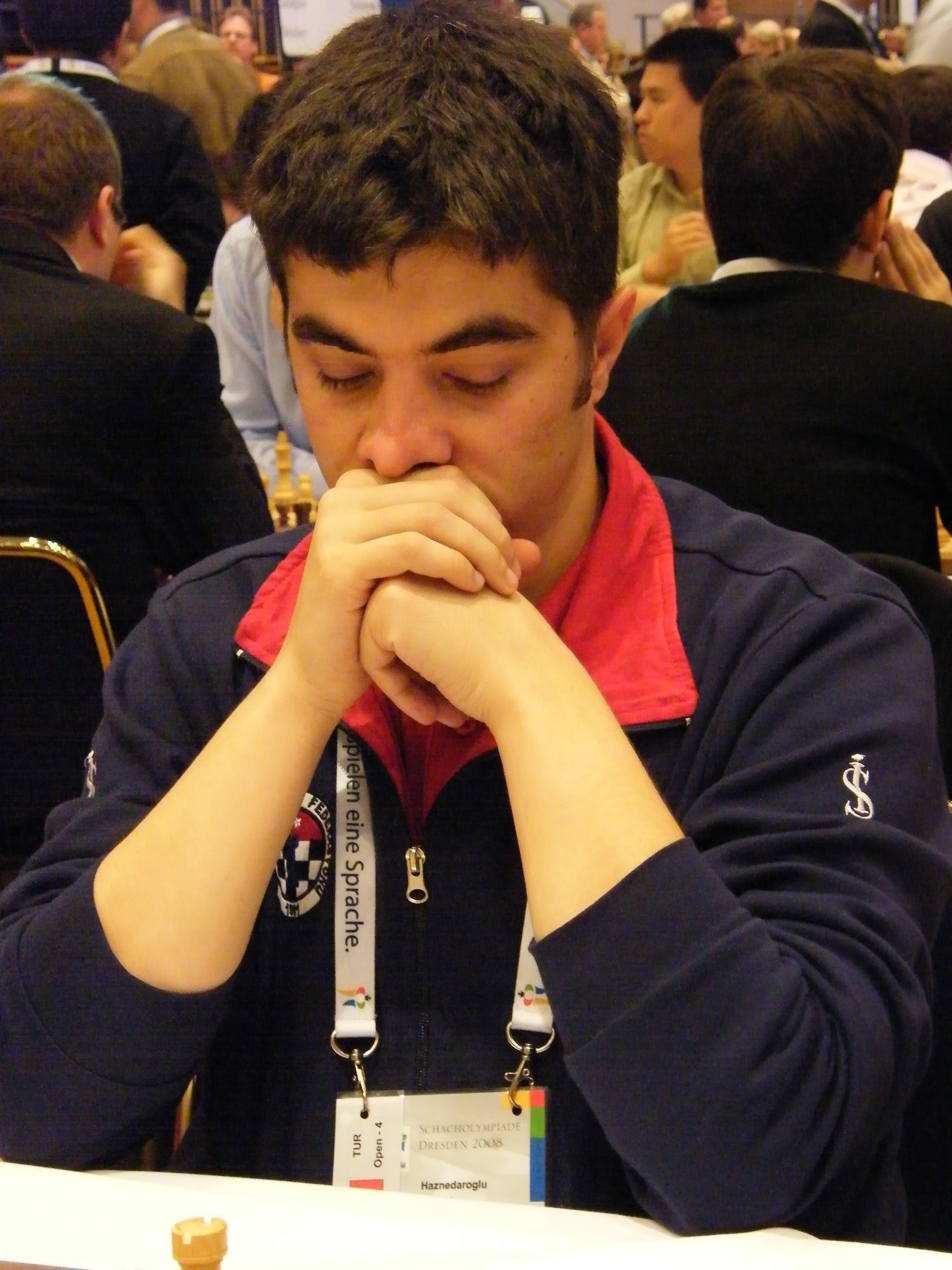
- Kıvanç Haznedaroğlu at the 38th Chess Olympiad, Dresden, Germany in 2008

Personal information
- Born: January 1, 1981 (age 45) Ankara, Turkey

Chess career
- Country: Turkey
- Title: Grandmaster (2009)
- Peak rating: 2510 (May 2017)

Kıvanç Haznedaroğlu (born 1 January 1981) is a Turkish chess Grandmaster and a FIDE trainer. As of the July 2013 FIDE rating list, he is ranked among active players number 1,798 in the world and number twelve in Turkey. He earned the title of Grandmaster (GM) on 18 October 2009. He studied Hydrogeology at Hacettepe University in Ankara.

== Chess career ==
Haznedaroğlu was born on 1 January 1981 in Ankara as the youngest of three boys. At the age of five or six, he got interested in chess playing as his uncle, a mathematics teacher, was training Kıvanç's older brothers. His father introduced then Kıvanç in chess. Already in 1987, he became champion in the national intra primary school tournament. He repeated his first place in the 1989-90 Turkish championship. During his high school years, he became always Turkish champion in his age category. His first international experience was at 1999 Balkan Chess Championship in Varna, Bulgaria. Even though he won his first game against an International Master from Yugoslavia, he lost the following games and had to realize that there was a remarkable level difference between the Turkish and foreign chess players. In 2003, he became Turkish champion.

The turning point for him came when he took part at the FIDE World Chess Championship 2004 held in Tripoli, Libya. He played against Russian Vladimir Malakhov, lost with ½ to 1½. He was very happy to get ½ points from a high-level chess player. In 2008, he participated at the 38th Chess Olympiad held in Dresden, Germany, where he reached a score of 6½/9 by winning against Stuart Conquest (ENG), Sami Laouini (TUN), Luis Pan Zhang (PAN), Rinat Jumabayev (KAZ), Mohamed Amine Haddouche (ALG), Roger I. Nokes (NZL) and tying with Viesturs Meijers (LAT) but losing to Jakob Vang Glud (DEN) and Niclas Huschenbeth (GER).

After winning the third game at Izmir Chess Open in August 2009, he qualified for the Grand Master title.

== Achievements ==
Turkish Chess Championship

- 2003 – champion
- 2006 – 4th place
