= Ekaterina Atalik =

Russian-Turkish chess player (born 1982)

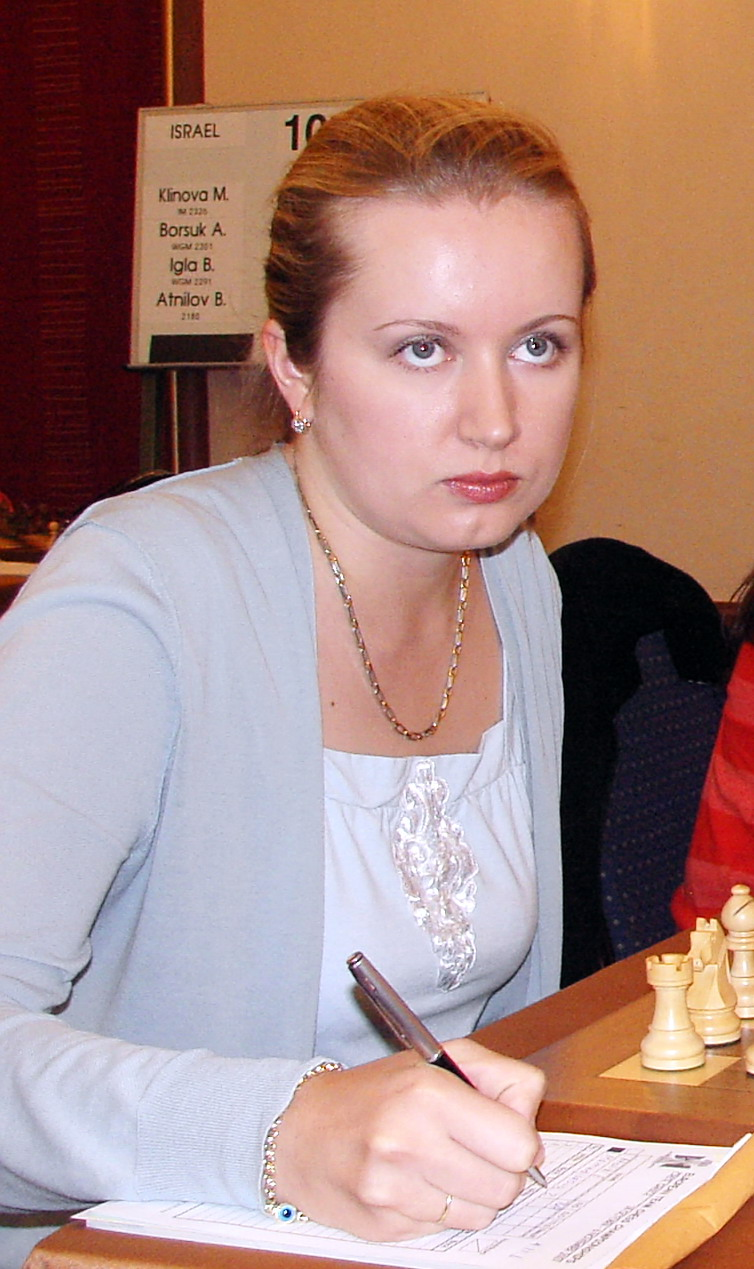

Personal information
- Born: 14 November 1982 (age 43) Kirov, Russian SFSR, Soviet Union
- Spouse: Suat Atalık (m. 2005)

Chess career
- Country: Russia (until 2005); Turkey (since 2005)
- Title: International Master (2007); Woman Grandmaster (2001)
- Peak rating: 2481 (September 2011)

Ekaterina Atalik (née Polovnikova; born 14 November 1982 in Kirov) is a Russian-Turkish chess player, who holds the titles of International Master (IM) and Woman Grandmaster (WGM).

She won the European Youth Chess Championship in the under-16 girls' section in 1997.

In 2005, she married Grandmaster Suat Atalık from Turkey, and obtained Turkish citizenship. She took clear second place, behind her husband, at the 3rd Mediterranean Chess Championship, held from 31 January to 8 February 2006 in Antalya, and was declared Mediterranean women's champion.

In April 2006, she won the 7th European Women's Chess Championship in Kuşadası, Turkey. Atalik also won the Turkish women's championship in 2008 and 2016.

In January 2016, she took clear first place in the 15th Prague Open with a score of 8/9, a full point ahead of the nearest followers.

== Notable games ==
- Nino Khurtsidze vs Ekaterina Polovnikova-Atalik, FIDE Women's World Championship 2004, English Opening: Anglo-Slav Variation, General (A11), ½-½
- Ekaterina Polovnikova-Atalik vs Almira Skripchenko-Lautier, Biel Int'l Festival (Ladies) 2006, Indian Game: Budapest Defense (A51), 1-0
