= Turhan Yılmaz =

Turkish chess player (born 1958)

Personal information
- Born: 11 September 1958 (age 67)

Chess career
- Country: Turkey
- Title: International Master (1986)
- FIDE rating: 2145 (February 2020)
- Peak rating: 2364 (January 2005)

Turhan Yılmaz (born 11 September 1958) is a Turkish chess player. He is five-time Turkish Chess Champion.

== Biography ==
Yılmaz earned FIDE title, International Master (IM) in 1986. He won the 1978, 1979, 1986, 1989 and 2004 Turkish Chess Championships. As a national player, he took part in the 26th, 27th, 28th, 29th, 30th, 32nd, 33rd and 36th Chess Olympiad.

His sisters Gülümser Öney and Gülsevil Yılmaz became Turkish Women's Chess Champion.

== Achievements ==
- 1978 Turkish Chess Championship – Champion
- 1979 Turkish Chess Championship – Champion
- 1986 Turkish Chess Championship – Champion
- 1989 Turkish Chess Championship – Champion
- 2004 Turkish Chess Championship – Champion
