= Suat Soylu =

Turkish chess player

Personal information
- Born: September 24, 1960 (age 65) Niğde, Turkey

Chess career
- Title: International Master (2002)
- Peak rating: 2416 (October 2004)

Suat Soylu is a Turkish chess player and a former Turkish Chess Champion.

== Biography ==
Soylu was born in 1960 in Niğde, started playing chess in 1974. He won the 1981 Turkish Chess Championship and was the runner-up in the 1998 Turkish Chess Championship. He played for the Turkish national team at Chess Olympiads of 1984, 1990, 1992 ,1994, 1998, 2000 and 2002. Soylu won the individual silver medal for his board at 29th Chess Olympiad and 35th Chess Olympiad.

Soylu earned FIDE title, International Master (IM) in 2003.
