= Abidinpaşa =

- Neighbourhood
- Location in Turkey Abidinpaşa (Turkey Central Anatolia)
- Coordinates: 39°56′N 32°53′E
- Country: Turkey
- Province: Ankara
- District: Kızılcahamam
- Population (2022): 12,184
- Time zone: UTC+3 (TRT)

Abidinpaşa is a neighbourhood in the municipality and district of Mamak, Ankara Province, Turkey. Its population is 12,184 (2022).

The town takes its name from a pasha by the name of Abidin. He was assigned an Ottoman administrator in Ankara around the mid-1800s. He used to like fresh air, therefore he had his mansion (governor building) built in modern Abidinpaşa, which is a place on top of one of the highest hills in Ankara. The area, where the mansion is, is a public park and the mansion serves as an historical place to tourists today.

One of the largest hospitals in Ankara Province, the Ankara University Hospital, is located in the town.
