= Kruttika Nadig =

Indian chess player (born 1988)

Personal information
- Born: 17 February 1988 (age 38) Maharashtra, India

Chess career
- Country: India
- Title: Woman Grandmaster (2009)
- Peak rating: 2387 (October 2008)

Kruttika Nadig (born 17 February 1988) is an Indian chess player. She holds the title of Woman Grandmaster (WGM) and won the Indian national women's championship in 2008. Nadig competed in the Women's World Chess Championship 2010; she was knocked out in the first round by compatriot Harika Dronavalli. She played for India in the Women's World Team Chess Championship and Women's Asian Team Chess Championship in 2009, and for India women's team in the World Youth U16 Chess Olympiad in 2003. She is also a journalist.
