= Umut Atakişi =

Turkish chess player (born 1981)

Personal information
- Born: 1 February 1981 (age 45) İstanbul, Turkey

Chess career
- Country: Turkey
- Title: International Master (2004)
- Peak rating: 2441 (January 2006)

Umut Atakişi (born 1 February 1981, İstanbul) is a Turkish chess player and three-time Turkish Chess Champion.

== Biography ==
Atakişi was born in 1981, started playing chess at the age of nine. He earned FIDE title, International Master (IM) in 2003. He won the 1999, 2001 and 2005 Turkish Chess Championships. As a national player, he took part in the 34th, 35th, 36th, 37th Chess Olympiad.
