= Can Arduman =

Turkish chess player (born 1959)

Personal information
- Born: 1959 (age 66–67) İstanbul, Turkey

Chess career
- Country: Turkey
- Title: International Master (1996)
- FIDE rating: 2320 (September 2015)
- Peak rating: 2414 (January 1999)

Can Arduman (born 1959 in İstanbul) is a Turkish chess player. He is a six-time Turkish Chess Champion.

Arduman was born in 1959 in Istanbul, started playing chess at the age of 11, earned FIDE title, International Master (IM) in 1996. He won the 1993, 1994, 1996, 1997, 1998 and 2002 Turkish Chess Championship.
