= Suat Atalık =

Turkish-Bosnian chess grandmaster (born 1964)

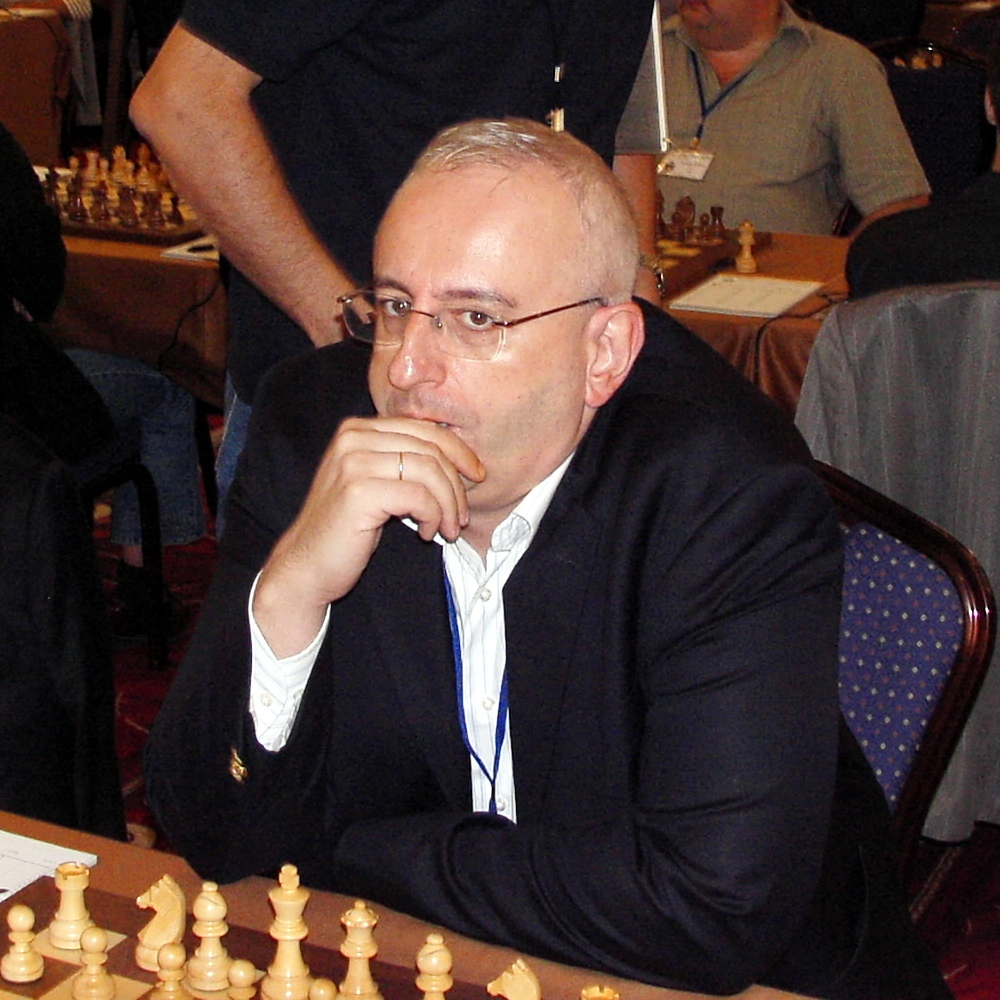
- Atalık in 2007

Personal information
- Born: October 10, 1964 (age 61) Istanbul, Turkey
- Spouse: Ekaterina Polovnikova (m. 2005)

Chess career
- Country: Bosnia and Herzegovina (until 2005); Turkey (2005–2019); Serbia (since 2019)
- Title: Grandmaster (1994)
- Peak rating: 2632 (April 2006)
- Peak ranking: No. 77 (January 1998)

Suat Atalık (Serbian: Суат Аталик; born October 10, 1964) is a Turkish-Bosnian chess grandmaster playing for Serbia. He is a three-time Turkish Chess Champion and the first Turkish chess-player ever to obtain title of chess Grandmaster.

== Chess career ==
He was born in Turkey in 1964, represented Turkey in the World Junior Chess Championship in 1983, and was their top board for several Chess Olympiads.

Despite this, and his current residence in Istanbul, he had disputes with chess organizers in his country, so he declared himself to be a resident of Bosnia and Herzegovina, his ancestral home.

In 1997, Atalik tied for first place at the U.S. Masters Chess Championship.

During the 2000 Chess Olympiad in Istanbul, Atalik insisted on playing for Bosnia rather than Turkey. As a result, the organizers of the Olympiad banned him from the competition. After the selection of the new national chess federation he returned to the Turkish national team.

In 2003, he took first at Mar del Plata. In 2007 he tied for first with Michael Roiz at the Gorenje Valjevo Tournament.

Atalık won the 3rd and 4th Mediterranean Chess Championships in Antalya, Turkey and Cannes, France, respectively.

He was the only Grandmaster registered in the Turkish Chess Federation in Turkey beginning in 1994 and ending in 2005, when Mikhail Gurevich took up residence there.

== Notable games ==
- Suat Atalik vs Gyula Sax, Maroczy mem 1997, Nimzo-Indian Defense: Classical, Noa Variation, San Remo Variation (E37), 1-0
- Florian Handke vs Suat Atalik, 16th open 2000, King's Indian Defense: Orthodox Variation, Donner Defense (E94), 0-1
- Zurab Sturua vs Suat Atalik, Bled Olympiad 2002, Slav Defense: Chameleon Variation, Advance System (D15), 0-1
- Suat Atalik vs Pablo Zarnicki, Bled Olympiad 2002, Queen's Indian Defense: Kasparov-Petrosian. Classical Variation (E12), 1-0

== Personal life ==
He attended Galatasaray Lycee and studied Psychology in Boğaziçi University. On November 11, 2005 he married 22-year-old woman grandmaster Ekaterina Polovnikova from Russia. Former world championship challenger Nigel Short, who also played in the World Junior Championship in 1983, was his best man. He has a son named Vadim, born in 2006.
