= Cemil Gülbaş =

Turkish chess player (born 1980)

Personal information
- Born: June 27, 1980 (age 46)

Chess career
- Title: International Master (2009)
- Peak rating: 2444 (October 2004)

Cemil Gülbaş (born 1980) is a Turkish chess player with the title International Master. He is the 2018 Turkish Chess Champion.

- In June 2004 he participated in the Echternach Open tournament, with 352 players. Gülbas reached a shared 8th place with 7 points out of 9 rounds, one point below the winner, GM Leonid Kritz.
- In December 2007 he became 8th at the "IM Norm Tournament", held in Eupen.
- Gülbaş earned the FIDE title International Master (IM) in 2009.
- June 2012 he participated, with in total 114 players, at the Klenkes-Cup, in Aachen. He finished at place 27th.
- He won the 2018 Turkish Chess Championship held in Antalya.
- In 2019 he became 5th at the blitz tournament organised by Galatasaray.
