= Nevzat Süer =

Turkish chess player

- Born: 1925
- Died: 23 March 1987 (aged 61–62)
- Title: International Master (1975)

Nevzat Süer (1925 – 23 March 1987) was a Turkish chess player. He was a Turkish Chess Champion.

== Biography ==
Süer was born in 1925, graduated from Haydarpaşa High School and started playing chess in 1943. He earned FIDE title, International Master (IM) in 1975, making him the very first Turkish IM. He is considered one of the pioneers of Turkish modern chess history with his articles in Cumhuriyet newspaper and the Süer Chess Magazine he published.

He died in 1987. After his death, Turkey's first chess park, opened in Yalova in 2016, was named after him.
