= İsmet İbrahimoğlu =

Turkish chess player (1943–1988)

- Born: 1943; Yugoslavia
- Died: 1988 (aged 44–45)
- Title: Turkish Chess Champion

İsmet İbrahimoğlu (1943–1988) was a Turkish chess player. He was three-time Turkish Chess Champion.

== Biography ==
İbrahimoğlu was born in 1943 in Yugoslavia, started playing chess in 1962. He won the 1967, 1970 and 1971 Turkish Chess Championship. He took part in the 17th, 18th and 19th Chess Olympiad Turkish National Team. At the 1966 Olympiad in Havana, he scored 10/13, won the individual bronze medal for his board. He also played against Bobby Fischer in the 6th round at the 19th World Chess Olympiad held in Siegen.

He died in 1988. In his memory, the 2018 Turkish Chess Championship was named after him.
