= Mert Yılmazyerli =

Turkish chess grandmaster (born 1992)

Personal information
- Born: 17 September 1992 (age 33)

Chess career
- Country: Turkey
- Title: Grandmaster (2022)
- FIDE rating: 2474 (July 2026)
- Peak rating: 2542 (April 2023)

Mert Yılmazyerli (born 17 September 1992) is a Turkish chess player. He is a two-time Turkish Chess Champion.

== Life and career ==
Yılmazyerli was born in Turkey in 1992, studied at Manisa Celal Bayar University. As a chess player, he earned FIDE title, International Master (IM) in 2014 and became Grandmaster (GM) in 2022. He won the 2021 and 2023 Turkish Chess Championships and was the runner-up in the 2016 Turkish Chess Championship. He played for the Turkish national team at 21st European Team Chess Championship held in Hersonissos 2017.

== Achievements ==
- 2023 Turkish Chess Championship – Champion
- 2022 Turkish Chess Championship - 2nd
- 2021 Turkish Chess Championship – Champion
- 2019 Turkish Chess Championship - 3nd
- 2019 Turkish Rapid and Blitz Chess Championship - 2nd
- 2016 Turkish Chess Championship – 2nd
