= Dina Kagramanov =

Canadian chess player (born 1986)

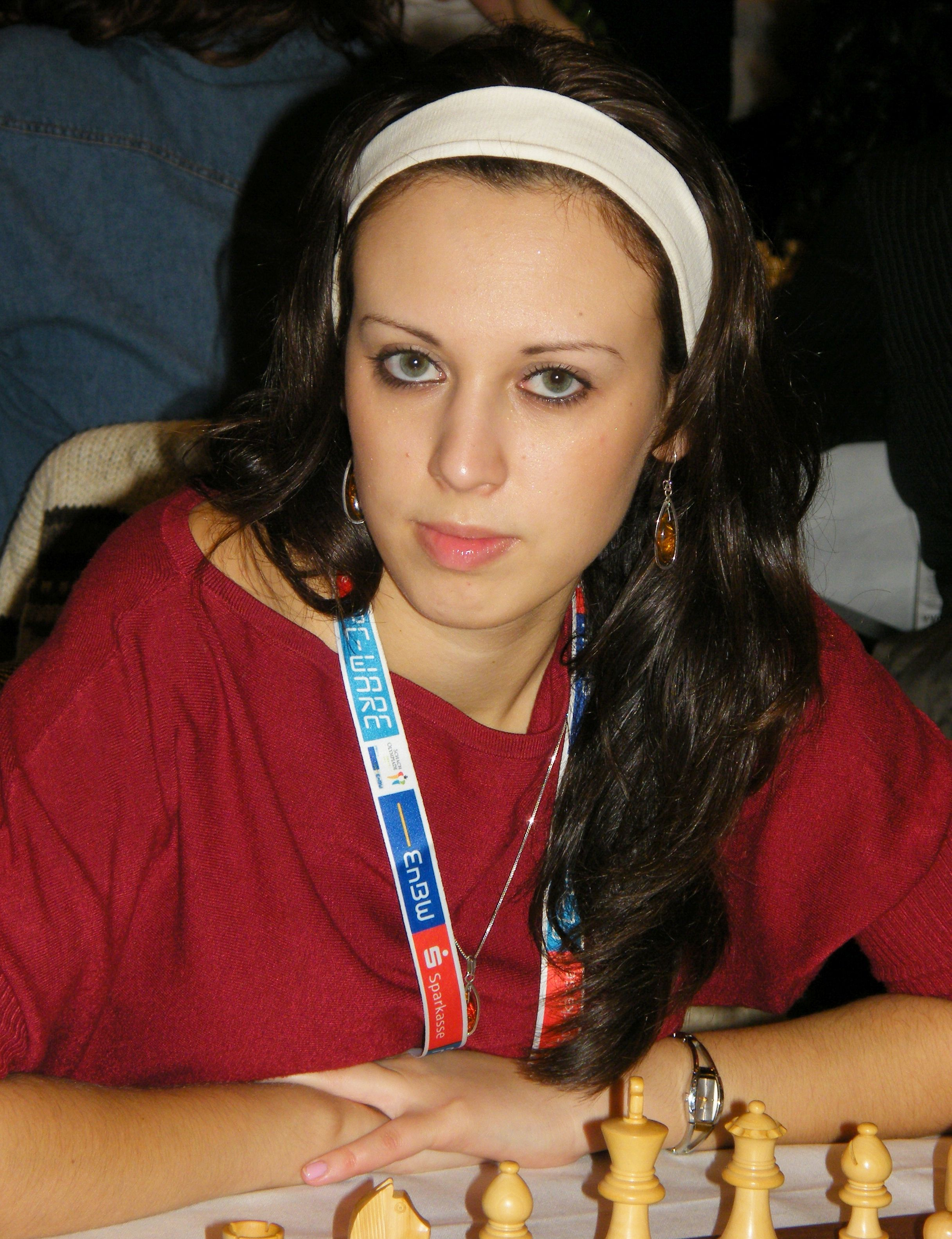
- Kagramanov in 2008

Personal information
- Born: 24 August 1986 (age 39) Baku, Azerbaijan

Chess career
- Country: Canada
- Title: Woman International Master (2009)
- FIDE rating: 2067 (September 2011)
- Peak rating: 2123 (January 2009)

Dina Kagramanov (Azerbaijani: Dina Kahramanov; born 24 August 1986), is an Azerbaijan-born Canadian chess player who holds the FIDE title of Woman International Master (WIM, 2009). She won the Canadian Women's Chess Championship twice.

== Biography ==
In 2003, Dina Kagramanov won the Canadian Girls Chess Championship in the U18 age group. In 2005, she won the Toronto Women's Chess Championship. In 2009, Dina Kagramanov for the first time won the Canadian Women's Chess Championship. In 2010, Kagramanov participated in Women's World Chess Championship by knock-out system and in the first round lost to Nana Dzagnidze.

She played for Canada in the Women's Chess Olympiads:

- In 2002, at the second board in the 35th Chess Olympiad (women) in Bled (+6, =3, -3),
- In 2008, at the third board in the 38th Chess Olympiad (women) in Dresden (+5, =1, -3),
- In 2010, at the second board in the 39th Chess Olympiad (women) in Khanty-Mansiysk (+5, =1, -3).

In 2009, Kagramanov was awarded the FIDE Woman International Master (WIM) title.
