= Işık Can =

Turkish chess grandmaster (born 2005)

Personal information
- Born: April 20, 2005 (age 21)

Chess career
- Country: Turkey
- Title: Grandmaster (2025)
- FIDE rating: 2569 (September 2026)
- Peak rating: 2573 (August 2026)

Işık Can is a Turkish chess grandmaster.

== Chess career ==
In December 2024, he earned his final GM norm at the U.S. Masters Chess Championship, becoming Turkey's 17th grandmaster.

He was awarded the Grandmaster title in 2025, after achieving his norms at the:

- Vaujany Chess Festival in July 2022
- Marianbad Open in January 2023
- U.S. Masters Chess Championship in December 2024

In December 2025, he won the Turkish Chess Championship, defeating Cem Kaan Gökerkan in the finals.
