= Mamak, Ankara =

Mamak
- District and municipality
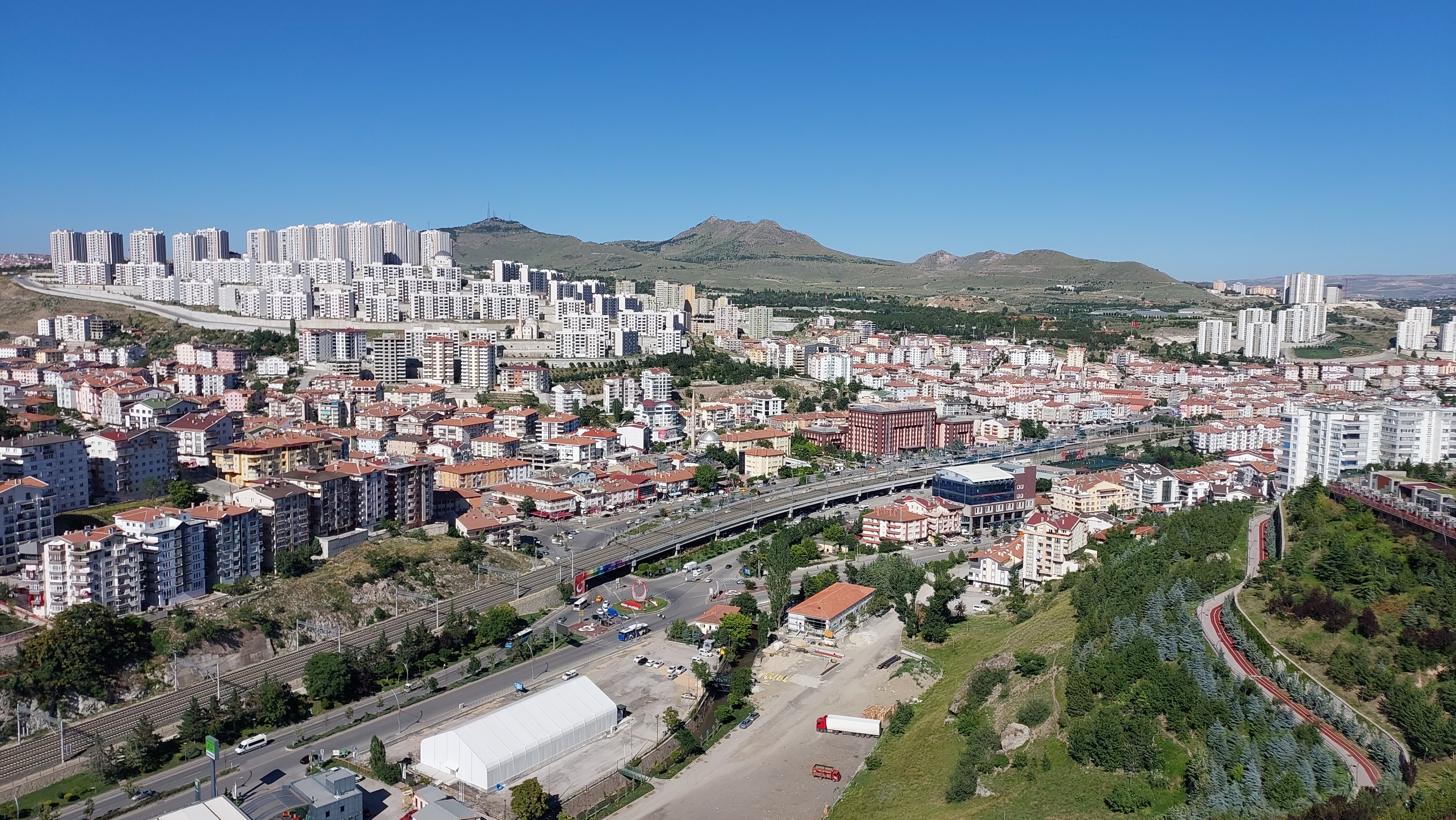

- Logo

- Map showing Mamak District in Ankara Province

- Location within Turkey Location within Turkey Central Anatolia
- Coordinates: 39°56′32″N 32°55′23″E
- Country: Turkey
- Province: Ankara

Government
  - Mayor: Veli Gündüz Şahin (CHP)
- Area: 321 km^{2} (124 sq mi)
- Elevation: 950 m (3,120 ft)
- Population (2022): 687,535
  - Density: 2,140/km^{2} (5,550/sq mi)
- Time zone: UTC+3 (TRT)
- Postal code: 06260
- Area code: 0312
- Website: www.mamak.bel.tr

Mamak is a municipality and metropolitan district of Ankara Province, Turkey. Its area is 321 km^{2}, and its population is 687,535 (2022). It is part of the city of Ankara. Its elevation is 950 m (3,117 ft).

Important public buildings include an infamous military prison which has been the subject of legend; the military electronic surveillance centre; and Ankara's largest rubbish dump.

== Demographics ==
Historical population
Year	Pop.	±% p.a.
2007	503,663	—
2012	559,597	+2.13%
2017	637,935	+2.66%
2022	687,535	+1.51%
Source: TÜIK (2007-2022)

== Composition ==
There are 64 neighbourhoods in Mamak District:

- Abidinpaşa
- Akdere
- Akşemsettin
- Altıağaç
- Altınevler
- Araplar
- Aşık Veysel
- Bahçeleriçi
- Bahçelerüstü
- Balkiraz
- Başak
- Bayındır
- Boğaziçi
- Bostancık
- Büyükkayaş
- Çağlayan
- Cengizhan
- Çiğiltepe
- Demirlibahçe
- Derbent
- Diriliş
- Dostlar
- Durali Alıç
- Dutluk
- Ege
- Ekin
- Fahri Korutürk
- General Zeki Doğan
- Gökçeyurt
- Gülveren
- Harman
- Hürel
- Hüseyingazi
- Karaağaç
- Karşıyaka
- Kartaltepe
- Kazım Orbay
- Kıbrısköy
- Kızılca
- Köstence
- Küçük Kayaş
- Kusunlar
- Kutlu
- Kutludüğün
- Lalahan
- Mehtap
- Misket
- Mutlu
- Ortaköy
- Peyami Safa
- Şafaktepe
- Şahap Gürler
- Şahintepe
- Saimekadın
- Şehit Cengiz Topel
- Şirintepe
- Tepecik
- Türközü
- Tuzluçayır
- Üreğil
- Yeni Bayındır
- Yeşilbayır
- Yukarı Imrohor
- Zirvekent

== Notable people ==
- Kübra Öztürk (born 1991), Woman Grandmaster of chess
- Mustafa Yılmaz (born 1992), Grandmaster of chess
