= Carla Heredia Serrano =

Ecuadorian chess player (born 1991)

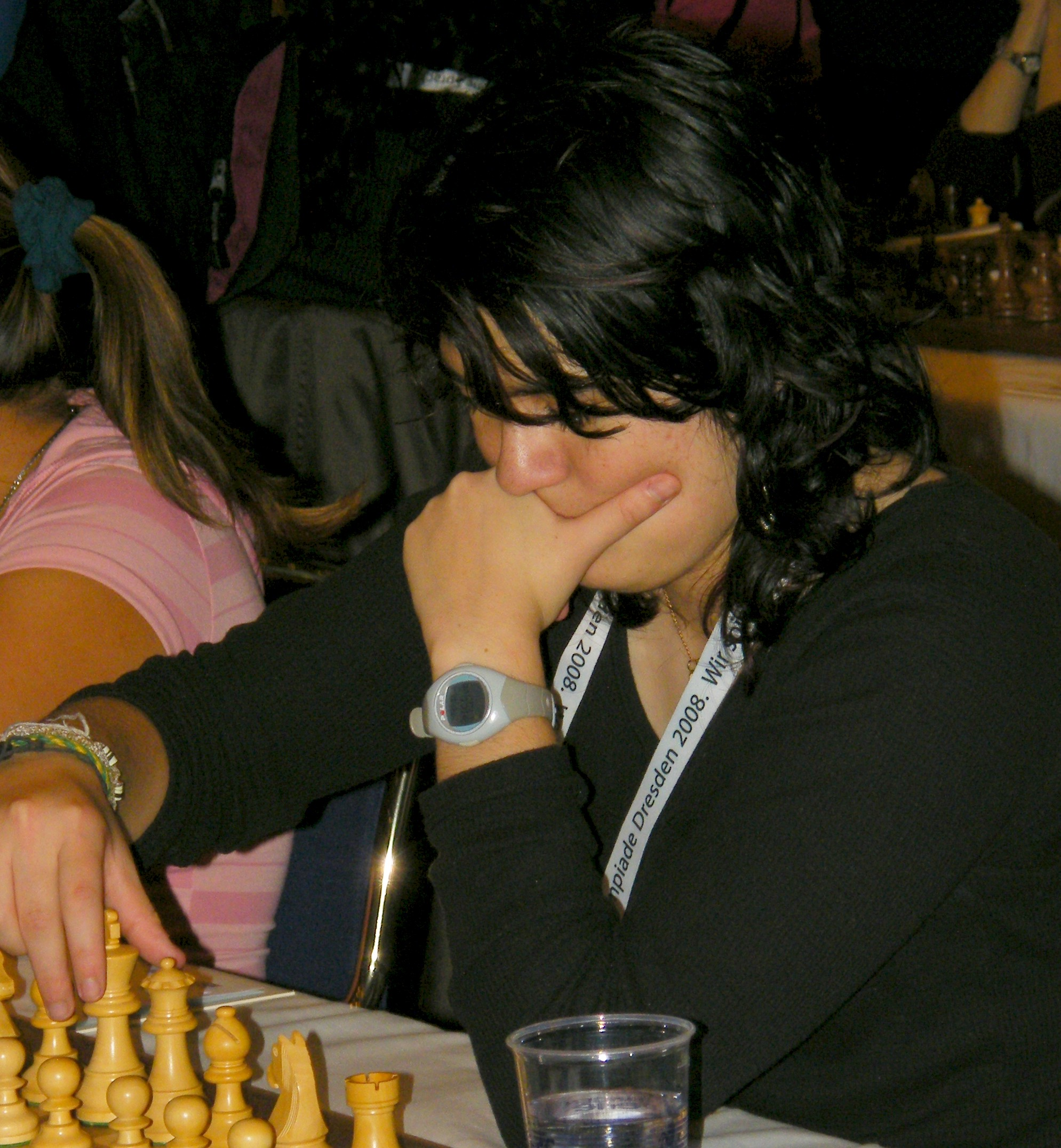
- Heredia in 2008

Personal information
- Born: 10 February 1991 (age 35) Quito, Ecuador

Chess career
- Country: Ecuador
- Title: Woman Grandmaster (2013)
- Peak rating: 2250 (May 2013)

Carla Heredia Serrano (born 10 February 1991) is an Ecuadorian chess player and Woman Grandmaster (WGM, 2013).

== Biography ==
Heredia has won nine Ecuadorian Girl's Chess Championships in different age groups. She three times participated in World Girls' Junior Chess Championships (2009-2011). In 2009, she won the American Girl's Chess Championship in U20 age group and Ecuadorian Women's Chess Championship, and has become the winner of the FIDE Women's World Chess Championship South American Zonal Tournament and got the right to participate in the finals. In 2010 Heredia participated in Women's World Chess Championship by knock-out system and in the first round lost to Hou Yifan.

Heredia played for Ecuador in the Women's Chess Olympiads:

- In 2008, at fourth board in the 38th Chess Olympiad (women) in Dresden (+2, =2, -5),
- In 2012, at second board in the 40th Chess Olympiad (women) in Istanbul (+3, =1, -5),
- In 2014, at first board in the 41st Chess Olympiad (women) in Tromsø (+2, =3, -4),
- In 2016, at second board in the 42nd Chess Olympiad (women) in Baku (+5, =2, -3),
- In 2018, at second board in the 43rd Chess Olympiad (women) in Batumi (+4, =3, -3).

In 2010, she was awarded the FIDE Woman International Master (WIM) title and received the FIDE Woman Grandmaster (WGM) title three year later.
