= Oğulcan Kanmazalp =

Turkish International Master of chess (born 1992)

Personal information
- Born: 22 July 1992 (age 33) İzmir, Turkey

Chess career
- Country: Turkey
- Title: International Master (2010)
- FIDE rating: 2448 (July 2026)
- Peak rating: 2481 (May 2018)

Oğulcan Kanmazalp (born 22 July 1992) is a Turkish chess player who holds the FIDE title of International Master (2010).

He was born in İzmir on 22 July 1992. After finishing the primary school in his hometown, he was educated in St. Joseph High School in Istanbul.

Oğulcan Kanmazalp began with chess playing at the age of eight. He was named FIDE Master (FM) in 2008, and International Master (IM) in 2010. he became in 2010 Turkish Chess champion. He is member of the national chess team.

== Achievements ==
- 2005 Turkish 14 Age Group – champion
- 2005 Balkan Chess Games U20 – champion
- 2007 Turkish 16 Age Group – second place
- 2010 Turkish Championship – champion
