= İlhan Onat =

Turkish chess player

Personal information
- Born: 5 December 1929 Istanbul, Turkey
- Died: 13 May 2013 (aged 83) İzmir, Turkey

Chess career
- Title: International Master (1975)
- Peak rating: 2365 (January 1979)

İlhan Onat (5 December 1929 – 13 May 2013) was a Turkish chess player and pharmacist. He was three-time Turkish Chess Champion and the first Turkish player to obtain the title of International Master (IM).

== Biography ==
Onat was born in Istanbul in 1929 and moved to İzmir in 1930 with his family. He started playing chess at İzmir Atatürk High School, graduated from the Faculty of Pharmacy of Istanbul University. Onat, who met strong players while he was a student in Istanbul, took a break from chess when he returned to İzmir. As a chess player, he took part in the 17th, 18th, 25th, 26th and 27th Chess Olympiad Turkish National Team. He won the 1974, 1975 and 1982 Turkish Chess Championships.

While he was still alive, the International İlhan Onat Chess Tournament was organized in his memory in 2012 for his contributions to Turkish Chess Sport.

Onat died in 2013 in İzmir.

== Achievements ==
- 1974 Turkish Chess Championship – Champion
- 1975 Turkish Chess Championship – Champion
- 1982 Turkish Chess Championship – Champion
