= Gülümser Öney =

Turkish chess player (born 1956)

Personal information
- Born: 1956 (age 69–70) Pleven, Bulgaria

Chess career
- Country: Turkey
- Peak rating: 1789 (January 2010)

Gülümser Öney, originally Yılmaz (born 1956) is a Bulgarian-born Turkish female chess player. She is Turkey's most successful chess player being the eleven times national champion, including seven times consecutively from 1973.

== Chess career ==
Gülümser was born in Pleven, Bulgaria to Turkish parents. Her father, Lütfi Yılmaz, was a teacher and chess player from whom she learned to play chess. She became Bulgarian youth champion and captain of her high school's chess club. Gülümser taught her brother Turhan and sister Gülsevil chess while they were still in primary school.

The family moved to Turkey in 1972. With five years of chess experience, she took part the next year at a tournament for high school students organized by the Turkish daily Cumhuriyet in Istanbul. She completed the tournament unbeaten, which was attended by 186 youths including only six girls.

Following her graduation from high school, she attended Istanbul Technical University, where she earned a degree in chemical engineering.

Gülümser Yılmaz became engaged to chess player Sait Rıza Öney on September 8, 1984, and the couple later married.

Her brother Turhan later became Turkish Youth champion and then five times national champion between 1978 and 2004. Her sister Gülsevil also became Turkish Women's champion, in 1983.

== Achievements ==
Turkish Chess Championship

- 1973-1979 (seven times), 1981-1982 (twice), 1984 and 1986 - champion

Women's Chess Balkaniadas (team)

- 1978 - 4th
- 1979 - 5th
- 1981 - 4th
- 1982 - 5th
