= Burak Fırat =

Turkish chess grandmaster (born 1993)

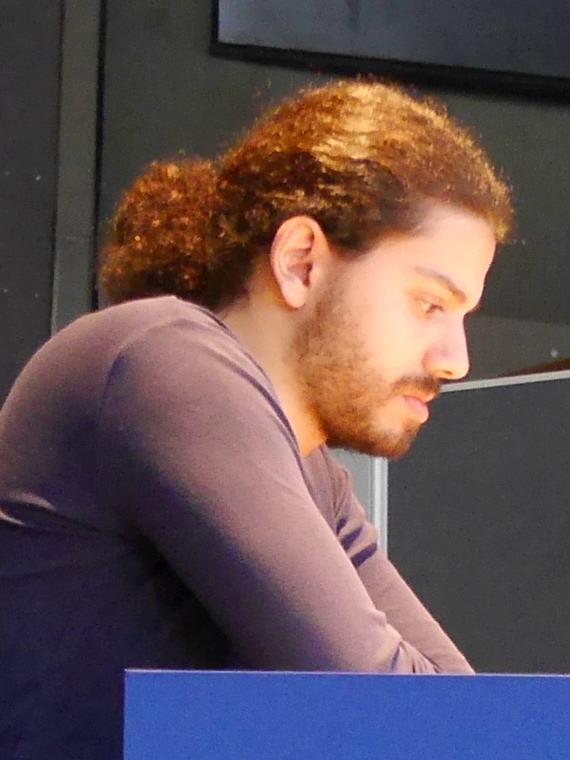
- Fırat in 2018

Personal information
- Born: 1 January 1993 (age 33) Barcelona, Spain

Chess career
- Country: Turkey
- Title: Grandmaster (2017)
- FIDE rating: 2442 (July 2026)
- Peak rating: 2503 (March 2017)

Burak Fırat (born 1 January 1993 in Barcelona) is a Turkish chess player who received the FIDE title of Grandmaster (GM) in 2017. Fırat is the eleventh player to become a grandmaster in Turkish chess history. He previously received the FIDE Master (FM) title in 2009 and International Master (IM) in 2010.
