= Jakob Vang Glud =

Danish chess grandmaster (born 1988)

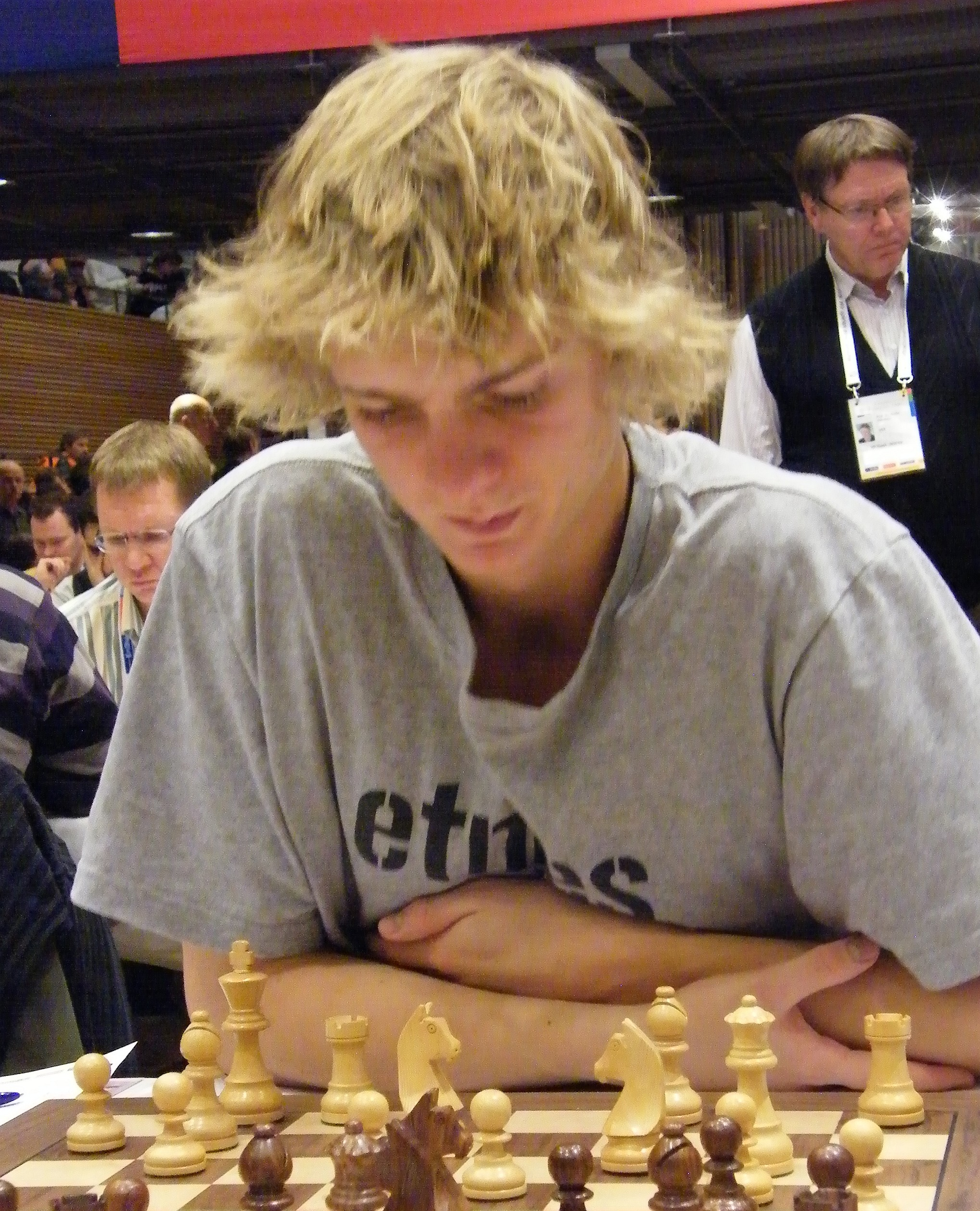
- Jakob Vang Glud in 2008

Personal information
- Born: 6 April 1988 (age 38) Aarhus, Denmark

Chess career
- Country: Denmark
- Title: Grandmaster (2014)
- FIDE rating: 2513 (November 2026)
- Peak rating: 2551 (March 2019)

Jakob Vang Glud (born 6 April 1988) is a Danish chess grandmaster. He was awarded the International Master title by FIDE in 2006 and became a Grandmaster in 2014 at the age of 26.

== Career ==
Glud has represented Denmark at six Chess Olympiads from 2008 to 2018. At the 43rd Chess Olympiad in Batumi in 2018, playing on board one for Denmark, he went undefeated and scored 7/9 (a 2743 performance rating). He also competed for the Danish national team in three European Team Chess Championships between 2009 and 2013.

In domestic club competitions, Glud won the Danish Team Championship (Skakligaen) five times: with Helsinge Skakklub in 2008–09, Jetsmark Skakklub in 2010–11 and 2011–12, and Philidor in 2015–16 and 2016–17. He has also played for Skolernes Skakklub and Århus Skakklub/Skolerne. In international club leagues, he played for CE Binissalem in the Spanish top division (División de Honor) during the 2008 season, for Eksjö SK in the Swedish Elitserien in 2016–17, and for SG Turm Kiel in the German Chess Bundesliga starting in the 2018–19 season.
