= Kübra Öztürk =

Turkish chess player (born 1991)

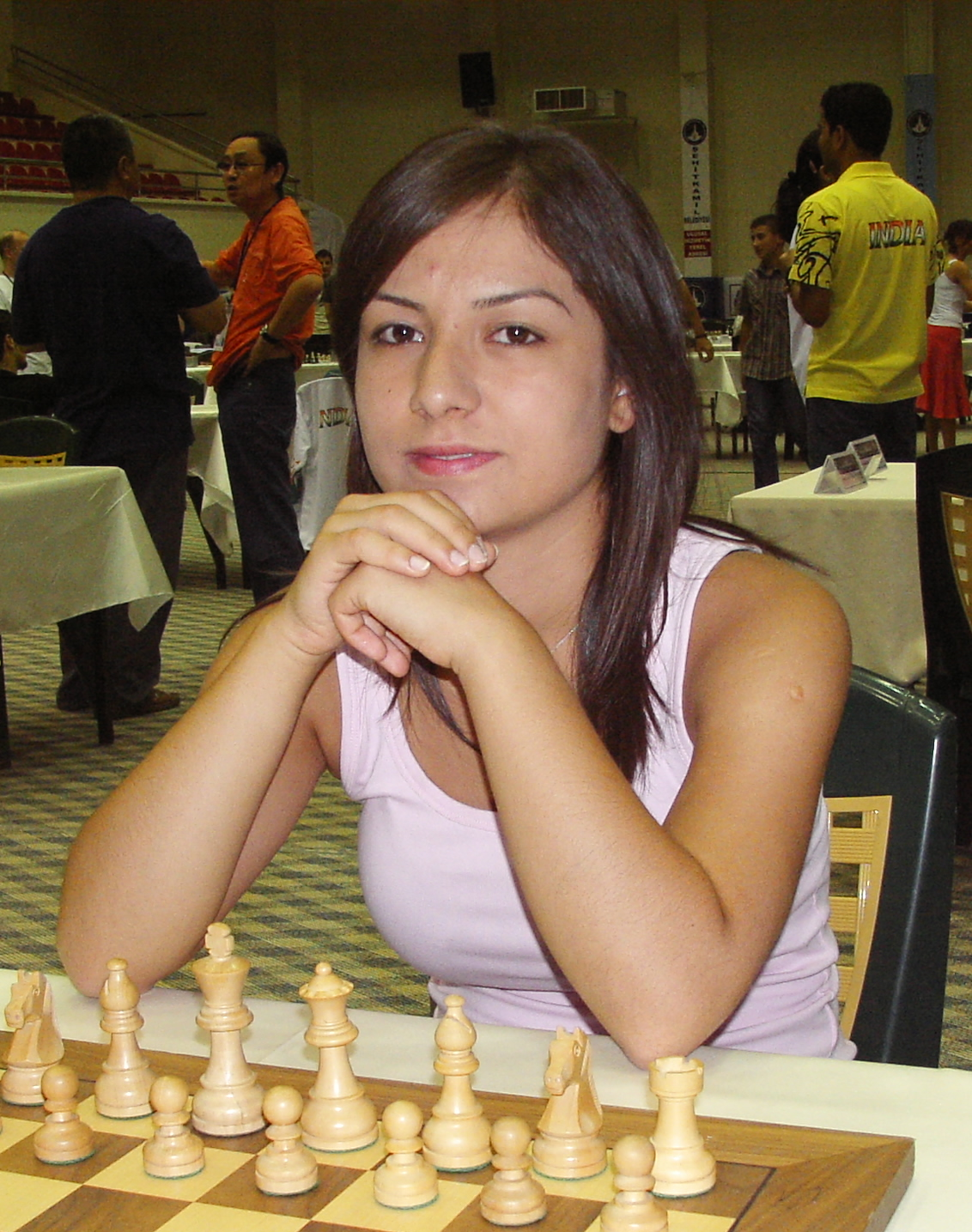
- Öztürk at the 2008 World Junior Chess Championship in Gaziantep, Turkey

Personal information
- Born: May 11, 1991 (age 35) Mamak, Ankara, Turkey

Chess career
- Country: Turkey
- Title: Woman Grandmaster (2012)
- Peak rating: 2364 (September 2017)

Kübra Öztürk (born May 11, 1991) is a Turkish chess player. As of the July 2012 FIDE rating list, she is ranked number 199 in the world and second in Turkey among female active players. She earned FIDE titles as Woman FIDE Master (WFM) in 2006, Woman International Master (WIM) in 2009 and Woman Grandmaster (WGM) on February 5, 2011.

She was born in 1991 in a low-income family to Durak Öztürk, a worker in a garment workshop, and his wife Gülizar as the third child. She has a sister and a brother. She grew up in a one-room shanty in the slums of Mamak, Ankara with her parents and paralytic grandfather.

Already in the second class of the primary school and eight years old in 1998, she attended a chess course in her neighborhood. Only eight months after her begin, her chess instructor İslam Osmanoğlu took Kübra to the World Youth Chess Championship held in Oropesa del Mar, Spain, where she placed 44th in her age category. At the age of nine, she placed third in the under-10 category of national championship. She won the Turkish champion title six times after 1999. In 2006 and 2007, Kübra Öztürk became European champion. At the World Championship held in Kemer, Antalya, Turkey in November 2007, she placed fourth at the U-16 girls category even though she gathered the same points with the winner.

After the 2006 Chess Olympiad in Italy, she was awarded the title Woman FIDE Master (WFM). Kübra Öztürk was named Woman Grandmaster after her success at the World Women's Chess Club Championship held in Mardin, Turkey as the second WGM following Betül Cemre Yıldız.

Meanwhile, she helped finance her brother Mehmet's education, who studied Physic at Süleyman Demirel University in Isparta, with her income from chess.

She won the Turkish Chess Championship women's title in Kemer, Antalya on January 29- February, 2012 defeating title-defender Betül Cemre Yıldız in the final game.

She played board three for Turkey in the women's chess olympiad in Baku in 2016 scoring +4 =4 -3.

== Achievements ==
Turkish Chess Championship (women's section)

- 2012 – champion
