= Turkish Chess Championship =

National chess competition

Following are the official winners of the national Turkish Chess Championships from 1962 to date.

== Winners ==
Year	Winner	Women's winner
1962	Nevzat Süer	
1963	Nevzat Süer	
1964	Nevzat Süer	
1965	Nevzat Süer	
1966	Siracettin Bilyap	
1967	İsmet İbrahimoğlu	
1968	Nevzat Süer	
1969	Nevzat Süer	
1970	İsmet İbrahimoğlu	
1971	İsmet İbrahimoğlu	Muzaffer Onaran
1972	Ferit Boysan	Linda Çakır
1973	Nevzat Süer	Gülümser Yılmaz
1974	İlhan Onat	Gülümser Yılmaz
1975	İlhan Onat	Gülümser Yılmaz
1976	Feridun Öney	Gülümser Yılmaz
1977	Ergun Gümrükçüoğlu	Gülümser Yılmaz
1978	Turhan Yılmaz	Gülümser Yılmaz
1979	Turhan Yılmaz	Gülümser Yılmaz
1980	Ergun Gümrükçüoğlu	Joan Arbil
1981	Suat Soylu	Gülümser Yılmaz
1982	İlhan Onat	Gülümser Yılmaz
1983	Adnan Şendur	Gülsevil Yılmaz
1984	Can Yurtseven	Gülümser Yılmaz
1985	Ateş Ülker	Nimet Yardımcı
1986	Turhan Yılmaz	Gülümser Yılmaz
1987	Suat Atalık	Nilüfer Çinar Çorlulu
1988	Suat Atalık	Nilüfer Çinar Çorlulu
1989	Turhan Yılmaz	Nilüfer Çinar Çorlulu
1990	Cem Karadağ	Nilüfer Çinar Çorlulu
1991	Hakan Erdoğan	Nilüfer Çinar Çorlulu
1992	Hakan Han	Nilüfer Çinar Çorlulu
1993	Can Arduman	Sevinç Dalak
1994	Can Arduman	Fatmanur Öney
1995	Ali İpek	Fatmanur Öney
1996	Can Arduman	Emine Sanlı
1997	Can Arduman	Burcu Korkmaz
1998	Can Arduman	Emine Sanlı
1999	Umut Atakişi	Nilüfer Çinar Çorlulu
2000	Tamer Karatekin	Nilüfer Çinar Çorlulu
2001	Umut Atakişi	Nilüfer Çinar Çorlulu
2002	Can Arduman	Betül Cemre Yıldız
2003	Kıvanç Haznedaroğlu	Betül Cemre Yıldız
2004	Turhan Yılmaz	Betül Cemre Yıldız
2005	Umut Atakişi	Betül Cemre Yıldız
2006	Mikhail Gurevich	Betül Cemre Yıldız
2007	Suat Atalık	Zehra Topel
2008	Mikhail Gurevich	Ekaterina Atalik
2009	Mustafa Yılmaz	Betül Cemre Yıldız
2010	Oğulcan Kanmazalp	Betül Cemre Yıldız
2011	Emre Can	Betül Cemre Yıldız
2012	Dragan Šolak	Kübra Öztürk
2013	Dragan Šolak	Betül Cemre Yıldız
2014	Alexander Ipatov	Betül Cemre Yıldız
2015	Alexander Ipatov	Betül Cemre Yıldız
2016	Mert Erdoğdu	Ekaterina Atalik
2017	Mustafa Yılmaz	Betül Cemre Yıldız
2018	Cemil Gülbaş	Ekaterina Atalik
2019	Vahap Şanal	Betül Cemre Yıldız Kadioglu
2020	Vahap Şanal	Ekaterina Atalik
2021	Mert Yılmazyerli	Ekaterina Atalık
2022	Mustafa Yılmaz	Ekaterina Atalık
2023	Mert Yılmazyerli	Ceren Tırpan
2024	Vahap Şanal	Elif Zeren Yıldız
2025	Işık Can	Ekaterina Atalık
2026	TBD	Ekaterina Atalık
