= Betül Cemre Yıldız =

Turkish chess player (born 1989)

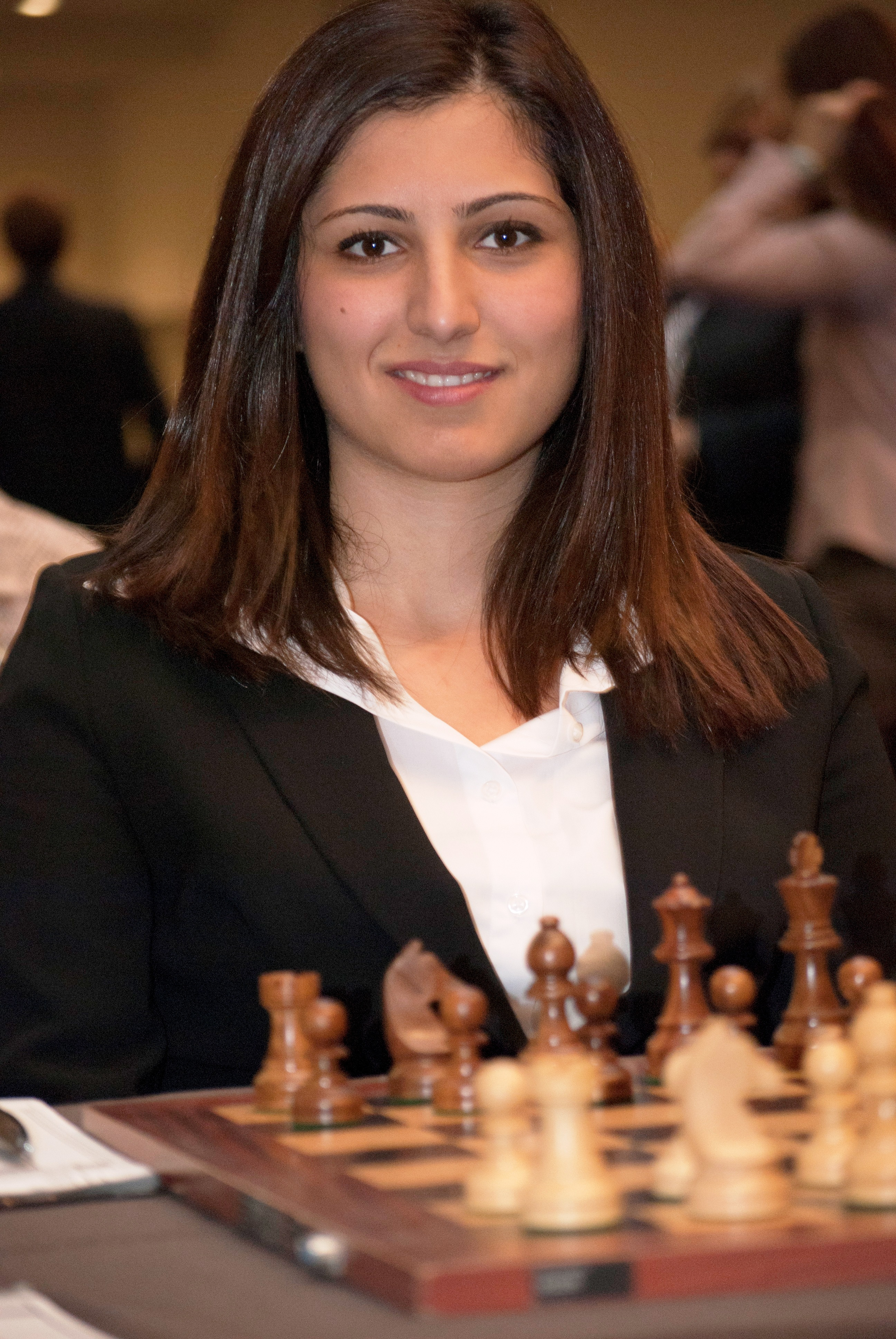
- Yıldız in 2011

Personal information
- Born: Betül Cemre Yıldız Kadıoğlu; 16 May 1989 (age 37) Adapazarı, Turkey

Chess career
- Country: Turkey
- Title: Woman Grandmaster (2012)
- Peak rating: 2379 (October 2012)

Betül Cemre Yıldız Kadıoğlu (born 16 May 1989) is a top female chess player from Turkey. She is a Woman Grandmaster (WGM), and won the Turkish women's championship eleven times in total. She became in 2004 Woman International Master (WIM), and was awarded the title Woman Grandmaster in 2012, becoming the first ever Turkish WGM. Yıldız won the bronze medal at the World Under-18 Girls Championship of 2007 and at the World Junior Girls Championship of 2009.

== Biography ==
Yıldız was born on May 16, 1989, in Adapazarı. She began chess playing at the age of nine, interested while watching her older brothers playing with her father. However, the ambitious girl was ignored by her brothers. So, she attended the chess course at her school without letting her family know about it. Her father was against her participation at tournaments. She, however, took part at her first tournament and won all the seven games and became İzmir champion at her age group.

She represented her country two years later at the Chess Olympiad. In 2003, Yıldız became an FIDE master and the next year WIM.

Yıldız studied law at the Dokuz Eylül University in İzmir and economics at the Anadolu University in Eskişehir by distance education. After completing her studies, she started a lawyer profession.

Currently, she is also engaged in teaching chess to children at a center named after her in Balçova, İzmir.

== Achievements ==
Turkish Chess Championship (women's section)

- 2002, 2003, 2004, 2005, 2006, 2009, 2010, 2011, 2013, 2014, 2015, 2017, 2019 – champion
- 2007 World Youth Chess Championship U18 Girls - Bronze Medal
- 2009 World Junior Chess Championship U20 Girls - Bronze Medal (shared 1st place)
- 2012 Istanbul Chess Olympiad 2nd Board - Bronze Medal

Turkish draughts

- 2016 1st Women's World Championship Turkish Draughts - Bronze Medal
