= U.S. Masters Chess Championship =

National chess contest

The U.S. Masters Championship is an official national chess championship sanctioned by US Chess that has been held 29 times since 1982. The event is a Swiss tournament usually restricted to players who have established peak ratings over 2200, plus high rated junior players, at the discretion of the organizer. As a primarily masters-only event, the U.S. Masters is one of the strongest Swiss tournaments in the U.S., offering FIDE title norms and large cash prizes to participants. Throughout its history, the event has always placed a premium on inviting foreign titled players to compete against American masters. The U.S. Masters has been dubbed "The Annual Homecoming of the American Master," and has previously been a qualifying tournament to the U.S. Championship.

== History ==
The tournament was originally called the Midwest Masters Invitational, organized by Helen and James Warren in the Chicago area. In 1990, the event was renamed to the U.S. Masters & Midwest Masters. The event skipped several editions in the 1990s and 2000s. Since 2009, the event has been called the U.S. Masters Chess Championship, and has been held in various cities in North Carolina: Hendersonville, Greensboro, and Charlotte. The U.S. Masters has been held consecutively since 2012, with the exception of 2020 due to the COVID-19 pandemic.

The current format is an annual 9-round Swiss tournament in one section, with FIDE title norms available. The event is open to players with the US Chess title of National Master, the FIDE titles of FIDE Master or Woman FIDE Master and higher, and highly-rated juniors (as defined by the organizer and/or US Chess).

Historically, the U.S. Masters has been held alongside separate open events such as the U.S. Open, North Carolina Sub-Masters, and the North Carolina Open, as well as side events such as scholastic tournaments, blitz chess tournaments, and other chess festival events.

In recent years, the U.S. Masters draws 200+ players, and more GMs and IMs than any other event in the US.

Many top U.S. players have competed in the U.S. Masters, and have earned title norms in the event. Eleven former U.S. Champions have competed in the U.S. Masters - Joel Benjamin, Nick De Firmian, Gata Kamsky, Alexander Shabalov, Alex Yermolinsky, Boris Gulko, Alexander Ivanov, Alexander Onischuk, Yury Shulman, Sam Shankland, and Fabiano Caruana. Six former U.S. Women's Champions have competed in the U.S. Masters - Irina Krush, Camilla Baginskaite, Nazi Paikidze, Sabina-Francesca Foisor, Jennifer Yu, and Carissa Yip.

== Winners ==
All players finishing equal first are listed; the official champions after playoffs, if held, are in bold.

No.	Year	Players	City	Champion
1	1982	36	Oak Brook, IL	(United States) Leonid Bass, (United States) FM Michael Brooks, (United States) Leonid Kaushansky
2	1984	43	Oak Brook, IL	(United States) FM Michael Brooks, (United States) FM Leonid Kaushansky, (Japan) Paul Kuroda
3	1985	56	Oak Brook, IL	(Canada) IM Igor Ivanov, (United States) IM Vincent McCambridge, (United States) Bruce Leverett
4	1986	76	Oak Brook, IL	(Israel) GM Yehuda Grunfeld, (United States) IM Sergey Kudrin, (United States) IM Joel Benjamin
5	1987	85	Oak Brook, IL	(United States) GM Sergey Kudrin, (United States) GM Joel Benjamin, (United States) GM Leonid Shamkovich
6	1988	77	Oak Brook, IL	(United States) IM Victor Frias Pablaza
7	1989	72	Oak Brook, IL	(United States) IM Michael Brooks
8	1990	118	Oak Brook, IL	(England) GM Tony Miles
9	1996	79	Oak Brook, IL	(United States) GM Dmitry Gurevich
10	1997	130	Oak Brook, IL	(United States) GM Dmitry Gurevich, (United States) GM Alexander Shabalov, (Turkey) GM Suat Atalik
11	1998	75	Waikiki, HI	(United States) GM Boris Gulko
12	2000	105	Oak Brook, IL	(Estonia) GM Jaan Ehlvest, (Poland) GM Aleksander Wojtkiewicz, (United States) GM Nick De Firmian, (Republic of Ireland) GM Alexander Baburin, (United States) GM Alexander Shabalov, (Czech Republic) GM Pavel Blatny, (United States) GM Raset Ziatdinov
13	2002	101	Oak Brook, IL	(Ukraine) GM Alexander Onischuk, (United States) GM Gregory Kaidanov, (Israel) GM Leonid Yudasin, (United States) GM Aleksander Wojtkiewicz, (Germany) GM Daniel Fridman
14	2006	46	Hendersonville, NC	(Georgia (country)) IM Giorgi Margvelashvili, (Russia) Andrey Chumachenko, (United States) Bryan Smith, (United States) IM Ronald Burnett, (United States) Daniel Ludwig
15	2007	45	Hendersonville, NC	(United States) GM Jaan Ehlvest
16	2010	27	Hendersonville, NC	(United States) Craig Jones
17	2012	57	Greensboro, NC	(Georgia (country)) GM Giorgi Margvelashvili
18	2013	79	Greensboro, NC	(Azerbaijan) GM Rauf Mamedov
19	2014	82	Greensboro, NC	(Poland) GM Bartlomiej Macieja
20	2015	88	Greensboro, NC	(United States) GM Yaroslav Zherebukh, (Lithuania) GM Aloyzas Kveinys
21	2016	88	Greensboro, NC	(Russia) GM Andrey Stukopin
22	2017	81	Greensboro, NC	(Russia) GM Vladimir Belous
23	2018	88	Greensboro, NC	(United States) **GM John Michael Burke**, (United States) GM Jeffery Xiong, (Israel) GM Evgeny Postny, (Armenia) GM Hovhannes Gabuzyan, (United States) GM Timur Gareyev, (United States) GM Sergey Erenburg, (Cuba) GM Yuri Gonzalez Vidal, (Uzbekistan) IM Djurabek Khamrakulov
24	2019	88	Greensboro, NC	(Cuba) **GM Isan Reynaldo Ortiz Suárez**, (Cuba) GM Lazaro Bruzon Batista, (Armenia) GM Hovhannes Gabuzyan, (United States) GM Daniel Naroditsky, (Belarus) GM Sergei Azarov, (United States) GM Elshan Moradiabadi, (United States) GM Steven Zierk, (Poland) GM Bartlomiej Macieja, (United States) IM Praveen Balakrishnan
25	2021	151	Charlotte, NC	(Peru) **GM José Eduardo Martínez Alcántara**, (India) IM Rahul Srivatshav Peddi
26	2022	202	Charlotte, NC	(United States) **GM Christopher Yoo**, (United States) GM Alejandro Ramirez, GM Mikhail Antipov, (Peru) GM Emilio Cordova, (Peru) GM Cristhian Cruz Sánchez
27	2023	202	Charlotte, NC	(FIDE) **GM Mikhail Antipov**, (Hungary) IM Gleb Dudin, (United States) IM Justin Wang, (United States) IM Bryce Tiglon
28	2024	264	Charlotte, NC	(United States) GM Fabiano Caruana
29	2025	251	Charlotte, NC	(United States) **GM Awonder Liang**, (United States) GM Andrew Hong
30	2026		Charlotte, NC	

Twelve players have won the event multiple times (including ties for first place): Michael Brooks (3), Leonid Kaushansky (2), Joel Benjamin (2), Sergey Kudrin (2), Dmitry Gurevich (2), Alexander Shabalov (2), Jaan Ehlvest (2), Aleksander Wojtkiewicz (2), Giorgi Margvelashvili (2), Bartlomiej Macieja (2), Hovhannes Gabuzyan (2), and Mikhail Antipov (2).

== Details by Year ==
1982 – Chicago, IL, December 3–5. The first edition of the event was called the Midwest Masters Invitational. 36 players played a 5-round, 3-day event, organized at the Palmer House at the University of Chicago by Chief Organizer Helen Warren. The top seed was Leonid Bass (2405 FIDE). 3 players tied for first place with 4.0/5: Leonid Bass, Michael Brooks, and Leonid Kaushansky.

1983 – Event not held

1984 – Chicago, IL, March 9–11. The Midwest Masters Invitational II was organized at the University of Chicago by Chief Organizer Helen Warren. 43 players played a 5-round, 3-day event. The top seed was IM Steven Odendahl (2380 FIDE). This was the first time that an International Master competed in the event. 3 players tied for first place with 4.0/5: FM Michael Brooks, FM Leonid Kaushansky, and Paul Kuroda.

1985 – Chicago, IL, March 8–10. The Midwest Masters Invitational III was organized at the International house at the University of Chicago by Chief Organizer Helen Warren. The event was open to GMs, IMs, and Senior Masters, plus players rated over 2300 from Midwest states, players rated over 2200 from Illinois, and other players by invitation. The guaranteed prize fund was $2,600, including $1,200 for first place. 56 players played a 5-round, 3-day event, with a time control of 40 moves in 150 minutes. The top seeds was IM Igor Ivanov (2465 FIDE). 3 players tied for first place with 4.5/5: IM Igor Ivanov, IM Vincent McCambridge, and Bruce Leverett, earning $783 each.

1986 – Chicago, IL, March 7–9. The Midwest Masters Invitational IV was organized at the Lincolnwood Hyatt in Chicago by Chief Organizer Helen Warren. 76 players played 5 FIDE-rated rounds over 3 days, with a time control of 40 moves in 2 hours, followed by 20 moves per hour. The event was open to players who have ever been rated 2200+. The guaranteed prize fund was increased to $3,000, including $1,400 for first place. This was the first US Masters in which Grandmasters played - 6 GMs and 6 IMs entered, including the top seed IM Joel Benjamin, (2555 FIDE). 3 players tied for first place with 4.5/5: GM Yehuda Gruenfeld, IM Sergey Kudrin, and IM Joel Benjamin, earning $900 each.

1987 – Chicago, IL, March 6–8. The Midwest Masters Invitational V was organized at the Lincolnwood Hyatt in Chicago by Chief Organizer Helen Warren. 85 players played 5 FIDE-rated rounds over 3 days, with a time control of 40 moves in 2 hours, followed by 20 moves per hour. The event was open to players who have ever been rated 2200+. The guaranteed prize fund was increased to $4250, including $2,000 for first place. The top seed was GM Joel Benjamin, (2565 FIDE), ranked #34 in the World and #4 in the US. 3 players tied for first place with 4.5/5: GM Sergey Kudrin, GM Joel Benjamin, and GM Leonid Shamkovich, earning $1200 each.

1988 – Chicago, IL, March 7–9. The Midwest Masters Invitational VI was organized at the Lincolnwood Hyatt by Chief Organizer Helen Warren. The event was open to players who have ever been rated 2200+. The guaranteed prize fund was $4,250, including $2,000 for first place. This was the first year where the number of rounds was increased to 6 FIDE-rated rounds over 3 days, with a time control of 40 moves in 2 hours, followed by 20 moves per hour. 77 players entered, including top seed IM Victor Frias Pablaza (2485 FIDE). IM Victor Frias Pablaza won the event with 5.5/6, earning a $2,000 prize.

1989 – Chicago, IL, March 3–5. The Midwest Masters Invitational VII was organized at the Lincolnwood Hyatt by Chief Organizer Helen Warren, and dubbed "The Annual Homecoming of the American Master." 72 players competed in 6 FIDE-rated rounds over 3 days, with a time control of 40 moves in 2 hours, then 20 moves per hour. The event was limited to players who have ever been rated 2200+, plus juniors under 2200 by invitation. The prize fund was increased to $5,500 guaranteed, including $2,500 for first place. The top seed was GM Maxim Dlugy (2570 FIDE), ranked #46 in the World. IM Michael Brooks won the tournament with 5.5/6, earning a $2500 prize.

1990 – Oak Brook, IL, March 15–18. The event was renamed to the U.S. Masters & Midwest Masters, and was considered an official US Chess national event for the first time. The 1990 edition was organized by Chief Organizer Helen Warren at the Hyatt Regency Oak Brook Hotel. The event expanded to 7 FIDE-rated rounds over 4 days for the first time, with a time control of 40 moves in 2 hours, then 20 moves in 1 hour, then sudden death in 1 hour. The event had a then-record attendance of 118 players, and was open to players who have ever been rated 2200+, plus 6 invited juniors. The guaranteed prize fund saw a massive increase to $15,750, including $5,000 for first place and $5,000 in "regional prizes," distributed among high scorers who traveled from around the US. The top seed was GM Anthony Miles (2580 FIDE), ranked #38 in the World. Miles won the tournament 6.5/7, earning a $5000 prize.

1991-1995 – Event not held

1996 – Oak Brook, IL, March 7–10. After a 6 year hiatus, the U.S. Masters & Midwest Masters returned, organized by Chief Organizer Helen Warren. 79 players played 7 FIDE-rated rounds in 4 days, with a time control of 40 moves in 2 hours, then 20 moves in 1 hour, then sudden death in 30 minutes. The guaranteed prize fund was increased to $16,000, including $5,000 for first place. The event was open to players who have ever been rated 2200+, plus 6 invited juniors. The top seed was GM Artur Jussupow (2655 FIDE), ranked #18 in the World. This was the first time that a 2650+ FIDE-rated player competed in the event. GM Dmitry Gurevich earned the only perfect score in U.S. Masters history with 7.0/7, winning $5,000. 4 players tied for second place with 5.5/7: GM Artur Jussupow, GM Alex Yermolinsky, GM Walter Browne, and IM Boris Kreiman, earning $1700 each.

1997 – Oak Brook, IL, March 6–9. The 1997 edition of the U.S. Masters & Midwest Masters was organized at the Hyatt Regency Oak Brook by Chief Organizer Helen Warren. This was the tenth and final edition of the Midwest Masters. 4 players - Eugene Martinovsky, Erik Karklins, Albert Chow, and Kenneth Wallach, played in all 10 Midwest Masters tournaments from 1982-1997. 130 players (an attendance record at the time) played 7 FIDE-rated rounds over 4 days, with a time control of 40 moves in 2 hours, followed by 20 moves in 1 hour, then sudden death in 30 minutes. The guaranteed prize fund was increased to $17400, including $5,000 for first place. The event was open to players who have ever been rated 2200+, plus 6 invited juniors. The top seed was GM Lembit Oll (2625 FIDE), ranked #42 in the World. 3 players tied for first place with 6.0/7: GM Dmitry Gurevich, GM Alexander Shabalov, and GM Suat Atalik, earning $3333 each.

1998 – Waikiki, HI, July 21–29. The event moved to Hawaii for the first and only time, and was organized by Larry Reifurth, President of the Hawaii Chess Federation, and Eric Schiller of Chessworks Unlimited, at the Hawaiian Monarch Hotel in Waikiki. The event was sponsored by Saitek, and was called the 1998 Saitek U.S. Masters. It was part of the Hawaii International Chess Festival, and held just prior to the 1998 U.S. Open Chess Championship. The event moved to a 9-round schedule over 9 days, offering title norms for the first time. The FIDE-rated time control was 40 moves in 2 hours, followed by 20 moves in 1 hour, then sudden death in 30 minutes. 75 players entered. The guaranteed prize fund was $15,000, including $5,000 for first place. The event was open to players who have ever been rated 2200+, plus 6 invited juniors. The top seed was GM Joel Benjamin (2595 FIDE). GM Boris Gulko earned clear first place with 7.5/9, earning a $5,000 prize, while GM Ian Rogers earned clear second place with 7.0/9, earning a $2,500 prize.

1999 – Event not held

2000 – Oak Brook, IL, March 9–12. After a year's hiatus, the event returned to Illinois as the 2000 U.S. Masters, and was organized by Chief Organizer Helen Warren at the Hyatt Regency Oak Brook Hotel. The event reverted back to 7 FIDE-rated rounds over 4 days, with a time control of 40 moves in 2 hours, followed by 20 moves in 1 hour, then sudden death in 30 minutes. 105 players entered. The guaranteed prize fund was increased to the then-record of $17,500, including $5,000 for first place. The event was open to players who have ever been rated 2200+, plus invited juniors rated 2000+. The event featured 18 GMs and 6 IMs from 7 foreign countries and 25 states. The top seed was GM Jaan Ehlvest (2622 FIDE). 7 players tied for first place with 5.5/7: GMs Jaan Ehlvest, Aleksander Wojtkiewicz, Nick De Firmian, Alexander Baburin, Alexander Shabalov, Pavel Blatny, and Raset Ziatdinov, earning $1,886 each.

2001 – Event not held

2002 – Oak Brook, IL, February 28 - March 3. After another year's hiatus, the 2002 U.S. Masters returned to Illinois for the final time. It was sponsored in a major way by Dr. Eugene Martinovsky, who died a few weeks before the event, but left a major request to the U.S. Masters. As such, the event was named the Dr. Eugene Martinovsky Memorial Masters, and had a massively increased $22,000 guaranteed prize fund (then the record), including $6,000 for first place (another record). It was organized by Chief Organizer Helen Warren at the Hyatt Regency Oak Brook Hotel. The event was open to players who have ever been rated 2200+, plus invited juniors rated 2000+. It was also a qualifier for the 2002 U.S. Championship. 101 players played 7 FIDE-rated rounds over 4 days, with a time control of 40 moves in 2 hours, then sudden death in 1 hour. The top seed was GM Alexander Onischuk (2655 FIDE). 5 players tied for first place with 5.5/7: GMs Alexander Onischuk, Gregory Kaidanov, Leonid Yudasin, Aleksander Wojtkiewicz, and Daniel Fridman, earning $3000 each.

2003-2005 – Event not held

2006 – Hendersonville, NC, March 11–19. After a 4-year hiatus, the event moved to North Carolina for the first time. It was organized by the Henderson County Chess Club and Chief Organizer Kevin Hyde at the Quality Inn & Suites Hotel in Hendersonville, NC. It was open to players who have been rated 2200+, foreign FIDE-rated players, and juniors rated 2000+. It was held alongside the N.C. Sub-Masters for those with lower ratings. There were 9 FIDE-rated rounds over 9 days, with a FIDE-rated time control of Game in 150 minutes. 46 players entered. The guaranteed prize fund was $5,000, including $1,600 for first place. The top seed was IM Giorgi Margvelashvili (2434 FIDE). 5 players tied for first place with 6.5/9: IM Giorgi Margvelashvili, FM Andrey Chumachenko, Bryan Smith, IM Ronald Burnett, and FM Daniel Ludwig, earning $700 each.

2007 – Hendersonville, NC, March 10–18. The 2007 U.S. Masters Championship was organized by the Henderson County Chess Club and Chief Organizer Kevin Hyde at the Quality Inn & Suites Hotel in Hendersonville, NC. It was open to players who have been rated 2200+, foreign FIDE-rated players, and juniors rated 2000+. It was held alongside the N.C. Sub-Masters for those with lower ratings. 45 players entered. There were 9 FIDE-rated rounds over 9 days, with a FIDE-rated time control of Game in 150 minutes. IM norms were available. The guaranteed prize fund was $5,000, including $1,600 for first place. 41 players played a 9-round, 9-day event. The top seed, GM Jaan Ehlvest (2610 FIDE) won the event with 7.5/9, earning $1600. 3 players tied for second place: Faik Aleskerov, Bryan Smith, and Kazim Gulamali, earning $517 each.

2008-2009 – Event not held

2010 – Hendersonville, NC, March 13–21. After a 2-year hiatus, the 2010 U.S. Masters Championship was organized by the Henderson County Chess Club and Chief Organizer Kevin Hyde at the Quality Inn & Suites Hotel in Hendersonville, NC. It was open to players who have been rated 2200+, foreign FIDE-rated players, and juniors rated 2000+. It was held alongside the N.C. Sub-Masters for those with lower ratings. There were 9 FIDE-rated rounds over 9 days, with a FIDE-rated time control of Game in 150 minutes. IM norms were available. This was the only time in history that the prize fund was not fully guaranteed - the organizers projected a $5000 prize fund based on 50 fully paid entries, including $1500 projected for first place. Event attendance fell to 27 players, the lowest attendance in event history. It was a 9-round, 9-day event. The top seed was IM Ronald Burnett (2366 FIDE). North Carolinian National Master Craig Jones won the event with 7.0/9, earning $750, with Tennessee's FM Peter Bereolos coming in second place, earning $450.

2011 – Event not held

2012 – Greensboro, NC, August 30 - September 3. Under the efforts and patronage of the Carolinas Chess Initiative, High Point University, and organizers Dr. Walter High and Gary Newsom, the event moved to the Embassy Suites Airport Hotel in Greensboro, NC over Labor Day Weekend, alongside the North Carolina Open. 57 players in the a 9-round, 5-day event, with GM/IM norms available, and a FIDE-rated time control of 40 moves in 90 minutes, then sudden death in 30 minutes, with a 30 second increment from move 1. It was open to players who have been rated 2200+, foreign FIDE-rated players, and juniors (under 21) rated 2000+. The prize fund was $17,000, including $5,000 for first place. The top seed was GM Sergei Azarov (2642 FIDE). GM Giorgi Margvelashvili won clear first place with 7.0/9, earning a $5,000 prize.

2013 – Greensboro, NC, August 29 - September 2. The 2013 U.S. Masters was organized by the Carolinas Chess Initiative and Chief Organizer Dr. Walter High. It had the same location and eligibility requirements as the 2012 event, and was held alongside the North Carolina Open. 79 players played in the 9-round, 5-day norm event. The prize fund was $17,000, with $5,000 for first place. The top seed was GM Rauf Mamedov (2641 FIDE). Mamedov won clear first place with 7.0/9, earning a $5,000 prize. 4 players tied for second place: GM Alejandro Ramirez, GM Georg Meier, GM Bartlomiej Macieja, and IM Justin Sarkar, earning $1875 each. IM Justin Sarkar earned a GM norm, while FM Alex Ostrovskiy, WGM Tatev Abrahamyan, FM Bradley Denton, Damir Studen, and Denys Shmelov earned IM norms. WFM Sabrina Chevannes earned a WGM and WIM norm, and WFM Sarah Chiang earned a WIM norm.

2014 – Greensboro, NC, August 28 - September 1. The 2014 U.S. Masters was organized by the Carolinas Chess Initiative and Chief Organizer Dr. Walter High. It had the same location and eligibility requirements as the 2013 event, and was held alongside the North Carolina Open. 82 players played in the 9-round, 5-day norm event. The prize fund was $17,000, with $5,000 for first place. The top seed was GM Illya Nyzhnyk (2639 FIDE). GM Bartlomiej Macieja won clear first place with 7.5/9, earning a $5,000 prize. GM Yaroslav Zherebukh earned second place with 7.0/9, earning $3,000. FM Razvan Preotu, David Hua, FM Kesav Viswanadha, and Michael Corallo earned IM norms.

2015 – Greensboro, NC, August 27–31. The 2015 U.S. Masters was organized by the Carolinas Chess Initiative and Chief Organizer Dr. Walter High. It had the same location and eligibility requirements as the 2014 event, and was held alongside the North Carolina Open. 88 players played in the 9-round, 5-day norm event. This was the first year that the event was a "super swiss" norm event, making it easier for players to achieve norms by bypassing the traditional federation requirement. The prize fund was $17,000, with $5,000 for first place. The top seed was GM Gata Kamsky (2670 FIDE). GM Yaroslav Zherebukh and GM Aloyzas Kveinys tied for first place, earning $4000 each. GM Yaroslav Zherebukh won the trophy and official title after winning an armageddon playoff against GM Aloyzas Kveinys. FM Nicolas Checa and FM Gauri Shankar earned IM norms, while Akshita Gorti earned her final WIM norm.

2016 – Greensboro, NC, August 25–29. The 2016 U.S. Masters was organized by the Carolinas Chess Initiative and Chief Organizer Dr. Walter High. It had the same location and eligibility requirements as the 2015 event, and was held alongside the North Carolina Open. 88 players played in the 9-round, 5-day super Swiss norm event. The prize fund was $17,000, with $5,000 for first place. The top seed was GM Aleksandr Shimanov (2639 FIDE). GM Andrey Stukopin earned clear first place with 7.0/9, earning a $5000 prize. 4 players tied for second place with 6.5/9: GM Yaroslav Zherebukh, GM Alejandro Ramirez, GM Yuniesky Quesada Perez, and GM Timur Gareyev, earning $1638 each. Apurva Virkud earned an IM, WGM, and WIM norm.

2017 – Greensboro, NC, August 23–27. The 2017 U.S. Masters was organized by the Carolinas Chess Initiative and Chief Organizer Dr. Walter High. It had the same location and eligibility requirements as the 2016 event, and was held alongside the North Carolina Open. 81 players played in the 9-round, 5-day super Swiss norm event. The prize fund was $17,000, with $5,000 for first place. The top seed was GM Sam Shankland (2671 FIDE), the highest-rated player to ever have played in the event until that point. GM Vladimir Belous earned clear first place with 7.0/9, earning a $5,000 prize. 3 players tied for second place with 6.5/9: GM Sam Shankland, GM Yaroslav Zherebukh, and IM Dmitry Gordievsky, earning $1967 each. FM Advait Patel earned his final IM norm.

2018 – Greensboro, NC, August 23–27. The 2018 U.S. Masters was organized by the Carolinas Chess Initiative and Chief Organizer Dr. Walter High. It had the same location and eligibility requirements as the 2017 event, and was held alongside the North Carolina Open. 88 players played in the 9-round, 5-day super Swiss norm event. The prize fund was increased to $27,000, with $7000 for first place, the largest prize fund and first place prize in event history. The top seed was GM Jeffery Xiong (2650 FIDE). 8 players tied for first place with 6.5/9: GM Jeffery Xiong, GM Evgeny Postny, GM Hovhannes Gabuzyan, GM Timur Gareyev, GM Sergey Erenburg, GM Yuri Gonzalez Vidal, GM John Michael Burke, and IM Djurabek Khamrakulov, earning $2,563 each. IM Djurabek Khamrakulov earned his final GM norm, while IM Hans Niemann earned a GM norm with one round to spare by playing 9 GMs. GM John Michael Burke won the trophy and official title after winning an armageddon playoff against GM Jeffery Xiong.

2019 – Greensboro, NC, August 21–25. The 2019 U.S. Masters was organized by the Carolinas Chess Initiative and Chief Organizer Dr. Walter High. It had the same location and eligibility requirements as the 2018 event, and was held alongside the North Carolina Open. 88 players played in the 9-round, 5-day super Swiss norm event, which was held in Greensboro for the final time. The prize fund was $27000, with $7,000 for first place, equaling the largest prize fund and first place prize up to that point. The top seed was GM Dariusz Swiercz (2670 FIDE). A logjam of 9 players tied for first place with 6.5/9, the largest tie in event history: GM Lazaro Bruzon Batista, GM Hovhannes Gabuzyan, GM Daniel Naroditsky, GM Isan Reynaldo Ortiz Suarez, GM Sergei Azarov, GM Elshan Moradiabadi, GM Steven Zierk, GM Bartlomiej Macieja, and IM Praveen Balakrishnan. 8 players tied for first place with 6.5/9: GM Jeffery Xiong, GM Evgeny Postny, GM Hovhannes Gabuzyan, GM Timur Gareyev, GM Sergey Erenburg, GM Yuri Gonzalez Vidal, GM John Michael Burke, and IM Djurabek Khamrakulov, earning $2,389 each. Isan Ortiz Suarez won the trophy and official title after winning an armageddon playoff against Sergei Azarov, while Elshan Moradiabadi earned the top American player designation after winning an armageddon playoff against Daniel Naroditsky. 5 players achieved norms: IM Praveen Balakrishnan earned his second GM norm, IM David Brodsky earned his final GM norm, FM Carissa Yip earned her 2nd IM norm, FM Kapil Chandran earned his first IM norm, and FM Olivier-Kenta Chiku-Ratte earned his final IM norm.

2020 – Event not held due to the COVID-19 pandemic

2021 – Charlotte, NC, November 24–28. The event moved to Charlotte, NC over Thanksgiving Weekend for the first time. It was organized at the Hilton Charlotte University Place Hotel and organized by the Charlotte Chess Center and Chief Organizer Dr. Walter High. It was organized alongside the 2021 North Carolina Open. The 2021 event attracted 151 players, an event record at the time. The 2021 edition was a 9-round, 5-day super Swiss norm event with a FIDE-rated time control of game in 100 minutes with a 30 second increment. The guaranteed prize fund was $17,000, including $5,000 for first place. The event was open to players who have ever been rated 2200+, plus players with FIDE titles of FM, WFM, or higher, plus juniors rated 2100+ USCF or 2000+ FIDE. 20 GMs and 31 IMs played. The top seed was GM Alex Lenderman (2624 FIDE). GM José Eduardo Martínez Alcántara and IM Rahul Srivatshav Peddi tied for first place with 7.0/9, earning $3,750 each. GM José Eduardo Martínez Alcántara won the trophy, official title, and a $500 bonus after winning a blitz playoff against IM Rahul Srivatshav Peddi by a score of 2–0. 5 players achieved norms: IM Rahul Srivatshav Peddi earned a GM norm, IM Christopher Yoo earned his final GM norm, FM Evan Park earned an IM norm, Deepak Aaron earned an IM norm, and Vishnu Vanapalli earned his first IM norm.

2022 – Charlotte, NC, November 23–27. The 2022 U.S. Masters returned to the Hilton Charlotte University Place Hotel under the organization of the Charlotte Chess Center and Chief Organizer Dr. Walter High. It was organized alongside the 2022 North Carolina Open. 202 players played in this 9-round, 5-day super Swiss, the current record attendance. The FIDE-rated time control was game in 90 minutes with a 30 second increment. The prize fund was increased from the previous year to $20,000, including $5,000 for first place and $2,000 in top female and senior prizes. The event was open to players who have ever been rated 2200+, plus players with FIDE titles of FM, WFM, or higher, plus juniors rated 2000+ USCF or FIDE. 30 GMs and 40 IMs played. The top seed was GM Grigoriy Oparin (2683 FIDE), the highest rated player to ever have played in the event. 5 players tied for first place with 7.0/9: GM Mikhail Antipov, GM Christopher Yoo, GM Emilio Cordova, GM Alejandro Ramirez, and GM Cristhian Cruz, earning $2,400 each. Christopher Yoo won the trophy, official title, and a $300 bonus after winning a blitz playoff against Alejandro Ramirez by a score of 2–0. WIM Sila Caglar won the top female prize of $600, while GM Alexander Fishbein, GM Alonso Zapata, and IM Roberto Martín del Campo won the top senior prize, earning $333 each. FM Anthony Atanasov earned an IM norm.

2023 – Charlotte, NC, November 22–26. The 2023 U.S. Masters returned to the Hilton Charlotte University Place Hotel under the organization of the Charlotte Chess Center and Chief Organizer Dr. Walter High. It was organized alongside the 2023 North Carolina Open. 202 players played in this 9-round, 5-day super Swiss offering title norms, tying the 2022 edition for the attendance record at the time. The time control was game in 90 minutes with a 30 second increment. The event was part of the 2023 FIDE Circuit. The prize fund was increased from the previous year to $22,000, including $6,000 for first place. The event increased in strength, as the organizers raised the junior rating exemption from 2000 to 2100. The event was open to players who have ever been rated 2200+, plus players with FIDE titles of FM, WFM, or higher, plus juniors rated 2100+ USCF or FIDE. 35 GMs and 40 IMs played - the combined 75 GM/IM attendance was a US Chess record for the most Grandmasters and International Masters to play in a classical event in the US. The top seed was GM Awonder Liang (2640 FIDE). 4 players tied for first place with 7.0/9: GM Mikhail Antipov, IM Gleb Dudin, IM Justin Wang, and IM Bryce Tiglon, earning $3125 each. Mikhail Antipov won the trophy, official title, and a $300 bonus after being the tiebreak winner, as Justin Wang, second on tiebreaks, was unavailable for the blitz playoff. IM Bryce Tiglon, IM Jason Wang, and FM Brewington Hardaway earned GM norms. FM Brewington Hardaway and FM Seth Homa earned IM norms. IM Brian Escalante crossed the 2500 FIDE threshold, which was his final requirement for the Grandmaster title. Brewington Hardaway crossed the 2400 FIDE threshold, which was his final requirement for the International Master title.

2024 – Charlotte, NC, November 27 - December 1. The 2024 U.S. Masters moved to a new venue, the Westin Charlotte, under the organization of the Charlotte Chess Center's Dr. Walter High and Peter Giannatos. It was held alongside the 2024 North Carolina Open. The event format is a 9-round, 5-day super Swiss offering title norms, with a FIDE-rated time control of game in 90 minutes with a 30 second increment. The event was part of the 2024 FIDE Circuit, and the $28,000 prize fund was the largest in event history, including $7,000 for first place and $4,200 in female and senior prizes. The event was open to players who have ever been rated 2200+, plus players with FIDE titles of FM, WFM, or higher, plus juniors rated 2100+ by US Chess or FIDE. 264 players played in this 9-round, 5-day super Swiss, breaking the attendance record. The top seed was World #2 GM Fabiano Caruana (2805 FIDE) - the first time that a 2700+ player played in the U.S. Masters. 47 GMs and 51 IMs played - the combined 98 GM/IM attendance was a US Chess record for the most Grandmasters and International Masters to play in a classical event in the US. GM Fabiano Caruana earned clear first place with 8.0/9, earning a $7,500 prize. This (8 points) was the highest score ever achieved in the U.S. Masters. In second place was GM Nikolas Theodorou, who earned $3,500 for his 7.5/9 score, including a win against Caruana in round 6. IM Gulrukhbegim Tokhirjonova won the top female prize of $1,600, while GM Alexander Fishbein and IM Oladapo Adu tied for the top Senior prize, earning $700 each. GM norms were earned by IM Isik Can, IM Mark Heimann, IM Evan Park, and IM Tianqi Wang. IM norms were earned by FM Avi Kaplan and Gunnar Andersen.

2025 – Charlotte, NC, November 26–30. The 2025 U.S. Masters was held at the Hilton Charlotte University Place Hotel, under the organization of the Charlotte Chess Center's Dr. Walter High and Peter Giannatos. It was held alongside the 2025 North Carolina Open. The format was a 9-round, 5-day super Swiss offering title norms, with a FIDE-rated time control of game in 90 minutes with a 30 second increment. The event was part of the 2025 FIDE Circuit. There was a $25,000 prize fund, including female and senior prizes. The 2025 U.S. Masters was open to players who have ever been rated 2200+, plus players with FIDE titles of FM, WFM, or higher, plus juniors rated 2000+ FIDE or 2100+ USCF. 251 players entered, including top seed GM Awonder Liang (2701 FIDE), signifying the second time that a 2700+ player played in the U.S. Masters. 38 GMs and 36 IMs played. GMs Awonder Liang and Andrew Hong tied for first place with 7.5/9, earning $5,250 each. They contested a blitz playoff, which Liang won 1.5-0.5, earning the US Masters trophy, title, and a $500 bonus. IM Carissa Yip won the top female prize of $600, while GM Alexander Shabalov won the top Senior prize, also earning $600. IM norms were earned by FM Avi Kaplan, FM Seth Homa, and NM Evan Sammons. A WIM norm was earned by WFM Martyna Starosta.

2026 – Charlotte, NC, November 25-29. The 2026 U.S. Masters will be held at the Hilton Charlotte University Place Hotel, under the organization of the Charlotte Chess Center's Dr. Walter High and Peter Giannatos, organized alongside the 2026 North Carolina Open. The format is a 9-round, 5-day super Swiss offering title norms, with a FIDE-rated time control of game in 80 minutes with a 30 second increment, organized under FIDE's "Fast Classic" program. The event is part of the 2026-2027 FIDE Circuit. There is a $27,500 prize fund, including a record $4,500 in female and senior prizes. The 2026 U.S. Masters is open to players who have ever been rated 2200+, plus players with FIDE titles of FM, WFM, or higher, plus juniors rated 1950+ FIDE and 2100+ USCF.
