= USCF Grand Prix =

Annual U.S. chess prize circuit

The USCF Grand Prix is an annual U.S. chess prize circuit organized by the United States Chess Federation. Players earn Grand Prix points by competing in qualifying prize-money tournaments. To be eligible, an event must guarantee at least $300 in prizes. Points are awarded based on finishing place and the tournament’s total prize fund. At the end of the year, cash prizes are awarded to the players with the most points. In 2024, the top prize was $5,000.

The first Grand Prix was sponsored by Church's Chicken in 1979. Their sponsorship lasted until the end of 1986. Other corporate sponsors of the Grand Prix include Novag Computers (1988–1998), Chess Cafe (2004–2007), World Chess Live (2008–2009), and chesslecture.com (2010).

The late Grandmaster Igor V. Ivanov has won the Grand Prix nine times. The late Grandmaster Aleksander Wojtkiewicz won the Grand Prix six years in a row, from 1999–2004.

== Winners ==
- 1979: GM Arthur Bisguier
- 1980: GM Roman Dzindzichashvili
- 1981: GM Dmitry Gurevich
- 1982–1986: GM Igor Ivanov
- 1987: IM Jay Whitehead
- 1988–1990: GM Igor Ivanov
- 1991: GM Alexander Ivanov
- 1992: GM Gregory Kaidanov
- 1993–1994: GM Alexander Ivanov
- 1995: GM Alex Yermolinsky
- 1996: GM Alexander Ivanov
- 1997: GM Igor Ivanov
- 1998: GM Alexander Stripunsky
- 1999–2004: GM Aleksander Wojtkiewicz
- 2005–2006: GM Jaan Ehlvest
- 2007: GM Zviad Izoria
- 2008–2010: GM Aleksandr Lenderman
- 2011: GM Sergey Kudrin
- 2012: GM Mikheil Kekelidze
- 2013: GM Aleksandr Lenderman
- 2014: GM Mark Paragua
- 2015: GM Gata Kamsky
- 2016: GM Ruifeng Li
- 2017: GM Elshan Moradiabadi
- 2018: GM Fidel Corrales Jimenez
- 2019: GM Hovhannes Gabuzyan
- 2020: IM Zurab Javakhadze
- 2021: GM Vladimir Belous
- 2022: IM Jason Liang
- 2023–2024: GM Zhou Jianchao

== Junior grand prix (JGP) ==
The JGP was created in 2008 to aid young skillful players in honing their skills with longer time controls and to change kids from causal players to life-long ones. It was discontinued in 2025.
