= Daniel Naroditsky =

American chess grandmaster (1995–2025)

- Naroditsky in 2024
- Born: November 9, 1995; San Mateo, California, U.S.
- Died: October 19, 2025 (aged 29); Charlotte, North Carolina, U.S.
- Education: Stanford University
- Chess career
- Country: United States
- Title: Grandmaster (2013)
- Peak rating: 2647 (May 2017)

Twitch information
- Channel: GMNaroditsky
- Followers: 335,000 (2026)

X information
- Handle: @GmNaroditsky
- Display name: Daniel Naroditsky
- Followers: 34,500 (2026)

YouTube information
- Channel: DanielNaroditskyGM
- Subscribers: 546,000 (2026)
- Views: 103.4 million (2026)

Daniel Aaron "Danya" Naroditsky (November 9, 1995 – October 19, 2025) was an American chess grandmaster, commentator, and content creator. He was widely considered one of the best speed chess players in the world and was consistently ranked among the top 25 players. His major tournament wins include the 2007 World Youth Championship, the 2013 U.S. Junior Championship, and the 2025 U.S. Blitz Championship. He became one of the youngest published authors in chess history at age 14 and earned the chess grandmaster title at age 17.

Naroditsky participated in the US Chess Championship five times, where he defeated world No. 2 Fabiano Caruana in 2021. One of his biggest achievements was tying for first place in the preliminary stage of the World Blitz Championship in 2024. In online chess, he was a top player in blitz and bullet, having been the No. 1 rated player at times in both formats on Chess.com and Lichess. He regularly finished in the top 3 in both the Chess.com Bullet and Hyperbullet Championships.

Naroditsky was a prominent chess streamer. He was known for his educational content on YouTube and Twitch and was highly regarded as a commentator. Naroditsky was an endgame columnist for Chess Life, and served as the New York Times chess columnist. He was the resident grandmaster at the Charlotte Chess Center from 2020 until his death in 2025.

Late in his career, Naroditsky was one of many prominent chess players who were the target of unsubstantiated cheating accusations by Vladimir Kramnik. Kramnik's allegations were condemned by many other professional chess players and prompted FIDE to open an ethics investigation against him.

He died on October 19, 2025, at his home in Charlotte, due to complications of sarcoidosis, aged 29.

== Early life and education ==
Daniel Aaron Naroditsky was born in San Mateo, California, on November 9, 1995. His parents were Jewish immigrants from the Soviet Union. His father, Vladimir, emigrated from Ukraine, while his mother, Lena Schuman, came from Azerbaijan.

Naroditsky attended high school at Crystal Springs Uplands School in Hillsborough, California. He graduated from Stanford University with a bachelor's degree in history in 2019.

== Chess career ==
Naroditsky learned chess at age 6 from his older brother, and later his father. He often held the No. 1 rank for his age group according to the United States Chess Federation and won the 2007 Northern California K–12 Chess Championship, the youngest player ever to do so, according to Chess.com. In November 2007, Naroditsky won the Under-12 section of the World Youth Chess Championship with 9½/11, tying with Illya Nyzhnyk and winning the gold medal on tiebreaks. His win earned him the title of FIDE Master. At the time, he was a member of the Mechanics' Institute Chess Club.

In February 2010, aged 14 and 3 months, Naroditsky became the youngest published chess author upon the release of Mastering Positional Chess: Practical Lessons of a Junior World Champion by New In Chess. At the 2010 U.S. Open, Naroditsky scored 7½/9 to share second place with Alexander Shabalov, Varuzhan Akobian, and Julio Sadorra, but behind Alejandro Ramírez. This qualified him for the 2011 U.S. Championship. In February 2011, he was awarded the title of International Master. Naroditsky competed in the 2011, 2012, and 2013 U.S. Junior Championships. He won clear first place in 2013 with 6½/9, ahead of Samuel Sevian and Luke Harmon-Vellotti. The 2013 victory qualified him for the 2014 U.S. Championship.

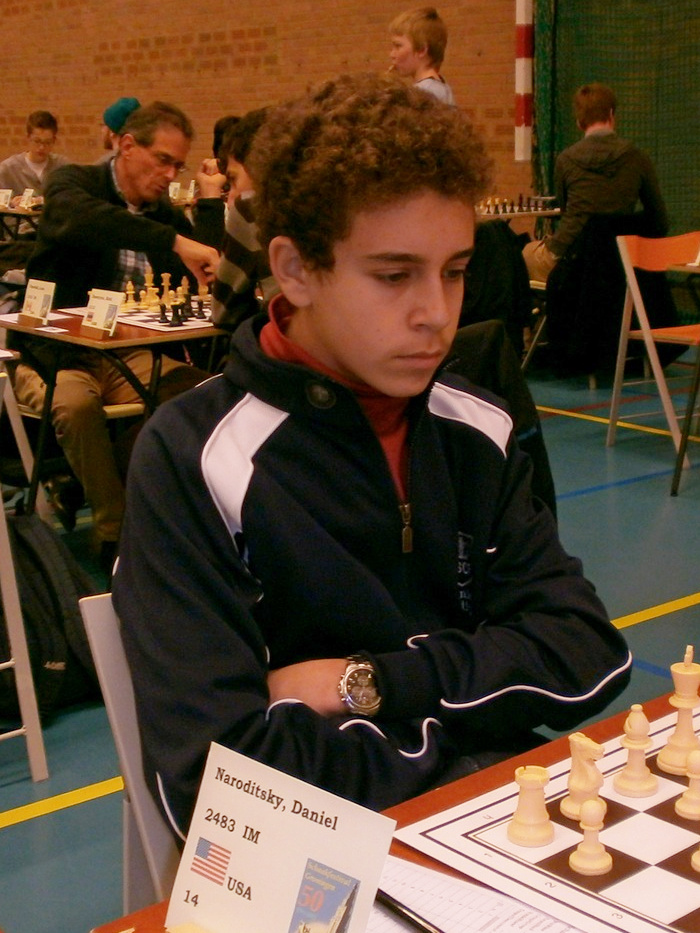
Naroditsky playing in the Groningen Chess Festival 2012

Naroditsky earned his first grandmaster (GM) norm at the Benasque Open in July 2011. He earned his second GM norm at the 2013 Philadelphia Open by tying for first place with Fidel Corrales Jimenez. He earned his final GM norm at the 2013 Benasque Open. Naroditsky was officially awarded the GM title in 2013.

In 2014, Naroditsky was awarded the Samford Chess Fellowship. Later that year, he tied for fifth place in the Millionaire Chess Open in Las Vegas. In 2015, Naroditsky represented the United States at the World Team Championship, where he scored 4/7, defeating Dmitry Jakovenko and Evgeny Postny but lost to Hrant Melkumyan. He finished with a performance rating of 2640.

Naroditsky played in the 2011, 2014, 2015, 2017, and 2021 U.S. Championships. In the 2021 U.S. Championship, he defeated Fabiano Caruana who was rated 2800 FIDE and ranked No. 2 in the world. In 2019, Naroditsky tied for first place at the U.S. Masters Championship.

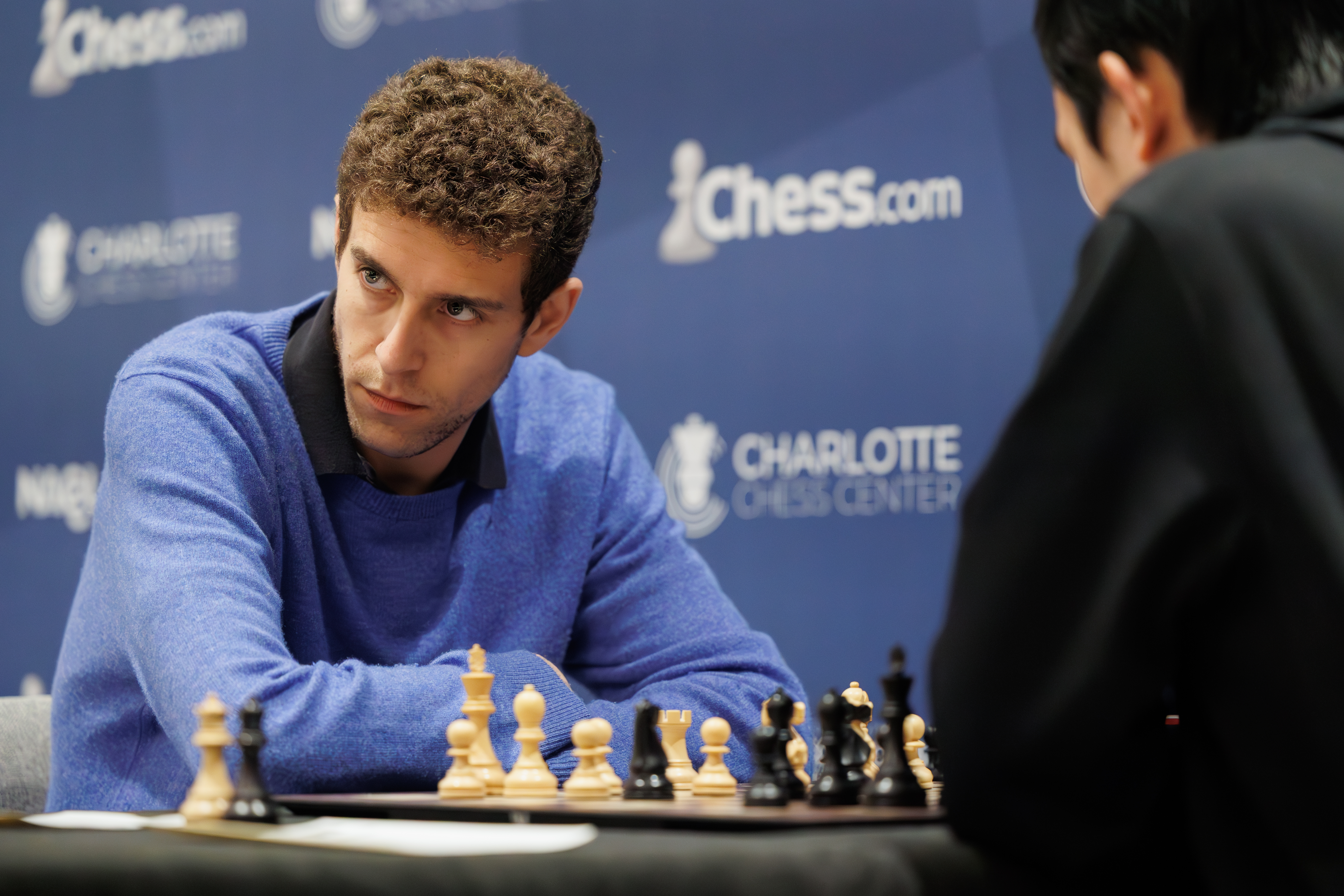
Daniel Naroditsky playing in the 2024 US Masters Blitz

In December 2024, Naroditsky tied for first place in the Swiss portion of the 2024 World Blitz Chess Championship with a score of 9½/13 and performance rating of 2749, finishing 9th place on tiebreaks but failing to advance to the 8-player knockout stage. In August 2025, Naroditsky won the U.S. National Blitz Championship with a score of 14/14.

By FIDE ratings, Naroditsky was consistently ranked in the top 200 in the World and top 15 in the U.S. in Classical, top 75 in Rapid, and top 25 in Blitz. He reached his peak Fide classical rating of 2647 in May 2017. In August 2024, Naroditsky crossed 2700 FIDE Blitz rating for the first time. At the time of his death, his FIDE blitz rating was 2705, ranking No. 23 in the world.

Naroditsky played online chess on Chess.com under the handle DanielNaroditsky, and on Lichess under the handle RebeccaHarris. He frequently ranked at the top of both websites' leaderboards in Blitz and Bullet. His peak bullet rating on Chess.com was 3553, and his peak bullet rating on Lichess.org was 3326. Naroditsky regularly participated in the Chess.com Bullet and Hyperbullet Championships. He finished in 3rd place in the inaugural Bullet Championship in 2022, and again in 2024 and 2025. He was runner-up in the Hyperbullet Championship in both of the first two editions in 2024 and 2025. Naroditsky also regularly participated in the weekly Bullet Brawl arena tournaments on Chess.com, winning 32 times.

== Writing and other activities ==
At 14 years old, Naroditsky published the book Mastering Positional Chess in 2010, becoming one of the youngest authors of a chess book. His second book, Mastering Complex Endgames, was released in 2012. He wrote The Practical Endgame, a column in Chess Life Magazine, from 2014 to 2020. In 2022, he wrote a series of 19 columns featuring interactive chess puzzles based on historical games for The New York Times.

In 2020, Naroditsky moved to Charlotte, North Carolina. From 2020 to 2025, he was the Grandmaster-in-Residence of the Charlotte Chess Center.

Naroditsky was an active content creator on YouTube and Twitch, where he had over 494,000 subscribers and 340,000 followers, respectively, at the time of his death. He was well known for his educational chess content. Naroditsky was a frequent commentator for top-level Chess.com events, and was named their lead commentator in 2021. He was highly regarded as a commentator for being insightful and entertaining, and his ability to make puns. He regularly commentated alongside fellow American Grandmaster Robert Hess, and the two have been referred to as a "commentary dream team".

== Accusations by Vladimir Kramnik ==
Beginning in October 2024, Naroditsky was repeatedly accused of cheating by former world champion Vladimir Kramnik, without substantial evidence. Since 2023, Kramnik has accused numerous other players of cheating with flawed or insubstantial corroborating evidence. Naroditsky rejected the allegations, stating "To do what Kramnik has done and what everybody who supports him have done, in my mind, morally, it makes you worse than dirt." Naroditsky also commented on those that support Kramnik directly, calling them an "army of troglodyte lowlifes." Naroditsky was defended against the accusations by several figures of the chess community, including prominent figures such as GM Hikaru Nakamura and IM Levy Rozman, among many others. Kramnik's cheating allegations against Naroditsky continued until his death.

During a podcast hosted by fellow GMs Fabiano Caruana and Cristian Chirilă in 2024, Naroditsky said the allegations had taken a deep toll on him. He called Kramnik's campaign "...a sustained, evil, and absolutely unhinged attempt to destroy my life," adding, "He is trying to ruin my life, he’s trying to inflict emotional harm, physical harm on me. He knows exactly what he’s doing." In his final livestream, on October 17, 2025, he suggested people might assume "the worst of intentions" if he were to start playing well off-stream.

Following his death, FIDE said it was investigating Kramnik's campaign against Naroditsky, following calls for action by the chess community, including figures such as Nihal Sarin, Anna Cramling, and Nemo Zhou. FIDE President Arkady Dvorkovich said they will refer all relevant public statements made by Kramnik to the Ethics and Disciplinary Commission. Former world champion Magnus Carlsen, Hikaru Nakamura, and others condemned Kramnik's conduct. As of October 27, an online petition for FIDE to ban Kramnik had reached over 50,000 signatures. In a statement on X, Kramnik referred to Naroditsky's death as a tragedy and denied making any personal attacks towards Naroditsky. In July 2026, FIDE issued Kramnik a two-year ban from FIDE competitions and chess-related activities with the final 12 months of the ban suspended for a three-year probationary period.

== Death and legacy ==
Naroditsky was found unresponsive on his couch by Olexandr Bortnyk and Peter Giannatos in his home in Charlotte on the evening of October 19, 2025, and was pronounced dead by medics at the scene at the age of 29. The Charlotte Chess Center announced his death the following day, citing the family's request for privacy. Police reported no evidence of foul play.

According to the medical examiner's report released in January 2026, Naroditsky's death was ruled accidental and attributed to probable cardiac arrhythmia due to probable cardiac involvement of systemic sarcoidosis. Methamphetamine and kratom were detected in his system, but the levels were determined to be non-lethal and were listed only as contributory factors.

Naroditsky's death became public during the 2025 United States Chess Championship, and the competition day on October 20 began with a moment of silence in his honor. FIDE said that it would honor him with a special award and establish a prize in his name, recognizing his contributions as a player, teacher, and commentator.

Chess.com named the trophy of its online Speed Chess Championship the Naroditsky Cup in his honor as well as a variation of the Four Knights Game.

The Charlotte Chess Center and the Naroditsky family created the Daniel Naroditsky Memorial Fund, which raised over $1.1 million to create both the "Naroditsky Memorial Rapid and Blitz Championship", an official tournament, and the "Naroditsky Fellowship", a scholarship program for young chess players. The first Naroditsky Memorial was held July 3–5, 2026.

== Books ==
- Naroditsky, Daniel (2010). Mastering Positional Chess: Practical Lessons from a Junior World Champion. Alkmaar, Netherlands: New In Chess. ISBN 978-90-5691-310-6. OCLC 436031073.
- Naroditsky, Daniel (2012). Mastering Complex Endgames: Practical Lessons, Critical Ideas & Plans. Alkmaar, Netherlands: New In Chess. ISBN 978-9056914059. OCLC 795757107.
