= Evgeny Postny =

Israeli chess grandmaster (born 1981)

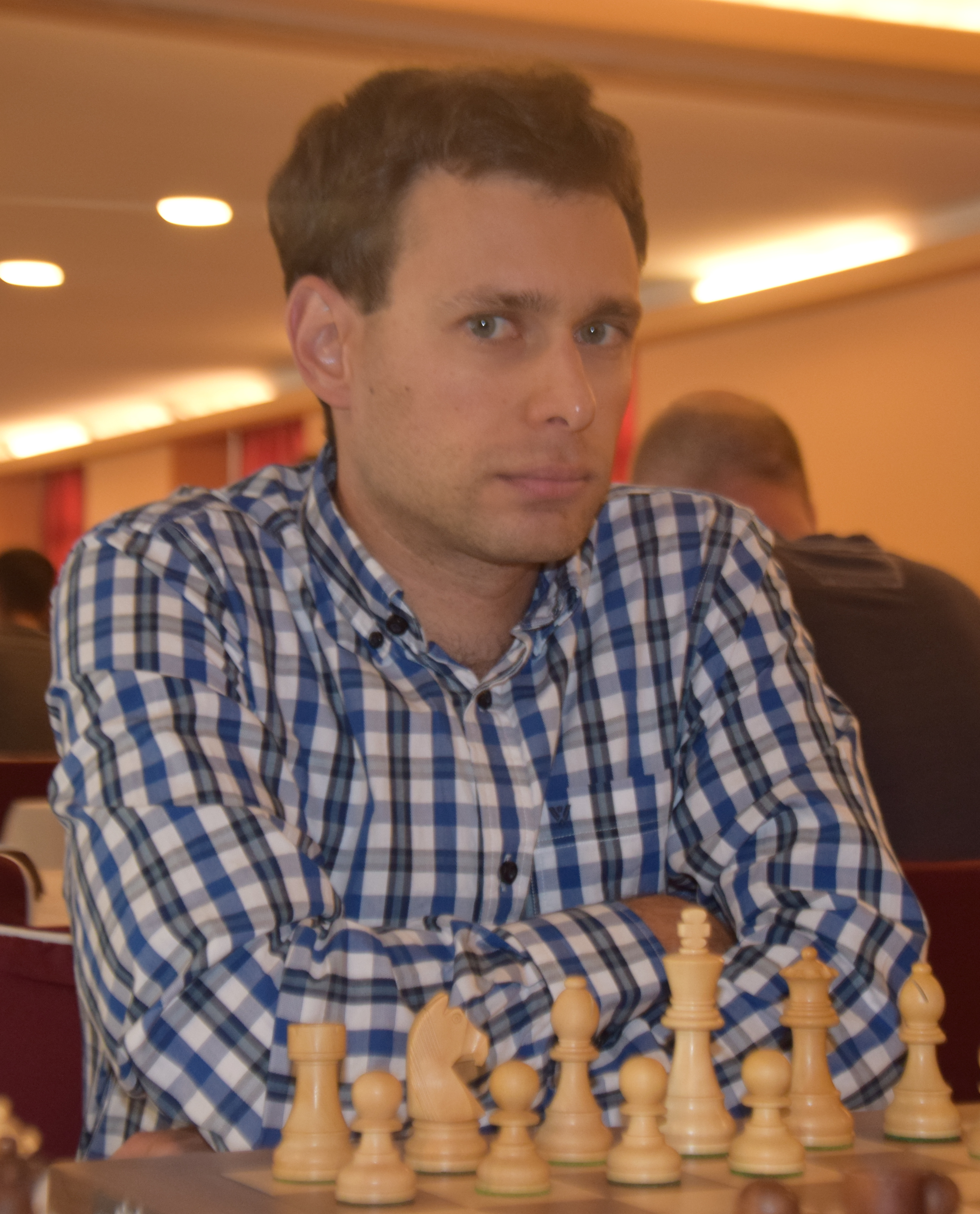
- Postny at the 2018 Andorra open

Personal information
- Native name: אבגני פוסטני
- Born: 3 July 1981 (age 45) Novosibirsk, Russian SFSR, Soviet Union

Chess career
- Country: Israel
- Title: Grandmaster (2002)
- FIDE rating: 2528 (July 2026)
- Peak rating: 2674 (October 2008)
- Peak ranking: No. 48 (October 2008)

Evgeny Postny (Hebrew: אבגני פוסטני; born 3 July 1981) is an Israeli chess player. He was awarded the title Grandmaster by FIDE in 2002. Postny was a member of the Israeli team which took the silver medal in the Chess Olympiad of 2008. He competed in the FIDE World Cup in 2011 and 2013.

== Early career ==
Born in Novosibirsk, Postny was taught chess by his father at age 5. Entering tournaments from age 8, he immediately saw success. As a junior player, he won the Russian under 14 championship and in international competitions such as the world and the European youth championships he took three medals;

- Litochoro 1999, European Youth Chess Championship (under 18) - Silver
- Oropesa del Mar 1999, World Youth Chess Championship (under 18) - Bronze
- Rio 2001, European Junior Chess Championship (under 20) - Bronze

In the space of two weeks, the 18-year-old Postny won the 2001 junior (under 20) championship of Israel, won the National Open Championship, got his first grandmaster norm and received prize money totalling $3,500.

== International tournaments ==
At a senior level, he has continued to enjoy success in international tournaments, with outright or shared wins occurring at;

- Tel Aviv 1998
- Budapest 2002 (First Saturday Tournament, shared with Levente Vajda)
- Budapest 2002 (Elekes, shared with Humpy Koneru)
- Balatonlelle 2003 (jointly with Mark Bluvshtein)
- Budapest 2003 (FST)
- Bad Wiessee 2005 (shared with David Baramidze, Aleksander Delchev, Leonid Kritz and others)
- Stockholm, Rilton Cup 2005/6 (with Normunds Miezis, Sergey Ivanov, Eduardas Rozentalis and Tomi Nybäck)
- Metz 2006
- Dresden 2006 (jointly with Alexander Graf and Igor Khenkin)
- Maalot-Tarshiha 2008 (jointly with Ilya Smirin).
- Nancy 2010
- Greensboro, North Carolina 2018 U.S. Masters Chess Championship (jointly with Jeffery Xiong, Hovhannes Gabuzyan, Timur Gareyev, Sergey Erenburg, Yuri Gonzalez Vidal, John Michael Burke, Djurabek Khamrakulov

He was at the second place in the International chess tournament Open Teplice 2015 in Czech Republic.

Postny has played on the Israeli national team in the Chess Olympiad, the World Team Chess Championship and the European Team Chess Championship. He made his debut in the national team in 2008 at the 38th Chess Olympiad in Dresden, where Israel took the silver medal. It was the first medal ever won by Israel in a Chess Olympiad.
