= Sergei Azarov =

Belarusian chess grandmaster (born 1983)

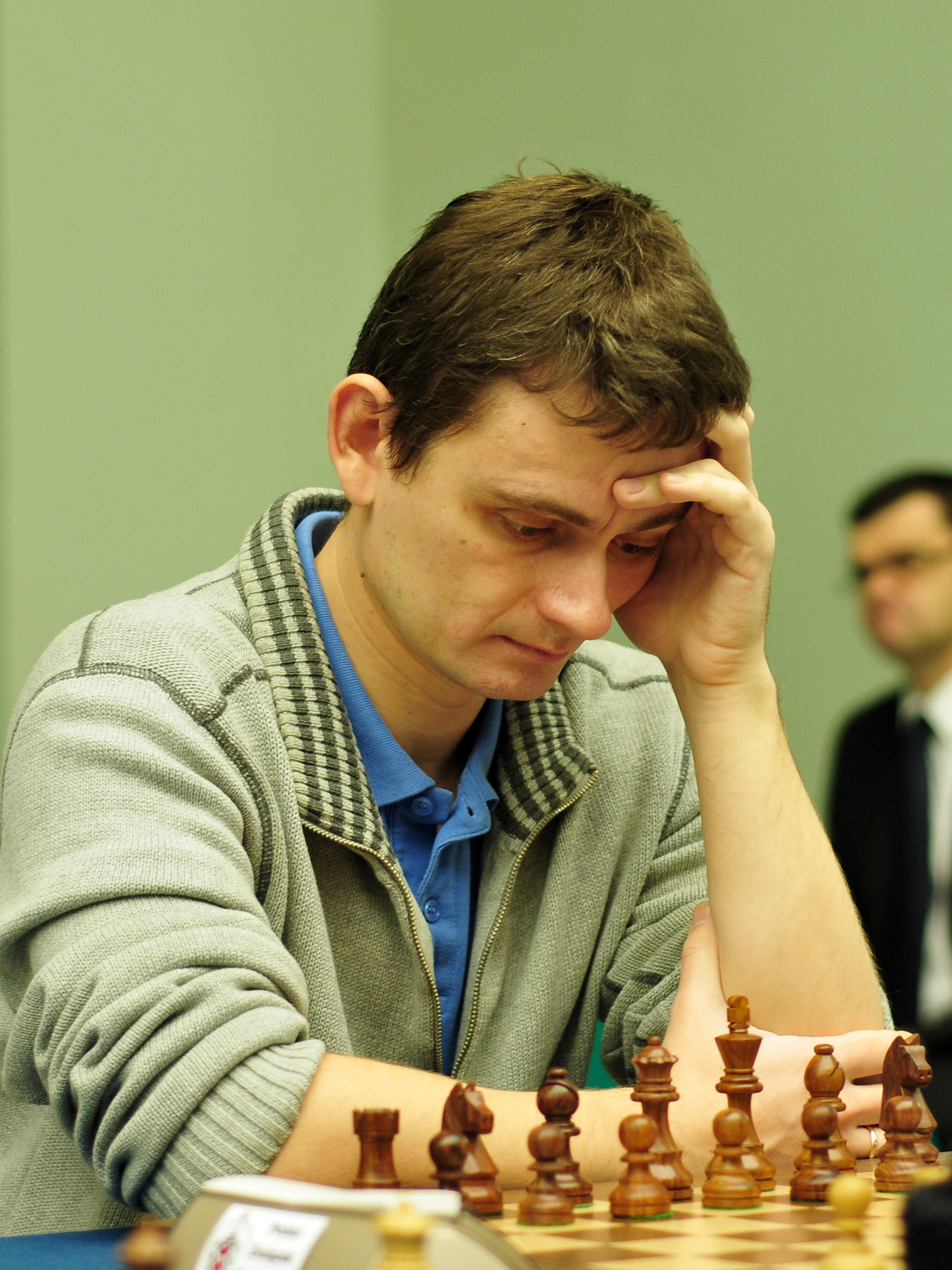
- Sergei Azarov, Baku 2023

Personal information
- Born: 19 May 1983 (age 43) Minsk, Byelorussian SSR, Soviet Union

Chess career
- Country: Belarus (until 2022); FIDE (since 2022)
- Title: Grandmaster (2003)
- FIDE rating: 2538 (July 2026)
- Peak rating: 2667 (November 2011)
- Peak ranking: No. 77 (November 2011)

Sergei Nikolayevich Azarov (Russian: Серге́й Николаевич Азаров; Belarusian: Сяргей Мікалаевіч Азараў, Siarhiej Mikalajevič Azaraŭ; born 19 May 1983) is a Belarusian chess player, International Grandmaster a title awarded by FIDE in 2003. He has been a two-time Belarusian Chess Champion and has competed in multiple Chess Olympiads and FIDE World Cups.

== Chess career ==
He won the Belarusian championship in 2001 and 2002, both times in Minsk, his native city. In 2002, he shared first place in the Challengers tournament at the Hastings Chess Congress.

At the 2003 World Junior Chess Championship in Nakhchivan, he finished in second place, behind Shakhriyar Mamedyarov. In 2006 he won the fifth Istanbul Chess Festival. In 2009, he won the Béthune Open. In the 2011 FIDE World Cup he won against Artyom Timofeev in the first round, then in the second round he lost to Vugar Gashimov. In 2012, Azarov tied for second place and finished tenth on tiebreak at the European Individual Championship with a score of 8/11 points. Thanks to this result he qualified to play in the FIDE World Cup 2013. Also in 2012, Azarov won the 3rd Annual Continental Class Championships in Arlington, Virginia, US edging out Sergey Erenburg on tiebreaks. The following year, he participated in the World Cup; he was eliminated in the first round after losing to Alexey Dreev in the tiebreaks. In March 2014, Azarov tied for first place with Axel Bachmann in the Cappelle-la-Grande Open, finishing second on tiebreak. Later that year, in October, he tied for 1st–5th with Timur Gareev, Dávid Bérczes, Daniel Naroditsky and Sam Shankland in the inaugural Millionaire Chess Open in Las Vegas.

With the Belarusian national team, he took part in the European Team Chess Championship in 2001 and 2003 and in five Chess Olympiads between 2000 and 2008. At the club level, he played in the European Club Cup in 2001 and in 2003–2007 for Vesnianka Minsk. Since 2009 he has played for the Ukrainian club A DAN DZO & PGMB Luhansk. In Romania, he plays for Sah Club Hidrocon Bacău, in the Czech Republic for BŠŠ Frýdek-Místek, and in Slovakia for ŠK Caissa Čadca.

In 2019, Azarov tied for first place at the U.S. Masters Chess Championship.
