= Carlos Antonio Hevia Alejano =

Cuban chess grandmaster (born 1991)

Personal information
- Born: October 30, 1991 (age 34) Havana, Cuba

Chess career
- Country: Cuba
- Title: Grandmaster (2015)
- FIDE rating: 2449 (July 2026)
- Peak rating: 2549 (July 2012)

Carlos Antonio Hevia Alejano is a Cuban chess grandmaster.

== Chess career ==
In December 2014, he played for the Cuban team in the ITT Millonario de Navidad in Bogota.

In February 2017, he played in the Southwest Class Championship, where he was defeated by rising grandmaster Sam Sevian.

In April 2018, he was part of the winning UT Rio Grande Valley team that played in the President's Cup, alongside Vladimir Belous, Kamil Dragun, Andrey Stukopin, and Hovhannes Gabuzyan.

In November 2019, he had a perfect score after two rounds of the King's Island Open.

In January 2021, he represented the UT Dallas team at the 2020–21 Pan-American Intercollegiate Chess Championship, where he lost to Jason Shi.
