= Justin Wang =

American chess player (born 2005)

Personal information
- Born: May 23, 2005 (age 21) Katy, Texas

Chess career
- Country: United States
- Title: International Master (2019)
- FIDE rating: 2524 (October 2026)
- Peak rating: 2529 (April 2025)

Justin Wang is an American chess player.

== Chess career ==
He started playing chess at the age of 7 with his brother.

In December 2017, he got his first IM norm at the St. Louis Invitational. He won the tournament after defeating Luis Torres in tiebreaks. He was later awarded the International Master title in 2019.

In June 2019, he won the U16 section of the U.S. Cadet Championship with a score of 6/7, a half-point ahead of runner-up Hans Niemann.

In November 2023, he won the U.S. Masters Chess Championship alongside Mikhail Antipov, Gleb Dudin, and Bryce Tiglon.

In May 2025, he played an 810-move game against Hikaru Nakamura in a Titled Tuesday tournament.
