= Bryce Tiglon =

American chess grandmaster (born 2000)

Personal information
- Born: December 28, 2000 (age 25) Seattle, Washington

Chess career
- Country: United States
- Title: Grandmaster (2024)
- FIDE rating: 2526 (October 2026)
- Peak rating: 2550 (February 2026)

Bryce Isaac Tiglon (born December 28, 2000) is an American chess grandmaster.

== Chess career ==
In April 2016, Tiglon tied for first place at the National High School Championship held in Atlanta, Georgia.

In July 2017, Tiglon won a Gold Medal at the 2017 North American Youth (U18) Chess Championships and was awarded the International Master (IM) title. In August of the same year, Tiglon tied for first at the prestigious GM Arnold Denker National Tournament of High School State Champions.

In November 2018, Tiglon earned his first GM norm by winning the 2018 North American Junior (U20) Chess Championships held in Baja California, Mexico.

In March 2019, Tiglon won the National High School Blitz Tournament with a near-perfect score of 11.5/12, only drawing against Joseph Wan in the final round. That same year, he won the Denker Tournament of High School Champions for the second time.

In November 2023, Tiglon earned his second GM norm by tying for first place in the U.S. Masters Chess Championship with Mikhail Antipov, Gleb Dudin, and Justin Wang, finishing ahead of 39 out of 40 grandmasters in the event.

In December 2023, Tiglon earned his third and final GM norm at the Chessable Sunway Sitges International Chess Festival held in Sitges, Spain.

== Personal life ==
Tiglon studied molecular biology and computer science at Stanford University. He is currently pursuing his Ph.D. in Biological and Biomedical Sciences at Harvard University.
