= Daniel Ludwig =

Daniel Ludwig may refer to:

- Daniel K. Ludwig, American shipping businessman
- Daniel Ludwig (chess player), American chess player
