= Daniel Ludwig (chess player) =

American chess player (born 1990)

Personal information
- Born: April 1990 (age 36) Orlando, Florida

Chess career
- Country: United States
- Title: International Master (2009)
- FIDE rating: 2484 (October 2026)
- Peak rating: 2484 (September 2013)

Daniel J. Ludwig is an American chess player.

== Chess career ==
In March 2006, he won the U.S. Masters Chess Championship alongside Giorgi Margvelashvili, Andrey Chumachenko, Bryan Smith, and Ronald Burnett.

In February 2009, he achieved his first GM norm at the First Saturday GM tournament in Budapest.

In May 2012, he tied for second place with six other players in the Chicago Open. He scored a GM norm at the event and defeated grandmaster Michael Adams.

In December 2012, he won the Eastern Open in Washington, D.C. with a score of 6.5/8.
