= Alexander Fishbein =

American chess grandmaster (born 1968)

Personal information
- Born: Alexander Gregory Fishbein; May 8, 1968 (age 58) Leningrad, Russian SFSR, USSR

Chess career
- Country: United States
- Title: Grandmaster (1992)
- FIDE rating: 2428 (October 2026)
- Peak rating: 2550 (January 1995)

Alexander Gregory Fishbein (born May 8, 1968 in Leningrad, Russian SFSR, USSR as Aleksandr Grigoryevich Fishbein, Russian: Александр Григорьевич Фишбейн) is an American chess player with the FIDE title of Grandmaster (GM).

== Career ==
At the age of four, he learned chess from his father, Gregory, (Russian: Григорий Абрамович Фишбейн; Grigory Abramovich Fishbein), who is a National Master.

The family immigrated to the US in 1979. In 1985, he won the first Arnold Denker Tournament of High School Champions. In 2018, he also won the inaugural John T. Irwin National Tournament of Senior State Champions, repeating that victory in 2020. In the 1990s, Fishbein won tournaments in Stavanger, Norway, and Herning, Denmark and shared first place in several major Opens in the United States, including the World Open and National Open. He was awarded the grandmaster title in 1992.

Although Fishbein has worked in finance since 1993, focusing on investment strategies and trading of mortgage-backed securities since 2005, and is registered with FINRA, he continues to compete in chess tournaments. He played in the U.S. Chess Championship four times in the 2000s (the best result: eighth place in 2006). Since 2012, he has regularly appeared in Grand Prix tournaments in the Eastern United States and has finished first or equal first many times.

In July 2025, Fishbein won the 2025 U.S. Senior (Closed) Championship in Saint Louis as the 9th seed out of 10, after winning a playoff against Vladimir Akopian and Alexander Shabalov.

Fishbein and his wife, Lana, have three children: Ellen, Samuel, and Mitch.

== Books ==
- Fishbein, Alexander (1993), King and Pawn Endings, American Chess Promotions, ISBN 0-939298-39-2
- Fishbein, Alexander (1996), Fischer!, R & D Publishing, ISBN 1-883358-11-6
- Fishbein, Alexander (2017), The Scotch Gambit, Russell Enterprises, ISBN 978-1-941270-74-5
- Fishbein, Alexander (2021), The Exchange French Comes to Life, Russell Enterprises, ISBN 978-1-949859-29-4
- Müller, Karsten; Fishbein, Alex (2023), Endgame Corner, Russell Enterprises, ISBN 978-1949859-85-0
- Fishbein, Alexander (2024), My System: FastTrack Edition, Russell Enterprises, ISBN 978-1949859-89-8

== Notable chess games ==
- Alexey Shirov vs Alexander Fishbein, Kerteminde 1991, King's Indian Defense: Orthodox Variation, Modern System (E97), 0-1
- Alexander Fishbein vs Yury Shulman, US Championship 2006. French Defense, Tarrasch Variation (C09). 1-0
