= Yaroslav Zherebukh =

Ukrainian-American chess grandmaster (born 1993)

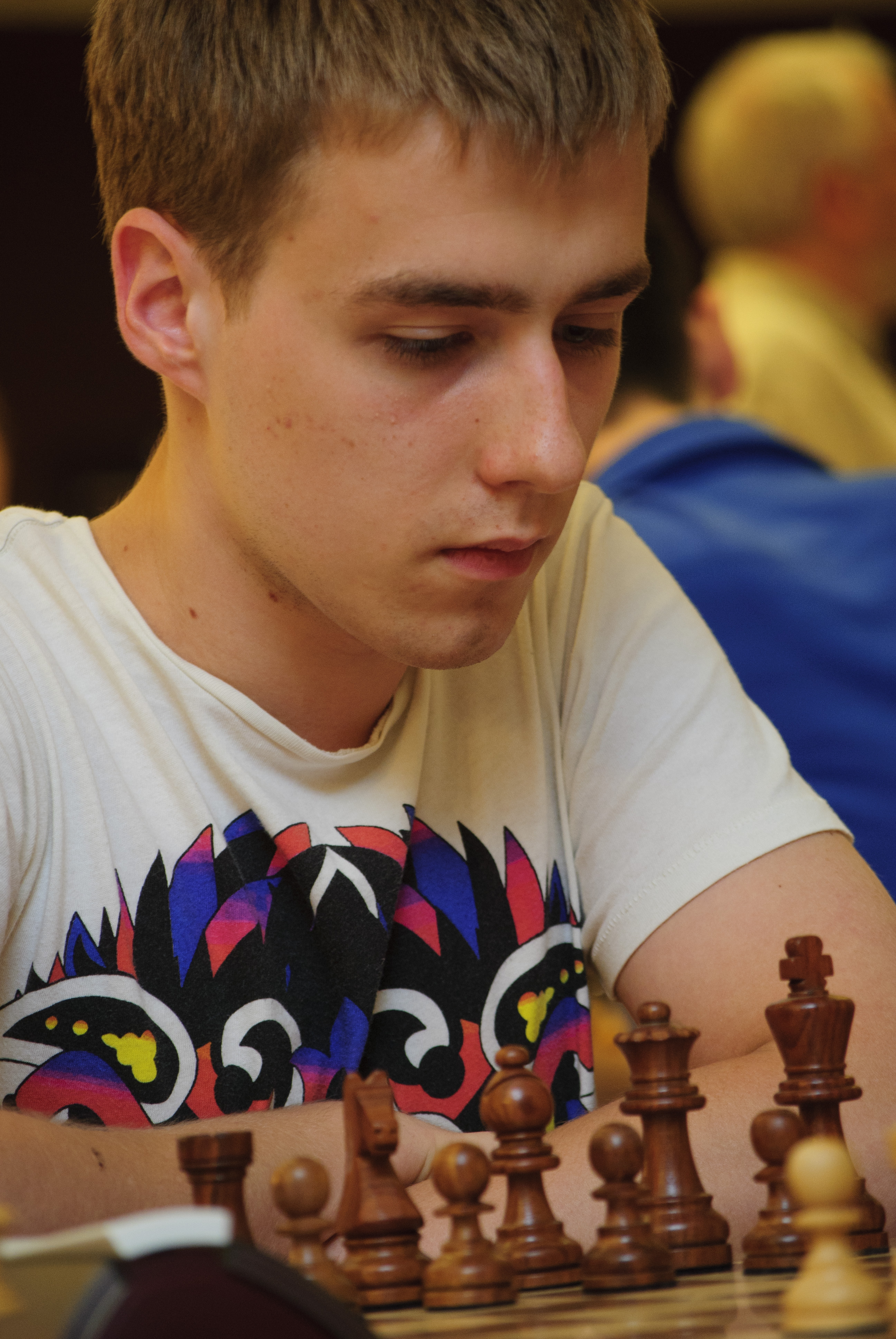
- Zherebukh in 2012

Personal information
- Born: July 14, 1993 (age 33) Lviv, Ukraine

Chess career
- Country: Ukraine (until 2015); United States (since 2015)
- Title: Grandmaster (2009)
- FIDE rating: 2620 (October 2026)
- Peak rating: 2642 (June 2017)

Yaroslav Volodymyrovych Zherebukh (Ukrainian: Ярослав Володимирович Жеребух; born July 14, 1993) is a Ukrainian-American chess grandmaster (2009). Zherebukh was born in Lviv, Ukraine.

== Career ==
In 2006, he was a Ukrainian national youth team member, which won the U-16 Chess Olympiad in Turkey. His biggest success so far has been his victory, in February 2010, of the colossal Cappelle-la-Grande Open in France, ahead of 82 Grandmasters and 61 International masters (652 players), with 7.5 points out of 9.

In 2010, Zherebukh scored 8/11 (7 wins, 2 losses, 2 draws) to win the Young Stars of the World tournament, held in Kirishi, Russia.

In the 2011 World Cup, held in Khanty-Mansiysk, he caused a sensation by eliminating two super-grandmasters, Pavel Eljanov and Shakhriyar Mamedyarov in the first and third rounds. Eventually he was knocked out by Czech super-GM David Navara.

In May 2015, Zherebukh switched his affiliation from Ukraine to the United States. Later in 2015, Zherebukh tied for first place at the U.S. Masters Chess Championship. In 2016 he qualified to compete in the 2017 U.S. Championship where he scored a notable win in the seventh round against world #3 and reigning US Champion Fabiano Caruana.

In 2020, Zherebukh won the Chicago Chess Center 3rd Jane Addams Memorial.

Zherebukh has stated that Akiba Rubinstein is his favourite chess player, "because of his perfect technique and very rich understanding of chess."
