= Bryan Smith (chess player) =

American chess grandmaster (born 1980)

Personal information
- Born: February 26, 1980 (age 46) California, U.S.

Chess career
- Country: United States
- Title: Grandmaster (2013)
- Peak rating: 2503 (July 2011)

Bryan Garrett Smith (born February 26, 1980) is an American chess grandmaster.

== Chess career ==
Smith grew up in Anchorage, Alaska. He did not learn the rules of chess until age 13 and only played his first FIDE rated tournament at age 19.

In November 2008 he won clear first in the National Chess Congress, defeating GMs Sergey Erenburg and Leonid Kritz in the process.

In May 2011, he earned a Grandmaster norm in the LIMPEDEA Cup in Romania on the way to winning the tournament.

Smith earned his third GM norm in the 2013 Michigan Chess Festival and was awarded the title later in 2013.

In November 2017, Smith won the 48th National Chess Congress, held in Philadelphia. The event had seven other grandmasters. During the tournament, Smith defeated Alexander Shabalov and drew against Alexey Dreev.

In May 2024, Smith competed at the Sheridan Open, hosted by the Sheridan Chess Association in Sheridan, Wyoming. He was one of three grandmasters to compete in the tournament.

In September 2025, Smith won the individual championship of the Württemberg region of Germany, a round robin tournament which also featured GMs Andrei Sokolov and Eduardas Rozentalis.

In May 2026, Smith returned to the Sheridan Open, now renamed to the Wyoming Community Foundation Open. Prior to the main tournament, he conducted a simultaneous exhibition at the Sheridan Fulmer Public Library. In the main event, Smith tied for first place with GM Zhou Jianchao and NM Griffin McConnell.
