= Alexander Onischuk =

Ukrainian-American chess grandmaster (born 1975)

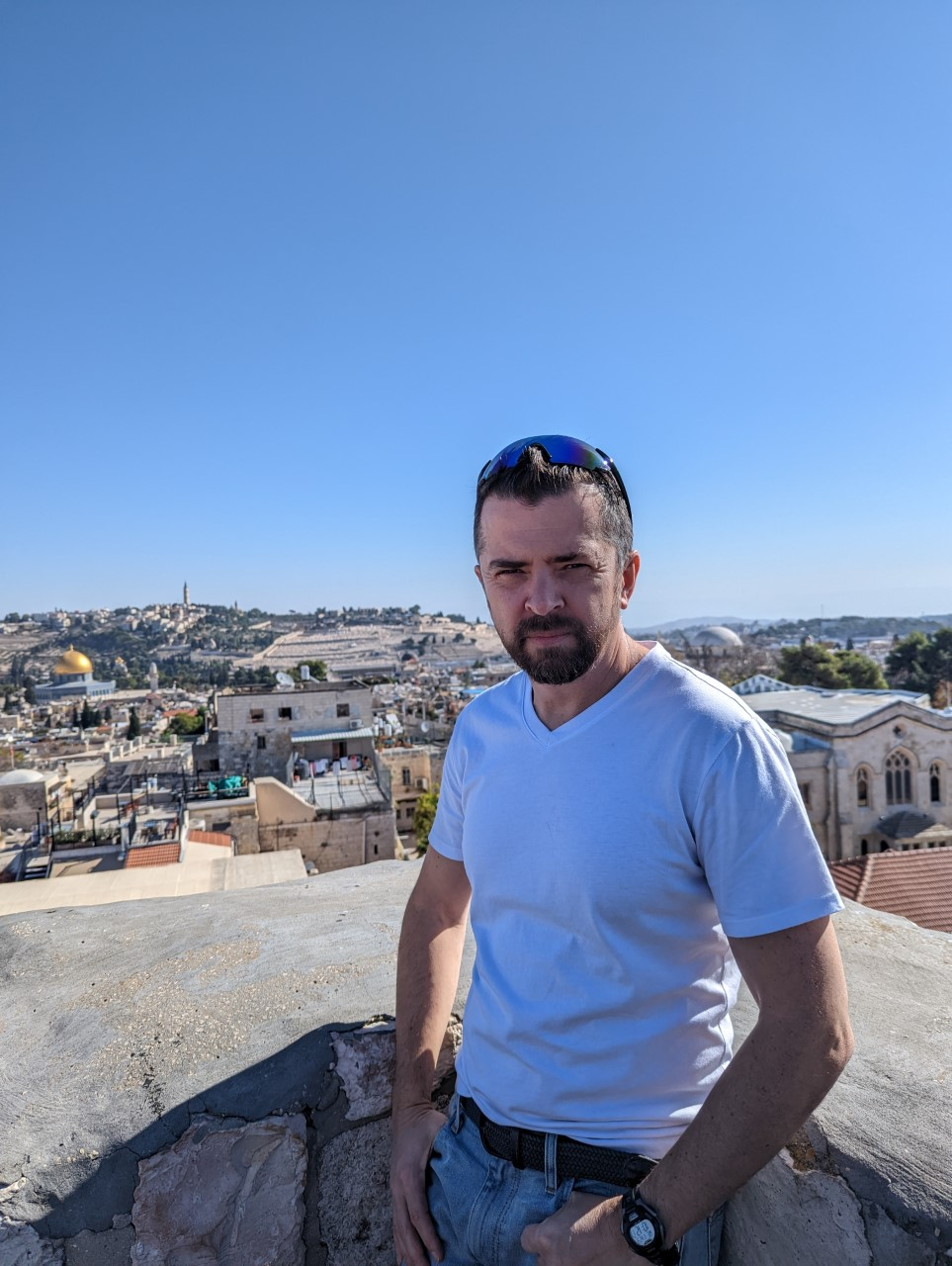
- Onischuk in 2022

Personal information
- Born: September 3, 1975 (age 51) Sevastopol, Ukrainian SSR, Soviet Union (now Ukraine)

Chess career
- Country: Soviet Union (until 1992); Ukraine (1992–2002); United States (since 2002)
- Title: Grandmaster (1994)
- FIDE rating: 2639 (October 2026)
- Peak rating: 2701 (July 2010)
- Ranking: No. 80 (October 2026)
- Peak ranking: No. 27 (July 1999)

Alexander Vasylovych Onischuk (Note: Ukrainian: Олександр Васильович Оніщук, romanized: Oleksandr Vasylovych Onishchuk) born September 3, 1975) is a chess player. He was awarded the title of Grandmaster by FIDE in 1994, and won the 2006 U.S. championship.

== Career ==
In 1991, Onischuk represented the Soviet Union and took 2nd place in the World under 16 championship. In 1993 he was fourth in the world junior championship, tying for first and finished second on tie-breaks two years later. In 1993 he became International Master, and in 1994 Grandmaster. In 2000 he won the Ukrainian Championship. He represented Ukraine in the Chess Olympiad in 1994, 1996 and 1998.

Onischuk immigrated to the United States in 2001. He competed in the US Championship, winning the tournament in 2006, finishing 2nd in 2007, 2008 and 2017 and finishing 3rd four more times.

In 2002, Onischuk tied for first place at the U.S. Masters Chess Championship.

By FIDE rating, Onischuk was the highest rated American player from April 2002 - January 2005.

He played in the FIDE World Chess Championship in 2000 and 2004, and in the FIDE World Cup every year between 2007 and 2017. He also represented the US in six Chess Olympiads and seven World Team Chess Championships.

In the fall of 2012, Onischuk became the head coach at Texas Tech University. Under his coaching, the Texas Tech University Chess Program has won the 2015-2016 and 2019-2020 Pan-American Intercollegiate Team Chess Championships and played in the President's cup 5 times.

In 2018 he was inducted into the US Chess Hall of Fame.

He was the Chief Organizer of 2018 and 2021 Texas Collegiate Super Finals and 2022 President's Cup – Final Four of College Chess.

== Notes ==
Preceded by Hikaru Nakamura	United States Chess Champion; 2006	Succeeded by Alexander Shabalov
