= Steven Zierk =

American chess grandmaster (born 1993)

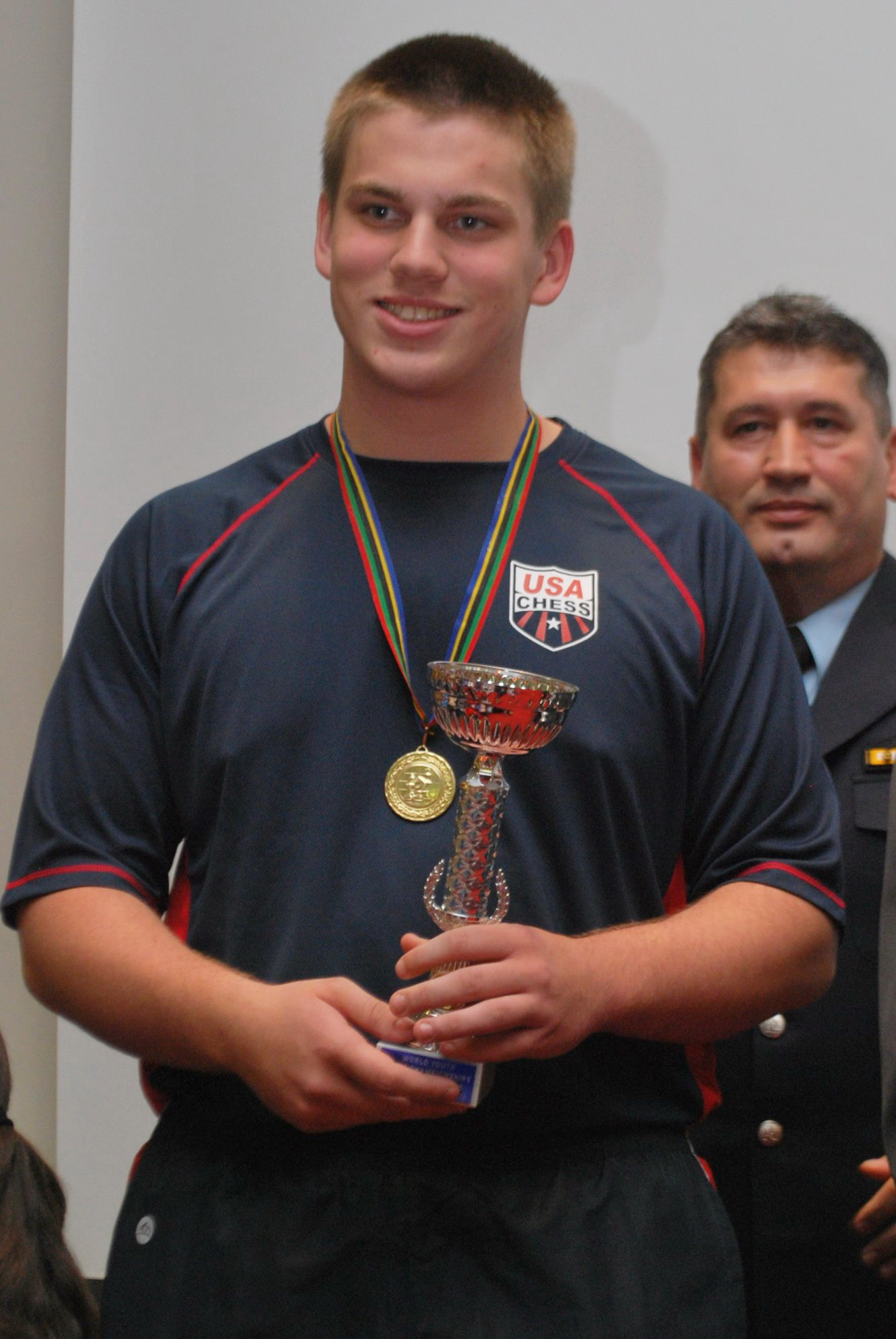
- Zierk in 2010

Personal information
- Born: August 27, 1993 (age 33) Mountain View, California

Chess career
- Country: United States
- Title: Grandmaster (2018)
- FIDE rating: 2489 (October 2026)
- Peak rating: 2517 (September 2019)

Steven C. Zierk (/zɜːrk/ ZERK; born August 27, 1993) is an American chess Grandmaster. He is best known for being the 2010 World Under 18 Chess Champion. He finished with 9.5/11, one point ahead of second-place finisher Samvel Ter-Sahakyan. In 2015, Steven graduated from the Massachusetts Institute of Technology, where he was a brother at the Phi Kappa Sigma fraternity.

In June 2018, Zierk earned his final GM norm by earning first place in the Charlotte Chess Center's Summer 2018 GM Norm Invitational held in Charlotte, North Carolina with an undefeated score of 6.5/9.

In 2019, Zierk tied for first place at the U.S. Masters Chess Championship.
