= Cristhian Cruz Sánchez =

Peruvian chess grandmaster (born 1992)

Cristhian Cruz
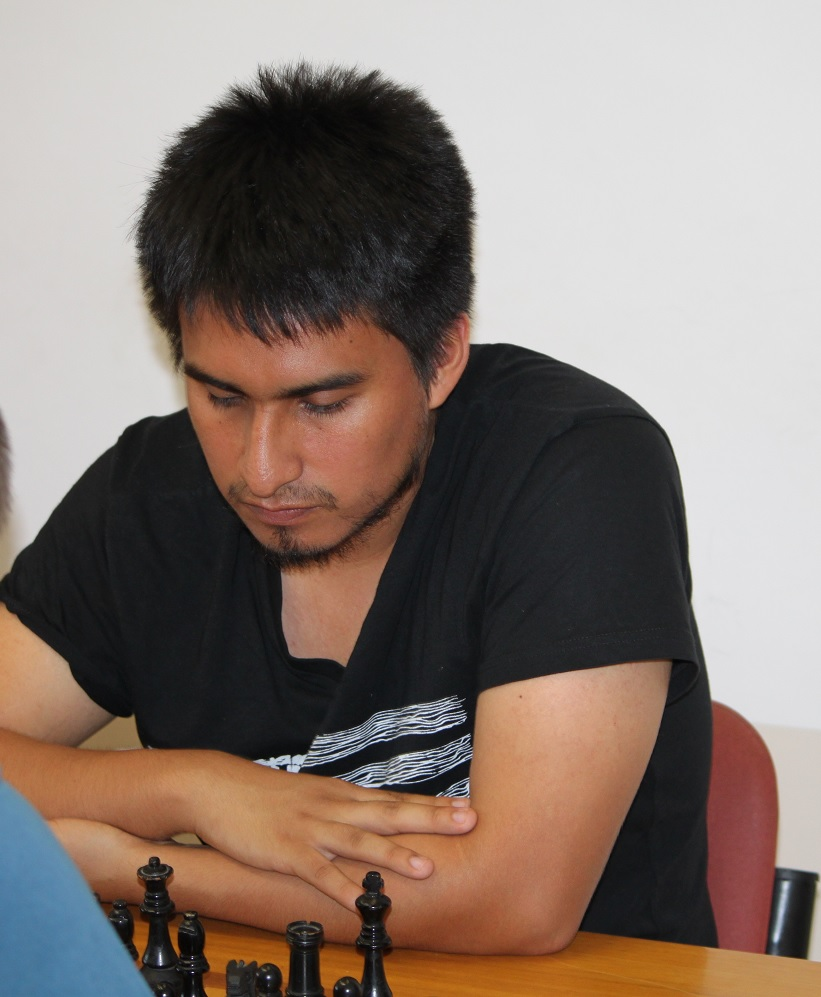
- Cruz in 2016

Personal information
- Born: 7 February 1992 (age 34) Lima, Peru

Chess career
- Country: Peru
- Title: Grandmaster (2012)
- FIDE rating: 2445 (July 2026)
- Peak rating: 2569 (September 2014)

Cristhian Cruz Sánchez (born 7 February 1992) is a Peruvian chess player who received the FIDE title of Grandmaster (GM) in September 2012.

== Biography ==
Three times Cruz won the medals of the Pan American Youth Chess Championships: gold (in 2004 in Bogotá - U12 age group), silver (in 2005 in Balneário Camboriú - U14 age group) and bronze (in 2003 in Bogotá - U12 age group).

In 2006, Cruz shared 1st place in Mislata and finished 2nd in Barcelona. In 2007, in Barcelona he won and shared the 2nd place three times independently. In 2009, Cristhian Cruz Sánchez shared the first place in Badalona and won in Mollet del Vallès and Zaragoza. In 2010, he finished 6th in the Porto Carras in World Youth Chess Championship in U18 age group. In 2011, Cristhian Cruz Sánchez won in Palma de Mallorca and in Mollet del Vallès. In 2012, he shared 1st place in Elgoibar. In 2014, Cristhian Cruz Sánchez shared the 1st place in Benasque.

Cruz played for Peru in the Chess Olympiads:

- In 2006, at fourth board in the 37th Chess Olympiad in Turin (+4, =2, -7),
- In 2016, at fourth board in the 42nd Chess Olympiad in Baku (+3, =4, -2),
- In 2018, at reserve board in the 43rd Chess Olympiad in Batumi (+4, =2, -3).

In 2008, he was awarded the FIDE International Master (IM) title and received the FIDE Grandmaster (GM) title four years later.

In November 2022, Cruz tied for 1st place at the 2022 U.S. Masters Chess Championship with a score of 7/9.
