= Brewington Hardaway =

American chess grandmaster (born 2009)

Personal information
- Born: April 22, 2009 (age 17) Bronx, New York, U.S.

Chess career
- Country: United States
- Title: Grandmaster (2025)
- FIDE rating: 2501 (July 2026)
- Peak rating: 2544 (December 2025)

Brewington Hardaway (born April 22, 2009) is an American chess grandmaster. He is the first U.S.-born African-American grandmaster. (Note: The first African-American grandmaster, GM Maurice Ashley, received the title in 1999 but was born in Jamaica.)

== Chess career ==
Hardaway was born to a Japanese mother and an African-American father. He began learning chess at age 4 from watching his older sister practicing the game. He holds the record for being the youngest African-American player to earn the USCF National Master title, earning the title at age 10.

In January 2023, Hardaway earned his first International Master (IM) norm at the NY City Winter IM Norm Invitational with a score of 6/9, and he earned his second by winning the Marshall Chess Club Winter IM Invitational the following month. In June 2023, he earned his final IM norm at the World Open, finishing with a score of 6/9 (including a win against GM Illya Nyzhnyk). Following the tournament, Hardaway's FIDE rating was 2390, 10 points shy of the requirements for the IM title.

In November 2023, Hardaway competed in the U.S. Masters Chess Championship. He scored 6/9, with 4 wins, 4 draws, and a loss. As a result, he both fulfilled the rating requirement for the IM title, and earned his first GM norm.

In January 2024, he earned his second GM norm at the NYC Chess Norms event. In August 2024, at the 2024 Sants Open, Hardaway qualified for his third and final GM norm at age 15. In November 2024, at the New York GM/IM Fall Invitational, Hardaway passed 2500 FIDE rating, meeting the requirements for the GM title.
