= Paul Kuroda (chess player) =

Japanese chess player (born 1954)

Paul M. Kuroda
Personal information
- Born: February 1954 (age 72) Little Rock, Arkansas

Chess career
- Country: Japan (after 1976); United States (before 1976)
- Title: FIDE Master
- Peak rating: 2330 (January 1983)

Paul M. Kuroda is an American-born Japanese chess player.

== Chess career ==
He won the Arkansas State Championship in 1974 and 1986.

In 1976, he played on board 2 for Japan in the 22nd Chess Olympiad and scored +4=4-3. He notably held a draw against Murray Chandler, who later became a grandmaster.

He won the U.S. Masters Chess Championship in 1984 with a score of 4/5 alongside Michael Brooks and Leonid Kaushansky.

He won the Japanese Chess Championship in 1985 alongside Gentaro Gonda.
