= UTRGV Chess =

University of Texas Rio Grande Valley Chess Program
- Type: University Chess Club
- Founded: August 31, 2015
- Location: Brownsville, Texas
- Region: Rio Grande Valley
- Country: United States
- Membership: About 100
- Affiliation: University of Texas Rio Grande Valley
- Website: University Webpage

The University of Texas Rio Grande Valley (UTRGV) Chess Program is one of the major chess organizations in the Rio Grande Valley and an affiliate of the United States Chess Federation (USCF). It consists of the Chess Team and Chess Club. The UTRGV Chess Club has approximately 100 members, which include grandmaster Anton Kovalyov, Andrey Stukopin, Carlos Hevia, Vladimir Belous, International Masters Félix Ynojosa, Guillermo Vazquez, Joshua Ruiz and Yannick Kambrath. The UTRGV Chess Team is coached by Polish grandmaster Bartłomiej Macieja. The Chess Club provides students ranging from beginner to expert a place for them to improve their game. UTRGV Chess competes at the state, national and international levels. They also help promote chess around local communities.

== Organization ==
The UTRGV Chess Team faculty consist of Head Coach grandmaster Bartłomiej Macieja, Program Coordinator grandmaster Aleksander Miśta, and Dr. Douglas Stoves. The UTRGV Chess Club faculty consists of Dr. Nancy Razo and President Manuel Gonzalez.

== History ==
UTRGV Chess was established August 31, 2015.

== National championships ==
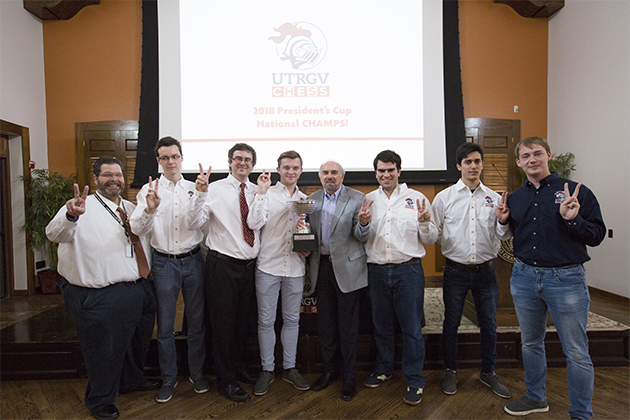

In 2018 the UTRGV Chess Team won its first national championship defeating the 5-time reigning national champs Webster University. In 2019, the UTRGV Chess Team successfully defended its title to win once again. In 2019, they also won the 2019 National Collegiate Rapid Chess Championship

== Awards and honors ==
Proclamation of the City of Brownsville, Texas November, 2019
Chess College of the Year August, 2019
The State of Texas Governor Recognition May, 2019
The Texas State Senate Resolution May, 2019
The Texas House of Representatives Resolution May, 2019
UT Board of Regents Recognition May, 2019
Chess College of the Year August, 2018
Proclamation of the Hidalgo County May, 2018
Proclamation of the City of Brownsville, Texas May, 2018
Proclamation by City of Edinburg, Texas April, 2018
Letter from Senator Ted Cruz March, 2018
Letter from Congressman Vicente Gonzalez January, 2018
Proclamation of The City Commission of Brownsville TX Spring, 2016
The Texas House of Representatives Resolution Fall, 2015
The Texas State Senate Proclamation Fall, 2015
The US Chess Federation named Brownsville as the 2014 Chess City of the Year 2014
Accomplishments UTB - Legacy Institution 2002-2015

== Team tournaments ==
| Name | Location | Date | Result |
|---|---|---|---|
| Texas Collegiate Super Finals | Richardson, TX | Oct 19–20, 2019 | 1st |
| Chess President's Cup (Final Four) | New York, NY | Apr 6–7, 2019 | 1st |
| U.S. Collegiate Blitz Chess Championship | St. Louis, MO | Mar 17, 2019 | 2nd |
| U.S. Collegiate Rapid Chess Championship | St. Louis, MO | Mar 16, 2019 | 1st |
| Southwest Collegiate Chess Championship | Plano, TX | Feb 23, 2019 | 1st |
