= Yuri González Vidal =

Cuban chess grandmaster (born 1981)

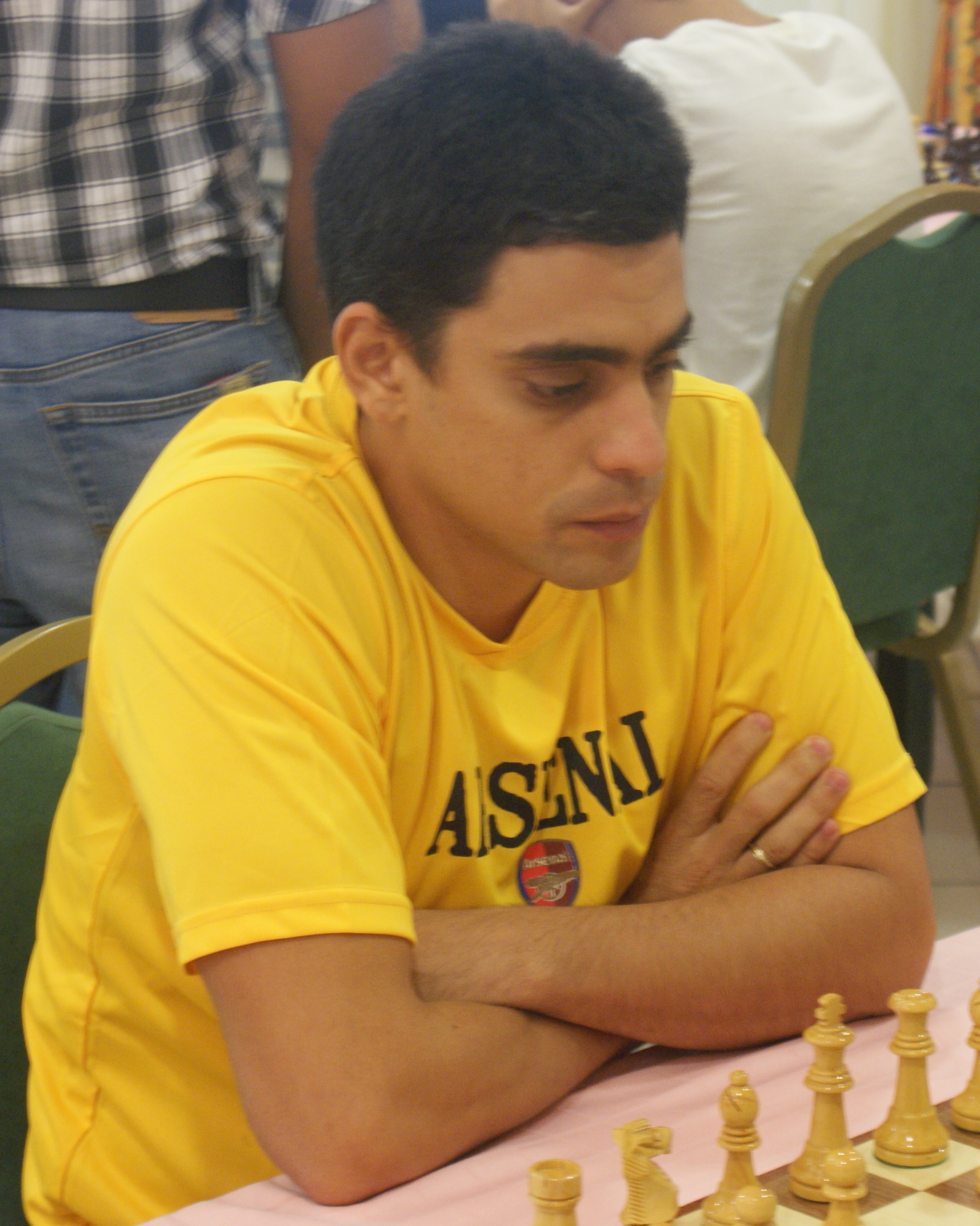
- González at the 2011 Andorra Open

Personal information
- Born: 12 January 1981 (age 45) Marianao, Cuba

Chess career
- Country: Cuba
- Title: Grandmaster (2008)
- FIDE rating: 2530 (July 2026)
- Peak rating: 2567 (April 2019)

Yuri González Vidal (born 12 January 1981) is a Cuban chess player. He received the FIDE title of Grandmaster (GM) in November 2008. González Vidal competed in the FIDE World Cup in 2017. In team events, he has represented Cuba in the Chess Olympiad in 2014 and the World Team Chess Championship in 2015.

In 2018, Gonzalez tied for first place at the U.S. Masters Chess Championship.
