= Victor Frias Pablaza =

Chilean-American chess player (1956–2005)

Victor Frias
Personal information
- Born: Victor Jaime Frias Apablaza; 10 February 1956 Santiago, Chile
- Died: 15 January 2005 (aged 48) Yonkers, New York

Chess career
- Country: Chile
- Title: International Master (1982)
- Peak rating: 2530 (January 1997)

Victor Jaime Frias Apablaza (10 February 1956 – 15 January 2005) was a Chilean chess International Master (IM) (1982), three-time Chilean Chess Championship medalist (1975, 1976, 1977).

== Biography ==
From the mid-1970s to the mid-1980s, Frias was one of Chile's leading chess players. He was multiple participant in Chilean Chess Championships. Best results: 1977 - 2nd place, in 1975 and 1976 - 3rd place. Victor Frias Pablaza studied at University of Chile in the Faculty of Architecture. In 1979 he moved to Los Angeles.

Frias played for Chile in the Chess Olympiads:

- In 1976, at third board in the 22nd Chess Olympiad in Haifa (+4, =2, -3),
- In 1978, at second board in the 23rd Chess Olympiad in Buenos Aires (+3, =7, -1),
- In 1982, at second board in the 25th Chess Olympiad in Lucerne (+5, =5, -2),
- In 1984, at first board in the 26th Chess Olympiad in Thessaloniki (+4, =5, -3).

Frias was known as a chess trainer. He coached Mexico National Chess Team from 1996 to 1997 and the USA Junior Chess Team from 1988 to 2003. Among his students are American grandmasters Patrick Wolff, Ilya Gurevich, as well as two-time US chess champion, grandmaster Jennifer Shahade. In 2004 Victor Frias Apablaza became one of the 35 best chess players in the United States. At his peak, he had a fide rating over 2500.

Frias died on January 15, 2005, after a short illness.
