= Dmitry Gurevich =

American chess grandmaster (born 1956)

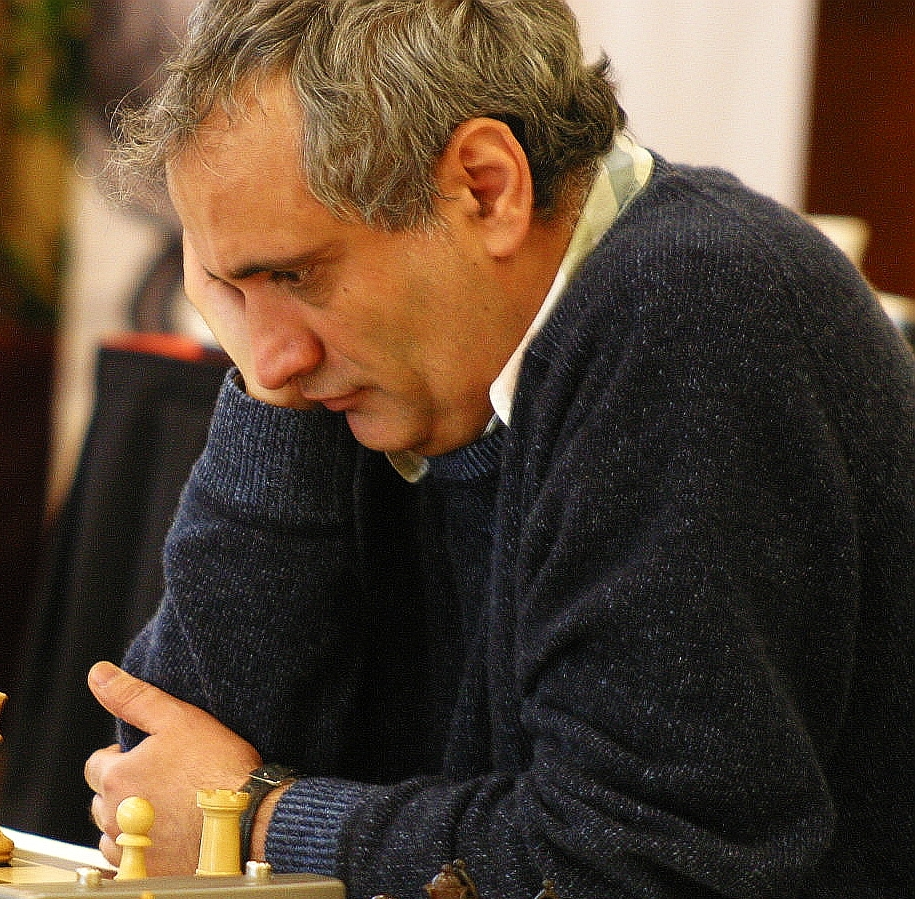
- Gurevich in 2006

Personal information
- Born: September 11, 1956 (age 70) Moscow, Russian SFSR, Soviet Union

Chess career
- Country: United States (after 1980); Soviet Union (before 1980)
- Title: Grandmaster (1983)
- Peak rating: 2580 (January 1997)
- Peak ranking: No. 36 (January 1984)

Dmitry Borisovich Gurevich (Russian: Дмитрий Гуревич; born September 11, 1956) is an American chess player who holds the FIDE title of Grandmaster.

Born in Moscow, Gurevich emigrated to New York City in 1980 and earned the Grandmaster (GM) title three years later. Gurevich has tied or won the U.S. Open four times (in 1988, 1994, 2009, and 2012). Also, Gurevich has had especially good results at the National Open in Las Vegas, sharing first place on numerous occasions, e.g. 1985, 1986, 1990, 1991, 1996, 1997, and 2005. He has won the U.S. Masters Chess Championship twice - in 1996 with a perfect 7.0/7 score, and equal first in 1997. Gurevich was a regular finisher at the top of North American events as well as a regular participant in the U.S. Invitational Championship.
