= Giorgi Margvelashvili (chess player) =

Georgian chess grandmaster (born 1990)

Personal information
- Born: February 9, 1990 (age 36)

Chess career
- Country: Georgia
- Title: Grandmaster (2010)
- FIDE rating: 2522 (July 2026)
- Peak rating: 2582 (October 2012)

Giorgi Margvelashvili (Georgian: გიორგი მარგველაშვილი; born 9 February 1990) is a Georgian chess player who earned the grandmaster title in 2010.

Margvelashvili won the 2006 (equal first) and 2012 (clear first) U.S. Masters Chess Championships.

== See also ==
- 2008 in chess
- European Youth Chess Championship
