= Hovhannes Gabuzyan =

Armenian chess grandmaster (born 1995)

Personal information
- Born: May 19, 1995 (age 31) Yerevan, Armenia

Chess career
- Country: Armenia
- Title: Grandmaster (2012)
- FIDE rating: 2553 (July 2026)
- Peak rating: 2622 (July 2019)

Hovhannes Gabuzyan (Armenian: Հովհաննես Գաբուզյան, born May 19, 1995, in Yerevan) is an Armenian chess player who received the FIDE title of Grandmaster (GM) in September 2012. He won the 77th Armenian Chess Championship in 2017 and 81st Armenian Chess Championship in 2021.

== Achievements ==
- 2010: Olympic Champion U-16 in the Armenia National team,
- 2011: Second in Armenia National team at U-16 World Youth Chess Olympiad,
- 2011: Second at European Youth Chess Championship (U-16)
- 2012: Second at European Youth Chess Championship (U-18)
- 2012: Became Chess Grandmaster at the age of 17.
- 2012: Second at World Youth Chess Championship U18, Maribor, Slovenia.
- 2013: Second at European Youth Chess Championship,
- 2013: Third at Karen Asrian Memorial
- 2014: First at 75th Armenian Ch. 1st League,
- 2014: First at 2014 Grand Europe Cup Golden Sands,
- 2014: First at Varna Open
- 2015: Champion at Bulgarian Chess Summer 2015, Golden Sands A Tournament,
- 2016: Won the World University Chess Championship
- 2017: Champion at Armenian National Championship, Highest League.
- 2017–2018: Member of Armenian National Chess Team.
- 2018: First in UTRGV Chess team at President Cup, Final Four tournament. New-York, US.
- 2018: Champion at 7th Annual Washington International.
- 2018: First at 2018 U.S. Masters Chess Championship,
- 2018: Winner in UTRGV chess team at Texas Collegiate Superfinals 2018,
- 2018: Champion at Fall Chess Classis B 2018, Saint Louis,
- 2018: Winner at Kings Island Open 2018
- 2019: Champion at 10th Annual Southwest Class Championship 2019, Dallas TX,
- 2019:Champion in UTRGV Chess Team at Final Four College Chess 2019, President's Cup, New-York,
- 2019: Second at 28th Annual Chicago Open 2019,
- 2019: Second at 2019 National Open, Las-Vegas,
- 2019: Second at 2019 Summer Chess Classic B, Saint-Louis,
- 2019: Second at 14th Poti N.Alexandria Cup,
- 2019: First at 2019 U.S. Masters Chess Championship,
- 2019: Second at 85th Annual Southwest Open,
- 2019: Champion at 29th Annual North American Open, Las-Vegas,
- 2021: Champion at Armenian National Championship, Highest League
