= Gleb Dudin =

Russian-Hungarian chess grandmaster (born 2004)

Personal information
- Born: October 11, 2004 (age 21) Moscow, Russia

Chess career
- Country: Russia (until 2023); Hungary (since 2023)
- Title: Grandmaster (2023)
- FIDE rating: 2583 (October 2026)
- Peak rating: 2596 (January 2026)

Gleb Evgenievich Dudin is a Russian-Hungarian chess grandmaster. He is currently studying at the University of Texas Rio Grande Valley.

== Chess career ==
In September 2023, he was a co-leader (alongside grandmasters Marc'Andria Maurizzi and Santiago Avila Pavas) after the seventh round of the U20 World Junior Chess Championship. He ultimately finished in 9th place in the championship.

In February 2024, he won the 15th Southwest Class Tournament in Irving, Texas with a score of 7/9 and defeating strong grandmasters John M. Burke and Christopher Yoo.

In March 2024, he played for the University of Texas Rio Grande Valley team in the Collegiate Chess League, where he put in the strongest performance for his team.

In December 2025, he won the Hungarian Chess Championship with a score of 6½/9, half a point ahead of Benjámin Gledura and Tamás Bánusz.
