= John M. Burke =

American chess grandmaster (born 2001)

Personal information
- Born: John Michael Burke; July 1, 2001 (age 25) Neptune City, New Jersey

Chess career
- Country: United States
- Title: Grandmaster (2018)
- FIDE rating: 2569 (October 2026)
- Peak rating: 2604 (September 2023)

John Michael Burke (born July 1, 2001) is an American chess player who holds the FIDE title of Grandmaster (GM). A chess prodigy, Burke reached an Elo rating of 2603 in September 2015. At the time, this made him the youngest-ever player to reach a rating of 2600 or above, a record since broken by Turkish GM Yağız Kaan Erdoğmuş.

== Chess career ==
=== 2015–2020 ===
Burke achieved the FIDE Master (FM) title in August 2015, and the International Master (IM) title in April 2016. He was awarded his Grandmaster (GM) title in April 2018.

In January 2018, Burke earned his final GM norm by tying for first place with GM Denis Kadrić in the Charlotte Chess Center's Winter 2018 GM Norm Invitational held in Charlotte, North Carolina, with an undefeated score of 6.5/9. In November 2018, Burke tied for first place at the U.S. Masters Chess Championship.

=== 2020–present ===
In October 2020, Burke won the U.S. Junior Championship.

In July 2021, Burke tied for first with GM Hans Niemann in the World Open, ultimately placing second on tiebreaks.

In April 2023, Burke was a part of the Webster University team that won the President's Cup, its sixth national title.

== Personal life ==
Burke holds a degree in English from Webster University.
