= Millionaire Chess =

American chess event organiser (2014–16)

Millionaire Chess was a company which organised the Millionaire Chess Open chess tournament. The tournament was associated with grandmaster Maurice Ashley. The 2014 iteration of the tournament featured a $1,000,000 prize fund, the largest for an open tournament at the time. Low participation, with 400 out of a desired 1000 participants, and an inability to cover the costs of the competition, led to the third iteration in 2016 being the last running of the tournament.

== Events ==
=== Millionaire Chess Open #1 ===
The first Millionaire Chess Open took place from October 9–13, 2014 and was held at Planet Hollywood Resort & Casino in Las Vegas, Nevada. The tournament consisted of six sections, Open, Under 2200, Under 2000, Under 1800, Under 1600, and Under 1400. Unrated and provisionally rated players (players with less than 26 lifetime games in any recognized rating system) were only allowed in the Open and U2200 sections. The tournament used players highest rating ever achieved starting from December 1, 2013, the date in which Millionaire #1 was announced, in order to prevent sandbagging. The winner of the Open section and recipient of the highest prize of $100,000 was Grandmaster Wesley So, who defeated Grandmaster Ray Robson during the final round of Millionaire Monday. The third-place winner was Yu Yangyi who defeated compatriot Zhou Jianchao in the third place playoff. The prize fund also consisted of $40,000 for the 1st-place finishers in the U2200, U2000, U1800, and U1600 sections and $24,000 for the U1400 section.

=== Millionaire Chess Open #2 ===
The second edition of the tournament took place from 8–12 October 2015 at the same location. The second edition changed the structure slightly. The U1400 and U1600 sections were merged into one and an unrated/provisional section was added. Players had to have played 50 games under a recognized rating system to play in any section other than the Open and unrated/provisional sections. Player's highest rating from December 1, 2013, and the time they registered was used to prevent sandbagging. The winner of the Open section and recipient of the highest prize of $100,000 was grandmaster Hikaru Nakamura who defeated grandmaster Lê Quang Liêm in the final round of Millionaire Monday. The third-place winner was Yu Yangyi once more after defeating Aleksandr Lenderman in the third place playoff.

=== Millionaire Chess Open #3 ===
On February 1, 2016, it was announced that the third edition of the tournament would take place from October 6–11 at Harrah's Resort in Atlantic City. The winner of the Open section and recipient of the highest prize of $30,000 was grandmaster Dariusz Świercz who defeated grandmaster Gawain Jones in the final round of Millionaire Monday. This also rendered as the last event of Millionaire Chess Open.
