= Gregory Kaidanov =

Ukrainian-American chess grandmaster (born 1959)

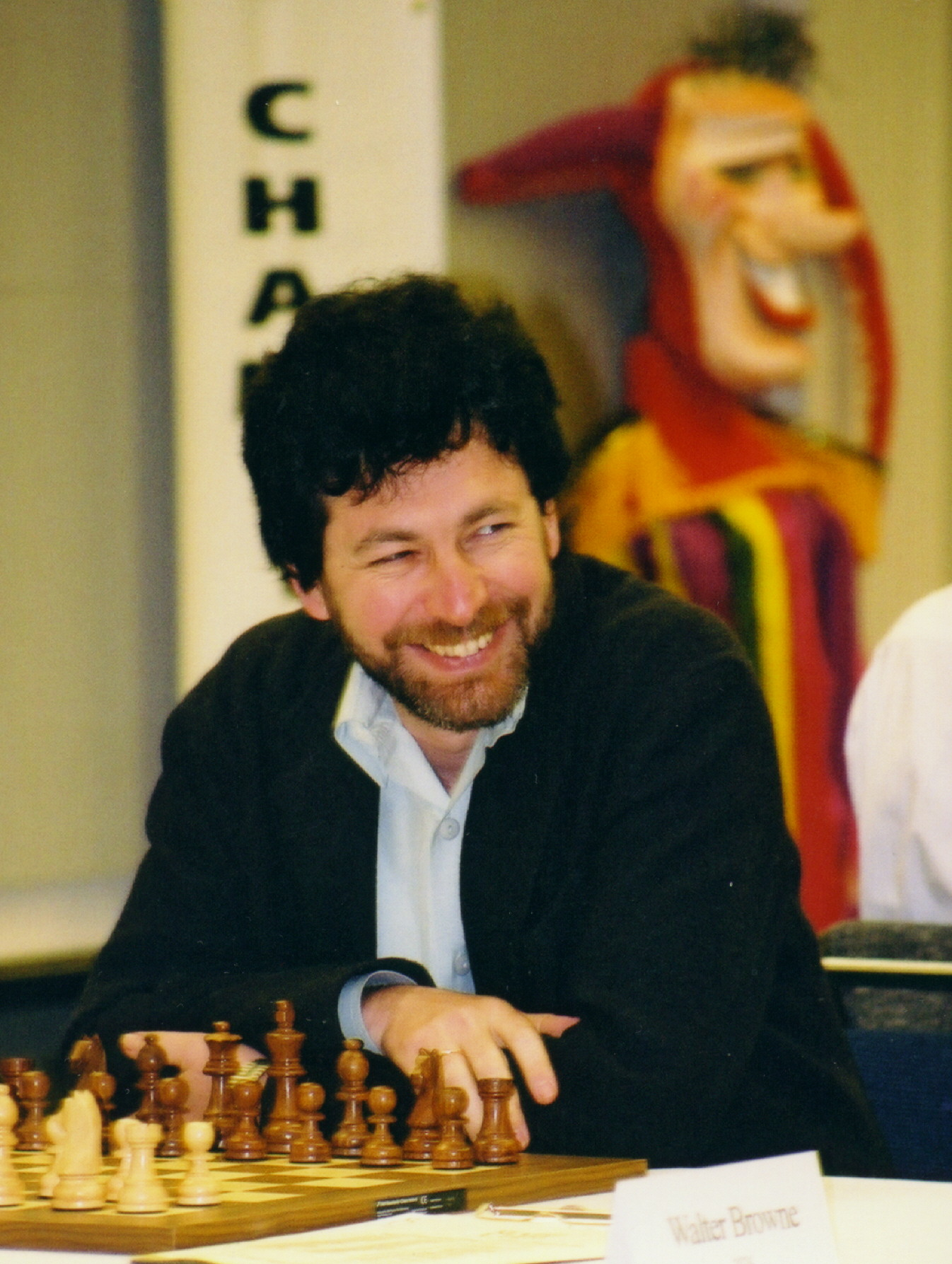
- Kaidanov in Seattle, 2002

Personal information
- Born: 11 October 1959 (age 67) Berdychiv, Ukrainian SSR, Soviet Union

Chess career
- Country: Soviet Union (until 1991); United States (since 1991)
- Title: Grandmaster (1988)
- FIDE rating: 2480 (October 2026)
- Peak rating: 2646 (October 2002)
- Peak ranking: No. 16 (July 1994)

Gregory Kaidanov (Russian: Григорий Зиновьевич Кайда́нов, Grigoriy Zinovyevich Kaydanov; born 11 October 1959) is a Soviet-born American chess grandmaster. He was inducted into the United States Chess Hall of Fame in 2013.

== Biography and chess career ==
Kaidanov is the head coach of the United States Chess School and teaches at the grandmaster level.

=== Career highlights ===
- 1972 – Boys under-14 Russian Federation Championship – 1st place
- 1975 – achieved Candidate of Master (analog of expert in US) title
- 1978 – achieved National Master title
- 1987 – achieved International Master title
- 1988 – achieved Grandmaster title and tied for first at a strong international tournament in Belgrade
- 1992 – won World Open Chess Championship
- 1992 – won US Open Chess Championship
- 1993 – won World Team Chess Championship as a member of US team
- 1998 – silver medal in 1998 Chess Olympiad as a member of US team
- 2001 – won North American Open Chess Championship
- 2002 – won Aeroflot Open (over 81 other grandmasters), tied for first place at the U.S. Masters Chess Championship.
- 2008 – won the Gausdal Classic, held 8–16 April in Gausdal, Norway, scoring 7/9
- 2021 – won the US championship for senior players

== Notable games ==
- Gregory Kaidanov vs. Viswanathan Anand, Moscow 1987, Caro–Kann Defense: Panov Attack (B13), 1–0
- Gregory Kaidanov vs. Evgeny Bareev, Ch URS (1 liga) 1987, Vienna Game: Stanley, Frankenstein–Dracula Variation (C27), 1–0
- Mark Taimanov vs. Gregory Kaidanov, Belgrade 1988, English Opening: Agincourt Defense, Wimpey System (A13), 0–1
- Benjamin Finegold vs. Gregory Kaidanov, 12th Chicago Open 2003, Semi-Slav Defense: Stoltz Variation (D45), 0–1

== See also ==
- List of Jewish chess players
