= Alexander Shabalov =

American chess grandmaster (born 1967)

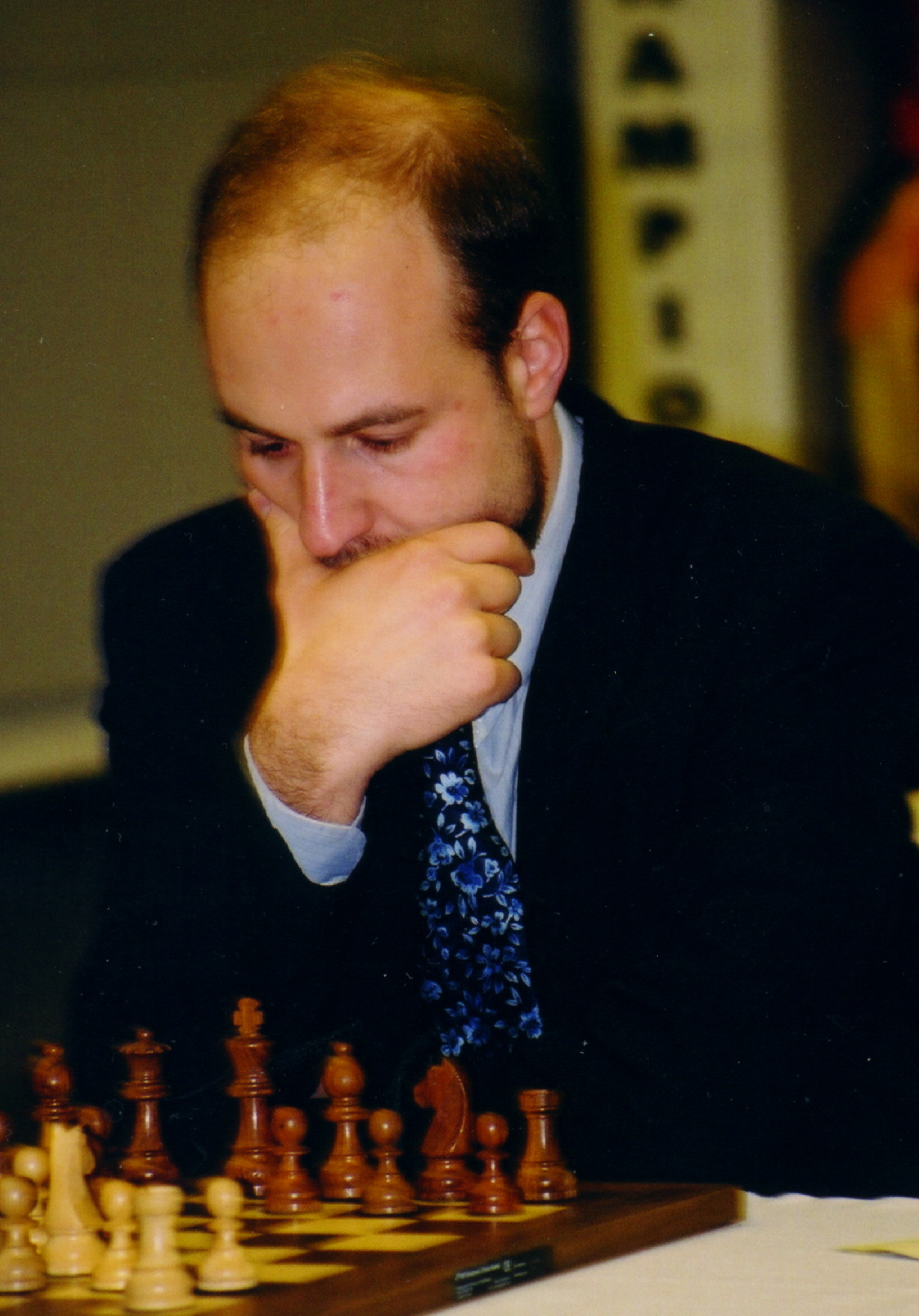
- Shabalov at the 2002 U.S. Chess Championships

Personal information
- Born: September 12, 1967 (age 59) Riga, Latvian SSR, Soviet Union

Chess career
- Country: Soviet Union (until 1991); Latvia (1992–1994); United States (since 1994)
- Title: Grandmaster (1991)
- FIDE rating: 2406 (October 2026)
- Peak rating: 2645 (July 1998)
- Peak ranking: No. 29 (July 1998)

Alexander Anatolyevich Shabalov (Russian: Алекса́ндр Анато́льевич Шаба́лов; Latvian: Aleksandrs Šabalovs; born September 12, 1967) is an American chess grandmaster and a four-time winner of the United States Chess Championship (1993, 2000, 2003, 2007). He also won or tied for first place seven times in the U.S. Open Chess Championship (1993, 1999, 2003, 2007, 2008, 2015, 2016).

== Chess career ==
Shabalov was born in Riga, Latvia, and was known during much of his career for courting complications even at the cost of objective soundness, much like his fellow Latvians Mikhail Tal and Alexei Shirov. He has transitioned to a more conservative and positional playing style as of 2019.

In 1997 and 2000, Shabalov tied for first place at the U.S. Masters Chess Championship. In 2002, he tied for first place at the Aeroflot Open in Moscow with Gregory Kaidanov, Alexander Grischuk, Aleksej Aleksandrov, and Vadim Milov. In 2009, Shabalov shared first place with Fidel Corrales Jimenez in the American Continental Chess Championship.

Shabalov regularly lectured chess players of all ages at the House of Chess, a store he ran at Ross Park Mall in Pittsburgh, Pennsylvania, until it closed in mid-2007.

In 2015 he was inducted into the U.S. Chess Hall of Fame.

In 2019, Shabalov won the 23rd annual Eastern Chess Congress.

In 2020, Shabalov won the 52nd annual Liberty Bell Open.

Shabalov won the 2022 U.S. Senior Championship, defeating Grandmaster Larry Christiansen in the final round of the tournament to claim victory.

In 2024, Shabalov won the over-50 category of the World Senior Chess Championship.

== Notable games ==
- Alexey Shirov vs Alexander Shabalov, Rapidplay 2001, Spanish Game: Schliemann Defense, Dyckhoff Variation (C63), 0-1
- Alexander Shabalov vs Varuzhan Akobian, US Championships 2003 2003, French Defense: Advance, Lputian Variation (C02), 1-0
- Alexander Shabalov vs John Fedorowicz, US Championships 2003 2003, Benko Gambit: Accepted, Pawn Return Variation (A57), 1-0

Achievements
Preceded by Patrick Wolff	United States Chess Champion; 1993 (with Alex Yermolinsky)	Succeeded by Boris Gulko
Preceded by Boris Gulko	United States Chess Champion; 2000-2001 (with Joel Benjamin and Yasser Seirawan)	Succeeded by Larry Christiansen
Preceded by Larry Christiansen	United States Chess Champion; 2003–2004	Succeeded by Hikaru Nakamura
Preceded by Alexander Onischuk	United States Chess Champion; 2007	Succeeded by Yuri Shulman
