= Fidel Corrales Jimenez =

Cuban-American chess grandmaster (born 1987)

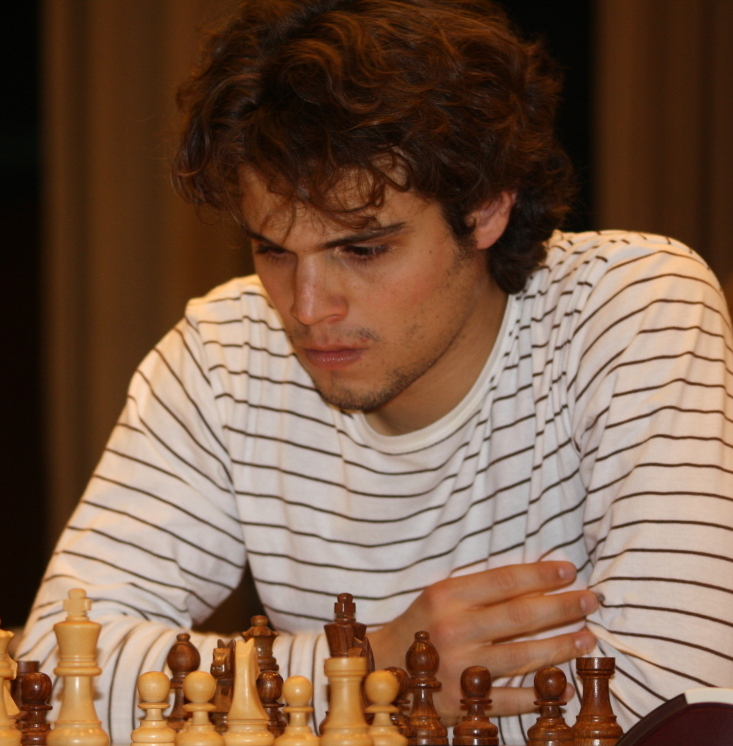
- Jimenez in 2009

Personal information
- Born: July 7, 1987 (age 39) Pinar del Rio, Cuba

Chess career
- Country: Cuba (until 2014); United States (since 2014)
- Title: Grandmaster (2009)
- FIDE rating: 2507 (July 2026)
- Peak rating: 2617 (December 2012)

Fidel Corrales Jimenez (born July 7, 1987) is a Cuban-American chess grandmaster.

== Chess career ==
In 2009 Jimenez shared first place with Alexander Shabalov in the American Continental Chess Championship.

He played in the Chess World Cup 2009 and Chess World Cup 2011, in both cases representing the Cuban Chess Federation, being defeated by Alexander Areshchenko and Judit Polgár, respectively, in the first rounds. In 2023, Jimenez won the World Chess Open in Philadelphia.

== Personal life ==
His sister is Zenia Corrales Jiménez.
