= Sergey Erenburg =

Israeli-American chess grandmaster (born 1983)

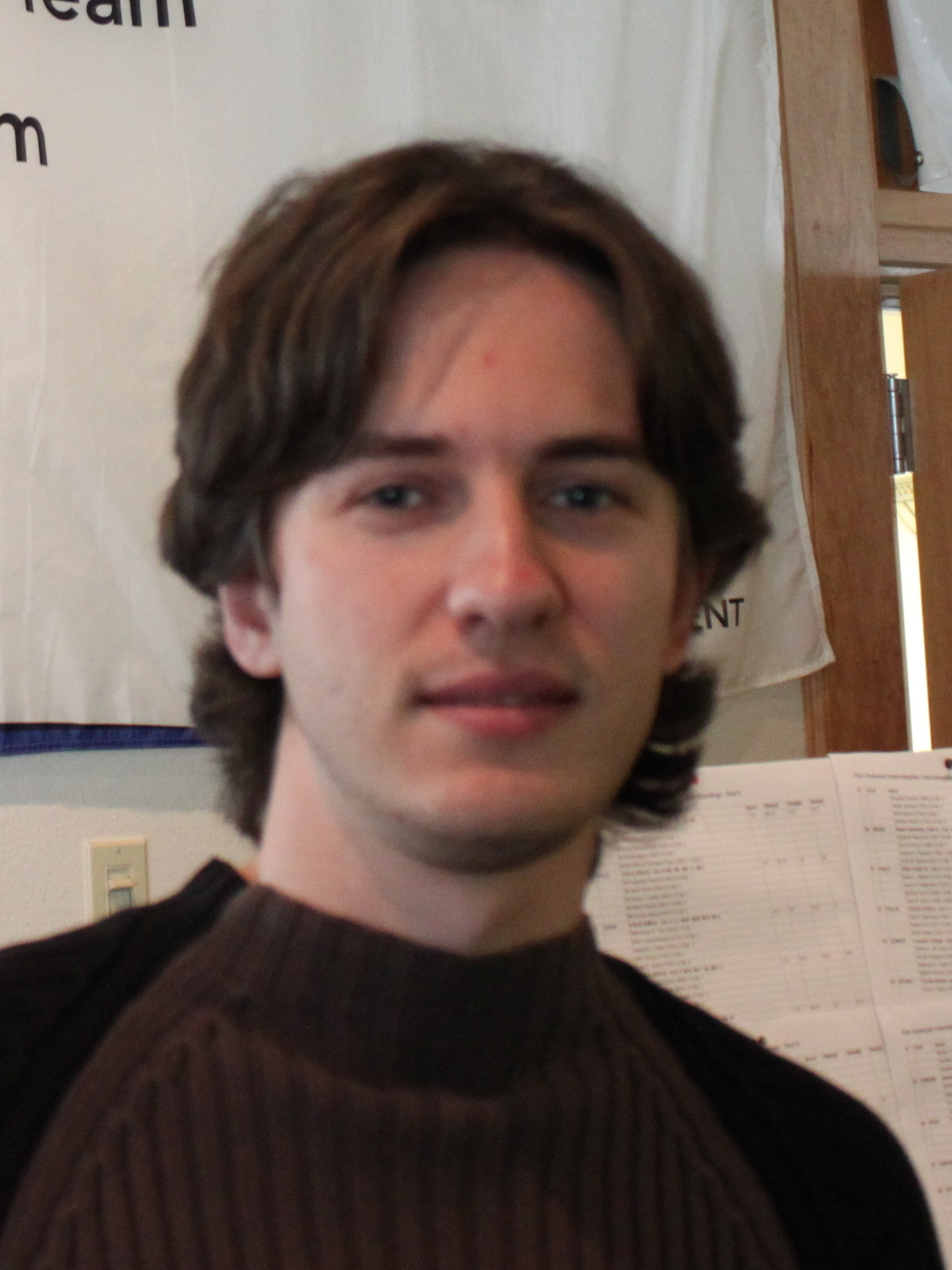
- Erenburg in 2009

Personal information
- Native name: סרגיי אירנבורג
- Born: January 27, 1983 (age 43) Biysk, Soviet Union

Chess career
- Country: Israel (until 2013); United States (since 2013)
- Title: Grandmaster (2003)
- FIDE rating: 2475 (November 2026)
- Peak rating: 2637 (December 2012)

Sergey Erenburg (Hebrew: סרגיי אירנבורג; born January 27, 1983) is an American chess player who has been a Grandmaster since 2003 and an International master since 2002. He is ranked 24th in the US, and 409th in the world. His highest rating was 2637 (in December 2012).

He won 1st place in the 8th Chesapeake open in 2016 with a score of 6.5/7 and won the Virginia State Championship in 2023–2024, with a perfect 6/6 score. In 2018, Erenburg tied for first place at the U.S. Masters Chess Championship.
