= Mikhail Antipov =

Russian-American chess grandmaster (born 1997)

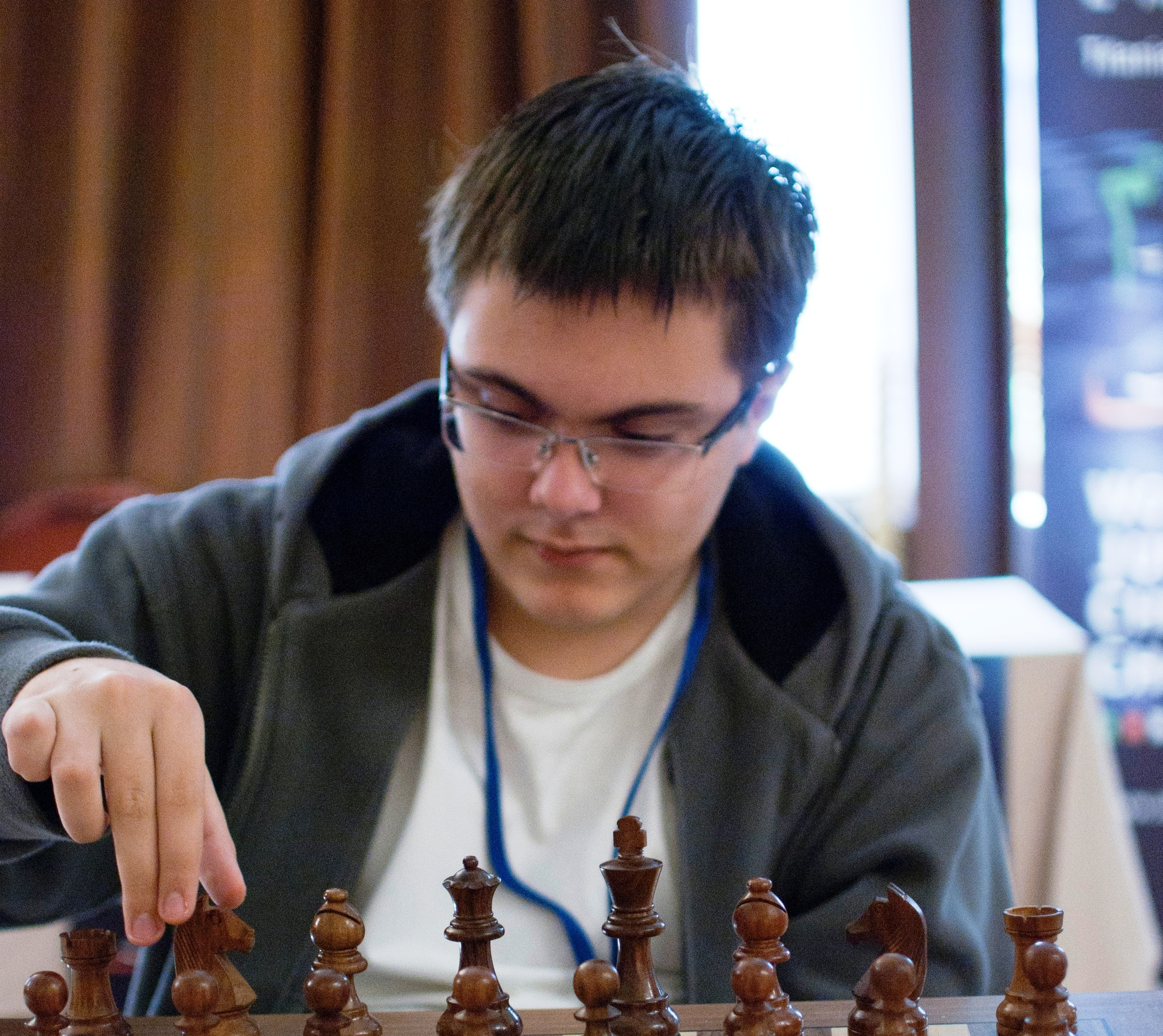
- Mikhail Antipov in 2012

Personal information
- Born: Mikhail Aleksandrovich Antipov; 10 June 1997 (age 29) Moscow, Russia

Chess career
- Country: Russia (until 2024); United States (since 2024)
- Title: Grandmaster (2013)
- FIDE rating: 2633 (November 2026)
- Peak rating: 2633 (October 2026)
- Ranking: No. 88 (November 2026)
- Peak ranking: No. 88 (October 2026)

Mikhail Aleksandrovich Antipov (Russian: Михаил Александрович Антипов; born 10 June 1997) is a Russian chess grandmaster who represents the United States. He is also a FIDE Senior Trainer and a coach and trainer for the University of Texas at Dallas chess program.

== Chess career ==
At the age of 15, Antipov was awarded the title of Master of Sports of Russia. He earned his first grandmaster norm when he won the First Saturday tournament in December 2011, his second grandmaster norm at the international tournament in Sarajevo in May 2012, and achieved his third grandmaster norm at the Riga Technical University Open in August 2013, where he shared third place.

Antipov was officially awarded his grandmaster title in October 2013, which, at the age of 16, made him the youngest grandmaster in Russia at the time. In 2014, he was a bronze medalist in the Spain chess team championship. In 2015, Antipov won the under-20 World Junior Chess Championship, which was held in Khanty-Mansiysk.

In November 2022, Antipov tied for first place at the U.S. Masters Championship with a score of 7/9. In November 2023, he again scored 7/9 and won the U.S. Masters Championship on tiebreak.

While studying at the University of Missouri, Antipov played for the university's chess team. In 2024, he helped Missouri win its first President's Cup national collegiate chess championship. In the final round against Webster University, Antipov drew with Benjámin Gledura in the last game to finish and seal Missouri's 2½-1½ match victory. Missouri also won the Fall 2024 Collegiate Chess League championship, with Antipov and Aryan Tari among the team's leading players.

Antipov earned a bachelor's degree in economics from the University of Missouri in 2023 and a master's degree in finance in 2025.

=== Coaching roles ===
- 2024: Served as the main coach of the United States team at the 45th Chess Olympiad in Budapest, where the team won the silver medal, finishing second among 188 teams.
- Coached Grandmaster Fabiano Caruana in preparation for the U.S. Chess Championship.
- 2025-present: Coach and trainer for the University of Texas at Dallas chess program. Antipov joined the program in April 2025.
- 2026: Served as a coach when UT Dallas won its first Collegiate Chess League championship, defeating SRM Institute of Science and Technology 9½-6½ in the final.

=== Best results ===
- Bronze medalist, Spain Chess Team Championship Premier League (2014).
- Champion, Under-20 World Junior Chess Championship (2015).
- Champion, Swiss Rapid Chess Championship (2018, 2019).
- Silver medalist, Longtou Cup the Belt and Road Chess Open (2018).
- Champion, Netanya International Chess Festival (2019).
- Champion, Moscow City Chess Championship (2020).
- Champion, 2022 Summer Chess Classic - B.
- Champion, 50th Annual World Open (2022).
- Champion, U.S. Online Collegiate Blitz Championship (2022).
- Tied for first, U.S. Masters Championship (2022), scoring 7/9.
- Tied for 2nd place, Saint Louis Super Swiss (2023).
- Champion, 10th Cherry Blossom Classic - Open (2023).
- Champion, 1000GM Las Vegas Summer Super Swiss (2023).
- Champion, National Open (2023).
- Champion, 16th Annual Chicago Class - Masters (2023).
- Champion, 10th Annual Washington International - Championship (2023).
- Champion, U.S. Masters Championship (2023), scoring 7/9 and winning on tiebreak.
- Champion, 32nd Annual Kings Island Open - Major (2023).
- Tied for 2nd place, Spring Chess Classic - A (2024).
- Champion, 33rd Annual Chicago Open (2024).
- Champion, 150K Universal Open - Championship (2024).
- Tied for 2nd place, 52nd Annual World Open (2024).
- Champion, 3rd Annual Nashville Summer Classic - FIDE Championship (2024).
- Champion, 29th Annual Mid-America Open - Major (2025), scoring 5/5.
- Tied for 5th place, American Cup Blitz (2025), scoring 6/9 and winning the top under-2600 prize.
- Winner, Championship section, 80th Texas State and Amateur Championship (2025).
- Champion, Austin Summer Open - Championship (2025), scoring 5/5.
- Champion, 50th Annual Eastern Open - Premier (2025), scoring 7/8.
- Champion, Saint Louis Masters (2026), scoring 7½/9 and finishing half a point ahead of Fabiano Caruana.
- Co-champion, 81st Texas State and Amateur Championship (2026), scoring 5½/7.
- Tied for 2nd place, 3rd Annual Universal Open - Championship (2026), scoring 5½/7.
- Champion, 45th Open Internacional Villa de Benasque (2026), scoring 8/10 and winning on tiebreak.

== Personal life ==
Antipov is married to Woman International Master Irina Utyatskaya. He founded the North American Chess School, where Utyatskaya also teaches.
