= Vladimir Belous =

Russian chess grandmaster (born 1993)

Personal information
- Born: July 29, 1993 (age 32) Kamensk-Shakhtinsky, Russia

Chess career
- Country: Russia
- Title: Grandmaster (2013)
- FIDE rating: 2471 (July 2026)
- Peak rating: 2587 (May 2017)

Vladimir Belous (born July 29, 1993, in Kamensk-Shakhtinsky, Russia) is a chess Grandmaster from Moscow, Russia. He got International Master (IM) title in 2011 and Grandmaster (GM) title in 2013. He was the winner of 25th Annual Chicago Open in 2016 and U.S. Masters Chess Championship in 2017. In 2016, he moved to Brownsville TX, United States.

== Notable tournaments ==
Tournament Name	Year	ELO	Points
Saint Louis Congress GM (Saint Louis USA)	2022	2525	7.5
PNWCC WOW Open ( Redmond WA USA)	2021	2517	2.0
CCCSA Spring GM 2021 (Charlotte USA)	2021	2521	5.5
CCCSA Winter GM 2019 ( Charlotte USA)	2019	2533	5.0
Texas Collegiate Superfinal (Lubbock USA)	2018	2530	3.5
CCCSA Labor Day GM 2018 (Charlotte USA)	2018	2558	5.5
College Final Four 2018 (New York USA)	2018	2575	3.0
2nd UT-RGV GM Inv. 2016 (Brownsville USA )	2016	2556	7.0
ch-Moscow 2014 (Moscow RUS)	2014	2572	7.0
Victory Day 2012 (Moscow RUS)	2012	2518	5.5
10th Somov Memorial (Kirishi RUS)	2012	2518	8.5
Andranik Margaryan Memorial 2012 (Yerevan ARM)	2012	2522	7.5
