= Cleveland Open (chess) =

Chess tournament held in Ohio, US

The Cleveland Open is an annual chess tournament held in Cleveland, Ohio. The tournament was not held from 2004 until 2008, when it was resurrected.

== List of winners ==
Year	Winner(s)
1952	Lawrence Star
1953	Larry Lipking
1954	Igor Garais
1955	Mike Paruta
1956	Jean Cohn
1957	Richard Kause
1958	Pal Benko
1959	William Granger
1960	Tom Ellison
1961	Tom Wozney
1962	Richard Kause
1963	Jack Witeczek
1964	Richard Kause
1965	Richard Kause
1966	Richard Kause, Mike Paruta
1967	James Harkins, Tom Ellison
1968	Don Collins, R Michniak
1969	Milan Vukcevich
1970	Richard Noel, Tom Wozney
1971	Robert Burns Jr.
1972	Milan Vukcevich
1973	Robert Burns Jr.
1974	Calvin Blocker
1975	Calvin Blocker
1976	Robert Burns Jr.
1977	Calvin Blocker
1978	Calvin Blocker
1979	Tom Wozney, T Hannibal
1980	Andrew Zebrowski
1981	Alan Federl
1982	Dumitru Ghizdavu, Tom Ward
1983	Richard Costigan
1984	Igor Ivanov, Calvin Blocker
1985	Brian Hartman, David Glicksman
1986	Dmitry Gurevich
1987	Anatoly Lein
1988	Calvin Blocker
1989	Calvin Blocker
1990	Calvin Blocker, S Ramakrishnapillai
1991	
1992	David Presser, Kenneth Panzel
1993	Boris Men
1996	Dmitry Berkovich
2000	Calvin Blocker
2002	Calvin Blocker, Stanislav Kriventsov
2003	Stanislav Kriventsov
2008	Sergey Erenburg, Nikola Mitkov
2009	Alexander Shabalov
2010	Mark Paragua, Alexander Shabalov, Iryna Zenyuk
2011	Ardash Jayakumar, Atulya Shetty, Iryna Zenyuk
2012	Sergey Kudrin, John Miller, Bryan Smith
2013	Sergey Kudrin, Gopal Menon, Gabriel Petesch
2014	Jay Bonin, Ronald Burnett, Florin Felecan, Walker Griggs, Sergey Kudrin, Gabriel Petesch
2015	Jay Bonin
2016	Fidel Corrales Jimenez
2017	Mika Brattain
2018	Fidel Corrales Jimenez, Jay Bonin
2019	Mika Brattain, Gabriel Petesch
2020 (online)	Vladimir Belous, Eigen Wang, Eltaj Safarli
2021	Vladimir Belous
2022	Joshua Posthuma
2023	Safal Bora
2024	Bryan G. Smith
2025	Joshua Posthuma
