= United States Chess League =

Chess league in United States

United States Chess League (USCL)
- Sport: Chess
- Founded: 2005
- Founder: Greg Shahade
- Folded: 2016
- Replaced by: Professional Online Rapid Chess League
- Commissioner: Greg Shahade
- No. of teams: 20
- Country: United States
- Last champion: Manhattan Applesauce(1 title)
- Most titles: Dallas Destiny; New York Knights (2 titles)
- Website: http://uschessleague.com/

The United States Chess League (USCL) was the only nationwide chess league in the United States for eleven years. In 2016 the league announced it would be opened to cities from around the world, moved to the website chess.com, and renamed the Professional Rapid Online Chess League.

At its peak, the USCL comprised twenty teams, whose members included some of the highest-rated chess players in the United States. Participants in the last season included Wesley So, Alexander Onischuk, Alex Lenderman, Anton Kovalyov, Varuzhan Akobian, Daniel Naroditsky, Julio Becerra, Joel Benjamin, and many other grandmasters. The League was founded in 2005 by International Master Greg Shahade. In later seasons the league was run by Arun Sharma, who was the Vice President of the USCL.

== 2005 ==
The 2005 season began on August 30 and ended on November 23 with the Baltimore Kingfishers crushing the Miami Sharks to win the inaugural USCL title.

=== Team origins ===
The following teams were selected to play in the inaugural season.

Teams	Date Joined
San Francisco Mechanics	January 30
New York Knights	February 3
Philadelphia Masterminds	February 3
Baltimore Kingfishers	March 24
Dallas Destiny	March 30
Miami Sharks	April 23
Boston Blitz	April 25
Carolina Cobras	April 30

=== Standings ===
Eastern Division
	W	L	Game Points
New York Knights	8	2	25.5
Baltimore Kingfishers	6.5	3.5	24
Boston Blitz	4	6	18
Philadelphia Inventors	3.5	6.5	16

Western Division
	W	L	Game Points
San Francisco Mechanics	6	4	22
Miami Sharks	5.5	4.5	19.5
Dallas Destiny	3.5	6.5	18.5
Carolina Cobras	3	7	16.5

=== Playoffs ===
The top two teams from each division qualified for the playoffs.

Semifinals
E1	New York Knights	1.5
E2	Baltimore Kingfishers	2.5
W1	San Francisco Mechanics	1.5
W2	Miami Sharks	2.5

USCL Championship
E2	Baltimore Kingfishers	3.5
W2	Miami Sharks	0.5

=== All Stars ===
Spurce:

Team 1
	Player	Team
Board 1	Pascal Charbonneau	Baltimore Kingfishers
Board 2	Lev Milman	Carolina Cobras
Board 3	Gregory Braylovsky	New York Knights
Board 4	Elvin Wilson	Philadelphia Inventors

Team 2
	Player	Team
Board 1	Julio Becerra	Miami Sharks
Board 2	Tegshsuren Enkhba	Baltimore Kingfishers
Board 3	David Pruess	San Francisco Mechanics
Board 4	Katerina Rohonyan	Baltimore Kingfishers

== 2006 ==
The 2006 season began on August 30 and ended on November 29 as the San Francisco Mechanics defeated the New York Knights in the blitz tiebreaker to win the championship.

=== Expansion teams ===
On March 4, Shahade announced that two expansion teams, the Seattle Sluggers and the Tennessee Tempo, would join the league for the 2006 season making it then 10 teams. In addition, the Carolina Cobras moved to the Eastern Division in order to make space for the expansion teams.

=== Standings ===
Eastern Division
	W	L	Game Points
Boston Blitz	8	2	25.5
New York Knights	4.5	5.5	18.5
Carolina Cobras	4	6	19.5
Philadelphia Inventors	4	6	19
Baltimore Kingfishers	4	6	18.5

Western Division
	W	L	Game Points
San Francisco Mechanics	8.5	1.5	26
Seattle Sluggers	7	3	25.5
Dallas Destiny	4.5	5.5	21
Miami Sharks	4	6	18
Tennessee Tempo	1.5	8.5	8.5

=== Playoffs ===
The top three teams from each division qualified for the playoffs.

Wildcard
E2	New York Knights	3
E3	Carolina Cobras	1
W2	Seattle Sluggers	2*
W3	Dallas Destiny	2

Semifinals
E1	Boston Blitz	1
E2	New York Knights	3
W1	San Francisco Mechanics	3
W2	Seattle Sluggers	1

USCL Championship
E2	New York Knights	2
W1	San Francisco Mechanics	2**

*Advanced due to draw odds
**Won blitz tiebreaker

=== All Stars ===
Team 1
	Player	Team
Board 1	Julio Becerra	Miami Sharks
Board 2	Jacek Stopa	Dallas Destiny
Board 3	Oleg Zaikov	Carolina Cobras
Board 4	Sam Shankland	San Francisco Mechanics

Team 2
	Player	Team
Board 1	Josh Friedel	San Francisco Mechanics
Board 2	Vinay Bhat	San Francisco Mechanics
Board 3	Richard Costigan	Philadelphia Inventors
Board 4	Craig Jones	Carolina Cobras

== 2007 ==
The 2007 season began on August 27 and ended on November 28 with the Dallas Destiny defeated the Boston Blitz in the blitz tiebreaker.

=== Expansion teams ===
Two further expansion teams, the New Jersey Knockouts and the Queens Pioneers, joined the USCL. Moreover, the Philadelphia Masterminds changed their name to the Philadelphia Inventors while the Carolina Cobras moved back to the Western Division in order to make room for the expansion teams.

=== Standings ===
Eastern Division
	W	L	Game Points
Boston Blitz	7	3	23.5
Philadelphia Masterminds	6	4	20.5
New York Knights	5	5	19.5
New Jersey Knockouts	4.5	5.5	19.5
Queens Pioneers	4.5	5.5	19
Baltimore Kingfishers	4	6	18.5

Western Division
	W	L	Game Points
Dallas Destiny	7	3	23.5
San Francisco Mechanics	6	4	23.5
Miami Sharks	5	5	19
Seattle Sluggers	4.5	5.5	20.5
Carolina Cobras	4.5	5.5	19
Tennessee Tempo	2	8	14

=== Playoffs ===
The top three teams from each division qualified for the playoffs.

Wildcard
E2	Philadelphia Inventors	0.5
E3	New York Knights	3.5
W2	San Francisco Mechanics	1.5
W3	Miami Sharks	2.5

Semifinals
E1	Boston Blitz	2.5
E3	New York Knights	1.5
W1	Dallas Destiny	3.5
W3	Miami Sharks	0.5

USCL Championship
E1	Boston Blitz	2
W1	Dallas Destiny	2*

*Won blitz tiebreaker

=== All Stars ===
1st Team All Stars
	Player (Team)
Board 1	Julio Becerra (MIA)
Board 2	Jorge Sammour-Hasbun (BOS)
Board 3	Jacek Stopa (DAL)
Board 4	Iryna Zenyuk (NY)

2nd Team All Stars
	Player (Team)
Board 1	Joel Benjamin (NJ)
Board 2	Davorin Kuljasevic (DAL)
Board 3	Denys Shmelov (BOS)
Board 4	Chris Williams (BOS)

3rd Team All Stars
	Player (Team)
Board 1	Larry Christiansen (BOS)
Board 2	Vinay Bhat (SF)
Board 3	Jay Bonin (NY)
Board 4	Bayaraa Zorigt (DAL)

== 2008 ==
The 2008 season began on August 25 and ended on December 6 with a rematch of last years USCL Championship game. The Dallas Destiny successfully defended their title as they took down the Boston Blitz in another blitz tiebreaker.

=== Expansion teams ===
At the end of 2007, the league announced two additional teams for the 2007 season which were the Chicago Blaze and the Arizona Scorpions. Once again, the Carolina Cobras moved back to East to balance the Divisions.

=== Standings ===
Eastern Division
	W	L	Game Points
Carolina Cobras	7	3	24
Queens Pioneers	7	3	23.5
Boston Blitz	6	4	23
New York Knights	5	5	18
New Jersey Knockouts	4.5	5.5	20
Philadelphia Masterminds	2	8	15
Baltimore Kingfishers	1.5	8.5	14

Western Division
	W	L	Game Points
Miami Sharks	7	3	26.5
San Francisco Mechanics	6.5	3.5	23.5
Dallas Destiny	6.5	3.5	21
Seattle Sluggers	4.5	5.5	18
Arizona Scorpions	4.5	5.5	17.5
Chicago Blaze	4	6	19.5
Tennessee Tempo	4	6	16.5

=== Playoffs ===
The top four teams from each division qualified for the playoffs.

Quarterfinals
E1	Carolina Cobras	3.5
E4	New York Knights	0.5
Eastern
E2	Queens Pioneers	1.5
E3	Boston Blitz	2.5
W1	Miami Sharks	2.5
W4	Seattle Sluggers	1.5
Western
W2	San Francisco Mechanics	1.5
W3	Dallas Destiny	2.5

Semifinals
E1	Carolina Cobras	1.5
E3	Boston Blitz	2.5
W1	Miami Sharks	1
W3	Dallas Destiny	3

USCL Championship
E3	Boston Blitz	2
W3	Dallas Destiny	2*

*Won blitz tiebreaker

=== All Stars ===
1st Team All Stars
	Player (Team)
Board 1	Julio Becerra (MIA)
Board 2	Davorin Kuljasevic (DAL)
Board 3	Alex Lenderman (QNS)
Board 4	Bayaraa Zorigt (DAL)

2nd Team All Stars
	Player (Team)
Board 1	Sergey Erenburg (BAL)
Board 2	Slava Mikhailuk (SEA)
Board 3	Marc Esserman (BOS)
Board 4	Eric Rodriguez (MIA)

3rd Team All Stars
	Player (Team)
Board 1	Jaan Ehlvest (TEN)
Board 2	Tom Bartell (PHI)
Board 3	Sam Shankland (SF)
Board 4	Ilya Krasik (BOS)

== 2009 ==
The 2009 season began on August 31 and ended on December 7 with the New York Knights defeating the Miami Sharks in a blitz tiebreaker for the fourth straight season.

For the first time, the participating teams and divisions remained the same in the 2009 season with no expansion teams. One key rule change was the elimination of bonus rating points for female players, instead establishing a bonus roster spot for the team if at least one woman was on the roster.

This season would be the last season for the Tennessee Tempo as they were replaced by two expansion teams in the next season.

=== Standings ===
Eastern Division
	W	L	Game Points
New Jersey Knockouts	8	2	26
Boston Blitz	7.5	2.5	23.5
New York Knights	5	5	22
Baltimore Kingfishers	4.5	5.5	18.5
Philadelphia Masterminds	4	6	17.5
Queens Pioneers	3.5	6.5	17
Carolina Cobras	2	8	13.5

Western Division
	W	L	Game Points
Seattle Sluggers	7.5	2.5	23.5
San Francisco Mechanics	6.5	3.5	22.5
Arizona Scorpions	6	4	22.5
Miami Sharks	6	4	22
Chicago Blaze	4	6	18.5
Dallas Destiny	3.5	6.5	18.5
Tennessee Tempo	2	8	16

=== Playoffs ===
The top four teams from each division qualified for the playoffs.

Quarterfinals
E1	New Jersey Knockouts	3
E4	Baltimore Kingfishers	1
Eastern
E2	Boston Blitz	1.5
E3	New York Knights	2.5
W1	Seattle Sluggers	0.5
W4	Miami Champions	3.5
Western
W2	San Francisco Mechanics	3.5
W3	Arizona Scorpions	0.5

Semifinals
E1	New Jersey Knockouts	1.5
E3	New York Knights	2.5
W4	Miami Sharks	2.5
W3	San Francisco Mechanics	1.5

USCL Championship
E3	New York Knights	2*
W4	Miami Sharks	2

- Won blitz tiebreaker

=== All Stars ===
1st Team All Stars
	Player (Team)
Board 1	Hikaru Nakamura (SEA)
Board 2	Boris Gulko (NJ)
Board 3	Angelo Young (CHC)
Board 4	Eric Rodriguez (MIA)

2nd Team All Stars
	Player (Team)
Board 1	Julio Becerra (MIA)
Board 2	Dean Ippolito (NJ)
Board 3	Andrei Zaremba (QNS)
Board 4	Yaacov Norowitz (NY)

3rd Team All Stars
	Player (Team)
Board 1	Alex Stripunsky (QNS)
Board 2	Pascal Charbonneau (NY)
Board 3	Marc Esserman (BOS)
Board 4	Yian Liou (SF)

== 2010 ==
The 2010 season began on August 23 and ended on November 20 with the New England Nor'easters nearly capping off a perfect season as they crushed the Miami Sharks.

This season featured the expansion team from New England which shattered many records such as becoming the first expansion team to have a winning record and make the playoffs since the Sluggers did back in 2006, the best regular season record in 2010, and having the best record in USCL history (9.5-0.5), drawing only with their local competitors, the Boston Blitz.

The rules were also changed to eliminate alternates, favoring instead another permanent roster spot, increasing the size to nine, or ten if at least one woman is on the team.

=== Expansion teams ===
The league expanded from fourteen to sixteen teams this year, with the addition of three new teams which were the St. Louis Arch Bishops, the Los Angeles Vibe, and the New England Nor'easters and the folding of the Tennessee Tempo. Additionally, the Queens Pioneers moved to Manhattan and became known as the Manhattan Applesauce.

=== Standings ===
Eastern Division
	W	L	Game Points
New England Nor'easters	9.5	0.5	28
Boston Blitz	7	3	21.5
Baltimore Kingfishers	5.5	4.5	22
New York Knights	5	5	23.5
Philadelphia Masterminds	3.5	6.5	18
New Jersey Knockouts	3.5	6.5	16.5
Manhattan Applesause	3.5	6.5	15.5
Carolina Cobras	2	8	14

Western Division
	W	L	Game Points
Arizona Scorpions	6.5	3.5	22.5
Chicago Blaze	6	4	20.5
Miami Sharks	5.5	4.5	21
Seattle Sluggers	5	5	22
St. Louis Arch Bishops	5	5	18.5
Los Angeles Vibe	4.5	5.5	18.5
San Francisco Mechanics	4	6	19
Dallas Destiny	4	6	19

=== Playoffs ===
The top four teams from each division qualified for the playoffs.

Quarterfinals
E1	New England Nor'easters	2.5
E4	New York Knights	1.5
Eastern
E2	Boston Blitz	2.5
E3	Baltimore Kingfishers	1.5
W1	Arizona Scorpions	2*
W4	Seattle Sluggers	2
Western
W2	Chicago Blaze	1
W3	Miami Sharks	3

Semifinals
E1	New England Nor'easters	2*
E2	Boston Blitz	2
W1	Arizona Scorpions	1
W3	Miami Sharks	3

USCL Championship
E1	New England Nor'easters	3
W3	Miami Sharks	1

*Advanced due to draw odds

=== All Stars ===
1st Team All Stars
	Player (Team)
Board 1	Sergey Erenburg (BAL)
Board 2	Robert Hungaski (NE)
Board 3	Marcel Martinez (MIA)
Board 4	Alex Cherniack (NE)

2nd Team All Stars
	Player (Team)
Board 1	Julio Becerra (MIA)
Board 2	Pascal Charbonneau (NY)
Board 3	Michael Lee (SEA) (2432)
Board 4	Alex Guo (SEA)

3rd Team All Stars
	Player (Team)
Board 1	Hikaru Nakamura (STL)
Board 2	Marc Esserman (BOS)
Board 3	Ben Finegold (STL)
Board 4	Aleksandr Ostrovskiy (NY)

4th Team All Stars
	Player (Team)
Board 1	Varuzhan Akobian (SEA)
Board 2	Julio Sadorra (DAL)
Board 3	Daniel Rensch (ARZ)
Board 4	Nicholas Rosenthal (MIA)

== 2011 ==
The 2011 season began on August 29 and ended on November 20 with the New York Knights claiming their second title in three years title over the Chicago Blaze.

As in the 2009 season, the participating teams and divisions remained the same as in the previous season. The only major rule change was the increasing of roster size from nine spots to ten along with the elimination of the bonus roster spot that had previously been given if there was at least one woman on the team.

=== Standings ===
Eastern Division
	W	L	Game Points
Philadelphia Inventors	8	2	25.5
New York Knights	6	4	22
Boston Blitz	6	4	22
Manhattan Applesause	5.5	4.5	22.5
New England Nor'easters	5.5	4.5	20.5
Baltimore Kingfishers	3	7	16.5
Carolina Cobras	3	7	16.5
New Jersey Knockouts	2.5	7.5	16.5

Western Division
	W	L	Game Points
Chicago Blaze	8.5	1.5	28
Los Angeles Vibe	6.5	3.5	22.5
San Francisco Mechanics	5.5	4.5	21
Dallas Destiny	5.5	4.5	20.5
Arizona Scorpions	4.5	5.5	19.5
Miami Sharks	4.5	5.5	19
Seattle Sluggers	3.5	6.5	16
St. Louis Arch Bishops	2	8	14.5

=== Playoffs ===
The top four teams from each division qualified for the playoffs.

Quarterfinals
E1	Philadelphia Inventors	1
E4	Manhattan Applesause	3
Eastern
E2	New York Knights	2*
E3	Boston Blitz	2
W1	Chicago Blaze	2*
W4	Dallas Destiny	2
Western
W2	Los Angeles Vibe	2.5
W3	San Francisco Mechanics	1.5

Semifinals
E4	Manhattan Applesause	1.5
E2	New York Knights	2.5
W1	Chicago Blaze	2.5
W2	Los Angeles Vibe	1.5

USCL Championship
E2	New York Knights	2.5
W1	Chicago Blaze	1.5

*Advanced due to draw odds

=== All Stars ===
1st Team All Stars
	Player (Team)
Board 1	Jorge Sammour-Hasbun (BOS)
Board 2	Conrad Holt (DAL)
Board 3	Jay Bonin (PHI)
Board 4	William Fisher (PHI)

2nd Team All Stars
	Player (Team)
Board 1	Giorgi Kacheishvili (NY)
Board 2	Levon Altounian (ARZ)
Board 3	Tatev Abrahamyan (LA)
Board 4	Sam Schmakel (CHC)

3rd Team All Stars
	Player (Team)
Board 1	Ben Finegold (STL)
Board 2	Jesse Kraai (SF)
Board 3	Angelo Young (CHC)
Board 4	Roland Feng (SEA)

== 2012 ==
The 2012 season began on September 4 and ended on December 1 which featured the Philadelphia Inventors against the Seattle Sluggers; both making their first appearance in the title match. The Sluggers crushed the Inventors as they claimed their first title.

=== Expansion team ===
Despite making back-to-back playoff appearance and reaching the championship game the previous season, the Chicago Blaze did not play in 2012. Chicago's slot was filled by a new team, the Connecticut Dreadnoughts, featuring grandmaster Robert Hess as its top-rated player. This change resulted in a slight re-shuffling of the divisions, with the Carolina Cobras team moving back to the Western Division.

=== Standings ===
Eastern Division
	W	L	Game Points
Philadelphia Inventors	7.5	2.5	23.5
Manhattan Applesause	6.5	3.5	23
New York Knights	5.5	4.5	21
Baltimore Kingfishers	5.5	4.5	19
New Jersey Knockouts	5	5	19
Connecticut Dreadnoughts	4.5	5.5	19
Boston Blitz	4	6	20
New England Nor'easters	3	7	17.5

Western Division
	W	L	Game Points
Dallas Destiny	7	3	24
St. Louis Arch Bishops	6.5	3.5	24.5
Arizona Scorpions	5.5	4.5	22
Seattle Sluggers	5.5	4.5	19.5
San Francisco Mechanics	4	6	19
Los Angeles Vibe	3.5	6.5	16.5
Miami Sharks	3.5	6.5	15
Carolina Cobras	3	7	17.5

=== Playoffs ===
The top four teams from each division qualified for the playoffs.

Quarterfinals
E1	Philadelphia Inventors	3.5
E4	Baltimore Kingfishers	0.5
Eastern
E2	Manhattan Applesause	2.5
E3	New York Knights	1.5
W1	Dallas Destiny	1.5
W4	Seattle Sluggers	2.5
Western
W2	St. Louis Arch Bishops	1.5
W3	Arizona Scorpions	2.5

Semifinals
E1	Philadelphia Inventors	3
E2	Manhattan Applesause	1
W4	Seattle Sluggers	2.5
W3	Arizona Scorpions	1.5

USCL Championship
E1	Philadelphia Inventors	1
W4	Seattle Sluggers	3

*Advanced due to draw odds

=== All Stars ===
1st Team All Stars
	Player (Team)
Board 1	Sergey Erenburg (PHI)
Board 2	Priyadharshan Kannappan (STL)
Board 3	Dov Gorman (PHI)
Board 4	Shaun Smith (MAN)

2nd Team All Stars
	Player (Team)
Board 1	Varuzhan Akobian (SEA)
Board 2	Georgi Orlov (SEA)
Board 3	Joshua Sinanan (SEA)
Board 4	Alex King (MIA)

3rd Team All Stars
	Player (Team)
Board 1	Julio Sadorra (DAL)
Board 2	Levon Altounian (ARZ)
Board 3	Levan Bregadze (STL)
Board 4	Alexander Katz (NY)

== 2013 ==
The 2013 season began on August 27 and ended on November 20 with the Miami Sharks getting their first title over the New York Knights in a rematch from 2009 championship game.

This season was the first time chess.com hosted the USCL as the Internet Chess Club parted ways with the USCL.

Due to the fact ten out of sixteen teams use eastern time and two eastern time teams are situated in the western division, the USCL decided to have four divisions instead of two to deal with the issue.

=== Standings ===
Eastern Conference
Atlantic Division	W	L	Game Points
Manhattan Applesause	6.5	3.5	25
New York Knights	5.5	4.5	21
New Jersey Knockouts	4	6	18.5
Philadelphia Inventors	3	7	15.5
Northeast Division	W	L	Game Points
New England Nor'easters	7	3	24
Connecticut Dreadnoughts	6.5	3.5	23.5
Boston Blitz	4.5	5.5	19
Baltimore Kingfishers	3.5	6.5	16

Western Conference
Southern Division	W	L	Game Points
Miami Sharks	7.5	2.5	25
Dallas Destiny	7	3	22.5
St. Louis Arch Bishops	6	4	20.5
Carolina Cobras	1	9	13
Pacific Division	W	L	Game Points
San Francisco Mechanics	6.5	3.5	24.5
Los Angeles Vibe	4.5	5.5	19.5
Arizona Scorpions	4	6	16.5
Seattle Sluggers	3	7	16

=== Playoffs ===
The top two teams from each division qualified for the playoffs.

Quarterfinals
A1	Manhattan Applesauce	1.5
A2	New York Knights	2.5
N1	New England Nor'easters	2*
N2	Connecticut Dreadnoughts	2
S1	Miami Sharks	2.5
S2	Dallas Destiny	1.5
P1	San Francisco Mechanics	3
W2	Los Angeles Vibe	1

Semifinals
A2	New York Knights	2.5
N1	New England Nor'easters	1.5
S1	Miami Sharks	2.5
P1	San Francisco Mechanics	1.5

USCL Championship
A2	New York Knights	0.5
S1	Miami Sharks	3.5

*Advanced due to draw odds

=== All Stars ===
1st Team All Stars
	Player (Team)
Board 1	Zviad Izoria (MAN)
Board 2	Jeffery Xiong (DAL)
Board 3	Akshat Chandra (NY)
Board 4	Ryan Goldenberg (MAN)

2nd Team All Stars
	Player (Team)
Board 1	Julio Becerra (MIA)
Board 2	Renier Gonzalez (MIA)
Board 3	Eric Rodriguez (MIA)
Board 4	Siddharth Banik (SF)

3rd Team All Stars
	Player (Team)
Board 1	Vinay Bhat (SF)
Board 2	Daniel Naroditsky (SF)
Board 3	Vadim Martirosov (BOS)
Board 4	Lawyer Times (NE)

== 2014 ==
The 2014 season began on August 26 and ended on December 3 with the St. Louis Arch Bishops defeating the Dallas Destiny in a blitz tiebreaker.

=== Expansion team ===
With the addition of two new teams, the Rio Grande Ospreys and the Atlanta Kings, the league divided its eighteen teams into three divisions: Eastern, Southern, and Western.

=== Standings ===
Eastern Division
	W	L	Game Points
Manhattan Applesause	7.5	2.5	22.5
New York Knights	7	3	22
New Jersey Knockouts	6.5	3.5	21.5
Philadelphia Inventors	5	5	19.5
Boston Blitz	3	7	17
New England Nor'easters	0.5	9.5	13.5

Southern Division
	W	L	Game Points
St. Louis Arch Bishops	7.5	2.5	25
Miami Sharks	5	5	18.5
Connecticut Dreadnoughts	4.5	5.5	20.5
Baltimore Kingfishers	4.5	5.5	19.5
Atlanta Kings	4	6	20
Carolina Cobras	3.5	6.5	17

Western Division
	W	L	Game Points
Dallas Destiny	8	2	26.5
Rio Grande Ospreys	6.5	3.5	20.5
San Francisco Mechanics	6	4	22.5
Seattle Sluggers	4.5	5.5	22
Arizona Scorpions	4	6	17.5
Los Angeles Vibe	2.5	7.5	14.5

=== Playoffs ===
Ten total teams qualified for the playoffs. Division winners were seeded 1-3, second place teams were 4-6, third place teams were 7-9, while the wildcard team whose division scored the highest in interleague play qualified as the tenth seed.

1	Dallas Destiny	3
8	San Francisco Mechanics	2.5	8	San Francisco Mechanics	1
9	Connecticut Dreadnoughts	1.5	1	Dallas Destiny	2.5
4	New York Knights	1.5
4	New York Knights	2.5
5	Rio Grande Ospreys	1.5
1	Dallas Destiny	2
2	St. Louis Arch Bishops	2*
3	Manhattan Applesause	1
7	New Jersey Knockouts	2.5	6	Miami Sharks	3
10	Seattle Sluggers	1.5	2	St. Louis Arch Bishops	2*
6	Miami Sharks	2
2	St. Louis Arch Bishops	2.5
7	New Jersey Knockouts	1.5

*Won blitz tiebreaker

=== All Stars ===
1st Team All Stars
	Player (Team)
Board 1	Wesley So (STL)
Board 2	Le Quang Liem (STL)
Board 3	Francisco Guadalupe II (DAL)
Board 4	David Golub (SEA)

2nd Team All Stars
	Player (Team)
Board 1	Gata Kamsky (NY)
Board 2	Joel Benjamin (NJ)
Board 3	Richard Francisco (ATL)
Board 4	Karthik Ramachandran (DAL)

3rd Team All Stars
	Player (Team)
Board 1	Georgi Orlov (SEA)
Board 2	Andrey Stukopin (RIO)
Board 3	Cameron Wheeler (SF)
Board 4	Levy Rozman (MAN)

== 2015 ==
The 2015 season began on August 25 and ended on December 1 with the Manhattan Applesauce defeating the St. Louis Arch Bishops to claim their first title.

=== Expansion teams ===
With the addition of four new teams, the Las Vegas Desert Rats, Lubbock Tornadoes, Minnesota Blizzard, and San Diego Surfers, along with the departure of the Baltimore Kingfishers and the Los Angeles Vibe, the total number of teams reached 20, causing a reversion back to the two division system.

=== Standings ===
Eastern Division
	W	L	Game Points
New England Nor'easters	7.5	2.5	24
New York Knights	7.5	2.5	24
New Jersey Knockouts	7	3	25
Manhattan Applesause	6.5	3.5	22.5
Connecticut Dreadnoughts	5.5	4.5	21
Carolina Cobras	4	6	17
Boston Blitz	3.5	6.5	18
Atlanta Kings	3.5	6.5	15.5
Philadelphia Inventors	3	7	20
Miami Sharks	2	8	13

Western Division
	W	L	Game Points
Dallas Destiny	6.5	3.5	24
St. Louis Arch Bishops	6.5	3.5	23
Las Vegas Desert Rats	6	4	21.5
San Francisco Mechanics	6	4	19.5
Seattle Sluggers	5.5	4.5	22
Arizona Scorpions	4.5	5.5	19.5
Minnesota Blizzard	4.5	5.5	17
Lubbock Tornadoes	4	6	19.5
Rio Grande Ospreys	4	6	18
San Diego Surfers	2.5	7.5	16

=== Playoffs ===
The top six teams from each division qualified for the playoffs.

==== Eastern Division ====
Wildcard
E4	Manhattan Applesauce	2*
E5	Connecticut Dreadnoughts	2
E3	New Jersey Knockouts	2*
E6	Carolina Cobras	2

Quarterfinals
E1	New England Nor'easters	1.5
E4	Manhattan Applesauce	2.5
E2	New York Knights	2*
E3	New Jersey Knockouts	2

Semifinals
E4	Manhattan Applesauce	3
E2	New York Knights	1

*Advanced due to draw odds

==== Western Division ====
Wildcard
W4	San Francisco Mechanics	3
W5	Seattle Sluggers	1
W3	Las Vegas Desert Rats	4
W6	Arizona Scorpions	0

Quarterfinals
W1	Dallas Destiny	2.5
W4	San Francisco Mechanics	1.5
W2	St. Louis Arch Bishops	3
W3	Las Vegas Desert Rats	1

Semifinals
W1	Dallas Destiny	1.5
W2	St. Louis Arch Bishops	2.5

USCL Championship
E4	Manhattan Applesauce	2.5
E2	St. Louis Arch Bishops	1.5

=== All Stars ===
1st Team All Stars
	Player (Team)
Board 1	Zviad Izoria (MAN)
Board 2	Varuzhan Akobian (STL)
Board 3	Elliott Liu (LV)
Board 4	Nicholas Rosenthal (STL)

2nd Team All Stars
	Player (Team)
Board 1	Jeffery Xiong (DAL)
Board 2	Joel Benjamin (NJ)
Board 3	Levy Rozman (MAN)
Board 4	Bryce Tiglon (SEA)

3rd Team All Stars
	Player (Team)
Board 1	Andrey Stukopin (RIO)
Board 2	Andrey Gorovets (LUB)
Board 3	Atulya Vaidya (DAL)
Board 4	Jason Shi (CON)

== Titles by team ==
Team	Titles won	Last Won
Dallas Destiny	2	2008
New York Knight	2	2011
Baltimore Kingfishers	1	2005
Manhattan Applesauce	1	2015
Miami Sharks	1	2013
New England Nor'easters	1	2010
San Francisco Mechanics	1	2006
Seattle Sluggers	1	2012
St. Louis Arch Bishops	1	2014

== Format ==
Teams consist of rosters of ten players, and each week the manager selects a lineup of four, depending on rating, form, and availability. The average rating for each match is capped at less than 2401, with certain exceptions for highly rated players.

The season starts the last week of August or first week of September and ends in late November or early December. Each team plays one match per week, and matches are almost always scheduled for Tuesday and Wednesday nights. All matches are played online at the Internet Chess Club. Team members gather at a common public location where a league-approved tournament director is present.

If either team in a given match scores two and a half points or more from the four games, that team wins the match. If the score is split at two points apiece, the match is drawn. At the end of the regular season, the four teams in each division with the highest match point totals qualify for the playoffs, which are conducted in a knockout format. In the Championship match, a drawn match proceeds to a series of blitz games to determine the ultimate winner.
