= Igor Zugic =

Canadian chess player (born 1981)

Personal information
- Born: December 23, 1981 (age 44) Sarajevo, SR Bosnia and Herzegovina

Chess career
- Country: Canada
- Title: International Master (1999)
- FIDE rating: 2447 (July 2026)
- Peak rating: 2481 (January 2007)

Igor Zugic (born 23 December 1981) is a Canadian chess player who holds the FIDE title of International Master. He was the 2006 Canadian Champion and is an engineer by profession.

Zugic was born in Sarajevo and emigrated to Canada with his family at age 12, settling in Toronto. His first important Canadian chess results came in 1996 when he won both the Canadian Championship for Grade 9 and the Canadian Under 18 Championship. He was of National Master strength by this time, at age 15. He represented Canada at the World Youth Chess Championships, Boys' Under 18 Group, in both 1996 and 1998.

== International Master ==
Zugic won the Canadian Grade 12 Championship in 1999 and earned his International Master title in 2000, and made a Grandmaster norm at New York City the same year. He studied computer engineering at the University of Toronto, graduating in 2004, and represented the school in the Pan American Intercollegiate Team Chess Championship.

Zugic tied for third place in the Closed Zonal Canadian Chess Championship at Toronto 2004, with 6.5/9, behind Pascal Charbonneau and Eric Lawson. Zugic won the Guelph International 2005, making his second Grandmaster norm. He represented Canada at the American Continental Chess Championship at Buenos Aires 2005.

== Olympian and Canadian Champion ==
Zugic was first selected for the Canadian Chess Olympiad team in 2000, and has made the team twice more since. Here are his results playing in this championship:

- 2000: 34th Chess Olympiad Istanbul, board 3, 5/9, +3 =4 -2;
- 2004: 36th Chess Olympiad Calvià, board 4, 4/10, +2 =4 -4;
- 2006: 37th Chess Olympiad Turin, board 3, 5/9, +3 =4 -2;
- 2008: 38th Chess Olympiad Dresden board 3, 7/10, +5=4-1.
- His combined results for Canada are: +13 =16 -9, for 55 per cent.

Zugic won the Closed Zonal Canadian Chess Championship at Toronto 2006 with 7/9, and represented Canada in the 2007 Chess World Cup, losing his first-round match to Michael Adams by 0.5-1.5. His Canadian rating as of May 2007 was 2553, and his International FIDE rating is 2481. The site chessgames.com has 106 of his games, the site chessbase.com has 342 of his games, and the site mychess.com has 320 of his games; many of these games would be duplicated between sites.

== Notable chess games ==
- Georgi Kacheishvili vs Igor Zugic, Istanbul Olympiad 2000, King's Indian Attack (A07), 0-1 Very solid positional performance against a strong Grandmaster.
- Igor Zugic vs Irina Krush, New York Smartchess.com International 2001, English Opening (A21), 1-0 Convincing win over one of the world's top women players.
- Igor Zugic vs Ljubomir Ftacnik, Montreal International 2002, Grunfeld Defence, Exchange Variation (D85), 1-0 It's the youngster against the veteran, and this time the young gun triumphs.
- Igor Zugic vs Dmitry Tyomkin, Canadian Zonal Championship, Toronto 2004, English Opening (A15), 1-0 Theory gets left behind early as both sides play to win in this sharp encounter.
- Hrvoje Stevic vs Igor Zugic, Calvia Olympiad 2004, Sicilian Defence, Alapin Variation (B22), 0-1 Another 2500+ player has to topple his King.
