= Simultaneous exhibition =

Board game exhibition where one player plays multiple games simultaneously

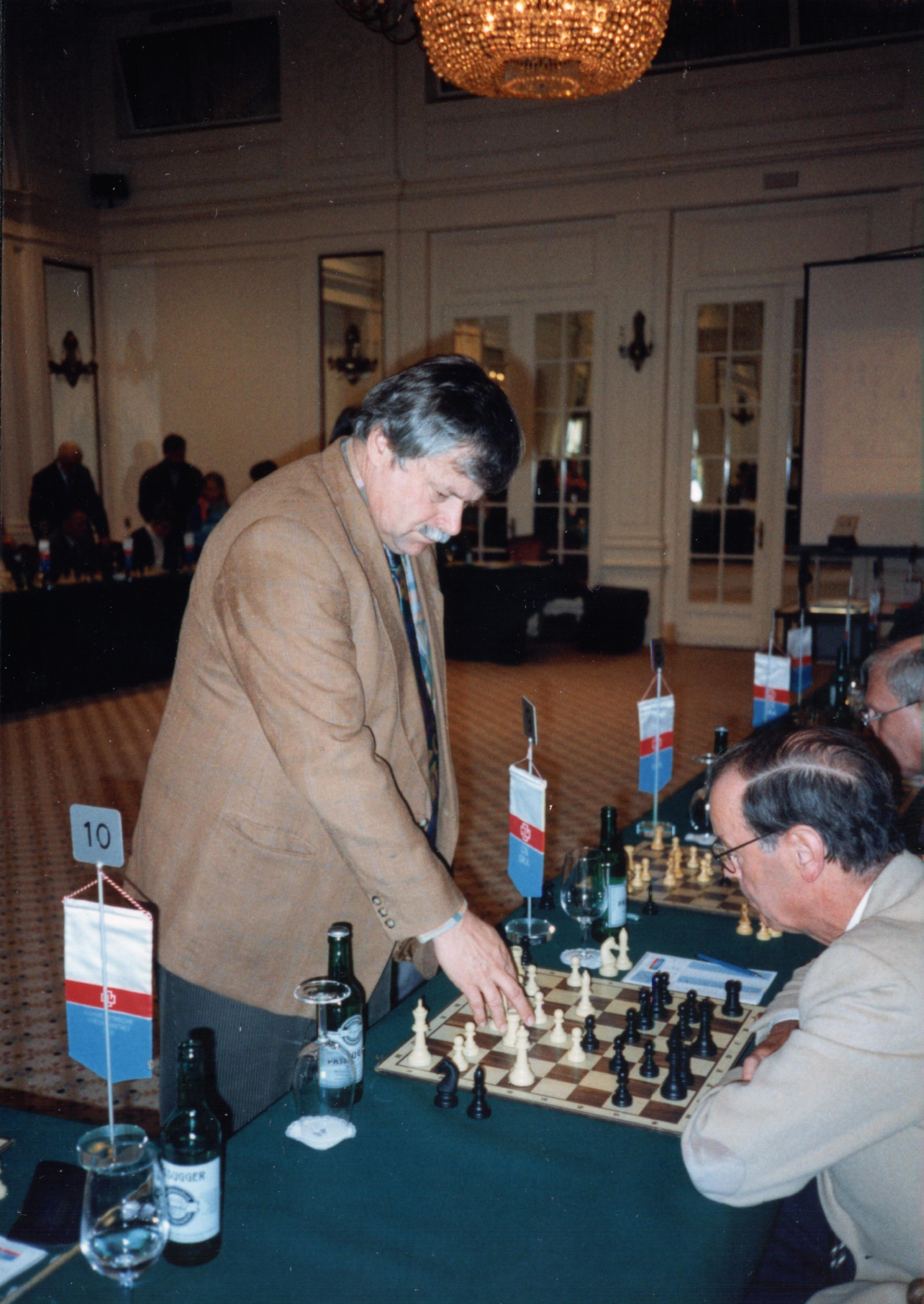
Grandmaster Vlastimil Hort giving a simultaneous exhibition, 1997

A simultaneous exhibition or simultaneous display is a board game exhibition (commonly chess or Go) in which one player (typically of high rank, such as a grandmaster or dan-level player) plays multiple games at a time with a number of other players. Such an exhibition is often referred to simply as a "simul".

== Procedure ==
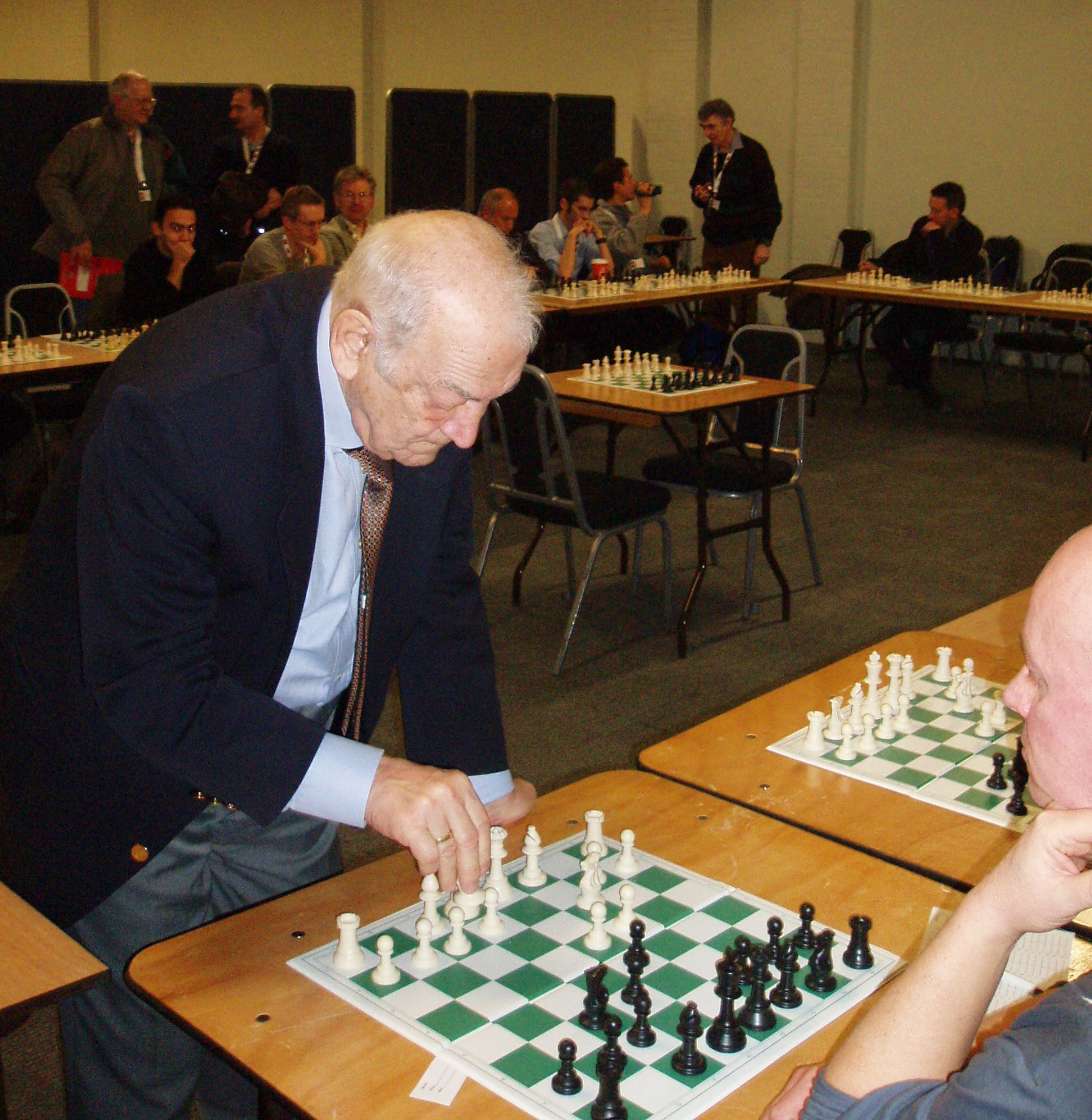
Viktor Korchnoi's simul

In a regular simul, no chess clocks are used (if they are involved it is called a clock simul). The boards are usually arranged in a large circle or square and the exhibitor walks from board to board in a fixed order. Each individual participant is expected to make a move when the exhibitor arrives at their board. The exhibitor may pause briefly before playing their move, but will typically attempt to avoid lengthy pauses because too many such pauses will cause the exhibition to continue for an extended period. Longer exhibitions increase the risk of fatigue-induced blunders on the part of the exhibitor, especially since the individual participants remaining at the end tend to be the stronger players who represent the exhibitor's most challenging opponents. As games are finished off, they are usually not replaced and only a few games will remain in progress at the end of the exhibition. At this point clocks are sometimes introduced with each side getting a fixed amount of time. In most regular simuls, the exhibitor plays White in all the games and the individual participants are of varying playing strengths (though they are typically below master class).

In clock simuls all the games are played as normal tournament games and are timed by a chess clock. These simuls require the exhibitor to accept a substantial time handicap since their clock continues to run on all boards. These simuls typically involve a relatively small number of individual participants whose playing strength is at or near master class. Occasionally, grandmasters have given blindfold simultaneous displays. In such displays, the exhibitor does not look at any of the boards, but retains all the moves of the games in their head. The opponents utilize boards and pieces in the standard fashion, but their moves are communicated verbally to the exhibitor by an arbiter or intermediary.

== Donner's advice ==
Dutch grandmaster Jan Hein Donner offered the following advice to a player taking a board at a simultaneous exhibition:

If you are to stand a chance of scoring a half or a full point, there are a few things to bear in mind:

1. Be sure to take special care in the opening. Play something you know well and play carefully. The simul-giver will be very unpleasantly surprised to find that after some twenty moves he has achieved nothing at your board. He will usually propose a draw to be rid of such a troublemaker. Do not accept! Your boldness will greatly upset him.
2. Play aggressively. Ninety-five percent of all victims in simultaneous displays usually owe their defeat to their own passivity. The simul-giver lacks the time to work out variations but doing so is more important when defending than in an attack. On psychological grounds, too, aggressively approaching the simul-giver is a sound and very effective strategy.
3. Don't be afraid to exchange pieces. The simul-giver will play the endgame much better than you, of course, but it is—once again—very important at this stage of the game to calculate variations and that is precisely what he has no time for. Do not be afraid!

== Games ==
Here are some significant games from simultaneous exhibitions:

- A future world champion defeats the reigning champion.

Capablanca–Botvinnik, simultaneous exhibition; Leningrad 1925
1.d4 d5 2.c4 e6 3.Nc3 Nf6 4.Bg5 Nbd7 5.e3 Bb4 6.cxd5 exd5 7.Qb3 c5 8.dxc5 Qa5 9.Bxf6 Nxf6 10.0-0-0 0-0 11.Nf3 Be6 12.Nd4 Rac8 13.c6 Bxc3 14.Qxc3 Qxa2 15.Bd3 bxc6 16.Kc2 c5 17.Nxe6 Qa4+ 18.b3 Qa2+ 19.Qb2 Qxb2+ 20.Kxb2 fxe6 21.f3 Rc7 22.Ra1 c4 23.bxc4 dxc4 24.Bc2 Rb8+ 25.Kc1 Nd5 26.Re1 c3 27.Ra3 Nb4 28.Re2 Rd8 29.e4 Rc6 30.Re3 Rd2 31.Raxc3 Rxc2+ 32.Rxc2 Rxc2+ 0–1

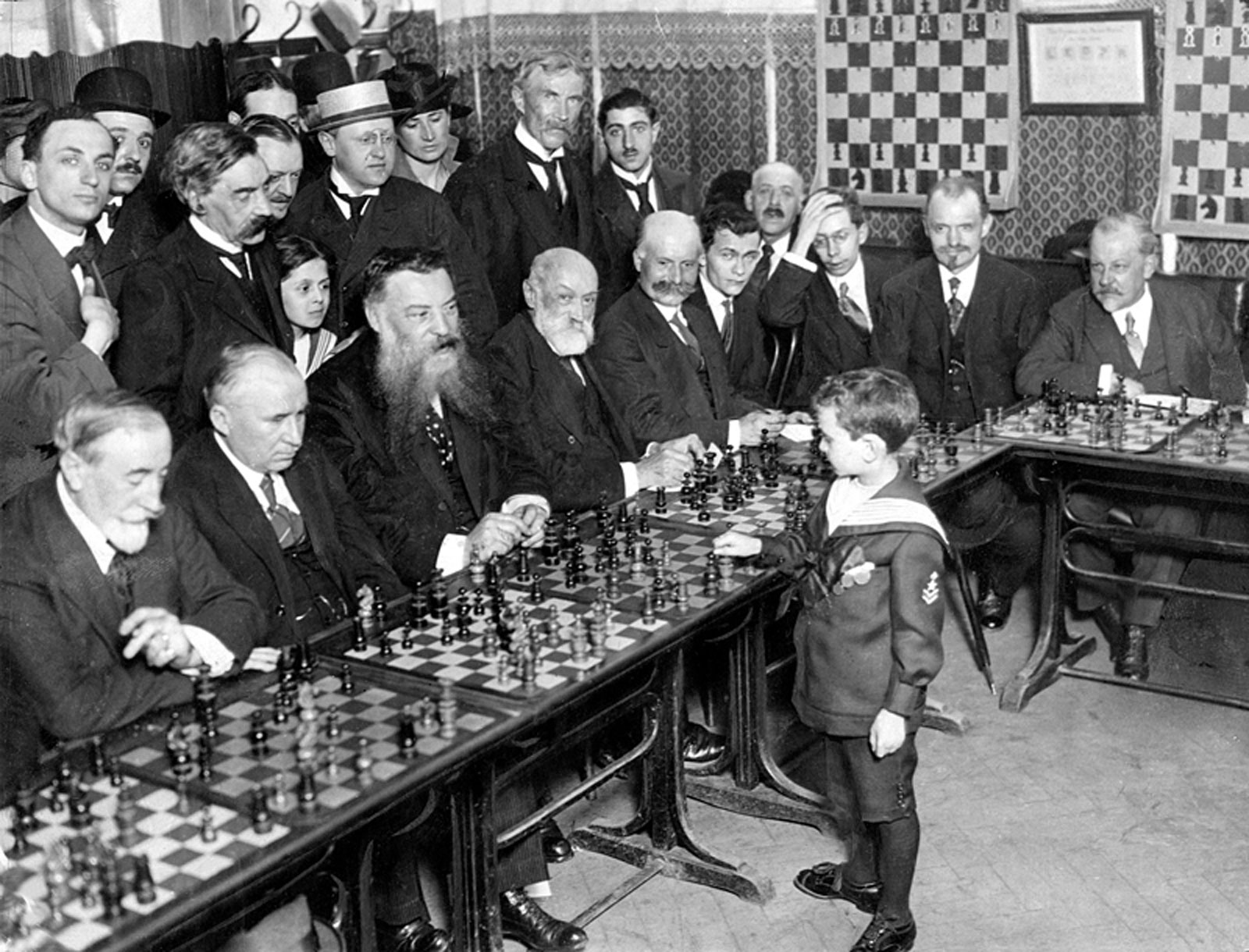
The chess prodigy Samuel Reshevsky, 8 years old, performing a simultaneous exhibition against adults in Paris, 1920.

- The following Evans Gambit, won by Bobby Fischer as White at a 10-board clock simultaneous, was well-played enough that Fischer included it in his famous book My 60 Memorable Games.

Fischer–O. Celle, clock simultaneous; Davis, California 1964
1.e4 e5 2.Nf3 Nc6 3.Bc4 Bc5 4.b4 Bxb4 5.c3 Be7 6.d4 d6 7.dxe5 Nxe5 8.Nxe5 dxe5 9.Qh5 g6 10.Qxe5 Nf6 11.Ba3 Rf8 12.0-0 Ng4 13.Qg3 Bxa3 14.Nxa3 Qe7 15.Bb5+ c6 16.Nc4 Qe6 17.Rad1 cxb5 18.Qc7 Bd7 19.Nd6+ Ke7 20.Nf5+ gxf5 21.exf5 Rac8 22.Rxd7+ Qxd7 23.f6+ Nxf6 24.Re1+ Ne4 25.Rxe4+ Kf6 26.Qxd7 Rfd8 27.Qg4 1–0

- This Elephant Gambit, won by Black against a famous grandmaster, was cited by Walter Korn in Modern Chess Openings.

Gligorić–Holze, simultaneous exhibition; Hamburg 1970
1. e4 e5 2. Nf3 d5 3. exd5 e4 4. Qe2 Nf6 5. Nc3 (Korn recommends 5.d3! Qxd5 6.Nfd2 Be7 7.Nxe4 0-0 8.Nbc3 Qa5 9.Bd2 and White had a large advantage in Keres–De Agustin, Madrid 1943) Be7 6. Nxe4 0-0 7. d3 Re8 8. Bd2 Nxd5 9. 0-0-0 Be6 (9...f5) 10. Kb1 Nc6 11. Nc3 Bf6 12. Nxd5 Qxd5 13. c4 Qd6 14. Be3 b5 15. Qc2 Nb4 16. Qc1 bxc4 17. dxc4 Qa6 18. a3 Bf5+ 19. Ka1 Qxa3#

== Internet-based simultaneous exhibitions ==
The internet has allowed for the creation of chess game services wherein people may play an opponent from anywhere in the world. Popular sites such as Lichess may have many thousands of active online games as well as tens of thousands of viewers during any time of day around the world. This new online chess paradigm allows for world class players to be actively playing chess as well as teaching and giving demonstrations. On 13 April 2019, a simultaneous exhibition was hosted by Lichess for International Master Marc Esserman who engaged 100 players. He rapidly moved through a hundred Kings Pawn E4 opening and the matches lasted anywhere from thirty minutes to a full eight hours. Many top level players were involved and the exhibition lasted for just over eight hours. IM Marc Esserman won 82 of the games played with 11 ending in a draw.

== Tandem simul ==
A less popular variation of simultaneous exhibition is the tandem simultaneous exhibition, also known as leapfrog simultaneous exhibition, where more than one (usually two) experts play a number of opponents, making successive moves without consulting one another.
