= Marc Esserman =

American chess player (born 1983)

Personal information
- Born: July 28, 1983 (age 43) Miami, Florida

Chess career
- Country: United States
- Title: International Master (2009)
- FIDE rating: 2438 (October 2026)
- Peak rating: 2474 (April 2016)

Marc Esserman (born July 28, 1983) is an American chess player who currently holds the FIDE title of International Master (IM).

== Scholastic career ==
Esserman began playing chess at the age of 7. Scholastic competition resulted in two national team titles in 1994 and 1995. In April 1997, at the first-ever Super Nationals in Knoxville, Tennessee, he went undefeated (7–0) to become the K–8 co-champion, edging out several players rated over 400 points higher. In March 1999, Esserman tied for 1st in the Florida State Championship, again with a perfect score.

Press coverage of Esserman's chess career continued while an undergraduate at Harvard College. There, he was active promoting chess on campus, serving as captain of the Harvard Chess Club for four years, and helping to organize a chess exchange trip to Beijing, China. There, he played (and defeated) the reigning women's world champion, Xu Yuhua, as part of an inter-university match.

During high school and college, Esserman trained under IM Calvin Blocker, GM Anatoly Lein, and later GM William Lombardy. In a trip to Russia, he also studied briefly with Igor Zaitsev.

== Professional career ==
After graduation, he returned to Boston in 2008 to promote local chess and chess education by serving on the board of directors of the Boylston Chess Club and representing the city of Boston in the United States Chess League. As a member of the Boston Blitz, he has demonstrated a high winning percentage with a lifetime league score of 75%, ranking him No. 6 league-wide. In the 2009–2010 season and the 2010–2011 season, six out of his eight games placed either 1st or 2nd in the league's game of the week contest—with Esserman winning four of those awarded games. Some of these games have been published for Esserman's "brilliant performance" and sacrificial, tactical qualities. Esserman placed 3rd in the League's 2010 Game of the Year contest. A number of his games have been recorded in The New York Times, The Boston Globe, the New York Post, The Washington Times, The Scotsman, La Libre Belgique, Новости шахмат ("Chess News"), and other newspapers.

Esserman has achieved notable results in major European and U.S. open and invitational tournaments, in which he has defeated numerous grandmasters. Pre-title major tournament experience was auspicious with a tie for 1st in the 2003 Atlantic Open alongside four experienced GMs, in which he also split the U2400 1st prize. After a return to serious tournament chess in 2008, IM norms and top finishes followed quickly. He was a co-winner at the Eastern Class Championship in Sturbridge (2009), the New York State Championship (2010), and the Liberty Bell Open in Philadelphia, Pennsylvania (2011). He tied for 3rd at the Miami Open (2008) with 6½/9 and reported on the top performances, including his own brilliancy in the Smith–Morra Gambit against fellow IM Justin Sarkar. He tied for 2nd at the Wunsiedel Schachfest in Wunsiedel, Germany (2011). On June 20, 2010, he achieved an upset in the New York Invitational Tournament against former U.S. champion Joel Benjamin. In August 2011, at the 112th US Open, he defeated Loek van Wely in a spectacular game that has been widely republished in chess database top game selections, in print, in chess videos, and in chess blogs. In particular, GM Kevin Spraggett prefaced his game analysis by observing that "Esserman had already established a reputation for producing some Tal-like masterpieces." Due to a late-round loss, Esserman finished in a multi-way tie for 8th place with 7/9, a half-point behind a 7-way tie for 1st.

Esserman's games have been featured for their instructional value and deep tactical ideas in Larry Christiansen's popular Internet Chess Club broadcast, Attack with LarryC, on 11 March 2009, 25 November 2009, and 17 August 2011.

In February 2016, Esserman competed in the prestigious Gibraltar Masters chess festival. There he defeated former world championship challenger Nigel Short. Later in the tournament, he had the opportunity to face five-time world champion Viswanathan Anand. As White, Esserman played his favorite Morra Gambit. The players agreed to a draw after a repetition of moves, but many commentators felt that Esserman could have won. A few weeks later in the Capelle-La-Grande International, Esserman defeated Grandmaster Yuri Vovk, again with the Morra Gambit, and drew world champion candidate Artur Yusupov. In March 2016, during the Reykjavik Open, Esserman drew grandmasters Richárd Rapport and Alexander Beliavsky.

== Teaching and writing ==
Esserman has given lectures and simuls in his specialty opening, the Smith–Morra Gambit, at various chess clubs. He is the author of the book Mayhem in the Morra!, published in 2012.

He is an occasional contributor to Chess Life, and was a frequent contributor to the United States Chess League news blog before it folded in 2016.

Marc Esserman continues to teach on the streaming platform Twitch, where he gives lectures on various chess games and concepts.

== Other interests ==
Esserman is an avid tennis player who has played in several professional tournaments.

He is a frequent visitor to the Harvard Square chess scene.
