= PRO Chess League =

Online rapid chess league

Professional Rapid Online Chess League (PRO Chess League)
- Most recent season or competition: 2023
- Formerly: United States Chess League
- Sport: Chess
- First season: 2017
- Folded: 2024
- Commissioner: Greg Shahade
- No. of teams: 32
- Country: International
- Last champion: Gotham Knights (1st title)
- Most titles: St. Louis Arch Bishops (2 titles)
- Broadcaster: Twitch
- Related competitions: Speed Chess Championship
- Website: www.prochessleague.com

The Professional Rapid Online Chess League (PRO Chess League and abbreviated PCL) was an online rapid chess league operated by Chess.com. It was preceded by the United States Chess League, which announced in 2016 that it would be renamed, reformatted, and opened to cities from around the world, and moved to the website chess.com. It was discontinued in 2024.

In its inaugural season, the PCL comprised 48 teams, whose members included some of the highest-rated chess players in the world, including the reigning world champion Magnus Carlsen, and other elite players including Maxime Vachier-Lagrave, Hikaru Nakamura, and Wesley So plus over 100 other grandmasters. The 48 teams represent cities in five continents.

== Teams ==
| Country | Team | 2017 (48) | 2018 (32) | 2019 (32) | 2020 () | 2021 () | 2023 () | Total appearances | Total championships |
|---|---|---|---|---|---|---|---|---|---|
| ARG | Buenos Aires Krakens | QF | 8th in division | | | | | | 0 |
| ARG | Patagonia Penguins | 9th in division | | | | | | | 0 |
| ARM | Armenia Eagles | | 1st | | DSQ | | | | 1 |
| AUS | Australia Kangaroos | | QF | | | | | | 0 |
| CAN | Montreal Chessbrahs | SF | 7th in division | | | | | | 0 |
| CAN | Toronto Dragons | L24 | | | | | | | 0 |
| CHN | Chengdu Pandas | | 2nd | | | | | | 0 |
| ENG | London Lions | L16 | 6th in division | | | | | | 0 |
| ENG | London Towers | L16 | 8th in division | | | | | | 0 |
| EST | Estonia Horses | | L16 | | | | | | 0 |
| FRA | Cannes Blockbusters | L24 | L16 | | | | | | 0 |
| FRA | Marseille Migraines | QF | QF | | | | | | 0 |
| GER | Hamburg Swashbucklers | 7th in division | | | | | | | 0 |
| HUN | Budapest Gambit | L16 | | | | | | | 0 |
| IND | Amaravati Yodhas | 10th in division | | | | | | | 0 |
| IND | Delhi Dynamite | L16 | L16 | | | | | | 0 |
| IND | Mumbai Movers | L24 | QF | | | | | | 0 |
| IND | Odisha Express | 9th in division | | | | | | | 0 |
| IRL | Doblin Desperados | 10th in division | | | | | | | 0 |
| ISL | Reykjavik Puffins | 9th in division | 7th in division | | | | | | 0 |
| KAZ | Shymkent Nomads | 11th in division | | | | | | | 0 |
| LAT | Riga Magicians | L24 | 7th in division | | | | | | 0 |
| NED | Amsterdam Mosquitoes | L24 | 5th in division | | | | | | 0 |
| NED | Apeldoorn Apres | 8th in division | | | | | | | 0 |
| NGR | Abuja Rockstars | 11th in division | | | | | | | 0 |
| NGR | Lagos Leatherbacks | 12th in division | | | | | | | 0 |
| NOR | Norway Gnomes | 2nd | 5th in division | | | | | | 0 |
| NOR | Oslo Trolls | | 8th in division | | | | | | 0 |
| RSA | Johannesburg Koeksisters | 12th in division | | | | | | | 0 |
| RUS | Gorky Stormbringers (2017); Volga Stormbringers (2018-) | QF | 6th in division | | | | | | 0 |
| SLO | Ljubljana Direwolves | 7th in division | | | | | | | 0 |
| SLO | Ljubljana Turtles | | 4th | | | | | | 0 |
| SRB | Belgrade Sparrows | 8th in division | | | | | | | 0 |
| SWE | Stockholm Snowballs | SF | L16 | | | | | | 0 |
| USA | Atlanta Kings | 10th in division | | | | | | | 0 |
| USA | Carolina Cobras | 11th in division | | | | | | | 0 |
| USA | Columbus Cardinals | 12th in division | | | | | | | 0 |
| USA | Dallas Destiny | L24 | L16 | | | | | | 0 |
| USA | Las Vegas Desert Rats | 7th in division | 8th in division | | | | | | 0 |
| USA | Miami Champions | L16 | 6th in division | | | | | | 0 |
| USA | Minnesota Blizzard | 8th in division | QF | | | | | | 0 |
| USA | Montclair Sopranos | L16 | 5th in division | | | | | | 0 |
| USA | New Jersey Knockouts | 7th in division | | | | | | | 0 |
| USA | New York Knights | 8th in division | | | | | | | 0 |
| USA | Philadelphia Inventors | L24 | | | | | | | 0 |
| USA | Pittsburgh Pawngrabbers | 11th in division | L16 | | | | | | 0 |
| USA | Portland Rain | 12th in division | | | | | | | 0 |
| USA | Rio Grande Ospreys | L24 | 7th in division | | | | | | 0 |
| USA | Saint Louis Arch Bishops | 1st | 3rd | 1st | 1st | | | | 3 |
| USA | San Diego Surfers | L16 | L16 | | | | | | 0 |
| USA | San Francisco Mechanics | 10th in division | | | | | | | 0 |
| USA | San Jose Hackers | L16 | 5th in division | | | | | | 0 |
| USA | Seattle Sluggers | 9th in division | 6th in division | | | | | | 0 |
| USA | Webster Windmills | QF | L16 | | | | | | 0 |

== Format ==
The league had a variety of formats over its history, but there were some consistent points throughout. Matches were played between teams of 4 players using the scheveningen system, pitting each team member against every player from the opposing team. Teams had a rating cap (usually 2500) to ensure balanced matchups.

Teams were split into geographical divisions (Central & Western for Europe & West/Central Asia, and Atlantic & Pacific for the Americas, East Asia & the Pacific nations)

The time control was 15+2 in the first seasons, but this changed to 10+2 for the later seasons.

== History ==
=== 2017–present ===
The first season started on January 11, 2017, and ended March 26, 2017. 48 teams participated, twelve of which had previously participated in the USCL. After the end of the first season, the St. Louis Arch Bishops defeated the Norway Gnomes, thus securing their first title. Wesley So won MVP. The PCL has a total prize fund of $50,000 compared to a prize fund of $10,000 in the USCL. In its second season, Greg Shahade introduced and new qualifications to join the league and an All-Star Game.

== Championship history ==
PRO Chess League Champions
| Team | Year |
|---|---|
| (United States) St. Louis Arch Bishops (1) | 2017 |
| Armenia Eagles (1) | 2018 |
| (United States) St. Louis Arch Bishops (2) | 2019 |
| (United States) St. Louis Arch Bishops (3) | 2020 |
| Russia Wizards (1) | 2021 |
| (United States) Gotham Knights (1) | 2023 |

== Critic response ==
Supporters say the league's worldwide distribution, the prize money, and the participation of many of the world's top-rated players may create a new level of competition and awareness for the game. It is anticipated that the new formats are leading to a "rise in popularity of online and rapid chess". In addition, the PCL has the potential to dramatically change chess culture and could lead to corporate sponsorships. This change from an "individual and slow game," to a relatively quick and team format, has made the offering more viewer friendly.

In a 2017 article, Greg Shahade made a similar statement to what Eric Rosen mentioned. Shahade talked about the league featuring worldwide team competition, using the scheveningen system which gives lower rated players the chance to pull upset each week, and having the chance to "revolutionize chess".

In an article written by ESPN, Viswanathan Anand spoke about how convenient it was to play online compared to playing over-the-board.

Here you don't get together with the team the previous night to discuss strategy, so it's far more improvised. In all leagues you play one game a day. Here you play four, so you're very alive to the evolving score.

— Viswanathan Anand, article by ESPN
