= Greg Shahade =

American chess player (born 1978)

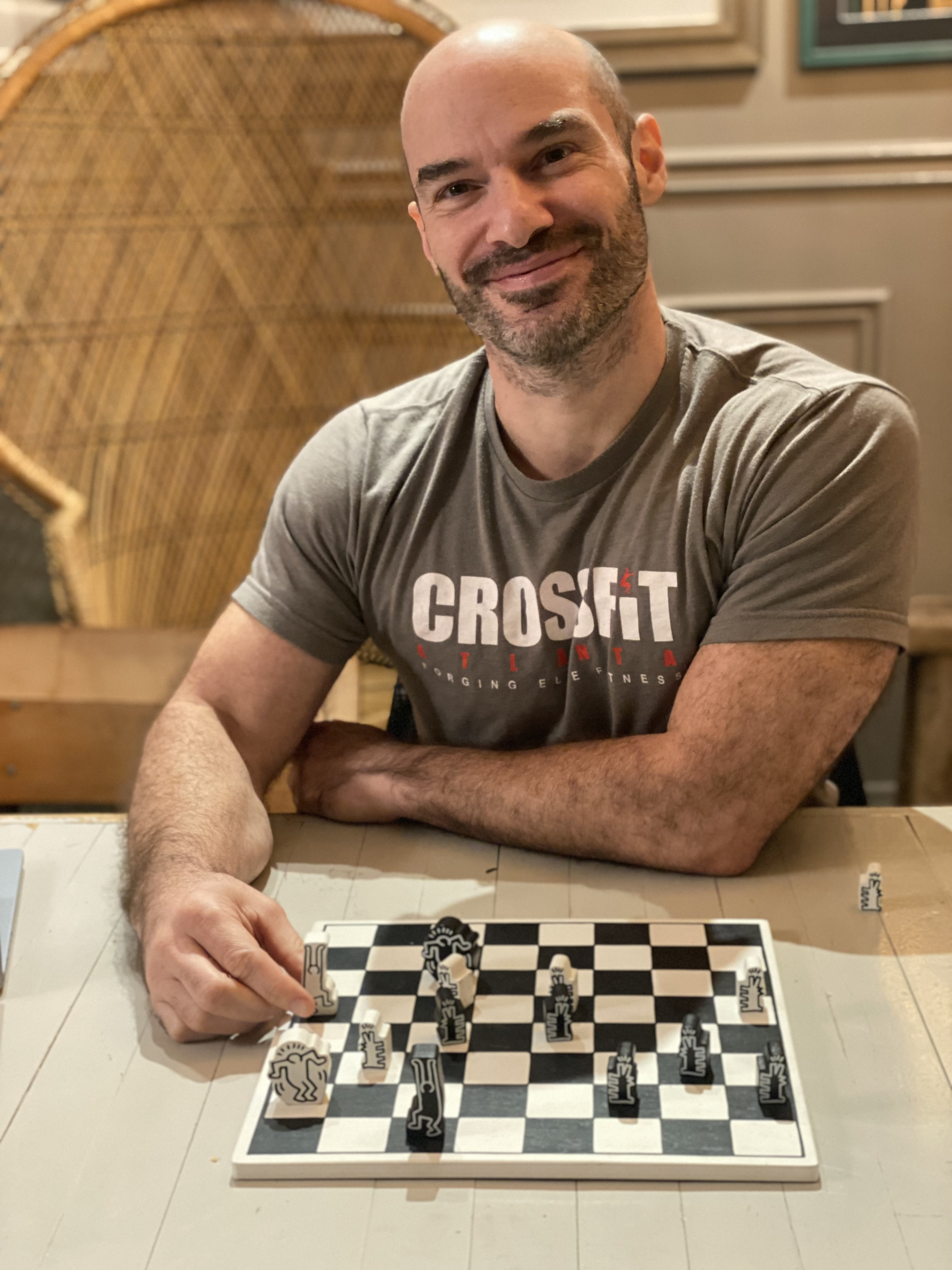
- Shahade in 2022

Personal information
- Born: Gregory Shahade; December 22, 1978 (age 47) Philadelphia, Pennsylvania, US

Chess career
- Country: United States
- Title: International Master (2001)
- FIDE rating: 2476 (October 2026)
- Peak rating: 2476 (December 2012)

Gregory Shahade (born December 22, 1978) is an International Master of chess. He founded the New York Masters and the U.S. Chess League and is a former member of the executive board of the United States Chess Federation, to which his younger sister, Jennifer Shahade, was hired as the executive editor-in-chief. In 2026, he was a three-day champion on the TV trivia game show Jeopardy!

== Early life and career ==
Shahade's father is FIDE Master Michael Shahade and his mother was Drexel University chemistry professor and author Sally Solomon. His sister is Woman Grandmaster Jennifer Shahade.

Shahade had a distinguished scholastic career, highlighted by three national chess championships: tying for first in the 1993 National Junior High School Championship and the 1996 National High School Championship, and winning the 1996 United States Junior Open outright. He was the leading scorer for Julia R. Masterman School in 1996, when they won their first of four National High School Chess Championships. He won the prestigious Samford Fellowship, awarded by the U.S. Chess Trust to the top U.S. prospect under the age of 25, in 1999. The fellowship granted Shahade approximately $25,000 to train for and play in top tournaments. He was also renewed for it in 2000 and subsequently scored his first Grandmaster norm at the Bermuda Closed in January 2001.

== Later ventures ==
Since 2006, he has held 30 sessions of the U.S. Chess School, where the nation's top young chess talents are invited to train under the instruction of various Grandmasters. He was the founder and Commissioner of the U.S. Chess League, which folded in 2016.

Starting in October 2007, Shahade has been making chess videos at ChessVideos.tv. He is the host of U.S. Chess lessons in which he invites coaches to teach for future chess prodigies. Currently, Shahade is the commissioner of Professional Rapid Online Chess League.

In April 2026, Shahade competed on the trivia show Jeopardy!. In his first game, aired April 27, he defeated Jamie Ding, the fifth-longest reigning champion in Jeopardy! history, who had won 31 games in a row. Shahade won two more games before losing his fourth game (airdate April 30) to novelist Kate Brody.
