= National Fuel Cell Research Center =

Research center at the University of California, Irvine

Coordinates: 33°38′37.6″N 117°50′22.7″W

- Type: Research Center
- Established: 1998
- Director: Iryna Zenyuk
- Faculty: 9
- Undergraduates: 10
- Postgraduates: 28
- Location: Irvine, California, U.S.
- Website: Official website

The National Fuel Cell Research Center (NFCRC) is a research laboratory at the University of California, Irvine. It was established in 1998 by the U.S. Department of Energy and the California Energy Commission. Over 50 researchers are affiliated with the center as research scientists, faculty, or graduate students. Since 2022, the research center has been directed by Iryna Zenyuk.

== History ==
The NFCRC was established on February 25, 1998 by the U.S. Department of Energy (DOE) and California Energy Commission (CEC) with the goal of conducting scientific research aimed towards the development of zero emission sources of power generation and expanding consumer choice. The center was tasked with accelerating fuel cell technology development and facilitating its implementation in the California energy market.

The center received partnerships from the Southern California Edison company and Pacific Rim Consortium on Combustion, Energy, and the Environment (PARCON). It received a $300k grant from the CEC in 1998.

== Research ==
The center’s primary research concerns fuel cell technology, including electrochemistry and electrocatalysis for applications including hydrogen-powered vehicles, renewable hydrogen generation, stationary power, and energy storage. Faculty and researchers at the NFCRC also focus on feasibility studies, market challenges, and integration of fuel cell systems with central power plants and large-scale energy infrastructure.

The NFCRC received $3.75 million in research funding from the DOE in 2023 and $1.8 million from the South Coast Air Quality Management District in 2018 to develop hydrogen fueling stations. A portion of research is funded by the National Science Foundation (NSF). The center employs over 40 undergraduate and graduate students from all disciplines of engineering and the physical and biological sciences and collaborates on projects and instruction with the UC Irvine School of Medicine, Paul Merage School of Business, and social sciences departments.

The center is affiliated with DOE projects including Hydrogen from Next-Generation Electrolyzers of Water (H2NEW), Million Miles Fuel Cell Truck, and Advanced Light Source (ALS) at Lawrence Berkeley National Laboratory.

The NFCRC acts as co-chair and co-administrator of the California Stationary Fuel Cell Collaborative. Its industry collaborators include Bosch, Chevron, Horiba, Toyota, Cabot, Plug Power, and others.

== Location ==
The NFCRC is located in Irvine, California and uses the Engineering Laboratory Facility on the south end of Aldrich Park as its primary facility. The DOE selected the site in part because the City of Irvine is one of the largest planned communities in the country with a history of environmental stewardship dating to the 1960s. In addition, the area is home to the highest concentration of energy consulting firms in the United States.

== Directors ==
No.	Director	Start	End	Notes
1	Scott Samuelsen	1998	2018	Founding director
2	Jack Brouwer	2018	2022	Associate director from 1998 to 2018
3	Iryna Zenyuk	2022	Present	

== See also ==
- Center for Energy Research
- California Energy Commission
