= Jack Brouwer =

American engineer (born 1965)

- Born: Jacob A. Brouwer; December 26, 1965 (age 60)

Academic background
- Education: University of California, Irvine (BS, MS); Massachusetts Institute of Technology (PhD)

Academic work
- Institutions: UC Irvine; Clean Energy Institute
- Main interests: Renewable energy; fuel cell; electrochemistry
- Website: eng.uci.edu/jack-brouwer

Jacob A. Brouwer (born December 26, 1965) is an American engineer and hydrogen fuel cell researcher. He is Chancellor's Professor of Mechanical and Aerospace Engineering at the University of California, Irvine (UCI) and former director of the National Fuel Cell Research Center from 2018 to 2022. Since 2022, he is director of the UCI Clean Energy Institute.

== Career ==
Brouwer studied mechanical engineering at the University of California, Irvine, where he earned a bachelor's degree in 1987 and a master's degree in 1989. He graduated with a doctorate in mechanical engineering from the Massachusetts Institute of Technology (MIT) in 1993, where he was also a postdoctoral research fellow.

In 1993, he left MIT to join the University of Utah as an assistant professor. He served as a member of the technical staff at Reaction Engineering International, a consulting firm, and as a staff scientist at Sandia National Laboratories. Brouwer joined UC Irvine in 1997 as the associate director of the National Fuel Cell Research Center. He became assistant professor of mechanical and aerospace engineering in 2011 before being appointed a chancellor's fellow in 2022 with joint appointments in Chemical and Biomolecular Engineering as well as Civil and Environmental Engineering.

His research focuses on high-temperature electrochemistry, hydrogen fuel cells, and electrolyzers. He also studies renewable energy system dynamics and infrastructure for hydrogen production and storage. His research applications focus primarily on the net-zero emissions systems and energy grid of California, where his work has informed policy on electric vehicles. He is a member of the Center for Hydrogen Safety at the American Institute of Chemical Engineers.
