= 2018 PRO Chess League season =

The 2018 PRO Chess League Season was the second season of the PRO Chess League. It began on January 17 and ended on April 8 with the Armenia Eagles defeating the Chengdu Pandas to claim their first title. This season introduced new qualifications to join the league and an all-star game.

== Qualification ==
In order to combat the large league, Shahade decided to cut the league from 48 teams to 32 teams as he believed the inaugural season was "a bit too large and chaotic".In order to determine which teams would return, he used the following:

- 24 teams invited
- 6 teams per Qualifier Tournament
- 2 teams per fan vote

=== Qualification tournament ===
The qualification tournament took place on November 3 with two qualifiers. The event format was a 13 round individual swiss (time control 3+2), with a team's score decided by summing the scores of their four team members. The top three teams from each qualifier automatically qualified, and the fourth to sixth placed teams were placed into a fan vote to decide the final qualifier.

First Qualifier (top 6)
Pos	Team
1	Armenia Eagles
2	Estonia Horses
3	(India) Mumbai Movers
4	(Norway) Oslo Trolls
5	(Netherlands) Apeldoorn Apes
6	(Israel) Rehovot Masters

Second Qualifier (top 6)
Pos	Team
1	(China) Chengdu Pandas
2	(United States) Seattle Sluggers
3	Australia Kangaroos
4	(United States) New York Knights
5	(United States) Minnesota Blizzard
6	(United States) San Francisco Mechanics

== Super Saturday and Super Sunday ==
For 2018, the PCL introduced a new match format which allowed teams to play outside of their division. In these matches, each team played one single four-game match against eight other teams. The standings were decided on game points, with the top 6 teams being awarded a match win and teams finishing 7th-10th being awarded a match draw. In addition, the winning team was awarded a $500 bonus.

2/24 Early Super Saturday
	Div	Team	Points	Result
1	A	(United States) St. Louis Arch Bishops	24	Win
2	P	(China) Chengdu Pandas	23	Win
3	A	(United States) Montclair Sopranos	21.5	Win
4	A	(United States) Pittsburgh Pawngrabbers	19.5	Win
5	P	(United States) Dallas Destiny	18.5	Win
6	P	(United States) Seattle Sluggers	18	Win
7	A	(Argentina) Buenos Aires Krakens	17	Draw
8	E	Armenia Eagles	16	Draw
9	E	(India) Delhi Dynamite	16	Draw
10	C	(Slovenia) Ljubljana Turtles	14	Draw
11	C	(Iceland) Reykjavik Puffins	13.5	Loss
12	P	(United States) Rio Grande Ospreys	13.5	Loss
13	E	(Russia) Volga Stormbringers	13	Loss
14	C	(France) Cannes Blockbusters	12.5	Loss
15	E	(India) Mumbai Movers	11	Loss
16	C	(France) Marseille Migraines	5	Loss

2/24 Late Super Saturday
	Div	Team	Points	Result
1	E	Norway Gnomes	21.5	Win
2	P	(United States) San Jose Hackers	20.5	Win
3	P	(United States) San Diego Surfers	19.5	Win
4	A	(United States) Webster Windmills	19.5	Win
5	P	Australia Kangaroos	19	Win
6	E	Estonia Horses	17.5	Win
7	A	(United States) Minnesota Blizzard	17.5	Draw
8	A	(United States) Miami Champions	17	Draw
9	A	(Canada) Montreal Chessbrahs	16	Draw
10	E	(Latvia) Riga Magicians	15	Draw
11	C	(Netherlands) Amsterdam Mosquitoes	14	Loss
12	C	(England) London Towers	13	Loss
13	E	(Norway) Oslo Trolls	13	Loss
14	C	(England) London Lions	12	Loss
15	C	(Sweden) Stockholm Snowballs	11.5	Loss
16	P	(United States) Las Vegas Desert Rats	9	Loss

2/4 Super Sunday
	Div	Team	Points	Result
1	E	Armenia Eagles	22	Win
2	E	(Russia) Volga Stormbringers	21.5	Win
3	C	(Slovenia) Ljubljana Turtles	21	Win
4	C	(France) Marseille Migraines	18.5	Win
5	C	(Sweden) Stockholm Snowballs	17.5	Win
6	E	(India) Mumbai Movers	17.5	Win
7	E	Norway Gnomes	17	Draw
8	E	(Latvia) Riga Magicians	16.5	Draw
9	E	(India) Delhi Dynamite	16	Draw
10	C	(England) London Lions	15	Draw
11	C	(Netherlands) Amsterdam Mosquitoes	15	Loss
12	C	(Iceland) Reykjavik Puffins	14.5	Loss
13	E	(Norway) Oslo Trolls	13.5	Loss
14	C	(England) London Towers	12.5	Loss
15	C	(France) Cannes Blockbusters	9	Loss
16	E	Estonia Horses	8.5	Loss

2/3 Super Saturday
	Div	Team	Points	Result
1	P	(United States) San Jose Hackers	21.5	Win
2	P	(China) Chengdu Pandas	20	Win
3	P	Australia Kangaroos	19.5	Win
4	A	(United States) Webster Windmills	19	Win
5	A	(Canada) Montreal Chessbrahs	18	Win
6	P	(United States) Dallas Destiny	18	Win
7	P	(United States) Rio Grande Ospreys	17.5	Draw
8	P	(United States) San Diego Surfers	16.5	Draw
9	A	(United States) Pittsburgh Pawngrabbers	16	Draw
10	A	(United States) Saint Louis Arch Bishops	15.5	Draw
11	P	(United States) Seattle Sluggers	15	Loss
12	A	(United States) Minnesota Blizzard	14.5	Loss
13	A	(United States) Montclair Sopranos	13.5	Loss
14	A	(United States) Miami Champions	11	Loss
15	P	(United States) Las Vegas Desert Rats	11	Loss
16	A	(Argentina) Buenos Aires Krakens	9.5	Loss

== Standings ==
The top four teams from each division qualify for the playoffs while the two worst teams are relegated from the league and will have to partake in the qualifiers in order to rejoin the league.

Eastern Division
	Teams	Wins	Loss	Game Points
1	Armenia Eagles	6.5	2.5	98
2	(India) Delhi Dynamite	5.5	3.5	95
3	(India) Mumbai Movers	5.5	3.5	85
4	Estonia Horses	5	4	88
5	Norway Gnomes	4	5	92
6	(Russia) Volga Stormbringers	4	5	88
7	(Latvia) Riga Magicians	3.5	5.5	81
8	(Norway) Oslo Trolls	2	7	75.5

Central Division
	Teams	Wins	Loss	Game Points
1	(Sweden) Stockholm Snowballs	6.5	2.5	90.5
2	(France) Marseille Migraines	6.5	2.5	87
3	(France) Cannes Blockbusters	5	4	78.5
4	(Slovenia) Ljubljana Turtles	4.5	4.5	89.5
5	(Netherlands) Amsterdam Mosquitoes	3	6	90
6	(England) London Lions	4	6	79.5
7	(Iceland) Reykjavik Puffins	2.5	6.5	78.5
8	(England) London Towers	1	8	71.5

Atlantic Division
	Teams	Wins	Loss	Game Points
1	(United States) Webster Windmills	7.5	1.5	99.5
2	(United States) Pittsburgh Pawngrabbers	7	2	98
3	(United States) St. Louis Arch Bishops	5.5	3.5	101
4	(United States) Minnesota Blizzard	5.5	3.5	92
5	(United States) Montclair Sopranos	4	5	85.5
6	(United States) Miami Champions	3	6	83
7	(Canada) Montreal ChessBrahs	2.5	6.5	83
8	(Argentina) Buenos Aires Krakens	2	7	73.5

Pacific Division
	Teams	Wins	Loss	Game Points
1	(United States) San Diego Surfers	7.5	1.5	99
2	(China) Chengdu Pandas	6.5	2.5	104
3	(United States) Dallas Destiny	6.5	2.5	100
4	Australia Kangaroos	5	4	94.5
5	(United States) San Jose Hackers	4.5	4.5	97.5
6	(United States) Seattle Sluggers	4.5	4.5	86
7	(United States) Rio Grande Ospreys	3.5	5.5	84.5
8	(United States) Las Vegas Desert Rats	1	8	60.5

== Playoffs ==
After the regular season, the top four teams from each division qualified for the playoffs with the teams being seeded 1–4 in their division. In addition, the teams that won their division were invited to play the final two round in San Francisco at the Folsom Street Foundry.

Division Semifinals; March 13
E1	Armenia Eagles	10.5
E4	Estonia Horses	5.5
Eastern
E2	(India) Delhi Dynamite	7.5
E3	(India) Mumbai Movers	8.5
A1	(United States) Webster Windmills	7.5
A4	(United States) Minnesota Blizzard	8.5
Atlantic
A2	(United States) Pittsburgh Pawngrabbers	6
A3	(United States) St. Louis Arch Bishops	10
P1	(United States) San Diego Surfers	5.5
P4	Australia Kangaroos	10.5
Pacific
P2	(China) Chengdu Pandas	8*
P3	(United States) Dallas Destiny	8
C1	(Sweden) Stockholm Snowballs	7.5
C4	(Slovenia) Ljubljana Turtles	8.5
Central
C2	(France) Marseille Migraines	9
C3	(France) Cannes Blockbusters	7

Division Championship; March 21
E1	Armenia Eagles	8*
E3	(India) Mumbai Movers	8
A4	(United States) Minnesota Blizzard	6
A3	(United States) St. Louis Arch Bishops	10
P4	Australia Kangaroos	7
P2	(China) Chengdu Pandas	9
C4	(Slovenia) Ljubljana Turtles	9.5
C2	(France) Marseille Migraines	6.5

Semifinals; April 7 San Francisco
E1	Armenia Eagles	8.5
A3	(United States) St. Louis Arch Bishops	7.5
P2	(China) Chengdu Pandas	9.5
C4	(Slovenia) Ljubljana Turtles	6.5

PCL Championship; April 8 San Francisco
E1	Armenia Eagles	12***
P2	(China) Chengdu Pandas	11
Third place match
A3	(United States) St. Louis Arch Bishops	9.5
C4	(Slovenia) Ljubljana Turtles	6.5

- *Advanced due to higher seed
- ***Triple overtime victory

== Awards ==
All Stars
Division	Player	Team
Eastern	(Norway) Magnus Carlsen	Norway Gnomes
Eastern	(Armenia) Hrant Melkumyan	Armenia Eagles
Eastern	(Armenia) Zaven Andriasyan	Armenia Eagles
Eastern	(India) Viswanathan Anand	(India) Mumbai Movers
Central	(France) Maxime Vachier-Lagrave	(France) Marseille Migraines
Central	(Germany) Georg Meier	(Sweden) Stockholm Snowballs
Central	(Slovenia) Luka Lenic	(Slovenia) Ljubljana Turtles
Central	(England) Gawain Jones	(England) London Towers
Atlantic	(United States) Fabiano Caruana	(United States) St. Louis Arch Bishops
Atlantic	(Russia) Aleksandr Shimanov	(United States) Webster Windmills
Atlantic	(United States) Awonder Liang	(United States) Pittsburgh Pawngrabbers
Atlantic	(United States) Andrew Tang	(United States) Minnesota Blizzard
Pacific	(United States) Hikaru Nakamura	(United States) Seattle Slggers
Pacific	(China) Yu Yangyi	(China) Chengdu Pandas
Pacific	(Russia) Alexey Dreev	(United States) San Diego Surfers
Pacific	(Australia) Anton Smirnov	Australia Kangaroos

Individual Performances
Award	Player	Team
MVP (gold)	(United States) Fabiano Caruana	(United States) St. Louis Arch Bishops
MVP (silver)	(Norway) Magnus Carlsen	Norway Gnomes
MVP (bronze)	(United States) Hikaru Nakamura	(United States) Seattle Sluggers
Best Female	(China) Ju Wenjun	(China) Chengdu Pandas
U2600	(Armenia) Zaven Andriasyan	Armenia Eagles
U2500	(United States) Andrew Tang	(United States) Minnesota Blizzard
U2400	(England) Brandon Clarke	Australia Kangaroos
U2300	(Armenia) Artak Manukyan	Armenia Eagles
U2200	(Estonia) Sander Kukk	Estonia Horses

== All-Star Game ==
The 2018 All-Star Game was on September 8 with stage 1 and on September 9 for stage 2. The following event format was used.

- Stage 1: Round-robin tournament where every player plays one game against everyone else from other three teams, total of 12 games (Time control = 3|1)
- Stage 2: Knockout round. Seeding determined by total number of points in stage 1 (Time control = 3|0)

First round
3	Central Division	2
4	Eastern Division	4

Second round
2	Atlantic Division	4
4	Eastern Division	2

Final
1	Pacific Division	4
2	Atlantic Division	3
