= Sergey Kudrin =

American chess grandmaster (born 1959)

- Kudrin at the World Open chess tournament

Personal information
- Born: September 7, 1959 (age 67) Novosibirsk, Soviet Union

Chess career
- Country: United States (after 1978); Soviet Union (before 1978)
- Title: Grandmaster (1984)
- Peak rating: 2580 (July 1992)
- Peak ranking: No. 32 (July 1984)

Sergey Kudrin (born September 7, 1959) is a Soviet-American chess Grandmaster.

== Career ==
He achieved his Grandmaster title in 1984 going on to win chess tournaments at Copenhagen in 1983, and Beer-Sheva in 1984, and Torremolinos in 1985. Kudrin tied for first place in the 1986 and 1987 U.S. Masters Chess Championships. He played in the 1999 Las Vegas FIDE Chess World Championship seeded 70th, the 2004 FIDE World Chess Championship held in Tripoli, Libya, where he was seeded 92nd and the 2005 Chess World Cup at Khanty-Mansiysk, Russia seeded 102nd.

In the United States Kudrin won third place in the 2008 Frank K. Berry United States Chess Championship in Tulsa, Oklahoma in 2008. He is also third in the 2008 World Chess Live Grand Prix standings. He has also been a valued member on the United States Chess League in 2007 and 2008. Kudrin won the United States Open Championship in 1984 and 2007.

Kudrin often has encouraged chess activities such as recruiting GM Boris Spassky to join the Western States Open in 2004 and 2005.

One of his former pupils was bandy and floorball player Alexander Hart.
