= 2017 PRO Chess League season =

1st season of the PRO Chess League

The 2017 PRO Chess League Season was the inaugural season of the PRO Chess League. It started on January 11, 2017, and ended March 26. 48 teams participated, twelve of which had previously participated in the USCL. After the end of the first season, the St. Louis Arch Bishops defeated the Norway Gnomes, thus securing their first title. The PCL has a total prize fund of $50,000 compared to a prize fund of $10,000 in the USCL.

== Standings ==
Eastern Division
	W	L	TB	GP
(India) Delhi Dynamite	5	2	20.5	65.5
(Hungary) Budapest Gambit	4.5	2.5	24.5	62
(Russia) Gorky Stormbringers	4.5	2.5	19	61
Norway Gnomes	3.5	3.5	28	60
(India) Mumbai Movers	3.5	3.5	27	54
(Latvia) Riga Magicians	3.5	3.5	25.5	56.5
(Slovenia) Ljubljana Direwolves	3.5	3.5	24.5	51.5
(Serbia) Belgrade Sparrows	3.5	3.5	18.5	62.5
(India) Odisha Express	2	5	20	45
(India) Amaravati Yodhas	1.5	5.5	16	48.5
(Kazakhstan) Shymkent Nomads	1	6	23	44.5
(South Africa) Johannesburg Koeksisters	1	6	20.5	40

Central Division
	W	L	TB	GP
(France) Marseille Migraines	5	2	27	67
(Sweden) Stockholm Snowballs	5	2	24	62.5
(Netherlands) Amsterdam Mosquitoes	4	3	26	58.5
(France) Cannes Blockbusters	4	3	25.5	56
(United Kingdom) London Lions	4	3	25	55.5
(United Kingdom) London Towers	4	3	23	68
(Germany) Hamburg Swashbucklers	3.5	3.5	25	53.5
(Netherlands) Apeldoorn Apes	3	4	21	56.5
(Iceland) Reykjavik Puffins	2.5	4.5	23.5	62
(Republic of Ireland) Dublin Desperados	2	5	19.5	56.5
(Nigeria) Abuja Rockstars	2	5	17.5	39
(Nigeria) Lagos Leatherbacks	0	7	21.5	26.5

Atlantic Division
	W	L	TB	GP
(Canada) Montreal ChessBrahs	6	1	27	65.5
(Argentina) Buenos Aires Krakens	5	2	27	58.5
(Canada) Toronto Dragons	5	2	26.5	71
(United States) Montclair Sopranos	5	2	22.5	66
(United States) Philadelphia Inventors	4.5	2.5	26.5	62
(United States) Miami Champions	4	3	22	62
(United States) New Jersey Knockouts	3.5	3.5	27	55
(United States) New York Knights	3	4	28	55.5
(Argentina) Patagonia Penguins	3	4	23	50
(United States) Atlanta Kings	2.5	4.5	25.5	56.5
(United States) Carolina Cobras	2	5	21	42.5
(United States) Columbus Cardinals	0	7	23.5	26.5

Pacific Division
	W	L	TB	GP
(United States) St. Louis Arch Bishops	6	1	29.5	70.5
(United States) Webster Windmills	6	1	27.5	68.5
(United States) Dallas Destiny	5.5	1.5	29	67
(United States) San Diego Surfers	5.5	1.5	26	68
(United States) Rio Grande Ospreys	5	2	31	58.5
(United States) San Jose Hackers	4	3	33.5	59
(United States) Las Vegas Desert Rats	3.5	3.5	29	59.5
(United States) Minnesota Blizzard	3	4	28.5	51
(United States) Seattle Sluggers	3	4	25	57
(United States) San Francisco Mechanics	3	4	23	52.5
(United States) Pittsburgh Pawngrabbers	3	4	21.5	47
(United States) Portland Rain	1.5	5.5	27	36.5

== Playoffs ==
After the end of the regular season, the top six teams from each division qualify for the playoffs with each team being seeded 1–6 based on regular season wins.

=== Eastern division ===
Division Quarterfinals
4	Norway Gnomes	9
5	(India) Mumbai Movers	7
3	(Russia) Gorky Stormbringers	8
6	(Latvia) Riga Magicians	8

Division Semifinals
1	(India) Delhi Dynamite	6.5
4	Norway Gnomes	9.5
2	(Hungary) Budapest Gambit	6.5
3	(Russia) Gorky Stormbringers	9.5

Division Championship
4	Norway Gnomes	9.5
3	(Russia) Gorky Stormbringers	6.5

=== Central division ===
Division Quarterfinals
4	(France) Cannes Blockbusters	7
5	(United Kingdom) London Lions	9
3	(Netherlands) Amsterdam Mosquitoes	7.5
6	(United Kingdom) London Towers	8.5

Division Semifinals
1	(France) Marseille Migraines	10.5
5	(United Kingdom) London Lions	5.5
2	(Sweden) Stockholm Snowballs	8.5
6	(United Kingdom) London Towers	7.5

Division Championship
1	(France) Marseille Migraines	6.5
2	(Sweden) Stockholm Snowballs	9.5

=== Atlantic division ===
Division Quarterfinals
4	(United States) Montclair Sopranos	9
5	(United States) Philadelphia Inventors	7
3	(Canada) Toronto Dragons	7.5
6	(United States) Miami Champions	8.5

Division Semifinals
1	(Canada) Montreal Chessbrahs	9
4	(United States) Montclair Sopranos	7
2	(Argentina) Buenos Aires Krakens	10
6	(United States) Miami Champions	6

Division Championship
1	(Canada) Montreal Chessbrahs	10
2	(Argentina) Buenos Aires Krakens	6

=== Pacific division ===
Division Quarterfinals
4	(United States) San Diego Surfers	9.5
5	(United States) Rio Grande Ospreys	6.5
3	(United States) Dallas Destiny	7.5
6	(United States) San Jose Hackers	8.5

Division Semifinals
1	(United States) St. Louis Arch Bishops	8.5
4	(United States) San Diego Surfers	7.5
2	(United States) Webster Windmills	9.5
6	(United States) San Jose Hackers	6.5

Division Championship
1	(United States) St. Louis Arch Bishops	8
2	(United States) Webster Windmills	8

=== Semifinals and championship ===
During the semifinal round, regardless of the participating teams, the winner of the Eastern Division played the winner of the Central Division, and the winner of the Atlantic Division played the winner of the Pacific Division.

Semifinals
E4	Norway Gnomes	10
C2	(Sweden) Stockholm Snowballs	6
A1	(Canada) Montreal Chessbrahs	8 (8, 1)
P1	(United States) St. Louis Arch Bishops	8 (8, 3)

PCL Championship
E4	Norway Gnomes	7
P1	(United States) St. Louis Arch Bishops	9

== Awards ==
Award	Player	Team
MVP (gold)	(United States) Wesley So	(United States) St. Louis Arch Bishops
MVP (silver)	(Norway) Magnus Carlsen	Norway Gnomes
MVP (bronze)	(Germany) Georg Meier	(Sweden) Stockholm Snowballs
Best Female	(Lithuania) Deimante Daulyte	(France) Cannes Blockbusters
U2600	(France) Yannick Gozzoli	(France) Marseille Migraines
U2500	(Canada) Nikolay Noritsyn	(Canada) Toronto Dragons
U2400	(Netherlands) Nico Zwirs	(Netherlands) Apeldoorn Apes
U2300	(United States) Richard Francisco	(United States) Atlanta Kings
U2200	(United States) Nicholas Rosenthal	(United States) St. Louis Arch Bishops
