= Scott Samuelsen =

American engineer (born 1942)

- Born: Gary Scott Samuelsen; December 7, 1942 (age 83); Pasadena, California, U.S.
- Spouse: Sharon Samuelsen

Academic background
- Education: University of California, Berkeley (BS, MS, PhD)

Academic work
- Institutions: University of California, Irvine; National Fuel Cell Research Center
- Main interests: Renewable energy; fuel cell; electrochemistry

Gary Scott Samuelsen (born December 7, 1942) is an American engineer who specializes in fuel cell and renewable energy technology. He is the Horiba Distinguished Emeritus Professor of Mechanical, Aerospace, and Environmental Engineering at the University of California, Irvine (UCI) and founding director of the National Fuel Cell Research Center. He pioneered the octane rating method adopted in the United States and was named a White House “Champion of Change” in 2011.

== Early life and education ==
Samuelsen was born in 1942 to Doris and Rube Samuelsen, a Rose Bowl sports journalist. He was raised in Pasadena, California in the 1950s at a time when the Los Angeles Basin was affected by severe smog from car emissions and persistent air quality problems prior to the enactment of vehicle emission standards. This experience helped him develop an early interest in air pollution and its effects on public health. His proximity to the Santa Fe Depot in Pasadena inspired a passion for trains and aviation.

He attended the University of California, Berkeley, where he studied mechanical engineering. He interned at Southern California Edison in 1962, working on power generating stations in western San Bernardino and Huntington Beach. He also interned at DuPont in 1963, where he studied the role of lead in gasoline and the Rankine cycle automobile engine in South Carolina and Delaware. He graduated with a bachelor's degree in 1964.

Before attending graduate school, Samuelsen worked on nuclear fission at Lawrence Livermore National Laboratory in 1964. He was also affiliated with the Stanford Research Institute, where he conducted underground nuclear energy experiments at the Nevada Test Site. He returned to Berkeley to study the combustion of alternative fuels for automobiles, graduating with a Master of Engineering degree in 1965. While a student, served as a graduate student instructor for an undergraduate course on propulsion, sparking an interest in pedagogy.

As a doctoral student, his research focused on reducing emissions from gas turbine engines, then emergent as aircraft propulsion technology and a candidate for electricity generation. He focused on characterizing the performance and emissions from an ammonia and air opposed reaction jet, graduating with a doctorate in mechanical engineering from Berkeley in 1970.

== Career ==
In July 1970, Samuelsen joined the faculty of the University of California, Irvine as an assistant professor. He helped establish the Mechanical Engineering program (precursor to the Mechanical and Aerospace Engineering Department) from 1972 to 1983. He attained tenure in 1976 and become a full professor in 1982, later becoming chair of the Department of Mechanical and Aerospace Engineering from 1985 to 1988.

Samuelsen was the founding director of the Advanced Power and Energy Program in 2000, which he led until 2020. He was also founding director of the National Fuel Cell Research Center (NFCRC) in 1998 and established UCI’s Combustion Laboratory, serving as director of both until 2018. He was appointed Horiba Distinguished Professor by the UC Irvine Henry Samueli School of Engineering and held joint appointments in Civil and Environmental Engineering.

His research focused on combustion technology for stationary and propulsive applications and particularly on fuel cells, hydrogen infrastructure, fuel cell vehicles. He directed research on zero emission coal and natural gas power plants for the production of hydrogen and electricity. He published over 300 books and scientific articles in major journals.

Samuelsen founded the California Stationary Fuel Cell Collaborative. In April 2004, he was invited to join the advisory panel that developed Governor Arnold Schwarzenegger's California Hydrogen Highway Network Initiative. He pioneered the development of octane posting with the Federal Trade Commission and was responsible for the popular (R+M)/2 posting methodology used globally for internal combustion engines and vehicle fuels. Under his direction, the NFCRC helped to launch what the Department of Energy called the "fuel station of the future,” a fuel cell and hydrogen energy station for clean cars in Fountain Valley, California. In 2011, he was recognized by President Barack Obama as a "Champion of Change".

He retired in 2021 as Horiba Distinguished Emeritus Professor.

== Personal life ==
Samuelsen is married to Sharon Samuelsen, a UC Berkeley graduate in design and art history. They have three children. He is active in outdoor recreation and renewable energy initiatives in California.
