= 2019 PRO Chess League season =

The 2019 PRO Chess League Season was the third season of the PRO Chess League. It started on November 9 with the qualification tournament in order to decide the expansion teams and ended on May 5. During the regular season, teams played one match against every other team in their division and three interdivisional series.

The Saint Louis Arch Bishops won their second PRO Chess League title by defeating the Baden-Baden Snowballs with a score of 10–6.

== Qualification tournament ==
The qualification tournament took place on November 3 with two qualifiers. The event format was stated on the PRO Chess League website.

- 13 round individual Swiss using time format of three minutes with two seconds of increment.
- Scores determined by adding sum of scores from all four team members
- Top 2 teams from each qualifying tournament automatically qualify for PCL

First Qualifier
	Team
1	Moscow Wizards
2	Tbilisi Gentlemen
3	Moscow Phoenix
4	Berlin Bears
5	Bergamo Gladiators
6	Kazan Archers
7	Riga Magicians*
8	Kharkiv Lawyers

Second Qualifier
	Team
1	San Francisco Mechanics
2	Montreal Chessbrahs
3	New York Marshalls
4	Barcelona Raptors
5	Atlanta Kings
6	Chicago Coyotes
7	London Towers*
8	Paris Musketeers

*Won fan vote to qualify for Stage 2
