= Asa Hoffmann =

American chess player (born 1943)

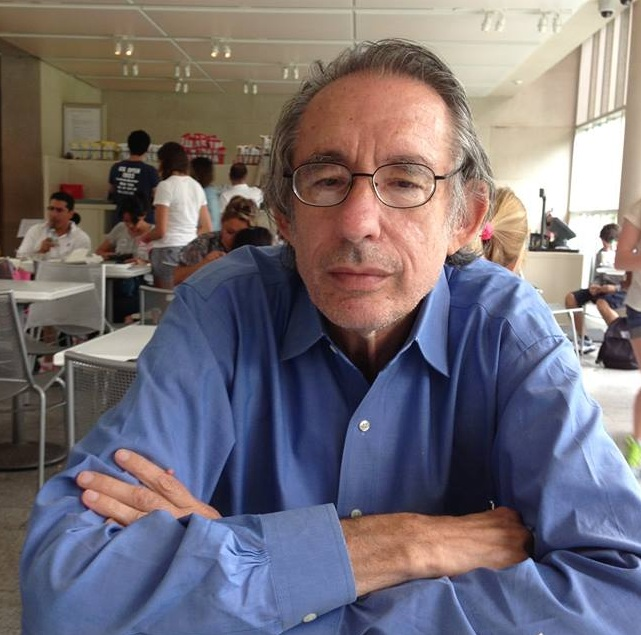
- Hoffmann in 2013

Personal information
- Born: February 25, 1943 (age 83) New York City, New York, U.S.

Chess career
- Country: United States
- Title: FIDE Master (1981)
- Peak rating: 2365 (January 1982)

Asa Hoffmann (born February 25, 1943) is a FIDE Master in chess, chess teacher and author from the United States of America. He is known as "the sparring partner of champions". His peak regular USCF rating is 2471, his peak quick rating is 2515 and his peak blitz rating is 2414.

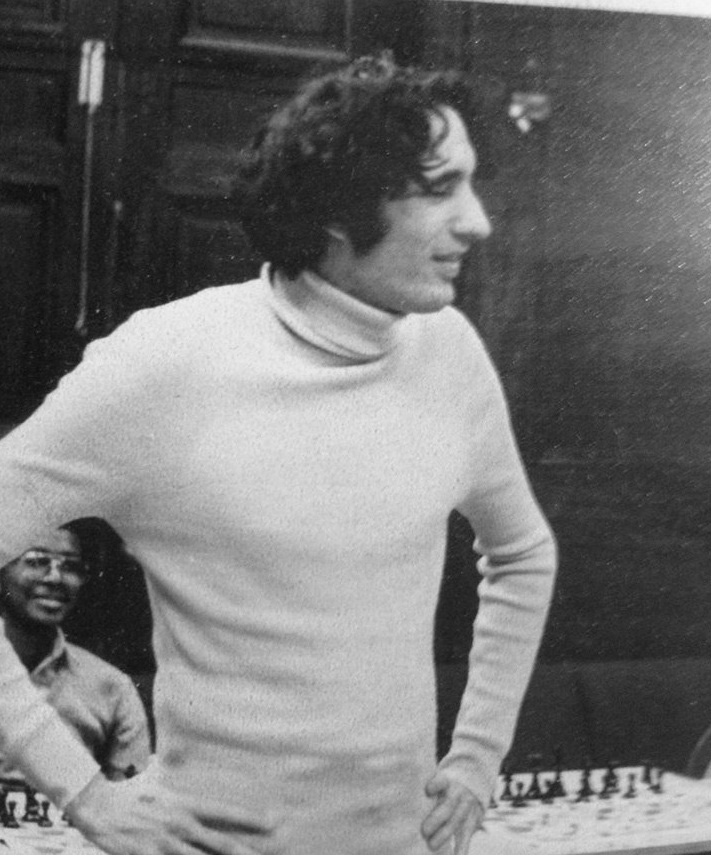
Chess Simul NYC (1980)

Hoffmann is interviewed in the documentary Bobby Fischer Against the World along with Anthony Saidy, Larry Evans, and Susan Polgar. In 1987 he was profiled in The New York Times.

The winner of the New York City junior championship in 1962 and the first army championship in 1966, by the age of 21 Hoffmann was ranked number 21 in the nation. His natural tactical flair and strong positional understanding made him a dangerous opponent even to top Grandmasters. Hoffmann went on to have more than a 50-year chess career, winning hundreds of tournaments and playing against most of the top ranked U.S. Grandmasters as well as many world championship contenders. He was vice president of the Manhattan Chess Club. He was a member of the board of governors of the Marshall Chess Club in New York City.

A colorful figure on the New York City chess scene, Hoffmann was the son of two attorneys, Mercedes Solomon Hoffmann and David Hoffmann and grew up on Park Avenue. He attended Hunter College Elementary School, Horace Mann School and Columbia University. His parents had hopes he would become an attorney but Hoffmann had other plans and after a year at Columbia, dropped out to play chess full-time. The talented young Hoffmann was able to make a modest living playing blitz chess for money in the clubs and parks and was good friends with future world chess champion Bobby Fischer, who also enjoyed playing blitz chess for money. The two played countless blitz games together but Hoffmann concedes that only rarely was he able to win a game against Fischer.

Hoffmann began teaching chess students at the age of 18 years and has continued teaching students to this day. As of April 2016, Hoffmann was the top ranked senior blitz player in the U.S. He also holds the titles of U.S. Life Master and U.S. Senior Master. In 1981 he was awarded the international chess title of FIDE Master (FM). In 2015, Hoffmann played a blitz match against IM Jay Bonin billed as the "Gladiator" vs. the "Iron Man". Iron Man Jay Bonin won 8 - 5. In 2016, a book was published about the match, entitled "Ironman vs. Gladiator".

Hoffmann describes himself as a games master, being a master in chess, as well as backgammon, bridge, Scrabble and poker. Specializing in blitz chess, he has been described by Yasser Seirawan as "a near legendary figure in the New York City chess world" and a collection of his games entitled The Chess Gladiator (Intl Chess Enterprises, 1996) includes a blitz win against Bobby Fischer. Hoffmann has also authored a book about his signature Czech Benoni chess opening entitled The Czech Benoni in Action (with Greg Keener, Mongoose Press, 2014), and is working on an update of his earlier book The Chess Gladiator as well as a book of his memoirs. His book "The Last Gamesman" was published in 2022. It is a book of reminiscences about a lifetime spent playing games in New York City.

Hoffmann was portrayed in the film Searching for Bobby Fischer by Austin Pendleton; Hoffmann himself refused to be involved in the film, disappointed with the depiction of himself as socially inept and obsessive.

In 1987 he married his long-time girlfriend, chess photographer and actress Eva Veronika Klein; the two were together until her death in 2007. On February 24, 2014, Hoffmann married fellow chess player Virginia D'Amico Hoffmann. Their wedding reception was held at the Marshall Chess Club. The two had dated 37 years earlier and were reunited in 2013 through mutual friends. They lived in the Gramercy Park area of Manhattan in New York City.
