= Tandem simultaneous exhibition =

Type of simultaneous chess

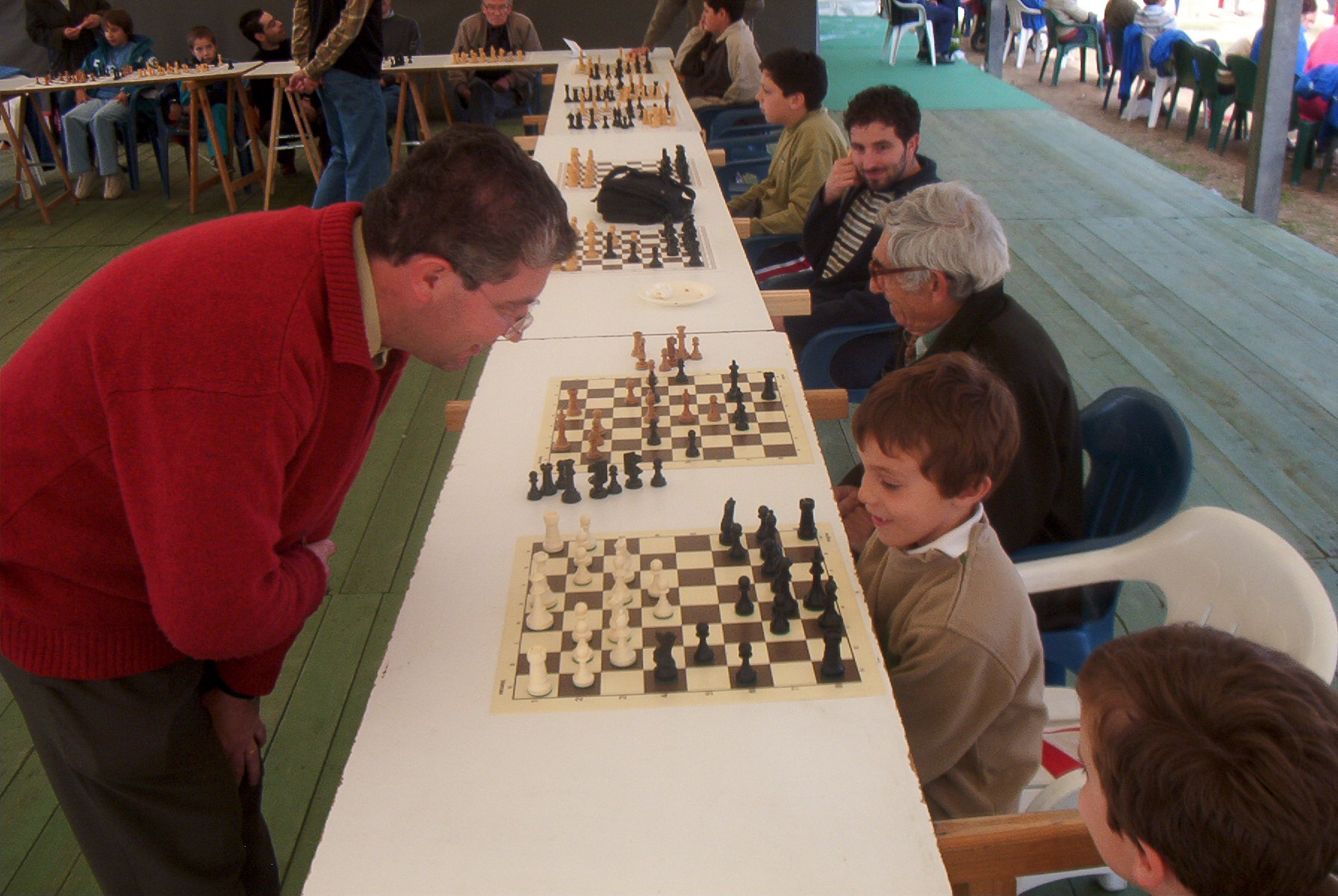
Josep Romero simultaneous, 2003

A tandem simultaneous exhibition or leapfrog simultaneous exhibition or partnership chess is a form of simultaneous exhibition in which more than one player (typically of high rank, such as a grandmaster or dan-level player) play multiple games at a time with a number of other players, making successive moves without consulting one another. Such an exhibition is often referred to simply as a "tandem simul" or "leapfrog simul". When conducted by more than two experts, it is often called a sequential simul.

== History ==
The earliest recorded tandem chess happened in 1892. The following passage below appeared on page 8 of the Chess Review, September 1892:

London. A novel exhibition of simultaneous play took place recently at the private house of a chess enthusiast in the West End of London. On the occasion in question, Mr Lee and a first-class London amateur played simultaneously in partnership against eight opponents, three of whom were ladies. The two simultaneous performers walked from board to board, and moved alternately and without consultation, the amateur pedestrian making the odd moves for White and Mr Lee the even moves for White in each game. Several interesting and dashing parties took place, the King’s and Evans’ gambits being adopted in most cases and, after an amusing and well-contested encounter, the simultaneous partners were victorious by five wins to three. The whole performance proved very interesting to both players and spectators, and similar matches have been arranged for the future.

The London Chess Classic festival regularly includes a sequential simul where the grandmasters in the regular tournament play against public. In 2012, eight grandmasters –David Howell, Luke McShane, Magnus Carlsen, Hikaru Nakamura, Michael Adams, Vladimir Kramnik, Levon Aronian and Viswanathan Anand– played 18 tables, each table consisting seven players consulting.

== Blindfold tandem simul ==
In 1934, former world chess champion Alexander Alekhine teamed with Salo Landau in Rotterdam and gave a blindfold tandem performance: they, playing blindfold and without consulting each other, faced six pairs of strong consulting opponents, scoring +2, -3, =1. Alekhine repeated this a few weeks later, this time teaming up with George Koltanowski in Antwerp, scoring +3, -1, =2.
