= Alexander Hart (floorball) =

Swedish sportsman

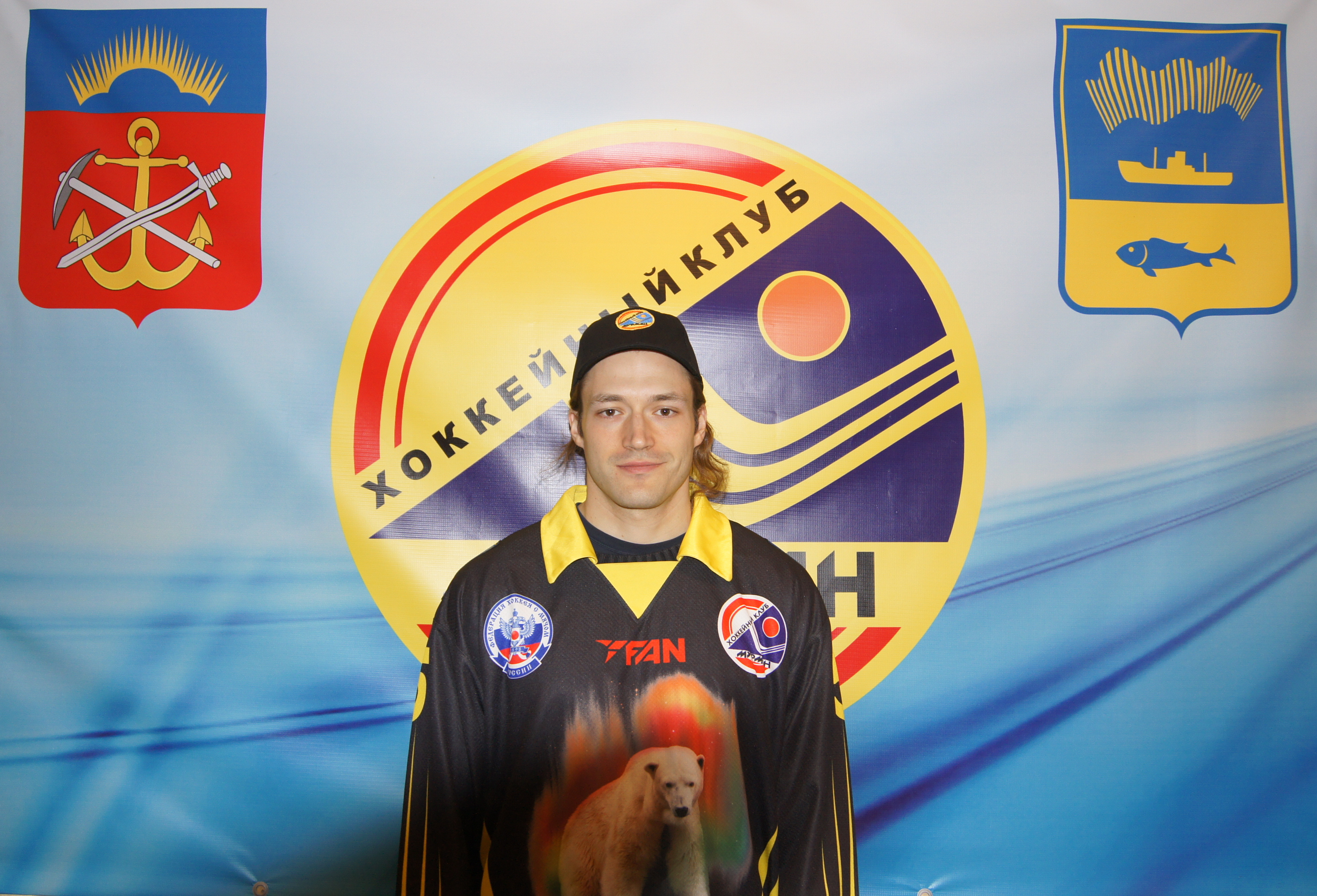

Personal information
- Born: 17 September 1985 (age 40) Stockholm, Sweden
- Height: 1.88 m (6 ft 2 in)
- Playing position: Forward

Senior career*
Years	Team	Apps^{†}	(Gls)^{†}
2009–2010	Ullevål IL		
2012–2013	Stabaek IF		
2013–2014	Narukerä		
2014–2015	IFK Motala		
2015–2016	Murman		
- * Senior club appearances and goals counted for the domestic league only and correct as of 9 April 2017. † Appearances (Goals). ‡ National team caps and goals correct as of 9 April 2017

Alexander Hart (born 17 September 1985) is a Swedish-American bandy and floorball player.

He has represented bandy clubs in Norway, Finland, Sweden and Russia. In 2016, he won the Russian Floorball silver medal with Spartak Moscow. Later that same year he represented Team USA at the 2016 Men's World Floorball Championships, and in 2017 he transferred to Czech floorball club FBC Česká Lípa. In chess, he was a pupil of German International Master Matthias Duppel and Russian Grandmaster Sergey Kudrin. His great-grandfather was Swedish brain surgeon and bandy player Herbert Olivecrona.
