= Pascal Charbonneau =

Canadian chess grandmaster (born 1983)

Personal information
- Born: May 6, 1983 (age 43) Montreal, Quebec
- Spouse: Irina Krush (m. 2007, divorced)

Chess career
- Country: Canada
- Title: Grandmaster (2006)
- FIDE rating: 2509 (October 2026)
- Peak rating: 2517 (March 2011)

Pascal Charbonneau (born May 6, 1983, in Montreal) is a Canadian chess grandmaster. He has won two Canadian Chess Championships, in 2002 and 2004, and has represented Canada in five Chess Olympiads: 2000, 2002, 2004, 2006 and 2008.

== Early years ==
Charbonneau was introduced to chess through the Chess'n Math Association's scholastic programs in Montreal, when he was in grade one. He showed talent and, coached by FIDE Master Richard Bérubé, he won a number of provincial and national grade school championships over the next several years.

Reaching National Master strength by age 14, Charbonneau shared 2nd-3rd places in the Canadian Cadet Championship (under 16) at Victoria 1997 with 6.5/9. A few months later, he made a big step forward when he placed 2nd in the 1997–98 Junior Canadian Chess Championship in Winnipeg with 9/11.

In 1998, he won the Canadian Cadet (Under 16) Championship in Saskatoon with 7/9. Then, he won the 1998–99 Junior Canadian Championship in Vancouver with 10/11. This qualified him into the 1999 World Junior Championship at Yerevan, where he scored 6/13. Charbonneau won the 1999 Canadian Youth Championship (U16 group) at Vancouver with 4.5/5. He tied for 1st-2nd places, with Danny Goldenberg, in the 1999–2000 Canadian Junior Championship in Montreal, and won the playoff game against Goldenberg.

He won the 2000 Youth Championship, Boys' Under 18 group, in Calgary with 5.5/6, and followed up by winning the knockout-style provincial Quebec Championship that same year.

Charbonneau defeated Igor Miladinović by 3.5-2.5 in a 2000 exhibition match in Montreal that was widely reported. He then won the 2000–01 Canadian Junior Championship in Montreal with 6.5/8, as well as winning the 2001 Youth Championship at Sackville with a perfect score of 7/7. A below-average result was his shared 4th-6th place in the 2001–02 Canadian Junior Championship at Winnipeg with 5/8.

== Olympiads ==
Charbonneau earned his first Canadian national team selection at the age of 17 in 2000, and played for Canada in the next four Chess Olympiads as well. He earned his FIDE Master title from his performance at Istanbul 2000, as well as from the Montreal International a few months earlier. His aggregate is +14 =12 -17, including a victory over Viswanathan Anand at Turin.

- Istanbul 2000: board 4, 4.5/9 (+2 =5 -2)
- Bled 2002: board 3, 6/11 (+5 =2 -4)
- Calvià 2004: board 1, 5/12 (+3 =4 -5)
- Turin 2006: board 1, 4.5/11 (+4 =1 -6)
- Dresden 2008: board 2, 6/9 (+5 =2 -2)

== Chess scholarship ==
Charbonneau earned a chess scholarship to the University of Maryland, Baltimore County, beginning in 2001, and represented that school in the Pan American Intercollegiate Team Chess Championship. He worked on his chess with Alexander Onischuk. In the fall of 2005 he played Board 1 on the winning Baltimore Kingfishers team in the online United States Chess League and won the Most Valuable Player award. He studied mathematics and finance, graduating in 2006 to work as a financial analyst in private industry.

== Canadian Champion ==
Charbonneau won the 2002 Zonal Canadian Chess Championship at Richmond, British Columbia. He tied for 1st-2nd places with Kevin Spraggett with 8.5/11, then won the two-game playoff match 1.5–0.5. Charbonneau earned the International Master title for his victory. He shared 1st-3rd places in the 2002 Canadian Open Chess Championship in Montreal with 8/10, along with Jean-Marc Degraeve and Jean Hébert.

Charbonneau made his first grandmaster norm at the Montreal International 2003, where he scored 6.5/11 for 5th place with 9 GMs in the field. Shortly afterwards, he scored his second norm in the Americas Continental Championship at Buenos Aires 2003, where shared 3rd-8th place with 8/11. He lost 2-0 to Alexey Dreev in his world championship first-round knockout match at Tripoli 2005.

== Grandmaster ==
Charbonneau won his second Zonal Canadian Chess Championship at Toronto 2004, again in a playoff. He tied with Eric Lawson on 7/9, then won the two-game playoff match 2–0. He scored his final GM norm by winning the 2006 Chicago Winter Invitational with 6/9. In the Zonal Canadian Chess Championship at Toronto 2006, Charbonneau shared 2nd-5th places with 6.5/9, behind new champion Igor Zugic.

The story of his becoming a grandmaster is recounted in King's Gambit: A Son, A Father and the World's Most Dangerous Game, by Paul Hoffman. The book also discusses Charbonneau's 2-0 loss to Étienne Bacrot at the 2004 FIDE World Championship in Tripoli, as well as his relationship with Irina Krush.

Charbonneau's younger sister, Anne-Marie Charbonneau, won the 2002–2003 Canadian Junior Girls' Championship and was a member of the winning team from the University of Montreal at the 2006 Canadian Post-Secondary Championships in Montreal.

== Notable chess games ==
- Igor Miladinovic vs Pascal Charbonneau, Montreal match 2000, game 4, Queen's Indian Defence (A47) 0-1 As an untitled player facing a grandmaster, Charbonneau scores an upset win.
- Pascal Charbonneau vs Viorel Iordachescu, Bled Olympiad 2002, Modern Defence (B06), 1-0 A close struggle with Charbonneau coming out on top after the Moldovan grandmaster errs on move 41.
- Pascal Charbonneau vs Gilberto Milos, Americas Continental Championship, Buenos Aires 2003, Caro-Kann Defence, Advance Variation (B12), 1-0 The strong Brazilian GM loses in a major upset as Charbonneau scores his second GM norm.
- Pascal Charbonneau vs Alexander Huzman, Montreal International 2005, Sicilian Defence, Najdorf Variation (B96), 1-0 Very nice positional victory over the experienced Israeli GM.
- Eugene Perelshteyn vs Pascal Charbonneau, Chicago Winter Invitational 2006, Sicilian Defence, Dragon Variation, Yugoslav Attack (B78), 0-1 A key win from the event where Charbonneau became a grandmaster.
- Pascal Charbonneau vs Viswanathan Anand, Turin Olympiad 2006, Sicilian Defence, Paulsen Variation (B44), 1-0 Anand attacks and Charbonneau defends precisely with a brilliant finish.
