= Boylston Chess Club =

Chess club in Boston, Massachusetts

- Type: Regional Chess Club
- Founded: August 27, 1919
- Location: 35 Kingston Street, Boston, Massachusetts
- Country: United States
- Membership: 468
- Website: Official Website

The Boylston Chess Club is a chess club based in Boston, Massachusetts. Founded on August 27, 1919, at the Boston Young Men's Christian Union, it is one of the oldest continuously operating chess clubs in the United States. The club is operated by the Boylston Chess Foundation, a nonprofit organization established in 2005. It is the largest chess club in Boston and among the most active in the country, hosting frequent tournaments and events for players of all levels.

== History ==
The club traces its origins to the Boston Young Men's Christian Union, which had a small room for chess starting from the 1850s. Players such as Constant Ferdinand Burille and Harry Nelson Pillsbury visited regularly in the late 1890s. The club was formally established in 1919, with 22 charter members and Augustus Seaver serving as its first president. In 1945, the club became affiliate #51 of the newly formed United States Chess Federation.

In 1989, the club relocated to the 8th floor of the Young Women's Christian Association (YWCA) at 140 Clarendon Street, Boston, due to increasing rent and deteriorating infrastructure. In December 2003, the club moved to 240 Elm Street, Suite B9, Davis Square, Somerville, because of renovations to the YWCA building. In 2022, the club moved to its current location, 35 Kingston Street, Unit 1, Boston.

== Activities and tournaments ==
Since 1991, the club has organized over 2600 rated chess tournaments. In 2022, the club hosted 113 tournaments with 491 unique players, including 45 chess experts and 24 chess masters. In 2024, the club hosted 136 tournaments.

One of the club's premier events is the Fall Festival. In 2024, the three-day event had a $4,000 first prize. The club frequently hosts weekly tournaments on Tuesday and Thursday. It also hosts smaller one-day tournaments on the weekends.

In 2024, the Massachusetts Chess Association received a grant from the US Chess Women's Program, which it used to partner with the club to host the Queens Blitz Series. The all-girls Series featured blitz tournaments, simultaneous exhibitions, lectures, and lessons. The Series featured special guests such as GM Nadezhda Kosintseva, WGM Jennifer Yu, WIM Prathiba Y Gounder, and WIM Kateryna Odnorozhenko.

The club hosts the events of the Massachusetts High School Chess League, a chess league open to high schools across Massachusetts.

== Notable players ==
The following is a list of notable players who have participated in events affiliated with the club:

- GM Daniel Naroditsky
- GM Mikhail Tal - Held a simultaneous exhibition at the club in 1988.
- GM Larry Christiansen - Held a simultaneous exhibition at South Station with the club and lectured at the club.
- GM Hans Niemann - Earned his third international master norm at the club.
- GM Jianchao Zhou
- GM Alexander Ivanov
- GM Parimarjan Negi
- GM Fidel Corrales Jimenez
- GM Eugene Perelshteyn
- GM Alder Escobar Forero
- GM Nadezhda Kosintseva - Lectured at the club.
- GM Leonid Kritz - Held a simultaneous exhibition and lectured with the club.
- IM Carissa Yip - 2016–2017 Club Champion
- IM Marc Esserman
- IM Maximillian Lu
- IM Annie Wang
- WGM Jennifer Yu - Held a simultaneous exhibition at the club.
- NM Jessica Hyatt
