= Eric Lawson (chess player) =

Canadian chess player (born 1984)

Personal information
- Born: April 15, 1984 (age 42) Montreal, Quebec, Canada

Chess career
- Country: Canada
- Title: International Master (2004)
- Peak rating: 2393 (July 2006)

Eric Lawson is a Canadian chess player.

== Chess career ==
In 2003, he defeated John K. Shaw and Peter Wells in the Hastings Challengers Tournament.

In 2004, he tied for first place with Pascal Charbonneau in the Canadian Chess Championship, but ultimately lost the tiebreak games and finished as the runner-up.

In August 2006, he defeated Irina Krush after being in a losing position in the Montreal International.
