= Calvin Blocker =

American chess player (born 1955)

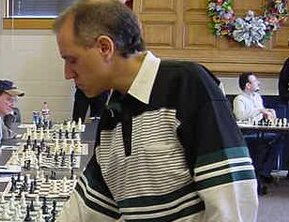
- Calvin Blocker giving a simultaneous exhibition in Akron, Ohio in 2008

Personal information
- Born: June 28, 1955 (age 71) Cleveland, Ohio

Chess career
- Country: United States
- Title: International Master (1982)
- Peak rating: 2435 (January 1979)

Calvin Barry Blocker (born 1955 in Cleveland, Ohio) is an American chess player. He earned his FIDE Master title in 1981 and International Master title in 1982. The winner of a record 15 Ohio championships, Blocker dominated Ohio chess during the 1980s, winning the title every year from 1981 through 1989 except 1983, when he did not participate. He most recently won the championship in 2013. Blocker is also the Ohio state record holder for simultaneous games, having amassed 110 wins and 6 draws in a single exhibition. Well known as a coach, he has taught several high-profile chess players, including Marc Esserman.
