= Jay Bonin =

American chess player (born 1955)

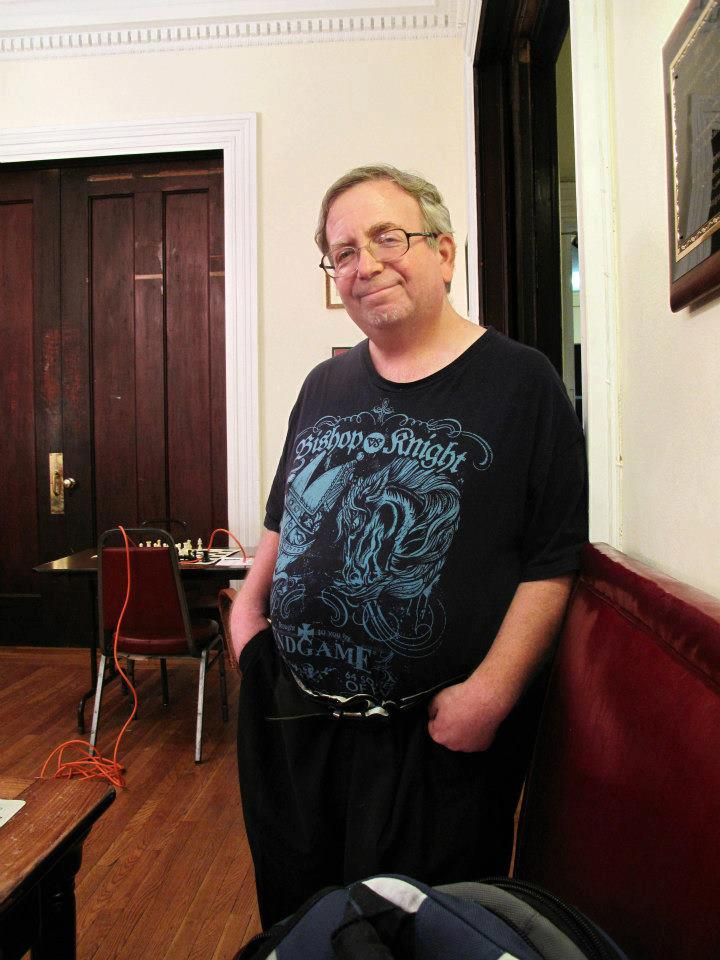
- Bonin in 2011

Personal information
- Born: July 7, 1955 (age 71) Brooklyn, New York

Chess career
- Country: United States
- Title: International Master (1985)
- Peak rating: 2455 (July 1986)

Jay Richard Bonin (born July 7, 1955, in Brooklyn, New York) is an American International Master in chess, chess teacher, author and lecturer. He is known as the "Iron Man of Chess" and is among the most active tournament players in the US, having played over 25,000 tournament games (over 13,000 games since the US Chess Federation started collecting data in 1991 and an estimated 12,000 games for his almost 20 years of tournament play prior).

According to a 2012 article by Dylan McClain in The New York Times, Bonin has "probably has played more tournaments than anyone. The United States Chess Federation lists more than 3,300 tournaments Bonin has competed in since 1991, which is as far back as the computerized records go, though Bonin played just as frequently in the '80s." His peak USCF rating is 2526.

== Chess career; early years ==
Bonin got interested in chess at the age of 14 while attending Andries Hudde Junior High School but did not actively pursue chess until the age of 17 when he watched the televised World Chess Championship match between Bobby Fischer and Boris Spassky in 1972. Bonin got hooked on chess and started frequenting the local chess clubs such as Times Square’s Chess and Checker Club of New York (known as "The Flea House" due to the fact that there was once a Flea Circus upstairs). He also visited The Chess House and played in Washington Square Park. By the end of 1972, Bonin joined the famous Marshall Chess Club in Greenwich Village, having learned about it from an opponent in a high school chess match.

== The 1970s ==
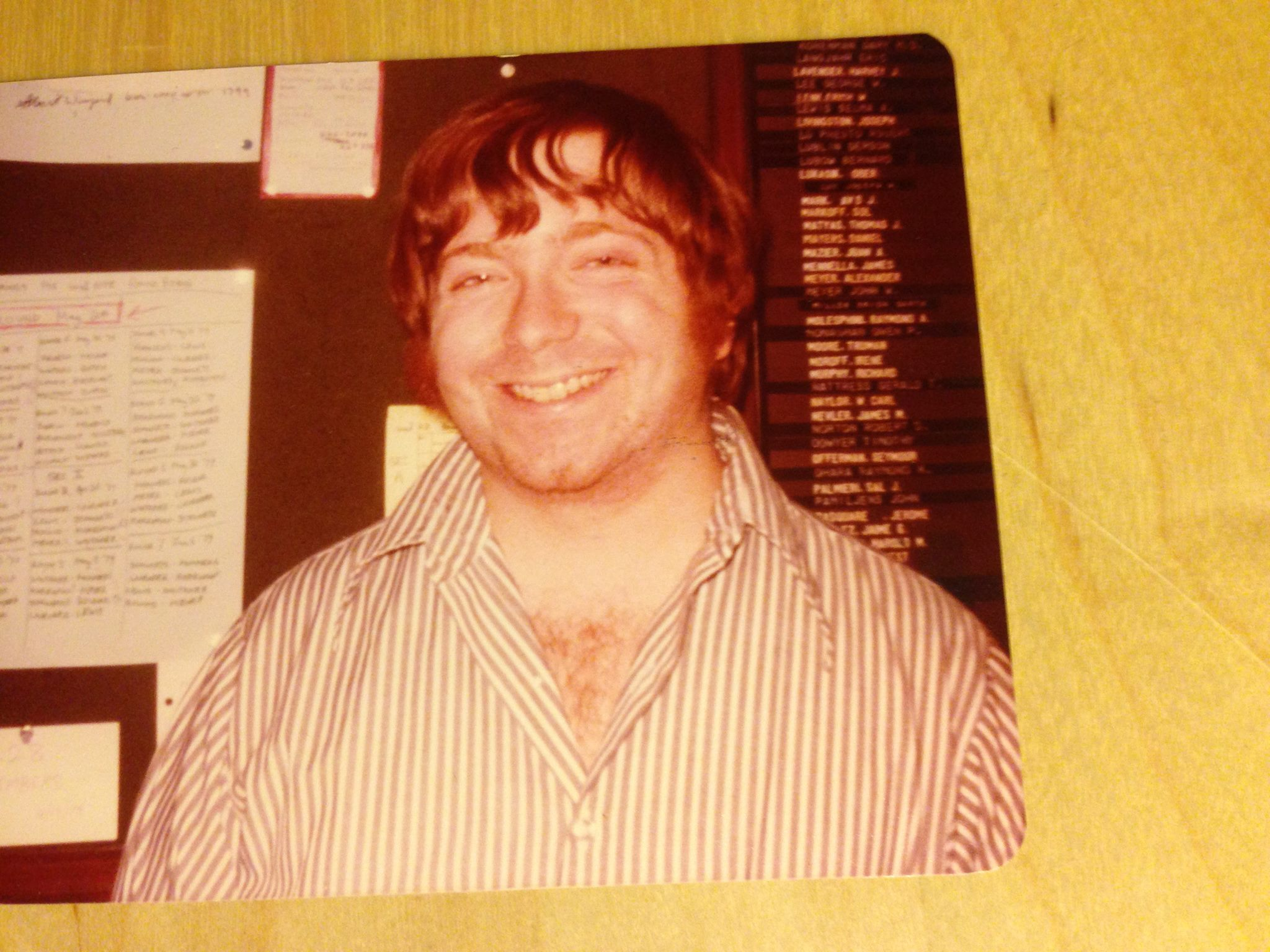
Jay Bonin 1974

Bonin's chess rating steadily improved and in 1977 he achieved the rank of United States Chess Federation National Master. He worked for the Marshall Chess Club as a manager and tournament director from 1977 to 1979. In late 1979 Bonin started teaching chess and began to make a modest living between his tournament prizes and teaching. He supplemented his chess earnings with various odd jobs such as being a messenger and working in a mail room. He would go on to earn the ranks of USCF Senior Master, USCF Life Senior Master, FIDE Master, and FIDE International Master.

== The 1980s ==
On his twenty-seventh birthday in 1982, Bonin collected his first Grandmaster scalp, beating the eight-time U.S. chess champion Sammy Reshevsky at the Continental Chess Association International. He dispatched Reshevsky as black in 43 moves.

Bonin's career in chess really took off in the 1980s. He won the New York State Championship for the first time in 1982. He has won clear first three times (1982, 1997 and 1999) and tied for first in 1993 but tie-breaks gave the title to GM Michael Rohde. Bonin earned the international title of FIDE Master in 1983 and the title of International Master in 1985. Bonin also won the championship of the Marshall Chess Club in 1984, 1987 and 1997. He won the National Congress in 1982. He joined the prestigious Manhattan Chess Club in 1984 and won the club championship three times.

== Chess abroad ==
In 1986, Bonin took a trip to the UK to play in the Lloyds Bank Master Chess Tournament. In 1987 he played in Switzerland and the UK in three tournaments and in 1989 played in the Lloyds Bank tournament once again.

== The 1990s and beyond ==
In 1992, Bonin hit his peak all-time rating of 2526. In October 1995, he was profiled in the New York Times highlighting his active tournament play and the financial struggles of a professional chess master in New York. 1997 was a successful year for Bonin as he won four club championships: Marshall Chess Club, Manhattan Chess Club, Nassau Chess Club and Queens Chess Club. He also achieved something never before done, winning the "Triple Crown" of New York chess events: The New York State Championship, Manhattan Chess Club Championship, and Marshall Chess Club Championship all in the same year, 1997. From 1998 until 2002, he worked at the Manhattan Chess Club as a manager and tournament director.

In 2007, Bonin competed in the US Chess Championship Tournament consisting of thirty six players gathered from the best in the country. In 2005 he competed in the New York Masters events winning three tournaments in a row, defeating Grandmasters Leonid Yudasin, Alexander Stripunsky, Aleksander Wojtkiewicz, and Kamil Miton. In March 2012, Bonin's life as a prolific but struggling chess master was again profiled in The New York Times.

In 2014, Bonin tied for first in the Cleveland Open and in 2015 he took clear first in the same event. In 2014 he tied for 2nd in the New York State Championship. In 2015, Bonin played a blitz match against FM Asa Hoffmann billed as the "Iron Man" vs. the "Gladiator". Iron Man Bonin won 8 - 5. In 2016, a book entitled "Ironman vs. Gladiator: The Ultimate Chess Battle of Legends!" was published about the match. In 2016, Bonin authored a book with Greg Keener entitled "Active Pieces, Practical Advice from America's Most Relentless Tournament Player" with many of his best games (Mongoose Press).

Having competed for parts of five decades, Bonin remains active in tournament play. Bonin remains the most well known active American International Master to have pursued the title of Grandmaster to not have achieved it.

== Style of play ==
Bonin's style of play has evolved over the years. Starting out as a tactician (1.e4 player), he developed into a more positional player, playing mostly 1.d4. He is especially known for his positional maneuvering with knights, known as the "Bonin Knights". He tells his students to control the center, place pieces on optimum squares, to be flexible, and to learn from their losses.
