= Iryna Zenyuk =

Ukrainian-American scientist and chess player (born 1986)

Iryna V. Zenyuk
- Born: 1986 (age 39–40); Ukraine
- Education: New York University
- Known for: Hydrogen technologies
- Scientific career
- Workplaces: University of California, Irvine; Tufts University; Lawrence Berkeley National Laboratory
- Chess career
- Country: United States
- Title: Candidate Master (2006); Woman International Master (2008)
- Peak rating: 2312 (July 2009)

Iryna Zenyuk is a Ukrainian-American scientist working on the development and deployment of renewable hydrogen energy technologies, and an international chess player. She is a professor of Chemical and Biomolecular Engineering at the University of California Irvine (UCI) and the director of the National Fuel Cell Research Center at UCI.

== Education and career ==
Zenyuk was born in Ukraine and emigrated to the US at age 15. She received a B.S in Mechanical Engineering from Polytechnic University (now NYU Tandon School of Engineering) in 2008, graduating summa cum laude. She currently serves on their Alumni Board. She also received a M.S. and a Ph.D. in Mechanical Engineering from Carnegie Mellon University, where she worked on the fundamental understanding meso-scale interfacial transport phenomena and electric double layers in fuel cells. She then became a postdoctoral fellow at Lawrence Berkeley National Laboratory from 2014 to 2015 studying water-management in Polymer Electrolyte Fuel Cell using x-ray at the Advanced Light Source. From 2015 to 2018, she was an assistant professor at Tufts University, before joining University of California, Irvine in 2018 as an assistant professor in Chemical and Biomolecular Engineering Department. She is also the director of the National Fuel Cell Research Center at UCI. She has over 150 peer-reviewed works on electrochemical energy technologies. In addition to this, she has also hosted more than 180 invited presentations on her scientific work.

Zenyuk is an accomplished chess player, reaching a peak FIDE rating of 2312 and peak US Chess Federation rating of 2380 in addition to achieving the Woman International Master title. She also competed in a US - China chess match in August 2013, hosted in Ningbo, China. Zenyuk used to write weekly columns for chess.com from 2009 to 2013, where she would give advice for amateur chess players.

At the start of the Russian invasion of Ukraine in 2022, she organized a fundraising event to help Ukrainian scientists called the UCI's Ukraine Emergency Response Fund, and collected over $200,000.

== Awards and honors ==
- 2021 UCI Beal Applied Innovations Early Career Innovator of the Year honors
- 2021 ECS Energy Technology Division Srinivasan Young Investigator Award
- 2018 Electrochemical Society (ECS) Toyota Young Investigator Award
- 2019 UCI Samueli School of Engineering Early Career Faculty Excellence in Research Award
- 2017 Interpore Society Fraunhofer Award for Young Researchers
- 2017 NSF CAREER Award
