= Robert Gwaze =

Zimbabwean chess player (born 1982)

Personal information
- Born: January 1982 (age 44) Salisbury, Zimbabwe

Chess career
- Country: Zimbabwe
- Title: International Master (2001)
- FIDE rating: 2428 (July 2026)
- Peak rating: 2454 (July 2012)

Robert Gwaze (born 1982) is a Zimbabwean chess player. He is a former student at Prince Edward School, in Harare. At age 15, he was a Zimbabwe National Chess Champion at both junior and senior levels.

== Early years as a chess player ==
Gwaze started playing chess at the age of 9, and, in 1993, he won the Zimbabwean under-12 national chess championships. In 1997, at the age of 15, Gwaze made history by becoming the youngest Zimbabwean national chess champion. Gwaze won the 1998 African Junior Championship in Nairobi, Kenya, which earned him the International Master (IM) title. Probably his greatest success was at the 2002 Chess Olympiad tournament in Bled, Slovenia when he achieved a rare perfect score, winning all nine of his games on first board for Zimbabwe, an achievement that only he and Alexander Alekhine did.

In 2007, Gwaze had an excellent performance against the then Africa's strongest chess players in the 6th African Individual Chess Championship Tournament held in the capital city of Namibia; Windhoek. In a field consisting of the Egyptian GMs Bassem Amin and Ahmed Adly, the then GM-elect Amon Simutowe, the then South African IM Kenny Solomon (who would go on to earn the GM title in the future years), the Tunisian GM Slim Belkhodja, the Angolian IM Pedro Aderito, the Egyptian IMs Essam El-Gindy and Mohamed Ezat and the Egyptian Fide Master (FM) Khaled Abdel Razik, Gwaze had an impressive start - where he won the first five of his games. He then drew the last four of his games, to close the tournament with a result of 7/9, putting him in the clear first position; ahead of IM Pedro Aderito who trailed him by half a point, and others. By the result of the 2007 African Individual Chess Championship, IM Gwaze - along with IM Pedro Aderito, GM Bassem Amin, GM Ahmed Adly and FM Khaled Abdel Razik - qualified for the 2007 Chess World Cup. The 2007 Chess World Cup was also a qualification tournament for the 2010 Chess World Championship. IM Gwaze was eliminated in the first round by fifth-seed Alexei Shirov. In 2010 he came first in the Cuca Trophy international tournament in Luanda, Angola. He took part in the Chess World Cup 2011, but was eliminated in the first round by former FIDE World Champion Ruslan Ponomariov.

== Later years as a chess player ==
From the mid 2010s, IM Gwaze started to play in international tournaments less frequently, leaving Zimbabwe and eventually settling in Namibia. In January 2021, IM Gwaze resurfaced to play a ten blitz chess game match against the Namibian chess prodigy IM Dante Beukes in Windhoek, Namibia. The match was played over the board and also streamed on YouTube. IM Gwaze won the match 10-0. In January 2022, he published his memoir The Life and Games of Robert Gwaze. For tournament play, he resurfaced in 2024 to win the Namibian Open tournament.

== Legacy ==
Speculations within the Zimbabwean and African chess circles still exist on why IM Gwaze failed to attain the third and final GM norm, with him mentioning tournament travelling financing as the biggest obstacle. Also, in the Zimbabwean chess circles, he remains highly regarded and viewed as a pionner and a legend of the games of chess. His 9/9 score at the 2002 Bled Olympiad is still widely discussed within the Zimbabwean, as well as African, chess circles as one of the best and inspirational performances by an African chess player.
