= Arab Chess Championship =

Annual international chess competition

The Arab Chess Championship is an annual international chess competition organized by the Arab Chess Federation, with 18 member countries. Parallel Men's and Women's competitions have been held in various cities since 1983.

== Winners ==
=== Arab Classical Chess Championship ===
Year	City	Winner	Women's winner
1983	Tunis	Saeed Abdul Razak (Iraq)	Maysae Tahtaoui (Syria)
1984	Dubai	Saeed-Ahmed Saeed (United Arab Emirates)	Nadia Mohammad Saleh (United Arab Emirates)
1985	Casablanca	Saeed Abdul Razak (Iraq)	Fermsik Waria Mohammed (Iraq)
1986	Tunis	Slim Bouaziz (Tunisia)	Maysae Tahtaoui (Syria)
1987	Manama	Bassem Afifi (Egypt)	Fermsik Waria Mohammed (Iraq)
1988	Kuwait	Hichem Hamdouchi (Morocco)	Sohir Basta (Egypt)
1991	Dubai	Slim Bouaziz (Tunisia)	Meriem Abbou (Algeria)
1992	Doha	Fouad El Taher (Egypt)	??
1993	Oman	- -	Meriem Abbou (Algeria)
1993	Amman	Hichem Hamdouchi (Morocco)	- -
1994	Jordan	Mohamad Al-Modiahki (Qatar)	Sohir Basta (Egypt)
1995	Beirut	Hichem Hamdouchi (Morocco)	??
1996	Sana'a	Essam Aly Ahmed (Egypt)	??
1997	Iraq	Mohamad Al-Modiahki (Qatar)	??
1998	Agadir	??	Eva Repkova Eid (Lebanon)
1999	Aden	Imad Hakki (Syria)	Knarik Mouradian (Lebanon)
2000	Beirut	Mohamad Al-Modiahki (Qatar)	Eva Repkova Eid (Lebanon)
2001	Tunis	Slim Belkhodja (Tunisia)	Eman Hassane Al Rufei (Iraq)
2002	Casablanca	Mohamad Al-Modiahki (Qatar)	Eman Hassane Al Rufei (Iraq)
2003	Cairo	Essam El Gindy (Egypt)	Knarik Mouradian (Lebanon)
2004	Dubai	Hichem Hamdouchi (Morocco)	Knarik Mouradian (Lebanon)
2005	Dubai	Bassem Amin (Egypt)	Eman Hassane Al Rufei (Iraq)
2006	Dubai	Bassem Amin (Egypt)	Amina Mezioud (Algeria)
2007	Ta'izz	Basheer Al Qudaimi (Yemen)	Knarik Mouradian (Lebanon)
2008	Sharjah	Salem A.R. Saleh (UAE)	Mona Khaled (Egypt)
2009	Tunis	Essam El Gindy (Egypt)	Zhu Chen (Qatar)
2013	Abu Dhabi	Bassem Amin (Egypt)	Zhu Chen (Qatar)
2014	Amman	Salem A.R. Saleh (UAE)	Sabrina Latreche (Algeria), Shahenda Wafa (Egypt)
2015	Agadir	Mohamed Ezat (Egypt)	Mona Khaled (Egypt)
2016	Khartoum	Mahfoud Oussedik (Algeria)	Sabrina Latreche (Algeria)
2017	Sharjah	Mohamed Haddouche (Algeria)	Amina Mezioud (Algeria)
2018	Dubai	Salem A.R. Saleh (UAE)	Shahenda Wafa (Egypt)
2019	Mostaganem	Zaibi Amir (Tunisia)	Amina Mezioud (Algeria)
2021	Dubai	Bilel Bellahcene (Algeria)	Ayah Moaataz (Egypt)
2023	Khartoum	Ahmad Al Khatib (Jordan)	Lina Nassr (Algeria)
2025	Kuwait	Adham Kandil (Egypt)	Boshra Alshaeby (Jordan)

=== Arab Rapid Chess Championship ===
Year	City	Winner	Women's winner
2009	Oman	OMAR AL SIYABI (MAR)	Zhu Chen ( QAT)
2013	Abu Dhabi	Samy Shoker ( EGY)	Mona Khaled ( EGY)
2014	Amman	Nezad Husein Aziz ( QAT)	Zhu Chen ( QAT)
2015	Agadir	Haddouche Mohamed (ALG)	Mona Khaled ( EGY)
2016	Khartoum	Haddouche Mohamed (ALG)	Latreche Sabrina (ALG)
2017	Sharjah	Haddouche Mohamed (ALG)	Alattar Ghayda M (JOR)
2018	Dubai	Hamdouchi Hicham (MAR)	Wafa Shrook ( EGY)
2019	Mostaganem	Haddouche Mohamed (ALG)	Latreche Sabrina (ALG)
2021	Dubai	Bellahcene Bilel (ALG)	Boshra Alshaeby (JOR)

=== Arab Blitz Chess Championship ===
Year	City	Winner	Women's winner
2009	Tunis	Al Sayed Mohamed ( QAT)	Zhu Chen ( QAT)
2013	Abu Dhabi	Bassem Amin ( EGY)	Zhu Chen ( QAT)
2014	Amman	Al-Sayed Mohammed ( QAT)	Wafa Shahenda ( EGY)
2015	Agadir	Haddouche Mohamed (ALG)	Wafa Shrook ( EGY)
2016	Khartoum	Nezad Husein Aziz ( QAT)	Boshra Alshaeby (JOR)
2017	Sharjah	Salem, A.r. Saleh ( UAE)	Boshra Alshaeby ( JOR)
2018	Dubai	Salem, A.r. Saleh ( UAE)	Latreche Sabrina (ALG)
2019	Mostaganem	Issa Rafat ( JOR)	Latreche Sabrina (ALG)
2021	Dubai	Salem A.R. Saleh ( UAE)	Mezioud Amina (ALG)

=== Arab Women's Open Chess Tournament ===
Year	City	Winner
2012	Tunis	Sabrina Latreche (Algeria)

=== Arab Elite Chess Championship ===
Year	City	Winner
2011	Dubai	Salem A R Saleh ( UAE)
2013	Dubai	Al-Modiahki Mohamad ( QAT)
2015	Dubai	Al-Sayed Mohammed ( QAT)

== Related pages ==
- Arab Chess Federation
