= Chess World Cup 2009 =

Chess tournament in Khanty-Mansiysk, Russia

FIDE Chess World Cup 2009
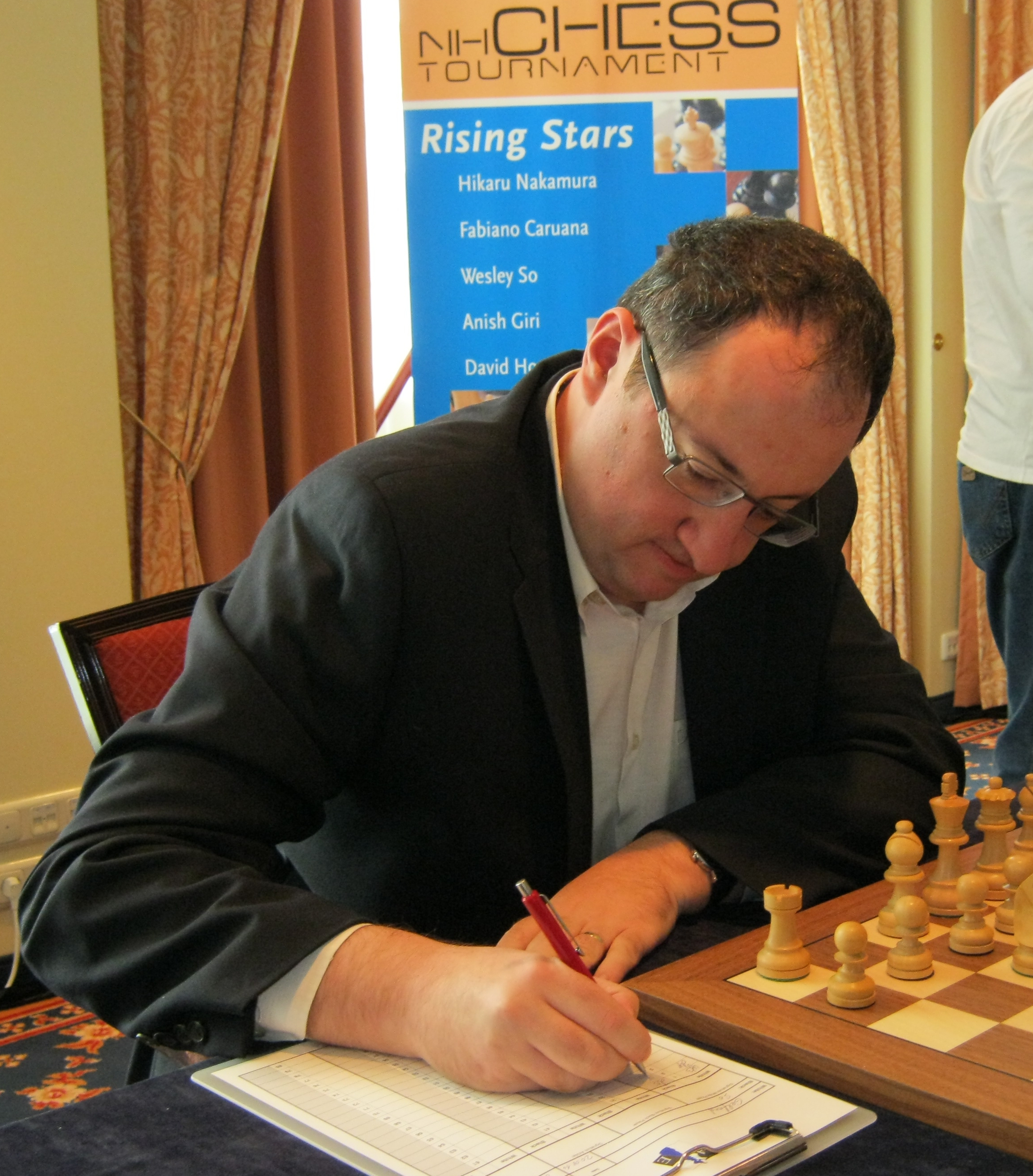
- 2009 FIDE World Cup winner Boris Gelfand

Tournament information
- Sport: Chess
- Location: Khanty-Mansiysk, Russia
- Dates: 20 November 2009–14 December 2009
- Administrator: FIDE
- Tournament format: Single-elimination tournament
- Host: Chess Federation of Russia

Final positions
- Champion: (Israel) Boris Gelfand
- Runner-up: (Ukraine) Ruslan Ponomariov

The Chess World Cup 2009 was a 128-player single-elimination tournament, played between 20 November and 14 December 2009, in Khanty-Mansiysk, Russia. The Cup winner qualified for the Candidates stage of the World Chess Championship 2012. Boris Gelfand defeated Ruslan Ponomariov in the final.

The winner of the Chess World Cup 2007, Gata Kamsky, was defeated by Wesley So in the third round.

== Format ==
Matches consisted of two games (except for the final, which consisted of four). Players had 90 minutes for the first 40 moves followed by 30 minutes for the rest of the game with an addition of 30 seconds per move from move one. If the match was tied after the regular games, tie breaks were played on the next day. The format for the tie breaks was as follows:

- Four rapid games (25 minutes plus 10 second increment) were played. According to chess journalist Mig Greengard, a "high FIDE official" admitted off the record that this unusual decision of playing four games instead of two was actually a mistake that was spotted too late to correct it.
- If the score was still tied, up to five pairs of blitz games (5 minutes plus 3 second increment) were played. If one player led after a pair of blitz games, that player was declared the winner. This was a change from previous events, for instance at the Chess World Cup 2007 the match went to an armageddon game after a single pair of blitz games.
- If the score was still tied after five pairs of blitz games, a single armageddon game (white must win, black only needs to draw) would be played. White had 5 minutes, black had 4 minutes, and both players had three-second increments beginning with move 61. Ultimately, no Armageddon games were played, as all matches were decided before that stage.

== Participants ==
The players qualified for the event were:

1. Boris Gelfand (ISR), 2758 (R)
2. Vugar Gashimov (AZE), 2758 (R)
3. Peter Svidler (RUS), 2754 (R)
4. Alexander Morozevich (RUS), 2750 (R)
5. Teimour Radjabov (AZE), 2748 (R)
6. Vassily Ivanchuk (UKR), 2739 (R)
7. Ruslan Ponomariov (UKR), 2739 (R)
8. Alexander Grischuk (RUS), 2736 (R)
9. Dmitry Jakovenko (RUS), 2736 (R)
10. Wang Yue (CHN), 2734 (R)
11. Pavel Eljanov (UKR), 2729 (E09)
12. Sergey Karjakin (UKR), 2723 (SF)
13. Shakhriyar Mamedyarov (AZE), 2719 (R)
14. Alexei Shirov (ESP), 2719 (SF)
15. Leinier Domínguez (CUB), 2719 (R)
16. Sergei Movsesian (SVK), 2718 (E08)
17. Maxime Vachier-Lagrave (FRA), 2718 (E08)
18. Evgeny Alekseev (RUS), 2715 (R)
19. Evgeny Tomashevsky (RUS), 2708 (E09)
20. Wang Hao (CHN), 2708 (R)
21. David Navara (CZE), 2707 (E09)
22. Vladimir Malakhov (RUS), 2706 (R)
23. Étienne Bacrot (FRA), 2700 (R)
24. Sergei Rublevsky (RUS), 2697 (R)
25. Baadur Jobava (GEO), 2696 (E09)
26. Alexander Motylev (RUS), 2695 (E09)
27. Gata Kamsky (USA), 2695 (SF)
28. Nikita Vitiugov (RUS), 2694 (E09)
29. Viktor Bologan (MDA), 2692 (E08)
30. Arkadij Naiditsch (GER), 2689 (E09)
31. Bu Xiangzhi (CHN), 2682 (R)
32. Judit Polgár (HUN), 2680 (R)
33. Liviu-Dieter Nisipeanu (ROU), 2677 (E09)
34. Gabriel Sargissian (ARM), 2676 (E08)
35. Alexander Onischuk (USA), 2672 (Z2.1)
36. Ivan Cheparinov (BUL), 2671 (PN)
37. Zahar Efimenko (UKR), 2668 (E08)
38. Emil Sutovsky (ISR), 2666 (E08)
39. Evgeniy Najer (RUS), 2666 (E08)
40. Sergei Tiviakov (NED), 2664 (E08)
41. Alexander Areshchenko (UKR), 2664 (E09)
42. Krishnan Sasikiran (IND), 2664 (R)
43. Ilya Smirin (ISR), 2662 (E08)
44. Vladimir Baklan (UKR), 2655 (E08)
45. Surya Shekhar Ganguly (IND), 2654 (AS)
46. Alexandr Fier (BRA), 2653 (Z2.4)
47. Laurent Fressinet (FRA), 2653 (E08)
48. Georg Meier (GER), 2653 (E09)
49. Boris Grachev (RUS), 2652 (E08)
50. Fabiano Caruana (ITA), 2652 (PN)
51. Ivan Sokolov (BIH), 2652 (E09)
52. Vadim Milov (SUI), 2652 (R)
53. Artyom Timofeev (RUS), 2651 (E09)
54. Ernesto Inarkiev (RUS), 2645 (E09)
55. Boris Savchenko (RUS), 2644 (E09)
56. Mikhail Kobalia (RUS), 2643 (E09)
57. Vladislav Tkachiev (FRA), 2642 (PN)
58. Pavel Tregubov (RUS), 2642 (E08)
59. Wesley So (PHI), 2640 (Z3.3)
60. Julio Granda (PER), 2640 (AM09)
61. Viktor Láznička (CZE), 2637 (E08)
62. Dmitry Andreikin (RUS), 2636 (E08)
63. Rauf Mamedov (AZE), 2634 (E09)
64. Farrukh Amonatov (TJK), 2631 (Z3.4)
65. Sergey Volkov (RUS), 2629 (E08)
66. Zhou Jianchao (CHN), 2629 (Z3.5)
67. Tomi Nybäck (FIN), 2628 (E08)
68. Ioánnis Papaïoánnou (GRE), 2628 (E08)
69. Konstantin Sakaev (RUS), 2626 (E09)
70. Gadir Guseinov (AZE), 2625 (E09)
71. Varuzhan Akobian (USA), 2624 (Z2.1)
72. Lê Quang Liêm (VIE), 2624 (AS)
73. Chanda Sandipan (IND), 2623 (AS)
74. Yury Shulman (USA), 2623 (Z2.1)
75. Jan Gustafsson (GER), 2622 (E08)
76. Rafael Leitão (BRA), 2621 (Z2.4)
77. Parimarjan Negi (IND), 2620 (AS)
78. Sergey Fedorchuk (UKR), 2619 (E09)
79. Lázaro Bruzón (CUB), 2619 (Z2.3)
80. Mateusz Bartel (POL), 2618 (E09)
81. Tigran L. Petrosian (ARM), 2615 (E09)
82. Sanan Sjugirov (RUS), 2612 (E09)
83. Alexander Khalifman (RUS), 2612 (E08)
84. Anton Filippov (UZB), 2607 (Z3.4)
85. Alexander Shabalov (USA), 2606 (AM09)
86. Jaan Ehlvest (USA), 2606 (AM08)
87. Erwin l'Ami (NED), 2606 (E08)
88. Fidel Corrales Jimenez (CUB), 2605 (AM09)
89. Eduardo Iturrizaga (VEN), 2605 (Z2.3)
90. Ehsan Ghaem Maghami (IRI), 2603 (PN)
91. Zhou Weiqi (CHN), 2603 (AS)
92. Gilberto Milos (BRA), 2603 (AM09)
93. Yuriy Kryvoruchko (UKR), 2602 (E08)
94. Diego Flores (ARG), 2602 (AM09)
95. Li Chao (CHN), 2596 (Z3.5)
96. Constantin Lupulescu (ROU), 2591 (E09)
97. Duško Pavasovič (SLO), 2590 (E08)
98. Yannick Pelletier (SUI), 2589 (PN)
99. Hou Yifan (CHN), 2588 (AS)
100. Ahmed Adly (EGY), 2583 (J07)
101. Abhijeet Gupta (IND), 2578 (J08)
102. Rogelio Antonio Jr. (PHI), 2574 (AS)
103. Robert Hess (USA), 2572 (Z2.1)
104. Ray Robson (USA), 2567, IM (PN)
105. Iván Morovic (CHI), 2562 (Z2.5)
106. Friso Nijboer (NED), 2561 (E09)
107. Bassem Amin (EGY), 2553 (AF)
108. Darwin Laylo (PHI), 2552 (Z3.3)
109. Joshua Friedel (USA), 2551 (Z2.1)
110. Alexander Ivanov (USA), 2539 (AM09)
111. Aleksei Pridorozhni (RUS), 2533, IM (ON)
112. Yu Shaoteng (CHN), 2529 (AS)
113. Yu Yangyi (CHN), 2527 (AS)
114. David Smerdon (AUS), 2525 (Z3.6)
115. Abhijit Kunte (IND), 2522 (AS)
116. Alexandra Kosteniuk (RUS), 2516 (WWC)
117. Andrés Rodríguez (URU), 2508 (Z2.5)
118. Mohamad Al Sayed (QAT), 2504 (Z3.1)
119. Nikolai Kabanov (RUS), 2501 (ON)
120. Aimen Rizouk (ALG), 2500 (AF)
121. Sriram Jha (IND), 2497, IM (Z3.2)
122. Essam El-Gindy (EGY), 2493 (AF)
123. Alexei Bezgodov (RUS), 2484 (ON)
124. Mohamed Ezat (EGY), 2472, IM (AF)
125. Khaled Abdel Razik (EGY), 2469, IM (AF)
126. Jean Hébert (CAN), 2420, IM (Z2.2)
127. Walaa Sarwat (EGY), 2405, IM (AF)
128. Andrei Obodchuk (RUS), 2404, IM (ON)

All players are grandmasters unless indicated otherwise. The pairings of the 1st round (players were seeded according to their ratings) were announced on 2 November 2009, immediately after the publishing of the November rating list. The list of players who declined participation: Anand, Carlsen, Topalov, Aronian, Kramnik, Leko, Adams, Nakamura, and Ni Hua. Among them, Anand, Topalov and Aronian had already qualified for the Candidates or the Championship match; Carlsen, Kramnik, Nakamura, Adams and Ni had committed to play in the London Chess Classic on 7–15 December 2009.

Qualification paths:

- SF: Semi-finalist of Chess World Cup 2007
- WWC: Women's World Champion
- J07 and J08: World Junior Champions 2007 and 2008
- R: Rating (average of July 2008 and January 2009 ratings is used)
- E08 and E09: European Individual Championships 2008 and 2009
- AM08: Pan American Chess Championship 2008
- AM09: Continental Absolute Chess Championship Americas 2009
- AS: Asian Chess Championship 2009
- AF: African Chess Championship 2009
- Z2.1, Z2.2, Z2.3, Z2.4, Z2.5, Z3.1, Z3.2, Z3.3, Z3.4, Z3.5, Z3.6: Zonal tournaments
- PN: FIDE president nominee
- ON: Organizer nominee

== Calendar ==
Round	Regular games	Tiebreaks
Round 1	21–22 November	23 November
Round 2	24–25 November	26 November
Round 3	27–28 November	29 November
Round 4	30 November, 1 December	2 December
Quarterfinals	3–4 December	5 December
Semifinals	6–7 December	8 December
Final	10–13 December	14 December

== Summary of results ==
=== Round one ===
In the first round of the tournament all of the top 30 seeded players progressed, with the sole exception of Slovak Sergei Movsesian (16), who was eliminated by the Chinese 113th seed Yu Yangyi. Judit Polgár achieved a walkover, due to her opponent Duško Pavasovič withdrawing from the competition due to injury. The round was notable for the 16-game match between Pavel Tregubov and Varuzhan Akobian: after each winning with white over the first two days, their tiebreak held a marathon of four rapid games followed by ten blitz games. The two players fought until near 1 a.m. local time for the right to face Ruslan Ponomariov in the second round (which would start the next morning), Akobian finally achieving the decisive two-point advantage in the final bout before an Armageddon game would have been required.

=== Round two ===
The first day of Round Two included a number of upsets. The highest seed to have won their match was Alexander Grischuk (8), as Peter Svidler (3), Alexander Morozevich (4), Teimour Radjabov (5) and Vassily Ivanchuk (6) all lost and the remaining highest seeds (Gelfand, Gashimov and Ponomariov) drew. On the next day of matches, Morozevich, Radjabov and Ivanchuk were all eliminated, and exactly half of the matches went to tie-breaks. Of the 32 players to reach Round Three, all but seven players had been originally seeded in the top 32.

=== Round three ===
Sixteen-year-old Wesley So, who had upset Ivanchuk in Round Two, achieved another major upset, defeating Gata Kamsky, the 2007 winner, 1½-½. In the second rapid tiebreak, Chinese players Wang Yue and Li Chao were not at their seats for the start of the round, and lost the game, and their matches against Bacrot and Gashimov.

=== Round four ===
This round marked the departure of most of the youthful players from the World Cup. Wesley So (16), Fabiano Caruana (17) and Maxime Vachier-Lagrave (19) were eliminated by the more experienced Malakhov, Gashimov and Gelfand respectively, leaving Sergey Karjakin the only under-20 player left in contention.

== Results, rounds 1–4 ==
=== Section 1 ===
First round
1	Boris Gelfand (ISR)	1½
128	Andrei Obodchuk (RUS)	½
64	Farrukh Amonatov (TJK)	1½
65	Sergey Volkov (RUS)	½
32	Judit Polgár (HUN)	w/o
97	Duško Pavasovič (SLO)
33	Liviu-Dieter Nisipeanu (ROU)	1½
96	Constantin Lupulescu (ROU)	½
16	Sergei Movsesian (SVK)	½
113	Yu Yangyi (CHN)	1½
49	Boris Grachev (RUS)	3
80	Mateusz Bartel (POL)	5
17	Maxime Vachier-Lagrave (FRA)	1½
112	Yu Shaoteng (CHN)	½
48	Georg Meier (GER)	1½
81	Tigran L. Petrosian (ARM)	½

Second round
1	Boris Gelfand (ISR)	1½
64	Farrukh Amonatov (TJK)	½
32	Judit Polgár (HUN)	4½
33	Liviu-Dieter Nisipeanu (ROU)	3½
113	Yu Yangyi (CHN)	1½
80	Mateusz Bartel (POL)	½
17	Maxime Vachier-Lagrave (FRA)	3½
48	Georg Meier (GER)	2½

Third round
1	Boris Gelfand (ISR)	3½
32	Judit Polgár (HUN)	2½
113	Yu Yangyi (CHN)	½
17	Maxime Vachier-Lagrave (FRA)	1½

Fourth round
1	Boris Gelfand (ISR)	4½
17	Maxime Vachier-Lagrave (FRA)	3½

=== Section 2 ===
First round
8	Alexander Grischuk (RUS)	1½
121	Sriram Jha (IND)	½
57	Vladislav Tkachiev (FRA)	3½
72	Lê Quang Liêm (VIE)	1½
25	Baadur Jobava (GEO)	1½
104	Ray Robson (USA)	½
40	Sergei Tiviakov (NED)	2½
89	Eduardo Iturrizaga (VEN)	3½
9	Dmitry Jakovenko (RUS)	1½
120	Aimen Rizouk (ALG)	½
56	Mikhail Kobalia (RUS)	½
73	Chanda Sandipan (IND)	1½
24	Sergei Rublevsky (RUS)	1½
105	Iván Morovic (CHI)	½
41	Alexander Areshchenko (UKR)	1½
88	Fidel Corrales Jimenez (CUB)	½

Second round
8	Alexander Grischuk (RUS)	1½
57	Vladislav Tkachiev (FRA)	½
25	Baadur Jobava (GEO)	1½
89	Eduardo Iturrizaga (VEN)	½
9	Dmitry Jakovenko (RUS)	2
73	Chanda Sandipan (IND)	0
24	Sergei Rublevsky (RUS)	2½
41	Alexander Areshchenko (UKR)	3½

Third round
8	Alexander Grischuk (RUS)	5
25	Baadur Jobava (GEO)	3
9	Dmitry Jakovenko (RUS)	4
41	Alexander Areshchenko (UKR)	2

Fourth round
8	Alexander Grischuk (RUS)	3
9	Dmitry Jakovenko (RUS)	5

=== Section 3 ===
First round
4	Alexander Morozevich (RUS)	2
125	Khaled Abdel Razik (EGY)	0
61	Viktor Láznička (CZE)	1½
68	Ioánnis Papaïoánnou (GRE)	½
29	Viktor Bologan (MDA)	1½
100	Ahmed Adly (EGY)	½
36	Ivan Cheparinov (BUL)	3½
93	Yuriy Kryvoruchko (UKR)	2½
13	Shakhriyar Mamedyarov (AZE)	2
116	Alexandra Kosteniuk (RUS)	0
52	Vadim Milov (SUI)	3½
77	Parimarjan Negi (IND)	1½
20	Wang Hao (CHN)	2
109	Joshua Friedel (USA)	0
45	Surya Shekhar Ganguly (IND)	2
84	Anton Filippov (UZB)	0

Second round
4	Alexander Morozevich (RUS)	0
61	Viktor Láznička (CZE)	2
29	Viktor Bologan (MDA)	4
36	Ivan Cheparinov (BUL)	2
13	Shakhriyar Mamedyarov (AZE)	2
52	Vadim Milov (SUI)	0
20	Wang Hao (CHN)	2
45	Surya Shekhar Ganguly (IND)	0

Third round
61	Viktor Láznička (CZE)	3½
29	Viktor Bologan (MDA)	1½
13	Shakhriyar Mamedyarov (AZE)	1½
20	Wang Hao (CHN)	½

Fourth round
61	Viktor Láznička (CZE)	½
13	Shakhriyar Mamedyarov (AZE)	1½

=== Section 4 ===
First round
5	Teimour Radjabov (AZE)	2
124	Mohamed Ezat (EGY)	0
60	Julio Granda (PER)	½
69	Konstantin Sakaev (RUS)	1½
28	Nikita Vitiugov (RUS)	1½
101	Abhijeet Gupta (IND)	½
37	Zahar Efimenko (UKR)	½
92	Gilberto Milos (BRA)	1½
12	Sergey Karjakin (UKR)	1½
117	Andrés Rodríguez (URU)	½
53	Artyom Timofeev (RUS)	3½
76	Rafael Leitão (BRA)	2½
21	David Navara (CZE)	4
108	Darwin Laylo (PHI)	2
44	Vladimir Baklan (UKR)	3½
85	Alexander Shabalov (USA)	4½

Second round
5	Teimour Radjabov (AZE)	½
69	Konstantin Sakaev (RUS)	1½
28	Nikita Vitiugov (RUS)	4½
92	Gilberto Milos (BRA)	3½
12	Sergey Karjakin (UKR)	3½
53	Artyom Timofeev (RUS)	2½
21	David Navara (CZE)	3½
85	Alexander Shabalov (USA)	2½

Third round
69	Konstantin Sakaev (RUS)	½
28	Nikita Vitiugov (RUS)	1½
12	Sergey Karjakin (UKR)	4
21	David Navara (CZE)	1

Fourth round
28	Nikita Vitiugov (RUS)	½
12	Sergey Karjakin (UKR)	1½

=== Section 5 ===
First round
2	Vugar Gashimov (AZE)	2
127	Walaa Sarwat (EGY)	0
63	Rauf Mamedov (AZE)	½
66	Zhou Jianchao (CHN)	1½
31	Bu Xiangzhi (CHN)	½
98	Yannick Pelletier (SUI)	1½
34	Gabriel Sargissian (ARM)	3
95	Li Chao (CHN)	5
15	Leinier Domínguez (CUB)	3½
114	David Smerdon (AUS)	2½
50	Fabiano Caruana (ITA)	1½
79	Lázaro Bruzón (CUB)	½
18	Evgeny Alekseev (RUS)	1½
111	Aleksei Pridorozhni (RUS)	½
47	Laurent Fressinet (FRA)	2
82	Sanan Sjugirov (RUS)	0

Second round
2	Vugar Gashimov (AZE)	1½
66	Zhou Jianchao (CHN)	½
98	Yannick Pelletier (SUI)	3½
95	Li Chao (CHN)	4½
15	Leinier Domínguez (CUB)	2
50	Fabiano Caruana (ITA)	4
18	Evgeny Alekseev (RUS)	3½
47	Laurent Fressinet (FRA)	1½

Third round
2	Vugar Gashimov (AZE)	3½
95	Li Chao (CHN)	1½
50	Fabiano Caruana (ITA)	3½
18	Evgeny Alekseev (RUS)	2½

Fourth round
2	Vugar Gashimov (AZE)	3½
50	Fabiano Caruana (ITA)	1½

=== Section 6 ===
First round
7	Ruslan Ponomariov (UKR)	1½
122	Essam El-Gindy (EGY)	½
58	Pavel Tregubov (RUS)	7
71	Varuzhan Akobian (USA)	9
26	Alexander Motylev (RUS)	1½
103	Robert Hess (USA)	½
39	Evgeniy Najer (RUS)	1½
90	Ehsan Ghaem Maghami (IRI)	½
10	Wang Yue (CHN)	2
119	Nikolai Kabanov (RUS)	0
55	Boris Savchenko (RUS)	4½
74	Yury Shulman (USA)	3½
23	Étienne Bacrot (FRA)	3½
106	Friso Nijboer (NED)	1½
42	Krishnan Sasikiran (IND)	3½
87	Erwin l'Ami (NED)	1½

Second round
7	Ruslan Ponomariov (UKR)	4
71	Varuzhan Akobian (USA)	2
26	Alexander Motylev (RUS)	1½
39	Evgeniy Najer (RUS)	½
10	Wang Yue (CHN)	2
55	Boris Savchenko (RUS)	0
23	Étienne Bacrot (FRA)	2
42	Krishnan Sasikiran (IND)	0

Third round
7	Ruslan Ponomariov (UKR)	1½
26	Alexander Motylev (RUS)	½
10	Wang Yue (CHN)	1½
23	Étienne Bacrot (FRA)	3½

Fourth round
7	Ruslan Ponomariov (UKR)	3½
23	Étienne Bacrot (FRA)	2½

=== Section 7 ===
First round
3	Peter Svidler (RUS)	2
126	Jean Hébert (CAN)	0
62	Dmitry Andreikin (RUS)	3½
67	Tomi Nybäck (FIN)	4½
30	Arkadij Naiditsch (GER)	3½
99	Hou Yifan (CHN)	2½
35	Alexander Onischuk (USA)	1½
94	Diego Flores (ARG)	½
14	Alexei Shirov (ESP)	1½
115	Abhijit Kunte (IND)	½
51	Ivan Sokolov (BIH)	0
78	Sergey Fedorchuk (UKR)	2
19	Evgeny Tomashevsky (RUS)	1½
110	Alexander Ivanov (USA)	½
46	Alexandr Fier (BRA)	2½
83	Alexander Khalifman (RUS)	3½

Second round
3	Peter Svidler (RUS)	3½
67	Tomi Nybäck (FIN)	1½
30	Arkadij Naiditsch (GER)	1½
35	Alexander Onischuk (USA)	½
14	Alexei Shirov (ESP)	4
78	Sergey Fedorchuk (UKR)	1
19	Evgeny Tomashevsky (RUS)	3½
83	Alexander Khalifman (RUS)	2½

Third round
3	Peter Svidler (RUS)	5
30	Arkadij Naiditsch (GER)	3
14	Alexei Shirov (ESP)	1½
19	Evgeny Tomashevsky (RUS)	½

Fourth round
3	Peter Svidler (RUS)	1½
14	Alexei Shirov (ESP)	½

=== Section 8 ===
First round
6	Vassily Ivanchuk (UKR)	2
123	Alexei Bezgodov (RUS)	0
59	Wesley So (PHI)	4
70	Gadir Guseinov (AZE)	1
27	Gata Kamsky (USA)	1½
102	Rogelio Antonio Jr. (PHI)	½
38	Emil Sutovsky (ISR)	1½
91	Zhou Weiqi (CHN)	3½
11	Pavel Eljanov (UKR)	1½
118	Mohamad Al Sayed (QAT)	½
54	Ernesto Inarkiev (RUS)	3½
75	Jan Gustafsson (GER)	1½
22	Vladimir Malakhov (RUS)	2
107	Bassem Amin (EGY)	0
43	Ilya Smirin (ISR)	1½
86	Jaan Ehlvest (USA)	½

Second round
6	Vassily Ivanchuk (UKR)	½
59	Wesley So (PHI)	1½
27	Gata Kamsky (USA)	1½
91	Zhou Weiqi (CHN)	½
11	Pavel Eljanov (UKR)	3½
54	Ernesto Inarkiev (RUS)	2½
22	Vladimir Malakhov (RUS)	3½
43	Ilya Smirin (ISR)	1½

Third round
59	Wesley So (PHI)	1½
27	Gata Kamsky (USA)	½
11	Pavel Eljanov (UKR)	1
22	Vladimir Malakhov (RUS)	4

Fourth round
59	Wesley So (PHI)	1
22	Vladimir Malakhov (RUS)	4

== Results, rounds 5–7 ==
Quarterfinals
1	(Israel) Boris Gelfand	3½
9	(Russia) Dmitry Jakovenko	1½
13	(Azerbaijan) Shakhriyar Mamedyarov	½
12	(Ukraine) Sergey Karjakin	1½
2	(Azerbaijan) Vugar Gashimov	1½
7	(Ukraine) Ruslan Ponomariov	3½
3	(Russia) Peter Svidler	½
22	(Russia) Vladimir Malakhov	1½

Semifinals
1	(Israel) Boris Gelfand	2
12	(Ukraine) Sergey Karjakin	0
7	(Ukraine) Ruslan Ponomariov	4
22	(Russia) Vladimir Malakhov	2

Final (best of 4)
1	(Israel) Boris Gelfand	7
7	(Ukraine) Ruslan Ponomariov	5

=== Final, 10–14 December ===
Seed	Name	Rating	1	2	3	4	R1	R2	R3	R4	TB1	TB2	TB3	TB4	Total
1	Boris Gelfand (ISR)	2758	½	½	½	½	½	1	½	0	1	0	1	1	7
7	Ruslan Ponomariov (UKR)	2739	½	½	½	½	½	0	½	1	0	1	0	0	5
