= African Chess Championship =

International chess competition

The first African Chess Championship was played in 1998. Ibrahim Hasan Labib and Mohamed Tissir both shared first place with 7/10, but the former took the title.

The 2007 championship was the FIDE Zone 4 qualifier for the Chess World Cup 2007, the next stage in the 2010 World Championship. Six players qualified for the 2007 World Cup: IM Robert Gwaze (Zimbabwe), IM Pedro Aderito (Angola), IM Essam El Gindy (Egypt), GM Bassem Amin (Egypt), GM Ahmed Adly (Egypt), and FM Khaled Abdel Razik (Egypt).

== Winners ==
Year	City	Winner	Women's winner
1998	Cairo	Ibrahim Hasan Labib (Egypt)	
1999	Agadir	Mohamed Tissir (Morocco)	
2001	Cairo	Hichem Hamdouchi (Morocco)	Asma Houli (Algeria)
2003	Abuja	Essam El-Gindy (Egypt)	Farida Arouche (Algeria)
2005	Lusaka	Ahmed Adly (Egypt)	Tuduetso Sabure (Botswana)
2007	Windhoek	Robert Gwaze (Zimbabwe)	Mona Khaled (Egypt)
2009	Tripoli	Bassem Amin (Egypt)	Melissa Greeff (South Africa)
2011	Maputo	Ahmed Adly (Egypt)	Mona Khaled (Egypt)
2013	Tunis	Bassem Amin (Egypt)	Shrook Wafa (Egypt)
2014	Windhoek	Kenny Solomon (South Africa)	Shrook Wafa (Egypt)
2015	Cairo	Bassem Amin (Egypt)	Mona Khaled (Egypt)
2016	Kampala	Abdelrahman Hesham (Egypt)	Shrook Wafa (Egypt)
2017	Oran	Bassem Amin (Egypt)	Shahenda Wafa (Egypt)
2018	Livingstone	Bassem Amin (Egypt)	Shahenda Wafa (Egypt)
2019	Hammamet	Ahmed Adly (Egypt)	Shrook Wafa (Egypt)
2020	Not held due to the COVID-19 pandemic in Africa		
2021	Lilongwe	Ahmed Adly (Egypt)	Jesse February (South Africa)
2022	Lagos	Bassem Amin (Egypt)	Shahenda Wafa (Egypt)
2023	Cairo	Adham Fawzy (Egypt)	Lina Nassr (Algeria)
2024	Accra	Bassem Amin (Egypt)	Jesse February (South Africa)
2025	Cairo	Bilel Bellahcene (Algeria)	Shrook Wafa (Egypt)
2026	Jwaneng	Bilel Bellahcene (Algeria)	Shahenda Wafa (Egypt)

=== Multiple winners – Open ===
Wins	Player	Winning years
7	Bassem Amin (Egypt)	2009, 2013, 2015, 2017, 2018, 2022, 2024
4	Ahmed Adly (Egypt)	2005, 2011, 2019, 2021
2	Bilel Bellahcene (Algeria)	2025, 2026

=== Multiple winners – Women ===
Wins	Player	Winning years
5	Shrook Wafa (Egypt)	2013, 2014, 2016, 2019, 2025
4	Shahenda Wafa (Egypt)	2017, 2018, 2022, 2026
3	Mona Khaled (Egypt)	2007, 2011, 2015
2	Jesse February (South Africa)	2021, 2024

=== Wins by country – Open ===
Wins	Country	Winning years
15	Egypt	1998, 2003, 2005 , 2009, 2011, 2013, 2015, 2016, 2017, 2018, 2019, 2021, 2022, 2023, 2024
2	Algeria	2025, 2026
2	Morocco	1999, 2001
1	South Africa	2014
1	Zimbabwe	2007

=== Wins by country – Women ===
Wins	Country	Winning years
12	Egypt	2011, 2013, 2014, 2015, 2016, 2017, 2018, 2019, 2021, 2022, 2025, 2026
3	Algeria	2001, 2003, 2023
3	South Africa	2009, 2021, 2024
1	Botswana	2005

== Notes ==
GM Ahmed Adly is the 2021 African Individual Chess Champion. WIM Jesse February is crowned 2021 African Individual Chess Champion.
