= Mustafa Ahmed Bakali =

Moroccan chess player (1924–2005)

Personal information
- Born: 1924
- Died: 13 July 2005 Tétouan

Chess career
- Country: Morocco

Mustafa Ahmed Bakali (also Mustapha Bakkali; Arabic: مصطفى أحمد بقالي; 1924 – 13 July 2005) was a Moroccan chess player and organizer. He won the first official Moroccan Chess Championship in 1965, and was president of the Royal Moroccan Chess Federation (FRME) from 1975 to 1986.

== Biography ==
Mustafa Bakali was a native of Tétouan. He won the first official Moroccan Chess Championship held from 24 July to 1 August 1965 at the Union Club in his home city, scoring 6/7 in an eight-player round robin. He defended his title successfully in 1966, and won the title a third time in 1973 by defeating Ahmed Bennis in a match held in Rabat.

Bakali played for Morocco in four Chess Olympiads:

- In 1966, at first board in the 17th Chess Olympiad in Havana (+5, =1, -10),
- In 1968, at first board in the 18th Chess Olympiad in Lugano (+3, =5, -9),
- In 1974, at first board in the 21st Chess Olympiad in Nice (+3, =0, -14),
- In 1978, at second reserve board in the 23rd Chess Olympiad in Buenos Aires (+1, =0, -1).

Bakali was a founding member of the Royal Moroccan Chess Federation in 1963, and managed the federation in an unofficial capacity from 1965 to 1969. He served as president of the federation from 1975 to 1986. He was also a founding member of the Arab Chess Federation.

Bakali died in Tétouan on 13 July 2005 at the age of 81, after a long illness.
