= Koen Leenhouts =

Dutch chess grandmaster (born 1984)

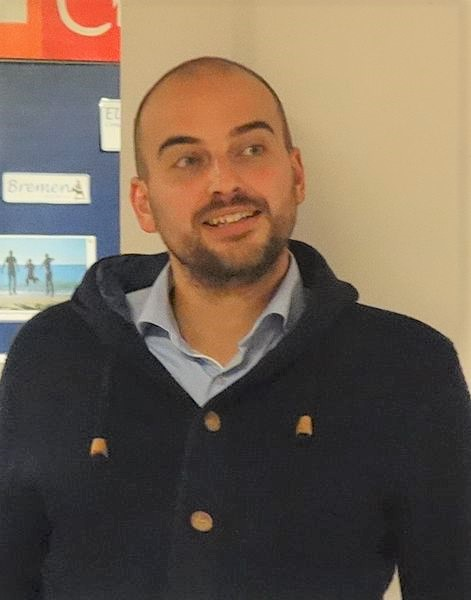
- Leenhouts in 2017

Personal information
- Born: January 10, 1984 (age 42) Oostburg, Netherlands

Chess career
- Country: Netherlands
- Title: Grandmaster (2023)
- FIDE rating: 2459 (July 2026)
- Peak rating: 2513 (November 2016)

Koen Leenhouts is a Dutch chess grandmaster.

== Chess career ==
In April 2012, he won the Zeeland Rapid Open tournament, finishing with a score of 3 points over second place.

In August 2017, he tied for first place with Sandipan Chanda at the Netherlands Open, but was ranked in second place due to tiebreaks. This secured him his first GM norm.

In April 2023, he achieved his final GM norm at the Belgian Interclubs; the same tournament in which he achieved his second GM norm.
