= Aleksandar Čoloviḱ =

Macedonian chess grandmaster (born 1976)

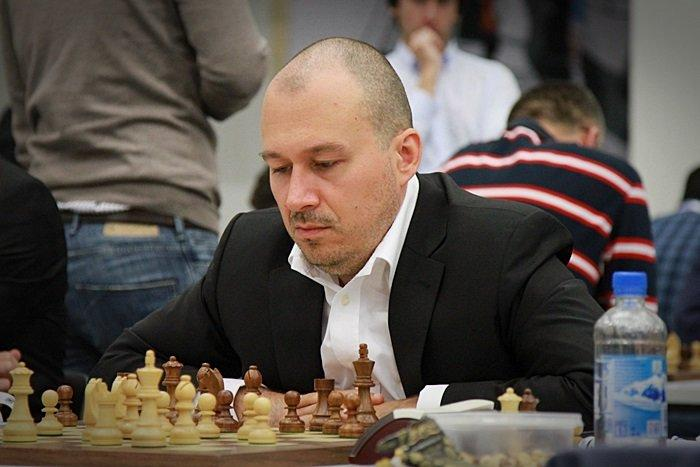
- Aleksandar Čoloviḱ in 2014

Personal information
- Born: January 6, 1976 (age 50) Skopje, Macedonia

Chess career
- Country: North Macedonia
- Title: Grandmaster (2013)
- Peak rating: 2516 (November 2013)

Aleksandar Čoloviḱ (Macedonian: Александар Чоловиќ) is a Macedonian chess grandmaster. In 2016, Čoloviḱ was elected as a General Secretary of the Association of Chess Professionals and in 2019 he was elected as a president of the same association.

== Personal life ==
Čoloviḱ was born in Skopje in 1976, and holds a BA in English Language and Literature. He speaks the English, Spanish, Italian, Russian, Macedonian, Serbian and Bulgarian languages.

He has one sister, biologist Ana Colovic Lesoska.

== Chess career ==
Čoloviḱ won the Malaga Open in 2005. He participated in 3 Chess Olympiads and 2 European Team Championships. He has also won 18 national team titles in Macedonia, and scored the best result (according to percentage) on board 4 with 5.5 out of 7 at the European Club Cup in 2015 in Skopje, and had the best result on the Macedonian team (7 out of 10) at the 42nd Chess Olympiad.

Čoloviḱ has also worked as a chess coach, with his student, Marina Brunello, winning a gold medal at the 43rd Chess Olympiad. In 2017, with Čoloviḱ coaching the Macedonian women national team, the team came in 20th place at the European Team Chess Championship in Crete.
