= Association of Chess Professionals =

Non-profit organisation to benefit professional chess players

The Association of Chess Professionals (ACP) is a non-profit organisation which aims to protect the rights of professional chess players, address their concerns and to promote chess worldwide through the organisation of high level chess tournaments and maintaining a ranking system of the top professionals.

Besides these activities, the ACP encourages and promotes the civil engagement of chess players into the decision-making processes of FIDE, the world chess body. This was particularly evident with the formation of the joint ACP-FIDE panel Anti Cheating Committee (renamed to Fair Play Commission in 2018).

In 2014 the ACP announced the initiation of the Veteran's Programme along with FIDE, which seeks to provide a stipend to a few deserving veteran players who could benefit from such support. – since then 18 veterans were awarded with an annual stipend.

At the summer of 2015 the ACP united about 1100 chess professionals (International Masters, Grand Masters, International Arbiters and Organisers) from 85 countries. Most of the world's top players, including the previous World Champion Vishwanathan Anand can be found among the ACP members.

== ACP Board ==
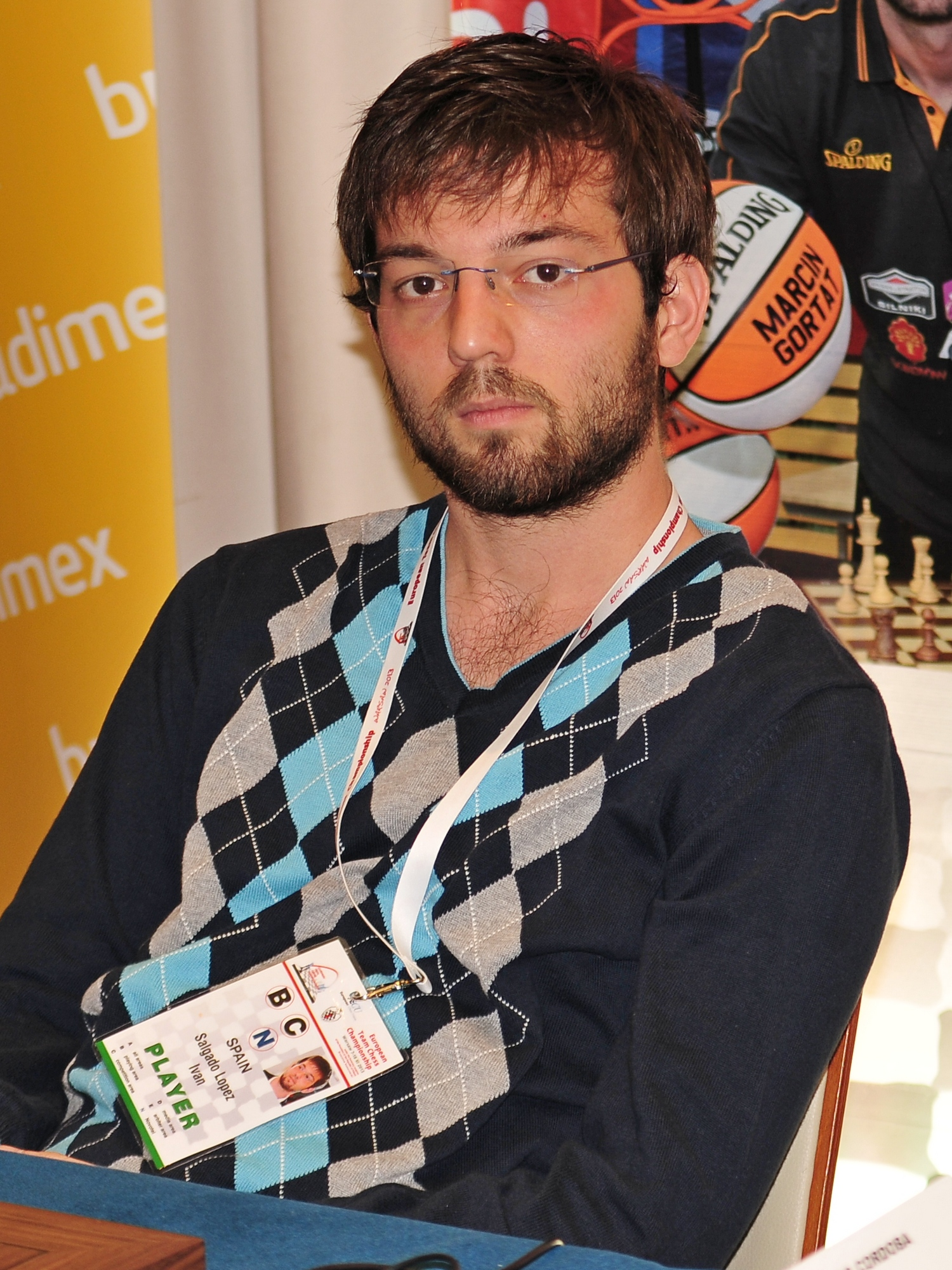
Iván Salgado López (2013)

Consisted of ACP President Aleksandar Colovic, ACP Board Director and Deputy President Yuri Garrett, ACP General Secretary Beatriz Marinello, ACP Treasurer Laurent Freyd, ACP Tour Director Pavel Tregubov and Board Members Jesús García Valer, Aleksandra Dimitrijevic, Gunnar Bjornsson, Iván Salgado López, Sergei Beshukov and Maria Emelianova.

The ACP Board coordinated all activities of the ACP, including:

- Organization of the high-level chess events
- Consultations of the ACP members on topical issues
- Veteran's support and anti-cheating programs
- Development of recommendations for FIDE, national federations and other members of the chess society on the actual problems
- Dialogue with the members through the ACP Newsletter as well as open dialogue on internet
- Conduction of opinion polls – the ACP is the only organization in the chess world that develops and conducts polls on a regular basis
- ACP Tour – the permanent up-to-date calculation of the player's performance throughout the year, with the winners receiving wild cards to prestigious tournaments worldwide
- The ACP Board is an international team of [chess] professionals united by the main aims of the organization: to protect the rights of all the actors in the chess society as well as to promote the game of chess worldwide. All members of the ACP have the right to be elected as well as to vote for the candidates of the ACP Board. The ACP Board coordinates all the activities of the ACP on a voluntary basis.
- Members of the Board were in constant contact with each other using all possible means of communications. About once a month there was a common gathering of the board members, when issues are discussed live (over a conference call or, if possible, in person).
- For decision-making within the Board, all proposals were voted upon by each member. For most decisions a majority is sufficient, but the most critical ones require the support of 2/3rd of the Board.

== ACP Tour and Tournaments ==
The ACP Tour is the unique system that unites about 100 high-level chess tournaments in 25 countries. Best players of the ACP Tour qualify to participate in the annual ACP Cup – one of the most prestigious events of the global chess calendar. The idea and points system of the ACP Tour was envisioned by Pavel Tregubov, who managed the technical details from 2004 to 2006. During 2007–2011 the ACP Tour was managed by Yannick Pelletier. Finally, from 2012, Tregubov once again took the role of the ACP Tour Coordinator.

Based on the rankings of the ACP Tour, the top performing players in the ACP Tour received wildcards to important international events. Maxime Vachier-Lagrave went on to reach the semi-finals in the 2013 World Cup, after qualifying due to his results on the tour. Dozens of other grandmasters have received wildcards for prestigious tournaments like Tata Steel Chess and Poikovsky.

During the period of 2012–2015, the ACP organised seven world-class tournaments with the participation of world's best players: The ACP Golden Classic 2014 in Bergamo, Italy, the ACP Women Cup in Tbilisi, the Women's World Rapid and Blitz Championship in Batumi, the ACP Golden Classic in Amsterdam (2012), the ACP Cup in Riga (2013) and European – ACP Women's Rapid Championship in Kutaisi (2015). More than 150 players have participated in these events where prizes over US$750,000 were at stake.

== History ==
The ACP was founded in June 2003 as a non-profit organization, the catalyst for its foundation being disagreement with the European Chess Union and professional players during 2003 European Individual Chess Championship in Turkey. The first players meeting organized during that event by IM Almira Skripchenko, GM Pavel Tregubov, and GM Igor Glek was followed by the formation of an initiative group headed by the same players.

The first ACP Board started its work in 2004 with: ACP President GM Joël Lautier, secretary GM Bartłomiej Macieja, Treasurer IM Almira Skripchenko, Deputy Treasurer GM Pavel Tregubov, Board members GM Igor Glek, WIM Anna Hahn, GM Vladimir Kramnik, GM Peter Heine Nielsen, and GM Yannick Pelletier. First members of the ACP were such prominent players as GM Viswanathan Anand, GM Péter Lékó, and GM Judit Polgár.

The organization has been compared to the Professional Chess Association, which was established by Garry Kasparov and Nigel Short as an organization under which to play their 1993 World Championship having broken away from FIDE. However, unlike the PCA, which was in competition with FIDE over the running of the world championship, the ACP initially stated that they "hope to work together with FIDE, as well as other international and national chess bodies" . In March 2005, however, Lautier commented that "at present FIDE avoids any contact with us, does not respond to our mails, and we don't expect any positive changes of the situation."

The ACP was extremely critical of FIDE on a number of issues, including the selection of Libya as the site for the 2004 Championships (thus putting the ability of Israeli players to take part under question) and aspects relating to the contracts with players in that championship.

As well as these political activities, the ACP organized a number of online chess tournaments (open only to its members) on the Playchess server (run by Chessbase). On 31 July 2004, at a press conference held during the Dortmund chess tournament, Lautier announced plans for the inaugural ACP tour in which the eight ACP members who perform best in tournaments over the course of a year (as determined by a points scoring system) will play in a final event (the ACP Masters) to determine the best player of the season .

Recently, there has been contact and co-operation between ACP and FIDE, and many ACP suggestions have been approved by FIDE to improve the conditions of the players. Also some ACP officials have been involved in FIDE anti cheating committees. Due to this increased influence, ACP has managed to push through many important changes in the FIDE regulations, raising the prize funds and improving the financial conditions of the professional chess players.

On July 13, 2023, the ACP announced its dissolution due to declining membership and funds.

== ACP development ==
As the first act of his presidency in December 2011, Emil Sutovsky outlined the basis of his program, which was centered around the fostering of the interest of chess professionals.

Main guidelines:

- the development of a think tank for promoting professional chess and organizing top-level events
- the renewal of the communication strategy of the ACP, with special attention being paid to the mainstream and new media
- working with corporate sponsors based on the transparency and time-effective decision process of the ACP
- the increase in membership and representativeness
