= Pavel Tregubov =

Russian-French chess grandmaster (born 1971)

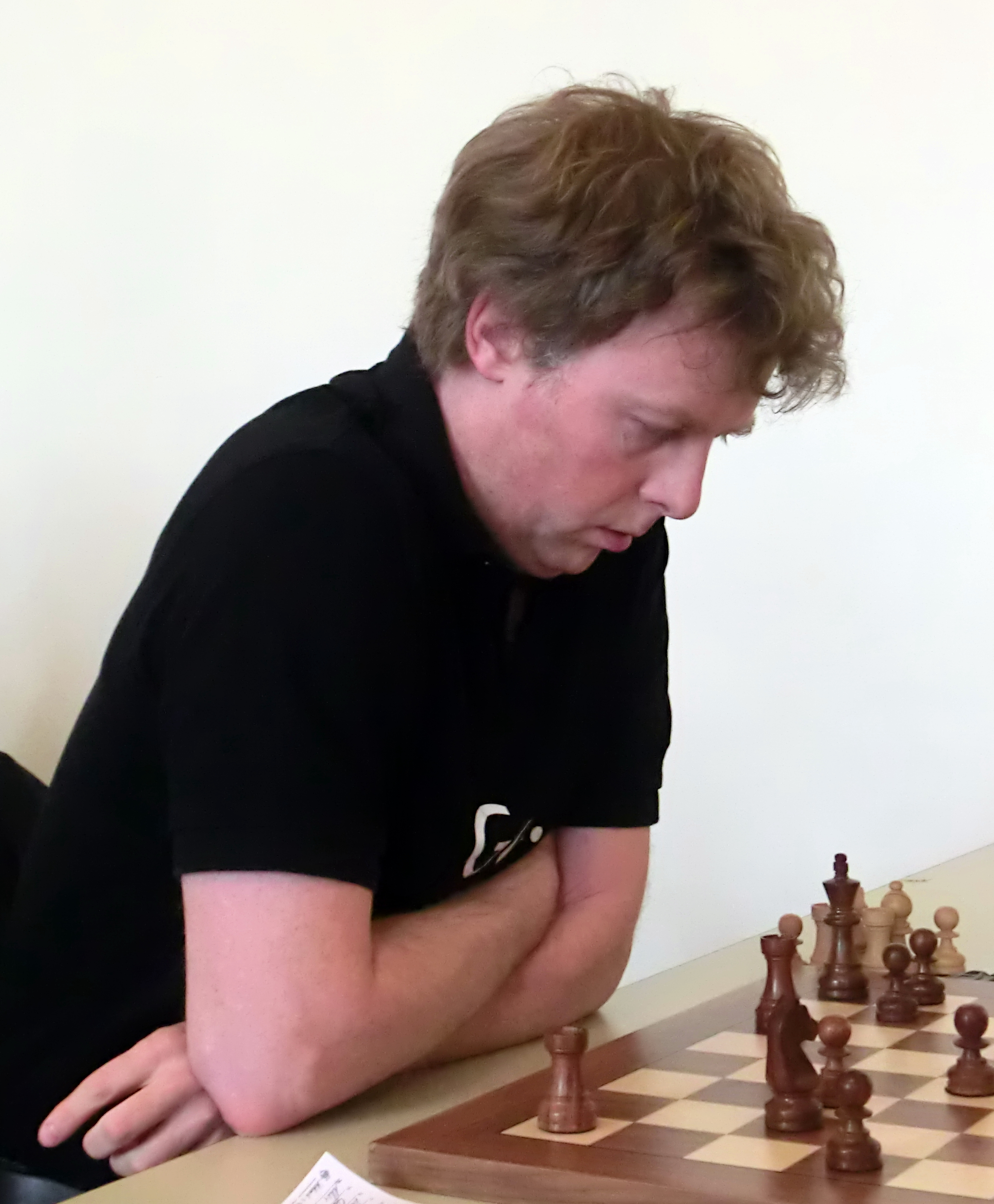

Personal information
- Born: Pavel Vladimirovich Tregubov; 21 December 1971 (age 54) Krasnodar, Russian SFSR, Soviet Union
- Spouse: Alexandra Kosteniuk (m. 2015)

Chess career
- Country: Russia (until March 2023); France (since March 2023)
- Title: Grandmaster (1994)
- FIDE rating: 2538 (July 2026)
- Peak rating: 2658 (July 2008)
- Peak ranking: No. 56 (October 2003)

Pavel Vladimirovich Tregubov (Russian: Па́вел Влади́мирович Трегу́бов; born 21 December 1971) is a Russian chess player who represents France. He was awarded the title Grandmaster by FIDE in 1994. Tregubov was European champion in 2000.

He is one of the founders of the Association of Chess Professionals (ACP), for which he is currently the ACP Tour director. Tregubov previously served as president, treasurer and board director.

== Career ==
Tregubov won the Corsica Masters tournament in 1997. In 1999 he tied for first place with Simen Agdestein and Mikhail Gurevich in the Cappelle-la-Grande Open. Tregubov won the inaugural European Individual Chess Championship in 2000 in Saint-Vincent scoring 8 points out from 11 games. He is also the winner of the 4th Pivdenny Bank Chess Cup, held in 2008. The following year, Tregubov competed in the FIDE World Cup, from which he was eliminated in the first round after losing to Varuzhan Akobian by 7–9. In October 2011 he tied for 3rd–15th in the open section of the 15th Corsican Circuit.

Tregubov is one of the major practitioners of the Sicilian Taimanov Variation.

On 3 March 2023, Tregubov switched from the Russian to the French federation; at the same time, his wife Aleksandra Kosteniuk changed to the Swiss federation.

== Personal life ==
In 2015 Pavel Tregubov married Alexandra Kosteniuk.

Together with 43 other Russian elite chess players, Tregubov signed an open letter to Russian president Vladimir Putin, protesting against the 2022 Russian invasion of Ukraine and expressing solidarity with the Ukrainian people.

== Notable games ==
- Pavel Tregubov vs Rustam Kasimdzhanov, FIDE World Ch 2000, Slav Defense: Czech Variation (D17), 1-0
- Boris Kantsler vs Pavel Tregubov, EU Clubs Cup 2003, Sicilian Defense: Alapin Variation, Smith-Morra Declined (B22), 0-1
- Pavel Tregubov vs Andrew Greet, EU Club Cup 2006, Queen's Indian Defense: Fianchetto, Nimzowitsch Variation (E15), 1-0
