= Nino Maisuradze =

Georgian-French chess player (born 1982)

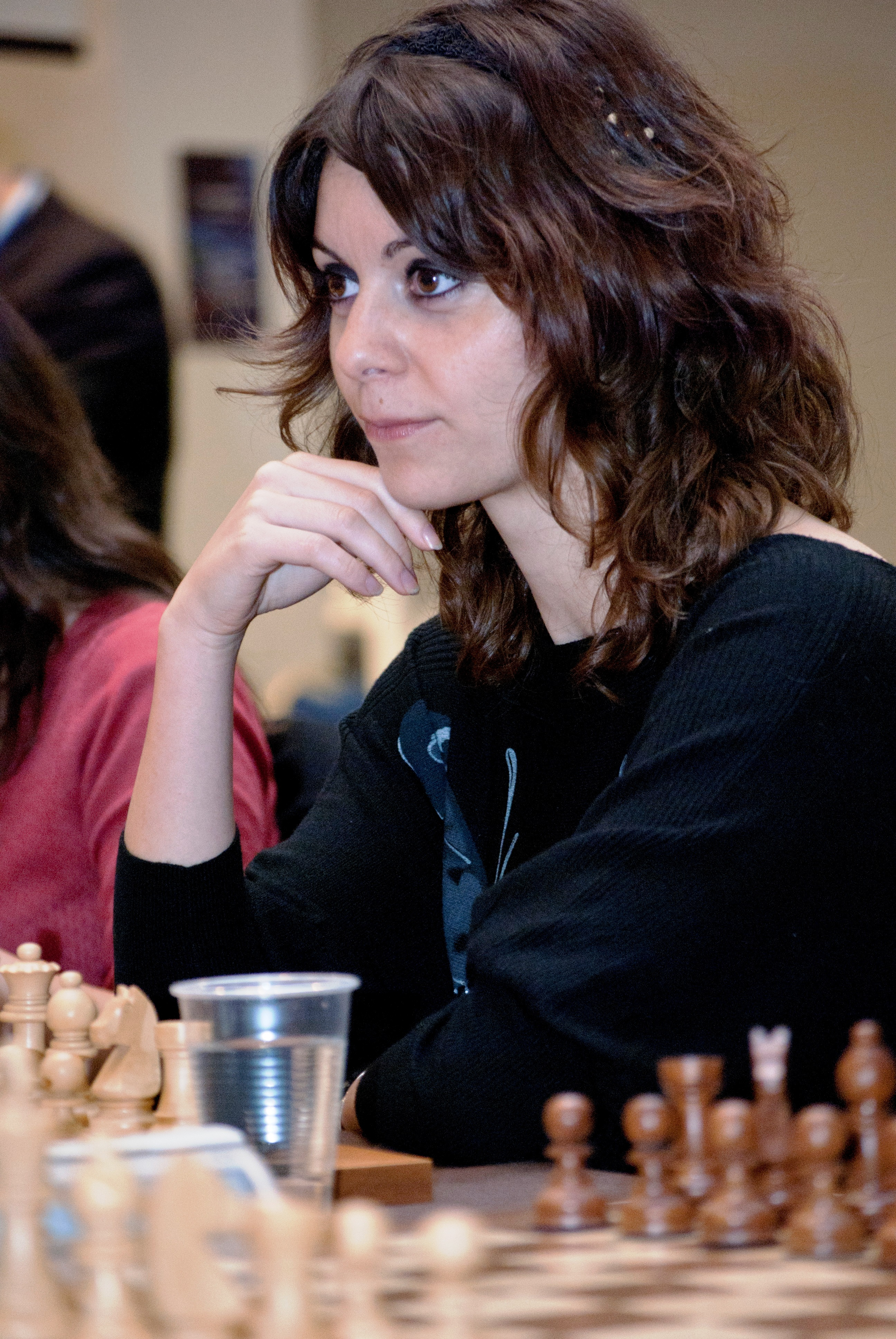
- Nino Maisuradze in 2011

Personal information
- Born: 13 June 1982 (age 44) Tbilisi, Georgian SSR, Soviet Union
- Spouse: Alexandr Fier (m. 2012)

Chess career
- Country: Georgia (until 2009); France (since 2009)
- Title: Woman Grandmaster (2009)
- Peak rating: 2349 (September 2014)

Nino Maisuradze (Georgian: ნინო მაისურაძე; born 13 June 1982) is a Georgian and French chess player. She was awarded the title of Woman Grandmaster by FIDE in 2009. Maisuradze is a two-time French women's champion.

== Career ==
Maisuradze was awarded the title International Woman Grandmaster (WGM) in 2009 after winning International competitions in Croatia and France.

She won the French women's classic chess championship in 2013 and 2014. She won as well the French women's rapid chess championship in 2016 and 2018.

She held the title Woman Champion of Francophone countries in 2017 and 2018.

Maisuradze won an individual gold medal on 1st board at the Women's Mitropa Cup in 2010 (Switzerland).

She was also the women's vice-champion of France in 2011 and 2015.

She represented the French National Team in the 2010 (Russia), 2012 (Turkey), and 2016 (Azerbaijan) Women's Chess Olympiads, but was omitted from the French team for the 2014 (Norway) edition, despite being the reigning national champion. The fact made the choice of team selector very controversial and criticised worldwide. Even more when right after the Olympiad Maisuradze rewon the National Championship again without any defeat, making a 22-game streak without losing against the Olympiad team members.

She represented France in the European Team Championships in 2011 (Greece), taking 5th place, and in 2013 (Poland).

Thanks to the 7th place at the 2012 Istanbul Olympiad, the French National Women's Team qualified for the honorable World Team Championship among the Best 10 Teams of the World, which she represented in 2013 (Kazakhstan).

She also took part in a friendly female match: France - Indonesia played in 2013, in Jakarta.

In the French Club Championship (Top 12), Maisuradze plays for the Alsatian team Bischwiller, winning the French Championship 4 times in mixed and women's categories.

The region of Alsace awarded her with a medal of honour.

The president of the French Republic François Hollande awarded her with an honorable Vase of Elysée twice.

== Personal life ==
Maisuradze was born in Tbilisi, Georgia, where she graduated from Georgian State University, obtaining the International Law master's degree. She moved to France in 2003, where she was a student at Alliance Française in Paris. Later, she continued studying at Pantheon University at the Faculty of Law.

Being mostly autodidactic, she speaks several languages: Georgian, French, English, Russian, Italian, and Portuguese.

Maisuradze had a child in 2013 with Brazilian Grandmaster Alexandr Fier.
