= Adham Kandil =

Egyptian chess grandmaster (born 2001)

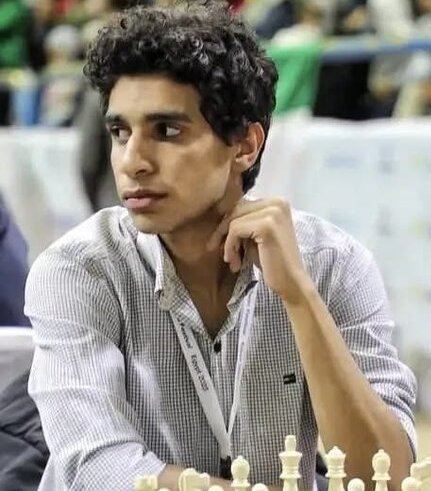

Personal information
- Born: December 19, 2001 (age 24) Cairo, Egypt

Chess career
- Country: Egypt
- Title: Grandmaster (2025)
- Peak rating: 2390 (August 2026)

Adham Kandil (Arabic: ادهم قنديل, born 19 December 2001) is an Egyptian chess grandmaster.

== Chess career ==
He won the Zone 4.2 Individual Chess Championship in 2016.

In November 2025, he won the Arab Chess Championship, becoming Egypt's seventh grandmaster in the process. He was also given a financial reward by the Egyptian Chess Federation.
