= Andrés Rodríguez Vila =

Uruguayan chess grandmaster (born 1973)

Personal information
- Born: December 19, 1973 (age 52)

Chess career
- Country: Uruguay
- Title: Grandmaster (1997)
- Peak rating: 2575 (January 1996)

Andrés Rodríguez Vila is a Uruguayan chess Grandmaster, ranked as the top player from Uruguay in a 2019 chess tournament held in Arica, Chile.

== Career ==
He has represented Uruguay at multiple Chess Olympiads, including 2004, 2010, 2012, 2016 and 2018.

He qualified for the Chess World Cup 2009, where he lost to eventual champion Boris Gelfand in the first round.

In 2012, he organised the 7th Continental Championship.
