= Walaa Sarwat =

Egyptian chess player (born 1960)

Personal information
- Born: March 19, 1960 (age 66)

Chess career
- Country: Egypt
- Title: International Master (1996)
- Peak rating: 2405 (November 2009)

Walaa Sarwat (born 1960) is an Egyptian chess player.

== Career ==
Razik represented Egypt at the 2006 Chess Olympiad at first reserve, scoring 3 out of 6.

He qualified for the Chess World Cup 2009, where he was defeated by Vugar Gashimov in the first round.
