= Tomi Nybäck =

Finnish chess grandmaster (born 1985)

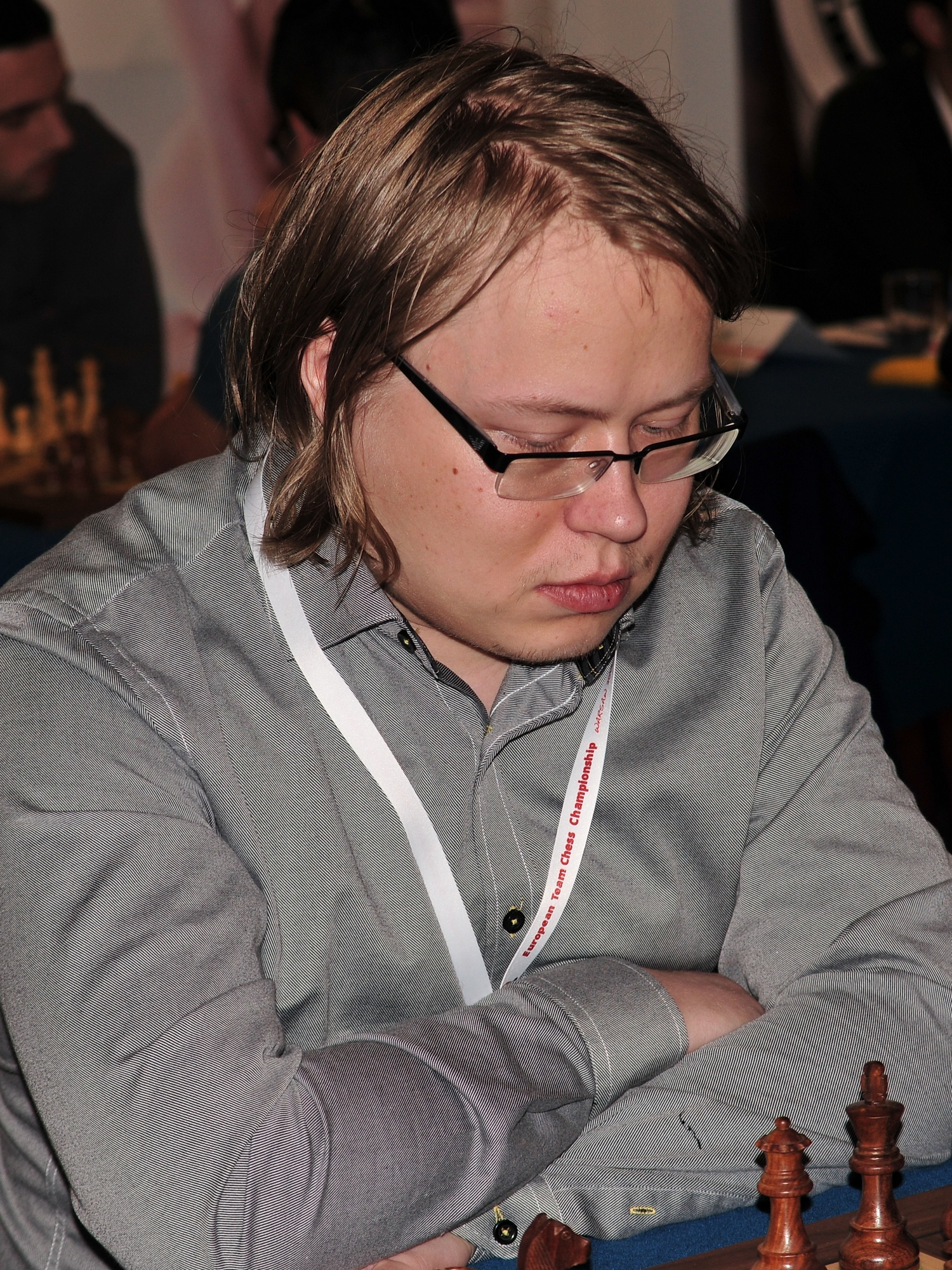

Personal information
- Born: 3 April 1985 (age 41) Järvenpää, Finland

Chess career
- Country: Finland
- Title: Grandmaster (2003)
- FIDE rating: 2601 (July 2026)
- Peak rating: 2656 (January 2011)
- Peak ranking: No. 73 (April 2009)

Tomi Nybäck (born 3 April 1985 in Järvenpää) is a Finnish chess grandmaster and poker player. He won the Finnish Chess Championship in 2008 and is the No. 1 ranked Finnish player as of September 2023.

He played for the Finnish team in the Chess Olympiads of 2002, 2004, 2006, 2008, 2010, 2012 and 2014. He is one of the few players to have a positive lifetime score against former World Champion Magnus Carlsen.

== Chess career ==
Nybäck tied for first with Shakhriyar Mamedyarov and Mateusz Bartel in the European Under-18 championship of 2002, taking the bronze medal on tiebreak. In April 2002, he won the First Saturday GM B tournament in Budapest. In 2003 he won the Heart of Finland chess tournament in Jyväskylä.

Nybäck won the Finnish Championship in 2008 with a score of 9/9 points. In the same year he tied for second with Emanuel Berg at the Najdorf Memorial round-robin tournament (category 15, 2608) in Warsaw.

Nybäck tied for second place in the European Individual Chess Championship of 2008 by scoring 8/11, and this result allowed him to qualify for the Chess World Cup 2009. In the 2009 edition, he scored again 8/11, tying for first with other nine grandmasters. At the World Cup Nybäck knocked out Dmitry Andreikin in the first round to reach round two, where he was eliminated by Peter Svidler after tiebreaks.

In 2010, he took part in the Corus B tournament at Wijk aan Zee and scored 5/13.

== Notable games ==
- Svetozar Gligoric vs Tomi Nybäck, Rilton Cup 2003-4 2004, Benko Gambit: Accepted (A59), 0-1
- Santul Kosmo vs Tomi Nybäck, Rilton Cup 2006, Pirc Defense: General (B07), 0-1
- Tomi Nybäck vs Jens Henrichsen, Politiken Cup 2007, English Opening: Anglo-Indian Defense (A17), 1-0
- Tomi Nybäck vs Magnus Carlsen, Olympiad 2008, Queen's Gambit Declined: Harrwitz Attack (D37), 1-0
