= Alexandr Fier =

Brazilian chess grandmaster (born 1988)

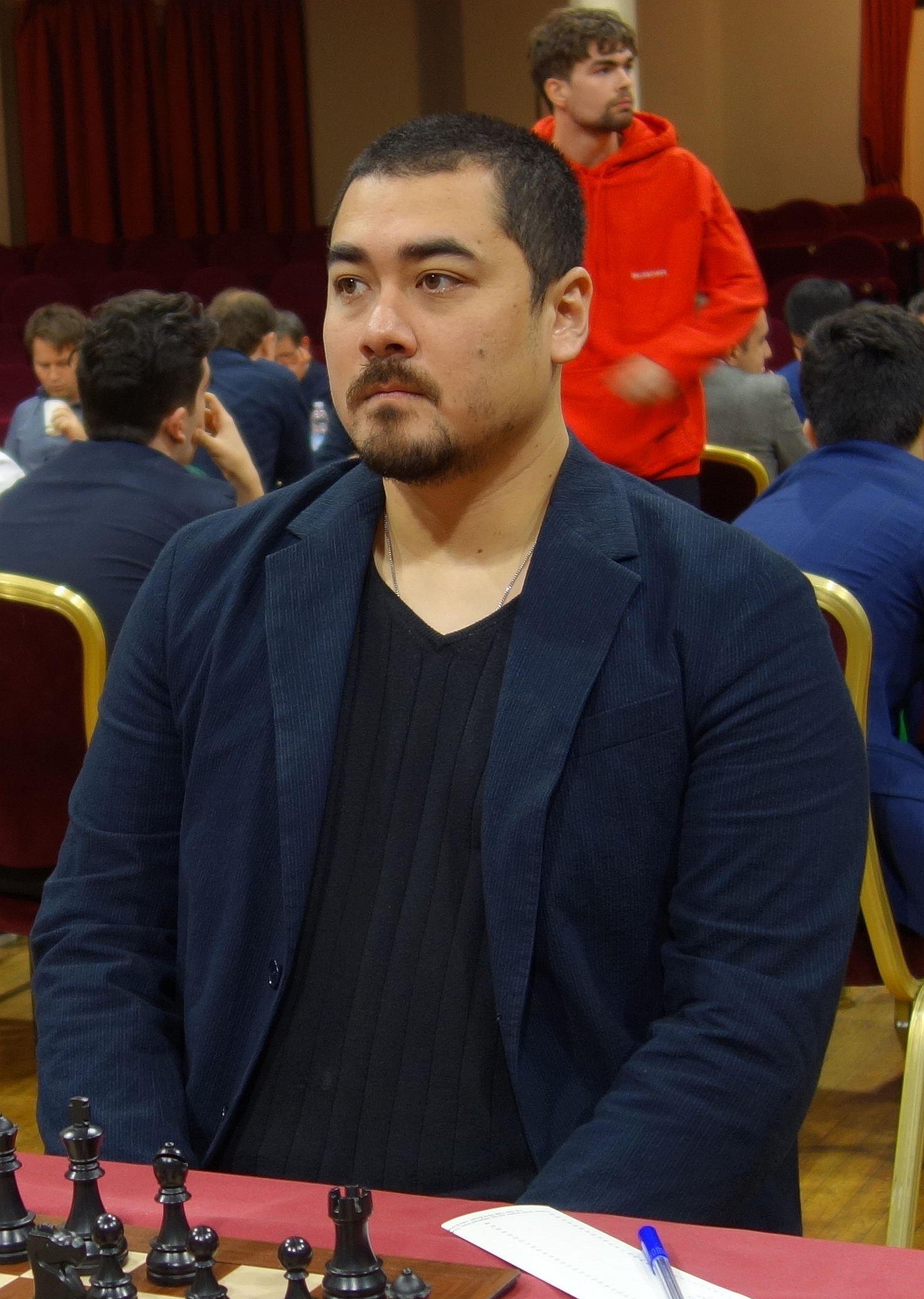
- Alexandr Fier in 2023

Personal information
- Native name: Japanese: Takeda Sakai (武田坂井); Portuguese: Hilário dos Santos
- Born: Alexandr Hilário Takeda Sakai dos Santos Fier; 11 March 1988 (age 38) Joinville, Santa Catarina, Brazil
- Spouse: Nino Maisuradze (m. 2012)

Chess career
- Country: Brazil
- Title: Grandmaster (2007)
- FIDE rating: 2557 (July 2026)
- Peak rating: 2653 (November 2009)
- Peak ranking: No. 76 (November 2009)

Alexandr Hilário Takeda Sakai dos Santos Fier (Japanese: 酒井武田; born 11 March 1988) is a Brazilian chess grandmaster. He competed in the FIDE World Cup in 2009, 2011, 2013, 2015, 2017, and 2023.

== Career ==
Fier won five gold medals at the Pan American Youth Chess Festival: in the Under 10 division in 1996 and 1997, the Under 12 in 2000, the Under 14 in 2002, and the Under 18 in 2005. He also won the South American Junior Championship in 2006, 2008, and 2009.

Fier won the Brazilian Chess Championship in 2005, 2018., 2019 (held in January 2020), and 2022.

In 2006, he won the "65 Anos da Federação Paulista" tournament (São Paulo Federation 65th Anniversary) in São Paulo.

Fier won the large Open of Sants, Hostafrancs & La Bordeta in Barcelona in 2009 and 2014. Also in 2009, he took part for the first time in the World Cup, where he was knocked out by Alexander Khalifman in the first round. In the 2011 edition, Fier beat Wang Yue by 1½-½ in the first round to advance to round two. Here he was eliminated by Alexander Morozevich. Two months later, Fier won the 2nd Latin American Cup in Montevideo edging out Diego Flores on tiebreak. In the Chess World Cup 2013, Fier defeated Radoslaw Wojtaszek in round one to advance to round two, in which he lost to B. Adhiban and thus was eliminated from the competition. In 2015 and 2017, he was disqualified from the World Cup in the first round, losing to Julio Granda Zuniga and Étienne Bacrot, respectively. On the 10th edition of the FIDE World Cup, held in Baku, in 2023, Fier defeated grandmaster Gábor Nagy, from Hungary, 1½-½, in the first round. He was knocked out of the competition in the second round by Ray Robson, losing the second game with the black pieces after drawing the first one.

Fier has played on the Brazilian national team in the Chess Olympiad, the World Team Chess Championship, the Pan American Team Chess Championship, and the Mercosur Chess Olympiad. In 2009, his team won the gold medal in the latter two competitions.

== Personal life ==
Born in Joinville, Brazil, Fier had a child in 2013 with Woman Grandmaster Nino Maisuradze. Fier is of Japanese and Italian descent.
