= Hichem Hamdouchi =

Moroccan chess grandmaster (born 1972)

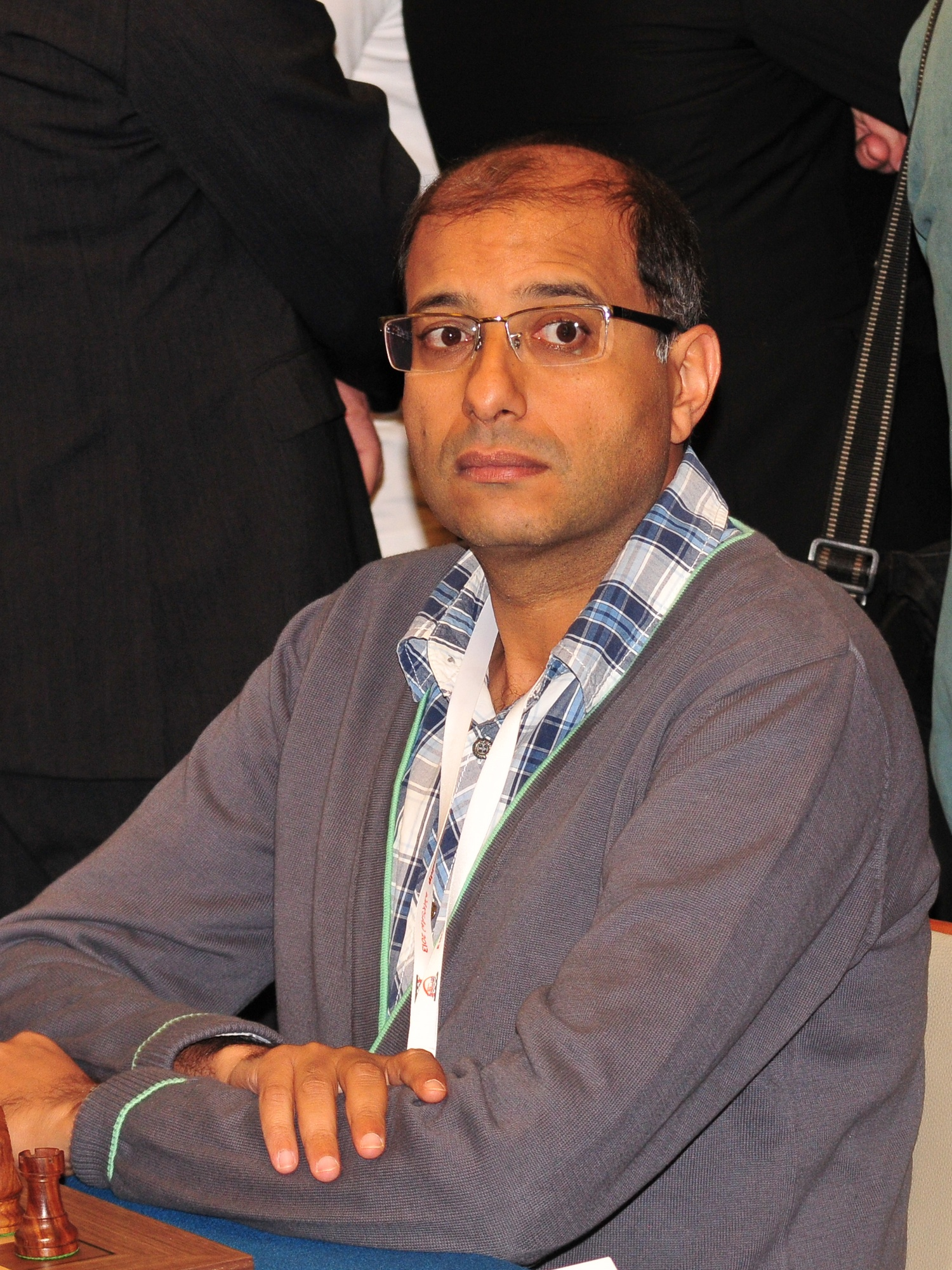
- Hichem Hamdouchi at the European Team Chess Championship in Warsaw, 2013

Personal information
- Native name: هشام الحمدوشی
- Born: 8 October 1972 (age 53) Tangier, Morocco
- Spouse: Adina-Maria Hamdouchi

Chess career
- Country: Morocco (until 2008; since 2016); France (2009–2016)
- Title: Grandmaster (1994)
- FIDE rating: 2491 (July 2026)
- Peak rating: 2628 (July 2011)
- Peak ranking: No. 77 (January 2003)

Hichem Hamdouchi (Arabic هشام الحمدوشی; born 8 October 1972, in Tangier) is a Moroccan chess grandmaster.

== Biography ==
Hamdouchi has won the Moroccan Chess Championship eleven times, first in 1988 at 15 years old, when he was first allowed to play in important tournaments. In the same year, in the tournament of Casablanca, he was noticed for his talent and qualified for the national team of Morocco to participate in the Chess Olympiad of 1988 in Thessaloniki. At the age of 17 he managed to qualify in the African selection for the World Team Chess Championship in Lucerne. Here he made remarkable victories over Jeroen Piket, John Fedorowicz and Ye Jiangchuan.

In 1990 at the 29th Chess Olympiad in Novi Sad he scored 8/11, after which he took a break from chess for his studies. At the age of 20, in 1992 he played successfully in several European tournaments. In the same year he played at the 30th Chess Olympiad with a performance of 7.5/11. He won in Sitges and Ceuta in 1992, where he picked up his first grandmaster norm. In 1993 he started studying economics at the University of Montpellier. In December 1993 he won the masters tournament in Montpellier with 7/9, gaining his second norm. A few months later he was awarded the grandmaster title. At that time he was one of the three African grandmasters, the other two being the Tunisian players Slim Bouaziz and Slim Belkhodja.

In 1994 he won the Masters tournament in Casablanca and in 1995 he became Arab Chess Champion in Dubai, a performance which he would repeat in 2002 and 2004. In 1996 he won again the strong grandmaster tournament in Montpellier, where he studied business now. After finishing his studies in 1998, he settled down in Spain and won tournaments in Dos Hermanas, Bolzano and Djerba.

He won once again in Montpellier in 2001 and in the same year became African Chess Champion ahead of South African Watu Kobese. In 2002 he won the open in Nice, Belfort and Coria del Rio. In January 2003 he was ranked 75th in the world with a rating of 2615.

In the FIDE World Chess Championship 2004 in Tripoli he progressed to the third round, where he was eliminated 0.5-1.5 by eventual runner-up Michael Adams. In 2005 he won in Castelldefels, in 2006 in Salou and in 2007 in Saint-Affrique. At the European Club Cup in October 2007, he played for the Basque team Gros Xake Taldea.

In 2009 Hamdouchi transferred to the French Chess Federation. In 2013 he won the French Chess Championship and was a member of the French team that won the silver medal at the European Team Chess Championship in Warsaw. In 2016 he transferred back to the Moroccan Chess Federation.

He is married to Woman Grandmaster Adina-Maria Hamdouchi.
