= Ahmed Adly =

Egyptian chess grandmaster (born 1987)

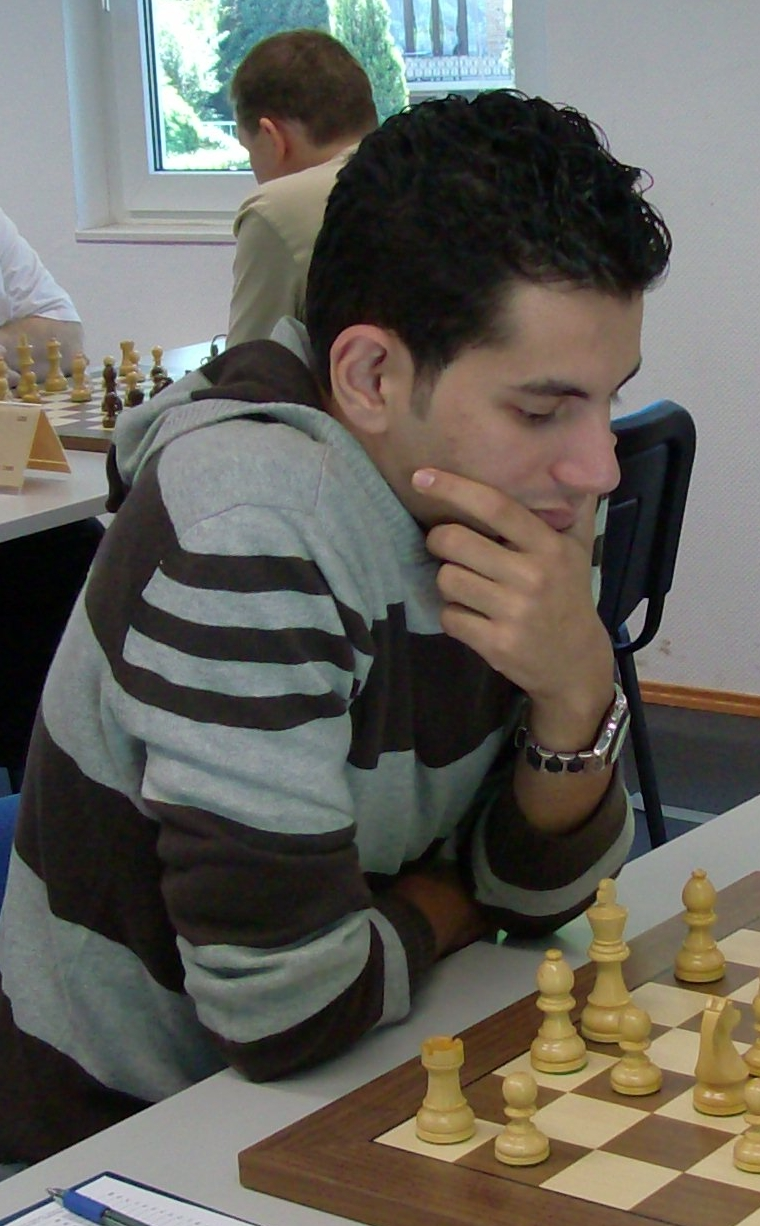

Personal information
- Born: 18 February 1987 (age 39) Cairo, Egypt

Chess career
- Country: Egypt
- Title: Grandmaster (2005)
- FIDE rating: 2582 (October 2026)
- Peak rating: 2640 (January 2011)

Ahmed Adly Ibrahim Abdelshahid (Arabic: أحمد عدلي, born 18 February 1987) is an Egyptian chess Grandmaster. As a chess prodigy, Adly acquired his International Master title in 2001 at the age of 14 at the U20 Championship of 2004. Adly then went on to earn his Grandmaster title in 2005, making him the first Egyptian and the youngest ever African to achieve this feat. As of May 2022, Adly holds the second-highest rating in Egypt and Africa.

== Personal life ==
Adly was born in Cairo, Egypt, on 18 February 1987. At the age of 6, Adly's father, Adly Ibrahim, taught Adly Chess wherein he discovered his talent. Adly had been practicing fencing and had already acquired the third place for his age group. Nevertheless, as Adly grew older, Ibrahim noticed his talent and directed him towards his chess career.

Adly graduated from the Arab Academy for Science, Technology and Maritime Transport with a degree in Business Administration in 2010. Subsequently, Adly went on to start his own chess Academy, Adly Chess Academy, in Cairo. Adly believed that had he been given the help, he would have risen to greater heights and thus intended to provide this assistance to younger players.

== Chess career ==
=== Chess prodigy ===
Adly started his professional chess pursuit in 1997 at the age of 10, wherein he acquired the seventh place at the World Youth Chess Championship for the U-14 Category in Cannes, France. Adly then succeeded in acquiring the third place in the World Championship U18 in 2004 in Greece, at which point he believes his chess career was defined. Adly went on to win the Arab Youth Championship four times and acquiring his grandmaster title in 2005. In 2005 Adly also won the African Chess Championship, wherein he acquired his Norms. Adly then went on to participate in several competitions, focusing his effort towards his chess career.

=== Notable achievements ===
Adly tied for 1st-5th with Gabriel Sargissian, Shakhriyar Mamedyarov, Igor-Alexandre Nataf and Pentala Harikrishna in the Reykjavík Open 2006. In 2007, Adly won the World Junior Chess Championship, becoming the first player from an African country to win a major title. In 2008 he tied for 1st-3rd with Zigurds Lanka and Dorian Rogozenko at Hamburg. He qualified for the Chess World Cup 2009 and was knocked out by Viktor Bologan in the first round. In April 2020, he won the Sunway Sitges International Online Chess Open, defeating IM Liam Vrolijk of the Netherlands. In February 2021, he won the Africa Online Open with a score of 7.5/9.

On the national level, Adly won the Egyptian championship in 2007 and 2009. On the International level, In 2004, Adly qualified for the FIDE World Championship Knockout Tournament (2004), but lost the first-round match, after rapid tiebreaks, to Sergei Rublevsky. In 2005, Adly won the Arab Junior Chess Championship and qualified once more, but he was again eliminated in the first round of the FIDE World Cup (2005), this time by Ruslan Ponomariov. Adly qualified for the World Cup (2011), but was forced to withdraw after the first game due to illness. His misfortune continued at the World Cup (2013), for which he qualified, but was unable to attend due to travel difficulties. Adly was the runner up in the African Chess Championship of 2015, and thereby qualified for the Chess World Cup 2015. At the World Cup (2015), he lost to Ukrainian super-GM Vassily Ivanchuk in the first round.

Adly also won two gold medals in the African Chess Olympics and one silver medal in 2005 in different formats. In 2007, Adly acquired all three gold medals, becoming the first Egyptian to do so. In 2009, Adly participated in the Mediterranean Chess Championship and acquired the first place. Adly also won the African Chess Championship four times, in 2005, 2011, 2019 and 2021.

== Playing style ==
Adly had expressed admiration towards Mikhail Tal and his attacking style, having been inspired by him. In youth, Adly had been an attacking player but has since evolved to a more universal playing style. Adly has expressed admiration for several other players' play styles, including former World Chess Champion Magnus Carlsen, who has also expressed his acknowledgement of Adly's win against him in the 2006 Reykjavik Open.

== Notable games ==
- A Adly vs V Laznicka, 2007 1-0
- A Adly vs I Vovk, 2007 1-0
- Carlsen vs A Adly, 2006 0-1
- Rapport vs A Adly, 2015 0-1
- A Adly vs Kosten, 2003 1-0
- A Adly vs G Meier, 2007 1-0
- A Adly vs A Hesham, 2021 1-0
- Kamsky vs A Adly, 2007 1/2-1/2
- H Hayrapetyan vs A Adly, 2007 0-1
- Movsesian vs A Adly, 2015 0-1
