= Zimbabwe Chess Championship =

The Zimbabwean Chess Championship is the national chess championship of Zimbabwe.

== Winners ==
Year	Champion
1997	Robert Gwaze
2017	Zhemba Jemusse
2018	Emerald Mushore
2019	Zhemba Jemusse
2025	Tapiwa Jele
2026	Roy Mwadzura
