= Mohamed Tissir =

Moroccan chess player (born 1976)

Personal information
- Born: 27 November 1976 (age 49)

Chess career
- Country: Morocco
- Title: International Master (1999)
- Peak rating: 2490 (October 2006)

Mohamed Tissir (Arabic: محمد تيسير; born 27 November 1976) is a Moroccan chess player.

== Chess career ==
He won the African Chess Championship in 1999, the Moroccan Chess Championship in 1996, 1999 and 2005, and has represented his country in a number of Chess Olympiads. He has also won a gold medal at the 36th Chess Olympiad of Palma de Mallorca (Spain) in 2004 and also won the Arab games held in Jordan in 1999.

He played in the Chess World Cup 2000, where he finished at the bottom of Group D, and the FIDE World Chess Championship 2004, where he was defeated by Alexey Dreev in the first round.

Tissir also played in the 2021 World Cup, where he was defeated by David Paravyan in the first round.

He is also a chess coach.
