= Shahenda Wafa =

Egyptian chess player (born 1998)

Personal information
- Born: July 15, 1998 (age 27)

Chess career
- Country: Egypt
- Title: Woman Grandmaster (2017)
- Peak rating: 2175 (March 2019)

Shahenda Wafa (born 1998) is an Egyptian chess player who holds the title of Woman Grandmaster (2017). She is a four-time African Women's Chess Champion (2017, 2018, 2022 and 2026).

== Chess career ==
Wafa won the 2014 Arab Girls Championship and African Girls Championship in age category U16. She was joint winner with Sabrina Latreche of the 2014 Women's Arab Chess Championship. In 2015, she won African Youth and Junior Girls Chess Championships.

Wafa won the Women's African Chess Championship twice in a row; in 2017 in Oran and in 2018 in Livingstone. She qualified for the Women's World Chess Championship 2018 (November).

Wafa played for Egypt in the Women's Chess Olympiads:

- In 2012, at fourth board in the 40th Chess Olympiad (women) in Istanbul (+3, =2, -4),
- In 2014, at fourth board in the 41st Chess Olympiad (women) in Tromsø (+4, =0, -4),
- In 2016, at fourth board in the 42nd Chess Olympiad (women) in Baku (+2, =4, -2),
- In 2018, at third board in the 43rd Chess Olympiad (women) in Batumi (+6, =1, -3).

Wafa played for Egypt in the World Team Chess Championship:

- In 2015, at second board in the 5th Women's World Team Chess Championship 2015 in Chengdu (+1, =0, -8).

In 2013, she was awarded the FIDE Woman International Master (WIM) title and received the FIDE Woman Grandmaster (WGM) title three years later.

Wafa qualified for the Women's Chess World Cup 2023, losing 1.5 — 0.5 to Mai Narva in the first round.

Her sister Shrook Wafa also is a Woman Grandmaster.
