= Shrook Wafa =

Egyptian chess player (born 1997)

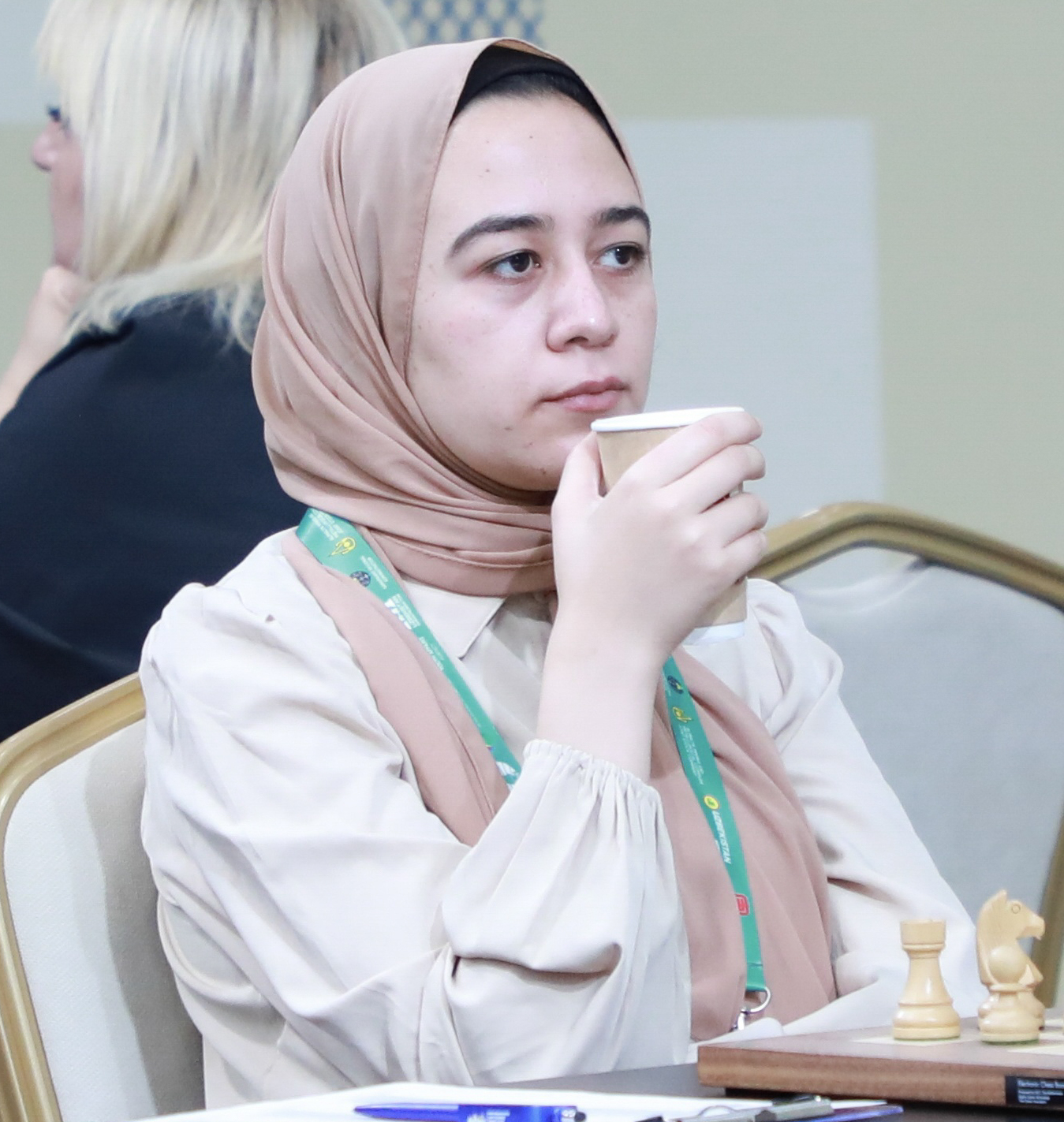
- Wafa in 2025

Personal information
- Born: 13 May 1997 (age 29)

Chess career
- Country: Egypt; FIDE (2024) (Note: Several Egyptian players briefly switched federations in 2024 due to FIDE suspending membership of the Egyptian Chess Federation.)
- Title: Woman Grandmaster (2013)
- Peak rating: 2214 (November 2025)

Shrook Wafa (born 13 May 1997) is an Egyptian chess player who holds the title of Woman Grandmaster.

She won the Women's African Chess Championship in 2013. Thanks to this achievement she earned the title of Woman grandmaster (WGM) and qualified for the Women's World Chess Championship 2015.

She has won the Women's African Chess Championship a further four times: 2014, 2016, 2019 and 2025.

In the Women's World Chess Championship 2015 she was knocked out in the first round by the second seed Ju Wenjun.

Her sister Shahenda Wafa also is a Woman Grandmaster.

In 2025 she announced in a twitter post that going forward she will be representing Ireland.
