= Moroccan Chess Championship =

Following are the official winners of the national Moroccan Chess Championships from 1965 to date.

== Winners (men) ==
#	Year	City	Winner
1	1965	Tétouan	Mustafa Ahmed Bakali
2	1966	Tétouan	Mustafa Ahmed Bakali
3	1968	Rabat	Ahmed Bennis
4	1969	Rabat	Mokhtar Kadiri
5	1970	Rabat	Abderrahman Nejjar
6	1971	Rabat	Mohamed Belarbi
7	1972	Casablanca	Ahmed Bennis
8	1973	Rabat	Mustafa Ahmed Bakali
9	1975	Rabat	Khalid Chorfi
10	1976	Tétouan	Khalid Chorfi
11	1978	Tétouan	Abdellah Ait Hmidou
12	1980	Tétouan	Abderrahim Ouniche
13	1981	Tétouan	Bachir Sbiaa
14	1982	Casablanca	Mohamed Moubarak Rian
15	1984	Chefchaouen	Abdellah Ait Hmidou
16	1985	Marrakesh	Mohamed Moubarak Rian
17	1986	Casablanca	Mohamed Arbouche
18	1987	Casablanca	Zakaria Bennis
19	1988	Rabat	Hichem Hamdouchi
20	1989	Casablanca	Hichem Hamdouchi
21	1990	Casablanca	Khalid Chorfi
22	1992	El Jadida	Hichem Hamdouchi
23	1993	Casablanca	Hichem Hamdouchi
24	1994	Casablanca	Hichem Hamdouchi
25	1995	Casablanca	Hichem Hamdouchi
26	1996	Meknes	Mohamed Tissir
27	1997	Tangier	Hichem Hamdouchi
28	1998	Casablanca	Abdelaziz Onkoud
29	1999	Casablanca	Mohamed Tissir
30	2000	Casablanca	Samir Bentafrit
31	2001	Casablanca	Hichem Hamdouchi
32	2002	Casablanca	Hichem Hamdouchi
33	2003	Marrakesh	Hichem Hamdouchi
34	2004	Mohammedia	Hichem Hamdouchi
35	2005	Tétouan	Mohamed Tissir
36	2006	Marrakesh	Rachid Hifad
37	2009	Tangier	Mokliss El Adnani
38	2013	Casablanca	Ali Sebbar
39	2015	Tétouan	Khalid Becham
40	2016	Rabat	Mokliss El Adnani
41	2022	Azilal	Zouhair Naciri
42	2023	Marrakesh	Noureddine Messala
43	2024	Khemisset	Noureddine Messala
44	2025	Berkane	Yasser Hadj Kholti
45	2026	Laayoune	Mohamed-Mehdi Aithmidou

== Winners (women) ==
#	Year	Winner
1	1983	Bouchra Kadiri
2	1984	Bouchra Kadiri
3	1985	Jamila Chouaibi
4	1986	Leila Nassimi
5	1989	Fatima Achkar
6	1991	Leila Nassimi
7	1992	Sofia Bensouda
8	1993	Leila Nassimi
9	1994	Nawal EL Amri
10	1995	Amina Oubaaqa
11	1996	Manal El Messioui
12	2000	Hind Bahji
13	2001	Hind Bahji
14	2002	Hind Bahji
16	2004	Jamila Yougane
17	2005	Hind Bahji
18	2006	Laila Elamri
19	2013	Firdaous Mayar El Idrissi
20	2015	Firdaous Mayar El Idrissi
21	2016	Salma Sassioui
22	2022	Aya Alaoui Belghiti
23	2023	Ahlam Makhlouf
24	2024	Sarah El Barbry
25	2025	Sarah El Barbry
