= Essam El-Gindy =

Egyptian chess grandmaster (born 1966)

Personal information
- Born: 14 July 1966 (age 60) Cairo, Egypt

Chess career
- Country: Egypt
- Title: Grandmaster (2008)
- FIDE rating: 2407 (August 2026)
- Peak rating: 2527 (October 2008)

Essam El-Gindy (also known as Essam El-Gendy and Esam Mohamed Ahmed Nagib; born 14 July 1966) is an Egyptian chess Grandmaster and FIDE Trainer.

He is a former Egyptian Champion (2002), African Champion (2003) and has represented Egypt in three Chess Olympiads (1996, 1998, 2014). He has competed at two FIDE World Chess Championships (1999, 2004) and seven Chess World Cups (2007, 2009, 2011, 2013, 2017, 2019, 2021).

== Career ==
In 2003, El-Gindy won the delayed 2002 Egyptian Chess Championship and was shared first (third on tiebreak) with 8 / 10 at the Golden Cleopatra Open. In the same year he won the African Chess Championship with 7½ / 9 and scored there a first GM norm, and a second GM norm at the Arab Chess Championships with score 7 / 9. Eventually he reached his final norm in 2008 with 9 / 12 at the Alushta Summer Open.

He made his debut at World Championship level with a first round 2–0 exit to Ulf Andersson in the FIDE World Chess Championship 1999.

El-Gindy's success at the African Chess Championship of 2003 earned him a spot in the FIDE World Chess Championship 2004, losing in the first round to Aleksej Aleksandrov 1½–½. He qualified for the Chess World Cup six times via the African Championships. His third place on tiebreak in 2007 secured a place at the Chess World Cup 2007 where he scored an upset win in the first round against former FIDE World Champion and eventual quarter-finalist Ruslan Ponomariov, but he went on to lose the match after rapid tiebreaks 2½–1½. A fourth-place finish in 2009 saw him qualify for the Chess World Cup 2009, going out in the first round to Ponomariov 1½–½. Second place in 2011 saw him qualify for the Chess World Cup 2011, going out in the first round to Zoltán Almási 2–0. Third place on tiebreak in 2013 saw him qualify for the Chess World Cup 2013, where he went out in first round 2–0 to Leinier Domínguez.

In 2009, El-Gindy won the Arab Chess Championship, scoring 7 / 9.

El-Gindy won the 2014 AIDEF (Note: Association Internationale Des Échecs Francophones, a FIDE affiliated association of French-speaking countries) Chess Championships on tiebreak with a score of 7½ / 9.

== Team results ==
El-Gindy has competed in various team tournaments at both club and international level. He has won three team golds and an individual gold and bronze at international level, representing Egypt. For his clubs, El-Gindy has won four team golds and a team silver medal as well as gold, two silvers and two bronze medals for his individual play.

=== International results ===
Tournament	Board	Individual result	Team result
Olympiad Yerevan 1996	First	1½ / 7	66th
Olympiad Elista 1998	First	5 / 10 (60th)	38th
All-Africa Games 2003	Second	4 / 6	Gold
Pan Arab Games 2007	First	5½ / 8	Gold
All-Africa Games 2007	First	8½ / 9 (Gold)	Gold
World Team Champ. 2011	Third	½ / 4	10th
All Africa Games 2011	Third	5½ / 7 (Bronze)	Gold
World Cities Champ. 2012	First	0 / 2	Group phase
Olympiad Tromsø 2014	Fifth	2 / 6	23rd

=== Club results ===
Tournament	Team	Board	Individual result	Team result
Arab Club Champ, Damascus 2003	Al-Sharkia (EGY)	Second	4½ / 7	Gold
Arab Club Champ, Agadir 2005	Al-Sharkia (EGY)	Second	6½ / 8 (Bronze)	Gold
Arab Club Champ, Amman 2006	Al-Sharkia (EGY)	Second	6 / 8 (Gold)	Gold
Arab Club Champ, Khartoum 2007	Al-Sharkia (EGY)	First	6 / 8 (Bronze)	Gold
Asian Club Cup, Al-Ain 2008	Al-Ain B (UAE)	Reserve	5 / 7 (Silver)	Eighth
Arab Club Champ, Tunis 2009	El-Dakhlia (EGY)	Third	6 / 8 (Silver)	Silver
