= Bilel Bellahcene =

French-Algerian chess grandmaster (born 1998)

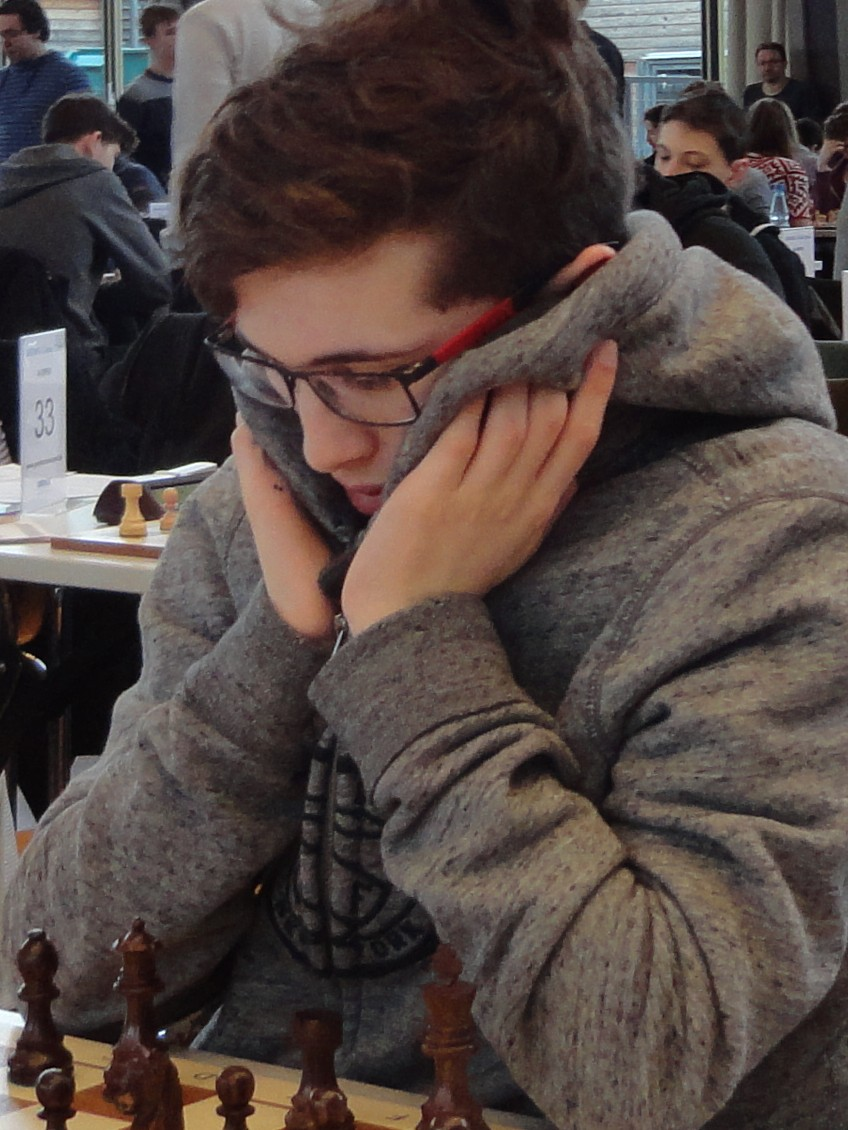
- Karlsruhe, 2016

Personal information
- Born: March 14, 1998 (age 28) Strasbourg, France

Chess career
- Country: France (until 2018); Algeria (since 2018)
- Title: Grandmaster (2018)
- FIDE rating: 2495 (July 2026)
- Peak rating: 2560 (March 2019)

Bilel Bellahcene (born March 14, 1998) is an Algerian chess player. He holds the title of Grandmaster (GM). Born in Strasbourg, France, he changed his federation from France to Algeria in July 2018.

== Chess career ==
As of June 2026, Bellahcene is the top-ranked player in Algeria.

Bellahcene represented Algeria on Board 1 in the 2018 Chess Olympiad.

Bellahcene won the 2019 FIDE Zone 4.1 Championship with a perfect 9 out of 9 to qualify for the Chess World Cup 2019. In the first round, he came close to upsetting Hikaru Nakamura, holding the much higher-rated player to two draws in the classical games before losing in the tie-breaks.

Bellahcene also won the 2022 Gibraltar Chess Festival, tied with Balasz Csonka.

In May 2025, Bellahcene won the African Chess Championship held at Cairo, Egypt.

In June 2026, Bellahcene again won the African Chess Championship held at Jwaneng, Botswana.
