= Mohamed Ezat =

Egyptian chess player (born 1978)

Personal information
- Born: July 29, 1978 (age 47)

Chess career
- Country: Egypt
- Title: International Master (2000)
- Peak rating: 2490 (November 2015)

Mohamed Ezat (born 29 July 1978) is an Egyptian chess player.

== Career ==
Ezat has represented Egypt at multiple Chess Olympiads, including 2006, 2008 and 2010,

He qualified for the Chess World Cup 2009, where he was defeated by Teimour Radjabov the first round.
