= Sandipan Chanda =

Indian chess grandmaster (born 1983)

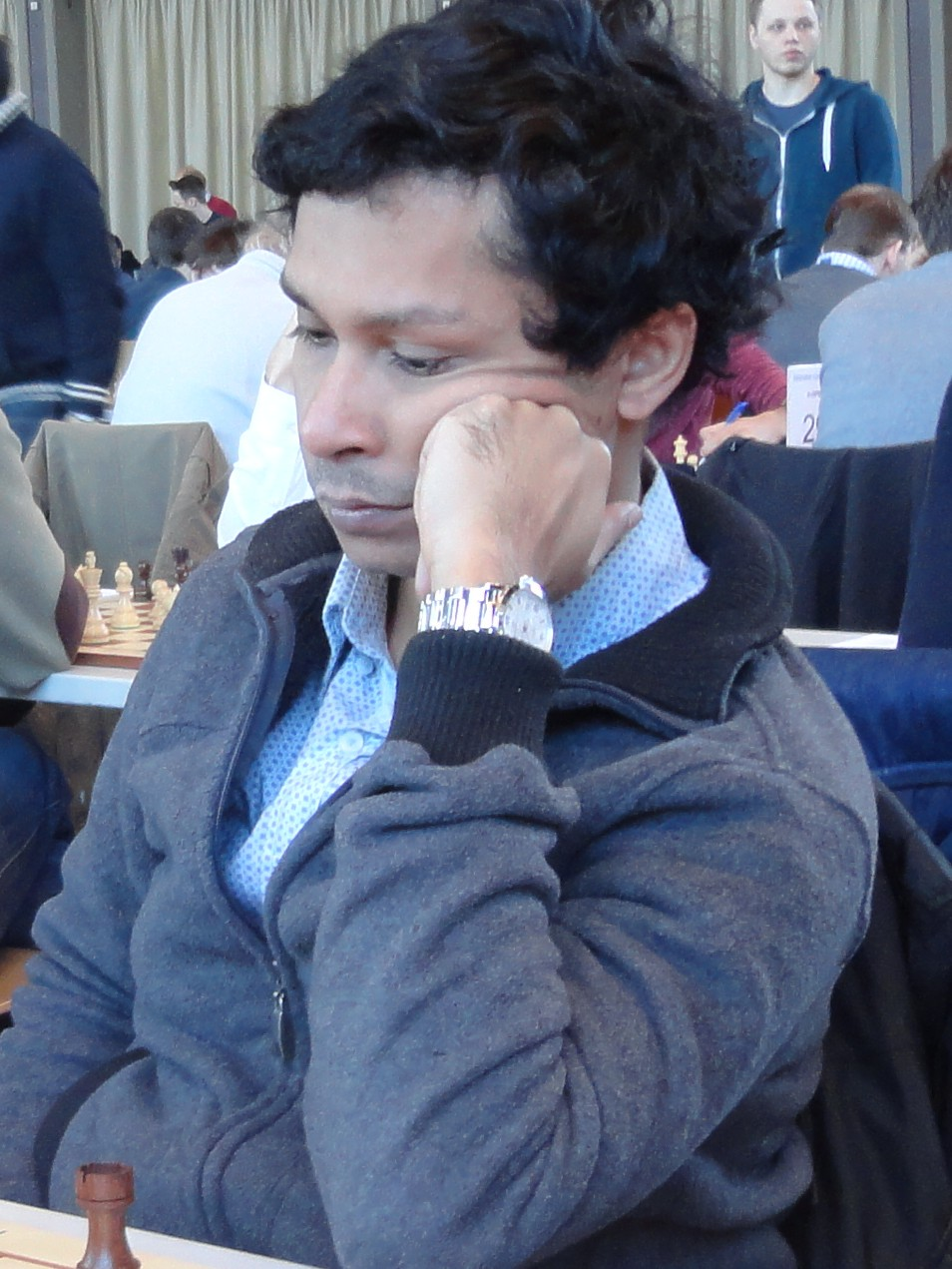
- Sandipan Chanda, Karlsruhe 2016

Personal information
- Born: 13 August 1983 (age 42) Kolkata, India

Chess career
- Country: India
- Title: Grandmaster (2003)
- FIDE rating: 2468 (July 2026)
- Peak rating: 2656 (May 2011)
- Peak ranking: No. 92 (July 2011)

Sandipan Chanda (born 13 August 1983) is a chess grandmaster hailing from the city of Kolkata (Calcutta) in the Indian state of West Bengal. He started playing at the age of 9 and became a grandmaster in 2003. In 2004 he won the Curaçao Chess Festival with 7.5/9, a half point ahead of Alexander Shabalov.

Sandipan became interested in chess when he saw people playing on the streets of Kolkata. He initially learnt chess with his first coach, the late Paritosh Bhattacharya, who taught him the rules of chess. He played for India in the Chess Olympiads of 2004, 2006 and 2008. He scored a notable win over Sergei Tiviakov in 2007 at a tournament in Ottawa playing as White, which was selected for inclusion in John Nunn's The Mammoth Book of the World's Greatest Chess Games. He was Viswanathan Anand's second for the World Chess Championship 2013 match.

In 2016 and 2017 he won the Open Dutch Chess Championship.
