= Khaled Abdel Razik =

Egyptian chess player (born 1975)

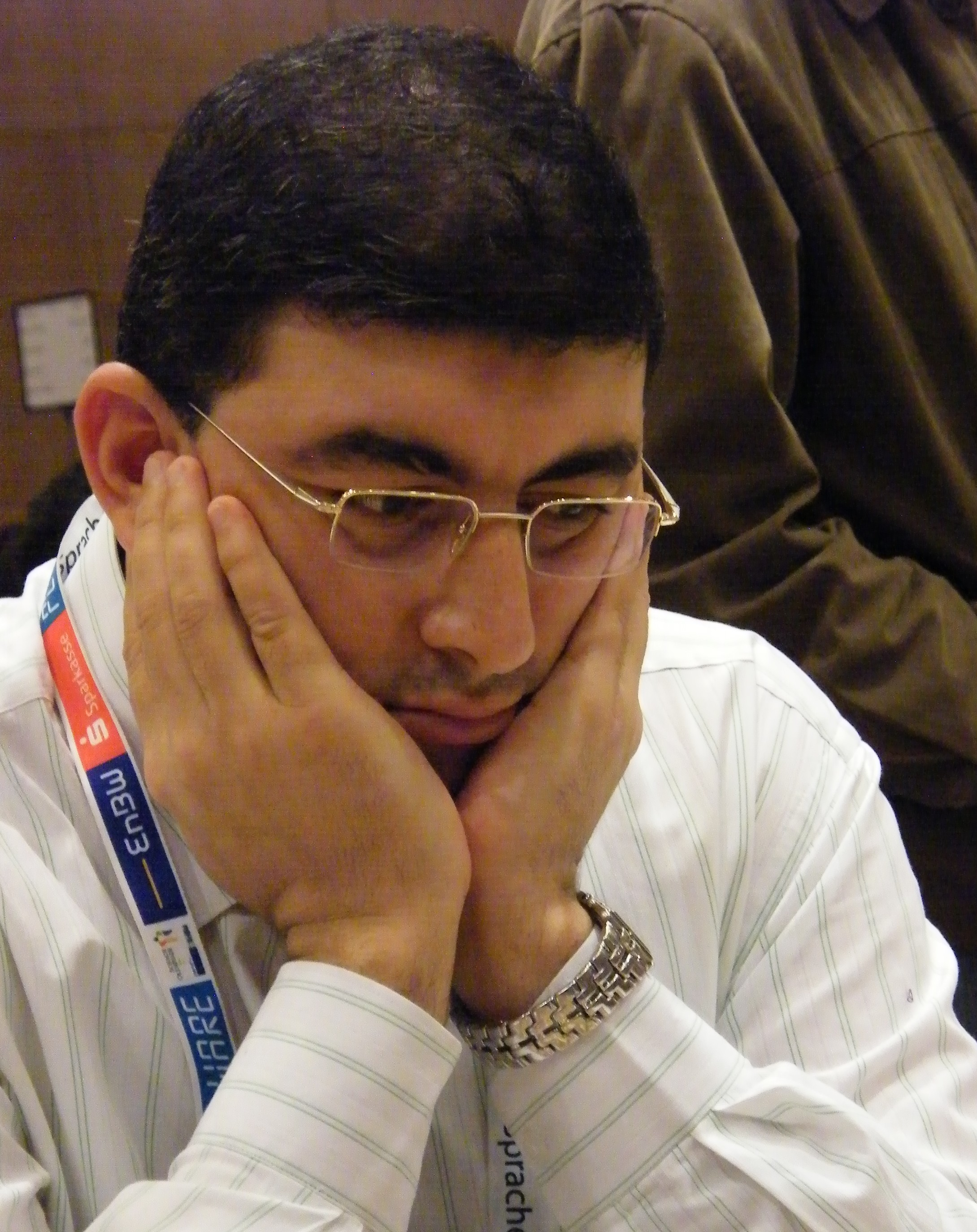

Personal information
- Born: February 25, 1975 (age 51)

Chess career
- Country: Egypt
- Title: International Master (2009)
- Peak rating: 2480 (May 2010)

Khaled Abdel Razik (born 1975) is an Egyptian chess player.

== Career ==
Razik has represented Egypt at multiple Chess Olympiads, including 2008, 2010 and 2012.

He qualified for the Chess World Cup 2009, where he was defeated by Alexander Morozevich in the first round.
