= Arab Chess Federation =

Arab Chess Federation الاتحاد العربي للشطرنج
- Formation: July 27, 1975
- Headquarters: United Arab Emirates, Sharjah
- Members: 22 member states
- President: Sheikh Dr. Khaled Bin Humaid Alqasimi
- Website: www.arabchess.org

The Arab Chess Federation (ACF) (Arabic: الاتحاد العربي للشطرنج) is a non-profit organization that promotes chess within the Arab world. Though unaffiliated with the Arab League, it includes 22 of the latter's member states.

== History ==
Formed on July 27, 1975, in Damascus, Syria, the federation was established under the motto "Arab as one Nation". Nahed El Khany was the organization's first president.

== Governance ==
  - United Arab Emirates - *President: Sheikh Dr. Khaled Bin Humaid Alqasimi
- Official representatives:
  - Qatar – Al-Mudahka, Mohd - 1st Vice-President
  - Syria – Abbas, Ali - 2nd Vice-President
  - Algeria – Brahim Djelloul, Azzedine - 3rd Vice-President
  - Libya – Ali, Fouzi Fathullah - 4th Vice-President
  - Lebanon – Hammoud, Rawad
  - Yemen – Sallam, Sabri Abdul-Mawla
  - Mauritania – Tajedine, Sidi Mohamed
  - Morocco – Amazzal, Mustapha
  - Palestine – Omar Awad Aljaberi
  - United Arab Emirates – Hassan, Abdullah
  - Syria – Adeeb Zehrawi
- Members:

| Algeria
| Bahrain
| Egypt
| Iraq
| Jordan
| Kuwait
| Lebanon
| Libya
| Mauritania
| Morocco
| Oman
| Palestine
| Qatar
| Saudi Arabia
| Sudan
| Syria
| Tunisia
| United Arab Emirates
| Yemen
| Comoros
| Djibouti
| Somalia
