= Bassem Amin =

Egyptian chess grandmaster (born 1988)

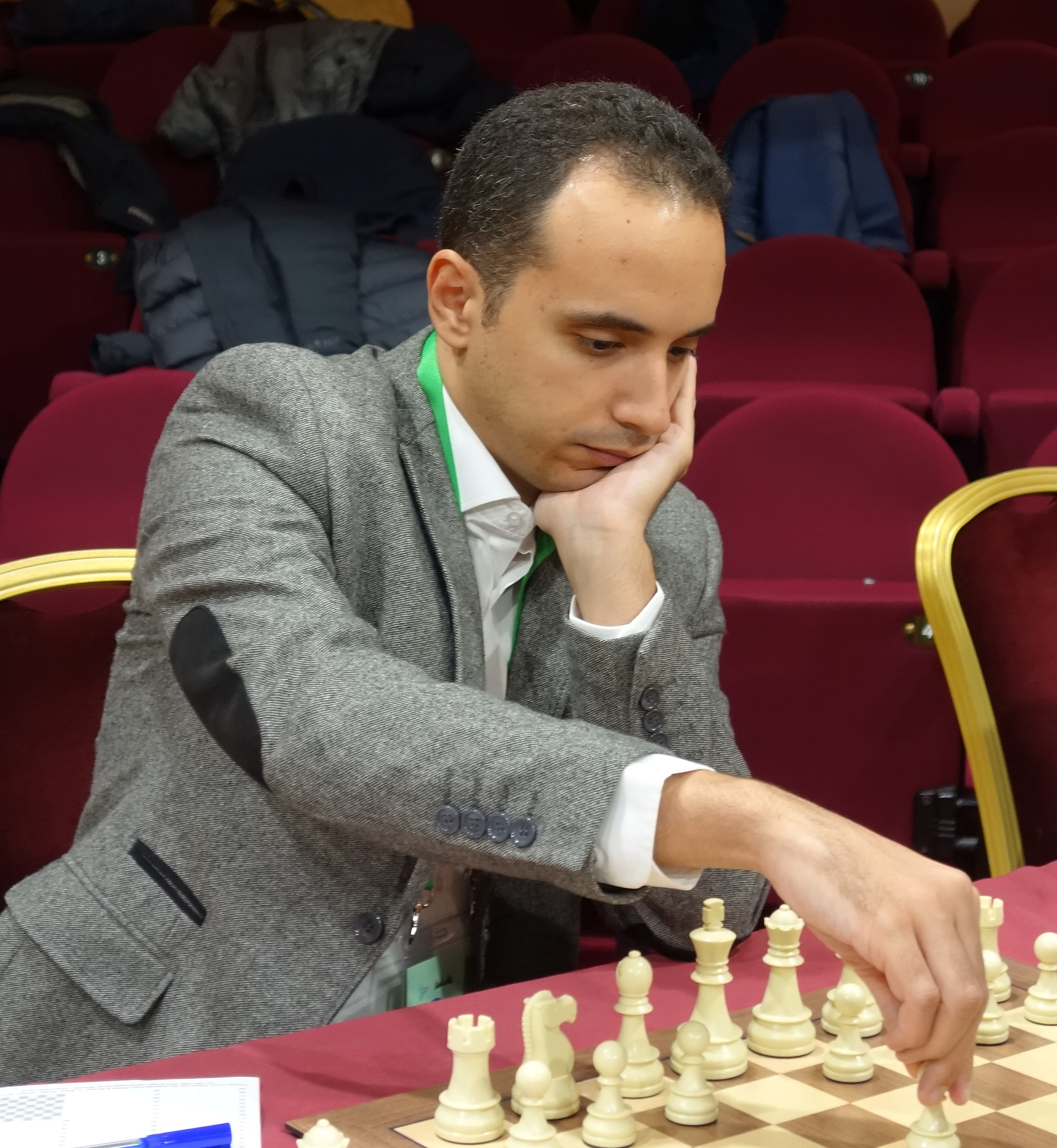
- Amin in 2023

Personal information
- Born: 9 September 1988 (age 38) Tanta, Egypt

Chess career
- Country: Egypt
- Title: Grandmaster (2006)
- FIDE rating: 2608 (September 2026)
- Peak rating: 2712 (January 2019)
- Peak ranking: No. 33 (June 2019)

Bassem Amin (Arabic: باسم أمين; born 9 September 1988) is an Egyptian chess grandmaster and medical doctor. He was awarded the Grandmaster title by FIDE in 2006. Amin is the highest rated Egyptian and African player and the only medical doctor to have a FIDE peak rating of 2700+. Amin has also won the African chess championship seven times, doing so in 2009, 2013, 2015, 2017, 2018, 2022, and 2024.

== Career ==
Early on in his chess career, Amin was the Arab Youth Chess Champion once in the U10 division, once in the U12 division, and twice in the U14 division. He took 4th place in the 2004 World Youth Chess Championship U-16 in Greece. Soon after, he won the 2005 African Junior Chess Championship, qualifying him to participate in the 2005 World Junior Chess Championship.

He won his first Arab Chess Championship title at the 2005 Arab Chess Championship, simultaneously acquiring his first grandmaster norm. In the same year, he won the African championship and took part in World Youth Chess Championship (U18), finishing third.

Arab Champion Under 20 3 times : (Jordan) 2005 ( His 2nd GM norm ), July 2006 and August 2007

African Under-20 Champion, Botswana 2005 ( 3rd GM norm )

Bronze Medalist In World Youth Under 18 (Georgia) 2006

Arab men Champion (UAE) 2006

In 2007, he tied for first with Ashot Anastasian in the Abu Dhabi Chess Festival, with a performance rating of 2747.

Bronze Medalist In World Juniors (Turkey) 2008

He took part in the Chess World Cup 2009 and was knocked out by Vladimir Malakhov in the first round.

Co-Winner of Reykjavik Open 2013

Arab Men Champion UAE 2013

Mediterranean Chess Champion Greece 2014

Scored 8.5 points out of 11 on Board 1 at the 41st World Chess Olympiad, leading the Egyptian National Chess Team to achieve the best result in Egyptian Chess history and win a gold medal in Category B

== Personal life ==
Amin graduated from the faculty of Medicine of the Tanta University in 2012. He is one of eight medical doctors who are also chess grandmasters (along with Alex Sherzer, Helmut Pfleger, Yona Kosashvili, Dan Zoler, Diego Valerga, Zhao Zong-Yuan and Muhammed Batuhan Daştan), the highest rated medical doctor and grandmaster, and the only medical doctor to have achieved a FIDE rating of 2700+.
