= World Open chess tournament =

American chess event (1973-pres.)

The World Open is an annual open chess tournament usually held in Philadelphia. The inaugural event was held in New York in 1973 with 732 players, and was won by Walter Browne.

The tournament is divided into different sections, with typically 100–200 players in the top section. The 1986 edition had as many as 1507 participants, possibly a world record for a chess tournament. It is usually played in the first week of July, over Independence Day Weekend. All editions have been organized by the Continental Chess Association.

== Winners ==
All players finishing equal first are listed; the winners after tie-breaks are boldfaced.

Location	#	Year	Winner	Score
New York City	1	1973	**Walter Browne** (Australia)	9/10
New York City	2	1974	**Bent Larsen** (Denmark)	8½/9
New York City	3	1975	**Pal Benko** (United States); Alan Trefler (United States)	8/9
New York City	4	1976	**Anatoly Lein** (Soviet Union); Bernard Zuckerman (United States)	8/9
Philadelphia	5	1977	**John Fedorowicz** (United States); Ron Henley (United States)	8/9
Philadelphia	6	1978	**Peter Biyiasas** (Canada); Florin Gheorghiu (Romania); Heikki Westerinen (Finland); Inguar Asmundsson (Iceland); Javier Lozano Sanz (Spain); Bernard Zuckerman (United States); Yasser Seirawan (United States)	7½/9
Philadelphia	7	1979	**Haukur Angantysson** (Iceland); Tony Miles (England); Florin Gheorghiu (Romania); Walter Browne (United States); Arthur Bisguier (United States); Bernard Zuckerman (United States); John Fedorowicz (United States)	8/10
Philadelphia	8	1980	**Larry Christiansen** (United States); Roman Dzindzichashvili (Israel); Florin Gheorghiu (Romania); Tony Miles (England); Lawrence Day (Canada)	7½/9
New Paltz	9	1981	**Igor Ivanov** (Canada); Dmitry Gurevich (United States); Joel Benjamin (United States); Michael Rohde (United States)	7½/9
Philadelphia	10	1982	**Nick de Firmian** (United States); John Fedorowicz (United States); Dmitry Gurevich (United States); Eugene B. Meyer (United States)	7/8
New York City	11	1983	**Kevin Spraggett** (Canada); Miguel Quinteros (Argentina); Kamran Shirazi (Iran); Leonid Bass (United States); Vitaly F. Zaltsman (United States)	7/8
Schuylkill	12	1984	**Joel Benjamin** (United States); Boris Kogan (United States); Kevin Spraggett (Canada); Yehuda Gruenfeld (Israel)	6½/9
Philadelphia	13	1985	**Maxim Dlugy** (United States); Dmitry Gurevich (United States); Yehuda Gruenfeld (Israel)	7/9
Philadelphia	14	1986	**Nick de Firmian** (United States)	7½/9
Philadelphia	15	1987	**Boris Gulko** (United States); Tony Miles (England)	8/10
Philadelphia	16	1988	**Maxim Dlugy** (United States)	9/11
Philadelphia	17	1989	**Mikhail Gurevich** (Soviet Union); Alexander Chernin (Soviet Union); Vladimir Epishin (Soviet Union); Gildardo García (Colombia); Michael Rohde (United States); Walter Browne (United States); Lev Alburt (United States); Larry Christiansen (United States); John Fedorowicz (United States); Alexander Ivanov (United States)	7½/9
Philadelphia	18	1990	**Igor Glek** (Soviet Union)	7½/9
Philadelphia	19	1991	**Gata Kamsky** (United States); Alex Yermolinsky (United States); Jóhann Hjartarson (Iceland); Semon Palatnik (Soviet Union)	7½/9
Philadelphia	20	1992	**Grigory Kaidanov** (United States)	8/9
Philadelphia	21	1993	**Alex Yermolinsky** (United States)	7½/9
Philadelphia	22	1994	**Artashes Minasian** (Armenia); Loek van Wely (Netherlands)	7½/9
Philadelphia	23	1995	**Alex Yermolinsky** (United States)	8/9
Philadelphia	24	1996	**Alex Yermolinsky** (United States); Alexander Goldin (Russia)	7½/9
Philadelphia	25	1997	**Alexander Shabalov** (United States)	8/9
Philadelphia	26	1998	**Alexander Goldin** (Russia)	8½/9
Philadelphia	27	1999	**Gregory Serper** (United States); Boris Gulko (United States); Alex Yermolinsky (United States); Joel Benjamin (United States); Alexander Shabalov (United States); Alexander Fishbein (United States); Vladimir Akopian (Armenia); Jaan Ehlvest (Estonia); Igor Novikov (Ukraine); Georgy Timoshenko (Ukraine)	7/9
Philadelphia	28	2000	**Joel Benjamin** (United States); Gregory Serper (United States); Alexander Ivanov (United States); John Fedorowicz (United States); Sergey Kudrin (United States); Jaan Ehlvest (Estonia); Alexander Goldin (Israel); Pavel Blatny (Czech Republic)	7/9
Philadelphia	29	2001	**Alexander Goldin** (Israel); Ilya Smirin (Israel); Leonid Yudasin (Israel); Alexander Onischuk (Ukraine); Yuri Shulman (Belarus); Joel Benjamin (United States); Alexander Ivanov (United States)	7/9
Philadelphia	30	2002	**Kamil Mitoń** (Poland); Aleksander Wojtkiewicz (Poland); Ilya Smirin (Israel); Alexander Onischuk (Ukraine); Artur Yusupov (Germany); Jaan Ehlvest (Estonia); Jonathan Rowson (Scotland); Varuzhan Akobian (Armenia); Benjamin Finegold (United States)	7/9
Philadelphia	31	2003	**Jaan Ehlvest** (Estonia); Ilya Smirin (Israel); Leonid Yudasin (Israel); Nazar Firman (Ukraine); Babakuli Annakov (Turkmenistan); Alexander Onischuk (United States); Alexander Shabalov (United States); Aleksander Wojtkiewicz (United States); Alexander Goldin (United States); Gennadi Zaichik (United States)	7/9
Philadelphia	32	2004	**Varuzhan Akobian** (United States)	7½/9
Philadelphia	33	2005	**Kamil Mitoń** (Poland); Magesh Panchanathan (India)	7½/9
Philadelphia	34	2006	**Gata Kamsky** (United States); Ildar Ibragimov (United States); Jaan Ehlvest (United States); Alexander Ivanov (United States); Joel Benjamin (United States); Aleksander Wojtkiewicz (United States); Vadim Milov (Switzerland); Leonid Yudasin (Israel); Giorgi Kacheishvili (Georgia)	7/9
Schuylkill	35	2007	**Varuzhan Akobian** (United States); Alexander Stripunsky (United States); Hikaru Nakamura (United States); Alexander Shabalov (United States); Julio Becerra (United States); Chanda Sandipan (India); Evgeny Najer (Russia); Leonid Yudasin (Israel); Victor Mikhalevski (Israel)	7/9
Philadelphia	36	2008	**Evgeny Najer** (Russia); Parimarjan Negi (India); Ľubomír Ftáčnik (Slovakia); Alexander Moiseenko (Ukraine)	7/9
Philadelphia	37	2009	**Evgeny Najer** (Russia); Hikaru Nakamura (United States)	7/9
Schuylkill	38	2010	**Viktor Láznička** (Czech Republic)	7½/9
Philadelphia	39	2011	**Gata Kamsky** (United States); Michael Adams (England)	7/9
Philadelphia	40	2012	**Ivan Sokolov** (Netherlands); Alexander Shabalov (United States)	7/9
Arlington	41	2013	**Varuzhan Akobian** (United States); Sergey Erenburg (United States); Alejandro Ramirez (United States); Yury Shulman (United States); Conrad Holt (United States); Yuniesky Quesada Perez (Cuba); Lázaro Bruzón (Cuba); Viktor Láznička (Czech Republic); Tamaz Gelashvili (Georgia); Parimarjan Negi (India)	6½/9
Arlington	42	2014	**Ilya Smirin** (Israel); Illia Nyzhnyk (Ukraine); Conrad Holt (United States)	7/9
Arlington	43	2015	**Aleksandr Lenderman** (United States); Rauf Mamedov (Azerbaijan); Ilya Smirin (Israel); Alexander Ipatov (Turkey); Ehsan Ghaem Maghami (Iran); Illia Nyzhnyk (Ukraine); Romain Edouard (France); Axel Bachmann (Paraguay)	7/9
Philadelphia	44	2016	**Gábor Papp** (Hungary); Gil Popilski (Israel); Aleksandr Shimanov (Russia); Viktor Bologan (Moldova); Tamaz Gelashvili (Georgia); Vasif Durarbayli (Azerbaijan); Illia Nyzhnyk (Ukraine)	7/9
Philadelphia	45	2017	**Tigran L. Petrosian** (Armenia)	7½/9
Philadelphia	46	2018	**Illia Nyzhnyk** (Ukraine)	7½/9
Philadelphia	47	2019	**Lê Quang Liêm** (Vietnam); Jeffery Xiong (United States)	7½/9
Online	48	2020	**Sanan Sjugirov** (Russia); Panneerselvam Iniyan (India)	7½/9
Philadelphia	49	2021	**Hans Niemann** (United States); John Michael Burke (United States)	7½/9
Philadelphia	50	2022	**Mikhail Antipov** (FIDE); Semen Khanin (FIDE); Jeffery Xiong (United States); Brandon Jacobson (United States); Arman Mikaelyan (Armenia); Jianchao Zhou (China); Pablo Salinas Herrera (Chile)	7/9
Philadelphia	51	2023	**Fidel Corrales Jimenez** (United States)	7½/9
Philadelphia	52	2024	**Awonder Liang** (United States)	8/9
Philadelphia	53	2025	**Bharath Subramaniyam** (India)	7½/9
Washington, D.C.	54	2026	**Xue Haowen** (China); Prraneeth Vuppala (India); Evan Park (United States)	7½/9

== Details ==
- 1973 – The 1st World Open was held from June 30 through July 4 at the Hotel McAlpin (34th Street and Broadway) in Manhattan, New York City. It had a $15,000 prize fund (1st place $2,000), a world record for an open tournament. There was an Open section and a Booster section open to players rated under 1800. It was sponsored by the Continental Chess Association and directed by Bill Goichberg, Jerry Bibuld, Bob Moran, Larry King, and Barbara Taylor. There were 369 players in the Open (44 masters) and 356 players in the Booster, for a total of 725 players. At the time, it was a new U.S. attendance record for an open (non-scholastic) tournament. GM Walter Browne, age 24, scored 9–1 (eight wins and two draws) to take first place. IM Julio Kaplan, age 23, took 2nd place with an 8½/10 score. The Booster section was won by Michael Lau, scoring 9½–½.
- 1974 – The 2nd World Open was held from July 1–7 at the Hotel McAlpin. It had a $17,000 prize fund (1st place $3,000). The total prize fund and top prize were new records for open tournaments. There were 373 players in the Open (four GMs and 48 masters) and 418 players in the Booster, for a total of 791 players, a new U.S. attendance record. GM Bent Larsen of Denmark took 1st place with eight wins and one draw (with Walter Browne), the best score ever in the tournament. GM Walter Browne took 2nd place with an 8/9 score (seven wins and two draws). The Booster section was won by Marco Silva of Columbia, scoring 8–1 (seven wins and two draws).
- 1975 – The 3rd World Open was held from July 2–6 at the Hotel Roosevelt (Madison Ave & 45th Street) in Manhattan. It had a $20,000 prize fund (1st place $3,000). There were 372 players in the Open section and 443 in the Booster section, for a total of 815 entries. GM Pal Benko (Elo 2504) and Alan Trefler (2045), age 19, tied for 1st place with an 8/9 score. Trefler's first-place finish was the biggest upset of any World Open and he is the lowest rated player to tie or win first place. He was a student of Dartmouth College and was ranked 115th in the tournament. He lost his first game, then won eight in a row. His rating after the tournament was over 2300. Benko won seven games and drew 2. Nicholas Rossolimo took 3rd place with 7½–1½, shortly before his accidental death. The Booster section was won by Eddy Vildoso with 8½/9.
- 1976 – The 4th World Open was held from July 1–5 at the Hotel Roosevelt. It had a $24,000 prize fund (a new world record for open chess tournaments), 1st place prize was $4,000. There were 362 players in the Open section (six GMs and four IMs) and 408 in the Booster section, for a total of 770 players. GM Anatoly Lein (Elo 2515) and IM Bernard Zuckerman tied for 1st with an 8–1 score. The Booster section was won by Frank Romano, with an 8–1 score.
- 1977 – The 5th World Open was held from June 30 to July 4 at the Sheraton Hotel in Philadelphia, Pennsylvania. It had a $27,000 prize fund (1st place $2,000). It now had eight sections, with 367 players in the Open section (three GMs and two IMs) and 922 players total, setting another U.S. attendance record for open tournaments. IM John Fedorowicz (2350), age 18, and IM Ron Henley (2323), age 20, tied for first with an 8–1 score.
- 1978 – The 6th World Open was held from June 30 to July 4 at the Sheraton Hotel in Philadelphia. It had a $40,000 prize fund, at the time the largest ever for an open tournament in the world. 1st place prize was $5,000. There were 1,063 entrants, a new record for open tournaments. It had seven groups, with 428 players in the Open section (six GMs and five IMs). Eight players scored 7½–1½. IM Peter Biyiasas (who was awarded the GM title later in the year) was first on tiebreak, followed by GM Florin Gheorghiu, IM Bernard Zuckerman, GM Heikki Westerinen, Yasser Seirawan, Javier Lozano Sanz, Inguar Asmundsson, and Jean Hebert. Boris Baczynskyi scored 5½–3½ (with a performance rating of 2444), becoming the first player ever to make an IM norm in an open tournament in the USA.
- 1979 – The 7th World Open was held from June 30 to July 4 at the Sheraton Hotel in Philadelphia. It had a $46,000 prize fund (1st place $5,000). It had eight sections, with 893 players total. Seven players scored 8–2 in the Open section. Haukur Angantysson of Iceland was first on tiebreak, followed by GM Tony Miles, GM Florin Gheorghiu, GM Walter Browne, GM Arthur Bisguier, IM Bernard Zuckerman, and IM John Fedorowicz.
- 1980 – The 8th World Open was held July 2–6 at the Sheraton Hotel in Philadelphia. It had a $52,000 prize fund (1st place $4,000). It had seven groups, with 776 players total. The event attracted 10 GMs and 18 IMs, with 100 players rated over 2200, a new U.S. record. Five players scored 7½–1½. GM Roman Dzindzichashvili was 1st on tiebreak, followed by Larry Christiansen, Tony Miles, Florin Gheorghiu and Lawrence Day.
- 1981 – The 9th World Open was held July 1–5 at the State University of New York at New Paltz. It had a $53,000 prize fund (1st place $5,000). It had six groups, with 702 players, the lowest number of any World Open. The Open section had 290 players, with 98 masters (five GMs and 12 IMs). Four players scored 7½–1½. IM Igor Ivanov was 1st on tiebreak, followed by FM Dmitry Gurevich, IM Joel Benjamin, and IM Michael Rohde. John Jarecki earned a master rating at this World Open, making him at the time the youngest master in American history at age 12 years and 6 months.
- 1982 – The 10th World Open was held July 2–5 at the Philadelphia Centre Hotel. It had a $55,000 prize fund (1st place $5,000). It had seven sections, with 906 players. In the Open section four players tied for 1st with a score of 7–1: Nick de Firmian, John Fedorowicz, Dmitry Gurevich and Eugene Meyer.
- 1983 – The 11th World Open was held July 1–4 at the New York Statler Hotel. It had a $57,000 prize fund (1st place $6,000). There were 1,257 players in five separate events (World Open Congress), and 840 players in the Premier tournament, with 112 masters, a new record. Four players tied for 1st with a score of 7–1. The winners, in tiebreak order, were IM Kevin Spraggett, GM Miguel Quinteros, IM Kamran Shirazi, IM Leonid Bass.
- 1984 – The 12th World Open was held from June 20 to July 4 at the Sheraton-Valley Forge Hotel in King of Prussia, Pennsylvania. It had a $60,000 prize fund (1st place $12,000). There were 500 players in this event. Four players tied for 1st with a score of 6–2. The winner, after a playoff, was Joel Benjamin, followed by Yehuda Gruenfeld, Kevin Spraggett, and Boris Kogan.
- 1985 – The 13th World Open was held July 4–7 at the Adam's Mark Hotel in Philadelphia. It had a $150,200 prize fund (1st place $15,000). There were 1,251 players in this event. Three players tied for 1st with a 7–1 score. The winner, after a playoff, was IM Maxim Dlugy, followed by GM Dmitry Gurevich and GM Yehuda Grunfeld.
- 1986 – The 14th World Open was held July 2–6 at the Adam's Mark Hotel in Philadelphia. It had a $188,500 prize fund (1st place $20,931). It had six sections with 1,506 players. The Open had 237 players, including 23 GMs, one WGM, and 29 IMs. The winner was GM Nick deFirmian with a score of 7½–1½.
- 1987 – The 15th World Open was held from June 26 to July 5 at the Adam's Mark Hotel in Philadelphia. It had a $181,000 prize fund (1st place $25,000). There were 1,293 players in this event. The Open had 99 players, including 16 GMs and 20 IMs. GM Tony Miles and GM Boris Gulko tied for 1st with a score of 8–2. Gulko won the title in a playoff.
- 1988 – The 16th World Open was held from June 26 to July 4 at the Adam's Mark Hotel in Philadelphia. It had $200,000 prize fund (1st place $25,000). The Open had only 64 players, including 17 GMs and 14 IMs. The winner was GM Maxim Dlugy with a score of 8½–2½.
- 1989 – The 17th World Open was held from June 30 to July 4 at the Adam's Mark Hotel in Philadelphia. It had a $220,000 prize fund (1st place $20,000). It had 10 sections with 1,127 players. The Open had 226 players, including 30 GMs. In the Open section, 10 players tied for 1st with a score of 7½–2½. GM Mikhail Gurevich of Russia received the title of 1989 World Open Champion, defeating GM Lev Alburt in the final of blitz (5-minute game) match. The other players were GM Alexander Chernin, GM Vladimir Epishin, GM Michael Rohde, GM John Fedorowicz, GM Walter Browne, GM Larry Christiansen, IM Alexander Ivanov and IM Gildardo Garcia of Colombia.
- 1990 – The 18th World Open was held from June 30 to July 4 at the Adam's Mark Hotel in Philadelphia. It had a $178,600 prize fund (1st place $17,870). It had five sections with 1,158 players. The Open had 212 players, including 18 GMs and 26 IMs. The winner was IM Igor Glek of the Soviet Union with a score of 7½–1½.
- 1991 – The 19th World Open was held July 1–7 at the Adam's Mark Hotel in Philadelphia. It had a $200,000 prize fund (1st place $20,000). It had five sections with over 1,200 players. four players tied for 1st with a score of 7½–1½. The winner was GM Gata Kamsky after a playoff with Semion Palatnik, IM Alex Yermolinsky, and GM Jóhann Hjartarson,
- 1992 – The 20th World Open was held from June 29 to July 5 at the Adam's Mark Hotel in Philadelphia. It had a $150,000 prize fund (1st place $12,000). It had six sections with 1,125 players. The Open section was won by GM Gregory Kaidanov with an 8–1 score.
- 1993 – The 21st World Open was held from June 29 to July 5 at the Adam's Mark Hotel in Philadelphia. It had a $150,000 prize fund (1st place $12,000). It had five sections with 1,127 players. The Open section was won by GM Alex Yermolinsky with a 7½–1½ score. A player named John Von Neumann was accused of cheating by using a computer to defeat a 2300 player and draw against GM Helgi Ólafsson. He scored 4½ points in the Open section for a prize. But after the result of two tests, demonstrating he didn't see a back-rank mate problem that any beginner could solve quickly and a casual game with a stronger player, it was decided that the player did not have sufficient knowledge of the game to achieve his 4½ points without assistance.
- 1994 – The 22nd World Open was held from June 28 to July 4 at the Adam's Mark Hotel in Philadelphia. It had a $160,000 prize fund (1st place $12,000). It had seven sections with 1,267 players (1,368 with re-entries). The Open section had 231 players with 41 GMs (32 rated over 2600) and 17 IMs. Artashes Minasian and Loek Van Wely both scored 7½–1½. Minasian won the event after a playoff.
- 1995 – The 23rd World Open was held from June 28 to July 4 at the Adam's Mark Hotel in Philadelphia. It had a $160,000 prize fund (1st place $12,000), with seven sections and 1,482 players. The Open section had 234 players with 27 GMs and 11 IMs. It was won by GM Alex Yermolinsky with an 8–1 score. GM Gregory Kaidanov placed second with a 7½–1½ score.
- 1996 – The 24th World Open was held from June 29 to July 7 at the Adam's Mark Hotel in Philadelphia. It had a $180,000 prize fund (1st place $15,000), with 1,407 players in nine sections. The Open section had 165 masters, including 19 GMs and 11 IMs. It was by GM Alex Yermolinsky after a playoff with GM Alexander Goldin. Both scored 7½–1½.
- 1997 – The 25th World Open was held from June 28 to July 6 at the Adam's Mark Hotel in Philadelphia. It had a $180,000 prize fund (1st place $14,000). It had nine sections. The Open section had 227 players, including 22 GMs. It was won by GM Alex Shabalov with an 8–1 score, 2nd place going to Sergey Kudrin with a 7½–1½ score. The biggest upset came when Chris Theuerl, rated only 974, defeated Life Master Richard Noel, rated 2222.
- 1998 – The 26th World Open was held from June 27 to July 5 at the Adam's Mark Hotel in Philadelphia. It had a $190,000 prize fund (1st place $14,000). It had seven sections with 1,335 players. The Open section was won by GM Alexander Goldin with an 8½–½ score. Ilya Smirin placed 2nd with a 7½–1½ score.
- 1999 – The 27th World Open was held from June 26 to July 5 at the Adam's Mark Hotel in Philadelphia. It had a $200,000 prize fund (1st place $15,000), with 1,470 players in seven sections . The Open section had 228 players, including 30 GMs. Tied for 1st with a 7–2 score were Gregory Serper, Boris Gulko, Alex Yermolinsky, Joel Benjamin, Vladimir Akopian, Jaan Ehlvest, Igor Novikov, Georgy Timoshenko, Alexander Shabalov, and Alexander Fishbein. Gregory Serper won the playoff securing first place.
- 2000 – The 28th World Open was held from June 28 to July 4 at the Adam's Mark Hotel in Philadelphia. It had a $200,000 prize fund (1st place $15,000). It had eight sections with 1,235 players. The Open section had 175 players, including 23 GMs. Tied for 1st were Joel Benjamin (who won in a blitz playoff), Jaan Ehlvest, Sergey Kudrin, Gregory Serper, Alexander Ivanov, Pavel Blatny, John Fedorowicz, and Alexander Goldin, with a 7–2 score.
- 2001 – The 29th World Open was held from June 30 to July 8 at the Adam's Mark Hotel in Philadelphia. It had a $175,000 prize fund (1st place $14,000). There were eight sections with 1,302 players. Seven players tied for 1st with a 7–2 score: Alexander Goldin (winner in a playoff), Ilya Smirin, Alexander Onischuk, Leonid Yudasin, Yuri Shulman, Joel Benjamin, and Alexander Ivanov.
- 2002 – The 30th World Open was held from June 29 to July 7 at the Adam's Mark Hotel in Philadelphia. It had a $175,000 prize fund (1st place $14,000). It had eight sections with 1,300 players. The Open section had 216 players, including 26 GMs. Nine players tied for 1st with a 7–2 score. They were 18-year-old Polish IM Kamil Milton (winner in a playoff), Ilya Smirin, Alexander Onischuk, Artur Yusupov, Jaan Ehlvest, Aleks Wojtkiewicz, Benjamin Finegold, Jonathan Rowson, and Varuzhan Akobian.
- 2003 – The 31st World Open was held from June 28 to July 6 at the Adam's Mark Hotel in Philadelphia. It had a $180,000 prize fund (1st place $14,000). It had eight sections with 1,413 players. The Open section had 238 players, including 35 grandmasters and 180 masters. Ten players tied for 1st with a 7–2 score. They were Jaan Ehlvest (playoff winner), Ilya Smirin, Alexander Onischuk, Alexander Shabalov, Aleks Wojtkiewicz, Nazar Firman, Alexander Goldin, Gennadi Zaitshik, Babakouly Annakov, and Leonid Yudasin.
- 2004 – The 32nd World Open has held from June 26 to July 5 at the Adam's Mark Hotel in Philadelphia. It had a $180,000 prize fund (1st place $14,000). It had eight sections with 1,208 players. The Open section had 223 players, including 36 grandmasters and three woman grandmasters. The Open section was won by Varuzhan Akobian with a 7½–1½ score.
- 2005 – The 33rd World Open was held from June 28 to July 4 at the Wyndham Philadelphia Hotel. It had a $180,000 prize fund (1st place $14,000). It had eight sections with 1,095 players. Kamil Mitoń and Magesh Panchanathan tied for 1st with a 7½–1½ score. Mitoń won the playoff.
- 2006 – The 34th World Open was held from June 28 to July 4 at the Sheraton in Philadelphia. It had a $358,000 prize fund (1st place $18,000). It had eight sections with over 1,400 players. The Open section had 237 players. Nine players tied for 1st in the Open section with a 7–2 score. They were Gata Kamsky (playoff winner), Vadim Milov, Ildar Ibragimov, Jaan Ehlvest, Leonid Yudasin, Alexander Ivanov, Giorgi Kacheishvili, Joel Benjamin, and Aleks Wojtkiewicz.
- 2007 – The 35th World Open was held from June 28 to July 4 at the Valley Forge Pennsylvania Radisson and Convention Plaza. It had a $280,000 prize fund (1st place $15,000). It had nine sections. The Open section had 92 players. Nine players tied for 1st in the Open section with a 6½–2½ score. They were Varuzhan Akobian (playoff winner), Hikaru Nakamura, Sandipan Chanda, Leonid Yudasin, Evgeny Najer, Alexander Stripunsky, Victor Mikhalevski, and Julio Becerra.
- 2008 – The 36th World Open was held from June 30 to July 6 at the Sheraton in Philadelphia. It had a $320,000 prize fund (1st place $30,000). It had 11 sections with over 1,200 players. The Open section had 118 players. Four players tied for 1st in the Open section with a 7–2 score. They were Evgeny Najer (playoff winner), Parimarjan Negi, Alexander Moiseenko, and Ľubomír Ftáčnik.
- 2009 – The 37th World Open was held from June 29 to July 5 at the Sheraton Philadelphia City Center Hotel. It had a total prize fund of $250,000 (1st place $15,200, equal first $15,000). There were 1350 players in nine sections. In the top section Hikaru Nakamura and Evgeny Najer finished first with 7/9. They had to play an Armaggedon game for tiebreak, but Nakamura had to leave and did not play, so Najer secured first place. Two players, IM Alex Lenderman and IM Leonid Gerzhoy, made a GM norm. Alex Lenderman's was his third GM norm. FMs Bindi Cheng and Michael Lee made an IM norm.
- 2010 – The 38th World Open was held from June 29 to July 5 at the Valley Forge Convention Plaza in Pennsylvania. It had a prize fund of $250,000 ($17,413 for 1st place). There were nearly 1,200 players in 10 sections. The Open section had 119 players, including 35 grandmasters. Czech GM Viktor Láznička took first place with 7½/9.
- 2020 – The 48th World Open was held online on the Internet Chess Club from August 7-9, 2020 with a time control of G/60; +10. It had a prize fund of $20,000 ($4,000 for 1st place). There were 908 players in 4 sections, including 122 players in the Open Section.
