= Haukur Angantýsson =

Icelandic chess player (1948–2012)

Personal information
- Born: 2 December 1948 Flateyri, Önundarfjörður
- Died: 4 May 2012 (aged 63)

Chess career
- Country: Iceland
- Title: International Master (1981)
- Peak rating: 2425 (January 1980)

Haukur Angantýsson (2 December 1948 – 4 May 2012) was an Icelandic chess International Master.

He was awarded the International Master title by FIDE in 1981.

Haukur won the Icelandic Chess Championship in 1976.

Graduating from Reykjavík High School in 1968, Haukur completed his studies in chemistry from Georg August Universität in Göttingen, Germany, in 1973. He took a ship's captain's certificate from Reykjavík Naval Academy in 1975.

Haukur worked in various and very diverse jobs throughout his life, including research in the fields of chemistry, teaching, seafaring, both domestically and abroad, and net making.

His greatest chess success was his victory in the 1979 World Open at Philadelphia with 8 points out of 10 games, after a tie-break with six other players, four of whom were grandmasters: Tony Miles, Florin Gheorghiu, Walter Browne, Arthur Bisguier, Bernard Zuckerman and John Fedorowicz.
