= Political authority =

Authority related to political life

In political philosophy and ethics, political authority refers to the right of an individual or a group to command or govern a state. Political authority grants members of a government the right to rule over citizens using coercion if necessary (i.e., political legitimacy), while imposing an obligation on citizens to obey government orders (i.e., political obligation).

Philosophers commonly distinguish between de facto and de jure political authority: de facto refers to the government's effectiveness in compelling obedience, and de jure concerns whether that capacity to use force is morally justified, and under what conditions it creates a duty to obey the authority's command.

A central question in political philosophy is "To what extent is political authority legitimate?" Views range from political authority having no legitimacy (philosophical anarchism) to political authority being virtually unlimited in scope (totalitarianism), with most theorists having positions between these two extremes.

== Justifications ==
=== Consent and social contract ===
In addition to the divine right to rule, the oldest justification for political authority is consent, actual or hypothetical, of the governed. Thomas Hobbes argued in the Leviathan that individuals in a state of nature would rationally consent to transfer some of their rights to a sovereign for protection from a life that is "solitary, poor, nasty, brutish, and short". John Locke, in the Second Treatise of Government, grounded legitimate government in the consent of the governed. However, Locke argued that this consent is conditional on the government's protection of pre-political natural rights to life, liberty, and property. Jean-Jacques Rousseau theorized legitimate authority emanating from the "general will", formed when a political community binds itself to the laws it collectively authors. The consent and social contract theories have been criticized on the grounds that the citizens have never consented to the government in any meaningful sense. A hypothetical or tacit consent cannot create an obligation to obey the sovereign.

=== Fair play ===
British legal philosopher H. L. A. Hart grounded political obligation in the principle of fair play, stating that those who knowingly accept and benefit from mutually beneficial cooperation, such as public goods provided by the government, have an obligation to bear their fair share of its burden, including obedience to the state. The concept was later developed further by John Rawls.

=== Natural duty of justice ===
In addition to fair play, Rawls proposed a natural duty to support and comply with just institutions, regardless of consent or acceptance of benefits, making the obligation emanating from living under just institutions.

=== Service conception of authority ===
Joseph Raz proposed an alternative view that does not ground in consent, fairness, or general duties. In Raz's "service conception", authority is justified to the extent that the subjects would better confirm to the reason that already apply to them by following the authority's directions than by acting on their own independent judgment. Thus, a legitimate authority's directives function as pre-emptive reasons that replace the reasons subjects would otherwise weigh for themselves.

=== Democratic authority ===
Thomas Christiano has argued that democratic decision-making is uniquely suited to treating citizens as equals under conditions of persistent disagreement about justice and the common good, and that this equal standing is itself enough to justify obedience to a democratically enacted law, at least in certain limits.

==== Associative and communitarian obligation ====
Ronald Dworkin and several other communitarian theorists have grounded political obligation in the membership in a political community, similar to the special obligation that arises from family or other non-voluntary associative membership of a group. However, this view has been criticized mere membership to a political community does not create moral obligations to obey political authority, particularly for individuals who did not choose that membership and may reject the community's values.

== Challenges to political authority ==
=== Philosophical anarchism ===
Philosophical anarchism holds that no existing state possesses genuine political authority, without necessarily endorsing political action to abolish the state. Robert Paul Wolff. in In Defense of Anarchism, has argued that individual moral autonomy is incompatible with the concept of legitimate authority, which requires subjects to obey simply because they have been commanded, concluding that de jure legitimate authority is conceptually impossible.
