= Leonid Yudasin =

Israeli chess grandmaster (born 1959)

Personal information
- Native name: ליאוניד יודסין
- Born: Leonid Grigoryevich Yudasin; August 8, 1959 (age 67) Leningrad, Russian SFSR, Soviet Union

Chess career
- Country: Soviet Union (until 1991); Israel (since 1992)
- Title: Grandmaster (1990)
- Peak rating: 2645 (January 1991)
- Peak ranking: No. 8 (January 1991)

Leonid Yudasin (Hebrew: ליאוניד גריגורייביץ' יודסין; Russian: Леонид Григорьевич Юдасин, romanized: Leonid Grigoryevich Yudasin; born August 8, 1959) is a Soviet-born Israeli chess player and trainer. He was awarded the title of Grandmaster by FIDE in 1990. Yudasin was part of the USSR team that won the gold medal in the 1990 Chess Olympiad. He competed in the Candidates Tournament for the World Chess Championship twice, in 1991 and 1994.

== Career ==
Yudasin was awarded the title of International Master in 1982, and in 1984 he became the champion of Leningrad, his native city. He went on to gain the USSR Cup for rapid chess in 1988.

Yudasin became a joint winner of the 1990 USSR Championship (with Alexander Beliavsky, Evgeny Bareev and Alexey Vyzmanavin, the title going to Beliavsky on tie-break). He added individual bronze and team gold medals the same year, at the Chess Olympiad in Novi Sad, when he represented the USSR and registered the best performance of any of his teammates. He also achieved the title of Grandmaster in 1990. In 1994 and again in 1996, he played under the Israeli flag at the Moscow and Yerevan Olympiads, respectively.

A World Championship candidate in 1991 (ranked then at No. 8 in the world), he qualified again in 1994 and this time progressed to the latter stages, losing out to Vladimir Kramnik in the quarterfinals by a score of 2½-4½.

His best international tournament success occurred at León in 1993, where he won ahead of Alexey Vyzmanavin, Veselin Topalov, Anatoly Karpov and a young Peter Leko. Yudasin's tournament record includes victories at Leningrad 1989, Calcutta 1990, Pamplona 1990/91 (also 1991/92, jointly with Miguel Illescas), Dos Hermanas 1992, Botvinnik Memorial 1995, Haifa Super Tournament 1996 and St. Petersburg White Knights 1998. At Reggio Emilia, he was a joint winner with Dimitri Komarov in 1997/1998 (conceding the title on tie-break) and was the outright winner in 1999/2000. In 2002, Yudasin tied for first place at the U.S. Masters Chess Championship.

Yudasin lived in Israel for many years and was twice the Israeli champion, in Tel-Aviv 1994 and Jerusalem 1996. He has won tournaments all over the US and took second place at the US Open 1990 and Pennsylvania World Open 2001. Since 2002, he has spent most of his time in New York, dominating the weekly Masters' tournament (top money winner), along with the likes of Hikaru Nakamura, Jaan Ehlvest, and the late Aleksander Wojtkiewicz. In 2004, he won a strong tournament in Montreal, Canada.

He is also a coach and director of the Brooklyn Chess Academy. His former students include Varuzhan Akobian, Irina Krush, Jennifer Shahade, and the late Lembit Oll.

== Personal life ==
Leonid Yudasin is a practicing Orthodox Jew, living in Brooklyn, New York.

== See also ==
- List of Jewish chess players
