= Alex Yermolinsky =

American chess grandmaster (born 1958)

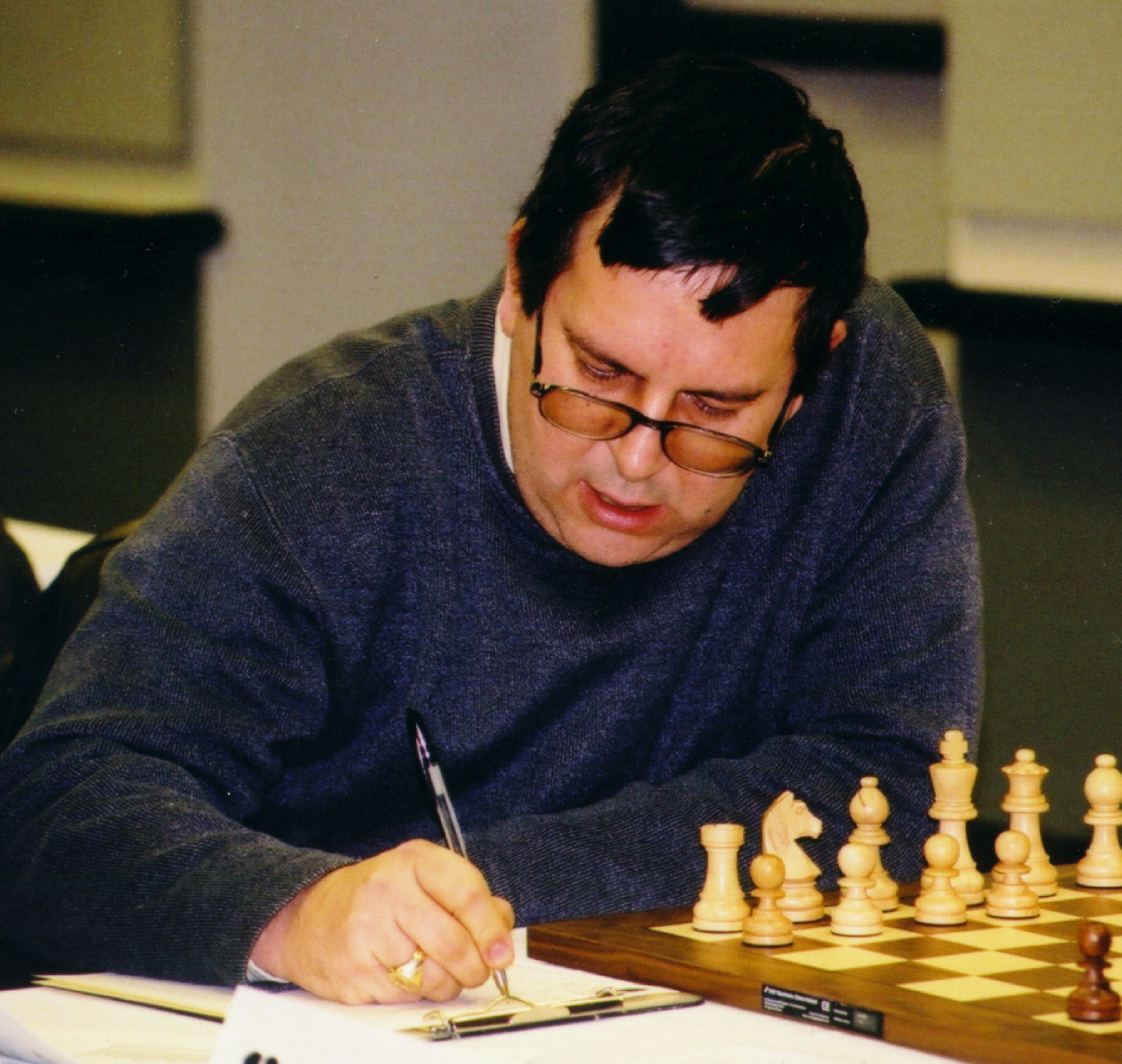
- Yermolinsky at the 2003 U.S. Championships in Seattle, Washington

Personal information
- Born: April 11, 1958 (age 68) Leningrad, Russian SFSR, Soviet Union
- Spouse: Camilla Baginskaite

Chess career
- Country: Soviet Union (until 1991); United States (since 1991)
- Title: Grandmaster (1992)
- Peak rating: 2660 (January 1998)
- Peak ranking: No. 21 (January 1998)

Alex Yermolinsky (Russian: Алексей Ермолинский, romanized: Alexey Yermolinskiy; born April 11, 1958) is an American chess player. Awarded the title of Grandmaster by FIDE in 1992, he is a two-time U.S. champion.

== Career ==
Yermolinsky tied for first with Vladislav Vorotnikov in the Leningrad City Chess Championship in 1985. In 1993, Yermolinsky won the U.S. Chess Championship, tying for first place with Alexander Shabalov. In 1996 he was the sole champion. He won the World Open in Philadelphia three times: in 1993, 1995 and 1996; in 1999 he shared first with nine other players, but Gregory Serper won the playoff. In 2001 he won the American Continental Championship in Cali, Colombia.

In 2012 Yermolinsky was inducted into the US Chess Hall of Fame.

He is a regular commentator and presenter on the Internet Chess Club.

== Books ==
- Yermolinsky, Alex (2000). Road to Chess Improvement. Gambit Publications. ISBN 1-901983-24-2.
- Yermolinsky, Alex (2006). Chess Explained: The Classical Sicilian. Gambit Publications. ISBN 1-904600-42-5.

Preceded by Patrick Wolff	United States Chess Champion; 1993 (with Alexander Shabalov)	Succeeded by Boris Gulko
Preceded by Nick de Firmian, Patrick Wolff, and Alexander Ivanov	United States Chess Champion; 1996	Succeeded by Joel Benjamin
