= Cynthia Griffin Wolff =

American literary historian (1936–2024)

- Born: Cynthia Griffin; August 20, 1936; St. Louis, Missouri, U.S.
- Died: July 25, 2024 (aged 87)
- Occupation: Literary historian
- Spouse: Robert Paul Wolff
- Children: Patrick Wolff and Tobias Barrington Wolff

Academic background
- Education: Harvard University
- Thesis: The Puritan Sources of Richardson's Psychological Realism (1965 or 1966)

Cynthia Griffin Wolff (née Griffin; August 20, 1936 – July 25, 2024) was an American literary historian and editor known for her biographies of Edith Wharton and Emily Dickinson. She was the Class of 1922 Professor of Humanities at the Massachusetts Institute of Technology.

== Biography ==
Cynthia Griffin Wolff was born on August 20, 1936, in St. Louis, Missouri. She was the daughter of Eunice (née Heyn) and Sears executive James T. Griffin. She studied at Hathaway Brown School and Radcliffe College (where she obtained a BA in 1958). Wolff later moved to Harvard University, where, in addition to studying at Harvard Medical School, she obtained a PhD in English in 1965; her dissertation was titled The Puritan Sources of Richardson's Psychological Realism. (Note: Sources differ over the year of her PhD. Although both her International Who's Who of Authors and Writers and Penguin Random House biographies date it to 1965, Harvard Library's HOLLIS database dates it to 1966.)

Wolff worked as an assistant professor at Manhattanville College and later at University of Massachusetts, Amherst, before being promoted by the latter to professor in 1976. While working at UM Amherst, she published two books: Samuel Richardson (1972) and A Feast of Words: The Triumph of Edith Wharton (1977). She eventually received tenure at UM Amherst.

In 1980, Wolff moved to the Massachusetts Institute of Technology, where she became Class of 1922 Professor of Humanities in 1985. In 1984, Wolff received an American Council of Learned Societies Grant-In-Aid for a project called "The life of Emily Dickinson". In 1986, Wolff published Emily Dickinson, a biography of Emily Dickinson. Wolff worked on a third biography, focusing on Willa Cather, but it was abandoned and remained unpublished at the time of her death.

In 1997, she was awarded a Guggenheim Fellowship. Wolff retired in 2003.

Wolff also edited at least four books: Other Lives (1973), Classic American Women Writers (1980), The House of Mirth (1985), and Four Stories by American Women (1990).

Wolff was married twice. Her first marriage, to political philosopher Robert Paul Wolff, lasted from 1962 until their divorce in 1986. She married Nicholas J. White in 1988; the couple divorced in 2019. She had two children from her first marriage, chess grandmaster Patrick Wolff and legal scholar and LGBT activist Tobias Barrington Wolff. During her later life, she lived in a Cape Cod house in South Dennis, Massachusetts, and later in Orchard Cove, a senior community in Canton, Massachusetts.

Wolff died on July 25, 2024, at the age of 87.

== Bibliography ==
- Samuel Richardson and the Eighteenth-Century Puritan Character (1972)
- A Feast of Words: The Triumph of Edith Wharton (1977)
- Emily Dickinson (1986)

=== As editor ===
- Other Lives (1973)
- Classic American Women Writers (1980)
- The House of Mirth (1985, by Edith Wharton)
- Four Stories by American Women (1990)
