= Anatoly Lein =

Soviet-American chess grandmaster (1931–2018)

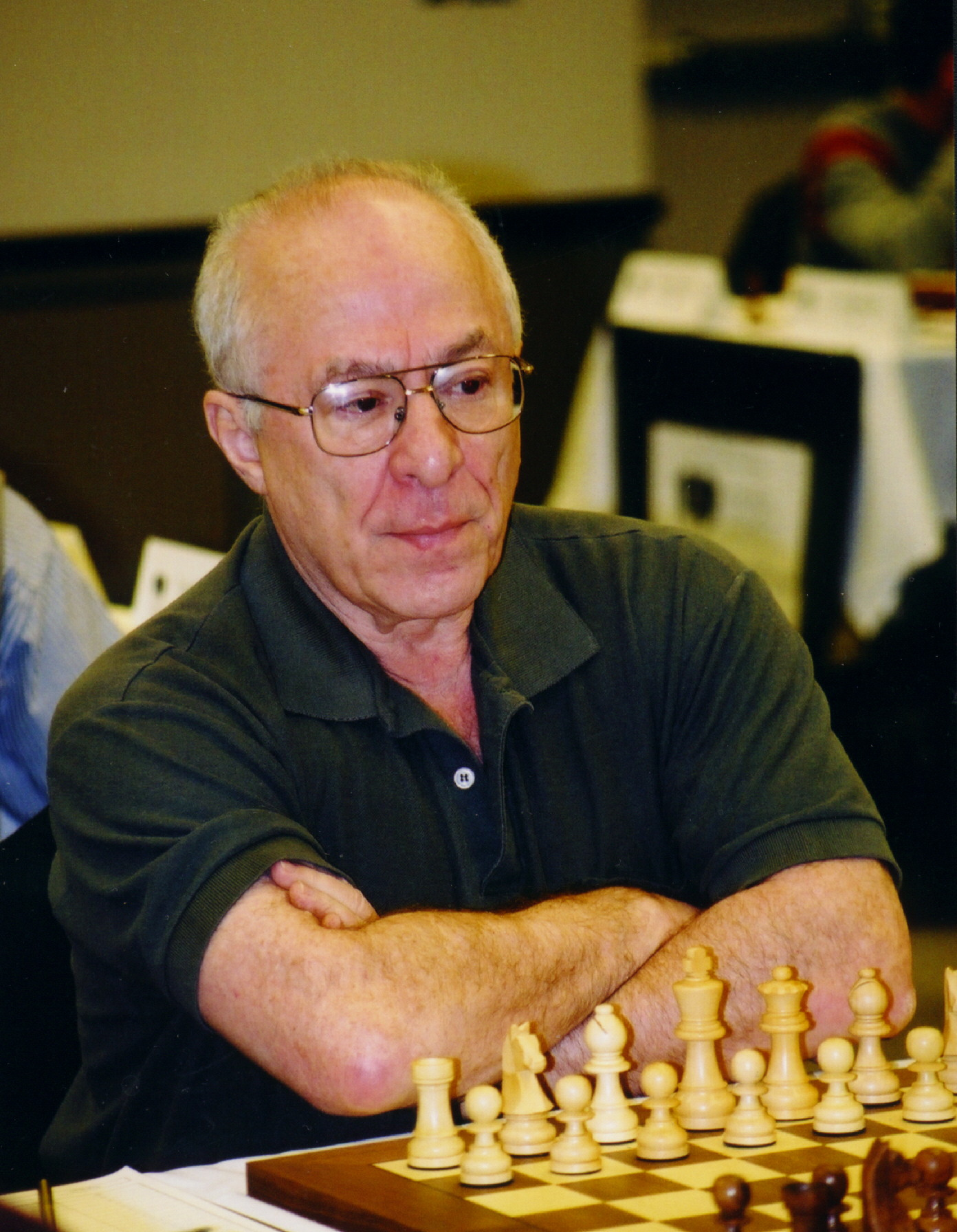
- Lein at the 2003 U.S. Chess Championships in Seattle

Personal information
- Born: Anatoly Yakovlevich Lein; March 28, 1931 Leningrad, USSR
- Died: March 1, 2018 (aged 86) Beachwood, Ohio, US

Chess career
- Country: Soviet Union (before 1977); United States (after 1977)
- Title: Grandmaster (1968)
- Peak rating: 2545 (July 1973)
- Peak ranking: No. 38 (July 1973)

Anatoly Yakovlevich Lein (Russian: Анатолий Яковлевич Лейн; March 28, 1931 – March 1, 2018) was a Soviet-born American chess player. He was awarded the title of Grandmaster by FIDE in 1968.

== Chess career ==
FIDE awarded Lein the International Master title in 1964 and the Grandmaster title in 1968.

Lein finished equal first at Moscow 1970, and won the 1971 Moscow championship after a play-off. He placed first at Cienfuegos 1972, first at Novi Sad 1972 and 1973, and equal first at Grand Manan 1984.

In 1976 Lein emigrated to the United States, finishing equal first with Leonid Shamkovich in the U.S. Open, and equal first with Bernard Zuckerman in the World Open that year. He also played on the U.S. team in the 1978 Chess Olympiad.

Lein was New Jersey champion from 1992 through 1994. In 2005 he was inducted into the World Chess Hall of Fame in Miami. He resided in a suburb of Cleveland, Ohio, until his death in 2018.

Among his notable victims were two world champions, Mikhail Tal and Vassily Smyslov. Lein also scored wins against such world class grandmasters as David Bronstein, Lev Polugaevsky, Leonid Stein, and Mark Taimanov.

A tribute to Lein by Internet Chess Club (ICC), in the form of a video, was presented by Joel Benjamin on March 5, 2018.

== Notable games ==
- Ujtumen vs. Lein, Sochi 1965
  1.e4 e5 2.Nf3 Nc6 3.Bb5 Nd4 4.Nxd4 exd4 5.0-0 c6 6.Bc4 Nf6 7.Re1 d6 8.c3 Ng4 9.h3 Ne5 10.Bf1 d3 11.f4 Qb6+ 12.Kh1 h5 13.fxe5 Bg4 14.Qb3 Qf2 15.Qxb7 Rd8 16.Rd1 Bxd1 17.Qxc6+ Ke7 18.Qc7+ Rd7 19.exd6+ Kf6 20.e5+ Kxe5 21.Qxd7 Qxf1+ 22.Kh2 Bxd6 23.c4 Qf4+ 24.Kh1 Kf6 0–1
- Ashley vs. Lein, New York Open 1989
  1.c4 e5 2.Nc3 Nf6 3.Nf3 Nc6 4.e4 d6 5.h3 g6 6.g3 Bg7 7.Bg2 0-0 8.0-0 Nd7 9.d3 Nc5 10.Be3 Ne6 11.Rb1 a5 12.Qd2 Ncd4 13.Ne2 Nxe2+ 14.Qxe2 f5 15.exf5 gxf5 16.Bd2 Bd7 17.Bc3 Bc6 18.Rbd1 Qf6 19.Rfe1 Rae8 20.b3 f4 21.g4 h5 22.gxh5 Qf7 23.Ba1 Qxh5 24.Kh2 Ng5 25.Nxg5 f3! 26.Nxf3 Bxf3 27.Qf1 Bh6 28.Bxf3 Rxf3 29.Qg2+ Kf7 30.Qg4 Rxh3+! 31.Qxh3 Bf4+ 32.Kg2 Rg8+ 33.Qg3 Rxg3+ 34.fxg3 Qg4 0–1
- Lein vs. Benjamin, U.S. Championship, 1986
  1.d4 Nf6 2.Nf3 e6 3.c4 b6 4.Nc3 Bb4 5.Bg5 h6 6.Bh4 Bxc3+ 7.bxc3 Bb7 8.Nd2 d6 9.f3 Nbd7 10.e4 g5 11.Bf2 Nh5 12.g3 f5 13.Bd3 Qf6 14.Qe2 0-0 15.h4 Ng7 16.Rh2 c5 17.hxg5 Qxg5 18.Rh3 cxd4 19.cxd4 fxe4 20.Nxe4 Qa5+ 21.Kf1 h5 22.Kg1 d5 23.cxd5 Qxd5 24.Rf1 Nf6 25.Rh4 Rac8 26.Rf4 Nxe4 27.fxe4 Qd6 28.Be3 Rxf4 29.Rxf4 Rc3 30.Bc4 b5 31.Bb3 a5 32.Qd2 Qb4 33.d5 a4 34.d6 axb3 35.d7 b2 36.d8=Q+ Kh7 37.Rf7 b1=Q+ 38.Kf2 Q1xe4 39.Rxg7+ Kxg7 40.Q2d7+ 1–0

== See also ==
- List of Jewish chess players
