= Alexander Ivanov (chess player) =

Soviet-American chess grandmaster (born 1956)

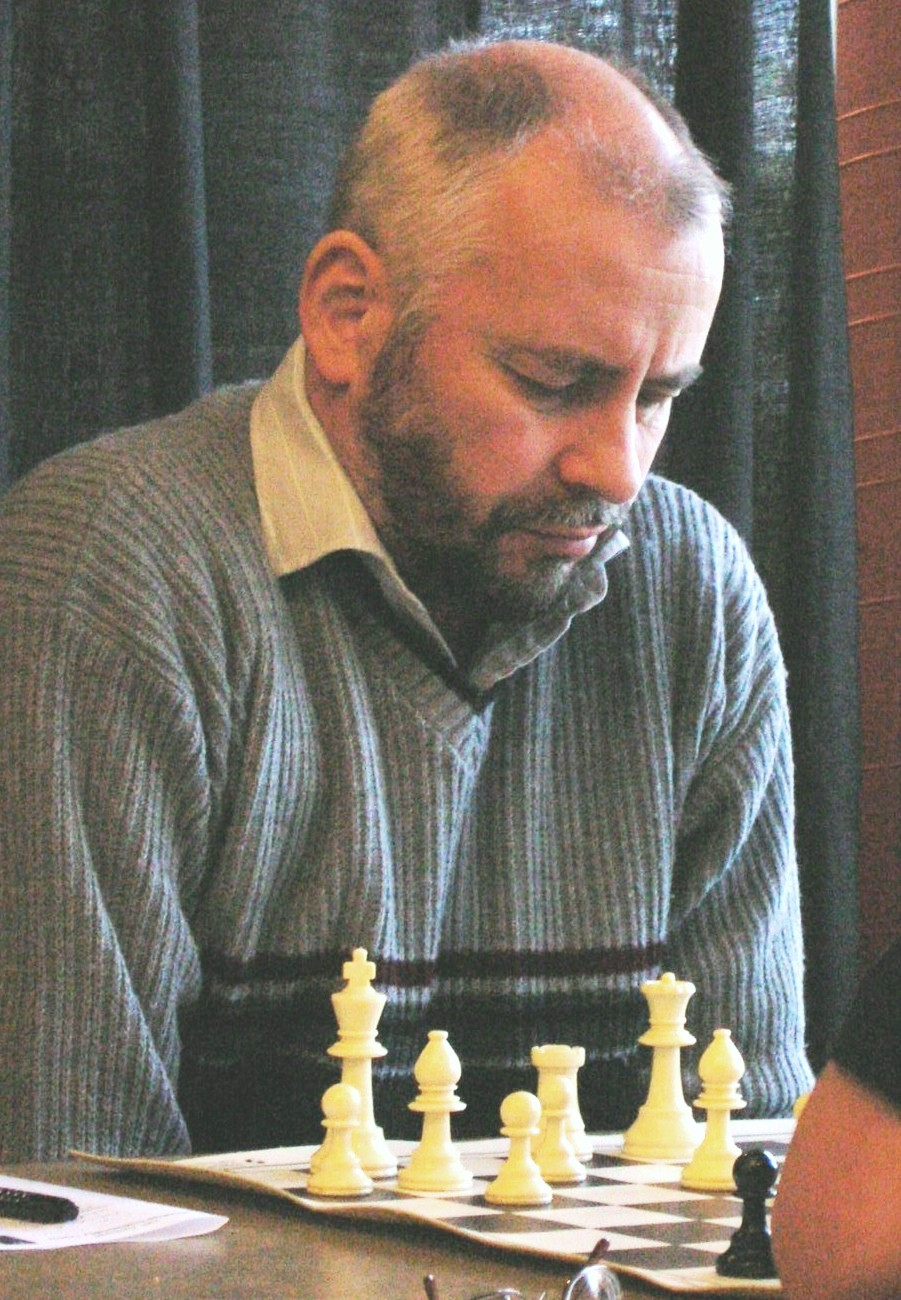

Personal information
- Born: May 1, 1956 (age 70) Omsk, Russian SFSR, Soviet Union
- Spouse: Esther Epstein

Chess career
- Country: Soviet Union (until 1988); United States (since 1988)
- Title: Grandmaster (1991)
- FIDE rating: 2384 (February 2026)
- Peak rating: 2606 (January 2006)

Alexander Vladimirovich Ivanov (Russian: Александр Владимирович Иванов; born May 1, 1956) is a Soviet-born American chess grandmaster. Born in Omsk, present-day Russia, he moved to the United States in 1988. FIDE awarded him his grandmaster title in 1991. He lives in Massachusetts with his wife, fellow chess player and Woman International Master Esther Epstein.

Ivanov has competed in four FIDE World Championships (1999, 2000, 2002 and 2004) and four FIDE World Cups (2005, 2007, 2009 and 2011).

Ivanov played twice on the Soviet team in the World U26 Team Championship, winning the team silver medal in 1978 and an individual gold and team gold in 1980. He then played for the US team in the 2002 Chess Olympiad.

Ivanov has won the USCF Grand Prix four times (1991, 1993, 1994, and 1996).

== Notable victories ==
In 1988, Ivanov won against Deep Thought in Pittsburgh, Pennsylvania.

In 2011, Ivanov defeated Varuzhan Akobian and Daniel Naroditsky in the US Championship.

== Notable placings ==
Ivanov placed second at the 1980 Young Masters Championship of the USSR. He shared first place in the 1989 World Open chess tournament. He was joint US champion in 1995 (with Nick de Firmian and Patrick Wolff), and Pan American champion in 1998. In 2007 he tied for first place with Julio Granda, Varuzhan Akobian, Darcy Lima and Eduardo Iturrizaga in the American Continental Championship in Cali. He also won the 135th Annual New York State Championship in 2013, winning $1,500.

Achievements
Preceded by Boris Gulko	United States Chess Champion; 1995 (with Nick de Firmian and Patrick Wolff)	Succeeded by Alex Yermolinsky
