= Viktor Láznička =

Czech chess grandmaster (born 1988)

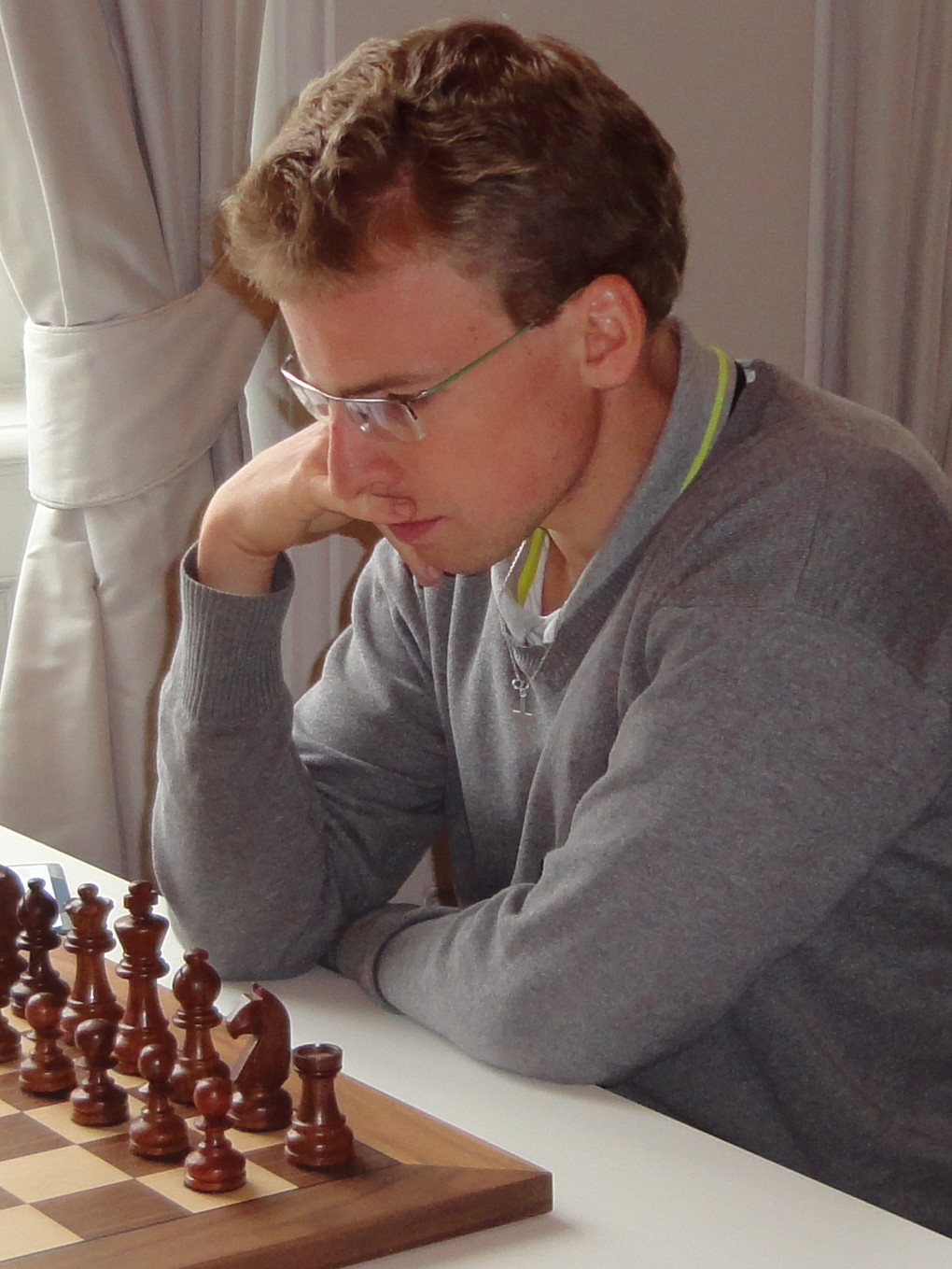
- Láznička in 2016

Personal information
- Born: January 9, 1988 (age 38) Pardubice, Czech Republic

Chess career
- Country: Czech Republic
- Title: Grandmaster (2006)
- FIDE rating: 2585 (July 2026)
- Peak rating: 2704 (January 2012)
- Peak ranking: No. 40 (January 2012)

Viktor Láznička (born January 9, 1988, in Pardubice) is a Czech chess grandmaster.

== Chess beginnings ==
After learning the game at age six, he progressed quickly to playing junior tournaments and achieved many prize-winning performances in the national championships across the range of age limits. These included wins in the under-10 category (1997) and the under-12 category (1998 and 1999). He also finished second in the under-18 event in 2001.

At the European Youth Chess Championship, held in Herceg Novi in 2005, he was a bronze-medallist in the under-18 category.

Upon leaving school, he enrolled at the Charles University, Prague, to study Business Administration.

== Results in international competitions ==
In the early part of Láznička's tournament career, he was a joint winner at Olomouc in 2002 and at Mariánské Lázně in 2003. He was successful in Brno in both 2005 and 2006, the latter when he won the full national Czech Championship. This was also the year that he qualified as a grandmaster and commenced his Olympiad career, scoring the best individual result of the Czech team in Turin.

In 2007, he was joint winner of the Czech Open (with Vlastimil Babula), held in his home town. He qualified for the Chess World Cup 2007, but was eliminated in the first round by strong Polish player Bartłomiej Macieja.

In 2008, he shared victory with Krishnan Sasikiran at Calcutta and was declared winner on tie-break. He then took a share of second place at the EU Individual Open Chess Championship in Liverpool, behind Jan Werle (and equal with the highly rated Michael Adams and Nigel Short).

In December 2009, he tied for 1st-4th with Georg Meier, Julio Granda and Kiril Georgiev in the 19th Magistral Pamplona Tournament.

In June 2010, he won the City of Good Wine Rapid tournament in Hustopeče. In July 2010, he took clear first place at the World Open Chess Tournament with 7½/9. In August 2010, Láznička won convincingly the prestigious invitation Gyorgy Marx Memorial tournament with 8/10.

Between 2006 and 2014 he participated in the Chess olympiad with the Czech team five times.

In 2019, he reached 2nd place in the Czech Blitz Championship with a score of 13/15.

Láznička has had several coaches during his chess career, but most recently has been tutored by Sergei Movsesian, a high-ranking Slovak player and one of his teammates in the Czech league.

As of September 2023, he is the Czech Republic's third highest-rated player.
