= Saptarshi Roy Chowdhury =

Indian chess grandmaster (born 1982)

Personal information
- Born: 13 February 1982 (age 44) Kolkata, India

Chess career
- Country: India
- Title: Grandmaster (2013)
- Peak rating: 2500 (June 2013)

Saptarshi Roy Chowdhury is an Indian chess grandmaster.

== Career ==
In April 2010, Saptarshi tied for 3rd–6th with Vladimir Malaniuk, David Smerdon, and Magesh Chandran Panchanathan in the Doeberl Cup in Canberra.

In May 2023, Saptarshi tied for first place with Neelash Saha, Kushagra Mohan, and Chakravarthi Reddy M in the Late Bharatbai Halkude Memorial Chess Festival 7th Rating Open. He lost the win to Neelash after tiebreaks, but remained undefeated throughout the event.

In December 2023, Saptarshi was a joint leader after the second round of the 1st Marvel All India Open. He remained undefeated and ultimately finished in second place with a score of 7.5/9, behind winner Bharat Kumar Reddy Poluri.
