= Emily Dickinson (book) =

1986 book by Cynthia Griffin Wolff

- Author: Cynthia Griffin Wolff
- Language: English
- Subject: Emily Dickinson
- Genre: Biography
- Publication date: 1986

Emily Dickinson is a 1986 biography book by Cynthia Griffin Wolff on the poet of the same name.
