= Tobias Barrington Wolff =

American law professor

Tobias Barrington Wolff (born 1970) is a professor of law at the University of Pennsylvania Law School where he teaches classes on sexuality and the law, same sex marriage and human rights. He is known for his legal advocacy on same sex marriage and other LGBTQ-related issues, and served as the chief advisor and spokesperson on LGBTQ issues for Barack Obama throughout his 2007-08 presidential campaign. He is openly gay.

== Biography ==
Wolff was educated at Yale University (BA 1992) and Yale Law School (JD 1997), where he transferred after his first year. At Yale, he wrote for the Yale Law Journal. After clerking for Ninth Circuit Federal Appeals Court judges William Albert Norris and Betty Fletcher, Wolff spent two years as an associate at Paul, Weiss before beginning his academic legal career. He has taught at UC Davis, Stanford, and Northwestern Law Schools. He is currently professor of law at the University of Pennsylvania.

Wolff is the youngest son of the philosopher Robert Paul Wolff and literary historian Cynthia Griffin Wolff. His brother is chess grandmaster Patrick Wolff.

== Bibliography ==
- Wolff, Tobias B. (2008). "Federal Jurisdiction and Due Process in the Era of the Nationwide Class Action". University of Pennsylvania Law Review. 156: 2035.
- Wolff, Tobias B. (2005). "Preclusion in Class Action Litigation". Columbia Law Review. 105: 717.
- Wolff, Tobias B. (2004). "Political Representation and Accountability Under Don't Ask Don't Tell". Iowa Law Review. 89: 1633.
- Silberman, Linda; Allen Stein; Tobias Wolff (2009). Civil Procedure: Theory and Practice (3rd ed.). Aspen.
