= Alexander Goldin =

American chess grandmaster (born 1964)

Personal information
- Born: February 27, 1964 (age 62)

Chess career
- Country: Soviet Union → Russia (before 1998); Israel (1998–2001); United States (after 2001)
- Title: Grandmaster (1989)
- FIDE rating: 2514 (October 2026)
- Peak rating: 2630 (January 2002)
- Peak ranking: No. 45 (January 1992)

Alexander Goldin (born February 27, 1964) is an American chess grandmaster of Russian origin.

Goldin had success from a young age. In 1981 he won the USSR Under-18 Championship. He was a joint winner of the Soviet Championship semifinal at Sevastopol in 1986 (a qualifier for the 1987 First League Final). Other tournament successes include winning the Philadelphia's World Open in 1998 and 2001. In 2003, Goldin won the American Continental Chess Championship in Buenos Aires edging out on tiebreak score Giovanni Vescovi, after both players scored 8.5/11.

In team chess, he played board three for the US team at the 2004 Chess Olympiad in Calvià and registered a 65% score.
