= Babakuli Annakov =

Turkmenistani-American chess grandmaster (born 1972)

Personal information
- Born: May 29, 1972 (age 54)

Chess career
- Country: Soviet Union → Turkmenistan (before 2005); United States (after 2005)
- Title: Grandmaster (1998)
- FIDE rating: 2429 (October 2026)
- Peak rating: 2600 (July 1998)
- Peak ranking: No. 77 (July 1998)

Babakuli Annakov (born 1972) is a Turkmen-American chess Grandmaster.

== Career ==
Annakov began to participate in international tournaments after the collapse of the USSR. In 1992, he won a silver medal in the individual championship of Turkmenistan and took part in the world championship among juniors under 20 in Buenos Aires. In 1993, Annakov shared second place with Vitaly Golod, Alexey Bezgodov and Valery Yandemirov at a round-robin tournament in Ufa. In 1996, he shared 1st place in a tournament in Moscow, and in 1997 he won with Evgeny Vorobyov next tournament in this city. These successes allowed Annakov to score 2,585 points and enter the first hundred of the FIDE world rankings (98th place in the world as of January 1, 1998).

Already on July 1 of the same 1998, with 2600 points, he climbed to 78th place in the world. In 2000, Annakov won the Foxwoods Open in Mashantucket, Connecticut, USA. Subsequently, he did not achieve significant international success, with the exception of 1st place at the World Open chess tournament in Philadelphia in 2003, which Annakov shared with Jaan Ehlvest, Ilya Smirin and Alexander Onischuk. The lack of significant success and the decline in tournament activity led to a gradual decrease in the chess player's rating. Since 2005 he has been living in the USA in Frisco, Texas. He is married and has a child, which has led to his inactivity in the chess sphere.
