= Patrick Wolff =

American chess grandmaster (born 1968)

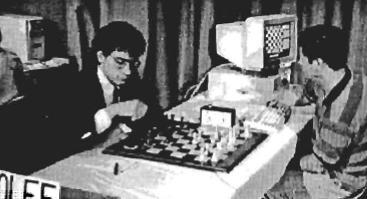
- Wolff (left) in 1992

Personal information
- Born: February 15, 1968 (age 58) Boston, Massachusetts

Chess career
- Country: United States
- Title: Grandmaster (1990)
- FIDE rating: 2530 (October 2026)
- Peak rating: 2595 (January 1994)
- Peak ranking: No. 54 (July 1992)

Patrick Gideon Wolff (born February 15, 1968) is an American chess Grandmaster and politician. He is the son of philosopher Robert Paul Wolff and historian Cynthia Griffin Wolff and brother of law professor Tobias Barrington Wolff. Wolff won the United States Chess Championship in 1992 and 1995.

== Chess career ==
In addition to his two United States championships (1992 and 1995), Wolff also had a distinguished scholastic chess career, winning the 1983 National High School Championship and the 1987 U.S. Junior Championship.

Kasparov vs. Wolff, New York 1988

Position: f1 white king, g2 white bishop, f2 black pawn, d2 black queen, b2 white pawn, a2 white pawn, f3 white pawn, h4 black bishop, e4 white queen, h7 black pawn, f7 black pawn, b7 black pawn, a7 black pawn, h8 black king, f8 black rook, e8 white knight, c8 white rook

Final position

In 1988, in a game played in New York City, Wolff defeated the world champion Garry Kasparov during a simultaneous exhibition in just 25 moves with the black pieces:

1.c4 e5 2.g3 Nf6 3.Bg2 c6 4.d4 exd4 5.Qxd4 d5 6.cxd5 cxd5 7.Nf3 Nc6 8.Qa4 Be7 9.0-0 0-0 10.Be3 Ng4 11.Bd4 Nxd4 12.Nxd4 Qb6 13.Nc3 Qh6 14.h4 g5 15.Nxd5 Bd8 16.Rac1 gxh4 17.Rxc8 hxg3 18.Nf3 Nh2 19.Rfc1 Rxc8 20.Rxc8 Nxf3+ 21.exf3 gxf2+ 22.Kf1 Qd2 23.Nf6+ Kg7 24.Ne8+ Kh8 25.Qe4 Bh4 0–1

This game, although played as part of a simultaneous exhibition against five other masters, was one of Kasparov's shortest losses in his career.

In 1995, the same year he won his second United States championship, Wolff served as a second to challenger Viswanathan Anand in preparation for the Classical World Chess Championship 1995 match against champion Kasparov. Although Anand led the match after nine games, Kasparov eventually prevailed 10.5 to 7.5.

Wolff is also the author of the Complete Idiot's Guide to Chess. He graduated from Harvard College in 1996, and the trophy of the annual Harvard-Yale intercollegiate chess match is named the Wolff Cup in his honor, as he remains the only grandmaster to participate in the match as a member of both colleges (beginning at Yale University and graduating from Harvard).

Wolff's game against Vassily Ivanchuk from the Biel Invitational in 1993 was featured in the 2020 Netflix limited series, The Queen's Gambit. Kasparov, who acted as a chess consultant for the series, selected and modified the 1993 game to serve as the game played during the series' climax.

== Investing career ==
Wolff was previously a managing director at San Francisco hedge fund Clarium, a $3B global macro hedge fund. He left Clarium to launch Grandmaster Capital Management, a hedge fund that received seed capital from Peter Thiel, the founder of Clarium and a strong chess player himself.

Hedge Fund Alert reported that Wolff started the wind-down process of Grandmaster Capital in June 2015.

Over the past several years, Wolff has given a blindfolded simultaneous exhibition for all comers at the annual Berkshire Hathaway shareholder meeting in Omaha, Nebraska which were attended by former CEO Warren Buffett and former Vice-Chairman Charlie Munger.

== Run for public office ==
Wolff entered the 2026 race for California's Insurance Commissioner. According to Wolff, the January 2025 Southern California wildfires inspired him to run for California Insurance Commissioner, and he has no plans to run for any other office in the future. Wolff's platform included "holding insurance companies accountable, increasing choice and competition, and improving transparency". As part of his campaign, Wolff engaged in speed chess with voters, with a promise to reward any voter who defeats him with one month of homeowner's or renter's insurance. He ultimately failed to advance to the general election after finishing fifth.

== Personal life ==
Wolff is the youngest son of the philosopher Robert Paul Wolff and literary historian Cynthia Griffin Wolff. His brother is professor of law Tobias Barrington Wolff.

Originally from the Boston area, Wolff currently resides in San Francisco.

Preceded by Gata Kamsky	United States Chess Champion; 1992	Succeeded by Alexander Shabalov and Alex Yermolinsky
Preceded by Boris Gulko	United States Chess Champion; 1995 (with Nick de Firmian and Alexander Ivanov)	Succeeded by Alex Yermolinsky
