= Harvard–Yale chess match =

The Harvard–Yale chess match is held annually around the time of the Harvard–Yale football game in November on the campus of the university hosting the football game. The tradition dates as far back as 1900. It is a relatively informal match and the schools do not typically submit the games to the United States Chess Federation for rating. Nevertheless, it is one of the highlights of the year for each school's chess club. The match typically consists of four or five games, pitting the top current Harvard and Yale students (undergraduate or graduate). The team with the most game points is declared the winner of the match, with a win worth 1 point, a draw worth half a point, and a loss worth 0 points. In the case of a tie, either the match is declared a tie, or a tie-breaking procedure is applied. Tie-breaking procedures applied in the past included using the result of the strongest non-drawing board as the result of the match, or using results achieved by non-A-teams in the Open section. Match details vary each year depending on the preferences of current members of each school's chess club.

Those who play in the match are typically strong tournament players. The ratings usually range from around 800 to 2600 USCF. Players occasionally are FIDE International Masters or grandmasters.

As of 2025, Yale is the champion, holding an overall record of 11-4-9 against Harvard.

== Results ==
Year	Site	Match format	Tie-break	Winner	Score	Average USCF ratings	
Year	Site	Match format	Tie-break	Winner	Score	Harvard	Yale
2025	Yale	6 boards, G15+10	Additional boards	Yale	4-2	2083	2375
2024	Harvard	4 boards, G25/D5	Additional boards	Yale	1F-0F	2415	2496
2023	Yale	4 boards, G25/D5	Additional boards	Yale	1F-0F	2415	2351
2022	Harvard	4 boards, G25/D5	Additional boards	Yale	2½–1½	2407	2396
2021	Yale	4 boards, 2x	None	Yale	6–2	2257	2384
2020	Harvard	Canceled due to COVID-19 pandemic					
2019	Yale	3 boards, 2x G/30	None	Yale	5½–½		
2018	Harvard	5 boards, G/30	None	Harvard	4–1		
2017	Yale	5 boards, G/30	None	Tie	2½–2½		
2016	Harvard	5 boards, G/30	None	Harvard	5–0	2328	
2015	Yale	5 boards, G/45	None	Harvard	4–1		
2014	Harvard	5 boards, G/45	6th board	Harvard	3–2	2162	2031
2013	Yale	5 boards, G/60		Yale	3–2	2069	2200
2012	Harvard	5 boards, G/60	Additional boards	Tie	2½–2½		2211
2011	Yale	5 boards, G/60	Additional boards	Yale	3–2	2119	2258
2010	Harvard	5 boards, G/60		Harvard	3–2		
2009	Yale	5 boards, G/60		Harvard	3–2		
2008	Harvard	5 boards, G/45	None	Harvard	4–1	2186	2079
2007	Yale			Tie			
2006	Harvard			Harvard	3–2		
2005	Yale	5 boards, G/60	Non-draw result on strongest board	Yale	3–2	2083	2092
2004	Harvard	4 boards, G/60	None	Tie	2–2	2118	2225
2003							
2002							
2001				Yale			
2000				Harvard		2066	
1999				Yale			

== Lineups ==
2011

- Harvard: Jake Miller, Bram Louis, Josh Bakker, Naor Brown, Tony Blum
- Yale: Robert Hess, Bogdan Vioreanu, Patrick O’Keefe, Adam Weser, Gordon Moseley

2008

- Yale: Bogdan Vioreanu, Kurt Schneider, Pasha Kamyshev, Gordon Moseley, Rahil Esmail

2005

- Yale: David Wang, Matthew Traldi, Pavel Kamyshev, Scott Caplan, David Lyons
- Harvard: Arin Madenci, Dan Thomas, Danny Goodman, Albert Yeh, Annie Weiss

2004

- Harvard: Geoffrey Gelman, Daniel H. Thomas, Arin Madenci, Annie Weiss
- Yale: Akira Watanabe, Matthew Traldi, Haoyuan Wang, Scott Caplan

2001

- Harvard: Daniel H. Thomas, Marc R. Esserman, Victor M. Lee, Yue Wu, Lu Yin, Jason Rihel, Noam Elkies

2000

- Harvard: Yakov Chudnovsky, Jonathan A. Wolff, Charles R. Riordan, Lu Yin

== Notable players who have competed in the match ==
=== FIDE Grandmasters ===
- Nicolas Checa (Yale, 2021, 2022)
- Darwin Yang (Harvard: 2016)
- Robert Hess (Yale: 2011, 2012, 2013, 2014)
- Patrick Wolff (Yale, Harvard, GM title earned in 1990)
- Joel Benjamin (Yale, GM title earned in 1986)

=== FIDE International Masters ===
- Richard Wang (Harvard: 2016)
- Matthew Larson (Yale: 2015, IM title earned in 2018)
- Bogdan Vioreanu (Yale: 2008, 2009, 2010, 2011)
- Marc Esserman (Harvard: 2001, IM title earned in 2009)
- Teddy Coleman (Harvard: 2008, 2009, 2010, IM title earned in 2012)

=== Other ===
- Kurt Hugo Schneider (Yale: 2006, 2008, 2009)

== Notable Games ==
- 2009, Board 1, Coleman (H) vs. Vioreanu (Y)
- 2010, Board 1, Coleman (H) vs. Vioreanu (Y)
- 2025, Board 3, Derek Jin (H) vs. Raahil Mullick (Y)
