= Robert Paul Wolff =

American political philosopher (1933–2025)

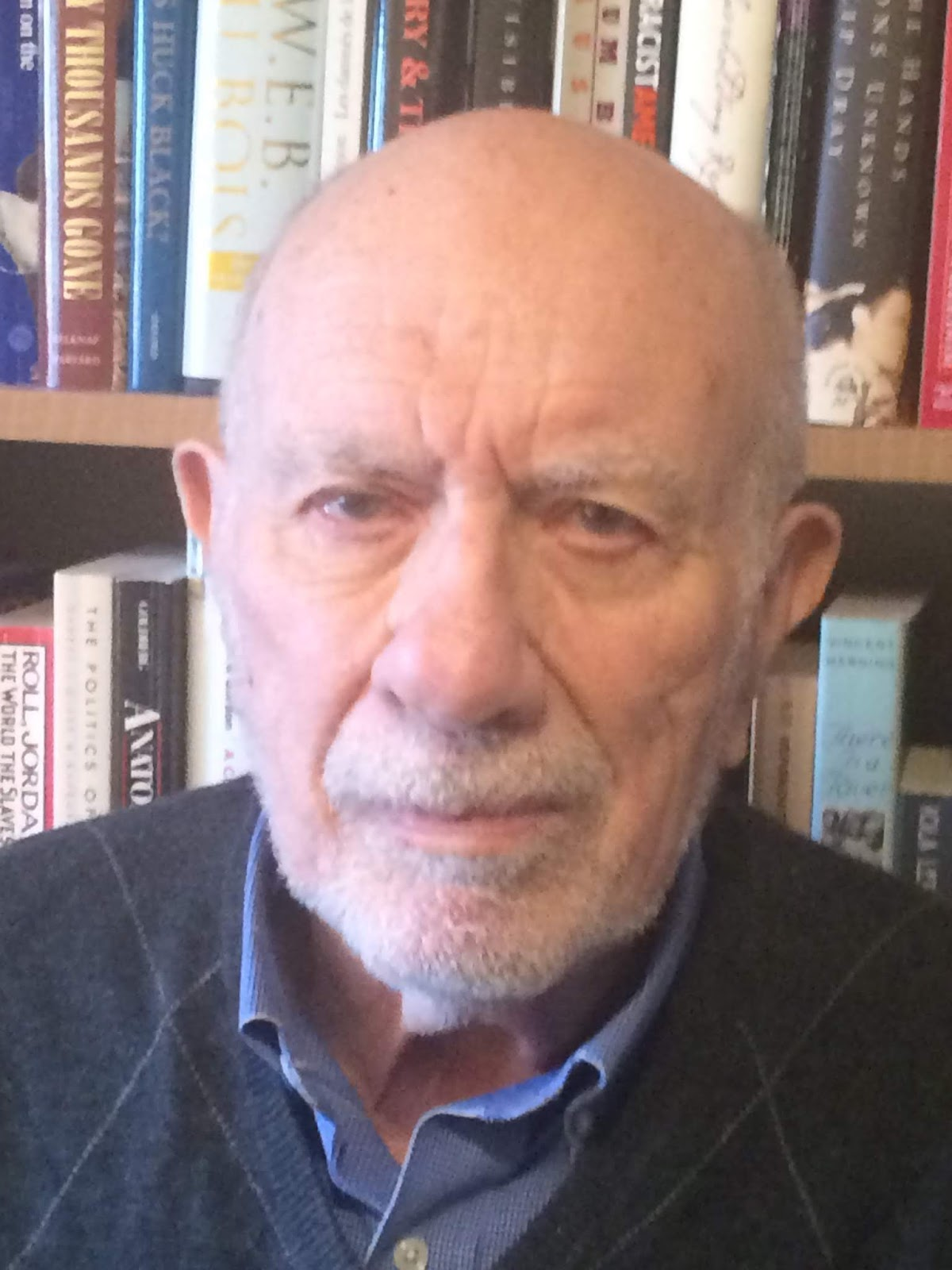
- Wolff in 2018
- Born: December 27, 1933; New York City, U.S.
- Died: January 6, 2025 (aged 91); Durham, North Carolina, U.S.
- Spouse: Cynthia Griffin Wolff (m. 1962; div. 1986) Susan Gould (m. 1988)

Academic background
- Education: Harvard University (BA, MA, PhD)
- Doctoral advisor: Roderick Firth

Academic work
- Institutions: University of Chicago; Columbia University; University of Massachusetts Amherst
- Notable works: In Defense of Anarchism (1970)

Robert Paul Wolff (December 27, 1933 – January 6, 2025) was an American political philosopher and professor emeritus at the University of Massachusetts Amherst.

Wolff wrote widely on topics in political philosophy, including Marxism, tolerance (against liberalism and in favor of anarchism), political justification, and democracy.

== Early life and career ==
Robert Wolff was born in New York City on December 27, 1933, to Walter Harold and Charlotte (Ornstein) Wolff. He graduated from Harvard University with a B.A., M.A., and Ph.D. in philosophy in 1953, 1954, and 1957 respectively.

Wolff was an instructor in philosophy and general education at Harvard University from 1958 to 1961, an assistant professor of philosophy at the University of Chicago from 1961 to 1964, associate professor and then professor of philosophy at Columbia University from 1964 to 1971, and then, at the University of Massachusetts Amherst, professor of philosophy from 1971 to 1992, professor of Afro-American studies from 1992 to 2008, and professor emeritus since 2008.

== Scholarship ==
After interest in normative political philosophy resurged in the Anglo-American world upon the publication of John Rawls's A Theory of Justice, Wolff made pointed criticisms of it from a roughly Marxist perspective. In 1977, he published Understanding Rawls: A Critique and Reconstruction of A Theory of Justice, which takes aim at the extent to which Rawls's theory is cued to existing practice, convention, and status quo social science. Insofar as A Theory of Justice forecloses critiques of capitalist social relations, private property and the market economy, Wolff concluded that Rawls's project amounted to a form of apology for the status quo, since, according to Wolff, markets and capitalist social relations are founded on exploitation and injustice, and Rawls did not defend his theory against these charges.

In The Poverty of Liberalism, Wolff pointed out inconsistencies in 20th-century liberal and conservative doctrines, taking as his starting points John Stuart Mill's On Liberty and Principles of Political Economy.

Wolff's 1970 book In Defense of Anarchism is widely read, and the first two editions sold more than 200,000 copies. It argues that if we accept a robust conception of individual autonomy, then there can be no de jure legitimate state. Wolff was praised for this work, including, to his surprise, by many on the political right, such as right-wing libertarians and anarcho-capitalists.

Wolff extended his advocacy of radical participatory democracy to university governance in The Ideal of the University, in which he argues against rising marketization and external encroachment and that universities should be governed primarily by faculty and students. He further expounded his views on the value of a liberal education in his essay "What Good Is A Liberal Education?"

Within his profession, Wolff was better known for his work on Kant, particularly his books Kant's Theory of Mental Activity: A Commentary on the Transcendental Analytic of the Critique of Pure Reason and The Autonomy of Reason: A Commentary on Kant's Groundwork of the Metaphysics of Morals. He was also a noted commentator on the works of Karl Marx. His works include Understanding Marx: A Reconstruction and Critique of Capital and Moneybags Must Be So Lucky: On the Structure of Capital, an analysis of Marx's rhetorical and literary techniques in Das Kapital. His textbook About Philosophy is used widely in introductory college philosophy courses.

Wolff was also distinguished as a white man who transitioned from the philosophy department to the department of Afro-American studies of the University of Massachusetts-Amherst, as chronicled in his book Autobiography of an Ex-White Man: Learning a New Master Narrative for America.

In 1990, Wolff founded University Scholarships for South African Students, an organization devoted to promoting opportunities in higher education within South Africa for disadvantaged South African students. Since its creation, USSAS has assisted in providing funding and educational opportunities for thousands of students in South Africa.

== Personal life and death ==
Wolff was married to literary historian Cynthia Griffin Wolff from 1962 until their divorce in 1986. He had two children from this marriage, Patrick Gideon Wolff, an international chess grandmaster, and Tobias Barrington Wolff, a gay rights legal activist who is Jefferson Barnes Fordham Professor of Law at the University of Pennsylvania. Wolff's second wife was his childhood sweetheart, Susan Gould. They lived in Chapel Hill, North Carolina.

Wolff split his time between Chapel Hill and Paris, France. He maintained a blog, The Philosopher's Stone, where he discussed philosophy and political issues and wrote an online autobiography in a series of posts.

Wolff died on January 6, 2025, at Duke University Hospital, aged 91.

== Selected bibliography ==
- Kant's Theory of Mental Activity (1963)
- A Critique of Pure Tolerance with Herbert Marcuse and Barrington Moore Jr. (1965)
- The Poverty of Liberalism (1968)
- The Ideal of the University (1969)
- In Defense of Anarchism (1970)
- The Autonomy of Reason (1974)
- About Philosophy (1976)
- Understanding Rawls (1977)
- Understanding Marx (1984)
- Moneybags Must Be So Lucky (1988)
- Autobiography of an Ex-White Man (2005)
