= International Who's Who of Authors and Writers =

International Who's Who of Authors and Writers 2020, 35th edition.

The International Who's Who of Authors and Writers, formerly The International Authors and Writers Who's Who, is a biographical guide to authors that has been published under various titles since 1934.

== History ==
The work had been published by Burke's Peerage since 1934 as The Authors and Writers Who's Who, going through six editions before it was acquired by Melrose Press of Cambridge in 1974 who merged it with material collected for their planned World's Who's Who of Authors which also incorporated material from the nine volumes of the County Authors Today series for the United Kingdom, and the unpublished American Authors Today. The first edition published by Melrose was titled The International Authors and Writers Who's Who and published in 1976 as the seventh edition in the series.

The work was acquired by Routledge in 2002 and retitled the International Who's Who of Authors and Writers.
