= Varuzhan Akobian =

Armenian-American chess grandmaster (born 1983)

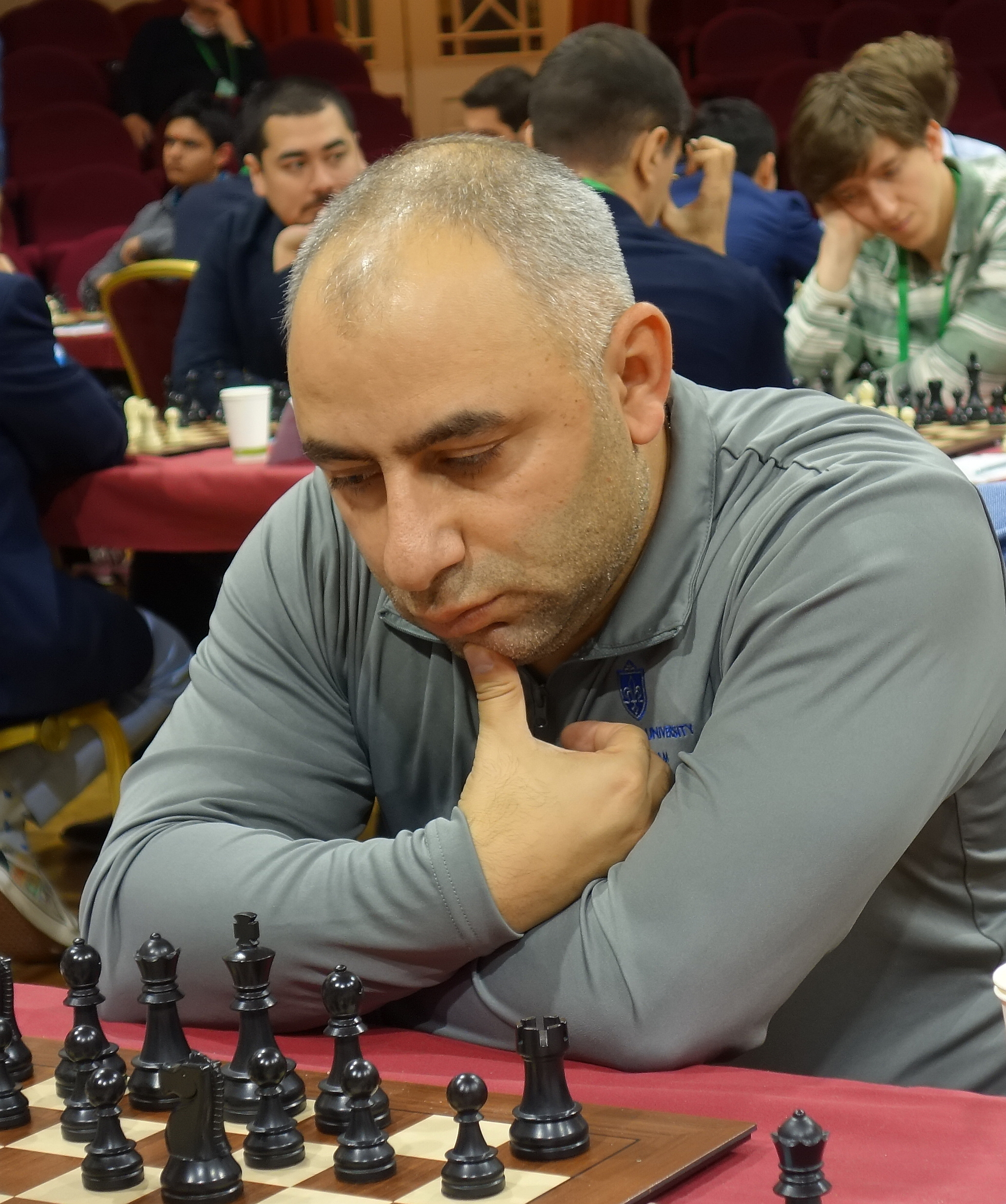
- Akobian in 2023

Personal information
- Born: 19 November 1983 (age 42) Yerevan, Armenian SSR, Soviet Union

Chess career
- Country: Armenia (until 2002); United States (since 2002)
- Title: Grandmaster (2004)
- FIDE rating: 2553 (October 2026)
- Peak rating: 2673 (June 2017)
- Peak ranking: No. 76 (June 2017)

Varuzhan Akobian (Armenian: Վարուժան Հակոբյան, born 19 November 1983 in Yerevan, Soviet Union) is an Armenian-born American chess Grandmaster. Originally from Armenia, he now resides in St. Louis. He played on the bronze medal-winning U.S. team in the 2006 and 2008 Chess Olympiads.

== Chess career ==
Akobian, an Armenian-American, became an International Master at age 16. In 2001, he moved to the United States and one week after his 20th birthday in November 2003, earned the title of Grandmaster.

He won the World Open in Philadelphia on three occasions; he shared first place in 2002 and won it outright in 2004 and 2007. In 2006, he tied for first in the San Marino tournament with a performance rating of 2796. In 2007, he tied for 1st–8th with Hikaru Nakamura, Alexander Shabalov, Darmen Sadvakasov, Zviad Izoria, Victor Mikhalevski, Magesh Chandran Panchanathan and Justin Sarkar in the Miami Open and came equal first in the American Continental Championship in Cali, Colombia. This qualified him for the 2007 World Cup, where he was eliminated in the first round by Michael Roiz. He also took part in the 2009 World Cup, where he defeated Pavel Tregubov in the first round in a 16-game match, before being knocked out in the second round by Ruslan Ponomariov.

In 2007, Akobian was featured on MTV's True Life documentary series, in an episode titled "I'm a Genius".

In May 2014, he was the fifth highest-rated player in the US, with a FIDE rating of 2643. In the 2014 U.S. Championship, he tied for first place with Gata Kamsky and Aleksandr Lenderman. This tie led to a three-player playoff to decide the champion. Akobian defeated Lenderman in an Armageddon Game and advanced to the playoff final, a rapid match against Kamsky, in which Kamsky won 1.5-0.5 to win the championship.

Akobian currently serves as head coach for the Saint Louis University chess team.
