= Vladislav Vorotnikov =

Russian chess grandmaster (born 1947)

Personal information
- Born: August 17, 1947 (age 78) Leningrad, Soviet Union

Chess career
- Country: Russia
- Title: Grandmaster (2005)
- Peak rating: 2510 (July 1996)

Vladislav Vladimirovich Vorotnikov (Russian: Владислав Владимирович Воротников born on August 17, 1947, in Leningrad) is a Soviet and Russian chess player (grandmaster in 2005).

As part of the Leningrad team, he participated in 3 USSR championships between the teams of the union republics (1975, 1979 and 1981) in which he won a bronze medal in the team (1975) and a silver medal in the individual standings (1979, played on the reserve board).

He was a participant of several championships in Leningrad (in 1979) and Moscow (in 1996 - shared 1st place with Alexander Lastin and Yuri Balashov); international tournaments in Leipzig and Turku (in 1979 - 1st); Leipzig (in 1982) and Kislovodsk (1st place).

He was the quarterfinalist of the European Chess Clubs Cup (1991/1992) as part of Tigran Petrosian's club.

== FIDE ratings ==
Elo development
View chart definition.
