= Magesh Chandran Panchanathan =

Indian chess grandmaster (born 1983)

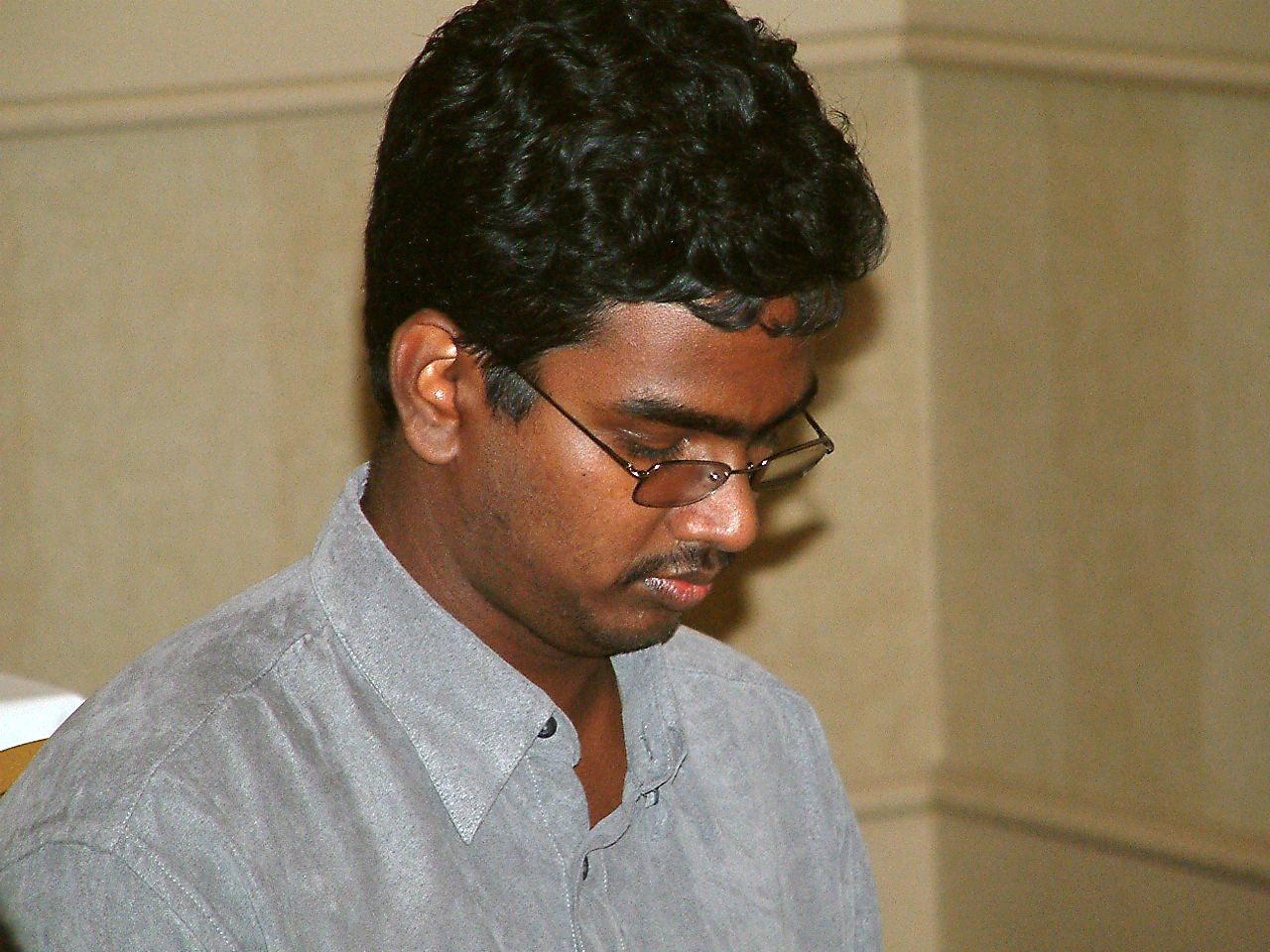
- World Open 2004

Personal information
- Born: 10 August 1983 (age 42) Madurai, India

Chess career
- Country: India
- Title: Grandmaster (2006)
- FIDE rating: 2444 (July 2026)
- Peak rating: 2586 (September 2011)

Magesh Chandran Panchanathan (born 10 August 1983) is an Indian chess player. He was awarded the title of Grandmaster by FIDE in 2006.

== Biography ==
Magesh Chandran was born in Madurai. In 2003 he won the Asian Junior Chess Championship in Sri Lanka. In 2005 he shared first place with Kamil Mitoń in the 33rd World Open, played in Philadelphia over the Independence Day weekend. In the same year he came first in the UTD GM Invitational Tournament in Richardson, Texas. In 2008 he tied for 3rd–6th with Nguyen Anh Dung, Sadikin Irwanto and Susanto Megaranto in the Kuala Lumpur Open. In 2009 he tied for 1st–4th with Alexander Areshchenko, Koneru Humpy and Evgenij Miroshnichenko in the Mumbai Mayor Cup and in 2010 tied for 3rd–6th with Vladimir Malaniuk, David Smerdon, and Saptarshi Roy Chowdhury in the Doeberl Cup in Canberra. In 2011 he tied for 2nd–4th with Tigran L. Petrosian and Abhijeet Gupta in the 3rd Orissa International GM Open Chess Tournament and came third at Berkeley. In 2012 he won the Philadelphia Open outright with 7/9 points. In 2015 he won, tied with Sergei Azarov, the New Jersey Open tournament, which took place in Morristown; both players scored 5/6.

Magesh Chandran completed both undergraduate and graduate degrees at the University of Texas at Dallas.

== Notable games ==
Fink vs. Panchanathan, Philadelphia 2005

Position: h1 white rook, c1 white rook, g2 white pawn, e2 white king, g3 black bishop, f3 white bishop, b3 white queen, a3 white pawn, h4 black pawn, e4 white pawn, c4 white knight, b4 white pawn, e5 black pawn, d5 white pawn, b5 black bishop, a6 black queen, h7 black pawn, f7 black pawn, e7 black pawn, b7 black pawn, a7 black pawn, h8 black rook, e8 black king, c8 black rook

Final position

Below is an excerpt from an article by Lubomir Kavalek in The Washington Post on 11 July 2005:

Sharing first place at the World Open is Panchanathan's best career result. He can play sharply, as a local Virginia master, Stanley Fink Jr., found out in a messy line of the Trompowsky Opening.

Fink–Panchanathan
1. d4 Nf6 2. Bg5 Ne4 3. Bh4 (This old line of the Trompowsky opening has been resurrected by Spanish grandmaster Juan Bellon Lopez. ) 3... g5!? (Leading to a sharp double-edged position. Black can avoid it with the solid 3...d5.) 4. f3 gxh4 5. fxe4 c5 6. e3 Bh6 (White can't oppose this strong bishop.) 7. Nd2!? (Bellon's discovery. He first tried 7.d5 and only after 7...Bxe3 8.Nd2. Another promising try is 7.Bc4. Protecting the pawn on e3 with 7.Kf2 can be met with 7...d5!) 7... Bxe3 8. Ngf3?! (Allowing black to reign on the dark squares. Bellon prefers to close the position with 8.d5.) 8... cxd4 9. Nc4 Nc6 10. c3 (Now 10.Nxe3 dxe3 11.Qe2 Qb6 12.0-0-0 d6 is better for black.) 10... d6 11. cxd4 Bf4 12. d5 (Conceding the dark squares, but holding the center was difficult. White's position collapses quickly after 12.Nxh4 d5! 13.exd5 Qxd5 14.Nf3 Bg4.) 12... Ne5 13. Ncxe5? (White might have missed black's next move; otherwise he would play 13.Nfxe5 dxe5 14.Qb3.) 13... Qa5+! 14. Nd2 dxe5 15. a3 (Losing more time trying to get out of black's grip.) 15... Bd7 16. b4 Qb6 17. Nc4 Qg6 18. Be2? (A blunder, but white has difficulties even after 18.Qf3 Rc8!, for example 19.Be2 h5! 20.h3 Bg3+ 21.Kf1 f5.) 18... Bxh2!? (Winning a pawn immediately, but even stronger was 18...b5!, for example 19.Nb2 Qxg2 20.Rf1 Bxh2; or 19.Na5 Qxg2 20.Bf3 Qb2 and black should win.) 19. Bf3 (On 19.Rxh2 Qg3+ nets the rook.) 19... Bg3+ 20. Ke2 Rc8 21. Rc1 Bb5 22. Qb3 Qa6 (The pin together with the dominance on dark squares decides, for example: 23.Kd3 Qb6 24.Qb2 Bf2 threatening 25...Qe3+.) White resigns.
