= Florin Gheorghiu =

Romanian chess grandmaster (born 1944)

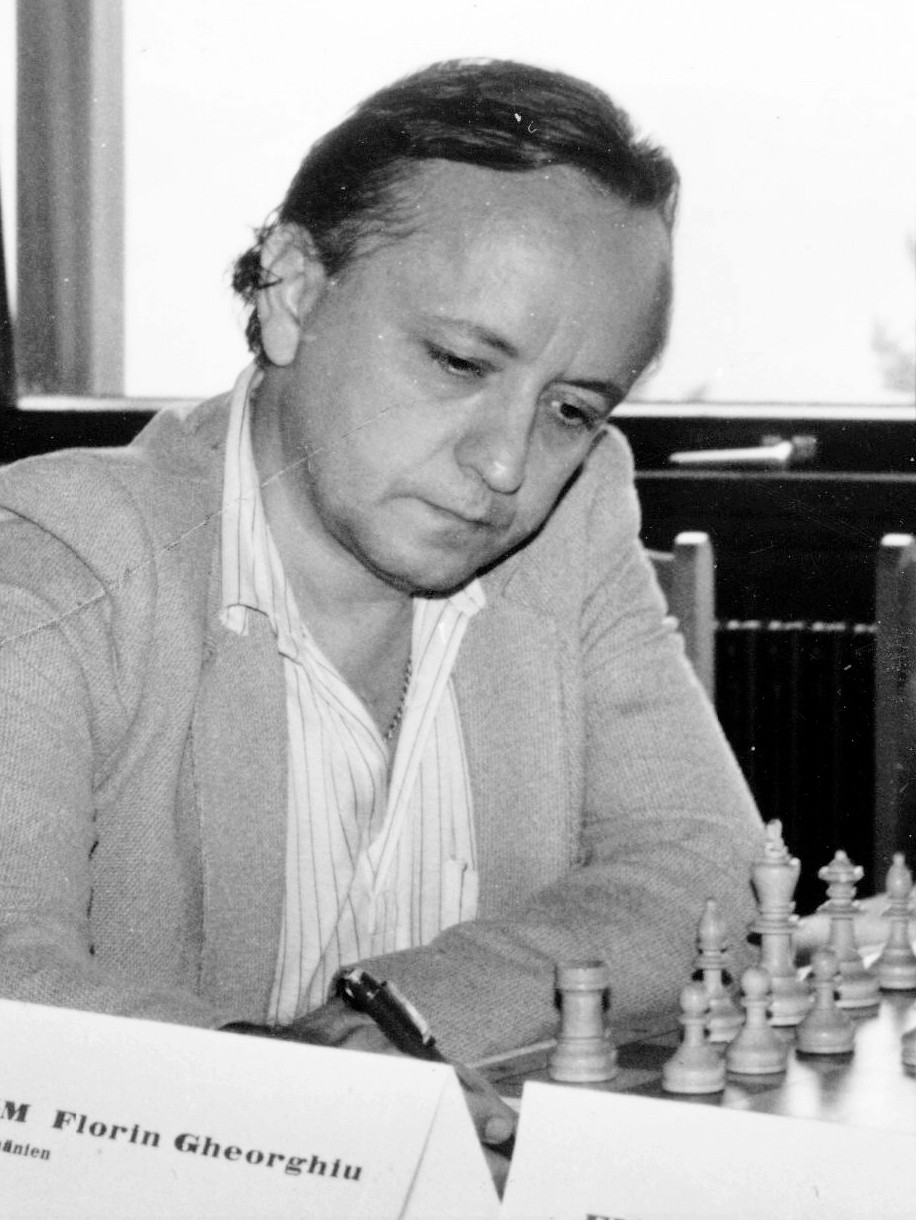
- Gheorghiu in Altensteig, 1987

Personal information
- Born: 6 April 1944 (age 82) Ploiești, Kingdom of Romania

Chess career
- Country: Romania
- Title: Grandmaster (1965)
- Peak rating: 2605 (January 1980)
- Peak ranking: No. 10 (January 1980)

Florin Gheorghiu (born 6 April 1944) is a Romanian chess player and has been a university lecturer in foreign languages.

Born in Ploiești, on 6 April 1944, during the Allied bombing of the country's capital, his talent for the game was evidenced by his early achievements; he became an International Master in 1963 and Romania's first Grandmaster just two years later.

He earned the title of World Junior Champion in 1963, at Vrnjačka Banja, and has been the national champion of Romania on nine occasions.

Gheorghiu was a lecturer in French at the University of Bucharest and he also speaks English, Russian, German, and Spanish.

== Chess career ==
When playing at his peak on the international tournament circuit, he was many times a winner. His victories included: Hastings 1967–68 (with Hort and Stein), Reykjavik 1972 (with Hort and Ólafsson), Orense 1973, Torremolinos 1974 (with Torre), Lone Pine 1979 (with Gligorić, Liberzon, and Hort), Novi Sad 1979, Biel 1982 (with Nunn) and Lenk 1990. He was always a formidable opponent at the U.S. Open tournament and finished first in three successive years—1979, 1980 (with Fedorowicz), and 1981 (with Christiansen and three others).

In his home country, there were few who could rival his dominance of the 1960s, 1970s, and 1980s. He won the Romanian Championship nine times (1960, 1962, 1964, 1965, 1966, 1967, 1973, 1977, and 1987). In 1970 he was equal first with Victor Ciocâltea, and after a subsequent tie-break match (5-5), the latter was awarded the champion title.

Despite these successes, Gheorghiu has seldom been regarded a serious contender for the world chess championship title. Although he regularly participated in the cycle and at other prestigious events, his placings at four Interzonal Tournaments (world championship qualifiers) confirmed that he was not as strong as the world's elite players at the time, but could nevertheless perform consistently well at a high level. At Petrópolis 1973 he finished 14th, at Manila 1976 10–13th, Riga 1979 5–6th, and at Moscow 1982, he came 12th. At the Riga Interzonal, he only narrowly failed to qualify for the Candidates Matches. Overall, he participated in nine Zonal and four Interzonal tournaments.

Playing for Romania in team competitions, he amassed 459 games in 64 contests (including friendly matches with other nations), summing up to an overall result of 145 wins, 272 draws, and 42 losses. This included playing in every Chess Olympiad between 1962 and 1990, usually on first board. Further details are given in the table below.

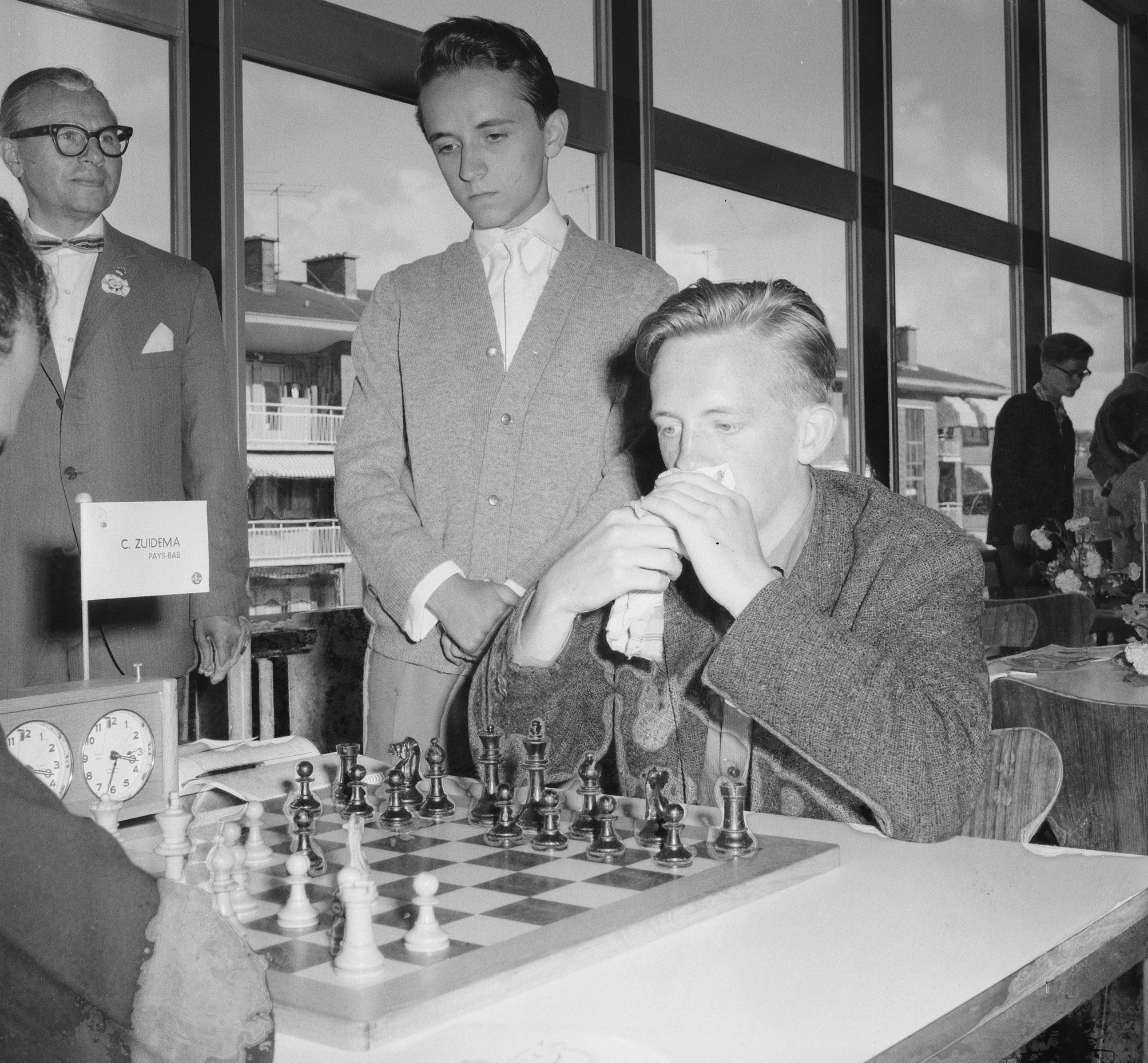
Gheorghiu standing to the side of the seated Coenraad Zuidema at the World Junior Championship 1961

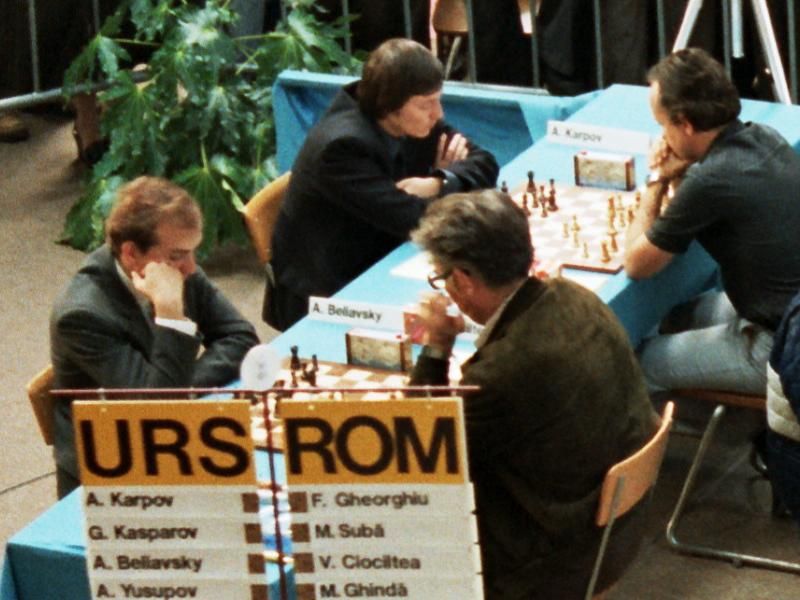
Gheorghiu (far right) playing against Anatoly Karpov at Luzern in 1982

Town	Year	Contest's name	+	=	-
Tbilisi	1960	friendly match S. S. R. Georgia – Romania (b. 5)	1	3	0
Leningrad	1960	World student team ch. VII (reserve 1)	5	1	1
Bucharest	1961	friendly match Romania – S. S. R. Georgia (b. 5)	3	1	0
Karl Marx-Stadt	1961	friendly match East Germany – Romania (b. 1)	1	0	1
Bucharest	1962	friendly match Romania – Bulgaria (b. 4)	1	1	0
Budapest	1962	friendly match Hungary – Romania (b. 5)	0	2	0
Mariánské Lázně	1962	World student team ch. IX (b. 1)	4	8	1
Varna	1962	Olympiad XV (b. 3)	6	8	1
Bucharest	1963	friendly match Romania – Hungary (b. 1)	2	0	0
Kraków	1964	World student team ch. XI (b. 1)	7	3	0
Sinaia	1964	preliminaries of European team ch. (b. 3)	4	2	0
Tel Aviv	1964	Olympiad XVI (b. 2)	8	8	1
Bucharest	1965	friendly match Romania – Poland (b.1)	1	1	0
Hamburg	1965	European team ch. III (b. 1)	1	7	2
Sinaia	1965	World student team ch. XII (b. 1)	8	4	1
Örebro	1966	World student team ch. XIII (b. 1)	8	6	0
Havana	1966	Olympiad XVII (b. 1)	9	7	3
Bucharest	1966	friendly match Romania – S. S. R. Latvia (b. 1)	0	2	0
Warsaw	1967	friendly match Poland – Romania (b. 1)	0	2	0
Sofia	1967	preliminaries of European team ch. (b. 1)	2	4	0
Harrachov	1967	World student team ch. XIV (b. 1)	4	7	0
Lugano	1968	Olympiad XVIII (b. 1)	3	14	0
Novi Sad	1969	friendly match Yugoslavia – Romania (b. 1)	0	2	0
Bucharest	1970	friendly match Romania – Yugoslavia (b. 1)	0	2	0
Siegen	1970	Olympiad XIX (b.1)	6	10	3
Bamberg	1971	friendly match Romania – West Germany (b. 1)	0	2	0
Athens	1971	Balkaniad III (b. 1)	1	2	1
Bucharest	1971	preliminaries of European team ch. (b. 2)	2	0	0
Sofia	1972	Balkaniad IV (b. 1)	2	2	0
Skopje	1972	Olympiad XX (b. 1)	5	12	3
Bath	1973	European team ch. V (b.1)	0	5	2
Paris	1973	friendly match France – Romania (b. 1)	1	0	0
Poiana Brașov	1973	Balkaniad V (b. 1)	0	4	0
Nice	1974	Olympiad XXI (b. 1)	5	13	0
Poreč	1974	Balkaniad VI (b. 1)	0	3	0
Istanbul	1975	Balkaniad VII (b. 1)	0	4	0
Crans Montana	1976	preliminaries of European team ch. (b. 1)	1	3	0
Bucharest	1976	friendly match Romania – R. F. G. (b. 1)	0	2	0
Athens	1976	friendly match Greece – Romania (b. 1)	2	0	0
Athens	1976	Balkaniad VIII (b. 1)	1	2	1
Moscow	1977	European team ch. VI (b. 1)	1	5	1
Albena	1977	Balkaniad IX (b. 1)	2	2	0
Borås	1978	preliminaries of European team ch. (b. 1)	0	2	0
Băile Herculane	1978	Balkaniad X (b. 1)	3	1	0
Buenos Aires	1978	Olympiad XXIII (b. 1)	5	9	0
Bensheim	1979	friendly match West Germany – Romania (b. 1)	1	1	0
Istanbul	1980	Balkaniad XII (b. 1)	2	3	0
Malta	1980	Olympiad XXIV (b. 1)	3	7	2
Athens	1981	Balkaniad XIII (b. 1)	2	2	0
Lucerne	1982	Olympiad XXV (b. 1)	3	5	4
Băile Herculane	1983	Balkaniad XV (b. 2)	2	2	0
Zinnowitz	1983	friendly match East Germany – Romania	0	4	0
Eforie Nord	1984	friendly match Romania – East Germany	0	2	2
Skopje	1984	Balkaniad XVI (b. 1)	0	4	1
Salonic	1984	Olympiad XXVI (b. 2)	5	8	1
Iraklion	1985	Balkaniad XVII (b. 1)	2	2	0
Luzern	1985	World team ch. I (b. 2)	0	7	2
Dubai	1986	Olympiad XXVII (b. 2)	3	9	0
Kaštel Stari	1988	Balkaniad XX (b. 1)	0	6	0
Thessaloniki	1988	Olympiad XXVIII (b.1)	3	7	3
Haifa	1989	European team ch. IX (b. 1)	0	9	0
Kavala	1990	Balkaniad XXI (b. 1)	0	4	2
Novi Sad	1990	Olympiad XXIX (b. 1)	3	8	1
Debrecen	1992	European team ch. X (b. 1)	1	4	2

Gheorghiu is renowned for his success against the reputedly solid Nimzo-Indian Defence. The variation comprising an early f3 for White (which is allied to the Sämisch Variation) became his trademark weapon, improving on the games and development work of Lajos Portisch and Gyozo Forintos before him. The system is now referred to as the Gheorghiu Variation in many chess opening manuals and has been employed by tactical experts such as Alexei Shirov.

== Notable games ==
Gheorghiu vs. Fischer, Havana 1966

Position: a7 black pawn, g7 white pawn, b6 black pawn, f6 black pawn, g5 black king, a4 white pawn, h4 white rook, c3 white pawn, d3 white bishop, e3 black rook, h3 black pawn, h2 white king

Final position

Here is how Gheorghiu, playing White, beat future world champion Bobby Fischer at the Havana Olympiad in 1966. This was the only competitive game that Fischer ever lost to a player younger than himself.

1.d4 Nf6 2.c4 e6 3.Nc3 Bb4 4.f3 d5 5.a3 Bxc3+ 6.bxc3 0-0 7.cxd5 exd5 8.e3 Nh5 9.Qc2 Re8 10.g4 Nf4 11.h4 c5 12.Kf2 Ng6 13.Bd3 Nc6 14.Ne2 Be6 15.g5 Rc8 16.h5 Nf8 17.g6 fxg6 18.hxg6 h6 19.Qb1 Na5 20.Nf4 c4 21.Bc2 Rc6 22.Ra2 Nd7 23.a4 Nf6 24.Ba3 Qd7 25.Rb2 b6 26.Rb5 Nb7 27.e4 dxe4 28.Bxe4 Rcc8 29.Re5 Bg4 30.Nd5 Rxe5 31.Nxf6+ gxf6 32.dxe5 Nc5 33.Bxc5 Qd2+ 34.Kg3 Bxf3 35.Bxf3 Rxc5 36.Qc1 Qxc1 37.Rxc1 Rxe5 38.Kf4 Kg7 39.Be4 h5 40.Rd1 Re7 41.Rd5 Kh6 42.Rd6 Kg7 43.Rc6 h4 44.Rxc4 h3 45.Kg3 Kh6 46.Bb1 Re3+ 47.Kh2 Re1 48.Bd3 Re3 49.Rh4+ Kg5 50.g7 1–0
