= In Defense of Anarchism =

1970 book by Robert Paul Wolff

- Cover of the 1970 edition
- Author: Robert Paul Wolff
- Original title: In Defense of Anarchism : With a Reply to Jeffrey H. Reiman's In Defense of Political Philosophy
- Language: English
- Subject: Anarchism
- Publisher: Harper and Row
- Publication date: 1970
- Publication place: United States
- Media type: Print (Hardcover and Paperback)
- Pages: 80
- ISBN: 0-06-131541-9
- OCLC: 82066344

In Defense of Anarchism is a 1970 book by the philosopher Robert Paul Wolff, in which the author defends philosophical anarchism. He argues that individual autonomy and state authority are mutually exclusive and that, as individual autonomy is inalienable, the moral legitimacy of the state collapses.

First published by Harper and Row in 1970 as In Defense of Anarchism: With a Reply to Jeffrey H. Reiman's In Defense of Political Philosophy, it has since run to five editions, the latest of which is the University of California Press 1998 edition. It is regarded as a classical work in anarchist scholarship.

== Summary ==
The book has three parts: "The Conflict between Authority and Autonomy", "The Solution of Classical Democracy", "Beyond the Legitimate State", and an appendix, "Appendix: A proposal for Instant Direct Democracy". The book opens with Part I, "The Conflict between Authority and Autonomy", which Wolff begins by asserting that the moral autonomy of the individual can never be made compatible with the legitimate authority of the state".

Part II, "The Solution of Classical Democracy", is Wolff's account of democratic liberalism, the dominant political structure of the late 20th century. He investigates unanimous direct democracy, representative democracy, and majoritarian democracy, drawing on Rawlsian arguments for the practicality of consensus decision-making. Wolff argues that consensus is limited by the requirement that participants are generally rational and altruistic, and that the community in question is not too large. He goes on to critique the notion of democratic representation, pointing out that representation is an illusion as representatives do not obey the wishes of their constituents, and that it is impossible not to distinguish between the rulers and the ruled in a representational system.

In Part III, "Beyond the Legitimate State", Wolff arrives at the foreshadowed conclusion that because autonomy and the legitimacy of state power are incompatible, one must either embrace anarchism or surrender one's autonomy, as Thomas Hobbes proposed, to whichever authority seems strongest at the time. Democracy, in this schema, is no better than dictatorship, a priori, as both require forsaking one's autonomy.

== Reception ==
The book was well received not only in academic philosophy and in traditional anarchist circles, but also by anarcho-capitalists such as Murray Rothbard, whose letters of praise "chagrined" Wolff, who was shocked to have a position that was consonant to those he thought of as "right-wingers".

Wolff's premising of "the State" and the "autonomous individual" as fixed, given entities has been criticised by Thomas Martin in Social Anarchism as reflecting "basic assumptions arising from Renaissance humanism, Enlightenment liberalism, and the alliance of capitalism and central authority that has marked the industrial era." Such notions have been critiqued by late-20th-century currents in anarchist thought such as post-left anarchy, insurrectionary anarchism and particularly post-anarchism.

In Wolff's later work, The autonomy of reason; a commentary on Kant's Groundwork of the metaphysic of morals, he mentioned that his views had been revised considerably as a result of criticisms that he received from a student, Andrej Rapacznski, at Colombia University in the late 1960s.

== See also ==
- Analytical anarchism
- List of books about anarchism
