= John Fedorowicz =

American chess grandmaster (born 1958)

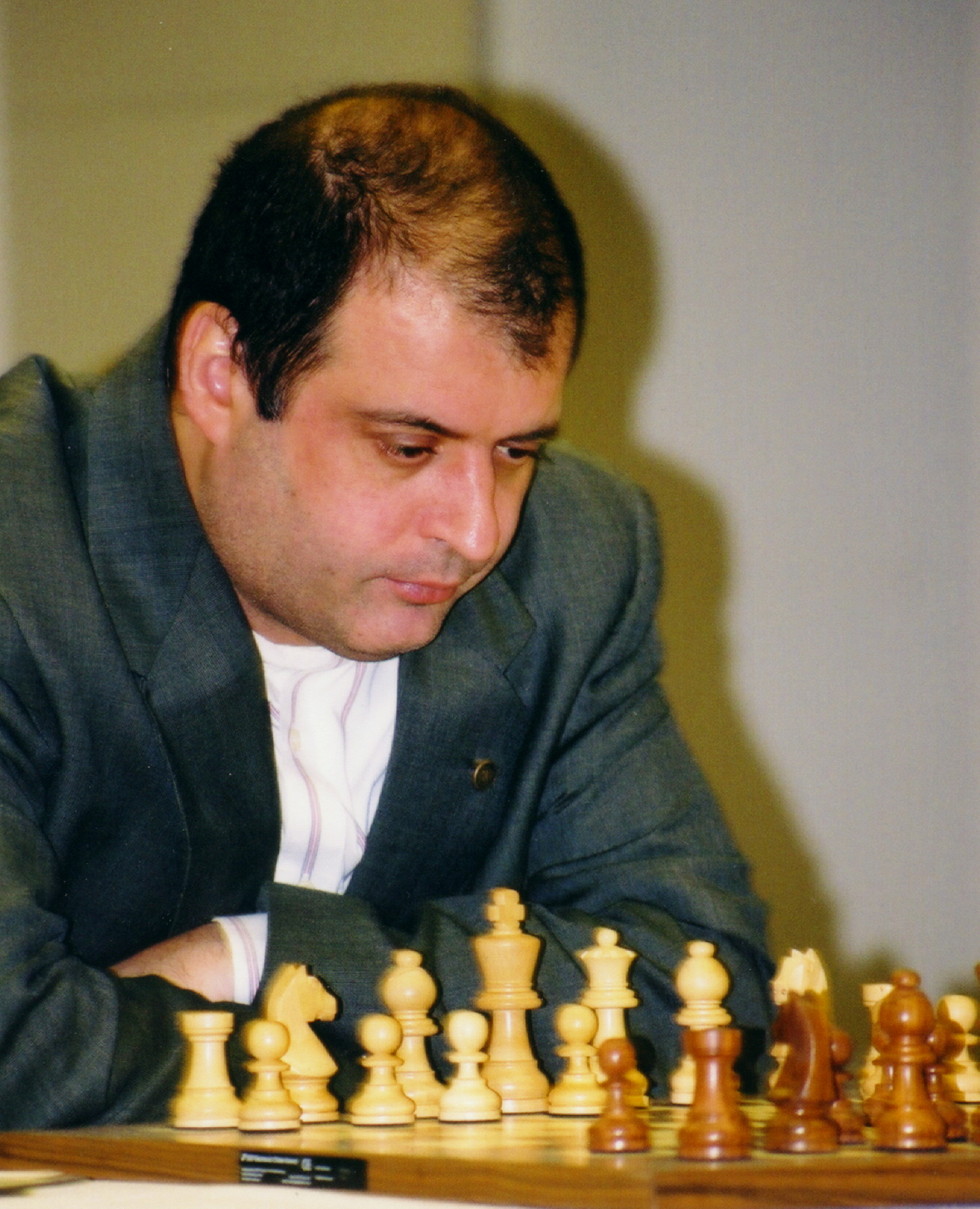
- Fedorowicz in 2002

Personal information
- Born: John Peter Fedorowicz; September 27, 1958 (age 68) New York City, New York, U.S.

Chess career
- Country: United States
- Title: Grandmaster (1986)
- Peak rating: 2574 (January 1999)
- Peak ranking: No. 43 (January 1988)

John Peter Fedorowicz (born September 27, 1958) is an American chess player, coach, and writer from The Bronx, New York.

== Chess career ==
Fedorowicz learned to play chess in 1972, inspired by the Fischer–Spassky World Championship Match coverage on TV and as an enthusiastic youngster, made rapid progress to become co-winner of the 1977 U.S. Junior Championship (with Kenneth W. Regan) and outright winner in 1978.

Fedorowicz continued to impress and in 1984 tied for third place in the U.S. Championships, tied for second place at Hastings in 1984–85, and tied for second place at Dortmund in 1986. He represented the U.S. at the 1986 Dubai Chess Olympiad and scored well, earning himself the Grandmaster (GM) title the same year.

Since becoming a grandmaster, he has established himself as one of the leading players from United States, chalking up victories at Cannes 1987 and Sesimbra 1987. He has also won open tournaments, including the 1989 New York Open, the U.S. Open, and the World Open in Philadelphia. At Stockholm in 1990, he finished second to Alexei Shirov.

Fedorowicz has captained the U.S. Olympiad team on two occasions and has frequently acted as a second to World Championship candidate Gata Kamsky. He has written or co-written a number of chess books and many articles for magazines and on-line publishers. He has been an instructor at the Castle Chess Camp in Atlanta, GA since 2004.

As an active 'New Yorker', he spends much of his time in the community, teaching chess to children, giving private lessons, and attending chess camps.

== Books ==
- Fedorowicz, John (1990). The Complete Benko Gambit. Summit. ISBN 978-0945806141.
- Fedorowicz, John; de Firmian, Nick (2004). The English Attack. Sterling. ISBN 978-0945806141.
