= Aleksander Wojtkiewicz =

Polish chess grandmaster (1963–2006)

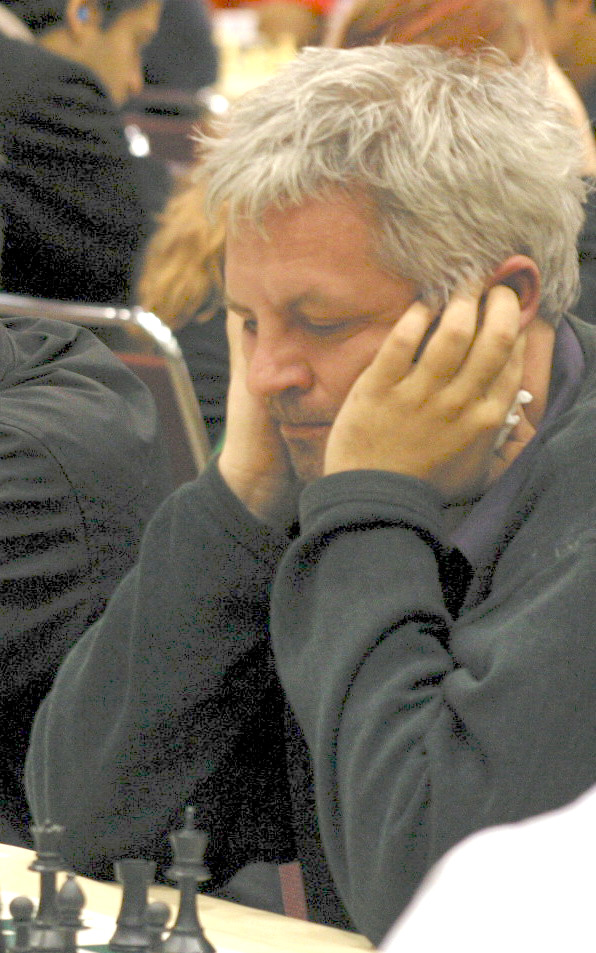
- Wojtkiewicz in 2005

Personal information
- Born: January 15, 1963 Riga, Latvian SSR, Soviet Union
- Died: July 14, 2006 (aged 43) Baltimore, Maryland, U.S.

Chess career
- Country: Soviet Union (until 1989); Poland (1989–2002); United States (2002–2006)
- Title: Grandmaster (1990)
- Peak rating: 2595 (July 1998)

Aleksander Wojtkiewicz (Latvian: Aleksandrs Voitkevičs; January 15, 1963 – July 14, 2006) was a Polish chess grandmaster.

== Life ==
Wojtkiewicz was born in the Latvian SSR. By his early teens, he was already a strong player, and was a student of the former world champion Mikhail Tal, whom he assisted in the 1979 Interzonal tournament in Riga. He won the Latvian Chess Championship in 1981.

His promising chess career was interrupted when he refused to join the Soviet Army. For several years, he went undercover, but in 1986 he was sentenced to two years in prison. After one year, he received an amnesty after the meeting of Presidents Ronald Reagan and Mikhail Gorbachev. Following his release he moved from Riga to Warsaw, where he won two Polish Chess Championships. He played for Poland in the Chess Olympiads of 1990 and 1992.

He later resided in the United States, where he became one of the most active players on the tournament circuit, constantly flying around the world. Several times he won the annual $10,000 first prize for Grand Prix chess tournaments in the United States. In 2000 and 2002, he tied for first place at the U.S. Masters Chess Championship, and in 2004 he played in the FIDE World Chess Championship. In his final months, he tied for first at the 2006 World Open in Philadelphia and won the 2006 National Open in Las Vegas.

He died on the evening of 14 July 2006 from a perforated intestine and massive bleeding.

Buried in the Ziepniekkalns Cemetery in Riga.

== Playing style ==
Wojtkiewicz's strategies have been investigated in the online series "How Wojo Won" by chess master Jonathan Hilton. The six-part series began in December 2006 and continued until April 2008. Hilton has also co-authored a book, Wojo's Weapons: Winning with White, Volume I, focusing on Wojtkiewicz's opening play.

== Notable games ==
- Aleksander Wojtkiewicz vs Robert Kuczynski, Biel 1990, Slav Defense: Modern Line (D11), 1-0
- Aleksander Wojtkiewicz vs Spyridon Skembris, Novi Sad 50/521 1990, English Opening: Agincourt Defense, Catalan Defense (A13), 1-0
- Aleksander Wojtkiewicz vs David Filipovich, 29th World Open 2001, Queen Pawn Game: Symmetrical Variation (D02), 1-0
- Jennifer Shahade vs Aleksander Wojtkiewicz, 114th New York Masters 2004, Sicilian Defense: Hyperaccelerated Dragon (B35), 0-1
