= Bernard Zuckerman =

American chess player (born 1943)

Personal information
- Born: March 31, 1943 (age 83) Brooklyn, New York

Chess career
- Country: United States
- Title: International Master (1970)
- FIDE rating: 2455 (September 2026)
- Peak rating: 2490 (January 1984)

Bernard Zuckerman (born March 31, 1943) is an International Master of chess.

Zuckerman competed in seven U.S. Chess Championships (1965, 1966, 1968, 1969, 1974, 1977 and 1978), his best result being a tie for fourth place with William Addison in 1965. He served as a member of the U.S. team in the World Student Team Championships of 1964, 1967 and 1969. At Brooklyn College, Zuckerman was a prominent player, along with Raymond Weinstein, on its national champion college chess team.

For more than forty years, Zuckerman was a well-known authority on chess openings. For that reason, he was nicknamed "Zook the book".
