= Women in chess =

Women's participation in chess

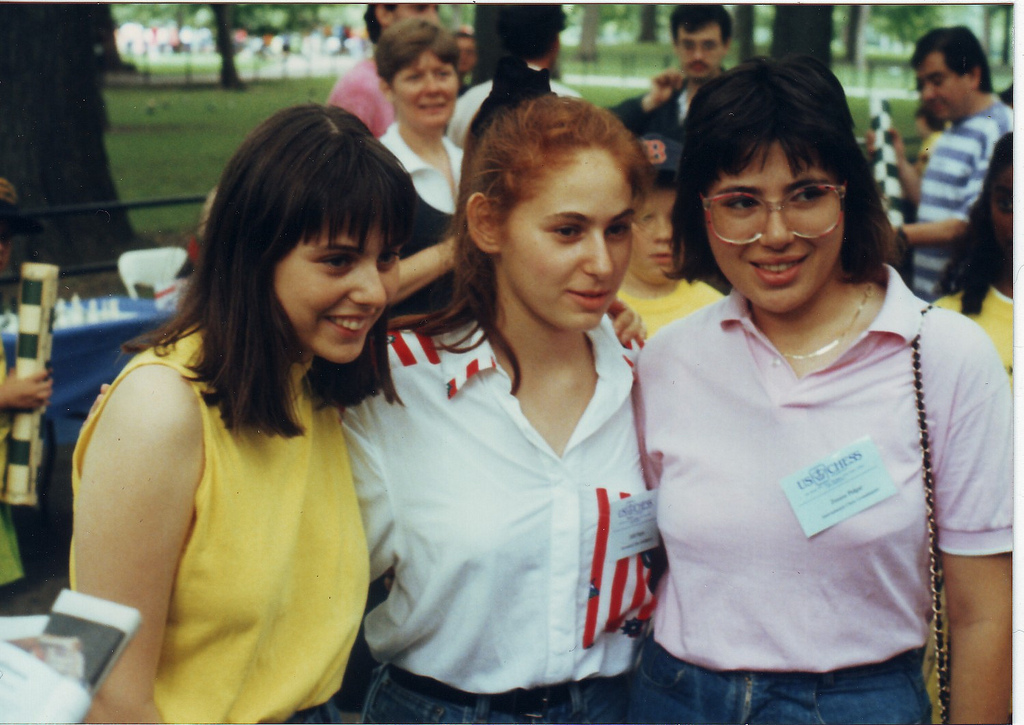
The Polgár sisters (pictured in 1988; left to right Sofia, Judit, and Susan) ushered in the modern era of women's chess.

Women represent a small minority of chess players at all ages and levels. Female chess players today generally compete in a mix of open tournaments and women's tournaments, the latter of which are most prominent at or near the top level of women's chess and at youth levels. Modern top-level women's tournaments help provide a means for some participants to be full-time professional chess players. The majority of these tournaments are organized by the International Chess Federation (FIDE) and revolve around the World Championship cycle, which culminates in a match to decide the Women's World Chess Champion. Beyond those events, among the most prominent women's tournaments are women's and girls' national and continental championships.

Women were generally not permitted to join chess clubs until the early 1900s. Once allowed in, they were largely limited to competing against other women. Around this time, Vera Menchik became the inaugural Women's World Chess Champion and was the first woman to compete in top-level tournaments with the best players in the world in the late 1920s. After her death, the Soviet Union dominated women's chess, winning every Women's Chess Olympiad they played from its inception in 1957 through 1986. Soviet players Nona Gaprindashvili and Maia Chiburdanidze from Georgia became the first two women to earn the Grandmaster (GM) title, and were the next two women after Menchik to compete in high-level open tournaments.

The Polgar sisters ended Soviet domination of women's chess as Susan Polgar became No. 1 in the world among women in 1984 and all three led Hungary to a gold medal at the 1988 Olympiad. Judit Polgar established herself as the strongest women's chess player of all time, reaching No. 8 in the world overall. The turn of the century saw a substantial increase in the number of women to earn the GM title. Among these new GMs, Hou Yifan has been the only other woman to reach the overall top 100 and regularly compete in high-level open tournaments. Since the 1990s, China has dominated the Women's World Championship with six different champions, including the reigning champion Ju Wenjun.

The low number of women to reach the top level of chess has created a lot of interest as to why women historically have not had more success. There is no evidence that women are innately disadvantaged at chess. It has been demonstrated statistically that the low numbers across all levels can largely account for the lack of women at or near the top. The general paucity of women in chess has contributed to women commonly being the subject of sexism, harassment, and sexual harassment, factors also thought to contribute to women achieving less or leaving chess early. Beyond playing chess, women also take on other roles such as being a coach or an arbiter. Two chess professions with a smaller participation gap are commentators and live streamers.

== Competition formats ==
=== General structure ===
With respect to gender, chess tournaments can be classified as either open or women's tournaments. (Note: The term "open" in chess can refer to either a tournament with no restrictions by gender or a Swiss tournament. Many Swiss "open" tournaments are also "open" by gender.) Women can choose to compete in either open or women's tournaments. In practice, most if not all female players play a mix of both. The fraction of participants who are women can vary considerably depending on the type of tournament. Independently organized tournaments tend to feature higher percentages of female chess players than championship tournaments organized by federations. Many smaller tournaments across a wide range of levels do not have any female participants.

One of the most common types of chess tournaments are Swiss open tournaments, which both men and women can enter as they generally allow a large if not unlimited number of participants. On some occasions, these tournaments are split into multiple sections by rating. Swiss tournaments tend to not have a women-only section, although it is possible that one of the rating sections may be restricted to women. Instead of having a separate women-only section, many professional and semi-professional Swiss tournaments have women's prizes reserved for the highest-finishing women in the open sections.

Another common type of tournament are closed round-robin tournaments, which tend to have around ten players. These tournaments are very popular at highest level of chess, and include events such as the Sinquefield Cup. Although there are no formal restrictions by gender, many such elite tournaments tend to only have male players because the event is invite-only and only high-rated players receive invitations. Judit Polgár and Hou Yifan are generally considered the only players to regularly play in these elite highest-level tournaments this century. Female chess players have corresponding elite women-only round-robin events such as the Cairns Cup. There are a limited number of elite women-only round-robin classical tournaments.

=== Championship tournaments ===
Tournaments can either be independent or some sort of championship tournament organized by FIDE, continental federations, or national federations. These championship tournaments organized by federations often have an open section and a women's section, and they are often held concurrently, such as with the Chess Olympiad and the Women's Chess Olympiad. Because the sections are held together and the top female players have a better chance to medal or win prizes in the women's section, few women participate in the open section. Likewise, nearly all national federations host a national championship and a women's national championship, as well as similar competitions across a wide range of youth levels. Albeit also uncommon, it can be more common for women or girls to participate in the open sections of these events, and more so at youth levels. Some female players have won their country's overall national championship, including grandmasters and international masters such as Judit Polgár, Nino Khurtsidze, Viktorija Čmilytė, Keti Arakhamia-Grant, and Eva Moser.

FIDE began hosting a Women's World Chess Championship in 1927 even before they controlled the overall World Chess Championship. The inaugural edition was won by Vera Menchik. The reigning Women's World Chess Champion is Ju Wenjun, who has won the title four times in a row from 2018 through 2023. The most recent format for the Women's World Championship is a match between the reigning champion and a challenger who earns the right to challenge by winning the Women's Candidates. The Candidates and the rest of the World Championship cycle are analogous to how the overall World Chess Champion is determined.

== Achievements ==
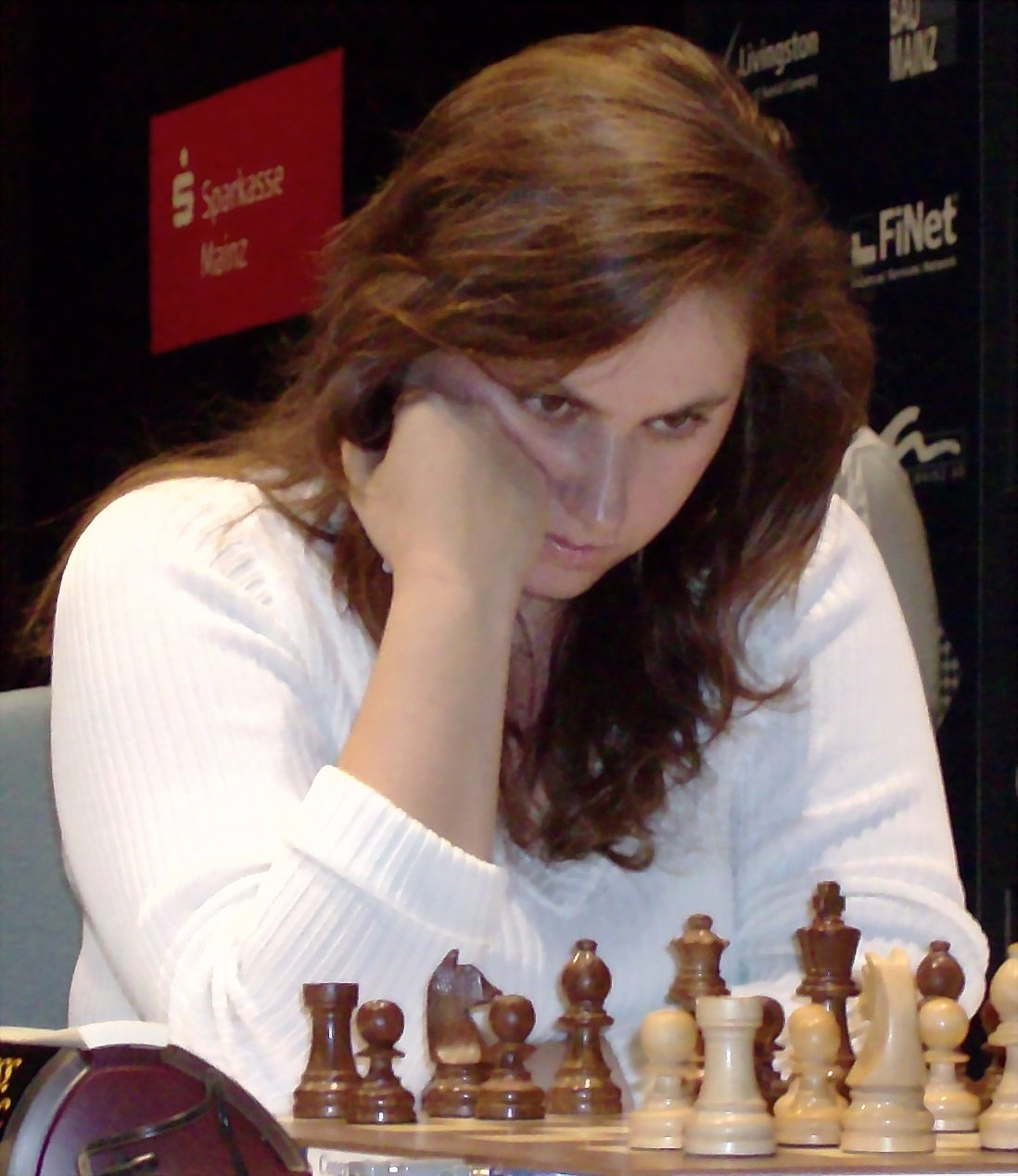
Judit Polgár, 2008

=== Rating ===
Judit Polgár is widely acknowledged as the greatest and strongest female chess player of all-time, and Hou Yifan is widely acknowledged as the next-strongest. In total, three women have been ranked in the top 100 overall: Judit Polgár with a peak ranking of world No. 8, Maia Chiburdanidze with a peak ranking of world No. 43, and Hou Yifan with a peak ranking of world No. 55. Other women who have been ranked in the top 200 include Susan Polgar, Pia Cramling, Xie Jun, Alisa Galliamova, Humpy Koneru, and Anna Muzychuk. For players who were active before official ratings began, the retrospective rating site Chessmetrics also considered Vera Menchik to have been among the top 100 players in the world for several years, informally estimating her peak ranking at No. 52 in the world.

Judit Polgár is also the only woman who has been rated above 2700 – informally called the "super GM" level – with a peak rating of 2735, a wide margin ahead of anyone else. Hou Yifan has the next-highest peak rating at 2686, also by a wide margin ahead of the next-highest rated player, Humpy Koneru. In total, six women have been rated above 2600, the other three being Aleksandra Goryachkina, Anna Muzychuk, and Ju Wenjun.

=== Titles ===
There are 42 women who have earned the Grandmaster (GM) title, and an additional 148 who have the International Master (IM) title (including seven who are deceased) as of May 2025. China has produced the most GMs with 10. Russia, Georgia, and Ukraine have also had at least 5 GM women. The other countries that have had multiple women with the GM title are India, Hungary, the United States, and the former Soviet Union. There are more than 300 women whose highest title is the Woman Grandmaster (WGM) title. In total, around 500 women have the WGM title, including those who also have either the GM or IM titles. There are around 900 women with the Woman International Master (WIM) title.

=== Tournament performances ===
Many of the best tournament results by women in the highest-level tournaments were achieved by Judit Polgár and Hou Yifan. Judit Polgár came in clear second in the 2003 edition of the Tata Steel 14-player round-robin super-tournament (then known as the Corus chess tournament), which featured seven of the world's top ten players and is generally regarded as the "Wimbledon of Chess". Hou Yifan shared first place and was runner-up after a play-off in the 2012 edition of the Gibraltar Masters, a high-level Swiss tournament in which she defeated four of the eleven players in the field rated at least 2700, including Judit Polgár.

The best tournament performances in classical tournaments include Judit Polgár sharing first place with Shakhriyar Mamedyarov in the 2006 Hoogeveen Crown Group, a four-player double round-robin, with a 2930 tournament performance rating (TPR). Hou Yifan had a 2872 TPR with her shared-first in the Swiss-format Gibraltar in 2012. When Judit's older sister Sofia Polgar won the 1989 Magistrale di Roma with a near-perfect score of 8½/9, she had a 2926 TPR against her rated opposition, which included five GMs. In ten-player round-robin super-tournaments, Judit Polgár had a 2845 TPR when she won the 1994 Madrid Torneo Magistral, and a 2790 TPR when she won the 2000 Japfa Classic in Bali. More recently, Hou Yifan won the 2017 Biel GMT ten-player super-tournament, which featured three players rated over 2700, with a 2810 TPR.

In rapid, Valentina Gunina won the 2016 London Rapid Superplay, a large Swiss with 43 GMs and 475 players total, with a 2870 TPR. In a much smaller rapid event, Judit Polgár won the UNAM Quadrangular four-player knockout, in which she knocked out Vasyl Ivanchuk in the semi-final and Topalov in the final, amounting to a TPR of 2968.

=== Notable games ===
Judit Polgár's most brilliant games include her victory over world No. 2 Alexei Shirov in 1994 in Buenos Aires and her victory over world No. 2 Viswanathan Anand in 1999 in Dos Hermanas. The game against Shirov took place in a tournament in honour of Lev Polugaevsky where players were required to play the Sicilian defence.

The most landmark win by opponent is generally considered to be Judit Polgár's victory over world No. 1 Garry Kasparov in the Russia vs. the Rest of the World rapid match in 2002. The win marked the first time a woman defeated the current world No. 1 player, and it received worldwide attention in the mainstream media. It drew particular attention because of Kasparov's past comments denouncing women's abilities to play chess, and was seen as proof that women were capable of beating even the best player in the world. Polgár's highest-rated wins in classical include two victories over world No. 1 Veselin Topalov, rated 2813, in the 2006 Hoogeveen Crown Group, where she shared first place. Hou Yifan defeated world No. 3 Fabiano Caruana, who was rated 2817, in the 2018 Grenke Chess Classic.

== Coaching ==
There are few elite-level female chess coaches, in part owing to how there have only been a little more than 44 female chess players who have achieved the Grandmaster title. Susan Polgar is one of the few prominent high-level female chess coaches, particularly at the Grandmaster level. Polgar has run chess centers and also became one of the leading college chess coaches in the United States. In 2010, as the head coach for the Texas Tech Knight Raiders chess team, Susan Polgar became the first woman to lead a chess team to the Final Four. In April 2011 the Texas Tech Knight Raiders won the President's Cup; this made Polgar the first female head coach to win the national title.

== Research ==
Male chess players greatly outnumber female chess players at all age levels and in the vast majority of tournaments, often by a factor of ten or higher. Analysis of rating statistics of German players in an article from 2009 by Merim Bilalić, Kieran Smallbone, Peter McLeod, and Fernand Gobet indicated that although the highest-rated men were stronger than the highest-rated women, the difference (usually more than 200 rating points) was largely accounted for by the relatively smaller pool of women players (only one-sixteenth of rated German players were women). In 2020, psychologist and neuroscientist Wei Ji Ma summarized the state of research on women in chess as "there is currently zero evidence for biological differences in chess ability between the genders" but added "that does not mean that there are certainly no such differences."

Chess players, both men and women, have speculated on the reasons behind the gap in chess achievements by women compared to men. Some women players believe the major reason is due to cultural expectations and bias. Jennifer Shahade, a FIDE Woman Grandmaster and the women's program director at the United States Chess Federation (USCF), said there is a large drop-off of girls at the USCF around the ages of 12 and 13, which she attributes to the lack of a social network for girls that age in chess. Polgár said that society and some parents may weaken the desire of young female chess players to improve, and that women were often held back by lower ambition by choosing to compete in all-women tournaments rather than open tournaments. Jovanka Houska, an International Master and Woman Grandmaster, argued that overconfidence by boys gives an advantage over girls.

In a 2007 study at the University of Padua, male and female players of similar ability were matched up with each other on online games. When the players were unaware of their opponent's sex and of the study's gender component, female players won slightly under half their games. When female players were told that the study was related to existing research showing superior scores for male players, and that their opponent was male, they played less aggressively, and they won about one in four games. However, when female players were informed of prior research and told that their opponent was female, even though they were actually male, they were as aggressive as the male players and won about one in two games. The researchers argued that gender stereotypes may have led female players to lower their self-esteem and self-confidence when they know they are playing male players, causing them to play defensively which worsened their performance. Attempts to replicate this result with the analysis of chess databases has produced inconsistent results.

== Sexism ==
Polgár, Shahade and Houska have said that they have encountered sexism, including belittling comments about their abilities, opponents who refused to shake hands, and online trolls questioning if girls and women belong in chess.

Several male players have commented negatively on women's performance in chess. In a 1963 interview, Bobby Fischer was dismissive of female players, calling them "terrible" and said it was because "[women] are not so smart". In 2015, Nigel Short argued that male players performed better because men and women were "hard-wired" for different skills, which was met with controversy. In 2022, Ilya Smirin, while broadcasting live during the ninth round of the FIDE Women's Grand Prix 2022–23, said that chess was "maybe not for women", and also praised a woman for playing like a man. FIDE apologized through Twitter and called Smirin's comments embarrassing and offensive. The same day FIDE fired Smirin for making "offensive remarks".

In August 2023, over a hundred female chess players signed a statement on behalf of FIDE against sexism and sexual abuse in chess. That same year, 14 women signed an open letter denouncing sexism and sexist violence in the French chess world.

== Transgender women ==
In 2003, transgender player Annemarie Sylvia Meier won the German Women's Chess Championship.

In August 2023, FIDE attracted heavy criticism for issuing an order banning transgender women from women's competitions. This was seen by many chess players as having no purpose other than to discriminate against transgender women, as unlike physical sports, there are no concerns about biological advantages. American Woman Grandmaster Jennifer Shahade commented "It's obvious they didn't consult with any transgender players in constructing it... I strongly urge FIDE to reverse course on this and start from scratch with better consultants." French transgender player Yosha Iglesias, who has held the title of FIDE Master since 2019 when she was competing as a man, described the new regulations as "unfair, exclusive, and discriminatory", saying they were contrary to the IOC guidelines that FIDE had signed up to. In December 2023 Iglesias fulfilled the requirements for the Woman International Master title, becoming the first openly transgender person to qualify for the title, and FIDE confirmed the title in April 2024.

== History ==
=== Early history and romantic era of chess ===
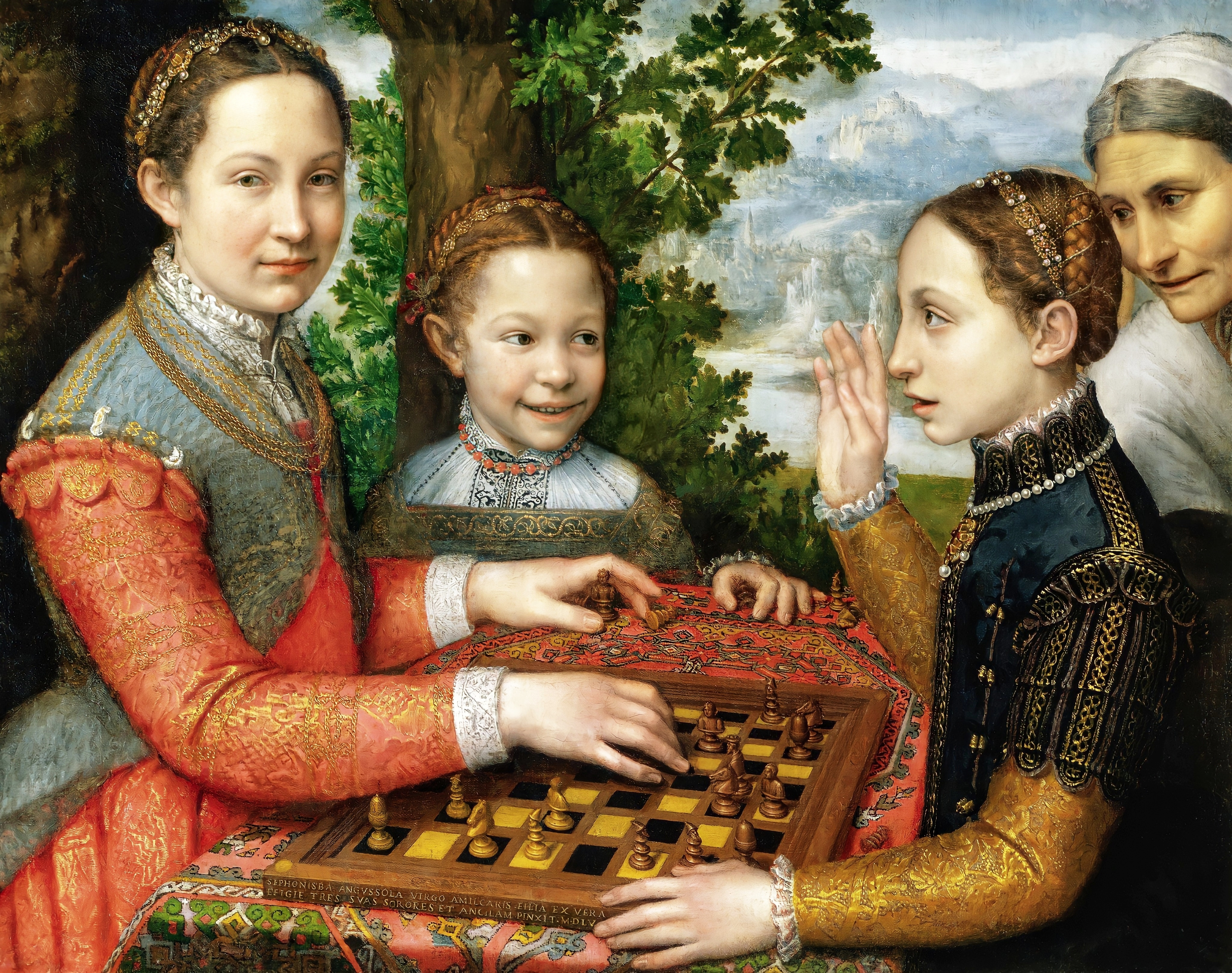
Painting by Sofonisba Anguissola of her sisters playing chess (1555)

In the Middle Ages, Macalda di Scaletta played chess, and historical evidence suggests that she was probably the first person in Sicily who learned how to play it. Queen Elizabeth I, who lived from 1533 until 1603, played chess very well, according to a placard in the Tower of London.

Benjamin Franklin, who lived from 1706 until 1790, according to Thomas Jefferson played chess in Paris with socially important women, including the Duchess of Bourbon Bathilde d'Orléans, who was "a chess player of about his force".

=== Milestones and beginning of tournament participation ===
In 1884 the first women's chess tournament was held; it was sponsored by the Sussex Chess Association. In 1897 the first women's international chess tournament was held, which Mary Rudge won. In 1927 the first Women's World Chess Championship was held, which Vera Menchik won.

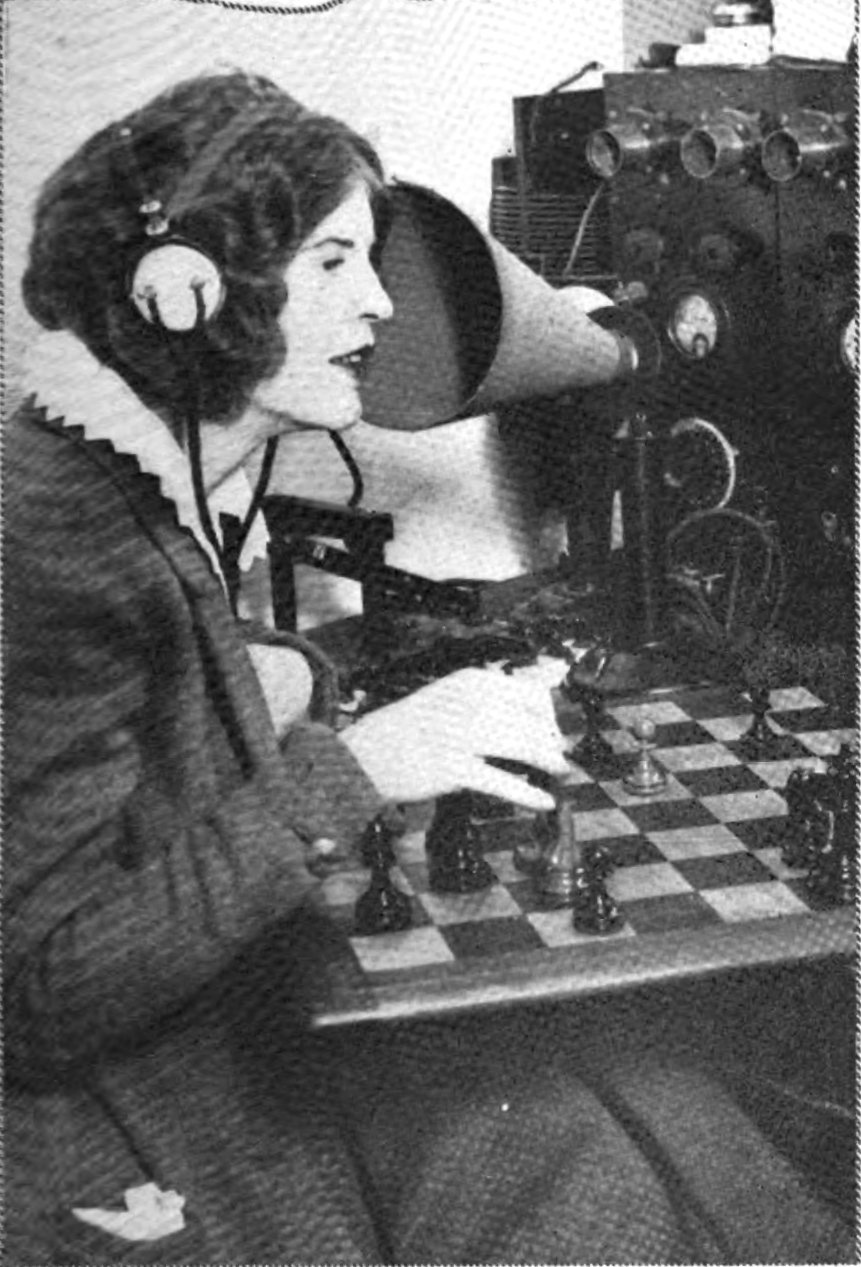
A woman playing chess by radio in 1922

In 1950 Lyudmila Rudenko became the first female International Master.

The first Women's Chess Olympiad was held in 1957 and won by the Soviet Union team.

In 1977 Rohini Khadilkar became the first female player to compete in the Indian Chess Championship. Some players objected to her being in the tournament because she was female. Her father wrote to the World Chess Federation president, Max Euwe, and Euwe ruled that female players could not be barred from open chess events. Also in 1977, Nona Gaprindashvili tied for first place at Lone Pine International; her performance at Lone Pine made her the first woman ever to earn a norm for the title of Grandmaster. In 1978 Nona became the first female Grandmaster, although she did not meet the normal requirement of three norms totaling 24 games. Nona also tied for second at the Dortmund Sparkassen Chess Meeting in 1978.

In 1996 Judit Polgár became the first woman to be ranked in the top ten of all chess players, in 2002 she became the first female chess player to defeat the reigning world number one (Garry Kasparov) in a game, and in 2005 she became the first female player to play for a small-scale World Chess Championship, which she did in the FIDE World Chess Championship 2005; she had previously participated in large, 100+ player knockout tournaments for the world championship, but this was a small 8-player invitational.

=== 21st century and online chess era ===
Recently, Hou Yifan has been the leading female chess player, for example winning the Biel GM tournament in 2017.

In February 2017, the Iranian Chess Federation banned Dorsa Derakhshani from playing for the national team or in national tournaments after she played in the 2017 Gibraltar Chess Festival without wearing a hijab.

The 2015 Women's World Champion, Mariya Muzychuk, and US Women's Champion Nazí Paikidze elected not to attend the Women's World Chess Championship 2017, out of protest at the tournament's location in Iran, where participants were required to wear a hijab in public. In December 2022, Iranian player Sarasadat Khademalsharieh planned not to return to Iran after not wearing a hijab during the FIDE World Rapid and Blitz Chess Championships, amid protests against the Iranian government. In July 2023, she was granted Spanish citizenship, and transferred chess federations from Iran to Spain. Somewhat similarly, at the end of 2017, Anna Muzychuk gained widespread media attention for her decision to boycott the World Rapid and Blitz Championships in Saudi Arabia and forgo the opportunity to defend both of her World Championship titles because of the restrictions Saudi Arabia has in place against women, including those related to women's clothing and the prohibition on women going outside without being accompanied by a man.

In 2021, FIDE announced the largest-yet sponsorship deal for women's chess, with the breast enlargement company Motiva; this move met with both criticism and support from female chess players. FIDE declared 2022 the "Year of Woman in Chess".

== Timeline ==
=== Through the Menchik era ===
- 1866: The earliest-known tournament with a women's prize is held in North Yorkshire, England. (Note: It is unknown if the prize was for the top woman in an open tournament, or if the tournament was exclusively a women's tournament.)
- 1879: Ellen Gilbert wins all four of her games against George H. D. Gossip, one of the strongest correspondence chess players, as part of a team correspondence match between Gilbert's United States and Gossip's England.
- 1897: The first international women's chess tournament is held in London, and was won by leading British women's player Mary Rudge.
- 1922: María Teresa Mora of Cuba becomes the first woman to win her country's overall national championship.
- 1926: Vera Menchik wins the Hastings Major Reserve, a tier below the highest master level, which is regarded as the first high-level tournament victory by a woman.
- 1927: FIDE establishes the Women's World Chess Championship, which was staged in a 12-player round-robin format alongside the 1st Chess Olympiad in London and was won by Vera Menchik.
- 1928: Vera Menchik becomes the first woman to compete in master-level tournaments.
- 1929: Vera Menchik shares second place in Ramsgate with Akiba Rubinstein, earning her regular invites to elite international events over the next decade.
- 1930: Vera Menchik gets her first of two victories over future World Champion Max Euwe in the Hastings Congress.
- 1937: The first Women's World Championship match is privately organized in Austria with recognition from FIDE and contested by the reigning champion Vera Menchik and Sonja Graf.
- 1944: Vera Menchik, then the eight-time reigning Women's World Champion, is killed in a German air raid during the Second World War, leaving the championship vacant.

=== Soviet domination ===
- 1950: Lyudmila Rudenko becomes the new Women's World Chess Champion, ending the interregnum after Menchik's death.
- 1950: FIDE establishes the International Woman Master (WM or IWM) title, the precursor to the modern Woman International Master (WIM) title, as one of their original FIDE titles along with the Grandmaster (GM) and International Master (IM) titles.
- 1950: Lyudmila Rudenko, as Women's World Champion, is the lone woman among the inaugural class of players to receive the International Master (IM) title.
- 1950: Chantal Chaudé de Silans of France becomes the first woman to compete in the Chess Olympiad.
- 1953: FIDE institutes the match format for the Women's World Chess Championship indefinitely, aligning the format with the overall World Chess Championship.
- 1957: The first Women's Chess Olympiad is held in 1957 in the Netherlands and was won by the Soviet Union.
- 1961: Lisa Lane is the first chess player to appear on the cover of Sports Illustrated magazine.
- 1962: Nona Gaprindashvili becomes Women's World Chess Champion and would hold the title for 16 years.
- 1971: Nona Gaprindashvili becomes the women's world No. 1 with the introduction of official FIDE ratings.
- 1972: FIDE begins staging the Chess Olympiad and Women's Chess Olympiad together, starting with the 20th Chess Olympiad and 5th Women's Chess Olympiad in Yugoslavia.
- 1976: FIDE introduces the Woman Grandmaster (WGM) title and re-establishes the IWM title as the Woman International Master (WIM) title.
- 1977: Nona Gaprindashvili becomes the first woman to make a GM norm with a performance over 2600 while sharing first place at the Lone Pine International.
- 1977: Rohini Khadilkar became the first female player to compete in the Indian Chess Championship; some of the other players in the tournament considered trying to have her removed because of her gender, prompting FIDE president Max Euwe to rule that female players could not be barred from open or "men's" tournaments.
- 1978: Maia Chiburdanidze becomes Women's World Chess Champion at age 17, ending Gaprindashvili's long reign and beginning her own 13-year reign.
- 1978: Nona Gaprindashvili becomes the first woman to be awarded the GM title.
- 1978: FIDE introduces the Woman FIDE Master (WFM) and FIDE Master (FM) title.
- 1980: Maia Chiburdanidze becomes the women's world No. 1 at age 18.
- 1983: Pia Cramling and Nana Alexandria become women's world No. 1.
- 1984: Maia Chiburdanidze becomes the first woman to win an elite super-tournament in New Delhi.

=== Rise of the Polgar sisters and China ===
- 1984: Susan Polgar becomes the women's world No. 1 at age 15.
- 1984: Maia Chiburdanidze becomes the second woman to be awarded the GM title.
- 1985: Maia Chiburdanidze wins the Banja Luka super-tournament ahead of predominantly GMs.
- 1987: FIDE decides to raise the FIDE ratings of all women except Susan Polgar by 100 over concerns that their ratings did not represent their strength because they were predominantly playing against other women.
- 1987: Susan Polgar controversially loses her women's world No. 1 ranking as FIDE decided to exclude her from the rating adjustment given to all other women because she played predominantly against men.
- 1987: Maia Chiburdanidze becomes the first woman to be ranked in the top 100 overall.
- 1988: Judit Polgár wins the boys' U-12 World Youth Championship, making her the first and only girl to win a boys' World Youth title, and the first of two she would win.
- 1988: Hungary – led by the three Polgar sisters – wins gold at the Women's Chess Olympiad, marking the first time the Soviet Union did not win in 11 appearances over 31 years.
- 1988: Sofia Polgar wins the Magistrale di Roma with a near-perfect score of 8½/9 against mostly GMs, a historic performance known as the "Sack of Rome".
- 1989: Judit Polgár becomes the second woman to be ranked in the top 100 overall at age 12.
- 1991: Susan Polgar becomes the first woman to be earn the GM title through three GM norms from tournament play, the modern way to obtain the title. (Note: , FIDE decided to award Gaprindashvili the GM title after her lone norm at Lone Pine. Chiburdanidze had been awarded the title as a three-time Women's World Champion.)
- 1991: Xie Jun of China becomes the first Asian woman to win the Women's World Chess Championship, ending Chiburdanidze's long reign.
- 1991: Judit Polgár breaks Bobby Fischer's record and becomes the youngest GM in history at age 15 years and 4 months, making her final norm in the Hungarian Championship, which she won.
- 1992: Susan Polgar wins the inaugural Women's World Rapid Championship and Women's World Blitz Championship, the lone edition of these tournaments for 20 years, ahead of her sister Judit.
- 1992: The privately organized Women–Veterans chess tournament is held for the first time, and would continue annually for a decade.
- 1993: Susan Polgar controversially loses the 1992–93 Women's Candidates final to Nana Ioseliani on a drawing of lots as the final tiebreak.
- 1993: Judit Polgár is the first woman to reach a rating of 2600 at age 16.
- 1993: Judit Polgár becomes the first woman to compete in a FIDE Interzonal, which historically was the main qualifying tournament to determines who plays in the Candidates. (Note: Amidst the FIDE-PCA split, this particular edition of the Interzonals instead determined who would play in a 13-player knock-out directly for the World Championship, which was in effect a Candidates tournament that included the defending World Champion.)
- 1993: Xie Jun defends her Women's World Chess Championship title, and in doing so became the first woman from Asia to earn the Grandmaster title.
- 1996: Judit Polgár becomes the first woman to be ranked in the top 10 overall at age 19.
- 1996: Susan Polgar becomes Women's World Chess Champion, completing her career triple crown.
- 1997: Judit Polgár becomes the first woman to compete in a FIDE World Championship, which was being held in a large knock-out format for the first time with a field of 100 players.
- 1998: Alisa Galliamova, the winner of the round-robin stage of the 1997 Women's Candidates, forfeits the Candidates final to round-robin runner-up Xie Jun after refusing to play the match entirely in her opponent's home country.
- 1999: FIDE declares Susan Polgar's World Championship title to be forfeited amidst her concerns about the timing of the next match coinciding with Polgar's pregnancy and likewise being against staging the match entirely in her opponent's home country.
- 1999: Judit Polgár reaches the quarter-finals of the knock-out open FIDE World Championship, where she lost to the eventual champion Alexander Khalifman.
- 2000: The inaugural European Individual Chess Championships are held for both the women's and open tournaments.
- 2000: FIDE institutes a 64-player knockout format for the Women's World Chess Championship, and the inaugural knockout edition is won by reigning champion Xie Jun.
- 2002: FIDE introduces the Woman Candidate Master (WCM) and Candidate Master (CM) titles.
- 2002: Zhu Chen won a rapid game against Ruslan Ponomariov in the inaugural FIDE Grand Prix, marking the first time the reigning Women's World Champion defeated the reigning FIDE World Champion.
- 2002: Humpy Koneru breaks Judit Polgár's record as the youngest woman to earn the GM title.
- 2002: Judit Polgár beats Garry Kasparov during the Russia vs. World rapid match, making her the first woman to defeat a current world No. 1 player.
- 2003: Judit Polgár is the first woman to reach a rating of 2700.
- 2003: The first privately organized women's super-tournament, the North Urals Cup, is held in Krasnoturinsk, Russia and would continue annually for six editions.
- 2004: Alexandra Kosteniuk of Russia becomes the 10th woman with the GM title.
- 2005: Susan Polgar regains her spot as the active women's world No. 1, ending her sister Judit's more-than-15-year reign as women's world No. 1 as she took a hiatus due to her pregnancy.
- 2005: Judit Polgár competes in the eight-player double-round-robin FIDE World Championship.
- 2006: Judit Polgár beats Veselin Topalov twice in the Hoogeveen Crown Group, making her the first and only woman to defeat a current world No. 1 in classical, as well as the first to defeat a player rated over 2800.
- 2007: Judit Polgár becomes the first woman to compete in the Candidates.
- 2007: Susan Polgar founds the SPICE Institute, which would become the most successful college chess program in the United States.
- 2007: Humpy Koneru is the second woman to reach a rating of 2600.

=== Chinese domination continues ===
- 2008: FIDE controversially stages the knock-out Women's World Chess Championship in Nalchik, Russia, which was regarded as unsafe amidst the Russo-Georgian War that same month.
- 2008: The Atatürk Women Masters, one of the earliest women's super-tournaments, is staged as a privately organized event in Turkey for the first and only time before becoming a part of the FIDE Women's Grand Prix.
- 2008: Hou Yifan breaks Humpy Koneru's record as the youngest woman to earn the GM title, becoming the first and only woman to accomplish that feat at age 14.
- 2008: Ketevan Arakhamia-Grant of Scotland becomes the 20th woman with the GM title.
- 2009: FIDE launches the first FIDE Women's Grand Prix series, a counterpart to the open FIDE Grand Prix that began a year earlier.
- 2011: Hou Yifan is the third woman to reach a rating of 2600.
- 2011: FIDE re-institutes the match format for the Women's World Championship on an alternating basis with the knockout tournaments.
- 2012: Anna Muzychuk is the fourth woman to reach a rating of 2600.
- 2012: FIDE resumes the World Rapid and Blitz Championships for both the women's and open events.
- 2012: Susan Polgar moves the SPICE Institute from Texas Tech University to Webster University.
- 2013: Valentina Gunina of Russia becomes the 30th woman with the GM title.
- 2013: Irina Krush of the United States becomes the first woman to earn the GM title while not representing Europe or Asia.
- 2014: Hou Yifan becomes the third woman to be ranked in the top 100 overall.
- 2014: Judit Polgár retires from competitive chess.
- 2015: Hou Yifan becomes the women's world No. 1 at age 21.
- 2016: Anna Muzychuk wins the Women's World Rapid Championship and Women's World Blitz Championship in the same year.
- 2017: FIDE controversially stages the knock-out Women's World Chess Championship in Iran, where among other concerns players had to abide by the country's dress code to wear a hijab.
- 2017: Ju Wenjun is the fifth woman to reach a rating of 2600.
- 2017: Hou Yifan beats world No. 3 Fabiano Caruana in the Grenke Chess Classic, joining Judit Polgár as the only women to defeat players rated over 2800.
- 2017: Hou Yifan wins the Biel Grandmaster Tournament, one of the strongest super-tournament victories in women's chess history.
- 2018: Hou Yifan begins an informal indefinite hiatus, during which she has seldom played competitive events.
- 2019: The Cairns Cup, the privately organized highest-prize-fund women's super-tournament, is held for the first time in St. Louis in the United States.
- 2020: FIDE re-institutes the match format as the sole format for the Women's World Championship, while also reviving the Women's Candidates.
- 2021: Women's World Cup and Women's Grand Swiss are held for the first time.
- 2021: Zhansaya Abdumalik of Kazakhstan becomes the first woman to earn the GM title from Central Asia.
- 2021: Aleksandra Goryachkina is the sixth woman to reach a rating of 2600.
- 2022: Elisabeth Pähtz of Germany becomes the 40th woman with the GM title.
- 2022: The Tata Steel India rapid and blitz tournament introduces a women's event with equal prize money to the men's event, the first major international tournament to do so.
- 2024: At Tata Steel Ju Wenjun makes a draw with Ding Liren, marking the first time the reigning Women's World Champion has drawn a game against the reigning World Champion in classical, and defeats world no.6 Alireza Firouzja.
- 2024: Norway Chess introduces a women's event with equal prize money to the open event, the first major classical international tournament to do so.
- 2024: Ju Wenjun completes her career triple crown by winning the Women's World Blitz Championship.
- 2025: Ju Wenjun defeats Tan Zhongyi to win her 5th Women's World Championship, tying Nona Gaprindashvili and Maia Chiburdanidze for the most since Vera Menchik at 8.

== Culture ==
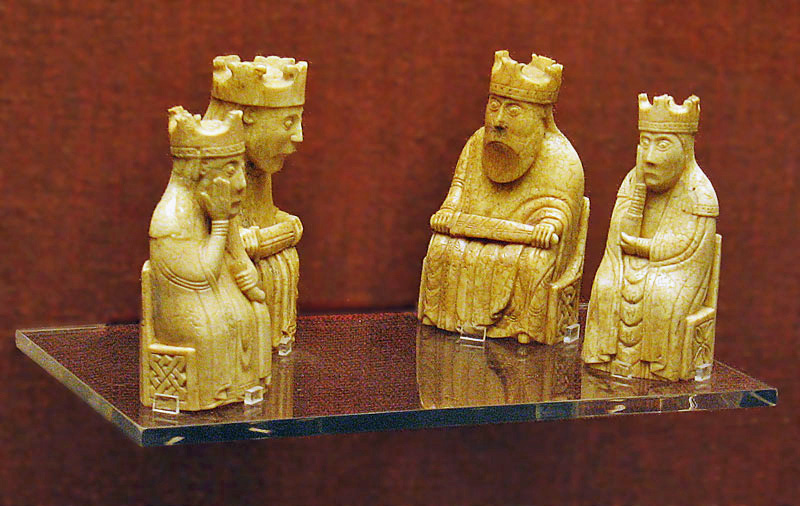
The Lewis chessmen in the British Museum

Margret the Adroit may have made the 12th-century Lewis chessmen. In 2010 at a conference at the National Museum of Scotland on the Lewis chessmen, Gudmundur Thorarinsson (a civil engineer and a former member of the Icelandic Parliament) and Einar S. Einarsson (a former president of Visa Iceland and a friend of the chess champion Bobby Fischer) argued that Margret the Adroit made them. It is a claim that the American author Nancy Marie Brown supports in her 2015 book, Ivory Vikings, the Mystery of the Most Famous Chessmen in the World and the Woman Who Made Them.

Caïssa ("Ka-ee-sah") is a fictional (anachronistic) Thracian dryad portrayed as the goddess of chess. She was first mentioned during the Renaissance by Italian poet Hieronymus Vida.

Historically chess has had many variants. In chess today the queen is the name of the most powerful chess piece. Historian Marilyn Yalom has argued that the queen was able to become the most dangerous piece on the board in the late 15th century because of the example of powerful female rulers in that era of European history.

== See also ==
- List of female chess grandmasters
- List of female chess players
- List of female winners of open chess tournaments
- The Queen's Gambit, 2020 miniseries
- Women's chess in Australia
