= List of female winners of open chess tournaments =

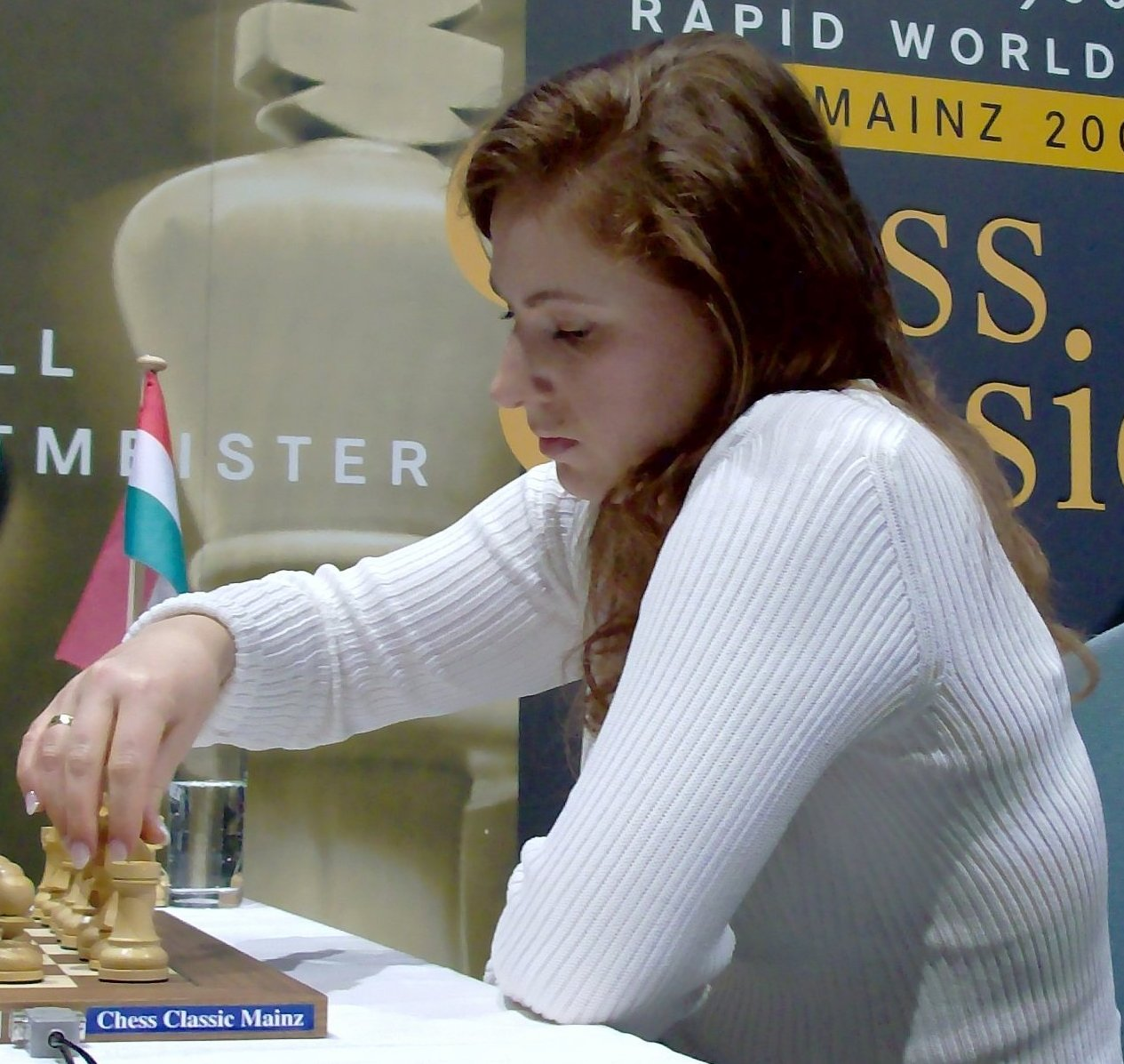
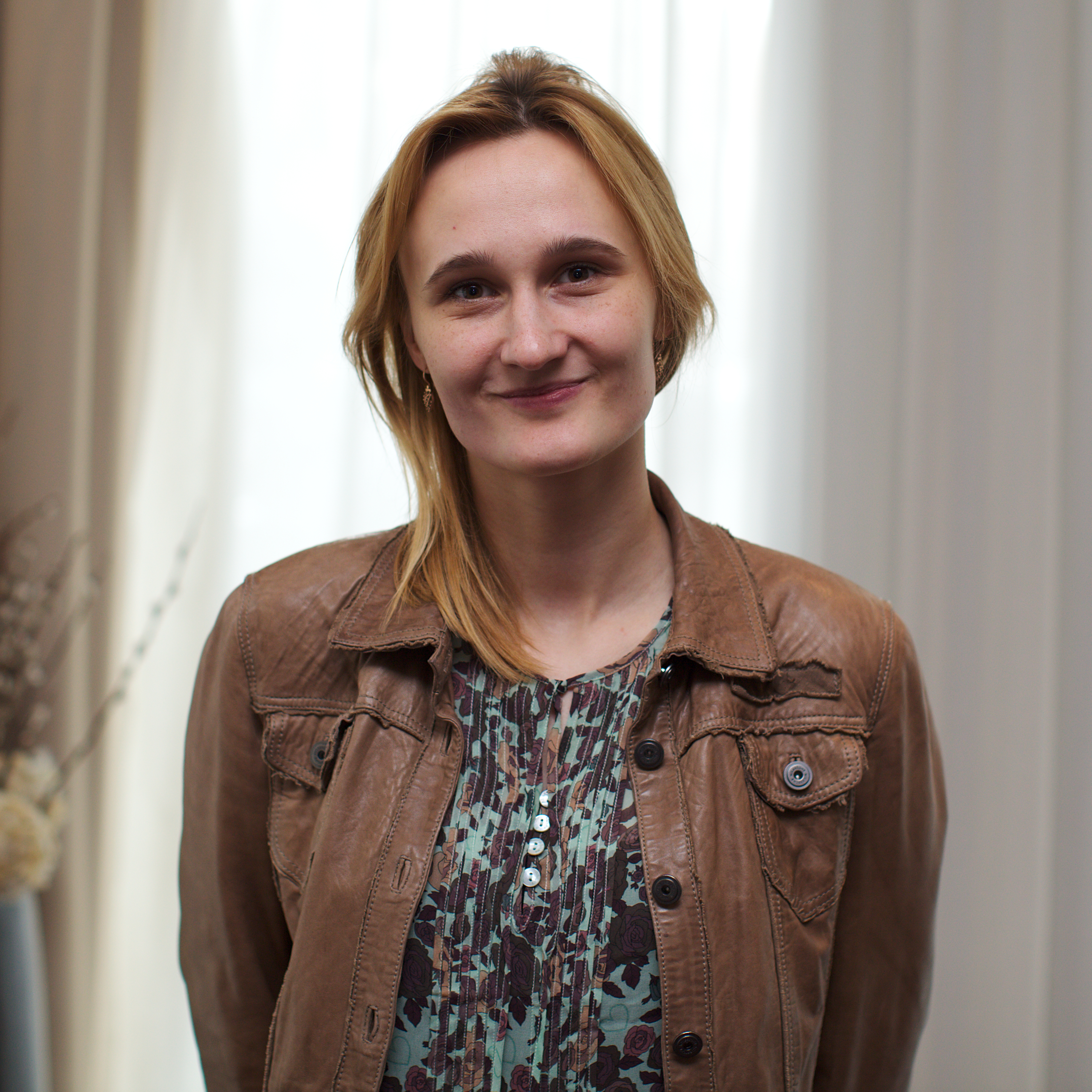
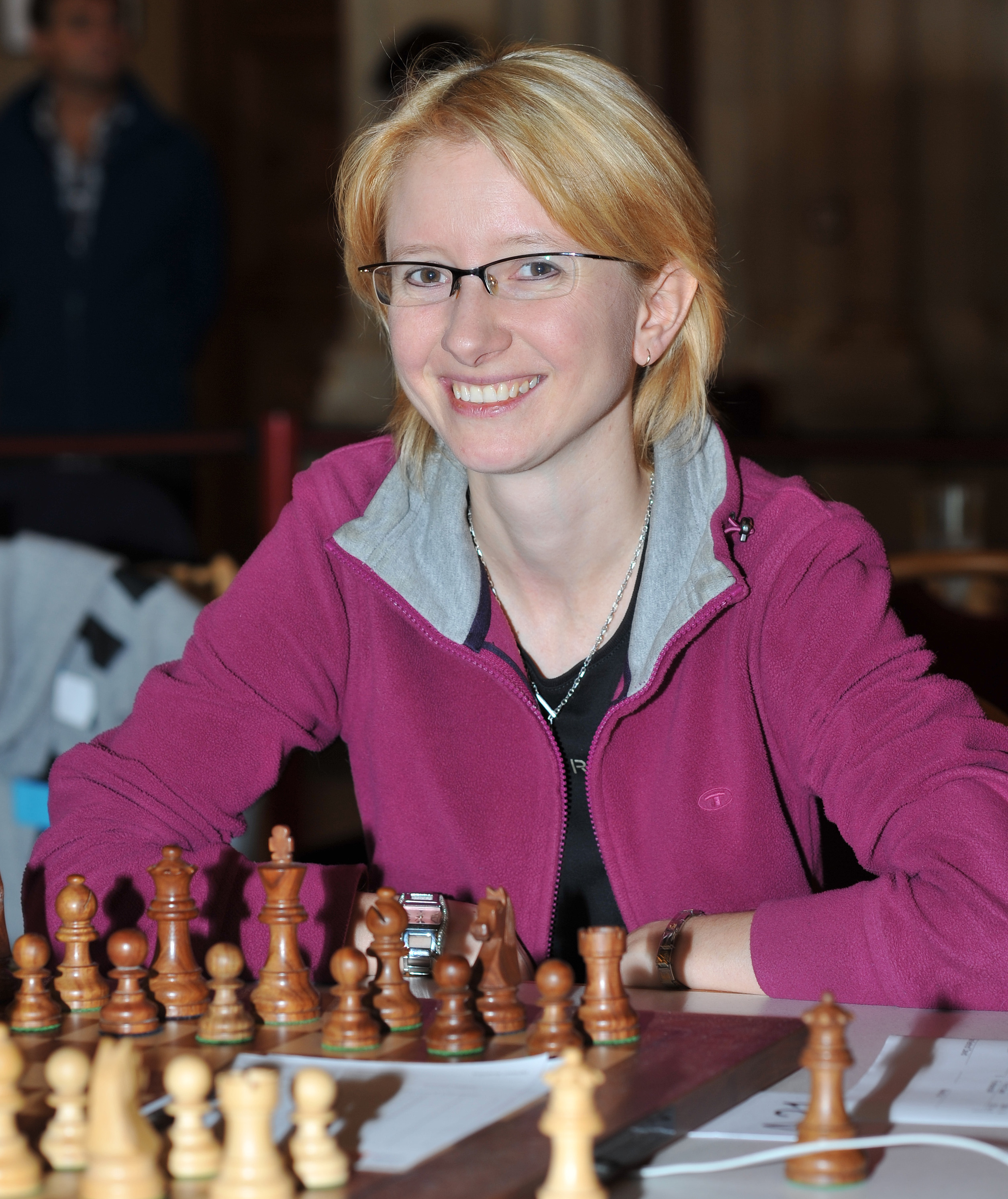
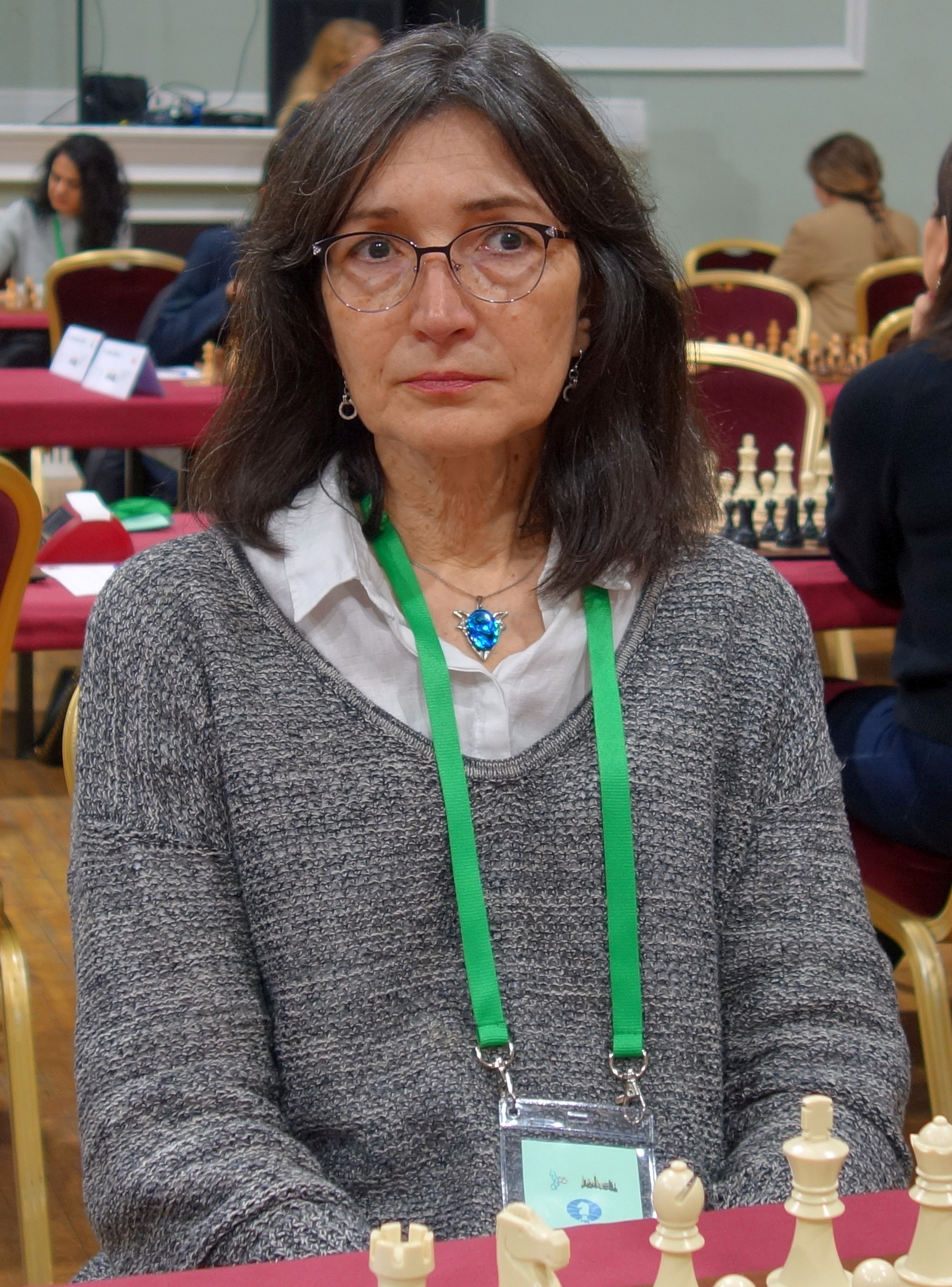
Judit Polgár (top left), Viktorija Čmilytė (top right), Eva Moser (bottom left), and Ketevan Arakhamia-Grant (bottom right) have all won their country's overall national championship.

Female chess players in the modern era generally compete in a mix of open and women's tournaments. With women representing a low fraction of all chess players throughout history, it has been uncommon for women to win open tournaments where women and men are mixed together, particularly at the higher levels. Championship tournaments, both at adult and youth levels, are even rarer for women to win in part because women and men are typically divided into different sections at these events, heavily reducing the number of female players competing against male players.

María Teresa Mora was among the first notable instances of a woman winning an open tournament, becoming Cuban national champion in 1922. Mora was the only student of José Raúl Capablanca, the World Champion at the time. Vera Menchik's 1926 victory at the Hastings Major Reserve, a tier below the highest master level, is regarded as the first high-level tournament victory by a woman. Nona Gaprindashvili is credited with the first elite tournament victory by a woman, winning the Lone Pine International more than 50 years later in 1977. It was this victory that led her to become the first woman to earn the Grandmaster (GM) title a year later. The next Women's World Champion, Maia Chiburdanidze, was the first woman to win an elite round-robin tournament, winning two in the mid-1980s. Her second such victory, in Banja Luka, was mostly against other GMs.

Judit Polgár, widely acknowledged as the greatest female chess player in history, has won the most high-level open tournaments among women by far. Some of her strongest victories in classical came in the four-player double round-robin Crown division in Hoogeveen, where she won four times and regularly faced competition averaging near or above 2700-level. The strongest ten-player elite round-robin tournaments (known as super-tournaments) won by women were the 1994 Madrid Torneo Magistral and 2000 Japfa Classic in Bali by Judit Polgár, and the 2017 Biel Grandmaster Tournament by Hou Yifan. All of these tournaments featured opposition above 2600-level on average. The biggest and strongest Swiss tournament victory by a woman was the 2016 London Rapid Superplay in which Valentina Gunina claimed the title in a field of 475 players, facing an opposition rated over 2500 on average. In classical Swiss events, Gaprindashvili's 1977 success at Lone Pine and Sofia Polgar's 1989 "Sack of Rome", in which she scored 8½/9 against mostly GMs at age 14, are the strongest and most notable victories.

The only two world championships won by women were both by Judit Polgár, who was the 1988 U-12 World Youth Champion and the 1990 U-14 World Youth Champion. Humpy Koneru was the U-12 Asian Youth Champion in 1999. At adult levels, the highest-level national championships won by women were the 1991 Hungarian national championship by Judit Polgár, the 2000 Lithuanian national championship by Viktorija Čmilytė, and the 2006 Austrian national championship by Eva Moser. Ketevan Arakhamia-Grant, the oldest woman to earn the GM title, has won the Scottish national championship three times.

== Key ==
Header key
Header	Explanation
Player	Winner's name
Rtg	Winner's FIDE rating for the event. Cases with no applicable FIDE rating are italicized and classical ratings are substituted.
Tournament	Tournament name
G	Game time control (C = classical, R = rapid, B = blitz, O = online)
Date	Month that the tournament finished
Prize	Prize received by the winner
Fmt	Tournament format (RR = round-robin, D-RR = double RR, Sch = Scheveningen team, KO = knock-out)
Ch	Is the event a championship at national, continental, or world level? (Y = yes at adult level, U = yes at youth level, N = no)
Pts	Winner's score
Rds	Rounds in tournament (played by the winner)
Opp	Average rating of the opponents
#	Number of players in the tournament
=	Was first place shared? (Y = shared (Note: The tie was not broken with tiebreaks or a play-off. (If a player shared first but did not win the event because of tie-breaks, it is not listed.)), N = either sole first, or a tie for first was broken with tiebreaks or play-off)
Ref	Main reference

== Criteria for inclusion ==
Only notable instances are listed.

- For RR tournaments, opponents' average rating must be above 2300. (Note: 2300 is chosen to indicate WGM level.) IM norm tournaments are not listed. GM norm tournaments are only listed if a GM norm was made.
- For Swiss tournaments, opponents' average rating must be above 2200. (Note: The cutoff is lower for Swiss tournaments because the early rounds of Swiss tournaments can typically have much lower-rated opponents.)
- Any youth, senior, or overall championship (national, continental, or world) with rated players won by a WGM, IM, or GM (current or future) may be listed.
- Instances that come close to the above criteria may also be listed.
- Instances that have historical significance or receive significant media coverage for high-level-chess-related reasons may also be listed.

== Notable winners ==
Player	Rtg	Tournament	G	Date	Prize	Fmt	Ch	Pts	Rds	Opp	#	=	Ref
María Teresa Mora (CUB)	N/A	Cuban Championship	C	1922	?	?	Y	?	?	N/A	?	?	
Vera Menchik (TCH)	N/A	Hastings Major Reserve	C	Dec 1926	?	RR	N	6½	9	N/A	10	Y	
Vera Menchik (TCH)	N/A	British CF Major Open	C	Aug 1931	?	RR	N	9	11	N/A	12	N	
Nona Gaprindashvili (USSR)	N/A	Hastings Challengers	C	Jan 1964	?	RR	N	6½	9	N/A	10	N	
Nona Gaprindashvili (USSR)	2430	Lone Pine International	C	Mar 1977	$5750	Swiss	N	6½	9	2450	48	Y	
Maia Chiburdanidze (USSR)	2385	New Delhi Bhilwara IGM	C	Feb 1984	?	RR	N	7½	11	2409	12	N	
Maia Chiburdanidze (USSR)	2400	Banja Luka International	C	Apr 1985	?	RR	N	8½	13	2459	14	N	
Judit Polgár (HUN)	2365	World Youth CC U-12	C	Jul 1988	N/A	Swiss	U	9	11	N/A	37	N	
Judit Polgár (HUN)	2365	London Duncan Lawrie Mixed	C	Oct 1988	?	RR	N	7	9	2339	10	N	
Judit Polgár (HUN)	2365	Hastings Challengers	C	Jan 1989	?	Swiss	N	8	10	2359	102	N	
Sofia Polgar (HUN)	2295	Magistrale di Roma	C	Feb 1989	?	Swiss	N	8½	9	2436	?	N	
Susan Polgar (HUN)	2510	León Torneo Magistral	C	Jun 1989	?	RR	N	8	11	2429	12	Y	
Judit Polgár (HUN)	2540	World Youth CC U-14	C	Jul 1990	N/A	Swiss	U	9	11	N/A	42	N	
Judit Polgár (HUN)	2550	Hungarian Championship	C	Dec 1991	?	RR	Y	6	9	2507	10	N	
Judit Polgár (HUN)	2575	Hastings Congress	C	Dec 1992	?	D-RR	N	9	14	2564	8	Y	
Maia Chiburdanidze (GEO)	2510	Women–Veterans Vienna	C	Jun 1993	?	Sch	N	9	12	2488	12	N	
Judit Polgár (HUN)	2630	Madrid Torneo Magistral	C	May 1994	?	RR	N	7	9	2625	10	N	
Judit Polgár (HUN)	2635	Women–Veterans Prague	C	Jul 1995	?	Sch	N	6½	10	2586	10	Y	
Pia Cramling (SWE)	2510	Women–Veterans Prague	C	Jul 1995	?	Sch	N	6½	10	2586	10	Y	
Judit Polgár (HUN)	2630	Isle of Lewis Festival	R	Jul 1995	?	D-RR	N	5	6	2578	4	Y	
Ketevan Arakhamia-Grant (GEO)	2455	Women–Veterans London	C	Aug 1996	?	Sch	N	6½	10	2536	10	Y	
Maia Chiburdanidze (GEO)	2525	Lippstadt Grandmaster	C	Jul 1997	?	RR	N	8½	11	2456	12	N	
Nino Khurtsidze (GEO)	2390	Georgian Championship	C	1998	?	Swiss	Y	?	?	?	?	N	
Judit Polgár (HUN)	2665	US Open Championship	C	Aug 1998	$3750	Swiss	N	8	9	2330	155	Y	
Judit Polgár (HUN)	2665	Hoogeveen Essent Crown	C	Oct 1998	?	D-RR	N	5	6	2563	4	N	
Judit Polgár (HUN)	2671	Hoogeveen Essent Crown	C	Oct 1999	?	D-RR	N	3½	6	2606	4	Y	
Hoang Thanh Trang (VIE)	2453	First Saturday	C	Dec 1999	?	RR	N	9	13	2418	14	N	
Humpy Koneru (IND)	2229	Asian Youth CC U-12	C	Dec 1999	N/A	Swiss	U	?	?	N/A	?	N	
Marie Sebag (FRA)	2193	French Youth CC U-14	C	2000	N/A	?	U	?	?	N/A	?	N	
Viktorija Čmilytė (LTU)	2329	Lithuanian Championship	C	Mar 2000	?	Swiss	Y	6½	9	2421	54	N	
Judit Polgár (HUN)	2658	Bali Japfa Classic	C	Apr 2000	$20000	RR	N	6½	9	2624	10	N	
Judit Polgár (HUN)	2658	Malmo Sigeman & Co	C	May 2000	?	D-RR	N	4	6	2609	4	Y	
Viktorija Čmilytė (LTU)	2433	Wijk aan Zee Corus Reserve	C	Jan 2001	?	Swiss	N	7	9	2396	42	N	
Humpy Koneru (IND)	2311	Hotel Lipa International	C	Jun 2001	?	RR	N	8½	11	2413	12	Y	
Judit Polgár (HUN)	2686	Hoogeveen Essent Crown	C	Oct 2001	?	D-RR	N	3½	6	2639	4	Y	
Humpy Koneru (IND)	2484	Third Saturday	C	Oct 2001	?	RR	N	8½	11	2418	12	Y	
Humpy Koneru (IND)	2486	Elekes Dezso Memorial	C	May 2002	?	RR	N	8	11	2433	12	Y	
Antoaneta Stefanova (BUL)	2497	Surabaya Wismilak International	C	Jul 2002	$2000	RR	N	9½	11	2441	12	N	
Olga Alexandrova (UKR)	2430	Alushta Title Tournament	C	Oct 2002	?	D-RR	N	9½	12	2407	7	Y	
Judit Polgár (HUN)	2685	Benidorm Hotel Bali Stars	R	Nov 2002	?	RR	N	8	11	2554	12	N	
Ketevan Arakhamia-Grant (GEO)	2413	Scottish Championship	C	Apr 2003	£375	Swiss	Y	7	9	2292	18	Y	
Susan Polgar (USA)	2565	US Open Blitz Championship	B	Aug 2003	?	Swiss	N	11	12	?	?	N	
Kateryna Lagno (UKR)	2439	Ukraine Title Tournament	C	Aug 2003	?	D-RR	N	9½	14	2490	8	N	
Humpy Koneru (IND)	2468	Saharanpur Open	C	Oct 2003	$2200	Swiss	N	8	9	2319	478	N	
Judit Polgár (HUN)	2722	Hoogeveen Essent Crown	C	Oct 2003	?	D-RR	N	4	6	2679	4	N	
Svetlana Petrenko (MDA)	2364	Moldova Championship	C	Feb 2005	?	RR	Y	10	13	2307	14	N	
Viktorija Čmilytė (LTU)	2459	Lithuanian Championship	C	May 2005	?	RR	Y	8	11	2387	12	N	
Qiyu Zhou (FIN)	N/A	Finnish Youth CC U-10	C	Jun 2005	N/A	Swiss	U	6	7	N/A	16	N	
Nona Gaprindashvili (GEO)	2318	Haarlem BDO Master	C	Aug 2005	?	RR	N	6½	9	2344	10	N	
Iweta Rajlich (POL)	2421	First Saturday	C	Feb 2006	?	RR	N	8½	12	2423	13	N	
Eva Moser (AUT)	2395	Austrian Championship	C	Sep 2006	?	RR	Y	6	9	2402	10	N	
Subbaraman Vijayalakshmi (IND)	2425	Leonardo di Bona Memorial	C	Apr 2007	?	Swiss	N	6½	9	2459	23	N	
Humpy Koneru (IND)	2575	HSG Open	C	Jun 2007	?	Swiss	N	7½	9	2440	74	N	
Humpy Koneru (IND)	2572	Kaupthing Open	C	Jul 2007	€3000	Swiss	N	7	9	2455	88	N	
Filiz Osmanodja (GER)	1984	German Youth CC U-12	C	May 2008	N/A	Swiss	U	?	?	N/A	?	N	
Eva Moser (AUT)	2397	Jena Schwarzer Bär Cup	C	Feb 2009	?	Swiss	N	7	7	2222	54	N	
Ana Matnadze (GEO)	2414	Open Las Palmas	C	Apr 2009	?	Swiss	N	8½	9	2150	57	N	
Humpy Koneru (IND)	2603	Czech Coal Match	C	Nov 2009	?	Sch	N	5½	8	2564	8	N	
Hou Yifan (CHN)	2570	Kuala Lumpur Open	C	Apr 2010	?	Swiss	N	7½	9	2457	111	N	
Judit Polgár (HUN)	2686	Ajedrez UNAM Quadrangular	R	Nov 2010	?	KO	N	6	8	2775	4	N	
Humpy Koneru (IND)	2600	Czech Coal Match	C	Nov 2010	?	Sch	N	6	8	2464	8	N	
Ketevan Arakhamia-Grant (SCO)	2464	Scottish Championship	C	Jul 2011	£1200	Swiss	Y	7	9	2147	37	N	
Iweta Rajlich (POL)	2422	First Saturday	C	Apr 2012	?	RR	N	7	9	2396	10	N	
Tania Sachdev (IND)	2400	Czech Coal Match	C	Dec 2012	?	Sch	N	6	8	2431	8	N	
Alexandra Kosteniuk (RUS)	2489	Swiss Championship	C	Jul 2013	?	Swiss	Y	6½	9	2277	70	N	
Hou Yifan (CHN)	2673	Corsican Circuit	R	Oct 2014	?	KO	N	10	14	2546	16	N	
Davaademberel Nomin-Erdene (MGL)	2303	Novi Sad Miljo Vujovic Memorial	C	Jul 2015	?	RR	N	7	9	2405	10	N	
Davaademberel Nomin-Erdene (MGL)	2430	Milan Edoardo Crespi Memorial	C	Dec 2015	?	Swiss	N	7½	9	2302	29	N	
Ekaterina Atalik (TUR)	2378	Prague Open	C	Jan 2016	$600	Swiss	N	8	9	2310	171	N	
Davaademberel Nomin-Erdene (MGL)	2468	Novi Sad Hotel Sajam	C	Feb 2016	?	RR	N	7	9	2440	10	N	
Ketevan Arakhamia-Grant (SCO)	2368	Scottish Championship	C	Jul 2016	?	Swiss	Y	7	9	2240	34	N	
Valentina Gunina (RUS)	2491	London Rapid Superplay	R	Dec 2016	£5000	Swiss	N	9	10	2504	475	N	
Hou Yifan (CHN)	2666	Biel GMT	C	Jul 2017	?	RR	N	6½	9	2644	10	N	
Lei Tingjie (CHN)	2531	Sevilla Open	C	Jan 2018	?	Swiss	N	8	9	2279	310	N	
Annie Wang (USA)	2321	Pan-American Junior Champ.	C	Aug 2019	N/A	Swiss	U	7	9	2248	51	N	
Maria Eizaguerri Floris (ESP)	2304	Spanish Youth CC U-18	C	Jul 2021	N/A	Swiss	U	7½	9	2110	189	N	
Eline Roebers (NED)	2173	Brugse Meesters	C	Aug 2021	?	Swiss	N	7½	9	2178	138	N	
Eline Roebers (NED)	2365	Untergrombach Open	C	Jan 2022	€1000	Swiss	N	6½	7	2172	135	N	
Vaishali Rameshbabu (IND)	2411	Heraklion Fischer Memorial	C	May 2022	?	RR	N	7	9	2376	10	N	
Eline Roebers (NED)	2369	Dutch Youth CC U-18	C	May 2022	N/A	Swiss	U	6	7	2078	15	N	
Davaademberel Nomin-Erdene (MGL)	2398	Agria Festival	C	Jul 2022	?	Swiss	N	5	7	2277	57	N	
Sophie Milliet (FRA)	2363	Perpignan Classique U2400	C	Oct 2022	?	Swiss	N	7	7	2155	58	N	
Alexandra Kosteniuk (SUI)	2523	Espot B-Cup	O	Jun 2023	?	KO	N	N/A	N/A	2525	8	N	
Dinara Wagner (GER)	2447	Sportland NRW Cup	C	Jun 2023	?	RR	N	7	9	2418	10	N	
Polina Shuvalova (FIDE)	2506	IM SCC	O	Oct 2023	$5450	RR/KO	N	N/A	N/A	2386	16	N	
Carissa Yip (USA)	2399	North American Junior Champ.	C	Dec 2023	N/A	Swiss	U	8	9	2012	104	N	
Divya Deshmukh (IND)	2440	Sharjah Challengers	C	May 2024	$2000	Swiss	N	7	9	2364	98	N	
Antoaneta Stefanova (BUL)	2417	Rhodes Summer Cup	C	Jun 2024	€2500	Swiss	N	7	9	2241	45	N	
Meruert Kamalidenova (KAZ)	2352	Open Cup of Karaganda	C	Sep 2024	?	RR	N	5½	9	2534	10	N	
Tatiana Dornbusch (MON)	2234	Monaco Championship	C	Feb 2025	?	Swiss	Y	5½	7	2077	24	N	
Hou Yifan (CHN)	2500	Quenza Open	B	Jul 2025	€3000	Swiss	N	8	9	2342	152	N	
Tatev Abrahamyan (USA)	2343	Budapest One Week	C	Aug 2025	N/A	RR	N	7	9	2393	10	N	
Candela Francisco (ARG)	2225	Pan-American Junior Champ.	C	Aug 2026	N/A	Swiss	U	7½	9	2146	62	N	

== See also ==
- Women in chess
- List of female chess players
- List of female chess grandmasters
