= Meruert Kamalidenova =

Kazakhstani chess player (born 2005)

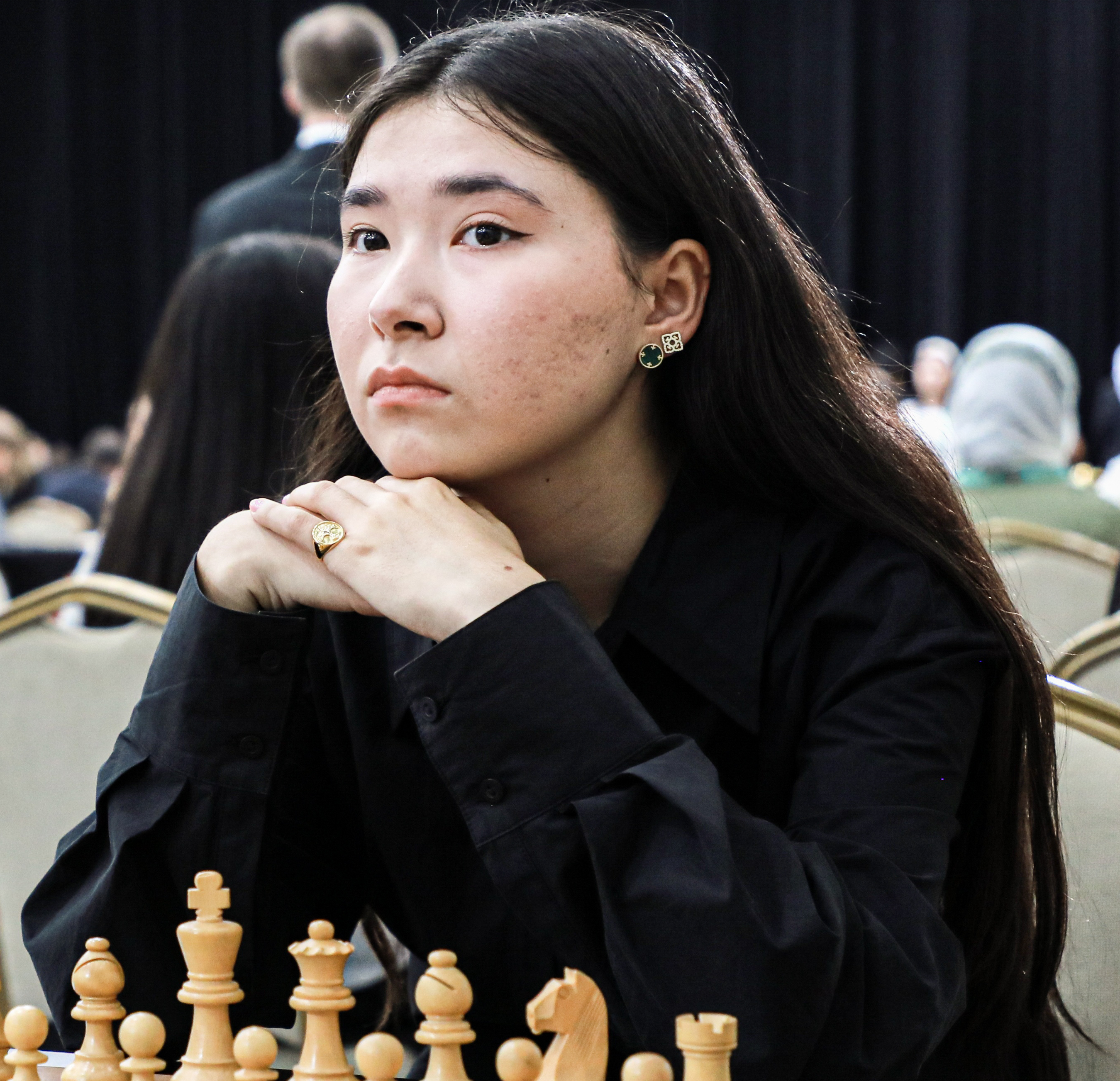
- Kamalidenova at FIDE Grand Swiss 2025

Personal information
- Native name: Меруерт Камалиденова
- Born: 3 August 2005 (age 21)

Chess career
- Country: Kazakhstan
- Title: International Master (2024); Woman Grandmaster (2023)
- FIDE rating: 2400 (November 2026)
- Peak rating: 2427 (April 2022)

Meruert Asqarqyzy Kamalidenova (Kazakh: Меруерт Асқарқызы Камалиденова; born 3 August 2005) is a Kazakh chess player who holds the title of Woman Grandmaster (2023) and International Master (IM) (2024), She was part of the Kazakhstan Women's team that won consecutive silver medals at 45th and 46th Chess Olympiad.

== Biography ==
Meruert Kamalidenova is multiple winner of Kazakhstani Youth Chess Championships in various age groups. She has repeatedly represented Kazakhstan in the World and Asian Youth Chess Championships in various age groups, where she has won World Youth Chess Championship U14 girls age group (2019), Asian Youth Chess Championship U12 girls age group (2017) and Asian Youth Chess Championship U14 girls age group.

She was awarded the Woman International Master (WIM) title in 2021, the title of Woman Grandmaster (WGM) in 2023 and the title of International Master (IM) in 2024.

In November 2021 in Riga, Kamalidenova ranked in 31st place in FIDE Women's Grand Swiss Tournament 2021.

In August–September 2024, Kamalidenova won Karaganda Akim Cup a 10 player Round Robin Tournament ahead of a field consisting of 7 Grandmasters, scoring 5½ points (+3-1=5) with wins over top seeds GM Samvel Ter-Sahaky and GM Aleksandr Rakhmanov, This put her among a select group of women who have won closed, Round Robin Tournaments ahead of male Grandmasters.

In September 2024, She was part of the Kazakhstan Women's Team that won silver medal in the Women's event of the 45th Chess Olympiad.

In July 2025, She participated in Women's World Cup as the 59th seed, She defeated 70th seed Alicja Śliwicka in Round 1, Defending Champion and 6th seed Aleksandra Goryachkina in Round 2 and 27th seed Anna Shukhman in Round 3, In round 4, She lost to 11th seed Vaishali Rameshbabu after intense tiebreaks.

In September 2025, She finished 19th at the FIDE Women's Grand Swiss Tournament, scoring 6 points (+2-1=8).

In November 2025, She was part of the Kazakhstan team that finished 4th at Women's World Team Chess Championship, She won individual Gold on Board 2.

In August 2026, She played board 4 for Kazakhstan National Sports University (KNUS), at the inaugural FIDE World University Team Chess Championship, They won the bronze medal after losing to Ural State Mining University in the semi-finals and defeating University of Texas at Dallas in the 3rd place match.

In September 2026, She was part of the Kazakhstan Women's Team that defended its silver medal in the Women's event of the 46th Chess Olympiad.
