= Petar Popović (chess player) =

Serbian chess grandmaster (born 1959)

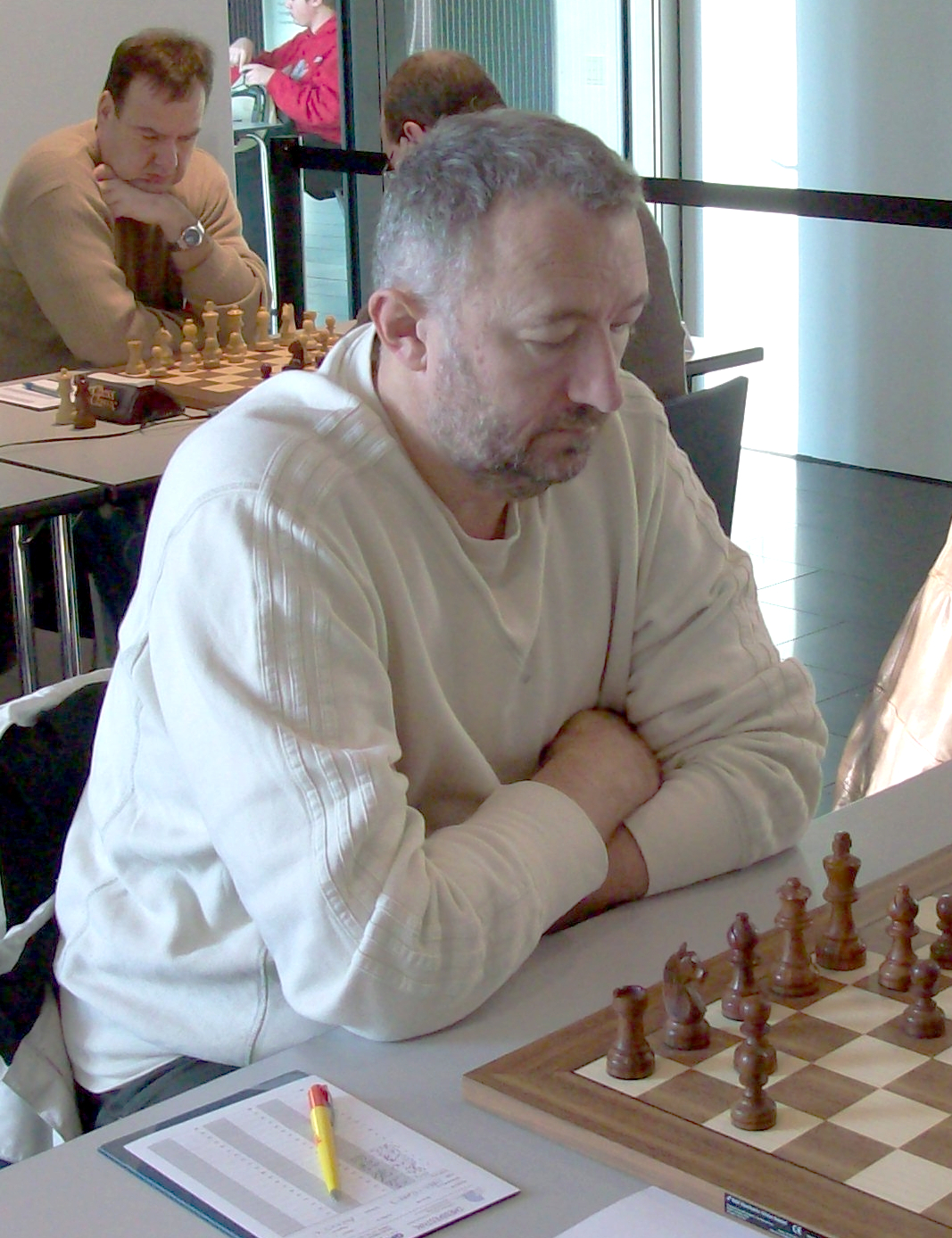

Personal information
- Born: February 14, 1959 (age 67) Orlovat, Yugoslavia

Chess career
- Country: Serbia
- Title: Grandmaster (1981)
- FIDE rating: 2431 (July 2026)
- Peak rating: 2575 (July 1996)

Petar Popović (born February 14, 1959) is a Serbian chess Grandmaster. FIDE awarded him the International Master title in 1977, and the Grandmaster title in 1981. His tournament results have included 1st at Pécs 1980, 1st at Novi Sad 1981, 2nd at Novi Sad 1984, 1st at Bor 1985, 2nd at Cannes 1986, 1st at Pucarevo 1987 and 4th at Belgrade 1987. He played on the Yugoslav Olympiad teams in 1986 and 1988. He drew a match with former Women's World Champion Maia Chiburdanidze (+1−1=6) in 1986.

He lives in Brussels.

== Notable chess games ==
Gliksman vs. Popović, Wrocław 1979

Position: h1 white rook, g1 white knight, f1 white bishop, e1 white king, c1 white bishop, b1 white knight, a1 white rook, h2 white pawn, f2 white pawn, b2 white pawn, a2 white pawn, g3 white pawn, c3 white pawn, g4 black bishop, e4 white pawn, d4 black knight, a4 white queen, d5 white pawn, c5 black pawn, h6 black bishop, g6 black pawn, d6 black pawn, b6 black queen, h7 black pawn, f7 black pawn, e7 black pawn, b7 black pawn, a7 black pawn, h8 black rook, g8 black knight, f8 black king, a8 black rook

Position after Black's tenth move.

Here is a sacrificial victory by Popović over Serbian grandmaster Slavoljub Marjanović:

Popović–Marjanović, Yugoslavia 1979 1.e4 c5 2.Nf3 d6 3.Nc3 a6 4.g3 Nc6 5.Bg2 g6 6.d4 cxd4 7.Nxd4 Bd7 8.Nd5 e6 9.Ne3 Qc7 10.O-O Bg7 11.Nxc6 bxc6 12.Nc4 d5 13.exd5 cxd5 14.Bxd5 Rd8 15.Bf4 Qc5 16.Nd6+ Ke7 17.c4 exd5 18.Nb7 Qxc4 19.Rc1 Qb5 20.Re1+ Be6 21.Rc7+ Ke8 22.Rxf7 Bf6 23.Rc7 Qb6 24.Qg4 Ne7 25.Rxe6 Qd4 26.Nxd8 1-0

Here is a miniature against German grandmaster Phillip Schlosser:

Popović–Schlosser, Brno 1992 1.e4 c5 2.Nf3 e6 3.d4 cxd4 4.Nxd4 a6 5.Bd3 Bc5 6.Nb3 Ba7 7.O-O Nc6 8.Qg4 Qf6 9.Nc3 Nge7 10.Bg5 Qg6 11.Qh4 Ne5 12.Be2 (12.Bxe7?? Nf3+) 1-0 Black is helpless against the dual threats of 13.Bh5, winning the queen, and 13.Bxe7.

Here is another miniature, which Andrew Soltis pronounced "the funniest master game (so far) of 1979":

Gliksman–Popović, Wrocław 1979 1.e4 g6 2.d4 Bg7 3.Nc3 d6 4.g3 Nc6 5.d5?! Nd4 6.Be3 c5 7.Nb1 Beginning an ill-fated plan to trap Black's knight. Qb6! 8.Bc1 Bh6! 9.c3 Bg4! 10.Qa4+ After 10.Qxg4, Bxc1 will devastate White's queenside. Kf8 11.Nd2 Qa5!! 0-1 White's queen is attacked, and 12.Qxa5 allows 12...Nc2#. 11.Na3 could have led to Bxc1 12.Nc4 Bxb2! 13.Nxb6 Bxc3#. Notes based on those by Soltis.
