= Davaadembereliin Nomin-Erdene =

Mongolian chess player (born 2000)

Davaademberel Nomin-Erdene
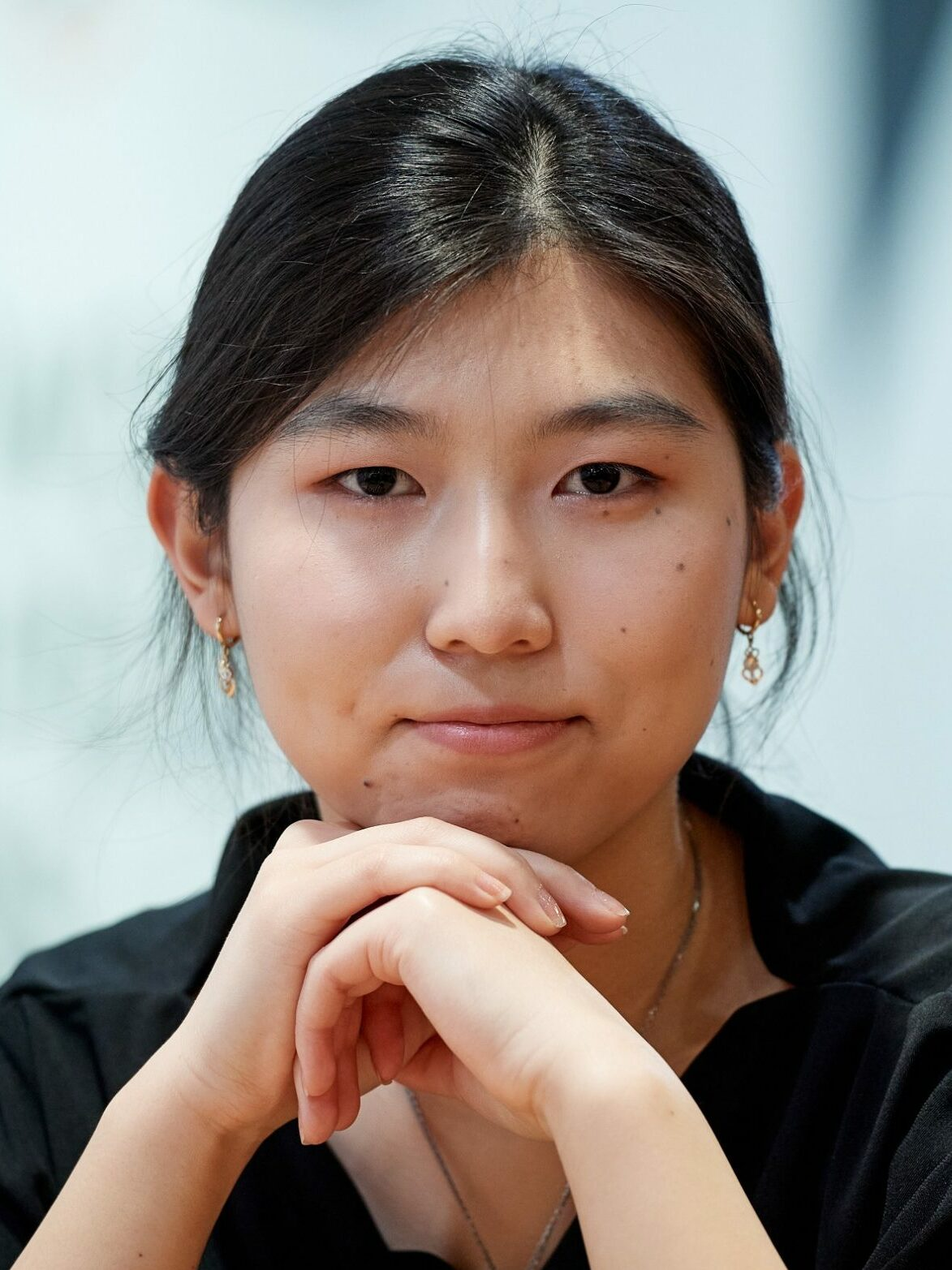
- Nomin-Erdene in Warsaw (2021)

Personal information
- Born: 15 February 2000 (age 26) Ulaanbaatar, Mongolia

Chess career
- Country: Mongolia (until 2025); Hungary (since 2025)
- Title: International Master (2015); Woman Grandmaster (2015)
- Peak rating: 2490 (April 2016)

Davaademberel Nomin-Erdene (Mongolian: Даваадэмбэрэлийн Номин-Эрдэнэ; born 15 February 2000) is a Mongolian chess player and one of the Mongolian leading players in modern history.

A chess prodigy, she is the Mongolian chess player who became the first-ever World Youth Chess Champion and Asian Youth Champion. She won the World Youth Chess Championships in her age and gender category. She holds three Grandmaster (GM) norms, and she is The youngest Mongolian chess player who earned FIDE titles Woman Grandmaster title age of 14th. Also earned the International Master title age of 15th. Nomin-Erdene has a peak FIDE rating of 2490 and has been ranked as high as No. 18 in the world among women. She has represented Mongolian women chess team at the Chess Olympiad and Asian Nations Chess Cup.

== Chess career ==
She won the Girls Under-10 section of the 2010 World Youth Chess Championship at Porto Carras. Also, she got a gold medal from Asian Youth Chess Championship in 2010 Beijing, Girls under-10. As a result, she earned the title of Woman FIDE Master (WFM). On 5 January 2015, she earned her third Woman Grandmaster (WGM) norm age of 14y10m. In September 2015 she got International Master (IM) title age of 15. She won several open tournaments. One of the best victories was FE 36 Edoardo Crespi open (2015) Milan Italy. Now she holds three Grandmaster (GM) norms. Nomin-Erdene has a peak FIDE rating of 2490 and has been ranked as high as No. 18 in the world among women. She is the only Mongolian woman chess player to be ranked in the top 20 Women players list.

== National representation ==
Nomin-Erdene has played for team Mongolia in the Women's Chess Olympiad, and Asian Nations Chess Cup. She got her first Grandmaster norm from the Hotel Sajam GM event in Novi Sad in February 2016, scoring 7/9.

== Personal life ==
Nomin-Erdene began playing chess at the age of 5, only three months later she won her first chess trophy. When she was six years old, she got her first medal from international tournament in 2006 Ulan-Ude (Russia). Nomin-Erdene was awarded Mongolian best child of the year, Ambassador of young talent, Medal of Chinggis, The best cup of a young prodigy among sportsmen of the year after she became the first-ever World Youth Chess Champion, and Asian Youth Chess Champion in 2010.

At a young age, Nomin-Erdene was lauded for her success and saw popularity in Mongolia. She won national medals and held national records The documentary film War of the Mind (Namuun Zet studio) was based on Nomin-Erdene and her family's life. It received an Academy Award in 2012.

Currently, she lives in Hungary. Since 2013 her family moved to Europe.
