= Nana Alexandria =

Georgian chess player (born 1949)

Nana Alexandria ნანა ალექსანდრია
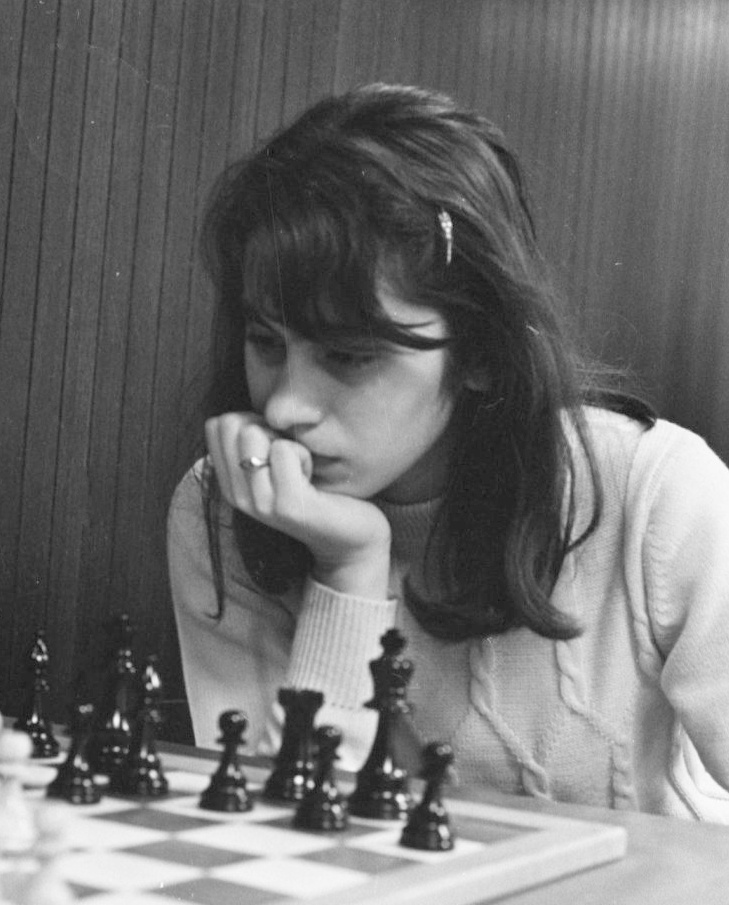
- Alexandria in 1970

Personal information
- Born: Nana Giorgis asuli Aleksandria; 13 October 1949 (age 76) Poti, Georgian Soviet Socialist Republic, Soviet Union

Chess career
- Country: Soviet Union → Georgia
- Title: Woman Grandmaster (1976)
- FIDE rating: 2342 (April 2006)
- Peak rating: 2415 (January 1988)

Nana Alexandria (Georgian: ნანა ალექსანდრია, Nana Aleksandria; born 13 October 1949) is a Georgian chess player. A three-time Soviet women's champion, she was the challenger in two matches for the Women's World Chess Championship.

== Career ==
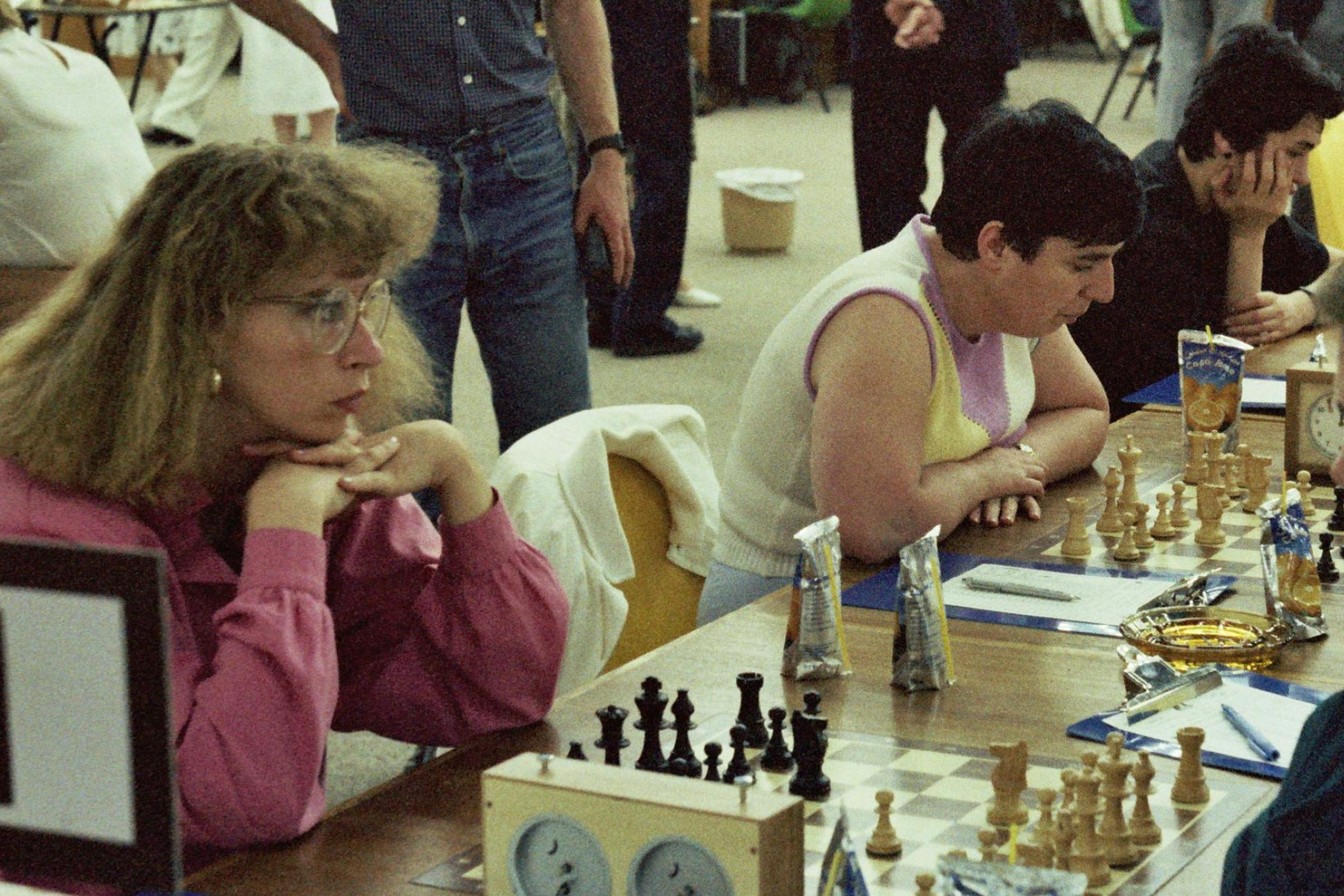
Akhmilovskaya, Gaprindashvili, and Alexandria at Chess Olympiad 1986

Alexandria was USSR women's champion in 1966, 1968 (jointly), and 1969 making her 3-times USSR champion by the age of 20. She was the Women's World Championship challenger in 1975 and 1981. In 1975 she lost to Nona Gaprindashvili (+3 =1 −8). In 1981 she drew with Maia Chiburdanidze (+4 =8 −4), who retained her title as champion. Alexandria played for the Soviet national team in the Women's Chess Olympiads of 1969, 1974, 1978, 1980, 1982, and 1986. She was one of the contributing players of the USSR team that dominated the Women's Olympiads of the 1980s.

FIDE awarded her the Woman International Master (WIM) title in 1966 and the Woman Grandmaster (WGM) title in 1976. Alexandria also received the title International Arbiter in 1995. She was the chairperson of the FIDE Women's Commission from 1986 to 2001.

== Personal life ==
She is the mother of the Georgian politician Giga Bokeria.

In 2021, Alexandria appeared in the documentary Glory to the Queen alongside Nona Gaprindashvili, Maia Chiburdanidze and Nana Ioseliani.
