= Nancy Marie Brown =

American writer

Nancy Marie Brown (born 1959) is an American author, having written five non-fiction books. In The Far Traveler: Voyages of a Viking Woman, she reconstructed the life of Gudrid (born ca. 980), an Icelandic voyager known through the Vinland sagas. Her book, Song of the Vikings: Snorri and the Making of Norse Myths, a Times Literary Supplement 2012 Book of the Year, concerned Snorri Sturluson (1179–1241), an Icelandic poet, historian and statesman. In her 2015 book, Ivory Vikings, the Mystery of the Most Famous Chessmen in the World and the Woman Who Made Them, she argues that Margret the Adroit made the Lewis Chessmen.

== Works ==
- A Good Horse Has No Color: Searching Iceland for the Perfect Horse (2001)
- Mendel in the Kitchen: A Scientist's View of Genetically Modified Food (with Nina Fedoroff, 2004)
- The Far Traveler: Voyages of a Viking Woman (2007)
- The Abacus and the Cross: The Story of the Pope Who Brought the Light of Science to the Dark Ages (2010)
- Song of the Vikings: Snorri and the Making of Norse Myths (2012)
- The Saga of Gudrid the Far-Traveler (2015)
- Ivory Vikings: The Mystery of the Most Famous Chessmen in the World and the Woman Who Made Them (2015)
- The Real Valkyrie: The Hidden History of Viking Warrior Women (2021)
- Looking for the Hidden Folk: How Iceland's Elves Can Save the Earth (2022)

== Sources ==
- Nancy Marie Brown author web site
