= Nana Ioseliani =

Georgian chess player (born 1962)

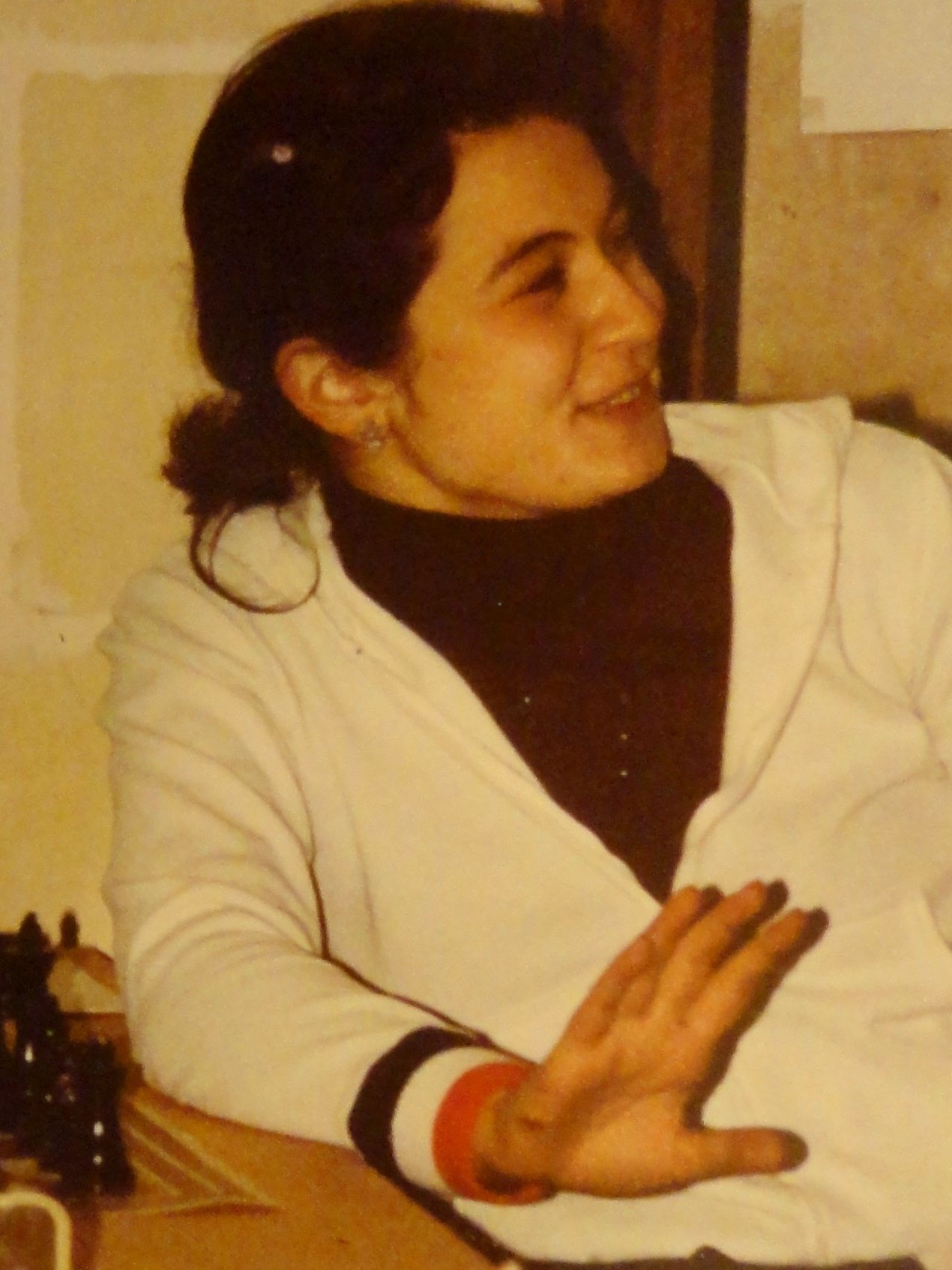
- Ioseliani in 1980

Personal information
- Born: 12 February 1962 (age 64) Tbilisi, Georgian SSR, Soviet Union

Chess career
- Country: Soviet Union; Georgia
- Title: International Master (1993); Woman Grandmaster (1980)
- FIDE rating: 2462 (July 2026)
- Peak rating: 2520 (July 1997)

Nana Ioseliani (Georgian: ნანა იოსელიანი; born 12 February 1962) is a Georgian chess player. FIDE awarded her the Woman Grandmaster title in 1980 and the International Master title in 1993.

== Biography ==
Already in 1978 she was supposed to be on the Soviet woman's team playing at the 23rd Chess Olympiad in Buenos Aires. However, the entire team consisted of Georgian players, and Soviet officials replaced Ioseliani - the youngest - for a Russian-born player. Ioseliani was on the Soviet team during the 24th and 25th Olympiads. Later she joined the Georgian team in the 30th Chess Olympiad and again in the 31st and 32nd. Her team won gold all five times. She participated in the three next Olympiads too; Georgia ending in 3rd, 2nd and 4th place, respectively. Her individual score was 65 points from 88 games (+49, =32, -7).

In 1979 and in 1980 she was the girls winner of the European Junior Chess Championship. She has twice won the candidates' tournament to play for the Women's World Chess Championship. In 1988 she challenged defending champion Maia Chiburdanidze, and lost by 8½ to 9½ (+2, =11, -3). Her championship appearance in 1993 marks her as the first and only player for Georgia to represent the country in a World Chess Championship. In 1993 she played Xie Jun, and lost by 2½ to 8½.

She has won the Women's Soviet Chess Championship four times. Ioseliani also played for Georgia in the 1997 World Team Chess Championship, scoring 1½/7 on board 2.

Ioseliani made a Grandmaster (GM) norm in the 2000 Schuhplattler Munich edition of the Women–Veterans chess tournaments.

Since 2003, Ioseliani has taken a break from chess playing, and is an entrepreneur in Prague.

In 2021, Ioseliani appeared in the documentary Glory to the Queen alongside Nana Alexandria, Nona Gaprindashvili, and Maia Chiburdanidze.

In 1978 she was acting in a cinematography too. In a short comedy Pereryv she was a chess player, who beat all her male colleagues.
