= Margret the Adroit =

Icelandic ivory carver

Margret the Adroit (Icelandic: Margrét hin haga) was an Icelandic carver of the 12th and early 13th centuries.

== Career ==
Margret the Adroit appears in a single textual source: the Icelandic saga Páls saga biskups (Saga of Bishop Páll). She lived in Skálholt, as the wife of Thorir the priest, who assisted Bishop Páll Jónsson and managed the see after the bishop's death in 1211. At the time, it was common for bishops to send and receive expensive gifts from other bishops and noblemen. According to the saga, "Margret made everything that Bishop Pall wanted." As a gift for the Archbishop, Bishop Páll commissioned a "bishop's crozier of walrus ivory, carved so skilfully that no one in Iceland had ever seen such artistry before; it was made by Margaret the Adroit, who at that time was the most skilled carver in all Iceland." He also commissioned an altarpiece and "Margret carved the walrus ivory extremely well."

== Claims regarding the Lewis Chessmen ==
In 2010 at a conference at the National Museum of Scotland on the Lewis Chessmen, Gudmundur Thorarinsson (a civil engineer and a former member of the Icelandic Parliament) and Einar S. Einarsson (a former president of Visa Iceland and a friend of the chess champion Bobby Fischer) argued that Margret the Adroit made the chessmen. It is a claim that US author Nancy Marie Brown supports in her 2015 book, Ivory Vikings, the Mystery of the Most Famous Chessmen in the World and the Woman Who Made Them.

== Notes ==
- Páls saga is edited and translated in Gudbrand Vigfusson; Powell, F. York (1905). "Póls saga". Origines Islandicae: A collection of the more important sagas and other native writings relating to the settlement and early history of Iceland. Vol. 1. Oxford: Clarendon Press. pp. 502–534.
