= Valentina Gunina =

Russian chess grandmaster (born 1989)

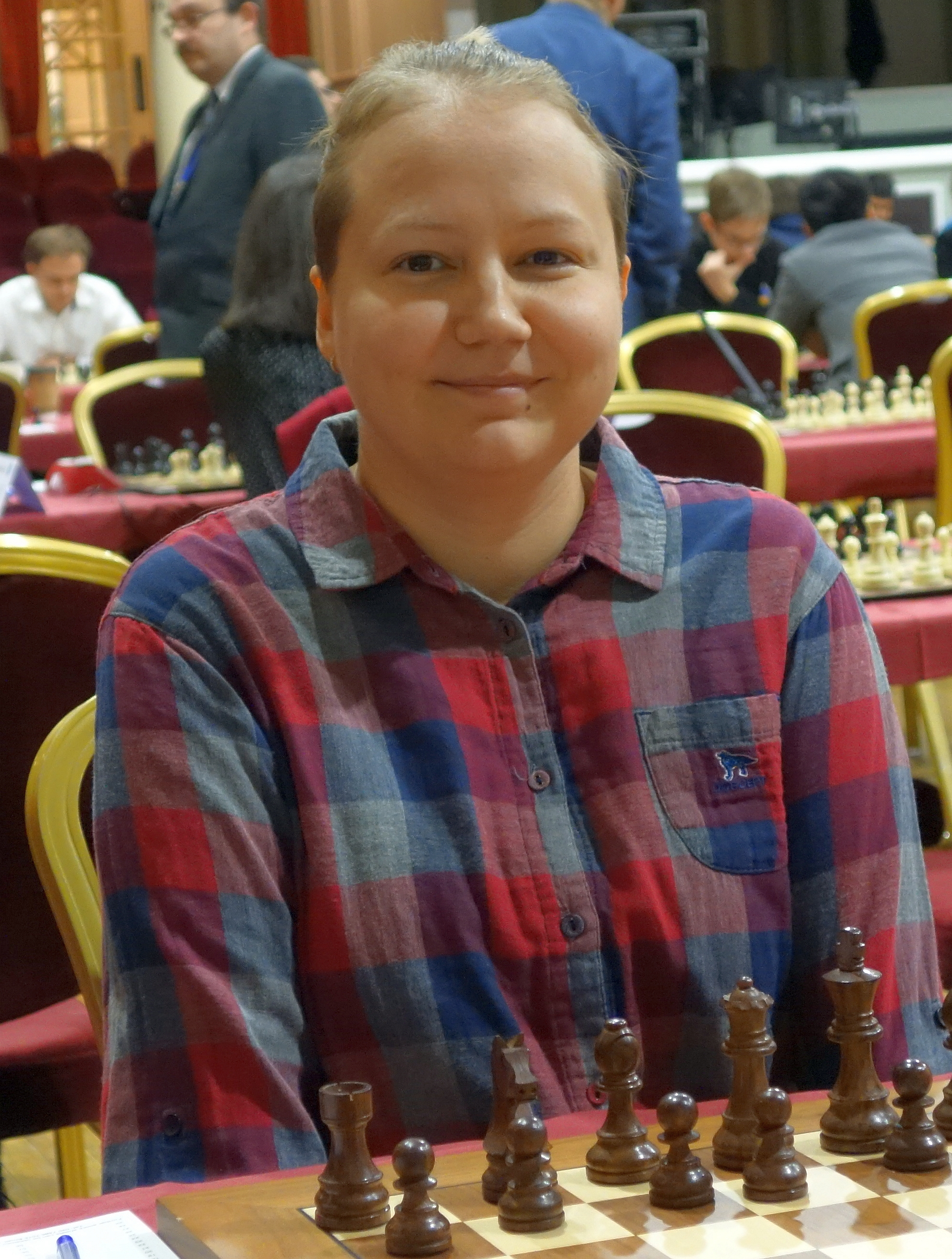
- Gunina in 2023

Personal information
- Born: Valentina Evgenyevna Gunina; 4 February 1989 (age 37) Murmansk, Russian SFSR, Soviet Union

Chess career
- Country: Russia (until 2023); FIDE (since 2023)
- Title: Grandmaster (2013)
- Peak rating: 2548 (June 2015)
- Peak ranking: No. 6 woman (June 2015)

Valentina Evgenyevna Gunina (Russian: Валентина Евгеньевна Гунина; born 4 February 1989) is a Russian chess grandmaster. She is the two-time Women's World Blitz Chess Champion (2012 and 2023), has won the Women's European Individual Chess Championship three times (2012, 2014, 2018), and has won the Russian Women's Championship five times (2011, 2013, 2014, 2021, 2022). She was a member of the gold medal-winning Russian team at the Women's Chess Olympiads of 2010, 2012, 2014, at the Women's European Team Chess Championships of 2007, 2009, 2011, 2015, 2017, 2019 and at the Women's World Team Chess Championship of 2017.

Gunina won the 2016 London Chess Classic Super Rapidplay Open in one of the best performances or victories for a woman at a top-level chess tournament, defeating several top 100 grandmasters along the way.

== Career ==
Gunina won the gold medal in the 2000 European under-12 girls championship, 2003 world U14 girls championship, 2004 European U16 girls championship and in the 2007 world U18 girls championship. She was the bronze medalist in the 2006 European U18 girls championship.

In 2006, she won the Women's Russian Championship Higher League scoring 7/9 and qualified for the Russian Women's Championship Superfinal. She placed eleventh with 2½/11. In 2008, she won the Women's Russian Championship Higher League for the second time with a score of 7½/9. In the Superfinal she scored 4/9. In 2009, she won the Russian junior (under 20) girls championship.

In 2012, she won the Women's World Blitz Championship in Batumi, Georgia. In the same year, Gunina competed for the first time in the Women's World Championship: she defeated Gu Xiaobing in the first round, then she was knocked out by Alisa Galliamova in round two. Gunina won the Russian women's rapid chess championship 2014 in Saint Petersburg.

In January 2015, she took part in the Tata Steel Challengers tournament in Wijk aan Zee, the Netherlands, where she scored 5/13. At the Women's World Chess Championship 2015 Gunina made it to the third round, where she was eliminated by Pia Cramling, after knocking out Camilla Baginskaite and Olga Girya. In September 2015, she won the Moscow Women's Blitz Championship.

In February 2019, she became the inaugural winner of the Cairns Cup, in Saint Louis, as she ended the tournament with 7/9.

In late May 2019, Valentina faced American GM Irina Krush in the quarterfinal match of the 2019 Women's Speed Chess Championship, an online blitz and bullet competition hosted by Chess.com. Valentina dominated the match and won with an overall score of 24−5.

In December 2023, Valentina won the Women's World Blitz Chess Championship 2023 with a score of 14/17 (+12−1=4).

== Awards ==
On 25 October 2014, she was awarded the Medal of the Order "For Merit to the Fatherland", 1st class "for great contribution to the development of physical culture and sport, the high sporting achievements at the XXXXI World Chess Olympiad in Tromsø (Norway)".

== Personal life ==
Together with 43 other Russian elite chess players, Gunina signed an open letter to Russian president Vladimir Putin, protesting against the 2022 Russian invasion of Ukraine and expressing solidarity with the Ukrainian people.
