= Women–Veterans chess tournaments =

The Women–Veterans chess tournaments, also known as the Ladies–Veterans chess tournaments or the Dance tournaments, was an annual series of Scheveningen team chess matches held from 1992 to 2001 between a team of top female chess players and a team of veteran former top players. The series was organized by the Max Euwe Association and sponsored by the association's co-founder Joop van Oosterom. It was referred to as the Dance tournaments because each tournament was named after a dance associated with the host city. The series was relatively balanced. The veterans teams' overall score was 6–3 with one tie. They generally had better ratings than the women's teams, but typically only by a relatively small margin under 50 Elo.

== Results ==
Symbol key
Individual winner

Year	Name	Location	Prize money	Team winner	Score	Women top scorer	Score	Veterans top scorer	Score
1992	Tumba	Aruba	$75,000	Veterans	39–33	Judit Polgar	7½/12	Lev Polugaevsky	8½/12
1993	Waltz	Vienna	?	Women	40½–31½	Maia Chiburdanidze	9/12	Vassily Smyslov	6½/12
1994	Palladienne	Monte Carlo	?	Women	37–35	Judit Polgar; Xie Jun	7½/12	Vassily Smyslov	8/12
1995	Polka	Prague	?	Women	26½–23½	Judit Polgar; Pia Cramling	6½/10	Viktor Korchnoi	5½/10
1996	Foxtrot	London	?	Veterans	27½–22½	Ketevan Arakhamia	6½/10	Lajos Portisch; Vassily Smyslov	6½/10
1997	Hostdans	Copenhagen	?	Veterans	27–23	Ketevan Arakhamia	5½/10	Lajos Portisch	6/10
1998	Can-can	Copenhagen	?	Tie	36–36	Zhu Chen	7/12	Viktor Korchnoi	9/12
1999	Flamenco	Marbella	?	Veterans	30½–19½	Maia Chiburdanidze; Xie Jun	4½/10	Viktor Korchnoi	7½/10
2000	Schuhplattler	Munich	?	Women	27–23	Nana Ioseliani; Xie Jun	6½/10	Viktor Korchnoi	7½/10
2001	Klompendans	Amsterdam	?	Veterans	26–24	Zhu Chen	6/10	Lajos Portisch	6½/10

== Scores ==
Player	Team	'92	'93	'94	'95	'96	'97	'98	'99	'00	'01	Total	%
Lev Polugaevsky (RUS)	V	8½										8½/12	0.701
Judit Polgar (HUN)	W	7½		7½	6½							21½/34	0.632
Oscar Panno (ARG)	V	7										7/12	0.583
Susan Polgar (HUN)	W	6½	7½	7	4½							25½/46	0.554
Borislav Ivkov (FRY)	V	6½	5	4½		4½						20½/46	0.446
Vassily Smyslov (RUS)	V	6	6½	8	5	6½	5½	4½	4½	5	5	56½/108	0.523
Pia Cramling (SWE)	W	6			6½	5½	5	6½	4			33½/64	0.523
Efim Geller (HUN)	V	6	6									12/24	0.500
Wolfgang Uhlmann (GER)	V	5										5/12	0.417
Alisa Galliamova (RUS)	W	5	5½						2½	6	4	23/54	0.426
Maia Chiburdanidze (GEO)	W	4	9	5½				6½	4½			29½/56	0.523
Ketevan Arakhamia (GEO)	W	4	5½	3		6½	5½	3½				28/68	0.411
Bent Larsen (DEN)	V		7½	3½								11/24	0.458
Xie Jun (CHN)	W		7	7½	5	4½	5	4½	4½	6½	5½	50/96	0.521
Sofia Polgar (HUN)	W		6			2				3	3½	14½/42	0.345
Fridrik Olafsson (ISL)	V		4									4/12	0.333
Andreas Duckstein (AUT)	V		2½									2½/12	0.208
Vlastimil Hort (GER)	V			7½	4½	5½	5½	7	6½	4½	5½	46½/84	0.554
Nana Ioseliani (GEO)	W			6½	4	4	3½	5½		6½	5	35/74	0.473
Boris Spassky (FRA)	V			6	5	5½	4½	7½	5½			34/64	0.531
Lajos Portisch (HUN)	V			5½	3½	6½	6	5	6½		6½	39½/74	0.534
Viktor Korchnoi (SUI)	V				5½			9	7½	7½	5½	35/52	0.673
Mark Taimanov (RUS)	V					3½	4½	2½		3½	3½	17½/52	0.337
Zhu Chen (CHN)	W						4	7	4	5	6	26/52	0.500
Hans Bouwmeester (NED)	V									2½		2½/10	0.250

== See also ==
- FIDE Women's Grand Prix
