= María Teresa Mora =

Cuban chess player (1902–1980

María Teresa Mora Iturralde
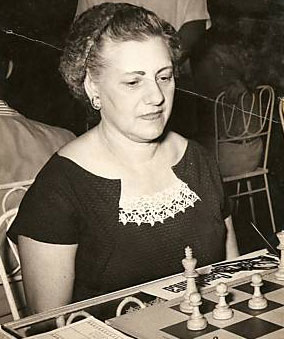
- Maria Teresa Mora Iturralde
- Country: Cuba
- Born: October 15, 1902; Havana, Cuba
- Died: October 3, 1980 (aged 77); Havana, Cuba
- Title: Woman International Master (1950)

María Teresa Mora Iturralde (15 October 1902 – 3 October 1980) was a Cuban chess master.

Born in Havana, she is the only person who received direct lessons from José Raúl Capablanca. Mora was the first woman to win the Cuban Chess Championship (in 1922).

She was twice a challenger for the Women's World Champion. She tied for seventh/eighth place at Buenos Aires 1939 (Vera Menchik won), and 10-11th at Moscow 1949/50 (Lyudmila Rudenko won).

Mora was awarded the Woman International Master (WIM) title in 1950. She was born and died in Havana.

== History ==
María Teresa Mora Iturralde was born in Havana on October 15, 1902. She died on October 3, 1980, in Havana. María Teresa was considered a child prodigy in various fields. Chess was one of them. From a very young age, she played chess against her father, whom it was normal for her to win. Which led her to be a student of Rafael de Pazos, who remained president of the Havana Chess Club for several years, and later José Raúl Capablanca, admired for her way of playing, decided to accept her as a disciple, being the only person he bestowed upon him such a high honor. At the age of 11, she participated and won in her first tournament, at the Havana Chess Club, being his first feat in the sport.

In 1922 she conquered the Cuban national title by winning the Copa Dewars tournament, an event that was considered the national championship and with her being the only woman in the tournament. In 1938 she obtained the women's national title, which she held for 22 years, until 1960, retiring undefeated. She participated representing Cuba in two world women's chess championships, in 1939 in Buenos Aires, with Vera Menchik as the winner, and in 1949/50 in Moscow, with Lyudmila Rudenko as the winner. In 1950 she received the title of International Master from the hands of Folke Rogard, president of the International Chess Federation, and became the first Latin American woman to achieve it.
