= Eva Moser =

Austrian chess player (1982–2019)

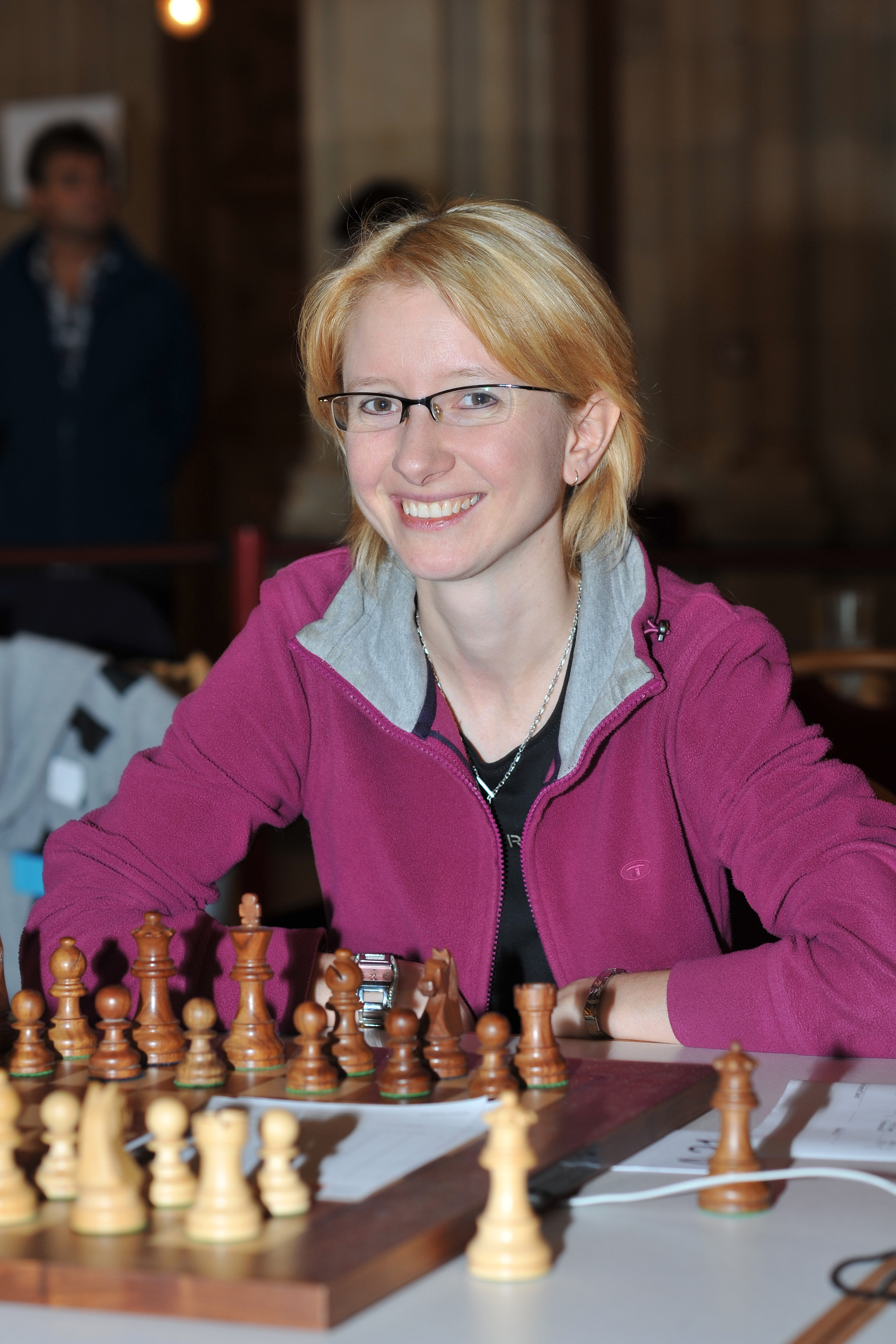
- Eva Moser at the Vienna Chess Open 2013

Personal information
- Born: 26 July 1982 Tamsweg, Austria
- Died: 31 March 2019 (aged 36) Graz, Austria

Chess career
- Country: Austria
- Title: International Master (2004); Woman Grandmaster (2003)
- Peak rating: 2471 (July 2012)

Eva Moser (26 July 1982 – 31 March 2019) was an Austrian chess player. She was awarded the titles International Master (IM), in 2004, and Woman Grandmaster (WGM), in 2003, by FIDE. Moser won both the absolute and women's Austrian chess championships. She competed in the Women's World Chess Championship in 2008.

== Chess career ==
Moser started playing chess at the age of 10. She won the Austrian chess championship for girls, in various age groups, eight times.

In 1998 Moser won the silver medal at the Under 16 girls' event of the European Youth Chess Championships in Mureck, behind Ana Matnadze, who won on tie-break.

In team events, Moser has represented Austria in the Women's Chess Olympiad since 2000, open section (commonly referred to as "men's section") of the 36th Chess Olympiad in 2004, Women's European Team Chess Championship since 2003, and open section of the Mitropa Cup (1999, 2002, 2004).

Moser was awarded by FIDE the titles of Woman Grandmaster (WGM) in 2003 (Austria's first one) and International Master (IM) in 2004.

In 2006, she won the Austrian Chess Championship, becoming the first woman to do so. She won the Austrian women's championship in 2010 and 2011.

Tournament victories include the Dresden women's event in 2000, Jena Open in 2009, 2010, 2011 and 2012, and Chess Ladies Vienna in 2012 and 2013.

In 2006/07 her Austrian First League team Styria Graz became Austrian Team Champion. She used to play for the team Wolfsberg in Austria; and OSG Baden-Baden in the German Women's Chess Bundesliga, winning at least five times, and dominating for many years.

Her personal trainer was the Bulgarian (later Austrian) Grandmaster Ilia Balinov.

Moser also published a small number of instructional chess DVDs with ChessBase.

== Personal life ==
Moser completed a degree in business administration in Graz in 2009. She worked for the Austrian chess magazine "Schach-Aktiv".

Eva Moser died of leukaemia on 31 March 2019 in Graz.
