= Maia Chiburdanidze =

Georgian chess grandmaster (born 1961)

Maia Chiburdanidze მაია ჩიბურდანიძე
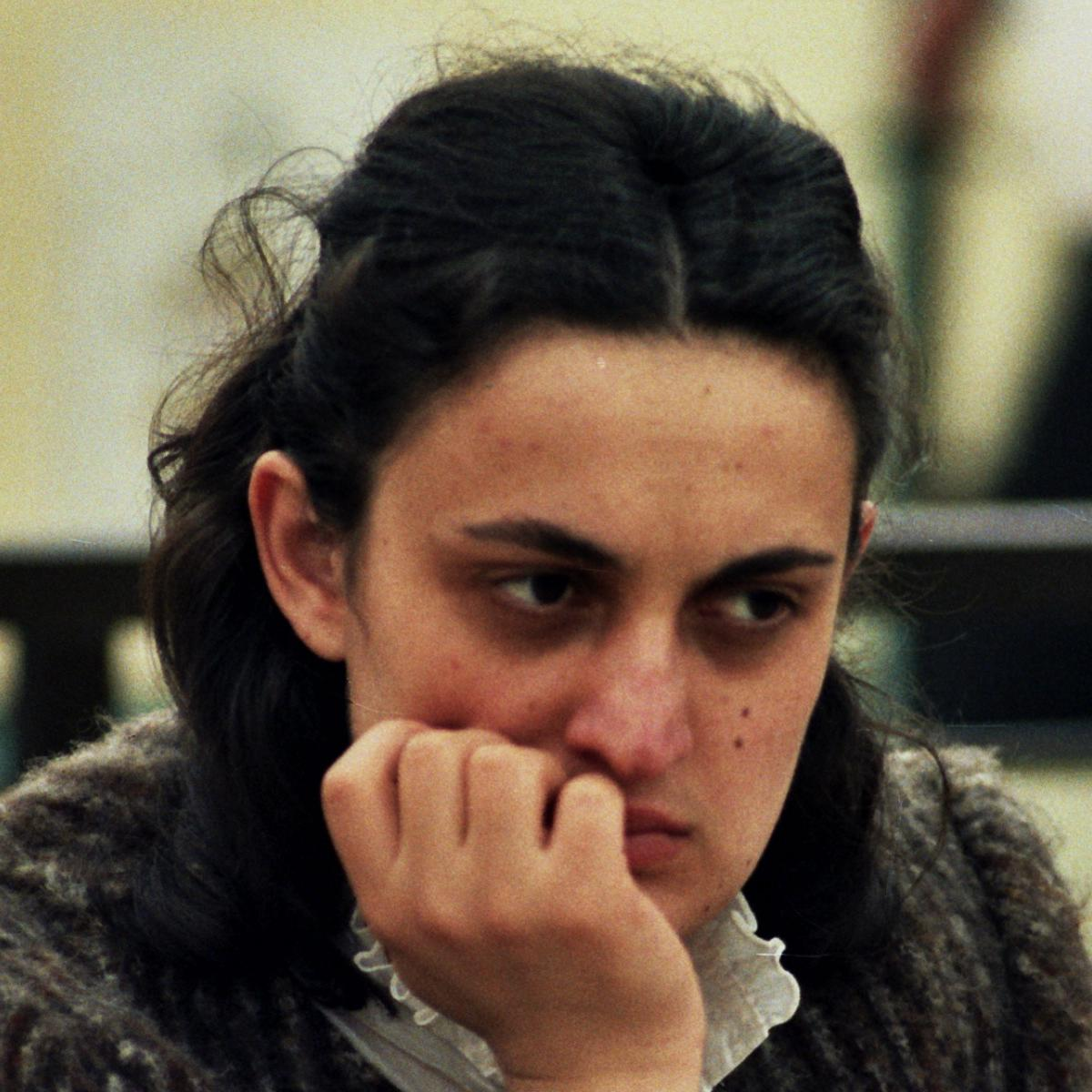
- Maia Chiburdanidze, Thessaloniki 1984

Personal information
- Born: 17 January 1961 (age 65) Kutaisi, Georgian SSR, Soviet Union

Chess career
- Country: Soviet Union → Georgia
- Title: Grandmaster (1984)
- Women's World Champion: 1978–1991
- FIDE rating: 2500 (July 2026) [inactive]
- Peak rating: 2560 (January 1988)
- Peak ranking: No. 48 (January 1988)

Maia Chiburdanidze (Georgian: მაია ჩიბურდანიძე; born 17 January 1961) is a Georgian chess Grandmaster. She is the sixth Women's World Chess Champion, a title she held from 1978 to 1991, and was the youngest one until 2010, when this record was broken by Hou Yifan. Chiburdanidze is the second woman to be awarded the title of Grandmaster by FIDE, which took place in 1984. She has played on nine gold-medal-winning teams in the Women's Chess Olympiad.

== Early life and career ==
Maia Chiburdanidze was born in Kutaisi, Georgian Soviet Socialist Republic, USSR, and started playing chess around the age of eight. She became the USSR girls' champion in 1976, and a year later she won the women's title. In 1977, Chiburdanidze was awarded the title of Woman Grandmaster by FIDE.

Chiburdanidze won outright on her debut, at the Braşov women's international tournament of 1974, when she was only 13 years old and went on to win another tournament in Tbilisi in 1975 before entering the women's world championship cycle of 1976/77.

Chiburdanidze's style of play is solid, but aggressive and well grounded in classical principles; it was influenced by Eduard Gufeld, a top Soviet trainer, who was her coach early in her career.

== Women's World Champion (1978–91) ==
Chiburdanidze finished second in the Tbilisi Women's Interzonal (1976), thereby qualifying for the 1977 candidates matches. She advanced through to the Candidates Final, where she beat Alla Kushnir by 7½–6½ to set up a world title match in Pitsunda, Georgia, against Nona Gaprindashvili, the reigning women's world champion. Chiburdanidze defeated Gaprindashvili by 8½–6½.

She successfully defended her title four times. In 1981, Chiburdanidze retained her title by drawing 8–8 with Nana Alexandria, in Borjomi/Tbilisi. Three years later, she played Irina Levitina in Volgograd, Russia, and won 8½–5½. The next defense came against Elena Akhmilovskaya in Sofia in 1986, which Chiburdanidze won 8½–5½. In 1988 she beat Nana Ioseliani in Telavi, Georgia, by 8½–7½.

FIDE awarded Chiburdanidze the title of Grandmaster in 1984. She is the second woman, after Gaprindashvili, to be awarded the title.

== Losing the title ==
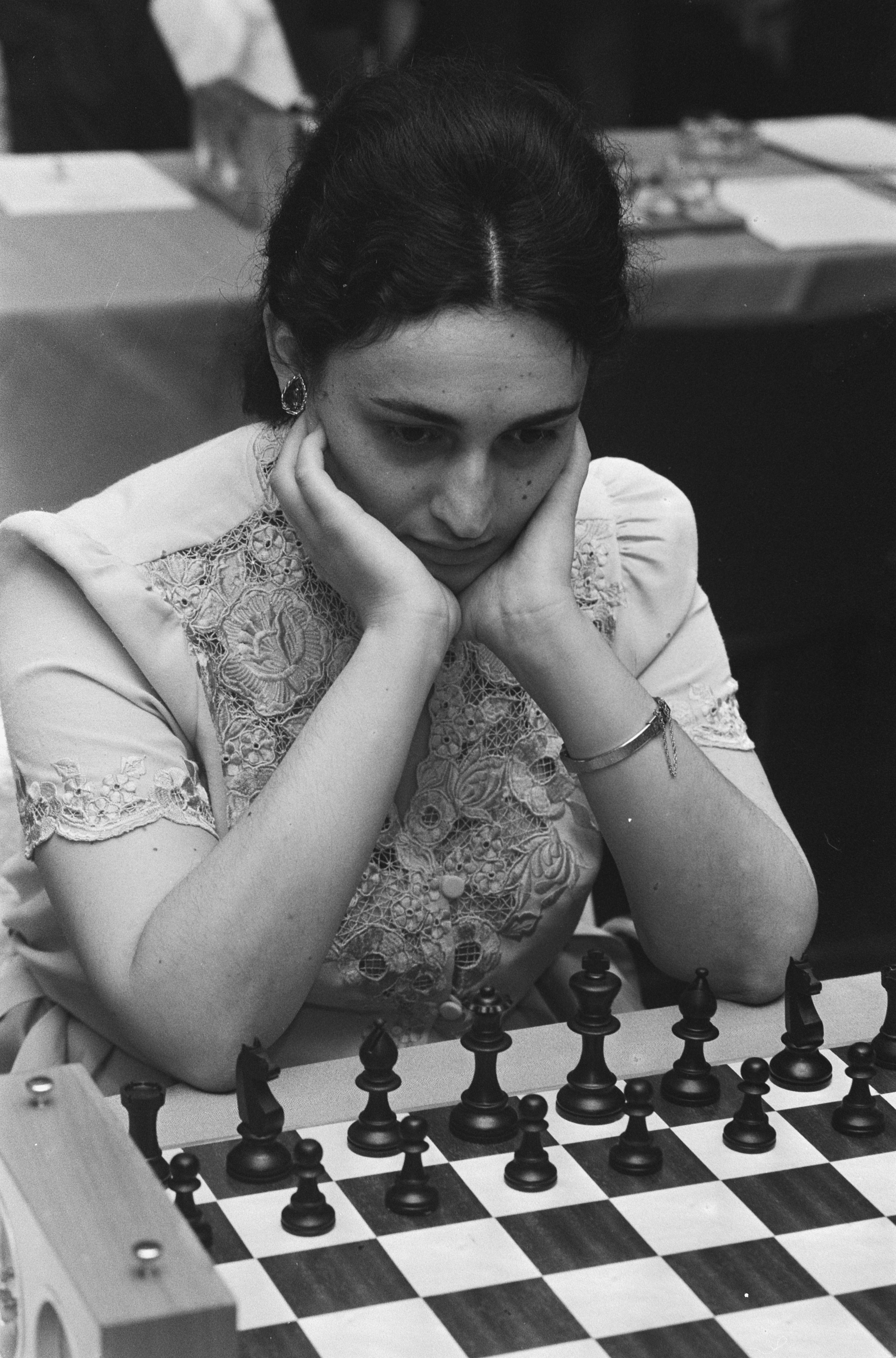
Chiburdanidze in 1986

Xie Jun of China won the right to challenge for the world championship in February 1991. Chiburdanidze lost her crown to the young Chinese player in Manila by 8½–6½. Her reign was the third longest, at 13 years, behind only that of the first women's champion, Vera Menchik, who reigned for 17 years from 1927 until her death in 1944, and Gaprindashvili's 16 years.

Chiburdanidze has attempted to regain the world title but, with the rise of the Chinese women and the formidable Polgár sisters, this has proved difficult and her best performance since 1991 has been first in the Tilburg Candidates tournament of 1994, losing the playoff to Zsuzsa Polgár by 5½–1½. Subsequently, despite not approving of the knockout format, she has entered the world championships of recent years. She reached the semi-finals in 2001, only to be knocked out by Zhu Chen of China, who went on to win the title. In 2004, Chiburdanidze again reached the semi-finals, where she lost to Antoaneta Stefanova, who went on to win the title.

== Other chess achievements ==
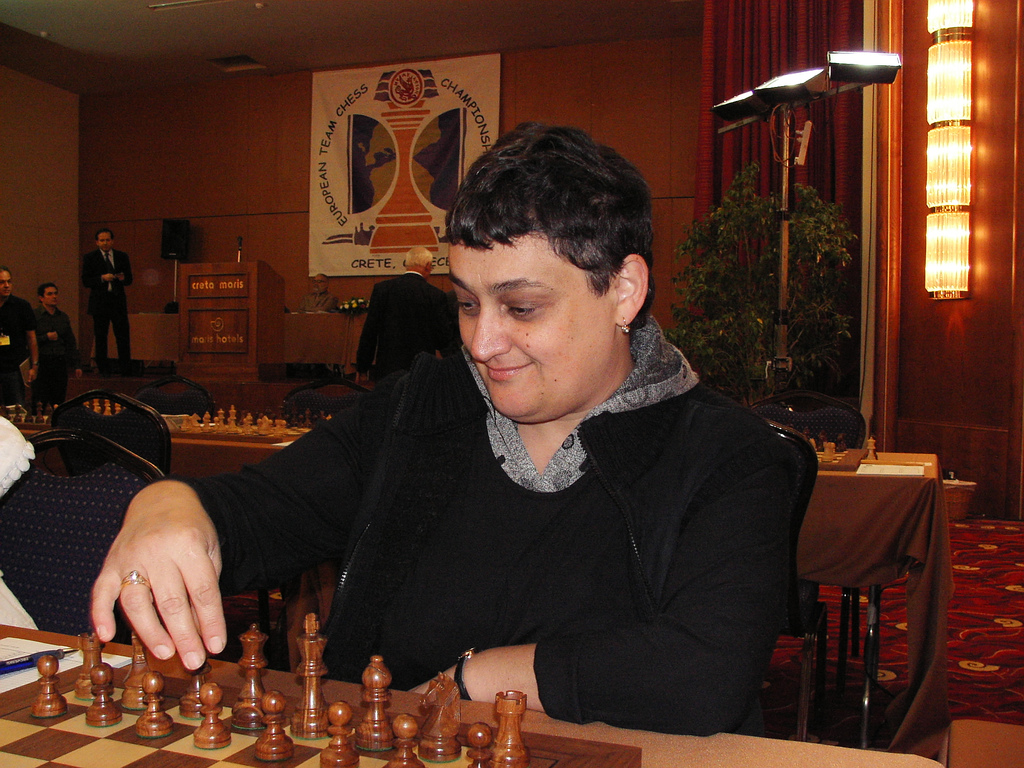
Chiburdanidze, Heraklion 2007

Chiburdanidze is unimpressed with 'women's chess', and hopes for a time when there will be no need for men's and women's tournaments. She has played extensively in "men's" tournaments around the world and her best form was seen in the 1980s and early 1990s. She was 1st in tournaments in New Delhi (1984) and Banja Luka (1985), finished third in Bilbao (1987) with a 2616 performance rating against elite players while equalising in an 8 game match against GM Petar Popović who had a rating of 2545 and in the next decade she finished 1st in Belgrade (1992), Vienna (1993), and Lippstadt (1995, 1996, 1997).

Chiburdanidze was the first woman to win an elite round-robin tournament, winning two in the mid-1980s.

She was a key member of the USSR team that dominated the women's Olympiads of the 1980s and, when Georgia achieved independence from the Soviet Union in 1990, she played board 1 for the new Georgian national team that won four gold medals, in 1992, 1994, 1996 and 2008.

She also played in the European Team Championships of 1997 when Georgia won the gold medal and in the 1st Europe v Asia Intercontinental rapidplay match which was held in Batumi (Georgia) in September 2001. Asia won the women's section by 21½–10½ with Maia contributing 3½. In 2008 Dresden Olympiad, she played on board 1, for Georgia, that won the gold medal (1st place), and she also won gold medal for best performance (2715 pt). As of 2025, she has not played competitively since July, 2012.

== Other ==
Chiburdanidze has been honoured many times by her country, and several postage stamps have been designed to celebrate her chess achievements. Mongolia issued a commemorative stamp in 1986 which illustrates a position in one of her games from the 1984 world championship match against Irina Levitina. She was inducted into the World Chess Hall of Fame in 2014.

In 2021, Chiburdanidze appeared in the documentary Glory to the Queen alongside Nana Alexandria, Nona Gaprindashvili, and Nana Ioseliani.

Preceded by Nona Gaprindashvili	Women's World Chess Champion; 1978–1991	Succeeded by Xie Jun
