= Women's Candidates Tournament =

Women's chess tournament

The Women's Candidates Tournament is a major women's chess tournament organized by FIDE.

It is a final contest to determine the challenger for the Women's World Chess Championship. The winner of the Candidates earns the right to a match for the World Championship against the incumbent world champion. The inaugural Women's Candidates tournament was held in 1952 and continued for every Women's World Championship match (except 1958) until 1997, after which the match format was abandoned and replaced by a knock-out tournament. The Women's Candidates tournament was brought back in 2019 when FIDE re-instituted the match format as the sole format for determining the Women's World Champion.

== Winners and results ==
Symbol key
°	Won the subsequent Women's World Championship

Edition	Host city	Prize fund	Winner	Runner-up	Third
1952	Moscow, Russia		(Soviet Union) Elisabeth Bykova°	(Netherlands) Fenny Heemskerk	(Soviet Union) Olga Ignatieva
1955	Moscow, Russia		(Soviet Union) Olga Rubtsova°	(Soviet Union) Larissa Volpert	(East Germany) Edith Keller-Herrmann
1959	Plovdiv, Bulgaria		(Soviet Union) Kira Zvorykina	(Socialist Federal Republic of Yugoslavia) Verica Nedeljković	(Soviet Union) Larissa Volpert
1961	Vrnjačka Banja, Yugoslavia		(Soviet Union) Nona Gaprindashvili°	(Soviet Union) Valentina Borisenko	(Soviet Union) Kira Zvorykina
1964	Sukhumi, Georgia		(Soviet Union) Alla Kushnir	(Socialist Federal Republic of Yugoslavia) Milunka Lazarević	(Soviet Union) Tatiana Zatulovskaya
1967	Subotica, Yugoslavia		(Soviet Union) Alla Kushnir	(Soviet Union) Valentina Kozlovskaya	(Soviet Union) Tatiana Zatulovskaya
1971	Kislovodsk, Russia		(Soviet Union) Alla Kushnir	(Soviet Union) Nana Alexandria	(Soviet Union) Tatiana Zatulovskaya (Socialist Federal Republic of Yugoslavia) Milunka Lazarević
1974–75	Moscow, Russia		(Soviet Union) Nana Alexandria	(Soviet Union) Irina Levitina	(Soviet Union) Marta Shul (Soviet Union) Valentina Kozlovskaya
1977–78	Bad Kissingen, Germany		(Soviet Union) Maia Chiburdanidze°	(Israel) Alla Kushnir	(Soviet Union) Elena Akhmilovskaya (Soviet Union) Elena Fatalibekova
1980–81	Tbilisi, Georgia		(Soviet Union) Nana Alexandria	(Soviet Union) Nana Ioseliani	(Soviet Union) Marta Litinskaya (Soviet Union) Nona Gaprindashvili
1983–84	Sochi, Russia		(Soviet Union) Irina Levitina	(Soviet Union) Lidia Semenova	(Soviet Union) Nana Alexandria (Soviet Union) Nana Ioseliani
1986	Malmö, Sweden		(Soviet Union) Elena Akhmilovskaya	(Soviet Union) Nana Alexandria	(Soviet Union) Marta Litinskaya-Shul
1988	Tsqaltubo, Georgia		(Soviet Union) Nana Ioseliani	(Soviet Union) Elena Akhmilovskaya	(Soviet Union) Irina Levitina
1990	Borzomi, Georgia		(China) Xie Jun°	(Socialist Federal Republic of Yugoslavia) Alisa Marić	(Soviet Union) Alisa Galliamova
1992–93	Shanghai, China		(Georgia (country)) Nana Ioseliani	(Hungary) Zsuzsa Polgar	(Georgia (country)) Maia Chiburdanidze
1994–95	Tilburg, Netherlands		(Hungary) Zsuzsa Polgar°	(Georgia (country)) Maia Chiburdanidze	(Sweden) Pia Cramling
1997	Groningen, Netherlands		(China) Xie Jun°	(Russia) Alisa Galliamova	(Georgia (country)) Maia Chiburdanidze
2019	Kazan, Russia	€ 200,000	(Russia) Aleksandra Goryachkina	(Ukraine) Anna Muzychuk	(Russia) Kateryna Lagno
2022–23	Chongqing, China	€ 250,000	(China) Lei Tingjie	(China) Tan Zhongyi	(Ukraine) Anna Muzychuk (FIDE) Aleksandra Goryachkina
2024	Toronto, Canada	€ 250,000	(China) Tan Zhongyi	(India) Humpy Koneru	(China) Lei Tingjie
2026	Pegeia, Cyprus	€ 300,000	(India) Vaishali Rameshbabu	(Kazakhstan) Bibisara Assaubayeva	(China) Zhu Jiner

== See also ==
- FIDE Women's Grand Swiss Tournament
- Women's Chess World Cup
- Candidates Tournament
