= Women's World Chess Championship 1978 =

Women's World Chess Championship

The 1978 Women's World Chess Championship was won by Maia Chiburdanidze, who defeated the incumbent champion Nona Gaprindashvili At only 17 years of age, Chiburdanidze became the sixth and youngest Women's World Champion (Gaprindashvili had been 20 when she first won the title).

== 1976 Interzonals ==
For the first time, the women's cycle contained not one but two Interzonal tournaments, held in Roosendaal, Netherlands and Tbilisi, Georgian SSR in November and December 1976, featuring the best players from each FIDE zone. A total of 25 players took part, with the top three from each Interzonal qualifying for the Candidates Tournament.

Akhmilovskaya and former three-time challenger Kushnir (now representing Israel) shared first place in Roosendaal, while Lematschko took the third and last spot in the Candidates after a playoff against van der Mije.

In Tbilisi, Fatalibekova won, half a point ahead of Kozlovskaya and 15-year-old prodigy Chiburdanidze.

1976 Women's Interzonal, Roosendaal
	Player	1	2	3	4	5	6	7	8	9	10	11	12	13	14	Points	Tie break
1	Elena Akhmilovskaya (Soviet Union)	-	½	0	1	½	1	½	½	1	1	½	1	1	1	9½	54.25
2	Alla Kushnir (Israel)	½	-	½	0	1	½	½	1	1	1	1	½	1	1	9½	54.00
3	Alexandra van der Mije (Netherlands)	1	½	-	1	½	½	1	½	½	0	½	1	1	1	9	54.75
4	Tatjana Lematschko (Bulgaria)	0	1	0	-	0	1	½	1	1	1	½	1	1	1	9	49.00
5	Zsuzsa Veroci (Hungary)	½	0	½	1	-	½	1	0	½	1	½	1	1	1	8½	
6	Jana Malypetrová (England)	0	½	½	0	½	-	½	1	½	½	1	½	1	1	7½	
7	Liudmila Belavenets (Soviet Union)	½	½	0	½	0	½	-	½	½	1	1	½	½	1	7	
8	Tatyana Fomina (Soviet Union)	½	0	½	0	1	0	½	-	0	1	½	½	1	1	6½	34.75
9	Milunka Lazarević (Yugoslavia)	0	0	½	0	½	½	½	1	-	0	½	1	1	1	6½	32.50
10	Corry Vreeken (Netherlands)	0	0	1	0	0	½	0	0	1	-	1	½	1	½	5½	
11	Ruth Orton (USA)	½	0	½	½	½	0	0	½	½	0	-	1	0	1	5	
12	Maria Cristina de Oliveira (Brazil)	0	½	0	0	0	½	½	½	0	½	0	-	1	½	4	
13	Ilse de Caro (Colombia)	0	0	0	0	0	0	½	0	0	0	1	0	-	1	2½	
14	Rita Gramignani (Italy)	0	0	0	0	0	0	0	0	0	½	0	½	0	-	1	

1976 Women's Interzonal, Tbilisi
	Player	1	2	3	4	5	6	7	8	9	10	11	Points	Tie break
1	Elena Fatalibekova (Soviet Union)	-	½	1	½	½	½	½	1	½	1	1	7	
2	Maia Chiburdanidze (Soviet Union)	½	-	1	0	½	1	1	½	1	½	½	6½	31.25
3	Valentina Kozlovskaya (Soviet Union)	0	0	-	1	1	½	½	1	1	½	1	6½	28.75
4	Marta Litinskaya (Soviet Union)	½	1	0	-	1	½	½	½	0	1	1	6	28.00
5	Mária Ivánka (Hungary)	½	½	0	0	-	½	1	½	1	1	1	6	25.00
6	Tatiana Zatulovskaya (Soviet Union)	½	0	½	½	½	-	0	½	1	½	1	5	
7	Petra Feustel (East Germany)	½	0	½	½	0	1	-	½	½	0	1	4½	21.00
8	Gertrude Baumstark (Romania)	0	½	0	½	½	½	½	-	½	1	½	4½	20.00
9	Brigitte Hofmann (East Germany)	½	0	0	1	0	0	½	½	-	½	1	4	
10	Diane Savereide (USA)	0	½	½	0	0	½	1	0	½	-	0	3	
11	Narelle Kellner (Australia)	0	½	0	0	0	0	0	½	0	1	-	2	

== 1977-78 Candidates matches ==
The top three from each of the two Interzonals were joined by seeded players Alexandria and Levitina, the finalists from the last Candidates Tournament. These eight players contested a knock-out series of matches. Sixteen-year-old Chiburdanidze beat Kushnir in the final, earning the right to challenge reigning champion Gaprindashvili.

Quarterfinals
Tbilisi, Apr-May 1977
(Soviet Union) Maia Chiburdanidze	5½
(Soviet Union) Nana Alexandria	4½
Sofia, May–June 1977
(Soviet Union) Elena Akhmilovskaya	6½
(Bulgaria) Tatjana Lematschko	5½
Dortmund, May–June 1977
(Israel) Alla Kushnir	6
(Soviet Union) Irina Levitina	3
Sochi, Apr-May 1977
(Soviet Union) Elena Fatalibekova	6
(Soviet Union) Valentina Kozlovskaya	2

Semifinals
Tallinn, Sep–Oct 1977
(Soviet Union) Maia Chiburdanidze	6½
(Soviet Union) Elena Akhmilovskaya	5½
West Berlin, Sep–Oct 1977
(Israel) Alla Kushnir	6½
(Soviet Union) Elena Fatalibekova	3½

Final
Bad Kissingen, Jan 1978
(Soviet Union) Maia Chiburdanidze	7½
(Israel) Alla Kushnir	6½

== 1978 Championship Match ==
The championship match was played in Tbilisi from August 19 to October 12, 1978. A close match ended with a victory for 17-year-old Chiburdanidze against her twenty-year older opponent.

Women's World Championship Match 1978
	1	2	3	4	5	6	7	8	9	10	11	12	13	14	15	Total
Maia Chiburdanidze (Soviet Union)	½	½	½	1	1	½	0	½	1	½	0	½	1	½	½	8½
Nona Gaprindashvili (Soviet Union)	½	½	½	0	0	½	1	½	0	½	1	½	0	½	½	6½
