= European Senior Chess Championship =

The European Senior Chess Championship is a chess tournament for senior chess players organised by the European Chess Union (ECU). Beginning in 2001, entry was open to men aged sixty or over (60 +) by January 1 of the year the tournament starts. The corresponding, women's category had an age restriction of fifty years or over (50+).

In 2014 the competition was split into separate tournaments for the age categories of 65+ and 50+ and these age restrictions were unified across both genders. The format of each tournament is a 9-round Swiss, the overall winners being awarded the respective titles of "European Senior Chess Champion" and "European Senior Women's Chess Champion" in each age category. Similar titles are awarded for rapidplay and blitz, but these are not shown below.

== List of winners ==
#	Year	Location	Overall winner	Women champion
1	2001	(Italy) St. Vincent	Jacob Murey (ISR)	Valeria Dotan (ISR)
2	2002	(Italy) St. Vincent	Vladimir Bukal (CRO)	Hanna Ereńska-Barlo (POL)
3	2003	(Italy) St. Vincent	Sinisa Joksic (SCG)	Vlasta Maček (CRO)
4	2004	(Italy) Arvier	Mark Tseitlin (ISR)	Radmila Popivoda (ISR)
5	2005	(Germany) Bad Homburg	Mark Tseitlin (ISR)	Hanna Ereńska-Barlo (POL)
6	2006	(Switzerland) Davos	Borislav Ivkov (SRB)	Valeria Dotan (ISR)
7	2007	(Germany) Hockenheim	Nukhim Rashkovsky (RUS)	Elena Fatalibekova (RUS)
8	2008	(Switzerland) Davos	Mark Tseitlin (ISR)	Elena Fatalibekova (RUS)
9	2009	(Slovenia) Rogaška Slatina	Vitaly Tseshkovsky (RUS)	Ludmila Saunina (RUS)
10	2010	(Greece) Thessaloniki	Vitaly Tseshkovsky (RUS)	Tamar Khmiadashvili (GEO)
11	2011	(Italy) Courmayeur	Mihai Șubă (ROU)	Nona Gaprindashvili (GEO)
12	2012	(Lithuania) Kaunas	Nikolai Pushkov (RUS)	Tatyana Fomina (EST)
13	2013	(Bulgaria) Plovdiv	Mark Tseitlin (ISR)	Margarita Voiska (BUL)
14	2014	(Portugal) Porto	Nico Schouten (NED) (65+); Keith Arkell (ENG) (50+)	Valentina Kozlovskaya (RUS) (65+); Tatyana Fomina (EST) (50+)
15	2015	(Greece) Eretria	Jan Rooze (BEL) (65+); Zurab Sturua (GEO) (50+)	Nona Gaprindashvili (GEO) (65+); Svetlana Mednikova (RUS) (50+)
16	2016	(Armenia) Yerevan	Valentin Bogdanov (UKR) (65+); Zurab Sturua (GEO) (50+)	Nona Gaprindashvili (GEO) (65+); Galina Strutinskaya (RUS) (50+)
17	2017	(Spain) Sabadell	Nils-Gustaf Renman (SWE) (65+); Karen Movsziszian (ARM) (50+)	Nona Gaprindashvili (GEO) (65+); Galina Strutinskaya (RUS) (50+)
18	2018	(Norway) Drammen	Vladislav Vorotnikov (RUS) (65+); Simen Agdestein (NOR) (50+)	Nona Gaprindashvili (GEO) (65+); Brigitte Burchardt (GER) (50+)
19	2019	(Greece) Rhodes	Jens Kristiansen (DEN) (65+); Zurab Sturua (GEO) (50+)	Elena Fatalibekova (RUS) (65+); Tatiana Grabuzova (RUS) (50+)
20	2021	(Italy) Budoni	Nathan Birnboim (ISR) (65+); Fabrizio Bellia (ITA) (50+)	Annett Wagner-Michel (GER) (65+); Elena Krasenkova (RUS) (50+)
21	2022	(Poland) Lublin	Nils-Gustaf Renman (SWE) (65+); Martin Mrva (SVK) (50+)	Annett Wagner-Michel (GER) (65+); Sopiko Teraladze (GEO) (50+)
22	2023	(Italy) Acqui Terme	John Nunn (ENG) (65+); Zurab Sturua (GEO) (50+)	Gisela Fischdick (GER) (65+); Silvia Alexieva (FRA) (50+)
23	2024	(Italy) Lignano Sabbiadoro	Zurab Sturua (GEO) (65+); Mikheil Kekelidze (GEO) (50+)	Brigitte Burchardt (GER) (65+); Marina Makropoulou (GRE) (50+)
24	2025	(Croatia) Rabac	Zurab Sturua (GEO) (65+); Jean-Marc Degraeve (FRA) (50+)	Ligia-Letitia Jicman (ROU) (65+); Gundula Heinatz (SUI) (50+)
25	2026	(Italy) Acqui Terme	Zurab Sturua (GEO) (65+); Jean-Marc Degraeve (FRA) (50+)	Elena Krasenkowa (POL) (65+); Silvia Alexieva (FRA) (50+)

== See also ==
- World Senior Chess Championship
- European Individual Chess Championship
- European Junior Chess Championship
- European Youth Chess Championship
- Asian Senior Chess Championship
