= Vladimir Bukal =

Croatian chess player (1939–2008)

Personal information
- Born: November 1, 1939
- Died: August 21, 2008 (aged 68) Zagreb, Croatia

Chess career
- Country: Croatia
- Title: International Master (1986)
- Peak rating: 2465 (January 1986)

Vladimir Bukal (November 1, 1939 – August 21, 2008) was a Croatian chess player holding the title of International master.

He played in many Yugoslav and Croatian championships, winning the latter in 1978.

In 1985 he won the B-section of the "Banco di Roma" tournament in Rome (Ulf Andersson won the A-section). Twice winner of the B-section of the Reggio Emilia chess tournament (1988/89 and 1989/90).

Bukal achieved his best results in Senior tournaments:

- 2001 – bronze medal at the World Senior Championship at Arco (Janis Klovans won the event);
- 2002 – gold medal at the European Senior Championship at Saint-Vincent;
- 2003 – bronze medal at the World Senior Championship at Bad Zwischenahn (Yuri Shabanov won the event).

He was a member of the HAŠK Mladost Zagreb chess club.

His son Vladimir Bukal Jr. (born in 1975) is also an International master.
