= Elena Fatalibekova =

Russian chess player (born 1947)

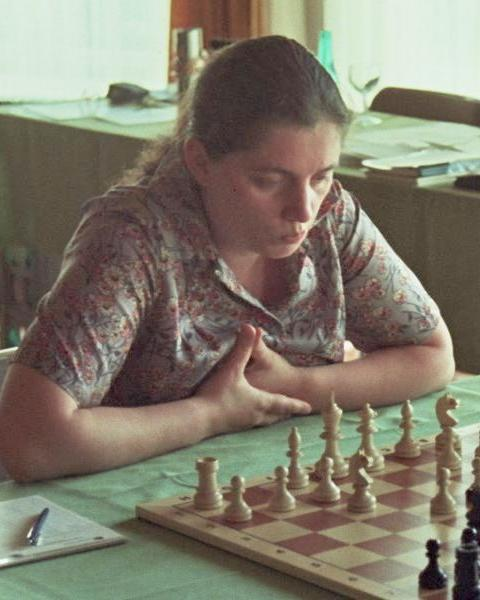
- Fatalibekova in Bad Kissingen, 1982

Personal information
- Born: Elena Abramovna Fatalibekova; 4 October 1947 (age 78) Moscow, Soviet Union

Chess career
- Country: Russia
- Title: Woman Grandmaster (1977)
- Peak rating: 2317 (July 2003)

Elena Abramovna Fatalibekova (Russian: Елена Абрамовна Фаталибекова; née Rubtsova; born 4 October 1947, in Moscow) is a Russian chess player holding the title of Woman Grandmaster (WGM) since 1977.

She is the daughter of fourth Women's World Chess Champion Olga Rubtsova and chess master Abram Polyak. Her first great success was the shared victory of the Soviet Junior Girls' Chess Championship in 1963.

In 1970 Fatalibekova placed second in a women's international tournament at Tbilisi and the next year won international tournament in Chelyabinsk. She was awarded the title of Woman International Master in 1970. In 1974 Fatalibekova won the Women's Soviet Chess Championship.

Fatalibekova successfully played in the Women's World Chess Championship 1978. In 1976 she won the Tbilisi Women's Interzonal (ahead of Maia Chiburdanidze). In 1977 in the first round of the knock-out series of matches Fatalibekova won against Valentina Kozlovskaya in Sochi - 6 : 2 (+4 −0 =4) but in the semifinals lost to Alla Kushnir in West Berlin - 3½ : 6½ (+2 −5 =3). Fatalibekova was awarded the title of Woman Grandmaster in 1977.

She was not able to replicate this success in later Women's World Chess Championships. Fatalibekova placed 6th in the 1979 Women's Interzonal in Alicante and 8th in the 1982 Women's Interzonal in Bad Kissingen.

In 1994, Fatalibekova competed at the 31st Chess Olympiad for the Russian women's team, which also included Irina Kulish, Galina Strutinskaya, and Tatiana Roschina. She is three-time winner of the Women's World Senior Chess Championship (2000, 2001, 2004) and two-time winner of the Women's European Senior Chess Championship (2007, 2008).
