= Alexander Reprintsev =

Ukrainian chess player (born 1958)

Personal information
- Born: December 8, 1958 (age 67) Dnipropetrovsk, Ukrainian SSR, Soviet Union

Chess career
- Country: Ukraine
- Title: International Master (1999)
- Peak rating: 2470 (January 1999)

Alexander Vasilyevich Reprintsev is a Ukrainian chess player.

== Chess career ==
In June 2024, he won the Golden Prague Blitz Rating Open with an undefeated score of 10/11, also scoring one full point ahead of the runner-up.

In November 2025, he won the 65+ section of the World Senior Chess Championship. He had tied with five other players (including grandmasters Zurab Sturua and Nikolay Legky) but won due to tiebreak scores.
