= Nikolay Legky =

Ukrainian-French chess grandmaster (born 1955)

Personal information
- Born: April 11, 1955 (age 71) Odesa, Ukrainian SSR, Soviet Union

Chess career
- Country: Soviet Union (until 1991); Ukraine (1992–2010); France (since 2010)
- Title: Grandmaster (1994)
- Peak rating: 2540 (July 1996)

Nikolay Anatoliyovych Legky is a Ukrainian chess grandmaster who plays for France.

== Chess career ==
In November 2022, he tied for second place with Jose Fernandez Garcia, Jens Kristiansen, and Nils-Gustaf Renman at the World Senior Chess Championship, ultimately being ranked in third place after tiebreak scores.

In November 2022, he tied for third place with Rainer Knaak, Daniel Campora, Rafael Vaganian, and Alexander Reprintsev at the World Senior Chess Championship, ultimately being ranked in third place after tiebreak scores.
