= Yuri Shabanov =

Russian chess grandmaster (1937–2010)

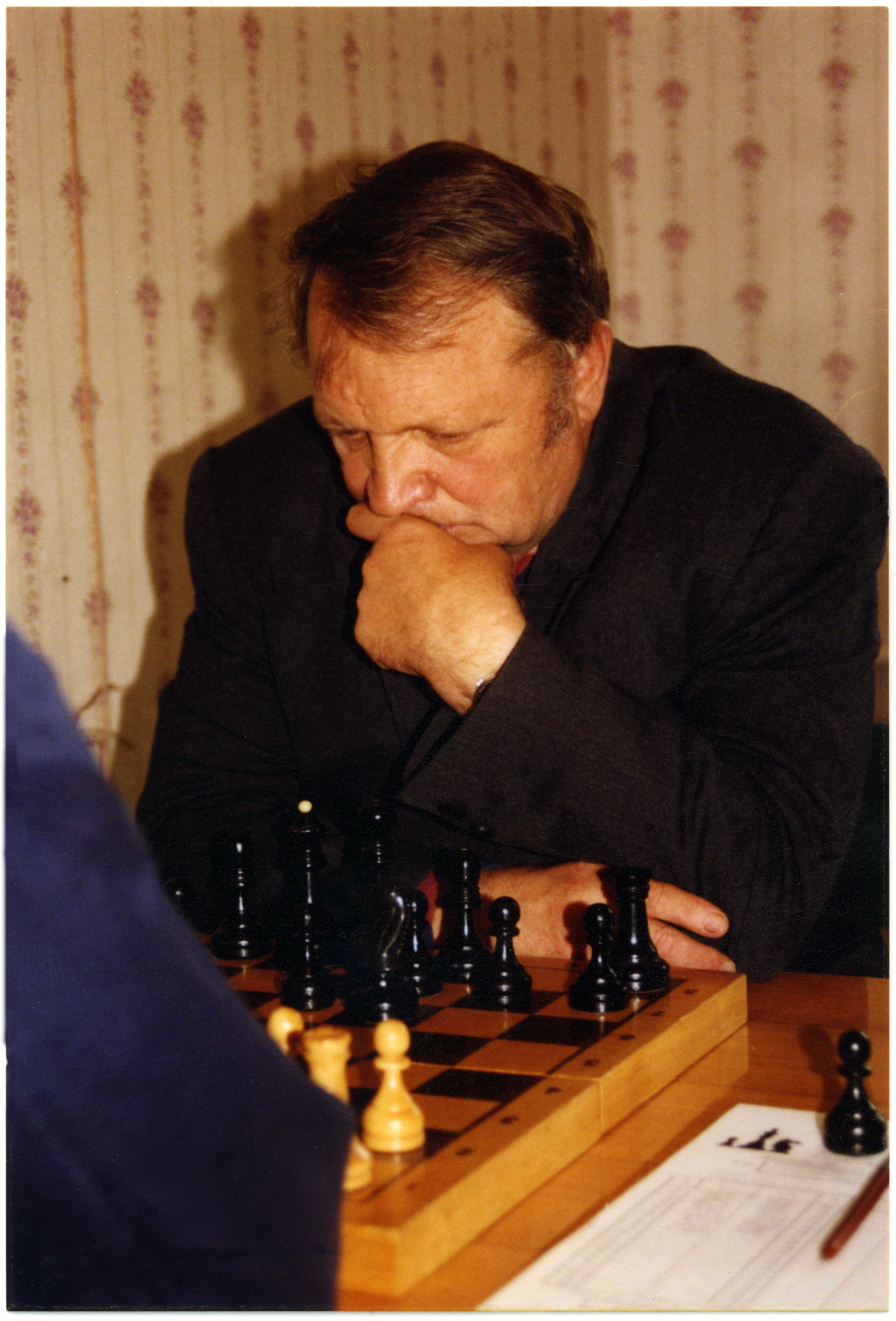
- Shabanov in 1995

Personal information
- Born: 11 November 1937 Khabarovsk, USSR
- Died: 30 March 2010 (aged 72) Moscow, Russia

Chess career
- Country: Soviet Union; Russia
- Title: Grandmaster (2003)
- Peak rating: 2505 (January 2001)

Yuri Fedorovich Shabanov (Russian: Юрий Фёдорович Шабанов, 11 November 1937 Khabarovsk – 30 March 2010, Moscow) was a Soviet and Russian chess Grandmaster (2003), arbiter of the republican category (1997).

Two-time world senior chess champion: Bad Zwischenahn (2003) and Halle (2004). Three-time European champion in the team of Russian seniors (2001, 2002 and 2006). Three-time Moscow senior chess champion (2005, 2006 and 2007). Russian senior chess champion (1999). Champion of the Far East (1961). Multiple champion of the Magadan - Far North region (1961-1980).

== Biography ==
Yuri Fedorovich Shabanov was born in the family of the editor-in-chief of a Far Eastern publishing house in 1937. He grew up practically without a father, since his father died during the World War II. His family moved from Khabarovsk after the end of the war. First, they moved to Nizhneudinsk, Irkutsk Region, later they moved to Lviv. Shabanov started to learn chess in 1951.

The young first-ranked player eventually played at the All-Union Youth Olympiad in Kiev as a part of the Ukrainian team in 1954. He scored 7 points out of 9 and took the second place in the semifinals. He scored 8.5 points out of 12 and took the third place in the final.

The All-Union Youth Championship took place in the city of Leningrad at the same year. Yuri played for the team of Ukraine on the third board. The team shared 4th and 5th place with the Leningrad team. Boris Spassky, Mikhail Tal, Edward Gufeld and others took part in this tournament, but Yuri Shabanov did not meet them.

Further, he became the winner of the regional chess championship in the city of Khabarovsk in 1955. Yuri scored 9 points out of 10 and took the first place. A zonal competition of the leading chess players of the Khabarovsk and Primorye Territories, Amur, Sakhalin and other regions was held in the city of Blagoveshchensk in 1957. At this time, Yuri Shabanov was a student of the Magadan mining technical school and became a candidate for the USSR Master of Sports after he scored 12 points out of 17 and took the first place. Later he got the right to participate in the 17th championship of the RSFSR, which was held in the city of Chelyabinsk. Yuri scored 10.5 points out of 19 and took 6-9 place.

Shabanov repeatedly won the Far Eastern semi-finals of the RSFSR, and participated in Russian championships. He became a multiple champion of the Magadan Region since 1960. Yuri was awarded a diploma in geology and worked in his specialty, so he didn't have much time to play chess. Only after the 1964 Trud Championship, where Yuri took the first place and became the first player ever from the Magadan region to get the title of the USSR Master of Sports, chess come to the fore of his life.

The practical strength of Yuri Shabanov grew. He was one of the strongest chess masters in the 70s. He won the finals of the Trud Championship again in 1978. Yuri participated in the semifinals of the USSR regularly, but every time he lacks something for a decisive step. Only after moving to Yaroslavl, where Shabanov worked as an instructor at the Children's and Youth Sports School, Yuri Fedorovich fulfilled his dream and entered in the First League of the Soviet Championship, where he took the fifth place in the 80s.

Shabanov became an international master in the 90s. He joined the powerful Russian senior chess movement and lived in Moscow since 2000s. He took part in the team championships of Moscow 2004-2008. He participated in six European Championships as a part of Russian seniors team in 2001, 2002, 2004, 2006, 2007 and 2008. He participated in the championships of Russia among seniors in 1999-2007. He also took part in the Moscow Senior Chess Championship in 2003–2007. He participated in the traditional matches of the Moscow-St. Petersburg as part of the Moscow team in 2002 and 2005.

Shabanov was awarded the title of international grandmaster for the victory at the 13th World Senior Chess Championship in 2003. He repeated his success and became a two-time world senior chess champion at the 14th World Senior Chess Championship in 2004.

He stopped participating in major chess competitions due to a serious illness since 2008.

Shabanov had a strong interest in chess.

I can’t tell that his name was widely known in the media. The reasons were his exceptional modesty, desire to remain in the shadows and absolute lack of conflict. Meanwhile, Yuri Fedorovich is a two-time world champion among seniors, a multiple European champion in the national team of Russian seniors, a champion of Russia among seniors and one of the strongest masters of the RSFSR in the 70s, when he lived in distant Magadan. We were acquainted with Yuri Fedorovich a long time ago, but seniors chess brought us together. We made friends, lived together in hotels, analyzed, communicated and empathized. He was erudite, and principled, he loved chess selflessly.

— Oleg Chernikov

Yuri Shabanov died on March 30, 2010.

== Sports Achievements ==
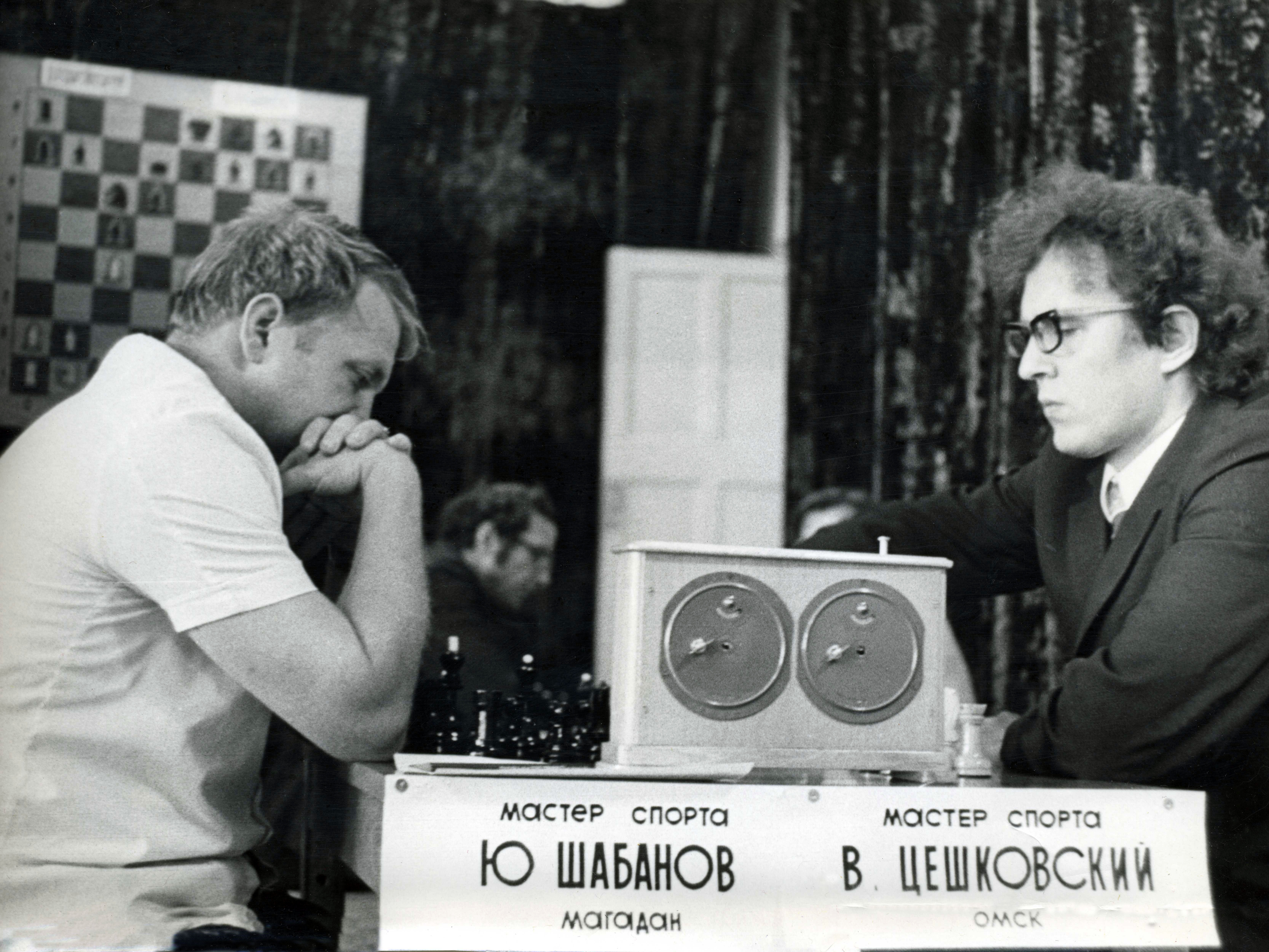
Yuri at the RSFSR Championship in Omsk during a game against Vitaly Tseshkovsky in 1973 (at the right).

Year	City	Championship	+	−	=	Result	Place
1956	Irkutsk	Zone RSFSR tournament of Siberia and the Far East				9½ of 13	III-IV
1957	Blagoveshchensk	Zone RSFSR tournament of Siberia and the Far East				12 of 17	I
1957	Chelyabinsk	17th RSFSR Championship (Chelyabinsk Semifinal)				10½ of 19	VI-IX
1957		Awarded the title of the USSR Candidate Master of Sports					
1959	Blagoveshchensk	Games of the RSFSR (Far Eastern Zone)				6½ of 8	I
1961	Khabarovsk	Championship of the Far East				10½ of 13	I
1963	Rostov-on-Don	1/2 Finals of CS DSO Trud				10 of 13	I
1964	Kamensk	III Finals of CS DSO Trud				12½ of 17	I-II
1964		He fulfilled requirements for the USSR Master of Sports					
1964	Riga	Small Championship of the VCSPS (Group II)				6 of 9	II
1965	Cheboksary	Semifinal of the 33th USSR Championship				9 of 16	VII-VIII
1967	Leningrad	Finals of the RSFSR Games				6½ of 11	
1969	Sverdlovsk	Qualifying tournament for the 37th USSR Championship				12 of 17	I-III
1969	Barnaul	Semifinal of the 37th USSR Championship				9 of 17	VIII-IX
1971	Moscow	Finals of CS DSO Trud (1/4 USSR Final)				10 of 17	III-V
1971	Daugavpils	USSR Championship Semifinal				8½ of 17	VII-VIII
1972	Rostov	Finals of the RSFSR Championship, 1/4 USSR Finals				11 of 19	V-VI
1972	Uzhhorod	USSR Championship Semifinal				10½ of 17	II-V
1973	Omsk	Finals of the 29 RSFSR championship				6 of 15	13
1973	Frunze	USSR semi-final				7½ of 15	IX-XI
1974	Tula	30th RSFSR Championship				5½ of 15	13-14
1977	Bălți	Qualifying tournament for the USSR Championship				5½ of 13	
1978	Astrakhan	Finals of CS DSO Trud				10½ of 15	I-II
1978	Krasnodar	Finals of the 7th RSFSR Spartakiad				6½ of 11	VII
1981	Vladimir	35th RSFSR Championship				8 of 15	VII
1982	Stavropol	36th RSFSR Championship				7 of 14	IX-X
1983	Krasnodar	Finals of the 8th RSFSR Spartakiad				5 of 11	IX
1985	Berdyansk	IV Finals of VS DSO Trud				8½ of 15	III
1985	Kostroma	Qualifying tournament of the 53 USSR Championship	1	1	15	8½ of 17	VIII-X
1985	Tbilisi	Alexander Kotov Memorial	3	0	8	7 of 11	II
1987	Kursk	Championship of the RSFSR	4	2	11	9½ of 17	VI-IX
1990	Yaroslavl	International tournament "Yaroslavl-90"	3	1	6	6 of 10	II-VI
1990	Kuybyshev	43rd Championship of the RSFSR	2	2	11	7½ of 15	VIII
1990	Sochi	Michael Chigorin Memorial	3	1	7	6½ of 11	V
1991	Sochi	International Tournament				6½ of 11	IV-VI
1992	Oryol	45th Russian Championship	2	2	7	5½ of 11	IX-XII
1996	Elista	49th Russian Championship	2	3	6	5 of 11	40
1999	Moscow	Finals of the Russian Senior Chess Championship				7½ of 9	I
1999	Gladenbach	9th World Senior Chess Championship	6	1	4	8 of 11	V-XI
2000	Rowy	10th World Senior Chess Championship				8 of 11	IV
2001	Dresden	European Senior Team Chess Championship				5½ of 7	I
2001	Arco	11th World Senior Chess Championship				8 of 11	IV-X
2002	Dresden	European Senior Team Chess Championship				5 of 6	I
2003	Ashdod	International Open Chess Championship in Israel				5 of 9	41
2003	Tula	Michael Botvinnik Memorial among seniors				6½ of 10	I
2003	Bad Zwischenahn	13th World Senior Chess Championship	7	0	4	9 of 11	I
2004	Dresden	European Senior Team Chess Championship				4½ of 7	III
2004	Arvier	4th European Senior Chess Championship				6 of 9	VI
2004	Halle	14th World Senior Chess Championship	6	0	5	8½ of 11	I
2005	Moscow	Moscow Senior Chess Championship				7½	I
2006	Dresden	European Senior Team Chess Championship				4½ of 7	I
2006	Moscow	II International Chess Festival Moscow Open 2006 (Tournament A - Senior)				5½	I
2006	Moscow	Moscow Senior Chess Championship				6	I
2007	Moscow	III International Chess Festival Moscow Open 2007 (Tournament A - Senior)				5	I
2007	Moscow	Moscow Senior Chess Championship				6	I
2007	Dresden	European Senior Team Chess Championship				6 of 8	II
2007	Gmunden	17th World Senior Chess Championship	6	0	5	8½ of 11	II-IV
2008	Dresden	European Senior Team Chess Championship				6½ of 9	III
