= Agadmator =

Croatian YouTuber and chess player (born 1987)

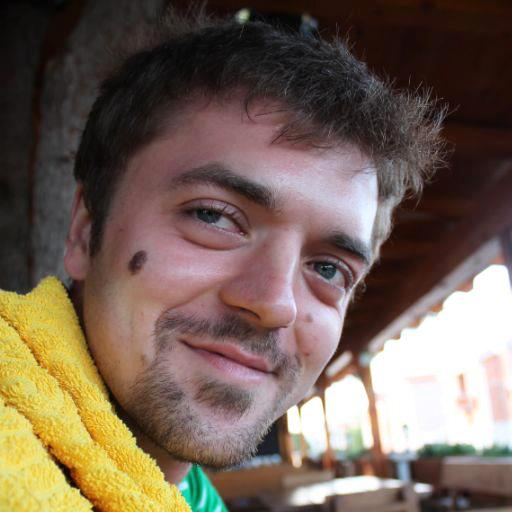
- Radić's profile picture on Chess.com
- Born: Antonio Radić; 16 June 1987 (age 39); Križevci, Croatia
- Chess career
- Country: Croatia
- FIDE rating: 1954 (May 2025)
- Peak rating: 2010 (July 2010)

YouTube information
- Channel: agadmator
- Years active: 2016–present
- Subscribers: 1.4 million
- Views: 840 million
- Last updated: 6 April 2026

Antonio Radić (born 16 June 1987), better known as agadmator (Croatian pronunciation: [agad'mator̩]), is a Croatian YouTuber and chess player. He has one of the most popular chess channels on YouTube, and was the most subscribed chess YouTuber from 2018 to late 2021, when he became the first chess content creator to cross the million-subscriber mark. He was eventually surpassed by GothamChess. Although he does not participate in many international chess tournaments, he is active on various online chess platforms, including Lichess and Chess.com. On his channel, Radić reviews recent tournament games from top players, historical matches, and chess compositions. He occasionally features his own real-time rapid games, played on Lichess.

== Background ==
Radić is a resident of Križevci, Croatia, and was introduced to chess at the age of four by his grandfather Anto Krnjić, a FIDE Master. He later stopped playing and did not return to chess until he was 17 years old.

== YouTube channel ==
Radić created his YouTube channel in 2007 while he was working with his father, who had a job as a wedding videographer, posting wedding videos to promote their business. He began posting chess videos in 2016. Once he reached 20,000 subscribers, he left his job as a graphic designer for his father's wedding photography business to focus on the channel full-time. Almost all of Radić's videos follow the same format: a detailed analysis of one chess game. He typically posts new videos on a daily basis and consistently reviews games from big tournaments within 24 hours. Many of his reviews of historical games are organized into series; for example, games from the World Chess Championship 1921 match. His most popular video, titled "The Greatest Queen Sacrifice in Chess History", has over 7.5 million views as of August 2025. In the video, he analyzes a game between Rashid Nezhmetdinov and Oleg Chernikov from 1962. On 7 February 2021, he became the first chess content creator to cross the million-subscriber mark.

In 2020, Radić started a podcast called The agadmator Podcast, which is hosted on his YouTube channel and various other platforms. He also has a second channel, "Agadmator's Other Channel", where he plays various video games; namely, Hearthstone and Zelda II: The Adventure of Link.
