= Karen Movsziszian =

Armenian chess grandmaster (born 1963)

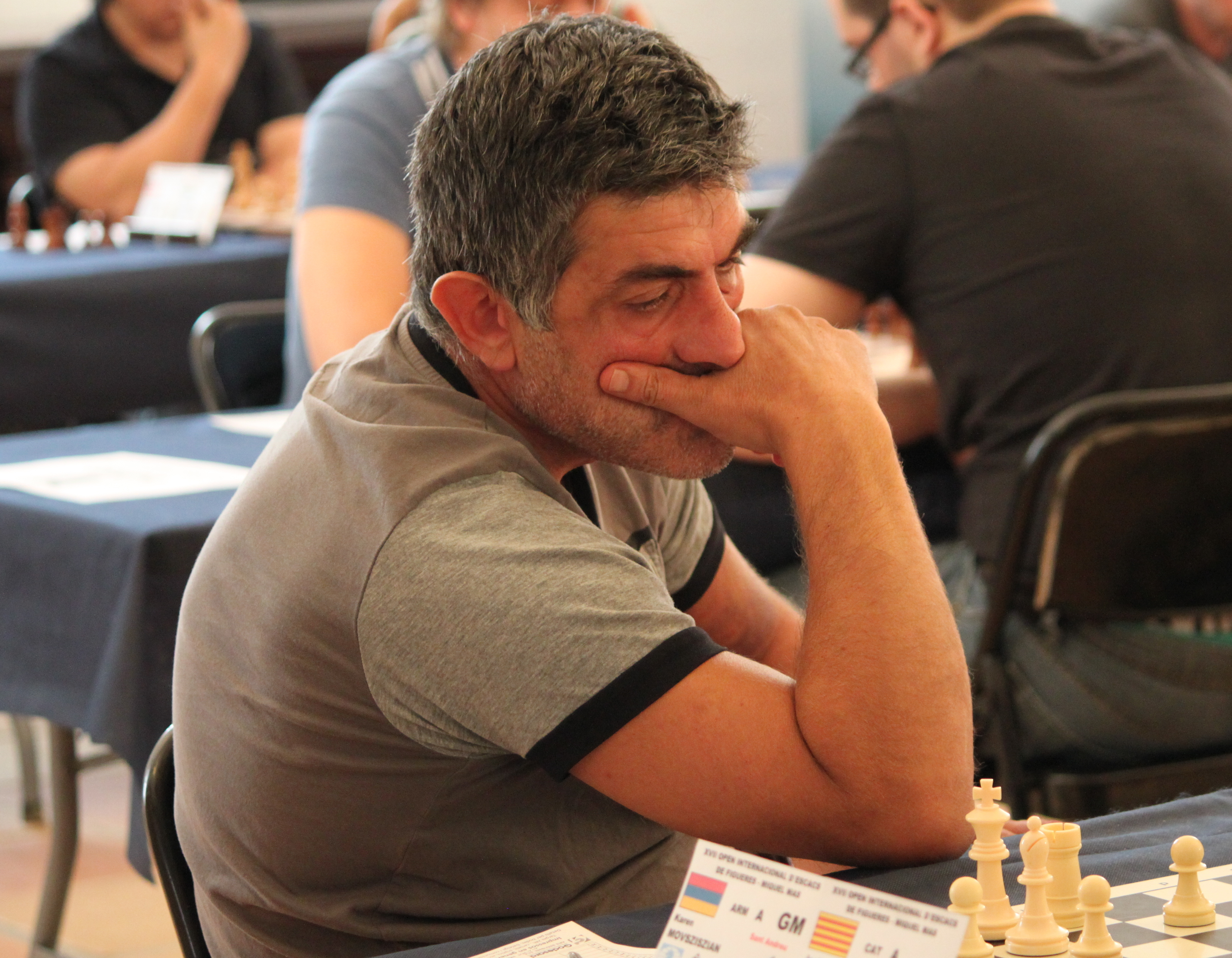

Personal information
- Born: January 6, 1963 (age 63) Yerevan, Armenia

Chess career
- Country: Armenia
- Title: Grandmaster (1994)
- Peak rating: 2570 (July 2009)

Karen Movsziszian (Armenian: Կարեն Մովսիսյան, born January 6, 1963) is an Armenian chess Grandmaster (1994). He played for Germany from 1993 to 1997 and lives in Spain. He won the Armenian Chess Championship in 1981, the European Senior Chess Championship (50+) in 2017 and the World Senior Chess Championship (50+) in 2018.

== Achievements ==
- 2007: Third at La Pobla de Lillet Open
- 2011: First at Sant Boi de Llobregat Open
- 2014: First at Vallfogona de Balaguer Open
- 2015: First at Vallfogona de Balaguer Open
- 2016: First at Sitges Open
- 2016: First at La Pobla de Lillet Open
