= Tamar Khmiadashvili =

Georgian chess player (1944–2019)

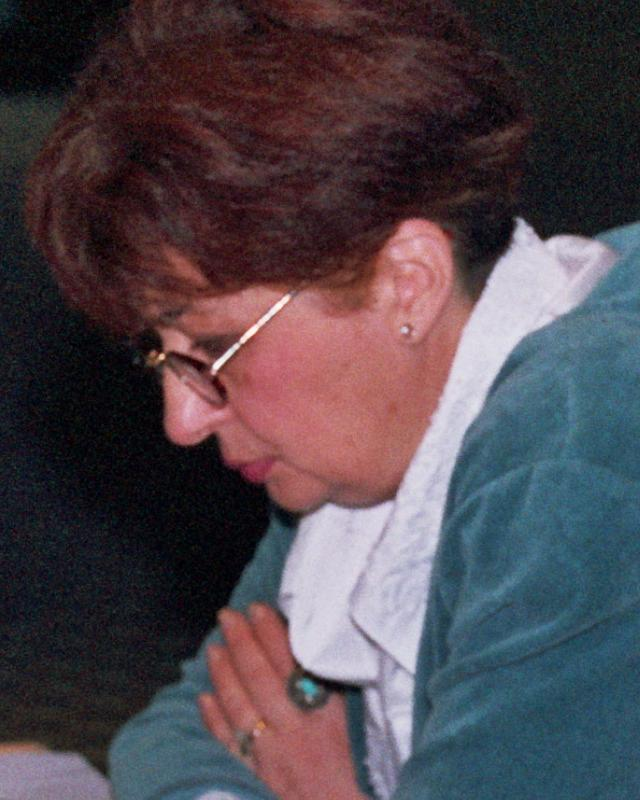
- Khmiadashvili in 1996

Personal information
- Born: 27 November 1944 Tbilisi, Georgian SSR, Soviet Union
- Died: 2019 (aged 74–75)

Chess career
- Country: Soviet Union → Georgia
- Title: Woman Grandmaster (1998)
- Peak rating: 2249 (January 2001)

Tamar Khmiadashvili (Georgian: თამარ ხმიადაშვილი; 27 November 1944 – 2019) was a Georgian chess player, who was awarded the title of Woman Grandmaster (WGM) by FIDE in 1998 for winning Women's Senior Chess Championship. She won the Georgian Women's Championship in 1972, 1975 and 1978, the European Women's Senior Championship in 2010, and the World Women's Senior Championship in 1998, 1999, 2003, 2010 and 2017 (in the 65+ age category). She placed second in the latter event in 1995–1997. In 2007, she was also accorded the FIDE Arbiter title.

Khmiadashvili was fluent in German. She worked as a chess coach in her native city of Tbilisi and was never married.
