= Svetlana Mednikova =

Russian chess player (born 1956)

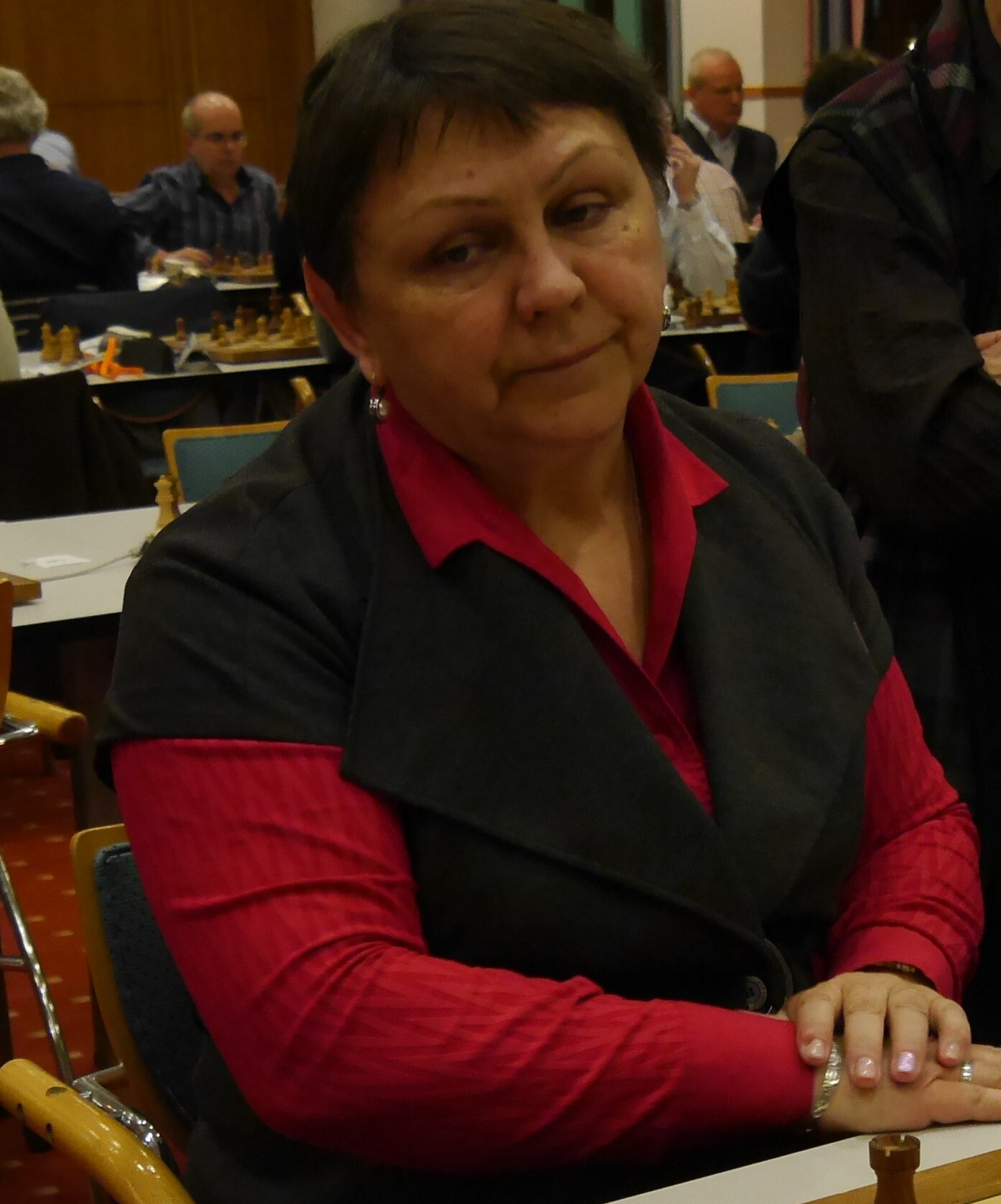
- Mednikova in 2016

Personal information
- Born: April 9, 1956 (age 70) Starokostiantyniv, Russian SFSR, Soviet Union

Chess career
- Country: Soviet Union (until 1991); Russia (since 1991)
- Title: Woman Grandmaster (2014)
- Peak rating: 2205 (December 2014)

Svetlana Vasilyevna Mednikova is a Russian chess player.

== Chess career ==
In November 2014, she won the World Senior Women's Chess Championship ahead of Yelena Ankudinova and Nino Melashvili.

In June 2016, she won the bronze medal in the 50+ category of the European Senior Women's Chess Championship.

In August 2018, she tied for third place with Sylvia Johnsen and Annet Wagner-Michel in the European Senior Women's Chess Championship, ultimately placing 5th after tiebreaks.

In April 2019, she finished in third place in the 50+ category of the European Senior Women's Chess Championship.
