= Vladimir Okhotnik =

Ukrainian-French chess grandmaster (born 1950)

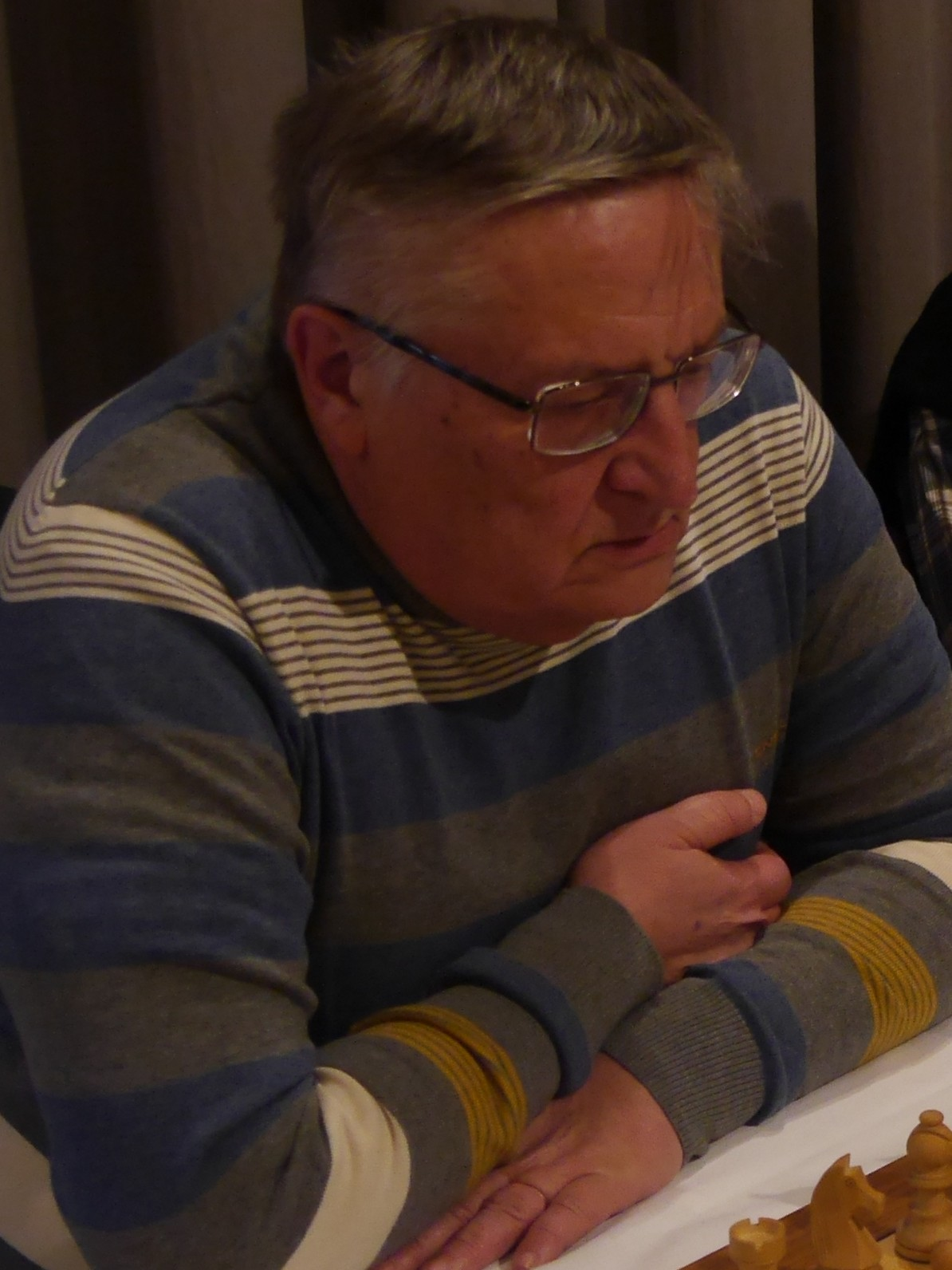

Personal information
- Born: Volodymyr Illich Okhotnyk; 28 February 1950 (age 76) Kyiv, Ukrainian SSR, Soviet Union

Chess career
- Country: Soviet Union (before 1991); France (after 1991)
- Title: Grandmaster (2011)
- Peak rating: 2510 (July 2000)

Vladimir Okhotnik (Ukrainian: Володимир Ілліч Охотник, romanized: Volodymyr Illich Okhotnyk; born 28 February 1950) is a French chess player of Ukrainian origin.

In 1979 he won the 44th Ukrainian championship at Dnipropetrovsk. In 2011 he won the World Senior Championship and this achievement automatically earned him the title of Grandmaster. Okhotnik won his second world senior title (in the 65+ category) in 2015.

Tournament results include the following:

- 1984: first at Mezőhegyes
- 1986: equal 2nd at Satu Mare
- 1987: first at Samos; 4th at Halle
- 1988: first at the Cappelle-la-Grande Open
- 2012: equal first at Villach

In the 1990s he moved to France, taking up French nationality.

Together with Bogdan Lalić, he wrote two chess books:

- Carpathian Warrior book one. Secrets of a Master, Pandora Press, 2005 (370 pp.), covering the Pirc, the Modern Defense, the Czech and the Philidor
- Carpathian Warrior 2, Pandora Press, 2008, covering lesser known lines vs. the Pirc and the Modern, as well as other Black systems with a king's side fianchetto.
