= Tatiana Bogumil =

Russian chess player (born 1958)

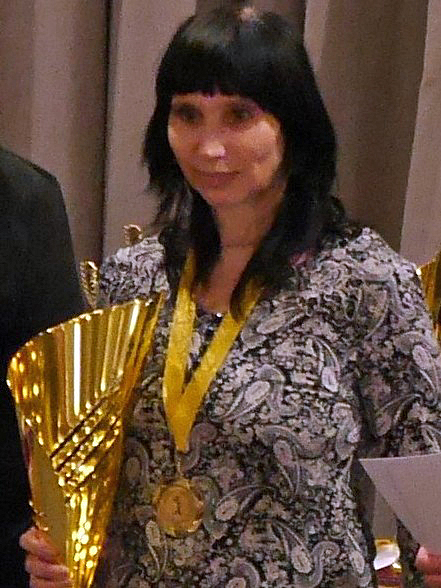

Personal information
- Born: March 16, 1958 (age 68) Jambyl Region, Kazakh SSR, Soviet Union

Chess career
- Country: Soviet Union (until 1991); Russia (since 1991)
- Title: Woman Grandmaster (2016)
- Peak rating: 2218 (January 2009)

Tatiana Andreyevna Bogumil is a Russian chess player.

== Chess career ==
In November 2016, she won the 50+ category of the World Senior Women's Chess Championship, notably defeating top seed Elvira Berend in the eighth round.

In November 2019, she was the tournament leader for the World Senior Women's Chess Championship for the majority of the event, but lost to Tatiana Grabuzova in the tenth round and ultimately finished in second place in the tournament.

In October 2022, she finished in third place in the Russian Senior Women's Rapid Chess Championship.

In November 2023, she finished in third place in the 65+ category of the World Senior Women's Chess Championship.
