= Anatoly Vaisser =

French chess grandmaster (born 1949)

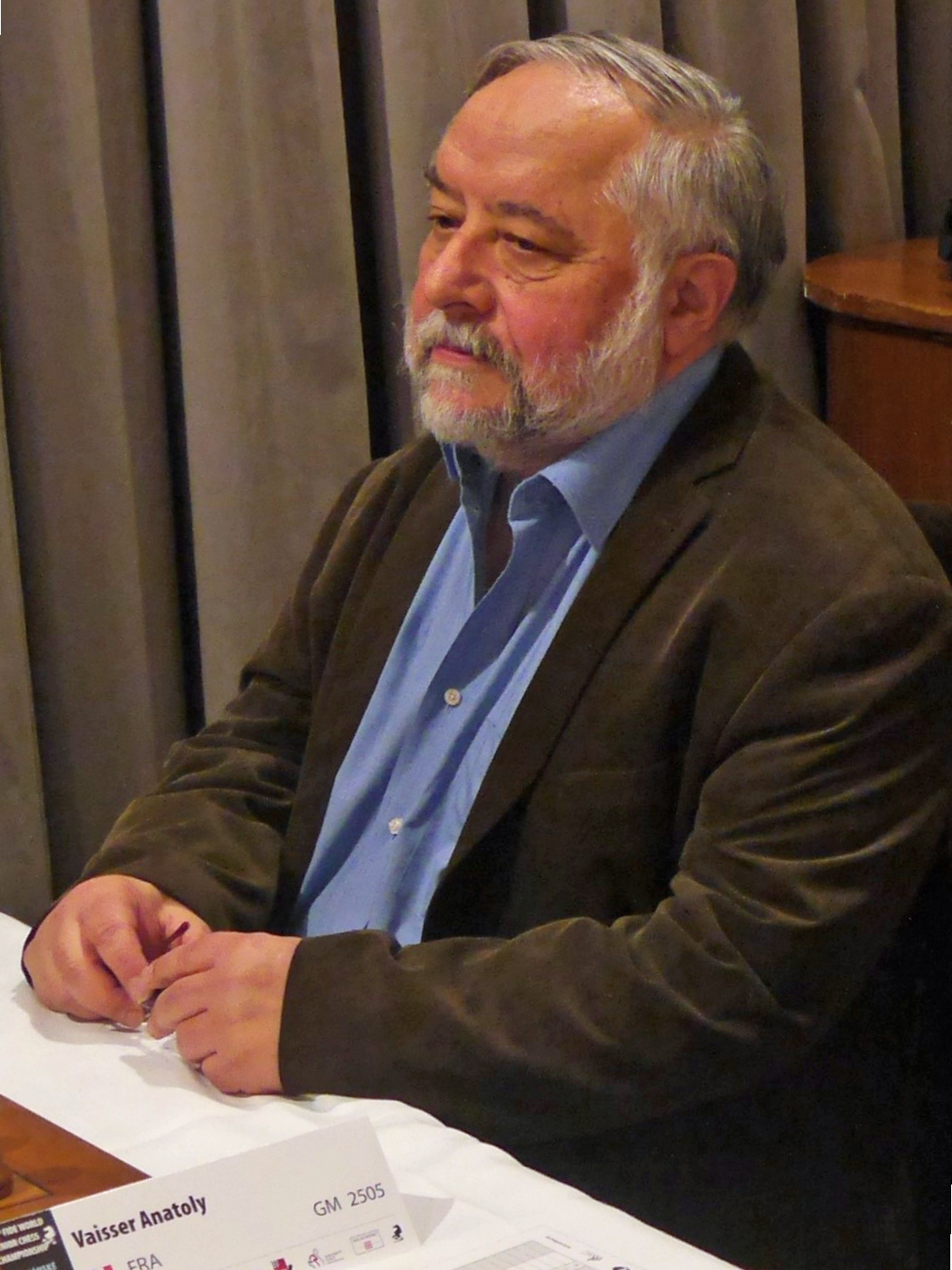
- Anatoly Vaisser, 2016 at World Seniors in Mariánské Lázně

Personal information
- Born: March 5, 1949 (age 77) Almaty, Kazakh SSR, Soviet Union

Chess career
- Country: France (after 1991); Soviet Union (before 1991)
- Title: Grandmaster (1985)
- FIDE rating: 2407 (September 2026)
- Peak rating: 2595 (January 1998)
- Peak ranking: No. 50 (July 1983)

Anatoly Vaisser (born 5 March 1949) is a Soviet-born French chess player. Awarded the title Grandmaster by FIDE in 1985, he is four-time world seniors' champion.

== Biography and career ==
Vaisser was born in Almaty, Kazakhstan (then Soviet Union). In 1982 he won the Russian Chess Championship. FIDE awarded him the titles of International Master (IM) in 1982 and Grandmaster (GM) in 1985.

Vaisser shared first place with Evgeny Sveshnikov at the Chigorin Memorial in Sochi in 1983, tied for 2nd–3rd with Viswanathan Anand, behind István Csom, at New Delhi in 1987, and took second, behind Vladimir Malaniuk, at Budapest in 1989. He tied for first in the Cappelle-la-Grande Open twice: in 1987 with Anthony Kosten and Jonny Hector, and in 1991 with Matthew Sadler.

Since 1991, Vaisser has represented France. He won the French championship at Narbonne 1997, and was twice runner-up (1996 and 2001).

Vaisser played twice for France in the Chess Olympiads of:

- 1998, on the fourth board at the 33rd Chess Olympiad in Elista (+2 −1 =4);
- 2002, on the second reserve board at the 35th Chess Olympiad in Bled (+2 −3 =1).

Vaisser has won the World Senior Chess Championship in 2010, 2013, and, since the seniors' championships has been split into two divisions, also in 2014 and 2016 in the 65+ age category.

== Notable games ==
- Anthony Miles vs Anatoli Vaisser, ol (men) 1998, Horwitz Defense: General (A80), 1/2-1/2
- Anatoli Vaisser vs A Mutzner, Mendrisio open 1988, Dutch Defense: Raphael Variation (A80), 1–0

== See also ==
- List of Jewish chess players
