= World Senior Chess Championship =

Annual chess tournament

The World Senior Chess Championship is an annual chess tournament established in 1991 by FIDE, the World Chess Federation.

The 2026 tournament took place in Vrnjačka Banja, Serbia, from 3 to 14 November.

== Overview ==
Originally, the minimum age was 60 years for men, and 50 for women.

Since 2014, the Senior Championship is split in two different age categories, 50+ and 65+, with separate open and women-only tournaments. Participants must reach the age of 50 or 65 years by December 31 of the year of the event. There is a category for players 75+ which provides special prizes.

The championship is organized as an eleven-round Swiss system tournament. It is an open tournament, and each FIDE member federation may send as many players as desired. The separate women's tournament is held only if there are enough participants (at least 10 women from four different FIDE zones).

The winner of the open 50+ tournament is awarded the title of Grandmaster if he/she does not already have it, and the winners of the women's tournaments (both age categories) are awarded the title of Woman Grandmaster if they do not already have it.

So far one World Chess Champion, Vasily Smyslov, has gone on to win the World Senior Championship as well, winning the first such championship aged 70 in 1991. Nona Gaprindashvili is the only Women's World Chess Champion to obtain the women's World Senior title as well.

The oldest World Senior Champion, male or female – before the split in two different age categories was made – was Viktor Korchnoi, who won the title at the age of 75 and a half (in 2006, his only participation).

Vlastimil Jansa then won the 65+ section at the age of 76 in 2018 (his first gold medal), Gaprindashvili won the same year in the women's group 65+ at the age of 77. Julio Ernesto Granda Zuniga of Peru (born in 1967) is the youngest Senior World Chess Champion, section 50+, at the age of 50 in 2017.

For comparison, the oldest reigning World Chess Champion ever was Wilhelm Steinitz, who held the title until the age of 58 years, 10 days. The oldest reigning classical World Chess Champion since the inception of the World Senior Chess championship in 1991 was Viswanathan Anand, who held the title until age 43 when he lost to Magnus Carlsen.

== History ==
The 8th World Senior Championship was held 9–23 November 1998 in Grieskirchen, Austria. Vladimir Bagirov (Latvia) won the 200-player open section on tie-break over Wolfgang Uhlmann (Germany), both with 8.5/11. Ten players tied a half point behind with 8.0/11, including former World Championship Candidates Mark Taimanov and Borislav Ivkov, the first ever World Junior Chess Champion. WGM Tamar Khmiadashvili (Georgia) won the 24-player women's section outright with 9.5 points.

The 13th World Senior Championship was held 16–29 November 2003 in Bad Zwischenahn, Germany. IM Yuri Shabanov (Russia) won the 272-player open section 9.0/11 on tie-break over GM Jānis Klovāns (Latvia) and IM Vladimir Bukal (Croatia), and was therefore awarded the Grandmaster title. Khmiadashvili (Georgia) won the 22-player women's section 7.5/9 on tie-break over WGM Marta Litinskaya-Shul (Ukraine).

The 14th World Senior Championship was held 24 October–5 November 2004 in Halle (Saale), Germany. GM Yuri Shabanov (Russia) defended his championship, winning the 215-player open section on a tie-break with five players scoring 8.5/11. GM Elena Fatalibekova (Russia) won the 19-player women's section outright with 8.0/9.

The 16th World Senior Chess Championship was held 11–23 September 2006 in Arvier, Italy. Former World Chess Championship challenger and top seed GM Viktor Korchnoi (Switzerland) won the 126-player open section 9.0/11. Competing in his first and sole Seniors' Championship, Korchnoi won his first four games, drew in the fifth round with Jānis Klovāns, and then won the next three again. Entering the ninth round with a full point lead, Korchnoi drew his final three games to take the € 3000 gold medal. WGM Ludmila Saunina (Russia), won the 14-player women's section by a full point, 8.5/11, to earn € 700.

== Winners ==
#	Year	City	Open Tournament winner	Women's Tournament winner
1	1991	Bad Wörishofen (Germany)	Vasily Smyslov (Russia)	Eva Ladanyine-Karakas (Hungary)
2	1992	Bad Wörishofen (Germany)	Efim Geller (Russia)	Eva Ladanyine-Karakas (Hungary)
3	1993	Bad Wildbad (Germany)	Mark Taimanov (Russia)	Tatiana Zatulovskaya (Russia)
4	1994	Biel/Bienne (Switzerland)	Mark Taimanov (Russia)	Eva Ladanyine-Karakas (Hungary)
5	1995	Bad Liebenzell (Germany)	Evgeny Vasiukov (Russia)	Nona Gaprindashvili (Georgia)
6	1996	Bad Liebenzell (Germany)	Alexey Suetin (Russia)	Valentina Kozlovskaya (Russia)
7	1997	Bad Wildbad (Germany)	Jānis Klovāns (Latvia)	Tatiana Zatulovskaya (Russia)
8	1998	Grieskirchen (Austria)	Vladimir Bagirov (Latvia)	Tamar Khmiadashvili (Georgia)
9	1999	Gladenbach (Germany)	Jānis Klovāns (Latvia)	Tamar Khmiadashvili (Georgia)
10	2000	Rowy (Poland)	Oleg Chernikov (Russia)	Elena Fatalibekova (Russia)
11	2001	Arco (Italy)	Jānis Klovāns (Latvia)	Elena Fatalibekova (Russia)
12	2002	Naumburg (Germany)	Juzefs Petkēvičs (Latvia)	Marta Litinskaya (Ukraine)
13	2003	Bad Zwischenahn (Germany)	Yuri Shabanov (Russia)	Tamar Khmiadashvili (Georgia)
14	2004	Halle, Saxony-Anhalt (Germany)	Yuri Shabanov (Russia)	Elena Fatalibekova (Russia)
15	2005	Lignano Sabbiadoro (Italy)	Liuben Spassov (Bulgaria)	Ludmila Saunina (Russia)
16	2006	Arvier (Italy)	Viktor Korchnoi (Switzerland)	Ludmila Saunina (Russia)
17	2007	Gmunden (Austria)	Algimantas Butnorius (Lithuania)	Hanna Ereńska-Barlo (Poland)
18	2008	Bad Zwischenahn (Germany)	Larry Kaufman (USA) and Mihai Șubă (Romania)	Tamāra Vilerte (Latvia)
19	2009	Condino (Italy)	Mišo Cebalo (Croatia)	Nona Gaprindashvili (Georgia)
20	2010	Arco (Italy)	Anatoly Vaisser (France)	Tamar Khmiadashvili (Georgia)
21	2011	Opatija (Croatia)	Vladimir Okhotnik (France)	Galina Strutinskaya (Russia)
22	2012	Kamena Vourla (Greece)	Jens Kristiansen (Denmark)	Galina Strutinskaya (Russia)
23	2013	Opatija (Croatia)	Anatoly Vaisser (France)	Yelena Ankudinova (Kazakhstan)
24	2014	Katerini (Greece)	Anatoly Vaisser (France) (65+); Zurab Sturua (Georgia) (50+)	Nona Gaprindashvili (Georgia) (65+); Svetlana Mednikova (Russia) (50+)
25	2015	Acqui Terme (Italy)	Vladimir Okhotnik (France) (65+); Predrag Nikolic (Bosnia and Herzegovina) (50+)	Nona Gaprindashvili (Georgia) (65+); Galina Strutinskaya (Russia) (50+)
26	2016	Mariánské Lázně (Czech Republic)	Anatoly Vaisser (France) (65+); Giorgi Bagaturov (Georgia) (50+)	Nona Gaprindashvili (Georgia) (65+); Tatiana Bogumil (Russia) (50+)
27	2017	Acqui Terme (Italy)	Evgeny Sveshnikov (Russia) (65+); Julio Granda (Peru) (50+)	Tamar Khmiadashvili (Georgia) (65+); Elvira Berend (Luxembourg) (50+)
28	2018	Bled (Slovenia)	Vlastimil Jansa (Czech Republic) (65+); Karen Movsziszian (Armenia) (50+)	Nona Gaprindashvili (Georgia) (65+); Elvira Berend (Luxembourg) (50+)
29	2019	Bucharest (Romania)	Rafael Vaganian (Armenia) (65+); Vadim Shishkin (Ukraine) (50+)	Nona Gaprindashvili (Georgia) (65+); Elvira Berend (Luxembourg) (50+)
30	2022	Assisi (Italy)	John Nunn (England) (65+); Zurab Sturua (Georgia) (50+)	Nona Gaprindashvili (Georgia) (65+); Elvira Berend (Luxembourg) (50+)
31	2023	Terrasini (Italy)	John Nunn (England) (65+); Michael Adams (England) (50+)	Galina Strutinskaya (Russia) (65+); Monica Calzetta Ruiz (Spain) (50+)
32	2024	Porto Santo (Portugal)	Rainer Knaak (Germany) (65+); Alexander Shabalov (United States) (50+)	Brigitte Burchardt (Germany) (65+); Masha Klinova (Israel) (50+)
33	2025	Gallipoli (Italy)	Alexander Reprintsev (Ukraine) (65+); Victor Mikhalevski (Israel) (50+)	Galina Strutinskaya (Russia) (65+); Ketevan Arakhamia-Grant (Scotland) (50+)
34	2026	Vrnjačka Banja (Serbia)	Zurab Sturua (Georgia) (65+); Murtas Kazhgaleyev (Kazakhstan) (50+)	Galina Strutinskaya (Russia) (65+); Pia Cramling (Sweden) (50+)

== See also ==
- European Senior Chess Championship
- Asian Senior Chess Championship

== General references ==
- FIDE, "D.VIII.01. World Senior (Women) Championship", FIDE Handbook, archived from the original on 2007-06-08
- Crowther, Mark (23 November 1998), THE WEEK IN CHESS 211: 8th World Senior Championships, London Chess Center
- FIDE, World Senior Championship 2003
- FIDE, World Senior Championship 2004
- 15th World Senior Chess Championship, Chess-Results.com
