= Zurab Sturua =

Georgian chess grandmaster (born 1959)

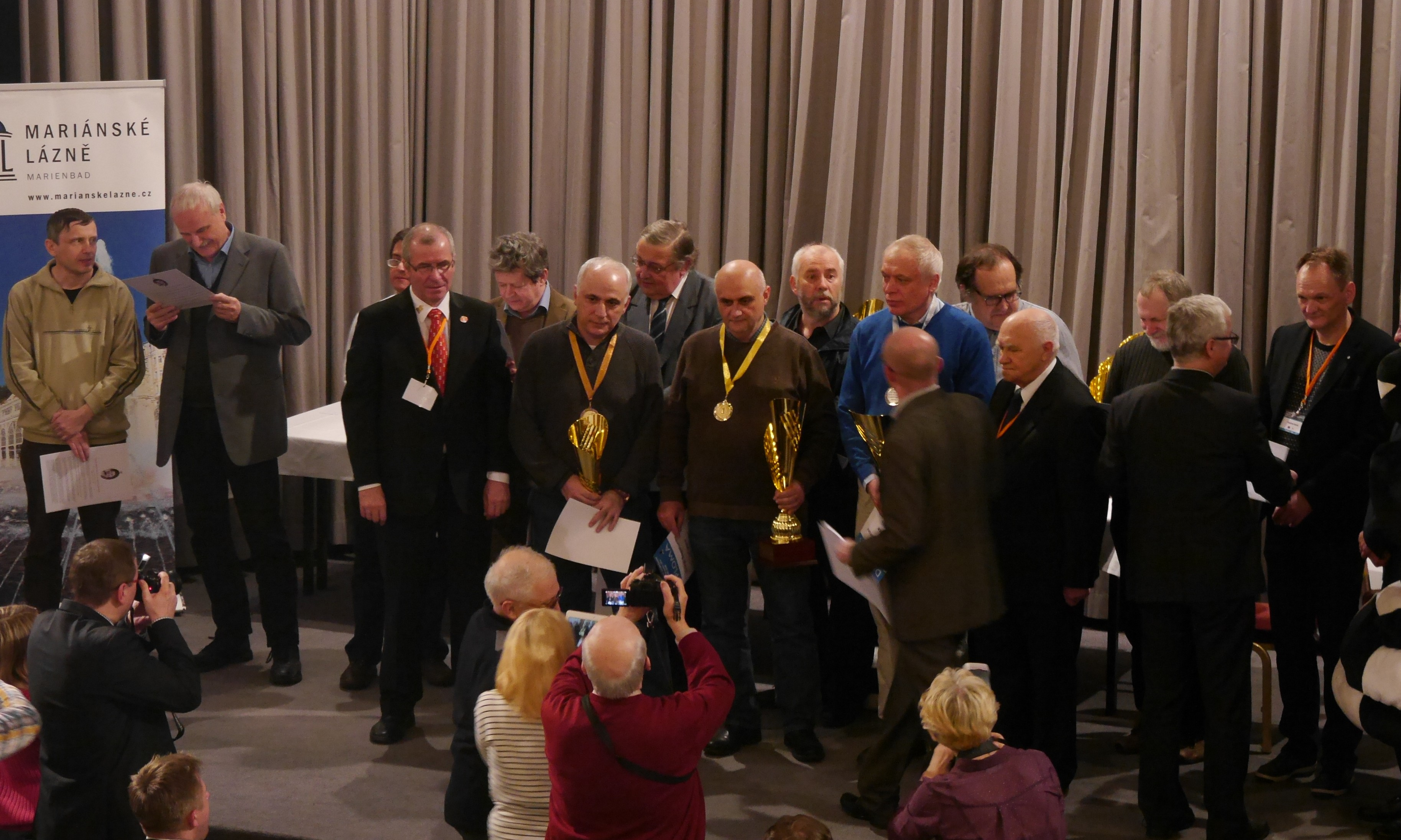

Personal information
- Born: 8 June 1959 (age 67) Tbilisi, Georgia

Chess career
- Country: Soviet Union → Georgia
- Title: Grandmaster (1991)
- FIDE rating: 2488 (October 2026)
- Peak rating: 2605 (January 1999)
- Peak ranking: No. 73 (January 1999)

Zurab Sturua (Georgian: ზურაბ სტურუა; born 8 June 1959) is a Georgian chess player, who was awarded the title of grandmaster by FIDE in 1991. He won the Georgian Chess Championship in 1975 (at the age of 16), 1977, 1981, 1984 and 1985 and played for Georgia in the Chess Olympiads of 1992, 1994, 1996, 1998, 2000 and 2002.

Sturua won the Master Open of the Biel Chess Festival in 1991 and 1996. He tied for 1st–5th places with Jaan Ehlvest, Christopher Lutz, Gyula Sax and Aleksander Delchev at Pula 1997. In 1998, he tied for 7th–11th with Giorgi Bagaturov, Ioannis Nikolaidis, and Ashot Nadanian in the zonal tournament in Panormo, Crete, which was the qualifying tournament for the FIDE World Chess Championship 1999.

In 2005, Sturua tied for 1st–2nd with Mikheil Kekelidze at the Zayed Open in Dubai, winning the tournament on tiebreak.

Sturua won the over-50 section of the World Seniors' Championship in 2014 and won the same division at the European Seniors' Championship in 2015, 2016, and 2019.
