= Mikheil Kekelidze =

Georgian chess grandmaster (born 1974)

Personal information
- Born: September 14, 1974 (age 51)

Chess career
- Country: Georgia
- Title: Grandmaster (2000)
- Peak rating: 2520 (April 2006)

Mikheil Kekelidze is a Georgian chess grandmaster.

== Chess career ==
In November 2024, he tied with Edwin van Haastert and Martin Mrva in the European Senior Chess Championship, ultimately winning the title by having the best tiebreak criteria.

In December 2024, he led the 5th Elllobregat Open Chess Tournament with a perfect score after four rounds alongside Ido Gorshtein.

In April 2025, he was held to a draw at the Grenke Chess Open A by young American rising star Megan Paragua, who is also the niece of Mark Paragua.
