= Alla Kushnir =

Soviet-Israeli chess player and classicist (1941–2013)

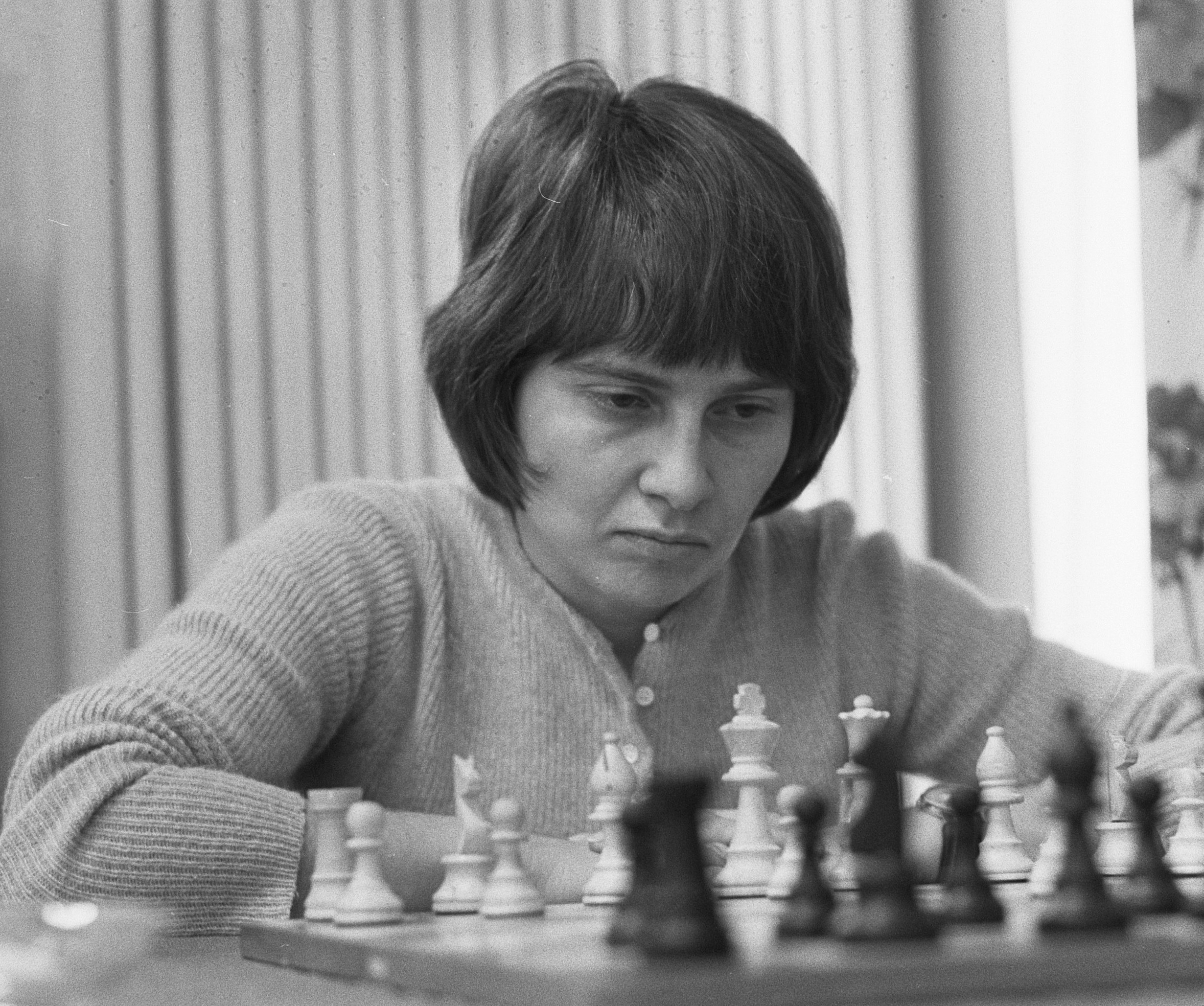
- Kushnir (1973)

Personal information
- Native name: אלה קושניר
- Born: Alla Shulimovna Kushnir; 11 August 1941 Moscow, Russia SSR, Soviet Union
- Died: 2 August 2013 (aged 71) Tel Aviv, Israel

Chess career
- Country: Soviet Union; Israel
- Title: Woman Grandmaster (1976)
- Peak rating: 2430 (January 1990)

Alla Shulimovna Kushnir (later, Kushnir-Stein) (Hebrew: אלה שולימובנה קושניר; Russian: Алла Шулимовна Кушнир; 11 August 1941 – 2 August 2013) was a Soviet-born Israeli chess player and professor of classics, numismatics, and archaeology. She was awarded the FIDE titles of Woman International Master (WIM) in 1962 and Woman Grandmaster (WGM) in 1976. In 2017, she was inducted into the World Chess Hall of Fame.

== Biography ==
Alla Kushnir immigrated from the Soviet Union to Israel in 1974. She married a Bank Leumi executive Marcel Stein in 1978.

== Chess career ==
Kushnir was thrice Women's World Chess Championship Challenger consecutively. She lost matches for the title to Nona Gaprindashvili:

- +3 –7 =3 at Riga 1965;
- +2 –6 =5 at Tbilisi–Moscow 1969;
- +4 –5 =7 at Riga 1972.

In tournaments, she took 1st-3rd at Sukhumi Candidates Tournament (joint Milunka Lazarević and Tatiana Zatulovskaya) 1964, won at Beberjik 1967, won at Subotica (Candidates Tournament) 1967, 2nd at Belgrad 1968, tied for 1st-2nd (with Nikolau) at Sinaia 1969, tied for 2nd-3rd (with Vobralova, won by Ivánka) at Wijk aan Zee 1971, won at Belgrad 1971 (ahead Gaprindashvili), won at Moscow 1971, won at Vrnjačka Banja 1973, 3rd at Voronezh 1973 (behind Zatulovskaya and Saunina), won at Roosendaal Interzonal 1976 (joint Akhmilovskaya).

Kushnir was a three-time winner of the Women's Chess Olympiad: in 1969 and 1972 she won the tournament as a player in the Soviet team, both times showing the best result at the 2nd board, and in 1976 she won it as a player in the Israeli team, showing the best result at the 1st board.

She ended 5th USSR Women's Champion in Lipetsk (1959), 3rd-4th with Volpert USSR Women's Champion in Baku (1961), 2nd-3rd with Volpert USSR Women's Champion in Riga (1962), 3rd-4th with Koslovskaya USSR Women's Champion in Baku (1963) (then in the match playoff Kushnir beat Koslovskaya: 4–2), tied 1st place with Ranniku USSR Women's Champion in Beltsy (1970). Kushnir in the match playoff to beat 4 1/2-3 1/2 Ranniku at Moscow (February 1971).

One of her common opponents, Nona Gaprindashvili, described Kushnir as being an especially difficult opponent.

== Academic career ==
Alla Kushnir-Stein was a faculty member of the Department of Classics at Tel Aviv University and was Israel's scientific advisor to the Numismatic Society. She became an editor of Israel Numismatic Research. In 2013, she became the first Israeli and first woman to receive the Israel Museum’s Ya'akov Meshorer Numismatic Prize. She was a main contributor to the Corpus Inscriptionum Iudaeae/Palaestinae.

== Death ==
She died in 2013 in Tel Aviv, nine days before her 72nd birthday, after a short illness.

== See also ==
- Sports in Israel
- List of Jewish chess players
