= Yelena Ankudinova =

Kazakhstani chess player (born 1962)

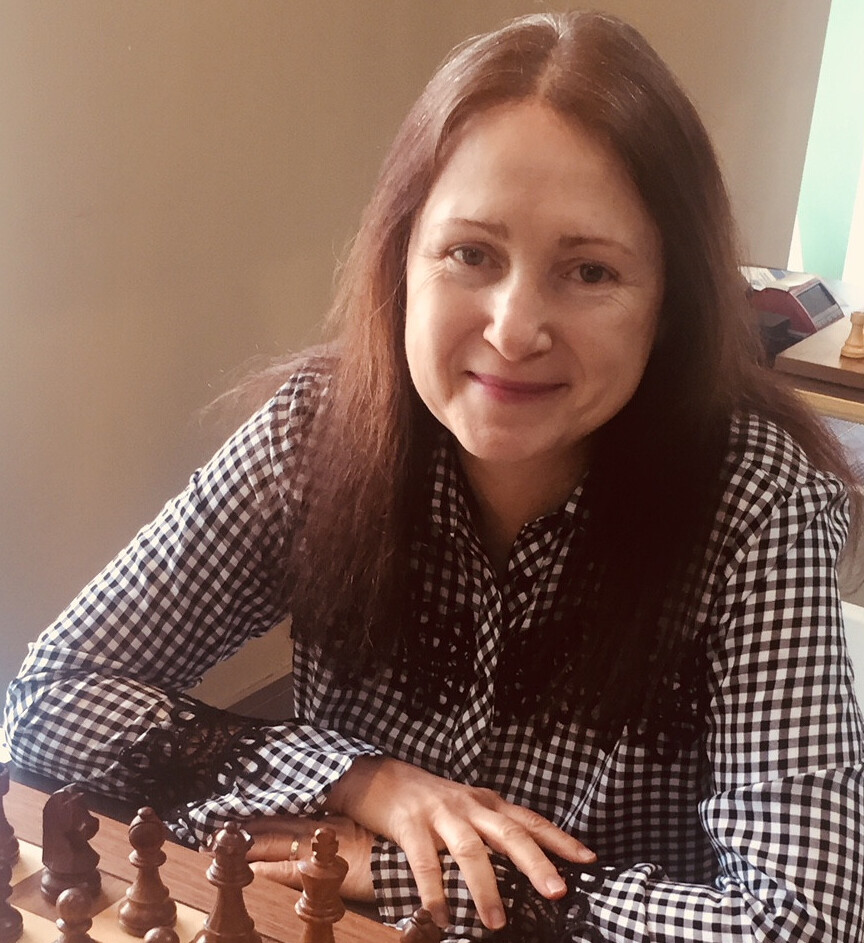
- Ankudinova in 2018

Personal information
- Born: 14 November 1962 (age 63) Pavlodar, Kazakh SSR, Soviet Union

Chess career
- Country: Soviet Union (until 1991); Kazakhstan (since 1991)
- Title: Woman Grandmaster (2013)
- Peak rating: 2268 (July 2007)

Yelena Anatolyevna Ankudinova (Russian: Елена Анатольевна Анкудинова; born 14 November 1962) is a Kazakh chess player.

== Chess career ==
In November 2013, she won the World Senior Women's Chess Championship, which had a field including 5 Grandmasters and 5 International Masters.

In November 2014, she finished in second place at the World Senior Women's Chess Championship.

In September 2019, she won the 50+ section of all three categorites (standard, rapid, and blitz) of the Asian Senior Women's Chess Championship.
