= Valentina Kozlovskaya =

Russian chess player (1938–2025)

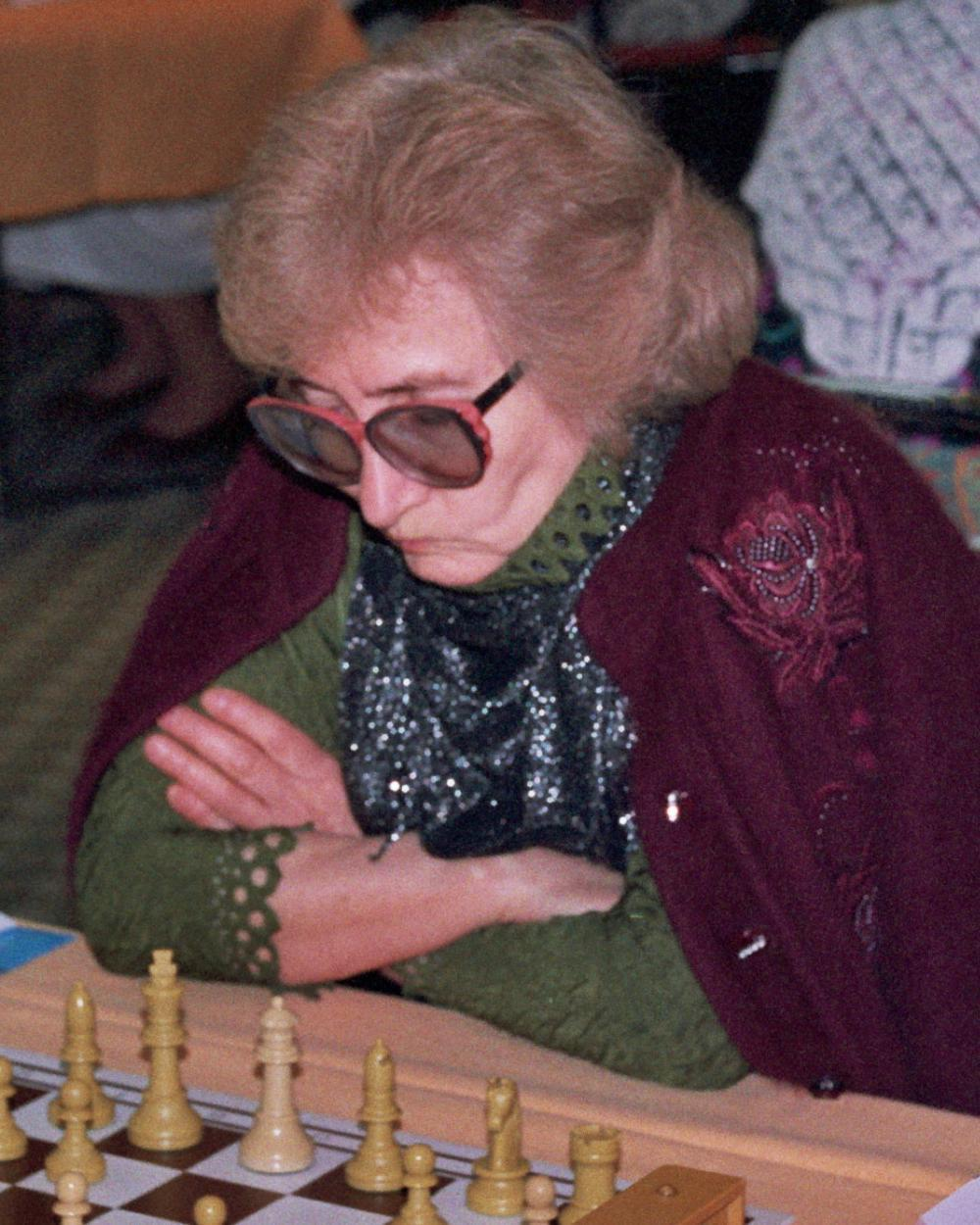
- Kozlovskaya at the World Seniors' Championships 1996

Personal information
- Born: Valentina Yakovlevna Kozlovskaya; 18 April 1938 Yessentuki, Ordzhonikidze Krai, Russian SFSR, Soviet Union
- Died: 22 December 2025 (aged 87)
- Spouse: Igor Bondarevsky

Chess career
- Country: Soviet Union → Russia
- Title: Woman Grandmaster (1976)
- Peak rating: 2315 (January 1975)

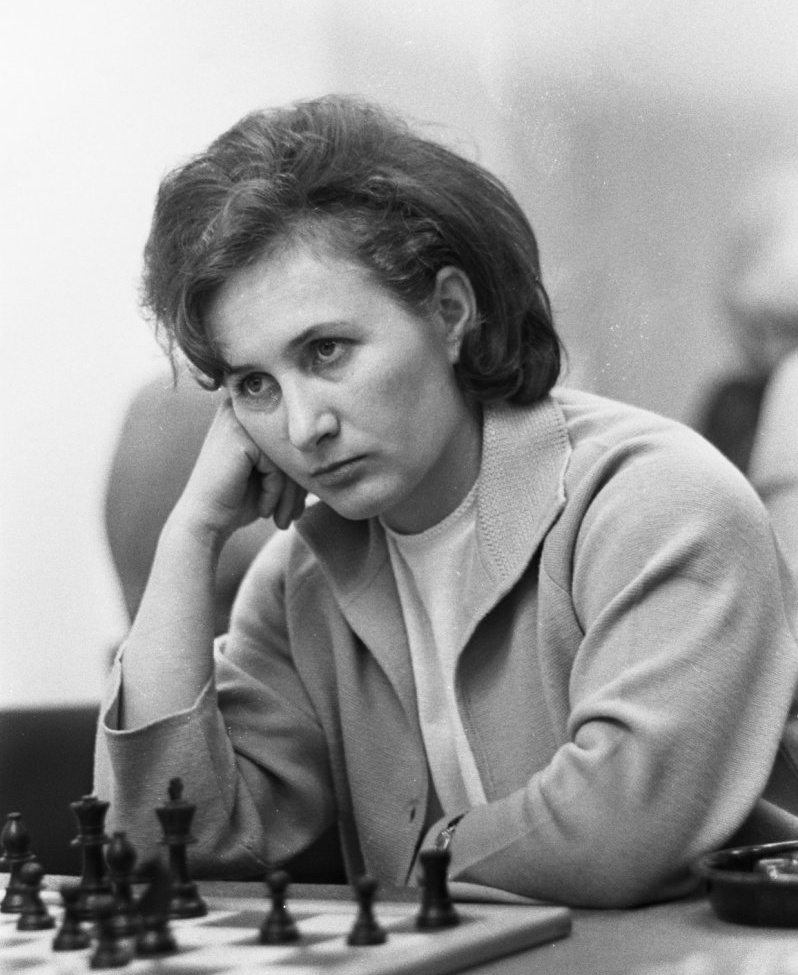
Kozlovskaya in 1968

Valentina Yakovlevna Kozlovskaya (Russian: Валенти́на Я́ковлевна Козло́вская; 18 April 1938 – 22 December 2025) was a Russian chess player. She was awarded the title of Woman Grandmaster (WGM) by FIDE in 1976.

== Chess career ==
Kozlovskaya won the Women's Soviet Chess Championship in 1965. She was a member of the victorious Soviet team at the Women's Chess Olympiad in Havana 1966. She came second in the 1967 Women's Candidates Tournament. In the same year she placed second to women's world champion Nona Gaprindashvili in a women's international tournament at Kiev. In 1973 Kozlovskaya won the Women's Interzonal tournament and the next year, she lost the Candidates semifinal match to Irina Levitina. In 1976 Kozlovskaya won the RSFSR women's championship and in 1979, she shared first place with Ludmila Saunina. Kozlovskaya won the Women's World Senior Championship in 1996. In 2014, she won the European Senior Championship in the women's 65+ division, ahead of Nona Gaprindashvili.

== Personal life and death ==
Kozlovskaya was a biochemist by profession. She was married to Grandmaster Igor Bondarevsky. Kozlovskaya died on 22 December 2025, at the age of 87.
