= Galina Strutinskaya =

Russian chess player (born 1957)

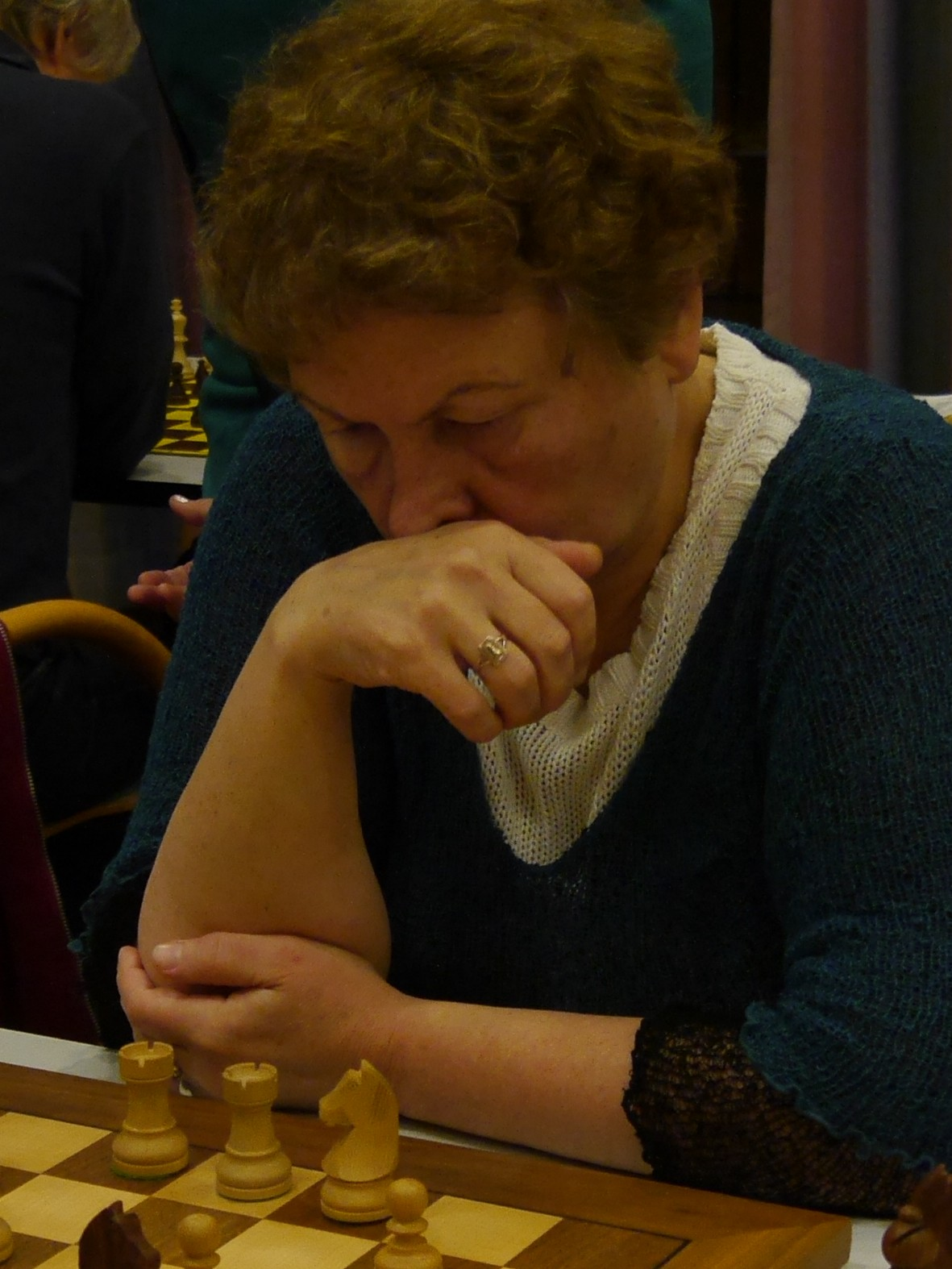
- Galina Strutinskaya in 2016

Personal information
- Born: Galina Nikolayevna Strutinskaya; 1 July 1957 (age 69) Konotop, Ukrainian SSR, Soviet Union

Chess career
- Country: Soviet Union → Russia
- Title: Woman Grandmaster (2011)
- Peak rating: 2361 (July 2001)

Galina Nikolayevna Strutinskaya (Russian: Галина Николаевна Струтинская; born 1 July 1957) is a Russian chess player, trainer and international arbiter. She won the Women's World Senior Chess Championship in 2011, 2012 and 2015 (the latter in the category 50+). The 2011 victory automatically earned her the title of Woman Grandmaster (WGM). Strutinskaya also won the Women's European Senior Chess Championship in the 50+ category in 2016 and 2017.

Strutinskaya played for Russia's second team in the Women's Chess Olympiad in 1994.
