= Marta Litinskaya-Shul =

Ukrainian chess player

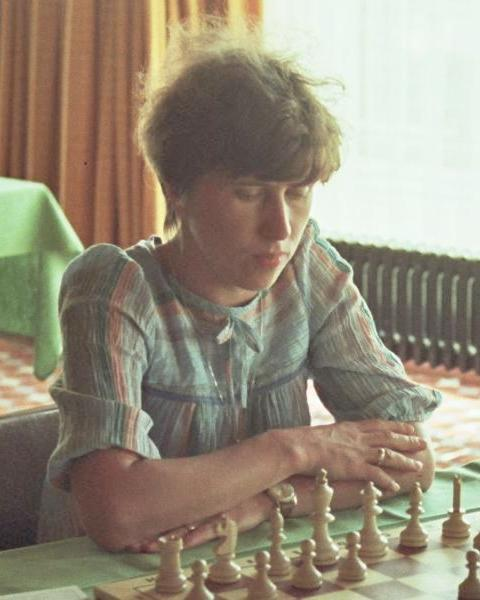
- Marta Litynska at the 1982 Interzonal Tournament in Bad Kissingen

Personal information
- Born: 25 March 1949 (age 77) Lviv, Ukrainian SSR, Soviet Union

Chess career
- Country: Soviet Union → Ukraine
- Title: Woman Grandmaster (1976)
- FIDE rating: 2326 (January 2005)
- Peak rating: 2415 (January 1987)

Marta Ivanivna Litynska (Ukrainian: Марта Іванівна Літинська; Russian: Марта Ивановна Литинская, Marta Ivanovna Litinskaya; born 25 March 1949 in Lviv) is a Ukrainian chess player holding the title of Woman Grandmaster (WGM).

== Biography ==
Born Marta Shul, she was Soviet Women's Champion in 1972, and runner-up in 1971, 1973, and 1974. She also won the Ukrainian Women's Championship in 1967, 1977 and 1995. She played in the 2nd Interzonal Tournament in Menorca 1973 where tied for 2nd–5th places. In 1974, she lost a semifinal match to Nana Alexandria in Riga.

Litinskaya won the Women's World Senior Championship in Naumburg 2002.

She was awarded the FIDE titles of Woman International Master (WIM) in 1972 and Woman Grandmaster in 1976. She received the Lady International Correspondence Chess Master title in 1978.
