= Brigitte Burchardt =

German chess player (born 1954)

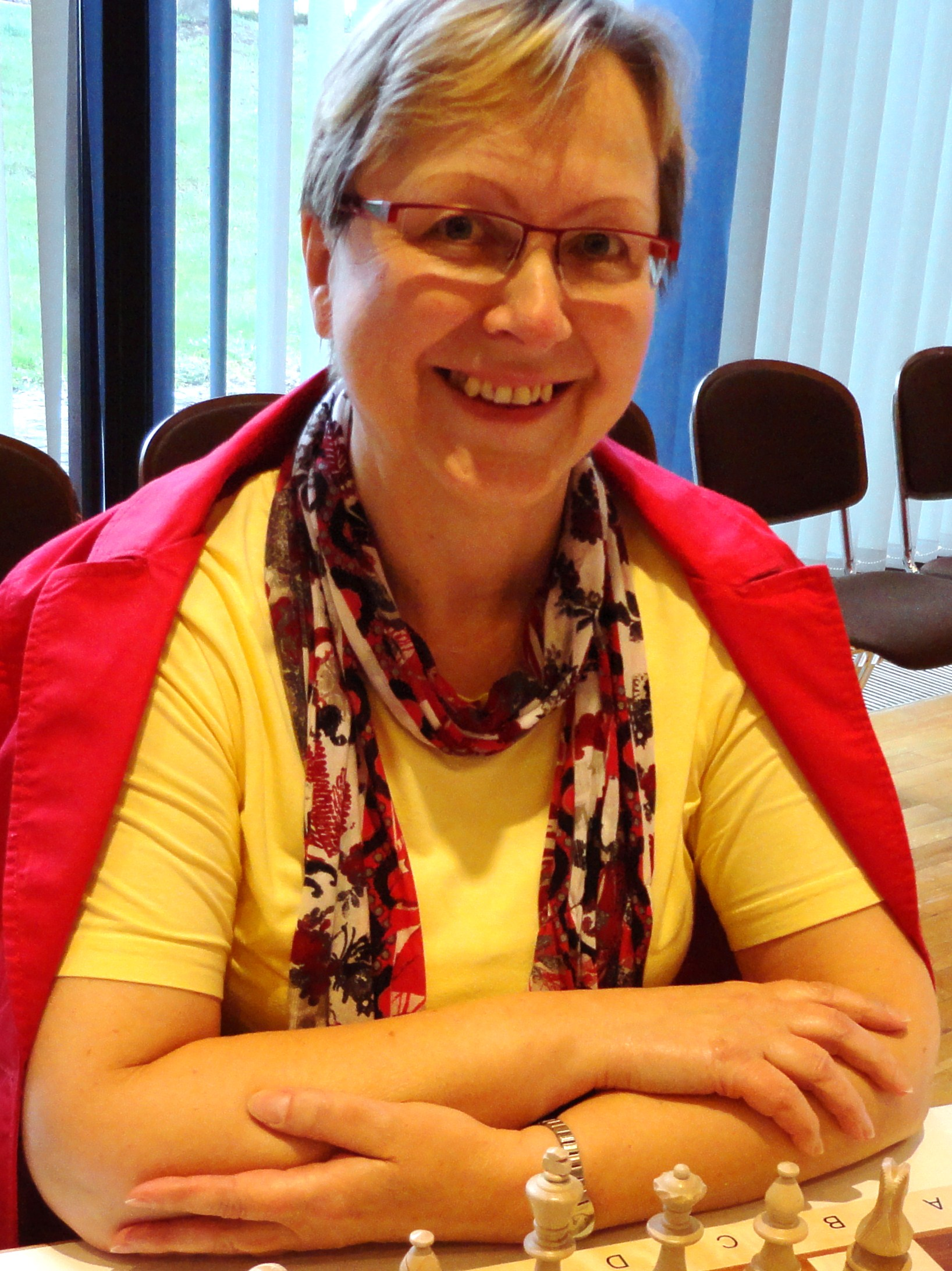
- Burchardt in 2012

Personal information
- Full name: Brigitte Burchardt-Hofmann
- Born: 17 October 1954 (age 71) Weißenfels, Germany

Chess career
- Country: East Germany; Germany
- Title: Woman Grandmaster (2024)
- Peak rating: 2295 (January 1987)

Brigitte Burchardt (born 17 October 1954), née Hofmann, also Burchardt-Hofmann, is a German chess player who holds the FIDE title of Woman Grandmaster. She was a three-time winner the East Germany Women's Chess Championship (1975, 1978, 1979).

== Biography ==
In the 1970s and 1980s, Brigitte Burchardt was one of the leading chess players in East Germany. Many times she participated in the finals of East Germany Women's Chess Championships, where winning 10 medals: 3 gold (1975, 1978, 1979), 5 silver (1972, 1976, 1980, 1982, 1990) and 2 bronze (1970, 1983). She was also a three-time East Germany Women's champion in fast chess (1970, 1979, 1981).

In 1974, she won the international women's chess tournament in Piotrków Trybunalski. In 1975, she was awarded the FIDE Woman International Master (WIM) title. In 1976, she participated at Women's World Chess Championship Interzonal Tournament in Tbilisi and ranked 9th place. In 1980, she shared 1st-2nd place together with Grażyna Szmacińska in the international women's chess tournament in Bydgoszcz, and in 1990 she achieved another success, winning in the international women's chess tournament in Aarhus. Many times she has been successful in international tournaments played in Halle, including shared 1st place in 1975, 2nd place in 1976, 1st place in 1978, shared 1st place in 1979, 1st place in 1982 and shared 2nd place in 1987.

Brigitte Burchardt played for East Germany (1990) and Germany (1992) in the Women's Chess Olympiads:

- In 1990, at first board in the 29th Chess Olympiad (women) in Novi Sad (+7, =1, -4),
- In 1992, at second board in the 30th Chess Olympiad (women) in Manila (+3, =2, -5).

Her daughter Regina Burchardt (born 1983) is former volleyball player.
