= Oleg Chernikov =

Russian chess grandmaster (1936–2015)

Personal information
- Born: October 15, 1936 Gorky, Soviet Union
- Died: February 6, 2015 (aged 78) Nizhny Novgorod, Russia

Chess career
- Country: Soviet Union (until 1991); Russia (after 1991)
- Title: Grandmaster (2000)
- Peak rating: 2472 (July 2001)

Oleg Leonidovich Chernikov (Russian: Олег Леонидович Черников, 15 October 1936, Gorky – 6 February 2015, Nizhny Novgorod) was a Russian chess grandmaster.

== Biography ==
On 23 September 2000, Chernikov won the World Senior Chess Championship and earned the Grandmaster title for his win.

In March 2006, he played for the winning Moscow team in the European Senior Team Chess Championship.

He died on 6 February, 2015. A memorial tournament was held in his memory in Nizhny Novgorod in October 2015.
