= Rowy, Pomeranian Voivodeship =

Rowy
- Village
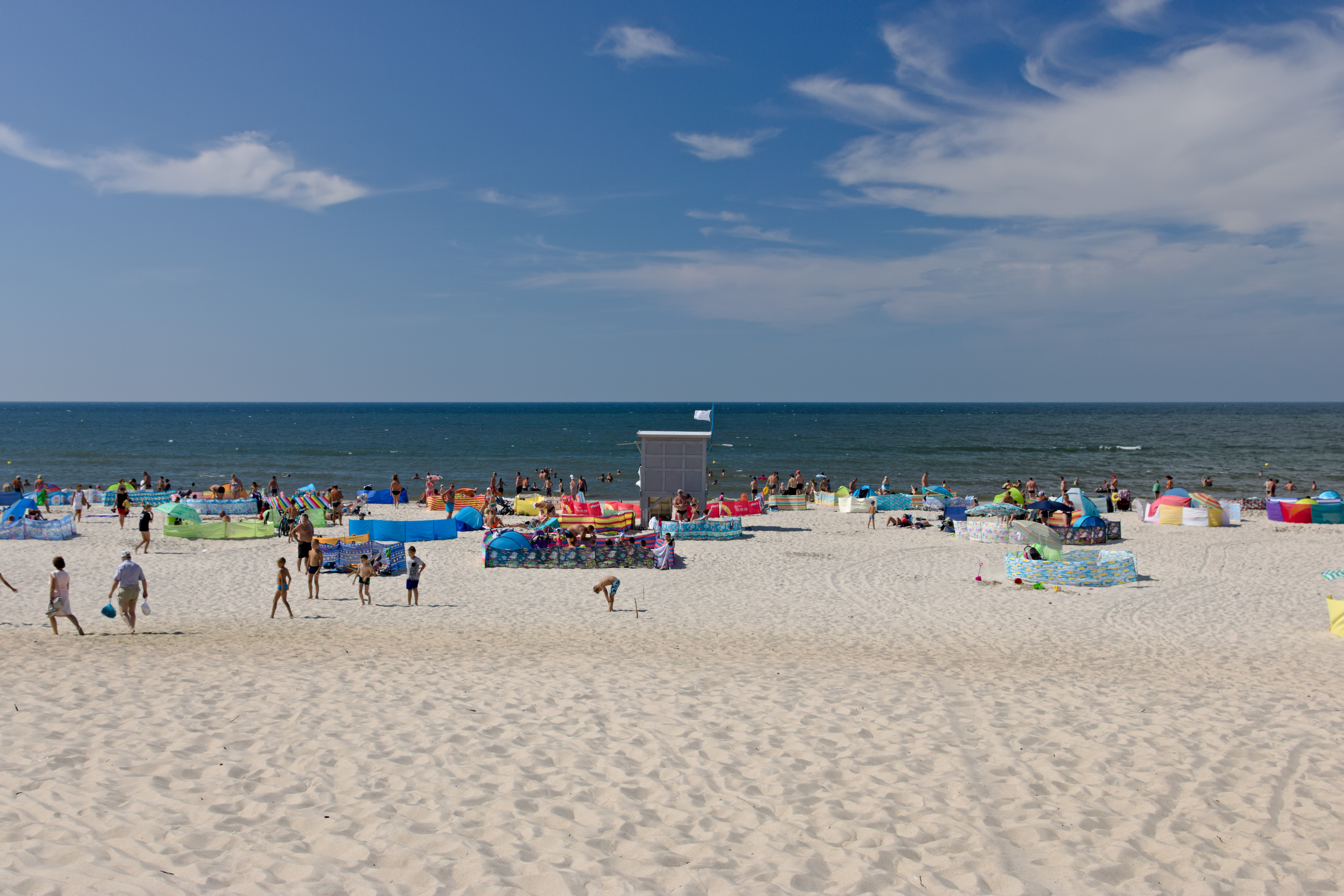
- Rowy beach

- Location within Poland
- Coordinates: 54°40′0″N 17°3′9″E
- Country: Poland
- Voivodeship: Pomeranian
- County: Słupsk
- Gmina: Ustka
- Population: 310

Rowy [ˈrɔvɨ] (German: Rowe) is a village and seaside resort in the administrative district of Gmina Ustka, within Słupsk County, Pomeranian Voivodeship, in northwestern Poland.
