= Ludmila Saunina =

Russian chess player

Personal information
- Born: July 9, 1952 (age 74) Yekaterinburg, Soviet Union

Chess career
- Country: Russia
- Title: Woman Grandmaster (2005)
- Peak rating: 2319 (April 2001)

Ludmila Feodorovna Saunina (born 1952 in Yekaterinburg) is a Russian chess player, and a woman grandmaster.

She has won several women's chess championships: the Russian Chess Championship in 1972, the Moldovan Chess Championship in 1976, the World Senior Chess Championship and the European Senior Chess Championship.
