= Tatiana Zatulovskaya =

Russian-Israeli chess player (1935–2017)

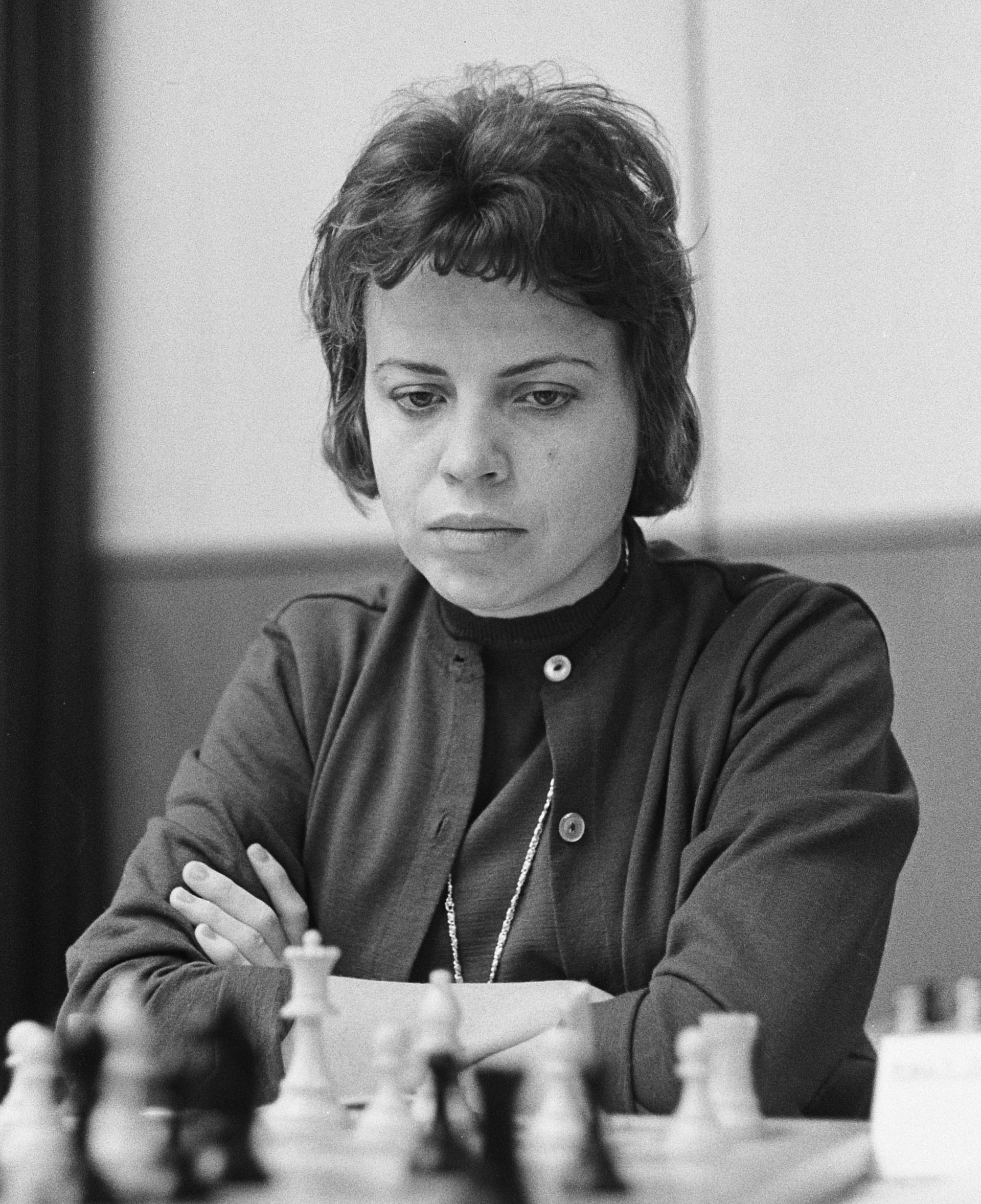
- Zatulovskaya in 1964

Personal information
- Native name: טטיאנה זטולובסקיה
- Born: Tatiana Yakovlevna Zatulovskaya; 8 December 1935 Baku, Azerbaijan Soviet Socialist Republic, USSR
- Died: 2 July 2017 (aged 81)

Chess career
- Country: Soviet Union/Russia; Israel
- Title: Woman Grandmaster (1976)
- Peak rating: 2270 (July 1972)
- Peak ranking: No. 11 woman (July 1972)

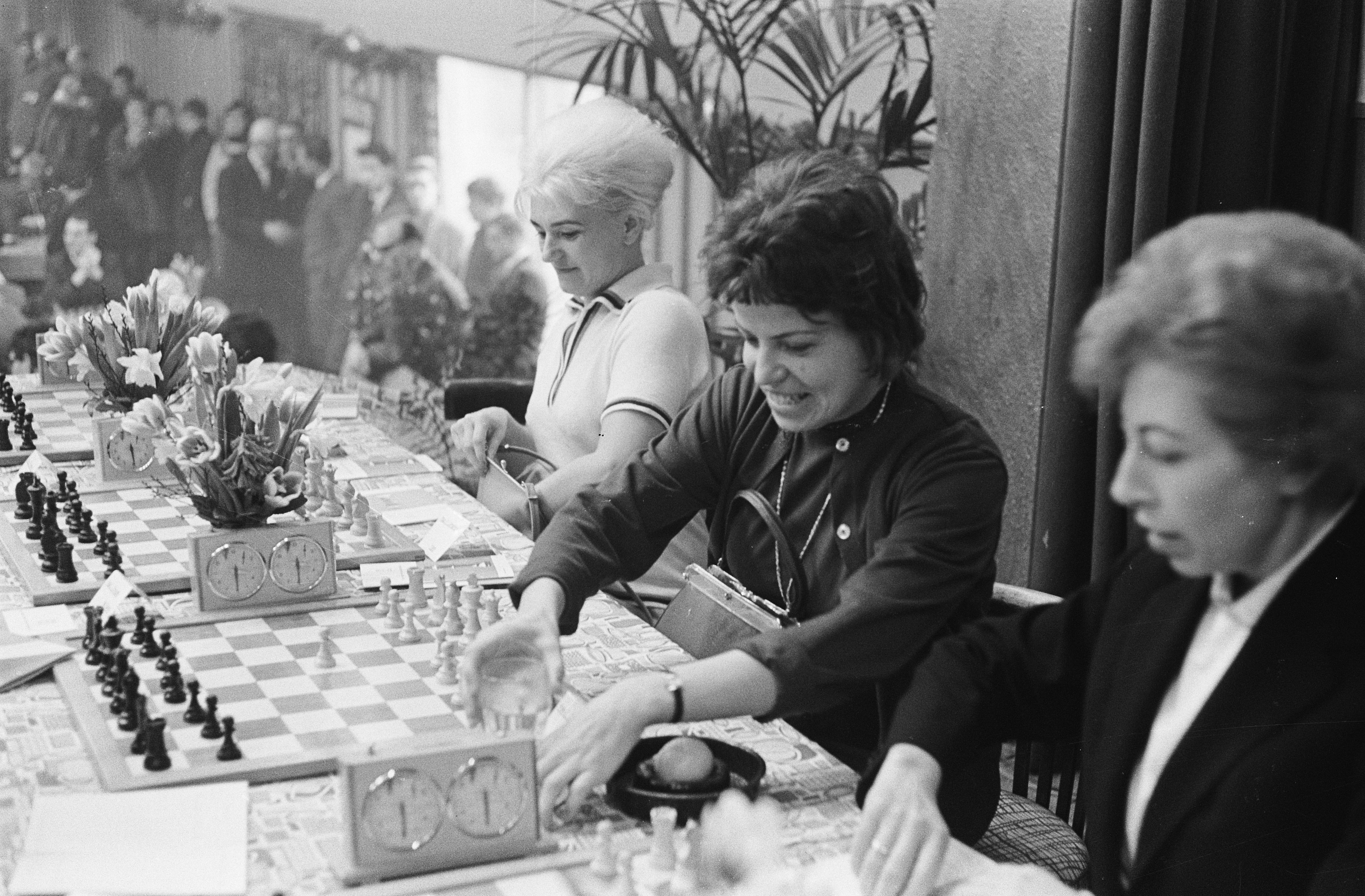
Tatiana Zatulovskaya on 16 January 1964

Tatiana Zatulovskaya (Hebrew: טטיאנה זטולובסקיה; Russian: Татьяна Яковлевна Затуловская, Tatiana Yakovlevna Zatulovskaya; 8 December 1935 – 2 July 2017) was an Israeli (formerly Soviet and Russian) chess player. She was a three-time Soviet women's champion and twice the world women's senior champion. She was awarded the titles Woman International Master (WIM) in 1961 and Woman Grandmaster (WGM) in 1976 by FIDE. Her last name may also be spelled as Zatulovskaia or Zatulovskaja.

Zatulovskaya won the Women's Soviet Chess Championship in 1960, 1962, and 1963. She represented the USSR at the Women's Chess Olympiad in 1963 and 1966, winning the team gold medal on both occasions. She won an individual silver medal in 1963 and an individual gold in 1966. In the 1960s and the 1970s, she often qualified for Interzonals and Candidates Tournaments for the Women's World Chess Championship.

In 1993, she won the Women's Seniors World Championship with a score of 10 out of 11 points (10 wins, 0 losses, and 2 draws). She repeated this success in 1997. In 2000, she emigrated to Israel, which she represented at the 2002 Women's Chess Olympiad. Zatulovskaya died on 2 July 2017 at age 81. In her lifetime, she was also a geological engineer and a good gymnast.

== See also ==
- List of Jewish chess players
