= Nona Gaprindashvili =

Georgian chess grandmaster (born 1941)

Nona Gaprindashvili ნონა გაფრინდაშვილი
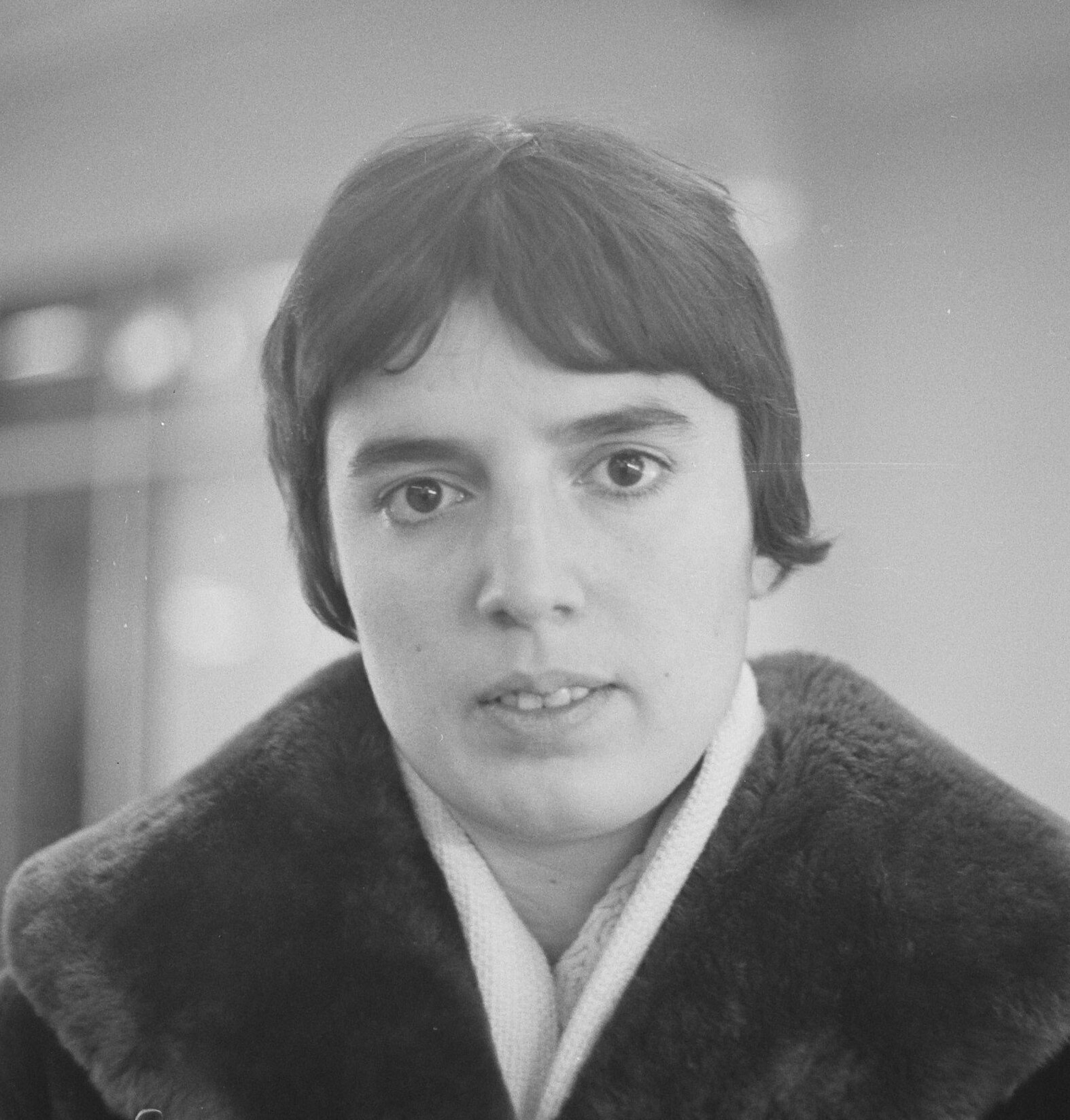
- Gaprindashvili in 1963

Personal information
- Born: 3 May 1941 (age 85) Zugdidi, Georgian SSR, Soviet Union

Chess career
- Country: Soviet Union → Georgia
- Title: Grandmaster (1978)
- Women's World Champion: 1962–1978
- Peak rating: 2495 (July 1987)

Nona Gaprindashvili (Georgian: ნონა გაფრინდაშვილი; born 3 May 1941) is a Georgian chess Grandmaster. Noted for her aggressive style of play, she was the women's world chess champion from 1962 to 1978, and in 1978 was the first woman ever to be awarded the FIDE title of Grandmaster. She was inducted into the World Chess Hall of Fame in 2013 and the Presidential Order of Excellence in 2015.

Gaprindashvili began playing chess when she was five years old; in 1954, she moved to Tbilisi to train under Grandmasters. In 1962, she became women's world chess champion by a sweeping victory in a match against the incumbent, Elisaveta Bykova. This won her widespread acclaim throughout Georgia. She successfully defended her title on four occasions: three times against Alla Kushnir and once against Nana Alexandria. She narrowly lost her title to Maia Chiburdanidze in 1978. Gaprindashvili participated in men's tournaments during her career, including a performance at Lone Pine International which earned her a norm for the title of Grandmaster, the first woman to do so. She later competed regularly in the Women's World Senior Championship.

Besides her chess career, Gaprindashvili maintained an active presence in Georgian politics: she served as a member of the Supreme Soviet of the Georgian SSR, as president of the Georgian National Olympic Committee, and as a member of the People's Assembly group that organized the 2011 Georgian protests. In 2021, Gaprindashvili filed a defamation lawsuit against Netflix after it erroneously described her in The Queen's Gambit as never having competed against men; Netflix settled in 2022.

== Early life ==
Nona Gaprindashvili was born in Zugdidi in 1941, the youngest of six children and the only girl. Her family was highly athletic, and the neighborhood children would often gather at the Gaprindashvili's home to play table tennis, billiards, and football. They had her play goalkeeper during their football games because she was the girl of the family. She first learned to play chess from her father while she was five years old and from watching her brother play. When Gaprindashvili was eleven or twelve, she accompanied her brother to a chess tournament, and when he was unable to play, she played in his stead. Here she was noticed by chess trainer Vakhtang Karseladzé. Her parents had her live with her aunt in Tbilisi, where she could train with chess Grandmasters beginning in 1954. By 1956, at the age of fourteen, she won the semi-final of the Women's Soviet Union Championship.

== World champion and Grandmaster ==
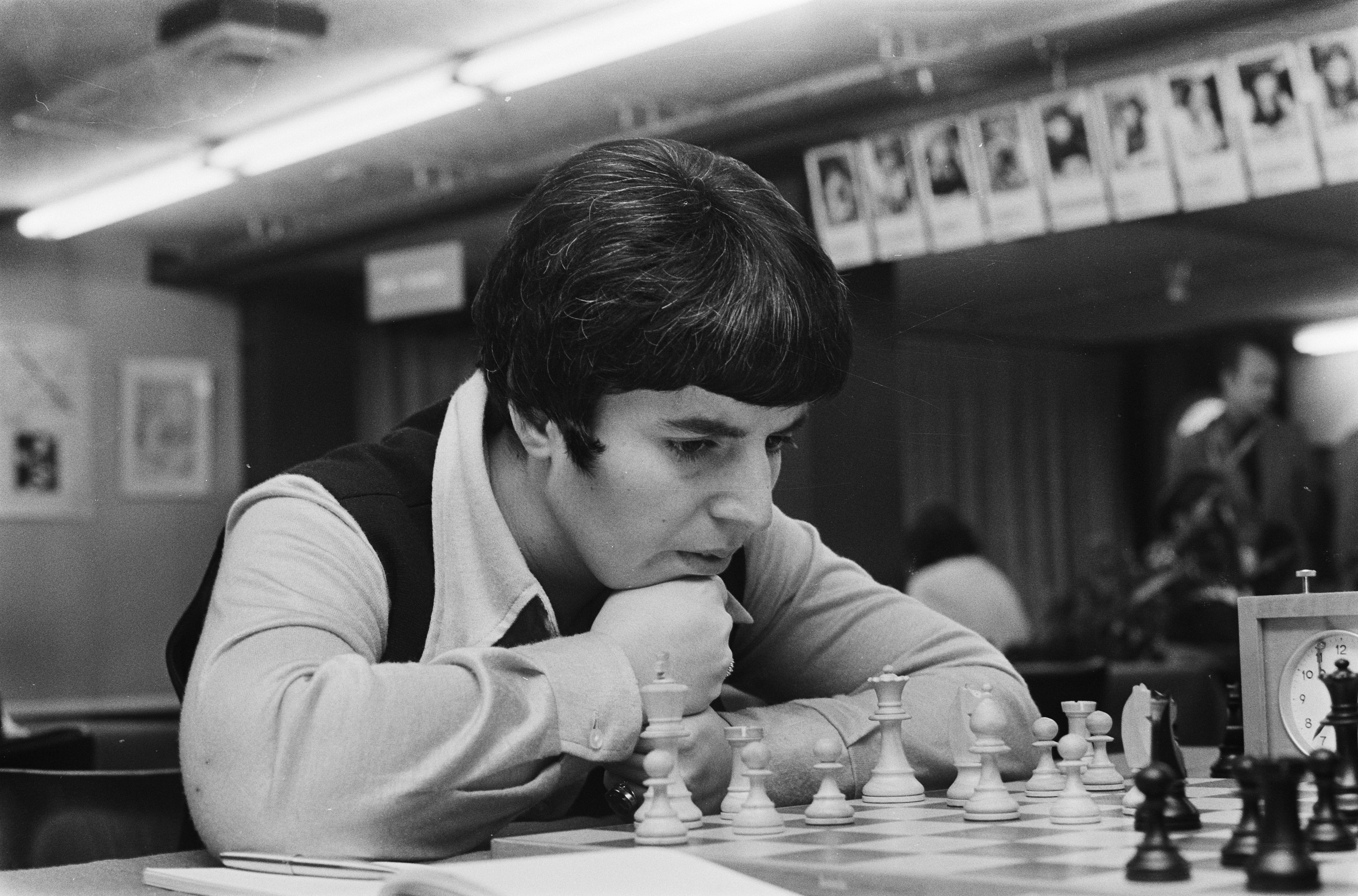
Gaprindashvili in 1975

Gaprindashvili won the Women's Candidates Tournament in 1961, making her eligible to challenge Elisaveta Bykova, the reigning world champion in women's chess. Gaprindashvili's favorite football team, FC Dinamo Tbilisi attended the game as spectators to support her. Gaprindashvili won the 1962 match against Bykova with a large victory of nine points against Bykova's two. The game was adjourned, to be resumed the following morning, but Bykova conceded by phone later that night.

After her victory, Gaprindashvili was a celebrity in Georgia, and crowds gathered to meet her as she returned from the World Championship match. Woman Grandmaster Jennifer Shahade described Gaprindashvili as a symbol of Georgian nationalism and merit during the country's time as a constituent republic of the Soviet Union. Her victory marked the beginning of a "women's chess revolution" in Georgia. Woman Grandmaster Rusudan Goletiani said that this went even further, with her success helping inspire a broader "intellectual revolution" for Georgian women. Many women took up chess afterward, and Georgia became one of the most prominent countries in women's chess, producing numerous masters during Gaprindashvili's career.

Gaprindashvili went on to defend her title successfully three times against the Soviet player Alla Kushnir. In 1975, Gaprindashvili was challenged by the Georgian player Nana Alexandria. The competition between the two Georgians was widely followed in their home country; Gaprindashvili won with 8.5 points against Alexandria's 3.5.

During her career Gaprindashvili successfully competed in tournaments that were traditionally played by men, winning, amongst others, the Hastings Challengers tournament in 1963/4. She tied for second place at Sandomierz in 1976, tied for first place at Lone Pine International in 1977, and tied for second at the Dortmund Sparkassen Chess Meeting in 1978. Her performance at Lone Pine made her the first woman ever to earn a norm for the title of Grandmaster. Her win at Lone Pine was also the first elite tournament victory by a woman. Her performances at Sandomierz and Dortmund did not earn grandmaster norms, which would have contributed to her earning a Grandmaster title, as she was one-half point short in each case. At the meeting of the FIDE Congress in 1978, Gaprindashvili was awarded the title of Grandmaster, although the normal requirement was three norms totaling 24 games. She considers her Lone Pine performance and her subsequent awarding of Grandmaster to be her greatest achievement in chess.

The same year, Gaprindashvili was challenged for her title by another Georgian player, Maia Chiburdanidze, who was only seventeen years old at the time of the tournament. Their first three rounds were draws. Chiburdanidze then won three rounds in a row, followed by two victories for Gaprindashvili. The final round was to determine who would take the championship. It was won by Chiburdanidze, and Gaprindashvili lost her title as world champion.

== Later career ==
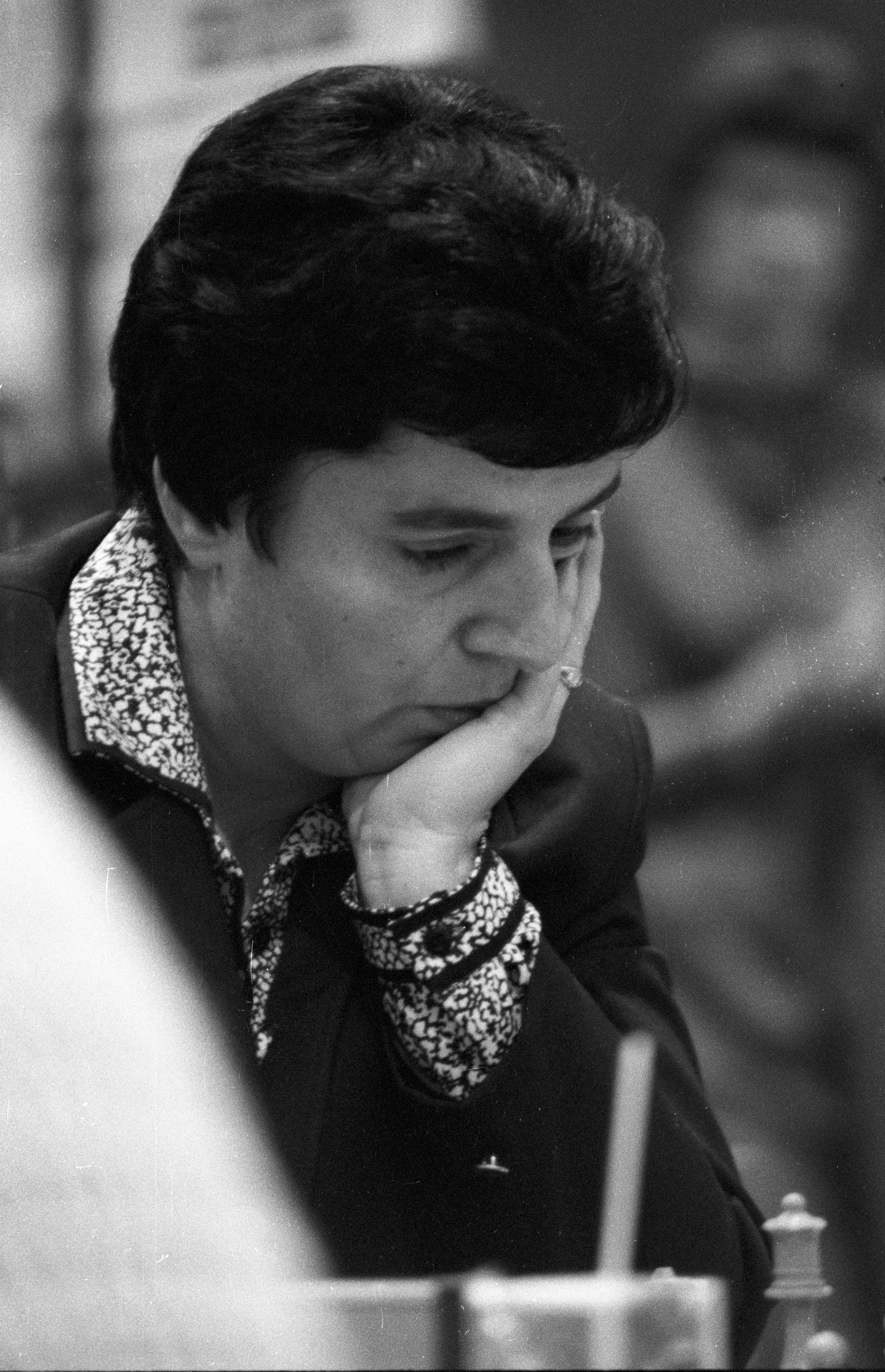
Gaprindashvili in 1982

Gaprindashvili played for the Soviet Union in the Women's Chess Olympiads of 1963, 1966, 1969, 1972, 1974, 1978, 1980, 1982, 1984, 1986, 1990, and for Georgia in 1992. She was one of the contributing players of the Soviet Union team that dominated the Women's Olympiads of the 1980s. She won 25 medals, including eleven team gold medals and nine individual gold medals. At the Olympiad of Dubai 1986 she won all ten games she played. Gaprindashvili was a five-time winner of the USSR Women's Chess Championship: in 1964, 1973/74, 1981, 1983, and 1985. She achieved her peak FIDE rating of 2495 in July 1987. Gaprindashvili went on to train young female chess players, including Ana Matnadze and Tea Lanchava. As of her 2022 win, she has eight victories at the Women's World Senior Championship, a championship for female players at least 65 years of age.

Besides chess, Gaprindashvili was also active politically, serving as a member of the Soviet Parliament of Georgia. She then served as president of the Georgian National Olympic Committee from 1989 to 1996. She was active in the protests against President Eduard Shevardnadze in 2002. Gaprindashvili was then among the most prominent members of the People's Assembly, a political opposition movement that protested the presidency of Mikheil Saakashvili. She and the People's Assembly were involved in the 2011 Georgian protests.

In 2005, at the age of 64, Gaprindashvili won the BDO Chess Tournament held in Haarlem, the Netherlands, with a score of 6½/10 points and a performance rating of 2510. In 2020, she appeared in the documentary Glory to the Queen, alongside Nana Alexandria, Maia Chiburdanidze and Nana Ioseliani.

The Netflix series The Queen's Gambit and its story were influenced by Gaprindashvili's life. The show erroneously described her as a Russian chess player who had never competed against men, while in fact she had played against at least 59 men by 1968 (including 10 male grandmasters), and is actually from Georgia. In response, she filed a lawsuit against Netflix for US$5 million for false light, invasion of privacy, and defamation on 16 September 2021. In September 2022, Netflix settled with Gaprindashvili on undisclosed terms.

== Personal life ==
In December 1969, Gaprindashvili married Anzor Chichinadze in Tbilisi.

== Playing style and philosophy ==
Gaprindashvili has been noted for her competitiveness and aggressive playing style. Following her victory over Bykova in 1962, it became common for young female chess players to emulate Gaprindashvili's style of aggressive and technical play. As a child, Gaprindashvili had a reputation for handling losses poorly. She has expressed an appreciation for the fact that arbitrators do not have a significant role in chess, having seen problems in other sports. Gaprindashvili has said that she does not like to compare chess players, as she sees each chess player as having their own body of work rather than a single factor that can be compared. Among those she considers great chess players, she has listed Bobby Fischer, Mikhail Tal, and Paul Morphy.

== Honors and awards ==
Gaprindashvili was awarded the Presidential Order of Excellence in 2015 by President of Georgia Giorgi Margvelashvili for "her outstanding contribution to the country and nation" and "representing Georgia at an international level". In 2013, she was inducted into the World Chess Hall of Fame.

Tbilisi's Chess Palace is dedicated to Gaprindashvili. The town of Zugdidi put up a statue in Gaprindashvili's honor. On her 60th birthday, the government of Georgia gave her two cars. In 2016, FIDE President Kirsan Ilyumzhinov gave her a representation of Caïssa, in the shape of a chess queen, made by the Lobortas Classic Jewelry House.

== Bibliography ==
- Shahade, Jennifer (2022). Chess Queens: The True Story of a Chess Champion and the Greatest Female Players of All Time. Hodder & Stoughton. ISBN 9781399701402.
- Soltis, Andrew (2014). Soviet Chess 1917–1991. McFarland. ISBN 978-0-7864-9758-4.

Preceded by Elisaveta Bykova	Women's World Chess Champion; 1962–1978	Succeeded by Maia Chiburdanidze
