= Women's World Chess Championship 1984 =

International chess competition

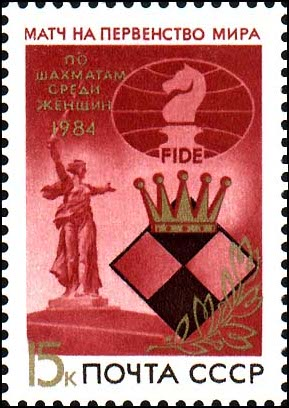
A Soviet stamp dedicated to the Women's World Chess Championship 1984

The 1984 Women's World Chess Championship was won by Maia Chiburdanidze, who successfully defended her title against challenger Irina Levitina.

== 1982 Interzonals ==
As part of the qualification process, two Interzonal tournaments were held, one in Bad Kissingen in July and the other in Tbilisi in September 1982, featuring the best players from each FIDE zone. A total of 31 players took part, with the top three from each Interzonal qualifying for the Candidates Tournament.

In Bad Kissingen, ex-champion Gaprindashvili took first place and qualified along with Semenova and Lematschko.

Mureşan won in Tbilisi, ahead of Levitina and Liu (the first Chinese player to qualify for a Candidates Tournament).

1982 Women's Interzonal, Bad Kissingen
	Player	1	2	3	4	5	6	7	8	9	10	11	12	13	14	15	16	Points	Tie break
1	Nona Gaprindashvili (Soviet Union)	-	0	½	½	1	½	1	1	½	1	1	1	1	1	1	1	12	
2	Lidia Semenova (Soviet Union)	1	-	½	1	1	½	0	1	1	½	½	1	1	1	½	1	11½	
3	Tatjana Lematschko (Switzerland)	½	½	-	0	½	1	1	½	½	1	1	1	1	½	1	1	11	
4	Eliska Klimova (Czechoslovakia)	½	0	1	-	0	1	½	1	1	½	1	1	½	½	1	1	10½	69.00
5	Barbara Hund (West Germany)	0	0	½	1	-	0	½	½	1	1	1	1	1	1	1	1	10½	62.25
6	Marta Litinskaya (Soviet Union)	½	½	0	0	1	-	½	0	1	1	1	½	1	1	1	1	10	
7	Marina Pogorevici (Romania)	0	1	0	½	½	½	-	½	½	1	½	1	½	1	1	1	9½	
8	Elena Fatalibekova (Soviet Union)	0	0	½	0	½	1	½	-	0	½	½	½	1	½	½	1	7	44.75
9	Suzana Maksimović (Yugoslavia)	½	0	½	0	0	0	½	1	-	0	1	0	1	½	1	1	7	40.75
10	Mária Ivánka (Hungary)	0	½	0	½	0	0	0	½	1	-	1	1	1	0	½	1	7	40.00
11	Erika Belle (Netherlands)	0	½	0	0	0	0	½	½	0	0	-	1	1	½	1	0	5	
12	Borislava Borisova (Sweden)	0	0	0	0	0	½	0	½	1	0	0	-	0	½	1	1	4½	23.50
13	Nava Shterenberg (Canada)	0	0	0	½	0	0	½	0	0	0	0	1	-	1	½	1	4½	23.00
14	Hanna Ereńska-Radzewska (Poland)	0	0	½	½	0	0	0	½	½	1	½	½	0	-	0	0	4	
15	Giovanna Arbunic (Chile)	0	½	0	0	0	0	0	½	0	½	0	0	½	1	-	0	3	19.00
16	Rachel Crotto (USA)	0	0	0	0	0	0	0	0	0	0	1	0	0	1	1	-	3	12.00

1982 Women's Interzonal, Tbilisi
	Player	1	2	3	4	5	6	7	8	9	10	11	12	13	14	15	Points	Tie break
1	Margareta Mureşan (Romania)	-	½	1	1	1	½	½	1	0	½	1	1	½	1	1	10½	
2	Irina Levitina (Soviet Union)	½	-	½	½	1	½	½	½	1	½	½	½	1	1	1	9½	
3	Liu Shilan (China)	0	½	-	½	0	½	0	1	1	1	½	1	1	1	1	9	
4	Nieves García (Spain)	0	½	½	-	½	1	1	½	½	0	1	½	½	½	1	8	51.75
5	Elena Akhmilovskaya (Soviet Union)	0	0	1	½	-	0	1	1	0	½	1	1	½	1	½	8	51.50
6	Nino Gurieli (Soviet Union)	½	½	½	0	1	-	½	0	0	1	1	½	1	½	1	8	51.00
7	Tamara Minogina (Soviet Union)	½	½	1	0	0	½	-	1	½	½	½	½	½	½	1	7½	49.75
8	Natalia Titorenko (Soviet Union)	0	½	0	½	0	1	0	-	1	1	1	0	1	½	1	7½	45.75
9	Gisela Fischdick (West Germany)	1	0	0	½	1	1	½	0	-	½	0	0	1	½	1	7	
10	Zsuzsa Veroci-Petronic (Hungary)	½	½	0	1	½	0	½	0	½	-	½	½	½	½	1	6½	41.75
11	Zorica Nikolin (Yugoslavia)	0	½	½	0	0	0	½	0	1	½	-	½	1	1	1	6½	37.50
12	Amalija Pihajlić (Yugoslavia)	0	½	0	½	0	½	½	1	1	½	½	-	½	0	0	5½	
13	Rohini Khadilkar (India)	½	0	0	½	½	0	½	0	0	½	0	½	-	1	1	5	29.50
14	Diane Savereide (USA)	0	0	0	½	0	½	½	½	½	½	0	1	0	-	1	5	29.25
15	Ilse Guggenberger (Colombia)	0	0	0	0	½	0	0	0	0	0	0	1	0	0	-	1½	

== 1983-84 Candidates matches ==
The six qualifiers from the Interzonals were joined by two seeded players: Alexandria, who had lost the last championship match, and Ioseliani, who had lost the previous Candidates final.

These eight players contested a knock-out series of matches. Levitina won the final, earning the right to challenge the reigning champion for the title.

Quarterfinals
Lvov, Mar 1983
(Soviet Union) Irina Levitina	6
(Soviet Union) Nona Gaprindashvili	4
Alicante, 1983
(Soviet Union) Nana Alexandria	5½
(Switzerland) Tatjana Lematschko	4½
Bad Kissingen, Mar 1983
(Soviet Union) Lidia Semenova	5½
(Romania) Margareta Mureşan	4½
Velden, Mar 1983
(China) Liu Shilan	3
(Soviet Union) Nana Ioseliani	6

Semifinals
Dubna, Nov 1983
(Soviet Union) Irina Levitina	7½
(Soviet Union) Nana Alexandria	6½
Sochi, Nov 1983
(Soviet Union) Lidia Semenova	5½
(Soviet Union) Nana Ioseliani	4½

Final
Sochi, Mar 1984
(Soviet Union) Irina Levitina	7
(Soviet Union) Lidia Semenova	5

== 1984 Championship Match ==
The championship match was played in Volgograd from early September to October 19, 1984. Unlike the previous match three years before, champion Chiburdanidze had no problems this time. She beat challenger Levitina with a comfortable margin of three points and retained her title

Women's World Championship Match 1984
	1	2	3	4	5	6	7	8	9	10	11	12	13	14	Total
Irina Levitina (Soviet Union)	½	½	1	0	½	½	½	1	0	0	½	0	0	½	5½
Maia Chiburdanidze (Soviet Union)	½	½	0	1	½	½	½	0	1	1	½	1	1	½	8½
