= Antje Göhler =

German chess player (born 1967)

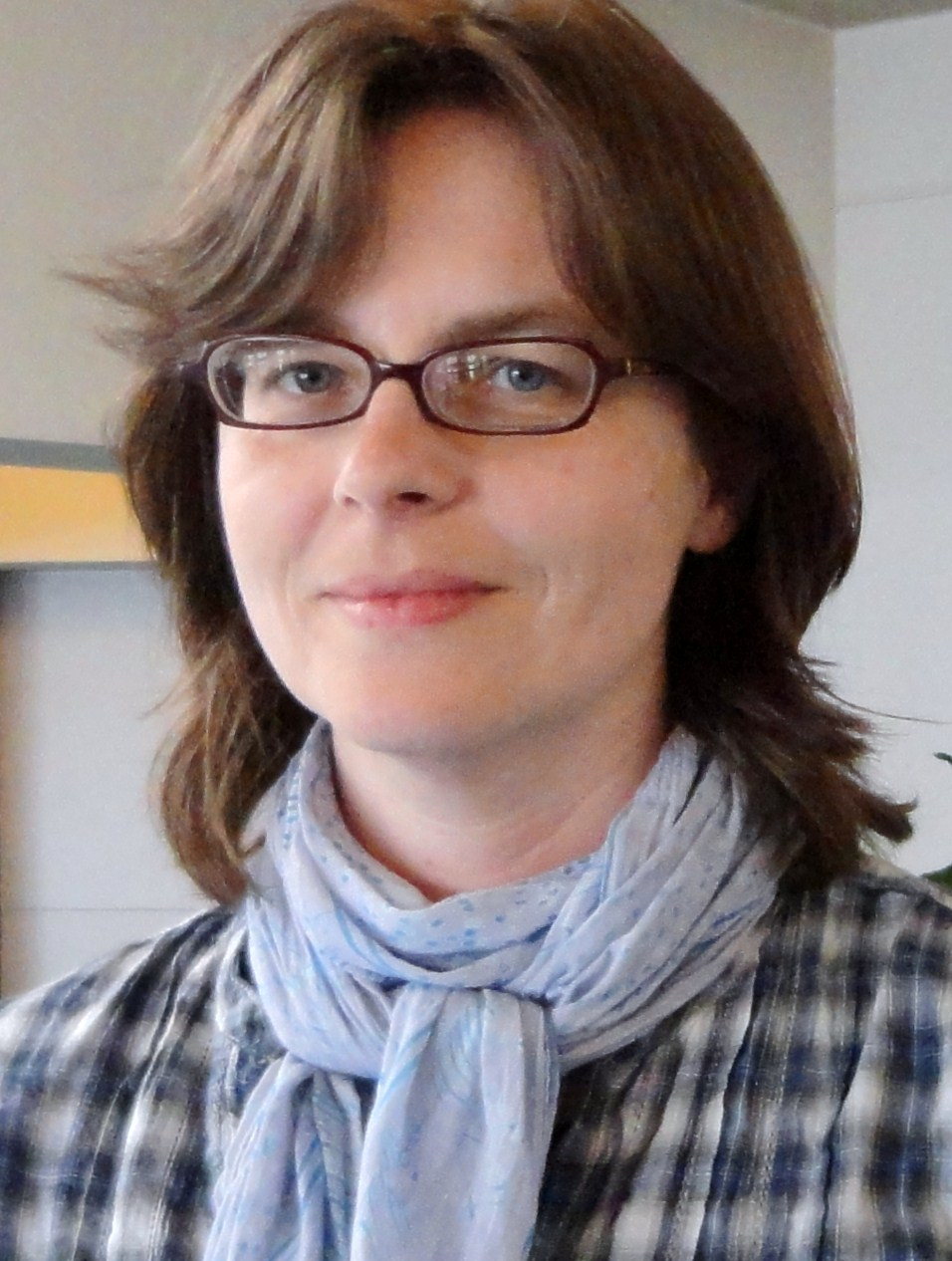
- Antje Göhler in Chess Women's Bundesliga (2012)

Personal information
- Born: 18 October 1967 (age 58) Berlin, Germany

Chess career
- Country: Germany
- Title: Woman International Master (1988)
- Peak rating: 2220 (July 1987)

Antje Göhler (née Riedel; born 18 October 1967) is a German chess Woman International Master (1988) who won East Germany Women's Chess Championship (1988). She is Doctor (PhD) in German studies.

== Life ==
Antje Göhler was coached by Peter Höhne. She was a student at the EOS Heinrich Schliemann when she took part in an East Germany Women's Chess Championship for the first time in 1985 and ranked in 4th place. In the same year she achieved the norm of Women FIDE Master and successfully led a training group of eight to ten-year-old boys and girls. In 1988 she won the 37th East Germany Women's Chess Championship. After completing her German studies in Leipzig in 1992, she lived with her family in Berlin, Bonn, Warsaw, Rome and Tashkent. She completed her research on literary expressionism and its reception of antiquity in 2011 with a doctorate from the Fernuniversität in Hagen. In 2014 she published her debut novel Balcke oder Der Hypermoderne Prometheus.

== Chess career ==
=== Individual Championships ===
As Antje Riedel, she played at the East Germany Women's Chess Championships in 1985 in Jüterbog (Marion Heintze won), 1986 in Nordhausen (Carola Manger won), 1987 in Glauchau (third place behind Iris Bröder and Marion Heintze), 1988 in Stralsund (first before Marion Heintze, Annett Wagner-Michel, Iris Bröder and Gundula Nehse) and in 1989 in Zittau (Kerstin Kunze won).

In 1985 and 1987 she won the East Germany Women's Blitz Championships.

In the women's grandmasters chess tournament in 1988 in Sochi she scored 6 points from 13 games, behind five Woman Grandmaster: Irina Levitina - 10, Tatiana Stepovaya - 9, Tatiana Shumiakina and Tatyana Rubtsova - 8 points each and Valentina Kozlovskaya 7.5 points.

=== Team Championships ===
She won the East Germany Women's Team Blitz Championships five times: in 1983, 1984, 1985, 1989 and 1990, each time with the BSG AdW Berlin team.

In the Chess Women's Bundesligashe 1991-92 season for the SSV Rotation Berlin team, she scored 7.5 points in 11 games. She then played for SSV Rotation Berlin from 1992-93 to 1996-97, 1998–99 and 1999-2000 and from 2001-02 to 2003-04. In 2004-05, 2006–07, 2008–09 and 2011-12 she played for the team of the association Rotation Pankow. In the intervening years she played in the second Chess Women's Bundesliga.

== Publications ==
- Antje Göhler: Antique Reception in Literary Expressionism, Frank & Timme, Berlin, 2012. ISBN 978-3865963772
- Antje Göhler: Balcke or the hypermodern Prometheus. Novel. Elektroischer Verlag, Berlin 2014. ISBN 978-3-943889-62-8
