= Women's World Chess Championship 1986 =

The 1986 Women's World Chess Championship was won by Maia Chiburdanidze, who successfully defended her title against challenger Elena Akhmilovskaya.

== 1985 Interzonals ==
As part of the qualification process, two Interzonal tournaments were held in June 1985, one in Havana and the other in Zeleznovodsk, featuring the best players from each FIDE zone. A total of 30 players took part, with the top three from each Interzonal qualifying for the Candidates Tournament.

In Havana, Alexandria and Akhmilovskaya took first and second place and qualified directly. Cramling took the last spot in the Candidates after winning a playoff against Ioseliani and Terescenco-Nutu.

Litinskaya won in Zeleznovodsk, ahead of Wu and Brustman; the latter only qualified after a playoff against Zaitseva.

1985 Women's Interzonal, Havana
	Player	1	2	3	4	5	6	7	8	9	10	11	12	13	14	Points	Tie break
1	Nana Alexandria (Soviet Union)	-	1	½	½	½	½	½	½	1	1	1	1	1	1	10	
2	Elena Akhmilovskaya (Soviet Union)	0	-	1	1	1	½	½	½	½	1	1	½	1	1	9½	
3	Pia Cramling (Sweden)	½	½	-	½	1	0	1	½	1	½	1	1	1	0	8½	53.00
4	Nana Ioseliani (Soviet Union)	½	½	½	-	1	½	0	0	1	1	1	1	½	1	8½	50.00
5	Daniela Terescenco-Nutu (Romania)	½	½	0	0	-	½	1	1	1	1	0	1	1	1	8½	48.25
6	Zsuzsa Veroci-Petronic (Hungary)	½	0	1	½	½	-	½	1	½	½	0	½	½	1	7	44.00
7	Gulnar Sakhatova (Soviet Union)	½	0	0	1	0	½	-	½	0	1	1	½	1	1	7	37.25
8	Susan Walker (England)	½	0	½	1	0	0	½	-	½	1	0	1	1	½	6½	38.25
9	An Yangfeng (China)	0	0	0	0	0	½	1	½	-	1	1	½	1	1	6½	30.75
10	Diane Savereide (USA)	0	½	½	0	0	½	0	0	0	-	1	1	1	1	5½	
11	Zirka Frometa (Cuba)	0	0	0	0	1	1	0	1	0	0	-	0	½	½	4	24.75
12	Asela De Armas (Cuba)	0	½	0	0	0	½	½	0	½	0	1	-	½	½	4	21.75
13	Nava Shterenberg (Canada)	0	0	0	½	0	½	0	0	0	0	½	½	-	1	3	
14	Stepanka Vokralova (West Germany)	0	0	1	0	0	0	0	½	0	0	½	½	0	-	2½	

1985 Women's Interzonal, Zeleznovodsk
	Player	1	2	3	4	5	6	7	8	9	10	11	12	13	14	15	16	Points	Tie break
1	Marta Litinskaya (Soviet Union)	-	1	0	1	1	½	½	½	1	½	1	½	1	½	1	1	11	
2	Wu Mingqian (China)	0	-	½	1	1	1	1	0	0	½	1	1	½	1	1	1	10½	
3	Agnieszka Brustman (Poland)	1	½	-	0	½	0	1	½	1	0	1	1	1	½	1	1	10	67.25
4	Ludmila Zaitseva (Soviet Union)	0	0	1	-	½	½	½	½	1	1	0	1	1	1	1	1	10	63.50
5	Svetlana Matveeva (Soviet Union)	0	0	½	½	-	1	1	½	1	½	1	½	½	1	½	1	9½	64.75
6	Nona Gaprindashvili (Soviet Union)	½	0	1	½	0	-	0	1	1	1	½	1	½	½	1	1	9½	62.75
7	Nino Gurieli (Soviet Union)	½	0	0	½	0	1	-	½	0	½	1	1	1	1	1	1	9	
8	Margareta Mureşan (Romania)	½	1	½	½	½	0	½	-	0	1	0	½	1	1	½	½	8	
9	Nina Høiberg (Denmark)	0	1	0	0	0	0	1	1	-	0	0	½	1	1	1	1	7½	
10	Lena Glaz (Israel)	½	½	1	0	½	0	½	0	1	-	0	0	1	½	1	½	7	49.25
11	Giovanna Arbunic (Chile)	0	0	0	1	0	½	0	1	1	1	-	½	1	0	½	½	7	48.00
12	Mária Ivánka (Hungary)	½	0	0	0	½	0	0	½	½	1	½	-	0	0	1	1	5½	
13	Rohini Khadilkar (India)	0	½	0	0	½	½	0	0	0	0	0	1	-	1	1	½	5	
14	Liu Shilan (China)	½	0	½	0	0	½	0	0	0	½	1	1	0	-	0	½	4½	
15	Julia Lebel-Arias (France)	0	0	0	0	½	0	0	½	0	0	½	0	0	1	-	½	3	18.25
16	Pepita Ferrer (Spain)	0	0	0	0	0	0	0	½	0	½	½	0	½	½	½	-	3	17.25

== 1986 Candidates Tournament ==
The six qualifiers from the Interzonals were joined by two seeded players: Levitina, who had lost the last championship match, and Semenova, who had lost the previous Candidates final.

In a change from the knock-out system used in the last five championship cycles, the Candidates Tournament in this cycle was contested as a double round-robin tournament in Malmö in February 1986. Even though she lost ½-1½ to both her closest competitors, Akhmilovskaya still won the tournament by half a point, earning the right to challenge the reigning champion for the title.

1986 Women's Candidates Tournament
	Player	1	2	3	4	5	6	7	8	Points	Tie break
1	Elena Akhmilovskaya (Soviet Union)	-	½	½	1½	1½	1½	2	2	9½	
2	Nana Alexandria (Soviet Union)	1½	-	1	1	1	1½	1	2	9	
3	Marta Litinskaya-Shul (Soviet Union)	1½	1	-	1	1	1	½	2	8	
4	Pia Cramling (Sweden)	½	1	1	-	2	½	1½	½	7	49.50
5	Lidia Semenova (Soviet Union)	½	1	1	0	-	1½	1½	1½	7	45.00
6	Agnieszka Brustman (Poland)	½	½	1	1½	½	-	1	1½	6½	
7	Irina Levitina (Soviet Union)	0	1	1½	½	½	1	-	1½	6	
8	Wu Mingqian (China)	0	0	0	1½	½	½	½	-	3	

== 1986 Championship Match ==
The championship match was played in Sofia in 1986. Once again, defending champion Chiburdanidze had no real problems. She beat challenger Akhmilovskaya with a comfortable margin of three points and retained her title.

Women's World Championship Match 1986
	1	2	3	4	5	6	7	8	9	10	11	12	13	14	Total
Maia Chiburdanidze (Soviet Union)	1	½	½	½	1	½	1	1	0	½	½	½	½	½	8½
Elena Akhmilovskaya (Soviet Union)	0	½	½	½	0	½	0	0	1	½	½	½	½	½	5½
