= Women's World Chess Championship 1988 =

The 1988 Women's World Chess Championship was won by Maia Chiburdanidze, who successfully defended her title against challenger Nana Ioseliani.

== 1987 Interzonals ==
As part of the qualification process, two Interzonal tournaments were held in the summer of 1987, one in Smederevska Palanka in July and the other in Tuzla in July and August, featuring the best players from each FIDE zone. A total of 34 players took part, with the top three from each Interzonal qualifying for the Candidates Tournament.

Litinskaya-Shul won in Smederevska Palanka, while three players shared second place. They then contested a playoff in Tbilisi in September, which was won by ex-champion Gaprindashvili (3/4 points) ahead of ex-challenger Levitina (2½/4), while Klimova-Richtrova (½/4) was eliminated.

Ioseliani and Arakhamia took first and second place in Tuzla, while Brustman clinched the last spot in the Candidates after winning a playoff against Semenova 4-1.

1987 Women's Interzonal, Smederevska Palanka
	Player	1	2	3	4	5	6	7	8	9	10	11	12	13	14	15	16	Points	Tie break
1	Marta Litinskaya-Shul (Soviet Union)	-	½	0	1	1	1	1	½	0	0	1	1	1	1	1	1	11	
2	Irina Levitina (Soviet Union)	½	-	½	0	1	1	½	0	1	½	½	1	1	1	1	1	10½	68.50
3	Nona Gaprindashvili (Soviet Union)	1	½	-	½	½	½	½	0	½	½	1	1	1	1	1	1	10½	67.75
4	Eliska Klimova-Richtrova (Czechoslovakia)	0	1	½	-	½	0	½	0	1	1	1	1	1	1	1	1	10½	65.00
5	Zoja Lelchuk (Soviet Union)	0	0	½	½	-	1	1	½	0	1	1	½	1	1	1	1	10	
6	Ildikó Mádl (Hungary)	0	0	½	1	0	-	1	1	½	1	½	1	0	1	1	1	9½	61.50
7	Inna Izrailov (USA)	0	½	½	½	0	0	-	½	½	1	1	1	1	1	1	1	9½	55.25
8	Alisa Marić (Yugoslavia)	½	1	1	1	½	0	½	-	0	½	0	1	1	1	½	½	9	66.50
9	Susan Arkell (England)	1	0	½	0	1	½	½	1	-	0	1	½	½	½	1	1	9	61.50
10	Margarita Voiska (Bulgaria)	1	½	½	0	0	0	0	½	1	-	1	½	½	0	0	1	6½	
11	An Yangfeng (China)	0	½	0	0	0	½	0	1	0	0	-	0	½	1	1	1	5½	29.50
12	Wu Mingqian (China)	0	0	0	0	½	0	0	0	½	½	1	-	1	½	½	1	5½	28.50
13	Gordana Marković-Jovanović (Yugoslavia)	0	0	0	0	0	1	0	0	½	½	½	0	-	½	1	1	5	
14	Asela De Armas (Cuba)	0	0	0	0	0	0	0	0	½	1	0	½	½	-	½	1	4	
15	Joara Chaves (Brazil)	0	0	0	0	0	0	0	½	0	1	0	½	0	½	-	0	2½	
16	Christina Nyberg (Sweden)	0	0	0	0	0	0	0	½	0	0	0	0	0	0	1	-	1½	

1987 Women's Interzonal, Tuzla
	Player	1	2	3	4	5	6	7	8	9	10	11	12	13	14	15	16	17	18	Points	Tie break
1	Nana Ioseliani (Soviet Union)	-	1	½	½	½	½	½	½	1	1	1	1	½	½	1	1	1	1	13	
2	Ketevan Arakhamia (Soviet Union)	0	-	0	0	1	0	1	1	0	1	1	1	1	1	1	1	1	1	12	
3	Lidia Semenova (Soviet Union)	½	1	-	½	½	1	1	1	½	0	0	½	1	1	0	1	1	1	11½	93.75
4	Agnieszka Brustman (Poland)	½	1	½	-	1	½	½	1	½	½	0	½	0	1	1	1	1	1	11½	92.25
5	Gulnar Sakhatova (Soviet Union)	½	0	½	0	-	1	½	½	1	0	1	1	½	0	1	1	1	1	10½	
6	Zsuzsa Veroci-Petronic (Hungary)	½	1	0	½	0	-	1	½	1	½	1	½	1	½	0	1	0	1	10	82.25
7	Nina Høiberg (Denmark)	½	0	0	½	½	0	-	0	1	1	1	1	½	1	1	0	1	1	10	73.50
8	Mária Ivánka (Hungary)	½	0	0	0	½	½	1	-	½	1	½	1	½	0	½	½	1	1	9	67.50
9	Svetlana Matveeva (Soviet Union)	0	1	½	½	0	0	0	½	-	½	½	0	1	1	1	½	1	1	9	66.00
10	Liu Shilan (China)	0	0	1	½	1	½	0	0	½	-	1	1	½	½	½	0	½	1	8½	
11	Marija Petrović (Yugoslavia)	0	0	1	1	0	0	0	½	½	0	-	½	1	0	1	1	0	1	7½	57.25
12	Suzana Maksimović (Yugoslavia)	0	0	½	½	0	½	0	0	1	0	½	-	0	1	½	1	1	1	7½	52.25
13	Rohini Khadilkar (India)	½	0	0	1	½	0	½	½	0	½	0	1	-	½	½	½	½	½	7	57.50
14	Bettina Trabert (West Germany)	½	0	0	0	1	½	0	1	0	½	1	0	½	-	0	½	½	1	7	54.00
15	Zorica Nikolin (Yugoslavia)	0	0	1	0	0	1	0	½	0	½	0	½	½	1	-	0	1	0	6	49.00
16	Teresa Canela (Spain)	0	0	0	0	0	0	1	½	½	1	0	0	½	½	1	-	½	½	6	44.00
17	Zirka Frometa (Cuba)	0	0	0	0	0	1	0	0	0	½	1	0	½	½	0	½	-	½	4½	
18	Julia Lebel-Arias (France)	0	0	0	0	0	0	0	0	0	0	0	0	½	0	1	½	½	-	2½	

== 1988 Candidates Tournament ==
The six qualifiers from the Interzonals were joined by the top two from the previous Candidates: Akhmilovskaya and Alexandria.

Like the previous cycle, the Candidates Tournament in this cycle was contested as a double round-robin tournament in Tsqaltubo in January 1988. Isoseliani and Akhmilovskaya (the challenger from the previous cycle) tied for first place, but Ioseliani won the subsequent playoff 3-2, earning the right to challenge the reigning champion for the title.

1988 Women's Candidates Tournament
	Player	Rating	1	2	3	4	5	6	7	8	Points	Tie break
1	Nana Ioseliani (Soviet Union)	2455	-	1½	½	1½	1	2	1½	2	10	62.25
2	Elena Akhmilovskaya (Soviet Union)	2400	½	-	1½	1½	1½	2	2	1	10	62.25
3	Irina Levitina (Soviet Union)	2355	1½	½	-	½	1½	1	1½	1½	8	51.25
4	Marta Litinskaya-Shul (Soviet Union)	2415	½	½	1½	-	1	1	1½	2	8	47.75
5	Nana Alexandria (Soviet Union)	2415	1	½	½	1	-	1	1	1½	6½	
6	Agnieszka Brustman (Poland)	2395	0	0	1	1	1	-	1	1½	5½	
7	Nona Gaprindashvili (Soviet Union)	2485	½	0	½	½	1	1	-	1	4½	
8	Ketevan Arakhamia (Soviet Union)	2420	0	1	½	0	½	½	1	-	3½	

== 1988 Championship Match ==
The championship match was played in Telavi in 1988. This time, challenger Ioseliani put real pressure on the champion, especially when she won the penultimate game, reducing Chiburdanidze's lead to one point. In the end, however, the champion forced a draw with Black in the last game and held onto her title (in what would turn out to be her last successful defense).

Women's World Championship Match 1988
	1	2	3	4	5	6	7	8	9	10	11	12	13	14	15	16	Total
Maia Chiburdanidze (Soviet Union)	½	1	½	0	½	½	1	½	½	½	1	½	½	½	0	½	8½
Nana Ioseliani (Soviet Union)	½	0	½	1	½	½	0	½	½	½	0	½	½	½	1	½	7½
