= Kerstin Kunze =

German chess player (born 1971)

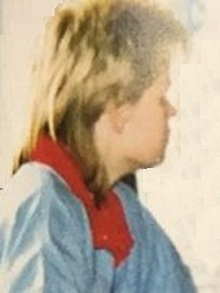
- Kerstin Kunze in 1990

Personal information
- Born: 23 August 1971 (age 54)

Chess career
- Country: Germany
- Title: Woman International Master (2003)
- Peak rating: 2215 (July 1989)

Kerstin Kunze (born 23 August 1971) is a German chess Woman International Master (2003) who won East Germany Women's Chess Championship (1989).

== Chess career ==
At the age of fifteen, Kerstin Kunze took part in an East Germany Women's Chess Championship for the first time. It was February 1987 at the East Germany Women's Chess Championship in Glauchau when Iris Bröder won. Kerstin Kunze scored 50 percent at an international women's tournament in October 1987 in Halle, which Svetlana Prudnikova won. She took part in the East Germany Women's Chess Championship in Stralsund in 1988 when Antje Riedel won. In February 1989 she became East German Women's Chess Champion in Zittau.

Other her tournaments followed:

- in 1989 European Youth Chess Championship in U18 girls group, which Svetlana Matveeva won;
- in 1989 International Women's Chess tournament in Dresden;
- in 1990 East Germany Women's Chess Championship in Bad Blankenburg, which Gundula Nehse won;
- in 1990 International Women's Chess tournament in Dresden, which Zoya Lelchuk won;
- in 1990 World Junior Chess Championship in U20 Girls group in Santiago, which Ketino Kachiani won;
- in 1991 Women's World Chess Championship Zonal Tournament in Graz, which Tatjana Lematschko won;
- in 1992 International Women's Chess tournament in Dresden, won by Margarita Voyska;
- in 1993 she took part in the 11th Berlin Summer chess festival when Karen Movsziszian won.

=== Team Championships ===
In the Chess Women's Bundesliga she played in the seasons 1991/92 for TSV Schott Mainz, 1992/93 for the USV Potsdam, 1994/95 and 1995/96 for the Dresdner SC, 1996/97 and 1999/2000 for the SV Chemie Guben, 2000/01 for the SC Leipzig-Gohlis, as well as 2007/08, 2009/10 and 2010/11 for SAV Torgelow.

She won the Chess Women's Bundesliga with Dresdner SC in the 1994/95 season and the Chess Women's Bundesliga 2012 in blitz chess with USV Potsdam.

=== Other ===
In 2003 she received the title Woman International Master (WIM) from the FIDE in 2003. She achieved the three norms for this in 1989 in Zittau at the East Germany Women's Chess Championship, in 1989 in Dresden at an International Women's Chess tournament and in the Chess Women's Bundesliga (1999/2000).

Īn July 1989 she reached her highest Elo rating - 2215.
