= Borislava Borisova =

Swedish chess player (born 1951)

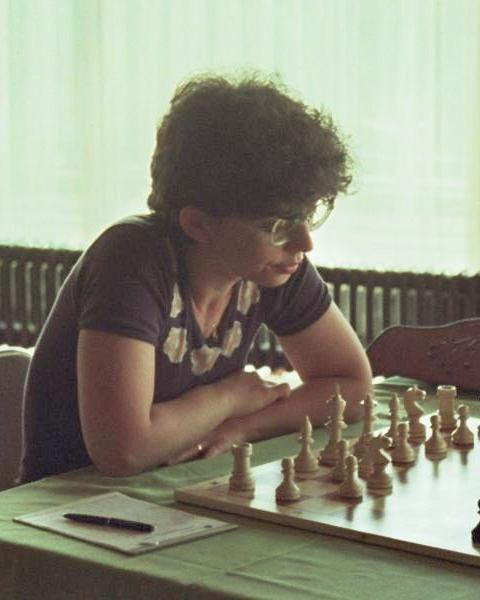
- Borisova in 1982

Personal information
- Born: 27 February 1951 (age 75) Popovo, Bulgaria

Chess career
- Country: Bulgaria (until 1980); Sweden (since 1980)
- Title: Woman International Master (1974)
- Peak rating: 2210 (January 1987)

Borislava Borisova (born 27 February 1951), also Borislava Borisova-Ornstein, is a Bulgarian and Swedish chess player who holds the FIDE title of Woman International Master (1974). She is a winner of the Bulgarian Women's Chess Championship (1976).

== Biography ==
In the late 1970s Borisova was one of the leading Bulgarian women's chess players. She participated several times in the finals of the Bulgarian Women's Chess Championship and won four medals: gold (1976), two silver (1972, 1977) and bronze (1975). After leaving for Sweden she belonged to the top chess players of this country. In 1974, she was awarded the FIDE Woman International Master (WIM) title. Since 1979, she lives in Sweden and is one of the best Swedish women's chess players.

Borisova participated twice in the Women's World Chess Championship Interzonal Tournaments:

- In 1979, at Interzonal Tournament in Rio de Janeiro ranked 10th place;
- In 1982, at Interzonal Tournament in Bad Kissingen shared 12th-13th place.

In the following years, in the Women's World Chess Championship Zonal Tournaments she took the third place twice (in 1985, in Eksjö behind Pia Cramling and Nina Høiberg, and in 1987, in Gausdal behind Nina Høiberg and Christina Nyberg), but not winning promotion to the next stage of the Women's World Chess Championship competition. In 1985 and 1989 she represented Sweden in the chess team Nordic Cup, and in 1985 winning the team gold medal.

Borisova played for Sweden in the Women's Chess Olympiads:

- In 1978, at first board in the 8th Chess Olympiad (women) in Buenos Aires (+7, =3, -1) and won individual bronze medal,
- In 1980, at first board in the 9th Chess Olympiad (women) in Valletta (+5, =4, -2),
- In 1982, at second board in the 10th Chess Olympiad (women) in Lucerne (+5, =5, -4),
- In 1984, at second board in the 26th Chess Olympiad (women) in Thessaloniki (+4, =3, -3),
- In 1988, at second board in the 28th Chess Olympiad (women) in Thessaloniki (+4, =1, -5),
- In 1992, at second board in the 30th Chess Olympiad (women) in Manila (+7, =2, -3) and won individual bronze medal,
- In 1994, at second board in the 31st Chess Olympiad (women) in Moscow (+5, =2, -4).
