= Lena Glaz =

Israeli chess player (born 1961)

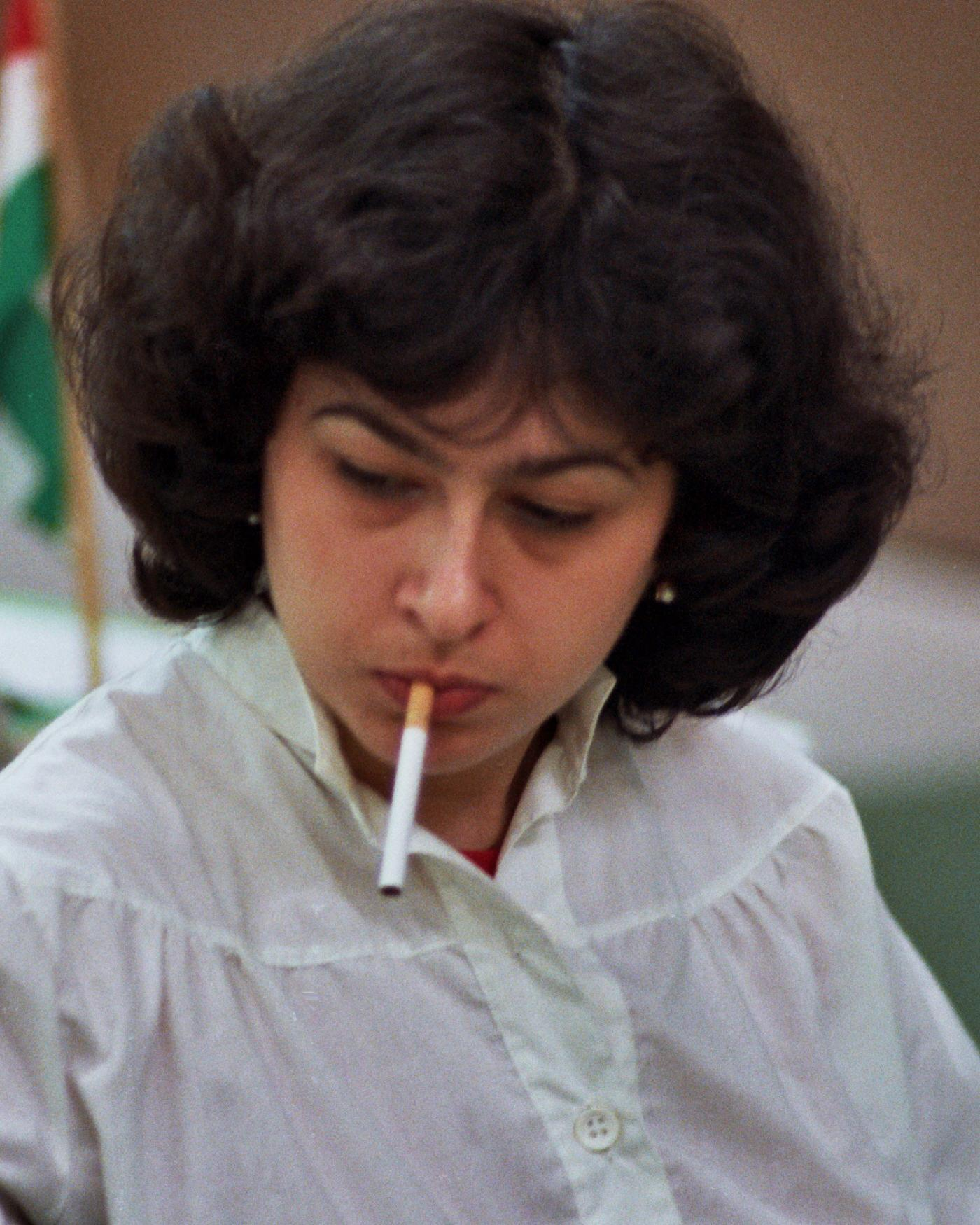
- Glaz in 1982

Personal information
- Native name: לנה גלז
- Born: 23 May 1961 (age 65) Baku, Azerbaijan SSR, Soviet Union

Chess career
- Country: Israel (after 1979); Soviet Union (before 1979)
- Title: Woman International Master (1985)
- Peak rating: 2215 (January 1987)

Lena Glaz (Hebrew: לנה גלז; born 23 May 1961) is an Israeli chess player who holds the title of Woman International Master (WIM, 1985). She won the Israeli Women's Chess Championship in 1980.

== Biography ==
In 1977, Lena Glaz won Azerbaijani Women's Chess Championship. In 1978, she won Soviet sports society Dynamo Women's Chess Championship. In 1979, she moved to Israel. In 1980, Lena Glaz won Israeli Women's Chess Championship. In 1987, Lena Glaz participated in the Women's World Chess Championship Interzonal Tournament in Zheleznovodsk where shared 10th-11th place with Giovanna Arbunic Castro.

Lena Glaz played for Israel in the Women's Chess Olympiads:

- In 1980, at first board in the 9th Chess Olympiad (women) in Valletta (+3, =5, -5),
- In 1982, at first board in the 10th Chess Olympiad (women) in Lucerne (+10, =0, -4),
- In 1988, at second board in the 28th Chess Olympiad (women) in Thessaloniki (+4, =1, -3),
- In 2014, at reserve board in the 41st Chess Olympiad (women) in Tromsø (+2, =1, -1).

In 1985, she was awarded the FIDE Woman International Master (WIM) title. Also, she is FIDE Arbiter (2015) and FIDE Trainer (2016).

Lena Glaz graduated from Hebrew University of Jerusalem and Jerusalem Academy of Music and Dance. She works as a headmaster and child trainer of Beersheba Chess School.
