= Eliška Richtrová =

Czech chess player (born 1959)

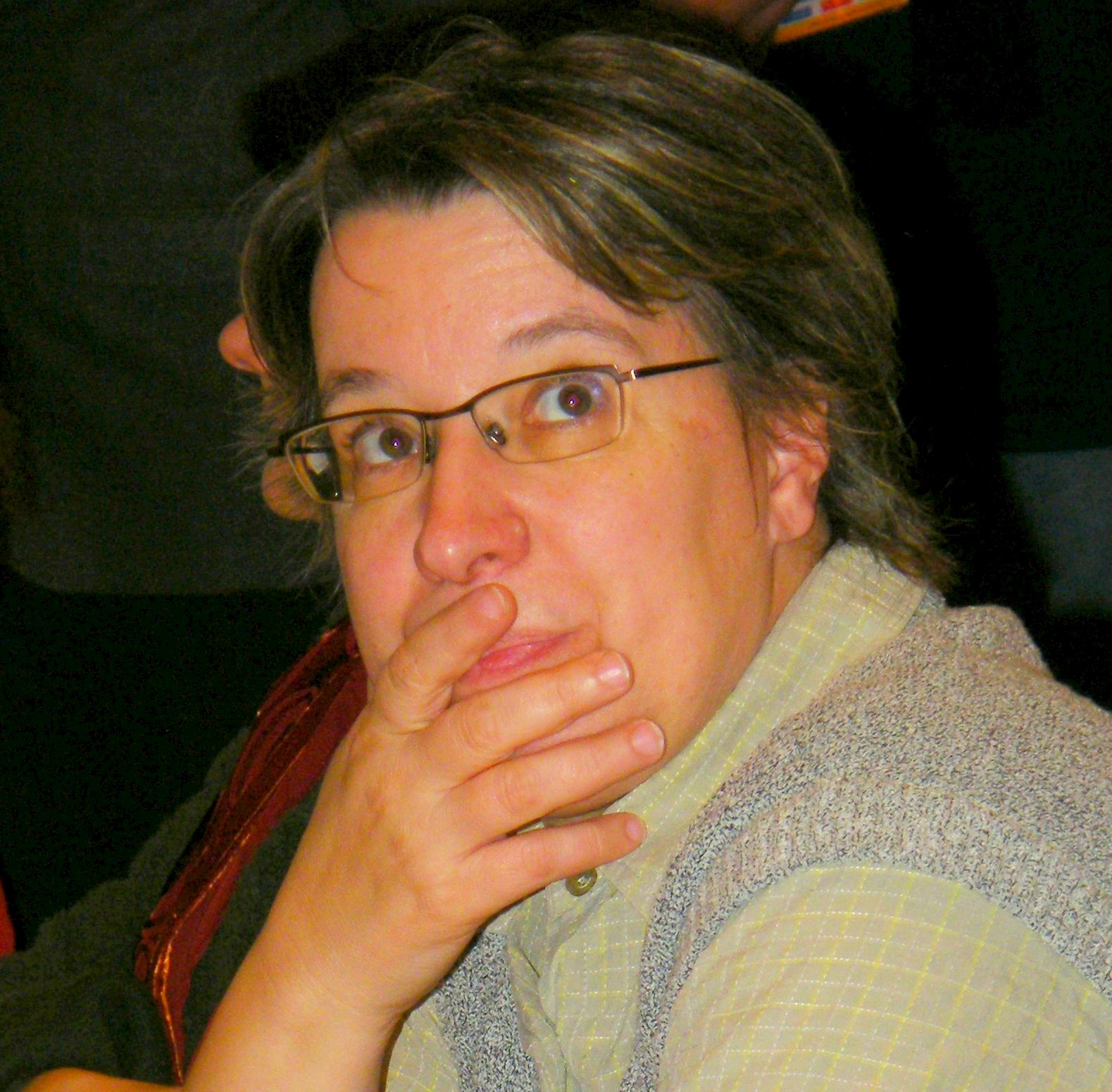
- Richtrová in Dresden, 2008

Personal information
- Born: 1 July 1959 (age 67) Prague, Czechoslovakia

Chess career
- Country: Czechoslovakia; Czech Republic
- Title: Woman Grandmaster (1982)
- Peak rating: 2283 (July 2004)

Eliška Richtrová (née Klímová, also Richtrová-Klímová; born 1 July 1959) is a Czech chess player who holds the FIDE title of Woman Grandmaster (1982). She was a five-time winner of the Czechoslovak Women's Chess Championship (1979, 1980, 1981, 1982, 1988).

== Biography ==
From the end 1970s to the mid-1990s, Eliška Richtrová was one of the leading Czechoslovak women's chess players. In 1978, she won second place at the European Girl's Chess Cup. She won the Czechoslovak Women's Chess Championships five times: 1979, 1980, 1981, 1982, 1988. Also she two times finished as silver medalist: in 1977 and in 1978. Two-time champion of the Czech Republic in rapid chess in 2006 and in 2011, a bronze medal in 2013. In the blitz chess championship of the Czech Republic she received a silver medal in 2013 and two bronze medals in 2003 and in 2006. The medalist of many international chess tournaments, including won Novi Sad (1981), Halle (1983), Bydgoszcz (1985) and Prague (1986). In 1980, she was awarded the FIDE Woman International Master (WIM) title and received the FIDE Woman Grandmaster (WGM) title two years later.

Eliška Richtrová three times participated in the Women's World Chess Championship Interzonal Tournaments:

- In 1982, at Interzonal Tournament in Bad Kissingen shared 4th-5th place;
- In 1987, at Interzonal Tournament in Smederevska Palanka shared 2nd-4th place, but ranked 3rd in Tbilisi playoff after Nona Gaprindashvili and Irina Levitina;
- In 1990, at Interzonal Tournament in Azov ranked 3rd place.

In 1990, she participated at Candidates Tournament in Borjomi and stayed in the last, 8th place.

Eliška Richtrová played for Czechoslovakia and Czech Republic in the Women's Chess Olympiads:

- In 1988, at first board in the 28th Chess Olympiad (women) in Thessaloniki (+3, =6, -5),
- In 1990, at first board in the 29th Chess Olympiad (women) in Novi Sad (+5, =6, -2),
- In 1992, at first board in the 30th Chess Olympiad (women) in Manila (+5, =6, -3),
- In 2008, at fourth board in the 38th Chess Olympiad (women) in Dresden (+4, =2, -4).

In 1984 she graduated from the University of Economics (Prague) as an engineer. In 1989 she graduated from the Charles University as a chess trainer. Since 1993 she works as an accountant and tax adviser. Since 2014, she is a member of the municipality of České Budějovice. Since November 2015 member of the Financial Commission of České Budějovice. From December 2014 to November 2015, she was a member the supervisory board of České Budějovice, supervising the forest and ponds. Since February 2016 she is on the supervisory board of the transport enterprise České Budějovice.
