= Carola von der Weth =

German chess player (born 1959)

Personal information
- Born: 19 June 1959 (age 67) Suhl, Germany

Chess career
- Country: Germany
- Title: Woman FIDE Master (1990)
- Peak rating: 2110 (January 1989)

Carola von der Weth (née Manger; born 19 June 1959) is a German chess Woman FIDE Master who won East Germany Women's Chess Championship (1986).

== Life ==
Carola von der Weth completed an apprenticeship as a graduate engineer for urban planning and works in the Construction and Urban Development Office of the City of Suhl. Her hobbies were chess and correspondence chess. In 1976 she took part in an East Germany Women's Chess Championship for the first time. In 1983 she won East Germany Women's Correspondence Chess Championship and in 1986 she won the 35th East Germany Women's Chess Championship.

== Chess career ==
=== Individual Championships ===
As Carola Manger, she took part in the East Germany Women's Chess Championships in 1976 in Gröditz, 1979 in Suhl, 1982 in Salzwedel, 1983 in Cottbus, 1984 in Eilenburg and 1986 in Nordhausen. In Nordhausen she was first with a lead of half a point in front of Iris Bröder, Annett Wagner-Michel and Antje Riedel who had the same number of points.

=== Team Championships ===
She played first board in the men's district league to train for women's championships.

In the Chess Women's Bundesliga she was selected in the seasons 1991/92 and 1992/93 for the team by Motor Weimar or the SV Weimar, but was not participated in tournament.

=== Other ===
She holds the title of Woman FIDE Master (WFM).

Her highest rating was an Elo rating of 2110 points in January 1989. Since then, her Elo rating hasn't changed since she hasn't played a rated game.

=== Correspondence Chess ===
In 1983 she won the East Germany Women's Correspondence Chess Championship and played in the semi-finals of the 5th Women's World Correspondence Chess Championship.

She participated in the final of the 16th German Women's Correspondence Chess Championship in 1994/96, which Anke Koglin won.
