= Women's World Chess Championship 1991 =

The 1991 Women's World Chess Championship was won by Xie Jun, who defeated the incumbent champion Maia Chiburdanidze in the title match.

== 1990 Interzonals ==
As part of the qualification process, two Interzonal tournaments were held in the summer of 1990, one in Azov in June and the other in the Genting Highlands in Malaysia in June and July, featuring the best players from each FIDE zone. A total of 36 players took part, with the top three from each Interzonal qualifying for the Candidates Tournament.

Kachiani and Galliamova shared first place in Azov, half a point ahead of Klimova-Richtrova, who also advanced to the Candidates.

In Genting, ex-champion Gaprindashvili scored an impressive victory at the age of 49, one point ahead of the almost 30 years younger surprise star Xie, while Marić took the last spot in the Candidates after winning a playoff against Gurieli 3-2.

1990 Women's Interzonal, Azov
	Player	Rating	1	2	3	4	5	6	7	8	9	10	11	12	13	14	15	16	17	18	Points	Tie break
1	Ketino Kachiani (Soviet Union)	2365	-	½	½	0	½	1	½	½	1	½	½	1	1	½	1	½	1	1	11½	89.50
2	Alisa Galliamova (Soviet Union)	2365	½	-	½	1	1	1	½	0	0	0	1	1	1	1	0	1	1	1	11½	89.25
3	Eliska Klimova-Richtrova (Czechoslovakia)	2355	½	½	-	1	0	1	0	1	1	½	1	½	½	½	1	0	1	1	11	
4	Svetlana Prudnikova (Soviet Union)	2265	1	0	0	-	1	1	0	1	½	1	½	0	½	1	0	1	1	1	10½	
5	Claudia Amura (Argentina)	2285	½	0	1	0	-	½	1	1	0	½	1	½	1	½	½	0	1	1	10	79.75
6	Ketevan Arakhamia (Soviet Union)	2385	0	0	0	0	½	-	1	1	1	1	0	1	1	0	1	½	1	1	10	74.75
7	Peng Zhaoqin (China)	2305	½	½	1	1	0	0	-	½	0	0	0	1	½	1	1	1	1	1	10	74.50
8	Agnieszka Brustman (Poland)	2325	½	1	0	0	0	0	½	-	1	1	0	1	½	½	1	1	1	1	10	74.00
9	Ildikó Mádl (Hungary)	2405	0	1	0	½	1	0	1	0	-	½	1	0	½	½	1	1	½	1	9½	72.72
10	Fliura Uskova (Soviet Union)	2270	½	1	½	0	½	0	1	0	½	-	½	0	½	½	1	1	1	1	9½	70.75
11	Irina Chelushkina (Soviet Union)	2315	½	0	0	½	0	1	1	1	0	½	-	1	0	1	½	1	0	1	9	71.75
12	Anna-Maria Botsari (Greece)	2205	0	0	½	1	½	0	0	0	1	1	0	-	0	1	1	1	1	1	9	63.50
13	Margarita Voiska (Bulgaria)	2335	0	0	½	½	0	0	½	½	½	½	1	1	-	0	1	0	1	1	8	
14	Vesna Basagić (Yugoslavia)	2270	½	0	½	0	½	1	0	½	½	½	0	0	1	-	0	1	½	1	7½	
15	Tsagaan Battsetseg (Mongolia)	2230	0	1	0	1	½	0	0	0	0	0	½	0	0	1	-	1	1	1	7	
16	Gina Finegold (Belgium)	2025	½	0	1	0	1	½	0	0	0	0	0	0	1	0	0	-	0	½	4½	
17	Adriana Salazar Varón (Colombia)	2115	0	0	0	0	0	0	0	0	½	0	1	0	0	½	0	1	-	0	3	
18	Sharon Ellen Burtman (USA)	2045	0	0	0	0	0	0	0	0	0	0	0	0	0	0	0	½	1	-	1½	

1990 Women's Interzonal, Genting Highlands
	Player	1	2	3	4	5	6	7	8	9	10	11	12	13	14	15	16	17	18	Points	Tie break
1	Nona Gaprindashvili (Soviet Union)	-	1	½	½	0	1	1	1	1	1	½	1	0	1	1	1	1	1	13½	
2	Xie Jun (China)	0	-	½	½	½	1	0	1	0	1	1	1	1	1	1	1	1	1	12½	
3	Alisa Marić (Yugoslavia)	½	½	-	½	½	1	½	1	1	0	½	1	1	1	½	1	½	1	12	93.25
4	Nino Gurieli (Soviet Union)	½	½	½	-	1	½	½	1	½	½	1	½	½	1	½	1	1	1	12	92.50
5	Julia Demina (Soviet Union)	1	½	½	0	-	½	0	½	1	1	½	1	½	1	1	½	½	1	11	85.75
6	Anna Akhsharumova (USA)	0	0	0	½	½	-	0	1	½	1	1	1	1	½	1	1	1	1	11	74.25
7	Marta Litinskaya-Shul (Soviet Union)	0	1	½	½	1	1	-	0	0	½	1	1	½	1	1	½	0	1	10½	
8	Elena Zayac (Soviet Union)	0	0	0	0	½	0	1	-	1	1	1	½	1	½	1	1	½	1	10	
9	Nina Høiberg (Denmark)	0	1	0	½	0	½	1	0	-	0	1	1	½	½	1	½	1	1	9½	67.50
10	Nana Alexandria (Soviet Union)	0	0	1	½	0	0	½	0	1	-	0	½	1	1	1	1	1	1	9½	63.50
11	Tatjana Lematschko (Switzerland)	½	0	½	0	½	0	0	0	0	1	-	0	1	1	½	1	1	½	7½	
12	Erika Sziva (Netherlands)	0	0	0	½	0	0	0	½	0	½	1	-	½	½	½	½	1	1	6½	
13	Marina Makropoulou (Greece)	1	0	0	½	½	0	½	0	½	0	0	½	-	0	½	0	1	1	6	45.75
14	Cathy Forbes (England)	0	0	0	0	0	½	0	½	½	0	0	½	1	-	½	1	½	1	6	35.25
15	Nava Starr (Canada)	0	0	½	½	0	0	0	0	0	0	½	½	½	½	-	1	1	1	6	34.50
16	Annett Wagner-Michel (East Germany)	0	0	0	0	½	0	½	0	½	0	0	½	1	0	0	-	1	1	5	
17	Ingrid Dahl (Norway)	0	0	½	0	½	0	1	½	0	0	0	0	0	½	0	0	-	½	3½	
18	Alexey Root (USA)	0	0	0	0	0	0	0	0	0	0	½	0	0	0	0	0	½	-	1	

== 1990 Candidates Tournament ==
The six qualifiers from the Interzonals were joined by the top two from the previous Candidates: Ioseliani and Akhmilovskaya.

Like the previous two cycles, the Candidates Tournament in this cycle was contested as a round-robin tournament in Borzomi in October 1990. Somewhat unexpectedly, the two 20-year-olds Xie and Marić tied for first place. Xie won the playoff in Belgrade and Beijing in February 1991 by 4½-2½, earning the right to challenge the reigning champion for the title.

1990 Women's Candidates Tournament
	Player	1	2	3	4	5	6	7	8	Points	Tie break
1	Xie Jun (China)	-	1	0	1	1	1	0	½	4½	16.00
2	Alisa Marić (Yugoslavia)	0	-	1	½	1	½	1	½	4½	14.50
3	Alisa Galliamova (Soviet Union)	1	0	-	0	1	1	½	½	4	13.25
4	Nana Ioseliani (Soviet Union)	0	½	1	-	½	½	½	1	4	12.75
5	Nona Gaprindashvili (Soviet Union)	0	0	0	½	-	1	1	1	3½	
6	Elena Donaldson-Akhmilovskaya (United States)	0	½	0	½	0	-	1	1	3	
7	Ketino Kachiani (Soviet Union)	1	0	½	½	0	0	-	½	2½	
8	Eliska Klimova-Richtrova (Czechoslovakia)	½	½	½	0	0	0	½	-	2	

== 1991 Championship Match ==
The championship match was played in Manila in 1991. In a result that came as a surprise to most of the chess world, the relatively unknown Chinese challenger Xie won 4 games (against 2) and the match, ending Chiburdanidze's 13-year reign as world champion.

Women's World Championship Match 1991
	1	2	3	4	5	6	7	8	9	10	11	12	13	14	15	Total
Xie Jun (China)	½	½	1	0	0	½	½	1	½	½	1	½	1	½	½	8½
Maia Chiburdanidze (Soviet Union)	½	½	0	1	1	½	½	0	½	½	0	½	0	½	½	6½
