= Ingrid Dahl =

Norwegian chess player (born 1964)

Personal information
- Born: 26 March 1964 (age 62)

Chess career
- Country: Norway
- Title: Woman International Master (1990)
- Peak rating: 2130 (July 1991)

Ingrid Dahl (born 26 March 1964) is a Norwegian chess player who holds the FIDE title of Woman International Master (WIM, 1990).

== Biography ==
In 1987, in Słupsk, Dahl won the Nordic Chess Cup with the Norwegian team. In 1990, she participated in the Women's World Chess Championship Interzonal Tournament in Genting Highlands where she ranked 17th place.

Dahl played for Norway in the Women's Chess Olympiads:

- In 1982, at second board in the 10th Chess Olympiad (women) in Lucerne (+2, =5, -2),
- In 1984, at first board in the 26th Chess Olympiad (women) in Thessaloniki (+3, =4, -3),
- In 1988, at first board in the 28th Chess Olympiad (women) in Thessaloniki (+6, =5, -2),
- In 1990, at first board in the 29th Chess Olympiad (women) in Novi Sad (+3, =7, -4),
- In 1992, at first board in the 30th Chess Olympiad (women) in Manila (+2, =5, -5),
- In 1994, at first board in the 31st Chess Olympiad (women) in Moscow (+6, =5, -2).

She played for Norway in the European Team Chess Championship:

- In 1992, at first board in the 1st European Team Chess Championship (women) in Debrecen (+0, =7, -2).

In 1990, Dahl was awarded the FIDE Woman International Master (WIM) title. She was the first Norwegian chess player who receive this title.

Since 1994 she rarely participates in chess tournaments.
