= Teresa Canela Giménez =

Spanish chess player (born 1959)

Personal information
- Born: 4 March 1959 (age 67)

Chess career
- Country: Spain
- Title: Woman International Master (1987)
- Peak rating: 2165 (January 1988)

Teresa Canela Giménez (born 4 March 1959) is a Spanish chess player who holds the FIDE title of Woman International Master (WIM, 1987).

== Biography ==
Canela has won the Catalonia Women's Chess Championships six times (in 1975, 1976, 1978, 1982, 1983, 1985) and took second place four times. In 1987, in Tuzla Teresa Canela Giménez participated in the Women's World Chess Championship Interzonal Tournament where she finished in 16th place.

Canela played for Spain in a number of Women's Chess Olympiads:

- In 1976, at third board in the 7th Chess Olympiad (women) in Haifa (+3, =4, -3) and won the team bronze medal,
- In 1984, at third board in the 26th Chess Olympiad (women) in Thessaloniki (+5, =2, -3),
- In 1986, at third board in the 27th Chess Olympiad (women) in Dubai (+5, =2, -3),
- In 1988, at second board in the 28th Chess Olympiad (women) in Thessaloniki (+2, =1, -8),
- In 1990, at third board in the 29th Chess Olympiad (women) in Novi Sad (+6, =2, -3).

In 1987, she was awarded the FIDE Woman International Master (WIM) title.
