= Gulnar Sachs =

English chess player (born 1963)

Gulnara Sachs
Personal information
- Born: Gulnara Bayakhmetovna Sakhatova; 24 April 1963 (age 63) Alma-Ata, Kazakh SSR, Soviet Union

Chess career
- Country: Soviet Union; Kazakhstan; England
- Title: Woman International Master (1986)
- Peak rating: 2365 (January 1992)

Gulnara Sachs (née Gulnara Bayakhmetovna Sakhatova, Russian: Гульнара Баяхметовна Сахатова, born 24 April 1963) is a Kazakhstan-born English chess player. She received the FIDE title of Woman International Master (WIM) in 1985.

== Biography ==
She is the older sister of WGM Elvira Berend (née Sakhatova). From 1984 to 1989, Sachs participated six times in the USSR Women's Chess Championship finals, with the best result in 1985, when she ranked 5th place. In 1986, she won the Soviet Armed Forces Women's Chess Championship. In the same year she won the international women's chess tournament in Tallinn, ahead of the leading Estonian chess players Tatyana Fomina and Maaja Ranniku. In 1985, she was awarded the FIDE Woman International Master (WIM) title.

Sachs two times participated in the Women's World Chess Championship Interzonal Tournaments:

- In 1985, at Interzonal Tournament in Havana shared 6th-7th place with Zsuzsa Verőci;
- In 1987, at Interzonal Tournament in Tuzla ranked 5th place.

Sachs played for Kazakhstan in the Women's Chess Olympiad:

- In 1992, at second board in the 30th Chess Olympiad (women) in Manila (+3, =2, -6),

Due to family reasons, she has left her chess player's career.
