= Stepanka Mayer =

Czech-German chess player (born 1949)

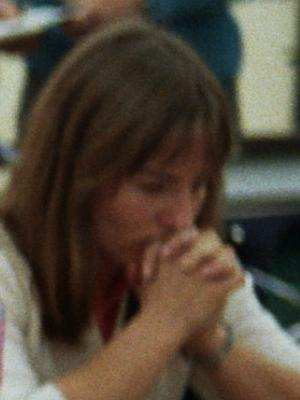
- Mayer in 1984

Personal information
- Born: 8 July 1949 (age 77)

Chess career
- Country: Czechoslovakia; West Germany; Germany
- Title: Woman International Master (1970)
- Peak rating: 2230 (July 1982)

Stepanka Mayer (née Štěpánka Vokřálová; born 8 July 1949), is a Czech and German chess player who holds the title of Woman International Master (WIM, 1970). She is a five-time winner of the Czechoslovak Women's Chess Championship (1968, 1970, 1972, 1977, 1978).

== Biography ==
From the end of the 1960s to the end of the 1970s, she was one of the leading Czechoslovak women's chess players. She has won medals in the Czech women's chess championships six times: five gold (1968, 1970, 1972, 1977, 1978) and silver (1975). The medalist of many international women's chess tournaments, including three-time 2nd place in Wijk aan Zee (1969, 1970, 1971). In 1970, she was awarded the FIDE Woman International Master (WIM) title.

Stepanka Mayer played for Czechoslovakia and West Germany in the Women's Chess Olympiads:

- In 1969, at first board in the 4th Chess Olympiad (women) in Lublin (+4, =5, -0) and won the team bronze medal and the individual silver medal,
- In 1972, at first board in the 5th Chess Olympiad (women) in Skopje (+5, =5, -1),
- In 1974, at second board in the 6th Chess Olympiad (women) in Medellín (+6, =3, -2).
- In 1984, at third board in the 26th Chess Olympiad (women) in Thessaloniki (+5, =5, -1).

In 1978, she emigrated to Sweden, but later moved to West Germany, which one represented since 1982 in chess tournaments. In 1985, she participated in Women's World Chess Championship Interzonal Tournament in Havana, where stayed at last place. Soon after this, she stopped her active chess playing career.
