= Natalia Titorenko =

Russian chess player (born 1951)

Personal information
- Born: Natalia Ivanovna Titorenko; 16 January 1951 (age 75) Berdychiv, Ukraine

Chess career
- Country: Soviet Union; Russia
- Title: Woman International Master (1982)
- Peak rating: 2190 (January 1980)

Natalia Ivanovna Titorenko (Russian: Наталья Ивановна Титоренко; born 16 January 1951) is a Soviet and Russian chess player who hold the FIDE title of Woman International Master (1982).

== Biography ==
In the late 1960s and early 1970s Natalia Titorenko was one of the leading Soviet young chess players. In 1968 in Kaluga she won Soviet Girl's Chess Championship. She five times participated in USSR Women's Chess Championship finals (1971, 1975, 1978, 1981, 1982). The best result was shown in 1981 when she ranked in 5th place. In 1982, Natalia Titorenko participated at Interzonal Tournament in Tbilisi and shared 7th-8th place. In 1982, she was awarded the FIDE Woman International Master (WIM) title. Successfully played in several international women's chess tournaments: Moscow (1975) - won 2nd place; Halle (1983) - won 2nd place. In 1987, she won Moscow Women's Chess Championship. After education she is an engineer.
