= Christina Nyberg =

Swedish chess player

Personal information
- Born: 8 February 1962 (age 64)

Chess career
- Country: Sweden

Christina Nyberg (born 8 February 1962), is a Swedish chess player.

== Biography ==
In 1980s, Christina Nyberg was one of the leading Swedish chess players. In 1987, she won second place behind Nina Høiberg in Women's World Chess Championship Zonal Tournament. In 1987, she participated in the Women's World Chess Championship Interzonal Tournament in Smederevska Palanka and ranked 16th place.

Christina Nyberg played for Sweden in the Women's Chess Olympiads:

- In 1980, at third board in the 9th Chess Olympiad (women) in Valletta (+6, =2, -3),
- In 1982, at first reserve board in the 10th Chess Olympiad (women) in Lucerne (+0, =1, -4),
- In 1990, at third board in the 29th Chess Olympiad (women) in Novi Sad (+2, =3, -5),
- In 1998, at first reserve board in the 33rd Chess Olympiad (women) in Elista (+3, =2, -3).

In 1987, she won third place in the Nordic Chess Cup with the Swedish team.
