= Bettina Trabert =

German chess player (born 1969)

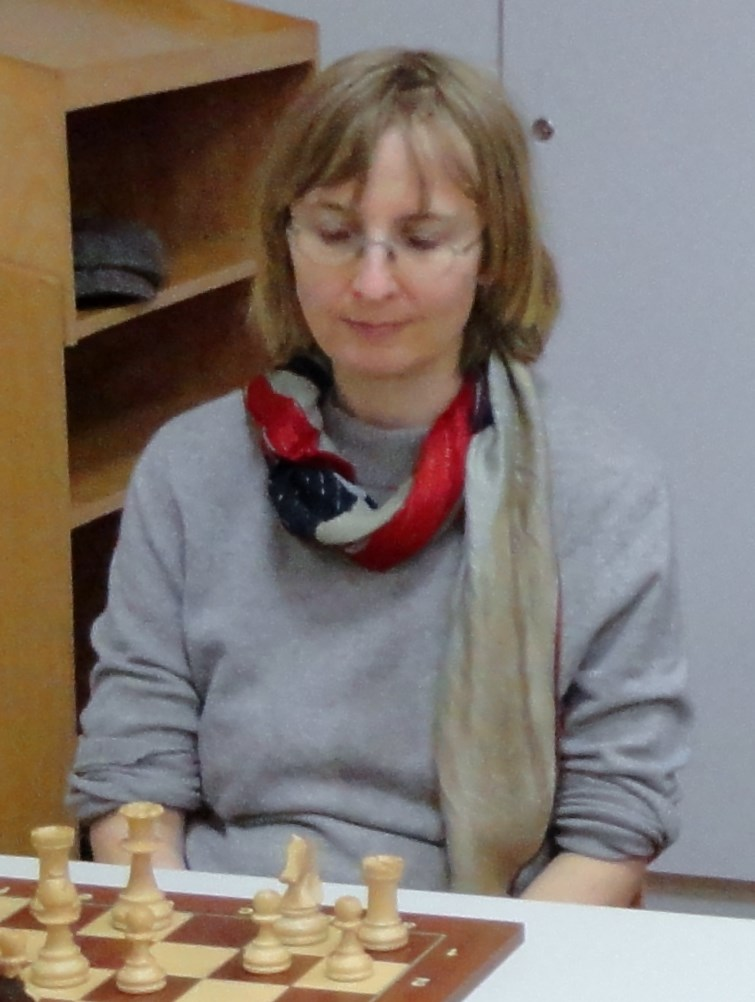
- Trabert in 2013

Personal information
- Born: 4 March 1969 (age 57) Ottawa, Ontario, Canada

Chess career
- Country: Germany
- Title: Woman Grandmaster (2000)
- Peak rating: 2357 (January 2005)

Bettina Trabert (born 4 March 1969) is a German chess player who holds the FIDE title of Woman Grandmaster (WGM, 2000).

== Biography ==
Trabert started playing chess at the age of eight. In 1983, at the age of fourteen, she won second place in the German Junior Chess Championship in the U20 girls' group.

In 1987, in Erlangen, Trabert won Women's World Chess Championship Zonal Tournament. In 1987, she participated in the Women's World Chess Championship Interzonal Tournament in Tuzla and shared 13th-14th place with Rohini Khadilkar.

Trabert played for Germany in the Women's Chess Olympiads:

- In 1986, at third board in the 27th Chess Olympiad (women) in Dubai (+2, =6, -2),
- In 1988, at third board in the 28th Chess Olympiad (women) in Thessaloniki (+3, =2, -2),
- In 1990, at third board in the 29th Chess Olympiad (women) in Novi Sad (+4, =4, -3),
- In 1996, at first reserve board in the 32nd Chess Olympiad (women) in Yerevan (+4, =5, -1),
- In 2000, at first reserve board in the 34th Chess Olympiad (women) in Istanbul (+1, =2, -3).

She played for Germany in the European Team Chess Championships:

- In 1997, at first reserve board in the 2nd European Team Chess Championship (women) in Pula (+2, =0, -2),
- In 2005, at fourth board in the 6th European Team Chess Championship (women) in Gothenburg (+1, =4, -1).

In 1987, Trabert was awarded the FIDE Woman International Master (WIM) title and received the FIDE Woman Grandmaster (WGM) title in 2000.
