= Tamara Minogina =

Russian chess player (born 1959)

Personal information
- Born: Tamara Ivanovna Minogina; 12 February 1959 (age 67) Orsk, Russia

Chess career
- Country: Soviet Union; Russia
- Title: Woman International Master (1982)
- Peak rating: 2274 (October 2004)

Tamara Ivanovna Minogina (Russian: Тамара Ивановна Миногина; born 12 February 1959) is a Soviet and Russian chess player who hold the FIDE title of Woman International Master (1982).

== Biography ==
In the late 1970s and early 1980s Tamara Minogina was one of the leading Soviet young chess players. In 1977 in Riga she won Soviet Girl's Chess Championship. She five times in a row participated in USSR Women's Chess Championship finals (1978, 1979, 1980, 1981, 1982). The best result was shown in 1981 when she shared 6th-8th place. Minogina participated of the FIDE Zonal tournaments of 1981 and 1985, and her best result in 1981 when she shared 1st-4th places. In 1982, Minogina participated at Interzonal Tournament in Tbilisi and shared 7th-8th place. In 1982, she was awarded the FIDE Woman International Master (WIM) title. Successfully played in several international women's chess tournaments: Budapest (1982) - won 2nd place; Halle (1984) - shared 2nd-3rd place; Tashkent (1986) - won 3rd place.

In 1981 Minogina has graduated from the State Central Order of Lenin Institute of Physical Education (now Russian State University of Physical Education, Sport, Youth and Tourism) and works as a chess trainer in Moscow and Moscow Oblast.
