= Inna Koren =

Azerbaijani-born American chess player

Personal information
- Born: Inna Izrailov; 30 March 1964 (age 62) Baku, Azerbaijani SSR, Soviet Union

Chess career
- Country: United States (since 1979); Soviet Union (before 1979)
- Title: Woman International Master (1986)
- Peak rating: 2210 (July 1989)

Inna Koren (née Izrailov, born 30 March 1964) is an Azerbaijani-born American chess player who holds the FIDE title of Woman International Master (WIM, 1986). She was also a former United States Women's Chess Championship titleholder.

== Biography ==
Since 1979, Koren has been living in the United States. In 1986, she won the United States Women's Chess Championship and was awarded the FIDE Woman International Master (WIM) title that year. In 1987, Koren participated in the Women's World Chess Championship Interzonal Tournament in Smederevska Palanka sharing 6th-7th place with Ildikó Mádl.

She played for the United States in two Women's Chess Olympiads:

- In 1984, on second board in the 26th Chess Olympiad (women) in Thessaloniki (+3, =2, -4),
- In 1988, on third board in the 28th Chess Olympiad (women) in Thessaloniki (+3, =5, -2).

Koren graduated from Yale University with a degree in Computer Science. While at Yale, she played for the winning team at the Pan American Intercollegiate Team Championship. The winning 1983 team from Yale University featured three future US Chess Champions in Joel Benjamin, Michael Wilder, and Inna Izrailov (Koren).

She started her career in mortgage finance at Goldman Sachs, followed by 11 years at Prudential Financial, Inc. as a Senior Vice President in MBS/ABS Research. From 2001 to 2003, she was with Wachovia Securities running their ABS Consumer Research. In 2003, she joined Barclays Capital PLC as a Director and Senior Home Equity/ABS Analyst.
