= Lidia Semenova =

Ukrainian chess player (1951–2025)

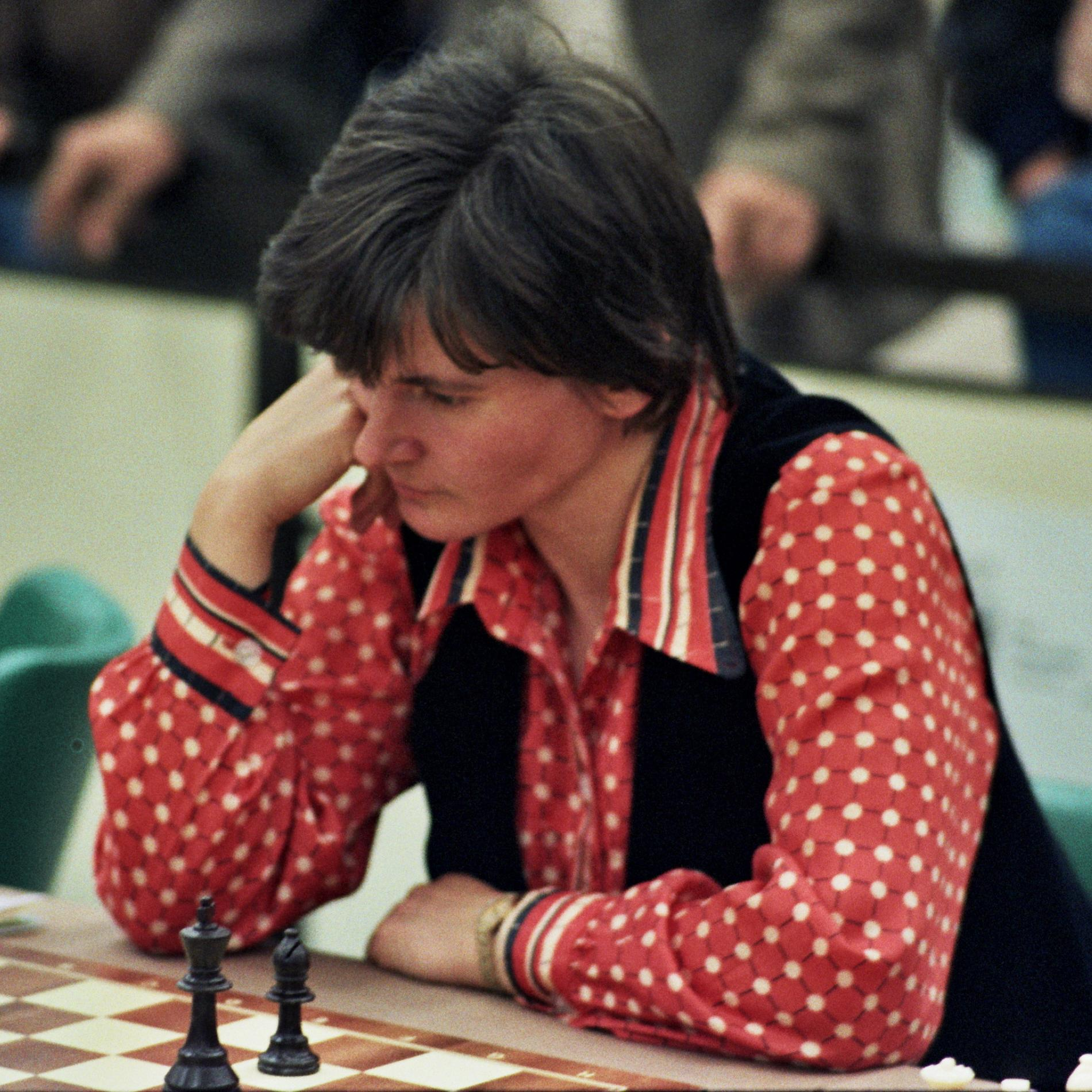
- Semenova in 1984

Personal information
- Native name: Лідія Семенова
- Born: Lidia Kostiantynivna Semenova; November 22, 1951 Kyiv, Ukrainian SSR, USSR
- Died: July 4, 2025 (aged 73)

Chess career
- Country: Soviet Union → Ukraine
- Title: Woman Grandmaster (1982)
- Peak rating: 2350 (July 1990)

Lidia Kostiantynivna Semenova (Ukrainian: Лідія Костянтинівна Семенова; November 22, 1951 – July 4, 2025) was a Ukrainian chess player, who held the title of woman grandmaster.

== Biography ==
In 1978, Semenova won Women's Soviet Chess Championship. In 1981, she tied for 1st–4th in Leningrad (zonal). In 1982, she took 2nd in Bad Kissingen (interzonal; Nona Gaprindashvili won). In 1983, she beat Margareta Muresan 5½–4½ in Bad Kissingen (quarter-final match), and beat Nana Ioseliani 5½–4½ in Sochi (semi-final match). In 1984, Semenova lost in her bid for the Women's World Championship to Irina Levitina 5–7 in Sochi (final match).

Semenova won three gold medals at the Women's Chess Olympiad in Thessaloniki 1984 (team, individual on board four and rating performance).

In 1986, she tied for 4th–5th places in the Women's Candidates Tournament in Malmö, won by Elena Akhmilovskaya. In 1987, she tied for 3rd–4th in Tuzla (interzonal; Nana Ioseliani won), and lost a play-off match to Agnieszka Brustman 1–4. She tied for 12–18th at Jakarta 1993 (interzonal; Ketevan Arakhamia won), and 10–16th at Kishinev 1995 (interzonal; Arakhamia won).

Semenova was awarded the Woman Grandmaster title by FIDE in 1982.

Semenova died on July 4, 2025, at the age of 73.
