= Iris Mai =

German chess player (born 1962)

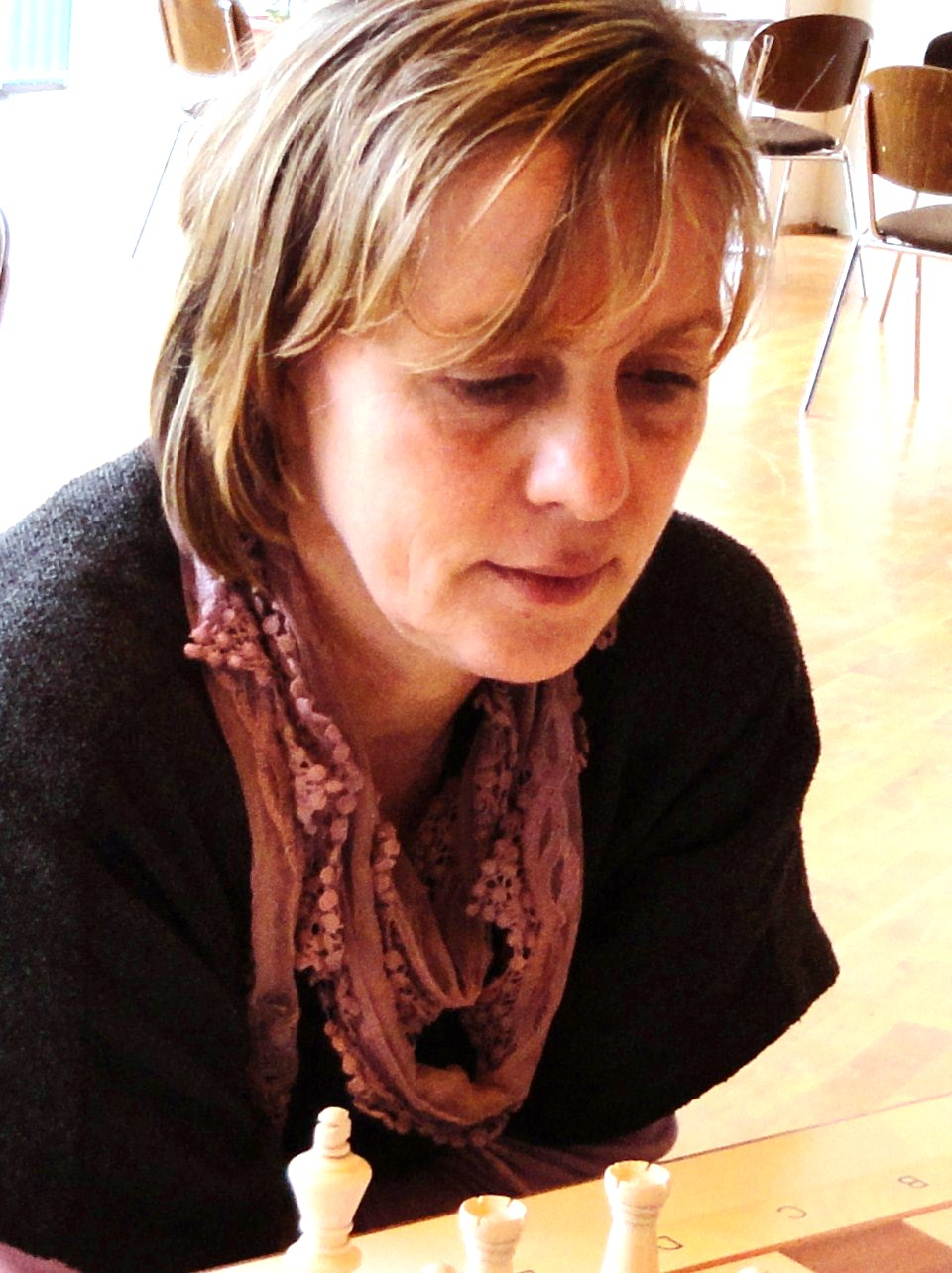
- Iris Mai in 2012

Personal information
- Born: 17 September 1962 (age 63) Halle (Saale), Germany

Chess career
- Country: Germany
- Title: Woman International Master (1986)
- Peak rating: 2225 (January 1987)

Iris Mai (née Bröder; born 17 September 1962) is a German chess Woman International Master (1986) who three times won East Germany Women's Chess Championship (1982, 1984, 1987).

== Chess ==
Iris Bröder began her chess career in the BSG Buna Halle and, at the age of 15, took part in an East Germany Women's Chess Championship for the first time in 1978 in Torgelow. Petra Feustel won this championship.

She won East Germany Girl's Chess Championship in 1977 and 1980. Her trainer was Uwe Bönsch. Their game against men and recreational sports were important. In 1981 she achieved the sports badge in gold. She was also interested in good literature and music. In July 1986 she won the women's tournament in Nałęczów, Poland, and thus got her third Woman International Master norm. She then received the Woman International Master title from FIDE.

=== Individual Championships ===
After the East Germany Women's Chess Championship in 1978 she was 3rd in 1979 in Suhl and played (except 1985) in all East Germany Women's Chess Championships until 1989 in Zittau. She won the East Germany Women's Chess Championships in 1982 in Salzwedel, in 1984 in Eilenburg and in 1987 in Glauchau. She took second place three times: 1981 in Fürstenwalde and 1983 in Cottbus behind Annett Wagner-Michel and 1986 in Nordhausen behind Carola Manger.

In 1981 in Halle she finished second behind Brigitte Burchardt in the East Germany Women's Blitz Championship.

=== Team competition ===
In 1979 and 1981 she twice won the East Germany Women's Blitz Team Championship with the BSG Buna Halle-Neustadt chess club.

In the first German Women's Chess Bundesliga she played from 1991 to 1998 for the USV Halle (until 1993 VdS Buna Halle), where she played in the Chess Bundesliga season 1991/92 was also registered as a reserve player in the 1st Bundesliga, but was not used. From 1998 to 2004 she played for SSV Rotation Berlin (except in the 2000/01 season also in the 1st Women's Chess Bundesliga), since 2004 she has been playing for Rotation Pankow, a spin-off from SSV Rotation Berlin, who played in the 1st Women's Chess Bundesliga from 2004 to 2007 and in the 2008/09 and 2011/12 seasons.

=== Other ===
Since the East Germany Women's Chess Championship in 1989 she has been playing under the name Iris Mai.
