= Zoya Schleining =

German chess player (born 1961)

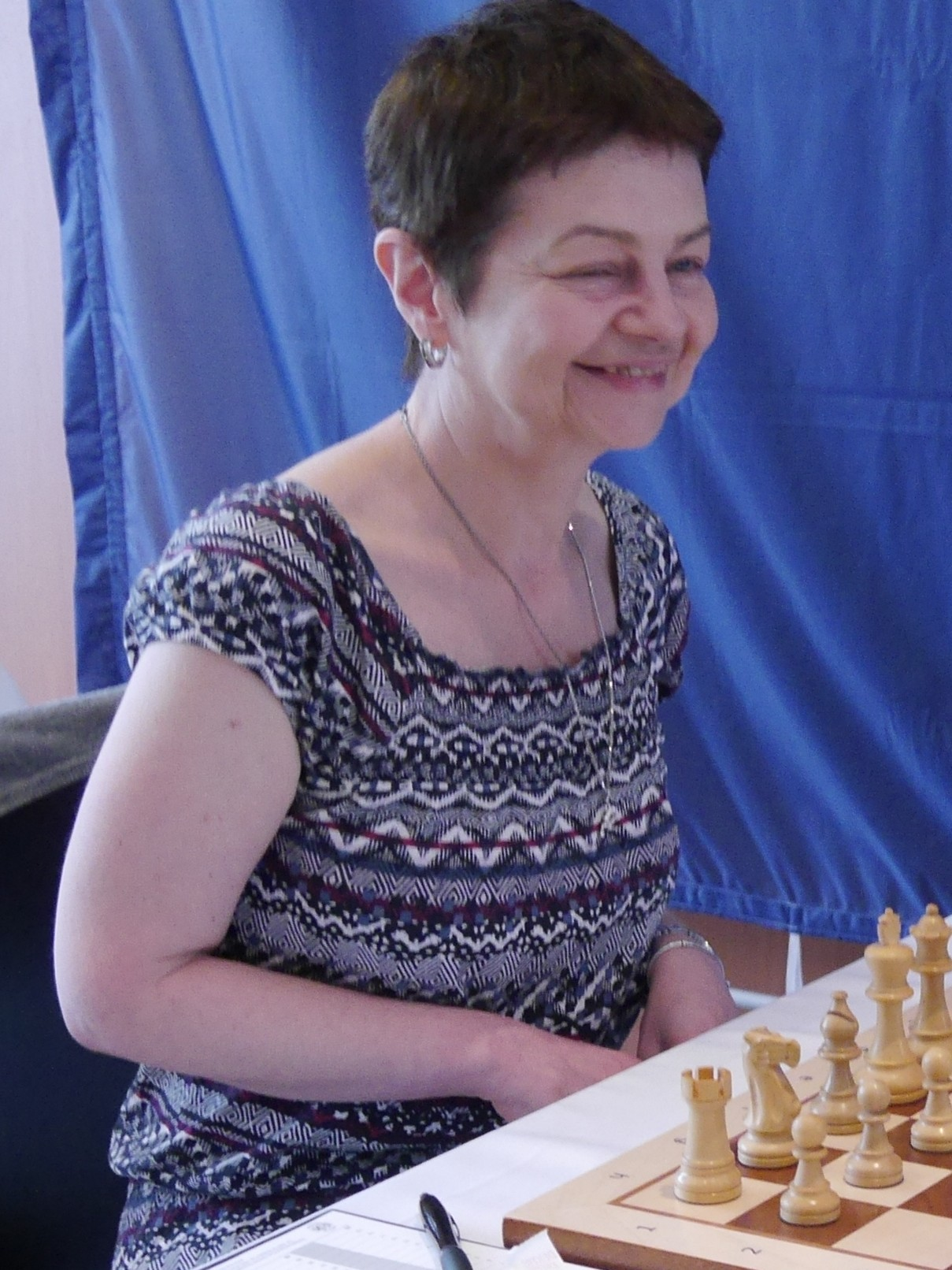
- Schleining in 2016

Personal information
- Born: 6 September 1961 (age 64) Lviv, Ukrainian SSR, Soviet Union

Chess career
- Country: Soviet Union; Ukraine; Germany
- Title: International Master (2016); Woman Grandmaster (1985)
- Peak rating: 2411 (October 2000)

Zoya Schleining (née Lelchuk, born 6 September 1961), is a Ukraine-born German chess player who holds the title of International Master (IM, 2016).

== Biography ==
She participated six times in the USSR Women's Chess Championship finals (1981, 1982, 1986, 1987, 1988, 1989). The best result was achieved in 1986 when she shared the 4th-5th place. In 1984, in Tallinn she won the USSR Trade Union Women's Chess Championship. In 1986, she won Ukrainian Women's Chess Championship. In 1990, she won International Women's Chess tournaments in Dresden and Moscow. After dissolution of the Soviet Union from 1992 to 2000 she represented Ukraine, but since 2000 she represent Germany. In 1995 she won again in tournament in Dresden. In 2014, she won the German Women's Fast Chess Championship, but in 2015 in Bad Wiessee she was the best in German Women's Chess Championship.

Zoya Schleining two times participated in the Women's World Chess Championship Interzonal Tournaments:

- In 1987, at Interzonal Tournament in Smederevska Palanka ranked 5th;
- In 1993, at Interzonal Tournament in Jakarta shared 19th-25th place.

Zoya Schleining played for Germany in the Women's Chess Olympiads:

- In 2014, at second board in the 41st Chess Olympiad (women) in Tromsø (+2, =1, -3).

Zoya Schleining played for Germany in the European Team Chess Championships:

- In 2013, at second board in the 10th European Team Chess Championship (women) in Warsaw (+1, =3, -2),
- In 2015, at third board in the 11th European Team Chess Championship (women) in Reykjavík (+1, =3, -2).

In 1985, she was awarded the FIDE Woman International Master (WIM) title and received the FIDE Woman Grandmaster (WGM) title two years later. In 2016, she was awarded the FIDE International Master (IM) title.
