= Giovanna Arbunic Castro =

Chilean chess player (born 1964)

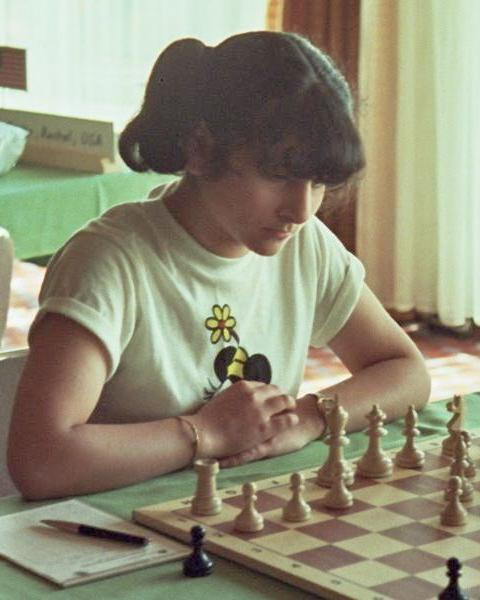
- Arbunic in 1982

Personal information
- Born: Giovanna Brunilda Arbunic Castro; 1 July 1964 (age 62) Punta Arenas, Chile

Chess career
- Country: Chile
- Title: Woman International Master (1982)
- Peak rating: 2185 (July 1987)

Giovanna Brunilda Arbunic Castro (born 1 July 1964) is a Chilean chess player who holds the FIDE title of Woman International Master (1982).

== Biography ==
In the 1980s Arbunic was one of the leading Chilean women's chess players. She comes from the Magallanes Region. She was trained in 1981 and 1982 by Chilean FIDE Master David Arturo Godoy Bugueño (1944-2007). For a long time, she lives near Valencia (Spain) and is married to the Chilean International Master Daniel Barría Zuñiga (born 1974). Couple have a son and they founded a chess school, the Academia Online Manuelito. She eight time won the Chilean Women's Chess Championship. In 1982, she was awarded the FIDE Woman International Master (WIM) title. She won women's zone tournaments in 1982 in Morón (Argentina), in 1985 in São Paulo and in 1999 in Villa Martelli (Argentina). Giovanna Arbunic Castro play in lower Spanish leagues for the chess club Ajedrez Ed Manila Estrellas.

Arbunic participated twice in the Women's World Chess Championship Interzonal Tournaments:

- In 1982, at Interzonal Tournament in Bad Kissingen shared 15th-16th place;
- In 1985, at Interzonal Tournament in Zheleznovodsk shared 10th-11th place.

Arbunic played for Chile in the Women's Chess Olympiads:

- In 2012, at first board in the 40th Chess Olympiad (women) in Istanbul (+2, =0, -4).
