= Nina Høiberg =

Danish chess player (born 1956)

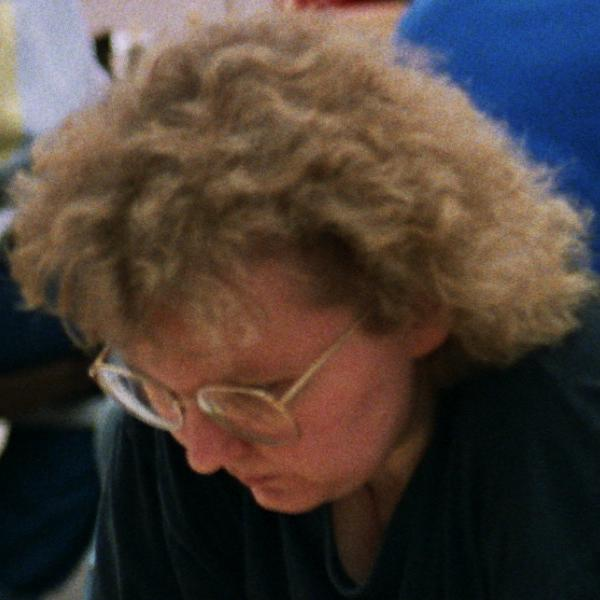
- Høiberg in 1988

Personal information
- Born: 17 February 1956 (age 70)

Chess career
- Country: Denmark
- Title: Woman International Master (1985)
- Peak rating: 2295 (July 1987)

Nina Høiberg (born 17 February 1956) is a Danish chess player and Woman International Master (WIM, 1985). She is an eight-times winner of the Danish Women's Chess Championship.

== Biography ==
From the mid 1970s to the early 1990s, Nina Høiberg was the leading female chess-player in Denmark. Eight times she won the Danish Women's Chess Championships: 1974, 1976, 1977, 1978, 1986, 1991, 1992, and 1993.

Nina Høiberg three times participated in the Women's World Chess Championship Interzonal Tournaments:

- In 1985, at Interzonal Tournament in Zheleznovodsk ranked 9th place;
- In 1987, at Interzonal Tournament in Tuzla shared 6th-7th place with Zsuzsa Verőci;
- In 1990, at Interzonal Tournament in Genting Highlands shared 9th-10th place with Nana Alexandria.

Nina Høiberg played for Denmark in the Women's Chess Olympiads:

- In 1976, at first board in the 7th Chess Olympiad (women) in Haifa (+3, =3, -6),
- In 1978, at first board in the 8th Chess Olympiad (women) in Buenos Aires (+7, =6, -1),
- In 1988, at first board in the 28th Chess Olympiad (women) in Thessaloniki (+7, =4, -3),
- In 1990, at first board in the 29th Chess Olympiad (women) in Novi Sad (+7, =6, -1),
- In 1994, at first board in the 31st Chess Olympiad (women) in Moscow (+7, =5, -2),
- In 2002, at first board in the 35th Chess Olympiad (women) in Bled (+2, =3, -4).

Nina Høiberg played for Denmark in the European Team Chess Championships:

- In 1992, at first board in the 1st European Team Chess Championship (women) in Debrecen (+3, =0, -5),
- In 2015, at first board in the 11th European Team Chess Championship (women) in Reykjavík (+2, =3, -3).

In 1985, she was awarded the FIDE Woman International Master (WIM) title.
