= Annett Wagner-Michel =

German chess player

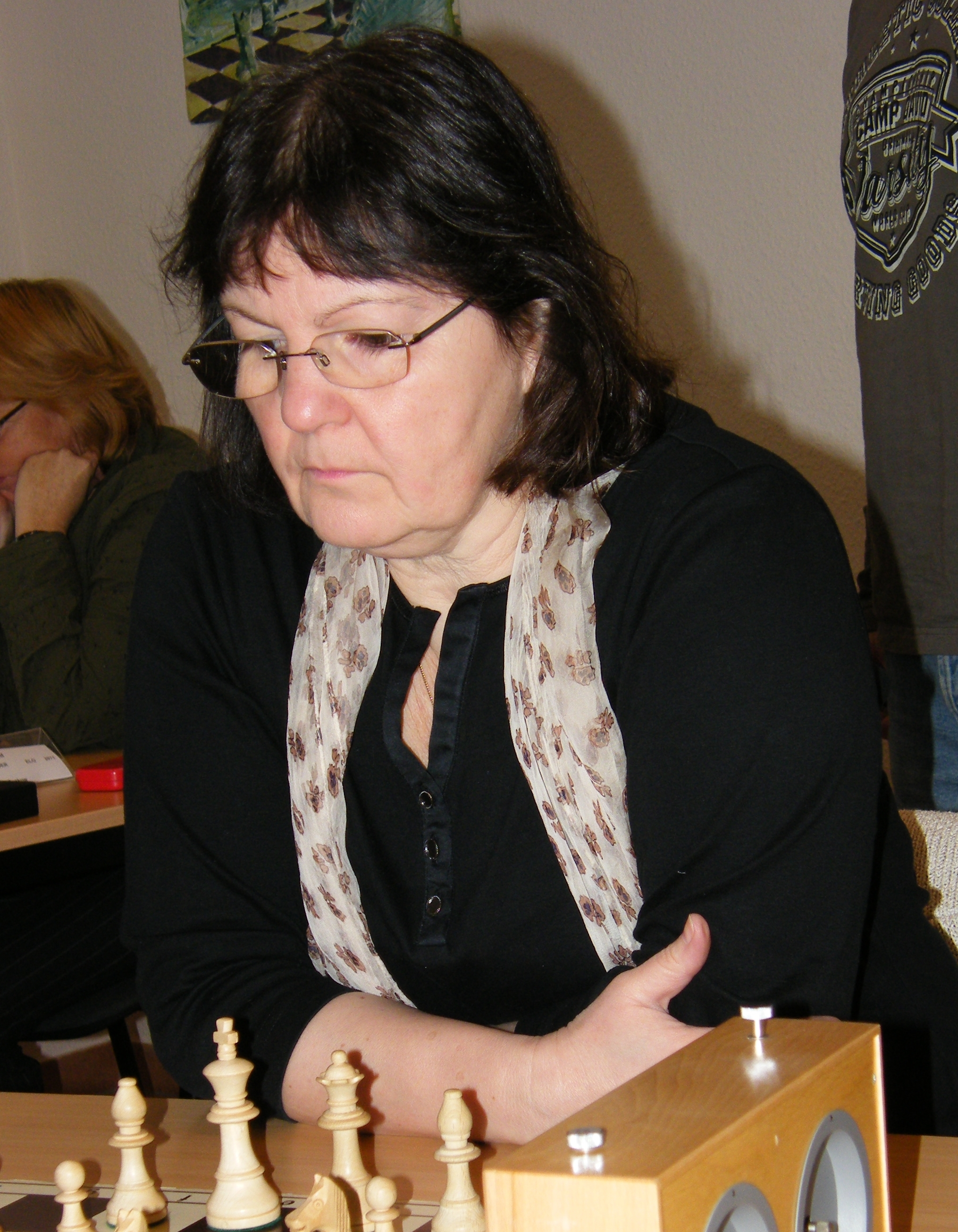
- Wagner-Michel in 2008

Personal information
- Born: 13 May 1955 (age 71) Halle, Germany

Chess career
- Country: East Germany; Germany
- Title: Woman International Master (1975)
- Peak rating: 2260 (January 1990)

Annett Wagner-Michel (née Michel, born 13 May 1955) is a German chess player who holds the FIDE title Woman International Master (WIM, 1975). She is a two-time East German Women's Chess Championship winner (1981, 1983).

== Biography ==
In 1972, she won the East Germany Girl's Youth Chess Championship in U14 age group. The end of the 1980s Wagner-Michel became one of the leading female chess players in East Germany. She twice won East German Women's Chess Championship (1981, 1983) as well as three times won silver medal in this tournament (1979, 1984, 1985). Also she twice won East Germany Women's Fast Chess Championships: in 1988 and in 1990.

In 1990, Wagner-Michel participated in Women's World Chess Championship Interzonal Tournament in Genting Highlands where ranked 16th place.

Wagner-Michel played for East Germany in the Women's Chess Olympiad:

- In 1990, at second board in the 29th Chess Olympiad (women) in Novi Sad (+3, =4, -4).

In 1975, she was awarded the FIDE Woman International Master (WIM) title.
