= Margareta Mureșan =

Romanian chess player

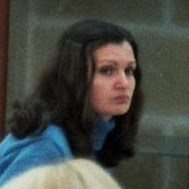
- Mureşan in 1980

Personal information
- Born: 13 March 1950 (age 76) Cluj-Napoca, Socialist Republic of Romania

Chess career
- Country: Romania
- Title: Woman Grandmaster (1982)
- Peak rating: 2310 (January 1987)

Margareta Mureşan (born 13 March 1950 in Cluj-Napoca) is a Romanian chess player, who was mainly active in the 1980s.

She has won the women's Romanian Chess Championship three times.

She played no. 1 board for the Romanian women's team which won the silver medal at the 25th Chess Olympiad and the bronze medal at the next 2 Olympiads.

She twice made it to the Interzonal stage of the Women's World Chess Championship and once in Candidates matches.
