= Irina Levitina =

Soviet and American chess and bridge player

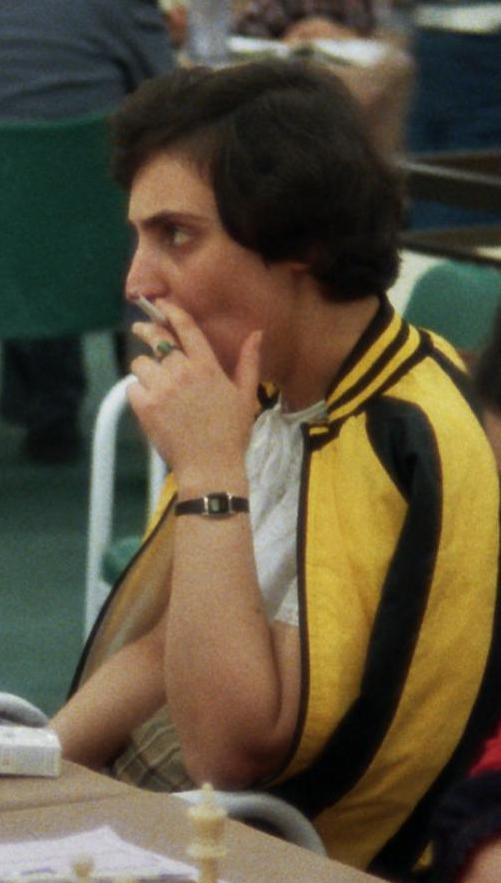
- Levitina during the 1984 Chess Olympiad

Personal information
- Born: Ирина Соломоновна Левитина; June 8, 1954 (age 72) Leningrad, Soviet Union

Chess career
- Country: United States (after 1991); Soviet Union (before 1991)
- Title: Woman Grandmaster (1976)
- FIDE rating: 2405 (November 2026)
- Peak rating: 2425 (July 1993)

Irina Solomonovna Levitina (Russian: Ирина Соломоновна Левитина; born June 8, 1954) is a former Soviet and current American chess and bridge player. In chess, she has been a World Championship Candidate in 1984 and gained the title Woman Grandmaster. In contract bridge she has won six world championship events, four women and two mixed, including play on two world-champion USA women teams.

== Chess career ==
In 1973, she tied for 2nd–5th in Menorca (interzonal). In 1974, she beat Valentina Kozlovskaya 6,5 : 5,5 in Kislovodsk (semifinal match). In 1975, she lost to Nana Alexandria 8 : 9 in a final match in Moscow. In 1977, she lost to Alla Kushnir 3 : 6 in a quarterfinal match in Dortmund.

In 1982, she took 2nd in Tbilisi (interzonal). In 1983, she beat Nona Gaprindashvili 6 : 4 in Lviv (quarterfinal), and Alexandria 7,5 : 6,5 in Dubna (semifinal). In 1984, she beat Lidia Semenova 7 : 5 in Sochi (final) and became World Women's Championship Challenger. Levitina lost to Maia Chiburdanidze 5½ : 8½ in a title match at Volgograd 1984.

In 1986, she took 7th in Malmö (Candidates Tournament; Elena Akhmilovskaya won). In 1987, she tied for 2nd–4th in Smederevska Palanka (interzonal). In 1988, she tied for 3rd–4th in Tsqaltubo (Candidates). In 1991, she tied for 3rd–4th in Subotica (interzonal). In 1992, she took 6th in Shanghai (Candidates; Susan Polgar won).

She was the Soviet Women's Champion four times—in 1971, 1978 (jointly), 1979, and 1981.

After her emigration in 1990 to the United States, she has also been U.S. Women's Champion in 1991 (jointly), 1992, and 1993 (jointly).

Awarded the titles of WIM in 1972, and WGM in 1976.

== Bridge career ==
Levitina is now a professional bridge player. She has won 5 world champion titles in women's bridge and many "national" titles (major events at North American Bridge Championships, thrice-annual 10-day meets). Sometime prior to the 2014 European and World meets (summer and October), Levitina ranked 15th among 73 Women World Grand Masters by world masterpoints (MP) and 5th by placing points that do not decay over time.

In 1986, Levitina won the Alpwater Award for the best played hand of the year by a woman player, becoming the first Soviet citizen to win a bridge award.

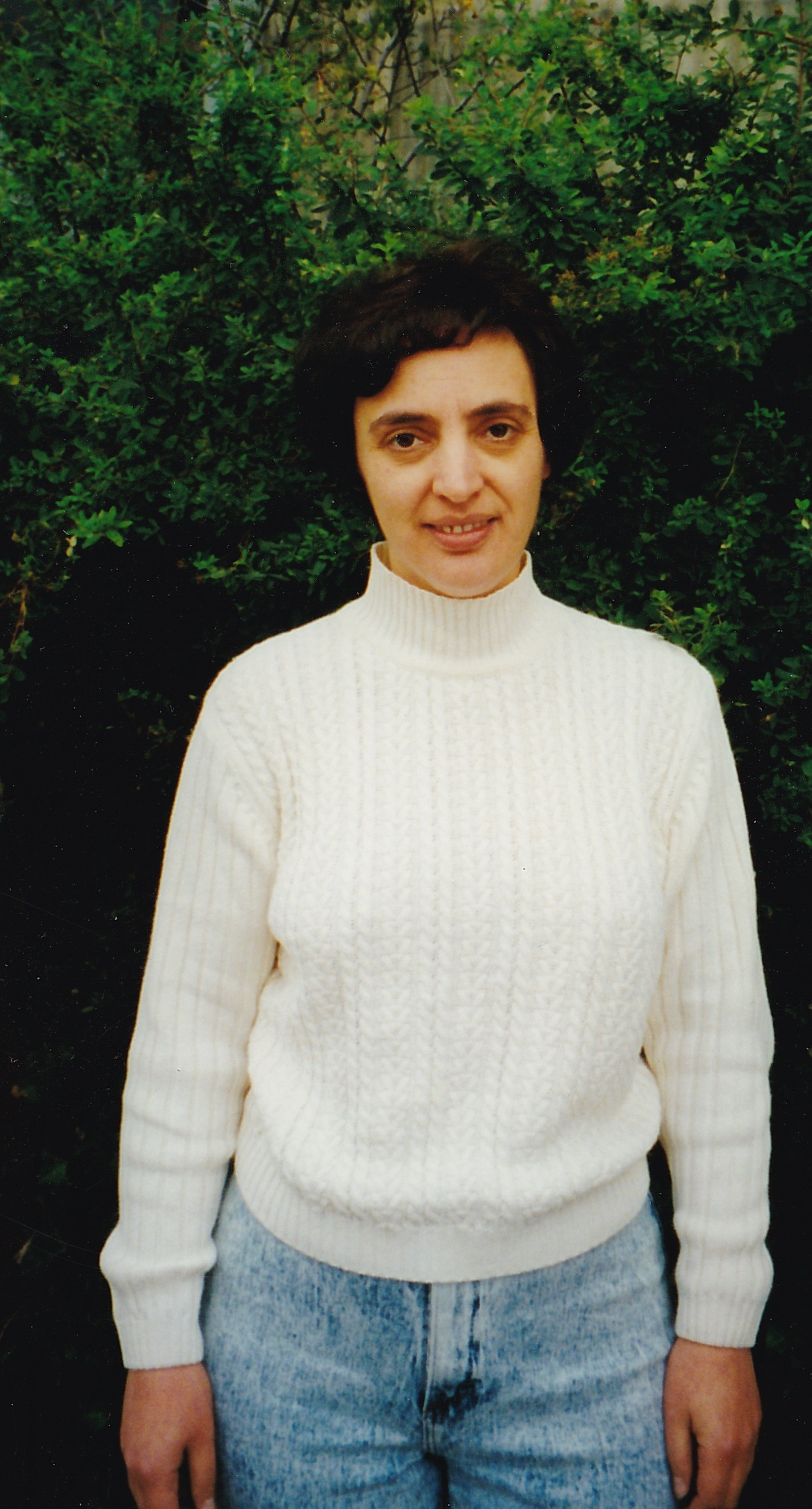
Irina Solomonovna Levitina at the 10th World Bridge Championships, Lille, France, 1998.

== Bridge accomplishments ==
=== Awards ===
- Alpwater Award 1986

=== Wins ===
- Venice Cup (1) 2007
- World Women Team Olympiad (1) 1996
- McConnell Cup (1) 2002
- World Women's Pairs (1) 2006
- Transnational Mixed Teams (1) 2000
- North American Bridge Championships (9)
  - Women's Swiss Teams (3) 2001, 2005, 2007
  - Women's Board-a-Match Teams (3) 2004, 2006, 2008
  - Women's Knockout Teams (3) 1993, 1995, 2008
- United States Bridge Championships (5)
  - Women's Team Trials (5) 1996, 2001, 2005, 2007, 2009

=== Runners-up ===
- McConnell Cup (1) 2006
- North American Bridge Championships (5)
  - North American Swiss Teams (1) 1995
  - Women's Swiss Teams (1) 2008
  - Women's Board-a-Match Teams (1) 2001
  - Women's Knockout Teams (2) 1998, 2004
- United States Bridge Championships (3)
  - Women's Team Trials (3) 2000, 2004, 2008

== Notable chess games ==
- Nana G Alexandria vs Irina Levitina, Moscow cf (Women) 1975, Sicilian Defense: Kan, Knight Variation (B43), 0-1
- Irina Levitina vs Goltsova, Sevastopol 1978, Sicilian Defense: Old Sicilian, General (B30), 1-0

== See also ==
- List of Jewish chess players

Preceded by Elena Donaldson	U.S. Women's Chess Champion; 1991 (with Esther Epstein), 1992, and 1993 (with Elena Donaldson)	Succeeded by Elena Donaldson
