= Litmanowicz =

Litmanowicz is a Polish surname. Notable people with the surname include:

- Mirosława Litmanowicz (1928–2017), Polish chess master, wife of Władysław
- Władysław Litmanowicz (1918–1992), Polish chess master
