= U.S. Women's Open Chess Championship =

The U.S. Women's Open Championship is an open chess tournament that has been held irregularly. From 1934 through at least 1966 it was held in conjunction with the annual U.S. Open Chess Championship. After some years of inactivity, the event was reinstituted in 2009.

== History ==
From 1934 through 1950 and in 1954, the women's tournaments were held as a round-robin tournament in conjunction with the U.S. Open. From 1951 through 1978, with the exception of 1954, the women played in the U.S. Open with the title U.S. Women's Open Champion being awarded to the woman with the highest score.

After 1978, the title was not awarded until 2009. That year the event was held again with sixteen players in a six-round tournament, in conjunction with the U.S. Senior Open Chess Championship and two other tournaments. Chess Life incorrectly called it the first U.S. Women's Open Championship. The highest-placing US citizen qualified for the U.S. Women's Chess Championship.

The event was then not held until 2015, when it was held in conjunction with the National Open in Las Vegas. It has been held each year since then, except for 2020 due to the COVID-19 pandemic.

== Winners ==
Complete records of the Women's Open Championship are not available.

Year	Location	Champions
1934	Chicago	Virginia Sheffield
1937	Chicago	Jean M. Grau
1938	Boston	Mona May Karff
1939	New York City	Mona May Karff
1948	Baltimore	Mona May Karff
1950	Detroit	Mona May Karff and Lucille Kellner
1951	Fort Worth, Texas	Maxine Cutlip
1953	Milwaukee	Eva Aronson
1954	New Orleans, Louisiana	Gisela Kahn Gresser
1955	Long Beach, California	Sonja Graf
1956	Oklahoma City	Sonja Graf
1957	Cleveland	Sonja Graf
1958	Rochester, Minnesota	Kathryn Slater
1959	Omaha, Nebraska	Sonja Graf
1960	St. Louis	Lisa Lane
1961	San Francisco	Eva Aronson
1962	San Antonio	Kathryn Slater
1963	Chicago	Kate Sillars
1964	Boston	Kathryn Slater and Cecilia Rock
1965	Río Piedras, Puerto Rico	Mary Bain and Kathryn Slater
1966	Seattle	Mary Bain
1967	Atlanta	Mary Bain
1968	Aspen, Colorado	Marilyn Koput
1969	Lincoln, Nebraska	Eva Aronson
1970	Boston	Dinah Dobson
1971	Ventura, California	Mabel Burlingame
1972	Atlantic City, New Jersey	Ruth Donnelly
1973	Chicago	Eva Aronson
1974	New York City	Ruth Donnelly and Ruth Haring
1975	Lincoln, Nebraska	Ruth Cardoso
1976	Fairfax, Virginia	Diane Savereide
1977	Columbus, Ohio	Ruth Orton (née Haring)
1978	Phoenix, Arizona	Diane Savereide
2009	Tulsa, Oklahoma	Nath Saheli
2015	Las Vegas	Simone Liao, Ramya Inapuri, Uyanga Byambaa, and Joanna Liu
2016	Las Vegas	Vera Nebolsina
2017	Las Vegas	Nazí Paikidze
2018	Las Vegas	Saikhanchimeg Tsogtsaikhan
2019	Las Vegas	Megan Lee
2021	Las Vegas	Carla Heredia

== See also ==
- U.S. Open Chess Championship
- U.S. Women's Chess Championship
- U.S. Chess Championship
