= Covali =

Covali is the Romanian form of the name Kowal (Ukrainian: Коваль), meaning "forger" or "blacksmith" in Slavic languages. The surname may refer to:

- Boris Covali, Moldovan singer
- Margareta Perevoznic (1936–2015), née Covali, Romanian chess player
- Vasile Covali, Moldavian politician of Ukrainian descent, member of Sfatul Țării (parliament) of the Moldavian Democratic Republic
