= Marilyn Simmons =

American chess player (1948–2018)

Marilyn Simmons (née Koput, August 25, 1948 – January 30, 2018) was an American chess player who held the title of Women's International Master (WIM). Under an earlier name, Marilyn Braun, she was joint winner, with Eva Aronson, of the U.S. Women's Chess Championship (1972).

== Career ==
Under her maiden name, Marilyn Koput, she won the U.S. Women's Open Chess Championship in 1968, in Aspen, Colorado.

She played in the U.S. Women's Championship four times:

- 1969 3rd place (behind Gresser and Karff)
- 1972 1st-2nd (tied with Aronson)
- 1975 7th-8th
- 1976 4th-6th (Savereide 1st)
