= Haahr =

Haahr may refer to:

- Elijah Haahr (born 1982), American politician
- Merete Haahr (1924–2004), Danish chess master
