= Vanderbeken =

Vanderbeken is a Belgian surname. Notable people with the surname include:

- Caroline Vanderbeken (born 1950), Belgian chess master
- Jamie Vanderbeken (born 1987), British-Canadian professional basketball player
- Joyce Vanderbeken (born 1984), Belgian female cyclo-cross cyclist
