= 4th Women's Chess Olympiad =

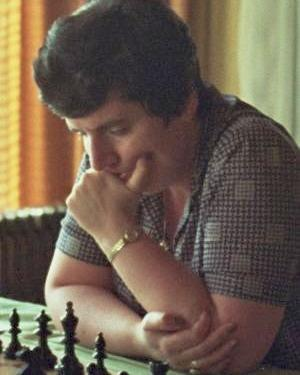
Nona Gaprindashvili

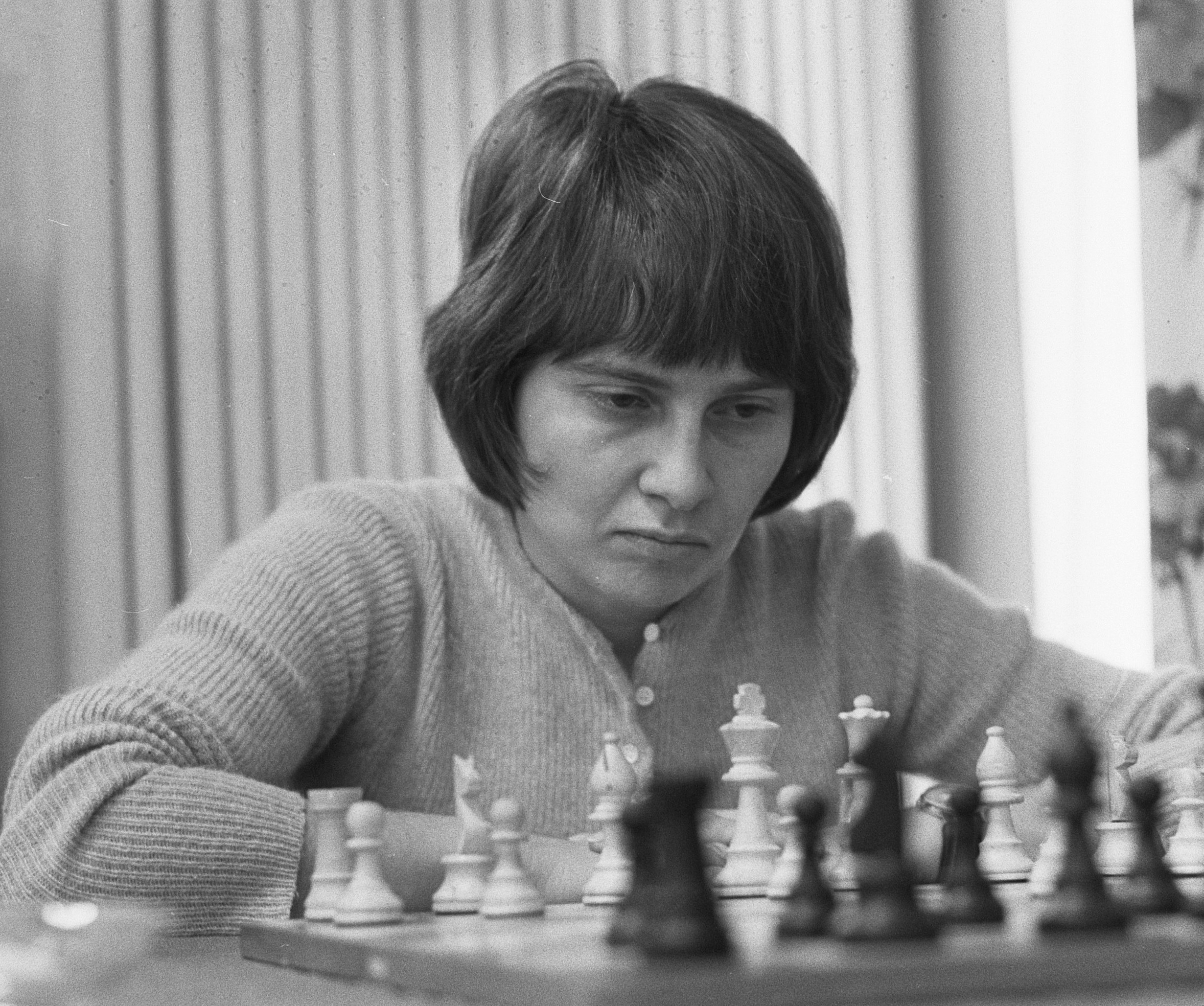
Alla Kushnir

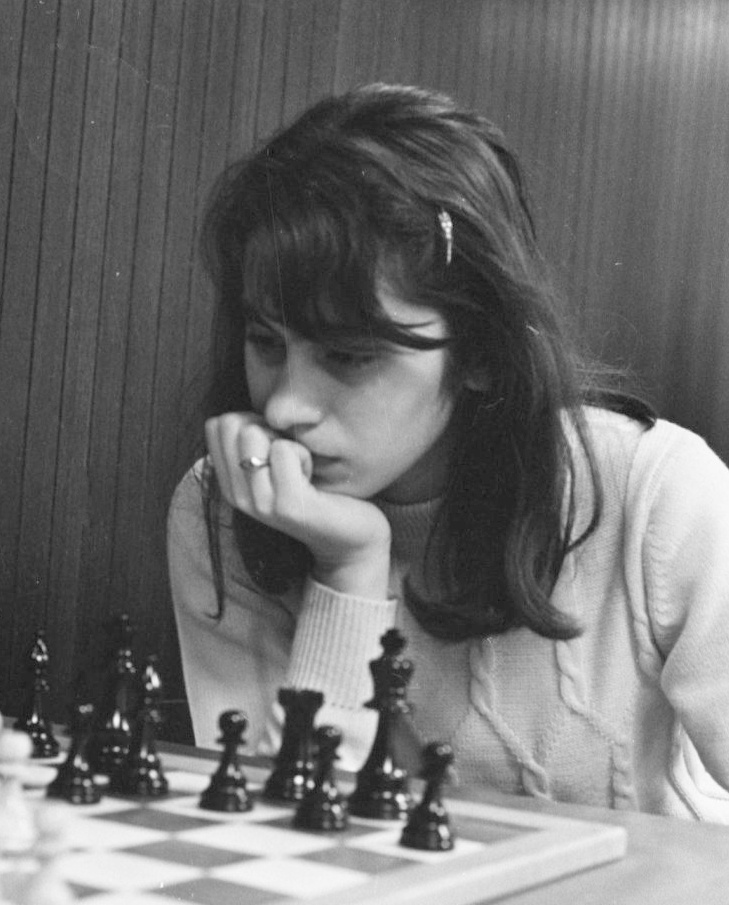
Nana Alexandria

The winning Soviet Union team

The 4th Women's Chess Olympiad, organized by FIDE, took place on 8–23 September 1969 in Lublin, Poland.

== Results ==
A total of 15 two-woman teams entered the competition. It was played as a round-robin tournament.

#	Country	Players	Points	MP
1	Soviet Union	Nona Gaprindashvili, Alla Kushnir, Nana Alexandria	26	
2	Hungary	Mária Ivánka, Zsuzsa Verőci, Károlyné Honfi	20½	
3	Czechoslovakia	Štěpánka Vokřálová, Květa Eretová, Jana Malypetrová	19	
4	Yugoslavia	Tereza Štadler, Henrijeta Konarkowska-Sokolov, Katarina Jovanović-Blagojević	18½	
5	Bulgaria	Venka Asenova, Evelina Trojanska, Antonina Georgieva	17½	
6	East Germany	Waltraud Nowarra, Edith Keller-Herrmann, Gabriele Just	17	
7	Romania	Elisabeta Polihroniade, Gertrude Baumstark, Suzana Makai	16½	17
8	Poland	Krystyna Hołuj-Radzikowska, Mirosława Litmanowicz, Anna Jurczyńska	16½	17
9	Netherlands	Ingrid Tuk, Hendrika Timmer, Fenny Heemskerk	13	
10	England	Dinah Dobson, Rowena Mary Bruce	12½	
11	West Germany	Ursula Wasnetsky, Hannelore Jörger, Irmgard Kärner	10	10
12	Denmark	Merete Haahr, Ingrid Larsen, Johanne Nielsen	10	8
13	Austria	Ingeborg Kattinger, Maria Ager, Wilma Samt	6	
14	Belgium	Caroline Vanderbeken, Louise-Jeanne Loeffler	4½	
15	Ireland	Mary Brannagan, Aileen Noonan, Elizabeth Shaughnessy	2½	

Place	Country	1	2	3	4	5	6	7	8	9	10	11	12	13	14	15	+	-	=	Points
1	Soviet Union	-	1	2	2	2	2	1½	1½	2	2	2	2	2	2	2	13	0	1	26
2	Hungary	1	-	½	1	1½	1½	2	1½	½	2	1	2	2	2	2	9	2	3	20½
3	Czechoslovakia	0	1½	-	½	2	1½	½	1	2	1½	2	1	1½	2	2	9	3	2	19
4	Yugoslavia	0	1	1½	-	1	0	1½	1½	2	2	1½	1	1½	2	2	9	2	3	18½
5	Bulgaria	0	½	0	1	-	1½	1	2	1	1½	2	1½	1½	2	2	8	3	3	17½
6	East Germany	0	½	½	2	½	-	1	1	1	1	2	2	1½	2	2	6	4	4	17
7	Romania	½	0	1½	½	1	1	-	1	1½	1	1	1½	2	2	2	6	3	5	16½
8	Poland	½	½	1	½	0	1	1	-	1½	1½	1½	1½	2	2	2	7	4	3	16½
9	Netherlands	0	1½	0	0	1	1	½	½	-	½	2	1	1½	1½	2	5	6	3	13
10	England	0	0	½	0	½	1	1	½	1½	-	1	1½	1½	2	1½	5	6	3	12½
11	West Germany	0	1	0	½	0	0	1	½	0	1	-	1½	1	1½	2	3	7	4	10
12	Denmark	0	0	1	1	½	0	½	½	1	½	½	-	2	1	1½	2	8	4	10
13	Austria	0	0	½	½	½	½	0	0	½	½	1	0	-	1	1	0	11	3	6
14	Belgium	0	0	0	0	0	0	0	0	½	0	½	1	1	-	1½	1	11	2	4½
15	Ireland	0	0	0	0	0	½	0	0	0	½	0	½	1	½	-	0	13	1	2½

=== Individual medals ===
- Board 1: (Soviet Union) Nona Gaprindashvili 9½ / 10 = 95%
- Board 2: (Soviet Union) Alla Kushnir 8½ / 9 = 94.4%
- Reserve Board: (Soviet Union) Nana Alexandria 8/ 9 = 88.9%
