= Brannagan =

Brannagan is an Irish surname. Notable people with the surname include:

- Cameron Brannagan (born 1996), English professional footballer
- Danny Brannagan (born 1986), Canadian football quarterback
- Mary Brannagan, Irish chess master
