= Owczarek =

Owczarek may refer to:

== People ==
- Andrzej Owczarek (1950–2020), Polish politician
- Bogusław Owczarek (born 1965), Polish equestrian
- Danuta Samolewicz-Owczarek (1929–2006), Polish chess player

== Sheepdogs ==
- Polski Owczarek Nizinny, the Polish Lowland Sheepdog
- Polski Owczarek Podhalański, the Tatra Shepherd Dog
