= Women's World Chess Championship 1969 =

Chess tournament

The 1969 Women's World Chess Championship was won by Nona Gaprindashvili, who successfully defended her title against challenger Alla Kushnir. This was the second of three consecutive title matches between the two strongest female players of their time.

== 1967 Candidates Tournament ==
The Candidates Tournament was held in Subotica in September and October 1967. Unlike the previous tournament three years before, Kushnir won this one outright and again earned the right to challenge the reigning champion Gaprindashvili.

1967 Women's Candidates Tournament
	Player	1	2	3	4	5	6	7	8	9	10	11	12	13	14	15	16	17	18	Points	Tie break
1	Alla Kushnir (Soviet Union)	-	0	½	1	1	1	1	1	1	1	½	1	0	½	1	1	1	1	13½	
2	Valentina Kozlovskaya (Soviet Union)	1	-	½	½	1	1	1	0	1	½	1	0	1	0	1	1	1	1	12½	101.75
3	Tatiana Zatulovskaya (Soviet Union)	½	½	-	1	0	0	½	½	1	½	1	1	1	1	1	1	1	1	12½	92.00
4	Tereza Štadler (Yugoslavia)	0	½	0	-	1	½	1	1	1	1	0	1	1	½	½	1	1	1	12	
5	Alexsandra Kislova (Soviet Union)	0	0	1	0	-	½	0	1	1	½	1	1	½	1	½	1	1	1	11	
6	Verica Nedeljković (Yugoslavia)	0	0	1	½	½	-	½	0	1	½	1	1	½	½	1	1	½	1	10½	
7	Alexandra Nicolau (Romania)	0	0	½	0	1	½	-	1	½	1	½	½	1	½	1	1	0	1	10	74.75
8	Nana Alexandria (Soviet Union)	0	1	½	0	0	1	0	-	½	1	1	0	1	½	1	1	1	½	10	74.00
9	Milunka Lazarević (Yugoslavia)	0	0	0	0	0	0	½	½	-	1	1	1	1	1	1	1	1	1	10	61.00
10	Waltraud Nowarra (East Germany)	0	½	½	0	½	½	0	0	0	-	½	1	½	½	½	1	1	1	8	
11	Margareta Perevoznic (Romania)	½	0	0	1	0	0	½	0	0	½	-	½	0	1	1	0	1	1	7	49.25
12	Henrijeta Konarkowska-Sokolov (Yugoslavia)	0	1	0	0	0	0	½	1	0	0	½	-	0	½	1	½	1	1	7	48.50
13	Fenny Heemskerk (Netherlands)	1	0	0	0	½	½	0	0	0	½	1	1	-	½	0	0	1	½	6½	
14	Gisela Kahn Gresser (USA)	½	1	0	½	0	½	½	½	0	½	0	½	½	-	0	½	0	0	5½	53.50
15	Venka Asenova (Bulgaria)	0	0	0	½	½	0	0	0	0	½	0	0	1	1	-	1	½	½	5½	35.50
16	Marion McGrath (Australia)	0	0	0	0	0	0	0	0	0	0	1	½	1	½	0	-	½	1	4½	
17	Clara Friedman (Israel)	0	0	0	0	0	½	1	0	0	0	0	0	0	1	½	½	-	½	4	
18	Eva Aronson (USA)	0	0	0	0	0	0	0	½	0	0	0	0	½	1	½	0	½	-	3	

== 1969 Championship Match ==
The championship match was played in Tbilisi and Moscow in 1969. Once again, there was never really any doubt about who was the strongest of the two players.

Women's World Championship Match 1969
	1	2	3	4	5	6	7	8	9	10	11	12	13	Total
Alla Kushnir (Soviet Union)	1	½	0	1	0	0	½	0	½	0	½	0	½	4½
Nona Gaprindashvili (Soviet Union)	0	½	1	0	1	1	½	1	½	1	½	1	½	8½

== Games of Match ==
- Gaprindashvili-Kushnir Title Match 1969 13 games on chessgames.com
- Gaprindashvili-Kushnir Title Match 1969 13 games on 365chess.com
- Gaprindashvili-Kushnir Title Match 1969 13 games on chesstempo.com
