= Aleksandra Kislova =

Soviet and Russian chess player

Personal information
- Full name: Aleksandra Vladimirovna Kislova
- Born: 20 December 1946 (age 79) Frunze, Kyrgyzstan

Chess career
- Country: Soviet Union; Russia
- Title: Woman International Master (1966)
- FIDE rating: 2165 (January 1992)
- Peak rating: 2230 (January 1975)

Aleksandra Vladimirovna Kislova (Russian: Александра Владимировна Кислова; born 20 December 1946) is a Soviet and Russian chess player who holds the FIDE title of Woman International Master (WIM).

== Biography ==
In 1962, Kislova ranked 4th in the USSR girl's chess championship. In 1966, she first time participated in Women's Soviet Chess Championship and won silver medal after winner Nana Alexandria. In 1966, Kislova awarded the FIDE Woman International Master (WIM) title. In 1967, she participated at the Women's World Chess Championship Candidates Tournament in Subotica and ranked 5th place. During this time she is one of the world's first tenth women's chess players.

Unfortunately, this success could not be repeated later. In Women's Soviet Chess Championships, Kislova did not enter the prize-winning places: she shared 6th — 8th in 1971, shared 9th — 12th in 1972, shared 8th — 10th in 1973, ranked 13th in 1974, ranked 18th in 1976 and ranked 10th in 1977. She twice in a row won the Russian SFSR Women's Chess Championship (1974, 1975). Kislova was a member of the SFSR team who won the Soviet Team Chess Championship in 1975 and ranked second in 1967. Also she won silver (1966) and bronze (1974) medals in Soviet Team Chess Cup with the sports association Trud team. In the International Women's Chess tournaments, Kislova ranked 3rd in Petrozavodsk (1966), ranked 2nd in Lipetsk (1974) and shared 2nd — 3rd in Cherepovets (1975).

Since 1992, she has not participated in tournaments classified by the FIDE.
