= Hannelore Jörger-Weichert =

German chess player (born 1942)

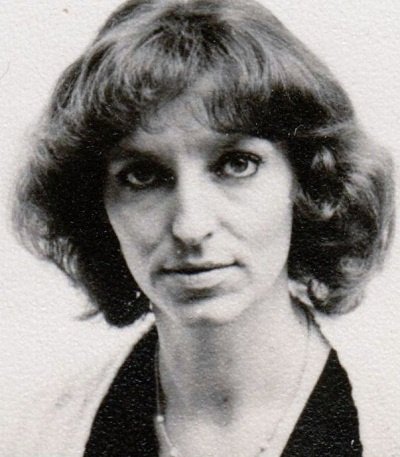
- Hannelore Jörger-Weichert in 1978

Personal information
- Born: 1942 (age 83–84)

Chess career
- Country: Germany
- Peak rating: 2120 (January 1990)

Hannelore Jörger-Weichert (born 1942), née Jörger, also Weichert, is a German chess player.

== Biography ==
In the 1960s and the 1970s, she was one of West Germany's leading women chess players. In 1966, she won the Bavaria Women's Chess Championship. From 1967 to 1969, she won the Hesse Women's Chess Championships three times in a row. She two times took the 2nd place in the West Germany Women's Chess Championships after winner Anni Laakmann (1974, 1976).

Hannelore Jörger-Weichert played for West Germany in the Women's Chess Olympiads:

- In 1969, at second board in the 4th Chess Olympiad (women) in Lublin (+3, =1, -5),
- In 1976, at second board in the 7th Chess Olympiad (women) in Haifa (+3, =4, -3),
- In 1978, at first reserve board in the 8th Chess Olympiad (women) in Buenos Aires (+2, =3, -1) and won the team bronze medal.
