= Vera Nebolsina =

Russian chess player (born 1989)

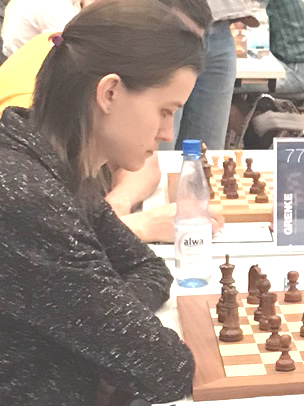
- Karlsruhe 2019

Personal information
- Born: 16 December 1989 (age 36) Seversk, Soviet Union

Chess career
- Country: Russia (until 2022); France (since 2022)
- Title: Woman Grandmaster (2007)
- Peak rating: 2389 (January 2011)

Vera Nebolsina (Russian: Вера Неболсина; born 16 December 1989 in Seversk) is a Russian professional chess player. She earned the title Woman Grandmaster (WGM) at age 17 in 2007. In 2022 she switched to the French Chess Federation.

== Early life ==
Nebolsina was born in Seversk near Tomsk in western Siberia to Chess Master Valery Nebolsin and Tatiana; the family also lived in Novosibirsk. Her mother began teaching her basic chess moves when Nebolsina was four and introduced her to other board games, such as draughts and Go. Her father coached her to further develop her chess skills and by age six, she was playing in formal tournaments, oftentimes in categories above her age group.

== Chess career ==
At age seven, Nebolsina won the Russian Girls Under 8 Championship. She won the World Youth Championship for girls under 10 in Oropesa del Mar at eight years old. By age twelve, she was playing the Russian Women's 1st League and in 2004 she earned the title Woman International Master. In 2007, when she was just seventeen, she won the World Junior Championship for Girls (under 20) at Yerevan, which qualified her for the title of Woman Grandmaster. The highest rating of her career thus far came in January 2011, when her FIDE rating was 2389, and her highest junior ranking was #12 among the world's top 20 girl players. Nebolsina describes herself as a positional player who can also be a tactician. In 2016, she won the U.S. Women's Open Chess Championship.

=== Playing style ===
Nebolsina vs. Gromova, Sochi 2007

Position: a8 black rook, f8 black queen, g8 black king, h8 white queen, f7 black pawn, g6 black pawn, d5 white pawn, e5 white rook, h5 black pawn, a4 black pawn, h4 white pawn, b3 black bishop, f3 white pawn, b2 white bishop, g2 white pawn, h1 white king

Final position

Although the following game is not without errors, Nebolsina's play shows the importance of piece mobility over pawn moves, of which there are few. Despite spirited defence from her opponent, Nebolsina finds a pleasing queen sacrifice to conclude matters. The sample game below ably demonstrates her alertness to tactical possibilities.

Vera Nebolsina vs. Iulia Gromova, Russian Team Championship, Sochi 2007; Caro–Kann, Panov–Botvinnik Attack (B14)
1. e4 c6 2. d4 d5 3. exd5 cxd5 4. c4 Nf6 5. Nc3 g6 6. cxd5 Nxd5 7. Bb5+ Nc6 8. Nf3 Bg7 9. Qb3 Nxc3 10. bxc3 0-0 11. 0-0 a6 12. Bxc6 bxc6 13. Ba3 Be6 14. Qb4 Bf6 15. Ne5 c5 16. Qxc5 Rc8 17. Nc6 Qc7 18. Nxe7+ Bxe7 19. Qxe7 Qxc3 20. Bc5 Rfe8 21. Qh4 Bd5 22. Be7 Qc6 23. f3 Qb6 24. Rfe1 Rc2 25. Bc5 Qc6 26. Rxe8+ Qxe8 27. Re1 Qc8 28. Qe7 h5 29. Qg5 Bxa2 30. Re5 a5 31. h4 a4 32. Qh6 Bb3 33. Be7 Rc6 34. d5 Ra6 35. Ba3 Ra8 36. Bb2 Qc5+ 37. Kh1 Qf8 38. Qh8+ (if 38...Kxh8, then 39.Rxh5+ Kg8 40.Rh8#) 1–0

== Personal life ==
Nebolsina is a moral vegetarian. As of September 2020, she lives with her husband Gata Kamsky in France, where she is enrolled at university. In 2011, she was attending Novosibirsk State Technical University as an International Relations/Oriental Studies student and spent two years studying in China at Qingdao University. She also attended Moscow State University, where she studied English and Chinese. She knows Chinese and French and is fluent in Russian and English. In 2015, she spoke at a TED (conference)#TEDx in her hometown of Novosibirsk.
