= Peggy Steedman =

Scottish chess player

Personal information
- Born: 1905
- Died: 6 October 1975

Chess career
- Country: Scotland

Sarah Margaret Steedman (1905 – 6 October 1975), née Wilson, was a Scottish chess master. She was a four-times winner the Scottish Women's Chess Championship.

== Biography ==
From the 1950s to the 1960s, Peggy Steedman was one of Scotland's strongest female chess players. She four times won the Scottish Women's Chess Championships: 1951, 1956 (jointly), 1959 and 1969 (jointly).

Peggy Steedman played for Scotland in the Women's Chess Olympiads:

- In 1957, at first board in the 1st Chess Olympiad (women) in Emmen (+0, =3, -8),
- In 1963, at first board in the 2nd Chess Olympiad (women) in Split (+1, =2, -11).

In the 1950s Peggy Steedman joined the British Ladies' Chess Association and was for many years Honorary Secretary and Vice President of this organisation. Also she was a founder member and President of the Lanarkshire Chess League.
