= Aileen Noonan =

Irish chess player

Personal information
- Born: 1950 (age 75–76)

Chess career
- Country: Ireland

Aileen Noonan (born 1950) is an Irish chess player. In the 1970s, Noonan was one of Ireland's leading female chess players and won Irish Women's Chess Championship in 1971.

Noonan played for Ireland in the Women's Chess Olympiads:

- In 1969, at second board in the 4th Chess Olympiad (women) in Lublin (+2, =2, -5),
- In 1972, at second board in the 5th Chess Olympiad (women) in Skopje (+2, =0, -7),
- In 1974, at second board in the 6th Chess Olympiad (women) in Medellín (+2, =0, -5),
- In 1976, at third board in the 7th Chess Olympiad (women) in Haifa (+2, =2, -5).
