= 3rd Women's Chess Olympiad =

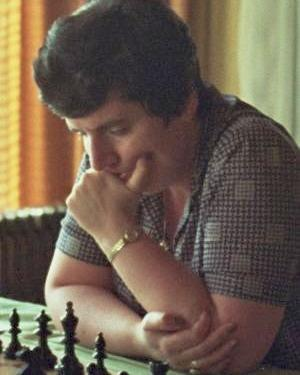
Nona Gaprindashvili

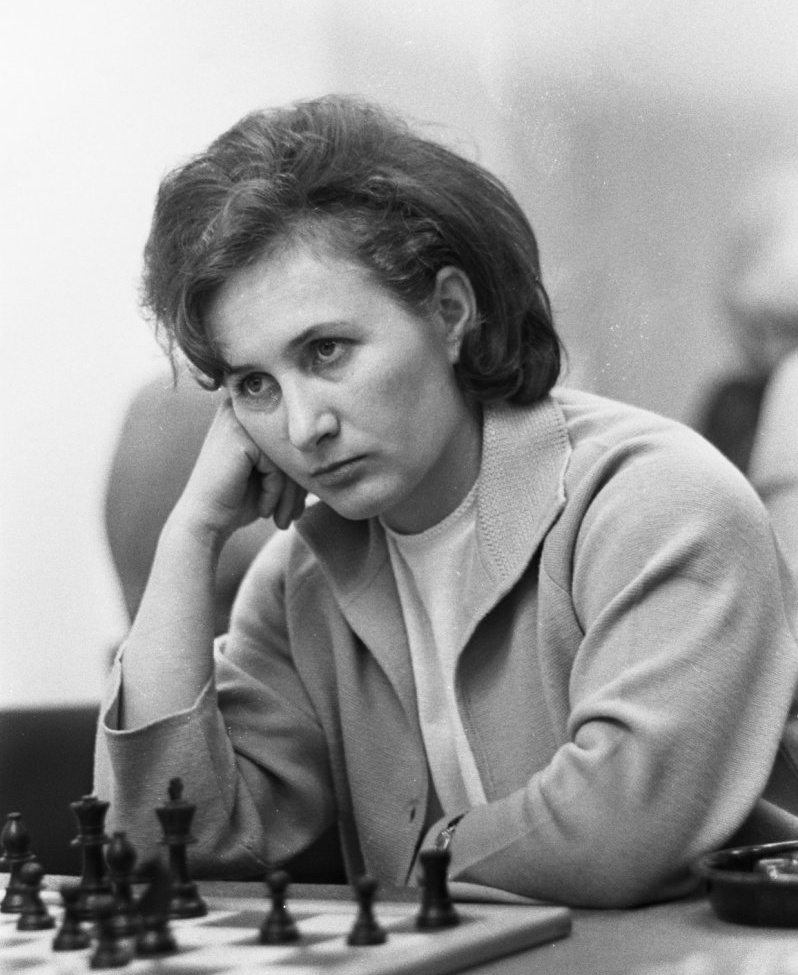
Valentina Kozlovskaya

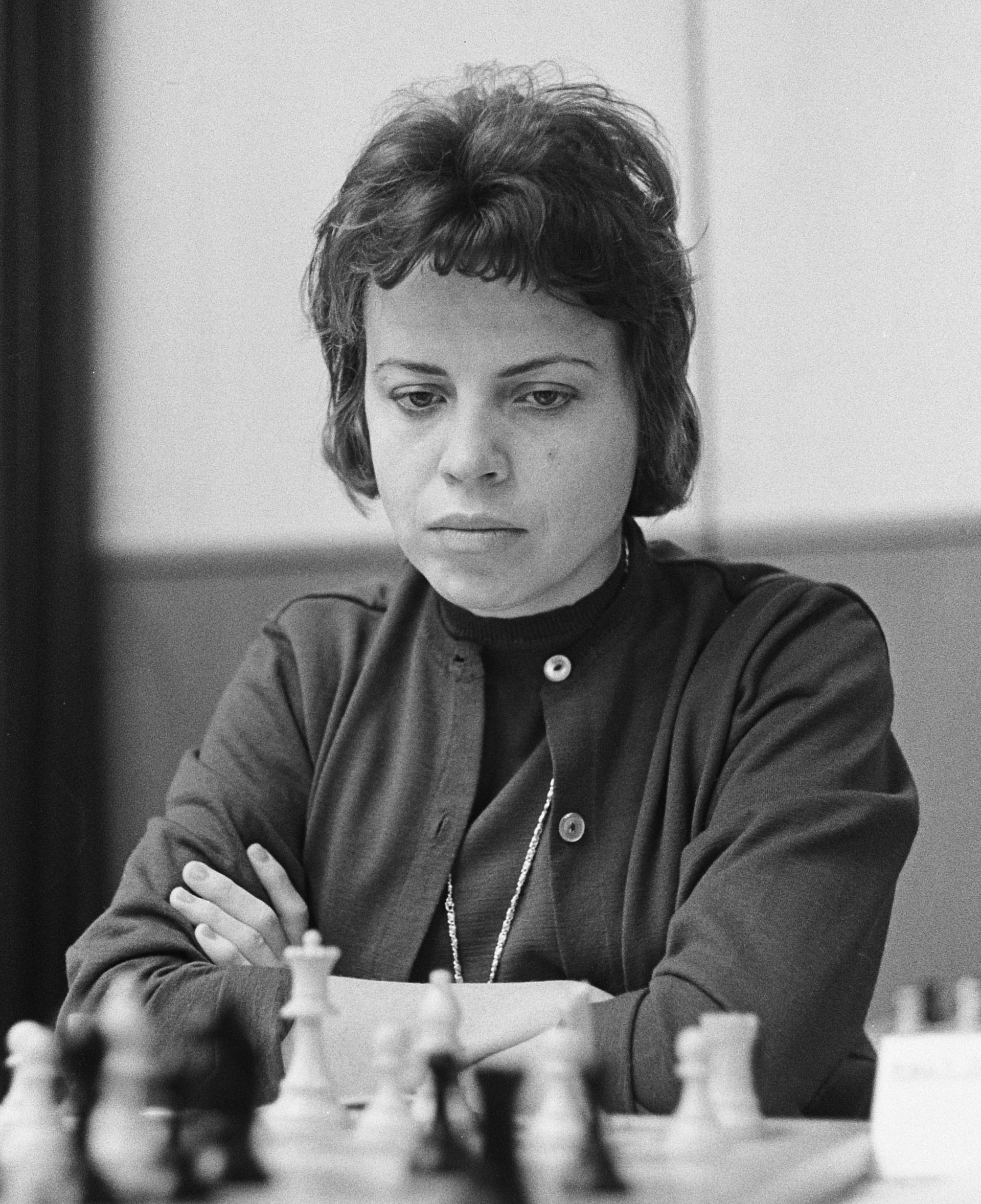
Tatiana Zatulovskaya

The winning Soviet Union team

The 3rd Women's Chess Olympiad, organized by the FIDE, took place in 1966 in Oberhausen, West Germany.

== Results ==
A total of 14 two-woman teams entered the competition. It was played as a round-robin tournament.

#	Country	Players	Points	MP
1	Soviet Union	Nona Gaprindashvili, Valentina Kozlovskaya, Tatiana Zatulovskaya	22	
2	Romania	Alexandra Nicolau, Elisabeta Polihroniade, Margareta Perevoznic	20½	
3	East Germany	Edith Keller-Herrmann, Waltraud Nowarra, Gabriele Just	17	
4	Yugoslavia	Milunka Lazarević, Verica Nedeljković, Katarina Jovanović-Blagojević	16½	
5	Netherlands	Corry Vreeken-Bouwman, Hendrika Timmer, Fenny Heemskerk	16	
6	Czechoslovakia	Květa Eretová, Jana Malypetrová, Marta Poláková	15	16
7	Hungary	Éva Karakas, Gyuláné Krizsán-Bilek, Zsuzsa Verőci	15	16
8	Bulgaria	Venka Asenova, Evelina Trojanska, Antonina Georgieva	14	
9	England	Anne Sunnucks, Rowena Mary Bruce, Dinah Dobson	12	
10	United States	Gisela Kahn Gresser, Lisa Lane, Eva Aronson	9½	
11	Poland	Krystyna Hołuj-Radzikowska, Mirosława Litmanowicz, Danuta Samolewicz-Owczarek	9	
12	West Germany	Friedl Rinder, Ottilie Stibaner, Irmgard Kärner	6½	
13	Denmark	Ingrid Larsen, Antonina Enevoldsen	5	
14	Austria	Ingeborg Kattinger, Maria Ager, Alfreda Hausner	4	

Place	Country	1	2	3	4	5	6	7	8	9	10	11	12	13	14	+	-	=	Points
1	Soviet Union	-	0	1	2	2	1½	2	2	1½	2	2	2	2	2	11	1	1	22
2	Romania	2	-	1	2	2	1½	1	1½	1½	0	2	2	2	2	10	1	2	20½
3	East Germany	1	1	-	½	1	½	1	1	1	2	2	2	2	2	5	2	6	17
4	Yugoslavia	0	0	1½	-	1½	1	1	1	1½	1½	1½	2	2	2	8	2	3	16½
5	Netherlands	0	0	1	½	-	1	1½	2	1½	1½	2	1½	1½	2	8	3	2	16
6	Czechoslovakia	½	½	1½	1	1	-	1	1	1½	1½	1	1½	1	2	5	2	6	15
7	Hungary	0	1	1	1	½	1	-	1	1	2	2	1½	1½	1½	5	2	6	15
8	Bulgaria	0	½	1	1	0	1	1	-	1	2	1	1½	2	2	4	3	6	14
9	England	½	½	1	½	½	½	1	1	-	1½	1	1½	1	1½	3	5	5	12
10	United States	0	2	0	½	½	½	0	0	½	-	1	2	1½	1	3	8	2	9½
11	Poland	0	0	0	½	0	1	0	1	1	1	-	½	2	2	2	7	4	9
12	West Germany	0	0	0	0	½	½	½	½	½	0	1½	-	2	½	2	11	0	6½
13	Denmark	0	0	0	0	½	1	½	0	1	½	0	0	-	1½	1	10	2	5
14	Austria	0	0	0	0	0	0	½	0	½	1	0	1½	½	-	1	11	1	4

=== Individual medals ===
- Board 1: (Soviet Union) Nona Gaprindashvili 9 / 11 = 81.8%
- Board 2: (Romania) Elisabeta Polihroniade 7½ / 9 = 83.3%
- Reserve Board: (Soviet Union) Tatiana Zatulovskaya 8½/ 9 = 94.4%
