= 2nd Women's Chess Olympiad =

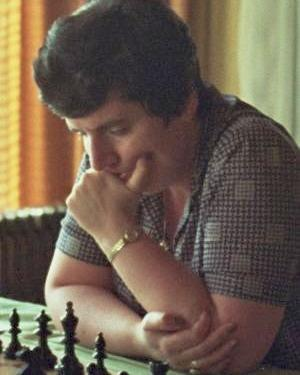
Nona Gaprindashvili

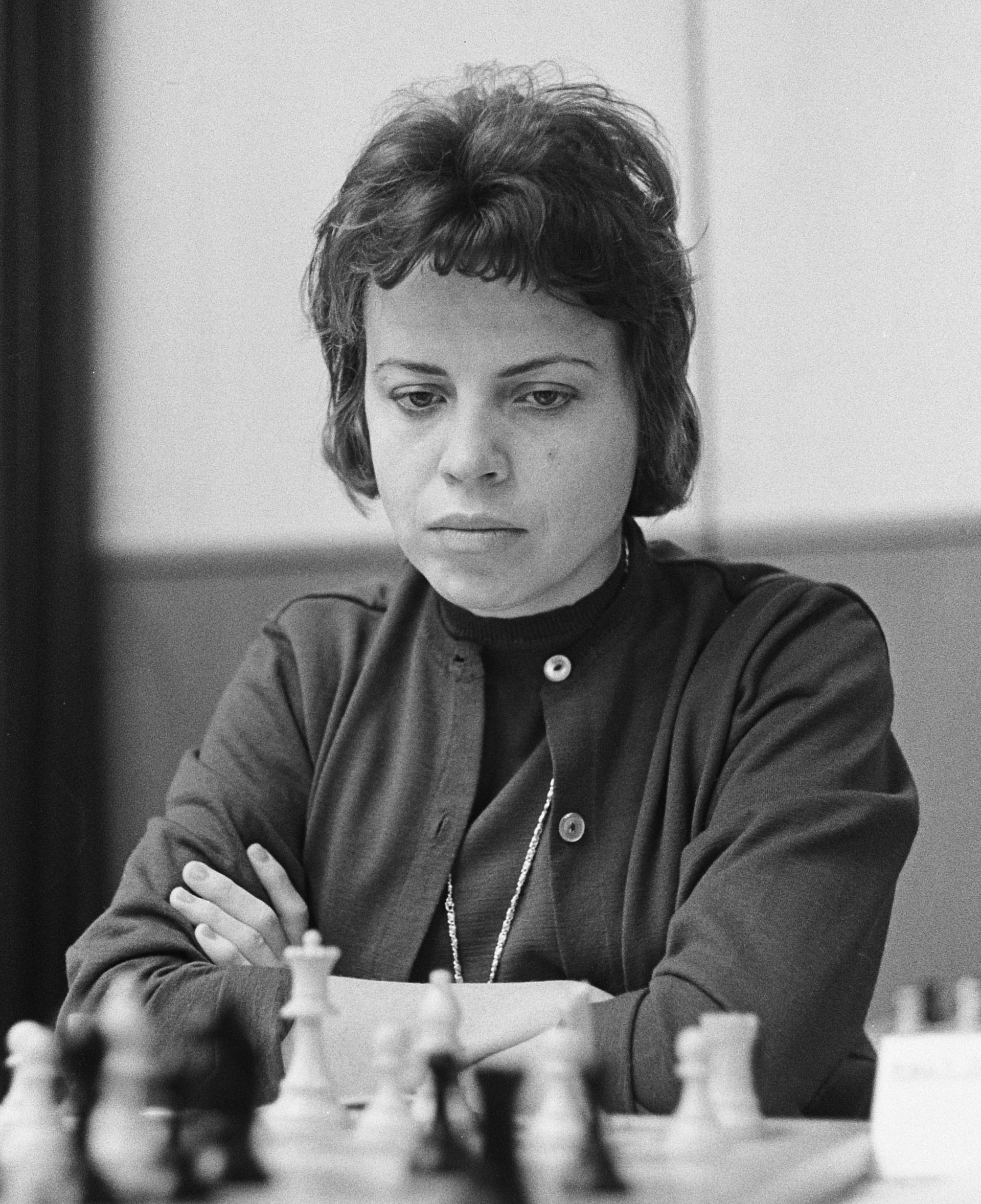
Tatiana Zatulovskaya

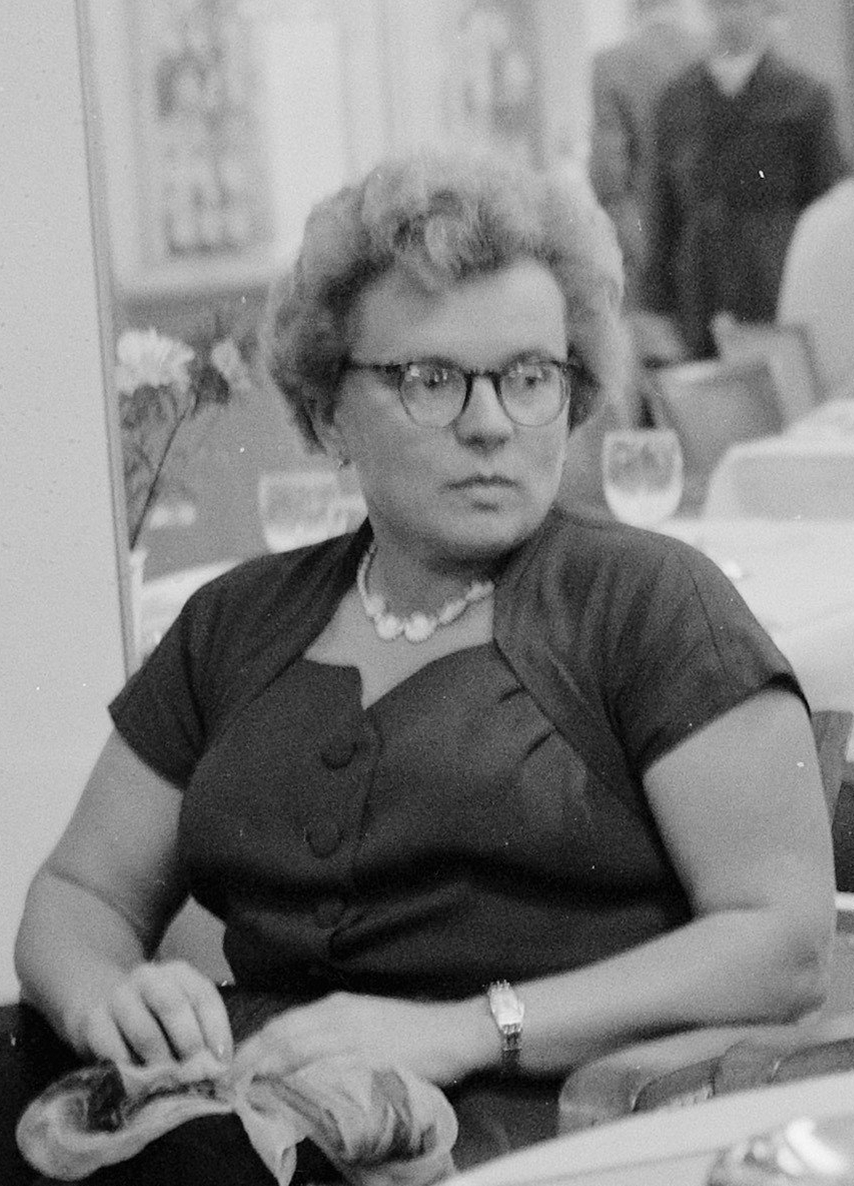
Kira Zvorykina

The winning Soviet Union team

The 2nd Women's Chess Olympiad, organized by the FIDE, took place between 22 September and 12 October 1963, in Split, SFR Yugoslavia.

== Results ==
A total of 15 two-woman teams entered the competition. It was played as a round-robin tournament.

#	Country	Players	Points	MP
1	Soviet Union	Nona Gaprindashvili, Tatiana Zatulovskaya, Kira Zvorykina	25	
2	Yugoslavia	Milunka Lazarević, Verica Nedeljković, Katarina Jovanović-Blagojević	24½	
3	East Germany	Edith Keller-Herrmann, Waltraud Nowarra, Eveline Kraatz	21	
4	Romania	Alexandra Nicolau, Margareta Teodorescu, Margareta Perevoznic	18½	
5	Bulgaria	Venka Asenova, Antonia Ivanova, Paunka Todorova	17½	
6	Hungary	Éva Karakas, Gyuláné Krizsán-Bilek, Judit Gombás	17	
7	Netherlands	Corry Vreeken-Bouwman, Fenny Heemskerk, Hendrika Timmer	15½	
8	Poland	Henrijeta Konarkowska-Sokolov, Krystyna Hołuj-Radzikowska, Mirosława Litmanowicz	15	
9	United States	Gisela Kahn Gresser, Mary Bain	12½	
10	West Germany	Friedl Rinder, Anneliese Brandler, Marianne Kulke	10½	11
11	Mongolia	Ganginchugin Hulgana, Sandagdorj Handsuren	10½	10
12	Austria	Ingeborg Kattinger, Wilma Samt, Hilde Kasperowski	8	
13	Monaco	Anne Marie Renoy-Chevrier, Madeleine Cauquil	5	4
14	Belgium	Louise-Jeanne Loeffler, Elisabeth Cuypers, Simone Lancel	5	4
15	Scotland	Peggy Steedman, Nancy Elder	4½	

Place	Country	1	2	3	4	5	6	7	8	9	10	11	12	13	14	15	+	-	=	Points
1	Soviet Union	-	1	1	1½	1½	2	2	2	2	2	2	2	2	2	2	12	0	2	25
2	Yugoslavia	1	-	1½	1	1½	2	1½	2	2	2	2	2	2	2	2	12	0	2	24½
3	East Germany	1	½	-	1	2	½	1	2	2	2	2	1½	1½	2	2	9	2	3	21
4	Romania	½	1	1	-	0	1½	1½	1½	1	1½	2	2	2	1	2	8	2	4	18½
5	Bulgaria	½	½	0	2	-	1½	½	½	1	1½	2	2	1½	2	2	8	5	1	17½
6	Hungary	0	0	1½	½	½	-	1	1½	1½	2	1½	2	1½	2	1½	9	4	1	17
7	Netherlands	0	½	1	½	1½	1	-	1	1½	1½	1	1	2	1	2	5	3	6	15½
8	Poland	0	0	0	½	1½	½	1	-	1	½	2	2	2	2	2	6	6	2	15
9	United States	0	0	0	1	1	½	½	1	-	2	0	1½	2	1	2	4	6	4	12½
10	West Germany	0	0	0	½	½	0	½	1½	0	-	1	1½	2	1½	1½	5	8	1	10½
11	Mongolia	0	0	0	0	0	½	1	0	2	1	-	½	2	2	1½	4	8	2	10½
12	Austria	0	0	½	0	0	0	1	0	½	½	1½	-	1	1	2	2	9	3	8
13	Monaco	0	0	½	0	½	½	0	0	0	0	0	1	-	1½	1	1	11	2	5
14	Belgium	0	0	0	1	0	0	1	0	1	½	0	1	½	-	0	0	10	4	5
15	Scotland	0	0	0	0	0	½	0	0	0	½	½	0	1	2	-	1	12	1	4½

=== Individual medals ===
- Board 1: (Soviet Union) Nona Gaprindashvili 11½ / 12 = 95.8%
- Board 2: (Socialist Federal Republic of Yugoslavia) Verica Nedeljković 12 / 12 = 100%
- Reserve Board: (Netherlands) Hendrika Timmer 6½/ 9 = 72.2%
