= Dinah Margaret Norman =

English chess player (born 1946)

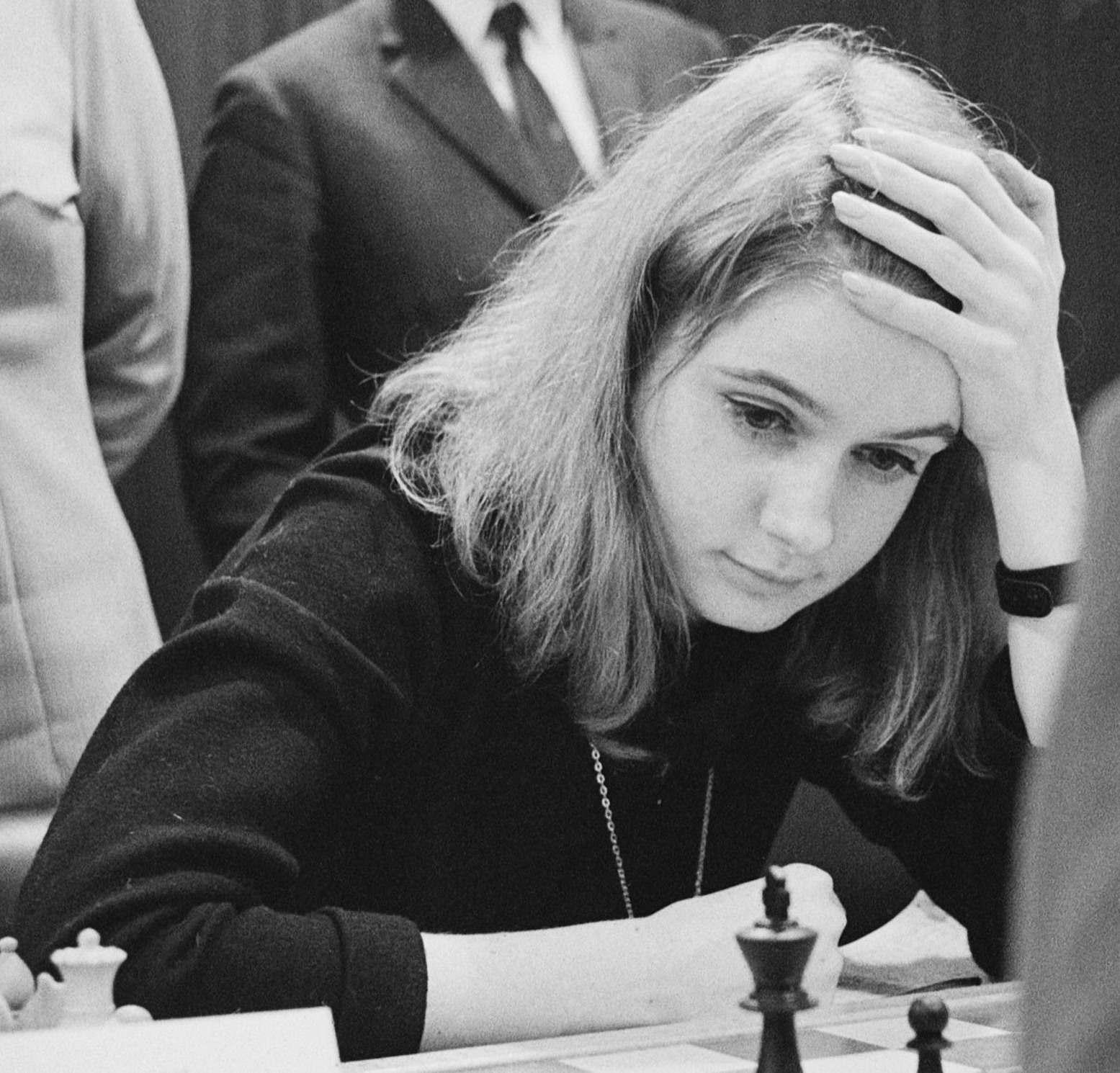
- Dinah Dobson Norman (Hoogovens, 1969)

Personal information
- Born: 21 August 1946 (age 79) Exeter, Devon, England

Chess career
- Country: England
- Title: Woman Candidate Master
- Peak rating: 2053 (January 2000)

Dinah Margaret Norman (born 21 August 1946), née Dobson, is an English chess player. She was a three-time winner of the British Women's Chess Championship (1967, 1968, 1969).

== Biography ==
In the 1960s and 1970s, Dinah Margaret Norman was one of England's strongest female chess players. She won the British Women's Chess Championship three times: 1967 (shared 1st place with Rowena Mary Bruce), 1968 and 1969 (shared 1st place with Rowena Mary Bruce). In 1970, she participated in FIDE Women's World Chess Championship cycle European zonal tournament in Vrnjačka Banja where ranked in 12th place. In 1970, she won U.S. Women's Open Chess Championship in Boston.

Dinah Margaret Norman played for England in the Women's Chess Olympiads:

- In 1966, at first reserve board in the 3rd Chess Olympiad (women) in Oberhausen (+0, =1, -2),
- In 1969, at first board in the 4th Chess Olympiad (women) in Lublin (+1, =10, -3).

Dinah Margaret Norman has been a member of Crowthorne Chess Club and played in the Berkshire League.
