= Maria Ager =

Austrian chess player

Chess career
- Country: Austria

Maria Ager (unknown – unknown) was an Austrian chess player, Austrian Women's Chess Championship medalist (1966, 1968).

== Biography ==
In the 1960s Maria Ager was one of the leading Austrian women's chess players. In Austrian Women's Chess Championship she won two medals: silver (1966) and bronze (1968).

Maria Ager played for Austria in the Women's Chess Olympiads:

- In 1966, at second board in the 3rd Chess Olympiad (women) in Oberhausen (+1, =1, -7),
- In 1969, at second board in the 4th Chess Olympiad (women) in Lublin (+2, =1, -11).
