= Nancy Elder =

Scottish chess player (1915–1981)

Personal information
- Born: 25 May 1915 Kirkmabreck, Scotland
- Died: 4 March 1981 (aged 65) Perth, Australia

Chess career
- Country: Scotland

Nancy Conchar Elder MBE (25 May 1915 – 4 March 1981), née Gordon, was a Scottish chess master. She was a sixteen-times winner the Scottish Women's Chess Championship.

== Biography ==
From the 1950s to the 1980s, Nancy Elder was one of Scotland's strongest female chess players. She sixteen times won the Scottish Women's Chess Championships: 1950, 1956 (jointly), 1957, 1958, 1961, 1962, 1963, 1964, 1966, 1967, 1968, 1970, 1971, 1972, 1973 and 1980.

Nancy Elder played for Scotland in the Women's Chess Olympiads:

- In 1963, at second board in the 2nd Chess Olympiad (women) in Split (+1, =3, -10),
- In 1972, at first board in the 5th Chess Olympiad (women) in Skopje (+2, =2, -4),
- In 1976, at first board in the 7th Chess Olympiad (women) in Haifa (+0, =5, -5),
- In 1978, at third board in the 8th Chess Olympiad (women) in Buenos Aires (+5, =3, -4),
- In 1980, at second board in the 9th Chess Olympiad (women) in Valletta (+3, =5, -4).

Nancy Elder working as a teacher of music and physical training. She was President of Dundee Chess Club, chairman of the congress committee of the Scottish Chess Association and on the council of the Scottish Junior Chess Association. In 1974, for her services to chess she was awarded the Most Excellent Order of the British Empire. In 1981, Nancy Elder died after a heart attack on the flight in Perth, Western Australia.
