= Evelina Trojanska =

Bulgarian chess player

Personal information
- Born: November 15, 1929
- Died: 2000

Chess career
- Country: Bulgaria
- Title: Woman International Master (1972)
- Peak rating: 2070 (July 1989)

Evelina Trojanska (Bulgarian: Евелина Троянска; 15 November 1929 – 2000) was a Bulgarian chess player. She was awarded the title of Woman International Master (WIM) by FIDE in 1972.

== Biography ==
In the 1960s and the 1970s, Evelina Trojanska was one of the leading Bulgarian female chess players. She won the Bulgarian women's championship in 1973.

Evelina Trojanska played for Bulgaria in the Women's Chess Olympiads:

- In 1966, a second board in the 3rd Women's Chess Olympiad in Oberhausen (+1, =1, -5),
- In 1969, a second board in the 4th Women's Chess Olympiad in Lublin (+4, =2, -1).

She was married to the Bulgarian writer Anton Donchev. She died in a car crash.
