= Hendrika Timmer =

Dutch chess player (1925–1994)

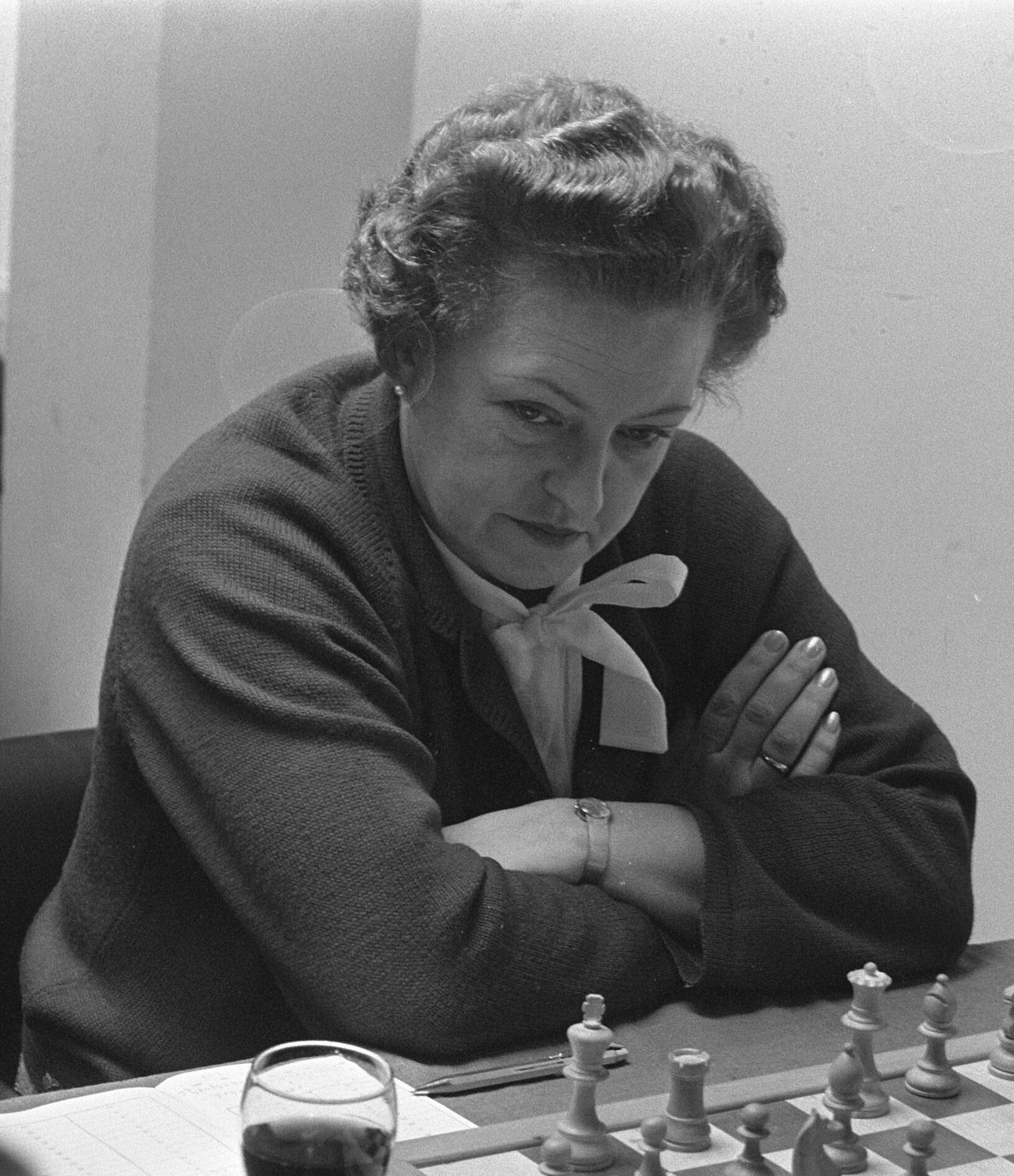

Personal information
- Born: 1925 Ermelo, Netherlands
- Died: February 10, 1994 (aged 68–69) Apeldoorn, Netherlands

Chess career
- Country: Netherlands

Hendrika Timmer (6 October 1925 – 10 February 1994), also Hendrika Geertruida Timmer or Rie Timmer, was a Dutch chess player. She was a two-time winner of the Dutch Women's Chess Championship (1971, 1972).

== Biography ==
From mid-1960s to mid-1970s, Hendrika Timmer was one of the leading Dutch women's chess players. She twice in a row won Dutch Women's Chess Championships (1971, 1972). Participant of many international chess tournaments. The best results have been achieved in the Beverwijk in 1960, when she took 3rd place, and Emmen in 1969, when she was in 2nd place.

Timmer played for Netherlands in the Women's Chess Olympiads:

- In 1963, at first reserve board in the 2nd Chess Olympiad (women) in Split (+5, =3, -1) and won the individual gold medal,
- In 1966, at second board in the 3rd Chess Olympiad (women) in Oberhausen (+4, =2, -2) and won the individual silver medal,
- In 1969, at second board in the 4th Chess Olympiad (women) in Lublin (+6, =2, -4),
- In 1972, at first board in the 5th Chess Olympiad (women) in Skopje (+5, =1, -3).

Timmer grew up in Ermelo and permanently returned to her home town when her parents were aging. On 7 February 1994, Timmer suffered a heart attack during a chess match in Apeldoorn. She died in a hospital there three days later.
