= Zsuzsa Makai =

Romanian-Hungarian chess player

Personal information
- Born: September 3, 1945 Oradea, Romania
- Died: 12 May 1987 (aged 41) Budapest, Hungary

Chess career
- Country: Romania; Hungary
- Title: Woman International Master (1970)

Zsuzsa Makai (3 September 1945 – 12 May 1987), born as Suzana Makai, was a Romanian and Hungarian chess player. She holds the title of Woman International Master (WIM, 1970). She is a Hungarian Women's Chess Champion (1980).

== Early life ==
She was born to a Hungarian medical family in Romania. She learned to play chess at age 12. In 1959, she won the Romanian Youth Chess Championship. In 1960, at age fifteen, she debuted in the Romanian Women's Chess Championship. Thereafter she won 5 medals there: 3 silver (1966, 1974, 1976) and 2 bronzes (1972, 1975). Between 1972 and 1976, she won the Romanian team chess championship five times with Timișoarateam Timișoara Medicine. In 1970, she was awarded the FIDE Woman International Master (WIM) title.

In 1977 she moved to Hungary and in the same year won the bronze medal in the Hungarian Women's Chess Championship. In 1980, she won that contest.

Makai played for Romania and Hungaria in the Women's Chess Olympiads:

- In 1969, at first reserve board in the 4th Women's Chess Olympiad in Lublin (+5, =3, -0) and won individual silver medal.
- In 1978, at third board in the 8th Chess Olympiad (women) in Buenos Aires (+5, =4, -1) and won team silver medal.
