= Károlyné Honfi =

Hungarian chess player

Personal information
- Born: 16 April 1933 Budapest, Hungary
- Died: 10 October 2010 (aged 77) Budapest, Hungary

Chess career
- Country: Hungary
- Title: Woman International Master (1969)
- Peak rating: 2095 (January 1987)

Károlyné Honfi (16 April 1933 – 10 October 2010) was a Hungarian chess player who held the FIDE title of Woman International Master (WIM, 1969). She was a winner of the Hungarian Women's Chess Championship (1961).

== Biography ==
From the end of the 1950s to the end of the 1960s, Károlyné Honfi was one of the leading Hungarian women's chess players. She has won medals in the Hungarian Women's Chess Championships five times: gold (1962) and four silver (1959, 1963, 1964, 1968). In 1969, she was awarded the FIDE Woman International Master (WIM) title.

Károlyné Honfi played for Hungary in the Women's Chess Olympiad:

- In 1969, at first reserve board in the 4th Chess Olympiad (women) in Lublin (+2, =1, -1) and won the team silver medal.

Also known as a correspondence chess player. Károlyné Honfi played for Hungary in 2nd Women's Correspondence Chess Olympiad (1980-1982). In 1977, she was awarded the ICCF International Women Correspondence Master title.
