= Marianne Schröder (chess player) =

German chess player

Personal information
- Born: 7 August 1937
- Died: 15 January 1970 (aged 32)

Chess career
- Country: Germany; West Germany

Marianne Schröder (7 August 1937 – 15 January 1970), née Kulke, was a German chess player who six times won the West Berlin City Women's Chess Championship.

== Biography ==
In the 1950s and in the 1960s, Marianne Schröder was one of the leading chess players in the West Germany. She won six gold medals in West Berlin City Women's Chess Championships: 1958, 1959, 1961, 1962, 1963, and 1966. From 1956 to 1962 Marianne Schröder participated in West Germany Women's Chess Championship which achieved the best results in 1961 and 1962 when she ranked in 4th place.

Marianne Schröder played for West Germany in the Women's Chess Olympiad:

- In 1963, at first reserve board in the 2nd Chess Olympiad (women) in Split (+0, =1, -5).
