= Ottilie Stibaner =

German chess player (1908–1972)

Personal information
- Born: April 17, 1908 Frankfurt, Germany
- Died: May 23, 1972 (aged 64)

Chess career
- Country: Germany; West Germany

Ottilie Stibaner (17 April 1908 – 23 May 1972) was a German chess player. She is a winner of the West Germany Women's Chess Championship (1965).

== Biography ==
From the 1940s to the early 1970s, Ottilie Stibaner was one of the leading chess players in the West Germany. In 1942, she won silver medal in Germany Women's Chess Championship. Also she won seven medals in West Germany Women's Chess Championships: gold (1965), two silver (1960, 1968) and four bronzes (1947, 1949, 1957, 1971).

Ottile Stibaner was twelve-times winner of the Hesse Women's Chess Championship: 1947, 1948, 1949, 1952, 1955, 1957, 1960, 1961, 1963, 1964, 1965 and 1966. In West Germany Women's Chess Bundesliga Ottilie Stibaner played for chess club Schachfreunde Frankfurt 1921.

Ottilie Stibaner played for West Germany in the Women's Chess Olympiad:

- In 1966, at second board in the 3rd Chess Olympiad (women) in Oberhausen (+2, =2, -6).
