= Marta Poláková =

Czech chess player (1934–2023)

Personal information
- Born: 3 July 1934
- Died: 23 April 2023 (aged 88)

Chess career
- Country: Czechoslovakia; Czech Republic

Marta Poláková (née Sedláčková; 3 July 1934 – 23 April 2023) was a Czech chess player, Czechoslovak Women's Chess Championship medalist (1965).

== Biography ==
Marta Poláková was Brno chess player. She was one of the leading Czechoslovak women's chess players from 1955 to 1966. Marta Poláková was four time finalist of the Czechoslovak Women's Chess Championship: 1956 (10th place), 1961 (shared 4th-5th place), 1965 (shared 2nd-3rd place), 1966 (7th place). She was designer by profession.

Marta Poláková played for Czechoslovakia in the Women's Chess Olympiad:

- In 1966, at first reserve board in the 3rd Chess Olympiad (women) in Oberhausen (+0, =1, -1).

Poláková died on 23 April 2023, at the age of 88.
