= Eveline Nünchert =

German chess player (born 1943)

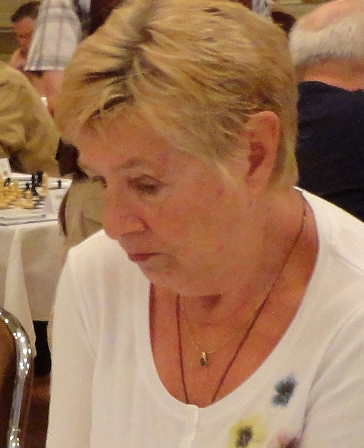
- Eveline Nünchert in 2014

Personal information
- Born: May 13, 1943 (age 83)

Chess career
- Country: East Germany; Germany
- Title: Woman FIDE Master (1990)
- Peak rating: 2237 (July 2000)

Eveline Nünchert (born 13 May 1943), née Kraatz, is a German chess player who holds the title of Woman FIDE Master (WFM, 1990). She is a winner the East Germany Women's Chess Championship (1973).

== Biography ==
In the 1960s and 1970s, Eveline Nünchert was one of the leading chess players in the East Germany. She won nine medals in East Germany Women's Chess Championships: gold (1973), three silver (1963, 1970, 1974) and five bronzes (1964, 1971, 1972, 1978, 1981). In 1994, she was third in the German Women's Blitz Championship. She also successfully participated in the German Senior's Chess Championships for women, who won the three times (2007, 2008, 2010), and one time took the third place (2014).

Eveline Nünchert played for East Germany in the Women's Chess Olympiad:

- In 1963, at first reserve board in the 2nd Chess Olympiad (women) in Split (+1, =3, -0) and won the team bronze medal.

In the German Chess Women's Bundesliga Eveline Nünchert represented Potsdam chess club USV Potsdam and in the season 1992/93 she showed the best result at her board with 9½ points in the 11 games. In 1990 Eveline Nünchert awarded the FIDE International Women Master (WFM) title.
