= Mirosława Litmanowicz =

Polish chess player (1928–2017)

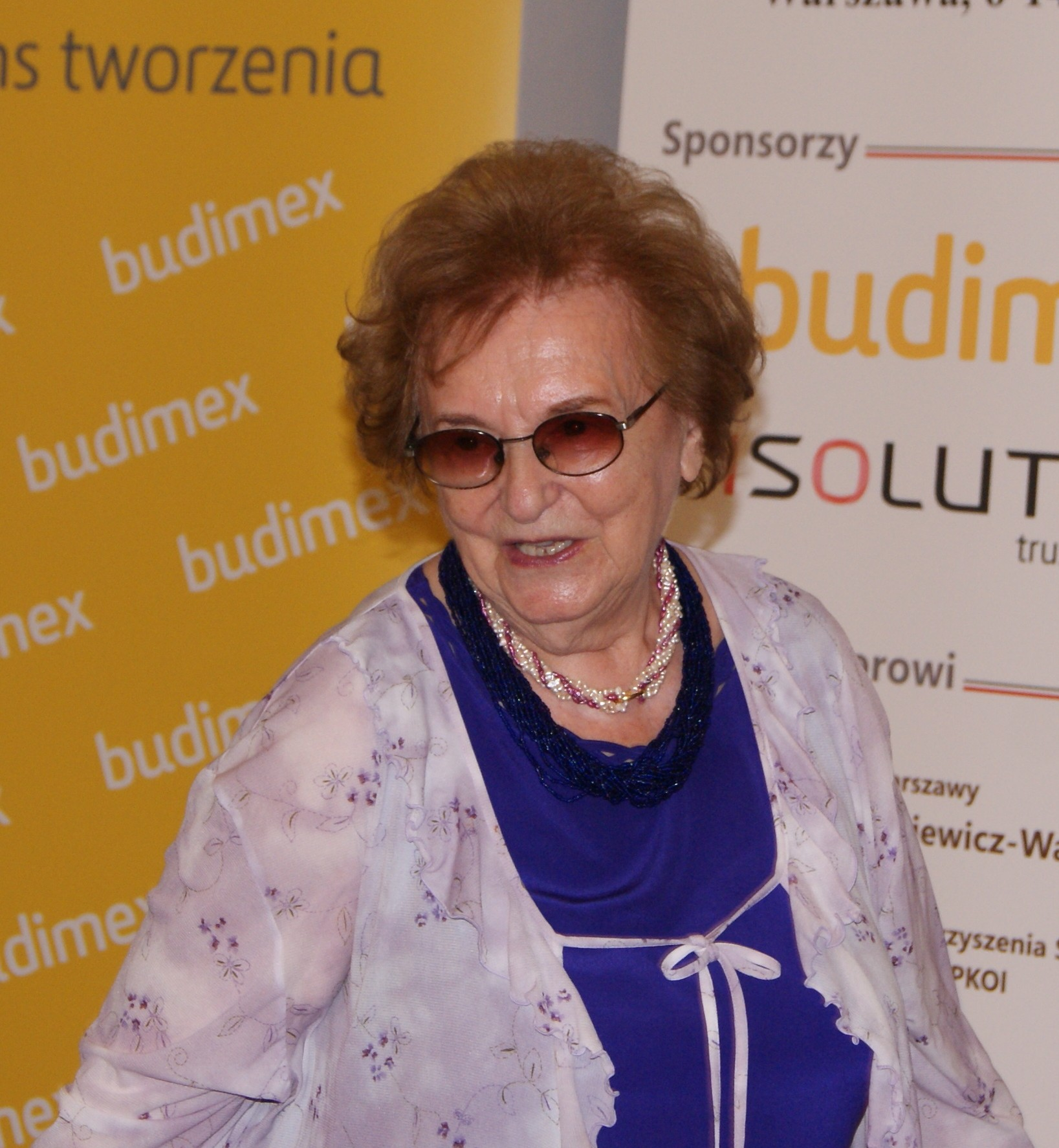
- Litmanowicz in 2011

Personal information
- Born: 6 September 1928 Warsaw, Poland
- Died: 18 August 2017 (aged 88)

Chess career
- Country: Poland
- Title: Woman International Master (1967)
- Peak rating: 2140 (January 1990)

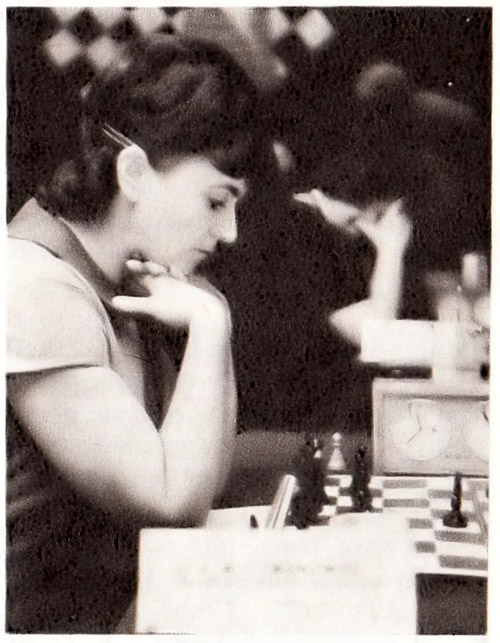

Mirosława Litmanowicz (née Kałęcka; 6 September 1928 – 18 August 2017) was a Polish chess player who won the Polish Women's Chess Championship in 1968. She became a FIDE Woman International Master in 1967.

== Chess career ==
Since the mid of 1950s to the start of 1970s, Litmanowicz was one of the leading Polish women chess player. From 1951 to 1972 she played 16 times in the Polish Women's Chess Championship's finals. Litmanowicz won ten medals: gold (1968), 5 silver (1957, 1958, 1964, 1969, 1972) and 2 bronze (1961, 1967). Also she won 7 gold medals (1953, 1956, 1960, 1961, 1964, 1967, 1972) in Polish Team Chess Championships.

She played for Poland in the Women's Chess Olympiads:

- In 1957, at second board in the 1st Women's Chess Olympiad in Emmen (+6, =1, -4),
- In 1963, won individual silver medal at first reserve board in the 2nd Women's Chess Olympiad in Split (+5, =3, -2),
- In 1966, at second board in the 3rd Women's Chess Olympiad in Oberhausen (+1, =0, -6),
- In 1969, at second board in the 4th Women's Chess Olympiad in Lublin (+5, =4, -2),
- In 1972, at first reserve board in the 5th Women's Chess Olympiad in Skopje (+3, =1, -2).

== Other ==
Litmanowicz appeared in many international tournaments, including four Women's World Chess Championship Zonal tournaments. She won or shared first place in international chess tournaments in Bled (1957), Portorož (1958), Piotrków Trybunalski (1969), Emmen (1970).

In February 1974, she ended her active chess player career and devoted herself to literary work. Her best-known books are chess manuals for children and young people.

== Personal life ==
She was married to Władysław Litmanowicz (1918-1992), a Polish journalist and chess player.
