= Mary Brannagan =

Irish chess player

Personal information
- Born: unknown

Chess career
- Country: Ireland

Mary Brannagan (also Mai Brannagan) is an Irish chess player, Irish Women's Chess Championship two-times silver medalist (1968, 1973).

== Biography ==
In the 1960s and 1970s, Brannagan was one of Ireland's leading female chess players. She won two silver medals in Irish Women's Chess Championships: 1968 and 1973 (both times after winner Dorren O'Siochrú).

Brannagan played for Ireland in the Women's Chess Olympiad:

- In 1969, at first board in the 4th Chess Olympiad (women) in Lublin (+0, =2, -7).

Brannagan was a former president of the Leinster Chess Union and the Branagan Cup is named after her. She was secretary (1963-1968) and president (1973-1974) of Rathmines Chess Club.
