= Merete Haahr =

Danish chess player (1924–2004)

Personal information
- Born: 18 November 1924
- Died: 17 March 2004 (aged 79)

Chess career
- Country: Denmark

Merete Haahr (18 November 1924 – 17 March 2004) was a Danish chess player, Danish Women's Chess Championship eight-times winner.

== Biography ==
From the early 1950s to the mid-1980s, Merete Haahr was one of the leading chess players in the Denmark. Eight times she won the Danish Women's Chess Championships: 1952, 1958, 1959, 1962, 1966, 1967, 1970 (after a play-off) and 1975. She sixth times participated in Women's World Chess Championship Zonal Tournaments: 1963, 1966, 1972, 1975, 1982 and 1987.

Merete Haahr played for Denmark in the Women's Chess Olympiads:

- In 1957, at second board in the 1st Chess Olympiad (women) in Emmen (+4, =1, -6),
- In 1969, at first board in the 4th Chess Olympiad (women) in Lublin (+3, =3, -5),
- In 1976, at second board in the 7th Chess Olympiad (women) in Haifa (+4, =3, -5),
- In 1978, at second board in the 8th Chess Olympiad (women) in Buenos Aires (+3, =7, -4),
- In 1980, at second board in the 9th Chess Olympiad (women) in Valletta (+4, =2, -4),
- In 1984, at first board in the 26th Chess Olympiad (women) in Thessaloniki (+2, =1, -8).

Merete Haahr played for Denmark in the Nordic Chess Cups:

- In 1971, at sixth board in the 2nd Nordic Chess Cup in Großenbrode (+3, =1, -1) and won team silver medal,
- In 1972, at sixth board in the 3rd Nordic Chess Cup in Großenbrode (+2, =1, -1) and won team silver medal,
- In 1973, at fifth board in the 4th Nordic Chess Cup in Ribe (+1, =1, -3) and won team gold medal.
