= Eva Aronson =

American chess player (1908–1999)

Personal information
- Full name: Eva Karolina Aronson
- Born: 2 March 1908 Linköping, Sweden
- Died: 8 January 1999 (aged 90) Morton Grove, Illinois, U.S.

Chess career
- Country: Sweden; United States
- Title: Woman International Master (1972)
- Peak rating: 2050 (January 1990)

Eva Karolina Aronson (née Hedén, 2 March 1908 – 8 January 1999) was a Sweden-born American chess player who held the title of Woman International Master (WIM, 1972). She was a winner the U.S. Women's Chess Championship (1972).

== Biography ==
From the 1950s to the 1970s, Aronson was one of the leading chess players in the United States. She won the United States Women's Chess Championship in 1972. Also she four times won United States Women's Open Chess Championship: 1953, 1961, 1969, and 1973.

In 1967, Aronson participated in the Women's World Chess Championship Candidates Tournament in Subotica and ranked 18th place. In 1973, she participated in the Women's World Chess Championship Interzonal Tournament in Menorca and shared 17th-18th place.

Aronson played for United States in the Women's Chess Olympiad:

- In 1966, at first reserve board in the 3rd Chess Olympiad (women) in Oberhausen (+2, =0, -4).

In 1972, Aronson was awarded the FIDE Woman International Master (WIM) title. She was married to chess player Ninus Aronson (1897-1984).
