= Elizabeth Shaughnessy =

Irish chess player

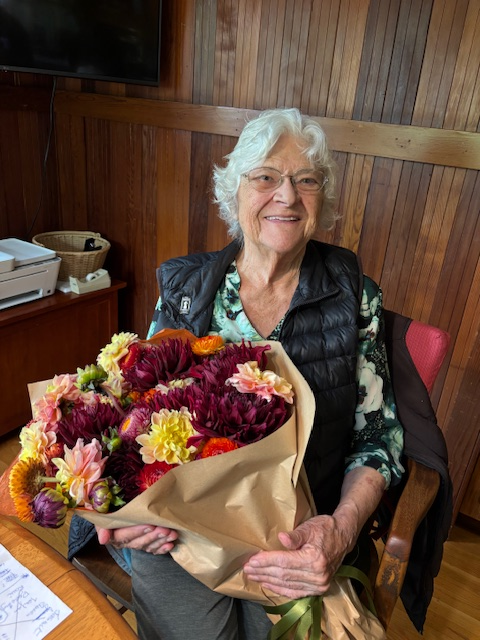
- Elizabeth Shaughnessy, Irish-American chess player and educator

Personal information
- Born: 1937 (age 88–89)

Chess career
- Country: Ireland (until 2023); United States (since 2023)
- Peak rating: 1651 (March 2024)

Elizabeth Shaughnessy (born 1937) is an Irish-American chess player and trainer who has regularly represented the national team at the Chess Olympiad. She has lived in Berkeley, California, United States for more than 30 years.

By profession, she is a trained architect, having completed a 6-year course at the National University of Ireland, University College Dublin. For several years she practiced architecture in Belgrade, London and Dublin, before marrying and moving to California.

Shaughnessy, a former Irish Women's Chess Champion, runs the Berkeley Chess School which teaches chess in schools throughout the Bay Area and holds chess camps in the summer. She was twice elected to the Berkeley School Board and is a pioneer in chess activism in California State Curriculum.
