= Caroline Vanderbeken =

Belgian chess player

Personal information
- Born: 1950 (age 75–76)

Chess career
- Country: Belgium

Caroline Vanderbeken (born 1950) is a Belgian chess player, Belgian Women's Chess Championship winner (1970).

== Biography ==
From the mid-1960s to the begin of 1970s, Caroline Vanderbeken was one of the leading chess players in Belgium. She won the Belgian Women's Chess Championships in 1970 after a play-off match against Louise Loeffler, 1½:½. Caroline Vanderbeken participated in traditional Belgium team matches against France in 1969, 1970 and 1971.

Caroline Vanderbeken played for Belgium in the Women's Chess Olympiad in 1969 at first board in the 4th Chess Olympiad (women) in Lublin (+1, =2, -11).
