= Danuta Samolewicz-Owczarek =

Polish chess player

Personal information
- Born: 19 December 1929
- Died: 2 February 2006 (aged 76)

Chess career
- Country: Poland

Danuta Samolewicz-Owczarek (19 December 1929 – 2 February 2006), née Samolewicz, was a Polish chess player who three-time won bronze medals in the Polish Women's Chess Championships (1962, 1965, 1966).

== Biography ==
In the 1960s, Danuta Samolewicz-Owczarek was one of the leading chess players in Poland. In 1954, she made her debut in the Polish Women's Chess Championship final in Gdańsk. From 1954 to 1967 she appeared in the final tournaments ten times and winning three bronze medals: in 1962 (Grudziądz), in 1965 (Łódź) and in 1966 (Koszalin). In 1967, she ranked 4th in the International Women's Chess tournament in Piotrków Trybunalski.

Danuta Samolewicz-Owczarek played for Poland in the Women's Chess Olympiad:

- In 1966, at first reserve board in the 3rd Chess Olympiad (women) in Oberhausen (+4, =0, -4).
