= Margareta Perevoznic =

Romanian chess player (1936–2021)

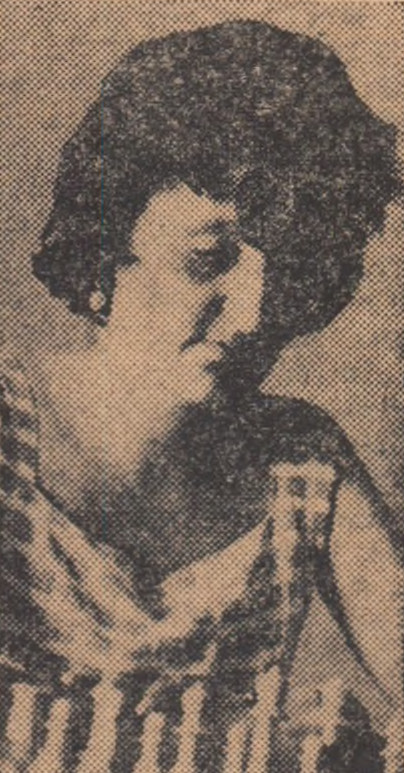

Personal information
- Born: 10 September 1936 Chernivtsi, Romania (now in Ukraine)
- Died: 15 December 2021 (aged 85)

Chess career
- Country: Romania
- Title: Woman International Master (1967)
- Peak rating: 2185 (January 1976)

Margareta Perevoznic (née Covali; 10 September 1936 – 15 December 2021) was a Romanian chess player who held the title of Woman International Master (WIM, 1967). She was the winner of the Romanian Women's Chess Championship in 1962.

== Biography ==
She was born in Chernivtsi which, until 1940, was part of Romania but now part of Ukraine. Her father was Romanian and her mother was Polish. After the Red Army occupied the Chernivtsi in 1940, Margaret was separated from the family and lived in a Soviet children's home, from where she was rescued by her grandmother and transferred to Romania. Margaret's father was sent to Siberia, where he died, but her mother returned home only after several years of imprisonment in Irkutsk.

She learned to play chess in the 1950s. In the 1960s she became one of the leading Romanian women's chess players. She won the whole set of medals in the Romanian Women's Chess Championship: gold (1962), silver (1961) and bronze (1960).

In 1967, she participated in Women's World Chess Championship Candidates Tournament in Subotica, where shared 11th-12th place.

Margareta Perevoznic played for Romania in the Women's Chess Olympiads:

- In 1963, at first reserve board in the 2nd Chess Olympiad (women) in Split (+1, =1, -3),
- In 1966, at first reserve board in the 3rd Chess Olympiad (women) in Oberhausen (+4, =2, -1) and won the team silver medal.

In 1967, she was awarded the FIDE Woman International Master (WIM) title. She was also known as a chess trainer and correspondence chess player. In 1979, along with the Romanian team, she reached the 6th place in World Correspondence Chess Olympiad.
