= Władysław Litmanowicz =

Polish chess player

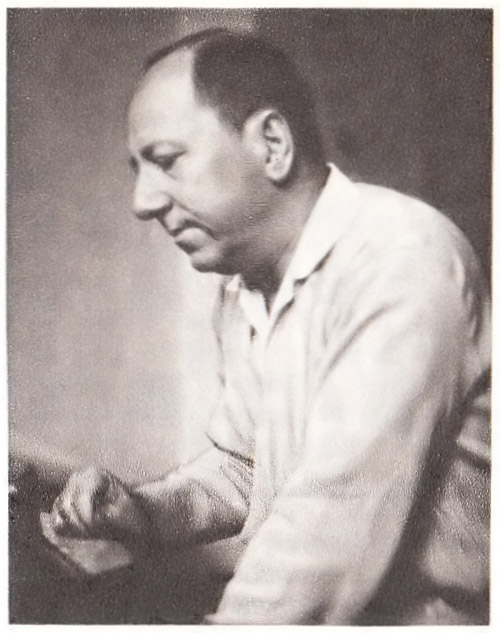

Personal information
- Born: 20 February 1918 Wrocław, Poland
- Died: 31 March 1992 (aged 74)

Chess career
- Country: Poland
- Title: International Arbiter (1968)

Władysław Litmanowicz (20 February 1918 – 31 March 1992) was a Polish chess player and FIDE International Arbiter (1968).

== Biography ==
In 1939 Władysław Litmanowicz obtained the Master's degree at Faculty of Law and Administration at the University of Warsaw. In June 1941 he was deported in deeply Soviet Union. He worked as an accountant in kolkhoz and in Kagalnik near Azov (1941). In August 1941 he was mobilized to Red Army and directed to the monthly officer school. After graduating from school, he served as an officer in the Red Army units. August 11, 1944 he transferred to Polish People's Army.

In 1947–1952 Władysław Litmanowicz was a judge of the Military District Court in Kraków, Kielce and Warsaw. As a judge, he participated in Stalinist trials, including in the trial of Tadeusz Klukowski and Jerzy Kurzępa, sentenced to death on October 1, 1952. Władysław Litmanowicz also sentenced to death Edmund Bukowski a lieutenant of the Armia Krajowa, whose body was only identified in 2013 in Headquarters on Łączka. As the chairman of the judicial panel, Władysław Litmanowicz participated in the issuing of one death sentence for independence activities, the sentence was not carried out.

In 1952–1955 Władysław Litmanowicz was an officer commissioned by the adviser to the head Main Political Management of the Polish Army. He ended his career in the Polish People's Army in 1955 as major and transferred to the reserve.

In the post-war period Władysław Litmanowicz was one of the leading Polish chess players. From 1948 to 1955 he appeared five times in the Polish Chess Championship finals. His best result being obtained in 1951 in Łódź, where he took the 8th place. From 1951, he was the Vice President of Sport for the Chess Section Main Committee of Physical Culture, playing a major role in its activities. He owed his organizational position to representation. In 1952 he appeared in an international tournament in Międzyzdroje and represented Poland at 10th Chess Olympiad in Helsinki (scored 0.5 point in 4 games).

From the beginning of the 1950s, Władysław Litmanowicz took up journalistic and journalistic work, devoting himself entirely to it in the middle of the decade after retiring from a competitive game. In the years 1950–1984 he was the editor-in-chief without interruption in monthly journal Szachy. Also from 1950 he ran a chess department in Trybuna Ludu. Until the middle of 1980s, he edited chess columns in many magazines, such as: Express Wieczorny, Perspektywy, Żołnierz Polski, Żołnierz Wolności, Świat Młodych and others. In the years 1956–1970 he held many positions in Polish Chess Federation, including chairman of the trainer board, vice president for sport and general secretary. In 1982 Władysław Litmanowicz was awarded the title of honorary member of Polish Chess Federation. From 1964 he was the Polish Chess Federation delegate in International Chess Federation (FIDE), then in 1970-1972 Władysław Litmanowicz was a member of the FIDE Commission, and from 1978 to 1982 its secretary. In 1968 he received the title of FIDE International Arbitr. In his chess arbitr career, he was an arbitrator on, among others at three Chess Olympiad (1980, 1984, 1986), World Team Chess Championship (1985) and at many international high-level chess tournaments.

For his journalistic and journalistic achievements, Władysław Litmanowicz was awarded the Order of Polonia Restituta Knight's Cross in 1973 and the Officer's Cross in 1982.

Władysław Litmanowicz was buried in Northern Municipal Cemetery in Warsaw.

== Private life ==
The wife of Władysław Litmanowicz was Mirosława Litmanowicz, in the 1960s a leading Polish female chess player, FIDE Woman International Master (1967)., Polish Women's Chess Championship winner (1968) and a five-time Chess Olympiad participant (1957–1972).
