= Ruth Donnelly (chess player) =

American chess player

Personal information
- Born: January 19, 1929
- Died: April 4, 2009 (aged 80)

Chess career
- Country: United States
- Peak rating: 2065 (January 1988)

Ruth Donnelly (19 January 1929 – 4 April 2009) was an American chess player.

== Career ==
From 1972 to 1989, she participated in nine United States Women's Chess Championship, achieving her strongest finish in 1972 winning 3rd place. In 1973, she participated in the Women's World Chess Championship Interzonal Tournament in Menorca and shared 17th-18th place with Linda Maddern. Twice in 1992 and 1993 she won the bronze medal at the World Senior Women's Chess Championships.
