= 2017 in chess =

This article details the year of 2017 with respect to the game of chess. Major chess-related events that took place in 2017 include the Women's World Chess Championship 2017 knockout tournament, the Chess World Cup, the FIDE Grand Prix Series, and the abolishing of the consecutiveness requirement within the fivefold repetition rule.

== 2017 tournaments ==
This is a list of significant 2017 chess tournaments:

Tournament	System	Dates	Players (2700+)	Winner	Runner-up	Third
Tata Steel Chess Tournament	Round robin	13–29 Jan	14 (13)	(United States) Wesley So	(Norway) Magnus Carlsen	(India) Baskaran Adhiban
Tradewise Gibraltar Chess Festival	Swiss	24 Jan – 2 Feb	255 (12)	(United States) Hikaru Nakamura	(Spain) David Antón Guijarro	(China) Yu Yangyi
FIDE Grand Prix 2017 (Sharjah)	Swiss	18–27 Feb	18 (13)	(Russia) Alexander Grischuk	(France) Maxime Vachier-Lagrave	(Azerbaijan) Shakhriyar Mamedyarov
Zurich Chess Challenge	Round robin	12–27 Apr	8 (6)	(United States) Hikaru Nakamura	(Russia) Ian Nepomniachtchi	(India) Viswanathan Anand
Women's World Chess Championship 2017	Knockout	10 Feb – 5 Mar	64	(China) Tan Zhongyi	(Ukraine) Anna Muzychuk	(Russia) Alexandra Kosteniuk (India) Harika Dronavalli
U.S. Chess Championship	Round robin	28 Mar – 10 Apr	12 (3)	(United States) Wesley So	(United States) Alexander Onischuk	(United States) Fabiano Caruana
Women's European Individual Chess Championship (Riga)	Swiss	11 Apr – 22 Apr	144	(Georgia (country)) Nana Dzagnidze	(Russia) Aleksandra Goryachkina	(Russia) Alisa Galliamova
FIDE Grand Prix 2017 (Moscow)	Swiss	12–21 May	18 (14)	(China) Ding Liren	(Azerbaijan) Shakhriyar Mamedyarov	(China) Hou Yifan
European Individual Chess Championship	Swiss	29 May – 10 Jun	402 (9)	(Russia) Maxim Matlakov	(Georgia (country)) Baadur Jobava	(Russia) Vladimir Fedoseev
Norway Chess 2017	Round robin	5–17 Jun	10 (10)	(Armenia) Levon Aronian	(United States) Hikaru Nakamura	(Russia) Vladimir Kramnik
World Team Chess Championship	Team	16–28 Jun	10 teams	China	Russia	Poland
FIDE Grand Prix 2017 (Geneva)	Swiss	6–15 Jul	18 (14)	(Azerbaijan) Teimour Radjabov	(Russia) Ian Nepomniachtchi	(Russia) Alexander Grischuk
Dortmund Sparkassen Chess Meeting 2017	Round robin	15–23 Jul	8 (5)	(Poland) Radoslaw Wojtaszek	(Russia) Vladimir Fedoseev	(France) Maxime Vachier-Lagrave
Sinquefield Cup 2017	Round robin	2–11 Aug	10 (10)	(France) Maxime Vachier-Lagrave	(Norway) Magnus Carlsen	(India) Viswanathan Anand
Chess World Cup 2017	Knockout	3–27 Sep	128 (40)	(Armenia) Levon Aronian	(China) Ding Liren	(United States) Wesley So (France) Maxime Vachier-Lagrave
Isle of Man International Masters 2017	Swiss	23 Sep – 1 Oct	161 (13)	(Norway) Magnus Carlsen	(India) Viswanathan Anand	(United States) Hikaru Nakamura
FIDE Grand Prix 2017 (Palma de Mallorca)	Swiss	16–27 Nov	18 (14)	(Russia) Dmitry Jakovenko	(Armenia) Levon Aronian	(Azerbaijan) Teimour Radjabov
London Chess Classic 2017	Round robin	30 Nov – 11 Dec	10 (10)	(United States) Fabiano Caruana	(Russia) Ian Nepomniachtchi	(Norway) Magnus Carlsen
2017 World Rapid Chess Championship	Swiss	26–28 Dec	134 (32)	(India) Viswanathan Anand	(Russia) Vladimir Fedoseev	(Russia) Ian Nepomniachtchi
2017 World Blitz Chess Championship	Swiss	29–30 Dec	138 (25)	(Norway) Magnus Carlsen	(Russia) Sergey Karjakin	(India) Viswanathan Anand

== Deaths ==
- Hans Berliner (27 January 1929 – 13 January 2017), American International Correspondence Chess Grandmaster and World Correspondence Chess Champion (1965–1968).
- Arthur Bisguier (8 October 1929 – 5 April 2017), American Grandmaster, United States Champion in 1954, two-time US Junior Champion, three-time US Open Champion and five-time Olympian.
- Enver Bukić (2 December 1937 – 22 February 2017), Slovenian Grandmaster
- Algimantas Butnorius (20 February 1946 – 30 October 2017), Lithuanian Grandmaster and 2007 World Senior Champion.
- Cristina Adela Foișor (7 June 1967 – 22 January 2017), Romanian International Master and Woman Grandmaster, five-time Women's Romanian Champion and fourteen-time Olympian.
- Reinhart Fuchs (28 September 1934 – 16 December 2017), German International Master and six-time Olympian on the East German team.
- Josef Kupper (10 March 1932 – 5 June 2017), Swiss International Master, three-time Swiss Champion and four-time Olympian winning the individual silver in 1954.
- Viktor Kupreichik (3 July 1949 – 22 May 2017), Soviet and Belarusian Grandmaster, two-time Belarusian Champion.
- Hillar Kärner (27 July 1935 – 19 February 2017), Estonian International Master and seven-time Estonian Champion.
- Mirosława Litmanowicz (6 September 1928 – 18 August 2017), Polish Woman International Master, five-time Olympian, and Polish Women's Champion in 1968.
- William Lombardy (4 December 1937 – 13 October 2017), American Grandmaster, seven-time Olympian, World Junior Champion in 1957.
- Vladimir Malaniuk (21 July 1957 – 2 July 2017), Soviet and Ukrainian Grandmaster and three-time Ukrainian Champion.
- Nikolay Minev (8 November 1931 – 10 March 2017), Bulgarian International Master and chess writer.
- Corvin Radovici (19 December 1931 – 17 August 2017), Romanian International Master and three-time Olympian.
- Zoltan Sarosy (23 August 1906 – 19 June 2017), Hungarian and Canadian chess player, three-time Canadian Correspondence Champion.
- Samuel Schweber (16 July 1936 – 1 January 2017), Argentine International Master and five-time Olympian.
- Raymond Smullyan (25 May 1919 – 6 February 2017), American logician and creator of retrograde analysis chess problems.
- Vadim Teplitsky (18 June 1927 – 30 April 2017), Soviet and Israeli chess historian.
- Larissa Volpert (30 March 1926 – 1 October 2017), Soviet Woman Grandmaster and three-time Soviet Women's Champion.
- Valeri Yandemirov (11 February 1963 – 16 November 2017), Russian Grandmaster.
- Tatiana Zatulovskaya (8 December 1935 – 2 July 2017), Soviet, Russian and Israeli Woman Grandmaster, three-time Soviet Women's Champion, two-time Olympian and 1993 Women's World Senior Champion.
- Ljubica Živković (25 September 1936 – 13 June 2017), Yugoslav Woman International Master and 1959 Yugoslav Women's Champion.
