= Women's World Chess Championship 1981 =

The 1981 Women's World Chess Championship was won by Maia Chiburdanidze, who successfully defended her title against challenger Nana Alexandria after a closely fought match, which ended in an 8-8 tie.

== 1979 Interzonals ==
Like the previous one, this championship cycle contained two Interzonal tournaments, held in Rio de Janeiro in September and Alicante in October 1979, featuring the best players from each FIDE zone. A total of 35 players took part, with the top three from Rio (17 players) and the top four from Alicante (18 players) qualifying for the Candidates' matches.

Ioseliani won convincingly in Rio, 2½ points ahead of Veroci-Petronic and Alexandria.

In Alicante, Lematschko and Akhmilovskaya shared first place, well ahead of Gurieli and Litinskaya. However, Lematschko subsequently defected from socialist Bulgaria and was unable to take part in the Candidates' matches, so her place was given to Fischdick as fourth-placed from the Rio Interzonal (on tie-breaks). Lematschko later settled in Switzerland and reached the Candidates' matches again in the following cycle, representing her new country.

1979 Women's Interzonal, Rio de Janeiro
	Player	1	2	3	4	5	6	7	8	9	10	11	12	13	14	15	16	17	Points	Tie break
1	Nana Ioseliani (Soviet Union)	-	½	1	1	½	1	1	1	1	1	1	1	1	1	½	1	1	14½	
2	Zsuzsa Veroci-Petronic (Hungary)	½	-	1	½	½	½	½	½	1	½	1	1	1	1	1	½	1	12	
3	Nana Alexandria (Soviet Union)	0	0	-	½	½	1	0	1	1	0	1	1	1	1	1	1	1	11	
4	Gisela Fischdick (West Germany)	0	½	½	-	½	1	1	½	1	1	½	0	1	½	½	1	1	10½	74.50
5	Elisabeta Polihroniade (Romania)	½	½	½	½	-	½	1	½	½	½	½	0	1	1	1	1	1	10½	73.50
6	Valentina Kozlovskaya (Soviet Union)	0	½	0	0	½	-	1	1	½	1	1	1	0	½	½	1	1	9½	63.25
7	Milunka Lazarević (Yugoslavia)	0	½	1	0	0	0	-	0	1	1	1	1	1	0	1	1	1	9½	60.50
8	Tatiana Zatulovskaya (Soviet Union)	0	½	0	½	½	0	1	-	½	0	0	1	1	1	1	1	1	9	55.50
9	Kveta Eretova (Czechoslovakia)	0	0	0	0	½	½	0	½	-	1	1	1	1	1	1	½	1	9	54.25
10	Borislava Borisova (Sweden)	0	½	1	0	½	0	0	1	0	-	1	½	0	½	1	1	1	8	
11	Jana Miles (England)	0	0	0	½	½	0	0	1	0	0	-	1	½	1	1	1	1	7½	
12	Rachel Crotto (USA)	0	0	0	1	1	0	0	0	0	½	0	-	1	½	½	1	1	6½	38.50
13	Rohini Khadilkar (India)	0	0	0	0	0	1	0	0	0	1	½	0	-	1	1	1	1	6½	33.25
14	Barbara Hund (West Germany)	0	0	0	½	0	½	1	0	0	½	0	½	0	-	1	1	1	6	
15	Edith Soppe (Argentina)	½	0	0	½	0	½	0	0	0	0	0	½	0	0	-	1	1	4	
16	Ruth Volgl Cardoso (Brazil)	0	½	0	0	0	0	0	0	½	0	0	0	0	0	0	-	½	1½	
17	Ana Luisa Carvajal (Cuba)	0	0	0	0	0	0	0	0	0	0	0	0	0	0	0	½	-	½	

1979 Women's Interzonal, Alicante
	Player	1	2	3	4	5	6	7	8	9	10	11	12	13	14	15	16	17	18	Points	Tie break
1	Tatjana Lematschko (Bulgaria)	-	½	1	1	1	½	1	1	0	1	½	½	½	1	1	1	1	1	13½	107.75
2	Elena Akhmilovskaya (Soviet Union)	½	-	½	1	0	1	1	1	1	1	0	1	½	1	1	1	1	1	13½	104.50
3	Nino Gurieli (Soviet Union)	0	½	-	0	0	1	½	1	1	½	½	1	1	1	1	1	1	1	12	
4	Marta Litinskaya (Soviet Union)	0	0	1	-	0	0	0	1	½	1	1	1	1	1	1	1	1	1	11½	
5	Diane Savereide (USA)	0	1	1	1	-	½	0	0	0	1	1	½	½	1	1	½	1	1	11	
6	Elena Fatalibekova (Soviet Union)	½	0	0	1	½	-	0	0	1	0	½	1	1	1	1	1	1	1	10½	
7	Mária Ivánka (Hungary)	0	0	½	1	1	1	-	1	1	½	½	1	½	0	0	0	1	1	10	
8	Maaja Ranniku (Soviet Union)	0	0	0	0	1	1	0	-	½	1	½	½	0	½	1	1	1	1	9	
9	Nieves García (Spain)	1	0	0	½	1	0	0	½	-	1	1	0	½	½	0	½	1	1	8½	65.25
10	Gertrude Baumstark (Romania)	0	0	½	0	0	1	½	0	0	-	½	0	1	1	1	1	1	1	8½	54.50
11	Alexandra van der Mije (Netherlands)	½	1	½	0	0	½	½	½	0	½	-	½	½	0	1	½	½	1	8	64.75
12	Asela De Armas (Cuba)	½	0	0	0	½	0	0	½	1	1	½	-	1	1	0	1	½	½	8	58.25
13	Gordana Marković (Yugoslavia)	½	½	0	0	½	0	½	1	½	0	½	0	-	½	1	0	1	0	6½	53.00
14	Olivera Prokopovic (Yugoslavia)	0	0	0	0	0	0	1	½	½	0	1	0	½	-	0	1	1	1	6½	40.00
15	Nava Shterenberg (Canada)	0	0	0	0	0	0	1	0	1	0	0	1	0	1	-	0	1	1	6	
16	Berna Carrasco (Chile)	0	0	0	0	½	0	1	0	½	0	½	0	1	0	1	-	0	½	5	
17	Narelle Kellner (Australia)	0	0	0	0	0	0	0	0	0	0	½	½	0	0	0	1	-	½	2½	14.25
18	Miyoko Watai (Japan)	0	0	0	0	0	0	0	0	0	0	0	½	1	0	0	½	½	-	2½	14.25

== 1980–81 Candidates' matches ==
The seven qualifiers from the two Interzonals were joined by ex-champion Gaprindashvili, who had been seeded into the tournament.

These eight players contested a knock-out series of matches. The semifinal Ioseliani-Gaprindashvili ended 7-7; in the end, Ioseliani won the lucky draw and advanced to the final. Here she lost to Alexandria, who earned the right to challenge the reigning champion for the second time (after 1975).

Quarter-finals
Kislovodsk, Mar 1980
(Soviet Union) Nana Alexandria	5½
(Soviet Union) Elena Akhmilovskaya	3½
Baden-Baden, Mar 1980
(Soviet Union) Marta Litinskaya	4½
(West Germany) Gisela Fischdick	3½
Donji Milanovac, Mar 1980
(Soviet Union) Nana Ioseliani	6
(Hungary) Zsuzsa Veroci-Petronic	3
Tbilisi, Mar 1980
(Soviet Union) Nona Gaprindashvili	6
(Soviet Union) Nino Gurieli	3

Semi-finals
Vilnius, Sep 1980
(Soviet Union) Nana Alexandria	7
(Soviet Union) Marta Litinskaya	5
Tbilisi, Sep 1980
(Soviet Union) Nana Ioseliani	7
(Soviet Union) Nona Gaprindashvili	7

Final
Tbilisi, Jan 1981
(Soviet Union) Nana Alexandria	6½
(Soviet Union) Nana Ioseliani	2½

== 1981 Championship Match ==
The championship match was played in Borjomi and Tbilisi in 1981. A tough match went the full 16 games and ended in an 8-8 tie, with champion Chiburdanidze thus retaining her title.

Women's World Championship Match 1981
	1	2	3	4	5	6	7	8	9	10	11	12	13	14	15	16	Total
Maia Chiburdanidze (Soviet Union)	½	½	½	½	0	1	1	½	1	0	0	½	½	½	1	0	8
Nana Alexandria (Soviet Union)	½	½	½	½	1	0	0	½	0	1	1	½	½	½	0	1	8
