= Women's World Chess Championship 1965 =

The 1965 Women's World Chess Championship was won by Nona Gaprindashvili, who successfully defended her title against challenger Alla Kushnir in what was to be the first of three consecutive title matches between the two strongest female players of their time.

== 1964 Candidates Tournament ==
The Candidates Tournament was held in Sukhumi in September and October 1964. Three players were tied for first place, but Kushnir won the playoff in Moscow in December 1964 and earned the right to challenge the reigning champion Gaprindashvili.

1964 Women's Candidates Tournament
	Player	1	2	3	4	5	6	7	8	9	10	11	12	13	14	15	16	17	18	Points	Tie break
1	Milunka Lazarević (Yugoslavia)	-	1	1	½	½	1	0	½	1	1	½	1	1	0	1	1	½	1	12½	102.00
2	Alla Kushnir (Soviet Union)	0	-	0	1	½	1	1	1	0	½	1	1	½	1	1	1	1	1	12½	93.50
3	Tatiana Zatulovskaya (Soviet Union)	0	1	-	0	½	1	½	0	1	1	1	1	½	1	1	1	1	1	12½	93.25
4	Kira Zvorykina (Soviet Union)	½	0	1	-	½	1	½	1	1	1	0	1	0	1	1	½	0	1	11	91.25
5	Katarina Jovanović-Blagojević (Yugoslavia)	½	½	½	½	-	½	0	½	½	½	1	1	1	1	½	½	1	1	11	82.50
6	Maaja Ranniku (Soviet Union)	0	0	0	0	½	-	½	1	½	0	1	1	1	1	1	1	1	1	10½	
7	Valentina Borisenko (Soviet Union)	1	0	½	½	1	½	-	1	0	0	½	0	½	1	1	½	1	1	10	78.75
8	Henrijeta Konarkowska (Poland)	½	0	1	0	½	0	0	-	1	1	1	1	1	0	1	½	½	1	10	75.75
9	Verica Nedeljković (Yugoslavia)	0	1	0	0	½	½	1	0	-	1	1	0	1	½	1	0	1	½	9	
10	Kveta Eretova (Czechoslovakia)	0	½	0	0	½	1	1	0	0	-	0	1	½	1	½	1	½	1	8½	
11	Elisabeth Bykova (Soviet Union)	½	0	0	1	0	0	½	0	0	1	-	1	½	½	0	1	1	1	8	
12	Lisa Lane (USA)	0	0	0	0	0	0	1	0	1	0	0	-	1	½	1	½	1	1	7	
13	Eva Ladanyike-Karakas (Hungary)	0	½	½	1	0	0	½	0	0	½	½	0	-	½	0	½	1	1	6½	48.00
14	Gisela Kahn Gresser (USA)	1	0	0	0	0	0	0	1	½	0	½	½	½	-	0	½	1	1	6½	45.75
15	Margareta Teodorescu (Romania)	0	0	0	0	½	0	0	0	0	½	1	0	1	1	-	½	1	1	6½	38.75
16	Antonia Ivanova (Bulgaria)	0	0	0	½	½	0	½	½	1	0	0	½	½	½	½	-	½	½	6	
17	Tumenbayar Tsend (Mongolia)	½	0	0	1	0	0	0	½	0	½	0	0	0	0	0	½	-	1	4	
18	Celia Baudot de Moschini (Argentina)	0	0	0	0	0	0	0	0	½	0	0	0	0	0	0	½	0	-	1	

1964 Women's Candidates Playoff Tournament
	Player	1	2	3	Total
1	Alla Kushnir (Soviet Union)	-	0 1	1 ½	2½
2	Milunka Lazarević (Yugoslavia)	1 0	-	1 0	2
3	Tatiana Zatulovskaya (Soviet Union)	0 ½	0 1	-	1½

== 1965 Championship Match ==
The championship match was played in Riga in 1965. Despite valiant opposition from Kushnir, Gaprindashvili's victory was never really in doubt.

Women's World Championship Match 1965
	1	2	3	4	5	6	7	8	9	10	11	12	13	Total
Alla Kushnir (Soviet Union)	0	1	½	0	0	½	0	0	½	1	0	1	0	4½
Nona Gaprindashvili (Soviet Union)	1	0	½	1	1	½	1	1	½	0	1	0	1	8½
