= Swapnil Dhopade =

Indian chess grandmaster (born 1990)

Personal information
- Born: 5 October 1990 (age 35) Nagpur, India

Chess career
- Country: India
- Title: Grandmaster (2016)
- FIDE rating: 2419 (July 2026)
- Peak rating: 2545 (April 2017)

Swapnil Dhopade (born 5 October 1990) is an Indian chess grandmaster. In 2016, he became the first grandmaster from the Vidarbha region and the fifth from Maharashtra. In 2017, he shared 3rd place with a score of 6.5/9 at the Isle of Man International Masters tournament. In 2019, he was the coach for the Indian women's team at the World Team Chess Championship. His peak classical rating is 2545.
