= Women's World Chess Championship 1972 =

The 1972 Women's World Chess Championship was won by Nona Gaprindashvili, who successfully defended her title against challenger Alla Kushnir. This was the third (and last) consecutive title match between the two strongest female players of their time.

== 1971 Interzonal Tournament ==
For the first time, the women's championship cycle consisted of all the same stages as the open cycle. An Interzonal tournament was held in Ohrid in May 1971, featuring the best players from each FIDE zone, for a total of 18 participants. The top three would qualify for the Candidates Tournament.

1971 Women's Interzonal Tournament
	Player	1	2	3	4	5	6	7	8	9	10	11	12	13	14	15	16	17	18	Points	Tie break
1	Nana Alexandria (Soviet Union)	-	0	½	1	1	½	½	1	½	0	1	1	1	1	1	1	1	1	13	
2	Milunka Lazarević (Yugoslavia)	1	-	0	½	0	1	0	½	1	1	½	1	1	½	1	1	1	1	12	91.75
3	Tatiana Zatulovskaya (Soviet Union)	½	1	-	0	½	½	½	½	½	½	1	1	½	1	1	1	1	1	12	91.25
4	Natalia Konopleva (Soviet Union)	0	½	1	-	1	½	1	0	½	1	0	½	1	1	1	½	½	1	11	87.50
5	Mária Ivánka (Hungary)	0	1	½	0	-	½	½	1	½	0	1	½	½	1	1	1	1	1	11	82.00
6	Valentina Kozlovskaya (Soviet Union)	½	0	½	½	½	-	½	½	1	1	½	1	1	1	½	0	1	½	10½	
7	Krystyna Hołuj-Radzikowska (Poland)	½	1	½	0	½	½	-	½	1	½	0	½	½	½	0	1	1	1	9½	77.50
8	Elisabeta Polihroniade (Romania)	0	½	½	1	0	½	½	-	½	1	1	½	½	½	½	½	½	1	9½	75.50
9	Katarina Jovanović-Blagojević (Yugoslavia)	½	0	½	½	½	0	0	½	-	1	½	1	½	½	1	1	½	½	9	
10	Olga Rubtsova (Soviet Union)	1	0	½	0	1	0	½	0	0	-	1	0	1	½	0	1	1	1	8½	
11	Ružica Jovanović (Yugoslavia)	0	½	0	1	0	½	1	0	½	0	-	½	½	1	1	½	½	0	7½	59.25
12	Tanja Belamarić (Yugoslavia)	0	0	0	½	½	0	½	½	0	1	½	-	½	½	1	1	½	½	7½	54.00
13	Tereza Štadler (Yugoslavia)	0	0	½	0	½	0	½	½	½	0	½	½	-	½	½	1	½	½	6½	
14	Corry Vreeken (Netherlands)	0	½	0	0	0	0	½	½	½	½	0	½	½	-	1	½	0	½	5½	41.50
15	Mona May Karff (USA)	0	0	0	0	0	½	1	½	0	1	0	0	½	0	-	½	½	1	5½	40.75
16	Gertrude Baumstark (Romania)	0	0	0	½	0	1	0	½	0	0	½	0	0	½	½	-	½	1	5	37.00
17	Ruth Volgl Cardoso (Brazil)	0	0	0	½	0	0	0	½	½	0	½	½	½	1	½	½	-	0	5	36.25
18	Gisela Kahn Gresser (USA)	0	0	0	0	0	½	0	0	½	0	1	½	½	½	0	0	1	-	4½	

== 1971 Candidates matches ==
The top three from the Interzonal were joined by Kushnir, the loser of the last championship match. These four players contested a knock-out series of matches to determine the challenger. Kushnir again prevailed, earning the right to another shot at Gaprindashvili's title.

Semifinals
Minsk, Aug-Sep 1971
(Soviet Union) Alla Kushnir	5½
(Soviet Union) Tatiana Zatulovskaya	4½
Bladel, Aug-Sep 1971
(Soviet Union) Nana Alexandria	5½
(Socialist Federal Republic of Yugoslavia) Milunka Lazarević	4½

Final
Kislovodsk, Nov-Dec 1971
(Soviet Union) Alla Kushnir	6½
(Soviet Union) Nana Alexandria	2½

== 1972 Championship Match ==
The championship match was played in Riga in 1972. This time, Kushnir came closer than ever to beating Gaprindashvili, but with draws in the last two games the defending champion managed to hang onto her title by one point.

Women's World Championship Match 1972
	1	2	3	4	5	6	7	8	9	10	11	12	13	14	15	16	Total
Nona Gaprindashvili (Soviet Union)	1	1	0	1	½	1	½	0	1	½	0	½	½	0	½	½	8½
Alla Kushnir (Soviet Union)	0	0	1	0	½	0	½	1	0	½	1	½	½	1	½	½	7½
