= Ana Luisa Carvajal Gamoneda =

Cuban chess player

Personal information
- Born: 9 March 1963 (age 63)

Chess career
- Country: Cuba
- Title: Woman International Master (1978)
- Peak rating: 2183 (January 2005)

Ana Luisa Carvajal Gamoneda (born 9 March 1963) is a Cuban chess player who holds the FIDE title of Woman International Master (WIM).

== Biography ==
In 1978, she won the second place in FIDE Zonal Tournament (the first place won her compatriot Asela de Armas Pérez) and was awarded the FIDE Woman International Master (WIM) title. In 1979, Ana Luisa Carvajal Gamoneda participated at Interzonal Tournament in Rio de Janeiro and ranked 17th place.
