= Gertrude Baumstark =

Romanian-German chess player (1941–2020)

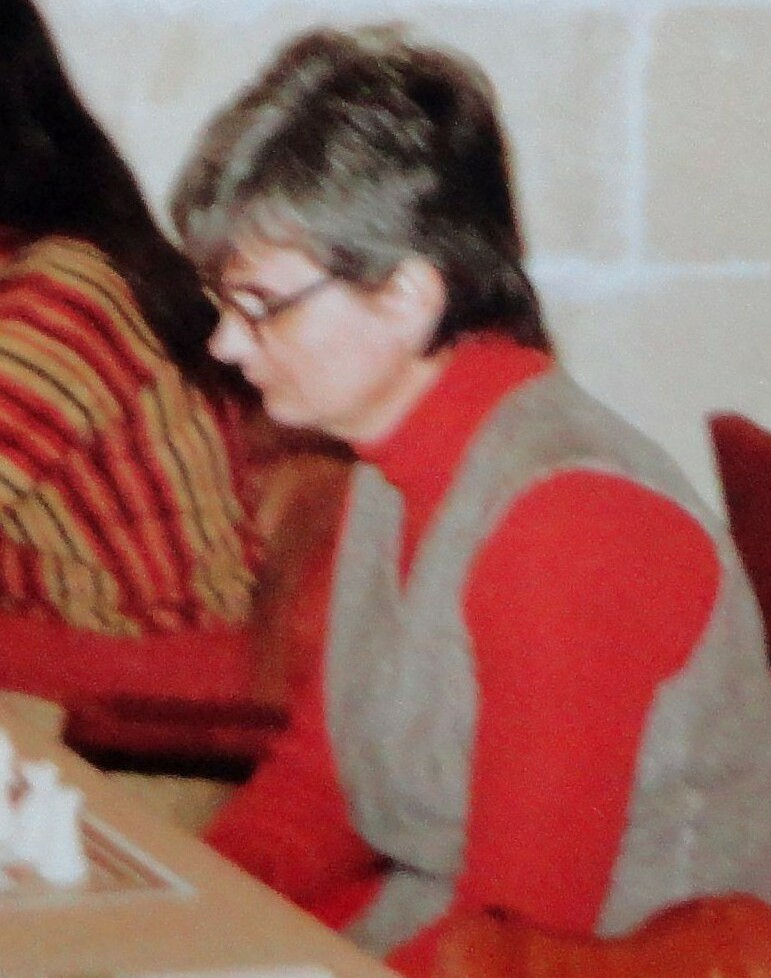
- Baumstarka in 1980

Personal information
- Born: 21 May 1941 Timișoara, Romania
- Died: 28 April 2020 (aged 78) Munich, Germany

Chess career
- Country: Romania; Germany
- Title: Woman International Master (1970)
- Peak rating: 2245 (January 1990)

Gertrude Baumstark (21 May 1941 - 28 April 2020), was a Romanian and German chess player who holds the title of Woman International Master (WIM, 1970). She is a two-time winner of the Romanian Women's Chess Championship (1967, 1981).

== Biography ==
From the mid-1960s, Gertrude Baumstark was one of the leading Romanian women's chess players. In Romanian Women's Chess Championships have won the nine medals: two gold (1967, 1981), six silver (1969, 1970, 1971, 1975, 1977, 1986) and bronze (1968). Participant of many international women's chess tournaments, achieved best results in Lublin (1969, shared 1st-2nd place), Pernik (1973, shared 1st-4th place), Lublin (1974, 1st place), Subotica (1974, shared 2nd-3rd place), Nałęczów (1978, shared 1st-2nd place). In 1970, she was awarded the FIDE Woman International Master (WIM) title.

Gertrude Baumstark four times participated in the Women's World Chess Championship Interzonal Tournaments:

- In 1971, at Interzonal Tournament in Ohrid shared 16th-17th place;
- In 1973, at Interzonal Tournament in Menorca has taken 12th place;
- In 1976, at Interzonal Tournament in Tbilisi shared 7th-8th place;
- In 1979, at Interzonal Tournament in Alicante shared 9th-10th place.

Gertrude Baumstark played for Romania in the Women's Chess Olympiads:

- In 1969, at second board in the 4th Chess Olympiad (women) in Lublin (+2, =2, -4),
- In 1972, at first reserve board in the 5th Chess Olympiad (women) in Skopje (+2, =2, -1) and won the team silver medal,
- In 1974, at second board in the 6th Chess Olympiad (women) in Medellín (+7, =4, -2) and won the team silver medal,
- In 1978, at second board in the 8th Chess Olympiad (women) in Buenos Aires (+8, =4, -1) and won the individual silver medal,
- In 1980, at second board in the 9th Chess Olympiad (women) in Valletta (+2, =1, -2).

Since 2004, Gertrude Baumstark represented Germany in international chess tournaments.
