= Katarina Blagojević =

Serbian chess player (1943–2021)

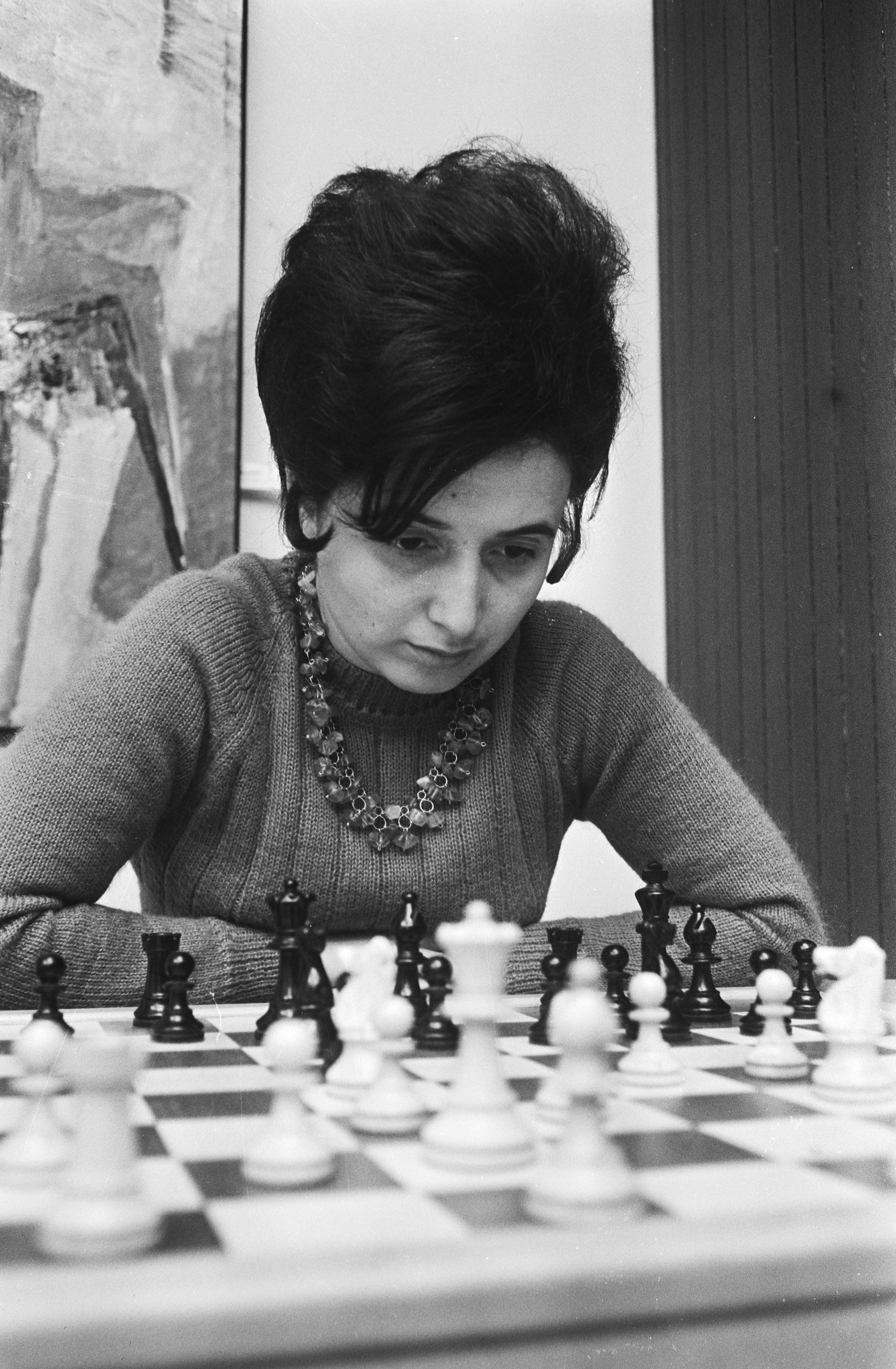
- Blagojević in 1971

Personal information
- Born: 31 October 1943 Belgrade, Occupied Serbia, occupied Kingdom of Yugoslavia
- Died: 15 November 2021 (aged 78)

Chess career
- Country: Yugoslavia → Serbia and Montenegro → Serbia
- Title: Woman Grandmaster (1986)
- Peak rating: 2340 (January 1990)
- Peak ranking: No. 14 woman (July 1972)
Medal record
Women's chess
Representing Yugoslavia
Women's Chess Olympiad
Silver medal – second place	1963 Split	Team
Bronze medal – third place	1966 Oberhausen	Indiv. 1st res. board

Katarina Blagojević (née Jovanović; 31 October 1943 — 15 November 2021), also known as Katarina Blagojević-Jovanović (Serbian Cyrillic: Катарина Благојевић-Јовановић) was a Serbian chess player who held the title of Woman Grandmaster (WGM, 1986). She shared 4th–5th place in the Women's World Chess Championship Candidates Tournament in 1964. She was a three-time winner of the Yugoslav Women's Chess Championship (1961, 1971, 1974) and won a team silver medal and bronze individual medal at the Women's Chess Olympiads in 1963 and 1966, respectively.

== Career ==
An established star since the early 1960s, Katarina was joined in that status by her two younger sisters — first by the middle, future WIM Ružica, in the late 1960s, while the youngest, future WIM and top-20 player, Gordana, soon followed in the early 1970s — and they became known in the chess world as the Jovanović sisters. Each sister won a Yugoslav women's national championship and played in Interzonal Tournaments. When all three qualified for a zone tournament in the early 1970s, it was the first such occurrence in the history of international chess, and it caused FIDE to draft a new paragraph about family relationships to avoid potential situations of matches being thrown by one to help another. They were the most famous trio of sisters in the chess world before the emergence of the Polgar sisters (Susan, Sofia, and Judit Polgár).

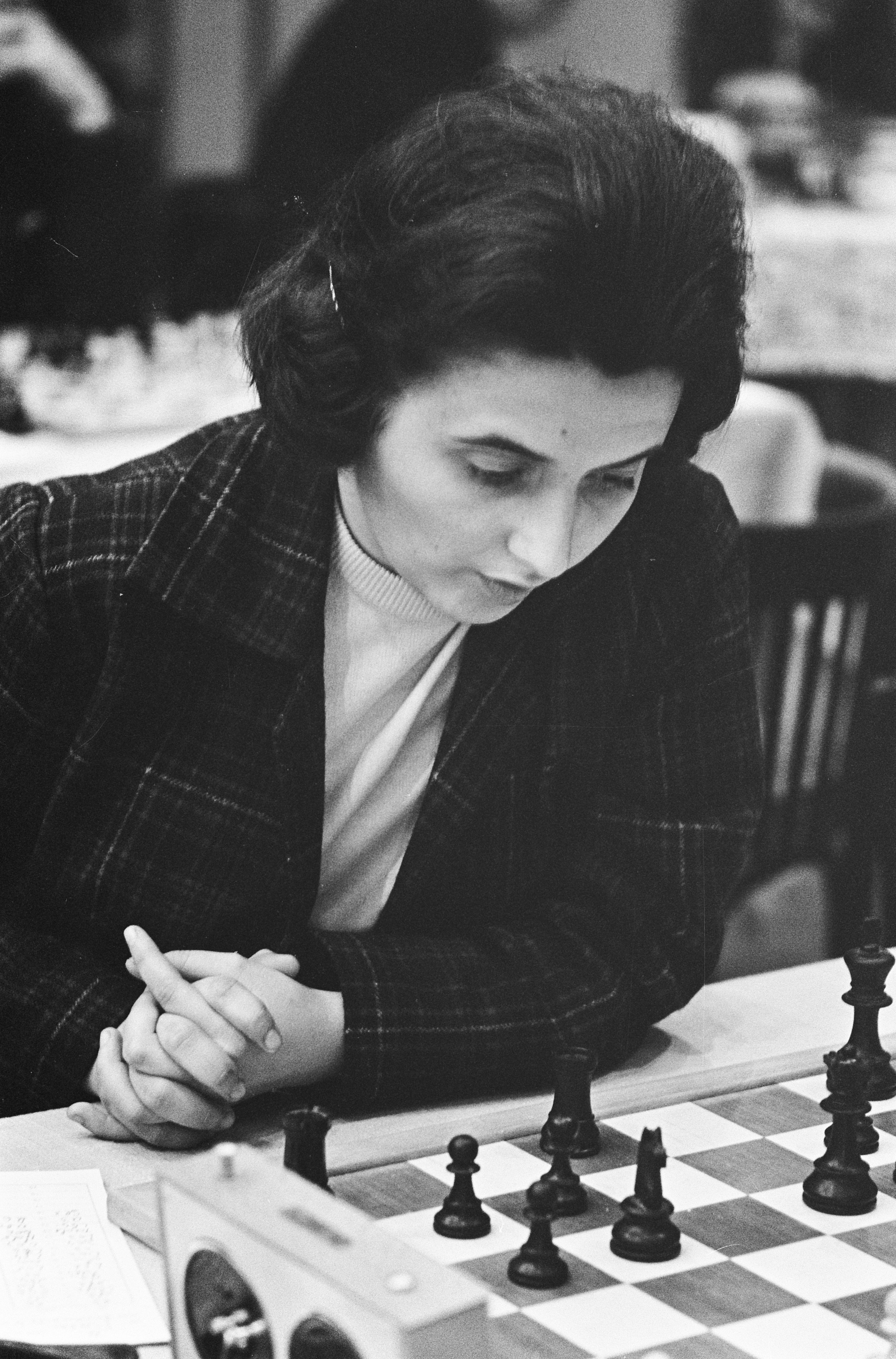
Blagojević (Hoogovens, 1965)

From the early 1960s to mid-1970s, she was one of the leading Yugoslav women's chess players. Katarina Blagojević won the Yugoslav Women's Chess Championship three times, in 1961, 1971 and 1974. With ŠK Red Star Belgrade, she won the Yugoslav League five times, in 1967, 1968, 1970, 1975 and 1976. The winner of many international chess tournaments, including three consecutive wins in Hoogovens Beverwijk tournament (1960, 1961, 1962), and the win in Amsterdam in 1963.

In 1964, Katarina Blagojević achieved the greatest success in her chess career, when she shared 4th–5th place in the Women's World Chess Championship Candidates Tournament in Sukhumi.

Katarina Blagojević played in two Women's World Chess Championship Interzonal Tournaments:

- In 1971, at Interzonal Tournament in Ohrid finished in 9th place;
- In 1973, at Interzonal Tournament in Menorca shared 10th–11th place.

She also won the European Zonal 1 in 1975 in Karlovy Vary, but didn't play in the subsequent Interzonal Tournament. Katarina Blagojević played for Yugoslavia in five Women's Chess Olympiads:

- In 1963, at first reserve board in the 2nd Chess Olympiad (women) in Split (+2, =2, −0) and won the team silver medal,
- In 1966, at first reserve board in the 3rd Chess Olympiad (women) in Oberhausen (+6, =2, −1) and won the individual bronze medal,
- In 1969, at first reserve board in the 4th Chess Olympiad (women) in Lublin (+4, =3, −2),
- In 1972, at second board in the 5th Chess Olympiad (women) in Skopje (+5, =4, −2),
- In 1974, at second board in the 6th Chess Olympiad (women) in Medellín (+7, =3, −2).

She played in the traditional USSR vs Yugoslavia match, defeating Tatiana Zatulovskaya 2½–1½ in 1970.

In 1964, Katarina Blagojević was awarded the FIDE Woman International master (WIM) title and in 1986, she was awarded FIDE Woman Grandmaster (WGM) title for her previous results.

Her highest ranking on the FIDE women's rating list was No. 14 in July 1972, while her highest Elo rating was 2340 in January 1990.

For her silver medal in the Olympiad, the Government of Serbia awarded her National Sports Recognition in 2007, including sports pension, of which she donated 10000 dinars to help victims of 2014 floods in Serbia.
