= Ružica Milosavljević =

Serbian chess player (born 1946)

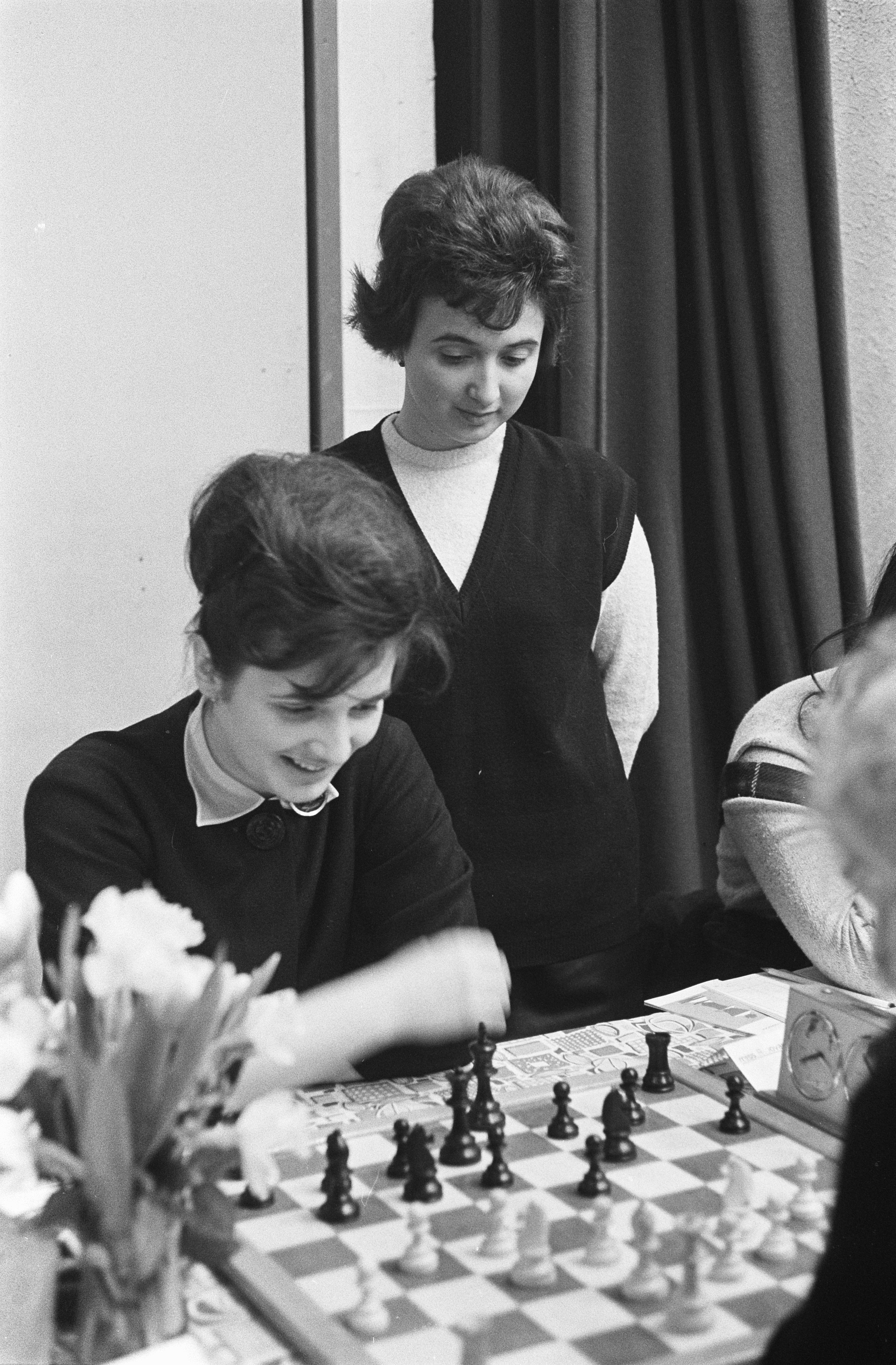
- Ružica Milosavljević (watched by her sister Katja [1964])

Personal information
- Born: April 29, 1946 (age 80) Belgrade, PR Serbia, FPR Yugoslavia

Chess career
- Country: Yugoslavia → Serbia
- Title: Woman International Master (1971)
- FIDE rating: 2140 [inactive]
- Peak rating: 2205 (January 1990)
- Peak ranking: No. 44 woman (July 1972)

Ružica Milosavljević (née Jovanović; born 29 April 1946), also known as Ružica Milosavljević-Jovanović (Serbian Cyrillic: Ружица Милосављевић-Јовановић), is a Serbian chess player who holds the title of Woman International Master (WIM, 1971). She won the Yugoslav Women's Chess Championship in 1969.

== Biography ==
In the late 1960s and early 1970s, Ružica Milosavljević was one of the leading Yugoslav women's chess players. In 1969, she won the Yugoslav Women's Chess Championship. In 1971, she participated at the Women's World Chess Championship Interzonal Tournament in Ohrid and shared 11th-12th place. Also in 1971, she was awarded the FIDE Woman International Master (WIM) title.

Her highest ranking on the FIDE women's rating list was No. 44 in July 1972, while her highest Elo rating was 2205 in January 1990.
