= Olivera Prokopović =

Serbian chess player

Personal information
- Full name: Olivera Bjelajac-Prokopović
- Born: 26 December 1949 Leskovac, Yugoslavia
- Died: 2007 (aged 57–58)

Chess career
- Country: Yugoslavia → Serbia
- Title: Woman International Master (1979)

Olivera Prokopović (26 December 1949 – 2007), also Olivera Bjelajac-Prokopović, was a Serbian chess player who held the FIDE title of Woman International Master (1979). She is a winner of the Yugoslav Women's Chess Championship (1978).

== Biography ==
In the late 1970s and early 1980s Olivera Prokopović was one of the leading Yugoslav women's chess players. She won the Yugoslav Women's Championship in 1978 on tie-break. In 1979, she participated at the Women's World Chess Championship Interzonal Tournament in Alicante shared 13th-14th place In 1979, she was awarded the FIDE Woman International Master (WIM) title.

Olivera Prokopović played for Yugoslavia in the Women's Chess Olympiads:

- In 1978, at first reserve board in the 8th Chess Olympiad (women) in Buenos Aires (+2, =0, -1),
- In 1980, at first reserve board in the 9th Chess Olympiad (women) in Valletta (+4, =3, -1).
