= Květa Eretová =

Czech chess player (1926–2021)

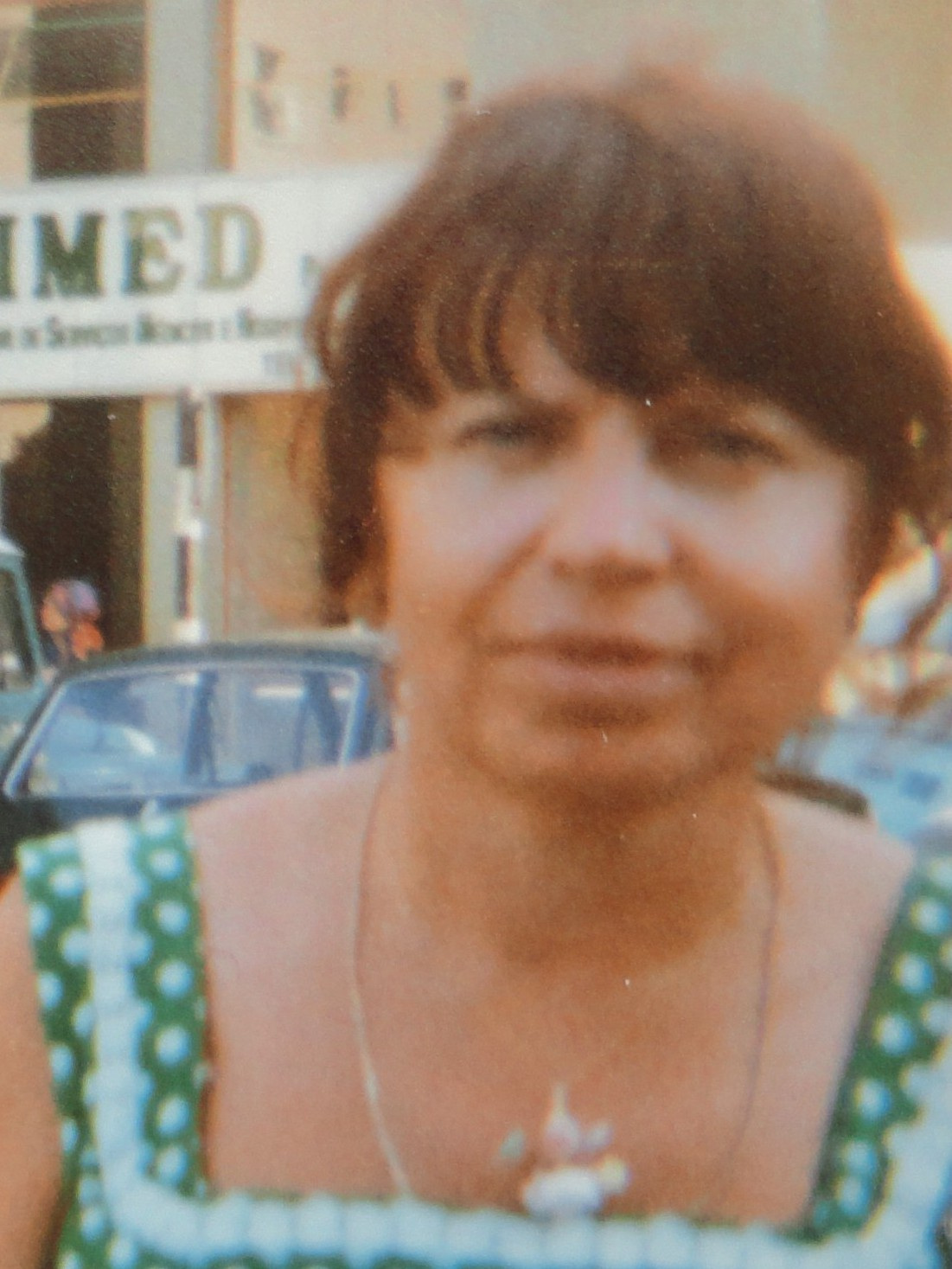
- Eretová in 1979

Personal information
- Born: 21 October 1926 Prague, Czechoslovakia
- Died: 8 January 2021 (aged 94)

Chess career
- Country: Czechoslovakia → Czech Republic
- Title: Woman Grandmaster (1986)
- Peak rating: 2205 (January 1976)

Květa Eretová (née Jeništová; 21 October 1926 – 8 January 2021) was a Czech chess player, who was awarded the title Woman Grandmaster (WGM) by FIDE in 1986. She was ten times Czechoslovak women's chess champion.

== Biography ==
From the mid-1950s to the mid-1970s, Eretová was one of the leading Czechoslovak female chess players. She won the Czechoslovak Women's Chess Championships ten times: 1955, 1960, 1961, 1962, 1963, 1964, 1966, 1975, 1976 and 1986. Overall, she won 23 medals (including 10 silver and 3 bronzes), a record for all time championships. She was the medalist of many international chess tournaments, including the 2nd place Moscow (1971), Emmen (1971) and Halle (1971, 1978).

Květa Eretová participated in the Women's World Chess Championship Candidates Tournament twice:

- In 1959, at Candidates Tournament in Plovdiv she took 10th place;
- In 1964, at Candidates Tournament in Sukhumi she took 10th place.

In 1979, she participated in Women's Interzonal tournament in Rio de Janeiro, where shared 8th-9th places.

Eretová played for Czechoslovakia in the Women's Chess Olympiad:

- In 1957, on second board in the 1st Chess Olympiad (women) in Emmen (+8, =1, -2) and won the individual silver medal,
- In 1966, on first board in the 3rd Chess Olympiad (women) in Oberhausen (+4, =6, -2),
- In 1969, on second board in the 4th Chess Olympiad (women) in Lublin (+5, =3, -1) and won the team and the individual bronze medals,
- In 1972, on second board in the 5th Chess Olympiad (women) in Skopje (+2, =5, -1),
- In 1974, on first board in the 6th Chess Olympiad (women) in Medellín (+4, =4, -2).

In 1957, Eretová was awarded the title International Woman Master (WIM) by FIDE, and in 1986 she received that of Woman Grandmaster (WGM).
