= Tanja Belamarić =

Croatian chess player

Personal information
- Born: 16 July 1946 (age 79)

Chess career
- Country: Yugoslavia (before 1991); Croatia (since 1991)
- Title: Woman International Master (1967)
- Peak rating: 2250 (January 1987)

Tanja Belamarić (born 16 July 1946) is a Croatian chess player who holds the FIDE title of Woman International Master (WIM, 1967).

From the early 1970s to the early 1990s Belamarić was one of the leading Croatian women's chess players. In 1967, she was awarded the FIDE Woman International Master (WIM) title. In 1971, Belamarić participated at the Women's World Chess Championship Interzonal Tournament in Ohrid and shared an 11th-12th place.

She played for Croatia in the Women's Chess Olympiads:

- In 1992, at first reserve board in the 30th Chess Olympiad (women) in Manila (+4, =5, -2),
- In 1994, at first reserve board in the 31st Chess Olympiad (women) in Moscow (+2, =5, -0).

Belamarić played for Croatia in the European Team Chess Championship:

- In 1992, at second board in the 1st European Team Chess Championship (women) in Debrecen (+2, =2, -2).
