= Women's World Chess Championship 1975 =

The 1975 Women's World Chess Championship was won by Nona Gaprindashvili, who successfully defended her title against challenger Nana Alexandria. This was Gaprindashvili's fourth title defense - and the last successful one.

== 1973 Interzonal Tournament ==
An Interzonal tournament was held in Menorca in October and November 1973, featuring the best players from each FIDE zone. A total of 20 players took part, with the top four qualifying for the Candidates Tournament. Kozlovskaya won the tournament and progressed directly, while the four players tied for second place contested a playoff in Kislovodsk in February and March 1974 from which one (Konopleva) was eliminated.

1973 Women's Interzonal Tournament
	Player	1	2	3	4	5	6	7	8	9	10	11	12	13	14	15	16	17	18	19	20	Points	Tie break
1	Valentina Kozlovskaya (Soviet Union)	-	0	½	½	½	1	1	1	½	0	1	½	0	1	1	1	1	1	1	1	13½	
2	Marta Shul (Soviet Union)	1	-	0	½	1	0	1	½	½	½	½	0	1	1	1	1	1	1	1	½	13	112.25
3	Natalia Konopleva (Soviet Union)	½	1	-	½	0	1	1	½	½	½	0	1	½	½	½	1	1	1	1	1	13	110.00
4	Irina Levitina (Soviet Union)	½	½	½	-	½	0	0	1	½	½	1	½	1	1	1	½	1	1	1	1	13	107.25
5	Nana Alexandria (Soviet Union)	½	0	1	½	-	0	½	0	½	0	1	1	1	1	1	1	1	1	1	1	13	104.00
6	Jana Hartston (England)	0	1	0	1	1	-	½	½	½	½	½	1	1	0	½	½	1	1	1	½	12	106.00
7	Tatiana Zatulovskaya (Soviet Union)	0	0	0	1	½	½	-	½	½	½	1	½	1	1	½	1	½	1	1	1	12	98.00
8	Alexandra Nicolau (Romania)	0	½	½	0	1	½	½	-	½	½	0	½	½	1	1	1	1	1	1	1	12	95.00
9	Zsuzsa Veroci (Hungary)	½	½	½	½	½	½	½	½	-	½	½	½	1	½	0	½	1	1	1	1	11½	
10	Elisabeta Polihroniade (Romania)	1	½	½	½	1	½	½	½	½	-	0	½	1	0	1	0	½	½	1	1	11	100.50
11	Katarina Jovanović (Yugoslavia)	0	½	1	0	0	½	0	1	½	1	-	0	½	1	½	½	1	1	1	1	11	88.00
12	Gertrude Baumstark (Romania)	½	1	0	½	0	0	½	½	½	½	1	-	½	½	½	0	0	1	1	1	9½	
13	Milunka Lazarević (Yugoslavia)	1	0	½	0	0	0	0	½	0	0	½	½	-	0	1	1	1	1	1	1	9	
14	Pepita Ferrer (Spain)	0	0	½	0	0	1	0	0	½	1	0	½	1	-	½	½	1	½	½	1	8½	
15	Eva Ladanyike-Karakas (Hungary)	0	0	½	0	0	½	½	0	1	0	½	½	0	½	-	1	0	½	1	1	7½	
16	Ljubica Zivkovic (Yugoslavia)	0	0	0	½	0	½	0	0	½	1	½	1	0	½	0	-	½	1	0	1	7	
17	Ruth Volgl Cardoso (Brazil)	0	0	0	0	0	0	½	0	0	½	0	1	0	0	1	½	-	½	0	½	4½	
18	Eva Aronson (USA)	0	0	0	0	0	0	0	0	0	½	0	0	0	½	½	0	½	-	1	½	3½	20.25
19	Linda Maddern (Australia)	0	0	0	0	0	0	0	0	0	0	0	0	0	½	0	1	1	0	-	1	3½	17.75
20	Ruth Donnelly (USA)	0	½	0	0	0	½	0	0	0	0	0	0	0	0	0	0	½	½	0	-	2	

1974 Kislovodsk playoff
		1	2	3	4	Total
1	Nana Alexandria (Soviet Union)	x x x x	1 ½ ½ ½	1 ½ 1 ½	1 ½ 1 ½	8½
2	Irina Levitina (Soviet Union)	0 ½ ½ ½	x x x x	½ 1 0 1	½ 1 1 ½	7
3	Marta Shul (Soviet Union)	0 ½ 0 ½	½ 0 1 0	x x x x	1 1 1 1	6½
4	Natalia Konopleva (Soviet Union)	0 ½ 0 ½	½ 0 0 ½	0 0 0 0	x x x x	2

== 1974-75 Candidates matches ==
The top three from the Interzonal were supposed to have been joined by Alla Kushnir, the loser of the last championship match. However, Kushnir had recently fled the Soviet Union and was unable to participate, so instead four players qualified from the Interzonal (Kushnir later settled in Israel and went on to represent her new country in the next championship cycle).

These four players contested a knock-out series of matches. Alexandria won, earning the right to challenge reigning champion Gaprindashvili.

Semifinals
Riga, May–June 1974
(Soviet Union) Nana Alexandria	5½
(Soviet Union) Marta Shul	2½
Kislovodsk, May–June 1974
(Soviet Union) Irina Levitina	6½
(Soviet Union) Valentina Kozlovskaya	5½

Final
Moscow, Feb-Mar 1975
(Soviet Union) Nana Alexandria	9
(Soviet Union) Irina Levitina	8

== 1975 Championship Match ==
The championship match was played in Pitsunda and Tbilisi in 1975. In the end, Alexandria was no match for Gaprindashvili, who retained her title by a comfortable margin.

Women's World Championship Match 1975
	1	2	3	4	5	6	7	8	9	10	11	12	Total
Nona Gaprindashvili (Soviet Union)	1	0	1	1	½	1	1	0	1	0	1	1	8½
Nana Alexandria (Soviet Union)	0	1	0	0	½	0	0	1	0	1	0	0	3½
