= Natalia Konopleva =

Russian chess player (1944–2011)

Personal information
- Full name: Natalia Viktorovna Konopleva
- Born: 23 November 1944 Murmansk, Russia
- Died: 15 March 2011 (aged 66) Moscow, Russia

Chess career
- Country: Soviet Union; Russia
- Title: Woman Grandmaster (1976)
- Peak rating: 2285 (January 1975)

Natalia Viktorovna Konopleva (Russian: Наталья Викторовна Коноплёва; 23 November 1944 – 15 March 2011) was a Soviet and Russian chess player who held the FIDE title of Woman Grandmaster (1976).

== Biography ==
Natalia Konopleva has made the first success in the USSR girl's chess championships: 1959 — 1st; 1960 — 2nd-3rd; 1961 — 1st-2nd, 1962 — 2nd-3rd places. In the 1960s and in the 1970s, Natalia Konopleva was one of the leading chess players in Soviet Union. She won the Russian SFSR Women's Chess Championship (1964) and Moscow City Women's Chess Championship (1970). She was a member of the Moscow team who twice won the Soviet Team Chess Championship (1963, 1967). Also she won Soviet Team Chess Cup with the sports association Trud team in 1964. Natalia Konopleva participated in Women's Soviet Championship eight times. Her best results: 1967 and 1972 – 2nd–4th; 1969 – 4th; 1970 – 3rd places. In the International Women's Chess tournament she won 1st place in Piotrków Trybunalski (1965); 2nd place in Moscow; shared 2nd-3rd place in Sofia (1970) and Tbilisi (1973). In 1970 Natalia Konopleva awarded the FIDE Woman International Master (WIM) title, but in 1976 – Woman grandmaster (WGM) title.

Natalia Konopleva two times participated in the Women's World Chess Championship Interzonal Tournaments and every time she was just a little short of getting to the Candidates Tournament:

- In 1971, at Interzonal Tournament in Ohrid she shared 4th-5th place with Mária Ivánka and won additional match for Candidates Tournament reserve place with 4:2;
- In 1973, at Interzonal Tournament in Menorca she shared 2nd-5th place with Marta Shul, Nana Alexandria, Irina Levitina, but came last in 1974 Kislovodsk playoff four players tournament.

However, the non-entrance to the 1974 Candidates Tournament became a terrible blow for a young, talented, but very emotional women. Natalia Konopleva had a mental breakdown, she stopped playing chess for ten years, only returned to chess tournaments in the 1980s. After the fall of the Iron Curtain, she played in chess tournaments in Germany, Hungary, the Czech Republic. But her best years had already passed, and she finally left chess. The last years of life she lived in her Moscow apartment and died after heavy frostbite.
