= Valeri Yandemirov =

Russian chess player

Personal information
- Born: Valeri Petrovich Yandemirov; 11 February 1963 Kazan, Soviet Union
- Died: 16 November 2017 (aged 54) Kazan, Russia

Chess career
- Country: Soviet Union → Russia
- Title: Grandmaster (1997)
- Peak rating: 2545 (January 1998)

Valeri Petrovich Yandemirov (Russian: Валерий Петрович Яндемиров; 11 February 1963 – 16 November 2017) was a Russian chess player.

== Biography ==
Born in Kazan, Tatarstan, Yandemirov was awarded the titles of International Master, in 1993, and Grandmaster, in 1997, by FIDE. In the European Club Cup, he won three team medals: a silver, in 2006, and a bronze, in 2004, playing for team Ladya of Kazan, and a bronze in 1995 playing for Poliot of Chelyabinsk.

He died in his home on 16 November 2017.
