= Zoltan Sarosy =

Hungarian-Canadian chess player (1906–2017)

- Born: August 23, 1906; Budapest, Austria-Hungary
- Died: June 19, 2017 (aged 110 years, 300 days); Toronto, Ontario, Canada
- Occupation: Professional chess player
- Known for: Winner of chess tournaments supercentenarian
- Spouse(s): First wife (married 1931–1950; Divorced); Hella Mällo (married 1950–1998; her death)

Zoltan Sarosy (August 23, 1906 – June 19, 2017) was a Hungarian-Canadian professional chess master and supercentenarian. He was born in Budapest and won numerous tournaments in his native country before immigrating to Canada in the early 1950s.

== Early life ==
Sarosy was born in Budapest, Austria-Hungary, on August 23, 1906.

== Tournaments ==
Sarosy won chess tournaments in several cities in Hungary including Nagykanizsa (1929), Pécs (1932), and Budapest (1934). During World War II he won the Hungarian Master Candidates Tournament in 1943. After the war, following a period in a refugee camp in West Germany, he moved to France in 1948. He drew a training match (2–2) with Alsace Champion Henri Sapin in 1950 and then emigrated to Canada, arriving in Halifax and then settling in Toronto. In Toronto he took up correspondence chess and was thrice Canadian Correspondence Champion (1967, 1972, 1981). In 2006 he was inducted into the Canadian Chess Hall of Fame. He was still actively playing chess at the age of 107.

== Later life ==
At the end of World War II after having fled Hungary where he served as a military translator, and divorced his first wife after she refused to move to Canada. After divorcing his first wife, he married Hella Mällo (1930-1998), an Estonian immigrant, in Canada. On August 23, 2016, Sarosy became a supercentenarian, when he reached the age of 110 years, and at the time was the oldest known living man and fourth oldest known living person in Canada. Sarosy died on June 19, 2017 in Toronto.

== Sources ==
- Zoltan Sarosy player profile and games at Chessgames.com
- Berry, Jonathan, "Chess", The Globe and Mail, December 30, 2006, pg. R17
- Berry, J. "Chess", The Globe and Mail, September 16, 2006, pg. R25
- Berry, J. "Chess", The Globe and Mail, April 14, 2007, pg. R25
