= Vadim Teplitsky =

Russian-Israeli chess historian

- Вадим Теплицкий
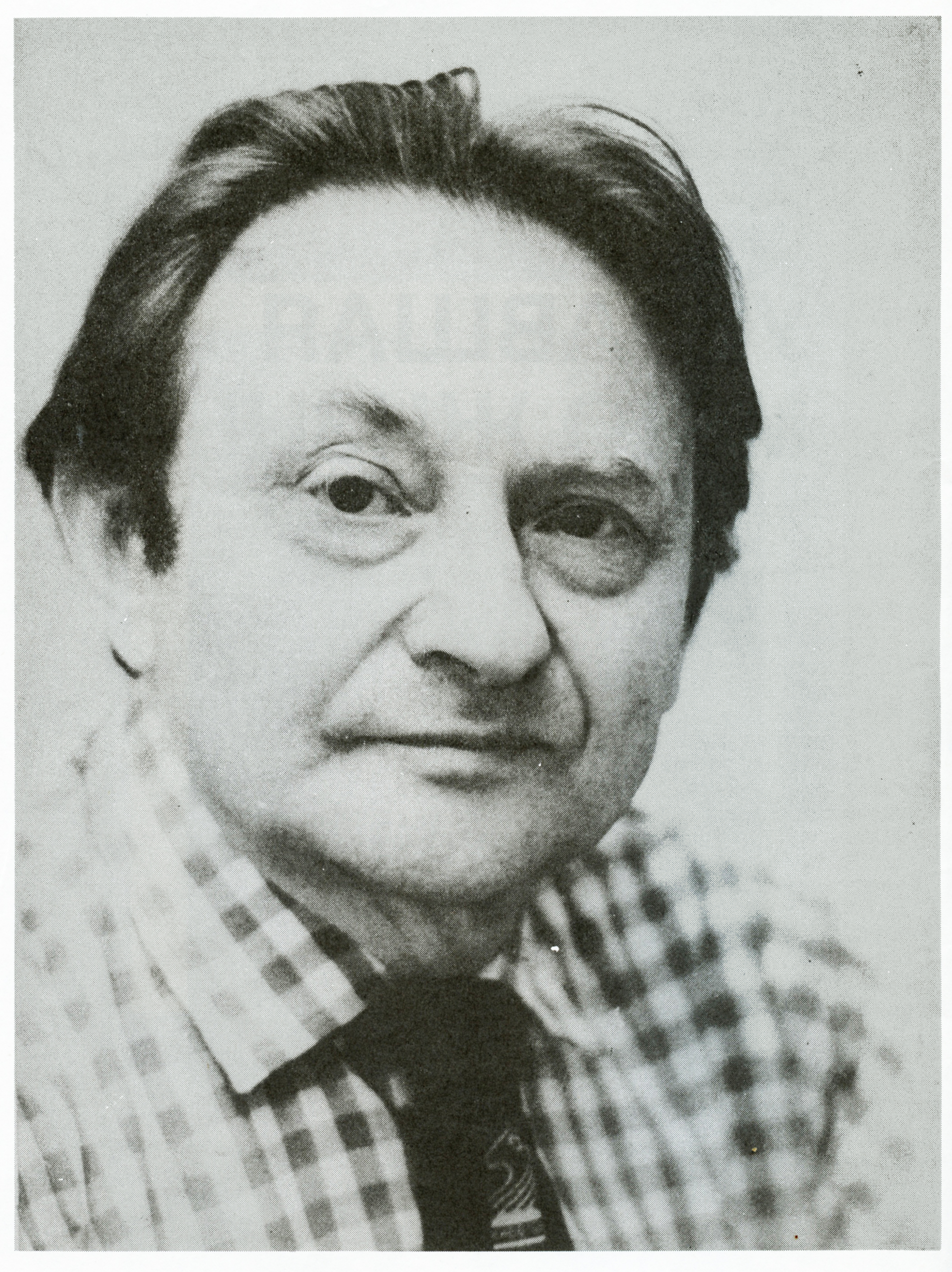
- Born: Vadim Izrailevich Teplitsky; 18 June 1927; Kyiv, Soviet Ukraine
- Died: 30 April 2017 (aged 89); Bat Yam, Israel
- Occupations: Chess historian; journalist; engineer; economist

Vadim Izrailevich Teplitsky (Russian: Вадим Израилевич Теплицкий; 18 June 1927 – 30 April 2017) was a Soviet and Israeli engineer-economist, journalist and chess historian. He is the author of more than 20 books, including monographs on the history of chess, as well as over 400 articles, essays, reports, poems, parodies, epigrams published in Ukrainian, Israeli, Russian and American press, as well as on the Internet. He was a Soviet Chess Master Candidate. Teplitsky co-authored the Encyclopedic Dictionary of Chess (Moscow, 1990).

In August 1941, as a child, he was evacuated with his mother, first from Kyiv to Stalingrad, then, when German troops approached the city, the family fled to Soviet Central Asia. His father, a chemical engineer, Israel Gershkovich Teplitsky, volunteered for the front and was killed in action in 1941. Some of his family members perished during the Holocaust.

In February 1993, he repatriated to Israel and lived in the city of Bat Yam.

Teplitsky was recognized as the best chess journalist of Israel in 2002 by the Israeli Athletic Association. For five years, he worked on the Israeli radio RECA as a chess observer.

His name was included in the publication of the popular newspaper The Secret under the rubric "Jewish Names".

Among his main works is a large study called Jews in the History of Chess (1997).

Teplitsky described his life and his family history in the context of historical events of the 20th century in his autobiographical book The Country That Stole My Life.

== Bibliography ==
- V. I. Teplitsky. He did everything. // 64 — Weekly newspaper supplement «Soviet Sport», 1974, No. 11.
- V. M. Dvorak, V. I. Teplitsky. Chess without looking at the board / Kyiv: Health, 1988. — 129,[3] с. : silt.; 20 см; ISBN 5-311-00139-9.
- V. I. Teplitsky. The country, who stole my life : documentary story. Tel Aviv: Interpress Center, 1995, 61 с. : ill., portra., fax.; 29 см.
- V. I. Teplitsky. Jews in the history of chess. Tel Aviv: Interpress Center 1997. 319 с. : ill., portra.
- V. I. Teplitsky. Isaac Vistanetsky. Life in chess. Tel Aviv, 2001
- V. I. Teplitsky. Chess and music, 2001
- V. I. Teplitsky. My love, chess! Chess historian's notes / Tel Aviv, 2004
- V. I. Teplitsky. Isaac Lipnitsky. Rishon Lezion : MeDial, 2008
- V. I. Teplitsky. La Gioconda. Rishon Lezion : MeDial, 2009
- V. I. Teplitsky. A poet from the planet «Superiors». Rishon Lezion : MeDial, 2010
- V. I. Teplitsky. Younger brother «64» // «64». — 1969. — No. 9. — С. 6—7.
- Eduard Gufeld / Entry. article B. Teplitsky. — М.: FiS, 1985. — 192 с., silt.
