= Ljubica Živković =

Serbian and Yugoslav chess player

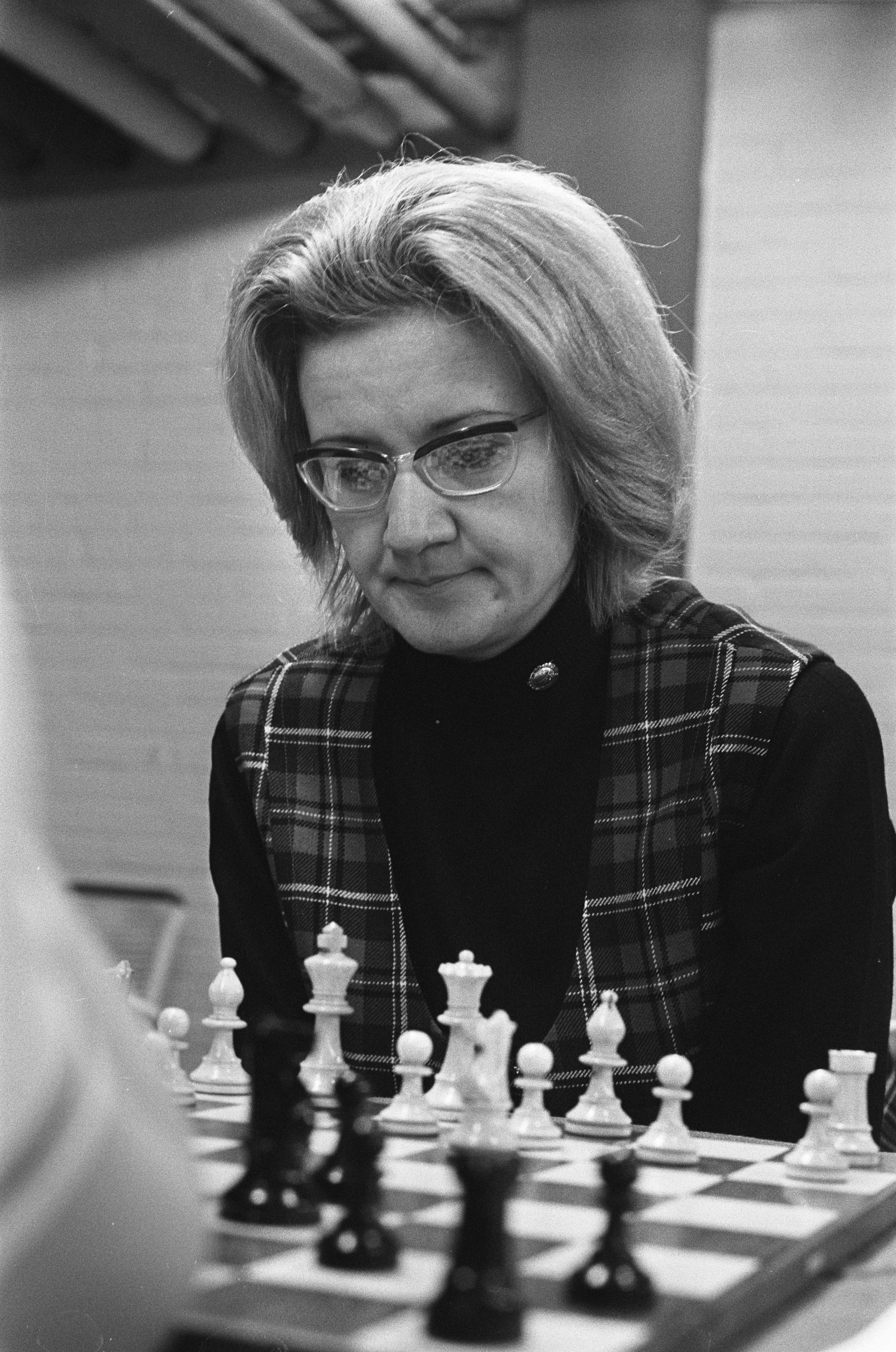
- Živković in 1973

Personal information
- Full name: Ljubica Živković-Jocić
- Born: 25 September 1936 Bukovac, Yugoslavia
- Died: 13 June 2017 (aged 80) Novi Sad, Serbia

Chess career
- Country: Yugoslavia → Serbia
- Title: Woman International Master (1966)
- Peak rating: 2125 (January 1979)

Ljubica Živković (née Jocić, 25 September 1936 – 13 June 2017) was a Serbian and Yugoslav chess player who held the FIDE title of Woman International Master (WIM, 1966). She was a winner of the Yugoslav Women's Chess Championship (1959).

== Biography ==
Živković was born in Bukovac, where she finished elementary school and then secondary economics school in Novi Sad. She was employed in Sarajevo, where she spent two years and then returned to Novi Sad, where she worked at Yugoslavian company Naftagaspromet information center until retirement.

She learned chess early in her youth, and she joined the Novi Sad Chess Club in 1953 when she moved to Novi Sad. She won several times at the Women's Championship of Vojvodina, and in 1959 in Zagreb she won the Yugoslav Women's Chess Championship. In 1966, Ljubica Živković was awarded the FIDE Woman International Master (WIM) title. In 1973, she participated in the Women's World Chess Championship Interzonal Tournament in Menorca and ranked 16th place. For her main Novi Sad chess club (NŠK) she played about 150 official matches, with a high percentage of performance. Most of her wins contributed to the club's biggest successes. Together with Dušica Čejić, playing for NŠK, she won the first cup in Yugoslavia's chess cup in Pula in 1979.

Unfortunately, due to family and business reasons and poor support of chess structures, Živković played chess as an amateur and did not use her great chess potential.

After completing her chess player career, Živković was known as chess arbiter. She was awarded the title of the International Arbiter in 1984, and she served as deputy chief arbiter and chief arbiter of the 29th Chess Olympiad (women) in Novi Sad in 1990.
