= Gisela Fischdick =

German chess Woman Grandmaster

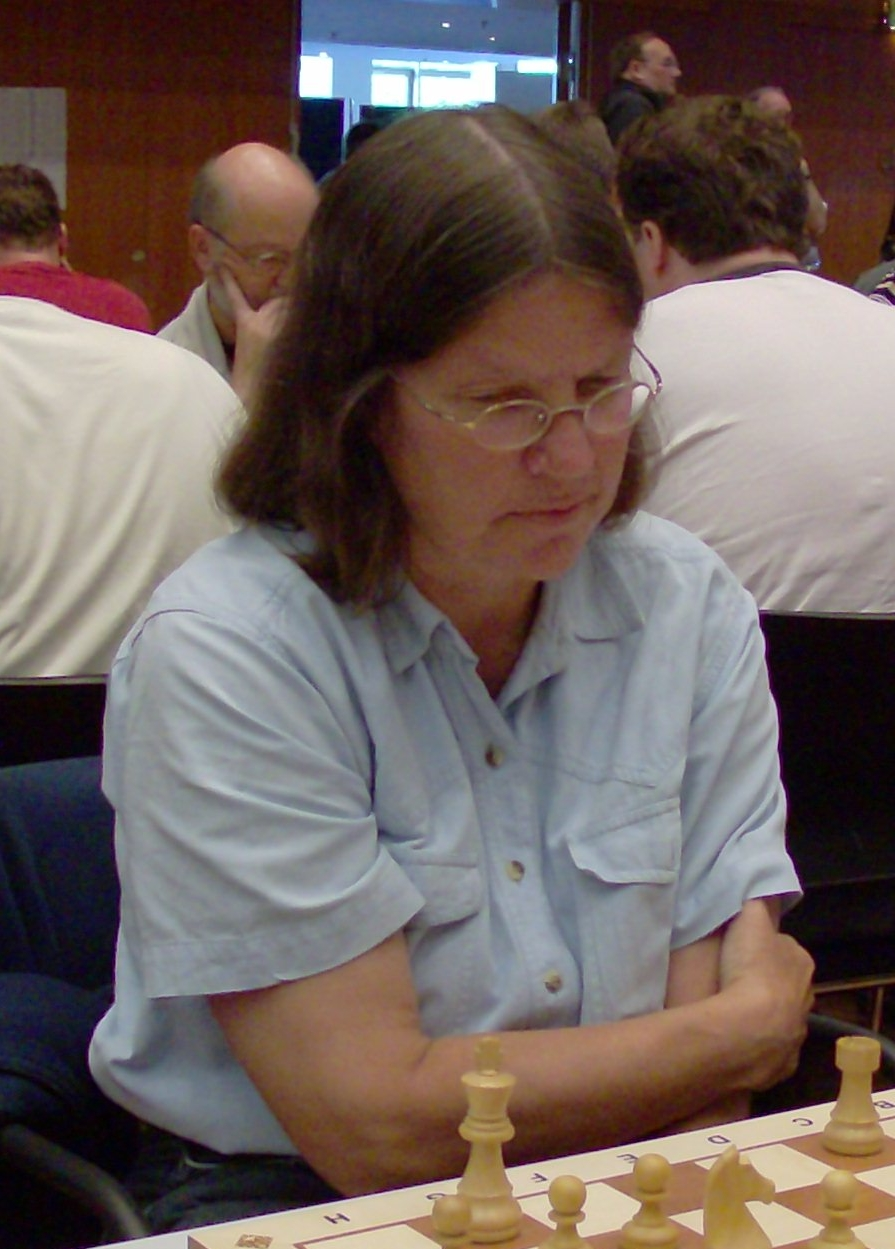
Gisela Fischdick: German chess player

Gisela Fischdick (born 5 November 1955 in Mülheim an der Ruhr) is a German chess Woman Grandmaster. In July 2011 her FIDE rating was 2236, making her the 21st ranked active female player in Germany. She won several West German women's championships in fast chess or "Blitzschach". She earned the Woman International Master (WIM) title in 1980 and the Woman Grandmaster (WGM) title in 2006.
