= Milunka Lazarević =

Serbian chess player and journalist (1932–2018)

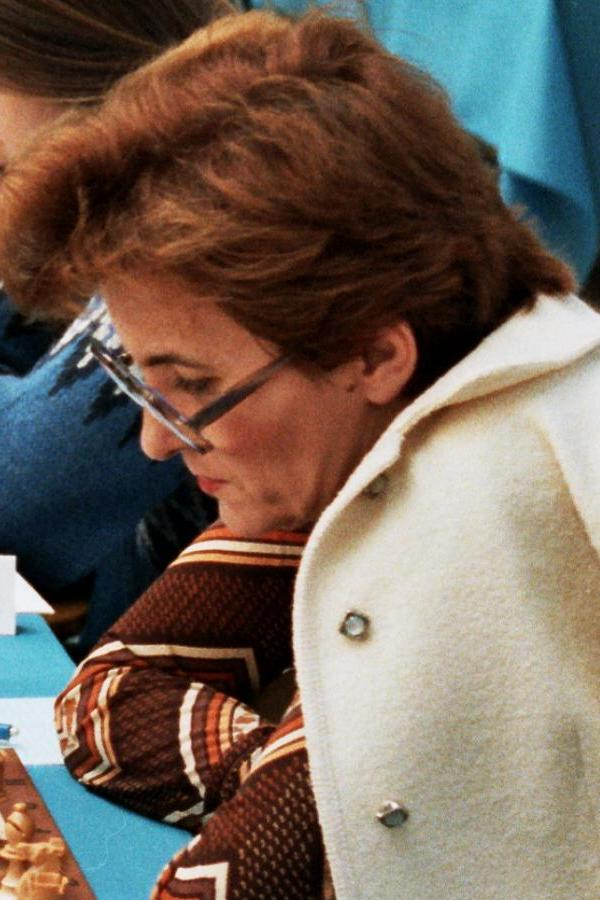
- Lazarević at the 25th Chess Olympiad in Lucerne 1982

Personal information
- Born: 1 December 1932 Šantarovac, Yugoslavia
- Died: 15 December 2018 (aged 86) Belgrade, Serbia

Chess career
- Country: Yugoslavia → Serbia
- Title: Woman Grandmaster (1976)
- Peak rating: 2320 (July 1971)

Milunka Lazarević (Serbian Cyrillic: Милунка Лазаревић; 1 December 1932 – 15 December 2018) was a Serbian chess player and journalist. For many years, she was the strongest female player of Yugoslavia and became a contender for the Women's World Chess Championship.

== Biography ==
Born in Šantarovac, Yugoslavia, Lazarević was taught chess by her father at the age of fourteen and quickly became recognised as a talent in the game. Progressing to become Yugoslavia's leading female player, she won the women's national championship eleven times between 1952 and 1982. It was during this period that she enjoyed a rivalry with compatriot Vera Nedeljkovic, the two regularly placing well in both domestic and international competition. Her playing style developed to be both exciting and imaginative, although there were occasions when this caused her to overplay the position, particularly against weaker players. According to Anne Sunnucks, this often robbed her of first prize.

Among her most notable early results were those from four zonal tournaments; she finished joint third at Herceg Novi 1954, joint second at Venice 1957, joint first at Vrnjacka Banja 1960 and third at Bad Neuenahr 1963. Her best result was to tie for first place at the Women's World Championship Candidates Tournament in Sukhumi 1964. Unsuccessful in the play-off with Alla Kushnir and Tatiana Zatulovskaya, she missed the chance to challenge Nona Gaprindashvili for the Women's World Championship in 1965.

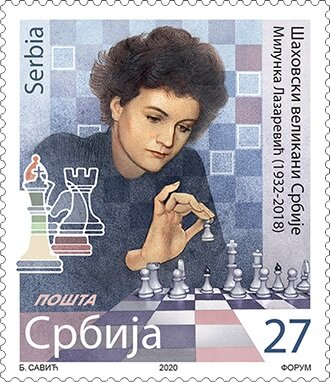
Lazarević on a 2020 Serbian stamp

Later achievements included a share of second place at the Ohrid Interzonal 1971 (after Nana Alexandria). There were also outright or shared first places at Wijk aan Zee, Belgrade, Emmen (all 1972) and the Travnik zonal tournament of 1978. In team chess, she competed on board one for Yugoslavia at several Women's Olympiads between 1963 and 1984, winning a silver team medal at Split in 1963.

Lazarević qualified as a Woman International Master in 1954 and a Woman Grandmaster in 1976. Additionally, she was awarded the International Arbiter title in 1970.

Described by Sunnucks as an attractive redhead, Lazarević spent many years working as a journalist and penned articles on Garry Kasparov and Boris Spassky for the magazine New In Chess. While her most active playing days subsided in the 1980s, she did not retire from the game altogether, participating at tournaments on a number of occasions in 2006 and 2008.

She died on 15 December 2018 at the age of 86 in Belgrade. Two years later, on September 23, 2020, the public company "Pošta Srbije" released a new postage stamps called: "Chess Giants of Serbia". In addition to Lazarević, Svetozar Gligorić, Boris Kostić, Petar Trifunović and Milan Matulović were also given this honor. On that occasion, short biographies of the players depicted on these stamps were also published. The texts are given in Serbian and English, and their authors are: grandmaster Aleksandar Matanović and sports journalist Miroslav Nešić.

== Notable game ==
Milunka Lazarević vs Corry Vreeken, Split 1963:

Lazarević vs. Vreeken, Split 1963

Position: g7 white king, h7 white pawn, f6 white knight, g6 black knight, h5 black king

Final position

1.e4 c5 2.Nf3 d6 3.d4 cxd4 4.Nxd4 Nf6 5.Nc3 a6 6.Bg5 e6 7.f4 b5 8.e5 dxe5 9.fxe5 Qc7 10.exf6 Qe5+ 11.Be2 Qxg5 12.O-O Ra7 13.Qd3 Rd7 14.Ne4 Qe5 15.c3 Bb7 16.Qg3 Qxg3 17.Nxg3 gxf6 18.Nh5 Be7 19.Nxf6+ Bxf6 20.Rxf6 Rg8 21.Rf2 Nc6 22.Nb3 Rd5 23.Bf3 Rdg5 24.a4 Nd8 25.Bxb7 Nxb7 26.axb5 axb5 27.Ra8+ Nd8 28.Rd2 Ke7 29.Na5 Rd5 30.Rxd5 exd5 31.Rb8 Rg5 32.Rxb5 Ne6 33.c4 Kd6 34. cxd5 Rxd5 35.Nc4+ Kc6 36.Rxd5 Kxd5 37.Ne3+ Ke4 38.Kf2 Nc5 39.Nd1 Nd3+ 40. Kg3 Ne1 41.Nf2+ Kd4 42.Nh3 Nd3 43.Ng5 Nxb2 44.Nxf7 Nd3 45.Ng5 h5 46.Kh4 Ke3 47.g3 Kf2 48.g4 hxg4 49.Kxg4 Ke3 50.h4 Nf4 51.Kf5 Nh5 52.Ne6 Kf3 53. Kg5 Ng3 54.Nc5 Kg2 55.Kg4 Kf2 56.Nd3+ Kg2 57.Nf4+ Kf2 58.Nh5 Ne2 59.Ng7 Ng3 60.Nf5 Ne4 61.Kf4 Nf6 62.Kg5 Nh7+ 63.Kg6 Nf8+ 64.Kf7 Nd7 65.h5 Ne5+ 66.Kf6 Ng4+ 67.Kg5 Kf3 68.Nh6 Nf2 69.Nf5 Nh3+ 70.Kf6 Kg4 71.h6 Ng5 72.Kg6 Ne6 73.Ne3+ Kh4 74.Kf6 Nf8 75.Kf7 Kh5 76.Ng4 Nh7 77.Kg7 Ng5 78.Nf6+ Kh4 79.Ne4 Ne6+ 80.Kg8 Nf4 81.h7 Ng6 82.Kg7 Kh5 83.Nf6+ 1-0

Thanks to this game, Lazarević won the best game prize for the best ending at the 2nd Women's Chess Olympiad.

== Bibliography ==
- Golombek, Harry, ed. (1981). The Penguin Encyclopedia of Chess. Penguin Books. ISBN 978-0-14-046452-8.
- Sunnucks, Anne (1970). The Encyclopaedia of Chess. Hale. ISBN 0709110308.
