= Women's World Chess Championship 1937 tournament =

Woman's World Chess Championship

The sixth Women's World Chess Championship took place during the 7th Chess Olympiad, held in Stockholm, Sweden from 31 July to 14 August 1937. The final results were as follows:

	Player	Points
1	Vera Menchik (TCH)	14
2	Clarice Benini (ITA)	10
3–4	Milda Lauberte (LAT)	9
3–4	Sonja Graf (GER)	9
5	Mary Bain (USA)	8½
6–7	Mona May Karff (PLE)	8
6–7	Nelly Fišerová (TCH)	8
8–9	Ingeborg Andersson (SWE)	7½
8–9	Mary Gilchrist (SCO)	7½
10–16	Róża Herman (POL)	7
10–16	Catharina Roodzant (NED)	7
10–16	Edith St. John (ENG)	7
10–16	Anna Andersson (SWE)	7
10–16	Regina Gerlecka (POL)	7
10–16	Clara Faragó (HUN)	7
10–16	Edith Holloway (ENG)	7
17–20	Barbara Flerow-Bułhak (POL)	6½
17–20	Gisela Harum (AUT)	6½
17–20	Salome Reischer (AUT)	6½
17–20	Olga Menchik (TCH)	6½
21–22	Florence Frankland Thomson (SCO)	6
21–22	Ingrid Larsen (DEN)	6
23	Katarina Beskow (SWE)	5½
24	A.M.S. O'Shannon (IRL)	5
25	Ruth Bloch Nakkerud (NOR)	2
26	Elisabeth Mellbye (NOR)	1
