= Clara Faragó =

Hungarian chess player (1905–1944)

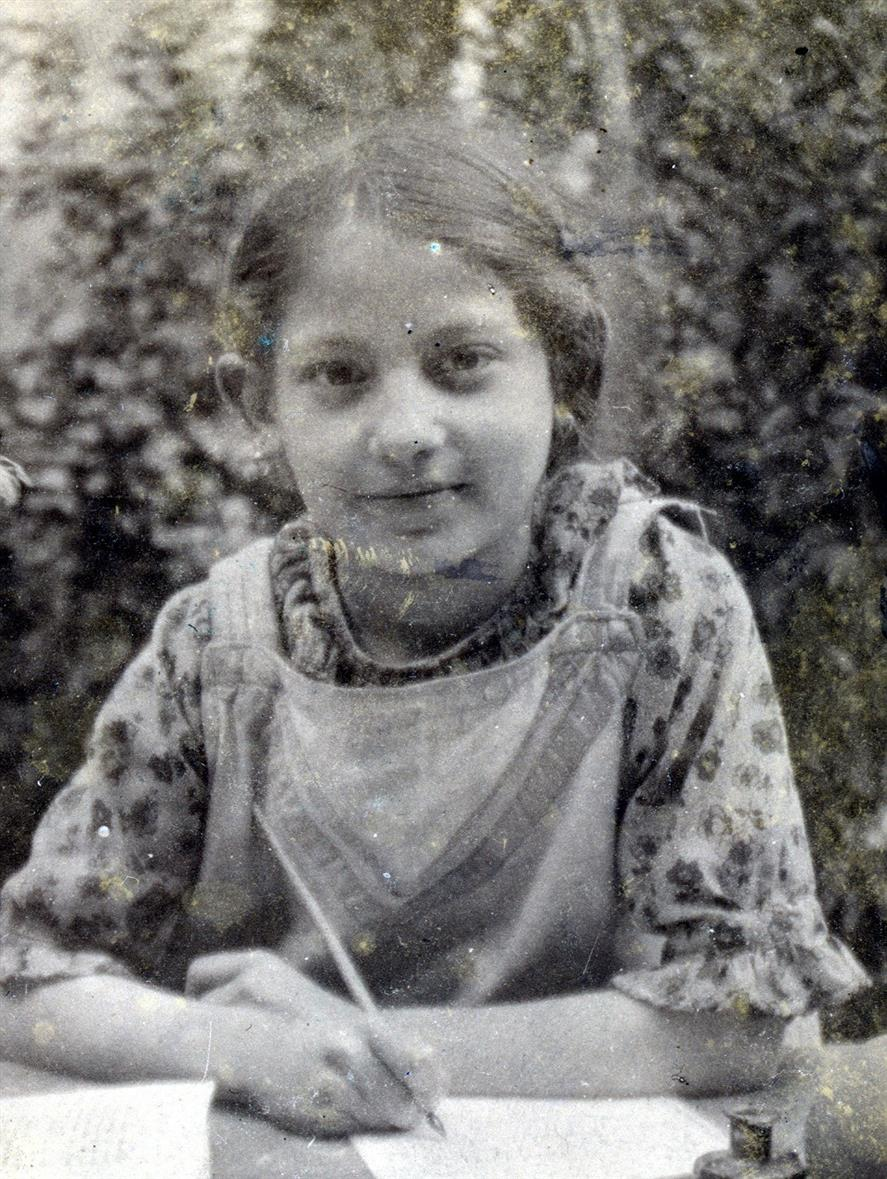

Personal information
- Born: 6 October 1905
- Died: November 1944 (aged 39) Budapest, Hungary

Chess career
- Country: Hungary

Clara Faragó (née Friedmann, 6 October 1905 – November 1944) was a Hungarian chess master. She was a Women's World Chess Championship participant (1937).

== Biography ==
She was born in a large family that moved to Hungary from Transylvania. She studied for a year in the University of Graz, then graduated from the Faculty of Law in University of Budapest and worked at the Hungarian Road Department.

In the 1920s and 1930s, Clara Faragó was one of the leading female chess players in Hungary. She was a member of Budapest Chess Club and Hungarian chess master Árpád Vajda schoolgirl. In the 2nd Unofficial Chess Olympiad women's tournament she won 4th place in the competition of eight participants. In 1936 she took 10th place in the International Women's Chess tournament in Semmering. In October 1936, she played a match with the Austrian chess master Gisela Harum and lost 1:3. In 1937, Clara Faragó participated in Women's World Chess Championship in Stockholm where she shared 10th-16th place.

She died during World War II.
