= Women's World Chess Championship 1935 =

The 5th Women's World Chess Championship took place during the 6th Chess Olympiad, held in Warsaw, Poland from 16 to 31 August 1935. The final results were as follows:

| # | Player | 1 | 2 | 3 | 4 | 5 | 6 | 7 | 8 | 9 | 10 | Points |
|---|---|---|---|---|---|---|---|---|---|---|---|---|
| 1 | Vera Menchik (TCH) | - | 1 | 1 | 1 | 1 | 1 | 1 | 1 | 1 | 1 | 9 |
| 2 | Regina Gerlecka (POL) | 0 | - | ½ | ½ | 1 | 1 | 1 | ½ | 1 | 1 | 6½ |
| 3 | Gisela Harum (AUT) | 0 | ½ | - | ½ | 1 | 1 | 1 | 1 | 0 | 1 | 6 |
| 4 | Olga Menchik (TCH) | 0 | ½ | ½ | - | ½ | ½ | ½ | 1 | 1 | 1 | 5½ |
| 5 | Helen Thierry (DEN) | 0 | 0 | 0 | ½ | - | 1 | 1 | ½ | 1 | 1 | 5 |
| 6 | Edith Holloway (ENG) | 0 | 0 | 0 | ½ | 0 | - | 1 | 0 | 1 | 1 | 3½ |
| 7 | Róża Herman (POL) | 0 | 0 | 0 | ½ | 0 | 0 | - | 1 | 1 | 1 | 3½ |
| 8 | Carthy Skjönsberg (NOR) | 0 | ½ | 0 | 0 | ½ | 1 | 0 | - | 1 | 0 | 3 |
| 9 | Natalia Kowalska (POL) | 0 | 0 | 1 | 0 | 0 | 0 | 0 | 0 | - | ½ | 1½ |
| 10 | A. M. S. O'Shannon (IRL) | 0 | 0 | 0 | 0 | 0 | 0 | 0 | 1 | ½ | - | 1½ |
