= Barbara Flerow-Bułhak =

Polish chess player

Personal information
- Born: 23 May 1914
- Died: August 1944 (aged 30) Warsaw, Occupied Poland

Chess career
- Country: Poland

Barbara Flerow-Bułhak (23 May 1914 – August 1944) was a Polish chess master. She was a Women's World Chess Championship participant (1937). She was killed in the Warsaw Uprising.

== Biography ==
Barbara Flerow-Bułhak participated in the first two finals of the Polish Women's Chess Championship. In 1935, she ranked 7th place, while in 1937 she won the title of Polish Women's Chess vice-champion (both finals were played in Warsaw). Also she participated in the Warsaw Women's Chess Championship twice, where in 1936 she ranked 2nd place, and in 1937 she shared together with Regina Gerlecka 1st – 2nd place.

In 1937 in Stockholm she participated in the Women's World Chess Championship and shared 17th - 20th place (tournament won by Vera Menchik).

She was killed during the Warsaw Uprising, aged 30. She was exhumed in 1946 and reinterred in Warsaw Insurgents Cemetery.
