= Róża Herman =

Polish chess player

Roza Herman
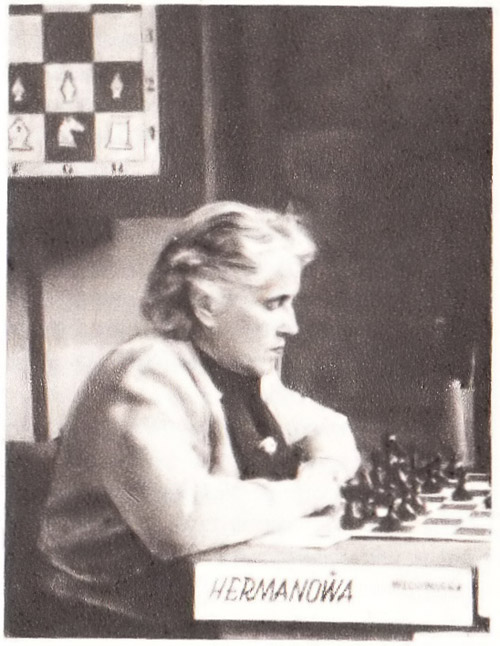
- Country: Poland
- Born: January 16, 1902; Łódź, Poland
- Died: March 7, 1995 (aged 93); Łódź, Poland
- Title: International Woman Master (1950)

Róża Maria Herman (16 January 1902 – 7 March 1995) was a Polish chess player. She was awarded the title International Woman Master by FIDE in 1950.

In June 1935, she took 4th place at the first Polish women's championship, held in Warsaw, which Regina Gerlecka won. Two months later, Herman tied for 6th at the 5th Women's World Championship in Warsaw (Vera Menchik won).

In 1936, she participated in the women's international tournament in Semmering, Austria, won by Sonja Graf. Herman finished 11th. The next year, she finished 6th in the second Polish women's championship, won by Gerlecka again. In August 1937, Herman tied for 10-16th at the 6th Women's World Championship in Stockholm (Vera Menchik won). In 1939, she tied for 1st-2nd with Gerlecka at the Warsaw women's championship.

After World War II, Herman took 16th at the Women's World Championship in Moscow 1949/50 (Ludmila Rudenko won). She was twice Polish women's champion at Łódź 1949 and Toruń 1950, and runner-up at Częstochowa 1951.

She was a doctor of medicine, and lived in Łódź, her native city.
