= Women's World Chess Championship 1931 =

The 3rd Women's World Chess Championship took place during the 4th Chess Olympiad in Prague between 12-26 July 1931. The tournament was played as a double round-robin tournament. Vera Menchik successfully defended her title. The final results were as follows:

#	Player	1	2	3	4	5	Total
1	Vera Menchik (TCH)	-	1 1	1 1	1 1	1 1	8
2	Paula Wolf-Kalmar (AUT)	0 0	-	0 1	0 1	1 1	4
3	Agnes Stevenson (ENG)	0 0	1 0	-	1 ½	1 0	3½
4	Katarina Beskow (SWE)	0 0	1 0	0 ½	-	1 0	2½
5	Wally Henschel (GER)	0 0	0 0	0 1	0 1	-	2
