= Florence Frankland Thomson =

Scottish chess player

Personal information
- Born: Florence Frankland Wilson; 8 December 1885 Glasgow, Scotland
- Died: 2 July 1939 (aged 53) Glasgow, Scotland

Chess career
- Country: Scotland

Florence Frankland Thomson (8 December 1885 – 2 July 1939, born Florence Frankland Wilson) was a Scottish chess master. She was Women's World Chess Championship participant (1937). She was a six-times winner the Scottish Women's Chess Championship (1929, 1930, 1932, 1933, 1934, 1937).

== Early life ==
She was born in Glasgow in 1885.

== Career ==
In the 1920s Thomson joined Glasgow Ladies' Chess Club. She was champion of the club on several occasions. Thomson also was Glasgow Ladies' Chess Club president but only a few weeks before her death she was elected vice-president for the second time. Thomson was also champion of Glasgow Polytechnic Chess Club on two occasions. She six times participated and each time won the Scottish Women's Chess Championships: 1929, 1930, 1932, 1933, 1934 and 1937.

Thomson also participated in the British Women's Chess Championship when she shared 3rd–4th place in 1935, and shared 2nd-3rd place in 1936, and won 2nd place in both the 1937 and 1938 tournaments. In 1937, Thomson participated in Women's World Chess Championship in Stockholm where with Ingrid Larsen shared 21st–22nd place.

Thomson was the first female insurance broker in Scotland.

== Personal life ==
Florence Frankland Wilson married William Thomson, and had a son. She died in 1939, aged 53, in Glasgow. Her son Alexander Aird Thomson (1917–1991) was also a chess player; he won the Scottish Men's Chess Championship in 1951 and represented Scotland three times at Chess Olympiad (1956, 1958, 1964).
