= Natalia Kowalska (chess player) =

Polish chess player

Personal information
- Born: 1918 Warsaw, Poland
- Died: unknown

Chess career
- Country: Poland

Natalia Kowalska (1918 – unknown) was a Polish chess master. She was a Women's World Chess Championship participant (1935).

== Biography ==
In 1935, Natalia Kowalska participated in the first final of the Polish Women's Chess Championship and ranked 5th place. Also she participated in the Warsaw Women's Chess Championship twice, where in 1935 Natalia Kowalska ranked 2nd place, and in 1936 she shared 6th – 8th place.

In 1935, in Warsaw Natalia Kowalska participated in the Women's World Chess Championship and shared 9th - 10th place (tournament won by Vera Menchik).
