= Women's World Chess Championship 1930 =

The 2nd Women's World Chess Championship took place during the 3rd Chess Olympiad in Hamburg. The tournament was played as a double round-robin tournament. Vera Menchik successfully defended her title. She lost her only ever Women's World Championship game to Wally Henschel. The final results were as follows:

	Player	1	2	3	4	5	Total
1	Vera Menchik (TCH)	-	½ 1	0 1	1 1	1 1	6½
2	Paula Wolf-Kalmar (AUT)	½ 0	-	1 0	1 1	1 1	5½
3	Wally Henschel (GER)	1 0	0 1	-	1 1	0 ½	4½
4	Katarina Beskow (SWE)	0 0	0 0	0 0	-	1 1	2
5	Agnes Stevenson (ENG)	0 0	0 0	1 ½	0 0	-	1½
