= Berna Carrasco =

Chilean chess player (1914–2013)

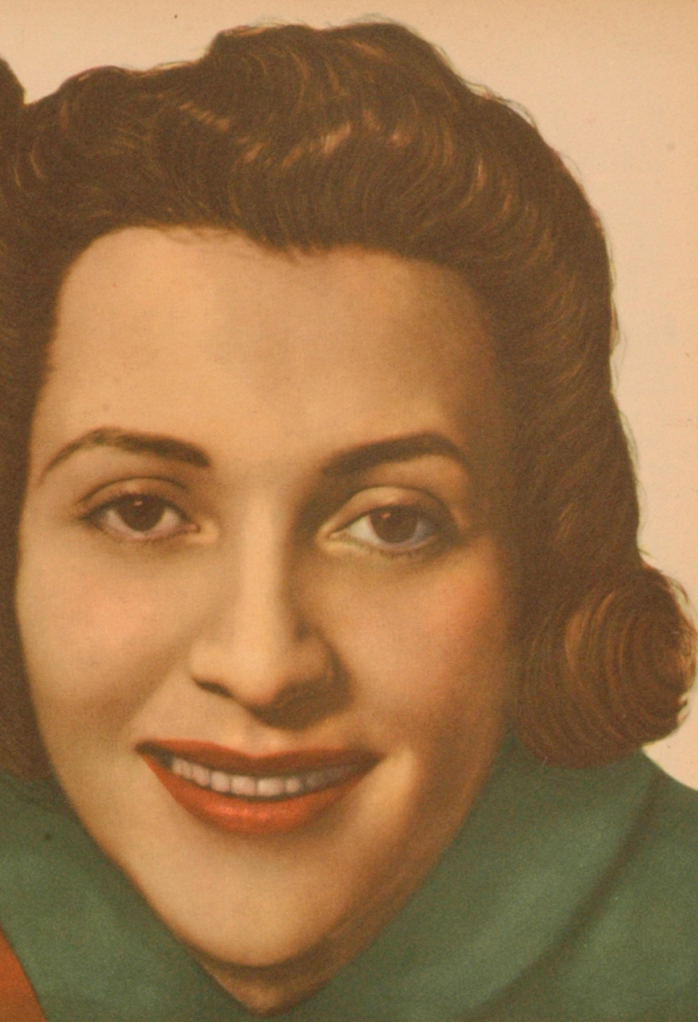
- Carrasco pictured in El Gráfico, 1939
- Full name: Berna Carrasco Araya
- Born: 19 December 1914
- Died: 7 July 2013 (aged 98)
- Title: Woman International Master (1954)

Berna Carrasco Araya (Carrasco de Budinich) (19 December 1914 – 7 July 2013) was a Chilean chess master, born in San Bernardo, Chile. At the 1939 Women's World Championship in Buenos Aires, she finished in third place behind Vera Menchik and Sonja Graf. Carrasco was awarded the Woman International Master (WIM) title in 1954.
