= 2nd unofficial Chess Olympiad =

Chess tournament in Budapest

The second unofficial Chess Olympiad was a team chess tournament held in Budapest from June 26 to July 15, 1926, during the third FIDE Congress. Six teams applied to contest the team tournament but Austria and Czechoslovakia withdrew before the start. Hungary won the tournament ahead of Yugoslavia, Romania and Germany.

Several individual tournaments which also featured international participation were held at the Congress. Ernst Grünfeld of Austria and Mario Monticelli of Italy won the strongest individual event, a sixteen-player round robin sometimes referred to as the first "FIDE Masters" tournament. Another sixteen players of mixed local and international backgrounds competed in a second round robin, won by Max Walter of Czechoslovakia. Edith Holloway of the UK won the women's tournament, and Sandor Zinner won an open tournament contested by the local Hungarians.

== Results ==
The final results were as follows:

=== Team Tournament ===
#	Team	Players	Points
1	Hungary	E. Steiner, Vajda, Sterk, Négyesy, Bakonyi, S. Zinner	9
2	Kingdom of Serbs, Croats and Slovenes	Kostić, Asztalos, Ćirić, György	8
3	Romania	Balogh, Bródy, Tyroler, Mendelssohn, Proca	5
4	Germany	Moritz, Schönmann, Machate, Rüster	2

=== First FIDE Masters ===
#	Player	Points	Berger
1	Ernst Grünfeld (AUT)	9½	68.00
1	Mario Monticelli (ITA)	9½	65.25
3	Hans Kmoch (AUT)	9	67.00
3	Sándor Takács (HUN)	9	63.50
3	Akiba Rubinstein (POL)	9	63.25
6	Géza Nagy (HUN)	8½	
7	Richard Réti (TCH)	8	56.75
8	Edgard Colle (BEL)	8	54.50
9	Hermanis Matisons (LAT)	7½	59.25
10	Savielly Tartakower (POL)	7½	56.75
11	Árpád Vajda (HUN)	6½	
12	Frederick Yates (ENG)	6	44.00
13	Endre Steiner (HUN)	6	42.75
14	Kornél Havasi (HUN)	6	41.75
15	Ladislav Prokeš (TCH)	5½	
16	Eugène Znosko-Borovsky (FRA)	4½	

=== Mixed tournament ===
Max Walter of Bratislava won this sixteen-player round robin with a score of 11½ out of 15. Balázs Sárközy of Budapest finished in second place with a score of 10½, and Anatoly Chepurnov of Vyborg scored 9½ to finish third.

=== Women's tournament ===
Eight women from London, Vienna and Budapest competed in a round robin. Edith Holloway of London won the tournament scoring 6½ out of 7, while Paula Wolf-Kalmar and Gisela Harum of Vienna both scored 5½ to tie for second and third places.
