= Proca =

Proca is a surname. Notable people with the surname include:

- Alexandru Proca, Romanian physicist
  - Proca action, in physics, named after Alexandru Proca
- Eugeniu Gh. Proca, Romanian physician
- Nicolae Proca, Romanian footballer
- Zeno Proca (1906–1936), Romanian chess player

== See also ==
- Procas, a king in Roman mythology
- Procas granulicollis, a beetle in the family Curculionidae
