= Nelly Fišerová =

Czech chess player

Personal information
- Born: 23 June 1905
- Died: after 3 November 1941 (aged 36)

Chess career
- Country: Czechoslovakia

Nelly Fišerová (also written as Fischerová; 23 June 1905 – after 3 November 1941) was a Czech chess master. She was Women's World Chess Championship participant (1937).

She lived in Mladá Boleslav, where in Rudolf Charousek named chess club Nelly Fišerová became for one of the leading Czechoslovak chess female players. In 1937, contrary to the decision of Czechoslovak chess federation, she participated in Women's World Chess Championship in Stockholm, where shared the 6th-7th place with Mona May Karff.

During World War II she had been repressed. In 1941, Nazi Germany authorities sent Fišerová to a concentration camp where she died.
