= Wally Henschel =

German chess player

Personal information
- Born: 9 September 1893 Hamburg, Germany
- Died: 13 December 1988 (aged 95) Miami, United States

Chess career
- Country: Germany; United States

Wally Henschel (9 September 1893 – 13 December 1988) was a German chess master who also lived in the United States. She was Women's World Chess Championship bronze medalist (1930).

== Biography ==
Wally Henschel was born in a Jewish family. She had a musical education. She was a singer and worked on piano lessons. In 1927 she received a diploma of a singing teacher, and in 1929 successfully passed the exam for suitability for the stage profession in the opera genre. After the National Socialists rise to power in Germany, she emigrated to the United States in March 1939. There in the mid-1950s she became an invalid and, until her death, lived on a disability pension.

Twice participated in Women's World Chess Championship tournaments. She was third in 1930 in Hamburg and fifth in 1931 in Prague. Her victory in 1930 over the current world champion Vera Menchik was the only defeat of Menchik in all Women's World Chess Championships.

== Notable chess game ==
Wally Henschel – Vera Menchik
Women's World Chess Championship 1930, Hamburg

1. d4 Nf6 2. c4 g6 3. Nc3 Bg7 4. Nf3 0–0 5. e4 d6 6. Be2 Nbd7 7. 0–0 e5 8. Bg5 h6 9. dxe5 dxe5 10. Bh4 c6 11. Qd2 Re8 12. Rfd1 Qb6 13. Bf1 Nh5 14. b3 Nf4 15. Na4 Qc7 16. Rac1 Ne6 17. Nc3 Nd4 18. Ne1 Nf8 19. f3 Be6 20. Nc2 Kh7 21. Nxd4 exd4 22. Ne2 c5 23. Nf4 Be5 24. Bg3 Qd6 25. Bd3 b6 26. Ne2 Bxg3 27. Nxg3 a5 28. a4 Bc8 29. Rf1 Ra7 30. Rce1 Rae7 31. f4 Bb7 32. e5 Qb8 33. Nh5 Nd7 34. f5 Rf8 35. fxg6+ fxg6 36. e6 Ne5 37. Rxf8 Qxf8 38. Rxe5 Bc8 39. Nf4 Qf6 40. Nxg6 Rg7 41. Rh5 1–0.
