= Janeček =

Janeček (feminine: Janečková) is a Czech surname. It is a diminutive form of the given name Jan. Notable people with the surname include:

- Blažena Janečková (1911–1961), Czech chess master
- Clarence Janecek (1911–1990), American football player
- Dieter Janecek (born 1976), German politician
- František Janeček (1878–1941), Czech engineer
- Gustav Janeček (1848–1929), Czech-Croatian chemist and pharmacist
- Ivana Janečková (born 1984), Czech cross-country skier
- Karel Janeček (born 1973), Czech mathematician and entrepreneur
- Patricia Janečková (1998–2023), Slovak opera singer
- Pavel Janeček (born 1994), Czech swimmer
- Václav Janeček (1929–1991), Czech sprinter

== See also ==
- John Janecek House
