= Blažena Janečková =

Czech chess player (1911–1961)

Personal information
- Born: 3 February 1911
- Died: 1961

Chess career
- Country: Czechoslovakia

Blažena Janečková (3 February 1911 – 1961) was a Czech chess master. She was Bohemia and Moravia Women's Chess Champion (1940). She was Women's World Chess Championship participant (1939).

== Biography ==
In 1937 Janečková won the Czech Women's Chess Championship. In 1938 she finished second in the Czechoslovak Women's Chess Championship. In 1939 she participated in the Women's World Chess Championship in Buenos Aires and tied for 9–10th place (tournament won by Vera Menchik). After returning to her homeland from the Women's World Championship in Argentina, Janečková won the Women's Chess Championship in Bohemia and Moravia in 1940. In early 1941 Janečková was arrested by the Gestapo because she was a member by Communist Party of Czechoslovakia and worked in the Czech intelligence resistance group founded by Julius Fučík. She spent four years in the concentration camp.

After the liberation Janečková was a member of the editorial board of chess journal Československý šach. After World War II she also continued to participate in chess tournaments. In 1946 Janečková was finished the second and in 1952 was the fourth in the Czechoslovak Women's Chess Championship. After 1952, Janečková had to leave active chess activities for health reasons and worked at the Czechoslovak Trade Office in Rio de Janeiro.
