= Négyesy =

Négyesy is a Hungarian surname. Notable people with the surname include:

- György Négyesy (1893–1992), Hungarian chess master
- János Négyesy (1938–2013), Hungarian violinist
