= Agnes Stevenson =

British chess player (1873–1935)

Agnes Lawson-Stevenson
- Stevenson in 1931

Personal information
- Born: Agnes Bradley Lawson c. 23 November 1873 Stranton, Hartlepool, England
- Died: 20 August 1935 (aged 61) Poznań, Poland

Chess career
- Country: Britain

Agnes Lawson-Stevenson (born Agnes Bradley Lawson, November 1873 – 20 August 1935) was a British chess player. She was four-time British Ladies' Champion (1920, 1925, 1926, 1930), and married to Rufus Henry Streatfeild Stevenson, home news editor of the British Chess Magazine, secretary of the Southern Counties Chess Union and match captain of the Kent County Chess Association.

She took 3rd at Meran 1924 (unofficial European women's championship, Helene Cotton and Edith Holloway won). After the tournament three of the participants (Holloway, Cotton and Stevenson) defeated three others (Paula Wolf-Kalmar, Gülich and Pohlner) in a double-round London vs. Vienna match.

She was thrice the Women's World Championship Challenger. She tied for 9-11th at London 1927, took 5th at Hamburg 1930, and took 3rd at Prague 1931. On the way to play in the 1935 Women's World Championship, she left the aircraft in Poznań to complete a passport check. She returned to the aircraft from the front and ran into the propeller and was killed.

Her husband was remarried in 1937 to Women's World Chess Champion, Vera Menchik, who was herself killed just a few years later in 1944.
