= Martha Daunke =

German chess player

Personal information
- Born: November 1899 Breslau, Poland
- Died: 1967 (aged 67–68)

Chess career
- Country: Germany; East Germany

Martha Daunke (November 1899 – 1967) was a German chess player. She was a participant within the Women's World Chess Championship of 1927.

== Biography ==
In 1927, Martha Daunke participated within the first Women's World Chess Championship, where she had ranked up in the 12th place. In 1939, Martha Daunke was a participant of the first German Women's Chess Championship in Stuttgart where she had ranked 5th place. In 1943, she ranked 6th in German Women's Chess Championship.

After World War II, Martha Daunke participated in the East German Women's Chess Championship, which was the best result achieved inside the Soviet occupation zone. Within the Women's Chess Championship in 1948 that was held at Bad Doberan, she shared the 1st place and had only lost in an additional match with Gertrud Nüsken. She participated in the East German Women's Chess Championships by the end of the 1950s.
