= Women's World Chess Championship 1937 match =

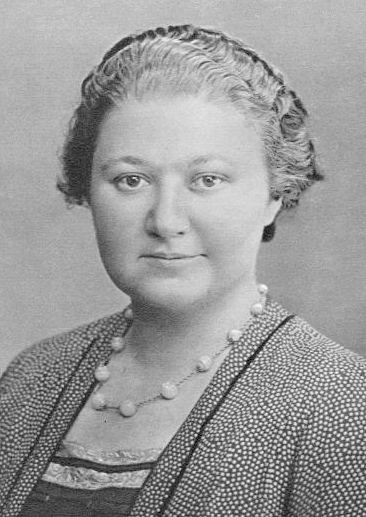
Vera Menchik in 1933

The Women's World Chess Championship 1937 match was a FIDE-recognized Women's World Chess Championship held in 1937; it was won by Vera Menchik.

After their 1934 match (won +3 =0 -1 by Menchik), reigning Women's World Chess Champion Vera Menchik and Sonja Graf played a championship match in Semmering from June 26 to July 17, 1937.

This time the match consisted of 16 games. Menchik was again the favourite and once again left no doubt about who was the strongest female player in the world at the time, clinching the match by a convincing nine wins, five draws, and two losses (11½–4½).

Like the 1934 match, this match was arranged by the two players themselves (much like the open title at the time), but approved and recognized by FIDE.

== Background ==
In 1934, reigning Women's World Chess Champion Vera Menchik was challenged by Sonja Graf, another female player who, like Menchik, regularly competed with men in open tournaments. The match was played in Rotterdam, in Max Euwe´s residence, over four games. Menchik was a huge favourite beforehand, but Graf caused a small sensation by winning the first game. Menchik then won the other three, however, to successfully defend her title.

The match was arranged at the personal initiative of two players (much like the open title at the time) and not under the auspices of FIDE.

1934 match
	1	2	3	4	Points
Vera Menchik (Czechoslovakia)	0	1	1	1	3
Sonja Graf (Germany)	1	0	0	0	1
