= Alexander Aird Thomson =

Scottish chess player (1917–1991)

Personal information
- Born: 21 February 1917 Glasgow, Scotland
- Died: 05/06.1991 Mortlake, England

Chess career
- Country: United Kingdom

Alexander Aird Thomson (21 February 1917 – May/June 1991) was a Scottish chess player, Scottish Chess Championship winner (1951).

== Biography ==
Son of Florence Frankland Thomson (1885–1939) who was six-times winner the Scottish Women's Chess Championships.

Alexander Aird Thomson twice in row won Scottish Boys' Chess Championships (1932, 1933). He was a member of Polytechnic Chess Club in Glasgow and five-times won this club championship (1937 (shared), 1947, 1949, 1950, 1951, 1952 (shared)). Together with Polytechnic Chess Club Alexander Aird Thomson won Richardson Cup in 1952. In 1951 he won Scottish Chess Championships after play-off.

Alexander Aird Thomson played for Scotland in the Chess Olympiads:

- In 1956, at fourth board in the 12th Chess Olympiad in Moscow (+1, =7, -5),
- In 1958, at second reserve board in the 13th Chess Olympiad in Munich (+3, =4, -2),
- In 1964, at second reserve board in the 16th Chess Olympiad in Tel Aviv (+0, =1, -3).

Alexander Aird Thomson lived in London from 1954 and worked in the book trade all his life. He won the Richmond & Twickenham Chess Club championship in 1956 and 1962. Also Alexander Aird Thomson represented the club in the London League until his death. He married in 1961 to Susan Mary Thomson (née Hamilton). His wife won the Scottish Women's Chess Championship in 1965.

Alexander Aird Thomson was found dead in his flat on 5 June 1991 after neighbours had not seen him for some weeks.
