= Bruno Moritz =

German-Ecuadorian chess player

Personal information
- Born: January 10, 1898 Neuwarp (Nowe Warpno)
- Died: December 17, 1966 (aged 68) Hamburg

Chess career
- Country: Germany, Ecuador
- Title: Master

Bruno Moritz (born January 10, 1898, – November 17, 1966) was a German–Ecuadorian chess master.

He shared 1st at Bad Oeynhausen 1922 (Hauptturnier B), took 10th at Frankfurt 1923 (the 23rd DSB Congress, Ernst Grünfeld won), took 12th at Breslau 1925 (the 24th DSB-Congress, Efim Bogoljubow won), took 12th at Vienna 1926 (DSV-Kongress won by Karl Gilg and Heinrich Wagner), won at Stargard 1926, shared 2nd, behind Fritz Sämisch, at Stettin 1930, took 13th at Swinemünde 1931 (the 27th DSB-Congress, Bogoljubow and Ludwig Rödl won), and tied for 6-7th at Swinemünde 1932 (Gösta Stoltz won).

In the 1930s, he emigrated from Germany because of Nazi policy.

Moritz played for Germany in 2nd unofficial Chess Olympiad at Budapest 1926, and for Ecuador in the 16th Chess Olympiad at Tel Aviv 1964.
