= Florence Hutchison-Stirling =

Scottish chess player

Personal information
- Born: 1858 London, England
- Died: 6 May 1948 (aged 89–90) Burntisland, Scotland

Chess career
- Country: Scotland

Florence Hutchison-Stirling (1858 – 6 May 1948) was a Scottish chess player. She was a participant the Women's World Chess Championship 1927.

== Biography ==
Florence Hutchison-Stirling was one of five daughters and two sons of James Hutchison Stirling (1820 – 1909), Scottish idealist philosopher. She started played chess around the age of eight or nine, reaching such a level that her father, who had an interest in various board games. Florence Hutchison-Stirling was a member of Edinburgh Ladies' Chess Club, and supported the activities of the Scottish Ladies' Chess Association (founded in 1905). She was a five-time winner the Scottish Women's Chess Championship (1905, 1906, 1907, 1912, 1913). Also Florence Hutchison-Stirling was one of the first women to compete in Scottish Men's Chess Championship (1925, 1927). She played in several British Women's Chess Championships where in 1913 she shared 1st place but lost play-off, and in 1923 she shared 2nd - 5th place. In 1923, in Portsmouth she drew with Alexander Alekhine in simultaneous exhibition on 37 boards. In 1927, Florence Hutchison-Stirling participated in first Women's World Chess Championship where she ranked 8th place.
