= Women's World Chess Championship 1939 =

The 7th Women's World Chess Championship took place during the 1939 Olympiad in Buenos Aires. The final results were as follows:

	Player	1	2	3	4	5	6	7	8	9	10	11	12	13	14	15	16	17	18	19	20	Points
1	Vera Menchik (United Kingdom)	-	1	1	1	1	½	1	1	½	1	1	1	1	1	1	1	1	1	1	1	18
2	Sonja Graf (stateless)	0	-	0	1	0	1	1	1	1	1	1	1	1	1	1	1	1	1	1	1	16
3	Berna Carrasco (Chile)	0	1	-	0	1	1	1	1	1	1	1	0	1	½	1	1	1	1	1	1	15½
4	Elfriede Rinder (Germany)	0	0	1	-	1	½	1	1	1	1	1	½	1	1	1	1	0	1	1	1	15
5	Mona May Karff (United States)	0	1	0	0	-	1	1	½	1	½	1	1	1	1	0	1	1	1	1	1	14
6	Milda Lauberte (Latvia)	½	0	0	½	0	-	1	½	½	1	½	1	½	1	1	1	½	1	1	½	12
7	María Teresa Mora (Cuba)	0	0	0	0	0	0	-	1	½	0	1	1	1	1	1	½	1	1	1	1	11
8	Catharina Roodzant (Netherlands)	0	0	0	0	½	½	0	-	½	1	½	1	1	½	1	½	1	1	1	1	11
9	Paulette Schwartzmann (France)	½	0	0	0	0	½	½	½	-	½	½	1	½	½	½	½	0	1	1	1	9
10	Blažena Janečková (Bohemia and Moravia)	0	0	0	0	½	0	1	0	½	-	½	1	1	1	½	0	1	1	0	1	9
11	Ingrid Larsen (Denmark)	0	0	0	0	0	½	0	½	½	½	-	½	1	1	1	0	0	1	1	1	8½
12	Dora Trepat de Navarro (Argentina)	0	0	1	½	0	0	0	0	0	0	½	-	½	1	½	½	½	1	1	1	8
13	Ingeborg Andersson (Sweden)	0	0	0	0	0	½	0	0	½	0	0	½	-	½	½	1	1	1	1	1	7½
14	Salome Reischer (Palestine)	0	0	½	0	0	0	0	½	½	0	0	0	½	-	1	1	1	0	1	1	7
15	María Berea de Montero (Argentina)	0	0	0	0	1	0	0	0	½	½	0	½	½	0	-	1	½	1	½	1	7
16	Marianne Stoffels (Belgium)	0	0	0	0	0	0	½	½	½	1	1	½	0	0	0	-	1	1	½	½	7
17	María A. de Vigil (Uruguay)	0	0	0	1	0	½	0	0	1	0	1	½	0	0	½	0	-	0	½	1	6
18	Elena Raclauskienė (Lithuania)	0	0	0	0	0	0	0	0	0	0	0	0	0	1	0	0	1	-	½	1	3½
19	Ruth Bloch Nakkerud (Norway)	0	0	0	0	0	0	0	0	0	1	0	0	0	0	½	½	½	½	-	0	3
20	Anabelle Lougheed (Canada)	0	0	0	0	0	½	0	0	0	0	0	0	0	0	0	½	0	0	1	-	2

As a result of her outspoken defiance of Hitler's government, Sonja Graf was taken off the list of German participants and played in the women's tournament under the flag of the fictitious country "Libre" ("free" in Spanish).

Graf and Paulette Schwartzmann, along with many of the male players, chose to stay in South America, as World War II broke out during the tournament.

Due to the outbreak of war, there was no Women's World Chess Championship for the next ten years. Meanwhile, Menchik died in England in 1944 in a German air raid, so the next championship in 1949–50 had to determine a new champion.
