= Regina Gerlecka =

Polish chess player

Regina Gerlecka (2 March 1913 – 12 March 1983) was a Polish chess player.

In January 1935, she won the Warsaw championships. In June, Gerlecka won the inaugural Polish women's championship, which took place in Warsaw. Two months later, she finished second, behind Vera Menchik, in the 5th Women's World Chess Championship, held alongside the 6th Chess Olympiad (known as the International Team Tournament back then), also held in Warsaw.

She tied for 5-7th places in the women's super-tournament at Semmering 1936, won by Sonja Graf. Gerlecka was again Polish women's champion in 1937, having shared 1st-2nd with Barbara Flerow-Bułhak. In August 1937, she tied for 10-16th in the Women's World Championship in Stockholm, which was won by Vera Menchik again. In 1939, Gerlecka tied for 1st-2nd with Róża Herman in the Warsaw championships.

After World War II, she took 3rd at the three-player 1949 Polish women's championship in Łódź, won by Róża Herman.
