= Elek Bakonyi =

Hungarian chess player (1904–1982)

Personal information
- Born: 20 February 1904 Budapest, Hungary
- Died: 2 March 1982 (aged 78) Budapest, Hungary

Chess career
- Country: Hungary

Elek Bakonyi (20 February 1904 – 2 March 1982) was a Hungarian chess player, chess theoretician and coach, unofficial Chess Olympiad winner (1926).

== Life and chess career ==
Bakonyi father was a lawyer, and mother a music teacher. At the age of just 21, he was attacked by a serious illness, as a result of which he suffered a 70% hearing loss. Shortly after his marriage, he moved to Abony with his wife's parents, and for more than a decade he turned his back on competitive chess and earned his living as a hairdresser. After World War II, he moved back to the capital and immediately got involved in chess life. In his first competition, the Havasi Kornél Memorial Tournament, he fulfill the national chess master's norm at the age of 42.

Bakonyi was a resident of Pestújhely, who taught chess to several generations. He was a competitor in the Vasas chess division for twenty-three years. Later, he became the coach of the local chess club team. In his memory, a commemorative chess tournament is organized as part of the Pestújhely Days.

At the Hungarian Chess Championship, he took 2nd-3rd place in 1946, and 3rd place in 1951.

He won Hungarian Team Chess Championship with Vasas (1952).

It is named after the Bakonyi version of the Sicilian Defence (B27):[10] 1. e4 c5 2. Nf3 g6 3. d4 Bg7. He proved the playability of the version with numerous valuable analyses, and the power of surprise was often effective.

Among others, his student was Grandmaster István Bilek.

=== Player power ===
According to Chessmetrics historical score calculations, Bakonyi highest live score was 2583 in January 1952, ranking him 68th in the world at the time. His highest ranking in the world ranking was 65th, which he achieved in June 1952.

=== Team chess ===
He was a member of the Hungarian national team that won the Olympic championship at the 2nd unofficial Chess Olympiad (1926).

In 1947, he was a member of the Hungarian team that won 1st place at the Balkan Team Championship.

In 1948, as a member of the Hungarian national team, he took 1st place at the Workers' Chess Olympiad.

In 1949, he played on the 1st board in the Hungary-Netherlands national team match and achieved 1 win and 1 loss, in a match won by the Hungarian national team with a score 12,5 : 7,5.

He was a member of the Vasas chess team that won the Hungarian championship in 1952.

=== Individual results ===
- 2nd - 3rd place in Hungarian Chess Championship (1946)
- 3rd place Hungarian Chess Championship (1951);
- 1st place in Győr chess tournament (1956).

== Awards ==
- Worthy Athlete of the Hungarian People's Republic (1954);
- Excellent Worker of Physical Education and Sports (1964).
