= Zeno Proca =

Romanian chess player

Personal information
- Born: 1906
- Died: 15 February 1936

Chess career
- Country: Romania

Zeno Proca (1906 – 15 February 1936) was a Romanian chess player, two-times Romanian Chess Championship medalist (1926, 1927), unofficial Chess Olympiad team bronze medal winner (1926).

== Biography ==
Zeno Proca was one of the strongest chess players of Romania in the end of 1920s. He was repeated participant in first third Romanian Chess Championships (1926, 1927, 1929) and won silver (1926) and bronze (1927) medals.

Zeno Proca played for Romania in the unofficial Chess Olympiad:

- In 1926, at fourth board in the 2nd unofficial Chess Olympiad in Budapest (+1, =2, -0) and won team bronze medal.

Zeno Proca played for Romania in the Chess Olympiad:

- In 1928, at second board in the 2nd Chess Olympiad in The Hague (+3, =7, -6).
