= Gisela Harum =

Austrian chess player

Gisela Harum (1903 – 1995) was an Austrian chess player.

She played four times in the Women's World Championship. She took 7th at London 1927 (Vera Menchik won), 3rd (behind V. Menchik and Regina Gerlecka) at Warsaw 1935, and tied for 17-20th at Stockholm 1937 (V. Menchik won).

She was unable to participate at the Women's World Chess Championship 1933 in Folkestone due to financial reasons. Even though she was set to play, the Austrian Chess Federation Österreichischer Schachverband was unable to pay her expenses. The Olympiad team members of Austria also had to travel on their own cost but were able to collect enough money.
