= György Négyesy =

Hungarian chess player

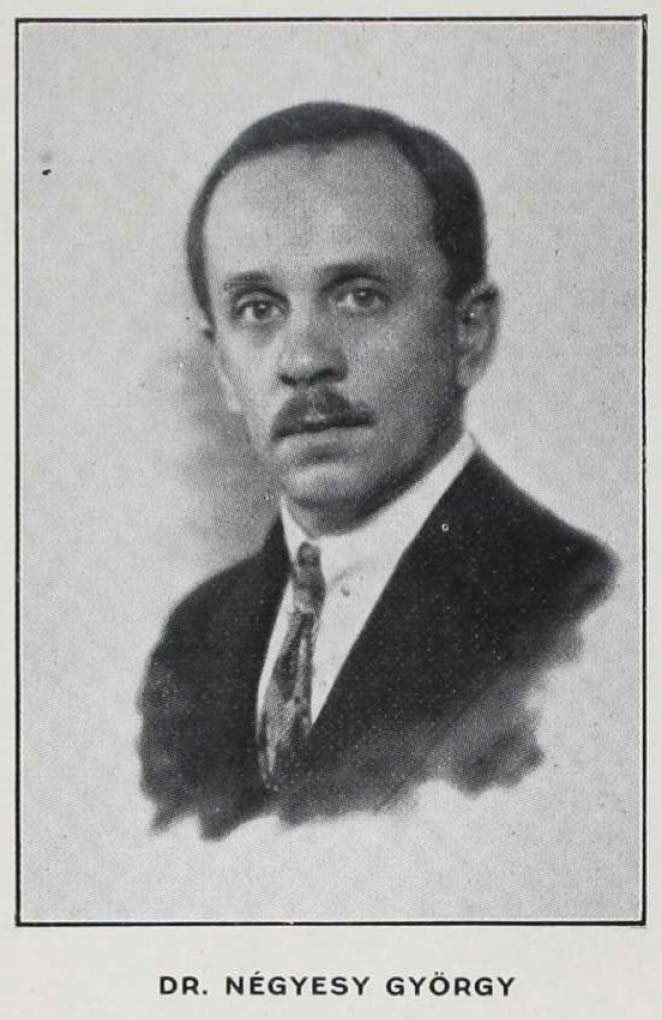

Personal information
- Born: 10 May 1893
- Died: 14 April 1992 (aged 98) Budapest, Hungary

Chess career
- Country: Hungary

György Négyesy (10 May 1893 – 14 April 1992) was a Hungarian chess player, chess journalist and official, unofficial Chess Olympiad winner (1926).

== Life ==
György Négyesy was the son of László Négyesy, a university professor of literary history and member of the Hungarian Academy of Sciences. At the age of six, he learned to play chess from his father. In 1910 he took third place at the school chess championships. Two years later, his chess game was published in print for the first time. He studied law, completed his studies in 1914 and received a doctorate in this subject in 1917. He was appointed judge in 1920 and worked at a court in Budapest until his retirement in 1951. For decades he was among the top 20 chess players in the country, appeared on the national team eight times and competed for almost 70 years. In retirement he took over the organization and management of the Hungarian correspondence chess. He also regularly wrote articles for magazines of the Hungarian Chess Association Sakkélet and Levelezési sakkhíradó, as well as books on the subject of chess. His book Sakk-kombinációk has been translated into German, English and Italian. In the last years of his life he suffered from hearing and visual impairment.

György Négyesy was buried on April 24, 1992, at the New Public Cemetery in Budapest.

== Chess career ==
Initially, Négyesy only played close chess in national tournaments. From 1932 to 1952 he took part in the finals of the Hungarian Chess Championships six times. In 1932 he finished tied for eighth place with 8.5 points from 17 games and became National Master title. Between 1925 and 1937 he was called up to the national team several times. In 1926 he won the second unofficial Chess Olympiad in Budapest with the Hungarian team.

== Correspondence chess ==
In 1910 he began playing correspondence chess. He played several international matches with the Hungarian national team and took part in the Eberhardt Wilhelm Cup in 1966/70. During this period until the mid-1970s, he was one of Hungary's strongest correspondence chess players.

== Chess official ==
Négyesy took on organizational tasks in the Hungarian Correspondence Chess Federation. In particular, the promotion tournaments he initiated advanced Hungarian correspondence chess. From 1951 to 1985 he was responsible for correspondence chess reporting in the chess magazine Magyar Sakkélet. For this he was awarded the title of “Honorary Chairman of the Hungarian Correspondence Chess Friends”. In 1971 the World Correspondence Chess Federation ICCF awarded him honorary membership.

== Literature ==
- Előd Macskásy, György Négyesy: A VIII. magyar sakkbajnokság. Sport Könyvkiadó, Budapest 1953.
- György Négyesy, Klára Sárközy: Sakk-matt! Ifjúság Könyvkiadó, Budapest 1954.
- József Hegyi, György Négyesy: Sakk-kombinációk. Sport Könyvkiadó, Budapest 1956.
- József Hegyi, György Négyesy: Így kombináljunk! Sport Könyvkiadó, Budapest 1965.
- József Hegyi, György Négyesy: Ein Lehrbuch des Kombinationsspiels. Translated from Hungarian into German Bodo Starck. Verlag Das Schach-Archiv, Hamburg 1969.
