= Olga Menchik =

Czech-British chess player (1908–1944)

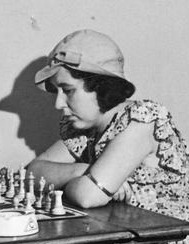
Olga Menchik

Olga Menchik (Menčíková, Menčik) Rubery (2 May 1907, Moscow – 26 June 1944, Clapham, London) was a Czech-British female chess master.

Born in Moscow to a Czech father and a British mother, she was younger sister to Vera Menchik, the Women's World Chess Champion. The girls and their mother moved to England in 1921. In January 1927, Vera won the London ladies championship, and Olga took second place.

She took fourth place in the fifth Women's World Chess Championship at Warsaw 1935, and tied for 17–20th in the sixth WWCC at Stockholm 1937 (Vera Menchik won both events).

In 1938 she married a British man, Clifford Glanville Rubery. Olga, aged 37, her sister and their mother were killed in a bombing raid when a German V-1 flying bomb hit their home at 47 Gauden Road, Clapham, south London, in 1944.
