= Katarina Beskow =

Swedish chess player

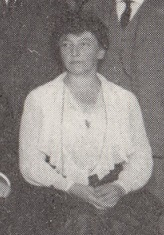

Anna Katarina Beskow or Anna Catharina Beskow (2 February 1867 in Stockholm 11 August 1939 in Salzburg) was a Swedish chess master.

She was a four-time participant in the early Women's World Chess Championship tournaments held before World War II. She took second place behind Vera Menchik at the first Women's World Championship held in London in 1927, fourth place at the second Women's World Championship held in Hamburg in 1930, fourth place at the third Women's World Championship held in Prague in 1931, and 23rd place at the 1937 Women's World Championship held in Stockholm.
