= Edith Holloway =

British chess player (1867–1956)

Edith Martha Holloway (6 December 1867 – 8 May 1956) was a volunteer nurse in Serbia during World War I and a British chess player. She was the daughter of sculptor John Denton Crittenden (1834–1877), who exhibited at the Royal Academy.

Winner of the first post-World War I British Women's Championship in 1919, she was in the prize list in several subsequent contests, taking the title for a second time in 1936 at the age of sixty-eight.

She played for England in the 1st unofficial Chess Olympiad at Paris 1924, her individual statistics being +2 −9 =2 (13 games in total, including the preliminaries). Holloway was the first woman to play in an Olympiad, and the event was notable for her defeat of Peter Potemkine, a Russian Master who had settled in France.

She shared first place with Helene Cotton at Meran 1924 (unofficial European women's championship). After the tournament three of the participants (Holloway, Cotton and Agnes Stevenson) defeated three others (Paula Wolf-Kalmar, Gülich and Pohlner) in a double-round London vs. Vienna match.

Holloway also shared 4-5th place in the inaugural Women's World Chess Championship (WWCC), held in London in 1927. She tied for 6–7th at Warsaw 1935 (5th WWCC), and 10-16th at Stockholm 1937 (6th WWCC). All of these events were won by Vera Menchik.

== Notable game ==
Edith Holloway - Peter Potemkine, Paris 1924, Owen's Defence 1.e4 b6 2.d4 Bb7 3.Bd3 f5 4.f3 fxe4 5.fxe4 g6 6.Be3 e6 7.Nf3 Nf6 8.Nbd2 Ng4 9.Qe2 Nxe3 10.Qxe3 Bg7 11.0–0 Nc6 12.c3 0–0 13.Rf2 Ne7 14.Raf1 d5 15.Ng5 Rxf2 16.Qxf2 Qd7 17.Qf7+ Kh8 18.Nxe6 Rg8 19.e5 Bc8 20.Nxg7 Rxg7 21.Qf6 Nf5 22.Nf3 Qe7 23.Re1 Kg8 24.Qc6 Be6 25.Qa8+ Qf8 26.Qxa7 g5 27.Bxf5 Bxf5 28.Qb7 Be4 29.Nd2 c5 30.Qxb6 Rf7 31.Qe6 cxd4 32.Nxe4 dxe4 33.cxd4 Qb4 34.Rf1 Qxd4+ 35.Kh1 Qd7 36.Qxf7+ 1–0
