= Edith Charlotte Price =

British chess player (1872–1956)

Edith Charlotte Price (28 April 1872 – 20 July 1956) was a British female chess master.

She enjoyed great success at the British Women's Chess Championship, winning it five times (1922, 1923, 1924, 1928, and 1948). She first played the event in 1912, finishing second and almost took the title in 1920 and 1921, when she narrowly missed out in the play-offs, having placed equal first. Her victory in 1948 at the age of 76 made her the oldest player ever to win a national championship anywhere in the world, a record which was eventually broken by Viktor Korchnoi when he won the national Swiss Chess Championship in 2009 at the age of 78.

She took sixth at London 1927 (the first Women's World Chess Championship) and took second at Folkestone 1933 (the fourth Women's World Chess Championship), both won by Vera Menchik.

From 1898 to 1945, Edith Price was the proprietress of the Gambit Chess Rooms in Budge Row, near Cannon Street in London.
