= Ingrid Larsen (chess player) =

Danish chess player (1909–1990)

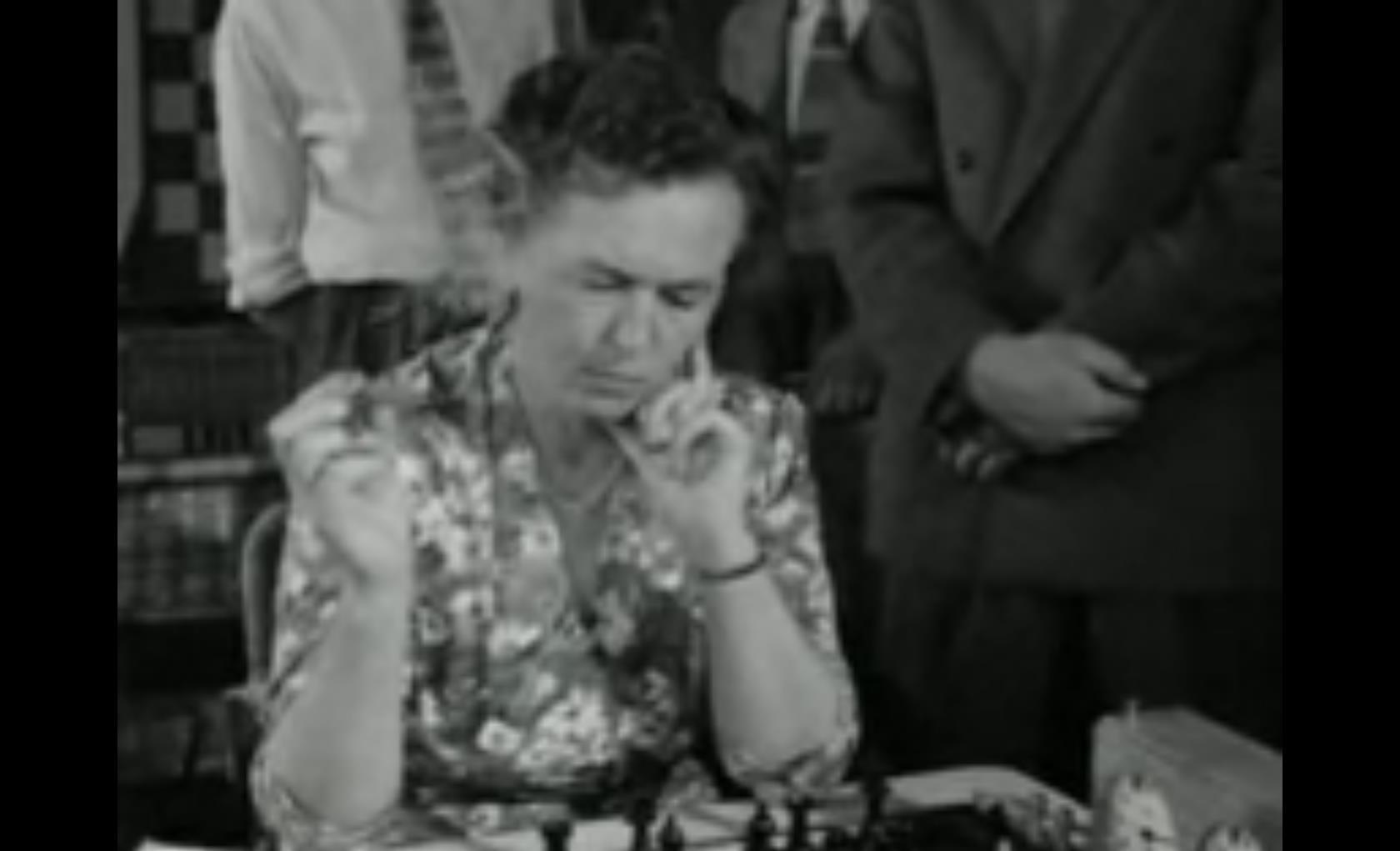
- Larsen in 1957

Personal information
- Born: 1 July 1909
- Died: 25 February 1990 (aged 80)

Chess career
- Country: Denmark
- Title: Woman International Master (1950)

Ingrid Larsen (1 July 1909 – 25 February 1990) was a Danish chess player who holds the title of Woman International Master (WIM, 1950). She was a seventeen-times winner the Danish Women's Chess Championship.

== Biography ==
From the late 1930s to the early 1980s, Ingrid Larsen was one of the leading chess players in the Denmark. Seventeen times she won the Danish Women's Chess Championships: 1936, 1937, 1938, 1939, 1943, 1944, 1945, 1946, 1948, 1949, 1953, 1956, 1957, 1960, 1965, 1969 and 1983.

Ingrid Larsen three times participated in the Women's World Chess Championship Tournaments:

- In 1937, at Women's World Chess Championship in Stockholm shared 21st-22nd place;
- In 1939, at Women's World Chess Championship in Buenos Aires has taken 11th place;
- In 1950, at Women's World Chess Championship in Moscow has taken 15th place.

Ingrid Larsen played for Denmark in the Women's Chess Olympiads:

- In 1957, at first board in the 1st Chess Olympiad (women) in Emmen (+5, =2, -4),
- In 1966, at first board in the 3rd Chess Olympiad (women) in Oberhausen (+1, =5, -7),
- In 1969, at second board in the 4th Chess Olympiad (women) in Lublin (+0, =5, -6),
- In 1976, at third board in the 7th Chess Olympiad (women) in Haifa (+4, =4, -4),
- In 1978, at third board in the 8th Chess Olympiad (women) in Buenos Aires (+6, =3, -5),
- In 1980, at first reserve board in the 9th Chess Olympiad (women) in Valletta (+1, =3, -6).

In 1950, she was awarded the FIDE Woman International Master (WIM) title.
