= Women's World Chess Championship 1927 =

The first Women's World Chess Championship took place during the 1st Chess Olympiad, held from 18 to 30 July 1927 in London. It was organized by FIDE and was played as a full round-robin tournament. Vera Menchik won the championship, conceding only half a point in her 11 games. The final results were as follows:

	Player	1	2	3	4	5	6	7	8	9	10	11	12	Points
1	Vera Menchik (URS)	-	1	1	1	½	1	1	1	1	1	1	1	10½
2	Katarina Beskow (SWE)	0	-	0	1	1	1	1	1	1	1	1	1	9
3	Paula Wolf-Kalmar (AUT)	0	1	-	1	1	1	0	½	0	1	½	1	7
4	Edith Holloway (ENG)	0	0	0	-	½	1	½	1	½	1	1	½	6
5	Edith Michell (ENG)	½	0	0	½	-	0	1	0	1	1	1	1	6
6	Edith Charlotte Price (ENG)	0	0	0	0	1	-	1	1	1	0	½	1	5½
7	Gisela Harum (AUT)	0	0	1	½	0	0	-	0	1	0	1	1	4½
8	Florence Hutchison-Stirling (SCO)	0	0	½	0	1	0	1	-	0	1	0	½	4
9	Marie Jeanne Frigard (FRA)	0	0	1	½	0	0	0	1	-	0	1	0	3½
10	Agnes Stevenson (ENG)	0	0	0	0	0	1	1	0	1	-	½	0	3½
11	Sofie Synnevåg (NOR)	0	0	½	0	0	½	0	1	0	½	-	1	3½
12	Martha Daunke (GER)	0	0	0	½	0	0	0	½	1	1	0	-	3
