= Paula Wolf-Kalmar =

Austrian chess player

- Born: 11 April 1880; Zagreb, Kingdom of Croatia-Slavonia, now (Croatia)
- Died: 29 September 1931 (aged 51); Vienna, First Republic of Austria, (now Austria)

Paula Wolf-Kalmar (11 April 1880 – 29 September 1931) was an Austrian chess master, born in Zagreb.

She took 5th at Meran 1924 (unofficial European women's championship won by Helene Cotton and Edith Holloway). After the tournament three of the participants (Holloway, Cotton and Agnes Stevenson) defeated three others (Kalmar, Gülich and Pohlner) in a double-round London vs. Vienna match.

She was thrice a Women's World Championship Challenger. She took 3rd, behind Vera Menchik and Katarina Beskow at London 1927, took 2nd at Hamburg 1930, and took 2nd at Prague 1931, both behind V. Menchik. She died in 1931 in Vienna.

In 2017, she was inducted into the World Chess Hall of Fame.
