= Sonja Graf =

German chess player (1908–1965)

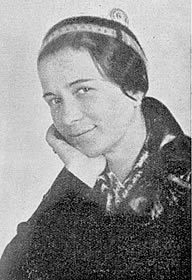
- Graf in 1934

Personal information
- Born: Susanna Graf; December 16, 1908 Munich, Kingdom of Bavaria, German Empire
- Died: March 6, 1965 (aged 56) New York City, New York, United States

Chess career
- Country: Germany; United States
- Title: Woman International Master (1950)

Susanna "Sonja" Graf (December 16, 1908 – March 6, 1965) was a German and American chess player. She was a women's world championship runner-up and a two-time U.S. women's champion. In 2016, she was inducted into the World Chess Hall of Fame.

== Early years ==
Born in Munich, Susanna Graf was the daughter of Josef Graf and Susanna Zimmermann, both Volga Germans from the Samara region, who had moved to Munich in September 1906. Her father was originally a priest in Russia, but moved to Munich to pursue life as a painter. She later wrote that despite the suffering she endured at the hands of her father, she was grateful that he taught her the game of chess when she was still a child.

Chess became her means of escape, both mentally and physically, and she began spending all her time in Munich chess cafés. Her fame as a coffeehouse player grew and she was introduced to and became the protégée of the German master, Siegbert Tarrasch. By age twenty-three, she had beaten Rudolf Spielmann twice in simultaneous competition and turned chess professional. She began traveling throughout Europe, following the chess circuit both for the experience and to distance herself from what she considered the ominous National Socialist movement based, at the time, in Munich.

During the early decades of the 20th century, female chess players were a rarity and Sonja Graf basked in the popularity and attention her sudden fame brought her as much as she exploited the freedom and independence of her new itinerant lifestyle. In 1934, she played against the era's other woman champion, Vera Menchik, in an unofficial match in Amsterdam and, subsequently, in an official 1937 world championship match in Semmering, Austria. She lost both matches (by the scores of 1–3 and 4½–11½), but was invited, along with Menchik, to participate in what would normally have been an exclusive male tournament held that year in Prague. She did not win against any of the champions, and her best result was a draw with the Estonian master Paul Keres.

== In Argentina and the United States ==
In 1939, Sonja Graf traveled to Buenos Aires, Argentina to play in the Women's World Chess Championship, held concurrently with the 8th Chess Olympiad. As a result of her outspoken defiance of Hitler's government, she was taken off the list of German participants and played under "Libre" ("free" in Spanish) flag. In September, with the tournament still in progress, Germany invaded Poland, unleashing World War II and causing unprecedented confusion within the competition. Some teams withdrew, others refused to play teams from certain countries. Both Graf and Menchik played the entire tournament. Graf won 16 games and lost 3, finishing second. In her game against Menchik, Graf lost after achieving a winning position, something she always regretted ("against Menchik, when she was world champion, I had a won game, but I found the three stupidest moves you could think of and lost."—New Yorker, September 19, 1964). Following the outbreak of the war, Sonja Graf, along with many other participants of the Olympiad, had decided to remain in the safety of Argentina. She quickly learned the local Spanish language, assimilated herself in the culture and wrote the books, Así juega una mujer (This Is How a Woman Plays), which describes her experiences as a chess player, and Yo Soy Susann (I Am Susann), recounting the physical and psychological abuse she suffered during her childhood. She also met merchant mariner Vernon Stevenson, whom she married in 1947.

The newlyweds moved to Southern California, settling in Hollywood, and Graf started playing under the name Sonja Graf-Stevenson. She retired from chess to give birth and raise her son Alexander, but subsequently returned to co-win (with Gisela Kahn Gresser) the 1957 U.S. Women's Chess Championship. She and her family moved to New York City's Greenwich Village, where she gave chess lessons at Lisa Lane's Queen's Pawn Chess Emporium. In 1964 she had her second win in the U.S. Women's Championship, but was already suffering from the liver ailment which would take her life the following year. Sonja Graf died in New York City 2 1/2 months after her 56th birthday.
