= Vera Menchik =

Czechoslovak chess player (1906–1944)

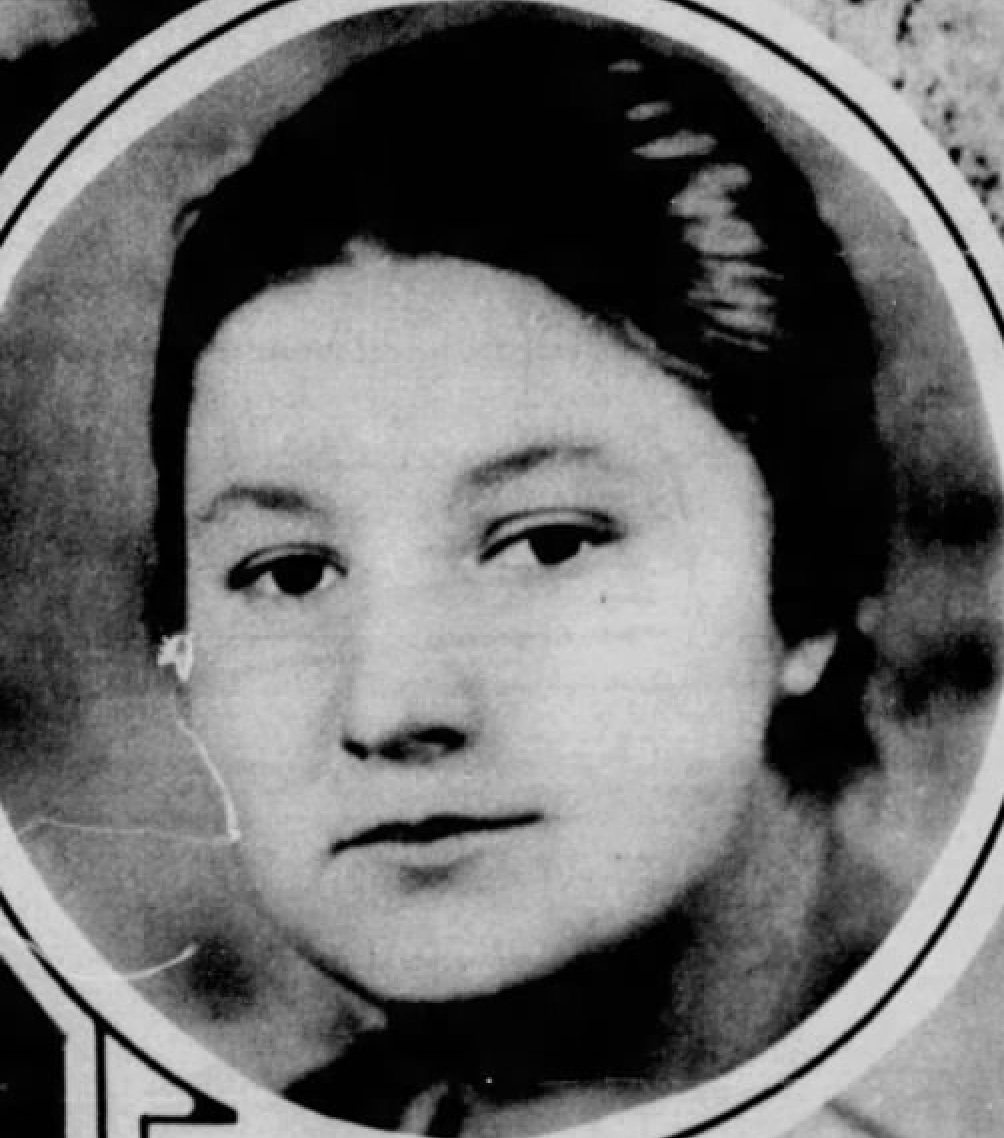
- Menchik in 1927

Personal information
- Born: Vera Francevna Mencikova; 16 February 1906 Moscow, Russia
- Died: 26 June 1944 (aged 38) Clapham, London, England

Chess career
- Country: Russia (before 1928); Czechoslovakia (1930–1937); England (1938–1944)
- Women's World Champion: 1927–1944

Vera Francevna Mencikova (Russian: Вера Францевна Менчик, Vera Frantsevna Menchik; Czech: Věra Menčíková; 16 February 1906 – 26 June 1944), was a Russian-born Czechoslovak chess player who primarily resided in England. (Note: Menchik represented Czechoslovakia at every Women's World Championship tournament except the first where she represented Russia and the last where she represented England.) She was the first and longest-reigning Women's World Chess Champion from 1927 to 1944, winning the championship a record eight times primarily in round-robin tournaments. In an era when women primarily competed against other women, Menchik was the first and only woman competing in master-level tournaments with the world's best players.

Menchik was born in Moscow to a Czech father and English mother. She began playing chess competitively in school at age 14 not long before the Russian Revolution led her family to leave Russia and move to England in 1921. She joined the Hastings Chess Club in 1923, where she began training with James Drewitt and Géza Maróczy. Menchik established herself as the best female player in the country in 1925 by defeating the British women's champion Edith Price in two matches, and then the world by winning the inaugural Women's World Chess Championship in 1927.

Menchik began competing in master-level tournaments in 1928. Following her first big success at Ramsgate in 1929 when she shared second place with Akiba Rubinstein, she was regularly invited to these elite events for the next decade, including the local Hastings Congress. Her best result in the Hastings Premier tournament was in 1931/32 when she defeated future world champion Max Euwe and Mir Sultan Khan. Late in her career, Menchik won a lone Women's World Championship match against Sonja Graf, the next-leading female player of her era. Menchik was active until her death in 1944, when she was killed in a German air raid that destroyed her home during the Second World War.

Menchik was the dominant female chess player before the war, winning at least 59 games in a row at the Women's World Championship tournaments. Highlights of her successes against male players included two victories and a positive score against Euwe and a positive score in 29 known games against George Thomas, who received the International Master (IM) title. Master-level players that Menchik defeated were said to be members of the Vera Menchik Club, which included six players who received the Grandmaster (GM) title or the honorary equivalent. The trophy for the winning team at the Women's Chess Olympiad is named the Vera Menchik Cup in her honour.

== Early life and background ==
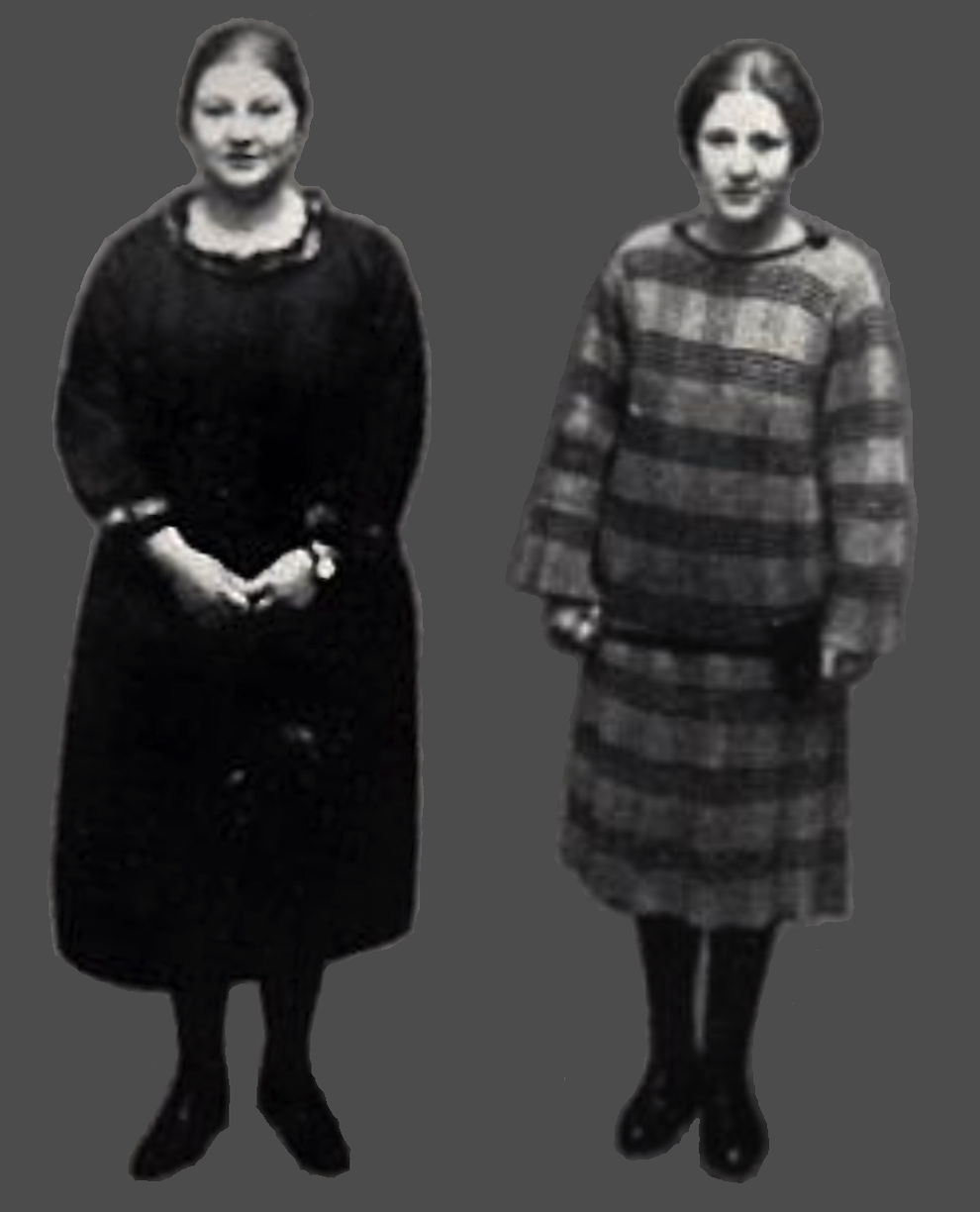
Vera Menchik (left) and her sister Olga in 1926, from British Chess Magazine

Vera Mencikova was born on 16 February 1906 in Moscow to Olga (née Illingworth) and František Menčík, who were English and Czech respectively. She had a younger sister Olga who was born a year later and also became a chess player. Her mother and father both worked for estate owners who were members of the Russian nobility. Her mother was a governess who acted as a private tutor for the owners' children while her father was the manager of their estates. Her mother's parents already lived in Russia, where her mother's father Arthur worked as a cotton manufacturer. Vera's father came to Russia in 1904 after an invite from his uncle to work as a mechanic at his textile factory. Her father later owned a mill and resumed working as a mechanic. Menchik and her family lived in a large six-room flat and had an above-average standard of living.

Menchik was taught how to play chess by her father at age nine. When she was eleven, the Russian Revolution that started in 1917 began to reshape her life. Her family was forced to share the extra space in their flat with the impoverished residents from the lower floors of their building. Menchik switched her education from a private girls' school to a Soviet public school, and her father's mill was seized. At her new school, the students started a chess club in her last year in Moscow. Menchik joined the club and played her first tournament there at age 14 with other students and teachers, none of whom were women or girls. Although the tournament was not completed, Menchik would have finished in second or third place. She stated that the tournament "gave birth to [her] sporting spirit". Not long after, Menchik left Russia in 1921 amidst her parents splitting up and their family having already been forced to move into a different home. She and her sister stayed with their mother and moved to Hastings on the southeastern coast of England to live with their maternal grandmother Marie, who had already left Moscow for Hastings because of the war. Meanwhile, her father moved back to Bohemia to live in his childhood home in Bystrá nad Jizerou.

When Menchik arrived in England, she could only speak Russian. She began to focus more on chess in part because she did not need to know English well to play. Menchik joined the Hastings Chess Club in March 1923 at age 17. The club was highly renowned, having already begun to host the Hastings International Chess Christmas Congress, an annual tournament that featured some of the best players in the world. She had considered joining the club for over a year before finally doing so. Menchik's first coach at the club was James Drewitt, the club champion that year. In the later part of the year, she began taking private lessons with Géza Maróczy, a Hungarian who later became one of the inaugural players to be awarded the Grandmaster (GM) title in 1950. This coaching made her one of the only female chess players at the time to partake in formal training. Menchik was only able to work with Maróczy until early 1924 when he left England to go to the United States. At this point, she resumed training with Drewitt. Although she only trained with Maróczy for a short time, she credited him with inspiring her to try and compete at a higher level.

== Chess career ==
=== 1923–27: Price rivalry, Women's World Champion ===
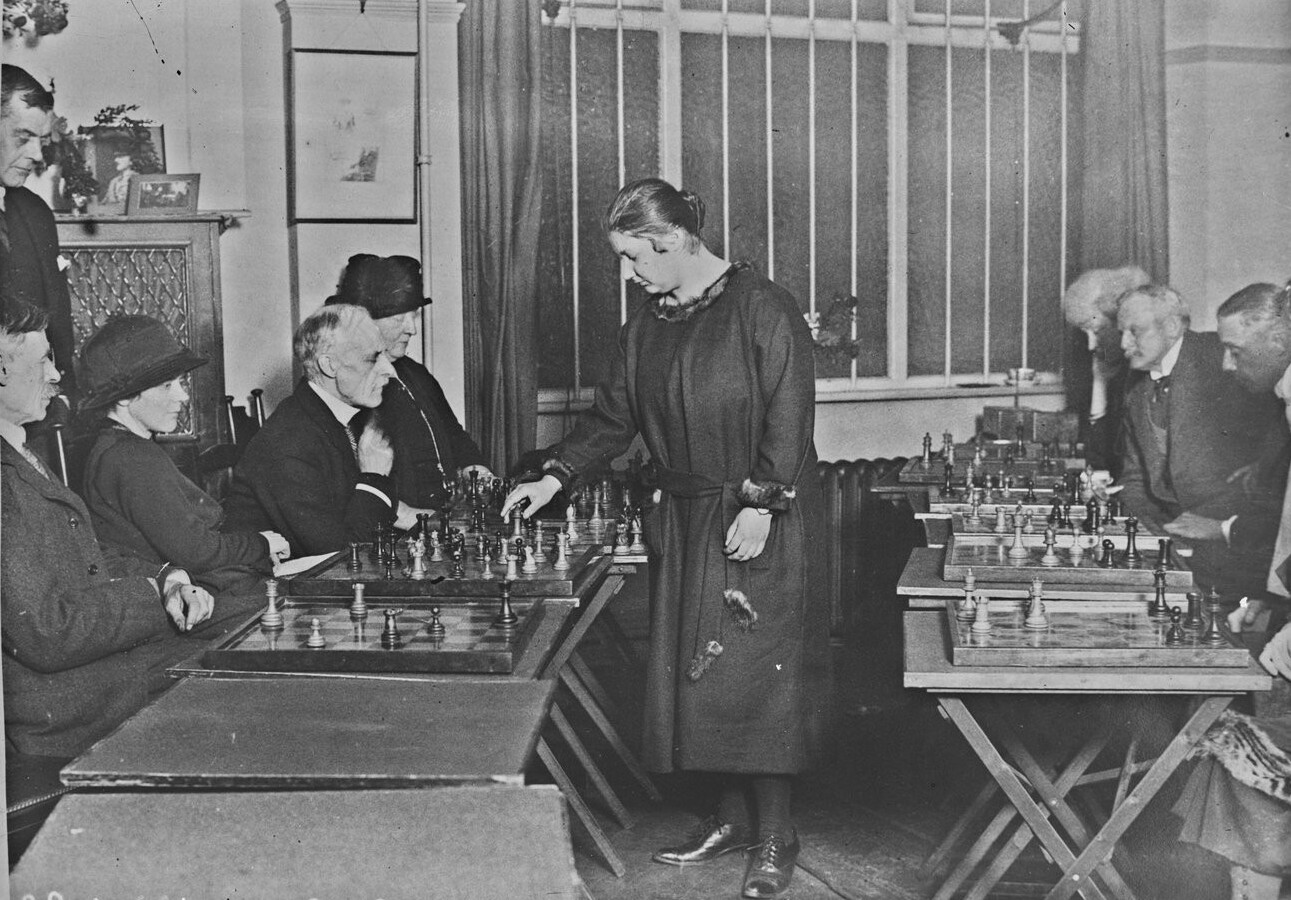
After Menchik won the 1926 London Girls' Championship, she gave a 13-board simultaneous exhibition (pictured) at the event, scoring +9–2=2.

Menchik began competing regularly in chess tournaments in her first few months at the Hastings Chess Club in 1923, starting with an intra-club match between the ladies team and a team of third class players. She first represented Hastings in the Sexton Cup inter-club competition that June, playing on the 28th and final board. A few months later in September, she began playing at the county level for East Sussex on the 39th board out of 60. The most significant tournament she entered that year was a first class section of the 1923/24 Hastings Christmas Congress, which was above the level of second class at which she had been playing in the prior months and two levels below the renowned highest international level. Although she finished in joint seventh place out of ten players with a score of 3½/9, (Note: 3½ points in 9 games. (A win is 1 point, a draw is a ½ point, and a loss is 0 points.)) she made a draw against Edith Price, the two-time reigning British women's champion.

A year later, Menchik began facing Price regularly to determine who was the better player. Both of them finished in second place in their respective sections at the first class level in the 1924/25 Hastings Christmas Congress. They played a playoff to decide the top first class woman, but the game ended in a draw. Because of this draw as well as Menchik being unable to compete in the British Women's Chess Championship because she was not a British citizen, Price challenged Menchik to a match. They ended up playing two five-game matches, one in April and one in June. Menchik won both matches 3–2 (+2–1=2 (Note: 2 wins, 1 loss, 2 draws) and +3–2=0), establishing herself as the best female player in the country. Menchik had another big success that August at the Stratford tournament, where she finished runner-up to George Thomas. She won her game against Thomas and earned a prize of £8 (equivalent to about £420 in 2022). At some point during the year, the Sussex Chess Association formally recognized Menchik as a first class player before she made it to the semifinals of the county championship. Menchik ended 1925 by playing the Major section of the Christmas Congress, the first time there was a female player in that section. She finished in joint last with three others, despite drawing against four of the five players who came in second place through joint fifth place.

Menchik began to receive media attention prior to the London Girls' Championship, where she won the first two editions with perfect scores in 1926 and 1927. There were over 30 photographers from the press present on the day of the opening ceremonies at the inaugural edition primarily to report on Menchik. She also had the opportunity to speak on BBC Radio. Her sister finished in joint second and runner-up at these two championships. In-between these tournaments, Menchik won the Major-level reserve section at the Christmas Congress, her first notable tournament victory at a high-level open tournament. The following year at the tournament at the end of 1927, she defeated Abraham Baratz, a game recognized as her first victory over an established master.

Menchik's biggest triumph in 1927 was becoming the inaugural Women's World Champion at age 21. The International Chess Federation (FIDE) hosted the first Chess Olympiad in July 1927 and decided to have a women's tournament in conjunction with the event. The event organizers wanted and were able to convince FIDE to retroactively declare the winner of the women's tournament the first FIDE Women's World Champion. The tournament was a 12-player round-robin featuring representatives of eight European countries. Menchik won the tournament with a dominant score of 10½/11, only drawing once against Edith Michell. She finished 1½ points ahead of the runner-up Katarina Beskow, and 5 points ahead of Price, who came in sixth place with an even score.

=== 1928–29: First master events, Ramsgate success ===
Menchik started playing master-level events in 1928, beginning with Scarborough in May where she was included in the Premier section after two invited American players became unavailable. She demonstrated she could compete at the Premier level, achieving an even score of 4½/9 to finish in joint seventh place out of ten. Alexander Alekhine, the World Champion at the time, commented, "She is without a doubt a phenomenon, and her victory over [Fred] Yates in the first round will be historical." Menchik also made her Premier debut in the reserve section of the Hastings Christmas Congress that year, and regularly played in the main Premier tournament thereafter until 1937.

"After 15 rounds it is certain that [Menchik] is an absolute exception in her sex. She is so highly talented for chess that with further work and experience at tournaments she will surely succeed in developing from her present stage of an average player into a high classed international champion. She indisputably has attained her three points against the strong masters, but it is little known to the public that she has also attained superior positions against Euwe, Treybal, Colle and Dr. Vidmar. She was beaten by Dr. Vidmar only after a nine hour match. It is the chess world's duty to grant her every possibility for development."

— Alexander Alekhine, the reigning World Champion, praising Menchik's performance at Carlsbad in 1929

During 1929, Menchik had the most successful open tournament of her career in the Kent Congress at Ramsgate, a Scheveningen team event between a British team and a foreign team, each with seven players. Menchik played on the foreign team, which also included former World Champion José Raúl Capablanca and her former coach Maróczy. The British team included Thomas and Yates. The foreign team won the tournament by a wide margin, and Menchik scored an unbeaten 5/7 (+3–0=4) to share second place on her team and in the tournament overall with Akiba Rubinstein, who previously had a chance to challenge for the World Championship. She was a ½ point behind Capablanca and a ½ point ahead of Maróczy. Menchik's performance drew widespread attention and resulted in her regularly receiving invitations to play international tournaments in the years to come, the first two of which were in Paris and Carlsbad in Czechoslovakia later that year. The 22-player Carlsbad event featured nearly all of the world's top players. Although Menchik did not fare well at either tournament, finishing in second-to-last and last place respectively with scores of 3/11 and 3/21, she notably won games against Edgard Colle in Paris and both Albert Becker and Friedrich Sämisch in Carlsbad. Sämisch was one of the inaugural players to receive the Grandmaster title. The victory over Becker came after he had suggested earlier in the tournament that any player Menchik defeated would be deemed a member of the "Vera Menchik Club". Despite Menchik's low score, Alekhine reaffirmed that she demonstrated talent and potential. At her next tournament in Barcelona, Menchik finished in eighth place out of fifteen participants, narrowly earning one of the prizes allocated to the top eight.

=== 1930–32: Two title defenses, two victories over Euwe ===
Menchik defended the Women's World Championship title for the first two times in 1930 and 1931 at the Olympiads in Hamburg and Prague respectively. She won both editions, each of which was played as a double round-robin featuring the same five players. She scored 6½/8 in 1930 and a perfect 8/8 in 1931. In the 1930 edition, she won by 1 point, having drawn a game against the runner-up Paula Wolf-Kalmar and lost a game to the third-place finisher Wally Henschel, her only loss at any of the Women's World Championship tournaments. The 1931 edition was the first of four consecutive world championships in which she had a perfect score, a run that spanned 45 games in total.

Menchik's best results at the Hastings Christmas Congress came in the early 1930s. At the 1930/31 edition, she defeated Max Euwe, the winner of the tournament. Euwe was already well-established as one of the best chess players in the world and ultimately became World Champion a few years later in 1935. Her victory over Euwe attracted global press coverage. Menchik next faced Euwe at the following edition and won again. She also defeated Mir Sultan Khan, who finished in fourth place, at the same tournament. Overall, Menchik scored 4/9 to earn joint fifth place out of ten at that 1931/32 tournament, the best result of her career at the Christmas Congress. Her next-best result came the following year when she finished in joint sixth place.

Most of Menchik's other biggest successes in the early 1930s also happened in England. She became the Hastings Club champion for the first and only time in 1930. The following year, she had one of the most significant tournament victories of her career, winning the Major Open section at the 1931 British Championship. The Major section was held in conjunction with the national championship, which she still could not enter because of her lack of citizenship, and was for high-level international players. Menchik won the section with an undefeated score of 9/11, one point ahead of Edward Jackson. Two of her seven wins came against Jackson and Harry Golombek.

=== 1933–37: Two matches with Graf, Maribor success ===
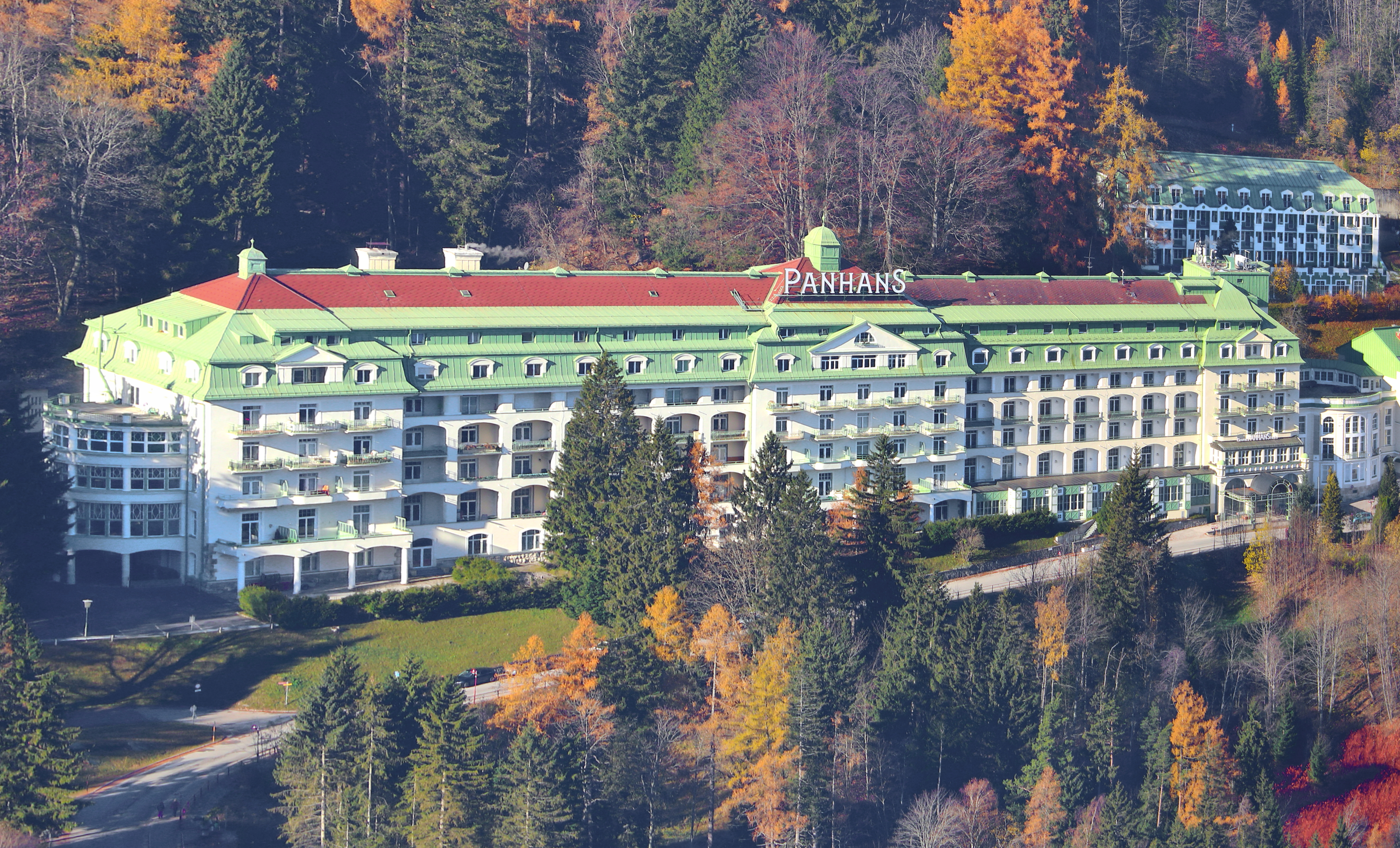
Grand Hotel Panhans, the site of the World Championship match between Menchik and Graf in 1937

The year after Menchik defended the Women's World Championship title a third time in 1933 in Folkestone, England, she was challenged to an informal four-game match by Sonja Graf, a German player she had never played against who also regularly competed in open tournaments. The match was hosted by Max Euwe in his home. Graf won the first game with the black pieces before Menchik recovered to win the last three games and the match. Graf's performance was good enough for the two to discuss the possibility of a match for the Women's World Championship in London. It never materialised, however, in part because Graf hurt her reputation by losing a match 0–6 to Paul Heuäcker, who was better regarded as a chess composer than a competitive chess player. After Menchik's fourth Women's World Championship title defence in 1935 in Warsaw, Menchik and Graf finally did play a second match a month before the next Women's World Championship tournament in 1937. Like the previous match, it was privately organized, this time with the help of William Zimdin, an Estonian luxury hotel owner who sponsored the match to be held at his Panhans Hotel in Semmering, Austria. Unlike the previous match, it was recognized by FIDE at the time as for the world championship title, albeit not for the Women's World Championship trophy. Menchik won the match convincingly by a score of 11½–4½ (+9–2=5). While Graf had an even 4/8 score with the white pieces, she lost her first seven games with the black pieces. Graf did not come close to challenging Menchik at the 1937 World Championship either, finishing in joint third place with 9/14 in her tournament debut, five points behind Menchik.

Two of the most notable open international tournaments Menchik in which participated in the 1930s were in Maribor in Yugoslavia and in Moscow. The Maribor tournament in August 1934 was one of Menchik's biggest successes in open international tournaments. Menchik finished in third place out of nine with a score of 5/8 behind only Vasja Pirc and Lajos Steiner, both of whom would be named inaugural International Masters by FIDE in 1950. The players she finished ahead of included Josef Rejfíř, Lajos Asztalos, and Milan Vidmar Jr., who all received the International Master title, and Rudolf Spielmann. On New Year's Day the next year, Menchik made a draw against Euwe at the Christmas Congress, their last encounter. The Moscow tournament in 1935 was similar to Carlsbad in 1929 in terms of the size and in that it featured many of the world's top players. It was also an opportunity for Menchik to return to her hometown. She did not fare well, scoring 1½/19 with no wins and three draws. Her best game result was a draw against Salo Flohr, who finished in joint first place with Mikhail Botvinnik. This draw was well-received by the Moscow public, in part because it helped the Soviet player Botvinnik finish in joint first instead of second to Flohr. Menchik attributed her general poor results at the tournament to spending her free time exploring the city.

Other international tournaments Menchik participated in during the mid-1930s were the Czechoslovak Championship and the international section of the British Championship. In the Czechoslovak Championship, she finished in joint last place with four others who scored 4½/11 in the 1933 tournament in Mnichovo Hradiště. Menchik's next Czechoslovak Championship was in 1936 in Poděbrady, where she finished in thirteenth place out of eighteen with a score of 7/13 and the tournament also included international players. In-between those tournaments, Menchik fared better at the 1935 Major Open at the British Championship in Yarmouth, scoring 7/11 to finish in third place behind Samuel Reshevsky and Adolf Seitz. She won her game against the tournament winner Reshevsky, who lost on time and had a perfect score in the rest of the tournament. Menchik also defeated Graf, who finished in joint seventh place with 5/11. This was the only time Menchik played Graf in an open tournament.

=== 1938–44: Competitive Women's World Championship ===
After Menchik got married in 1937, she was able to become a British citizen and represent England in competitions. She participated in a 1938 match between Britain and Holland, drawing both her games on the eighth board out of ten against Willem Mühring. Britain won the match by one point. Later that year, Menchik became the first woman to compete in the British Championship, her only appearance at the event. She scored an even 5½/11 to finish in seventh place out of twelve. She drew all of the players who placed above her except for Golombek. Menchik defended her world championship title for the last time in 1939 in Buenos Aires. The tournament was played as a 20-player round-robin. Menchik's nine-year win streak of at least 59 games at these tournaments came to an end when she was held to a draw in Round 11 by Milda Lauberte. The next round, Menchik nearly lost to Graf but was able to recover and win the game even though Graf at one point had a winning endgame. After another draw in the following round, Menchik did not lose or draw any of her remaining games and won the tournament with a score of 18/19, two points ahead of Graf. Had Graf won their game and all else was the same, they would have shared first place.

The 1939 Women's World Championship was the last time Menchik was able to leave Britain due to the Second World War, which began during the tournament. She was still able to play in some tournaments in England. She had a good result at the London Easter Congress in 1940 in which she finished in third place with a score of 6/9, behind only Golombek and Paul List, and ahead of Thomas. Two years later, Menchik played a match against Jacques Mieses, who was still an active competitor at 77 years old. Mieses had previously been one of the top ten players in the world around 1900 and later would be one of the inaugural players to receive the Grandmaster title. This match was the first between a woman and someone who had been an established top men's player. Menchik defeated Mieses in the match 6½–3½ (+4–1=5). Menchik was still competing right up to her death in 1944. Her team had qualified for the semifinals at the Southern Counties Chess Union Championship, her last tournament, but she died the day before her next game was scheduled to take place.

== Playing style ==
Menchik was a positional player. Chess author E. G. R. Cordingley described her style of play as, "Her game was characterised by solid position-play, with the definite aim of bringing about a favourable end-game and of avoiding wild complications." He compared her style of play to that of Samuel Reshevsky and Salo Flohr, but stated that she was not as accomplished as them because she lacked their imagination. Menchik's style also resembled that of her coach Géza Maróczy. Other players such as Harry Golombek and Julius du Mont likewise pointed out her lack of imagination as the reason she was not a higher-level player. On the other hand, Alekhine and Capablanca, the two World Champions who played against her the most often, did not see such a deficiency and believed she had more potential. Menchik played chess with a calm demeanor at the board. She was described as sitting "all game with her hands in front without even moving a muscle in her face." Gideon Ståhlberg, one of the inaugural grandmasters, praised her sportsmanship, saying, "Vera Menchik was relaxed in both her wins and losses. When an opponent won a good game, she was the first to congratulate him." Menchik's passive style of play was regarded as resembling her passive personality.

Menchik had a preference for playing 1.d4 (the Queen's Pawn Game) with the white pieces over other first moves. With the black pieces, she commonly defended against 1.e4 (the King's Pawn Game) with the French Defence (1.e4 e6). She regularly defended against 1.d4 with the Queen's Gambit Declined (1.d4 d5 2.c4 e6). The French Defence was the opening most associated with Menchik. She gave a lecture on this opening at the Hastings Chess Club as early as 1928. Hugh Storr-Best, a player who took lessons with Menchik, stated that the French Defence was the focus of her instruction on playing with the black pieces. Menchik credited James Drewitt with improving her understanding of closed openings, while crediting Maróczy with improving the theory aspects of her game. Golombek commented that Menchik "knew her theory very well: openings as well as endgames".

== Legacy ==
=== Achievements ===
Menchik was undoubtedly the best female chess player before the Second World War. She was the inaugural Women's World Chess Champion from 1927 until her death in 1944. Her nearly 17-year reign as Women's World Champion is the longest in chess history, ahead of the next-longest 16-year reign of Nona Gaprindashvili from 1962 to 1978 and the 13-year reign of Maia Chiburdanidze from 1978 to 1991. Emanuel Lasker, the World Chess Champion for 27 years from 1894 to 1921, was the only player with a longer reign as world champion. Alexander Alekhine was also world champion for 17 years, split between two reigns.

Menchik was the first and only woman accepted as a master in the period she was competing. The closest any other woman came to challenging Menchik while she was Women's World Champion was Sonja Graf, the only other woman primarily competing in high-level open tournaments at the time, albeit not at as high of a level as Menchik. Graf established herself as a capable competitive player in 1931 when she began working with Eduard Dyckhoff and Siegbert Tarrasch. Graf had an attacking tactical playing style completely opposite to Menchik's passive style. Menchik had a dominant record against Graf of +15–3=5. Beyond Graf, Price was the only other female player to have multiple known wins against Menchik, albeit before she became world champion. The only other women to have any recorded wins against Menchik are Wally Henschel in the Women's World Championship and Elaine Saunders.

Menchik never had a FIDE title because FIDE did not establish the Grandmaster or International Master titles until 1950 after her death and they have never awarded a title to anyone posthumously. Menchik had a record of about 25% (Note: Percent score is points divided by games as a percentage.) against GM-level players and a record of nearly 50% against IM-level players. As such, she is generally recognized as an IM-strength level player. Max Euwe was the only World Champion she won or drew a game against, although she achieved this (in 1930 and 1931) before Euwe became World Champion. The only other World Champions she faced regularly were Capablanca and Alekhine, who won all of their nine and eight games against her respectively. Nonetheless, both Capablanca and Alekhine regularly praised Menchik's ability. When asked "are there any women who played good chess" in 1932, Capablanca replied, "One. Her name is Vera Menchik... She played against me and she is very strong."

=== Vera Menchik Club ===
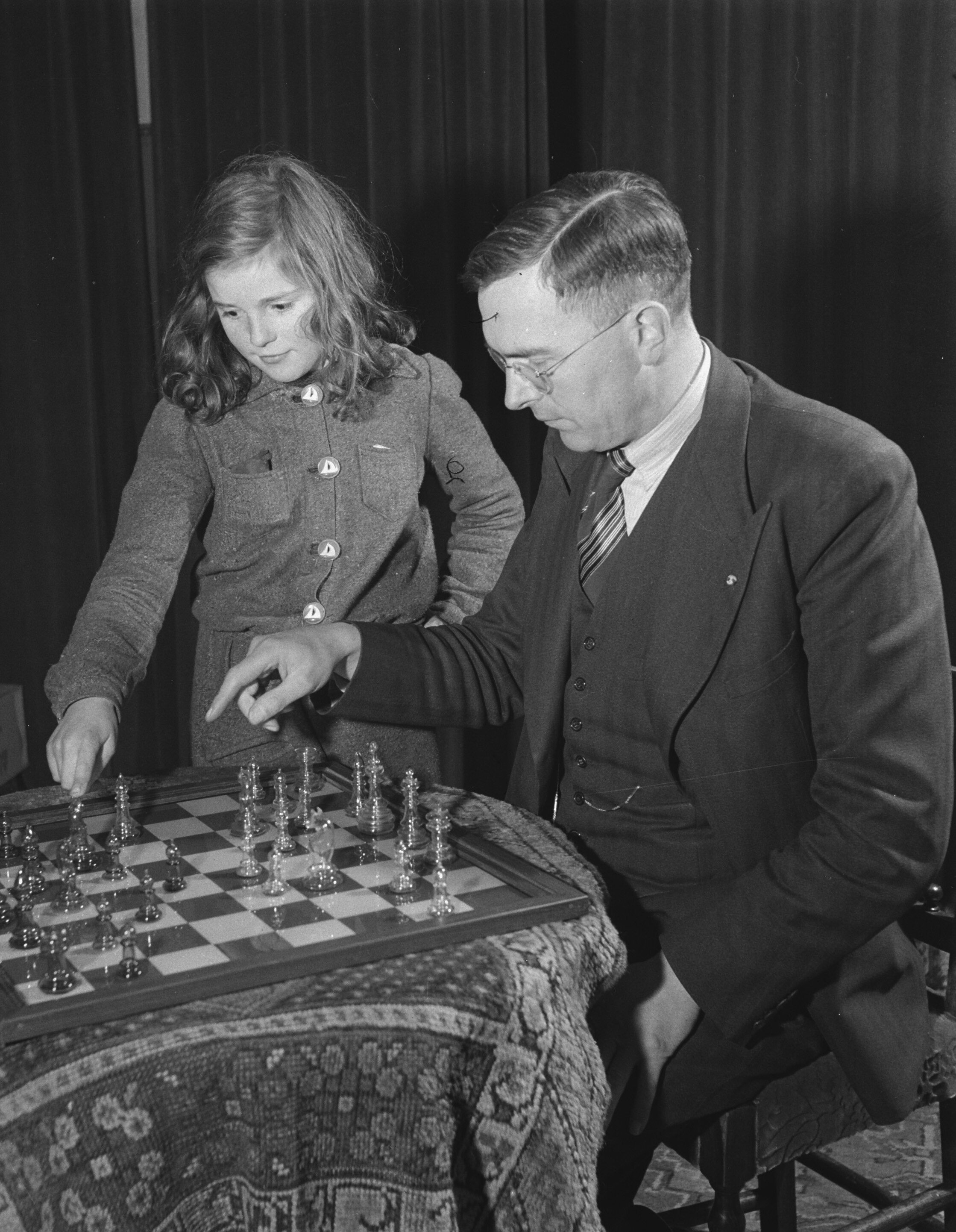
Menchik had two wins against Max Euwe (pictured in 1945 with his daughter), the World Champion from 1935 to 1937, in four tournament games. For this reason, Euwe was one of the players named "president" of the Vera Menchik Club.

Master-level players who lost to Menchik were said to be "members" of the "Vera Menchik Club", a term that was used by both these high-level players and the press. This concept originated at the Carlsbad tournament in 1929 when Albert Becker suggested the idea as a means of ridicule after Menchik lost her opening-round game. He also suggested players who drew against Menchik be deemed "candidate members". Before the same tournament, chess journalist Hans Kmoch also mocked Menchik by stating he would "go on stage as a ballerina" if Menchik scored more than three points. Becker himself became the first member of the club when he lost to Menchik in the third round. Although Menchik only scored exactly three points in Carlsbad, Kmoch expressed regret over his declaration and his behavior in light of Menchik's performance midway through the tournament. The notion of the club grew in popularity after the tournament and was routinely mentioned in the press thereafter. Max Euwe and George Thomas, both of whom had negative scores against Menchik, were each declared to be "president" of the club by the press or other master-level players on different occasions.

Out of the inaugural 27 players to be awarded the Grandmaster title by FIDE in 1950, four of them were members of the Vera Menchik Club, eight of them were candidate members, six played Menchik but never lost or drew against her in two games each on average, while the remaining nine never faced her. The inaugural GM members were: Max Euwe (+2–1=1), Jacques Mieses (+5–3=6), Samuel Reshevsky (+1–1=0), and Friedrich Sämisch (+1–0=0), where Menchik's records against each player are given in parentheses. The inaugural GM candidate members of the club were Salo Flohr (+0–7=3), Ernst Grünfeld (+0–0=2), Andor Lilienthal (+0–1=2), Géza Maróczy (+0–1=3), Miguel Najdorf (+0–0=2), Akiba Rubinstein (+0–1=1), Saviely Tartakower (+0–3=2), and Milan Vidmar (+0–1=2).

Other members of the club included two players awarded the Honorary Grandmaster title by FIDE, namely Eero Böök (+1–0=0) and Harry Golombek (+1–4=4). The players who received the International Master title in the club included Conel Hugh O'Donel Alexander, Albert Becker, Stefan Fazekas, Josef Rejfíř, Lajos Steiner, George Thomas, and William Winter, among others. Menchik also faced many master-level players who were never considered for any FIDE titles, typically because they had already died before FIDE began awarding titles. Edgard Colle and Mir Sultan Khan were members of the club who are generally recognized to be GM-strength. Reginald Michell and Fred Yates were members of the club generally recognized to be IM-strength that Menchik defeated multiple times. George Thomas was Menchik's most frequent opponent among master-level players and she had a positive score against him of +10–6=13 in their known results.

=== Women's chess ===
When Menchik first arrived in England, male chess players greatly outnumbered female chess players, particularly in competitions. Women primarily competed against other women, and it was still common for chess clubs to not allow women to join. There were some women competing at the second-class level, and the very best were competing at the first-class level. At the Hastings Christmas Congress in particular, Menchik was the first player to go past the first-class level and play in the Major section in 1925, subsequently reaching the reserves of international-level Premier section in 1928 and the main Premier section the following year.

Although Menchik had ties to England, Czechoslovakia, and Russia, she was never fully recognized as belonging to any of these countries. She could not become a British citizen until 1937. Even though she represented Czechoslovakia in her most successful years, she did not speak Czech and was rarely able to visit the country. The Moscow tournament in 1935 was the only time she was able to return to Russia after leaving. After Menchik's death, none of the countries she represented made a strong effort to sustain her legacy. The country that sought to carry on her legacy the most in the near-term was the Soviet Union. Part of the reason Menchik was invited to the Moscow tournament was the hope that her appearance in the event would help bolster Soviet women's chess. A little over two decades later, Soviet player and former Women's World Champion Elisaveta Bykova wrote the first biography about Menchik. Bykova stated that Menchik's visit to Moscow was the inspiration for her taking a serious interest in the game.

The Soviet Union was successful in becoming the leading country in women's chess after Menchik's death. They began holding women's championships in 1932 and after Menchik's appearance in Moscow in 1935, there were 5000 women competing to qualify for these championships the following year. Over a span of nearly 40 years, Soviet players won the next 15 Women's World Championships, which were reorganized primarily as matches after Lyudmila Rudenko won the vacant title in 1950. The majority of that success was by Georgian players Gaprindashvili and Chiburdanidze. Only Bykova and Olga Rubtsova, the champions from 1953 to 1962, were Russian. Rudenko was born in the Ukrainian part of the Russian Empire, but later lived in Moscow. The initial three champions were the top three finishers at the 1949/50 Women's World Championship tournament to decide Menchik's successor. Rudenko did not dominate the tournament in the way Menchik always did as her winning score of 12/15 was lower than any of Menchik's percentage scores, even though Rudenko defeated both of her closest competitors. None of these three champions were regarded as being as good as Menchik, albeit it was difficult to make a proper comparison because all three were at least age 40 when they became champion and because none of them competed against the top male players. Rudenko was the first woman to receive the International Master title in 1950. Bykova and Rubtsova also were awarded the IM title when they became the Women's World Champion. Gaprindashvili and Chiburdanidze were regarded as the next dominant women's champions after Menchik, owing to both of them holding the title for over a decade and their success in open tournaments. They were the first and second women respectively to receive the Grandmaster title.

Because Vera Menchik was the easily the best female chess player, her passive positional playing style led to the stereotype that women could not be good attacking tactical players. In modern chess, the opposite stereotype exists and it is believed that the strongest female chess players tend to have attacking styles. These more aggressive styles became associated with Gaprindashvili and later Judit Polgár, the latter of whom is widely acknowledged as the best female chess player in history. Polgár herself is also capable of a more long-term strategic style of play.

=== Honours ===
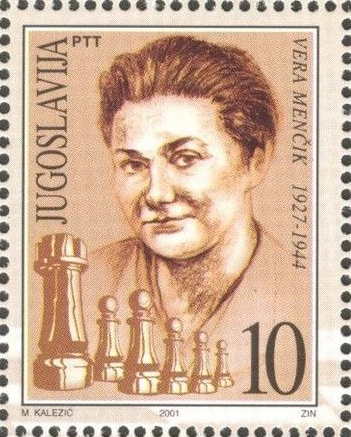
Menchik on a 2001 stamp from Yugoslavia

Menchik was inducted into the World Chess Hall of Fame in 2011. She was the 16th inductee and the first woman to be inducted. When FIDE began hosting the Women's Chess Olympiad in 1957, they named the championship trophy for the gold medal team the Vera Menchik Cup. FIDE commemorated the 50th anniversary of her death by making 1994 the "Year of Vera Menchik". Menchik has been featured on postage stamps in a few different countries, including the Czech Republic in 1996.

Various memorial tournaments have been held in Menchik's honour. In the 1960s, the Hastings Chess Club hosted a junior tournament for at least a few years for local players under age 15 at the insistence of an anonymous donor. The DPP chess club in Prague in the Czech Republic has hosted the Vera Menchik Memorial, an annual or biannual open rapid tournament that began in 2016 and has been held five times as of 2022. The English Chess Federation began hosting the Caplin Menchik Memorial in London in 2022, named for Menchik and the sponsor Caplin Systems. The inaugural edition was a ten-player women's round-robin tournament designed to give lower-titled and untitled players the opportunity to earn norms for the Woman International Master (WIM) and Woman Grandmaster (WGM) titles. It was the first memorial tournament for Menchik that England hosted since an open tournament in Maidstone in 1994 for the Year of Vera Menchik.

Because of the circumstances of Menchik's death, few of her awards have survived. The Hastings Chess Club displays Menchik's gold medal that honours her long reign as Women's World Champion. The medal had been in the possession of her sister's husband. The New York Times featured Menchik in their obituary series Overlooked in September 2022.

== Personal life ==
=== Family ===
Menchik married Rufus Henry Streatfield Stevenson in October 1937 when she was age 31 and he was age 59. She changed her name to Vera Stevenson, but still used her birth name in competitions. Stevenson had previously been married to Agnes Lawson, another high-level chess player who competed in the Women's World Championship tournaments, until her death in 1935. During Menchik's marriage, she lived with her husband in London, having already moved to the Bayswater area of the city after taking a coaching position at the Empire Social Club there in 1931. Stevenson worked as a pharmacist and was a prominent chess administrator who had some experience as a competitive chess player, having won the Kent County championship. He served as the honorary secretary of the Southern Counties Chess Association for 26 years and later became the honorary secretary of the British Chess Federation beginning in 1938. In these roles, he started county competitions, raised funds, and sought to welcome less experienced players into the game. He was also a news editor and subscriptions manager for British Chess Magazine. While her husband was an editor, Menchik influenced the magazine to include more coverage of women's chess tournaments and other topics related to women's chess. Menchik and Stevenson were married for a little over five years until his death in February 1943. By 1940, his health had already began to deteriorate. Menchik and Stevenson were believed to have had a strong marriage.

Menchik's sister Olga was also an accomplished chess player. She finished in equal first at the London Girls' Championship in 1928 the year after Vera became too old to participate, ending up as the runner-up after losing the playoff. Olga participated in the Women's World Championship competitions alongside Vera twice. Her best result was in 1935 when she finished in fourth place out of ten with a score of 5½/9, a ½ point behind the bronze medallist. She defeated the three lowest-finishers, lost to her sister, and drew against her other five opponents. Olga's only other appearance was at the next Women's World Championship in 1937 when she finished in joint 17th place out of 26 players with a score of 6½/14. She did not face Vera this time due to the Swiss format used in this edition.

=== Work ===
Menchik earned a living primarily through chess-related positions. Although she was not a full-time professional player, she supplemented the limited prize money she earned in competition by giving chess lessons, serving as a chess editor for different journals, and serving as a host at different chess clubs. She also earned money by giving simultaneous exhibitions. Menchik was an editor for the Social Chess journal with William Winter and later served as the opening columnist and games editor for Chess magazine during the Second World War. Also during the war, Menchik became the director of the British National Chess Centre in London in September 1939. She held the position for about a year until the building was destroyed by a fire when the German Luftwaffe bombed London during The Blitz early in the Second World War. After this bombing, Menchik joined the West London Chess Club. When chess lessons became less popular during the war, another way Menchik earned money was by giving lessons in the card game bridge.

=== Character ===
Menchik was generally well-liked for her personable character and her interest in other people. Her popularity was one of the reasons she regularly received invitations to tournaments. Menchik, like most other players of IM-strength, did not aim to be fully dedicated on chess compared to the majority of the world's top players and those of GM-strength. The two strongest events of Menchik's career in Carlsbad and Moscow were both located in the two other countries where she had ties. At these tournaments, Menchik took the opportunity to visit her father at the former and visited various attractions in the city at the latter, factors that may have contributed to her last-place finishes at these events. Some of Menchik's other recreational interests were seeing plays and films, playing tennis, and modelling clay.

== Death ==
Menchik was killed on 26 June 1944 when her house in Gauden Road in south London was destroyed in a direct hit by one of the earliest V-1 flying bomb attacks during the Second World War. Her sister and her mother were also killed in the attack as the entire family had sought shelter in the basement of their home. They had the option to hide in a bomb shelter in their backyard or a shelter underneath the nearby Clapham North tube station, both of which survived the attack. Nonetheless, they would not have known whether they had enough time to reach either shelter. These flying bombs were guided missiles that the German Luftwaffe launched from occupied land across the English Channel for several months from 13 June just two weeks before Menchik's death through October. They had an intermediate range of 160 miles, but were too imprecise to be aimed at a specific target. Because of that limitation, they were used with the intent of killing random civilians from afar and inciting terror amongst the general population. The Menchiks were among a little over 6000 casualties during the almost half a year of bomb attacks. As the bomb destroyed the Menchik family's home, most of the records of Vera's life were also lost in the attack, including game records, her writings, and her trophies. One of the few surviving awards was a damaged gold medal Menchik had received to honour her then twelve-year reign as world champion in 1939.

== Results ==
=== Hastings Congress ===
Menchik was an annual participant in the Hastings Christmas Congress, which comprised different-level round-robin sections, for most of her career.

Hastings tournament results
Year	Section	Players	W	L	D	Score	Place
1923/24	First class (Sec. A)	10	3	5	1	3½/9	=7th
1924/25	First class (Sec. 2)	8	4	1	2	5/7	2nd
1925/26	Major	10	1	4	4	3/9	=7th
1926/27	Major Reserve	10	5	1	3	6½/9	=1st
1927/28	Major Open A	10	3	4	2	4/9	7th
1928/29	Premier Reserve	10	3	5	1	3½/9	8th
1929/30	Premier	10	2	4	3	3½/9	9th
1930/31	Premier	10	2	5	2	3/9	8th
1931/32	Premier	10	3	4	2	4/9	=5th
1932/33	Premier	10	2	4	3	3½/9	=6th
1933/34	Premier	10	2	6	1	2½/9	8th
1934/35	Premier	10	1	4	4	3/9	8th
1936/37	Premier	10	0	4	5	2½/9	=9th

Key: Score is the number of points scored divided by the number of games, where a win (W) is 1 point, a loss (L) is 0 points, and a draw (D) is a ½ point.
Places that were shared are indicated with "=".

=== Women's World Championship tournaments ===
Menchik played seven Women's World Championship tournaments, winning all of them.

Women's World Championship tournament results
Year	Location	Players	Format	Federation	W	L	D	Score	Place
1927	London	12	Single RR	Russia	10	0	1	10½/11	1st
1930	Hamburg	5	Double RR	Czechoslovakia	6	1	1	6½/8	1st
1931	Prague	5	Double RR	Czechoslovakia	8	0	0	8/8	1st
1933	Folkestone	8	Double RR	Czechoslovakia	14	0	0	14/14	1st
1935	Warsaw	10	Single RR	Czechoslovakia	9	0	0	9/9	1st
1937	Stockholm	26	Swiss	Czechoslovakia	14	0	0	14/14	1st
1939	Buenos Aires	20	Single RR	England	17	0	2	18/19	1st

Key: Federation is the country represented by the player. Format is either round-robin (RR) or the Monrad variant of a Swiss system.
Score is the number of points scored divided by the number of games, where a win (W) is 1 point, a loss (L) is 0 points, and a draw (D) is a ½ point.

=== Matches with Graf ===
Menchik won two matches against Sonja Graf, the second of which in 1937 was a FIDE-sanctioned match for the Women's World Championship.

Informal match, Rotterdam 1934
	1	2	3	4	Points
Vera Menchik	0	1	1	1	3
Sonja Graf	1	0	0	0	1

Women's World Chess Championship match, Semmering 1937
	1	2	3	4	5	6	7	8	9	10	11	12	13	14	15	16	Points
Vera Menchik	½	1	½	1	1	1	0	1	½	1	0	1	1	1	½	½	11½
Sonja Graf	½	0	½	0	0	0	1	0	½	0	1	0	0	0	½	½	4½

== Notable games ==
=== Menchik vs. Euwe, Hastings 1931/32 ===
Menchik – Euwe, 1931/32

Position: a8 black rook, d8 black queen, h8 black rook, a7 black pawn, b7 black pawn, e7 black king, f7 black pawn, g7 black pawn, h7 black pawn, d6 black bishop, e6 black pawn, f6 black knight, b5 white bishop, c5 black pawn, e5 white knight, f5 black bishop, a4 white pawn, b4 black knight, d4 white pawn, e4 white pawn, c3 white knight, b2 white pawn, e2 white queen, f2 white pawn, g2 white pawn, h2 white pawn, a1 white rook, c1 white bishop, f1 white rook, g1 white king

Position after 10.Qe2 c5 11.Bb5+ Ke7 12.e4

Position: b7 white bishop, e7 black knight, f7 black pawn, g7 black king, b6 black bishop, e5 black pawn, f5 white pawn, g5 black pawn, b4 white pawn, d4 black pawn, a3 black pawn, d3 white knight, f3 white pawn, a2 black rook, d2 white bishop, h2 white pawn, c1 white rook, e1 white king

Position after 39... f5 40.gxf5 a4 41.Ke1 a3 42.b4

Vera Menchik – Max Euwe, 1931/32 Hastings International Christmas Congress: Round 2; Slav Defence, 1–0. Menchik defeated Euwe at the Hastings tournament for the second year in a row. Some of the annotations of the game from the August 1944 edition of Chess magazine, a few of which are attributed to chess journalist W. Ritson Morry (WRM), are included below.

1.d4 d5 2.c4 c6 ("Probably no player had more experience with the Slav than Euwe who played both sides of it in no less than 19 world championship games. Despite being played by many top players it is rare for the second player to gain an advantage with it against strong competition.") 3.Nf3 Nf6 4.Nc3 dxc4 5.a4 Bf5 6.e3 Na6 7.Bxc4 Nb4 8.0-0 e6 9.Ne5 Bd6 10.Qe2 c5 ("A rare blunder for a future world champion. He soon has to choose between submitting to a hot attack and losing a piece, and although he makes a hard fight with the two pawns he gets for it the result is inevitable. – WRM") 11.Bb5+ Ke7 12.e4 Bg6 13.Nxg6+ hxg6 14.e5 cxd4 15.Rd1 Bc7 16.exf6+ gxf6 17.g3 a6 18.Be3 Bb6 19.Bc4 Kf8 20.Ne4 Kg7 21.Rac1 Rh5 22.Bf4 e5 23.g4 Rh8 24.Bg3 Qe7 ("Black has done very well to hold the game together and White still has to solve the problem of obtaining open lines for her pieces. – WRM") 25.Nd2 Rhe8 26.Qe4 Qd7 27.Nf3 Qc6 28.Qxc6 Nxc6 29.Bd5 Rac8 30.Be4 Rc7 31.Ne1 Rec8 32.Nd3 Ne7 33.Rxc7 Rxc7 34.Kf1 Rc4 35.Bxb7 Rxa4 36.Rc1 g5 37.f3 Ra2 38.Be1 a5 39.Bd2 f5 40.gxf5 a4 41.Ke1 a3 42.b4 ("Showing the reason for not playing Bxg5 earlier. In addition to the passed pawn, White has trapped Black's rook.") 42... Kf6 43.Ba6 g4 44.Bc4 Rxd2 45.Kxd2 gxf3 46.Nc5 Kxf5 47.Bxf7 Bd8 48.Be6+ Kf6 49.Bg4 Nd5 50.Bxf3 Nxb4 51.Be4 Be7 52.Nd3 Na2 53.Rc6+ Kg5 54.Rg6+ Kh4 55.Nxe5 Nc3 56.Kd3 1–0

=== Khan vs. Menchik, Hastings 1931/32 ===
Khan – Menchik, 1931/32

Position: h1 white rook, d1 white rook, b1 white king, g2 white pawn, f2 white pawn, d2 white bishop, c2 white queen, b2 white pawn, a2 white pawn, b3 black pawn, h4 white pawn, e4 white bishop, d4 white pawn, a4 white knight, a5 black pawn, e6 black bishop, d6 black bishop, c6 black pawn, h7 black pawn, g7 black pawn, f7 black pawn, g8 black king, f8 black knight, e8 black rook, d8 black queen, a8 black rook

Position after 15.Nxe4 Nxe4 16.Bxe4 Be6 17.Kb1 b3

Position: h1 white rook, b1 white king, g2 white pawn, b2 white pawn, f3 white pawn, b3 black bishop, h4 white pawn, e4 white rook, d4 black pawn, a4 black pawn, b5 white bishop, h7 black pawn, g7 black pawn, f7 black pawn, g8 black king, d8 black rook, c8 black rook

Position after 28.Bb5 Red8 29.Re4 Nd4 30.Bxd4 cxd4

Mir Sultan Khan – Vera Menchik, 1931/32 Hastings International Christmas Congress: Round 6; Queen's Gambit Declined, 0–1. W. Ritson Morry regarded the encounter as "a masterly game" in his annotations for British Chess Magazine when it was played. Some of his annotations for the game are included below.

1.d4 Nf6 2.c4 e6 3.Nc3 d5 4.cxd5 exd5 5.Nf3 ("The omission of 5. Bg5 and the subsequent shutting in of the queen's bishop by e3 only helps Black to obtain a good position, but Sultan Khan never studied the openings very profoundly, preferring to rely on his natural gift for middle-game complications.") 5... c6 6.Qc2 Bd6 7.e3 Nbd7 8.Bd3 0-0 9.Bd2 Re8 10.h4 ("With this move White embarks upon a risky attempt to attack the Black king which is strategically completely unjustifiable.") Nf8 ("A good move making safe the kingside. White's attack will here after have little prospect of success.") 11.0-0-0 b5 12.Ng5 a5 13.e4 b4 14.Na4 dxe4 15.Nxe4 Nxe4 16.Bxe4 Be6 17.Kb1 b3 ("A shock for White. The position is laid open and the Lady Champion can obtain an advantageous ending by the ensuing series of practically forced moves.") 18.axb3 Rb8 19.Nc5 Bxc5 20.Qxc5 Bxb3 21.Rde1 Ne6 22.Qc3 Qxd4 23.Qxd4 Nxd4 24.f3 a4 25.Bf4 Rbc8 26.Bd3 Ne6 27.Be5 c5 28.Bb5 Red8 29.Re4 Nd4 30.Bxd4 ("After this the passed pawn assures an easy win, but in any case the knight is a mighty piece now that it is securely centralized. The game was in fact lost in any case.") 30... cxd4 31.Bd3 Rb8 32.Ka1 Rb4 33.Rhe1 Be6 34.Re5 a3 35.b3 Rxb3 36.Bc4 Rb2 37.Bxe6 fxe6 38.Ra5 d3 39.Rxa3 d2 40.Rd1 Rc2 0–1

=== Menchik vs. Graf, Semmering 1937 ===
Position: a8 black rook, f8 black rook, g8 black king, a7 black pawn, b7 black bishop, c7 black queen, d7 white rook, e7 black bishop, f7 black pawn, b6 black pawn, e6 black pawn, g6 black pawn, g5 white knight, h5 black pawn, c4 white pawn, g4 black knight, c3 white bishop, h3 white queen, a2 white pawn, b2 white pawn, c2 white bishop, f2 white pawn, g2 white pawn, h2 white pawn, f1 white rook, g1 white king

Final position after 20.Rad1 Ng4 21.Rd7

Vera Menchik – Sonja Graf, 1937 Women's World Championship match: Game 14; Semi-Slav Defense, 1–0. The last of Menchik's nine wins against Graf in their 1937 match, this game is noted for Menchik's final move, a brilliant tactic offering to sacrifice a rook with the threat of sacrificing the queen for a forced checkmate. Robert Tanner, the author of a biography on Menchik, provides annotations for the game, some of which are included below.

1.c4 e6 2.Nc3 d5 3.d4 Nf6 4.Nf3 Nbd7 5.e3 c6 6.Bd3 Be7 7.0-0 0-0 8.e4 dxe4 9.Nxe4 Nxe4 10.Bxe4 Nf6 11.Bc2 c5 12.dxc5 Qa5 13.Be3 Bxc5 14.Bd2 Qc7 15.Bc3 Be7 16.Qe2 b6 17.Ng5 g6 18.Qf3 Bb7 19.Qh3 h5 20.Rad1 Ng4 21.Rd7 ("The point is 21. Qxh5 fails due to 21. Qxh2+ and the material evaporates. In the game, if 21... Qxd7 22. Qxh5! with mate on h7 or h8 using the bishop or queen as necessary. If 21... Qc6 White plays 22. Rxe7 and threatens 23. Rxb7, renewing the threat. In the face of one of the pretttiest combinations ever, Black resigned.") 1–0

== Notes ==
Preceded by None (inaugural champion)	Women's World Chess Champion; 1927–1944	Succeeded by Lyudmila Rudenko (after interregnum from 1944 to 1950)
