= Women's World Chess Championship =

Women's chess competition

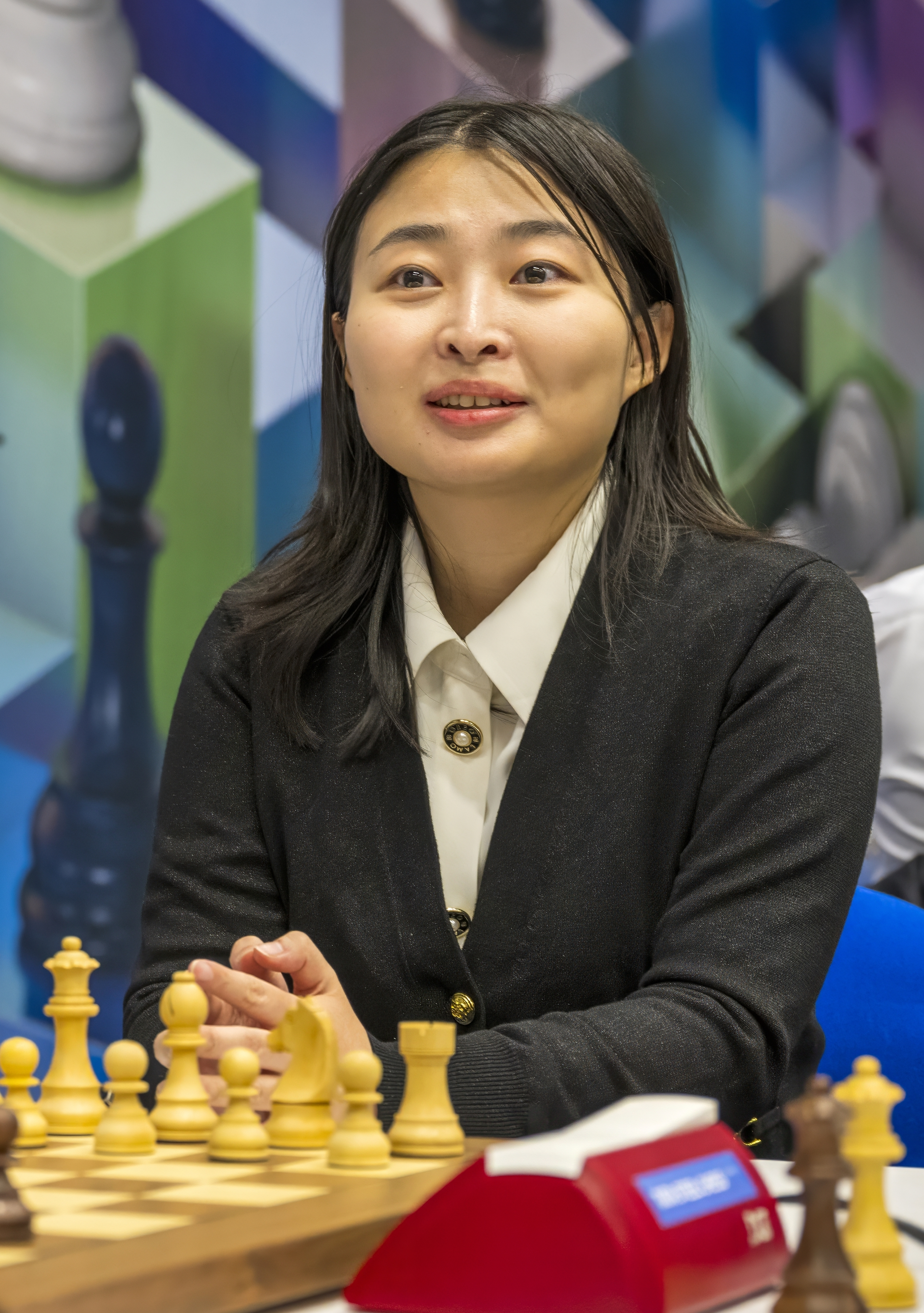
Current Women's World Chess Champion Ju Wenjun from China

The Women's World Chess Championship is a chess match played to determine the Women's World Chess Champion. It has been administered by FIDE since its inception in 1927, unlike the absolute World Chess Championship, which only came under FIDE's control in 1948.

There have been three main eras in the history of the Women's World Championship: the Menchik era (1927–1944), the Soviet-dominated era (1950–1991), and the China-dominated era (1991–present). Vera Menchik won every Women's World Championship from 1927 to 1944. The Soviet Union won every Women's World Championship from 1950 until 1991, particularly Georgian champions Nona Gaprindashvili and Maia Chiburdanidze, who combined for ten titles in a row, five each in succession. From 1991 onwards, China has 16 of the last 21 titles, spread across six different champions, including two four-time champions Xie Jun and Hou Yifan, and the reigning five-time World Champion Ju Wenjun.

The championship has not always used a match format, instead originating as a round-robin tournament. A lone championship match was played in 1937, and the championship switched to a match format as the predominant format in the 1950s. This continued until 2000, when a new knockout format was established. The match format returned in 2011 on an alternating basis with the knockout format before replacing the knockout format altogether in 2020.

== History ==
=== Era of Menchik ===
The Women's World Chess Championship was established by FIDE in 1927. FIDE wanted to gain control of the absolute World Championship and thought establishing a Women's World Championship they had already controlled would help them achieve that. They hosted a women's round-robin tournament as a side event at the Chess Olympiad and weeks after the tournament ended, decided to retroactively declare the winner of the tournament, Vera Menchik, to be the inaugural Women's World Chess Champion.

Menchik remained champion until her death, defending the title seven additional times. Throughout Menchik's reign, the world championship was primarily contested in tournaments, in contrast to the absolute World Chess Championship that used a match format and a challenge system. The lone exception was a privately organized 1937 match between Menchik and Sonja Graf, which was formally recognized by FIDE. The Women's World Championship continued to be held in conjunction with the Chess Olympiad. As a result, it was held on a more regular basis than the absolute World Championship that was only held sporadically whenever there was a challenger.

=== Dominance of the Soviet Union players (1950–1991) ===
1981 Women's World Championship, Maia Chiburdanidze vs. Nana Alexandria

Menchik died, still champion, in 1944 when her house in Clapham was bombed by a V-1 flying bomb. The next championship was another round-robin tournament in 1949–50 and was won by Lyudmila Rudenko. Thereafter a system similar to that of the overall championship was established, with a cycle of Candidates events (and later Interzonals) to pick a challenger to face the reigning champion.

The first such Candidates tournament was held in Moscow, 1952. Elisaveta Bykova won and proceeded to defeat Rudenko with seven wins, five losses, and two draws to become the third champion. The next Candidates tournament was won by Olga Rubtsova. Instead of directly playing Bykova, however, FIDE decided that the championship should be held between the three top players in the world. Rubtsova won at Moscow in 1956, one-half point ahead of Bykova, who finished five points ahead of Rudenko. Bykova regained the title in 1958 and defended it against Kira Zvorykina, winner of a Candidates tournament, in 1959.

The fourth Candidates tournament was held in 1961 in Vrnjacka Banja, and was utterly dominated by Nona Gaprindashvili of Georgia, who won with ten wins, zero losses, and six draws. She then decisively defeated Bykova with seven wins, no losses, and four draws in Moscow, 1962 to become champion. Gaprindashvili defended her title against Alla Kushnir of Russia at Riga 1965 and Tbilisi/Moscow 1969. In 1972, FIDE introduced the same system for the women's championship as with the overall championship: a series of Interzonal tournaments, followed by the Candidates matches. Kushnir won again, only to be defeated by Gaprindashvili at Riga 1972. Gaprindashvili defended the title one last time against Nana Alexandria of Georgia at Pitsunda/Tbilisi 1975.

In 1976–1978 Candidates cycle, 17-year-old Maya Chiburdanidze of Georgia ended up the surprise star, defeating Nana Alexandria, Elena Akhmilovskaya, and Alla Kushnir to face Gaprindashvili in the 1978 finals at Tbilisi. Chiburdanidze soundly defeated Gaprindashvili, marking the end of one Georgian's domination and the beginning of another's. Chiburdanidze defended her title against Alexandria at Borjomi/Tbilisi 1981 and Irina Levitina at Volgograd 1984. Following this, FIDE reintroduced the Candidates tournament system. Akhmilovskaya, who had earlier lost to Chiburdanidze in the Candidates matches, won the tournament but was still defeated by Chiburdanidze at Sofia 1986. Chiburdanidze's final title defense came against Nana Ioseliani at Telavi 1988.

=== Post-Soviet era (1991–2010) ===
Chiburdanidze's domination ended in Manila 1991, where the young Chinese star Xie Jun defeated her, after finishing second to the still-active Gaprindashvili in an Interzonal, tying with Alisa Marić in the Candidates tournament, and then beating Marić in a tie-breaker match. Thus, Soviet domination in the women's section ended after 41 years.

It was during this time that the three Polgar sisters Susan (also known as Zsuzsa), Sofia (Zsófia), and Judit emerged as dominant players. However they tended to compete in open tournaments, avoiding the women's championship.

Susan Polgar eventually changed her policy. She won the 1992 Candidates tournament in Shanghai. The Candidates final—an eight-game match between the top two finishers in the tournament—was a drawn match between Polgar and Ioseliani, even after two tiebreaks. The match was decided by a lottery, which Ioseliani won. Ioseliani went on to be crushed by Xie Jun (8½–2½) in the championship at Monaco 1993.

The next cycle was dominated by Polgar. She tied with Chiburdanidze in the Candidates tournament, defeated her easily in the match (5½–1½), and then decisively defeated Xie Jun (8½–4½) in Jaén 1996 for the championship.

In 1997, Russian Alisa Galliamova and Chinese Xie Jun finished first and second, but Galliamova refused to play the final match entirely in China. FIDE eventually awarded the match to Xie Jun by default.

However, by the time all these delays were sorted out, Polgar had given birth to her first child. She requested that the match be postponed. FIDE refused, and eventually set up the championship to be between Galliamova and Xie Jun. The championship was held in Kazan, Tatarstan and Shenyang, China, and Xie Jun won with five wins, three losses, and seven draws.

In 2000 a knock-out event, similar to the FIDE overall title and held alongside it, was the new format of the women's world championship. It was won by Xie Jun. In 2001 a similar event determined the champion, Zhu Chen. Another knock-out, this one held separately from the overall championship, in Elista, the capital of the Russian republic of Kalmykia (of which FIDE President Kirsan Ilyumzhinov is president), from May 21 to June 8, 2004, produced Bulgarian Antoaneta Stefanova as champion. As with Polgar five years prior, Zhu Chen did not participate due to pregnancy.

In 2006 the title returned to China. The new champion Xu Yuhua was pregnant during the championship.

In 2008, the title went to Russian grandmaster Alexandra Kosteniuk, who, in the final, beat Chinese prodigy Hou Yifan 2½–1½, then aged 14 (see Women's World Chess Championship 2008).

In 2010 the title returned to China once again. Hou Yifan, the runner-up in the previous championship, became the youngest ever women's world champion at the age of 16. She beat her compatriot WGM Ruan Lufei 2–2 (classic) 3–1 (rapid playoffs).

=== Yearly tournaments (2010–2018) ===
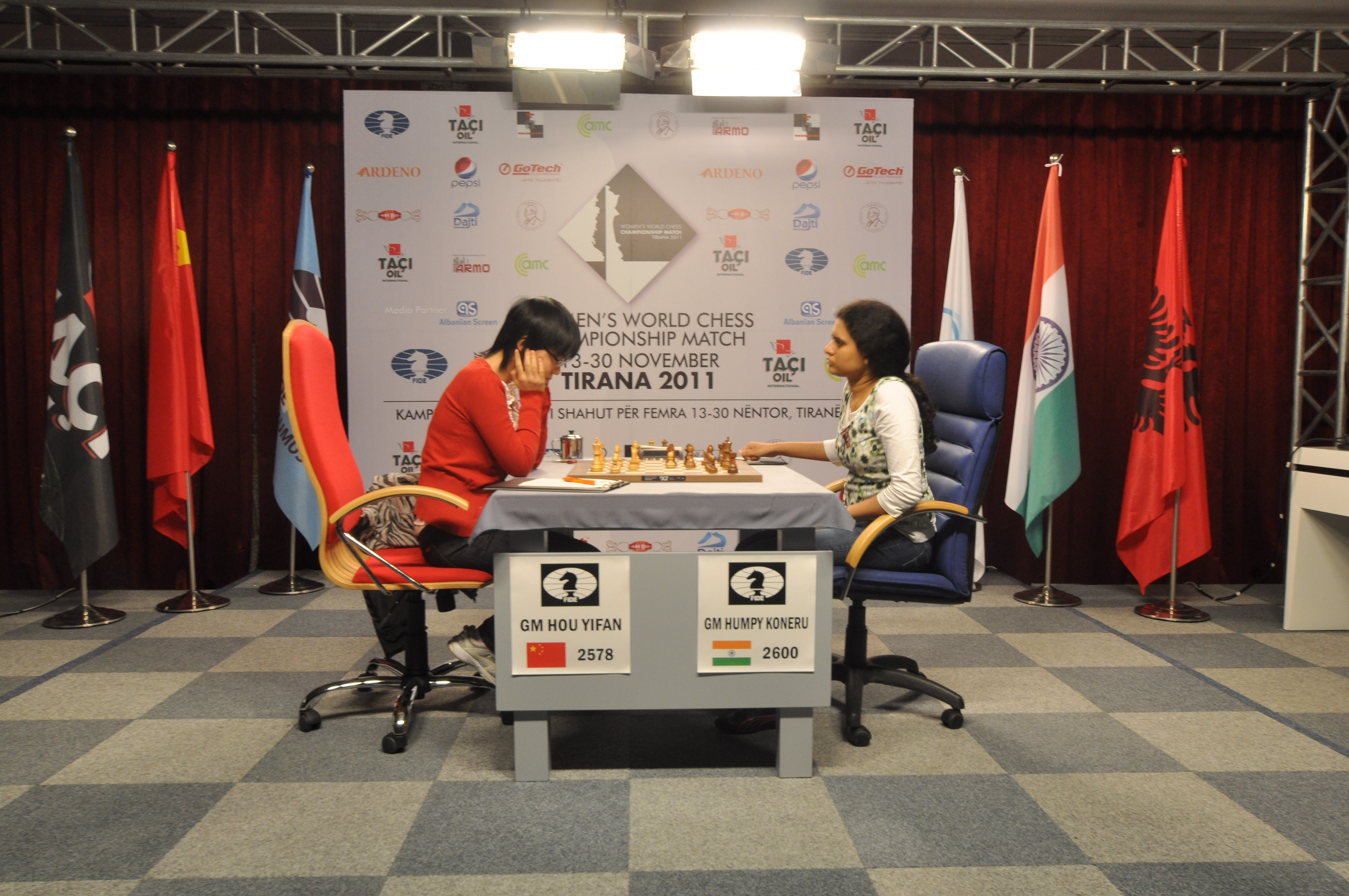
Women's World Chess Championship, Tirana 2011

Beginning from 2010, the Women's World Chess Championship would be held annually in alternating formats. In even years a 64-player knockout system would be used, in the odd years a classical match featuring only two players would be held. The 2011 edition was between the 2010 champion Hou Yifan and the winner of the FIDE Women's Grand Prix 2009–2011. Since Hou Yifan won the Grand Prix, her challenger was the runner-up, Koneru Humpy.

In 2011 Hou Yifan successfully defended her women's world champion title in the Women's World Chess Championship 2011 in Tirana, Albania against Koneru Humpy. Hou won three games and drew five in the ten-game match, winning the title with two games to spare.

Hou Yifan was knocked-out in the second round in Women's World Chess Championship 2012, which was played in Khanty Mansiysk. Anna Ushenina, seeded 30th in the tournament, won the final against Antoaneta Stefanova 3½–2½.

The Women's World Chess Championship 2013 was a match over 10 games between defending champion Anna Ushenina and Hou Yifan who had won the FIDE Women's Grand Prix 2011–2012. After seven of ten games Hou Yifan won the match 5.5 to 1.5 to retake the title.

After Hou declined to defend her title at the Women's World Chess Championship 2015, the title was won by Mariya Muzychuk, who defeated Natalia Pogonina in the final.

Hou defeated Muzychuk 6–3 to reclaim the Women's World Chess Championship 2016 title for her 4th championship in March 2016.

The following year Tan Zhongyi defeated Anna Muzychuk for the title at the Women's World Chess Championship 2017.

Tan lost the title defending it against Ju Wenjun (with Hou not participating at this event) at the Women's World Chess Championship Match 2018.

=== Return to match-only format ===
Due to various hosting and timing issues, the championships had varied from their intended annual calendar in recent years. FIDE held a second world championship in 2018 in order to get back on schedule.

After the 2018 championship tournament the new FIDE president Arkady Dvorkovich announced the format would be changed back to matches only. He said the many different champions the yearly system created discredited the championship title as a whole. Aleksandra Goryachkina won the Candidates tournament, held in June 2019, to challenge for the World Championship. Ju Wenjun retained her title in the 2020 Championship.

Ju retained her title in the 2023 championship against Lei Tingjie and in the 2025 championship against Tan Zhongyi.

== List of Women's World Chess Champions ==
#	Name	Country	Years
1	Vera Menchik	Russia; Czechoslovakia; United Kingdom	1927–1944
2	Lyudmila Rudenko	Soviet Union	1950–1953
3	Elisaveta Bykova	Soviet Union	1953–1956
4	Olga Rubtsova	Soviet Union	1956–1958
(3)	Elisaveta Bykova	Soviet Union	1958–1962
5	Nona Gaprindashvili	Soviet Union	1962–1978
6	Maia Chiburdanidze	Soviet Union	1978–1991
7	Xie Jun	China	1991–1996
8	Susan Polgar	Hungary	1996–1999
(7)	Xie Jun	China	1999–2001
9	Zhu Chen	China	2001–2004
10	Antoaneta Stefanova	Bulgaria	2004–2006
11	Xu Yuhua	China	2006–2008
12	Alexandra Kosteniuk	Russia	2008–2010
13	Hou Yifan	China	2010–2012
14	Anna Ushenina	Ukraine	2012–2013
(13)	Hou Yifan	China	2013–2015
15	Mariya Muzychuk	Ukraine	2015–2016
(13)	Hou Yifan	China	2016–2017
16	Tan Zhongyi	China	2017–2018
17	Ju Wenjun	China	2018–present

== Editions and winners ==
Year	Host country	Host city	World champion	Runner-up	W	L	D	Format
Tournament formats (1927–1956)
1927	United Kingdom	London	Vera Menchik	Katarina Beskow	10	0	1	RR (12 players)
1930	Germany	Hamburg	Vera Menchik	Paula Wolf-Kalmar	6	1	1	Double RR (5 players)
1931	Czechoslovakia	Prague	Vera Menchik	Paula Wolf-Kalmar	8	0	0	Double RR (5 players)
1933	United Kingdom	Folkestone	Vera Menchik	Edith Charlotte Price	14	0	0	Double RR (8 players)
1935	Poland	Warsaw	Vera Menchik	Regina Gerlecka	9	0	0	RR (10 players)
1937 Jul	Austria	Semmering	Vera Menchik	Sonja Graf	9	2	5	16-game match
1937 Aug	Sweden	Stockholm	Vera Menchik	Clarice Benini	14	0	0	Swiss (26 players)
1939	Argentina	Buenos Aires	Vera Menchik	Sonja Graf	17	0	2	RR (20 players)
Menchik died in 1944 as reigning world champion.
Interregnum (1944–1950)
1950	Soviet Union	Moscow	Lyudmila Rudenko	Olga Rubtsova	9	5	1	RR (16 players)
1953	Soviet Union	Moscow	Elisaveta Bykova	Lyudmila Rudenko	7	5	2	14-game match
1956	Soviet Union	Moscow	Olga Rubtsova	Elisaveta Bykova	7	6	3	Octuple RR (3 players)
Match format (1958–1999)
1958	Soviet Union	Moscow	Elisaveta Bykova	Olga Rubtsova	7	4	3	16-game match
1959	Soviet Union	Moscow	Elisaveta Bykova	Kira Zvorykina	6	2	5	16-game match
1962	Soviet Union	Moscow	Nona Gaprindashvili	Elisaveta Bykova	7	0	4	16-game match
1965	Soviet Union	Riga	Nona Gaprindashvili	Alla Kushnir	7	3	3	16-game match
1969	Soviet Union	Tbilisi; Moscow	Nona Gaprindashvili	Alla Kushnir	6	2	5	16-game match
1972	Soviet Union	Riga	Nona Gaprindashvili	Alla Kushnir	5	4	7	16-game match
1975	Soviet Union	Pitsunda; Tbilisi	Nona Gaprindashvili	Nana Alexandria	8	3	1	16-game match
1978	Soviet Union	Tbilisi	Maia Chiburdanidze	Nona Gaprindashvili	4	2	9	16-game match
1981	Soviet Union	Borjomi; Tbilisi	Maia Chiburdanidze	Nana Alexandria	4	4	8	16-game match
1984	Soviet Union	Volgograd	Maia Chiburdanidze	Irina Levitina	5	2	7	16-game match
1986	Bulgaria	Sofia	Maia Chiburdanidze	Elena Akhmilovskaya	4	1	9	16-game match
1988	Soviet Union	Telavi	Maia Chiburdanidze	Nana Ioseliani	3	2	11	16-game match
1991	Philippines	Manila	Xie Jun	Maia Chiburdanidze	4	2	9	16-game match
1993	Monaco	Monaco	Xie Jun	Nana Ioseliani	7	1	3	16-game match
1996	Spain	Jaén	Susan Polgar	Xie Jun	6	2	5	16-game match
FIDE declared Polgar's title to be forfeited in 1999.								16-game match
1999	Russia; China	Kazan; Shenyang	Xie Jun	Alisa Galliamova	5	3	7	16-game match
Knockout format (2000–2010)
2000	India	New Delhi	Xie Jun	Qin Kanying	1	0	3	KO (64 players)
2001	Russia	Moscow	Zhu Chen	Alexandra Kosteniuk	2+3	2+1	0	KO (64 players)
2004	Russia	Elista	Antoaneta Stefanova	Ekaterina Kovalevskaya	2	0	1	KO (64 players)
2006	Russia	Yekaterinburg	Xu Yuhua	Alisa Galliamova	2	0	1	KO (64 players)
2008	Russia	Nalchik	Alexandra Kosteniuk	Hou Yifan	1	0	3	KO (64 players)
2010	Turkey	Hatay	Hou Yifan	Ruan Lufei	1+2	1	2+2	KO (64 players)
Alternating formats (2011–2018)
2011	Albania	Tirana	Hou Yifan	Koneru Humpy	3	0	5	10-game match
2012	Russia	Khanty-Mansiysk	Anna Ushenina	Antoaneta Stefanova	1+1	1	2+1	KO (64 players)
2013	China	Taizhou	Hou Yifan	Anna Ushenina	4	0	3	10-game match
2015	Russia	Sochi	Mariya Muzychuk	Natalia Pogonina	1	0	3	KO (64 players)
2016	Ukraine	Lviv	Hou Yifan	Mariya Muzychuk	3	0	6	10-game match
2017	Iran	Tehran	Tan Zhongyi	Anna Muzychuk	1+1	1	2+1	KO (64 players)
2018 May	China	Shanghai; Chongqing	Ju Wenjun	Tan Zhongyi	3	2	5	10-game match
2018 Nov	Russia	Khanty-Mansiysk	Ju Wenjun	Kateryna Lagno	1+2	1	2+2	KO (64 players)
Match format (2019–present)
2020	China; Russia	Shanghai; Vladivostok	Ju Wenjun	Aleksandra Goryachkina	3+1	3	6+3	12-game match
2023	China	Shanghai; Chongqing	Ju Wenjun	Lei Tingjie	2	1	9	12-game match
2025	China	Shanghai; Chongqing	Ju Wenjun	Tan Zhongyi	5	1	3	12-game match
2027	TBA	TBA	Ju Wenjun vs. Vaishali Rameshbabu					12-game match

Key: RR = round-robin tournament, KO = knockout tournament

=== Number of titles ===
Champion	Titles	Years
(Russia) (Czechoslovakia) (United Kingdom) Vera Menchik	8	17
(Soviet Union) Nona Gaprindashvili	5	16
(Soviet Union) Maia Chiburdanidze	5	13
(China) Ju Wenjun	5	8
(China) Xie Jun	4	7
(China) Hou Yifan	4	5
(Soviet Union) Elisaveta Bykova	3	7
(Soviet Union) Lyudmila Rudenko	1	3
(Hungary) Susan Polgar	1	3
(China) Zhu Chen	1	3
(Soviet Union) Olga Rubtsova	1	2
(Bulgaria) Antoaneta Stefanova	1	2
(China) Xu Yuhua	1	2
(Russia) Alexandra Kosteniuk	1	2
(Ukraine) Anna Ushenina	1	1
(Ukraine) Mariya Muzychuk	1	1
(China) Tan Zhongyi	1	1

== See also ==
- Development of the Women's World Chess Championship
- World Chess Championship
- Women's World Team Chess Championship 2009
- List of female chess players
