= 1942 in chess =

The below is a list of events in chess in the year 1942.

== Chess events in brief ==
- 9–18 June 1942 – Salzburg 1942 chess tournament, Six Grandmasters' Tournament in the rooms of Mirabell Palace, organised by Ehrhardt Post, the Chief Executive of Nazi Grossdeutscher Schachbund, was won by Alexander Alekhine, followed by Paul Keres, Paul Felix Schmidt, Klaus Junge, Efim Bogoljubow, and Gösta Stoltz.
- 31 August 1942 – Vladimirs Petrovs was arrested under the infamous Article 58, for criticising decreased living standards in Latvia since the Soviet annexation of 1940. Petrovs was sentenced to ten years in a corrective labor camp (Gulag). Finally, he had died at Kotlas on August 26, 1943, from an inflammation of the lungs.
- 14–26 September 1942 – a tournament purporting to be the first European Individual Chess Championship (Europameisterschaft), organised by Post, was held in Munich. The main event was won by Alexander Alekhine, followed by Paul Keres, Jan Foltys, Efim Bogoljubow, Kurt Richter, Gedeon Barcza, Klaus Junge, etc. The Qualification Tournament (Wertungsturnier) won Gösta Danielsson ahead of József Szily.
- 28 September 1942 – Salo Landau tried to escape the Nazis by fleeing to Switzerland with his family, but they were caught in Breda, near the border with Belgium. He was sent to a concentration camp in Gräditz, Silesia, where he died sometime between October 1943 and March 1944, probably 15 November 1943. His wife and young daughter, whose hiding place was betrayed, were sent to Auschwitz, where they were gassed on October 12, 1944.

== Tournaments ==
- Moscow (the Moscow City Chess Championship), won by Isaak Mazel ahead of Vladimirs Petrovs, 1941/42.
- Dresden won by Klaus Junge ahead of Rudolf Keller, 3–8 January 1942.
- Beverwijk (the 5th Hoogovens), won by Max Euwe ahead of Nicolaas Cortlever, January 1942.
- Leeuwarden (the Dutch Chess Championship, Qualification), won jointly by Arnold van den Hoek, Cortlever and Adriaan de Groot.
- Moscow won by Igor Bondarevsky ahead of Petrovs, February 17 – March 12, 1942.
- Warsaw (Ghetto) won by Henryk Pogorieły ahead of Abram Szpiro, February – April 1942.
- Mar del Plata won by Miguel Najdorf ahead of Hermann Pilnik and Gideon Ståhlberg.
- Buenos Aires (Club Argentino de Ajedrez), won by Stahlberg ahead of Pilnik.
- Buenos Aires (the Argentine Chess Championship), won by Pilnik ahead of Jacobo Bolbochán.
- Rio de Janeiro (the Brazilian Chess Championship, Qualification), won by Duarte ahead of João de Souza Mendes.
- Lima (the Peruvian Chess Championship), won by José Andrés Pérez.
- Montevideo (the Uruguayan Chess Championship), won by Arturo Liebstein.
- Rostock won by Carl Carls ahead of Junge, start 29 March 1942.
- Regensburg won by Friedrich Nürnberg ahead of Georg Klaus, March 29 – April 5, 1942.
- Sverdlovsk won by Viacheslav Ragozin ahead of Petrovs, March 22 – April 11, 1942.
- New York City (the 4th U.S. Chess Championship) won by Isaac Kashdan and Samuel Reshevsky, 10–30 April 1942.
- Cottbus won by Efim Bogoljubow and Milan Vidmar Jr., start 19 April 1942.
- Bad Elster won by Walter Niephaus ahead of Friedrich Sämisch, start 10 May 1942.
- Salzburg won by Alexander Alekhine ahead of Paul Keres, 9–18 June 1942.
- Bad Oeynhausen (the 9th German Chess Championship), won by Ludwig Rellstab ahead of Hans Müller and Klaus, 22 June – July 4, 1942.
- Leipzig won by Niephaus ahead of Junge.
- Brussels (the Belgian Chess Championship), won by Albéric O'Kelly de Galway.
- Sofia (the Bulgarian Chess Championship), won by Yury Toshev, July 19 – August 2, 1942.
- Budapest (the Hungarian Chess Championship), won by Gedeon Barcza ahead of Géza Füster.
- Nørresundby (the Danish Chess Championship), won by Bjørn Nielsen ahead of Jens Enevoldsen.
- Östersund (the Swedish Chess Championship) won by Erik Lundin.
- Stockholm won by Folke Ekström and Stig Lundholm.
- Kuibyshev won by Isaac Boleslavsky ahead of Vasily Smyslov, July 27 – August 19, 1942.
- Washington, D.C. (Washington Chess Divan Championship), won by Reuben Fine.
- Ventnor City won by Daniel Yanofsky ahead of Jacob Levin.
- Dallas (the 43rd U.S. Open), won by Herman Steiner and Yanofsky, 22–30 August 1942.
- Munich (Europameisterschaft), won by Alekhine ahead of Keres, 14–26 September 1942.
- Munich (Wertungsturnier), won by Gösta Danielsson ahead of József Szily, 14–26 September 1942.
- Warsaw/Lublin/Kraków (the 3rd GG-ch), won by Alekhine followed by Junge, Bogoljubow, Friedrich Sämisch, Rudolf Keller, Georg Kieninger, etc., 11–24 October 1942.
- Moscow (Championship of the City), won by Smyslov ahead of Boleslavsky, November 1942.
- Berlin won by Carl Ahues ahead of Rellstab, start 5 December 1942.
- Prague (Duras 60-jährigen Jubiläum), won by Alekhine and Junge, December 1942.

== Matches ==
- Héctor Rossetto defeated Carlos Guimard (8 : 5) in Buenos Aires, Argentina (the 20th ARG-ch).
- Walter Cruz drew with Paulo Duarte (5 : 5) in São Paulo, Brazil (the 12th BRA-ch).
- Vladimir Makogonov beat Salo Flohr (7.5 : 4.5) in Baku, Azerbaijan.
- Rudolf Teschner won against Friedrich Sämisch (5 : 3) in Berlin, Germany.
- Samuel Reshevsky beat Isaac Kashdan (7.5 : 3.5) in New York (play-off match for the U.S. Champion title).

== Team matches ==
- 8–9 August, Sofia: Bulgaria vs. Croatia 5–11 (2–6, 3–5)

(Toshev 01 Rabar; Tsvetkov 01 Tekavčić; Neikirch 10 Šubarić; Bidev 10 Petek; Kantardzhiev 00 Jerman; Dimitrov 00 Dumić; unknown 00 Horvath; Popov 01 Licul)

- 23–24 August, Trenčianske Teplice: Slovakia vs. Croatia 8-8 (2½-5½, 5½-2½)

(Rohaček ½½ Rabar; Potuček 00 Tekavčić; Ramharter ½1 Šubarić; Ujtelky 0½ Petek; Milan 0½ Jerman; Dienes 11 Horvath; Miština ½1 Dumić; Lauda 01 Licul)

== Births ==
- 26 March – Vlatko Kovačević, Croatian/Yugoslav GM
- 1 April – Ilse Guggenberger, Colombian WIM, many time Colombian Women's Champion
- 6 April – Shimon Kagan in Tel Aviv, Israeli IM
- 19 April – Michael Valvo in New York, American IM active in computer chess
- 12 May – Dragoljub Velimirović in Valjevo, Serbian/Yugoslav GM
- 17 June – Dušan Rajković, Yugoslavian/Serbian GM
- 19 August – Milan Vukic, Yugoslavian/Bosnian GM
- 11 November – Bill Goichberg, President of the United States Chess Federation (USCF)
- 27 November – Vlastimil Jansa in Prague, Czech GM
- Larry Parr, American chess writer and editor

== Deaths ==
- Ilya Rabinovich evacuated from Leningrad but died of malnutrition in a hospital in Perm, Russia (World War II).
- Nikolai Riumin died in Omsk, Russia.
- Karl Wilhelm Rosenkrantz died in Latvia.
- Samuil Vainshtein died during the Siege of Leningrad.
- Henryk Friedman died, probably murdered in a Nazi concentration camp, General Government.
- Alexander Wagner died probably in Eastern Galicia, General Government.
- 23 February – Max Blümich died in Falkenberg/Elster, Germany.
- 7 March – Sergey Belavenets died in Novgorod, Russia. Killed in combat action. Moscow City Champion 1932, 1937, 1938.
- 8 March – José Raúl Capablanca died at the Mount Sinai Hospital, in New York City. World Chess Champion 1921–1927.
- 18 April – Leonid Kubbel died during the siege of Leningrad. Russian chess problemist.
- 29 April – Anatol Tschepurnoff died in Helsinki, Finland.
- 5 June – István Abonyi died in Budapest, Hungary.
- 8 July – Emil Zinner died in Nazi Majdanek concentration camp, General Government.
- 9 July – Julio Balparda died in Uruguay.
- August – Alexey Troitsky, founder of modern study composition, died of starvation in Leningrad, Russia.
- 16 August – Leon Rosen died in New York, USA.
- 20 August – Rudolf Spielmann died in Sweden (in exile).
- 21 August – Vladimir Sournin died in Baltimore, USA.
- 3 September – Leon Schwartzmann arrested in France, murdered in Auschwitz.
- December – Sergey Lebedev died in Russia.
