= Women's World Chess Championship 1956 =

The 1956 Women's World Chess Championship was won by Olga Rubtsova, who became the fourth women's champion.

The Candidates Tournament was won by Rubtsova. Instead of her playing the defending champion Elisabeth Bykova, however, FIDE decided that the championship would be decided between the top three female players: Rubtsova, Bykova, and Lyudmila Rudenko, ex-champion and loser of the last title match.

== 1955 Candidates Tournament ==
The Candidates Tournament was held in Moscow in October 1955. Rubtsova won narrowly, only half a point ahead of her closest competitor.

1955 Women's Candidates Tournament
	Player	1	2	3	4	5	6	7	8	9	10	11	12	13	14	15	16	17	18	19	20	Points	Tie break
1	Olga Rubtsova (Soviet Union)	-	0	0	1	½	½	1	1	½	½	1	1	1	1	1	1	1	1	1	1	15	
2	Larissa Volpert (Soviet Union)	1	-	½	½	½	1	½	1	1	½	1	½	1	½	½	1	1	½	1	1	14½	
3	Edith Keller-Herrmann (East Germany)	1	½	-	1	1	½	0	1	0	½	1	½	1	0	1	1	1	1	1	1	14	
4	Kira Zvorykina (Soviet Union)	0	½	0	-	1	1	1	1	0	1	½	1	0	1	½	1	1	1	1	1	13½	
5	Valentina Borisenko (Soviet Union)	½	½	0	0	-	1	½	0	½	½	½	1	1	1	1	1	1	1	1	1	13	
6	Verica Nedeljković (Yugoslavia)	½	0	½	0	0	-	½	0	1	½	1	1	1	½	1	1	1	1	1	1	12½	
7	Milunka Lazarević (Yugoslavia)	0	½	1	0	½	½	-	0	0	1	½	1	1	1	1	0	1	1	1	1	12	
8	Antonia Ivanova (Bulgaria)	0	0	0	0	1	1	1	-	1	½	½	1	1	1	0	1	½	1	½	½	11½	
9	Fenny Heemskerk (Netherlands)	½	0	1	1	½	0	1	0	-	½	½	0	1	0	0	1	0	1	1	1	10	
10	Olga Ignatieva (Soviet Union)	½	½	½	0	½	½	0	½	½	-	½	½	½	½	1	1	½	1	0	½	9½	84.25
11	Gisela Kahn Gresser (USA)	0	0	0	½	½	0	½	½	½	½	-	½	½	1	½	0	1	1	1	1	9½	70.50
12	Chantal Chaudé de Silans (France)	0	½	½	0	0	0	0	0	1	½	½	-	½	½	½	1	1	1	1	1	9½	67.75
13	Sonja Graf-Stevenson (USA)	0	0	0	1	0	0	0	0	0	½	½	½	-	1	1	1	1	1	1	1	9½	63.75
14	Eva Kertesz (Hungary)	0	½	1	0	0	½	0	0	1	½	0	½	0	-	1	0	½	0	½	1	7	
15	Josefa Gurfinkel (Soviet Union)	0	½	0	½	0	0	0	1	1	0	½	½	0	0	-	0	½	0	1	1	6½	53.75
16	Krystyna Hołuj (Poland)	0	0	0	0	0	0	1	0	0	0	1	0	0	1	1	-	0	½	1	1	6½	43.25
17	Mona May Karff (USA)	0	0	0	0	0	0	0	½	1	½	0	0	0	½	½	1	-	1	0	½	5½	
18	Celia Baudot de Moschini (Argentina)	0	½	0	0	0	0	0	0	0	0	0	0	0	1	1	½	0	-	1	½	4½	
19	Ruzena Sucha (Czechoslovakia)	0	0	0	0	0	0	0	½	0	1	0	0	0	½	0	0	1	0	-	1	4	
20	Berna Carrasco (Chile)	0	0	0	0	0	0	0	½	0	½	0	0	0	0	0	0	½	½	0	-	2	

== 1956 Championship Tournament ==
The championship tournament was held in Moscow in 1956. The three players each played 8-game mini-matches against each other, with Rubtsova eventually clinching the title.

Women's World Championship Tournament 1956
	Player	1	2	3	Total
1	Olga Rubtsova (Soviet Union)	-	4½	5½	10
2	Elisabeth Bykova (Soviet Union)	3½	-	6	9½
3	Lyudmila Rudenko (Soviet Union)	2½	2	-	4½
