= Women's World Chess Championship 1953 =

Sports competition

The 1953 Women's World Chess Championship was the first to feature a Candidates Tournament that produced a challenger for the reigning champion, much like the system used for the open championship title.

The first Candidates Tournament was won by Elisabeth Bykova, who went on to beat Lyudmila Rudenko and become the third Women's World Champion.

== 1952 Candidates Tournament ==
The Candidates Tournament was held in Moscow in October and November 1952, with Bykova eventually emerging the winner.

1952 Women's Candidates Tournament
	Player	1	2	3	4	5	6	7	8	9	10	11	12	13	14	15	16	Points	Tie break
1	Elisabeth Bykova (Soviet Union)	-	0	1	0	1	1	0	1	1	½	1	1	1	1	1	1	11½	
2	Fenny Heemskerk (Netherlands)	1	-	1	1	0	0	½	0	½	½	1	1	1	1	1	1	10½	69.00
3	Olga Ignatieva (Soviet Union)	0	0	-	½	½	1	1	0	1	1	1	1	½	1	1	1	10½	67.25
4	Valentina Belova (Soviet Union)	1	0	½	-	1	½	½	½	1	½	½	1	1	0	1	1	10	69.75
5	Edith Keller-Herrmann (East Germany)	0	1	½	0	-	1	½	0	½	½	1	1	1	1	1	1	10	62.75
6	Kira Zvorykina (Soviet Union)	0	1	0	½	0	-	1	½	0	1	1	1	1	1	1	1	10	61.00
7	Eileen Betsy Tranmer (England)	1	½	0	½	½	0	-	0	1	1	½	1	½	1	½	1	9	
8	Olga Rubtsova (Soviet Union)	0	1	1	½	1	½	1	-	0	0	0	0	½	½	1	1	8	58.50
9	Chantal Chaudé de Silans (France)	0	½	0	0	½	1	0	1	-	1	0	½	½	1	1	1	8	49.00
10	Jozsa Langos (Hungary)	½	½	0	½	½	0	0	1	0	-	1	0	1	1	1	1	8	48.50
11	Mona May Karff (USA)	0	0	0	½	0	0	½	1	1	0	-	1	1	1	0	1	7	
12	Rowena Mary Bruce (England)	0	0	0	0	0	0	0	1	½	1	0	-	½	1	0	1	5	
13	Nina Grushkova-Belska (Czechoslovakia)	0	0	½	0	0	0	½	½	½	0	0	½	-	0	1	1	4½	
14	Mary Bain (USA)	0	0	0	1	0	0	0	½	0	0	0	0	1	-	½	½	3½	
15	María Berea de Montero (Argentina)	0	0	0	0	0	0	½	0	0	0	1	1	0	½	-	0	3	
16	Salome Reischer (Austria)	0	0	0	0	0	0	0	0	0	0	0	0	0	½	1	-	1½	

== 1953 Championship Match ==
The championship match was played in Leningrad from 15 August to 20 September 1953. It was a 14-game event (the first player to reach 7.5 points will be the winner.) Bykova won three of the last four games and thus the title.

Women's World Championship Match 1953
	1	2	3	4	5	6	7	8	9	10	11	12	13	14	Total
Lyudmila Rudenko (Soviet Union)	1	1	0	0	½	0	0	½	1	1	0	0	1	0	6
Elisabeth Bykova (Soviet Union)	0	0	1	1	½	1	1	½	0	0	1	1	0	1	8
