= Heinz Nowarra =

German chess player

Heinz Nowarra (1897–1945?) was a German chess master.

Nowarra tied for 4-6th in Berlin City Chess Championship in 1938 (Kurt Richter won), shared first with Berthold Koch and Paul Mross at Berlin 1938 (GER-ch qual), tied for 15-16th at Bad Oeynhausen 1938 (the fifth GER-ch, Erich Eliskases won), tied for 9-10th at Berlin 1939 (Franz Mölbitz won), and took 10th at Berlin 1940 (Efim Bogoljubow won),

During World War II, Nowarra played in several tournaments under the auspices of General Government (occupied central Poland). He finished fifth in 1941 (Dr Walcker won) and second, behind Mross, in 1942 in the Kraków City championships, tied for 10-12th at Kraków/Warsaw 1941 (the second General Government-ch, Alexander Alekhine and Paul Felix Schmidt won), tied for 7-8th at Krynica 1943 (the fourth GG-ch, Josef Lokvenc won), took seventh at Radom 1944 (the fifth GG-ch, Bogoljubow won), and finished fifth in Kraków in May 1944 (Rudolf Teschner won).

Nowarra took also part in correspondence chess tournaments. In December 1944, his game against Klaus Junge had to be declared a draw, when Junge left for the front. As Luděk Pachman wrote, Nowarra probably shared the fate of his opponent, who died in the final days of World War II. To this day, there is no news about the fate of Nowarra.
