= General Government chess tournament =

Events in Nazi-occupied Poland (1942–44)

General Government chess championships (Schachmeisterschaft des Generalgouvernements) were Nazi tournaments held during World War II in occupied central Poland. Hans Frank, the Governor-General of General Government, was the patron of those tournaments because he was an avid chess player. The competition began when he organized a chess congress in Kraków on 3 November 1940. Six months later Frank announced the establishment of a chess school under Chess grandmasters, Yefim Bogolyubov and Alexander Alekhine.

== Historical context ==
A number of Polish chess players were arrested in January 1940. Jewish players were killed by Germans, e.g. Dawid Przepiórka. Ethnic Poles didn't participate in the tournaments.

== Participants ==
- Alexander Alekhine Russia/France
- Efim Bogoljubow Ukraine/Germany
- Paul Felix Schmidt Estonia/Germany
- Klaus Junge Chile/Germany
- Karl Gilg Czechoslovakia/Germany
- Josef Lokvenc Austria/Germany
- Hans Müller Austria/Germany
- Wolfgang Weil Austria/Germany
- Paul Mross Poland/Germany
- Teodor Regedziński Poland/Germany
- Leon Tuhan-Baranowski Poland/Germany
- Fedir Bohatyrchuk Ukraine/Soviet Union

and other German players /Germany.

Regedziński played as Theodore Reger, and Tuhan-Baranowski as Lisse.

== Kraków / Krynica / Warsaw 1940 ==
The first General Government Championship was held in Kraków, Krynica and Warsaw in 3–17 November 1940.

#	Player	1	2	3	4	5	6	7	8	9	10	11	12	Total
1	Anton Kohler	x	½	½	½	½	1	1	½	1	1	1	0	7½
2	Efim Bogoljubow	½	x	½	½	0	½	1	1	½	1	1	1	7½
3	Kurt Richter	½	½	x	½	1	½	0	1	1	1	½	½	7
4	Josef Lokvenc	½	½	½	x	1	0	½	0	½	1	½	1	6
5	Paul Mross	½	1	0	0	x	1	1	0	½	0	½	1	5½
6	Hans Müller	0	½	½	1	0	x	½	½	½	½	1	½	5½
7	Max Blümich	0	0	1	½	0	½	x	1	½	½	1	½	5½
8	Carl Ahues	½	0	0	1	1	½	0	x	½	½	1	½	5½
9	Karl Gilg	0	½	0	½	½	½	½	½	x	½	½	½	4½
10	Georg Kieninger	0	0	0	0	1	½	½	½	½	x	0	1	4
11	Ludwig Rellstab	0	0	½	½	½	0	0	0	½	1	x	1	4
12	Max Eisinger	1	0	½	0	0	½	½	½	½	0	0	x	3½

== Kraków / Warsaw 1941 ==
The second General Government Championship was held in Kraków and Warsaw in 5–19 October 1941.

#	Player	1	2	3	4	5	6	7	8	9	10	11	12	Total
1	Alexander Alekhine	x	1	1	½	½	1	1	½	1	½	½	1	8½
2	Paul Felix Schmidt	0	x	1	½	1	1	0	1	1	1	1	1	8½
3	Efim Bogoljubow	0	0	x	½	½	1	½	1	1	1	1	1	7½
4	Klaus Junge	½	½	½	x	½	1	½	½	1	½	½	1	7
5	Josef Lokvenc	½	0	½	½	x	0	½	½	½	½	1	1	5½
6	Teodor Regedziński	0	0	0	0	1	x	0	1	0	1	1	1	5
7	Georg Kieninger	0	1	½	½	½	1	x	½	0	½	0	0	4½
8	Eduard Hahn	½	0	0	½	½	0	½	x	1	1	½	0	4½
9	Max Blümich	0	0	0	0	½	1	1	0	x	½	1	½	4½
10	Carl Carls	½	0	0	½	½	0	½	0	½	x	1	0	3½
11	Heinz Nowarra	½	0	0	½	0	0	1	½	0	0	x	1	3½
12	Paul Mross	0	0	0	0	0	0	1	1	½	1	0	x	3½

== Warsaw / Lublin / Kraków 1942 ==
The third General Government Championship was held in Warsaw, Lublin and Kraków in 11–24 October 1942.

#	Player	1	2	3	4	5	6	7	8	9	10	11	Total
1	Alexander Alekhine	x	1	0	½	½	½	1	1	1	1	1	7½
2	Klaus Junge	0	x	½	½	1	1	0	½	1	1	1	6½
3	Efim Bogoljubow	1	½	x	1	½	1	1	0	½	0	½	6
4	Fritz Sämisch	½	½	0	x	1	0	1	½	½	1	½	5½
5	Rudolf Keller	½	0	½	0	x	1	0	1	½	1	1	5½
6	Georg Kieninger	½	0	0	1	0	x	1	0	½	1	1	5
7	Alfred Brinckmann	0	1	0	0	1	0	x	½	½	1	½	4½
8	Werner Kunerth	0	½	1	½	0	1	½	x	½	0	0	4
9	Wolfgang Weil	0	0	½	½	½	½	½	½	x	0	1	4
10	Hans Roepstorff	0	0	1	0	0	0	0	1	1	x	1	4
11	Hans Zollner	0	0	½	½	0	0	½	1	0	0	x	2½

== Krynica 1943 ==
The fourth General Government Championship was held in Krynica in 25 November–5 December 1943.

#	Player	1	2	3	4	5	6	7	8	9	10	Total
1	Josef Lokvenc	x	0	½	1	1	1	1	1	1	1	7½
2	Wilhelm Kuppe	1	x	0	½	½	1	1	1	1	½	6½
3	Efim Bogoljubow	½	1	x	0	½	1	½	1	1	1	6½
4	Georg Klaus	0	½	1	x	1	0	0	0	1	1	4½
5	Leon Tuhan-Baranowski	0	½	½	0	x	0	0	1	1	1	4
6	Hans Roepstorff	0	0	0	1	1	x	1	0	1	1	4
7	Edith Keller	0	0	½	1	1	0	x	0	0	1	3½
8	Heinz Nowarra	0	0	0	1	0	1	1	x	0	½	3½
9	Egon Gilles	0	0	0	0	0	1	1	1	x	0	3
10	Franz Herzog	0	½	0	0	0	0	0	½	1	x	2

== Radom 1944 ==
The fifth General Government Championship was held in Radom in February 1944.

#	Player	1	2	3	4	5	6	7	8	9	10	Total
1	Efim Bogoljubow	x	½	1	1	1	1	1	1	1	1	8½
2	Fedir Bohatyrchuk	½	x	½	1	1	1	1	1	1	1	8
3	Hans Roepstorff	0	½	x	1	1	1	1	1	1	1	7½
4	Leon Tuhan-Baranowski	0	0	0	x	½	½	1	1	1	1	5
5	Franz Herzog	0	0	0	½	x	0	1	1	1	1	4½
6	Planck	0	0	0	½	1	x	0	1	1	1	4½
7	Heinz Nowarra	0	0	0	0	0	1	x	1	1	1	4
8	Probst	0	0	0	0	0	0	0	x	1	1	2
9	Sänger	0	0	0	0	0	0	0	0	x	1	1
10	Meckel	0	0	0	0	0	0	0	0	0	x	0

== See also ==
- Football in occupied Poland (1939–45)
