= Walter Niephaus =

German chess player (1923–1992)

Walter Niephaus (March 30, 1923 – November 2, 1992, Andernach) was a German chess master.

== Biography ==
Born in Mörs am Niederrhein (now Moers), he won Frankfurt City Championship in March 1942, won ahead of Fritz Sämisch and Ludwig Rellstab at Bad Elster in May 1942. He took 11th at Bad Oeynhausen 1942 (the 9th German Chess Championship, Rellstab won), and won ahead of Klaus Junge at Leipzig 1942. In that year, he beat Alexander Alekhine in several simultan games.

After World War II, he shared 1st with Tröger at Kirchheim/Teck 1947, tied for 9-10th in Kassel (Efim Bogoljubow won), took 3rd in Riedenburg (Ludwig Roedl won), finished 1st ahead of Bogoljubow in Heringen, tied for 5-7th in Weidenau (the 11th GER-ch, Georg Kieninger won), and shared 2nd, behind Rellstab, in Stuttgart. In 1948, he tied for 3rd-5th in Bad Nauheim and 4-5th in Essen (the 12th GER-ch), both won by Wolfgang Unzicker.

In 1949, he won in Offenbach, shared 10th in Bad Pyrmont (the 13th GER-ch, Bogoljubow won), and tied for 6-8th in Heidelberg (Unzicker won). In 1950, he tied for 14-15th in Bad Pyrmont (the 1st FRG-ch, Unzicker won), and took 3rd in Saarbrücken (Albéric O'Kelly de Galway). In 1951, he took 3rd in Augsburg, took 2nd in Saarbrücken, both won by Bogoljubow, and took 9th in Düsseldorf (the 14th GER-ch, Rudolf Teschner won). He tied for 7-9th at Leipzig 1953 (the 15th GER-ch, Unzicker and Ludwig Schmitt won), shared 1st at Bad Salzuflen 1954, took 4th at Hoechst 1955 (the 3rd FRG-ch, Klaus Darga won), shared 10th at Wageningen 1957 (zonal, László Szabó won), and took 15th at Nuremberg 1959 (the 5th FRG-ch, Unzicker won).

In 1951, he played four matches; lost to Bogoljubow (1 : 5) and Herbert Heinicke (2.5 : 3.5), and won against Schifferdecker (9 : 1) and O'Kelly de Galway (3.5 : 1.5).

Niephaus represented West Germany in 12th Chess Olympiad at Moscow 1956, scoring +5 –2 =3 at first reserve board. He also played for FRG in friendly matches against Netherlands (1951, 1954, 1957), Yugoslavia (1951, 1954), Switzerland (1952) and Austria (1953), in the Clare Benedict Cup at Bern 1957 and Lugano 1959, and in the European Chess Team Championship at Oberhausen 1961.
