= Karl Gilg =

German chess player (1901–1981)

Karl Gilg (20 January 1901, in Mankovice (Mankendorf), Austrian Silesia – 4 December 1981, in Kolbermoor, Bavaria) was a German chess International Master from Czechoslovakia.

== Biography ==
Gilg played for Czechoslovakia in several Chess Olympiads.

- In 1927, at second board in 1st Olympiad in London (+5 −3 =5);
- In 1928, at first board in 2nd Olympiad in The Hague (+5 −3 =4);
- In 1931, at second board in 4th Olympiad in Prague (+2 −3 =6), team bronze;
- In 1936, at fifth board in 3rd unofficial Olympiad in Munich (+8 −3 =5).

In tournaments, he won at Aussig 1923, won at Chabařovice 1924, tied for 1st-2nd at Broumov 1925, took 2nd at Breslau 1925 (B tourn), took 2nd at Dresden 1926 (B tourn), won at Ostrava 1926, tied for 1st-2nd with Borislav Kostić at Trenčianske Teplice 1926, and won, jointly with Heinrich Wagner, at Vienna 1926 (DSV Kongress). He tied for 14–15th at Semmering 1926, though defeating Alexander Alekhine in their individual game (Rudolf Spielmann won). In 1927, he tied for 7–8th in Kecskemét (Alekhine won).

In 1928, he won in Šumperk. In 1929, he took 20th in Karlovy Vary (Carlsbad; Aron Nimzowitsch won). In 1930, he won in Olomouc. In 1930, he tied for 3rd–5th in Štubnianske Teplice (Andor Lilienthal won). In 1933, he tied for 8–9th in Ostrava (Ernst Grünfeld won). In 1934, he tied for 1st-2nd with Hans Müller in Klosterneuburg. In 1934, he took 3rd in Bad Liebwerda (13th DSV Kongress; Salo Flohr won). In 1935, he won in Konstantinsbad (14th DSV Kongress). In 1937, he won in Teplice). In 1937, he took 7th in Prague (Paul Keres won).

In 1938, Gilg changed his citizenship to become German. That year he won in Gablonz, and tied for 4–5th in Bad Elster (Efim Bogoljubow won). In 1939, he took 3rd in Bad Oeynhausen (the 6th GER-ch; Erich Eliskases won). In 1940, he tied for 3rd–4th in Bad Oeynhausen (7th GER-ch; Georg Kieninger won), and took 9th at Kraków/Krynica/Warsaw (the 1st GG-ch, Bogoljubow and Anton Kohler won). In 1943, he tied for 6–7th in Vienna (10th GER-ch; Josef Lokvenc won).

After World War II, he lived in West Germany. In May 1949, he tied for 26–27th in Bad Pyrmont (3rd West GER-ch; Bogoljubow won). In 1951, he took 4th in Düsseldorf (GER-ch; Rudolf Teschner won). In 1953, he took 4th in Berlin (FRG-ch; Wolfgang Unzicker won). In 1954 and 1963, he won FRG Cup championships. Gilg played for Germany (FRG) in 1st European Team Championship at Vienna 1957, where, as first reserve, he scored 1/4 (+0 =2 −2).

In 1953, Gilg was awarded the International Master title.
