= Edith Keller-Herrmann =

German chess player (1921–2010)

Edith Keller-Herrman
- Born: 17 November 1921
- Died: 12 May 2010 (aged 88)
- Occupation: Chess Master
- Years active: 1939-1977

Edith Keller-Herrmann (17 November 1921 – 12 May 2010) was a German woman chess master. She was born in Dresden.

== Career ==
In August 1939, Keller (17 years old), along with Klaus Junge (15), Wolfgang Unzicker (14), Rudolf Kunath (15) and Karl Krbavac (17), played in Jugendschachwoche Fürstenwalde near Berlin. During World War II, she won the second German Women's Championship at Bad Oeynhausen 1942. In the next German Women's Championship, she took third place, behind Gertrud Jürgens and Maja Schlemmer, at Vienna 1943, and tied for seventh-eighth at Bad Krynica 1943 (the fourth General Government chess tournament, Josef Lokvenc won).

After the war, Keller-Hermann was the German Women's Champion in 1947, 1948, 1951, 1952 and 1953, and the Eastern German Women's Champion in 1950, 1952, 1956, 1957 and 1960.

In 1949/50, she competed in the Women's World Championship tournament in Moscow, tying for fifth-seventh place (Lyudmila Rudenko won). In 1951, she tied for 11–12th in Dortmund (Albéric O'Kelly de Galway won) but drew with Efim Bogoljubow and won games against Rossolimo and Puc. In the early 1950s, she was arguably most successful out of all female chess players when playing against men. In 1952, she tied for fourth-sixth in Moscow (Women's Candidates Tournament; Elisabeth Bykova won). In 1955, she took third place in Moscow (Women's Candidates Tournament; Olga Rubtsova won). In 1959, she tied for fourth-fifth in Plovdiv (Women's Candidates Tournament; Kira Zvorykina won).

Keller-Hermann played for East Germany in several Women's Chess Olympiads; at first board at Emmen 1957, Split 1963, Oberhausen 1966, and at second board at Lublin 1969. She won three team bronze medals and two individual medals (silver in 1957, and bronze in 1963).

She was awarded the Woman International Master (WIM) title in 1950 and the Woman Grandmaster (WGM) title in 1977.

Keller-Hermann was the sister of Rudolf Keller. She died in May 2010 in Ingolstadt.
