= Friedrich Nürnberg =

German chess player (1909–1984)

Friedrich Nürnberg (8 August 1909 – 10 November 1984) was a German chess master.

He took 12th at Bad Oeynhausen 1941 (the 8th German Chess Championship won by Paul Felix Schmidt and Klaus Junge), won ahead of Georg Klaus at Regensburg 1942 (the South German championship), shared 7th at Bad Oeynhausen 1942 (the 9th GER-ch, Ludwig Rellstab), took 14th at Augsburg 1946 (Wolfgang Unzicker won), took 5th at Riedenburg 1947 (Ludwig Rödl won), tied for 6-10th at Weidenau 1947 (the 1st Allied-occupied Germany-ch, Georg Kieninger won), tied for 9-10th at Essen 1948 (the 2nd Western zone-ch, Unzicker won), tied for 28-32nd at Bad Pyrmont 1949 (the 3rd Western zone-ch, Efim Bogoljubow won), took 8th at Augsburg 1951 (Bogoljubow won).
