= List of Honoured Masters of Sport of the USSR in chess =

Honored Master of Sport was a Soviet state honour, introduced on 27 May 1934 by the Central Executive Committee of the Soviet Union. It was awarded by the State Committee for Physical Culture and Sport to athletes, including chess players, for outstanding performance. The award was in the form of a badge and certificate. 22 athletes were selected for this award in June 1934, including Pyotr Romanovsky. Out of over 4000 awards, 52 were given to chess players, including three problem composers and two correspondence chess players. Though normally conferred for life, it was revoked in the case of Alla Kushnir and Viktor Korchnoi following their defection from the Soviet Union. Mark Taimanov also had his award revoked in 1971 following his crushing defeat at the hands of Bobby Fischer, but this was restored in 1991.

== Title holders ==
| Year | Name | Other title |
|---|---|---|
| 1934 | Pyotr Romanovsky | International Master |
| 1940 | Nikolai Riumin |
| 1941 | Viktor Goglidze | International Master |
| 1942 | Fedor Duz-Khotimirsky | International Master |
| 1943 | Vladimir Makogonov | Grandmaster (retrospective award) |
| 1945 | Mikhail Botvinnik | Grandmaster |
| 1947 | Nikolai Zubarev | International Master |
| 1947 | Grigory Levenfish | Grandmaster |
| 1947 | Vladimir Nenarokov | International Master |
| 1948 | Isaac Boleslavsky | Grandmaster |
| 1948 | Igor Bondarevsky | Grandmaster |
| 1948 | Paul Keres | Grandmaster |
| 1948 | Alexander Kotov | Grandmaster |
| 1948 | Andor Lilienthal | Grandmaster |
| 1948 | Viacheslav Ragozin | Grandmaster |
| 1948 | Vasily Smyslov | Grandmaster |
| 1948 | Salo Flohr | Grandmaster |
| 1950 | Vladas Mikėnas | Grandmaster (retrospective award) |
| 1951 | David Bronstein | Grandmaster |
| 1952 | Pyotr Dubinin | International Master |
| 1952 | Olga Rubtsova | Woman Grandmaster |
| 1953 | Elisaveta Bykova | International Master |
| 1953 | Lyudmila Rudenko | International Master |
| 1956 | Genrikh Kasparyan | Grandmaster of Chess Composition |
| 1957 | Kira Zvorykina | Woman Grandmaster |
| 1960 | Vladimir Korolkov | Grandmaster of Chess Composition |
| 1960 | Viktor Korchnoi | Grandmaster |
| 1960 | Tigran Petrosian | Grandmaster |
| 1960 | Mikhail Tal | Grandmaster |
| 1962 | Lev Loshinsky | Grandmaster of Chess Composition |
| 1963 | Efim Geller | Grandmaster |
| 1964 | Nona Gaprindashvili | Grandmaster |
| 1965 | Yuri Averbakh | Grandmaster |
| 1965 | Boris Spassky | Grandmaster |
| 1965 | Leonid Stein | Grandmaster |
| 1967 | Tatiana Zatulovskaya | Woman Grandmaster |
| 1969 | Lev Polugaevsky | Grandmaster |
| 1971 | Nana Alexandria | Woman Grandmaster |
| 1972 | Alla Kushnir | Woman Grandmaster |
| 1974 | Anatoly Karpov | Grandmaster |
| 1978 | Maia Chiburdanidze | Grandmaster |
| 1985 | Garry Kasparov | Grandmaster |
| 1986 | Irina Levitina | Woman Grandmaster |
| 1987 | Elena Akhmilovskaya | Woman Grandmaster |
| 1987 | Artur Yusupov | Grandmaster |
| 1989 | Rafael Vaganian | Grandmaster |
| 1990 | Liudmila Belavenets | ICCF Grandmaster |
| 1990 | Alexander Beliavsky | Grandmaster |
| 1990 | Marta Litinskaya | Woman Grandmaster |
| 1991 | Vladimir Zagorovsky | ICCF Grandmaster |
| 1991 | Mark Taimanov | Grandmaster |

== See also ==
- Chess title
