= Max Blümich =

German chess player (1886–1942)

Reinhold Max Blümich (Bluemich) (3 November 1886 – 23 February 1942, Falkenberg/Elster) was a German chess master and editor.

At the beginning of his chess career, he played in Leipzig where tied for 4-6th in 1909, took 8th in 1910, took 3rd in 1911, shared 1st in 1912, and took 5th in 1913.

After World War I, he won or shared 1st at Mittwerda 1922, Frankfurt 1923, Leipzig 1923, Magdeburg 1924, Chemnitz 1925, Leipzig 1928, Bautzen 1929, and Leipzig 1930. He also took 11th at Breslau 1925 (the 24th DSB Congress, Efim Bogoljubow won), took 9th at Dresden 1926 (Aron Nimzowitsch won), tied for 10-11th at Vienna 1926 (Karl Gilg and Heinrich Wagner won), took 10th at Duisburg 1929 (the 26th DSB-Congress, Carl Ahues won), shared 3rd at Zwickau 1930 (Karl Helling won), tied for 4-6th at Bad Liebenwerda 1934 (Salo Flohr won), tied for 14-15th at Bad Aachen 1935 (the 3rd German Chess Championship, Kurt Richter won), and took 7th at Bad Elster 1937 (Ludwig Rellstab and Bogoljubow won).

R. Max Bluemich represented Germany in matches against The Netherlands at Berlin 1922 and Austria at Vienna 1926. He also played for Germany in the 2nd Chess Olympiad at The Hague 1928 with a result of +5 –4 =4.

During World War II, he tied for 5-8th at Kraków / Krynica / Warsaw 1940 (the 1st General Government chess tournament, Bogoljubow and Anton Kohler won), took 7th at Bad Elster 1941 (Klaus Junge won), and tied for 7-9th at Kraków / Warsaw 1941 (the 2nd GG-ch, Alexander Alekhine and Paul Felix Schmidt won).

In 1925–1942, he was an editor of the first German chess magazine Deutsche Schachzeitung. He was the author of an infamous 1941 edition of the Kleine Lehrbuch des Schachspiels, by Jean Dufresne and Jacques Mieses, opportunistically changed, omitting and modifying the references to chess personalities with Jewish background.
