= Alfred Brinckmann =

Alfred Brinckmann (3 January 1891 – 30 May 1967) was a German chess International Master, author and functionary from Kiel.

== The chess player ==
He participated eight times in the German Chess Championship in the period 1921-1949. His greatest success took place at Berlin 1927, where he took first place ahead of considerable masters such as Aron Nimzowitsch, Efim Bogoljubow and Friedrich Sämisch.

During World War II, when Ehrhardt Post was the Chief Executive of the Grossdeutscher Schachbund, Brinckmann took 16th at Bad Oeynhausen 1940 (7th GER-ch, Georg Kieninger won); took 3rd at Hamburg 1941 (Klaus Junge and Herbert Heinicke won); took 7th at Warsaw/Lublin/Kraków 1942 (the 3rd General Government chess tournament, Alexander Alekhine won), and took 3rd at Madrid 1943 (Paul Keres won).

In 1953 he became an International Master. In 1965 he was appointed an honorary member of the Kieler Schachgesellschaft.

== The author ==
He wrote numerous books, among them several biographies (i.e. about Efim Bogoljubov) and tournament reports. There is a controversial book Chess master in the fight: Views for the chess of the present (1940), in which some Nazi ideas were represented.

== The functionary ==
In the post-war period, he also worked considerably at the reestablishment of the German chess federation - Deutscher Schachbund (DSB). Brinckmann was a secretary of the DSB (1950–1967), and an arbiter (1962–1967). He was awarded the Golden honour needle of the German Chess Federation in 1966.
