= Rudolf Keller =

German chess player

Rudolf Keller (16 June 1917 – 28 November 1993) was a German chess master.

Born in Dresden, he was the brother of Edith Keller-Herrmann. In 1935–1938, he won Dresden and Saxony championships. He took 4th at Berlin 1938, shared 1st with Ludwig Rellstab and Paul Michel at Bad Warmbrunn 1939, played in a match Germany vs. Hungary in Karlsbad in April 1939, tied for 6–7th at Vienna 1939, shared 6th at Bad Oeynhausen 1939 (the 6th German Chess Championship, Erich Eliskases won), tied for 6–9th at Bad Oeynhausen 1940 (the 7th GER-ch, Georg Kieninger won), took 2nd, behind Klaus Junge, at Dresden 1942, tied for 9–10th at Choceň 1942 (Miroslav Katětov won), and tied for 4–5th at Warsaw/Lublin/Kraków 1942 (the 3rd General Government chess tournament won by Alexander Alekhine).

After World War II, he won the Saxony championships in 1949, and played in a GDR vs. CSR match in 1957. He was awarded the International Master title in 1950.
