= Hans Müller (chess player) =

Austrian chess player (1896–1971)

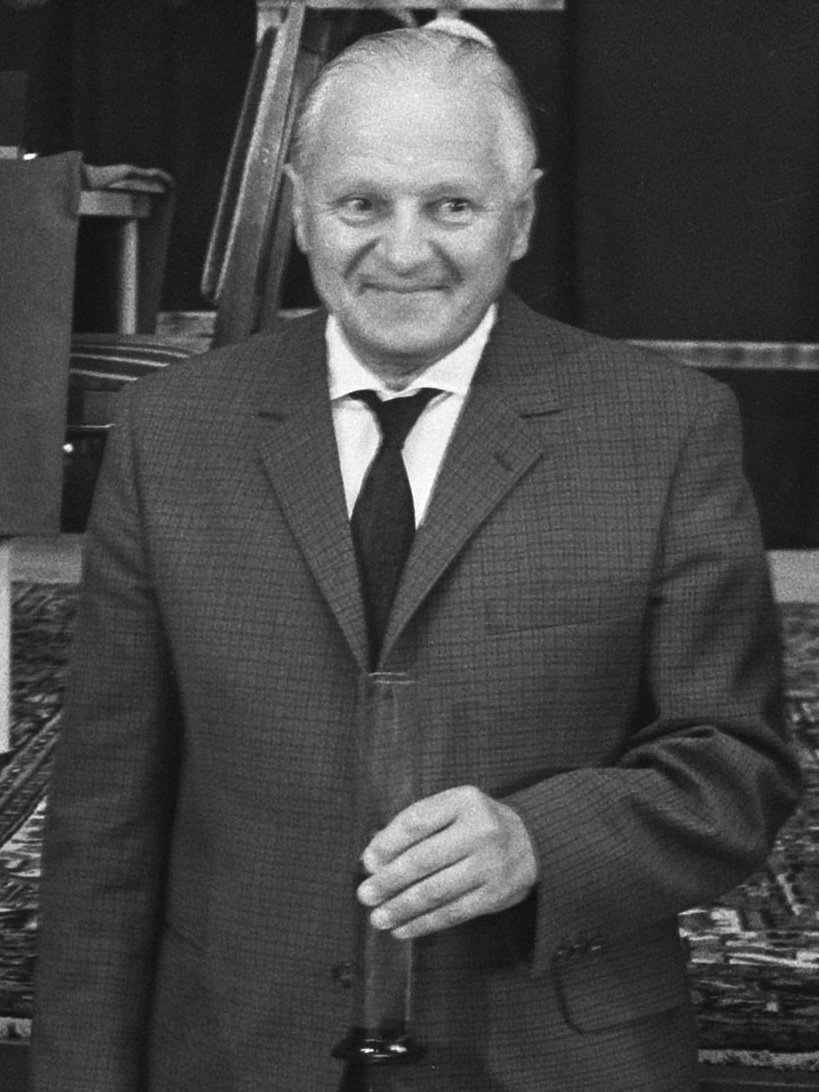
Hans Müller (1969)

Hans Müller (1 December 1896, Vienna – 28 February 1971, Vienna) was an Austrian chess player, theoretician and author of books.

In 1921, he played in Vienna; he tied for 9-10th (Friedrich Sämisch won), tied for 1st-2nd with Gruber, and took 6th (Vladimir Vuković won). In 1922, he tied for 4-5th in Innsbruck (Ernst Grünfeld and Rudolf Spielmann won). In 1923, he tied for 4-6th in Budapest (Endre Steiner won). In 1924, he tied for 8-9th in Györ. In 1925, he tied for 1st-2nd in Debrecen. In 1925, he tied for 5-6th in Vienna. In 1926, he took 7th in Bardejov (Bardiov). The event was won by (Hermanis Matisons and Savielly Tartakower. In 1926, he tied for 7-9th in Trenčianske Teplice (Trentschin-Teplitz, Trencsénteplic). The event was won by Karl Gilg and Borislav Kostić. In 1926, he tied for 5-6th in Hyères (Abraham Baratz won). In 1926, he tied for 8-9th in Vienna (10th Trebitsch-Turnier). The event was won by Spielmann. In 1927, he took 9th in Kecskemét (Alexander Alekhine won). In 1927, he tied for 1st with Albert Becker in Vienna. In 1928, he took 8th in Vienna (Richard Réti won). In 1929/30, he took 3rd in Vienna (13th Trebitsch). The event was won by Hans Kmoch and Spielmann. In 1931, he tied for 7-8th in Vienna (14th Trebitsch; Becker won). In 1932, he tied for 5-7th in Vienna (15th Trebitsch; Becker won).

In 1932, Hans Müller won the European Correspondence Chess Championship (IFSB) ahead of Eduard Dyckhoff. In 1933, he won ahead of Erich Eliskases in Ebensee. In 1933, he tied for 1st with Grünfeld in Vienna (16th Trebitsch). In 1934, he tied for 1st with Gilg in Klosterneuburg. In 1934, he took 3rd, behind Becker and Eliskases, in Linz. In 1934, he tied for 2nd-4th in Vienna (17th Trebitsch; Becker won). In 1935, he took 8th in Tatatovaros (László Szabó won. In 1935, he tied for 3rd-5th in Vienna (18th Trebitsch; Lajos Steiner and Eliskases won). In 1937/38, he tied for 3rd-5th in Vienna (20th Trebitsch; Lajos Steiner won).

Hans Müller played for Austria five times in the Chess Olympiads and once in unofficial at Munich 1936.

- In 1928, he played at third board at 2nd Chess Olympiad in The Hague (+5 –2 =9).
- In 1930, he played at second board at 3rd Chess Olympiad in Hamburg (+7 –5 =4).
- In 1933, he played at fourth board at 5th Chess Olympiad in Folkestone (+6 –1 =6).
- In 1935, he played at fourth board at 6th Chess Olympiad in Warsaw (+4 –2 =10).
- In 1936, he played at fourth board at unofficial Olympiad in Munich (+8 –2 =8).
- In 1950, he played at third board at 9th Chess Olympiad in Dubrovnik (+3 –4 =6).

He won individual bronze medal at Folkestone 1933.

After the Anschluss, he took 2nd, behind Eliskases, in Vienna in June 1939. Then, in July 1939, he tied for 10-13th in Bad Oeynhausen (7th GER-ch). The event was won by Eliskases. In May 1940, he took 3rd in Bad Elster (Gilg and Rödl won). In November 1940, he tied for 5-8th in Kraków/Krynica/Warsaw (1st GG-ch). The event was won by (Efim Bogoljubow and Kohler. In August 1941, he took 4th in Bad Oeynhausen (8th GER-ch). The event was won by Paul Felix Schmidt and Klaus Junge. In July 1942, he tied for 2nd-3rd, behind Ludwig Rellstab, in Bad Oeynhausen (9th GER-ch). In September 1942, he tied for 3rd-5th in Munich (Qualification Tournament). In August 1943, he took 4th in Vienna (10th GER-ch). The event was won by Josef Lokvenc. In 1943, he took 8th in Vienna (Hietzing; Ivan Lešnik won). In December 1943, he took 2nd, behind Grünfeld, in Vienna. In 1944, he won in Posen (Reichsmeisterschaft «Kraft durch Freude»).

After World War II, Müller played in several Austrian championships since 1947 till 1960. He took 6th in Vienna (2nd Schlechter Memorial) in 1947. The event was won by Szabó. In 1949, he took 14th in Venice (Szabó won). In 1949, he tied for 8-9th in Vienna (3rd Schlechter Memorial). The event was won by Jan Foltys and Puc. In 1949/50, he took 5th in Lucerne (Blau won). In 1950, he took 14th in Venice (Alexander Kotov won). In 1950, he tied for 8-9th in Vienna (Paoli won). In 1951, he tied for 8-9th in Vienna (4th Schlechter Memorial). The event was won by Moshe Czerniak. In 1957, he tied for 7-8th in San Benedetto del Tronto (Gedeon Barcza won).

Hans Müller played for Austria in friendly matches against Czechoslovakia (1949), Italy (1951, 1952) and the Soviet Union (1953). He was awarded the IM title in 1950.
