= Georg Klaus =

German chess player (1912–1974)

Georg Klaus (28 December 1912, Nuremberg – 29 July 1974, Berlin) was a German philosopher, cybernetician, chess master, and functionary.

In 1928, he started his chess career in Nuremberg, playing at Arbeiterschachklub Nürnberg, then Nürnberger Schachklub Noris. In 1933, he won in the Franconian championships. In that time, he began to study mathematics at the University of Erlangen in 1932, and became a member of the Communist Party of Germany (KPD). In 1933, he was arrested by Nazis, and spent two years in a Nuremberg prison and three years in the Dachau concentration camp, until 1939.

After his releasing, he worked in a factory (Faber-Castell bzw. Schwan-Bleistift), and again played chess in Nuremberg (Schachklub Noris). During World War II, he took 2nd, behind Friedrich Nürnberg, in Regensburg in March/April 1942 (the South German championship), shared 2nd with Hans Müller, behind Ludwig Rellstab, in Bad Oeynhausen in June/July 1942 (the 9th German Chess Championship), and took 4th in Bad Krynica in November/December 1943 (the 4th General Government chess tournament, Josef Lokvenc won).

In October 1942, he was drafted into the Wehrmacht, and sent to the Eastern Front in March 1943. He fought in the Kharkov region and in the Battle of Kursk in July 1943. He was injured in combat, and awarded the Iron Cross, 2nd Class. Then, he spent several weeks in a field hospital in Bad Blankenburg, Thuringia. In March 1945 he was in the Western Front, and after Western Allied invasion of Germany, he had been taken into Allied captivity. From April to September 1945, he was kept in an American army camp (Lager 2227) in Ostend, Belgium.

After his release on 2 September 1945, he returned to Nuremberg, and next to Bad Blankenburg, then the Soviet occupation zone. In February 1946, he became a political functionary of KPD and the Socialist Unity Party of Germany (SED) in Sonneberg, Thüringen. He received a doctorate of pedagogy (1948), and a habilitation in philosophy (1950) from the University of Jena, Thuringia. In 1953, he played in a friendly match GDR vs. Bulgaria in Sofia, and was the Präsident der Sektion Schach der DDR in 1953/54.

From 1953, he worked at the Humboldt University of Berlin, and from 1959 in the Academy of Sciences of the German Democratic Republic. Klaus published in 1963 a collection of papers on "Cybernetics in Science, Technology, and Economics in the GDR." After fighting a running battle with bureaucracy in the journals from 1963 on, Klaus was asked to prepare a "Cybernetic Dictionary" as his contribution to the Seventh Congress of the SED in 1967.
