= Josefa Gurfinkel =

USSR and Russian chess player

Personal information
- Full name: Josefa Alexandrovna Gurfinkel
- Born: 2 May 1919 Rostov-on-Don, Russia
- Died: 9 April 1997 (aged 77) Volgograd, Russia

Chess career
- Country: Soviet Union; Russia
- Title: Woman International Master (1954)

Josefa Alexandrovna Gurfinkel (Юзефа Александровна Гурфинкель; 2 May 1919 – 9 April 1997) was a Jewish Russian-born Soviet chess player who held the FIDE title of Woman International Master (1954). Her given name is also transliterated as Yuzefa or Iosifa.

== Biography ==
Her first trainer was Igor Bondarevsky. In 1939, she won Rostov Oblast Women's Chess Championship. In 1950, she shared 1st-2nd place in the Russian SFSR Women's Chess Championship, but lost additional match for title to Vera Tikhomirova. She was a member of the Russian SFSR team who won the Soviet Team Chess Championship in 1951. Gurfinkel participated in Moscow City Women's Chess Championship, where best result reached in 1954 when she shared 3rd-4th place. Gurfinkel participated in Women's Soviet Chess Championship nine times (1947–1968). Her best result was 2nd place in 1954 (tournament won Larissa Volpert). In 1955, Gurfinkel participated in the Women's World Chess Championship Candidates Tournament in Moscow and shared 15th-16th place with Krystyna Hołuj.

In 1941 she graduated from Rostov State University Faculty of Philology. She worked as a trainer in the Rostov city chess club, the House of Scientists and in the Palace of Pioneers. Chairman of the Women's Committee of Rostov Oblast Chess Section. In 1963, together with her husband, chess master Alexander Konstantinov (1909–1998), she moved to Volgograd and continued to work as a chess trainer. Her daughter Tatyana Moiseeva (born 1951) is chess master.

Gurfinkel was awarded the Soviet Master of Sports title in 1950. In 1954 she awarded the FIDE Woman International Master (WIM) title.

== Literature ==
- Игорь Бердичевский. Шахматная еврейская энциклопедия. Москва: Русский шахматный дом, 2016 (Igor Berdichevsky. The Chess Jewish Encyclopedia. Moscow: Russian Chess House, 2016, p. 84) ISBN 978-5-94693-503-6
