= Leon Tuhan-Baranowski =

Polish-Belarusian chess player and composer

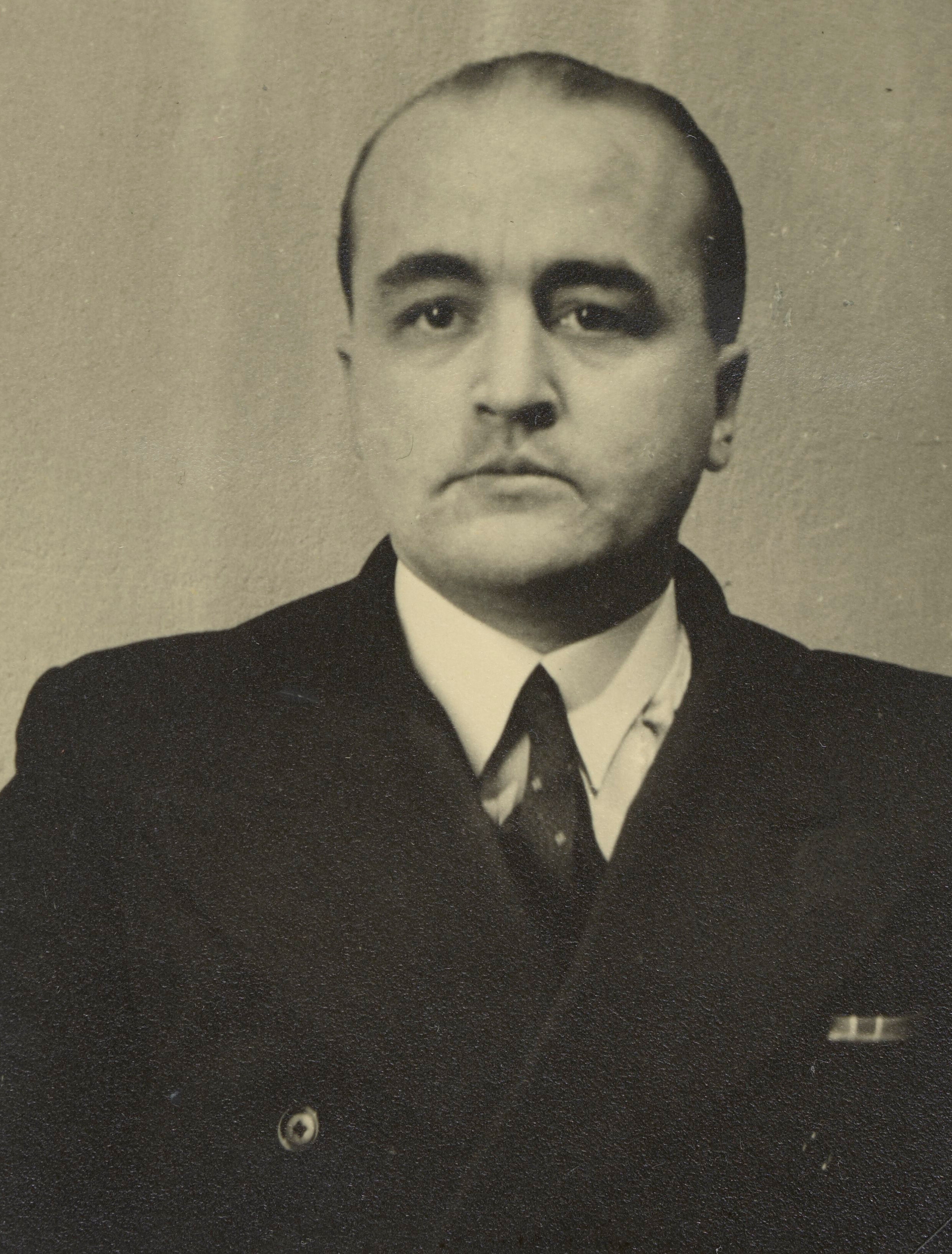
Leon Tuhan-Baranowski in 1937

Leon Tuhan-Baranowski (22 June 1907, St Petersburg – 27 April 1954, Frankfurt) was a Polish-Belarusian chess player and composer.

Born in Saint Petersburg into a Roman Catholic family with noble roots (Tartar and Belarusian descent). After the Bolshevik Revolution, he moved to Stolpce (Stowbtsy) near Novogrodek, and then to Warsaw. In 1925, he took 10th in Warsaw (Stanisław Kohn won). In 1925–26, he tied for 7–8th in Warsaw (the 1st Polish Chess Championship, elimination). The event was won by Abram Blass and Paulin Frydman. In 1930s, his activity concentrated in a few areas (correspondence chess, various local and team tournaments). Among others he participated in the 2nd Polish Team Chess Championship at Katowice 1934.

Tuhan-Baranowski was also a composer and author of chess books. His debut took place in 1924 when he published on columns of Deutsche Schachzeitung. He co-operated with L’Echiquier, Kagans Neueste Schachnachrichten, Die Schwalbe, Dzień Polski, Strzelec, Czas, etc.

During World War II, Tuhan-Baranowski had declared Belarusian nationality and became an interpreter for the Wehrmacht on the Eastern Front (1941–1942). Then, in 1943–1944, he lived in General Government (occupied central Poland). He played as Lisse in several chess tournaments in GG. In December 1943, he tied for 5–6th in Krynica (the 4th GG-ch, Josef Lokvenc won). In February 1944, he took 4th, behind Efim Bogoljubow, Fedor Bogatyrchuk, and Hans Roepstorff, in Radom. In August 1944, he met a German chess player August Mund in Łódź. At the end of the war, he escaped to West Germany (US Zone) where he published as Wormatius. He won a prize for three-move theme (co-author A. Goldstein) in Revista Romana de Sah in 1948. He died in a car accident in Frankfurt am Main.
