= Clarice Benini =

Italian chess player (1905–1976)

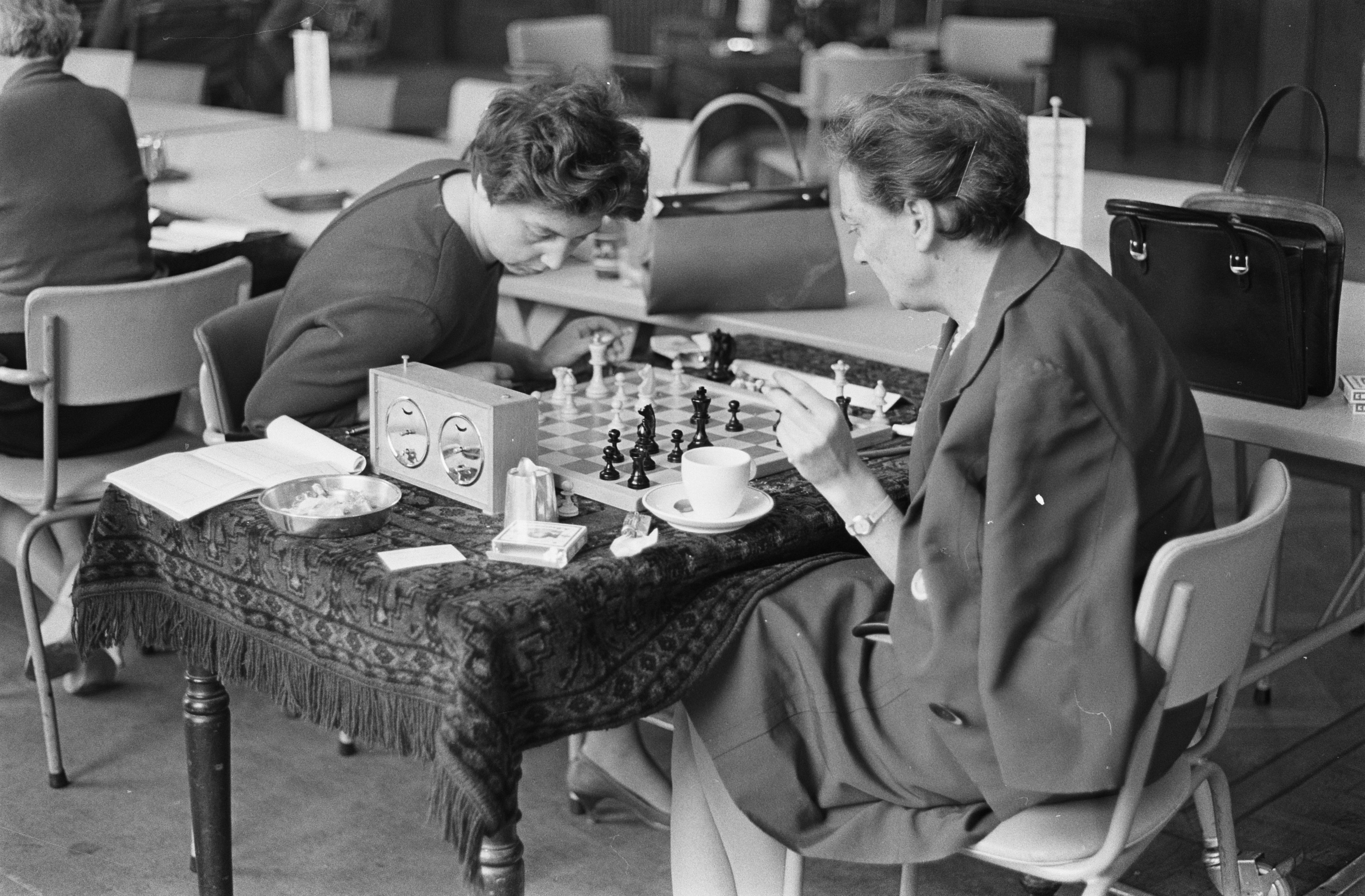
Corry Vreeken vs. Benini (Amsterdam, 1962)

Clarice Benini (8 January 1905 – 6 September 1976) was an Italian chess player. She was awarded the title International Woman Master by FIDE in 1950.

Benini was born in Florence. In 1936, she finished second, behind Sonja Graf, in Semmering, Austria. The next year, Benini also came second in the Women's World Championship at Stockholm, behind Vera Menchik and ahead of Sonja Graf, Milda Lauberte, Mary Bain, Mona May Karff, and others. She was the twice Italian women's champion, winning at Milan 1938 and Rome 1939.

Benini took ninth place in the 1949/50 Women's World Championship in Moscow, which was won by Ludmila Rudenko. She tied for 3rd-4th at Venice 1951 (Women's World Championship zonal), won at Gardone 1956, took 6th at Venice 1957 (zonal), won at Amsterdam 1957, and took 2nd at Beverwijk 1958. On 6 September 1976, Benini was murdered by her neighbour, an insane farmer, in Poggio a Vico, Rufina, Florence.
