= Roepstorff =

Roepstorff is a German-origin Danish surname. Notable persons include:

- Frederik Adolph de Roepstorff (1842–1883), Danish ethnologist and penal colony superintendent
- Hans Roepstorff (1910–1945), German chess player
- Jens Erik Roepstorff (born 1960), Danish handball player
- Kirstine Roepstorff (born 1972), Danish visual artist
