= Women's World Chess Championship 1949–50 =

The 8th Women's World Chess Championship took place from 20 December 1949 to 16 January 1950 in Moscow, Russia. The title had been vacant since the death of Vera Menchik in 1944. The round-robin tournament was won by Lyudmila Rudenko. Just as Mikhail Botvinnik's round robin win in 1948 after the death of the previous champion Alexander Alekhine began an era of 24 years of Soviet domination in open chess, so did Lyudmila Rudenko's round robin win in 1950 after the death of the previous champion Vera Menchik began an era of 41 years of Soviet domination in women's chess.

The final results were as follows:

	Player	1	2	3	4	5	6	7	8	9	10	11	12	13	14	15	16	Points	Tie break
1	Lyudmila Rudenko (Soviet Union)	-	1	1	½	½	½	½	1	1	1	1	0	1	1	½	1	11½	
2	Olga Rubtsova (Soviet Union)	0	-	1	1	½	½	½	0	½	1	1	1	1	1	1	½	10½	
3	Elisaveta Bykova (Soviet Union)	0	0	-	½	1	1	1	1	0	1	½	1	½	1	½	1	10	68.25
4	Valentina Belova (Soviet Union)	½	0	½	-	1	1	1	0	0	0	1	1	1	1	1	1	10	67.75
5	Edith Keller (East Germany)	½	½	0	0	-	1	0	1	1	½	1	1	0	1	1	1	9½	62.00
6	Eileen Betsy Tranmer (England)	½	½	0	0	0	-	1	1	1	½	½	1	1	1	½	1	9½	61.75
7	Chantal Chaudé de Silans (France)	½	½	0	0	1	0	-	1	0	½	1	1	1	1	1	1	9½	60.00
8	Fenny Heemskerk (Netherlands)	0	1	0	1	0	0	0	-	1	½	½	1	1	½	1	½	8	
9	Clarice Benini (Italy)	0	½	1	1	0	0	1	0	-	0	0	0	½	1	1	1	7	
10	Jozsa Langos (Hungary)	0	0	0	1	½	½	½	½	1	-	½	0	0	0	1	½	6	44.25
11	María Teresa Mora (Cuba)	0	0	½	0	0	½	0	½	1	½	-	1	1	1	0	0	6	38.75
12	Gisela Kahn Gresser (USA)	1	0	0	0	0	0	0	0	1	1	0	-	1	0	0	1	5	32.50
13	Nina Grushkova-Belska (Czechoslovakia)	0	0	½	0	1	0	0	0	½	1	0	0	-	½	1	½	5	32.50
14	Mona May Karff (USA)	0	0	0	0	0	0	0	½	0	1	0	1	½	-	1	1	5	21.00
15	Ingrid Larsen (Denmark)	½	0	½	0	0	½	0	0	0	0	1	1	0	0	-	1	4½	
16	Róża Germanova (Poland)	0	½	0	0	0	0	0	½	0	½	1	0	½	0	0	-	3	
