= Paul Mross =

Polish-German chess player

- Born: January 23, 1910; Chorzów, Province of Silesia, Kingdom of Prussia, German Empire
- Died: January 17, 1991 (aged 80)
- Occupation: chess master

Paul Mross (Paweł Mróz) (23 January 1910, in Bismarckhütte (now Chorzów) – 17 January 1991, in Düsseldorf) was a Polish–German chess master.

== Biography ==
Born in Bismarckhütte (now Chorzów), Upper Silesia, he won the Silesian Chess Championship in 1929, and played for Silesia at second board in the 1st Polish Team Championship at Królewska Huta (Königshütte) 1929 (the Warsaw team won). In early 1930s, he moved to Berlin. In 1935, he tied for 3rd-4th in Swinemünde. He played in Berlin championships; tied for 7-8th in 1936, and tied for 4-6th in 1938 (both won by Kurt Richter). In Spring 1939, he took 2nd, behind Franz Mölbitz, at Café Victoria in Berlin-Kreuzberg.

During World War II, he tied for 5-8th in the 1st General Government chess tournament at Kraków–Krynica–Warsaw 1940 (Efim Bogoljubow and Anton Kohler won), took 12th at Munich 1941 (Europaturnier Munich 1941 chess tournament, Gösta Stoltz won), tied for 10-12th in the 2nd GG-ch at Warsaw–Kraków 1941 (Alexander Alekhine and Paul Felix Schmidt won), and won in the Kraków Championship in 1941.

After the war, he lived in Berlin-Spandau, where he played in several tournaments. He took 7th in 1949 (Gerhard Pfeiffer won), tied for 3rd-5th in 1950 (Max Euwe won), took 6th in 1952 (Rudolf Teschner won), took 4th in 1953, tied for 3rd-4th in 1954, and tied for 12-13th in 1957.

Mross took 7th at Hoechst 1955 (FRG-ch, Klaus Darga won).

He moved to Erlangen in the 1960s.

== Notable chess games ==
- Peter Leepin vs Paul Mross, Munich 1941, Europaturnier, English Opening: Anglo-Indian Defense, Queen's Knight Variation, A16, 0-1
- Paul Mross vs Alexander Alekhine, Munich 1941, Europaturnier, Ruy Lopez: Steinitz Defense Deferred, C79, 1/2-1/2
- Paul Mross vs Carl Carls, Krakow-Warsaw 1941, GG-ch, Sicilian Defense: Dragon, B73, 1-0
