= Lora Yakovleva =

Russian chess player (1932–2022)

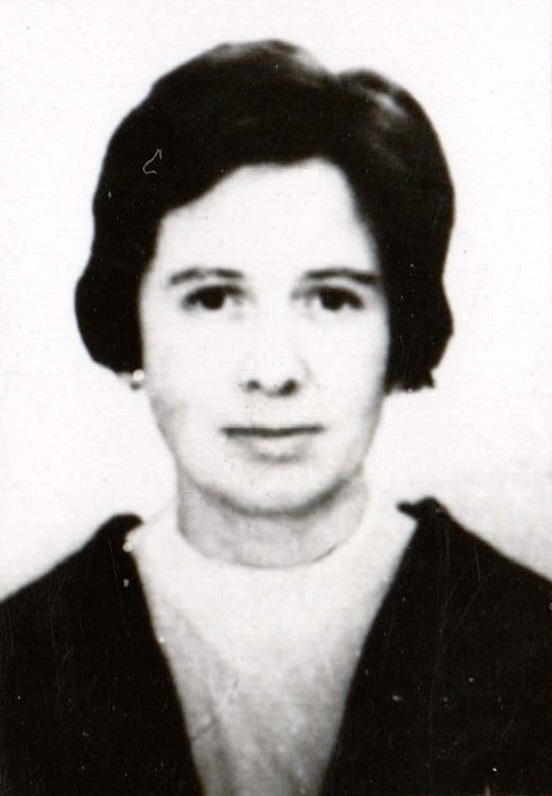

Personal information
- Born: Lora Grigoryevna Yakovleva; 21 April 1932 Perm, Soviet Union
- Died: 3 February 2022 (aged 89) Perm, Russia

Chess career
- Country: Russia
- Title: ICCF Lady Grandmaster (1997)
- ICCF World Champion: 1972–1977 (women)
- ICCF rating: 2294 (July 1997)
- ICCF peak rating: 2295 (July 1987)

Lora Grigoryevna Yakovleva (Russian: Лора Григорьевна Яковлева, also transliterated Jakovleva; 21 April 1932, Perm - 3 February 2022, Perm) was a Russian chess player who holds the ICCF title of Lady Grandmaster (LGM). She was the second ICCF Women's World Champion in correspondence chess between 1972 and 1977.

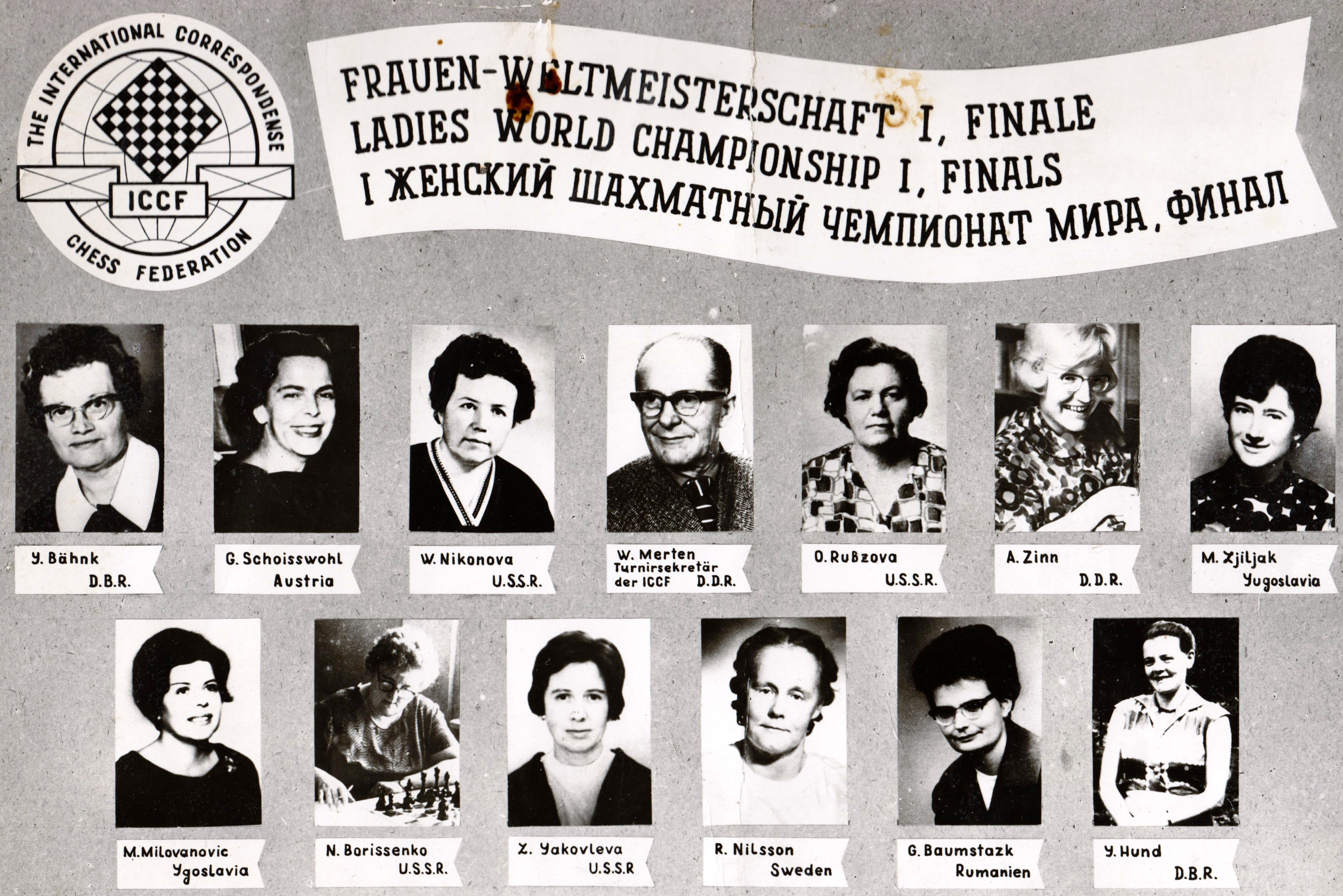
First ICCF Women's World Championship

Her husband is also a chess master.

Preceded by Olga Rubtsova	Ladies World Correspondence Chess Champion; 1972–1977	Succeeded by Ljuba Kristol
