= Olga Semenova Tyan-Shanskaya =

Soviet chess player (1911–1970)

Personal information
- Born: Olga Izmajlovna Semenova Tyan-Shanskaya; 9 September 1911 Saint Petersburg
- Died: 4 November 1970 (aged 59) Leningrad

Chess career
- Country: Soviet Union

Olga Izmajlovna Semenova Tyan-Shanskaya (Russian: Ольга Измайловна Семёнова-Тян-Шанская; 9 September 1911 – 4 November 1970) was a Soviet chess player.

She was born in Saint Petersburg, a niece of the Russian geographer Pyotr Semyonov-Tyan-Shansky. She learned to play chess at the age of 18; four years later she won the Leningrad city women's chess championship. She played in nine Women's Soviet Championships, winning two (1934 and 1936). In 1937 she took 2nd–3rd place, and in 1953 3rd–5th place.

She died in Leningrad.
