= Abram Szpiro =

Polish-Jewish chess player

Abram (Abraham) Szpiro (1912 in Stringenau, Russian Empire – 16 February 1943, in Auschwitz) was a Polish chess master.

Born in Russian Empire (now Poland), he moved with his family to Łódź. He tied for 7-8th (1930), shared 4th (1931), and twice took 6th (1933 and 1934) in Łódź City championships. He represented Łódź in the 2nd Polish Team Chess Championship at Katowice 1934. Szpiro won individual gold medal on fourth board, defeating Izak Schächter, Leon Tuhan-Baranowski, Henryk Friedman, etc., and team silver medal.

In 1934/35, he took 2nd in Poznań, and won at Poznań 1935. He tied for 2nd-5th at Łódź 1935, tied for 6-7th at Warsaw 1935 (the 3rd Polish Chess Championship won by Savielly Tartakower), won at Częstochowa 1936, tied for 7-8th at Jurata 1937 (international, the 4th POL-ch, Tartakower won), took 2nd (1937) and shared 4th (1939) in Łódź City championships.

During World War II, he lived in Łódź and Warsaw. He took 2nd, behind Henryk Pogorieły, at the Warsaw Ghetto tournament in February—April 1942. At the beginning of 1943, he was arrested in the Ghetto, transported to Nazi concentration camp and killed in Auschwitz.
