= Wolfgang Weil =

Austrian chess player

Wolfgang Weil (November 23, 1912, in Klosterneuburg – 1944/45, in Croatia) was an Austrian chess master.

Dr. Weil played for Austria at eighths board (+10 –2 =5) in 3rd unofficial Chess Olympiad at Munich 1936, and won individual gold medal.

He took 2nd, behind Paul Keres, at Vienna 1937 (Quadrangular), tied for 6–7th at Vienna 1937/38 (the 20th Trebitsch Memorial, Lajos Steiner won), took 9th at Bad Elster 1938 (Efim Bogoljubow won), tied for 15–16th at Bad Oeynhausen 1938 (the 5th German Championship, Erich Eliskases won), was a winner at Vienna (Schachklub Hietzing) 1939, took 3rd at Vienna 1939 (Eliskases won), and tied for 8–10th at Warsaw / Lublin / Kraków 1942 (the 3rd GG-ch, Alexander Alekhine won). He died in combat in Croatia.
