= Hans Roepstorff =

German chess player

Personal information
- Born: 1910
- Died: 1945 (aged 34–35)

Chess career
- Country: Germany
- Title: Master
- Years active: 1938–1944

Hans Roepstorff (Note: His surname also seen as "Röpstorff", and "Ropstorff") (1910–1945) was a German chess master.

Roepstorff took 15th at Kraków 1938 (Jaroslav Šajtar won), shared first with Paul Mross but lost to him a play-off at Berlin 1938, tied for 8–10th at Warsaw/Lublin/Kraków 1942 (the third General Government chess tournament, Alexander Alekhine won), took 10th at Vienna 1943 (the 10th German Chess Championship, Josef Lokvenc won), tied for 5–6th at Krynica 1943 (the fourth GG-ch, Lokvenc won), and took third at Radom 1944 (the fifth GG-ch, Efim Bogoljubow won).
