= Salzburg 1942 chess tournament =

Chess competition

The main organiser of Salzburg 1942, Ehrhardt Post, the Chief Executive of Nazi Grossdeutscher Schachbund, intended to bring together the six strongest players of Germany, the occupied and neutral European countries; world champion Alexander Alekhine, former champion Max Euwe, challenger Paul Keres, former challenger Efim Bogoljubov, winner of European tournament at Munich 1941 Gösta Stoltz, and German champion Paul Felix Schmidt. Euwe withdrew due to "illness". Actually, Euwe refused to participate because Alekhine was invited (Alekhine had written about the "Jewish clique" around Euwe in World Chess Championship 1935). His place was occupied by German sub-champion, the eighteen-years-old Klaus Junge. They made Salzburg 1942 the world's second, after a tournament purporting to be the first European Championship (Europameisterschaft) in Munich, strongest tournament in 1942.

The event took place in the rooms of Mirabell Palace in Salzburg from 9 to 18 June 1942. The players had to make 32 moves in two hours. Thereafter, the tempo became 16 moves per hour.

The final results and standings:

#	Player	Country	1	2	3	4	5	6	Total
1	Alexander Alekhine	Russia/France	xx	11	11	01	01	½ 1	7.5
2	Paul Keres	Estonia	00	xx	½½	1½	½1	11	6
3-4	Paul Felix Schmidt	Estonia/Germany	00	½½	xx	½½	01	11	5
3-4	Klaus Junge	Chile/Germany	10	0½	½½	xx	01	½1	5
5	Efim Bogoljubov	Ukraine/Germany	10	½0	10	10	xx	00	3.5
6	Gösta Stoltz	Sweden	½0	00	00	½0	11	xx	3
