= María Berea de Montero =

Argentine chess player

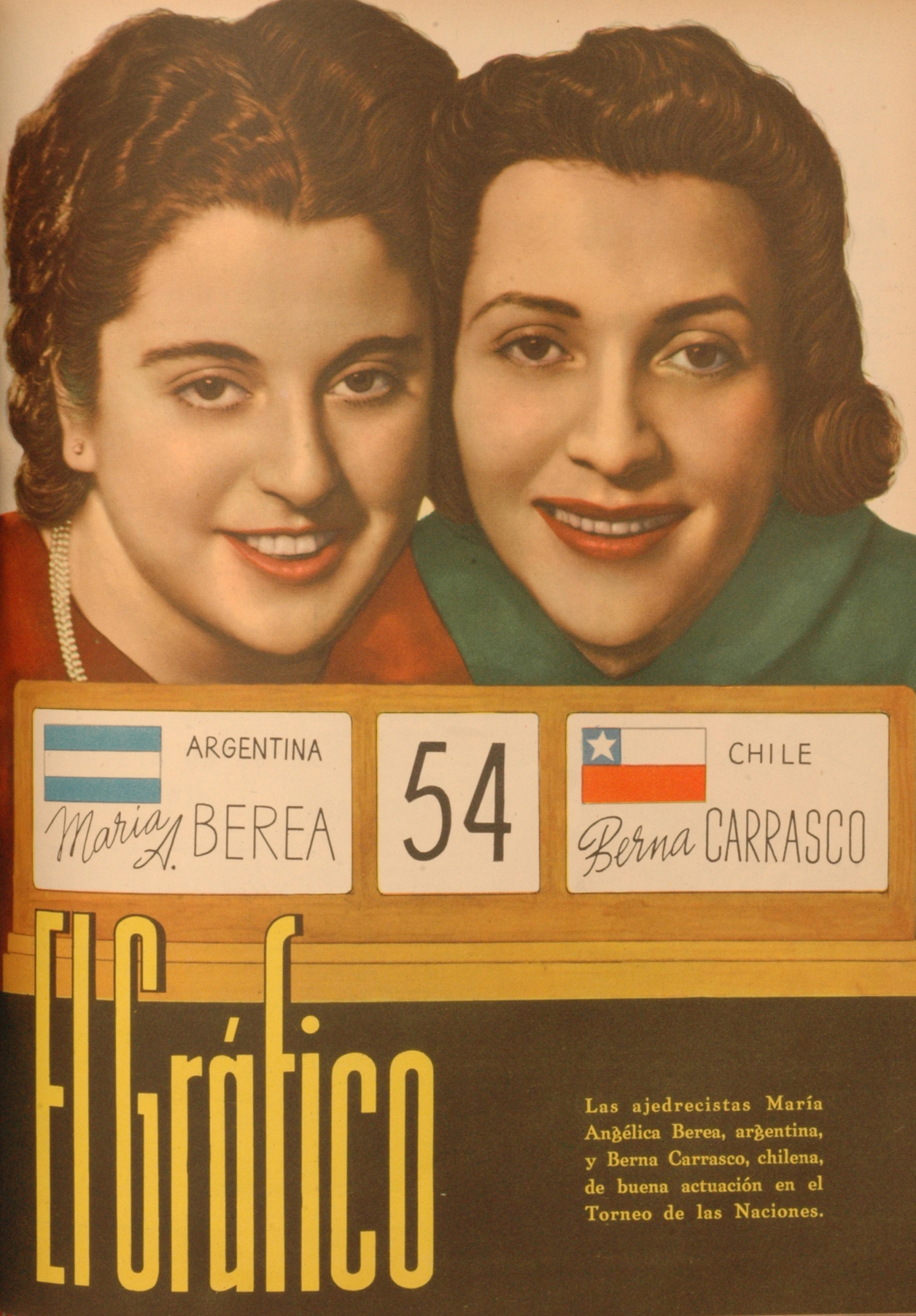
María A. Berea and Berna Carrasco, El Gráfico 1053

María Angélica Berea (13 April 1914, in Buenos Aires – 5 July 1983, in El Palomar, Buenos Aires) was an Argentine chess Woman International Master (WIM) and women's champion of Argentina in 1951.

With the married name of María Angélica Berea de Montero, she participated in the Women's World Chess Championship 1939 in Buenos Aires (15th).

She played in several national and South American tournaments, winning the Argentine title in 1951.

This let her play in the Candidates tournament of Moscow 1952 (penultimate place) and gave her the title of Woman International Master.

Later, divorced, she married the chessplayer Francisco Benkö.
