= Růžena Suchá =

Czech chess player (1907–1989)

Personal information
- Full name: Růžena Suchá–Dobiášová
- Born: 19 October 1907
- Died: 7 October 1989 (aged 81)

Chess career
- Country: Czechoslovakia
- Title: Woman International Master (1954)
- FIDE rating: 1890 (January 1977)

Růžena Suchá (19 October 1907 – 7 October 1989), also known as Růžena Suchá–Dobiášová, was a Czech chess player. She received the FIDE title of Woman International Master (WIM) in 1954 and was a three-time winner of the Czechoslovak Women's Chess Championship (1938, 1951, 1954).

== Biography ==
From the end of the 1930s to the early 1960s, Suchá was one of the leading Czechoslovak women's chess players. In 1943, she was the only woman who participated in Prague international chess tournament. The tournament was won by Alexander Alekhine, second was Paul Keres, but Suchá finished last with 3 draws out of 19 games. She won thirteen medals in the Czechoslovak women's chess championships: three golds (1938, 1951, 1954), three silver (1949, 1952, 1953) and seven bronze (1940, 1943, 1944, 1955, 1956, 1960, 1961).

In 1954, she shared 1st-2nd place in Women's World Chess Championship Zonal Tournament in Leipzig. In 1954, Růžena Suchá was awarded the FIDE Woman International Master (WIM) title. In 1955, she participated at Women's World Chess Championship Candidates Tournament in Moscow when ranked 19th place.

Also known as chess life organizer. In 1974, she was one of the founders of the chess club in Smíchov. After her death, her memorial tournaments are regularly held at this club.
