= Olga Rubtsova =

Soviet chess player (1909–1994)

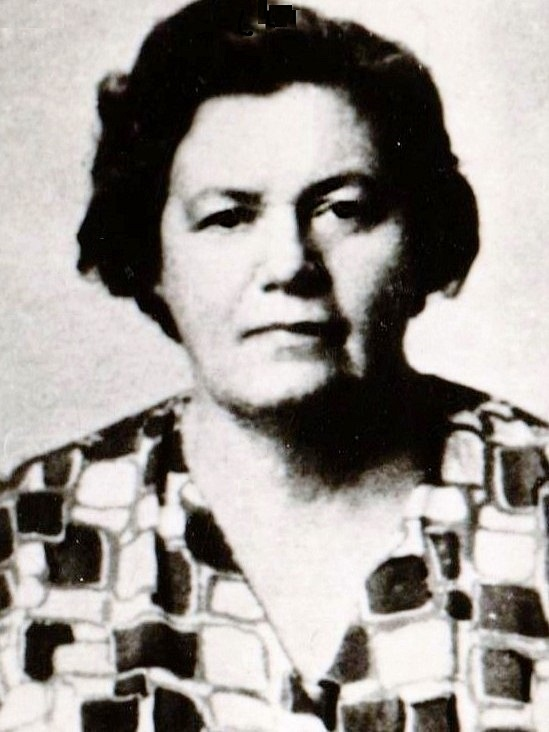

Personal information
- Born: Olga Nikolayevna Rubtsova; 20 August 1909 Moscow, Russian Empire
- Died: 13 December 1994 (aged 85) Moscow, Russia

Chess career
- Country: Soviet Union
- Title: FIDE International Master (1956); FIDE Woman Grandmaster (1976); ICCF Lady International Master (1975)
- Women's World Champion: 1956–1958
- ICCF World Champion: 1968–1972 (women)
- FIDE rating: 2065 (January 1990)
- ICCF rating: 2269 (July 1992)

Olga Nikolayevna Rubtsova (Russian: О́льга Никола́евна Рубцо́ва; 20 August 1909 – 13 December 1994) was a Soviet chess player and the fourth women's world chess champion. In 2015, she was inducted into the World Chess Hall of Fame.

== Career ==
Rubtsova won the Soviet Women's Championship four times (1927, 1931, 1937 and 1948). She was second in the Women's World Chess Championship 1949–50, a point behind Lyudmila Rudenko. She won the title in 1956, finishing ahead of Rudenko and Elisaveta Bykova in a tournament. Rubtsova lost it to Bykova in a match in 1958.

Rubtsova at the First women's Olympiad, Emmen 1957

In 1957, Rubtsova took part in the inaugural Women's Chess Olympiad in Emmen, the Netherlands, as a member of the USSR team, along with Kira Zvorykina. Soviet Union won the gold medal.

FIDE awarded her the titles of Woman International Master (WIM) in 1950, International Master (IM) in 1956, and Woman Grandmaster (WGM) in 1976. In 1952 she was awarded the title of Honoured Master of Sport of the URSS.

Rubtsova also played correspondence chess, and became the first women's world correspondence chess champion in 1972. She finished second in the next championship, only losing the title to Lora Yakovleva on tie-break, and fifth in the one after that. As of today, she remains the only player, male or female, to become world champion in both over-the-board and correspondence chess.

== Personal life ==
Rubtsova graduated from the Bauman Moscow State Technical University. She was also awarded the Order of the Red Banner of Labour. Her first husband was chess master Isaak Mazel 2nd (Also a chess master) Abram Polyak. Their daughter Elena Fatalibekova is Women's Chess Grandmaster.

Preceded by Elisaveta Bykova	Women's World Chess Champion; 1956–1958	Succeeded by Elisaveta Bykova
Preceded by none	Ladies World Correspondence Chess Champion; 1968–1972	Succeeded by Lora Jakovleva
