= Nina Hrušková-Bělská =

Czech chess player (1925–2015)

Personal information
- Born: 5 May 1925 Novocherkassk, Russian SFSR, Soviet Union
- Died: 30 November 2015 (aged 90) Prague, Czech Republic

Chess career
- Country: Czechoslovakia; Czech Republic
- Title: Woman International Master (1950)

Nina Hrušková-Bělská (5 May 1925 – 30 November 2015) was a Czech chess player who held the FIDE title of Woman International Master (WIM, 1950). She was a five-time winner of the Czechoslovak Women's Chess Championship (1946, 1948, 1952, 1953, 1956).

== Biography ==
From the end of the 1940s to the end of the 1950s, Hrušková-Bělská was one of the leading Czechoslovak women's chess players. She twice won Protectorate of Bohemia and Moravia women's chess championships (1943, 1944). She won the Czechoslovak women's chess championships five times: 1946, 1948, 1952, 1953 and 1956. In 1950, Hrušková-Bělská participated at Women's World Chess Championship in Moscow where shared 12th-14th place. In 1952, she participated at Women's World Chess Championship Candidates Tournament in Moscow where ranked 13th place.

Hrušková-Bělská played for Czechoslovakia in the Women's Chess Olympiad:

- In 1957, at first board in the 1st Chess Olympiad (women) in Emmen (+5, =1, -5).

In 1950, she was awarded the FIDE Woman International Master (WIM) title. In 1956, she was awarded FIDE International Arbiter (IA) title. Hrušková-Bělská was the chief arbiter for the Women's World Chess Championships in 1962, 1965, 1969, and for the Women's World Chess Championship Candidates Tournament in 1955.
