= USSR Women's Chess Championship =

Chess Championship

The Women's Soviet Chess Championship was played in the Soviet Union from 1927 through 1991 to determine the women's chess national champion.

The championship was not played on a regular basis in the years 1927–1937 and there was a break during World War II. From 1950 onward it was played regularly all years.

== List of winners ==
#	Year	Place	Winner	Score
1	1927	Moscow	Olga Rubtsova	8½ / 10
2	1931	Moscow	Olga Rubtsova	7½ / 9
3	1934	Leningrad	Olga Semenova Tyan-Shanskaya	7 / 9
4	1936	Leningrad	Olga Semenova Tyan-Shanskaya	9½ / 11
5	1937	Rostov-on-Don	Olga Rubtsova	12½ / 15
6	1945	Moscow	Valentina Borisenko	7½ / 9
7	1946	Moscow	Elisaveta Bykova	14 / 16
8	1947	Moscow	Elisaveta Bykova	12 / 15
9	1948	Moscow	Olga Rubtsova	13 / 17
10	1950	Riga	Elisaveta Bykova	12½ / 15
11	1951	Kiev	Kira Zvorykina	11½ / 17
12	1952	Tbilisi	Lyudmila Rudenko	13 / 17
13	1953	Rostov-on-Don	Kira Zvorykina	13 / 17
14	1954	Krasnodar	Larissa Volpert	14 / 19
15	1955	Sukhumi	Valentina Borisenko	13½ / 19
16	1956	Dnepropetrovsk	Kira Zvorykina	13½ / 17
17	1957	Vilnius	Valentina Borisenko	12 / 17
18	1958	Kharkov	Larissa Volpert	14 / 21
19	1959	Lipetsk	Larissa Volpert	12 / 18
20	1960	Riga	Valentina Borisenko	13 / 18
21	1961	Baku	Valentina Borisenko	13½ / 19
22	1962	Riga	Tatiana Zatulovskaya	13 / 19
23	1963	Baku	Maaja Ranniku	14 / 19
24	1964	Tbilisi	Nona Gaprindashvili	15 / 19
25	1965	Beltsy	Valentina Kozlovskaya	13½ / 19
26	1966	Kiev	Nana Alexandria	14 / 19
27	1967	Sochi	Maaja Ranniku	11 / 13
28	1968	Ashkhabad	Nana Alexandria	13½ / 19
29	1969	Gori	Nana Alexandria	15 / 19
30	1970	Beltsy	Alla Kushnir	14 / 19
31	1971	Sochi	Irina Levitina	14 / 19
32	1972	Tolyatti	Marta Litinskaya	12 / 19
33	1973	Tbilisi	Nona Gaprindashvili	14 / 19
34	1974	Tbilisi	Elena Fatalibekova	14 / 18
35	1975	Frunze	Liudmila Belavenets	10 / 16
36	1976	Tbilisi	Anna Akhsharumova	12½ / 17
37	1977	Lvov	Maia Chiburdanidze	13 / 17
38	1978	Nikolayevsk	Lidia Semenova	12½ / 17
39	1979	Tbilisi	Irina Levitina	12½ / 17
40	1980	Alma-Ata	Irina Levitina	12 / 15
41	1981	Ivano-Frankivsk	Nona Gaprindashvili; Nana Ioseliani	12 / 17
42	1982	Tallinn	Nana Ioseliani	12 / 17
43	1983	Vilnius	Nona Gaprindashvili	12½ / 17
44	1984	Kiev	Svetlana Matveeva; Anna Akhsharumova	9½ / 15
45	1985	Yerevan	Nona Gaprindashvili	12½ / 17
46	1986	Frunze	Nana Ioseliani	11½ / 16
47	1987	Tbilisi	Nana Ioseliani	14½ / 19
48	1988	Alma-Ata	Julia Demina	12 / 17
49	1989	Volzhsky	Irina Chelushkina	12½ / 17
50	1990	Podolsk	Ketevan Arakhamia-Grant	13 / 16
51	1991	Lvov	Svetlana Matveeva	13½ / 17

Winners of more titles

- 5 titles : Valentina Borisenko, Nona Gaprindashvili
- 4 titles : Olga Rubtsova, Nana Ioseliani
- 3 titles : Nana Alexandria, Elisaveta Bykova, Irina Levitina, Larissa Volpert, Kira Zvorykina
- 2 titles : Anna Akhsharumova, Svetlana Matveeva, Maaja Ranniku, Olga Semenova Tyan-Shanskaya

== Related pages ==
- Soviet Chess Championship
