= Anton Kohler =

German chess player

Anton Kohler (c. 1907 – 7 September 1961) was a German chess player from Munich.

In 1937 he shared 3rd in Stadtprozelten / Main, and took 12th in Bad Oeynhausen (4th GER-ch, Georg Kieninger won). In 1938 he won in Heilbronn, and tied for 8–9th in Bad Oeynhausen (5th GER-ch, Erich Eliskases won). In 1938/39 he tied for 1st–3rd in Karlsruhe. In 1939, he tied for 4–5th in Bad Oeynhausen (6th GER-ch, Eliskases won). In 1940 he took 5th in Bad Oeynhausen (7th GER-ch, Kieninger won), and shared 1st with Efim Bogoljubow at Kraków / Krynica / Warsaw (1st GG-ch).

After World War II he won at Passau 1952 (Bavarian championship); and took 27th at Leipzig 1953 (GER-ch, Wolfgang Unzicker won).
