= Valentina Borisenko =

Soviet chess player

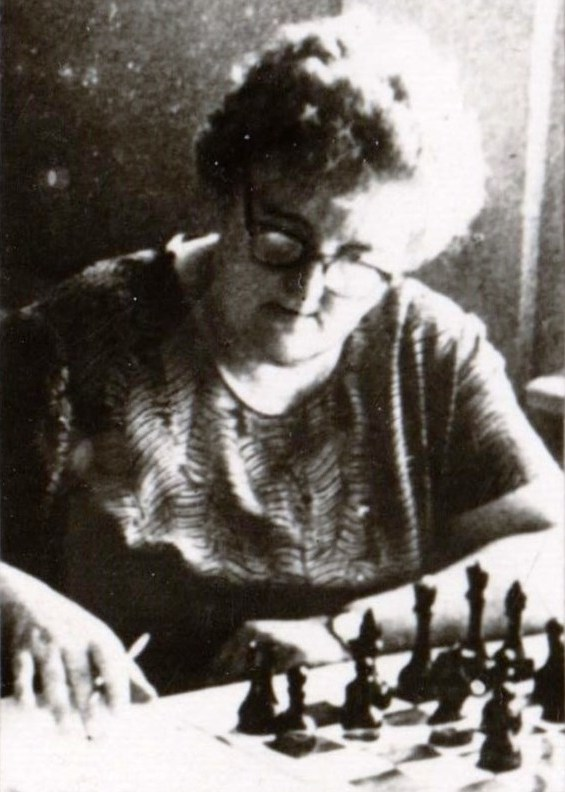

Personal information
- Born: Valentina Mikhaylovna Borisenko; 28 January 1920 Cherepovets
- Died: 6 March 1993 (aged 73) Saint Petersburg

Chess career
- Country: Soviet Union
- Title: Honorary Woman Grandmaster
- Peak rating: 2255 (January 1990)

Valentina Mikhaylovna Borisenko (née Belova; Russian: Валентина Михайловна Борисенко; Cherepovets, 28 January 1920 – Saint Petersburg, 6 March 1993) was a Soviet chess player.

She was a five-time winner of the Women's Soviet Championship: 1945, 1955, 1957, 1960, and 1961 (a record shared with Nona Gaprindashvili).

She won the Leningrad women's chess championship seven times (1940, 1945, 1950, 1951, 1954, 1955, and 1956), and four times the RSFSR women's championship.

In the Women's World Chess Championship 1949–50 she tied for 3rd–4th with Elisaveta Bykova.

In 1970 she was equal first with Waltraud Nowarra in the international tournament at Halle.

In 1977 she was awarded by FIDE the Honorary title of Woman Grandmaster for her results in the years 1945-1970.

Her husband was Russian correspondence chess player Georgy Borisenko, who also trained her to play chess. Their son is also a chess player and holds a Candidate Master title.
