= Kira Zvorykina =

Soviet chess player (1919–2014)

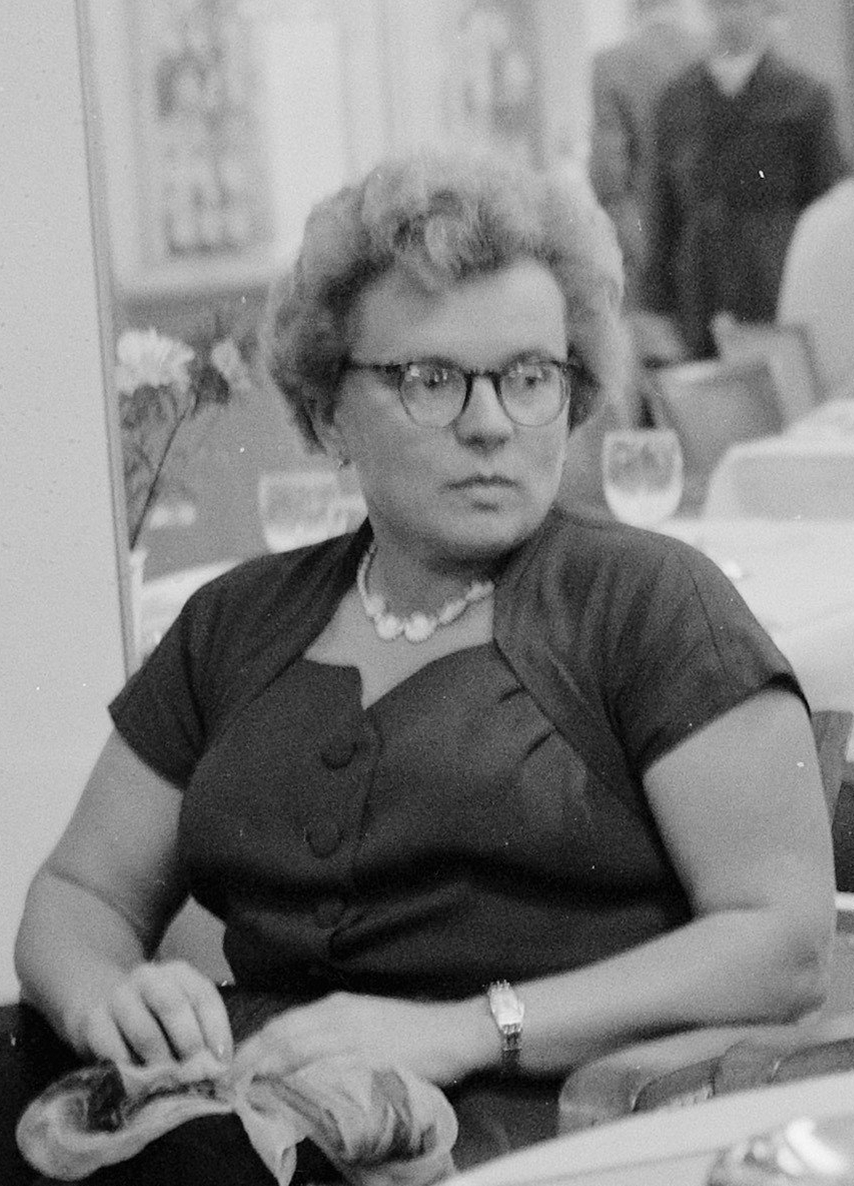
- Zvorykina in 1957, at the 1st Women's Chess Olympiad

Personal information
- Born: September 29, 1919 Mykolaiv, Ukrainian SSR, Soviet Union
- Died: September 6, 2014 (aged 94) Moscow, Russia

Chess career
- Country: Soviet Union
- Title: Woman Grandmaster (1978)
- Peak rating: 2295 (January 1990)

Kira Alekseyevna Zvorykina (Russian: Ки́ра Алексе́евна Зворы́кина, Ukrainian: Кіра Олексіївна Зварикіна; September 29, 1919 – September 6, 2014) was a Soviet chess player who spent many years living in Belarus. She was a three-time winner of the Women's Soviet Championship. In 2018, she was inducted into the World Chess Hall of Fame.

== Formative years ==
Her parents were Aleksey Konstantinovich Zvorykin (brother of Vladimir Zworykin) and Lidiya Terpugova and she was one of seven children. Her immediate and extended family were, in her youth, keen chess players and even held their own private chess tournaments. Buoyed from her success in one of these contests at the age of 16, she entered a school competition and won all of her games.

By 1927 the family had resettled in Leningrad (today, Saint Petersburg). Consequently, the opportunity arose for the young Zvorykina to join the legendary Palace of Young Pioneers' Chess Club where classes were given by rising star Peter Romanovsky, then a Candidate Master. At 17 she became the Leningrad Schoolgirl Champion and also began studying at the Institute of Cinematography. Her time for chess gradually became more limited and it was not until 1946 that she began to emerge as an important force in world chess, finishing second in the Leningrad Women's Championship.

== Championship chess ==
Zvorykina married grandmaster and chess trainer Alexey Suetin and together they had a son, Aleksandr, who was born in 1951. Further progress brought Zvorykina up to the pinnacle of Russian Women's chess, as she went on to win the national women's championship outright in 1951, 1953 and 1956. There were also two equal first finishes in 1957 (she lost the tiebreak with Valentina Borisenko) and in 1958 (with Larissa Volpert).

In international chess, there were very few women's tournaments held in the 1950s when Zvorykina was at her peak, but she tied for fourth place at the 1952 Moscow event and beat Anne Sunnucks (+1 =1 −0) in the USSR versus Great Britain Match of 1954. Her greatest success occurred in Plovdiv at the Women's Candidates Tournament of 1959, when victory over a strong field earned her a match with reigning Women's World Champion Elizaveta Bykova for the title. The 1960 match coincided with her mother's terminal illness and this undoubtedly affected her play, resulting in a loss by a 4½–8½ margin.

In the 1960s, she competed in only a small number of international tournaments without much success; a new wave of strong players were by then in the ascendancy, most notably the Azerbaijani, Tatiana Zatulovskaya and the Georgians, Nona Gaprindashvili and Nana Alexandria. In World Championship Candidates tournaments however, she remained a consistent and respected performer throughout the 1950s and well into the 1960s, never achieving less than a top 5 finish.

== Team chess ==
Zvorykina (middle, Emmen, 1957)

Representing the Soviet Union at the Women's Chess Olympiads of 1957 (Emmen) and 1963 (Split), Zvorykina produced two sparkling, medal-winning performances. The first resulted in a board 2 score of 12/14, securing both individual and team gold and even overshadowing the accomplishment of board 1 compatriot Olga Rubtsova, the World Champion. Her second appearance saw her post a similarly impressive 5½/6 score, helping the team to another gold medal. However, as this was achieved from the position of team reserve, no individual medal was awarded.

== Later career ==
Zvorykina spent some time in Moscow, when her husband was appointed Head Coach there; later, she lived in Minsk, where she ran a chess school, although her career had previously been in engineering. A frequent competitor in the Belarusian Chess Championship, she was champion on three occasions; in 1960, 1973 and 1975.

Latterly, her FIDE registration was through the Russian Federation, although she had spent some time living in Bulgaria. Despite advancing years, she played chess in rated tournaments until 2007; in 1998, close to her eightieth birthday, her Elo rating was still an imposing 2245 and at the World Seniors at Rowy in 2000, she achieved a mid-table finish. Even later, her schedule included the European Senior Women's Championship and the Russian Senior Women's Championship.

Zvorykina's Woman International Master title was awarded in 1952 and her Woman Grandmaster title in 1977. She also became an International Arbiter in 1977. She died at the age of 94 in 2014.
