= Larissa Volpert =

Woman chess grandmaster and philologist

Larissa Ilinichna Volpert (Russian: Лариса Ильинична Вольперт; 30 March 1926 – 1 October 2017) was a Soviet chess Woman Grandmaster and Russian and Estonian philologist. She was a three-time Soviet women's chess champion (1954, 1958, and 1959).

Born in Leningrad, she learned chess from her older brother and received chess instruction at the Leningrad Pioneers Palace. In 1947, she tied for first at the Leningrad Women's Championship. She played her first USSR Women's Championship in 1949 and finished equal fifth. In 1954, she won her first USSR Women's Championship. She scored 2–0 against Nina Hrušková-Bělská in the 1954 USSR v. Czechoslovakia match. In 1958 she shared the USSR Women's Championship title, and in 1959 she won for the third time, her second outright victory.

Volpert earned the Woman International Master title in 1954 and the Woman Grandmaster title in 1978. She had a degree in philology from Leningrad University and since 1977 taught Russian philology at the University of Tartu, Estonia. Her major works are about Pushkin's and Lermontov's poetry, especially in their connections to French literature. She died at the age of 91 on 1 October 2017.
