= Paul Felix Schmidt =

Estonian chess player and chemist (1916–1984)

Personal information
- Born: 20 August 1916 Narva, Russian Empire (now Estonia)
- Died: 11 August 1984 (aged 67) Allentown, Pennsylvania, U.S.

Chess career
- Country: Estonia (until 1939); Nazi Germany (1939–1945); Germany (1945–1949); West Germany (1949–1953); United States
- Title: International Master (1950)

Paul Felix Schmidt (20 August [O.S. 7 August] 1916 – 11 August 1984) was an Estonian and German chess player, writer and chemist.

== Biography ==
Schmidt was born in 1916, in Narva (then Russian Empire), two years before Estonia became an independent country. He excelled in chess from an early age. In June 1935, Schmidt won, ahead of Paul Keres, at a nationwide tournament in Tallinn. In May 1936, he drew a match against Keres (+3 –3 =1) at Pärnu. In 1936, he won the 8th Estonian Championship at Tallinn. In December 1936, he placed 2nd, behind Keres, at Tallinn. In July 1937, he won Estonia's first-ever international tournament at Pärnu, ahead of two world title contenders, Salo Flohr and Keres, as well as Gideon Ståhlberg. In 1937, he won at Tallinn (9th EST–ch).

In August 1937, he played for Estonia (2nd board) at the 7th Chess Olympiad in Stockholm (+4 –4 =8). In June 1938, he tied for 8th-10th at Noordwijk. The event was won by Erich Eliskases. In August–September 1939, he played for Estonia (3rd board) at the 8th Chess Olympiad at Buenos Aires (+2 –5 =6). Estonia took 3rd place, behind Germany and Poland.

Schmidt emigrated from Estonia to Germany in the autumn of 1939. In August 1940, he took 2nd, behind Georg Kieninger, at the 7th German Championship, held in Bad Oeynhausen. In August 1941, he tied for 1st with Klaus Junge at Bad Oeynhausen (8th GER–ch). In 1941, he won a play-off match for the German championship against Junge (+3 –0 =1) at Bromberg. In October 1941, he tied for 1st with Alexander Alekhine at Kraków/Warsaw (the 2nd General Government chess tournament). In June 1942, he tied for 3rd-4th with Junge, behind Alekhine and Keres, at Salzburg. In June 1943, he took 3rd, behind Keres and Alekhine, at Salzburg. In August 1943, he took 2nd, behind Josef Lokvenc, at Vienna (10th GER–ch).

After World War II, in May 1946, he tied for 2nd-3rd with Carl Ahues, behind Wilfried Lange, at Hamburg. In May 1947, he took 2nd, behind Efim Bogoljubov at Kassel. In 1949, he tied for 3rd-5th at Heidelberg. The event was won by Wolfgang Unzicker.

In 1949, he published the book Schachmeister denken (Dietmannsriel-Allgau 1949). In 1950, he was awarded the title of International Master by FIDE. In 1951, he earned a PhD in chemistry from Heidelberg University, and moved to Canada, then to the United States, settling in Philadelphia, where he took a job as a professor.

After this, he and his wife Eva moved to Bell Telephone Laboratories, Allentown, Pennsylvania, where he made contributions to electrochemistry and anodic oxidation of silicon, was expert in neutron activation analysis, and published many papers, till his retirement in 1982. He continued playing occasional games of chess, regularly visiting Reuben Fine in New York.

== Notable chess games ==
- Paul Felix Schmidt vs Paul Keres, Pärnu 1937, Queen's Gambit Declined, D06, 1-0
- Paul Felix Schmidt vs Klaus Junge, Bad Oeynhausen 1941, 8th GER-ch, Queen's Gambit Declined Semi-Slav, Meran Variation, D49, 1-0
- Paul Felix Schmidt vs Teodor Regedzinski, Krakow/Warsaw 1941, Caro-Kann Defense, Two Knights Attack, B10, 1-0
- Paul Felix Schmidt vs Gösta Stoltz, Salzburg 1942, Sicilian Defense, Najdorf, Opocensky Variation, B92, 1-0
- Efim Bogoljubow vs Paul Felix Schmidt, Salzburg 1943, Queen's Gambit Declined, Semi-Slav, Meran Variation, D49, 0-1
