= Friedrich Sämisch =

German chess grandmaster (1896–1975)

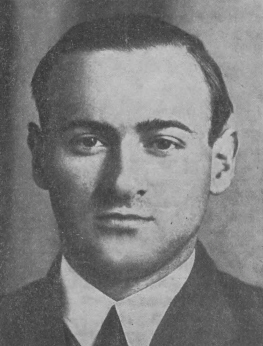

Personal information
- Born: 20 September 1896 Charlottenburg, German Empire
- Died: 16 August 1975 (aged 78) Berlin, West Germany

Chess career
- Country: Germany
- Title: Grandmaster (1950)

Friedrich Sämisch (20 September 1896 – 16 August 1975) was a German chess player and chess theorist. He was among the inaugural recipients of the title International Grandmaster from FIDE in 1950.

== Background ==
Sämisch was a bookbinder before taking up chess full-time. As a player, he had a reputation for getting into time trouble though somewhat inconsistently he was a fine player of lightning chess. He was also said to be a fine player of blindfold chess, with world champion Alexander Alekhine observing: 'Of all the modern masters that I have had occasion to observe playing blindfold chess, it is Sämisch who interests me the most; his great technique, his speed and precision have always made a profound impression on me'.

== Main competitive results ==
- 2nd at Berlin 1920
- 1st at Vienna, Austria in 1921 (champion of the first, although unofficial, Austrian Chess Championship), above Max Euwe, Gyula Breyer, Ernst Grünfeld and Savielly Tartakower
- 2nd at Hamburg 1921
- equal 2nd with Tartakower, after Aron Nimzowitsch, at Copenhagen 1923
- 3rd at Baden-Baden 1925, after Alexander Alekhine and Akiba Rubinstein
- equal 1st with Sir George Thomas at Spa, Belgium, 1926
- 1st at Dortmund 1928, above Richard Réti, Paul Johner and Efim Bogoljubov
- equal 1st with Réti at Brno 1928
- 1st at Swinemünde 1930

In 1922 he won a match in Berlin against Réti (+4−1=3).

Perhaps his most famous game is his loss to Nimzowitsch at Copenhagen 1923 in the Immortal Zugzwang Game. He also played many beautiful games though, one of them being his win against Grünfeld at Karlsbad 1929, which won a brilliancy prize. In the same tournament he also won against José Raúl Capablanca. The former world champion lost a piece in the opening but did not resign, which usually happens in such cases in grandmaster games, but to no avail, this disadvantage being too much even for a player of his class.

At the age of 73, in 1969, Sämisch played a tournament in memoriam of Adolf Anderssen in Büsum, Germany, and another tournament in Linköping, Sweden, but lost all games in both events (fifteen in the former and thirteen in the latter) on time control.

== Contributions to opening theory ==
Sämisch is today remembered primarily for his contributions to opening theory. Four major opening lines are named after him:

- a variation of the King's Indian Defense: 1.d4 Nf6 2.c4 g6 3.Nc3 Bg7 4.e4 d6 5.f3
- a variation of the Nimzo-Indian Defense: 1.d4 Nf6 2.c4 e6 3.Nc3 Bb4 4.a3
- a variation of the Queen's Indian Defence: 1.d4 Nf6 2.c4 e6 3.Nf3 b6 4.g3 Bb7 5.Bg2 c5
- a variation of the Alekhine's Defence: 1. e4 Nf6 2. e5 Nd5 3. Nc3
