= Lyudmila Rudenko =

Soviet chess player (1904–1986)

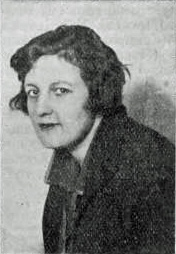
- Lyudmila Rudenko c. 1928

Personal information
- Born: Lyudmila Vladimirovna Rudenko; 27 July 1904 Lubny, Poltava Governorate, Russian Empire (present-day Ukraine)
- Died: 4 March 1986 (aged 81) Leningrad, Soviet Union

Chess career
- Country: Soviet Union
- Title: International Master (1950); Woman Grandmaster (1976)
- Women's World Champion: 1950–1953

Lyudmila Vladimirovna Rudenko (Russian: Людми́ла Влади́мировна Руде́нко, Ukrainian: Людмила Володимирівна Руденко; 27 July 1904 – 4 March 1986) was a Soviet and Ukrainian chess player and the second women's world chess champion, from 1950 until 1953.

Rudenko was awarded the FIDE titles of International Master (IM) and Woman International Master (WIM) in 1950, and Woman Grandmaster (WGM) in 1976. She was the first woman awarded the International Master title. She was also USSR women's champion in 1952.

== Early life and swimming career ==
Rudenko was born in 1904 in Lubny, in the Poltava region of what is now Ukraine. At age 10, she was taught how to play chess by her father—although, at first, she was more interested in swimming. After secondary school, she moved to Odessa and took a degree in economics. Rudenko became the swimming champion of Odessa in the 400-metre (1,300 ft) breaststroke. In 1925, she was swimming vice-champion of Ukraine (breaststroke). She started a career as an economic planner for the Soviet Union, and chess became a hobby.

== Chess career ==
Rudenko began playing tournament chess in 1925 after a move to Moscow. In 1928, she won the Moscow women's championship. She then moved to Leningrad, where she met and married scientist Lev Davidovich Goldstein; in 1931 they had a son. In Leningrad in 1929 she began training with chess master Peter Romanovsky. She won the Leningrad women's championship three times.

In World War II, Rudenko organized a train to evacuate children from the Siege of Leningrad. She described this as the most important accomplishment in her life.

Women's World Champion Vera Menchik died in 1944 during an air raid. After the war, in the winter of 1949–1950, the World Chess Federation FIDE held a tournament in Moscow to determine the new women's champion. Sixteen women from twelve countries competed, with the four Soviet players taking the top four spots. Rudenko, who was then 45 years old, won the tournament, a full point ahead of the field (scoring nine wins, one loss, and five draws). She held the Women's World Championship title until losing it to Elisaveta Bykova in 1953 in the next championship cycle. Her score was 6–8 (five wins, seven losses, and two draws).

Rudenko's post-war chess trainers were Alexander Tolush and Grigory Levenfish.

== Legacy ==
Rudenko was inducted into the World Chess Hall of Fame in 2015. She was honored with a Google Doodle on the 114th anniversary of her birth, 27 July 2018.

Preceded by Vera Menchik, then vacant (no champion from 1944 to 1950)	Women's World Chess Champion; 1950–1953	Succeeded by Elisaveta Bykova
