= Klaus Junge =

German chess player (1924–1945)

- Klaus Junge, 1942, wearing the uniform of the Reichsarbeitsdienst with the swastika armband as a part of the uniform

Personal information
- Born: 1 January 1924 Concepción, Chile
- Died: 17 April 1945 (aged 21) Welle, Germany

Chess career
- Country: Germany

Klaus Junge (1 January 1924 – 17 April 1945) was a Chilean-German chess master who was among the world's leading players during World War II. An officer in the Wehrmacht, he died during the Battle of Welle shortly before the end of the war.

== Biography ==
Junge was born into a German Chilean family. His father Otto was a strong chess player who won the Chilean Chess Championship in 1922. In 1928 his parents and their five sons (four of whom would die in World War II) returned to Germany.

On 11–20 August 1939, he, along with Wolfgang Unzicker (14 years old), Edith Keller (17), Rudolf Kunath (15) and Karl Krbavic (17), played in Fürstenwalde (Jugendschachwoche) near Berlin. In 1941, at the age of 17, Klaus Junge was considered one of the strongest players in Germany. In 1941, he won the championship of Hamburg. In May 1941, he won at Bad Elster (qualifying German championship). In August 1941, he tied for first with Paul Felix Schmidt at Bad Oeynhausen (the eighth German Championship), although he lost a playoff match against Schmidt for the title at Bromberg (+0 –3 =1). In October 1941, he took fourth place, behind Alexander Alekhine, Schmidt, and Efim Bogoljubow, at Kraków/Warsaw (the second General Government chess tournament championship).

In January 1942, Junge won the Dresden tournament. In 1942, he took second place, behind Walter Niephaus, at Leipzig. In April 1942, he was second, behind Carl Carls, at Rostock. In June 1942, he tied for third–fourth with Schmidt, behind Alekhine and Paul Keres, at the Salzburg 1942 chess tournament. In September, he took seventh place at the Munich (the first European Championship), won by Alekhine. In October 1942, he took second place, behind Alekhine, at Warsaw/Lublin/Kraków (the third General Government championship). In December 1942, he tied for first with Alekhine at Prague (Duras Jubileé, 60-jähriges Jubiläum). In 1942–43, he played in three correspondence tournaments, beating among others Rudolf Teschner and Emil Joseph Diemer.

World War II cut Junge's chess career short. Klaus Junge, whose father had been a member of the Nazi Party since 1932, was an adherent of the National Socialist ideology. As a lieutenant of the Wehrmacht, he died in combat against Allied troops on 17 April 1945 in the Battle of Welle on the Lüneburg Heath, close to Hamburg, three weeks before World War II ended.

In 1946, Regensburg hosted the first Klaus Junge Memorial. The event was won by Fedor Bohatirchuk, ahead of Elmārs Zemgalis, Wolfgang Unzicker, etc.

== Notable games ==
World Champion Alekhine (age 49) vs. Klaus Junge (age 18), Salzburg 1942

Position: g1 white king, c1 white rook, a1 black rook, h2 white pawn, g2 white pawn, f3 white pawn, e3 white queen, e4 white knight, b4 white pawn, e5 black queen, c5 white knight, b5 white pawn, f6 black bishop, h7 black pawn, g7 black pawn, f7 black pawn, g8 black king, f8 black rook

Position after 33 moves

Position: h3 white king, f3 black king, g4 white pawn, h5 white knight, g5 black pawn, h6 white pawn, f6 black pawn, b6 black rook, h7 black pawn

Final position after 69 moves, White resigned

- Kurt Richter vs Klaus Junge, Bad Oeynhausen 1941, GER-ch, Trompowsky Attack, A45, 0–1
- Klaus Junge vs Paul Mross, Krakow 1941, Nimzo-Indian, Rubinstein Variation, E47, 1–0
- Alexander Alekhine vs Klaus Junge, Salzburg 1942, Semi-Slav Defense, Marshall Gambit, D31, 0–1
- Klaus Junge vs Čeněk Kottnauer, Prague 1942, Queen's Gambit Declined Semi-Slav, D46, 1–0
- Klaus Junge vs Emil Josef Diemer, XVII.corr. tournament 1942–43, King's Gambit Accepted, C34, 1–0
- Klaus Junge vs Walter Sahlmann, Hamburg 1944, Sicilian, Scheveningen Variation, B84, 1–0
