= Rudolf Teschner =

German chess grandmaster and writer (1922–2006

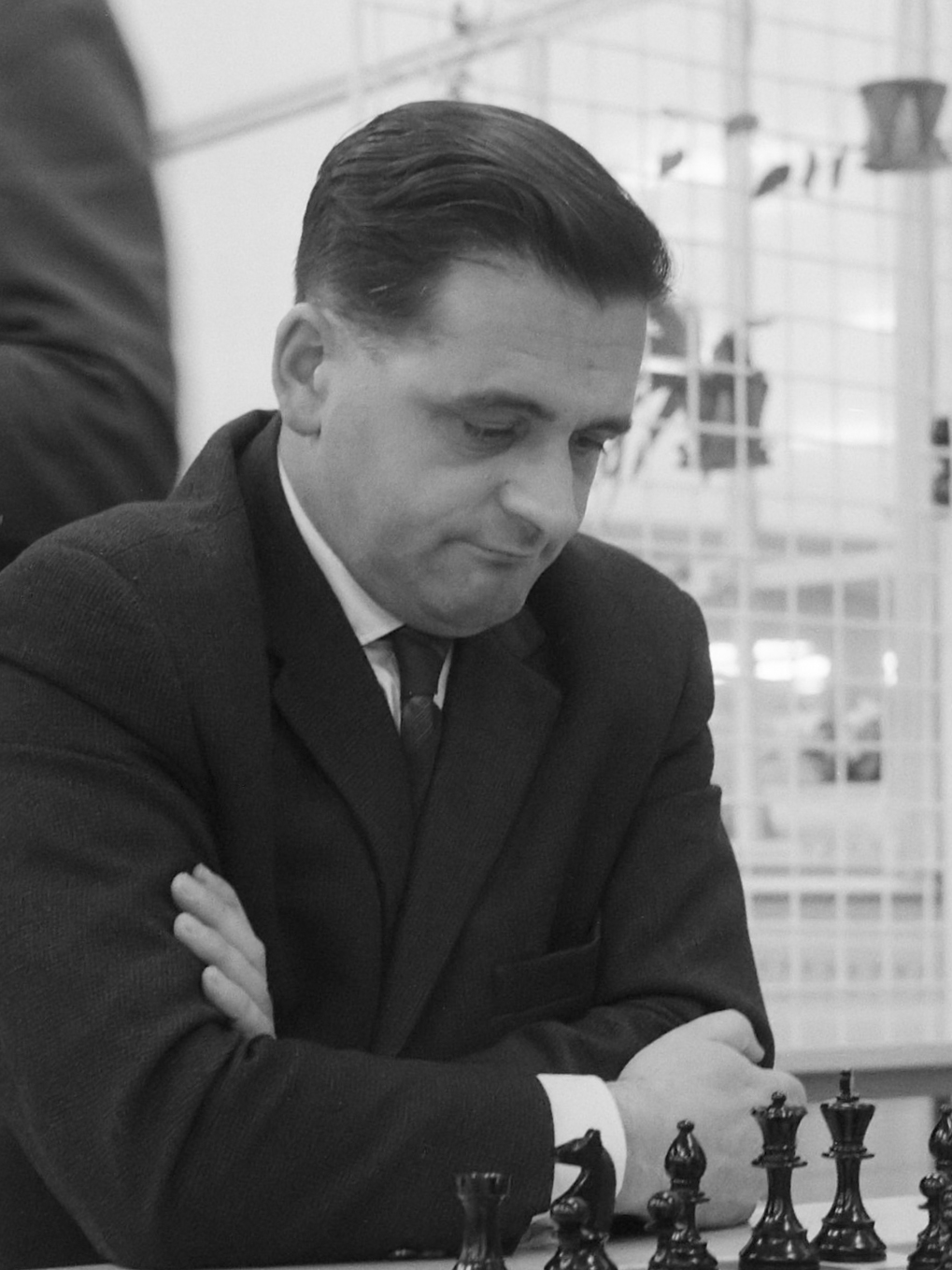
- Teschner in 1960

Personal information
- Born: 16 February 1922 Potsdam, Prussia, Germany
- Died: 23 July 2006 (aged 84) Berlin, Germany

Chess career
- Country: Germany
- Title: Grandmaster (1992)
- Peak rating: 2,450 (July 1971)

Rudolf Teschner (16 February 1922 – 23 July 2006) was a German chess master and writer.

== Biography ==
Teschner was seven times Champion of Berlin. In 1948, he won an East-Zones Championship in Bad Doberan, and later in 1951 took the German Championship (played in Düsseldorf).

Teschner was leading member of the German Chess Olympic team in 1952 and 1956. In 1957 he obtained the title of International Master from FIDE.

He was 2–3 in the Zonal tournament in Berg en Dal 1960 and twice 1–4 in Christmas tournaments in Reggio Emilia (1963/1964 and 1964/1965). Teschner played in the 1962 Interzonal tournament at Stockholm.

FIDE awarded him the complimentary Grandmaster title in 1992, the first in history. Chessmetrics retrospectively ranked him 40th in the world in May 1968 when he played very successful in the Bamberg tournament and won the prize for the most beautiful chess game.

Teschner worked between 1950 and 1988 as publisher of Deutsche Schachzeitung (German Chess News, the World's oldest surviving chess magazine), and wrote many books and articles about chess.

== Selected works ==
- Der kleine Bilguer, Berlin 1953 (with Kurt Richter)
- Schachmeisterpartien 1960-1965, Reclam, Stuttgart 1966
- Schachmeisterpartien 1966-1970, Reclam, Stuttgart 1971
- Meisterspiele - Unvergeßliche Schachpartien, Goldmann, München 1972
- Schachmeisterpartien 1971-1975, Reclam, Stuttgart 1977
- Turnierpartien der Gegenwart, Franckh, Stuttgart, 1978
- Sie sind am Zug - 300 Schach-Kombinationen, Goldmann, München 1979
- Das moderne Schachlehrbuch, Goldmann, München 1980
- Schachmeisterpartien 1976-1980, Reclam, Stuttgart 1983
- Schach für Fortgeschrittene, Falken, Niedernhausen/Ts. 1986
- Schachmeisterpartien 1981-1985, Reclam, Stuttgart 1986
- Schachmeisterpartien 1986-1990, Reclam, Stuttgart 1991
- Fischer gegen Spasski 1972 und 1992, Olms, Zürich 1993
- Eine Schule des Schachs in 40 Stunden, Olms, Zürich 1993 (available also in English and Spanish)
