= Elisaveta Bykova =

Soviet chess player (1913–1989)

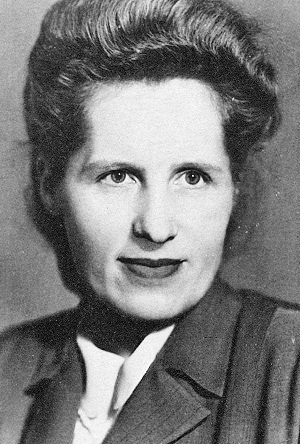

Personal information
- Born: Elisaveta Ivanovna Bykova; 4 November 1913 Bogolyubovo, Vladimir Oblast, Russian Empire
- Died: 8 March 1989 (aged 75) Moscow, Soviet Union

Chess career
- Country: Soviet Union
- Title: International Master (1953); Woman Grandmaster (1976)
- Women's World Champion: 1953–1956; 1958–1962

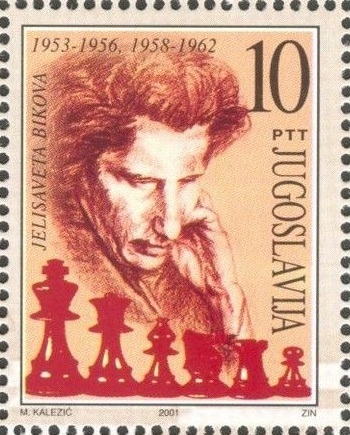
Bykova on a 2001 stamp of Yugoslavia

Elisaveta Ivanovna Bykova (or Elisabeth Bykova, Russian: Елизаве́та Ива́новна Бы́кова; 4 November 1913 – 8 March 1989) was a Soviet chess player and twice Women's World Chess Champion, from 1953 until 1956, and again from 1958 to 1962. She was awarded the titles of Woman International Master in 1950, International Master in 1953, and Woman Grandmaster in 1976. In 2013, she was inducted into the World Chess Hall of Fame.

== Career ==
Bykova was born to a peasant family. When she was twelve, her family moved to Moscow, where she began to play chess with her brother. Her talent became apparent in 1927, when she won her school's chess championship.

In 1938, she won the women's Moscow championship and after the Second World War she was a three-time winner of the Women's Soviet Chess Championship (1946, 1947 and 1950).

After winning in 1952 the Women's Candidates Tournament in Moscow, in 1953 she defeated in Leningrad the reigning champion Lyudmila Rudenko, with seven wins, five losses, and two draws. She lost the title to Olga Rubtsova in 1956, but won it back two years later, becoming the first woman to do so.

In 1960, she defended successfully the title against Kira Zvorykina (+6 –2 =5), but in 1962, she lost the title against the 21-year-old Nona Gaprindashvili (+0 –7 =4).

She worked as an engineer in a large Moscow printing house, and was also an author and columnist about chess in the USSR. Passionate about women's chess, Bykova also wrote three books about Vera Menchik, Soviet women chess players, and the Women's World Championship. She also promoted chess through lectures and the organization of tournaments.

Preceded by Lyudmila Rudenko	Women's World Chess Champion First reign 1953–1956	Succeeded by Olga Rubtsova
Preceded by Olga Rubtsova	Women's World Chess Champion Second reign 1958–1962	Succeeded by Nona Gaprindashvili
