= Wolfgang Unzicker =

German chess grandmaster (1925–2006)

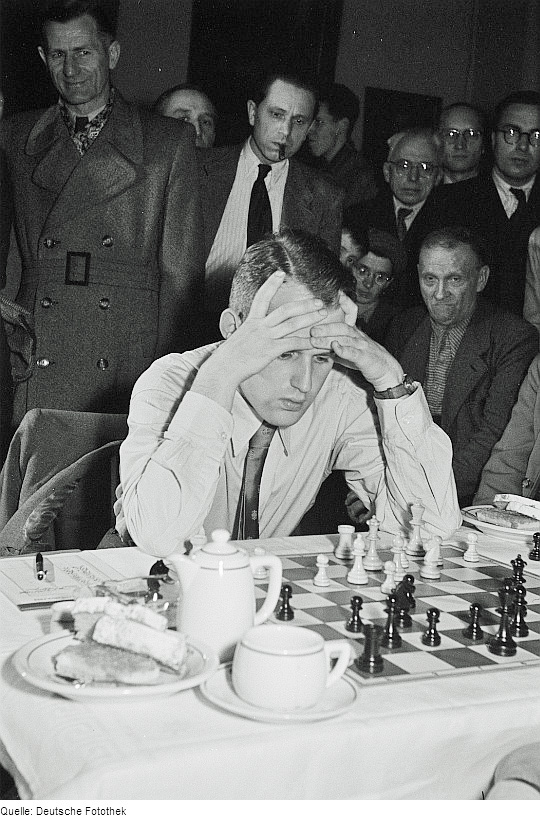
- Wolfgang Unzicker, 1953

Personal information
- Born: 26 June 1925 Pirmasens, Germany
- Died: 20 April 2006 (aged 80) Albufeira, Portugal

Chess career
- Country: Germany
- Title: Grandmaster (1954)
- Peak rating: 2545 (July 1971)
- Peak ranking: No. 38 (July 1971)

Wolfgang Unzicker (26 June 1925 – 20 April 2006) was one of the strongest German chess Grandmasters from 1945 to about 1970. He decided against making chess his profession, choosing law instead. Unzicker was at times the world's strongest amateur chess player, and World Champion Anatoly Karpov called him the "world champion of amateurs".

== Biography ==
Unzicker was born in Pirmasens, a small town near Kaiserslautern in the province of Rhineland-Palatinate noted for shoemaking. His father taught him how to play chess at age 10. His brother, four years older, was also a chess player but was killed in World War II. Unzicker began to play tournaments abroad in 1948 as Germany was struggling to rebuild after the war, and achieved the grandmaster title in 1954. He won the German Championship six times from 1948 to 1963 and tied for first in 1965. From 1950 to 1978 Unzicker played in twelve Chess Olympiads, and was first board on ten of them. He played nearly 400 times representing Germany's national team. For many years he was legal advisor for the German Chess Association.

His tournament victories include the first place tie (+6−0=9) with Boris Spassky at the Chigorin Memorial in Sochi 1965, first at Maribor 1967 ahead of Samuel Reshevsky, first at Krems, and first at Amsterdam 1980 tied with Hans Ree. In 1950, Unzicker shared the prize for best top-board score (+9−1=4) with Miguel Najdorf for his performance on first board for the West German team at the Dubrovnik Chess Olympiad. At the Tel Aviv 1964 Chess Olympiad Unzicker scored 13.5 points playing first board for the West German team that won the bronze medal on the strength of a 3:1 team victory over the Soviet Union. Unzicker also shared fourth place (+2−1=15) with Lajos Portisch in the 1966 Piatigorsky Cup in Santa Monica, California. Only Boris Spassky, Bobby Fischer, and Bent Larsen finished ahead of Unzicker. Unzicker placed ahead of world champion Tigran Petrosian, Samuel Reshevsky, Miguel Najdorf, Borislav Ivkov, and Hein Donner. At Hastings 1969–70, Unzicker finished second (+4−0=5) after Lajos Portisch and ahead of Svetozar Gligorić and former world champion Vasily Smyslov. Unzicker finished second (+3−2=7) to Viktor Korchnoi at South Africa 1979. A retired judge, he was still playing chess as first board on the club team "Tarrasch Munich".

Unzicker had a classical chess style modelled after the German player and theorist Siegbert Tarrasch. In 1956 he lost a match to Paul Keres in which both players chose to begin with the Ruy Lopez opening in all eight games.

In 2005, Unzicker celebrated his 80th birthday with his wife Freia, his three sons and their wives and three grandchildren, and a tournament with Karpov, Korchnoi and Spassky took place in his honor. Wolfgang Unzicker died on 20 April 2006, at the age of 80, during a holiday trip to Albufeira, Portugal. Notable Games Unzicker-Fisher Buenos Aires, 1960

1.e4 c5 2.Nf3 d6 3.d4 cxd4 4.Nxd4 Nf6 5.Nc3 a6 6.Bg5 e6 7.f4 Be7 8.Qf3 Qc7 9.O-O-O O-O 10.Bd3 Nc6 11.Nxc6 bxc6 12.Qg3 h5 13.e5 dxe5 14.fxe5 Ng4 15.Bxe7 Qxe7 16.Ne4 Qc7 17.h3 Nxe5 18.Nf6+ Kh8 19.Qg5 Nxd3+ 20.Rxd3 gxf6 21.Qxh5+ Kg7 22.Qg4+ 1-0
