= Ludwig Rellstab (chess player) =

German chess player (1904–1983)

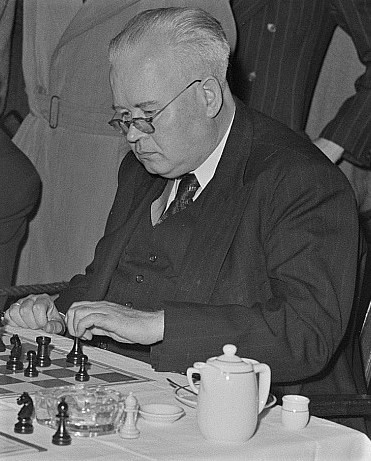
- Rellstab at the German Chess Championship, Hamburg 1953

Personal information
- Born: Ludwig Adolf Friedrich Hans Rellstab; 23 November 1904 Schöneberg, Berlin, German Empire
- Died: 14 February 1983 (aged 78) Wedel, Schleswig-Holstein, West Germany

Chess career
- Country: Germany
- Title: International Master (1950); International Arbiter (1951)
- Peak ranking: 25 (1938, unofficial)

Ludwig Rellstab (23 November 1904 – 14 February 1983) was a German chess player who won the German Chess Championship in 1942 and was awarded the International Master title in 1950.

== Biography ==
Rellstab was born in Schöneberg, Berlin to a distinguished family of academics and musicians. His great-grandfather, also named Ludwig Rellstab, was a well-known poet and music critic. His father Ludwig M. E. Rellstab was a professor of physics and electronics, who in 1914 became chief engineer at Siemens & Halske. His sister Annekäthe was a pianist.

== Chess career ==
He was German Champion, winning at Bad Oeynhausen 1942. He took 8th in the (unofficial) European Championship at Munich 1942 (Alexander Alekhine won). In 1943, he took 6th in Salzburg (Paul Keres and Alekhine won). In 1943, he took 5th in Vienna (10th GER-ch; Josef Lokvenc won).

Rellstab represented Germany at fifth board in the Munich 1936 unofficial Olympiad, and won two bronze medals (team and individual). He played for West Germany three times in the Chess Olympiad.

- In 1950, at fourth board in 9th Chess Olympiad in Dubrovnik (+3 −2 =6);
- In 1952, at second reserve board in 10th Chess Olympiad in Helsinki (+5 −1 =3);
- In 1954, at fourth board in 11th Chess Olympiad in Amsterdam (+2 −2 =2).

He won the individual gold medal at Helsinki 1952 and team bronze medal at Dubrovnik 1950.

Rellstab was awarded the International Master (IM) title in 1950 and the International Arbiter (IA) title in 1951. He died in Wedel in 1983.
