= Georg Kieninger =

German chess player

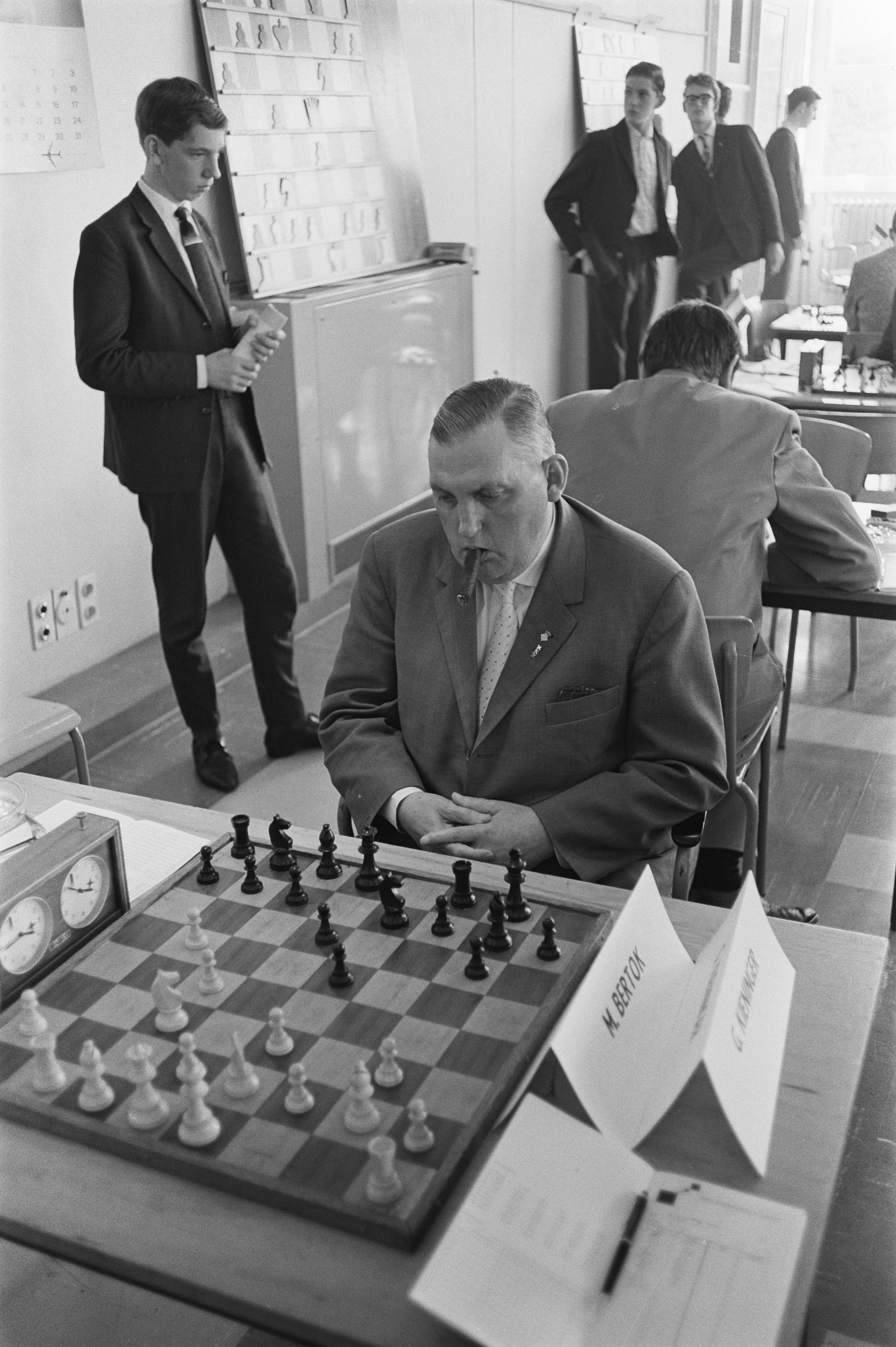
Georg Kieninger (Amsterdam, 1963)

Georg Kieninger (5 June 1902, in Munich – 25 January 1975, in Düsseldorf) was a German chess player and International Master (IM).

A cigar smoker, Kieninger was nicknamed "Eiserner Schorsch" (roughly translated as "Iron Georgie") because of his fighting style. He won the German Chess Championship in 1937, 1940, and 1947. In 1950, FIDE awarded him the IM title.

His major openings were the Ruy Lopez and the French Defence (MacCutcheon Variation). The Kieninger Trap in the Budapest Gambit (1.d4 Nf6 2.c4 e5 3.dxe5 Ng4 4.Bf4 Nc6 5.Nf3 Bb4+ 6.Nbd2 Qe7 7.a3 Ngxe5! 8.axb4?? Nd3#) is named after him.
