= Josef Lokvenc =

Austrian chess player

- Born: 1 May 1899; Vienna, Austria-Hungary
- Died: 2 April 1974 (aged 74); Sankt Pölten, Austria
- Occupation: chess master
- Known for: Chess Master (1925)
- Notable work: Austrian Championship (1953)

Josef Lokvenc (1 May 1899, in Vienna – 2 April 1974, in Sankt Pölten) was an Austrian chess master.

In 1925, he was awarded the Chess Master title in Braunau. In 1926, he took 3rd in Vienna. In 1936, he tied for 6-7th in Vienna (19th Trebitsch-Turnier; Henryk Friedman won). In 1938, he tied for 6-7th in Bad Harzburg (Vasja Pirc won). In June 1939, he tied for 2nd-4th in Bad Elster (Erich Eliskases won). In July 1939, he took 2nd, behind Eliskases, in Bad Oeynhausen (6th German Championship). In November 1940, he took 4th in Kraków/Krynica/Warsaw (1st General Government chess tournament). In April 1943, he tied for 6-9th in Prague. The event was won by Alexander Alekhine ahead of Paul Keres. In August 1943, he won in Vienna (10th GER-ch). In December 1943, he won in Krynica (the 4th GG-ch).

After World War II, Lokvenc tied for 2nd-3rd in Vienna in 1947. In 1951, he tied for 7-8th in Marienbad (zt). In 1951/52, he tied for 2nd-4th in Vienna. He shared 1st in 1951 and won in 1953 the Austrian Championship. In 1954, he tied for 9-10th in Munich.

Lokvenc played for Austria in nine Chess Olympiads: 1927, 1928, 1930, 1952, 1954, 1956, 1958, 1960, and 1962.

He was awarded the International Master (IM) title in 1951.
