= Judit Polgár =

Hungarian chess grandmaster (born 1976)

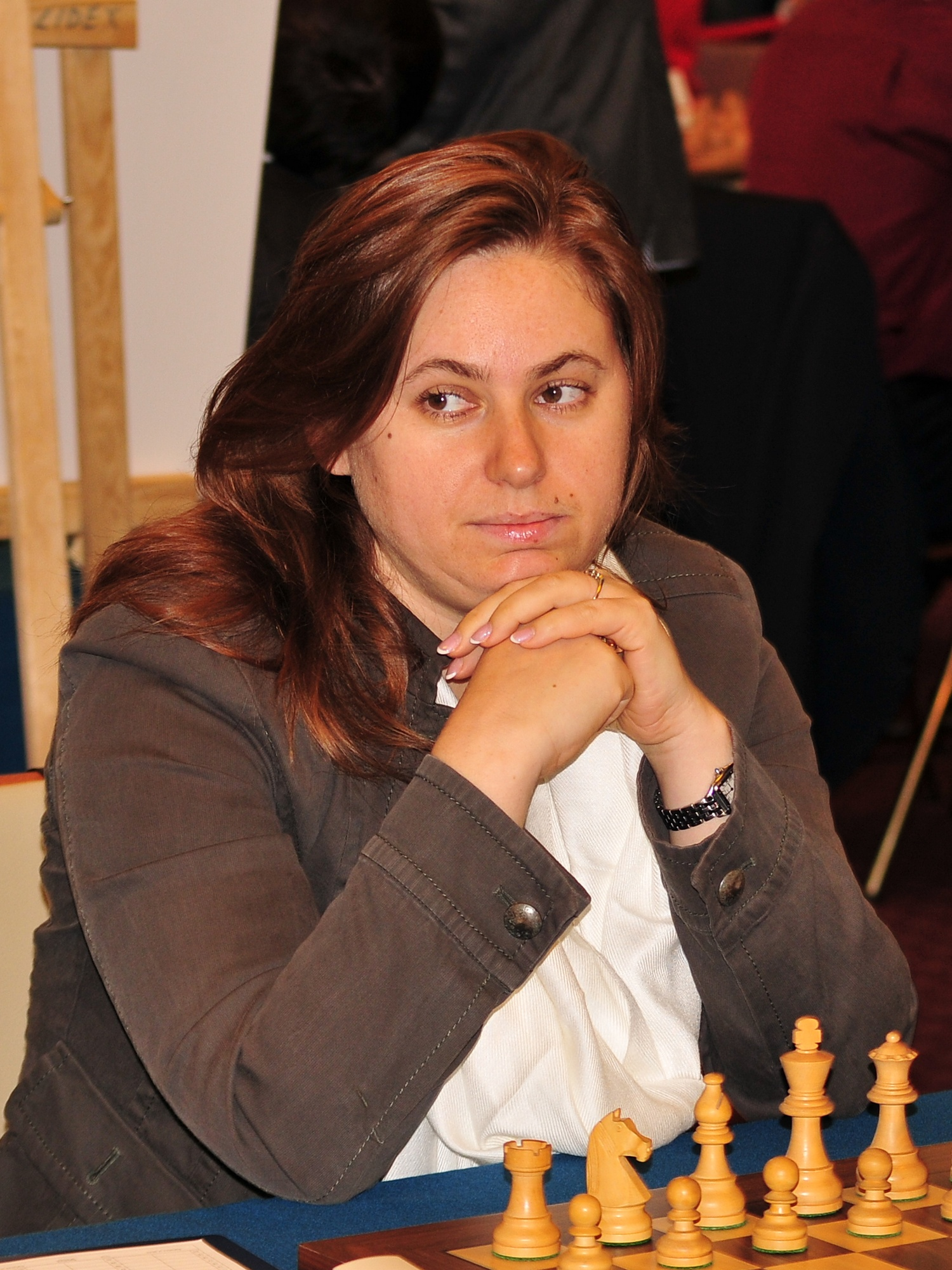
- Polgár in 2013 (Warsaw)

Personal information
- Citizenship: Hungary
- Born: 23 July 1976 (age 50) Budapest, Hungary
- Spouse: Gusztáv Font (m. 2000)
- Children: 2
- Parents: László Polgár (father); Klára Polgár (mother)
- Relatives: Sofia Polgar (sister); Susan Polgar (sister)

Chess career
- Country: Hungary
- Title: Grandmaster (1991)
- FIDE rating: 2675 (November 2026) (inactive since September 2015)
- Peak rating: 2735 (July 2005)
- Peak ranking: No. 8 (January 2004); No. 1 woman (January 1989)

Judit Polgár (Note: Hungarian: Polgár Judit, pronounced [ˈpolɡaːr ˈjudit]) (born 23 July 1976) is a Hungarian chess grandmaster, widely regarded as the strongest female chess player of all time. She is the only woman to be ranked in the world top 10 (in 2004-05), the only woman to achieve a rating over 2700, reaching a peak rating of 2735, and the only woman to compete in the final stage of a World Chess Championship. She was the top-rated woman in the world from January 1989 until her retirement from competitive chess in 2014, remaining No. 1 until the March 2015 rating list, (Note: Then, as she could not be removed from the list for the next 12 months, on the March 2015 rating list, she was "officially" overtaken by Chinese player Hou Yifan; she was the No. 1 again in the August 2015 women's rating list, in her last appearance in the FIDE world rankings.) a record of 26 consecutive years as woman's No. 1. Through this she never competed for the women's world championship, just in tournaments and matches.

Polgár was a chess prodigy, and at age 12 became the youngest player to break into the FIDE top-100 rating list, ranked 55 in the January 1989 list. In 1991, she became the youngest player at the time to achieve the title of Grandmaster, at the age of 15 years and 4 months, breaking the 33-year-old record held by former world champion Bobby Fischer. With the achievement, she became only the fourth-ever female Grandmaster, achieving the title the same year her older sister Susan had become the third-ever female Grandmaster.

Polgár won or shared first in the chess tournaments of Hastings 1993, Madrid 1994, León 1996, U.S. Open 1998, Hoogeveen 1999, Sigeman & Co 2000, Japfa 2000, and the Najdorf Memorial 2000. She is the only woman to have won a game against a reigning world number one player (Garry Kasparov, in 2002), and defeated eleven current or former world champions in either rapid or classical chess: Magnus Carlsen, Anatoly Karpov, Kasparov, Vladimir Kramnik, Boris Spassky, Vasily Smyslov, Veselin Topalov, Viswanathan Anand, Ruslan Ponomariov, Alexander Khalifman, and Rustam Kasimdzhanov.

On 13 August 2014, she announced her retirement from competitive chess. In June 2015, Polgár was elected as the new captain and head coach of the Hungarian national men's team. On 20 August 2015, she received Hungary's highest decoration, the Grand Cross of the Order of Saint Stephen of Hungary. In 2021, Polgár was inducted into the World Chess Hall of Fame. In September 2024, as part of FIDE's centennial celebration, Polgár was awarded the FIDE 100 Award as the best female player of the past 100 years.

== Early life ==
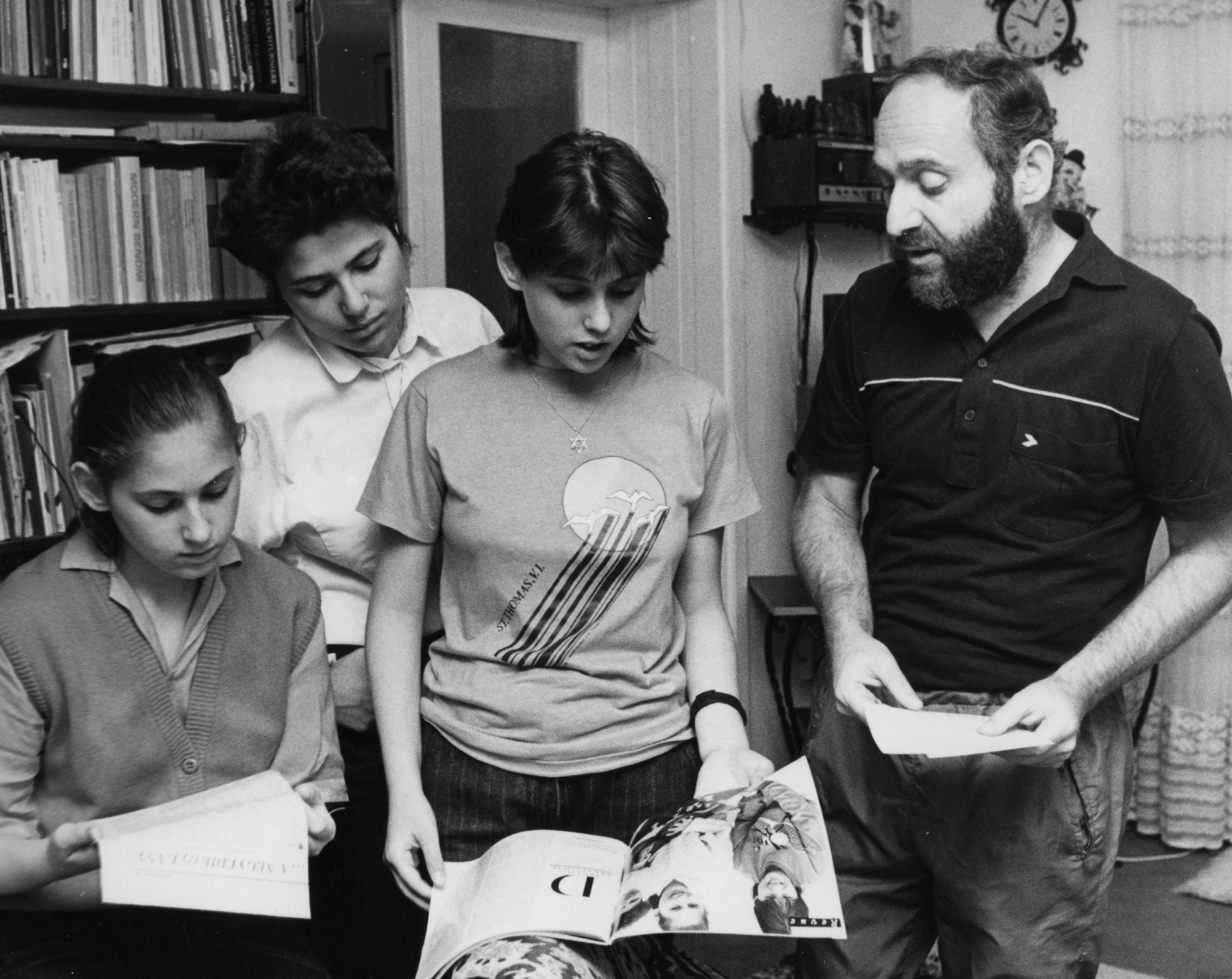
Judit, Zsuzsa, Zsófia and László Polgár, 1989

Polgár was born on 23 July 1976 in Budapest to a Jewish-Hungarian family. Polgár and her two older sisters, Grandmaster Susan and International Master Sofia, were part of an educational experiment carried out by their father, László Polgár, in an attempt to prove that children could make exceptional achievements if trained in a specialist subject from a very early age. "Geniuses are made, not born," was László's thesis. He and his wife Klára educated their three daughters at home, with chess as the specialist subject. László also taught his three daughters the international language Esperanto. They also received criticism at the time from some Western commentators for depriving the sisters of a normal childhood.

Traditionally, chess had been a male-dominated activity, and women were often seen as weaker players, thus advancing the idea of a Women's World Champion. However, from the beginning, László was against the idea that his daughters had to participate in female-only events. "Women are able to achieve results similar, in fields of intellectual activities, to that of men," he wrote. "Chess is a form of intellectual activity, so this applies to chess. Accordingly, we reject any kind of discrimination in this respect." This put the Polgárs in conflict with the Hungarian Chess Federation of the day, whose policy was for women to play in women-only tournaments , even though there is no men-only tournaments (all levels of chess competition are open, except the women-only).

== Career ==
Polgár rarely played in women-only tournaments or divisions and has never competed for the Women's World Championship: "I always say that women should have the self-confidence that they are as good as male players, but only if they are willing to work and take it seriously as much as male players." While László Polgár has been credited with being an excellent chess coach, the Polgárs had also employed professional chessplayers to train their daughters, including Hungarian champion IM Tibor Florian, GM Pal Benko, and Russian GM Alexander Chernin. Susan Polgár, the eldest of the sisters, 5½ years older than Sofia and 7 years older than Judit, was the first of the sisters to achieve prominence in chess by winning tournaments, and by 1986, she was the world's top-rated female chess player. Initially, being the youngest, Judit was separated from her sisters while they were in training. However, this only served to increase Judit's curiosity. After she had learned the rules, they discovered Judit was able to find solutions to the problems they were studying, and she began to be invited into the group. One evening, Susan was studying an endgame with their trainer, a strong International Master. Unable to find the solution, they woke Judit, who was asleep in bed and carried her into the training room. Still half asleep, Judit showed them how to solve the problem, after which they put her back to bed. László Polgár's experiment would produce a family of one international master and two grandmasters and would strengthen the argument for nurture over nature, as well as prove women could be chess grandmasters.

=== Child prodigy ===
Trained in her early years by her sister Susan, Judit Polgár was a chess prodigy from an early age. At age 5, she defeated a family friend without looking at the board. After the game, the friend joked: "You are good at chess, but I'm a good cook." Judit replied: "Do you cook without looking at the stove?" However, according to Susan, Judit's ability was borne of hard work, not an abnormally great natural ability. Explaining this, Susan said, "Judit was a slow starter, but very hard-working." Polgár described herself at that age as "obsessive" about chess. She first defeated an International Master, Dolfi Drimer, at age 10 and a grandmaster, Lev Gutman, at age 11.

Polgár vs. V. Metodiev,
Albena 1986

Position: a8 black rook, c8 black bishop, g8 black king, c7 black queen, d7 black pawn, f7 black rook, h7 black pawn, a6 black pawn, g6 black pawn, d5 black pawn, e5 white pawn, g5 white queen, c4 black pawn, d4 white knight, f3 white pawn, a2 white pawn, b2 white pawn, c2 white pawn, g2 white pawn, c1 white king, d1 white rook, h1 white rook

1.Rxh7 Rxh7 2.Qxg6+ Kh8 3.Qe8+ with mate to follow. Polgár was 10 years old.

Judit started playing in tournaments at 6 years old, and by age 9 her rating with the Hungarian Chess Federation was 2080. She was a member of a chess club in Budapest, where she would get experience from master level players. In 1984 in Budapest, Sofia and Judit, at the time 9 and 7 years of age, respectively, played two games of blindfold chess against two masters, which they won. At one point the girls complained that one of their opponents was playing too slowly and suggested a clock should be used.

In April 1986, 9-year-old Judit played in her first rated tournament in the U.S., finishing first in the unrated section of the New York Open, winning US$1,000. All three Polgár sisters competed. Susan, 16, competed in the grandmaster section and had a victory against GM Walter Browne, and Sofia, 11, finished second in her section, but Judit gathered most of the attention in the tournament. Grandmasters would drop by to watch the serious, quiet child playing. She won her first seven games before drawing the final game. Although the unrated section had many of the weaker players in the Open, it also had players of expert strength who were foreign to the United States and had not been rated yet. Milorad Boskovic related a conversation with Judit's sixth-round opponent, a Yugoslav player he knew to be a strong expert: "He told me he took some chances in the game because he couldn't believe she was going to attack so well." Since Judit was not yet able to speak English very well, her mother interpreted as she told a reporter her goal was to be a chess professional. When the reporter asked her if she would be world champion one day, Judit answered: "I will try."

In January 1987, 10-year-old Judit defeated Romanian International Master Dolfi Drimer in the Adsteam Lidums International Tournament in Adelaide, Australia. Edmar Mednis said he played his best game of the tournament in beating Judit: "I was careful in that game... Grandmasters don't like to lose to 10-year-old girls, because then we make the front page of all the papers."

In April 1988, Polgár became the youngest girl to make an International Master when she made her first International Master norm in the International B section of the New York Open, at 11 years and nine months; this age record stood until Bodhana Sivanandan surpassed it in July 2026. In August 1988, Polgár won the under-12 "Boys" section of the World Youth Chess and Peace Festival in Timișoara, Romania. In October 1988, she finished first in a 10-player round-robin tournament in London, scoring 7–2, for a half point lead over Israeli GM Yair Kraidman. With her April, August, and October results, she completed the requirements for the International Master title; at the time, she was the youngest player ever to have achieved this distinction. Both Bobby Fischer and Garry Kasparov were 14 when they were awarded the title; Polgár was 12. It was during this time that former world champion Mikhail Tal said Polgár had the potential to win the World Championship. She was surpassed as the youngest ever International Master, but long remained the youngest ever female International Master, until Bodhana Sivanandan surpassed her at the age of 11 years, 7 months, and 16 days in October 2026.

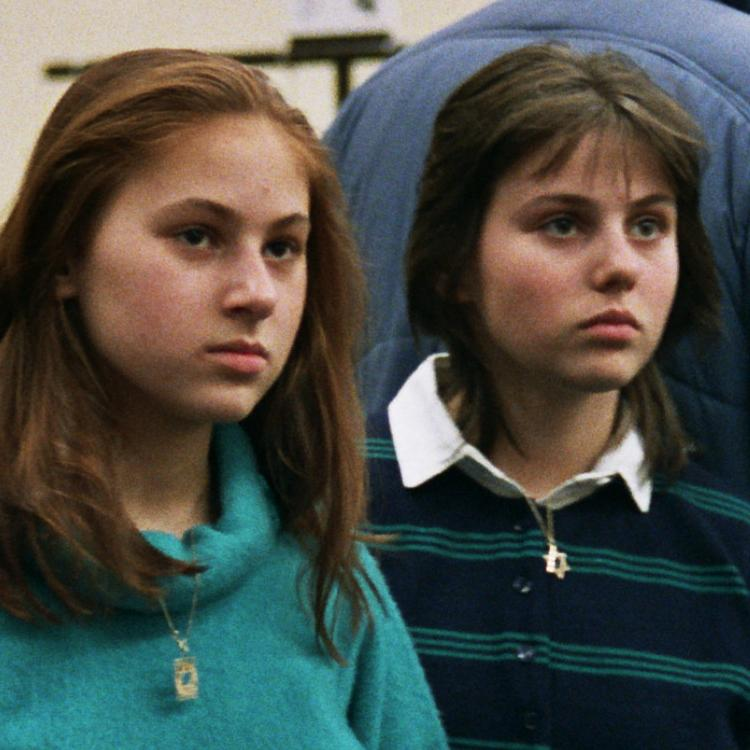
Judit (left) with sister Sofia at Thessaloniki, 1988

Judit was asked about playing against boys instead of in the girls' section of tournaments: "These other girls are not serious about chess... I practice five or six hours a day, but they get distracted by cooking and work around the house."

In November 1988, Judit and her sisters, along with Ildikó Mádl, represented Hungary in the Women's section of the 28th Chess Olympiad in Thessaloniki. The International Chess Federation would not permit the Polgárs to play against men in team competitions. Prior to the tournament, Eduard Gufeld, Soviet GM and team coach for the Soviet women's team, dismissed the Polgárs: "I believe that these girls are going to lose a good part of their quickly acquired image in the 28th Olympiad... Afterward we are going to know if the Hungarian sisters are geniuses or just women!" However, the Hungarian women's team won the championship, which marked the first time it was not won by the Soviet Union. Judit played board 2 and finished the tournament with the highest score of 12½–½ to win the individual gold medal. She also won the brilliancy prize for her game against Pavlina Angelova.

In the January 1989 Elo rating list, at the age of 12, she was rated 2555, which was number 55 in the world, the top woman in the world, 35 rating points ahead of the Women's World Champion Maia Chiburdanidze, and 45 points ahead of her sister Susan. In the six months since the previous list, she had gained a remarkable 190 rating points. The British Chess Magazine declared: "Judit Polgár's recent results make the performances of Fischer and Kasparov at a similar age pale by comparison."

Judit's quiet and modest demeanour at the board contrasted with the intensity of her playing style. British GM David Norwood, in recalling Judit beating him when he was an established player and she was just a child, described her as "this cute little auburn-haired monster who crushed you." British journalist Dominic Lawson wrote about 12-year-old Judit's "killer" eyes and how she would stare at her opponent: "The irises are so grey, so dark they are almost indistinguishable from the pupils. Set against her long red hair, the effect is striking."

In 1990, British GM Nigel Short called Judit "one of the three or four greatest chess prodigies in history". However, Kasparov expressed early doubts: "She has fantastic chess talent, but she is, after all, a woman. It all comes down to the imperfections of the feminine psyche. No woman can sustain a prolonged battle." Later in life, however, after he had lost a rapid game against Polgár himself in 2002, Kasparov revised his opinion: "The Polgárs showed that there are no inherent limitations to their aptitude—an idea that many male players refused to accept until they had unceremoniously been crushed by a twelve-year-old with a ponytail."

In 1989, Polgár tied with Boris Gelfand for third in the OHRA Open in Amsterdam, earning her first Grandmaster norm.

By now, numerous books and articles had been written about the Polgár sisters, making them famous even outside of the world of chess. In 1989, American President George H. W. Bush and his wife Barbara met with the Polgárs during their visit to Hungary. Although not released until 1996, in 1990 a documentary about children playing chess, Chess Kids, featuring Polgár, was filmed. The documentary did not include an interview with Polgár as her father required payment.

In 1990, Judit won the Boys section of the under-14 in the World Youth Chess Festival in Fond du Lac, Wisconsin. Also in 1990, Judit and her sisters represented Hungary in the Women's Olympiad, winning the gold medal. It was the last women-only tournament in which Judit would participate.

In October 1991, Judit finished with 5½–3½, tied for third position with Zoltán Ribli and John Nunn, at a tournament in Vienna.

=== Grandmaster ===
In December 1991, Polgár achieved the grandmaster title by winning the Hungarian National Championship, at the time the youngest ever at 15 years, 4 months to have achieved the title. This beat Fischer's record by a month. This made her both the first woman to be the youngest-ever grandmaster and the fourth woman to become a grandmaster (after Nona Gaprindashvili, Maia Chiburdanidze and Polgar's sister Susan). With this, Polgar also beat her sister Susan's record for youngest-ever female grandmaster, obtained earlier in January 1991, by over 7 years. Hungary, one of the strongest chess-playing countries, had all but one of their strongest players participate in that year's championship, as only Zoltán Ribli was missing. Going into the last round, Polgár needed only a draw to achieve the GM title, but she won her game against GM Tibor Tolnai to finish first, with six points in nine games.

In 1992, Polgár tied for second, behind Anatoly Karpov at the Madrid International in Linares. She and Russian GM Vladimir Epishin finished with 5½–3½. In July 1992, she placed second in the Reshevsky Memorial in Manhattan, finishing with four wins, five draws and no losses. In September 1992, Polgár participated in a tournament held in Aruba in which a team of senior men's players competed against a team of top women players. The men's team consisted of Lev Polugaevsky, Wolfgang Uhlmann, Oscar Panno, Efim Geller, Borislav Ivkov and Vasily Smyslov. The women's team consisted of Judit and Susan Polgár, Pia Cramling, Chiburdanidze, Ketevan Arakhamia and Alisa Galliamova. The men won the tournament 39–33. The overall high scorer was Polugaevsky, 57 years old with Polgár, 16, finishing second with 7½–4½.

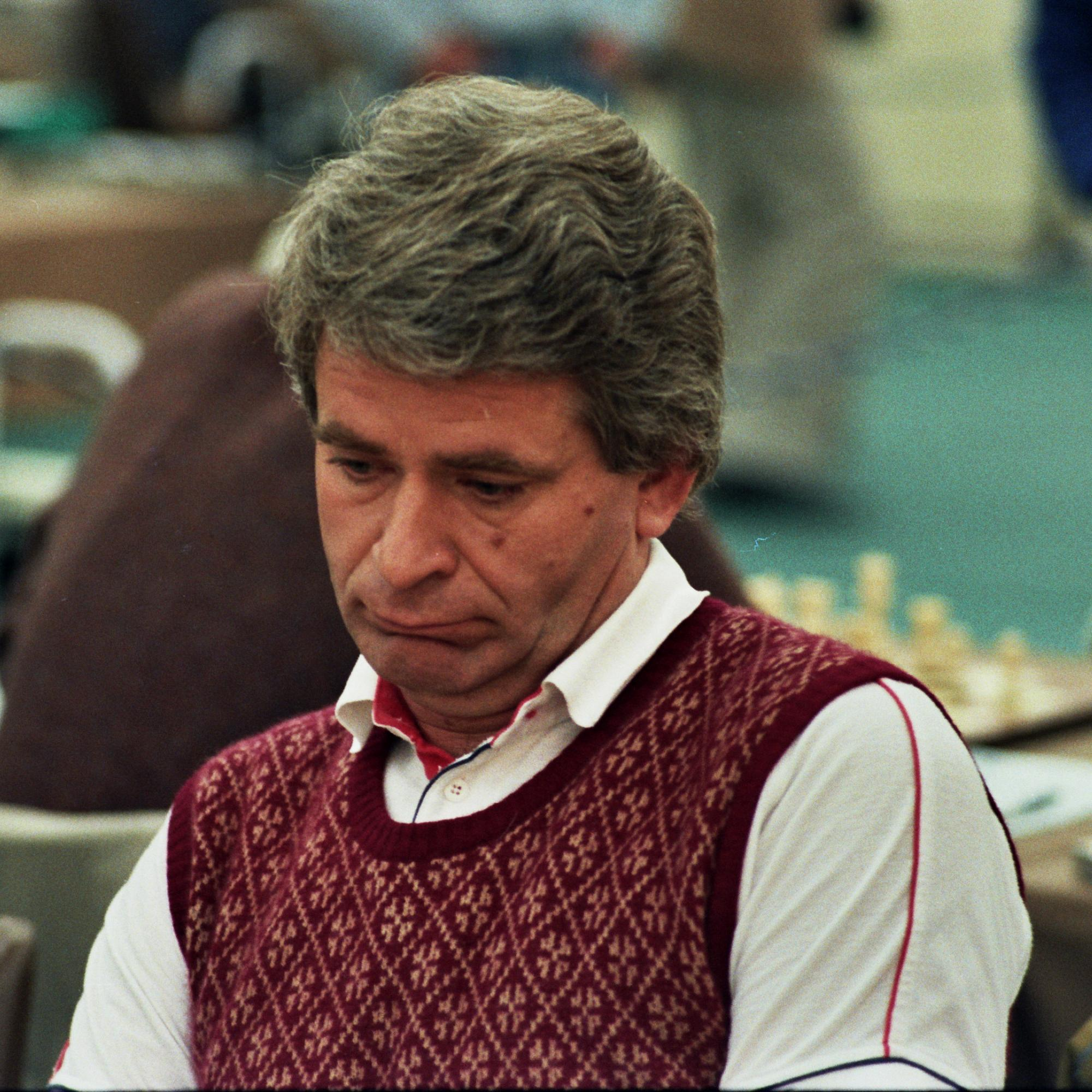
In 1993, Polgár defeated former world champion Boris Spassky (pictured here in 1984) in an exhibition match.

Polgár then tied for first in the Hastings tournament held over New Year's, 1992–93. Russian GM Evgeny Bareev, at the time ranked eighth in the world, led going into tournament's last round, but was defeated by Polgár in their second individual game, allowing her to share first. Immediately following the Hastings tournament, Polgár played an exhibition match in February against former World Champion, Boris Spassky. She won the match 5½–4½ and won $110,000, the largest prize money to that point in her career. Polgár also participated in the Melody Amber tournament in Monaco which featured a blindfold tournament of 12 grandmasters. Anand and Karpov finished first, Ljubojević third, while Polgár finished in clear fourth with 6½ points from 11 rounds, ahead of other strong GMs such as Ivanchuk, Short, Korchnoi and her sister Susan.

In 1993, Polgár became the first woman ever to qualify for an Interzonal tournament. In March, she finished in a four-way tie for second place in the Budapest Zonal and won the tiebreaking tournament. She then confirmed her status as one of the world's leading players, narrowly failing to qualify for the Candidates Tournaments at the rival FIDE and PCA Interzonal tournaments.

In the summer of 1993, Bobby Fischer stayed for a time in the Polgár household. He had been living in seclusion in Yugoslavia due to an arrest warrant issued by the United States for violating the UN blockade of Yugoslavia with his 1992 match against Spassky. Susan Polgár met Fischer with her family and persuaded him to come out of hiding "in a cramped hotel room in a small Yugoslavian village". During his stay, he played many games of Fischer random chess and helped the sisters analyse their games. Susan said that he was friendly on a personal level and recalled mostly pleasant moments with him as their guest, although conflicts arose due to his political views. On the suggestion of a friend of Fischer, a match of blitz chess between Fischer and Polgár was arranged and announced to the press. However, problems ensued between Fischer and László Polgár and Fischer cancelled the match, telling a friend who asked if the match would take place, "No, they're Jewish."

In the summer of 1994, Polgár had the greatest success of her career to that point, when she won the Madrid International in Spain. Against a field which included Gata Kamsky, Evgeny Bareev, Valery Salov and Ivan Sokolov, she finished 7–2 and 1½ points ahead of second place. Her performance rating for the tournament was 2778 against an opposition rated at 2672.

In October 1994, she played in a tournament in Buenos Aires which was a tribute to an ailing Polugaevsky. Eight grandmasters participated, all considered contenders for the world championship: Karpov, Anand, Salov, Ivanchuk, Kamsky, Shirov, Ljubojević and Polgár. The tournament was unusual as Black in each game was required to play a Sicilian Defence, since Polugaevsky was considered the all-time authority on the opening. This was to Polgár's advantage as it was her favourite. Against the elite competition she finished tied for third with Ivanchuk.

In September 1995, Polgár finished third with a score of 7–4 in the Donner Memorial in Amsterdam, behind Jan Timman and Julio Granda, who tied for first, and ahead of Yasser Seirawan, Alexander Huzman, Alexei Shirov, Alexander Khalifman, Alexander Morozevich and Valery Salov. She secured a clear third place with a 21-move win over Shirov in her last game. In Aruba in November 1995, she played in a friendly match against Jeroen Piket of the Netherlands, at the time one of the top players in Europe. Despite being closely matched in ratings, Polgár won the match 6–2.

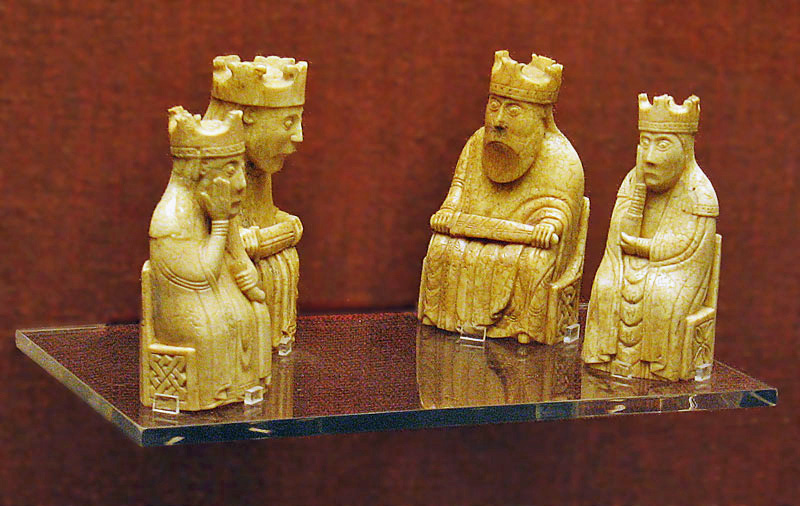
Lewis chessmen

In 1995, the Isle of Lewis chess club in Scotland attempted to arrange a game between Polgár and Nigel Short in which the Lewis chessmen, a chess set carved in the 12th century, would be used. However, the British Museum refused to release the set despite assurances that the players would wear gloves. Scottish member of parliament Calum MacDonald pointed out that the set would be safe, especially as chess was not a contact sport. In the end, the Museum allowed the chess set to be displayed at the Isle of Lewis festival tournament, but it was not used in any games. Polgár won the double round-robin tournament of four GMs, scoring five points in the six games and winning both her games against Short.

==== Kasparov touch-move controversy ====
Polgár vs. Kasparov, Linares 1994

Position: e8 black rook, g8 black king, b7 white bishop, d7 black knight, f7 black pawn, g7 black pawn, b6 black pawn, d6 white queen, f6 black knight, h6 black pawn, e5 black pawn, f5 white pawn, a4 black queen, b2 white pawn, c2 black rook, d2 white knight, g2 white pawn, h2 white pawn, d1 white rook, e1 white rook, h1 white king

The position before the move in question. Allegedly, Kasparov played 36...Nc5?, which loses the exchange to 37.Bc6, quickly realised his error, and substituted 36...Nf8.

At Linares 1994, Polgár lost a game to the World Champion Garry Kasparov in which Kasparov was accused of breaking the touch-move rule. The tournament marked the first time the 17-year-old Polgár was invited to compete with the world's strongest players. After four games, she had two points. During her game with Kasparov in the fifth round, Kasparov gradually outplayed her and had a clear advantage after 35 moves. On his 36th move, the World Champion reportedly changed his mind about the move of a knight and moved the piece to a different square. According to chess rules, once a player has released a piece, the move must stand, so if Kasparov did remove his hand, he should have been required to play his original move. Polgár did not challenge Kasparov in the moment, later saying "I was playing the World Champion and didn't want to cause unpleasantness during my first invitation to such an important event. I was also afraid that if my complaint was overruled I would be penalized on the clock when we were in time pressure." She did, however, look questioningly at the arbiter, Carlos Falcon, who witnessed the incident and took no action.

The incident was caught on tape by a crew from the Spanish television company PVS, and the videotape showed that Kasparov's fingers had left the knight. Tournament director Carlos Falcon did not forfeit Kasparov when this evidence was made available to him. U.S. chess journalist Shelby Lyman supported this, writing that in the majority of sports, "instant replays" do not overrule a referee's original decision and chess is no exception. The video was not publicly released, at the request of tournament sponsor Luis Rentero. At one point, Polgár reportedly confronted Kasparov in the hotel bar, asking him, "How could you do this to me?" Following this incident, Kasparov bluntly told an interviewer "... she just publicly said I was cheating. ... I think a girl of her age should be taught some good manners before making such statements." Subsequently, Kasparov refused to speak to her for three years. He told reporters that his conscience was clear, as he was not aware of his hand leaving the piece. Although Polgár recovered by the end of the tournament, she went into a slump over the next six rounds, gaining only half a point. The incident may also have had an effect on Kasparov, who was considered to have delivered a subpar performance in the tournament.

=== Top 10 player ===
Polgár is generally considered the strongest female chess player of all time. In January 1996, she became the only woman ever to be ranked in the top ten of all chess players. In August 1996, she participated in a very strong 10-player tournament in Vienna. There was a three-way tie for first between Karpov, Topalov and Boris Gelfand and a three-way tie for fourth between Kramnik, Polgár and Lékó. In December 1996, Polgár played a match in São Paulo against Brazil's champion Gilbert Milos. The four games were played at 30 moves an hour with 30 minutes for the remainder of the game. Polgár won two, drew one and lost one, earning $12,000 in prize money.

In February 1997, she played in the Linares "supertournament" which Kasparov won by edging out Kramnik. Polgár finished in clear fifth position in the 12-GM tournament, ahead of Anand, Ivanchuk, Gelfand and Shirov. Her result was considered exceptional considering the strength of the tournament, average 2701, and she was praised for her tactical skills in her game against Ivanchuk. In April 1997, she played in the Dos Hermanas Chess tournament, a single round-robin category XIX event of 10 of the world's best players. She finished in sixth place with an even score of 4½–4½. In June 1997, she finished with an even score, 4½–4½, in the Madrid 10-player GM tournament won by Topalov. In July 1997, Polgár competed in the elite Dortmund International Tournament. She finished in fifth in the strong field of ten, ahead of players such as Anatoly Karpov. In the tournament, she won playing with the black pieces against Veselin Topalov, at the time ranked fourth in the world. Topalov had the advantage until Polgár executed a deep positional sacrifice. In October 1997, she tied for second in a double round-robin tournament of four grandmasters in the VAM International Tournament in Hoogeveen, the Netherlands.

"There has long been a lively debate about who is the strongest player of all", wrote GM Robert Byrne in his New York Times column of 26 August 1997. "Prominent candidates are Bobby Fischer, Garry Kasparov, Jose Raul Capablanca, Alexander Alekhine or Emanuel Lasker. But there is no argument about the greatest female player: she is 21-year-old Judit Polgár."

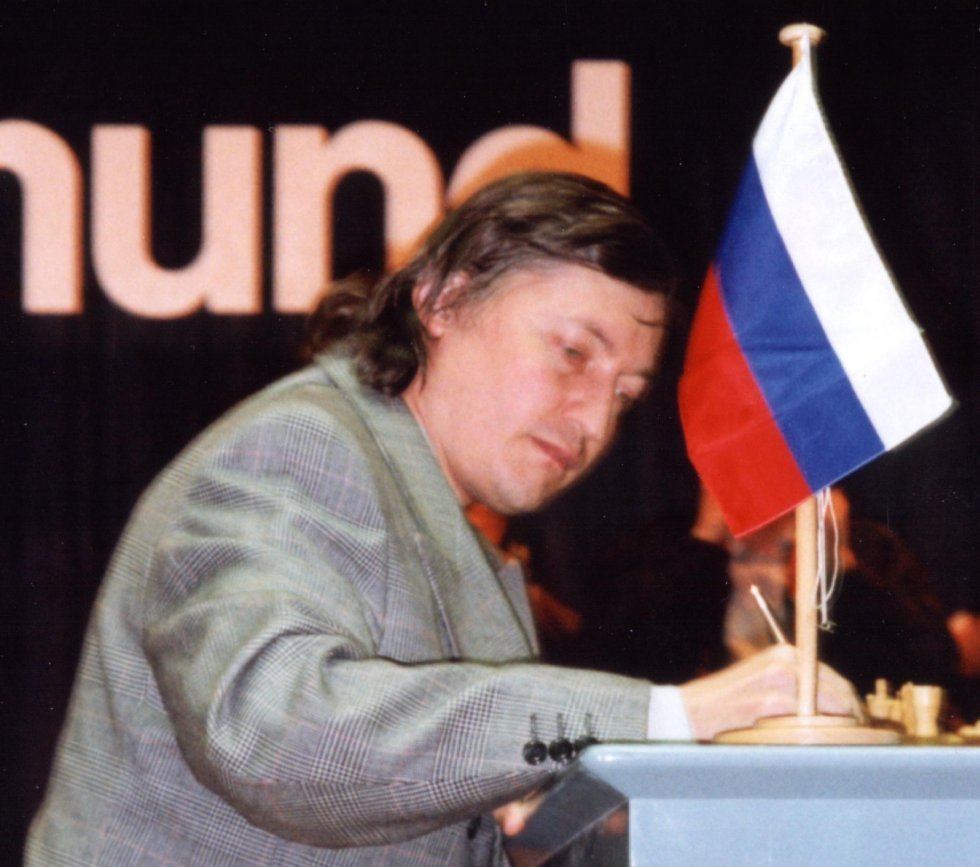
In 1998 Polgár defeated Anatoly Karpov in a match of "action" chess (30 minutes per game). At the time Karpov was FIDE World Champion.

In January 1998, she played in the category XVII event, the Hoogovens in Wijk aan Zee, Netherlands, in which 14 of the world's top grandmasters participated. She finished in the middle of the pack, tied for sixth–tenth position with Karpov, Topalov and Jeroen Piket and an even score of 6½ points in thirteen games. Polgár handed co-winner Viswanathan Anand his only loss of the tournament. In June 1998 in Budapest, Polgár played an eight-game match of "action" chess, which is 30 minutes for the entire game, against Anatoly Karpov. She won the match 5–3 by winning two games with the remaining ending in draws. At the time Karpov was the FIDE World Champion. In August 1998, Polgár became the first woman ever to win the U.S. Open, which was held at the Kona Surf Resort in Kailua-Kona, Hawaii. She shared the tournament victory with GM Boris Gulko as each scored 8–1. Typical of her aggressive style was her victory against GM Georgi Kacheishvili, in which she sacrificed her queen for the attack. In October 1998, Polgár won the VAM four-grandmaster tournament in Hoogeveen, Netherlands, by 1½ points over Jan Timman. In November 1998, Polgár played in the Wydra Memorial Rapid chess tournament in Israel. She tied for first with Viswanathan Anand as both scored 11½ out of the 14 games. Anand won the tournament in a tie-break game over Polgár.

In the two years since Polgár became the first woman ever to break into the top 10, her rating had dropped. Although she was in the top 20, this had the effect of her being invited less frequently to the strongest tournaments.

In October 1999, Polgár participated in the four-player GM section of the VAM Chess tournament in Hoogeveen, Netherlands. Jan Timman led early in the tournament, but Polgár staged a comeback scoring 3 points in the last 4 games to share first place. Anatoly Karpov finished in third and Darmen Sadvakasov fourth.

In January 2000, Polgár had, for her, a disappointing result in a tournament in Pamplona, Spain, which was won by Nigel Short. She finished with only 4 points from 9 games, tied for 6–7 place with Jan Timman, who had also played below his rating. Polgár had another disappointing result later in the month in the category XVIII tournament in Corus Wijk aan Zee which was won by Kasparov. She did not win a game until the 11th round and finished with 5 points in 13 games, tied with Victor Korchnoi for 11–12 position among the fourteen GMs. However, in the European Teams Championship in Batumi, Georgia, also in January, she won the gold medal playing Board 2, scoring 6½–2½.

In April and May 2000, Polgár won one of the strongest tournaments ever held in Asia. The Japfa Classic in Denpasar, Bali, Indonesia, was a category XVI event of 10 players which included Alexander Khalifman—at the time FIDE world champion—and Anatoly Karpov, his predecessor. Going into the last round, four players, Polgár, Khalifman, Karpov and Gilberto Milos, were tied, but Polgár won her game over Brazilian GM Milos while Khalifman and Karpov played against each other in a draw. Polgár finished clear first with 6½–2½, winning the $20,000 first place prize money. At the end of May, she won the Sigeman & Company International Tournament in Malmö, Sweden. She finished the four-player double round-robin tournament scoring 4 points, with Jan Timman at 3½ with Ulf Andersson and Tiger Hillarp-Persson finishing in that order. In June 2000, she played in the GM Tournament Mérida, State of Yucatán, finishing in second place a half point behind Alexei Shirov. In September 2000, she shared first place in the Najdorf Chess Festival with Viktor Bologan, ahead of Nigel Short and Anatoly Karpov. In October and November, she represented Hungary playing board 3 in the 34th Chess Olympiad. While the Hungarian team narrowly missed winning the bronze medal, Polgár finished 10/13 for the second highest points total of any player in the Olympiad and a rated performance level of 2772.

In late February and early March 2001, Polgár played in the elite Linares double round-robin invitational of six of the world's strongest players. The tournament was Kasparov's triumph as he scored 7½ points in 10 games. The other five participants, Polgár, Karpov, Shirov, Grischuk and Lékó all finished with 4½ for second and last position. However, Polgár drew both her games with Kasparov, the first time in her career she had done this under tournament time controls. In March 2001, she reached the semifinals of the World Cup rapid play tournament in Cannes. She made it to the final four from the 16 grandmasters in the tournament. She lost the semifinal match to Evgeny Bareev, who in turn lost to Kasparov. In a quarterfinal playoff blitz game, she forced Joël Lautier, France's strongest player, to resign in 12 moves when she won his queen which resulted in the audience of several hundred bursting into applause. In June 2001, Polgár finished fourth in the European Championship in Ohrid, Macedonia, a 13-round Swiss-system tournament of 143 Grandmasters and 38 IMs. In October 2001, she tied for first with GM Loek van Wely in the Essent Tourney in Hoogeveen, the Netherlands.

In September 2002, in the Russia versus the Rest of the World Match, Polgár finally defeated Garry Kasparov in a game. The tournament was played under rapid rules with 25 minutes per game and a 10-second bonus increment per move. She won the game with exceptional positional play. Kasparov with black chose the Berlin Defence instead of his usual Sicilian, and Polgár proceeded with a line which Kasparov had used himself. Polgár was able to attack Kasparov's king (which was still in the centre of the board) with her rooks, and when he was two pawns down, Kasparov resigned. The game helped the World team win the match 52–48. Upon resigning, Kasparov immediately left by a passageway barred to journalists and photographers. Kasparov had once described Polgár as a "circus puppet" and asserted that women chess players should stick to having children. Polgár called the game "one of the most remarkable moments of [her] career". The game was historic as it was the first time in chess history that a female player beat the world's No. 1 player in competitive play. An interview with Polgár including video of the match was included in the BBC Witness radio program in 2016.

In October and November 2002, Polgár played on second board (with Péter Lékó on first) for Hungary in the 35th Chess Olympiad. While not having the stunning performance as she had in the 2000 Olympiad, she helped Hungary attain the silver medal for the event. While the Hungarians had the best win–loss record of the tournament as a team and lost only a single game of the 56 they played, they had won most of their matches by 2½–1½ scores, while the Russian team won gold as they piled up the points. However, Hungary gave the gold-winning Russian team its only defeat. Polgár's fourth-round game against Azerbaijan's Shakhriyar Mamedyarov included a brilliant 12.Nxf7, drawing his king into the center of the board.

By early 2003, Polgár had worked her way back into the top 10 rated players in the world. In 2003, Polgár scored one of her best results: an undefeated clear second place in the Category XIX Corus chess tournament in Wijk aan Zee, Netherlands, just a half-point behind future world champion Viswanathan Anand and a full point ahead of then-world champion Vladimir Kramnik. One of the highlight games of the tournament was Polgár's fourth round crushing victory over Anatoly Karpov. She played a novelty in the opening which she devised over the board. The game lasted 33 moves with Karpov down two pawns and his king exposed. Polgár admitted to "enjoying herself" by the end of the game. In April 2003, Polgár finished second in The Hunguest Hotels Super Tournament in Budapest behind Nigel Short. She appeared headed for a first-place victory in the tournament, but lost her game against compatriot Péter Lékó. In June 2003, Polgár finished tied for third with Boris Gelfand, in the Enghien-les-Bains International Tournament in France, scoring 5½–3½, behind Evgeny Bareev who won the tournament and GM Michael Adams. In August 2003, Polgár played an eight-game rapid chess match in Mainz, Germany, against Viswanathan Anand, billed as the "Battle of the Sexes". After six games, each player had won three games. Anand won the final two games to win the match. In October 2003, Polgár won the 4–grandmaster Essent tournament in Hoogeveen, Netherlands. In one of her games against Karpov, he blundered, allowing Polgár to utilize a famous double bishop sacrifice first employed by Emanuel Lasker against Bauer in 1889.

=== Balancing chess and family ===
In 2004, Polgár took some time off from chess to give birth to her son, Olivér. She was consequently considered inactive and not listed on the January 2005 FIDE rating list. Her sister Susan reactivated her playing status during this period and temporarily became the world's No. 1 ranked female player again.

Polgár returned to chess at the prestigious Corus chess tournament on 15 January 2005. The tournament, which was now considered by some as the most important in Europe, was won by fellow Hungarian Péter Lékó while Polgár scored 7/13 to tie for fourth with Alexander Grischuk, Michael Adams and Kramnik. She was therefore relisted in the April 2005 FIDE rating list, gaining a few rating points for her better-than-par performance at Corus. In May she also had a better-than-par performance at a strong tournament in Sofia, Bulgaria, finishing third. This brought her to her highest ever rating, 2735, in the July 2005 FIDE list and enabled her to retain her spot as the eighth ranked player in the world.

In September 2005, Polgár once again made history as she became the first woman to play in the final stages of a World Chess Championship, at the FIDE World Chess Championship 2005. She had previously participated in large, 100+ player knockout tournaments for the FIDE world championship, but this was a small 8-player double-round-robin, and she qualified on rating. However, she performed relatively poorly, coming last of the eight competitors.

She did not play at the 2006 Linares tournament because she was pregnant again. On 6 July 2006, she gave birth to a girl, Hanna.

Polgár participated in the FIDE world blitz championship on 5–7 September 2006 in Rishon Le Zion, Israel. Blitz chess is played with each player having only 5 minutes for all moves. The round-robin tournament of 16 of some of the strongest players in the world, concluded with Alexander Grischuk finally edging out Peter Svidler in a tie-break to win the tournament. Polgár finished tied for fifth/sixth place, winning $5,625 for the three-day tournament. Polgár tied with Boris Gelfand with 9½ points and won her individual game against Viswanathan Anand, at the time the world's No. 2 player. In October 2006, Polgár scored another excellent result: tied for first place in the Essent Chess Tournament, Hoogeveen, the Netherlands. She scored 4½ out of 6 in a double round-robin tournament that included two wins against the world's top-rated player, Veselin Topalov. In December 2006, Polgár played a six-game match of blindfold rapid chess against former FIDE world champion Veselin Topalov. Topalov won the match 3½–2½ with two wins to Polgár's one. Nearly 1,000 spectators attended the event.

In May–June 2007 she played in the Candidates Tournament for the FIDE World Chess Championship 2007. She was eliminated in the first round, losing 3½–2½ to Evgeny Bareev. Some chess pundits said she was "poorly prepared" for the tournament; she had played less chess in the last three years as she gave birth to her two children. However, she was still credited with the most beautiful attack of the tournament in her fifth game victory. In July 2007, Polgár played in the Biel Chess Festival which was won by 16-year-old Magnus Carlsen. Polgár finished the 9 round tournament at 5–4 in a four-way tie for third to sixth place. A highlight game for her was actually a draw. Polgár was playing an endgame of knight against knight and two connected passed pawns of Alexander Grischuk, but she was able to eliminate both pawns. In October 2007, Polgár played in the Blindfold World Cup in Bilbao, Spain. Polgár finished in fourth place of the six players with three wins, four losses, and three draws. The tournament was won by Bu Xiangzhi of China, whose only loss was to Polgár. In November 2007, she took part in Chess Champions League – Playing for a Better World in Vitoria Gasteiz, Spain a tournament to raise funds for equipment for a Hospital in Mbuji-Mayi, DR Congo. Polgár finished tied for third in the strong six-player tournament and handed tournament winner Veselin Topalov his only loss.

In January 2008 she competed in the strong Corus Wijk aan Zee tournament, scoring a respectable 6/13 and tied 9–11 in the 14 player tournament. In November 2008, Polgár had a terrible result in The World Chess Blitz Championship in Almaty, Republic of Kazakhstan, finished last of the 16 players with only 2½ points. In November 2008, Polgár played the number 2 board for the Hungarian open ("men's") team in the 38th Chess Olympiad in Dresden, finishing 3½/8.

In November 2009, Polgár participated in the FIDE World Cup at Khanty Mansiysk in Siberia. Polgár made it to the third round of the knockout tournament until she was eliminated by tournament winner Boris Gelfand. She handed Gelfand his only loss of the tournament.

=== Return to competition ===
In 2010, Polgár began her return to competitive chess and would play more than she had in recent years. In March 2010, Polgár played a four-game match against GM Gregory Kaidanov at Hilton Head, South Carolina. It was required that each game begin with the Sicilian Defense. The match was drawn with each player winning two games. In April 2010, Polgár played an eight-game rapid chess match against Czech GM David Navara which was part of the ČEZ Chess Trophy 2010 festival of the Prague Chess Society. Despite slightly higher ranking, 2708 to Polgár's 2682, Navara lost the match 6–2. Polgár participated in the rapid chess tournament of the Presidential Chess Cup in Baku, Azerbaijan from 29 April to 1 May 2010. She finished with one win, two losses and four draws, tied for fifth position in the eight-player round robin. The tournament finished with a three-way tie for first with the winner, Kramnik, being decided by Elo over Mamedyarov and Kamsky. In June 2010, it was reported Polgár was assisting GM Zoltán Almási in training for the Olympiad.

In September and October 2010, Polgár played 3rd board for the Hungarian Men's team in the 39th Chess Olympiad in Khanty-Mansiysk, Russia. The team finished in fourth place, losing the Bronze medal to Israel on tie-break. Playing more in 2010 than in recent years, Polgár finished fourth overall among Board three players with a 6/10 score. The highlight for the Hungarian Men's team was a fifth-round victory over Russia I. In November 2010, Polgár won the four-player rapid tournament which was held to celebrate the National University of Mexico's 100th anniversary. Polgár won a close opening match against Vassily Ivanchuk. She then crushed Veselin Topalov, a former world champion and ranked No. 1 in the world in 2009, 3½–½ to win the tournament.

Polgár vs. Edouard,
European Ch., Aix-les-Bains 2011

Position: d8 black rook, h8 black king, f7 white rook, d6 black pawn, g6 black pawn, h6 black pawn, d5 white bishop, e5 black pawn, g5 white pawn, c4 white pawn, h4 white pawn, d2 black bishop, f2 white pawn, g2 white king

Position after 35...h6. In an apparent draw, Polgár finds the winning move: 36.h5! threatening to place a pawn on g6. The game continued: 36...Rg8 37.Rd7 Rg7 38.Bf7 1–0

On 2 April 2011, Polgár finished in a four-way tie for first in the European Individual Chess Championship in Aix-les-Bains, France. The tournament, featuring 393 players of which 167 were Grandmasters, was won by Russian Vladimir Potkin on tie-break; GM Radosław Wojtaszek won the silver, while Polgár placed third, winning the bronze. Polgár was praised for her creative attacks and endgame technique. Polgár became the first woman ever to finish in the top three of the male championship. Continuing Polgár's return to competitive chess, in July 2011 she participated in the 39th Greek Team National Championship, scoring 3½ out of 4 games. Also in July 2011, Polgár played Board 3 for Hungary in the World Team Championships. Hungary finished in fifth place of the ten teams and individually Polgár finished sixteenth of the fifty players.

In September 2011, Polgár competed in the Chess World Cup, a 128-player tournament with a large prize fund and qualification to the top three for the World Championship cycle. Polgár made it to the final 8 players before she was eliminated by Peter Svidler. A highlight for Polgár was her elimination of the tournament's No. 1 seed and world's fifth highest rated player, Sergey Karjakin. In October 2011, Polgár took part in the Unive 2011 competition. She finished last in the elite four-player Crown group, losing games to Vladimir Kramnik and Anish Giri.

In September 2011, Polgár finally returned to "Super GM" status with a FIDE rating of 2701 and by November she had raised it to 2710 and ranked 35 in the world.

To begin 2012, in January Polgár competed in the Tradewise Gibraltar tournament, finishing with 7 points in 10 games. For the first time in 22 years since she lost to Nona Gaprindashvili in the 1990 Chess Olympiad, Polgár lost a classical game to a female player as Women's World champion Hou Yifan won their individual game and tied for first before losing the playoff to Nigel Short. In 2013, Polgár received the FIDE Caïssa Award, as Polgár was considered the best female player of 2012. This award, designed and executed by artisans of the Lobortas Classic Jewelry House, was presented on 2 October 2013 during the 84th FIDE Congress in Tallinn.

On 5 October 2013, Polgár played Nigel Short in the eighteenth edition of Chess.com's Death Match. The final score was 17½-10½ in Polgár's favour. They played 28 games in total, separated into three stages of increasingly faster time controls, the first being 5+1, the second 3+1 and finally 1+1. Polgár later remarked on her Facebook page that "it was great fun to play against Nigel..." Nigel in turn tweeted in jest, "Such bad chess. I should go and hang myself..."

In 2014, in the World Rapid and Blitz Chess Championship, she came 26th in the Blitz championship and 56th in the Rapid championship.

On 13 August 2014, she announced in the London newspaper The Times her retirement from chess at the highest level.

== Playing style ==
While having a strong understanding of positional play, Polgár excels in tactics and is known for an aggressive playing style, striving to maximize the initiative and actively pursuing complications. The former world champion Garry Kasparov wrote that, based upon her games, "if to 'play like a girl' meant anything in chess, it would mean relentless aggression." In her youth, she was especially popular with chess fans due to her willingness to employ wild gambits and attacks. As a teenager, Polgár has been credited with contributing to the popularity of the opening variation King's Bishop's Gambit. Polgár prefers aggressive openings, playing 1.e4 as White and the Sicilian or King's Indian Defence with black, but she has also said her opening choices will also depend upon her trainer. Jennifer Shahade, writer and two-time U.S. women's chess champion, suggested that the influence of Polgár as a role model may be one of the reasons women play more aggressive chess than men. Describing an individual encounter with Polgár, former U.S. Champion Joel Benjamin said, "It was all-out war for five hours. I was totally exhausted. She is a tiger at the chessboard. She absolutely has a killer instinct. You make one mistake and she goes right for the throat."

Polgár is especially adept at faster time controls. When she was still young, Der Spiegel wrote of her, "her tactical thunderstorms during blitz games have confounded many opponents, who are rated higher."

Polgár has spoken of appreciating the psychological aspect of chess. She has stated preferring to learn an opponent's style so she can play intentionally against that player rather than playing "objective" chess. In her 2002 victory (at 25 minutes time control) over Kasparov, she deliberately chose a line Kasparov had used against Vladimir Kramnik, employing the strategy of forcing the opponent to "play against himself". Kasparov's response was inadequate and he soon found himself in an inferior position. In an interview regarding playing against computers she said, "Chess is 30 to 40% psychology. You don't have this when you play a computer. I can't confuse it."

== Chess professional ==
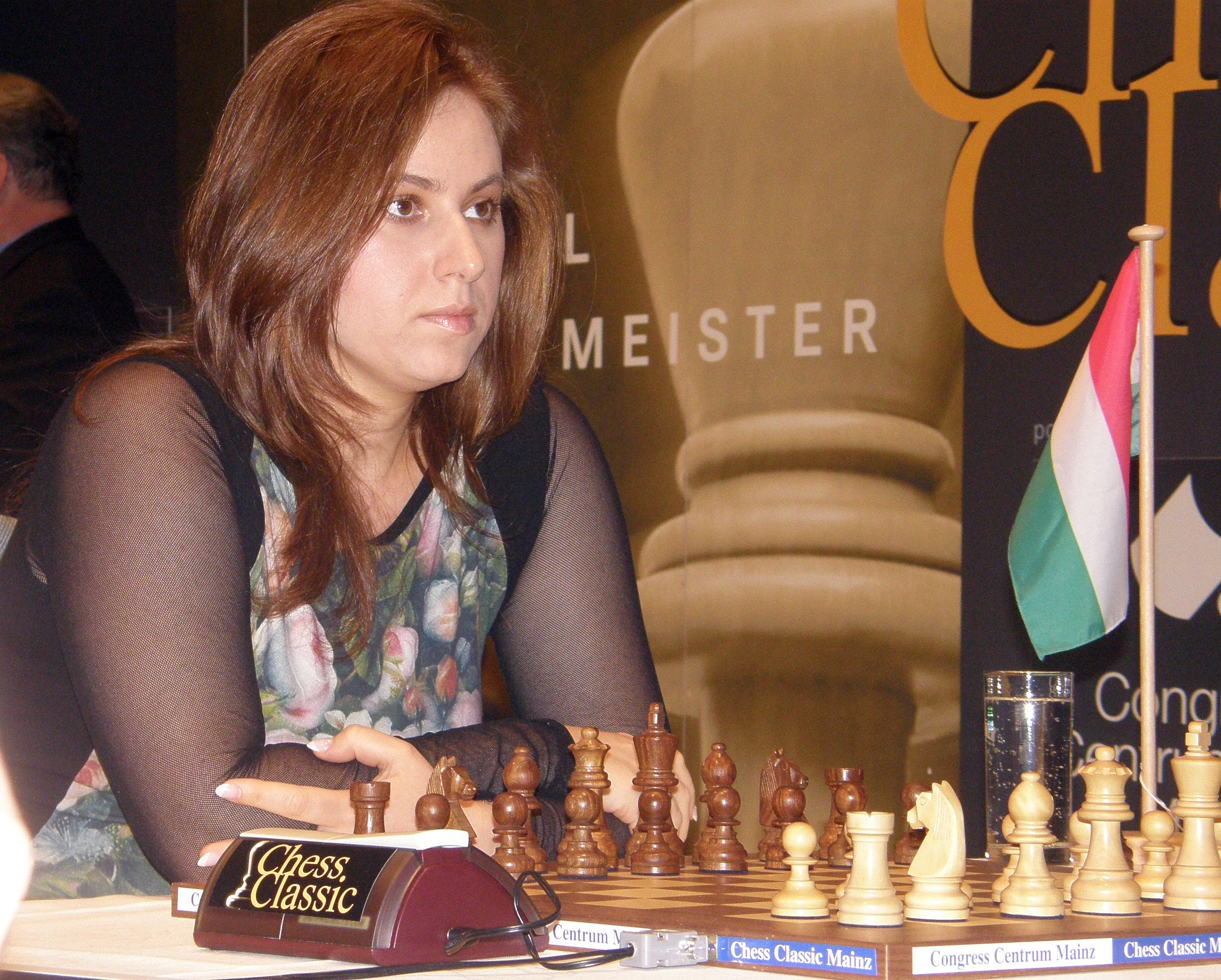
Polgár at the 2008 Mainz Chess Classic

"You have to be very selfish sometimes", said Polgár in speaking of the life of a professional chess player. "If you are in a tournament, you have to think of yourself—you can't think of your wife or children—only about yourself." When asked in 2002 if she still desired to win the world championship she said, "Chess is my profession and of course I hope to improve. But I'm not going to give up everything to become world champion; I have my life."

Polgár said she did not have a permanent coach, although she had help from GM Lev Psakhis or GM Mihail Marin. She said she rarely used a second and when she traveled to tournaments, it was usually her husband who accompanied her. Polgár said she changed how she prepared for tournaments. "I make more use of my experience now and try to work more efficiently so that my efforts aren't wasted", she said in 2008.

Concentrating on her two children left Polgár with little time to train and play competitively and her ranking dropped from eighth in 2005 to the mid 50s in 2009. She played in the 2009 Maccabiah Games in Israel and was named the Outstanding Female Athlete of the Games. Polgár remained the only woman in the top 100 until Hou Yifan reached rank 86 in August 2014, just before Polgár played her last rated game in September 2014 and dropped off the top 100 list due to inactivity a year later. Comparing motherhood to playing chess, Polgár has said that a chess tournament now "feels like a vacation". When asked why she came back to chess after taking time off to care for her children, she said, "I cannot live without chess! It is an integral part of my life. I enjoy the game!"

Despite being the highest-rated woman for twenty-five years, Polgár never competed for the women's world championship. In a 2011 interview she was asked about this possibility. Polgár said that in the past she has never been interested in competing for it, but in recent years "the mentality of a couple of the women players has changed". Polgár said that for her to consider competing it would have to be a challenge and "if I get an extremely nice offer just to play for the title".

Polgár authored a series of children's books on chess, Chess Playground. Her sister Sofia provided illustrations.

In March 2013 she was awarded the Commander's Cross with Star of The Hungarian Order of Merit, one of Hungary's highest awards, "for her worldwide acknowledged life achievement as an athlete, for promoting the game of chess and for her efforts to promote the educational benefits of chess". In August 2015, she received The Hungarian Order of Saint Stephen, the highest state Order of Hungary.

== Personal life ==
In August 2000, Polgár married Hungarian veterinary surgeon Gusztáv Font. They have two children, a boy named Olivér (born 2004) and a girl named Hanna (born 2006). While Judit remained in Hungary, her sisters and parents eventually emigrated: Sofia to Israel, Susan to the United States, and her parents to Israel and the United States.

Several members of Polgár's family were murdered in the Holocaust; her grandmother was a survivor of Auschwitz concentration camp.

In July 2026, Prime Minister Péter Magyar asked Judit Polgár to become Hungary's ‌next President after the removal of Tamás Sulyok, saying that Polgár could represent the nation's unity. Polgár declined, saying "I do not feel I have enough strength within myself to take on the historic responsibility of uniting a divided nation."

== Notable games ==
- Judit Polgár vs. Viswanathan Anand, Dos Hermanas 1999 · Sicilian Defense: Scheveningen Variation. Delayed Keres Attack Perenyi Gambit (B90) · 1–0 Former trainer for the Polgárs, IM Tibor Károlyi, called this the most beautiful game ever played by a woman.
- Judit Polgár vs. Ferenc Berkes, Hunguest Hotels Super Chess Tournament 2003 · French Defense: Classical. Burn Variation Main Line (C11) · 1–0 Polgár's opponent falls for a clever trap, expecting her to play 14.Bxa8 and he would reply with 14...g4!, but she springs 14.g4!!
- Alexey Shirov vs. Judit Polgár, Buenos Aires ARG 1994 · Sicilian Defense: Paulsen. Normal Variation (B45) · 0–1 Polgár uses a novelty to break up Shirov's pawn front. She used only 48 minutes to win this game.
- Judit Polgár vs. Nigel Short, 1994 New York PCA/Intel-GP Rapid knockout tournament. 1–0. In the Steinitz variation of the French Defense, Short seemingly has a crushing attack in the opening, sending Polgár's king on a walk. However, Short's attack runs out of steam, and Polgár recovers quickly, leaving Short's pieces constricted and his own king exposed.
- Judit Polgár vs. Garry Kasparov, Russia vs. The Rest of the World match, Moscow 2002 · Spanish Game: Berlin Defense. l'Hermet Variation (C67) · 1–0 Polgár makes history when, for the first time ever, a woman defeats the world's No. 1 chess player in a game.

== Judit Polgar Chess Foundation ==
The Judit Polgar Chess Foundation developed two educational programs. One is Chess Palace for primary school children (grades 1–4) and the other one is Chess Playground for pre-school children. The aim is to improve various skills (problem solving, strategical thinking, etc.) with the help of chess. The systematic rules of chess are used to process the knowledge of general subjects as well (math, language, etc.). The program is very successful in Hungary and it is part of the Hungarian National Curriculum. At the 2015 Frankfurt Book Fair the Chess Palace book series received the special prize of the Best European Learning Materials Awards (BELMA).

== Books ==
- Judit Polgar: How I Beat Fischer's Record (in English, German, French, Hungarian)
- Judit Polgar: From GM to Top Ten (in English, German, French, Hungarian)
- Judit Polgar: A Game of Queens (in English, German, French, Hungarian)

Educational chess exercise books for pre-school children and methodological resources for teachers (in Hungarian):

- Kalandozások a sakktáblán (Adventures on the Chessboard)
- Sakklépések (Chess Moves)
- Sakk és matt (Check and Mate)

Educational chess books, and exercise books for elementary school children and methodological resources for teachers (in Hungarian):

- Sakkpalota (Chess Palace), series 1–4.

== Awards ==
- Hungarian Chess Player of the Year (in 1989, 1991, 1993, 1994, 1998–2003, 2005–2012, and 2014)
- 8-time Chess Oscar winner – for annual performance: in 1988, 1995, 1996, 2000, 2001, and 2002 Female Chess Player of the Century: 2001
- FIDE Caissa Award (the newly established "Chess Oscar"): 2012
- The Knight's Cross of the Order of Merit of the Republic of Hungary (Budapest, 2003)
- The Commander's Cross with Star of the Hungarian Order of Merit (Budapest, 2013)
- Prima Primissima (Budapest, 2014)
- a Member of the Association of Immortal Hungarian Athletes (Budapest, 2014)
- The Hungarian Order of St. Stephen (Budapest, 2015)
- Best European Learning Materials Award – for the Chess Palace Program (Frankfurt, 2015)
- Honorary Citizen of Budapest (Budapest, 2016)
- James Joyce Award from the UCD Literary & Historical Society (Dublin 2017)
- ECU European Golden Pawn, "European Chess Legend" (Monte Carlo, 2019)
- Honorary Doctor of the University of Physical Education (Budapest, 2020)
- Inducted into the World Chess Hall of Fame (Saint Louis, 2021)
- FIDE ICON Award (Chennai, 2022)
- FIDE100 Award, Best Player – Woman (Budapest, 2024), Best Female Chess Player of All Time

== See also ==
- List of Jewish chess players

== Literature ==
- Forbes, Cathy (1992), The Polgar Sisters: Training or Genius?, Henry Holt & Co., ISBN 0-8050-2426-3
- Hurst, Sarah (2002), Curse of Kirsan: Adventures in the Chess Underworld, Russell Enterprises, ISBN 1-888690-15-1
- Karolyi, Tibor (2004), Judit Polgár, the Princess of Chess, Batsford, ISBN 0-7134-8890-5
- Polgar, Susan; Truong, Paul (2005), Breaking Through : How the Polgar Sisters Changed the Game of Chess, Everyman Chess, ISBN 1-85744-381-0
- Shahade, Jennifer (2005), Chess Bitch: Women In The Ultimate Intellectual Sport, Siles Press, ISBN 1-890085-09-X
- Polgár, Judit; Kepes, András (2008). Matt a férfiaknak (Checkmate to Men) English translation due 2009.
- Polgar, Judit (2010), Chess Playground, Caissa Hungary, ISBN 978-963-06-9620-3

Achievements
Preceded by Bobby Fischer	Youngest chess grandmaster ever 1991–1994	Succeeded by Peter Leko
