= László Polgár =

Hungarian chess teacher

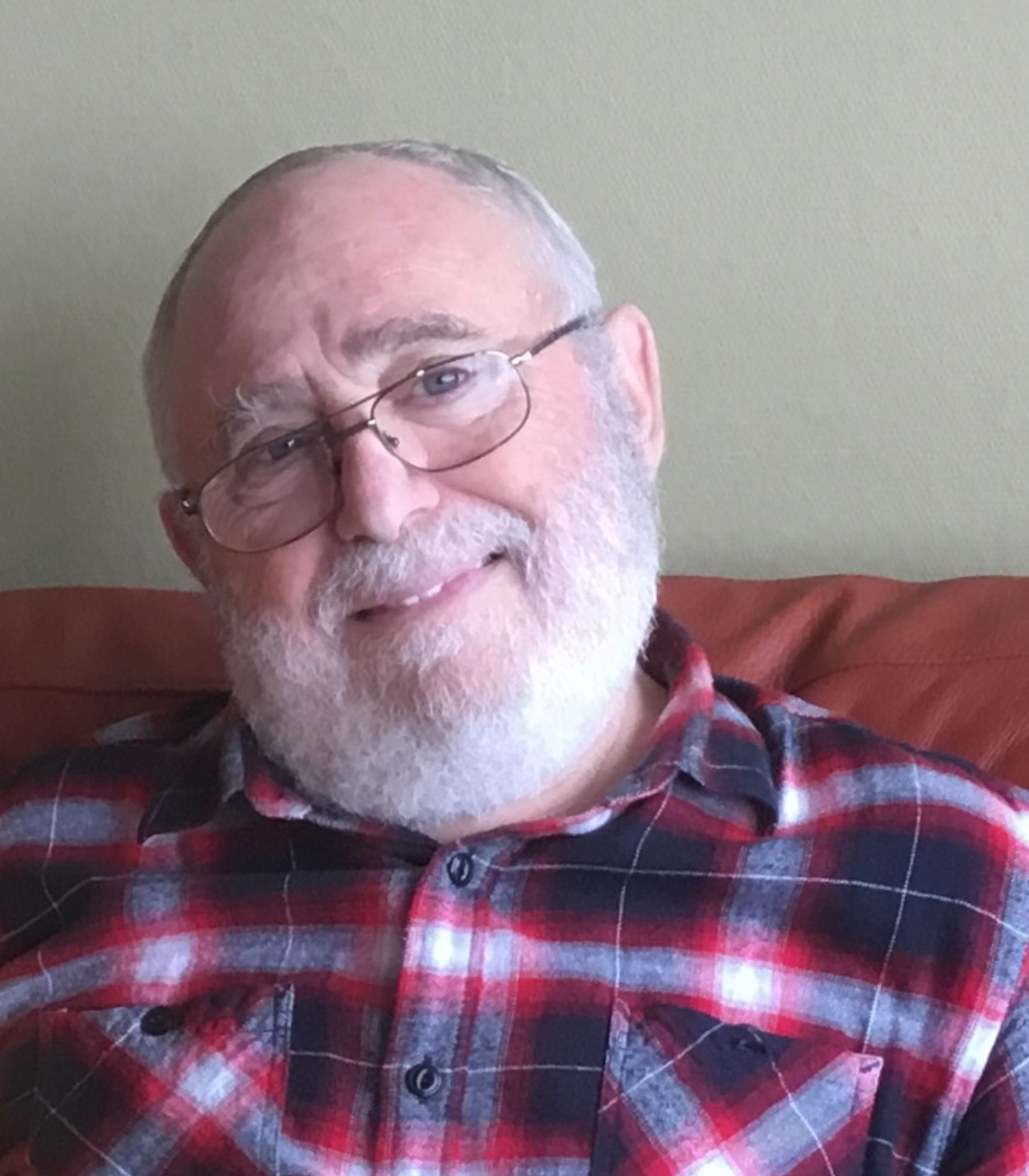
- Polgár in 2016
- Born: 11 May 1946 (age 80); Gyöngyös, Hungary
- Citizenship: Hungary; Israel
- Spouse: Klára Polgár
- Children: Zsuzsanna; Zsófia; Judit

László Polgár (born 11 May 1946) is a Hungarian chess teacher and educational psychologist. He is the father of the famous Polgár sisters: Zsuzsa, Zsófia, and Judit, whom he raised to be chess prodigies, with Judit and Zsuzsa becoming the best and second-best female chess players in the world, respectively. Judit is widely considered the greatest female chess player ever, as she is the only woman to have been ranked in the top 10 worldwide, while Zsuzsa became the Women's World Chess Champion.

He has written well-known chess books such as Chess: 5334 Problems, Combinations, and Games and Reform Chess, a survey of chess variants. He is also considered a pioneer theorist in child-rearing, who believes "geniuses are made, not born". Polgár's experiment with his daughters has been called "one of the most amazing experiments…in the history of human education." He has been "portrayed by his detractors as a Dr. Frankenstein" and viewed by his admirers as "a Houdini", noted Peter Maas in the Washington Post in 1992.

== Education and career ==
Polgár was born on 11 May 1946 in Gyöngyös, Hungary. He studied intelligence when he was a university student. He later recalled that "when I looked at the life stories of geniuses" during his student years, "I found the same thing...They all started at a very young age and studied intensively." He prepared for fatherhood before marriage, reported People Magazine in 1987, by studying the biographies of 400 great intellectuals, from Socrates to Einstein. He concluded that if he took the right approach to child-rearing, he could turn "any healthy newborn" into "a genius." In 1992, Polgár told the Washington Post: "A genius is not born but is educated and trained….When a child is born healthy, it is a potential genius."

In 1965, Polgár "conducted an epistolary courtship with a Ukrainian foreign language teacher named Klara." In his letters, he outlined the pedagogical project he had in mind. In reading those biographies, he had "identified a common theme—early and intensive specialization in a particular subject." Confident that "he could turn any healthy child into a prodigy," he "needed a wife willing to jump on board."

=== Polgár sisters ===
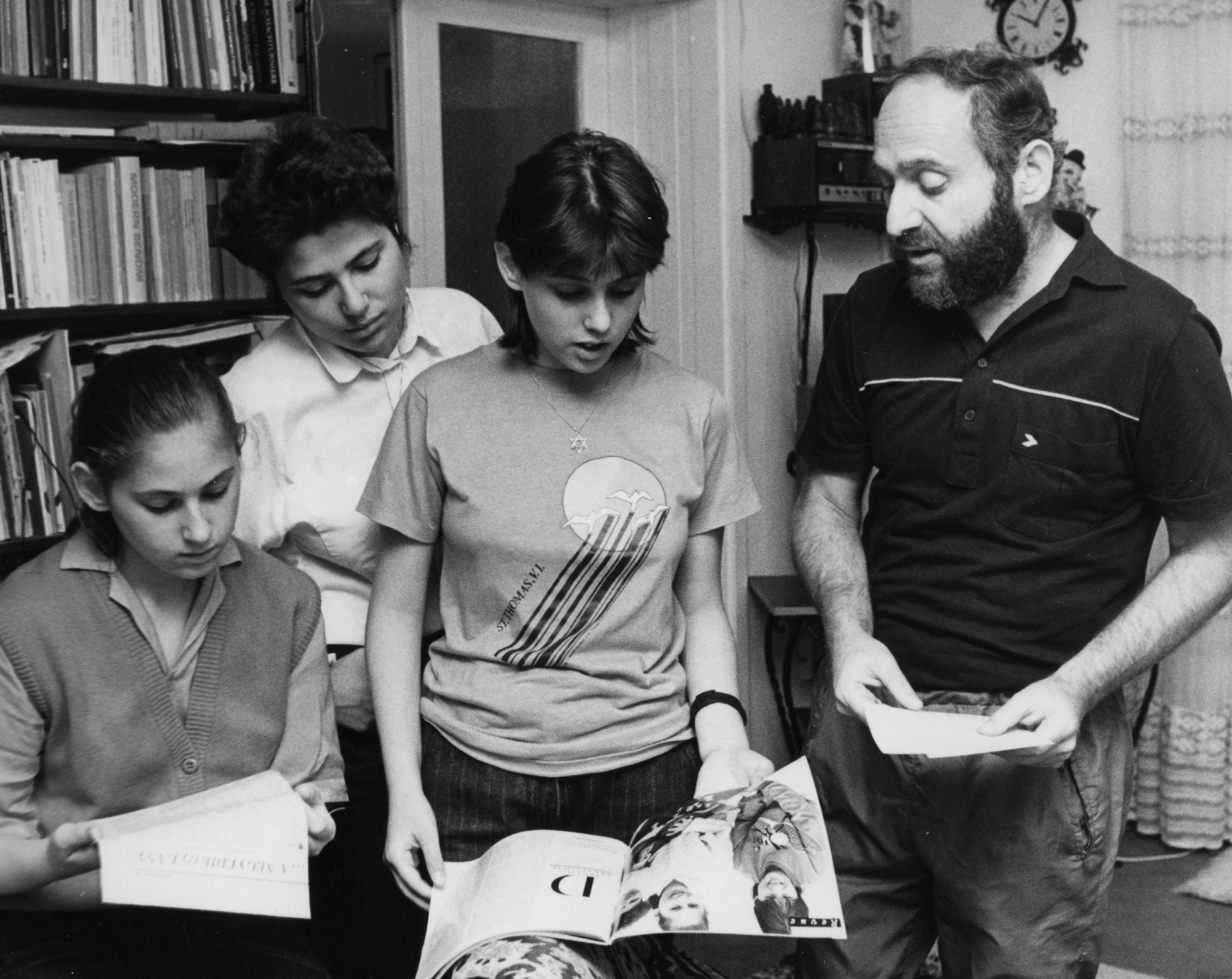
Judit, Zsuzsa, Zsófia and László Polgár

He and Klara married in the USSR, whereupon she moved to Hungary to be with him. They had three daughters together, Susan, Sofia, and Judit, whom Polgár home-schooled, primarily in chess but also in Esperanto, German, Russian, English, and high-level math. Polgár and his wife considered various possible subjects in which to drill their children, "including mathematics and foreign languages", but they settled on chess. "We could do the same thing with any subject, if you start early, spend lots of time and give great love to that one subject," Klara later explained. "But we chose chess. Chess is very objective and easy to measure." His eldest daughter Susan described chess as her choice: "Yes, he could have put us in any field, but it was I who chose chess as a four-year-old... I liked the chessmen; they were toys for me."

The experiment began in 1970 "with a simple premise: that any child has the innate capacity to become a genius in any chosen field, as long as education starts before their third birthday and they begin to specialize at six." Polgár "battled Hungarian authorities for permission" to home-school the girls. "We didn't go to school, which was very unusual at the time," his youngest daughter Judit recalled in 2008. "People would say, 'The parents are destroying them, they have to work all day, they have no childhood'. I became defensive, and not very sociable."

The family lived "in a modest apartment in the heart of Budapest" in which the "narrow living room" was "cluttered with chess books" and one wall was "lined with sketches of chess scenes from centuries ago." One account described it as "a shrine to unremitting chess practice. Thousands of chess books were stuffed onto shelves. Trophies and boards cluttered the living room. A file card system took up an entire wall. It included records of previous games for endless analytical pleasure and even an index of potential competitors' tournament histories."

Polgár began teaching his eldest daughter, Susan, to play chess when she was four years old. "Six months later, Susan toddled into Budapest's smoke-filled chess club," which was crowded with elderly men, and proceeded to beat the veteran players. "Soon thereafter, she dominated the city's girls-under-age-11 tournament with a perfect score." Judit was able to defeat her father at chess when she was just five. "For me, learning chess was natural; with my sisters around me, I wanted to play," said Judit in 2008. The family, she noted, had been the target of "some vicious anti-Semitism" during the girls' childhood. At age 12, she "got a letter, with a picture of my father with his eyes [gouged] out; and very nasty words." Largely because of the anti-Semitism and criticism they endured, there was "no jealousy" among the sisters; Judit said in 2008 that these challenges "kept us bound together."

In 2012, Judit told an interviewer about the "very special atmosphere" in which she had grown up. "In the beginning, it was a game. My father and mother are exceptional pedagogues who can motivate and tell it from all different angles. Later, chess for me became a sport, an art, a science, everything together. I was very focused on chess and happy with that world. I was not the rebelling and going out type. I was happy that at home we were in a closed circle and then we went out playing chess and saw the world. It's a very difficult life and you have to be very careful, especially the parents, who need to know the limits of what you can and can't do with your child. My parents spent most of their time with us; they traveled with us [when we played abroad], and were in control of what was going on. With other prodigies, it might be different. It is very fragile. But I'm happy that with me and my sisters it didn't turn out in a bad way." A reporter for The Guardian noted that while "top chess players can be dysfunctional", Judit was "relaxed, approachable and alarmingly well balanced," having managed "to juggle a career in competitive chess with having two young children, running a chess foundation in Hungary, writing books and developing educational programs based on chess."

While Polgár taught the girls the game, Klara took care of the home and later "coordinated their travels to tournaments in 40 countries." His daughter Susan said in a 2005 interview, "My father believes that innate talent is nothing, that [success] is 99 percent hard work." She also described Polgár as "a visionary" who "always thinks big" and who "thinks people can do a lot more than they actually do." Although Polgár was criticized in some quarters for encouraging his daughters to focus intensely on chess, the girls later said they had enjoyed it all. Polgár "once found Sophia in the bathroom in the middle of the night, a chessboard balanced across her knees." "Sophia, leave the pieces alone!" he told her. "Daddy, they won't leave me alone!" she replied.

Polgár's daughters all became excellent chess players. Still, Sophia, the least successful of the three, who became the sixth-best female player in the world, quit playing, studied painting and interior design, and focused on being a housewife and mother. Judit has been described as "without a doubt, the best female chess player the world has ever seen." As of 2008, she had been "the world's highest-ranked female chess player for nearly 20 years." Susan, who became second-best female chess player in the world, was, at age 17, the first woman ever to qualify for what was then called the 'Men's World Championship', but the world chess federation, FIDE, would not allow her to participate.

=== Later life ===
In 1992, Polgár said that he now wanted "to break the racial barriers in the virtually all-white chess world" by adopting "a black infant from the Third World" whom he would train to become a chess prodigy. Susan recalled in 2005 that, about 15 years earlier, "a very nice Dutch billionaire named Joop van Oosterom" had offered to help Polgár "adopt three boys from a developing country and raise them exactly as they raised us." Polgár, according to Susan, "really wanted to do it, but my mother talked him out of it. She understood that life is not only about chess and that all the rest would fall on her lap."

Interviewed in 1993, Polgár was described by William Hartston as resembling "a disgruntled garden gnome" who replied to questions "in a musical voice, with an evangelical tone and a tendency to stare into space." Hartston said that Polgár wore "the scars of weariness after decades of battling against Hungarian chess organizers who wanted his daughters to play in women's tournaments rather than competing against men, and educational authorities who sent an armed policeman to drag Zsuzsa off to school." Polgár's "formula for happiness," wrote Hartston, "is 'work, love, freedom, and luck'. But the key is hard work because hard work creates luck; work plus luck equals genius; and a genius is more likely to be happy." Hartston noted that because Polgár had ended up fathering three daughters, he had been forced to confront issues of sexual inequality. "Men must be clever and hard," Polgár said. "Women must be beautiful and look after the family. Only then, if they have time, can they be clever." He hoped his experiment would "help to change this prejudice."

Polgár said in 1993: "The problems of cancer and AIDS might be more easily solved if our system were used to educate 1,000 children." In the same year, looking back on Polgár's experiment, Klara said that "everything he promised has happened."

== Books and films about Polgár ==
Geoff Colvin wrote extensively about Polgár's experiment in his 2008 book, Talent is Overrated, as did Frank McNeil in his 2009 book Learning with the Brain in Mind. In 1992, Cathy Forbes published a book entitled The Polgár Sisters: Training or Genius?.

A documentary about Polgár and his experiment was shown on Israel I TV in 2012. Amir Harel, producer of the documentary, said that the story of the Polgárs "touches upon many aspects of life: the educational experiment, the underlying ideology, the heroic fight against the Communist regime, issues pertaining to the equality of the sexes, family relationships, and even love stories. Obviously, the film attempts to decipher the mysterious nature of the father, László Polgár." Filmmaker Yossi Aviram said that "Years of abuse by the authorities and media made the family suspicious" of people who wanted to make a film about them. "What helped me was my love of chess and the fact that I had fallen in love with this family."

An early draft of the screenplay for the film Whiplash featured an extensive discussion of Polgár and his theories on child-rearing.

== Books by Polgár ==
Polgár has written many books on chess. By far the most famous of these is Chess: 5334 Problems, Combinations, and Games, which "includes 5,334 different instructional situations--many taken from real matches--including 306 problems for checkmate in one move, 3,412 mates in two moves, 744 mates in three moves, 600 miniature games, 144 simple endgames, and 128 tournament game combinations, plus solutions, the basic rules of the game and an international bibliography." It has been called "One of the most iconic chess books ever written." In 2023, Zsuzsa Polgár claimed in a Facebook post that "in good part" she had been the author of this book solely attributed to her father.

=== Published works ===
- Nevelj zsenit! (lit. 'Raise a Genius!'), 1989 (ISBN 963-01-9976-9)
- Minichess, 1995 (ISBN 963-450-805-7)
- Chess: 5334 Problems, Combinations, and Games, 1994 (ISBN 1-884822-31-2)
- Chess: Reform Chess, 1997 (ISBN 3-89508-226-0)
- Chess: Middlegames, 1998 (ISBN 3-89508-683-5)
- Chess: Endgames, 1999 (ISBN 3-8290-0507-5)
- Királynők és királyok. Sakk, Szerelem, Szex, 2004 (ISBN 963-216-008-8)
- Salom haver: Zsidó származású magyar sakkozók antológiája, 2004 (ISBN 963-214-570-4)
- PeCHESS ember elCHESSte, 2004 (ISBN 963-86531-1-6)
- Polgar Superstar Chess, 2004 (ISBN 963-216-009-6)
- Polgar Superstar Chess II, 2005 (ISBN 963-86531-4-0)
- I Love Superstar Chess, 2005 (ISBN 963-86738-5-0)
- Hatágú csillag. Sakk, képzőművészet és humor, 2005 (ISBN 963-86531-5-9)
- Biztonság. Sakk és humor, 2005 (ISBN 963-86531-9-1)
- Knight, 2005 (ISBN 963-86738-2-6)
- Queens, 2005 (ISBN 963-86738-0-X)
- Blanka: Miniaturaj ŝakproblemoj (lit. 'White: Miniature Chess Problems'), 2005 (ISBN 963-86531-7-5)
- Sakkmat(t)ek. Sakk, matematika, humor, 2005 (ISBN 963-86531-6-7)
- Eszperantó és sakk (lit. 'Esperanto and Chess'), 2006 (ISBN 963-86738-7-7)
- La ŝtelita stel', 2006 (ISBN 963-87042-0-9)
- Barna Viktor Pályafutásom, 2013 (ISBN 978-963-9807-79-2)

== See also ==
- Boris Sidis – psychologist and social scientist whose educational experiments are credited for the genius of his famous son William James Sidis.
- Leo Wiener – historian, linguist, author, and translator, was a child prodigy himself and educated his son Norbert Wiener employing teaching methods of his own invention.
- Richard Williams – tennis coach and father of Venus and Serena Williams, who devised and successfully executed a childhood plan for his daughters to become star tennis players from a very young age.
- Earl Woods - U.S. Army officer and father of world-renowned golfer Tiger Woods, which he began instruction in when the latter was a toddler.
