= Yona Kosashvili =

Georgian-Israeli chess grandmaster and surgeon (born 1970)

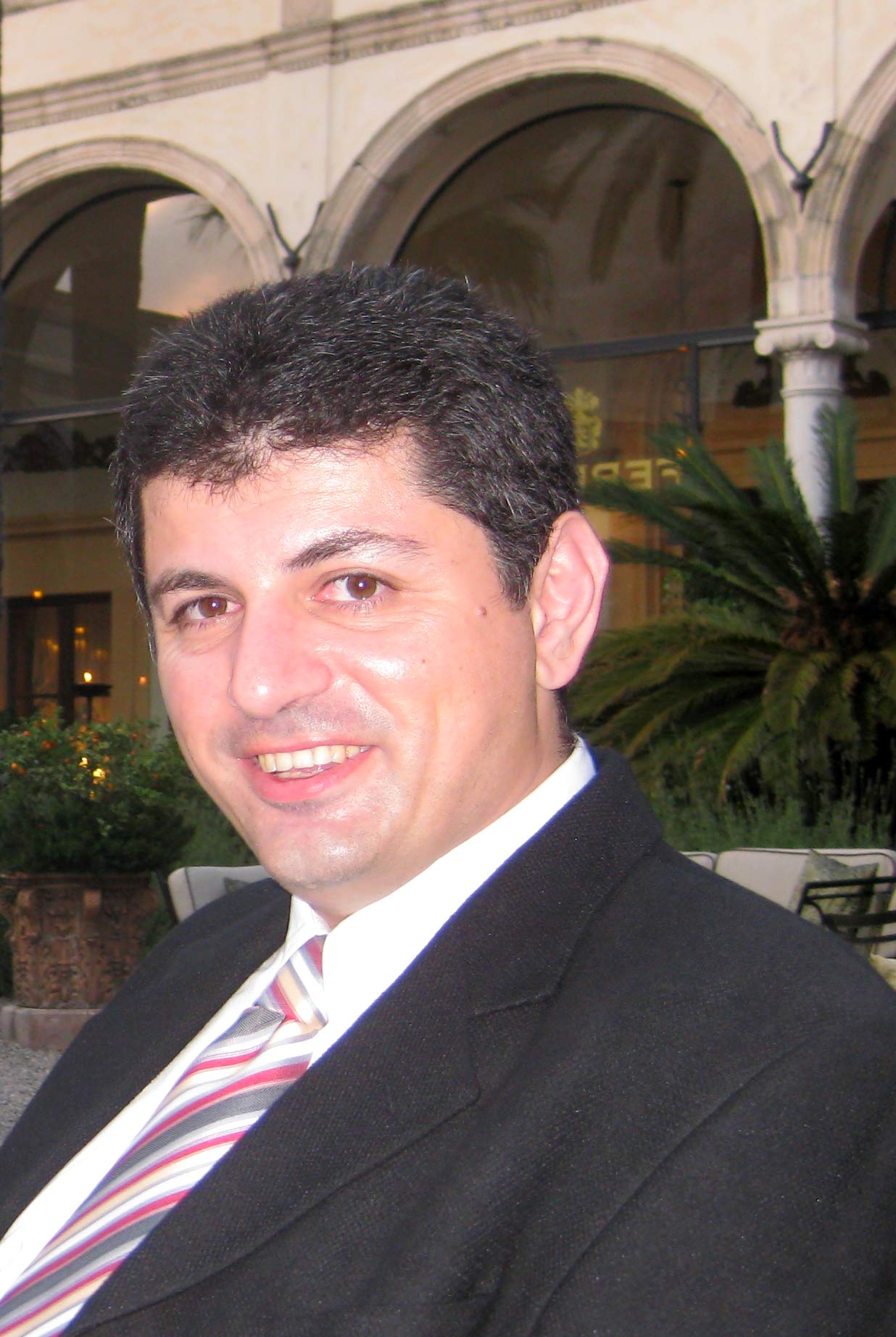

Personal information
- Native name: יונה קוסאשווילי
- Born: July 3, 1970 (age 56) Tbilisi, Georgian SSR
- Spouse: Sofia Polgar (m. 1999)

Chess career
- Country: Israel
- Title: Grandmaster (1994)
- FIDE rating: 2531 (July 2026)
- Peak rating: 2580 (July 1995)

Yona Kosashvili (Hebrew: יונה קוסאשווילי; July 3, 1970) is an Israeli chess Grandmaster and surgeon.

== Personal life ==
Yona Kosashvili was born in Tbilisi, Georgia. He is a graduate of Tel Aviv University in Medicine, as part of the academic reserve Atuda. At the 1990 Israeli Chess Championship, he finished in third place. In 1993, at the age of 23, he received a GM title in chess. Kosashvili previously managed the orthopedic department at Kaplan Medical Center, and currently heads the orthopedic department at Beilinson Hospital. Kosashvili has published about 100 research papers in the field of orthopedics.

In 1999, he married Sofia Polgar. They are the parents of two children. Kosashvili lived with his family for about 3 years in Toronto, Canada, where he worked as an orthopedic surgeon. He currently lives with his family in Ganei Tikva.
