= Sofia Polgar =

Hungarian chess player (born 1974)

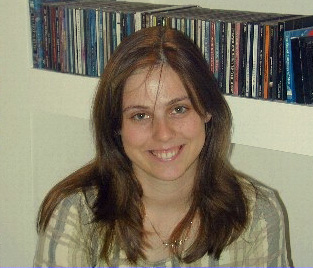
- Polgar in 2004

Personal information
- Native name: Polgár Zsófia סופיה פולגר
- Citizenship: Hungary; Israel
- Born: November 2, 1974 (age 51) Budapest, Hungary
- Spouse: Yona Kosashvili (m. 1999)
- Children: 2
- Parent: László Polgár (father)
- Relatives: Judit Polgár (sister); Susan Polgar (sister)

Chess career
- Country: Hungary
- Title: International Master (1990); Woman Grandmaster (1990)
- FIDE rating: 2450 (September 2026) [inactive]
- Peak rating: 2505 (July 1998)

Sofia Polgar (Note: Hungarian: Polgár Zsófia, pronounced [ˈpolɡaːr ˈʒoːfiɒ]; Hebrew: סופיה פולגר) (born November 2, 1974) (Note: As she uses the anglicized form of her name on her website, it is assumed this is the form she prefers. In Hungarian, she is sometimes known by the familiar form Zsófi.) is a Hungarian-Israeli chess player, teacher, and artist. She holds the FIDE titles of International Master (IM) and Woman Grandmaster (WGM). A former chess prodigy, she is the middle sister of two Grandmasters, Susan and Judit. She has played for Hungary in four Chess Olympiads, winning two team gold medals, one team silver, three individual golds, and one individual bronze.

== Biography ==
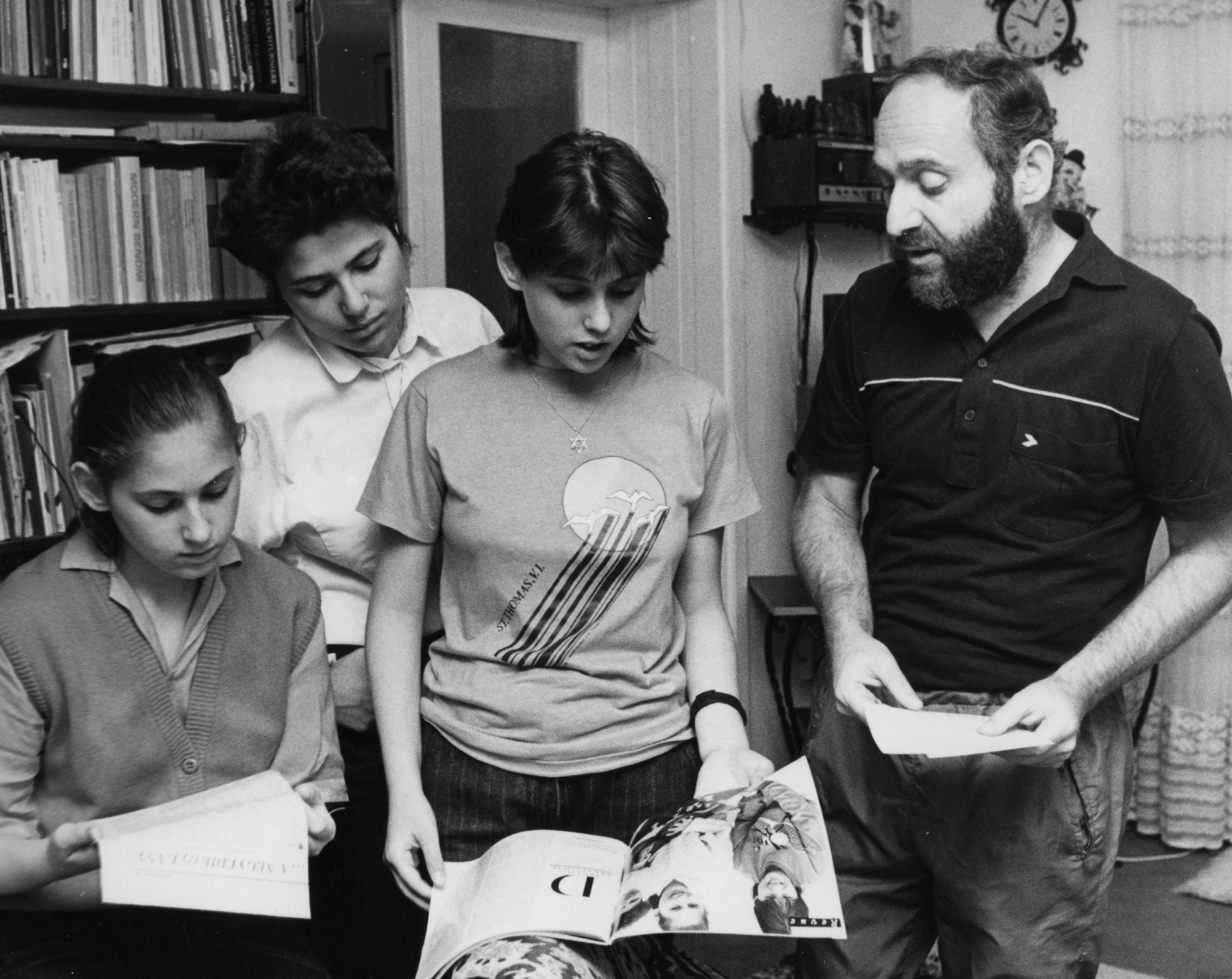
Judit, Zsuzsa, Zsófia (Sofia) and László Polgár, 1989

Polgar was born into a Jewish family in Budapest. She and her two sisters were part of an educational experiment carried out by their father László Polgár, in an attempt to prove that children could attain exceptional achievements if trained in specialist subjects from a very early age—László's thesis being that "geniuses are made, not born". He and his wife Klára educated their three daughters at home, with chess as the specialist subject. They also taught their daughters the international language Esperanto.

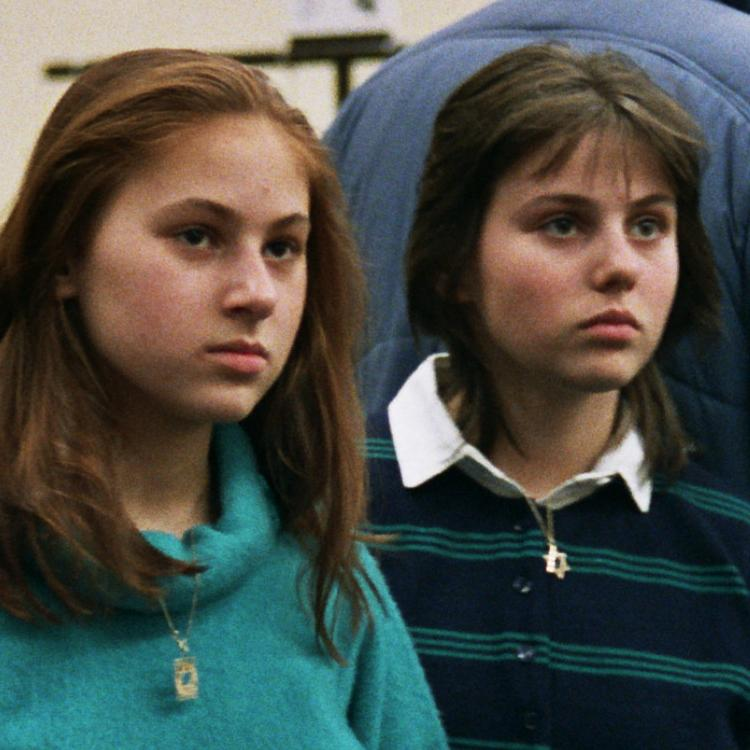
Sofia Polgar (on the right) with her sister Judit in 1988

In the 1986 World under-14 championship she finished second to Joël Lautier and was declared world under-14 girls champion.

In 1989, at the age of 14, she stunned the chess world by her performance in a tournament in Rome, which became known as the "Sack of Rome". She won the tournament, which included several strong grandmasters, with a score of 8½ out of 9. Her performance rating according to New in Chess was 2879, one of the strongest performances in history.

Polgar finished second to Helgi Grétarsson at the World Junior Chess Championship 1994 in Matinhos, Brazil.

She played for the Hungarian team in four chess Olympiads, winning several team and individual medals.

- 1988 Chess Olympiad, (reserve) +3=3–1, team gold
- 1990 Chess Olympiad, (3rd board) +11=1−1, team gold, individual gold
- 1994 Chess Olympiad, (2nd board) +11=3−0, team silver, individual gold, best rating performance
- 1996 Chess Olympiad, (1st board) +7=6−1, individual bronze

For a time, Polgar ranked as the sixth-strongest female player in the world. She has played very little FIDE-rated chess since 2003, and (as of January 2020) none since 2010. At one point she beat Viktor Korchnoi at a game of fast chess.

During the summer of 1993, Bobby Fischer visited László Polgár and his family in Hungary. All of the Polgar sisters (Judit Polgár, Susan Polgar and Sofia Polgar) played many games of Fischer random chess with Fischer. At one point Sofia beat Fischer three games in a row.

== Personal life ==
On February 7, 1999, Polgar married the Israeli Grandmaster Yona Kosashvili and moved to Israel. They have two children, Alon and Yoav. Polgar's parents later joined them in Israel. She and her family lived in Toronto, Ontario, Canada for a while so her husband could pursue his studies and medical specialty. Subsequently, in 2012 they returned to Israel and settled near Tel Aviv.

== Books ==
- The autobiography of Sofia Polgar was published in 2023 by Russell Enterprises. Amazing Artist – Dangerous Tactician is a unique book with the author's selected chess games and chess-themed artwork. She tells her perspective of being brought up in a special family of chess champions. Most illustrations of photos and the paintings are presented in full color and the explanations of the tactics are very instructional for club players. The book includes inside stories about the Polgar Sisters, Viktor Korchnoi and Bobby Fischer.
- My First Chess Club 2020, co-writer with David Cohen. The watercolor illustrations by Sofia invites young readers to the magical world of chess.
- Sofia consulted and illustrated Judit Polgar's Chess Palace book series, which in Frankfurt in 2015 received the special prize of the Best European Learning Materials Awards. These books are successfully used in hundreds of schools in Hungary and are part of the Hungarian National Curriculum. Their aim is to improve various skills: problem solving, strategical thinking, in a more playful manner, with the help of chess.

== See also ==
- List of Jewish chess players
