= Cathy Warwick =

English chess player

Cathy Warwick (née Forbes) (born 6 February 1968) is an English chess player and writer.

She won the British Women's Chess Championship three times, in 1987, 1988 and 1994 and played for the England women's chess team. She was awarded the title of Woman International Master, but resigned it 15 years later in protest at the whole principle of having separate "inferior" women's titles (although she is not in principle opposed to women-only tournaments).

She is also known for her writings on chess. They include the first full-length work on the Polgár sisters, published in 1992 shortly after Judit Polgár broke Bobby Fischer's record as the youngest grandmaster, and a 1993 biography of Nigel Short, a leading British player who was for a time ranked world No. 3. Susan Polgar has said that she was not happy with the former book as Warwick did not interview any of them and included rumour and speculation; however, Polgar added that Warwick has since acknowledged her mistake and she has no hard feelings.

In her role as a chess journalist, Warwick covered the 1992 match between Fischer and Boris Spassky in Yugoslavia. After the part of the match that was played in Sveti Stefan was over, she played a casual game against Fischer on his pocket set. She was also part of Channel 4's coverage of the 1993 World Championship match between Short and Garry Kasparov held in London, and has appeared on the TV quiz show Eggheads.
