= Lobortas Classic Jewelry House =

Ukrainian jewelry company

"Lobortas" Classic Jewelry House (before 2006 – Lobortas Jewelry House) is a Ukrainian jewelry company.

== Overview ==
Lobortas Classic Jewelry House is a jewelry company established in Kyiv, Ukraine in 1997. It was formed out of a collaboration among designers, architects and jewelry makers.

== Notable Projects ==
In 2003, the Lobortas House took part in the jewelry art exhibition Joaillier Créateurs in Paris. The Wall Street Journal (Europe) described their work in Studio Lobortas as "the most romantic at the Paris show".

On July 21, 2011, the company set a Guinness World Record by inserting 2,525 cut diamonds in one ring, known as "Tsarevna Swan". This world record was later surpassed by an Indian company.

In July 2022, following the Russian invasion of Ukraine, the company donated several pieces of jewelry for a fundraiser in Windsor, Ontario. This raised over $46,000 Canadian Dollars used to donate supplies to the people of Ukraine. The company also donated jewelry to a fundraiser to support a charity in their area.

== Awards ==
- Imperial Order of St. Anne's III degree
- Honored Worker of Culture of Ukraine
- Order dedicated to 1020 jubilee of Kievan Russia baptism

== See also ==
- Guzema, another Ukrainian jewelry company
