= Paul Truong =

American-Cambodian chess player (born 1965)

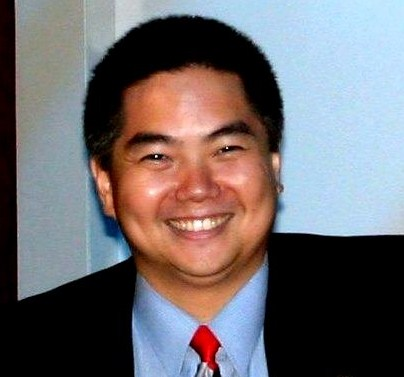

Personal information
- Born: Trương Hoài Nhân; February 6, 1965 (age 61) Saigon, South Vietnam
- Spouse: Susan Polgar (m. 2006)

Chess career
- Country: United States (until 2014); Cambodia (since 2014)
- Title: FIDE Master (1987)
- Peak rating: 2395 (July 1986)

Paul Truong (Khmer: ប៉ុល ទ្រុង, born February 6, 1965) is a Vietnamese-born American and Cambodian chess player, trainer, and organizer. He was born Trương Hoài Nhân in Saigon, South Vietnam. Truong holds the USCF title of National Master and the FIDE title of FIDE Master.

He is married to former Women's World Chess Champion Susan Polgár. He is also Polgár's business manager and vice-president of the Susan Polgar Foundation. He organized and/or promoted most of the events in which Polgár has been involved since she relocated to the United States. In 2007, Truong become the director of marketing and PR of the Susan Polgar Institute for Chess Excellence (SPICE) and coach and chief strategist of the Texas Tech University chess team, with Polgár as the executive director of SPICE and head coach. The SPICE Program relocated to Webster University in 2012. Truong has served as the coach and chief strategist of the Webster University chess team and director of marketing for the SPICE Program since then.

In 2004, Truong was the captain and business manager of the U.S. women's team for the 36th Chess Olympiad,^{[6]} which won a silver medal.^{[7]} While Truong served as coach and chief strategist, the Texas Tech University chess team was U.S. National Collegiate Champion in 2011 and 2012 and the Webster University team won in 2013, 2014, 2015, 2016, and 2017. The Webster University chess team also won (or tied for first) in the Pan American Intercollegiate Championships every year from 2012 to 2018.^{[8]}

Truong played for the "Collins Kids" founded by John W. Collins. He was on the team that went to Iceland in 1980. He also played when the U.S. hosted Iceland in a return match in New York City in 1981. In 2001, he won the U.S. Open Blitz Championship in Framingham, Massachusetts, ahead of Hikaru Nakamura.

== Early life ==
Truong's father, Tien, was a South Vietnamese official working at the U.S. embassy in Saigon during the Vietnam War. Truong learned the rules of chess along with his father at the age of five and played at the National Sports Center (CSS) in Saigon, a center for chess in the country. From an early age, he won the CSS's annual tournaments, which were informally recognized as the National Championships of South Vietnam. In all, he claims to have won the annual under-21 event four times, starting when he was five years old, and the annual adult event five times, starting when he was eight. Truong has been inactive as a competitive chess player since 1986.

== Chess journalist and photographer ==
Truong is editor-in-chief of Chess Daily News & Information.

Truong has collaborated with Polgár on most of her books and videos, and he has co-authored with her numerous chess columns and articles. In 2003, Polgár and Truong won the Cramer Award for Best Chess Column and three Chess Journalist of America Awards for Best Magazine Column, Best Endgame Analysis Column, and Best Chess Promotion column. They also won the 2004 Chess Journalist of America Award for the best endgame column in Chess Horizons.

Following is a list of books that Truong has co-authored:

- Alpha Teach Yourself Chess in 24 Hours by Susan Polgár, Paul Truong and Leslie Horvitz (2003); ISBN 0-02-864408-5
- A World Champion's Guide to Chess by Susan Polgár and Paul Truong (2005); ISBN 0-8129-3653-1
- Breaking Through: How the Polgar Sisters Changed the Game of Chess by Susan Polgár and Paul Truong (2005); ISBN 1-8574-4381-0
- Chess Tactics for Champions by Susan Polgár and Paul Truong (2006); ISBN 0-8129-3671-X

Truong is a photographer who has taken as many as 30,000 pictures per year at chess-related events in several countries. Truong's photos have appeared on multiple book and magazine covers.

== USCF election and resignation ==
In 2007, Truong ran for the USCF Executive Board and won, along with his wife, Susan. Sam Sloan, one of the defeated candidates, filed suit to overturn the election results. During the ensuing litigation, four members of the board asked Truong to step down from his position on the Board for "neglecting his fiduciary duties". The lawsuits eventually were all dismissed or settled, and Truong severed his affiliation with the USCF, with none of the parties admitting to any wrongdoing.
