= Susan Polgar =

Hungarian chess grandmaster (born 1969)

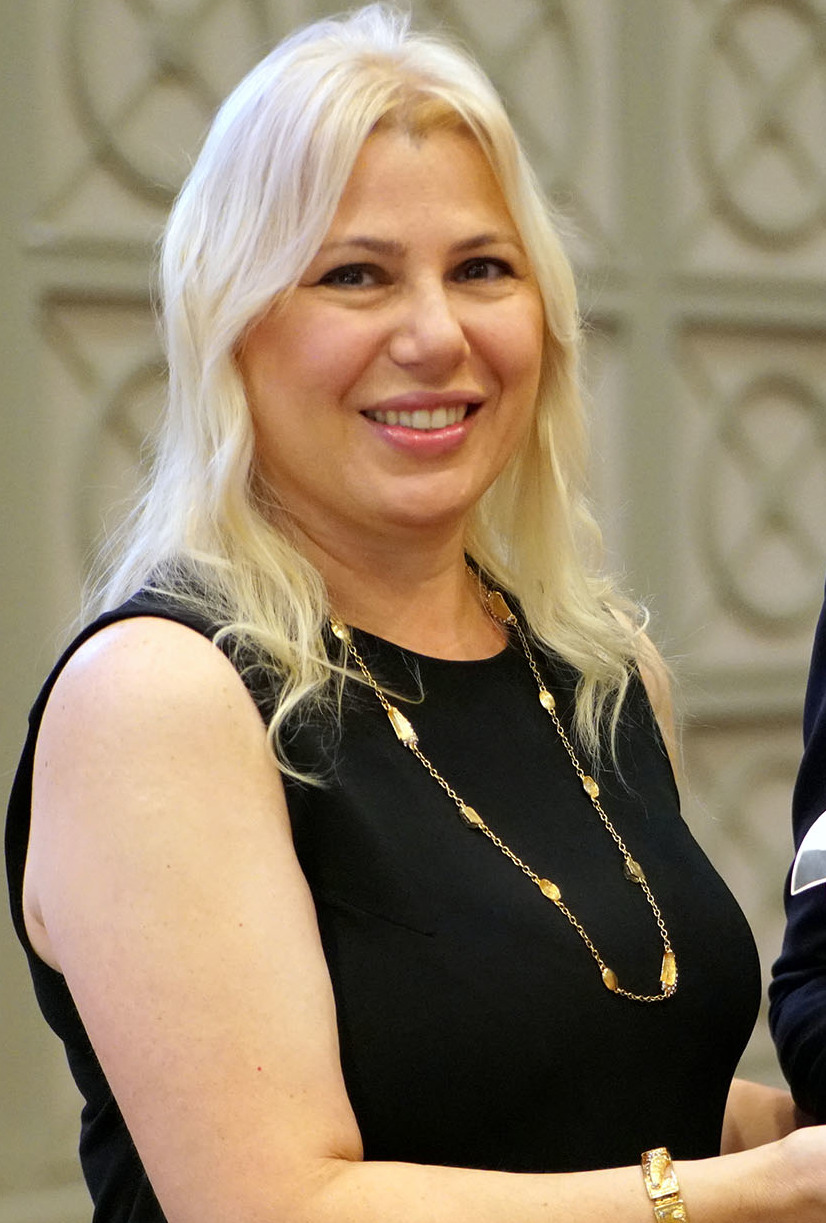
- Polgar in 2018

Personal information
- Citizenship: Hungary; United States
- Born: Zsuzsanna Polgár; April 19, 1969 (age 57) Budapest, Hungary
- Spouses: Jacob Shutzman (m. 1994, divorced) Paul Truong (m. 2006)
- Children: 2
- Father: László Polgár
- Relatives: Judit Polgár (sister); Sofia Polgar (sister)

Chess career
- Country: Hungary; United States (2002–2019)
- Title: Grandmaster (1991)
- Women's World Champion: 1996–1999
- FIDE rating: 2577 (November 2026) [inactive]
- Peak rating: 2577 (January 2005)

Susan Polgar (born April 19, 1969, as Polgár Zsuzsanna and often known as Zsuzsa Polgár) is a Hungarian-American chess grandmaster. Polgár was Women's World Chess Champion from 1996 to 1999. On FIDE's Elo rating system list of July 1984, at the age of 15, she became the top-ranked female chess player in the world. In 1991, she became the third woman to be awarded the title of Grandmaster by FIDE. She won eleven medals at the Women's Chess Olympiad (4 gold, 4 silver, and 3 bronze).

Also a trainer, writer and promoter, Polgar sponsors various chess tournaments for young players and is the head of the Susan Polgar Institute for Chess Excellence (SPICE) at Webster University. She served as the Chairperson or co-chair of the FIDE Commission for Women's Chess from 2008 until late 2018.

== Personal life ==
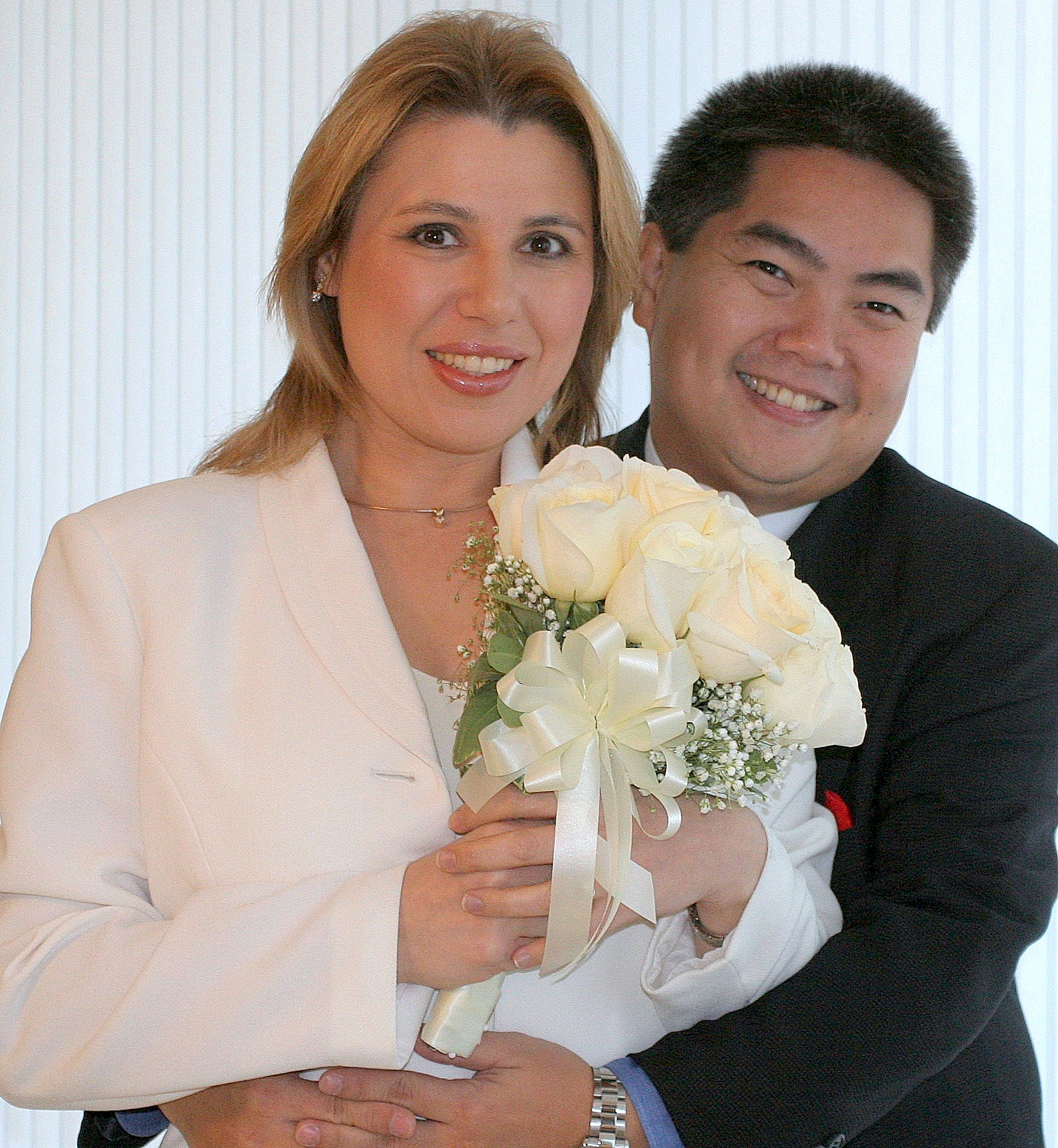
Wedding photo, 2006

Polgar was born and brought up in Budapest, Hungary, to a Hungarian-Jewish family. Members of the Polgár family, who are Jewish, perished in the Holocaust, and both grandmothers were survivors of Auschwitz. Most of her family eventually immigrated to Israel. In 1994, Polgar married computer consultant Jacob Shutzman, and moved to New York. They have two sons, Tom (born 1999) and Leeam (born 2000). They later divorced. In December 2006, she married her longtime business manager and friend, Paul Truong. In 2007, she lived in suburban St. Louis, Missouri. As of 2025, she lives in Lake Mary, Florida.

In 2023, she received the Carnegie Corporation of New York's Great Immigrant Award.

== Chess career ==
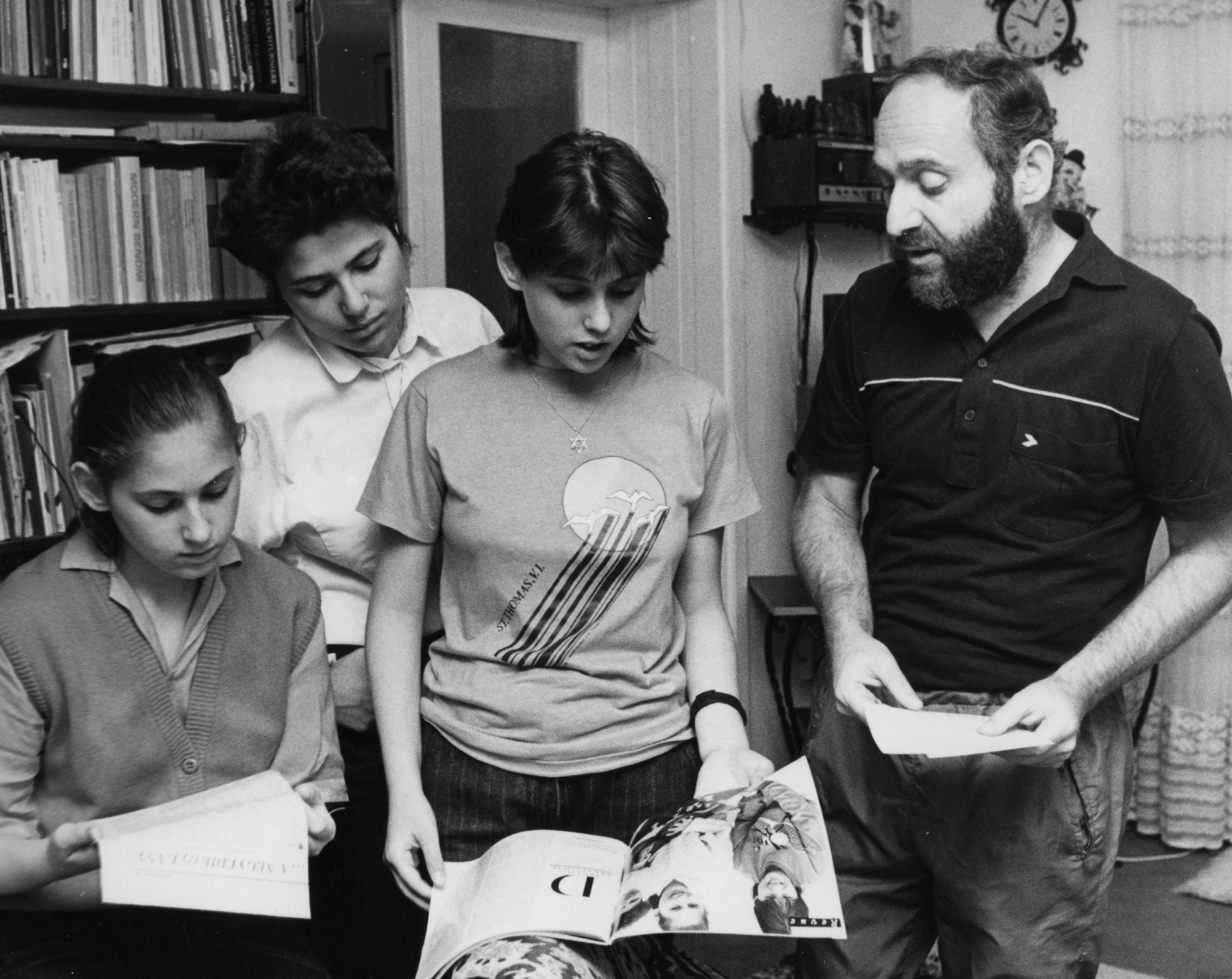
Judit, Zsuzsa, Zsófia, and László Polgár, 1989

Polgar and her two younger sisters, Grandmaster Judit and International Master Sofia, were part of an educational experiment carried out by their father László Polgár, who sought to prove that children could make exceptional achievements if trained in a specialized subject from a very early age. "Geniuses are made, not born," was László's thesis. He and his wife Klara educated their three daughters at home, with chess as the principal subject. In 2007, National Geographic released an hour-long documentary entitled "My Brilliant Brain" with Susan Polgar as the main subject (re-released as a DVD in multiple countries in multiple languages through 2010). The father also taught his three daughters Esperanto.

At age 4, Susan Polgar won her first chess tournament, the Budapest Girls' Under-11 Championship, with a 10–0 score. In 1981, at the age of 12, she won the World Under 16 Girls Championship. Despite restrictions on her freedom to play in international tournaments, in July 1984, at age 15, Polgar had become the top-rated female chess player in the world. In 1986, aged 17, she narrowly missed qualifying for the Zonal, the first step in the "Men's" world championship cycle.

In November 1986, FIDE decided to grant 100 bonus Elo rating points to all active female players except Polgar, which knocked her from the top spot in the January 1987 FIDE ratings list. The rationale was that the FIDE ratings of women were not commensurate with the ratings of the men because the women tended to play in women-only tournaments, Polgar being an exception because up to that point she had played mainly against men.

In January 1991, Polgar became the third woman awarded the title of Grandmaster by FIDE, after Nona Gaprindashvili and Maia Chiburdanidze. Polgar was the youngest woman to become grandmaster at the time, but this record was soon broken by Judit in December 1991 (where Judit became both youngest female grandmaster and youngest grandmaster).

In 1992, Polgar won both the Women's World Blitz and the Women's World Rapid Championship.

Prior to 1992, Polgar tended to avoid women-only tournaments. She entered the candidates' cycle for the 1993 Women's World Championship and was eliminated after the candidates' final match with Nana Ioseliani. The match was drawn at the chessboard and the winner advanced to the championship based on the drawing of lots. She became the Women's World Champion at her second attempt in 1996. Her title defense against Xie Jun of China was scheduled to take place in 1998 but FIDE had been unable to find a satisfactory sponsor. In early 1999, a match was arranged, but under conditions to which Polgar objected. As a result, Polgar requested a postponement because she was pregnant and due to give birth to a child, Tom, in March 1999. She felt that she did not have sufficient time to recuperate, and secondly because the match was to be held entirely in China, the home country of her challenger. She also wanted a larger prize fund matching at least the minimum stipulated by FIDE regulations at the time (200000 CHF).

When Polgar refused to play under these conditions, FIDE declared that she had forfeited the title, and instead organized a match between Xie Jun and Alisa Galliamova for the Women's World Chess Championship, which was won by Xie Jun. Polgar sued in the Court of Arbitration for Sport in Lausanne, Switzerland for monetary damages and the restoration of her title. In March 2001, the case was settled, with Polgar withdrawing her claims and FIDE agreeing to pay Polgar's attorney's fees in the amount of $25,000. Since Xie Jun had already been crowned Women's World Champion, FIDE could not restore the title to Polgar. Polgar has not participated in subsequent Women's World Championship cycles.

=== American career ===
In 2002 Polgar changed her national federation from Hungary to the United States. The United States Chess Federation named her "Grandmaster of the Year" in 2003, the first time a woman has won that honor. In that same year, Polgar also became the first woman to win the US Open Blitz Championship, against a field which included seven grandmasters. She won that title again in 2005 and in 2006.

She helped train and played the top board for the United States women's team at the 2004 Chess Olympiad held in October in Calvià on the island of Mallorca, Spain. Overall, the team won the silver medal, and Polgar won an individual gold medal for achieving the highest performance rating in the women's event and the highest point total. She has a total of eleven Olympiad medals: four gold, four silver, and three bronze. She has played 56 games in the Women's Olympiads, never losing a game.

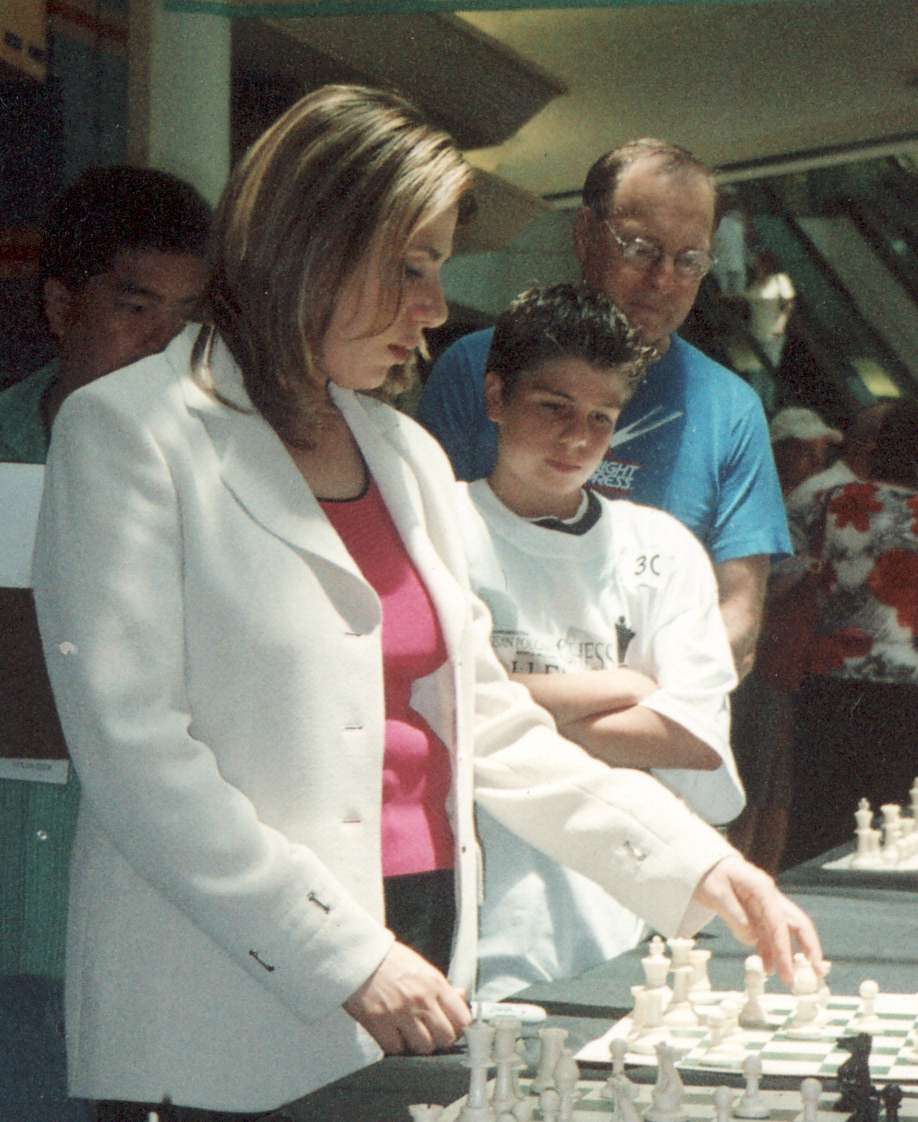
Polgar in a simultaneous exhibition

In July 2005, Polgar gave a large simultaneous exhibition in Palm Beach, Florida, breaking four world records: the largest number of simultaneous games played (326, with 309 won, 14 drawn, and 3 lost); consecutive games played (1,131); highest number of games won (1,112); and highest percentage of wins (96.93%).

In October 2005, Polgar joined former Soviet President Mikhail Gorbachev and former World Champion Anatoly Karpov in Lindsborg, Kansas, to promote "Chess For Peace." There, Polgar participated in the second Clash of the Titans - Battle of the Genders match against Karpov at the same location, with Gorbachev making the first move for Karpov. The match with Karpov ended in a 3–3 tie, with each player winning two games and two draws. Their first match had taken place in September 2004. That also ended up in a 3–3 tie.

In June 2006, Polgar organized and played in the 2006 New York City Mayor's Cup, a 30-minute competition and the highest-rated double round-robin tournament in US history. She finished second, behind Gata Kamsky and ahead of Alexander Onischuk, Boris Gulko, Ildar Ibragimov, and Alexander Stripunsky. In July 2006, Polgar represented the US in a side event to the Football World Cup in Dresden, Germany. She won the event, defeating Elisabeth Pähtz in the final.

Polgar switched her federation affiliation back to Hungary in June 2019.

== Trainer ==
In 1997, Polgar founded the Polgar Chess Center in Forest Hills, New York, to give chess training to children. The Polgar Chess Center closed in 2009 following her relocation to Texas Tech University in Lubbock, Texas. In 2002, she established the Susan Polgar Foundation. Since then, her foundation has sponsored the National Invitational for Girls, National Open Championship for Boys and Girls, World Open Championship for Boys and Girls, North American All Girls Championship, All-Star Girl's Chess Team, NY City Mayor's Cup Invitational, Tri-State Scholastic Chess Challenge, SPICE Cup and a series of Get Smart Play Chess scholastic chess tournaments. She founded the SPICE Institute in Texas in 2007 and began coaching the Texas Tech Knight Raiders in 2007 as well.

=== Texas Tech Knight Raiders ===
In 2007, Susan Polgar signed on as the head coach for the Texas Tech Knight Raiders chess team.

In 2010, as the head coach for the Texas Tech Knight Raiders chess team, Susan Polgar became the first woman to lead a chess team to the Final Four. In April 2011 the Texas Tech Knight Raiders won the President's Cup; this made Polgar the first female head coach to lead a chess team to the national title. They won again in 2012.

=== Webster University ===
In 2012, Polgar and the SPICE program, along with members of her top collegiate chess team, moved to Webster University in St. Louis, Missouri.^{[23] [24]} Webster won the 2013, 2014, 2015, 2016 and 2017 Final Fours of College Chess, also known as the President's Cup. As a result, Polgar was recognized as 2012-13 College Coach of the Year by Final 4 organizer Booz Allen Hamilton, the US government and military contractor. The Webster University chess team has also won, or tied for first, in the Pan American Intercollegiate Championships 2012–2018.

== Notable games ==
Polgar vs. Hardicsay, 1985

Position: a8 white queen, b8 black knight, d8 black queen, e8 black king, h8 black rook, f7 black pawn, h7 black pawn, a6 black pawn, d6 black pawn, g6 black pawn, c5 black pawn, d5 white pawn, f4 white bishop, g4 black bishop, c3 white knight, a2 white pawn, b2 white pawn, f2 white king, g2 white pawn, h2 white pawn, f1 white bishop, h1 white rook

Position after 16...Bg4

Position: a8 white queen, b8 black knight, d8 black queen, g8 black king, h8 black rook, f7 black pawn, h7 black pawn, d6 black pawn, g6 black pawn, h6 white bishop, b5 black pawn, c5 black pawn, d5 white pawn, g4 black bishop, c3 white knight, a2 white pawn, b2 white pawn, f2 white king, g2 white pawn, h2 white pawn, e1 white rook

Position after 19...Kg8

Position: b8 black queen, g8 black king, h8 black rook, d7 black bishop, e7 white rook, f7 black pawn, h7 black pawn, d6 black pawn, g6 black pawn, h6 white bishop, b5 black pawn, c5 black pawn, d5 white pawn, e4 white knight, a2 white pawn, b2 white pawn, f2 white king, g2 white pawn, h2 white pawn

Final position

Here is a game that Polgar won at age 16:

Polgar vs. Hardicsay, Hungarian Team Championship 1985
1. d4 Nf6 2. c4 c5 3. d5 e6 4. Nc3 exd5 5. cxd5 d6 6. Nf3 g6 7. Bf4 a6 8. e4 Bg7 9. Qa4+ Bd7 10. Qb3 Bg4?! 11. Qxb7 Bxf3 Hardicsay had won a game a few months before after 12.gxf3 Nh5, when Black has good compensation for the sacrificed pawn after either 13.Be3 Nd7 or 13.Bg3 Nxg3 14.hxg3 Nd7. 12. Qxa8! Nxe4 13. Rc1! This was a theoretical novelty; Black had been thought to be better after 13.Nxe4 Bxe4. 13... Bd4 After 13...Nxc3 14.bxc3 Be4 15.f3 Bf5 16.g4, Black would have no good retreat for his bishop, e.g. 16...Bd7 17.Bxd6. 14. Rc2 Nxf2?! 14...Nxc3 15.gxf3! also leaves White with a large advantage. 15. Rxf2 Bxf2+ 16. Kxf2 Bg4 (diagram) 17. Bb5+! axb5 18. Re1+ Kf8 If 18...Kd7, 19.Qb7+ Qc7 20.Re7+! wins the queen. 19. Bh6+ Kg8 (diagram) 20. Re7! Paralyzing Black and stopping any counterplay with ...Qh4+. The rook is immune because 20...Qxe7 21.Qxb8+ forces mate. 20... Bd7 21. Qxb8! Qxb8 22. Ne4! 1–0 Although Black is up a queen for a knight, he cannot stop 23.Nf6#.

== SPICE Institute and SPICE Cup ==
On May 12, 2007, Polgar was the undergraduate commencement speaker at Texas Tech University. She was awarded an honorary Doctorate degree. On the same day, as reported on the LubbockOnline website, it was announced that she would become the coach of the Texas Tech chess team and would be the director of the new Susan Polgar Institute for Chess Excellence (SPICE). In 2008, SPICE announced a $320,000 pledge from a private donor, for TTU chess scholarships over the next five years.

In 2007 Texas Tech and Susan Polgar hosted the first SPICE Cup which has since become the highest rated international round robin chess tournament held in the United States.

== Bibliography ==
Polgar has written several books, often in conjunction with Paul Truong, her business manager and (later) husband:

- Queen of the Kings Game (as Zsuzsa Polgar; with Jacob Shutzman) (1997) ISBN 0-9657059-7-8
- Teach Yourself Chess in 24 Hours (with Paul Truong) (2003) ISBN 0-02-864408-5
- A World Champion's Guide to Chess (with Paul Truong) (2005) ISBN 0-8129-3653-1
- Breaking Through (with Paul Truong) (2005) ISBN 1-8574-4381-0
- Chess Tactics for Champions (with Paul Truong) (2006) ISBN 0-8129-3671-X
- Rich As A King: How the Wisdom of Chess Can Make You a Grandmaster of Investing (with Douglas Goldstein, CFP®) (2014) ISBN 978-1-63047-097-5 paperback
- Learn Chess the Right Way, Book 1 Must Know Checkmates (2016) ISBN 978-1-941270-21-9
- Learn Chess the Right Way, Book 2 Winning Material (2016) ISBN 978-1-941270-45-5
- Learn Chess the Right Way, Book 3 Mastering Defensive Technique (2016) ISBN 978-1-941270-49-3
- Learn Chess the Right Way, Book 4 Sacrifice to Win (2017) ISBN 978-1-941270-65-3
- Learn Chess the Right Way, Book 5 Finding Winning Moves (2017) ISBN 978-1-941270-66-0

Polgar is also a chess journalist, with columns in Chess Life, Chess Life for Kids, ChessCafe, Chess Horizons, Georgia Chess, Chessville, Empire Chess, School Mates, Europe Echecs, and others. She also publishes a blog titled Chess Daily News with daily updates about chess news and daily chess exercise problems. She has released a series of instructional chess videos.

=== Rebel Queen ===
In 2025, Hachette Book Group published Polgar's Rebel Queen: The Cold War, Misogyny, and the Making of a Grandmaster. The Brooklyn Rail wrote of the book, "It should be read by every girl and woman who plays chess and, after they’ve finished, they should give the book to their male chess-playing friends and encourage them to read it." In a Times of Israel feature on the title, Polgar said, "I look at chess primarily as a constant pursuit for truth. It’s why chess is considered not just a sport, but also a science as well as art. Ultimately, even though you have an opponent, the opponent is just there to make the game more interesting."

== US Chess Federation and FIDE ==
In December 2006, she announced that she would run for election to the executive board of the United States Chess Federation. Polgar, Randy Bauer, and Paul Truong—three of four of Polgar's slate—were elected to four-year terms. She was elected as the first ever chairman of the USCF.

On October 2, 2007, one of the candidates for the executive board position, who had been defeated by Susan Polgar, filed a lawsuit seeking to overturn the results of the 2007 election, alleging misconduct. Polgar denied any wrongdoing. Polgar filed suit against the USCF, who counter-sued, with both sides issuing a variety of allegations. The suit alleging election campaign misconduct was ultimately dismissed by the court.

On January 15, 2008, four board members issued a statement which requested Susan Polgar's husband step down from his position on the Board for "neglecting his fiduciary duties" through not providing an affirmative defense to the lawsuit. This was not, however, an official vote of the executive board. Polgar subsequently published a statement asserting that the board members who voted in favor of this request made a number of misrepresentations.

On August 7, 2009, the executive board of the USCF rescinded the membership of Polgar and her husband, and they appealed to the Board of Delegates of the USCF. On August 8, 2009, the Delegates of the USCF ratified the previous year's actions of the executive board with respect to the litigation. In a closed Executive Session, the Delegates upheld the membership revocations. The lawsuits were all settled in 2010, with Polgar and Truong severing all affiliation with the USCF (though both can still play in USCF events under "Playing Non-Member Status"); the USCF's court costs of $131,000 were paid out by its insurer and it had to pay Polgar's attorney fees of $39,000.

In 2014, Polgar was awarded the Furman Symeon medal, which is given annually to the best chess coach who works with both male and female players. This made her the first coach from America to earn one of the top six coach medals and also the first woman to ever be recognized by FIDE with a top coaching medal.

In 2016, Polgar was involved in the Iran hijab controversy due to an erroneous report by the Telegraph Media Group that she was supporting the mandatory requirement of international women players to conform to Iranian dress code in her role with the FIDE women's commission. Polgar immediately stated that she was misquoted in the Telegraph article. A correction to her statement was issued one week later on June 10, 2016. U.S. women's champion Nazí Paikidze was among several players who refused to participate in the championship in protest against the mandatory hijab.

In March 2019, Polgar was inducted into the U.S. Chess Hall of Fame in St. Louis, Missouri.

Preceded by Xie Jun	Women's World Chess Champion; 1996–1999	Succeeded by vacant, then Xie Jun
