= Dolfi Drimer =

Romanian chess player

Personal information
- Born: 18 October 1934 Iași, Romania
- Died: 1 June 2014 (aged 79) Bucharest, Romania

Chess career
- Country: Romania
- Title: International Master (1961)
- Peak rating: 2420 (July 1971)

Dolfi Drimer (18 October 1934 — 1 June 2014), was a Romanian chess player and engineer, International Master (IM) (1961). He was first rector of the Ecological University of Bucharest.

== Biography ==
Dolfi Drimer graduated in 1956 from the Politehnica University of Bucharest, becoming a mechanical engineer, and from 1966 an economist engineer. In 1969 he became a doctor in engineering sciences, specializing in physical metallurgy. Between 1956 and 1960 Dolfi Drimer was a scientific researcher at the Metallurgical Research Center in Romanian Academy. Between 1960 and 1968 he was an engineer at the "Electronica" Enterprise, and between 1964 and 1968 a design engineer at the "Automatica" Design Institute. Between 1968 and 1971 Dolfi Drimer was a lecturer, professor and head of the Department of Welding Technology at the Polytechnic Institute of Bucharest. Since 1990 he has been founder and rector of the first private higher education institution in the country - Ecological University of Bucharest. Dolfi Drimer was member of the American Society of Mechanical Engineers (ASME) and the American Welding Society. He was author of many scientific research works.

In the 1950s and 1960s Dolfi Drimer was one of the leading Romanian chess players. He was a participant of the Romanian Chess Championship where 13 times played in finals and in 1957 won silver medal. In 1961, he was awarded the FIDE International Master (IM) title. In 1962, Dolfi Drimer shared third place with Florin Gheorghiu in International Chess Tournament in Bucharest.

Dolfi Drimer played for Romania in the Chess Olympiads:

- In 1960, at second board in the 14th Chess Olympiad in Leipzig (+6, =8, -3),
- In 1966, at first reserve board in the 17th Chess Olympiad in Havana (+7, =2, -2),
- In 1968, at fourth board in the 18th Chess Olympiad in Lugano (+6, =1, -3).

Also Dolfi Drimer played for Romania in the European Team Chess Championships and the World Student Team Chess Championships.
