= Carissa Yip =

American chess player (born 2003)

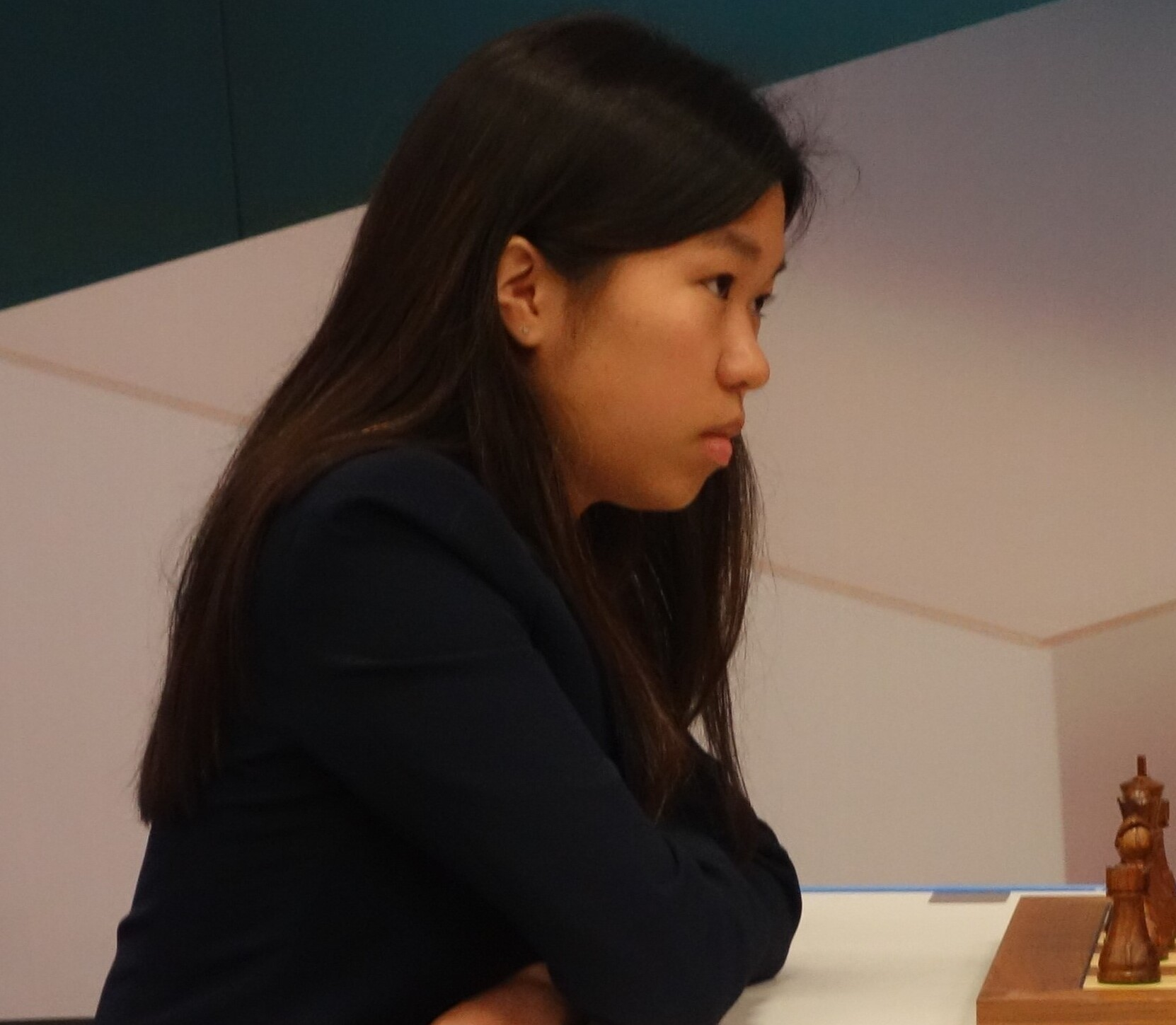
- Yip in 2026

Personal information
- Born: Carissa Shiwen Yip; September 10, 2003 (age 23) Boston, Massachusetts, U.S.

Chess career
- Country: United States
- Title: International Master (2020); Woman Grandmaster (2019)
- FIDE rating: 2484 (October 2026)
- Peak rating: 2486 (March 2026)

Carissa Yip
- Traditional Chinese: 葉詩文
- Simplified Chinese: 叶诗文
Transcriptions
Standard Mandarin
- Hanyu Pinyin: Yè Shīwén
Yue: Cantonese
- Jyutping: Jip^{6} Si^{1} Man^{4}

Carissa Shiwen Yip (born September 10, 2003) is an American chess player and the winner of the 2021, 2023, 2024, and 2025 U.S. Women's Chess Championship. In September 2019, she was the top rated female player in the United States and the youngest female chess player to defeat a grandmaster, which she did at age ten, a record since surpassed by Bodhana Sivanandan in August 2025. In October 2019, she became the youngest American woman in history to qualify for the title of International Master, a record surpassed by Alice Lee in June 2023.

== Early life and chess career ==
Carissa Shiwen Yip was born on September 10, 2003, in Boston. Her father Percy Yip (Chinese: 葉培照; Pinyin: Yè Péizhào) was from Hong Kong, and her mother Irene Yip (née Cheng, Chinese: 程华琳; Pinyin: Chéng Huálín) was from mainland China.

Yip was taught chess moves at age six by her father, and within six months she was able to beat him. Soon, she became the best eight-year-old girl chess player in the country. In 2013, at the age of ten, she became the youngest female player to qualify for the USCF title of Expert (rating >2000) in history, and in 2015, at eleven years old, she became the youngest female national master. These records were later broken by Rachael Li.

In June 2014, at the age of 10, she became club champion of the Wachusett Chess Club in Fitchburg, Massachusetts with a 7–0 score.

Her first victory against a grandmaster came on August 30, 2014, when she defeated Alexander Ivanov at the New England Open. At ten years of age, she was the youngest female chess player ever to beat a grandmaster; this record was surpassed by Bodhana Sivanandan in August 2025.

=== International Master ===
Yip competed in the U.S. Women's Chess Championship for the first time in 2016; she finished 9th out of 12, scoring 4½ points out of 11. In 2017, she scored 4/11, finishing 11th. In 2019, she finished 8th, with a score of 4½/11. In June 2018, Yip earned her final Woman International Master (WIM) norm, first Woman Grandmaster (WGM) norm, and first International Master (IM) norm by winning clear first place in the Charlotte Chess Center's Summer 2018 IM Norm Invitational held in Charlotte, North Carolina with an undefeated score of 7/9. In July 2018, she became the 2018 U.S. Junior Girls' Champion with a score of 7/9, as well as the 2018 World Open Women's Champion. In late June 2019, she won the North American Junior Girls' Championship, held in Charlotte, North Carolina, with a score of 8½/9, earning the FIDE title of Woman Grandmaster in the process. She subsequently scored 7½/9 to win the 2019 U.S. Junior Girls' Championship, earning an invitation to the 2020 U.S. Women's Championship. In 2020, Yip repeated as U.S. Junior Girls' Champion, again with a 7½/9 score, and placed second in the U.S. Women's Chess Championship with a score of 8/11, a ½-point behind Irina Krush. In 2023, Yip finished tied for third place in U.S. Junior Girls' Championship.

Her performance at the 2019 SPICE Cup, where she scored 5/9, made her the youngest American female player to earn the title of International Master, at the age of 16 years, one month, and 18 days old. The previous such youngest was Irina Krush. FIDE awarded Yip the title in February 2020. Yip’s record was broken by Alice Lee in 2023.

Yip was chosen for the Frank P. Samford, Jr. Chess Fellowship in 2020, 2021, 2022, 2023, 2024, 2025, and 2026.

In 2021, Yip competed at the FIDE Women's World Cup, a 103-player single-elimination tournament that took place in Sochi, Russia. She was seeded 28th coming into the tournament and defeated players Sharmin Sultana Shirin and Nataliya Buksa before being eliminated by Nana Dzagnidze in Round 3. Yip won the 2021 U.S. Women's Championship in St. Louis, scoring 8½/11—1½ points ahead of second place—and defeated four former Women's champions in the tournament, those four being Irina Krush, Anna Zatonskih, Nazí Paikidze, and Sabina Foisor. This made her the first woman to defeat four former U.S. Women’s champions in a U.S. Women's Championship.

In 2022 Carissa Yip was a member of the U.S. women's team at the 44th Chess Olympiad; the team finished as fourth.

=== 2023–2025 ===
In 2023, she qualified for the FIDE Women's World Cup and won her first-round match, but was eliminated in the second round. Also in 2023, Yip won the silver medal in the FIDE World Junior Girls Championship. On October 17, 2023, Yip won the U.S. Women's Championship with a score of 8.5/11. In December 2023, Yip won the Junior Open at the North American Junior Championships, and received her first grandmaster norm due to her performance there.

In 2024, she won the individual gold and the team bronze playing on Board 2 at the women's event of the 45th Chess Olympiad. Yip had the highest individual score in the tournament of 10 out of 11 with a performance rating of 2634. Also in 2024, she won her third US Women's Championship, winning her first 8 games and inviting comparisons to Bobby Fischer's legendary 11–0 performance in 1964.

In June 2025, Yip overcame a poor start (1.5/4) to win the Cairns Cup, winning the next four games and drawing Alice Lee in the final round to secure her second GM norm with a performance rating of 2614.

Yip claimed her 4th US Women's title in October 2025, becoming one of only 4 women to win 3 straight US Championships. Despite losing her first match vs. Atousa Pourkashiyan, Yip finished with a final score of 8/11, including a stretch of scoring 6.5/7 to finish out the tournament.

=== 2026 ===
Yip won the Tata Steel Chess India 2026's Women's Blitz section by scoring 10½/18 and defeating Vantika Agrawal in the tiebreaks in early January 2026.

In July 2026, Yip won the rapid section of the WR Women's Chess Tour - Americas 2026.

In August 2026, she and Bibisara Assaubayeva tied for third place in the Cairns Cup.

At the 46th Chess Olympiad in September 2026, she had a score of 8/10 and won the individual silver medal on board 1.

=== FIDE ratings ===
Elo development
View chart definition.

=== Notable games ===
Yip vs. Krush 2016

Position: g7 white rook, f6 white pawn, h6 black king, h5 black pawn, b4 black pawn, b3 white pawn, a1 white king, h1 black bishop

White to move: 53.?

Carissa Shiwen Yip vs Alexander Vladimirovich Ivanov (N.E. Open, 2014). Modern Defense: Standard Line (B06) 1-0. Ignoring a pin on the b-file, Yip earns her first win against a Grandmaster.

Carissa Shiwen Yip vs Irina Krush, 2016 US Chess Championship (Women). Sicilian Defense: Kan. Yip defeats a six-time US Women's Champion. The final position contains a problem-like move. (Note: 53.Rg5! 1-0. If Black then captures the rook, White's f-pawn cannot be stopped from queening, whereas 53...Bd5 loses the bishop and Black is left with a lost endgame against the rook.)

== Education ==
Yip graduated from Phillips Academy in 2022 and then enrolled at Stanford University. She is majoring in comparative literature and computer science. As of 2025, Yip is on leave from Stanford to pursue chess full-time.

== Television game show appearance ==
Yip and compatriot Irina Krush appeared on a special primetime episode of The Price Is Right that aired on January 18, 2023. Yip never got out of Contestant's Row while Krush won the Clock Game but failed to advance to the Showcases.

== Notes ==
Achievements
Preceded by Irina Krush	U.S. Women's Chess Champion; 2021	Succeeded by Jennifer Yu
Preceded by Jennifer Yu	U.S. Women's Chess Champion; 2023	Incumbent
