= Nancy Roos =

American chess player (1905–1957)

Nancy Roos (February 28, 1905 – April 6, 1957) was a U.S. chess champion.

She was born as Nanny [sic] Krotoschin in Berlin, which was then a part of Prussia, to Georg Krotoschin and Martha Cohn Krotoschin, who were part of a large Jewish family that had lived in Berlin for generations. She married Martin Roos, who had been born in 1903 in Amsterdam, Netherlands. Her place of birth has often been listed incorrectly in various sources as Brussels, Belgium, as that is where she wed Roos in 1936. Before coming to America in 1939, she was active at the Cercle l'Echiquier in Brussels. Roos' sister Eva Krotoschin Beim was murdered in the Holocaust, and her brother Heinz "Henry" Kent survived and later gave videotaped testimony to the USC Shoah Project.

Roos won the U.S. Women's Chess Championship in 1955 with Gisela Kahn Gresser, both scoring 9–2. She took second at the Pan-American Tournament in 1954 behind Mary Bain and Mona May Karff, and tied for second at the 1942 U.S. Women's Championship behind Adele Belcher and Karff.

Roos was a professional photographer and at the time of her death was the second highest rated woman in the U.S. Chess Federation. She died of breast cancer in Los Angeles, California.
