= Jennifer Yu (chess player) =

American chess player (born 2002)

Personal information
- Born: February 1, 2002 (age 24) Ithaca, New York

Chess career
- Country: United States
- Title: FIDE Master (2017); Woman Grandmaster (2018)
- Peak rating: 2379 (February 2018)

Jennifer Yu
- Traditional Chinese: 于潤荷
- Simplified Chinese: 于润荷
Transcriptions
Standard Mandarin
- Hanyu Pinyin: Yú Rùnhé

Jennifer Runhe Yu (born February 1, 2002) is an American chess woman grandmaster. She was awarded the title Woman Grandmaster by FIDE in 2018. Yu is a two-time U.S. women's champion, winning in 2019 and 2022.

== Early life ==
Born in Ithaca, New York, both her parents are of Chinese origin. Yu started playing chess in first grade, attending an after-school chess class. After the school finished its chess sessions, Yu wanted to continue her interest and asked her parents to find a coach.

== Chess career ==
Yu started playing in chess tournaments at the age of 7, in 2009. By the end of 2013, her rating had risen to 2100. In 2014, Yu competed at the World Youth Chess Championships in Durban, South Africa in the Girls U12 section and took the gold medal. She was the first female player to do so for the United States in 27 years. Yu won the Virginia State Closed Championship in 2015, becoming the youngest player and first female to do so. She also won the National Girls Tournament of Champions three times, tying in 2014 and 2015, and winning outright in 2016. Yu played on the US team at the Women's World Team Chess Championship in 2017 and at the Women's Chess Olympiad in 2018. In the latter event Yu won an individual bronze medal playing board five.

In January 2018, Yu earned her second IM norm and second WGM norm by tying for first place with GM Titas Stremavičius in the Charlotte Chess Center's Winter 2018 IM Norm Invitational held in Charlotte, North Carolina with a score of 6.5/9.

In 2019, Jennifer Yu won the U.S. Women's Chess Championship and therefore qualified to play in the Women's World Cup. She won nine games out of eleven and drew two, with Annie Wang and Tatev Abrahamyan in rounds 5 and 9 respectively. Before round 10, Yu led by 2 points ahead of the rest of the field. Because of this, nobody else in the field would be able to catch up to her for first, except for Anna Zatonskih. In the penultimate round, Yu beat her, securing the champion title with a round to spare. Yu also won the last game, finishing the tournament with a score of 10/11 points and a performance rating of 2678.

In 2021, Yu competed in the FIDE Women's World Cup, a 103-player single-elimination tournament that took place in Sochi, Russia. She was seeded 72nd coming into the tournament and upset player Kulon Klaudia in the first round before losing to Saduakassova Dinara in Round 2.

In July 2022, Yu won the U.S. Girls Junior Chess Championship. She finished with a score of 7/9 tied with WFM Sophie Morris Suzuki and WGM Thalia Cervantes Landeiro. Yu won the tournament after two rounds of tiebreakers, winning her first playoff against Suzuki and losing against Cervantes Laneiro. Yu was able to comeback and defeat both girls in Round 2 blitz playoffs with a total score of 3/4 in the playoffs.

Yu won her second U.S. Women's Chess Championship in October 2022, defeating Irina Krush in a tiebreaker match.

== Playing style ==
At the age of nine, Jennifer’s coach then saw promise in her chess. "Jennifer is really talented and has huge potential," said her coach to Jennifer's parents, who were moving to Ashburn, "you have to find her a coach." Since then, Jennifer's talent blossomed, and a wave of rating gain saw Jennifer's ranking shoot up, which coincided with her starting to improve her openings by memorizing specific move sequences. Her coach Larry Christiansen said, "Jennifer has all the key ingredients of a top player. She has great vision of the 64 squares, tactical alertness, superior memory, will to win, and, most especially, strong mental stamina. She will no doubt reach the grandmaster level if she stays with the game."

Her win in the 2014 World Junior Championship impressed GM Benjamin Finegold, who noted, "I was most impressed with her last round game, where, after already clinching Gold, she simply crushed her opponent." He adds, "[the game] show[s] the class Jennifer has over the field. By avoiding theory and playing a purely positional game, she easily builds a winning advantage; I expect Jennifer will be a force to reckon with in many future US Women's Championships." In an interview after the 2014 World Junior Championship, Jennifer said, "I don't like giving away points." However, in contrast to her style just 3 years ago, she revealed that she didn't like to use scripted openings or planned attacks. "I can play any style I get into; I can play position or aggressive attacking," she said.

In 2019, when Jennifer Yu scored 10/11 in the U.S. Women's Chess Championship, Jennifer Shahade, a two-time U.S. women's champion stated, "[Yu] blew the competition out of the water, her performance is one of the best I've ever seen; [the fact that Yu won] so many games against professional adults, as well as girls, is just really incredible." Shahade thought Yu was modest and hard-working and was as much a fighter as a tactician. She characterizes the teenager's chess as uncompromising, "If her opponent misses an opportunity, she pounces on it immediately; she never gives up."

Despite having a few tournament victories to her name, Jennifer also has disappointing tournament results. Three months after her historical performance in the U.S. Women's Chess Championship, she was invited as a wildcard to the U.S. Junior Championship, where she was seeded second to last in a 10-player field as the only female competitor. Finishing last with losses in all but one game, a draw against 4th place GM Andrew Tang, Jennifer shared areas for improvement in her post-tournament interview, "My openings have been a problem for years and years…Also, I need to fix my time management."

In a later interview, Jennifer elaborated, "I'd like to mention that I've always been an incredibly inconsistent player. If my worst tournaments and my best ones were put side by side and compared, it wouldn't look like I was the same player." As an example to further her point, she shared, "My situation in the hunt for the IM title also makes perfect sense because I have all three of my norms but have yet to cross the 2400 threshold. To me, this means that I am capable of performing at IM-level strength in my best tournaments, making it possible to achieve the norms, but that I'm definitely a long road away from consistently playing at that level." Her inconsistency and fighting spirit were again on full display in her tumultuous tournament victory in the 2022 U.S. Women's Chess Championship, where she finished tied for first on 9/13 with 8 wins, 3 losses, and 2 draws before three more decisive games in the tiebreaks crowned Jennifer Yu champion over Irina Krush. "I like to create messes," said Jennifer, who trusted her ability to navigate unclear positions and tactical vision. Jennifer always tries to have decisive games and her universal style makes her comfortable steering the game to where her opponents may wish to avoid, but she prefers tactical middlegames that offer more winning chances to drier positions.

== Personal life ==
Yu graduated from Stone Bridge High School in Ashburn, Virginia and from Harvard University in 2025.

Achievements
Preceded by Nazí Paikidze	U.S. Women's Chess Champion; 2019	Succeeded by Irina Krush
Preceded by Carissa Yip	U.S. Women's Chess Champion; 2022	Succeeded by Carissa Yip
