= Alisa Melekhina =

American chess player (born 1991)

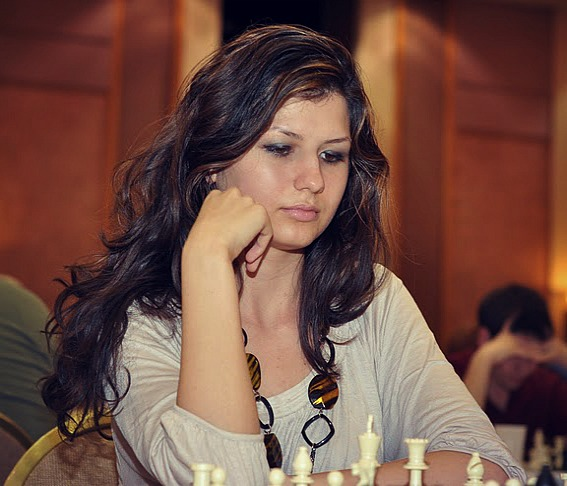
- Alisa Melekhina, US Open 2010 in Orlando, FL

Personal information
- Born: June 26, 1991 (age 35) Simferopol, Ukrainian SSR, Soviet Union

Chess career
- Country: United States
- Title: FIDE Master (2011); Woman International Master (2008)
- FIDE rating: 2196 (July 2023)
- Peak rating: 2304 (March 2011)

Alisa Melekhina (born June 26, 1991) is an American chess player. She is also a classically trained ballerina and an alumna of the University of Pennsylvania Law School and Drexel University.

Melekhina is a frequent contender in the U.S. Women's Chess Championship, and has represented the United States in numerous World Youth and Junior Chess Championships, where she has placed in the top ten. She placed fifth at the 2014 US Women's Championships. She graduated from the University of Pennsylvania Law School aged 22, in May 2014.

== Early life ==
Melekhina was born in Simferopol in 1991. She immigrated with her parents to the United States when she was only two months old. They originally settled in Brooklyn, New York while her father completed his dental re-accreditation. They moved to Philadelphia five years later, where Melekhina has resided since. Melekhina was taught to play chess by her father and only coach at age 5, and played in her first tournament when she was 7. She also began taking Vaganova-style ballet lessons at that age, and has been dancing ballet and pointe since. At age 6, she authored "The Frog Princess," a translation of a popular Russian fairy tale, making her a published author at age 8.

== Chess achievements ==
Melekhina's top chess accomplishments include:

- Finishing top 10 at the World Youths and World Junior Chess Championships.
- Winning the gold medal best individual board four performance at the Women's World Championships held in Ningbo, China in 2009 Team
- Securing an IM Norm at the Chicago North American Invitational RR series in 2009
- Placing third at the prestigious U.S. Women's Championships in 2009 at age 18, held in St. Louis
- Tying for third in the competitive, high-stakes World Open U2400 section in 2010
- First Female Pennsylvania State Champion
- She earned the FIDE Master title in 2011 and prefers to go by this over her Women's International Master title

== Notable games ==
- Melekhina won one of the best game prizes for her win over WGM Tatev Abrahamyan at the 2009 U.S. Women's Chess Championships as black against the Italian Opening.
- Her win over one of China's top female players as black in the Trompowsky Opening was featured in the print-version of the New York Times.
- One her most notable games is a c3 Sicilian miniature over GM Alexander Shabalov in 2011.
- In December of that year she beat GM and US Women's Champion Irina Krush on the black side of the rare Bg4 line of the King's Indian Defense
- Melekhina's favorite tournament game is a win in the same c3 Sicilian line where she sacrificed a bishop and rook to get a fatal mating attack, forcing her opponent to give up his queen.
- Melekhina played the Blumenfeld Gambit against Irina Krush in round 6 of the 2014 US Women's Championships, leading to an exciting draw with several exchange sacrifices.

== Chess videos and publications ==
Melekhina was an inspiration for The Fire, Katherine Neville's sequel to the chess-themed historical fiction The Eight.

Melekhina is a content creator for ichess.net and chess.com. Her instructional videos include topics on the c3 Sicilian, Advanced French, King's Indian Defense, Fighting in the Endgame, Power of the Double Rooks, and Defeating Drawish Players. Her famous video on "How to Win in the c3 Sicilian in 21 Moves or Less," featuring her win over GM Shabalov has received over 160,000 hits on YouTube. Before beginning law school, she co-authored a journal article on whether chess games can be copyrighted.

Melekhina was featured on the cover of the April 2015 edition of Chess Life magazine, authoring an article on "Career Crossroads."

== Professional career ==
Melekhina graduated from Drexel University with a bachelor's degree in Philosophy in only two years at age 19. She began University of Pennsylvania Law School in 2011, and was the youngest in her class at age 20. While at law school she founded an Eastern European Law Students Association (EELSA) affinity group. After graduating law school, Melekhina is now a litigation associate practicing in white-collar and intellectual property litigation at Debevoise & Plimpton LLP in New York City. She previously founded SubLite: a portal for student summer sublets and internships.
