= Annie Wang (chess player) =

American chess player (born 2002)

Personal information
- Born: May 18, 2002 (age 24) La Cañada Flintridge, California, U.S.

Chess career
- Country: United States
- Title: International Master (2019); Woman Grandmaster (2019)
- FIDE rating: 2365 (September 2024)
- Peak rating: 2392 (March 2020)

Annie Wang (born May 18, 2002) is an American chess player and an International Master. In 2021, she became the US Girls' Junior Champion, and in 2018, she was the runner-up in the U.S. Women's Chess Championship.

== Career ==
Wang started playing chess when she was five years old after she was introduced to the game at a local park exhibition. In 2014, at the age of 11, she broke Irina Krush's record for the youngest female national master in the United States. Later that year, she won the 2014 North American Youth Chess Championship for girls under 18 with a score of 7½/9, earning the FIDE title of Woman International Master.

Wang competed in the U.S. Women's Chess Championship for the first time in 2015; she scored 3½/11, finishing in 9th. In 2017, she won the gold medal at the 2017 World Youth Chess Championship U16 girls with a performance rating of 2589. Her final score of 10½/11 was two points clear of the runner up. In 2018, Wang placed second at the U.S. Women's Chess Championship. She scored 8/11 to tie for first, but lost the title to Nazi Paikidzi in a playoff match. She competed in the 2019 U.S. Women's Chess Championship and scored 7/11, finishing in 4th. In August 2019, at the age of 16, she won the open section of the Pan-American Junior Under-20 Championship in Cochabamba, Bolivia, earning her the title of International Master, as well as her first GM norm. In 2020, she placed 9th in the U.S. Women's Chess Championship with a score of 4/11. In 2021, Wang won the U.S. Junior Girls' Championship with a score of 7/9, a point ahead of the field. In 2023, Wang played on Board 4 for Team USA in the FIDE Women's Team Championship, helping Team USA reach the semifinals.

Wang currently attends Massachusetts Institute of Technology and is projected to graduate in 2024.
