= Jennifer Yu =

Jennifer Yu may refer to:

- Jennifer Yu (actress) (Chinese: 余香凝, born 1993), Hong Kong actress
- Jennifer Yu (chess player) (Chinese: 于润荷, born 2002), American chess player
- Jennifer Yu Cheng (Chinese: 余雅穎, born 1981), Hong Kong business-woman
