= Clark Magnet High School =

Clark Magnet High School may refer to:

- Anderson W. Clark Magnet High School - Glendale, California (Los Angeles area)
- Michele Clark Magnet High School - Chicago
