= Alexey Root =

American chess player (born 1965)

Personal information
- Born: July 24, 1965 (age 61)

Chess career
- Country: United States
- Title: Woman International Master (1990)
- Peak rating: 2080 (January 1990)

Alexey Wilhelmina Root (née Rudolph, born 1965) is an American chess player, teacher, and writer, who was the 1989 U.S. Women's Chess Champion. She holds the title of Woman International Master, and received a Ph.D. degree from UCLA.

Root is Senior Lecturer in Interdisciplinary Studies at the University of Texas at Dallas, and has written seven books on the relationship between chess and education.

She is also Research Awards Coordinator at Chessable and writes for SparkChess.com.

== Bibliography ==
- Children and Chess: A Guide for Educators. Libraries Unlimited. 2006. ISBN 978-1591583585.
- Science, Math, Checkmate: 32 Chess Activities for Inquiry and Problem Solving. Libraries Unlimited. 2008. ISBN 978-1591585718.
- Read, Write, Checkmate: Enrich Literacy with Chess Activities. Libraries Unlimited. 2009. ISBN 978-1591587545.
- People, Places, Checkmates: Teaching Social Studies with Chess. Libraries Unlimited. 2010. ISBN 978-1591588504.
- Living Chess Game, The: Fine Arts Activities for Kids 9-14. Libraries Unlimited. 2010. ISBN 978-1598843804.
- Thinking with Chess: Teaching Children Ages 5-14. Mongoose Press. 2015. ISBN 978-1936277360.
- United States Women's Chess Champions, 1937-2020. McFarland. 2022. ISBN 978-1476686936.

Preceded by Anna Akhsharumova	U.S. Women's Chess Champion; 1989	Succeeded by Elena Donaldson
