= Anya Corke =

English chess player

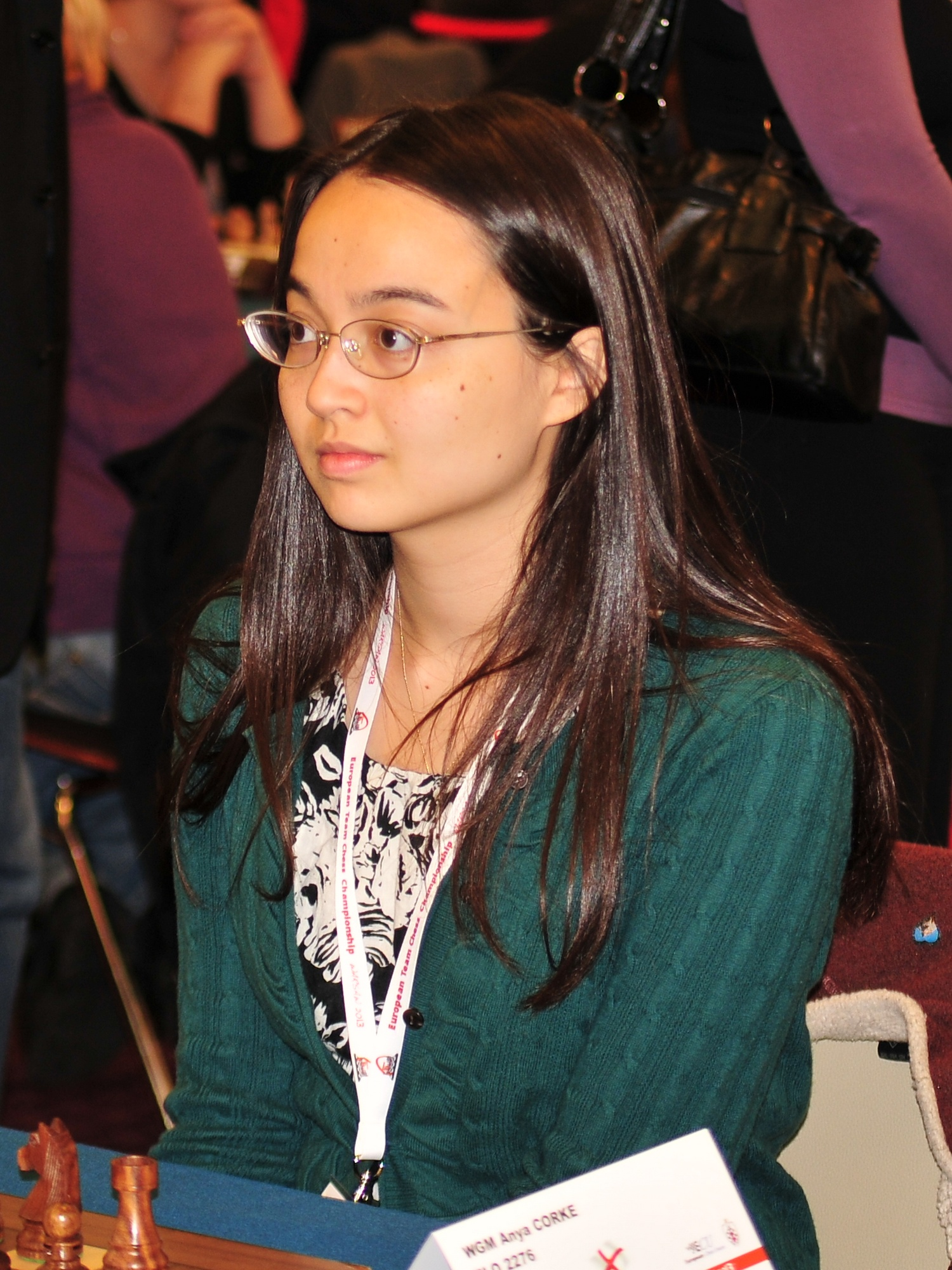
- Anya Corke, Warsaw 2013

Personal information
- Born: Anya Sun Corke; 12 September 1990 (age 35) California, United States

Chess career
- Country: Hong Kong (until 2009); England (since 2009)
- Title: Woman Grandmaster (2004)
- Peak rating: 2301 (October 2008)

Anya Sun Corke (born 12 September 1990 in California, USA) is an American-born English chess player holding the title of Woman Grandmaster (WGM). She played for Hong Kong, where she was the top ranked chess player, until 2009.

== Career ==
Corke earned the WGM title with her performance in the 36th Chess Olympiad, playing for the Hong Kong men's team.

She was the 2004, 2005, 2006 and 2008 Hong Kong National Champion (for men and women), one of the youngest national champions ever at the age of 13 years and 9 months.

She was the British Junior Under-11 Champion in 2002 and the Under-12 Champion in 2003, the first girl to win either of these age groups. In 2004, she became joint British U-14 Champion.

In December 2004, she won the Asian Youth Girls U-14 Championship in Singapore.

In August 2005, she jointly won with Alisa Melekhina and Abby Marshall the second annual Susan Polgar National Invitational for Girls under-19.

Corke represented the England Women's team at the 2012 Chess Olympiad in Istanbul, Turkey, and the 2013 European Team Championship in Warsaw, Poland.

== Personal life and education ==
In 2013, Corke graduated from Wellesley College summa cum laude with a B.A. in Russian and Philosophy.

In 2014, she started a Ph.D. program in Slavic Languages and Literatures at Yale University. She obtained an M.A. and M.Phil Slavic Languages and Literatures (specializing in Russian).

In 2019, Corke started the J.D. program at Yale Law School.

Corke is married and lives in the United States with her husband.

== Media ==
Her photograph was misappropriated by supporters of Barisan Nasional, the ruling political party of Malaysia, to depict the victim in a controversy alleging sexual misconduct by the son of Lim Guan Eng, who is one of the leaders of DAP, a Malaysian opposition party. DAP and their supporters then contacted Anya Corke to obtain an official denial that she knows Lim Guan Eng's son; she confirmed that the allegations were false, and that the photo was used without her knowledge or consent. The original photo used in this controversy was stolen from an article on the website ChessBase News, and had the chess board cropped out.
