= Diane Savereide =

American chess player (born 1954)

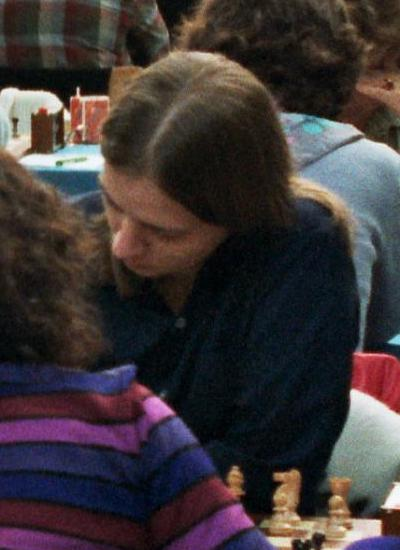
- Savereide in 1982

Personal information
- Born: November 25, 1954 (age 71) Albuquerque, New Mexico, U.S.

Chess career
- Country: United States
- Title: Woman International Master (1978)
- Peak rating: 2280 (January 1987)

Diane Savereide (born November 25, 1954) is an American chess player. She received the FIDE title of Woman International Master (WIM) in 1978 and is a five-time winner of the U.S. Women's Chess Championship (1975, 1976, 1978, 1981, 1984).

== Biography ==
Savereide grew up in Culver City, California and attended UCLA as an undergraduate.

From the 1970s to the 1980s, Savereide was one of the leading chess players in the United States. She is the second American woman to achieve the National Master title, Gisela Kahn Gresser being the first. Savereide won the Marshall Chess Club Women's Invitational in 1976 and 1977. She won the United States Women's Chess Championships five times, in 1975, 1976, 1978 (with Rachel Crotto), 1981 and 1984. In 1978, Savereide was awarded the FIDE Woman International Master (WIM) title.

Savereide played for United States in the Women's Chess Olympiads: six times:

- In 1976, on first board in the 7th Chess Olympiad (women) in Haifa (+4, =3, -3),
- In 1978, on first board in the 8th Chess Olympiad (women) in Buenos Aires (+6, =1, -4),
- In 1980, on first board in the 9th Chess Olympiad (women) in Valletta (+4, =3, -5),
- In 1982, on first board in the 10th Chess Olympiad (women) in Lucerne (+4, =4, -4),
- In 1984, on first board in the 26th Chess Olympiad (women) in Thessaloniki (+5, =4, -4),
- In 1988, on second board in the 28th Chess Olympiad (women) in Thessaloniki (+5, =4, -4).

Savereide participated in the Women's World Chess Championship Interzonal Tournaments four times:

- In 1976, at the Interzonal Tournament in Tbilisi, finishing in 10th place;
- In 1979, at the Interzonal Tournament in Alicante, finishing in 5th place;
- In 1982, at the Interzonal Tournament in Tbilisi, finishing in shared 13th-14th place;
- In 1985, at the Interzonal Tournament in Havana, finishing in 10th place.

She married New Zealand chess player Philip Alan Clemance, but they later divorced. From 1989 Savereide gave up chess and worked as a computer programmer with NASA and then as a software developer in Los Angeles. Savereide was inducted into the U.S. Chess Hall of Fame in 2010.
