= Anjelina Belakovskaia =

American chess player (born 1969)

Personal information
- Born: Anjelina Mikhailovna Belakovskaia; May 17, 1969 (age 57) Odesa, Ukrainian SSR, Soviet Union (now Ukraine)

Chess career
- Country: United States
- Title: Woman Grandmaster (1993)
- Peak rating: 2385 (January 1998)

Anjelina Mikhailovna Belakovskaia (Note: Ukrainian: Анжеліна Михайлівна Белаковська, romanized: Anzhelina Mikhailovna Belakovska) (born May 17, 1969) is an American chess player holding the FIDE title of Woman Grandmaster (WGM). She is a three-time U.S. women's champion, with victories in 1995, 1996, and 1999.

== Biography ==
Belakovskaia grew up in Odesa, Ukraine, and is a graduate of the Odesa Agricultural University. She came to the United States to play competitive chess. She recalls flying from Moscow to New York City and arriving with little money and knowing only a few English words. Belakovskaia's first job in the United States was slicing watermelons and winning money from the chess hustlers at Washington Square Park. She won $35 the first day, and soon the hustlers would no longer play her because they had lost too much money. Belakovskaia had a brief cameo in the movie Searching for Bobby Fischer in 1993.

Belakovskaia became a naturalized U.S. citizen on November 24, 1999. Later that year, she began graduate work at New York University, and in 2001 earned a Master's Degree in Mathematics in Finance.

Soon after, she got a position as a trader at Williams Cos. in Tulsa, Oklahoma in weather derivatives. In May 2001, Belakovskaia became the head of the Weather Derivatives desk at Williams EM&T (Energy, Marketing, and Trading). There, she was recognized as Best Female Employee for her contribution to the company's success.

Since January 2011, Belakovskaia has taught finance classes at the Eller College of Management at The University of Arizona. In 2012, she became a member of the American Meteorological Society Committee on Financial Weather/Climate Risk Management. In 2013, she became an honors professor, adding the "Chess, Leadership and Business Strategy" course at UA Honors College to her course load.

In January 2016, Anjelina Belakovskaia began teaching at Thunderbird School of Global Management, Arizona State University, where she is now an Associate Teaching Professor in Global Finance.

Since 2022, Anjelina has served as Faculty Advisor of the Crypto Club at Thunderbird and has become deeply engaged in the field of Artificial Intelligence. She currently chairs the AI and Emerging Technology Committee at Thunderbird and was instrumental in launching the ASU Downtown AI Community of Practice. This initiative fosters interdisciplinary collaboration through monthly AI/Tech Talks at Thunderbird, open to ASU faculty, staff, students, and alumni, as well as various conferences and campus-wide events.

At the university level, Anjelina has contributed to strategic discussions on AI Literacy and the evolving Future of Work by exploring the skills that future leaders, executives, and professionals will need in a rapidly changing world shaped by AI and emerging technologies.

== Chess career ==
In July 1991, she came to the U.S. to play in the Chess World Open in Philadelphia.

In 1993, she was awarded the FIDE Woman Grandmaster title (WGM). Belakovskaia won the New York Women's Chess Championship three times and played on the U.S. team in the Chess Olympiads in 1994, 1996, and 1998.

In 1995, she won the first of her three US Women's Chess Championship titles, tying for first with Sharon Burtman. The next year, she won the title outright. In 1997, she took second place in the US Women's Championship. In 1999 she became champion for the third time. Her third tournament was won through her "superior grasp of the middle game."

In 2000, Belakovskaia was Honored by Howard Golden - president of Brooklyn, City of New York - for superlative skills and outstanding achievement.

In 2010, Belakovskaia started a chess program for children in Tucson, Arizona. She is also a member of the FIDE Chess in Schools commission. In 2013, she coordinated an all girls' chess tournament in Tucson during the month of April.

In 2023, Belakovskaia won the Inaugural U.S. Chess Championship for Women 50+, and in 2023 and 2024, she led the U.S. Women’s 50+ Team to Silver and Bronze medals at the World Senior Team Chess Championships in Krakow and Prague, respectively.

== Notable game ==
For the US Women's Chess Championship Anjelina Belakovskaia (white) played the following game against Ivona Jezierska (King's Indian opening):
1.d4 g6 2.c4 Bg7 3.Nc3 d6 4.e4 Nf6 5.f3 0-0 6.Nge2 e5 7.Bg5 h6 8.Be3 Nbd7 9.Qd2 Kh7 10.d5 Nh5 11.g4 Nf4 12.Nf4 ef 13.Bf4 Ne5 14.Be2 a6 15.g5 Bh3 16.Rg1 hg 17.Bg5 Qd7 18.f4 Ng4 19.Qd3 Nf6 20.f5 (1-0)

== See also ==
- List of Jewish chess players

== Notes ==
| Preceded by Elena Donaldson; Irina Krush | U.S. Women's Chess Champion; 1995-1996; 1999 | Succeeded by Esther Epstein; Elina Groberman - Camilla Baginskaite |
