= Elena Donaldson-Akhmilovskaya =

American chess player (1957–2012)

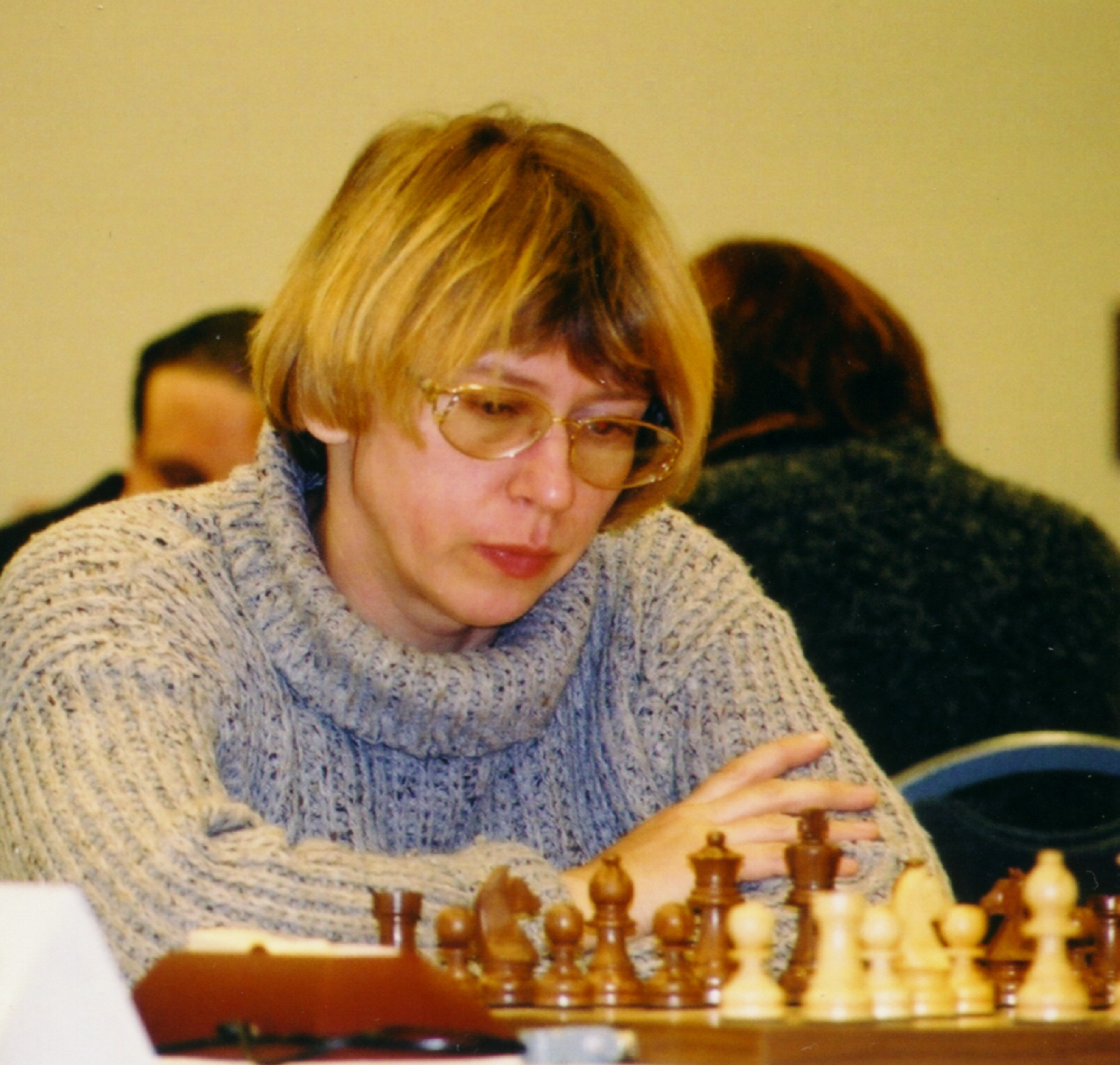
- Donaldson at the 2003 U.S. Chess Championships

Personal information
- Born: Elena Bronislavovna Akhmilovskaya; 11 March 1957 Leningrad, Soviet Union
- Died: 18 November 2012 (aged 55) Kirkland, Washington, U.S.
- Spouses: John Donaldson (m. 1988; div. 1989) Georgi Orlov (m. 1995)

Chess career
- Country: Soviet Union (before 1989); United States (after 1989)
- Title: Woman Grandmaster (1977)
- Peak rating: 2435 (January 1987)

Elena Donaldson-Akhmilovskaya (born Elena Bronislavovna Akhmilovskaya, Russian: Елена Брониславовна Ахмыловская; 11 March 1957 – 18 November 2012) was an American chess player. She was awarded the title of Woman Grandmaster by FIDE in 1977. She won the Women Candidates' tournament in 1986 and later in the same year played a match against Maia Chiburdanidze in Sofia for the Women's World Championship title, but lost by 8½–5½.

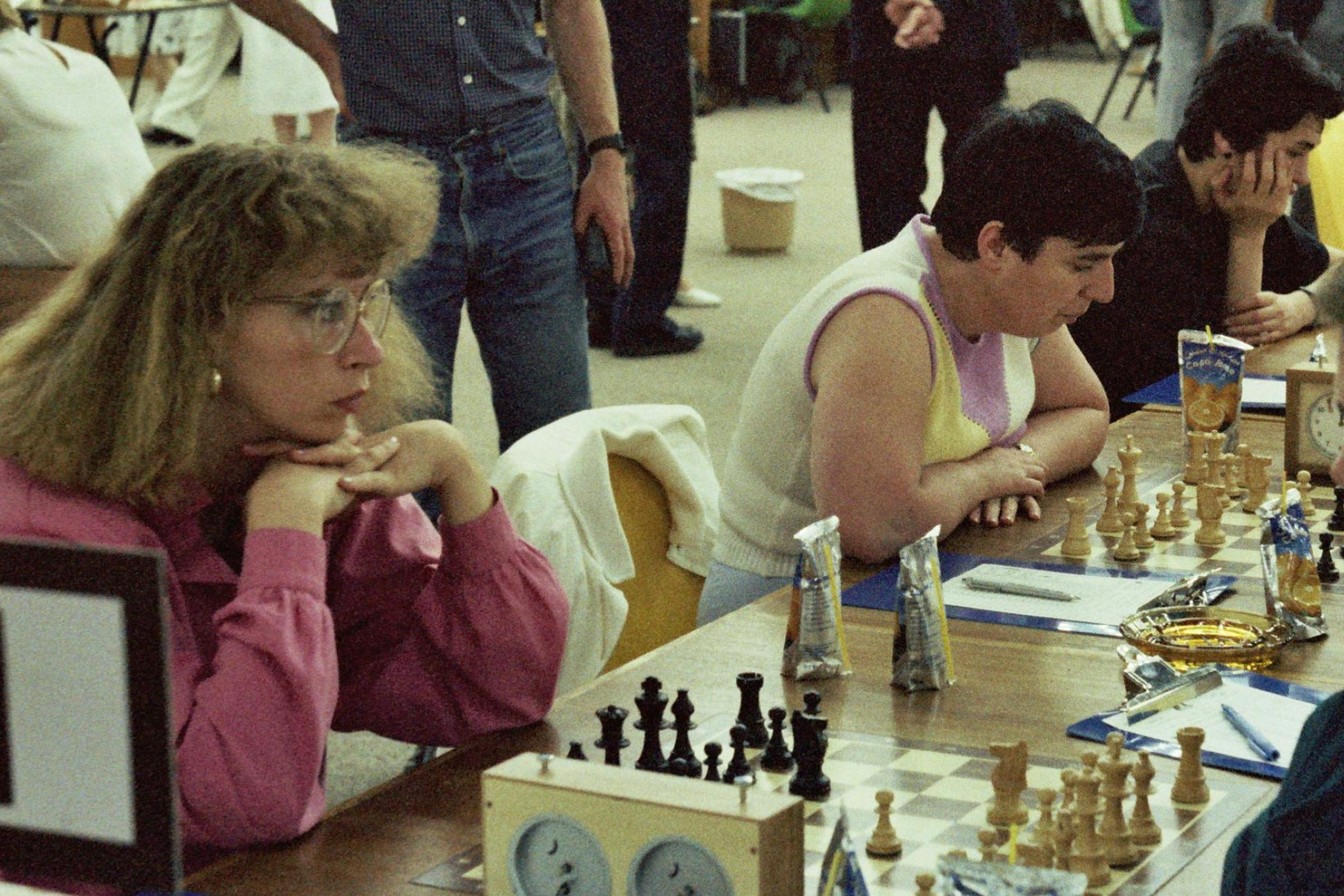
Akhmilovskaya, Gaprindashvili, and Alexandria at Chess Olympiad 1986

Donaldson-Akhmilovskaya was born in Leningrad in a family where all members played chess. In 1969 the family moved to Krasnoyarsk, where she started playing chess in the local Pioneers Palace chess circle. She lived in Sochi, then in Tbilisi, Georgia from 1979 until 1988, when she abruptly eloped to the United States by marrying U.S. team captain John Donaldson at the Chess Olympiad in Thessaloniki, Greece.

She lived in the Seattle area with her new husband, Georgi Orlov (himself an International Master), and their son after 1990. Her daughter from a previous marriage also lived in Seattle. She won the U.S. Women's Chess Championship in 1990 and 1994 and tied for the championship in 1993.

In 2010, she was awarded the title of FIDE Instructor. She died of brain cancer in 2012 in Kirkland, Washington.

Achievements
Preceded by Alexey Root	U.S. Women's Chess Champion; 1990	Succeeded by Esther Epstein and Irina Levitina
Preceded by Irina Levitina	U.S. Women's Chess Champion; 1993 (with Irina Levitina) and 1994	Succeeded by Anjelina Belakovskaia and Sharon Burtman
