= Bodhana Sivanandan =

English chess player (born 2015)

- Sivanandan in 2026

Personal information
- Born: 7 March 2015 (age 11) London, England

Chess career
- Country: England
- Title: FIDE Master (2026); Woman International Master (2025)
- FIDE rating: 2414 (November 2026)
- Peak rating: 2414 (November 2026)

Bodhana Sivanandan (born 7 March 2015) is an English chess player who holds the titles of FIDE Master (FM) and Woman International Master (WIM). She holds the records for the youngest girl in history to become a Woman Grandmaster (WGM) and the youngest girl to become an International Master (IM), both of which she achieved in 2026 and both are pending formal confirmation from the International Chess Federation (FIDE).

== Chess career ==
Sivanandan began playing chess during lockdown in 2020. In 2022 she said "I love to play chess because it helps me to recognize patterns, focus my attention and is helping me to learn how to strategise and calculate moves in advance. Also, I like the way the chess pieces move on the board, especially the knight." In March 2022, 15 months after learning the game, Sivanandan was described by English chess journalist Leonard Barden as "exceptional". He wrote, "Bodhana Sivanandan, who won silver medals in both the rapid and blitz European under-8 girls, is world No 1 girl in blitz in her age group by a whopping margin of 322 Fide points" and "Sivanandan's medals in Serbia match Houska's fifth place on her debut in the 1988 world girls U10".

In the European Schools age group championships held in Rhodes in May 2022, Sivanandan won all 24 games she played and gained three gold medals. Sivanandan took part in the British Chess Championship in Torquay in August 2022. Leonard Barden, writing in The Guardian, described her play in the Open Rapid competition as "an eye-catching performance": she was the youngest contestant, and after two wins and a draw she defeated the current U12 champion, before being defeated by grandmaster Keith Arkell who said "I won only because of her inexperience".

In 2023 she defeated former British chess champion Peter Lee, in an exhibition match. Later that year, at the age of eight, Sivanandan scored 8.5/13 in the 2023 European Blitz chess championship in December 2023. She won the under-12 and women's prizes at that championship, as well as being its top English player. However, no player was allowed more than one prize; she chose the women's prize. International Master Lawrence Trent wrote on Twitter on December 13, 2023: "The maturity of her play, her sublime touch, it's truly breath taking. ... I have no doubt she will be England's greatest player and most likely one of the greatest the game has ever seen". In 2023 she became a Woman Candidate Master.

In March 2024 she was the world no. 1 under-10 girl. In July 2024, Sivanandan was selected for England's women's team for the 45th Chess Olympiad, in Budapest, Hungary in September. This made her the youngest person to ever be chosen for a full England team in any sport. At that Olympiad, she won her first game and followed up with two losses, two draws, and one loss. In November 2024, she won the top place in the Girls Under 18s category of the UK Chess Challenge. In 2024 she became a Woman FIDE Master.

In July 2025, at age ten, she became the youngest chess player to earn a Woman Grandmaster norm; the previous youngest to do so was Hou Yifan as an 11-year-old in 2005. In August 2025, she defeated grandmaster Peter Wells in the British Chess Championship, becoming the youngest girl to defeat a grandmaster, beating Carissa Yip's record by over 6 months. The win also gave her the final norm needed to become a Woman International Master, making her the youngest ever to earn that title. She went on to defeat the former women's world chess champion and grandmaster Mariya Muzychuk at the European Chess Club Cup in October 2025. In November 2025, Sivanandan won the UK Women’s Blitz Championship.

In January 2026, she had eight draws and three wins at the European Women's Rapid Championship, with a final score of 7/11, finishing in twentieth place out of 143 players in the tournament. In March 2026, she shared first prize at the British Women's Rapidplay Championships, and had four wins in the Reykjavik Open. On 1 April 2026, an update to the FIDE rankings made her Britain’s top-rated female chess player. In July of that year, at eleven years and four months old, she became the youngest girl to defeat a grandmaster rated over 2600, by defeating Marc’Andria Maurizzi. In that same month she also became the youngest girl to achieve an International Master norm, surpassing Judit Polgár’s record of doing so at age eleven years and nine months in 1988. In August 2026, she became the youngest ever Women's British Chess Champion, beating Trisha Kanyamarala 1½ - ½ in a rapid playoff after both players finished on 5½/9 in the main championship. In the 46th Chess Olympiad in September of that year, she earned her third Woman Grandmaster norm, making her the youngest ever Woman Grandmaster, and earned her second International Master norm; also in that Olympiad she earned eight points across eleven games, playing on England’s top board. In October 2026 she played for the Hamburger SK's men's team in the Second Bundesliga. She was the youngest player ever to play in the German Bundesliga, and her score in the two games she played was 1½ points. Later that month she earned her third International Master norm and became the youngest ever female International Master at 11 years, 7 months, and 16 days, surpassing Judit Polgár’s record of becoming the youngest ever female International Master at age twelve in 1988. In 2026 she also became a FIDE master.

== Personal life ==
Sivanandan's parents moved from Tiruchirappalli, Tamil Nadu, India, to the United Kingdom in 2007. Sivanandan was born in London on 7 March 2015. She lives in Harrow.
