= Gisela Kahn Gresser =

American chess player (1906–2000)

Personal information
- Born: February 8, 1906 Detroit, Michigan
- Died: December 4, 2000 (aged 94) New York City

Chess career
- Country: United States
- Title: Woman International Master (1950)
- Peak rating: 2100 (January 1987)

Gisela Kahn Gresser (February 8, 1906 – December 4, 2000) was an American chess player. She dominated women's chess in the United States, winning the U.S. Women's Chess Championship nine times from 1944 to 1969.

== Chess career ==
Gresser learned chess at a very late age. On a cruise from France to New York in the late 1930s, she borrowed a chess manual from a fellow passenger and taught herself how to play. By the end of the cruise, she was hooked. In 1938, she was a spectator at the first U.S. Women's Chess Championship tournament, organized by Caroline Marshall (wife of US Champion Frank Marshall) and held at the Rockefeller Center in New York City (won by Adele Rivero). She first played in the championship in 1940, and in 1944 she won it with a perfect score. She won it again in 1948 (with Mona May Karff), 1955 (with Nancy Roos), 1957 (with Sonja Graf), 1962, 1965, 1966 (with Lisa Lane), 1967, and 1969 (at age 63).

In addition to her repeated successes in the U.S. Women's Chess Championship, Gresser also played in the Women's World Chess Championship tournament of 1949–50, and subsequently in six Women's World Championship cycles: five Candidates' tournaments (1955, 1959, 1961, 1964, and 1967) and one Interzonal tournament (1971). She played for the U.S. team in three Women's Chess Olympiads (1957, 1963, and 1966). She won the 1954 U.S. Women's Open Championship. In April 1963, she became the first woman in the United States to gain a master title, with a rating of 2211.

She also wrote an article for the October 1950 issue of Ladies Home Journal, entitled "I Went to Moscow". Mrs. Gresser (Mrs. was her preferred title) took lessons from International Master Hans Kmoch and Grandmaster Arthur Bisguier.

She was (with Karff) one of the first three female chess players in the United States, and one of the first seventeen players in the world, to be awarded the title of Woman International Master in 1950 when FIDE created official titles. She was also the first woman to be inducted into the U.S. Chess Hall of Fame, which happened in 1992.

== Personal life ==
Gresser was born in Detroit and studied classics at Radcliffe. She won a prestigious Charles Elliott Norton fellowship, which she used to continue her studies at the American School of Classical Studies in Athens, Greece. In 1927, she returned to New York, where she married William Gresser, a New York City attorney and musicologist, who died in 1982. She was a housewife, and raised their two sons, Ion and Julian. Gresser was an accomplished painter and musician, as well as a classical scholar. She went on safari many times, even in her eighties.

== Notable games ==
=== Gresser vs. Karff, New York 1944 ===
Gresser (White) defeats her main rival for the U.S. Women's Chess Championship. The game was annotated by Edward Lasker for Chess Review.
1.e4 c5 2.Nf3 e6 3.d4 cxd4 4.Nxd4 Nf6 5. Nc3 Bb4 6. e5! Nd5 7. Bd2 Bxc3? Leaving the kingside unprotected by a minor piece. 8.bxc3 Qc7 9.f4 Nxc3 10.Qg4 Stronger was 10.Qf3 Nd5 11.Nb5 Qc5 12.Nd6+ Kf8 13.Qh5 g6 14.Qh6+ Kg8 15.c4 followed by Ne4 and Nf6. 10... O-O 11.Bd3 Nd5 12.c4 f5 13.Qh4 Qc5! 14.Nb3 Qe7! 15.Qh3 Nb4 16.Bb1 N8c6 17.a3 Na6 18.O-O! 18.g4 g6 19.Rg1 d6 defends and counterattacks. 18... d6 Probably better was 18... b6, followed by ... Nc5, ... Ba6, and ... Rac8. 19.exd6 Qxd6 20.Bc3 Nc5 21. Bc2 Nxb3 22.Bxb3 Re8 23.Qg3 Qc7 24.Kh1 Re7 Black could consider 24... e5 giving back the pawn. 25.Rad1 Bd7 26.Rd3! Rae8 26... e5 does not work after 27.c5+ Kh8 28.fxe5 Nxe5 29.Rxd7; or 27... Be6 28.Be6+ Rxe6 29.fxe5 Nxe5 30.Rd6! 27.Rfd1 Bc8 28.c5 Kh8 29.Ba4! Rd8? 30.Qh4 30.Rxd8+ Nxd8 31.Be5 Qa5 32.Qg5 wins material immediately. 30... Rxd3? Lasker at first recommended 30... Red7 because White only gets perpetual check after 31.Bxg7+ Kxg7 32.Rg3+ Kf8. Subsequently, he acknowledged that, as pointed out by Frank Marshall and Harold Phillips, White could keep good winning chances with 31.Qh5! Rxd3 32. Rxd3 Kg8 33. Rg3. 31.Rxd3 Rd7 White was threatening 32.Bxc6 bxc6 33.Be5, or if 32... Qxc6 33.Rd8+ Re8 34.Qe7! 32 Rh3 h6 33 Qxh6 1-0 Black resigned.

=== Gresser vs. Rudenko, Moscow 1949-50 ===
Gresser (White) hands Lyudmila Rudenko, who won the Eighth Women's World Championship in this event with 11½ points out of 15 games (+9 =5 -1), her only defeat.
1.e4 e5 2.Nf3 Nc6 3.Bb5 Bc5 4.c3 f5 5.d4 fxe4 6.dxc5 exf3 7.Qxf3 Nf6 8.Bg5 O-O 9.O-O Qe7 10.Bc4+ Kh8 11.b4 a5 12.Bxf6 Rxf6 13.Qd5 Rf8 14.b5 Nd8 15.Nd2 c6 16.Qd6 Qxd6 17.cxd6 b6 18.Rfe1 cxb5 19.Bxb5 Nf7 20.Nc4 Ba6 21.Bxa6 Rxa6 22.Nxe5 Nxd6 23.Nxd7 Rc8 24.Rad1 b5 25.h3 Nf7 26.Re7 Kg8 27.Rde1 Nd6 28.R1e6 Rxc3 29.Ne5 h6 30.Rd7 Rc5 31.Nf7 Nxf7 32.Rxa6 Ne5 33.Rb7 b4 34.Raa7 Nc6 35.Rxg7+ Kf8 36.Raf7+ Ke8 37.Rb7 Rf5 38.Rg8+ Rf8 39.Rxf8+ Kxf8 40.Rb6 Ne5 41.Rxh6 1-0
