= Mona May Karff =

American chess player (1908–1998)

Personal information
- Born: October 20, 1908 Sokyriany, Bessarabia, Russia
- Died: January 10, 1998 (aged 89) Manhattan, New York, United States

Chess career
- Country: United States (after 1938); Palestine (before 1938)
- Title: Woman International Master (1950)
- Peak rating: 2135 (January 1990)

Mona May Karff (née Minna Ratner; 20 October 1908 – 10 January 1998) was an American chess player. She dominated U.S. women's chess in the 1940s and early 1950s: she held seven U.S. Women's Chess Champion titles and four consecutive U.S. Open titles.

== Chess career ==
Karff played in three Women's World Chess Championships: 1937 Stockholm, playing for Palestine and placing sixth (won by Vera Menchik); 1939 Buenos Aires, playing for the U.S. and placing 5th (also won by Menchik); 1949 Moscow, playing for the U.S. (won by Lyudmila Rudenko). When FIDE established titles in 1950, Mona May Karff was one of three American women to receive the title of International Woman Master.

Karff, along with Gisela Kahn Gresser and Mary Bain, dominated U.S. women's chess in the 1940s and early 1950s. Mona May Karff won her first U.S. Women's Chess Champion title ahead of Mary Bain and Adele Rivero in 1938. She competed and won the title six more times, in 1941, 1943, 1946, 1948 (sharing it with Gresser), 1953 and in 1974 (at age 66). She also won four consecutive U.S. Open titles: 1938, 1939, 1948, and 1950 (shared with Lucille Kellner).

== Personal life ==
Karff was born in Sokyriany, Bessarabia, then a province in Tsarist Russia. Sometime after the Bolshevik Revolution of 1917, her family moved to Tel Aviv, in what was then Palestine. Her father, Aviv Ratner, a wealthy Jewish land-owner, had taught her to play chess when she was 9 years old. Because of her natural ability, she started playing in tournaments in Tel Aviv and developed into a strong player.

In 1930, she moved to Boston and became a U.S. citizen, aged 21. There she met and married her cousin, an attorney named Abraham S. Karff (15 March 1901 – 16 February 1995). The marriage was brief. She never remarried, but her long-time romantic relationship with Edward Lasker (a five-time U.S. Chess Open champion) was not a secret.

Karff was also a stock investor who was worth a small fortune. She spoke eight languages fluently and traveled extensively. As an art lover, she spent a good portion of her fortune on modern art. She died in Manhattan on January 10, 1998.

== See also ==
- List of Jewish chess players
