= Tatev Abrahamyan =

Armenian-American chess player (born 1988)

- Abrahamyan in 2026

Personal information
- Born: January 13, 1988 (age 38) Yerevan, Armenian SSR, Soviet Union

Chess career
- Country: Armenia (until 2002); United States (since 2002)
- Title: International Master (2025); Woman Grandmaster (2011)
- Peak rating: 2407 (September 2025)

Tatev Abrahamyan (Armenian: Տաթև Աբրահամյան; born January 13, 1988) is an Armenian-American chess player. She currently holds the title of International Master (IM).

== Early life and education ==
Abrahamyan moved from Armenia to the United States in 2001. Abrahamyan lives in Glendale, California. She studied at Anderson W. Clark Magnet High School at La Crescenta. She graduated in 2011 from California State University, Long Beach, double majoring in psychology and political science.

== Career ==
Abrahamyan finished in a tie for first place with Nana Dzagnidze and Varvara Kirillova in the Girls U12 section of the 1999 European Youth Chess Championships, and took the bronze medal on tiebreak. She tied for first in the 2005 U.S. Women's Chess Championship and lost the playoff match to Rusudan Goletiani. In 2006, Abrahamyan won the Girls Under 18 section of the Pan American Youth Chess Festival, held in Cuenca, Ecuador, with a perfect score of 9/9 points. In 2008 Abrahamyan won the Goddess Chess Award for her uncompromising play. She tied for second place with Anna Zatonskih in the 2010 U.S. Women's Championship, behind the winner Irina Krush who achieved a score of 8/9, and took second again in 2011 after drawing with Zatonskih in an "Armageddon" tiebreak game. She competed in the Women's World Chess Championship in 2012 and 2015.

In 2025, Abrahamyan scored 7/9 at the Budapest One Week tournament, exceeding the 2400 rating for the first time and qualifying for the International Master title after the penultimate round; she also completed her first grandmaster norm with a draw in the following game.

In team competitions, Abrahamyan has represented the United States in the Women's Chess Olympiad and in the Women's World Team Chess Championship.
