= Lisa Lane =

American chess player (1933–2024)

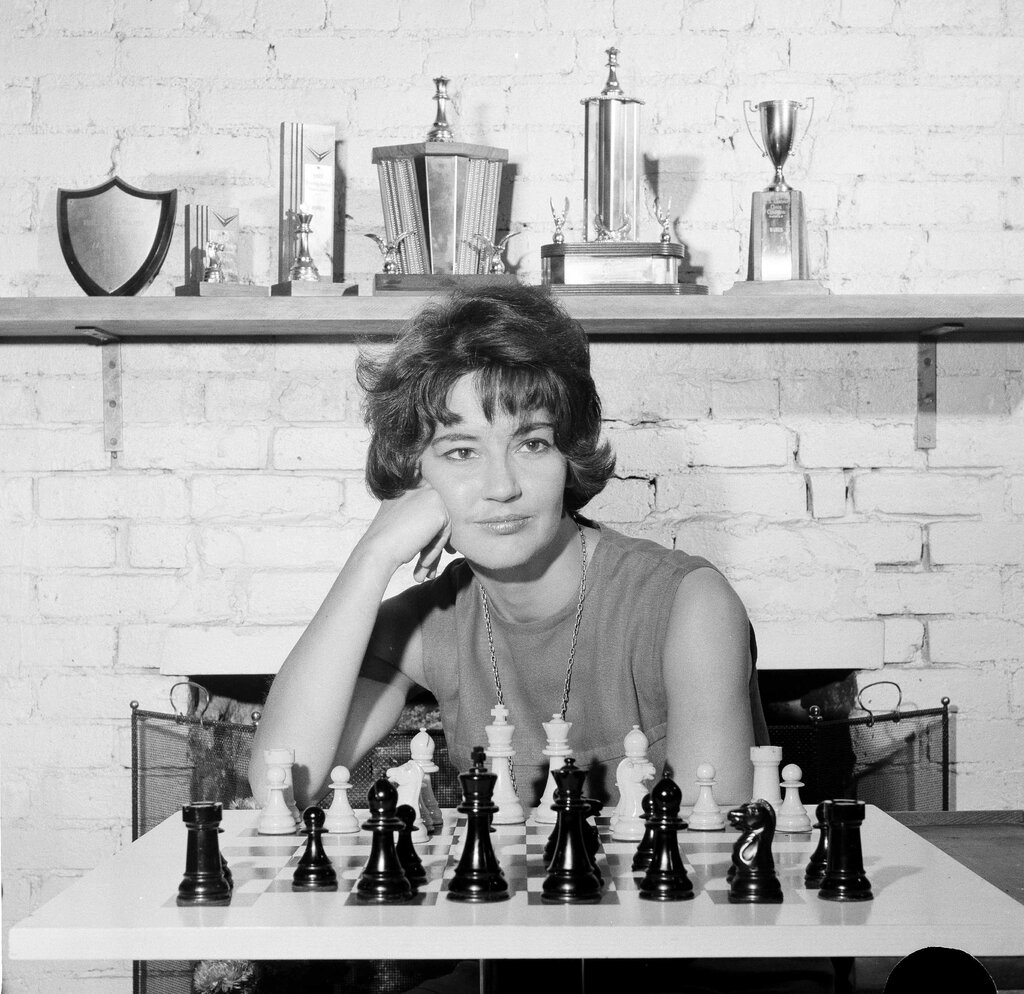

Personal information
- Born: April 25, 1933 Philadelphia, Pennsylvania
- Died: February 28, 2024 (aged 90) Carmel, New York

Chess career
- Title: Woman International Master (1960)

Marianne Elizabeth Lane Hickey (April 25, 1933 – February 28, 2024), also known as Lisa Lane, was an American chess player. She was the U.S. Women's Chess Champion in 1959. She appeared on the cover of Sports Illustrated in the August 7, 1961 edition, making her the first chess player to appear on its cover (Bobby Fischer did so in 1972).

== Early life and chess career ==
Born in Philadelphia, Lane never knew her father, a leather glazer. As a child, she and her sister Evelyn lived with their grandmother and various neighbors while their mother held down two jobs. In 1957, while attending Temple University, Lane struck and killed an elderly woman while driving her mother's car (she was not charged). This, and the end of a love affair, set Lane into a depression.

Lane learned to play chess in her late teens. After investing her savings in a Philadelphia bookstore, she began playing chess at a nearby coffeehouse and others in the neighborhood, "winning all the time", she said. After coaching by master Attilio Di Camillo, Lane won the women's championship of Philadelphia in 1958 and took her first U.S. Women's Chess Championship in 1959 at the age of 26, just two years after she began playing the game. She held this title until 1962, losing it to Gisela Kahn Gresser. Lane had an Elo rating of 2002, a low expert rating, from the United States Chess Federation as of the end of 1961. In 1963, Lane opened her own chess club, The Queen's Pawn Chess Emporium in New York City. In 1966, she shared the U.S. Women's Chess Champion title with Gresser. She competed in the Women's World Championship Tournament twice, in 1962 (joint 12th of 17) and 1965 (12th of 18).

Lane was married twice – first to Walter Rich, a Philadelphia ad man and commercial artist, from 1959 to 1961; then to Neil Hickey, a writer and journalist who eventually became editor-at-large of the Columbia Journalism Review, in 1962. Both Lisa and her husband were friends of Bobby Fischer and assisted Fischer in some chess articles.

== Later life ==
According to two-time U.S. Women's Chess Champion Jennifer Shahade (author of Chess Bitch, a book about women chess players), Lane quit the game partly because she was annoyed with being identified as a chess player. "It got to be embarrassing, constantly being introduced as a chess champion at parties."

In a 2018 interview with Sports Illustrated writer Emma Baccellieri, Lane said, "I felt it would be letting the idea of women’s chess down if I said no [to a man challenging her]", Lane says. "I felt like I was working all the time.... The idea that I was defending my title every time I sat down to play was an unpleasant feeling, even though I wasn’t really defending it. I just couldn’t put the title of women's chess champion on the line every time I sat down to play."

On her fame, Lane said to Shahade, "I guess I was good copy. I don't think the things I did in chess forty years ago are the most important things in my life."

In the 1970s, Lane and her husband opened a health and natural food store called Amber Waves of Grain, in Carmel, New York, which later evolved into a gift shop called Earth Lore Gems & Minerals in Pawling, New York, which in its last years moved to Kent, Connecticut in 2012.

== Television appearances ==
Lane appeared as a contestant on the March 31, 1960, episode of the TV show To Tell the Truth. The four panel members (Polly Bergen, Don Ameche, Kitty Carlisle, and Tom Poston) correctly guessed her identity. She also appeared as a contestant on the May 21, 1961, episode of the TV show What's My Line? and stumped the panel (Dorothy Kilgallen, Arlene Francis, Bennett Cerf, and Abe Burrows). Abe Burrows remarked at the end of the segment that "because she is so pretty, we ruled out anything intellectual."

== Death and eulogies ==
Lane died from cancer on February 28, 2024, at her home in Carmel, New York.

Chess.com noted in their eulogy that "the glamor cut both ways: media often fixated on her physical appearance and personal life, with chess being a secondary point of interest".
