= Esther Epstein =

American chess player (born 1954)

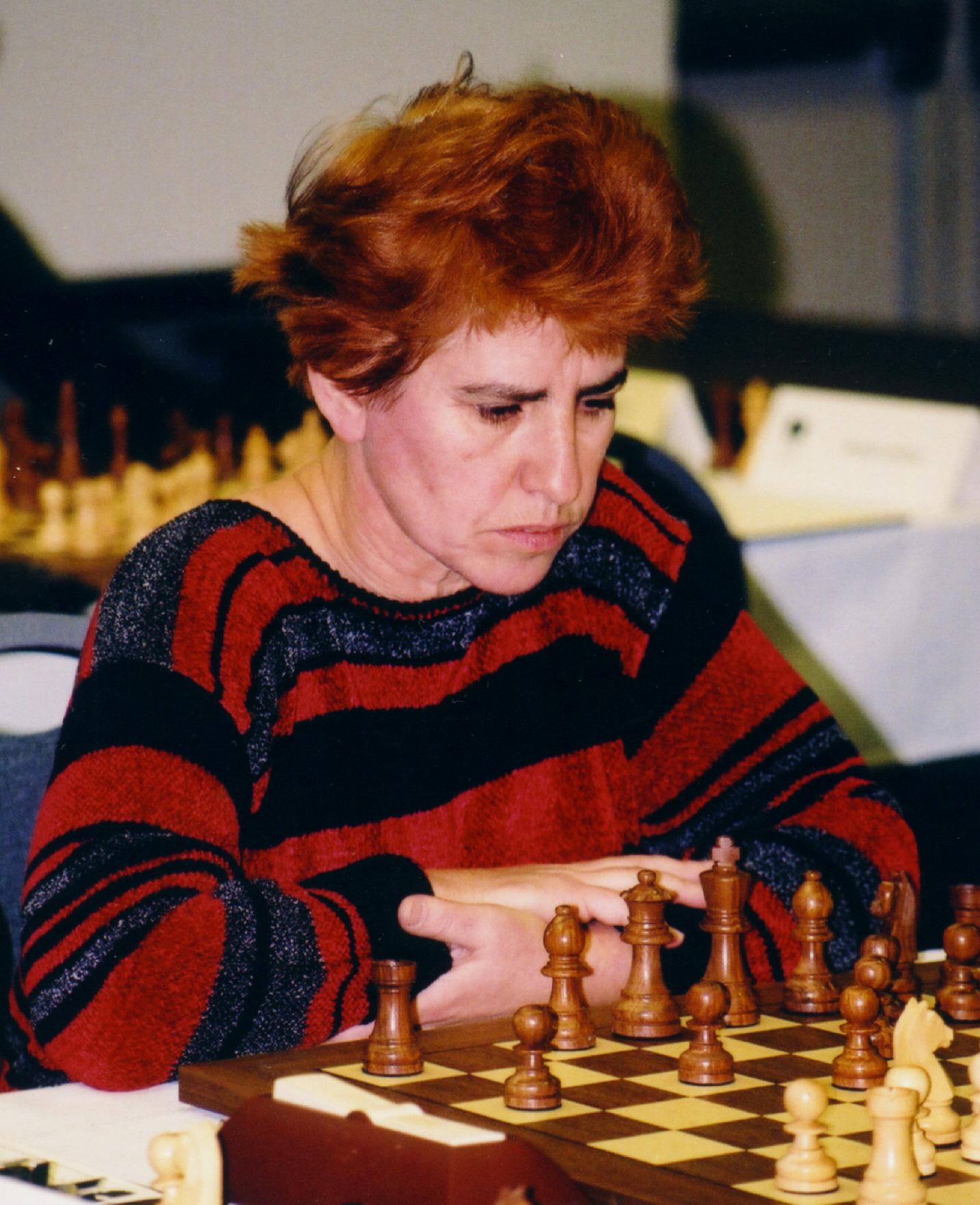
- Epstein in 2003

Personal information
- Born: May 10, 1954 (age 72) Nizhny Novgorod, Russian SFSR, Soviet Union
- Spouse: Alexander Ivanov

Chess career
- Country: United States (after 1988); Soviet Union (before 1988)
- Title: Woman International Master (1972)
- Peak rating: 2305 (January 1977)

Esther Danilovna Epstein (born May 10, 1954) is an American chess player and systems manager, who has won the U.S. Women's Chess Champion in 1991 and 1997. She holds a Woman International Master title.

Still in the USSR, Epstein was the USSR Women's Vice-Champion in 1976. She has played for the U.S. Women's Olympiad team five times.

She is married to chess grandmaster Alexander Ivanov.

Preceded by Elena Donaldson	U.S. Women's Chess Champion; 1991 (with Irina Levitina)	Succeeded by Irina Levitina

Preceded by Anjelina Belakovskaia	U.S. Women's Chess Champion; 1997	Succeeded by Irina Krush
