= Rachel Crotto =

American chess player (1958–2025)

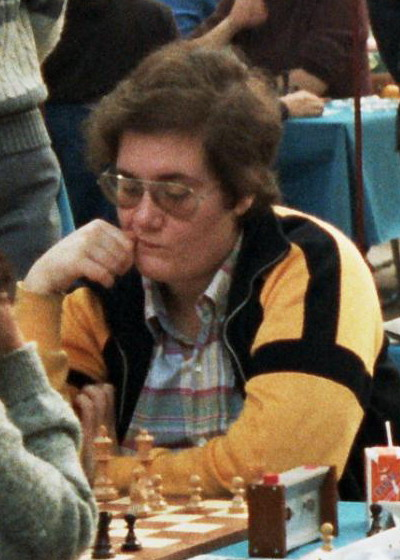
- Crotto in 1982

Personal information
- Born: December 25, 1958 New York City, U.S.
- Died: June 4, 2025 (aged 66)

Chess career
- Country: United States
- Title: Woman International Master (1978)
- Peak rating: 2135 (January 1987)

Rachel Crotto (December 25, 1958 – June 4, 2025) was an American chess player who held the title of Woman International Master (WIM, 1978). She was a two-time winner of the U.S. Women's Chess Championship (1978, 1979).

== Biography ==
From the 1970s to the 1980s, Crotto was one of the leading female chess players in the United States. She played in her first United States Women's Championship at the age of 12. She twice won the United States Women's Chess Championships, in 1978 (with Diane Savereide) and in 1979. In 1978, Crotto was awarded the FIDE Woman International Master (WIM) title.

Crotto played for United States in the Women's Chess Olympiads:

- In 1976, at second board in the 7th Chess Olympiad (women) in Haifa (+5, =2, -2),
- In 1980, at second board in the 9th Chess Olympiad (women) in Valletta (+4, =3, -4),
- In 1982, at first reserve board in the 10th Chess Olympiad (women) in Lucerne (+4, =2, -3),
- In 1984, at first reserve board in the 26th Chess Olympiad (women) in Thessaloniki (+8, =2, -1) and won individual silver medal,
- In 1986, at first board in the 27th Chess Olympiad (women) in Dubai (+1, =1, -5).

Crotto participated twice in the Women's World Chess Championship Interzonal Tournaments:

- In 1979, at Interzonal Tournament in Rio de Janeiro shared 12th-13th place;
- In 1982, at Interzonal Tournament in Bad Kissingen shared 15th-16th place.

After 1986, she rarely participated in chess tournaments.

Crotto died on June 4, 2025, at the age of 66.
