= Ruifeng Li =

American chess grandmaster (born 2001)

Personal information
- Born: September 14, 2001 (age 25) Hangzhou, China

Chess career
- Country: United States
- Title: Grandmaster (2017)
- FIDE rating: 2535 (October 2026)
- Peak rating: 2587 (May 2018)

Ruifeng Li (born 2001) is an American chess grandmaster. He was awarded the title in 2017. As of January 2021, he is ranked 32nd best player in the US.

== Chess career ==
Li won the:

- Arkansas State Championship in 2011 at the age of 8. Later the same year he was the silver medalist in the World Youth Chess Championships under-10 section.
- 2016 US national Open.
- North American Junior Open U20 in 2016.
- 12th annual Philadelphia Open in 2018.

He drew against world class players such as Fabiano Caruana, Gata Kamsky, Luke McShane, and Alexey Dreev.

== Personal life ==
He graduated from the University of Texas at Austin with a degree in finance. His younger sister is Rachael Li, also a chess player.
