= U.S. Women's Chess Championship =

List of tournament results

Following are the results of the U.S. Women's Chess Championship from 1937 to date. The tournament determines the woman chess champion of the United States. The most recent title winner was Rachael Li. The tournament is held at the Saint Louis Chess Club at the same time as the US Chess Championship, having been held there since 2009.

== List of U.S. Women's Chess Champions ==
- 1937 Adele Rivero
- 1938 Mona May Karff
- 1940 Adele Rivero (2)
- 1941 Mona May Karff (2)
- 1942 Mona May Karff (3)
- 1944 Gisela Kahn Gresser
- 1946 Mona May Karff (4)
- 1948 Gisela Kahn Gresser (2) – Mona May Karff (5)
- 1951 Mary Bain
- 1953 Mona May Karff (6)
- 1955 Gisela Kahn Gresser (3) – Nancy Roos
- 1957 Gisela Kahn Gresser (4) – Sonja Graf
- 1959 Lisa Lane
- 1962 Gisela Kahn Gresser (5)
- 1964 Sonja Graf (2)
- 1965 Gisela Kahn Gresser (6)
- 1966 Gisela Kahn Gresser (7) – Lisa Lane (2)
- 1967 Gisela Kahn Gresser (8)
- 1969 Gisela Kahn Gresser (9)
- 1972 Eva Aronson – Marilyn Braun (Note: Braine, Bob (August 1972). "The 1972 Women's Championship". Chess Life. p. 474. The USCF website erroneously lists Braun by her maiden name, Marilyn Koput.)
- 1974 Mona May Karff (7)
- 1975 Diane Savereide
- 1976 Diane Savereide (2)
- 1978 Diane Savereide (3) – Rachel Crotto
- 1979 Rachel Crotto (2)
- 1981 Diane Savereide (4)
- 1984 Diane Savereide (5)
- 1986 Inna Izrailov
- 1987 Anna Akhsharumova
- 1989 Alexey Root
- 1990 Elena Donaldson
- 1991 Esther Epstein – Irina Levitina
- 1992 Irina Levitina (2)
- 1993 Elena Donaldson (2) – Irina Levitina (3)
- 1994 Elena Donaldson (3)
- 1995 Anjelina Belakovskaia – Sharon Burtman
- 1996 Anjelina Belakovskaia (2)
- 1997 Esther Epstein (2)
- 1998 Irina Krush
- 1999 Anjelina Belakovskaia (3)
- 2000 Elina Groberman – Camilla Baginskaite
- 2001/02 Jennifer Shahade
- 2003 Anna Hahn
- 2004 Jennifer Shahade (2)
- 2005 Rusudan Goletiani
- 2006 Anna Zatonskih
- 2007 Irina Krush (2)
- 2008 Anna Zatonskih (2)
- 2009 Anna Zatonskih (3)
- 2010 Irina Krush (3)
- 2011 Anna Zatonskih (4)
- 2012 Irina Krush (4)
- 2013 Irina Krush (5)
- 2014 Irina Krush (6)
- 2015 Irina Krush (7)
- 2016 Nazí Paikidze
- 2017 Sabina-Francesca Foisor
- 2018 Nazí Paikidze (2)
- 2019 Jennifer Yu
- 2020 Irina Krush (8)
- 2021 Carissa Yip
- 2022 Jennifer Yu (2)
- 2023 Carissa Yip (2)
- 2024 Carissa Yip (3)
- 2025 Carissa Yip (4)
- 2026 Rachael Li

== Crosstables ==
=== 1962 ===
The 1962 Women's Championship was a ten-round tournament held from April 21 to May 6 in New York City at the Marshall Chess Club and the Manhattan Chess Club, with the exception of round 8, which was played at the London Terrace chess club. Edward Lasker served as the tournament director. Player invitations were made on the basis of USCF ratings, and the field of eleven included defending champion Lisa Lane, former champions Gisela Kahn Gresser, Mary Bain, and Mona May Karff, and Amateur Champion Greta Fuchs, all from New York City.

Gresser won the title for the fifth time, the second time she won the title unshared. The title was not decided until the final round, when Gresser defeated defending champion Lane playing the White side of a Sicilian Defense. The championship was also the Women's Zonal tournament, so Gresser and Lane qualified to play in the 1963 Women's Candidates Tournament.

1962 U.S. Women's Championship, New York City April 22 – May 6
		Hometown	1	2	3	4	5	6	7	8	9	10	11	Total
1	Gisela Kahn Gresser	New York City	-	1	½	½	1	½	1	1	1	1	1	8½
2	Lisa Lane	New York City	0	-	1	½	0	1	1	1	1	1	1	7½
3	Eva Aronson	Chicago	½	0	-	½	1	½	1	½	1	1	1	7
4	Mona May Karff	New York City	½	½	½	-	½	1	1	½	1	½	1	7
5	Mary Bain	New York City	0	1	0	½	-	½	1	½	½	1	1	6
6	Lucille Kellner	Detroit	½	0	½	0	½	-	0	½	1	1	1	5
7	Jacqueline Piatigorsky	Los Angeles	0	0	0	0	0	1	-	1	1	0	1	4
8	Mary Selensky	Philadelphia	0	0	½	½	½	½	0	-	0	½	1	3½
9	Kate Sillars	Wilmette, Illinois	0	0	0	0	½	0	0	1	-	1	1	3½
10	Mildred Morrell	Avella, Pennsylvania	0	0	0	½	0	0	1	½	0	-	0	2
11	Greta Fuchs	New York City	0	0	0	0	0	0	0	0	0	1	-	1

=== 2009 ===
USA-ch (Women) Saint Louis 2009
	Player	Rating	1	2	3	4	5	6	7	8	9	0	Points	TB	Perf.	+/-
1	Anna Zatonskih (USA)	2462	*	½	1	1	1	1	1	1	1	1	8½		2765	+20
2	Camilla Baginskaite (USA)	2317	½	*	0	½	1	½	1	1	1	1	6½		2455	+18
3	Irina Krush (USA)	2458	0	1	*	½	0	1	1	½	½	1	5½	21.50	2353	+10
4	Alisa Melekhina (USA)	2220	0	½	½	*	1	½	1	0	1	1	5½	20.25	2378	+20
5	Tatev Abrahamyan (USA)	2275	0	0	1	0	*	½	½	1	0	1	4		2256	-2
6	Rusudan Goletiani (USA)	2391	0	½	0	½	½	*	0	1	0	1	3½	13.50	2203	-22
7	Sabina-Francesca Foisor (USA)	2320	0	0	0	0	½	1	*	1	1	0	3½	11.00	2211	-13
8	Iryna Zenyuk (USA)	2285	0	0	½	1	0	0	0	*	1	½	3		2173	-13
9	Yun Fan (USA)	1935	0	0	½	0	1	1	0	0	*	0	2½	10.25	2165	+16
10	Tsagaan Battsetseg (USA)	2258	0	0	0	0	0	0	1	½	1	*	2½	7.50	2130	-15

Average Elo: 2292 <=> Cat: 2

=== 2010 ===
USA-ch (Women) Saint Louis 2010
	Player	Rating	1	2	3	4	5	6	7	8	9	0	Points	TB	Perf.	+/-
1	Irina Krush (USA)	2476	*	½	1	1	1	½	1	1	1	1	8		2650	+14
2	Anna Zatonskih (USA)	2470	½	*	½	1	1	1	1	½	1	1	7½	28.25	2569	+10
3	Tatev Abrahamyan (USA)	2310	0	½	*	1	1	1	1	1	1	1	7½	25.75	2587	+30
4	Katerina Rohonyan (USA)	2319	0	0	0	*	½	0	1	1	1	1	4½	11.25	2307	-2
5	Alisa Melekhina (USA)	2265	0	0	0	½	*	1	0	1	1	1	4½	11.25	2312	+6
6	Camilla Baginskaite (USA)	2343	½	0	0	1	0	*	0	½	1	1	4	12.00	2266	-10
7	Iryna Zenyuk (USA)	2236	0	0	0	0	1	1	*	1	0	1	4	12.00	2277	+4
8	Sabina-Francesca Foisor (USA)	2317	0	½	0	0	0	½	0	*	1	1	3		2187	-16
9	Beatriz Marinello (USA)	2160	0	0	0	0	0	0	1	0	*	½	1½		2045	-11
10	Abby Marshall (USA)	2182	0	0	0	0	0	0	0	0	½	*	½		1830	-24

Average Elo: 2307 <=> Cat: 3

=== 2026 ===
USA-ch (Women) Saint Louis 2026
	Player	Rating	1	2	3	4	5	6	7	8	9	10	11	12	Points	TB	Perf.	+/-
1	Rachael Li (USA)	2380	*	1	1	0	1	1	½	½	½	1	1	1	8½		2559	+50
2	Alice Lee (USA)	2467	0	*	0	1	1	1	½	1	½	1	1	1	8		2515	+6.5
3	Irina Krush (USA)	2404	0	1	*	½	½	0	½	1	1	1	1	1	7½		2479	+11.4
4	Thalia Cervantes (USA)	2267	1	0	½	*	½	0	½	1	1	½	0	1	6	31.75	2396	+43.2
5	Megan Paragua (USA)	2234	0	0	½	½	*	½	1	½	1	0	1	1	6	27.50	2397	+46.6
6	Jennifer Yu (USA)	2354	0	0	1	1	½	*	½	½	½	½	0	½	5		2314	-11
7	Anna Zatonskih (USA)	2319	½	½	½	½	0	½	*	0	0	1	½	½	4½	25.50	2289	-4.8
8	Tatev Abrahamyan (USA)	2353	½	0	0	0	½	½	1	*	1	1	0	0	4½	23.25	2285	-10.3
9	Carissa Yip (USA)	2484	½	½	0	0	0	½	1	0	*	0	1	1	4½	22.25	2274	-31
10	Rose Atwell (USA)	2325	0	0	0	½	1	½	0	0	1	*	½	1	4½	21	2288	-5.8
11	Anna M. Sargsyan (USA)	2332	0	0	0	1	0	1	½	1	0	½	*	0	4		2250	-12
12	Nazí Paikidze (USA)	2309	0	0	0	0	0	½	½	1	0	0	1	*	3		2179	-18.4

Average Elo: 2352 <=> Cat: 5

== See also ==
- U.S. Women's Open Chess Championship
- Women's World Chess Championship
- U.S. Chess Championship
