= Rusudan Goletiani =

Georgian-American chess player (born 1980)

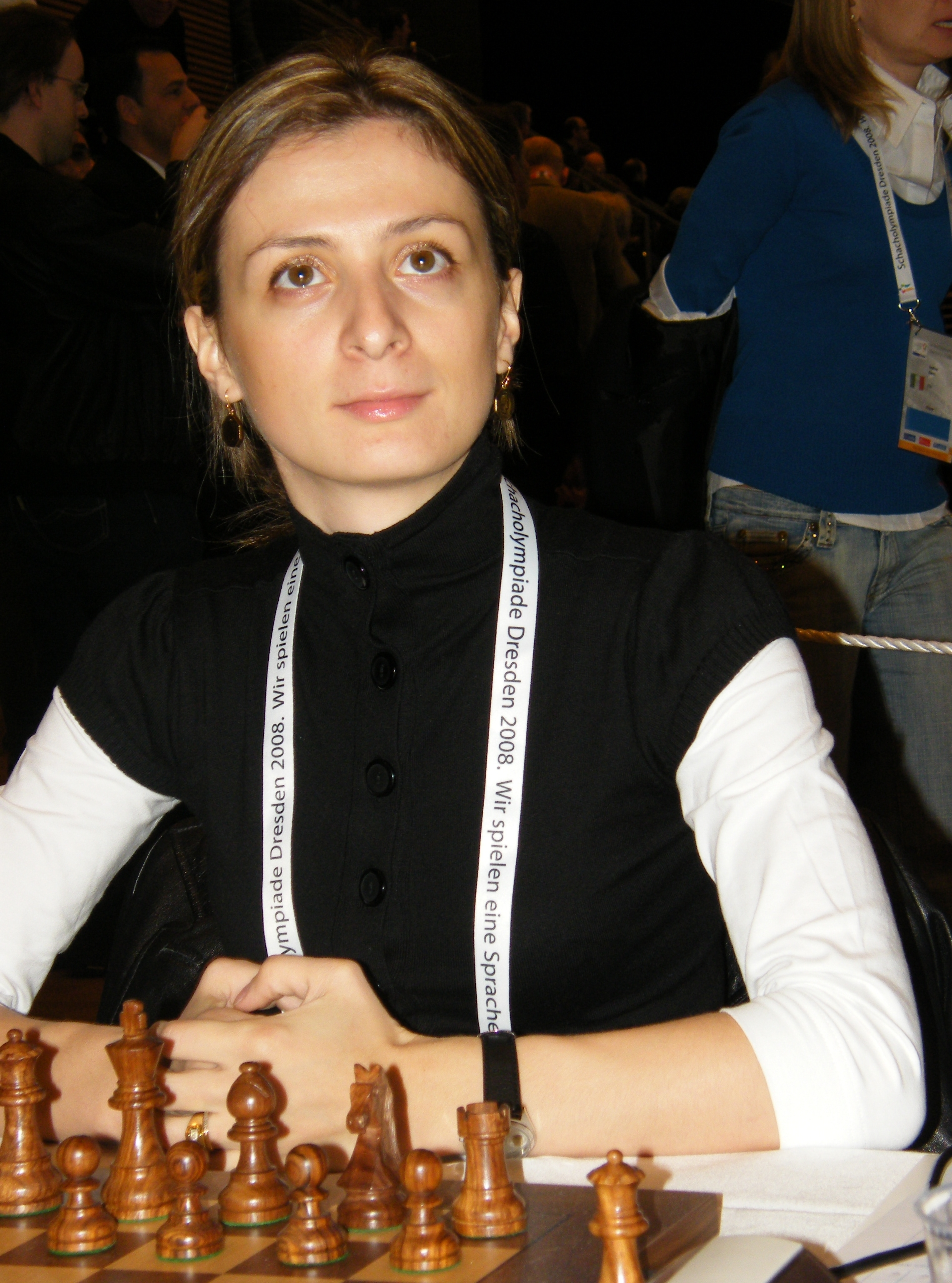
- Goletiani at the Dresden Olympiad, 2008

Personal information
- Born: September 8, 1980 (age 45) Sukhumi, Abkhazian ASSR, Georgian SSR, Soviet Union

Chess career
- Country: Soviet Union (until 1991); Georgia (1991–2000); United States (since 2000)
- Title: International Master (2009); Woman Grandmaster (1999)
- Peak rating: 2403 (October 2006)

Rusudan Goletiani (Georgian: რუსუდან გოლეთიანი; born September 8, 1980) is a Georgian-American chess player with the FIDE titles of International Master and Woman Grandmaster. She was three-time world girls' champion in her age category, the 2003 American continental women's champion and the 2005 U.S. women's championship.

== Chess career ==
Goletiani won the Soviet junior championship for girls under 12 in 1990, when she was nine years old. In 1990, she was the Soviet representative in the World Youth Chess tournament for Peace in Fond du Lac, Wisconsin, US. In 1994, she won the world championship for girls under 14 in Hungary. In 1995, she won the world championship for girls under 16 in Guarapuava, Brazil. In 1997, she won the world championship for girls under 18 in Yerevan, Armenia.

Goletiani qualified to the Women's World Chess Championship, scheduled to begin on November 25, 2000 in New Delhi, India, by tying for first with Grandmaster Nino Khurtsidze in a zonal tournament in Georgia in May 2000. However, there were lengthy times when she was not able to compete in chess events because of the Georgian civil war at the beginning of the 1990s and the 1992-1993 war in Abkhazia, where she was born.

Goletiani moved to the United States in May 2000. In 2003, she won the American Continental Women's Championship. Goletiani won the 2005 US Women's Championship after defeating Tatev Abrahamyan by 2–0 in a playoff. At the 2008 Women's Chess Olympiad, held in Dresden, she won the bronze medal with the US team and the individual silver on board three.

Goletiani scored 6/11 in the US Women's Championship in May 2015. She plays in tournaments infrequently, her last event a 3½/11 score in the US Women's Championship in April 2018.
