= Sabina-Francesca Foisor =

Romanian-American chess player (born 1989)

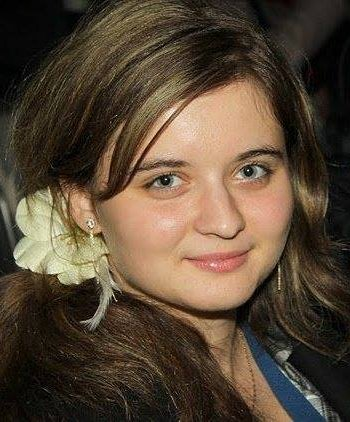
- Sabina-Francesca Foisor at the 39th Chess Olympiad in Khanty-Mansiysk in 2010.

Personal information
- Born: August 30, 1989 (age 36) Timișoara, Romania

Chess career
- Country: Romania (until 2008); United States (since 2008)
- Title: Woman Grandmaster (2007)
- Peak rating: 2386 (January 2008)

Sabina-Francesca Foişor (born August 30, 1989) is a Romanian American chess player holding the title of Woman Grandmaster (WGM). She competed in the Women's World Chess Championship in 2008 and 2017. Foisor won the US women's championship in 2017.

== Chess career ==
Foisor won four medals at the European Youth Chess Championships in various age categories: one gold (girls U8 in 1996), one silver (girls U16 in 2004) and two bronze (girls U14 in 2003 and girls U18 in 2007). She represented Romania in the European Girls U18 Team Chess Championship in 2004 and 2007, winning three medals: two gold (2004 individual medal, 2007 team medal) and one bronze (2007 individual medal).

Foisor was awarded the titles Woman International Master (WIM) in 2005 and Woman Grandmaster (WGM) in 2007. She achieved the norms required for the WGM title at the Acropolis women's tournament in Athens in 2006 and European Individual Women's Chess Championship in Dresden in 2007.

Her result at 2007 European Women's Championship qualified her for the Women's World Chess Championship 2008 in Nalchik, Russia. The final armageddon tiebreak game of her first round match against Monika Soćko ended in controversy. Foisor only needed a draw to advance to the next round, and reached a drawn ending with each player having only a king and a knight. Although Foisor ran out of time, the arbiter initially ruled that the game was a draw. Soćko appealed, pointing out that what matters is not whether checkmate can be forced, but rather if it is possible. Soćko won the appeal and advanced to the next round, eliminating Foisor from the event.

In 2007, Foisor tied for first place with her mother, Cristina Adela Foisor, the Villard-de-Lans Open in France. In 2008, she tied for first in the Liege Master tournament in Boncelles, Belgium.

In 2008, Foisor transferred chess federations to represent the United States. Since 2010, she has represented the US in the Women's Chess Olympiad (2010, 2012, 2014, 2016, 2018) and the Women's World Team Chess Championship (2013, 2015, 2017, 2019). In 2017, Foisor won the U.S. Women's Chess Championship in St. Louis, Missouri.

== Personal life ==
Both her parents, International Masters Cristina Adela Foișor and Ovidiu-Doru Foișor, were multiple Romanian chess championship medalists. Her younger sister, Mihaela-Veronica, is a chess player with the title of Woman International Master. Sabina-Francesca Foisor moved to the United States in 2008 to study at the University of Maryland, Baltimore County. She was engaged to GM Elshan Moradi.

Achievements
Preceded by Nazí Paikidze	U.S. Women's Chess Champion; 2017	Succeeded by Nazí Paikidze
