= Rachael Li =

American chess player (born 2010)

Personal information
- Born: January 6, 2010 (age 16) Plano, Texas, U.S.

Chess career
- Country: United States
- Title: Woman International Master (2025)
- Peak rating: 2430 (November 2026)

Rachael Li (born January 6, 2010) is an American chess player who holds the title of Woman International Master (WIM).

== Career ==
She is the reigning US Women's Champion, and the 2nd-youngest US Women's Champion in history. Li holds the record for the youngest girl to become a USCF National Master (NM), which she achieved in 2019 at 9 years and 10 months old. She became a USCF Expert at the age of 8 years and 9 months, also a girls' record.

== Personal life ==
Li has an older brother, Ruifeng Li, who is a Grandmaster (GM).
