= Adele Rivero =

American chess player (1908–1992)

- Born: Adolphine Octaire Permereur; March 10, 1908; Antwerp, Belgium
- Died: May 5, 1992 (aged 84); Williston, Vermont, United States
- Other names: Adele Belcher
- Citizenship: United States
- Occupation: Chess player

Adele Rivero (March 10, 1908 – May 5, 1992) was an American chess player. She won the first U.S Women's Chess Champion and held the title twice, in 1937 and 1940.

Born Adolphine Octaire Permereur in Antwerp, Belgium to Edward Permereur and Marguerite Braun Permereur, she initially came to the United States in 1916. She was married in New York in 1931 (and then divorced) to a Spanish man named Dorotes D. Rivero. She initially learned chess because her husband told her that "women didn't have the brains for the game".

In 1941, she lost her title to Mona May Karff. The day just before, Adele remarried, to Donald Belcher. She was Vermont champion in 1954.
