= Anderson W. Clark Magnet High School =

Coordinates: 34.237183°N 118.253991°W

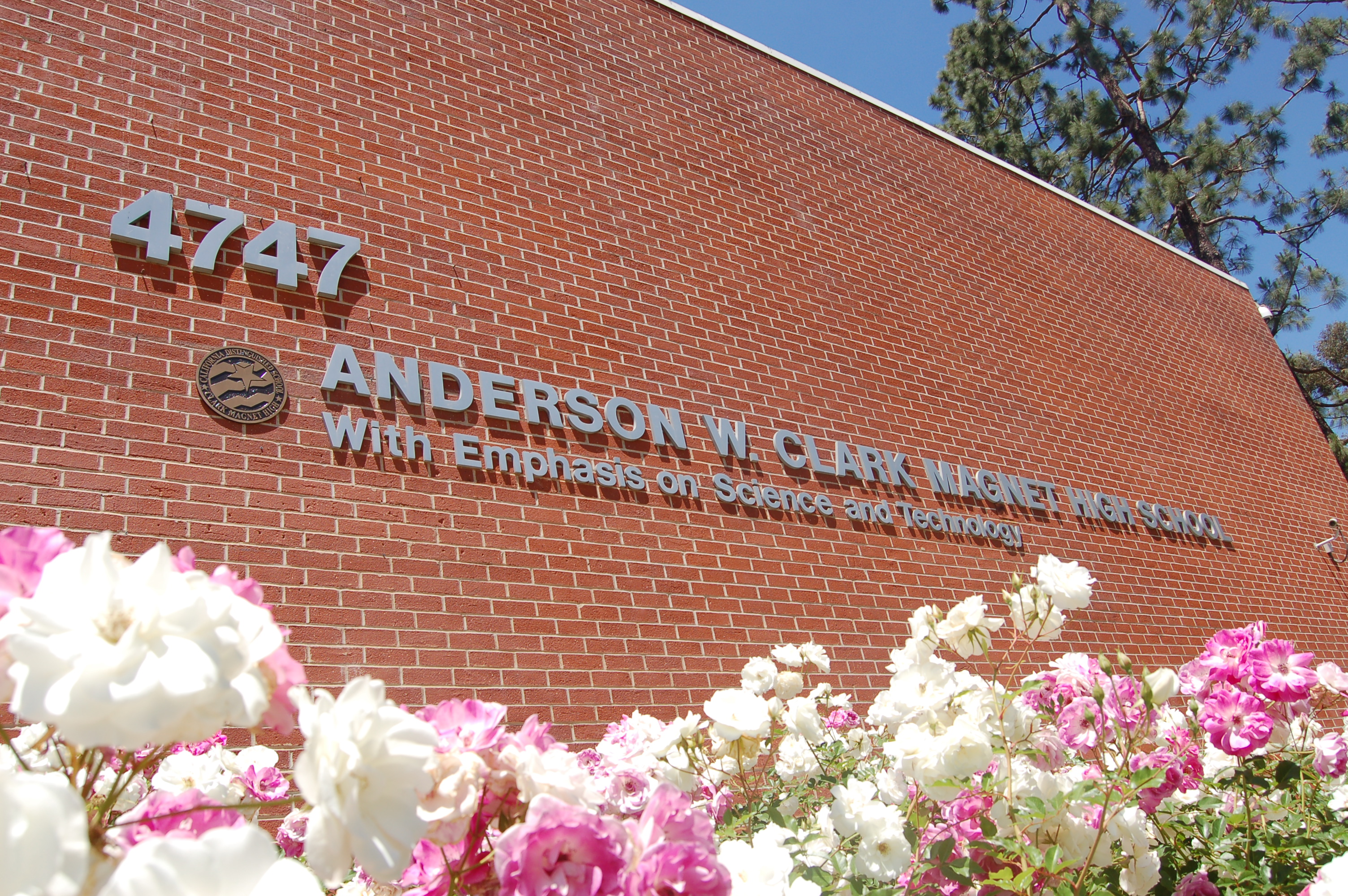

Location
- 4747 New York Ave; La Crescenta, California; United States

Information
- Type: Public magnet secondary
- Established: September 1998
- School district: Glendale Unified School District
- Principal: Mark Rubio
- Teaching staff: 43.25 (FTE)
- Grades: 9–12
- Enrollment: 1,139 (2023-24)
- Student to teacher ratio: 25.69
- Campus: Suburban
- Colors: Green and White
- Mascot: Panther
- Accreditation: WASC
- Website: clarkhs.gusd.net

Anderson W. Clark Magnet High School is a high school located in Glendale, California, United States. The school is managed as a part of the Glendale Unified School District.

== History ==
The school was conceived from the recommendations of the "Vision of the Future" Task Force, created by the Glendale Unified School District to investigate overcrowding at the school district's three comprehensive high schools, Glendale High School, Herbert Hoover and Crescenta Valley. The task force recommended a new magnet school be commissioned, to focus on advanced technologies and the physical and earth sciences. To alleviate overcrowding, Clark Magnet High School accepts students from the attendance of all three comprehensive high schools through a lottery system.

The school uses the former campus of Anderson W. Clark Junior High School. It underwent a US$15,000,000 renovation and opened in September, 1998. The school is bolstered by corporate sponsorships. Doug Dall was the inaugural principal for Clark Magnet. He served the school until his retirement in 2016. Lena Kortoshian has been principal since 2016 until 2022, where she got promoted to a district level job. Following Kortoshian's leave, Assistant Principal Dr. Brian Landisi, became Clark's new principal as of October 2022. Today, the current principal is Mark Rubio.

About 300 students are enrolled each year. The Class of 2013 accepted 325 students out of 607 applicants, or about 54%.

== Academics ==
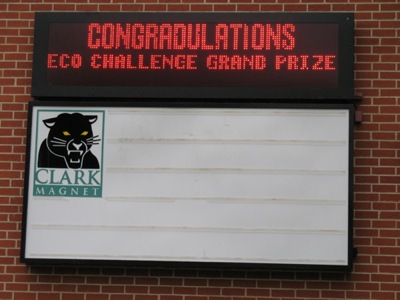
Lexus Eco Challenge winners

In 2005, it was designated as a California Distinguished School, an honor bestowed by the California Department of Education to the best schools in the public system, and received the California Exemplary Career Technical Education Program Award. In 2005, it had the top Academic Performance Index (API) ranking of any high school in the Glendale Unified School District. In 2006 it became a National Blue Ribbon School. In addition, five students of the school won the 2010-2011 Lexus Eco Challenge Grand Prize for their analysis of toxins present in lobsters.

In 2015, it was ranked nationally as the 153rd best school in the country by Newsweek.

== 2021 rankings ==
Clark Magnet High School is ranked averagely high in many different categories. Clark Magnet has an overall score of 96.54/100. The school's rankings as of 2021 are as follows:

- #510 National Ranking
- #70 California High Schools
- #29 Los Angeles, Metro Area High Schools
- #105 Magnet High Schools

== Application process ==
In order to attend Clark Magnet High School, students must fill out an application. These are the requirements for Clark Magnet High School as of 2019:

- Grade point average of at least a 2.0 (C's).
- Living in the GUSD area.
- Eligible for Integrated Math I.
- No more than five unsatisfactory (U's) citizenship marks.
- No more than 10 missed days of school the year before.

The eligible applications will then go through an electronic lottery. Students who apply after the deadline are put on a waiting list. After an applicant has been chosen in the lottery, they have to accept or decline their seat at Clark Magnet High School.

== Sports ==
Clark Magnet has intramural sports. These intramural sports allow students to participate in athletic activities such as basketball, flag football, softball, and volleyball. Students form teams with other fellow students and compete for trophies and medals. The school also hosts other informal athletic activities, such as a mountain biking club.

== Demographics ==
Statistics for 2008-2009 school year

As of 2006 about 60% of the students were ethnic Armenian.

=== Students by grade ===
- Grade 9 - 330
- Grade 10 - 296
- Grade 11 - 261
- Grade 12 - 243

=== Gender and ethnicity ===
==== Gender ====
- Male -
- Female - 519

==== Ethnicity ====
- American Indian/Alaskan Native - 1 (0.1%)
- Asian - 102 (9.5%)
- Hispanic/Latino - 58 (5.4%)
- Caucasian/White - 841 (83.5%)
- Multiple or no response - 4 (0.4%)
- Black/African American - 1 (0.1%)

== Robotics ==
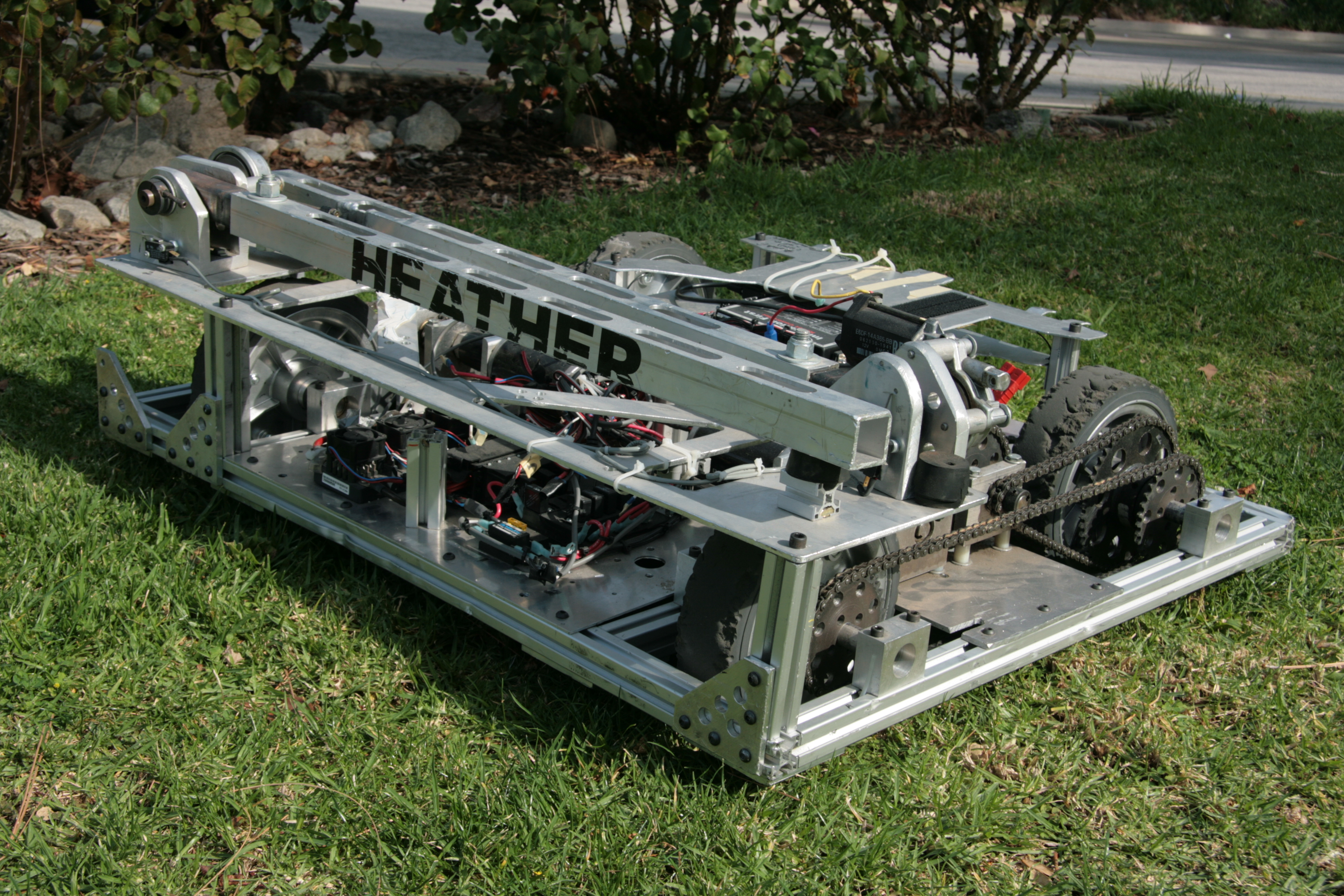
Robot created by students in 2003 for the FIRST Robotics Competition

FIRST Robotics Competition Team 696 (The Circuit Breakers) is based at Clark. Each year since 2001, members have created functional robots in the six-week time period allotted. With the help of several mentors, the team of high school students has competed at FIRST Robotics regional competitions in Los Angeles, California, San Diego, California, and Phoenix, Arizona. In the 2007 season, after taking finalist in the Los Angeles Regional and winning the San Diego Regional, the team attended the FIRST Championship in Atlanta, Georgia for the first time in the team's history. The team would again attend the FIRST Championship in 2022 and 2023, after winning the Los Angeles and Port Hueneme regionals respectively.

VEX Robotics A VEX Robotics team was established during the 2014–2015 school year. The team, instead of using custom built and machined parts, used VEX's prefabricated products and systems to create competition-ready, functional, and operational robots. The team attended its own competitions and competed with other schools, similar to the FIRST team. Clark's VEX Robotics team did not restart after the lockdown.

=== Mentors ===
The FIRST team is supported by mentors who guide the students in the creation of each year's robot. The Jet Propulsion Laboratory, located in Pasadena, California, has long been a source of mentors for the team. Other mentors come from local community organizations and businesses and provide the team with machining resources and sponsorship. Parents also mentor the team, and provide guidance through their knowledge of construction, machining, design, and strategy. During the 2010 season, mentor Hannah Goldberg was awarded the Woodie Flowers Award at the San Diego Regional. In the 2015 season, David Black, a Team 696 alumnus from 2002 who became the head mentor of the team in 2011 also received the Woodie Flowers Award during the Ventura Regional, presented by Woodie Flowers himself. The Woodie Flowers Award is presented to one outstanding mentor at each FRC competition. As of 2022, David Black is no longer a team mentor.

=== 2021 - 2022 Season ===
The FIRST team, under leadership by Hunter Pruett and Jeffrey Lewis, performed exceptionally during the 2021 - 2022 season, Rapid React. The robot, named "Sanddrag" after the former director's Chief Delphi account (David Black), featured a two-ball serializer, adjustable-pitch hood, variable speed shooter, and a world-record-achieving rotary climber, which could traverse three height-increasing monkey bars in under 2.5 seconds. Sanddrag performed poorly during the team's first competition of the season in Ventura County, but went on to go undefeated in the team's second competition in El Segundo, the 2022 Los Angeles Regional, with a 17-0-0 W-L-T record and beating out FRC Team 3476 code orange. The team was featured in a JPL article after winning the competition, and earned a spot at the 2022 FRC World Championships in Houston, Texas, in which they went on to rank third in their division by performance and were eventually defeated by Mad Town Robotics. Overall, the team was, at one point, ranked 15th in the world after their performance at the Los Angeles Regional competition.

== Notable alumni ==
- Tatev Abrahamyan, Armenian-American chess player
