= Nazí Paikidze =

Georgian-American chess player (born 1993)

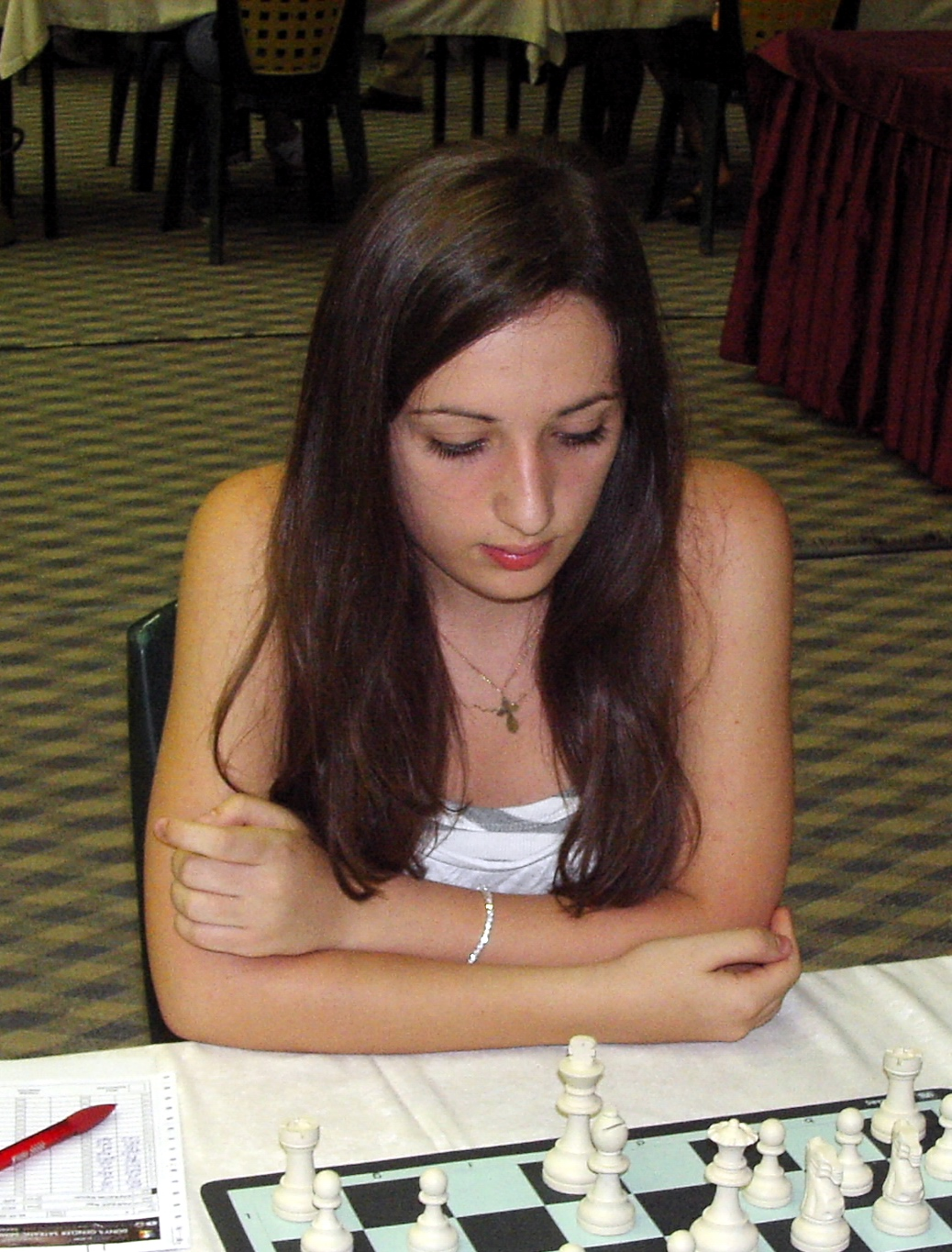
- Paikidze at the World Junior Chess Championship in Gaziantep, 2008

Personal information
- Born: 27 October 1993 (age 33) Irkutsk, Russia
- Spouse: Greg Barnes

Chess career
- Country: Georgia (until 2013); United States (since 2013)
- Title: International Master (2012); Woman Grandmaster (2010)
- Peak rating: 2455 (January 2011)

Nazí Nodarovna Paikidze, also Paikidze-Barnes (Georgian: ნაზი პაიკიძე, Nazí Ṗaiḳiʒe, pronounced [nazi pʼaiˈkʼidze]; Russian: Нази Нодаровна Паикидзе-Барнс, pronounced [nɐˈzʲi pəiˈkʲidzə], born 27 October 1993), is a Georgian–American chess player. She holds the titles of International Master (IM) and Woman Grandmaster (WGM), which FIDE awarded her in 2012 and 2010 respectively. Paikidze was twice world girls' champion and four-time European girls' champion in her age category, and is a twice U.S. women's champion.

== Early life ==
Paikidze was born in Irkutsk, Russia. Her father was a mechanical engineer, and her mother a biochemist. Her father taught her to play chess when she was four years old. That same year, her parents moved to Tbilisi, Georgia, where she grew up with dual citizenship – Georgian and Russian.

In Tbilisi, Paikidze attended elementary school, where chess was part of the curriculum, and she relates that chess became her favorite class. Her chess teacher recognized her talent and suggested to her parents that they might consider chess as a profession for their daughter. Paikidze has said: "Every family in Georgia owns a chess set and knows how to play. Everyone in the country knows the names and faces of the top Georgian chess players."

In 1999, at the age of 6, Paikidze began working with her first professional chess coach and improved quickly. Just over three years later, in 2003, at the age of 9, Paikidze won her first international tournament: the European Youth Chess Championship, in a category for girls under ten years old. After that tournament she earned the title of FIDE Master. Her family then moved to Moscow in 2006.

Paikidze's brother was a football player.

In 2008, at the age of 14, Paikidze began being coached by Russian grandmaster Vladimir Belov and others. She became a Woman Grandmaster in 2010, then an International Master.

== Chess career ==
Paikidze won twelve medals at European Youth Chess Championship, World Youth Chess Championship, and World Junior Chess Championship, including six gold medals, in various age categories. She won the European Youth Chess Championship four times: in Budva 2003 (Under-10 girls' category), Herceg Novi 2005 (U-12 girls), Šibenik 2007 (U-14 girls), and Herceg Novi 2008 (U-16 girls). She won medals in the World Youth Chess Championship in Kallithea 2003 (bronze U-10 girls), Belfort 2005 (silver U-12 girls), Batumi 2006 (bronze U-14 girls), Kemer 2007 (gold U-14 girls), Vũng Tàu 2008 (gold U-16 girls), and Antalya 2009 (bronze U-16 girls). She also won two bronze medals at the U-20 World Junior Girls Chess Championship, in Gaziantep 2008 and Madras 2011.

2009. At the age of 16, Paikidze attained a peak rating of 2455 and was rated 35th in world of the top FIDE-rated women.

2010. Paikidze jointly won the women's open event of the Moscow Open, won the Moscow Women's Championship and the Russian Women's Championship qualifier ("Higher League"), and finished fourth in the Russian Women's Championship Superfinal. In the same year, she was awarded the title of Woman Grandmaster (WGM), for her results in the 2008 Aeroflot Open, 2009 Georgian Women's Championship, where she came equal second, and the 2010 Moscow Open.

2011. Paikidze represented Georgia in the 9th European Women's Team Chess Championship in Porto Carras 2011, winning the team bronze medal. In 2012, Paikidze was awarded the title of International Master (IM).

2013. Paikidze competed in a small number of international chess events in the United States after moving to Baltimore, Maryland. She then changed her FIDE federation to that of the U.S.

2015. Paikidze made her debut in the U.S. Women's Chess Championship, finishing second with a score of 7½/11 points. Later that year, she won the Boardwalk Open in Galloway, New Jersey, edging out on tiebreak Sergey Kudrin and Igor Sorkin, after all finished on 4/5.

2016. On April 25, Paikidze won the U.S. Women's Championship in her second appearance with 8½ points in 11 games.

Paikidze boycotted the Women's World Chess Championship 2017 in Tehran, Iran due to its hijab dress code: "I will not wear a hijab and support women's oppression. Even if it means missing one of the most important competitions of my career." She received support for her stance from the U.S. Chess Federation, as well as prominent players Nigel Short and Garry Kasparov. Her online petition asking for the championship to be moved or the hijab laws to be relaxed has received over 15,000 signatures. It has been pointed out in this context that the U.S. Department of State has issued a warning that there is a "risk of arrest and detention of U.S. citizens", and also states that travelers "should very carefully weigh the risks of travel and consider postponing their travel".

2018. In April, Paikidze won the 2018 U.S. Women's Championship for the second time, after defeating WIM Annie Wang in the playoff match, which started with 1–1 in the rapid, and finished with Paikidze winning as white in the Armageddon.

2021. In October, Paikidze tied for 8th at the 2021 U.S. Women's Championship with a score of 4.5/11 points.

== Personal life ==
Paikidze currently is a full-time chess professional. She married American engineer Greg Barnes and resides in the area of Las Vegas, Nevada, U.S. Paikidze studied at the University of Maryland, Baltimore County (UMBC), which has a chess program that has won a record number of times both the Pan-American Intercollegiate Team Chess Championship and the President's Cup. She joined the UMBC team in the fall of 2012.

== Meanings of names ==
- Her Georgian first name Nazí (ნაზი) translates as "gentle". She has explained that the correct pronunciation is "nah-ZEE" (Georgian pronunciation: [nɑˈzi]). She was named after her grandmother.
- Her Russian patronym Nodarovna (Нодаровна) translates as "daughter of Nodar", with "Nodar" (Нодар) being her father's name and "-ovna" (-овна) translating to "daughter of".
- Her Georgian family name translates as "Pawn's son" or "son of a pawn", with paiki (პაიკი) translating as pawn, dze (ძე) translating as son.

Achievements
Preceded by Irina Krush	U.S. Women's Chess Champion; 2016	Succeeded by Sabina-Francesca Foisor
Preceded by Sabina-Francesca Foisor	U.S. Women's Chess Champion; 2018	Succeeded by Jennifer Yu
