= Anna Akhsharumova =

American chess player (born 1957)

Personal information
- Born: January 9, 1957 (age 69) Moscow, Soviet Union
- Spouse: Boris Gulko

Chess career
- Country: Soviet Union (before 1986); Israel (1986–1987); United States (after 1987)
- Title: Woman Grandmaster (1990)
- Peak rating: 2400 (July 1988)

Anna Akhsharumova (Russian: Анна Марковна Ахшарумова; born 9 January 1957, Moscow) is a Russian-American chess Woman Grandmaster.

== Chess career ==
She won the Women's Soviet Chess Championship in 1976 and 1984, and the 1987 U.S. Women's Chess Championship with a perfect score.

She played for the U.S. in the Women's Chess Olympiads in 1988, 1990, and 1996.

Her best Elo rating was 2400 in 1989.

== Personal life ==
She is married to chess grandmaster Boris Gulko. Akhsharumova and her husband became famous in the late-1970s as Soviet Refuseniks. They were finally allowed to leave the Soviet Union and emigrate to the United States in 1986. Shortly after, she cut down on her chess tournament appearances to focus on her IT job.
