= Anna Zatonskih =

Ukrainian-American chess player (born 1978)

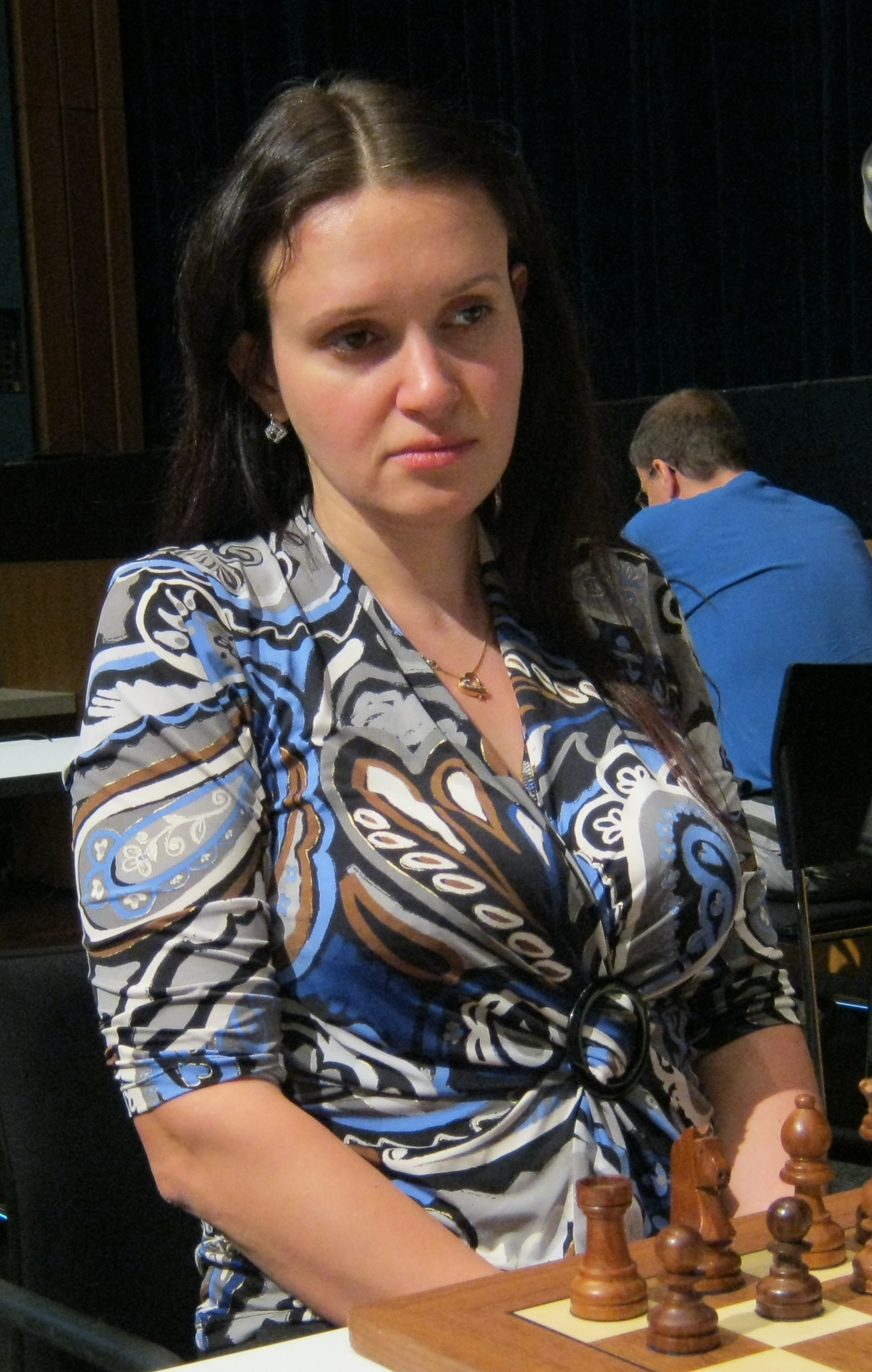
- Zatonskih in 2010

Personal information
- Born: Hanna Vitaliivna Zatonskih; July 17, 1978 (age 48) Mariupol, Ukrainian SSR, Soviet Union
- Spouse: Daniel Fridman

Chess career
- Country: Ukraine (until 2003); United States (since 2003)
- Title: International Master (2004); Woman Grandmaster (1999)
- Peak rating: 2537 (May 2011)

Anna Zatonskih (born Hanna Vitaliivna Zatonskih (Note: Ukrainian: Ганна Віталіївна Затонських, romanized: Hanna Vitaliivna Zatonskykh), July 17, 1978) is a Ukrainian and American chess player who holds the titles International Master (IM) and Woman Grandmaster (WGM). She is a four-time U.S. women's champion, as well as a former Ukrainian women's champion.

== Career ==
Born July 17, 1978, in Mariupol, Ukraine (then part of the Soviet Union), Zatonskih learned chess at age five from her parents, who are both strong players. Her father Vitaly is rated about 2300, while her mother is a candidate master. Anna beat her mother for the first time at age 14.

Zatonskih won many Ukrainian girls' titles in several age categories. In 1999 she was awarded the WGM title by FIDE. She won the Ukrainian Women's Championship in 2001. She represented Ukraine in two Women's Chess Olympiads, at Istanbul 2000 at Bled 2002, and in two Women's European Team Championships, Batumi 1999 (where she won a silver medal on her board) and Leon 2001.

She has played on the U.S. national team in all Women's Olympiads since 2004 and in four Women's World Team Championships. Her team won the team silver medal in the 2004 Olympiad and the team bronze in the 2008 Olympiad; she also won the gold medal on board one at the 2008 Olympiad, and the silver medal on board one at the 2017 Women's World Team Championship. In 2023, she played on Board 2 for Team USA in the FIDE Women's Team Championship, helping Team USA reach the semifinals.

Zatonskih won the United States Women's Chess Championship in 2006, 2008, 2009 and 2011. In 2008, she defeated the defending U.S. women's champion, Irina Krush, in a playoff held with the "Armageddon" format.

== Personal life ==
Zatonskih is married to Grandmaster Daniel Fridman, also a chess player. They have a daughter, Sofia, and a son, Joshua.

== Notes ==
Preceded by Rusudan Goletiani	U.S. Women's Chess Champion; 2006	Succeeded by Irina Krush
Preceded by Irina Krush	U.S. Women's Chess Champion; 2008, 2009	Succeeded by Irina Krush
Preceded by Irina Krush	U.S. Women's Chess Champion; 2011	Succeeded by Irina Krush
