= Mary Bain =

American chess player (1904–1972)

- Mary Bain in 1937
- Country: United States
- Born: August 8, 1904; Ungvár, Kárpátalja, Hungary
- Died: October 26, 1972 (aged 68); New York City, United States
- Title: Woman International Master (1952)

Mary Weiser Bain (August 8, 1904 – October 26, 1972) was an American chess master.

== Biography ==
She was born in or near Ungvár, Kárpátalja, Hungary, which is now Uzhhorod, Zakarpattia oblast, Ukraine, into an assimilated Jewish family. Under the name Marie Weiserova, her 1921 New York immigration manifest lists her previous address as "Ushorod, Czecho-Sl." or Uzhhorod, which was then in Czechoslovakia, but it also lists her place of birth as "Iadobover" [sic], and the modern name of this town is unclear.

She was a Women's World Chess Championship Challenger in 1937 and 1952 and the first American woman to represent the U.S. in an organized chess competition.

She married Leslie Balogh Bain in 1926, an author, war correspondent and film director, and had two children with him. They divorced in 1948. In the 1950s, she ran a chess emporium and coffee house on 42nd Street in Manhattan. She died in New York.

Mary Bain won the U.S. Women's Chess Championship in 1951. Bain was awarded the Woman International Master title in 1952 and represented her country at the 1963 Chess Olympiad, held in Split.

In international tournaments, she took fifth place at Stockholm 1937 (Vera Menchik won) and 14th place at Moscow 1952 (Elisabeth Bykova won).

== See also ==
- List of Jewish chess players
