= Irina Krush =

American chess grandmaster (born 1983)

- Krush at the 2026 Chess Olympiad

Personal information
- Born: Irina Borisivna Krush; December 24, 1983 (age 42) Odesa, Ukrainian SSR, Soviet Union
- Spouse: Pascal Charbonneau (m. 2007, divorced)

Chess career
- Country: United States
- Title: Grandmaster (2013)
- FIDE rating: 2415 (November 2026)
- Peak rating: 2502 (October 2013)

Irina Borisivna Krush (Ukrainian: Ірина Борисівна Круш; born December 24, 1983) is an American chess grandmaster. She is the only woman to earn the GM title while playing for the United States. (Note: Susan Polgar, affiliated to the U.S. federation 2002–2019, became a Grandmaster in 1991 while affiliated with the Hungarian federation.) Krush is an eight-time U.S. Women's Champion and a two-time Women's American Cup Champion.

== Early life ==
Irina Krush was born into a Jewish family in Odesa, USSR (now Ukraine), and emigrated with her parents to Brooklyn in 1989. Her father, a college chess player, taught Irina the game. When she was 6, she won her first tournament, and at the age of 7 she represented the U.S. at the World Youth Championships for girls under 10 in Poland.

== Chess career ==
At age 14, Krush won the 1998 U.S. Women's Chess Championship to become the youngest U.S. women's champion ever. She has won the championship on seven other occasions, in 2007, 2010, 2012, 2013, 2014, 2015, and 2020.

In 1999, Krush took part in the "Kasparov versus the World" chess competition. Garry Kasparov played the white pieces and the Internet public, via a Microsoft host website, voted on moves for the black pieces, guided by the recommendations of Krush and three of her contemporaries, Étienne Bacrot, Elisabeth Pähtz and Florin Felecan. On the tenth move, Krush suggested a novelty, for which the World team voted. Kasparov said later that he lost control of the game at that point, and wasn't sure whether he was winning or losing.

Krush played in the Group C of the 2008 Corus Chess Tournament, a 14-player round-robin tournament held in Wijk aan Zee, the Netherlands. She finished in joint fifth place having scored 7/13 points after five wins (including the one against the eventual winner, Fabiano Caruana), four draws and four losses.

In 2013, she was awarded the Grandmaster title due to her results at the NYC Mayor's Cup International GM Tournament in 2001, Women's World Team Chess Championship 2013 and Baku Open 2013.

In 2022, she won the 2022 American Cup (Women's field) in a double-elimination format. She tied with Jennifer Yu in the 2022 U.S. Women's Chess Championship but lost the playoff.

=== Team competitions ===
Krush has played on the U.S. national team in the Women's Chess Olympiad since 1998. The U.S. team won the silver medal in 2004 and bronze in 2008. In 2022, Krush was a member of the U.S. women's team at the 44th Chess Olympiad, where the team placed fourth. She also competed as part of the US team in the Women's World Team Chess Championship in 2009 and 2013.

She played for the team Manhattan Applesauce in the U.S. Chess League in 2015; she previously played for the New York Knights (2005–2011, 2013). Krush and her ex-husband, Canadian Grandmaster Pascal Charbonneau, have played in the United Kingdom league for Guildford-ADC.

In May 2020, Krush played for the USA team in the FIDE Online Nations Cup.

=== Writing ===
Krush frequently contributes articles to Chess Life magazine and uschess.org. Her article on earning her grandmaster title in 2013 was honored as the "Best of US Chess" that year.

== Personal life ==
Krush attended Edward R. Murrow High School in Brooklyn. She graduated in International Relations from New York University in 2006.

Krush identifies as a "Christian Jew", embracing both her Jewish heritage and Christian faith since her conversion in 2011.

In March 2016, Krush appeared on the talk show Steve Harvey along with two actresses impersonating Krush. The trio answered questions from host Steve Harvey and guest Hillary Clinton regarding her life and chess career. Harvey successfully identified the real Irina Krush.

In March 2020, she was hospitalized and treated for a "moderate" COVID-19 infection, then released to recover under quarantine at home. While quarantined, she played in the Isolated Queens Swiss, an online women's blitz chess tournament. She scored 7.5/10 in the tournament, putting her in joint second place, a half point behind tournament winner GM Alexandra Kosteniuk.

On January 18, 2023, Krush (and her former chess opponent Carissa Yip) appeared on a primetime special of The Price Is Right. Krush won the Clock Game, but she failed to advance to the Showcases.

== Notes ==
Achievements
Preceded by Esther Epstein	U.S. Women's Chess Champion; 1998	Succeeded by Anjelina Belakovskaia
Preceded by Anna Zatonskih	U.S. Women's Chess Champion; 2007	Succeeded by Anna Zatonskih
Preceded by Anna Zatonskih	U.S. Women's Chess Champion; 2010	Succeeded by Anna Zatonskih
Preceded by Anna Zatonskih	U.S. Women's Chess Champion; 2012, 2013, 2014, 2015	Succeeded by Nazí Paikidze
Preceded by Jennifer Yu	U.S. Women's Chess Champion; 2020	Succeeded by Carissa Yip
