= Varvara =

Varvara (Cyrillic: Варвара; Greek: Βαρβάρα, romanized: Varvára), a variant of "Barbara", may refer to:

== Places ==
- Varvara, Azerbaijan
- Varvara, Prozor, on the Rama river, Bosnia and Herzegovina
- Varvara, Burgas Province, Bulgaria
- Varvara, Pazardzhik Province, Septemvri Municipality, Bulgaria
- Varvara, Chalkidiki, Greece
- Varvara, Tearce, Tearce Municipality, Republic of North Macedonia

== Books ==
- Varvara, US title of 1956 novel Sea of Glass by Dennis Parry

== People ==
- Varvara (singer) (Elena Vladimirovna Susova; born 1973), Russian singer
- Varvara Akritidou (born 1981), Greek judoka
- Varvara Asenkova (1817 — 1841), Russian actress of the Imperial Alexandrinsky Theatre.
- Varvara Annenkova (1795–1866), Russian poet
- Varvara Bakhmeteva (1815–1851), Mikhail Lermontov's muse
- Varvara Baruzdina (1862–1941), Russian painter
- Varvara Barysheva (born 1977), Russian speed skater
- Varvara Brilliant-Lerman (1888–1954), Russian plant physiologist
- Varvara Bubnova (1886–1983), Russian painter and pedagogue
- Varvara Dukhonskaya (1854 — 1931), Russian writer, participant in two round-the-world voyages
- Varvara Fasoi (born 1991), Greek road cyclist
- Varvara Filiou (born 1994), Greek rhythmic gymnast and coach
- Varvara Flink (1996), Russian tennis player
- Varvara Golitsyna (née Engelhardt; 1752–1815), Russian lady in waiting and noble
- Varvara Gracheva (born 2000), Russian-French tennis player
- Varvara Ivanova (born 1987), Russian virtuoso harpist
- Varvara Lepchenko (born 1986), former Uzbekistani and now American tennis player
- Varvara Massalitinova (1878–1945), Russian theatre and film actress
- Varvara Mestnikova (born 1995), Russian chess player
- Varvara Rudneva (c. 1841 – 1899), second Russian women physician
- Varvara Salenkova (born 2007), Israeli rhythmic gymnast
- Varvara Saulina (born 1992), Russian chess player
- Varvara Stepanova (1894–1958), Russian artist
- Varvara Subbotina (born 2001), Russian synchronized swimmer
- Varvara Yakovleva (c. 1880 – 1918), Russian Orthodox saint
- Varvara Yakovleva (politician) (1885–1941), Russian politician
- Varvara Zelenskaya (born 1972), Russian alpine skier
- Varvara Zubova (born 2002), Russian gymnast

== Computing ==
- Varvara, the computing system developed by Hundred Rabbits

== Songs ==
- Varvara, the song by Bi-2 band. The song was included on the second studio album, which was recorded in the Australian Toyland Studio during 1998 and released in 2000.
