= Fakhrutdinov =

Fakhrutdinov (Russian: Фахрутдинов, Tatar: Фәхрутдинов) or Fakhrutdinova (Russian: Фахрутдинова, Tatar: Фәхрутдинова) is a Russian surname of Tatar origin. Notable people with this surname include:

- Alise Fakhrutdinova (born 1990), Russian-Uzbek modern pentathlete
- Marat Fakhrutdinov (born 1988), Russian ice hockey player
- Rustyam Fakhrutdinov (born 1963), Russian footballer
- Timur Fakhrutdinov (born 2001), Russian chess player
