= Berbatov =

Berbatov (masculine) or Berbatova (feminine) is a surname. Notable people with the surname include:

- Dimitar Berbatov (born 1981), Bulgarian football player
- Kiprian Berbatov (born 1996), Bulgarian chess player
