= Aleksandr Kharitonov =

Aleksandr Kharitonov may refer to:

- Aleksandr Kharitonov (politician) (born 1971), Ukrainian politician
- Aleksandr Kharitonov (footballer) (born 1983), Russian footballer
- Alexander Kharitonov (ice hockey) (born 1976), Russian ice hockey player
- Alexandr Kharitonov (chess player) (born 1986), Russian chess player
