= Daneliya =

Daneliya or Danelia (Georgian: დანელია; Kazakh: Данэлия) is a Georgian surname and a Kazakh given name. It may refer to the following people:

Given name

- Daneliya Tuleshova (born 2006), Kazakh singer

Surname

- Georgiy Daneliya (1930–2019), Soviet and Russian film director and screenwriter of Georgian origin
- Mariam Danelia (born 1994), Georgian chess player
