= Tigran Nalbandian =

Armenian chess grandmaster (1975–2025)

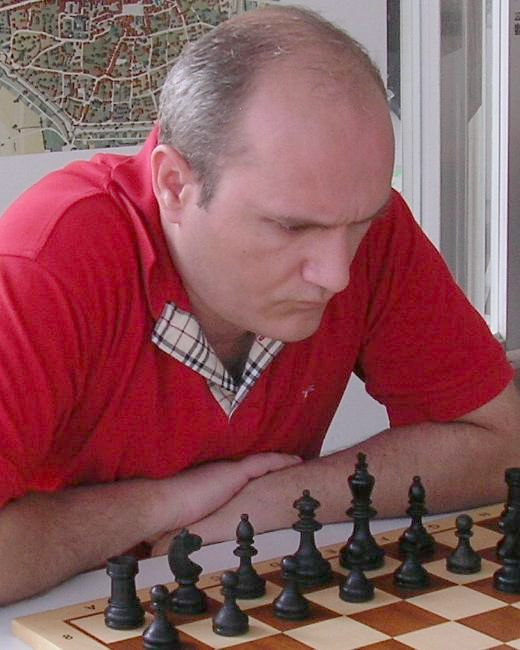
- Nalbandian in 2010

Personal information
- Native name: Տիգրան Նալբանդյան
- Born: 5 June 1975 Yerevan, Armenian SSR, Soviet Union
- Died: 28 June 2025 (aged 50) Yerevan, Armenia

Chess career
- Country: Soviet Union (until 1991); Armenia (from 1991)
- Title: Grandmaster (2004)
- Peak rating: 2527 (October 2005)

Tigran Vahani Nalbandian (Armenian: Տիգրան Նալբանդյան; [ˈtiɡˈɾɑn nɑlˈbɑndjɑn]; 5 June 1975 – 28 June 2025) was an Armenian chess grandmaster.

== Chess career ==
Nalbandian was a graduate of the Henrik Kasparian chess school, alongside other Armenian grandmasters Levon Aronian, Gabriel Sargissian, and Hrant Melkumyan. He coached grandmaster Robert Aghasaryan, and was also the coach of the Armenian team that won the 37th Chess Olympiad in 2006 and 38th Chess Olympiad in 2008.

In July 2010, he won the Dortmund Open with a score of 7/9.

In September 2019, he became the head of a new chess school that opened in the Russian Centre of Science and Culture in Yerevan.

== Personal life and death ==
Nalbandian was born on 5 June 1975 in Yerevan, in what was then the Armenian SSR of the Soviet Union. He died from a heart attack in Yerevan, on 28 June 2025, at the age of 50. A memorial service was held at Saint John the Baptist Church on 29 June.
