= European Youth Chess Championship =

The European Youth Chess Championship is organized by the European Chess Union (ECU) in groups under 8, 10, 12, 14, 16 and 18 years old.

== History ==
The first tournament was held in 1991, and the under 8 category was introduced in 2007.

Until 2002 there was also a tournament for the under 20 group (see European Junior Chess Championship). There are also specific tournaments for girls only, in the same age categories.

1. Under 8 (Since 2007)
2. Under 10
3. Under 12
4. Under 14
5. Under 16
6. Under 18 (Since 1994)

== Editions ==
#	Year	Host City	Host Country	Events
Standard (Classic)
1	1991	Mamaia	Romania	8
2	1992	Rimavská Sobota	Czech Republic	8
3	1993	Szombathely	Hungary	8
4	1994	Băile Herculane	Romania	10
5	1995	Verdun	France	10
6	1996	Rimavská Sobota	Slovakia	10
7	1997	Tallinn	Estonia	10
8	1998	Mureck	Austria	10
9	1999	Litochoro	Greece	10
Standard (Classic), Rapid, Blitz
10	2000	Kallithea	Greece	10
11	2001	Kallithea	Greece	10
12	2002	Peñíscola	Spain	10
13	2003	Budva	Serbia and Montenegro	10
14	2004	Ürgüp	Turkey	10
15	2005	Herceg Novi	Serbia and Montenegro	10
16	2006	Herceg Novi	Montenegro	10
17	2007	Šibenik	Croatia	12
18	2008	Herceg Novi	Montenegro	12
19	2009	Fermo	Italy	12
20	2010	Batumi	Georgia	12
21	2011	Albena	Bulgaria	12
22	2012	Prague	Czech Republic	12
23	2013	Budva	Montenegro	12
24	2014	Batumi	Georgia	12
25	2015	Poreč	Croatia	12
26	2016	Prague	Czech Republic	12
27	2017	Mamaia	Romania	12
28	2018	Riga	Latvia	12
29	2019	Bratislava	Slovakia	12
30	2022	Antalya	Turkey	12
31	2023	Mamaia	Romania	12
32	2024	Prague	Czech Republic	12
33	2025	Budva	Montenegro	12
34	2026	Hersonissos	Greece	12

- 2020 and 2021 not held.

== Medals ==
=== 2018 ===
==== Standard ====
Rank	Nation	Gold	Silver	Bronze	Total
1	Russia	7	6	3	16
2	Azerbaijan	2	0	0	2
3	Belarus	1	1	3	5
4	Greece	1	0	0	1
4	Italy	1	0	0	1
6	Armenia	0	1	0	1
6	Czech Republic	0	1	0	1
6	France	0	1	0	1
6	Germany	0	1	0	1
6	Poland	0	1	0	1
11	Bulgaria	0	0	2	2
12	Denmark	0	0	1	1
12	England	0	0	1	1
12	Israel	0	0	1	1
12	Ukraine	0	0	1	1
Totals (15 entries)		12	12	12	36

== Boys winners ==
Year	Location	U8	U10	U12	U14	U16	U18
1991	(Romania) Mamaia		(France) Adrien Leroy	(Hungary) Peter Leko	(Czechoslovakia) Tomáš Oral	(Romania) Andrei Istrățescu	
1992	(Czechoslovakia) Rimavská Sobota		(Poland) Krzysztof Gratka	(Hungary) Péter Ács	(Hungary) Peter Leko	(Russia) Vadim Zvjaginsev	
1993	(Hungary) Szombathely		(France) Étienne Bacrot	(Georgia (country)) Valeriane Gaprindashvili	(Albania) Erald Dervishi	(Poland) Robert Kempiński	
1994	(Romania) Băile Herculane		(Russia) Gadir Guseinov	(Georgia (country)) Valeriane Gaprindashvili	(England) Karl Mah	(Belarus) Aliaksei Charnushevich	(Poland) Robert Kempiński
1995	(France) Verdun		(Latvia) Arkadij Naiditsch	(France) Étienne Bacrot	(Ukraine) Sergey Fedorchuk	(Czech Republic) Pavel Šimáček	(Poland) Robert Kempiński
1996	(Slovakia) Rimavská Sobota		(Azerbaijan) Teimour Radjabov	(Ukraine) Yuri Drozdovskij	(Ukraine) Evgeni Kobylkin	(Germany) Fabian Doettling	(Ukraine) Ruslan Ponomariov
1997	(Estonia) Tallinn		(Azerbaijan) Teimour Radjabov	(Russia) Ilya Zarezenko	(Ukraine) Yuri Drozdovskij	(Israel) Alexander Kundin	(Georgia (country)) Mikheil Mchedlishvili
1998	(Austria) Mureck		(Ukraine) Dmytro Tishyn	(Azerbaijan) Teimour Radjabov	(Russia) Alexander Riazantsev	(Armenia) Gabriel Sargissian	(Netherlands) Dennis de Vreugt
1999	(Greece) Litochoro		(Ukraine) Sergey Karjakin	(Federal Republic of Yugoslavia) Borki Predojević	(Azerbaijan) Nidjat Mamedov	(Russia) Sergey Grigoriants	(Azerbaijan) Teimour Radjabov
2000	(Greece) Kallithea		(Russia) Ian Nepomniachtchi	(Russia) Evgeny Romanov	(Netherlands) Mark Erwich	(Slovakia) Ján Markoš	(Russia) Artyom Timofeev
2001	(Greece) Kallithea		(Ukraine) Vladimir Onischuk	(Russia) Ian Nepomniachtchi	(Federal Republic of Yugoslavia) Borki Predojević	(Russia) Ernesto Inarkiev	(Georgia (country)) Zviad Izoria
2002	(Spain) Peñíscola		(Azerbaijan) Eltaj Safarli	(Russia) Ian Nepomniachtchi	(Russia) Evgeny Romanov	(Russia) Aleksandr Kharitonov	(Azerbaijan) Shakhriyar Mamedyarov
2003	(Serbia and Montenegro) Budva		(Armenia) Samvel Ter-Sahakyan	(Azerbaijan) Eltaj Safarli	(Belarus) Sergei Zhigalko	(Hungary) Csaba Balogh	(Poland) Mateusz Bartel
2004	(Turkey) Ürgüp		(Armenia) Robert Aghasaryan	(Russia) Sanan Sjugirov	(Georgia (country)) Giorgi Margvelashvili	(Azerbaijan) Rauf Mamedov	(Poland) Radosław Wojtaszek
2005	(Serbia and Montenegro) Herceg Novi		(Russia) Konstantin Nikologorskiy	(Russia) Sanan Sjugirov	(Georgia (country)) Davit Benidze	(Armenia) Zaven Andriasian	(Poland) Paweł Czarnota
2006	(Montenegro) Herceg Novi		(Russia) Arseny Shurunov	(Russia) Ivan Bukavshin	(Hungary) Peter Prohaszka	(France) Romain Édouard	(Belarus) Sergei Zhigalko
2007	(Croatia) Šibenik	(Russia) Nikita Ayvazyan	(Russia) Kirill Alekseenko	(Ukraine) Illia Nyzhnyk	(Russia) Sanan Sjugirov	(Azerbaijan) Vugar Rasulov	(Croatia) Ivan Šarić
2008	(Montenegro) Herceg Novi	(Turkey) Denizcan Temizkan	(Turkey) Cemil Can Ali Marandi	(Bulgaria) Kiprian Berbatov	(Russia) Ivan Bukavshin	(Ukraine) Illia Nyzhnyk	(Spain) Xavier Vila Gazquez
2009	(Italy) Fermo	(Azerbaijan) Abdulla Gadimbayli	(Hungary) Benjamin Gledura	(Russia) Evgeny Zanan	(Poland) Kamil Dragun	(Israel) Gil Popilski	(Armenia) Samvel Ter-Sahakyan
2010	(Georgia (country)) Batumi	(Azerbaijan) Abdulla Gadimbayli	(Slovakia) Viktor Gažík	(Turkey) Cemil Can Ali Marandi	(Ukraine) Olexandr Bortnyk	(Russia) Ivan Bukavshin	(Azerbaijan) Vasif Durarbayli
2011	(Bulgaria) Albena	(Hungary) Alex Krstulovic	(Greece) Evgenios Ioannidis	(Armenia) Haik M. Martirosyan	(Turkey) Cemil Can Ali Marandi	(Ukraine) Olexandr Bortnyk	(Sweden) Nils Grandelius
2012	(Czech Republic) Prague	(Bulgaria) Tsvetan Stoyanov	(Russia) Andrey Esipenko	(Armenia) Haik M. Martirosyan	(Poland) Jan-Krzysztof Duda	(Poland) Kacper Drozdowski	(Russia) Vadim Moiseenko
2013	(Montenegro) Budva	(Azerbaijan) Aydin Suleymanli	(Turkey) Kağan Aydın Çelebi	(Ukraine) Viktor Matviishen	(Netherlands) Jorden Van Foreest	(Russia) Kirill Alekseenko	(Russia) Vladimir Fedoseev
2014	(Georgia (country)) Batumi	(Russia) Ilya Makoveev	(Armenia) Mamikon Gharibyan	(Ukraine) Viktor Matviishen	(Russia) Timur Fakhrutdinov	(Turkey) Cemil Can Ali Marandi	(Israel) Avital Boruchovsky
2015	(Croatia) Poreč	(Belarus) Mikhei Navumenka	(Russia) Ilya Makoveev	(Russia) Kirill Shubin	(Russia) Sergei Lobanov	(Germany) Leonid Sawlin	(Turkey) Cemil Can Ali Marandi
2016	(Czech Republic) Prague	(Russia) Artem Pingin	(Russia) Volodar Murzin	(Armenia) Mamikon Gharibyan	(Spain) Salvador Guerra Rivera	(Russia) Timur Fakhrutdinov	(Armenia) Manuel Petrosyan
2017	(Romania) Mamaia	(Hungary) Giang Tran Nam	(France) Marc'Andria Maurizzi	(Azerbaijan) Aydin Suleymanli	(Denmark) Jonas Buhl Bjerre	(Russia) Andrey Esipenko	(Denmark) Jesper Søndergaard Thybo
2018	(Latvia) Riga	(Azerbaijan) Jahandar Azadaliyev	(Russia) Artem Pingin	(Russia) Volodar Murzin	(Russia) Stefan Pogosyan	(Italy) Francesco Sonis	(Greece) Evgenios Ioannidis
2019	(Slovakia) Bratislava	(Turkey) Yağız Kaan Erdoğmuş	(Russia) Savva Vetokhin	(France) Marc'Andria Maurizzi	(Slovakia) Sebastian Kostolanský	(Armenia) Armen Barseghyan	(Czech Republic) Thai Dai Van Nguyen
2022	(Turkey) Antalya	(FIDE) Roman Shogdzhiev	(Turkey) Baver Yilmaz	(Poland) Patryk Cieslak	(Ukraine) Svyatoslav Bazakutsa	(France) Timothe Razafindratsima	(FIDE) Rudik Makarian
2023	(Romania) Mamaia	(Azerbaijan) Mahammad Kazimzade	(Romania) Vladimir Sofronie	(Azerbaijan) Khagan Ahmad	(Azerbaijan) Rustam Rustamov	(Poland) Jakub Seemann	(Armenia) Arsen Davtyan
2024	(Czech Republic) Prague	(England) Junyan Hu	(Turkey) Ali Poyraz Uzdemir	(Poland) Wiktor Golis	(Czech Republic) Václav Finěk	(France) Marco Materia	(France) Timothe Razafindratsima
2025	(Montenegro) Budva	(Ukraine) Myron Netrebka	(France) Luca Protopopescu	(Turkey) Eren Elci	(Azerbaijan) Khagan Ahmad	(Germany) Mykola Korchynskyi	(Armenia) Vahe Sukiasyan
2026	(Greece) Hersonissos	(Lithuania) Nikolas Bausys	(France) Han Nam Pham	(Finland) Zhang Yiming	(Israel) Noam Sason	(Albania) Mateu Boçi	(Armenia) Vahe Sukiasyan

== Girls winners ==
Year	Location	U8	U10	U12	U14	U16	U18
1991	(Romania) Mamaia		(Romania) Sabina Popescu	(Soviet Union) Sofiko Tkeshelashvili	(Soviet Union) Maia Lomineishvili	(Soviet Union) Ilaha Kadimova	
1992	(Czechoslovakia) Rimavská Sobota		(Czechoslovakia) Regina Pokorná	(Poland) Alina Tarachowicz	(Bulgaria) Antoaneta Stefanova	(Ukraine) Inna Gaponenko	
1993	(Hungary) Szombathely		(Lithuania) Viktorija Čmilytė	(Poland) Iweta Radziewicz	(Ukraine) Natalia Zhukova	(Ukraine) Natalia Kiseleva	
1994	(Romania) Băile Herculane		(Russia) Alexandra Kosteniuk	(Georgia (country)) Ana Matnadze	(Poland) Iweta Radziewicz	(Ukraine) Natalia Zhukova	(Hungary) Mónika Grábics
1995	(France) Verdun		(Russia) Nadezhda Kosintseva	(Georgia (country)) Ana Matnadze	(Moldova) Cristina Moshina	(Romania) Szidonia Vajda	(Poland) Marta Zielinska
1996	(Slovakia) Rimavská Sobota		(Russia) Tatiana Kosintseva	(Russia) Alexandra Kosteniuk	(Moldova) Cristina Moshina	(Ukraine) Vladislava Kalinina	(Poland) Monika Bobrowska
1997	(Estonia) Tallinn		(Georgia (country)) Nana Dzagnidze	(Russia) Nadezhda Kosintseva	(Georgia (country)) Ana Matnadze	(Russia) Ekaterina Polovnikova	(Russia) Anna Dorofeeva
1998	(Austria) Mureck		(Ukraine) Anna Muzychuk	(France) Marie Sebag	(Georgia (country)) Lela Javakhishvili	(Georgia (country)) Ana Matnadze	(Latvia) Dana Reizniece
1999	(Greece) Litochoro		(Romania) Silvia-Raluca Sgîrcea	(Georgia (country)) Nana Dzagnidze	(France) Marie Sebag	(Georgia (country)) Ana Matnadze	(Latvia) Dana Reizniece
2000	(Greece) Kallithea		(Ukraine) Anna Muzychuk	(Russia) Valentina Gunina	(Russia) Tamara Chistiakova	(Russia) Natalia Pogonina	(Russia) Nadezhda Kosintseva
2001	(Greece) Kallithea		(Belarus) Alena Tairova	(Romania) Iozefina Păuleţ	(Ukraine) Kateryna Lahno	(Russia) Maria Kursova	(Georgia (country)) Inga Charkhalashvili
2002	(Spain) Peñíscola		(Ukraine) Mariya Muzychuk	(Ukraine) Anna Muzychuk	(Azerbaijan) Turkan Mamedyarova	(France) Marie Sebag	(Romania) Alina Motoc
2003	(Serbia and Montenegro) Budva		(Georgia (country)) Nazí Paikidze	(Russia) Anastasia Bodnaruk	(Ukraine) Anna Muzychuk	(Russia) Maria Fominykh	(Russia) Natalia Pogonina
2004	(Turkey) Ürgüp		(Georgia (country)) Meri Arabidze	(Croatia) Lara Stock	(Slovenia) Anna Muzychuk	(Russia) Valentina Gunina	(Georgia (country)) Salome Melia
2005	(Serbia and Montenegro) Herceg Novi		(Russia) Varvara Mestnikova	(Georgia (country)) Nazí Paikidze	(Russia) Varvara Repina	(Russia) Inna Ivakhinova	(Georgia (country)) Salome Melia
2006	(Montenegro) Herceg Novi		(Romania) Daria-Ioana Vişănescu	(Georgia (country)) Meri Arabidze	(Russia) Varvara Repina	(Turkey) Kübra Öztürk	(Poland) Anna Gasik
2007	(Croatia) Šibenik	(Azerbaijan) Aydan Hojjatova	(France) Cécile Haussernot	(Poland) Aleksandra Lach	(Georgia (country)) Nazí Paikidze	(Turkey) Kübra Öztürk	(Russia) Inna Ivakhinova
2008	(Montenegro) Herceg Novi	(Azerbaijan) Gunay Mammadzada	(Russia) Liza Kisteneva	(Russia) Anna Styazhkina	(Georgia (country)) Meri Arabidze	(Georgia (country)) Nazí Paikidze	(Czech Republic) Kateřina Němcová
2009	(Italy) Fermo	(Turkey) Ece Alkim Erece	(Russia) Anna Vasenina	(France) Cécile Haussernot	(Israel) Marsel Efroimski	(Poland) Katarzyna Adamowicz	(Russia) Olga Girya
2010	(Georgia (country)) Batumi	(Bulgaria) Gabriela Antova	(Poland) Oliwia Kiołbasa	(Russia) Alexandra Goryachkina	(Azerbaijan) Ulviyya Fataliyeva	(Georgia (country)) Mariam Danelia	(Georgia (country)) Keti Tsatsalashvili
2011	(Bulgaria) Albena	(Bulgaria) Nurgyul Salimova	(Poland) Alicja Śliwicka	(Russia) Anna Vasenina	(Russia) Aleksandra Goryachkina	(Russia) Maria Severina	(Moldova) Diana Baciu
2012	(Czech Republic) Prague	(Russia) Mariya Kutyanina	(Russia) Anastasia Zotova	(Greece) Anastasia Avramidou	(Belarus) Katsiaryna Beinenson	(Ukraine) Marja Tantsiura	(Russia) Aleksandra Goryachkina
2013	(Montenegro) Budva	(Poland) Laura Czernikowska	(Israel) Anastasia Vuller	(Russia) Polina Shuvalova	(Azerbaijan) Gunay Mammadzada	(Russia) Anna Styazhkina	(Belarus) Nastassia Ziaziulkina
2014	(Georgia (country)) Batumi	(Russia) Emilia Zavivaeva	(Azerbaijan) Malak Ismayil	(Russia) Ekaterina Goltseva	(Greece) Anastasia Avramidou	(Estonia) Mai Narva	(Azerbaijan) Ulviyya Fataliyeva
2015	(Croatia) Poreč	(Ukraine) Veronika Veremyuk	(Russia) Galina Mironenko	(Russia) Elizaveta Solozhenkina	(Russia) Anna Kochukova	(Netherlands) Anna-Maja Kazarian	(Georgia (country)) Nino Khomeriki
2016	(Czech Republic) Prague	(Russia) Alexandra Shvedova	(Hungary) Zsóka Gaál	(Turkey) Sıla Çağlar	(Russia) Aleksandra Maltsevskaya	(Germany) Fiona Sieber	(Georgia (country)) Nino Khomeriki
2017	(Romania) Mamaia	(Russia) Sofya Svergina	(Russia) Veronika Shubenkova	(Russia) Galina Mironenko	(Azerbaijan) Govhar Beydullayeva	(Belarus) Olga Badelka	(Armenia) Sona Asatryan
2018	(Latvia) Riga	(Belarus) Ekaterina Zubkovskaya	(Russia) Alexandra Shvedova	(Russia) Olga Karmanova	(Azerbaijan) Ayan Allahverdiyeva	(Russia) Kamaliya Bulatova	(Russia) Aleksandra Dimitrova
2019	(Slovakia) Bratislava	(Azerbaijan) Dinara Huseynova	(Russia) Anna Shukhman	(Russia) Alexandra Shvedova	(Azerbaijan) Ayan Allahverdiyeva	(Poland) Patrycja Waszczuk	(Poland) Alicja Śliwicka
2022	(Turkey) Antalya	(FIDE) Sofya Kokareva	(Greece) Marianta Lampou	(FIDE) Diana Preobrazhenskaya	(FIDE) Valeria Kleymenova	(Ukraine) Mariya Manko	(Armenia) Mariam Mkrtchyan
2023	(Romania) Mamaia	(Azerbaijan) Mehriban Ahmadli	(Romania) Maria Anistoroaei	(Poland) Kinga Lajdamik	(Georgia (country)) Kesaria Mgeladze	(Latvia) Agnesa Stepania Ter-Avetisjana	(Poland) Martyna Wikar
2024	(Czech Republic) Prague	(Romania) Carla-Ioana Marchis	(Ukraine) Svitlana Russieva	(Poland) Varvara Matskevich	(Serbia) Vera Vujović	(Poland) Klara Szczotka	(Israel) Noga Orian
2025	(Montenegro) Budva	(Finland) Stella Zhu	(Ukraine) Daria Kravchuk	(Latvia) Alona Tolmaceva	(Serbia) Vera Vujović	(France) Lucia Stoll	(Poland) Maria Siekańska
2026	(Greece) Hersonissos	(Turkey) Melike Eliz Karahan	(Georgia (country)) Lile Svanadze	(Poland) Lila Rządkowska	(Poland) Kaja Rządkowska	(FIDE) Veranika Abramkina	(Azerbaijan) Narmin Abdinova

== 2024 ==
2024 European Youth Rapid and Blitz Chess Championship (42 Events)

Results:

1. Main Event open - 6 Events
2. Main Event girls - 6 Events
3. Rapid Blitz open - 12 Events
4. Rapid Blitz girls - 12 Events
5. Team Rapid open - 3 Events
6. Team Rapid girls - 3 Events

23rd European Youth Blitz Championship 2024.

- Solving Competition

== Results ==
- http://www.torneionline.com/loto.php?path=albi/02_Campionati_Europei
- U18 Boys
- U18 Girls
- U16 Boys
- U16 Girls
- U14 Boys
- U14 Girls
- U12 Boys
- U12 Girls
- U10 Boys
- U10 Girls
- U8 Boys
- U8 Girls

== See also ==
- European Junior Chess Championship
- European Individual Chess Championship
- European Senior Chess Championship
- European Team Chess Championship
- North American Youth Chess Championship
- World Junior Chess Championship
- World Youth Chess Championship
