= Fair House of Joy =

Fair House of Joy may refer to:

- "Fair House of Joy", a song by Roger Quilter
- Fair House of Joy, a 1950 novel by Dennis Parry
