= Moiseenko =

Moiseenko or Moiseyenko is a surname. Notable people with the surname include:

- Alexander Moiseenko (born 1980), Ukrainian chess grandmaster
- Evsey Moiseenko (1916–1988), Soviet Russian painter
- Vadim Moiseenko (born 1994), Russian chess grandmaster
