= Liza Kisteneva =

Russian chess player (born 1998)

Personal information
- Born: 17 October 1998 (age 27)

Chess career
- Country: Russia (until 2023); England (since 2023)
- Title: Women FIDE Master (2009)
- Peak rating: 2083 (June 2023)

Liza Kisteneva (Russian: Елизавета Кистенева; born 17 October 1998) is a Russian chess player who holds the title of Woman FIDE Master (WFM) (2009).

== Biography ==
Liza Kisteneva was a student of Moscow chess school. She played for Russia in European Youth Chess Championships and World Youth Chess Championships in the different age groups and best result reached in 2008 in Herceg Novi, when Liza Kisteneva won European Youth Chess Championship in the U10 girl's age group. In 2012, in Prague she won bronze medal in European Youth Chess Championship in the U14 girl's age group. In 2012, in Jūrmala she won Alexei Shirov's Winter Cup for Girls. In 2020, she came second in Women's Blitz Caplin British Online Chess Championship.
