= Xavier Vila Gazquez =

Spanish chess grandmaster (born 1990)

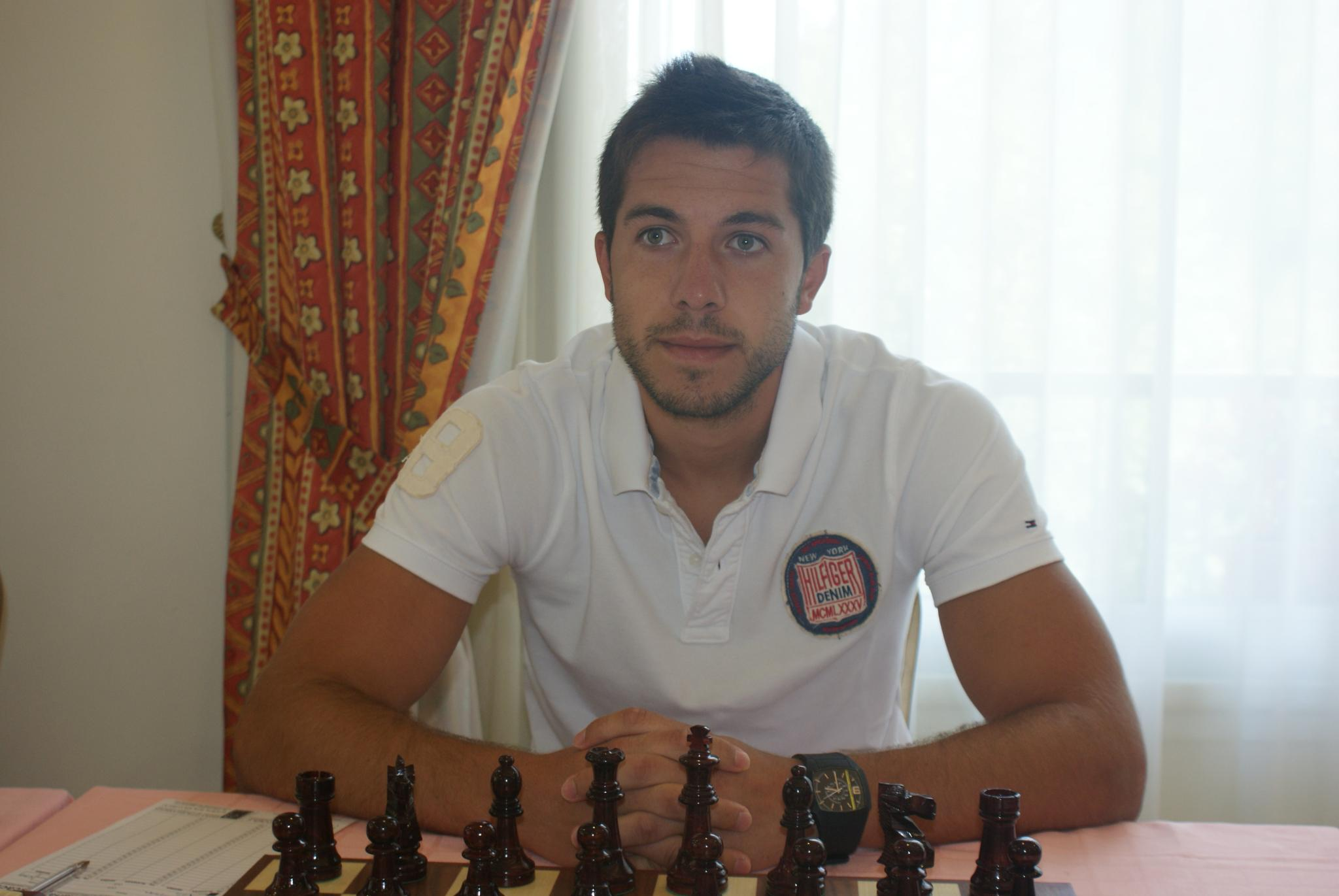
- Vila at the 2012 Andorra Open

Personal information
- Born: 8 March 1990 (age 36) Tarragona, Spain

Chess career
- Country: Spain
- Title: Grandmaster (2011)
- FIDE rating: 2449 (July 2026)
- Peak rating: 2494 (May 2011)

Xavier Vila Gazquez (born 8 March 1990) is a Spanish chess grandmaster (2011).

== Biography ==
Xavier Vila Gazquez has repeatedly represented Spain at European Youth Chess Championships and World Youth Chess Championships, where he won European Youth Chess Championship in 2008 in the U18 age group. Four times he won medals in Spanish Youth Chess Championships in different age groups: gold (2006) and three silver (2004, 2005, 2007). In 2008, he represented Spain at the European Boys' U18 Team Chess Championship.

Xavier Vila Gazquez is winner of many international chess tournaments, including two Barcelona international chess tournaments (2002, 2004).

In 2007, he was awarded the FIDE International Master (IM) title and received the FIDE Grandmaster (GM) title four year later.
