= Krzysztof Gratka =

Polish chess player

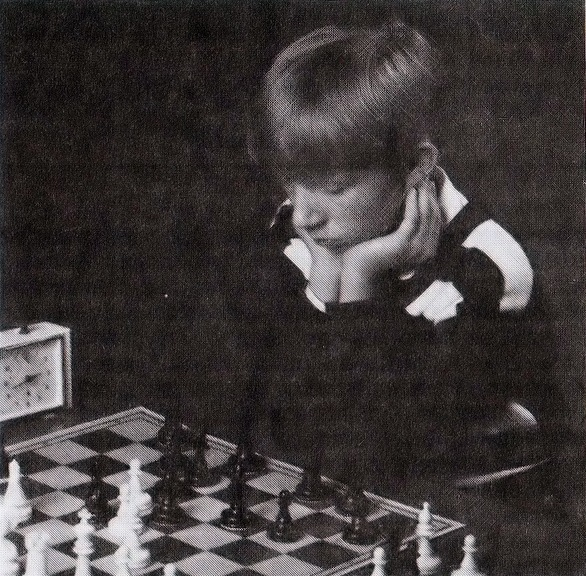
- Krzysztof Gratka in 1992

Personal information
- Born: 15 July 1982 (age 43) Łódź, Poland

Chess career
- Country: Poland
- Title: FIDE Master (1992)
- Peak rating: 2373 (July 1999)

Krzysztof Gratka (born 15 July 1982) is a Polish chess player who holds the title of FIDE Master (FM) (1992).

== Biography ==
Krzysztof Gratka repeatedly represented Poland in the European Youth Chess Championships and World Youth Chess Championships, achieving his best result in 1992 in Rimavská Sobota, when he won the European Youth Chess Championship in the U10 age group. He was awarded the FIDE Master title for this success.

Krzysztof Gratka participated in the Polish Youth Chess Championships in different age groups, winning five medals: gold (in 1996 in the U14 age group), two silver (in 1992 in the U10 age group and in 1994 in the U12 age group) and two bronze (in 1995 in the U14 age group and in 1997 in the U16 age group). Between 1991 and 2000, Krzysztof Gratka participated in the finals of the Polish Youth Fast Chess Championship nine times, winning a silver medal in the U14 age group in 1995. He has also won two medals at the Polish Youth Team Chess Championship: gold (2000) and bronze (1999). In 1998, in Kraków, Krzysztof Gratka ranked 2nd in the international chess festival Cracovia in tournament A.

Since 2002, Gratka has rarely participated in chess tournaments.
