= Davit Benidze =

Georgian chess grandmaster (born 1991)

Personal information
- Born: 15 February 1991 (age 35)

Chess career
- Country: Georgia
- Title: Grandmaster (2013)
- Peak rating: 2530 (March 2012)

Davit Benidze (Georgian: დავით ბენიძე; born 15 February 1991) is a Georgian chess player who received the FIDE title of Grandmaster (GM) in October 2013.

== Biography ==
Benidze has repeatedly represented Georgia at the European Youth Chess Championships and World Youth Chess Championships in different age groups, winning four medals: gold in 2005 at the European Youth Chess Championship (U14 age group), silver in 2001 at the World Youth Chess Championship (U10 age group), and two bronze in 2004 at the European Youth Chess Championship (U14 age group) and in 2009 at the European Youth Chess Championship (U18 age group). In 2006, he played for Georgia in the World Youth U16 Chess Olympiad, winning a team silver medal and an individual bronze medal. In 2010, Benidze won a bronze medal at the World Student Championship in Zürich.

He has won numerous international chess tournaments, including first prize or shared first place in the Georgi Tringov memorial in Plovdiv (2012), Kahramanmaraş (2013), Hatay (2013), and Bitlis (2013).

In 2008, Benidze was awarded the International Master (IM) title, and he received the Grandmaster (GM) title five years later.
