= Inna Ivakhinova =

Russian chess player

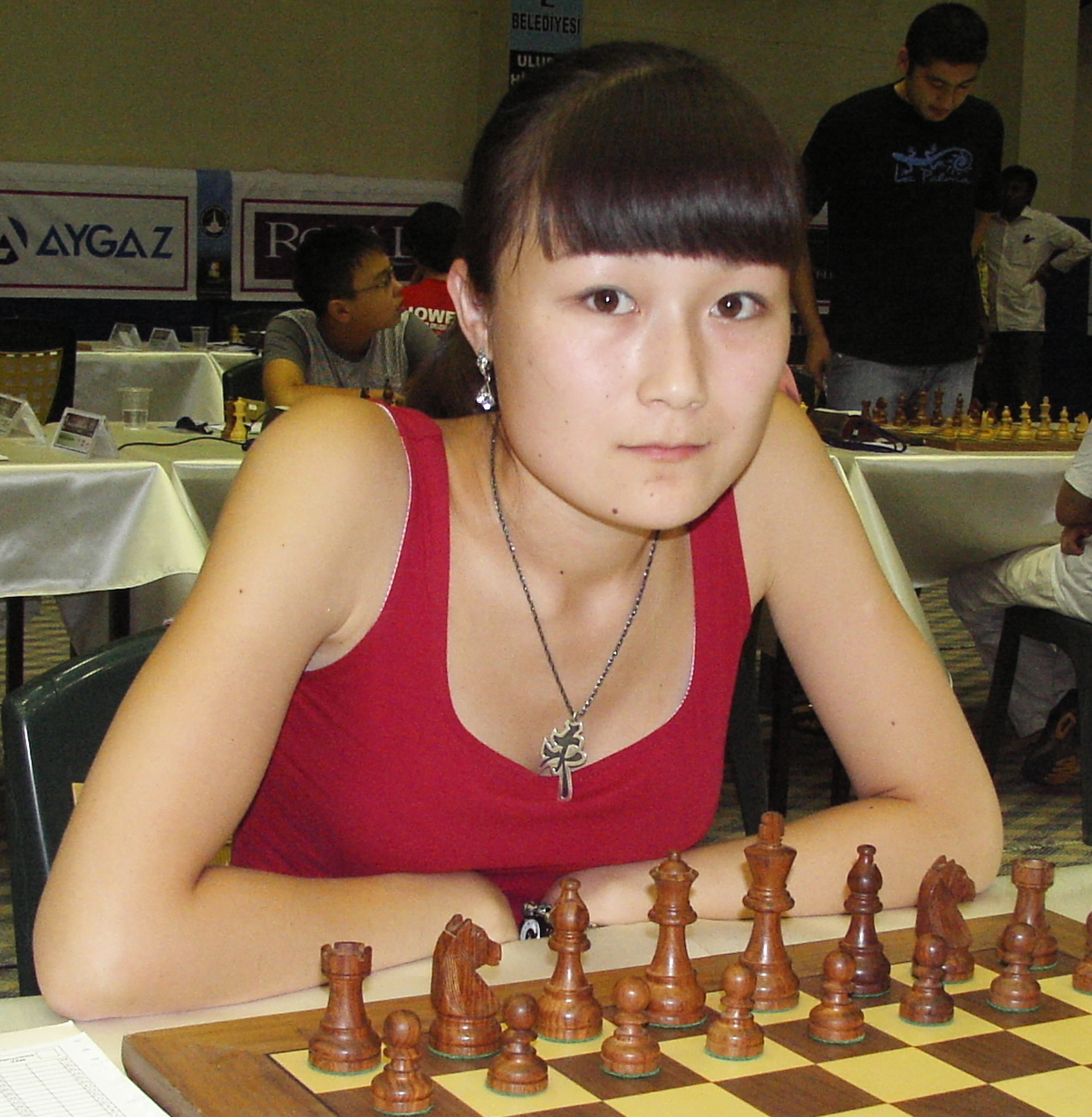
- Ivakhinova in 2003

Personal information
- Full name: Inna Sayanovna Ivakhinova
- Born: 23 February 1989 (age 37) Ulan-Ude, Russia

Chess career
- Country: Russia
- Title: Woman Grandmaster (2012)
- FIDE rating: 2278 (March 2014)
- Peak rating: 2325 (May 2011)

Inna Sayanovna Ivakhinova (Russian: Инна Саяновна Ивахинова; born 23 February 1989) is a Russian chess player who holds the FIDE title of Woman Grandmaster (WGM, 2012).

== Biography ==
Ivakhinova learned to play chess at the age of six. In 2000, she won second place in the Russian girl's chess championship in the U12 age group. In the 2000s, Ivakhinova repeatedly represented Russia at the European Youth Chess Championships in different age groups, where she won two gold medals: in 2005, at the European Youth Chess Championship in the U16 girls age group, and in 2007, at the European Youth Chess Championship in the U18 girls age group. In 2010, Ivanovo she won the Russian Women's Chess Championship First league, but in 2011 she became the winner of the Russian Student Chess Championship.

In 2007, she was awarded the FIDE Woman International Master (WIM) title and received the FIDE Woman Grandmaster (WGM) title six year later.

In 2011, she graduated from Buryat State University Economics and Management Institute. Ivakhinova has established her own chess school for training of young chess players.
