= Alexander Kundin =

Israeli chess player

Personal information
- Native name: אלכסנדר קונדין
- Born: 25 June 1981 (age 45)

Chess career
- Country: Israel
- Title: International Master (2004)
- Peak rating: 2442 (July 2005)

Alexander Kundin (Hebrew: אלכסנדר קונדין; born 25 June 1981) is an Israeli chess International Master (2004).

== Biography ==
Alexander Kundin started playing chess at the age of five. He repeatedly represented Israel at the European Youth Chess Championships and World Youth Chess Championships in different age groups, where he won four medals: gold (in 1997, at the European Youth Chess Championship in the U16 age group), silver (in 1993, at the European Youth Chess Championship in the U12 age group) and two bronze (in 1997, at the World Youth Chess Championship in the U16 age group and in 1999, at the European Youth Chess Championship in the U18 age group). In 2004, Alexander Kundin was awarded the FIDE International Master (IM) title.

Since 2003, he has been participating mainly in team chess tournaments. Alexander Kundin graduated from the Open University at Tel-Aviv and working as an internet chess coach.
