= Keti Tsatsalashvili =

Georgian chess player (born 1992)

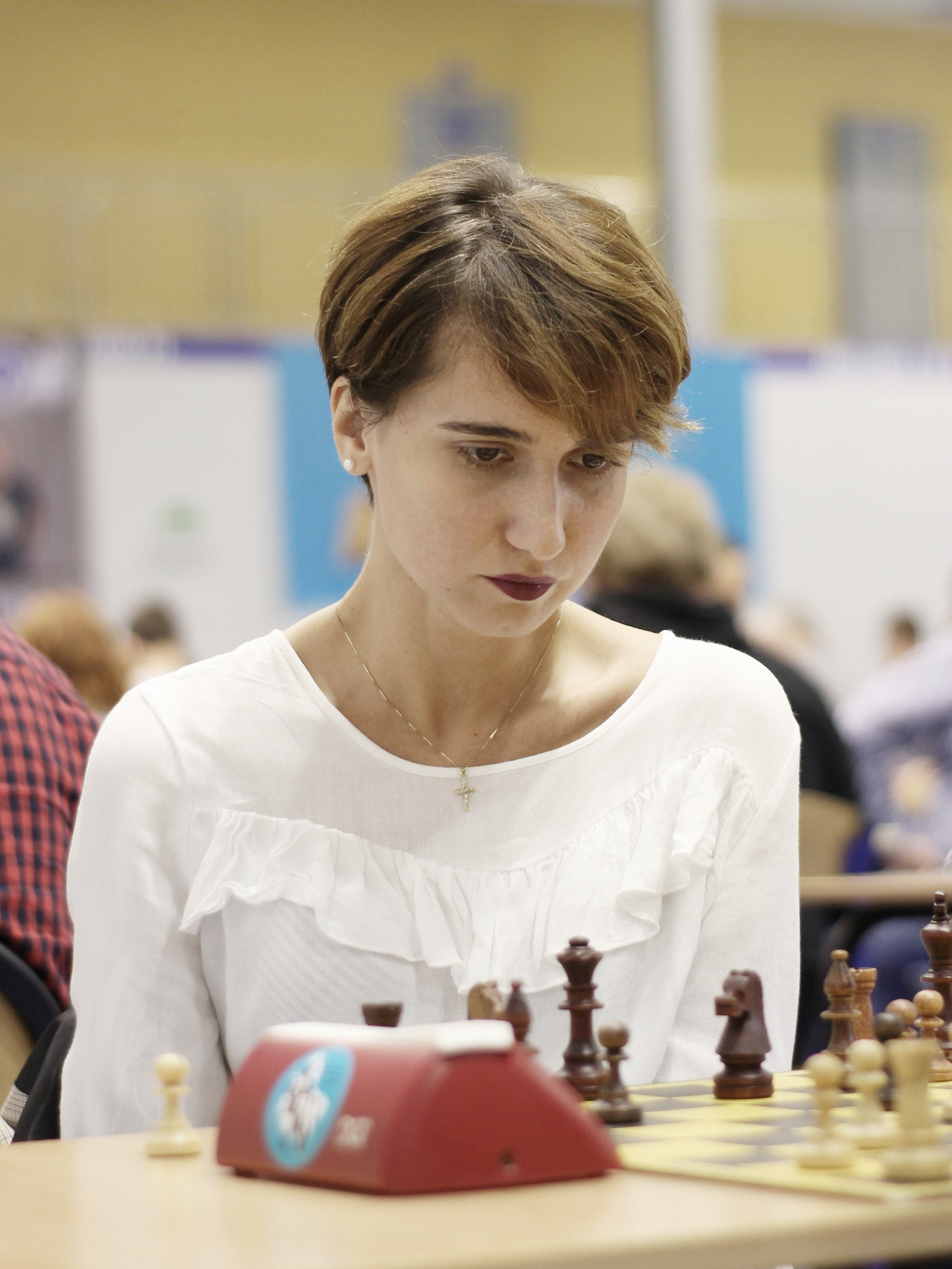
- Keti Tsatsalashvili

Personal information
- Born: 10 June 1992 (age 34) Telavi, Georgia

Chess career
- Country: Georgia
- Title: Woman Grandmaster (2011)
- FIDE rating: 2296 (January 2025)
- Peak rating: 2372 (July 2019)

Twitch information
- Channel: KetiTsatsalashvili
- Years active: 2020–present
- Genre: Gaming
- Game: Chess
- Followers: 18,200

Keti Tsatsalashvili (Georgian: ქეთი წაწალაშვილი; born 10 June 1992) is a Georgian chess player, commentator and streamer. She was awarded the Woman Grandmaster (WGM) title by FIDE in 2011.

== Biography ==
Keti Tsatsalashvili repeatedly represented Georgia at the European Youth Chess Championships and World Youth Chess Championships in different age groups, where she won six medals: two gold (in 2007, at the World Youth Chess Championship in the U16 girls age group and in 2010, at the European Youth Chess Championship in the U18 girls age group), two silver (in 2009, at the World Youth Chess Championship in the U18 girls age group and in 2009, at the European Youth Chess Championship in the U18 girls age group) and two bronze (in 2007, at the European Youth Chess Championship in the U16 girls age group and in 2008, at the World Youth Chess Championship in the U16 girls age group).

Keti Tsatsalashvili has won multiple international chess tournaments, including in 2010, Florencio Campomanes memorial women's chess tournament in Ankara.

In 2008, she was awarded the FIDE International Woman Master (WIM) title and received the FIDE International Woman Grandmaster (WGM) title three years later.
