= Viktor Matviishen =

Ukrainian chess grandmaster (born 2002)

Personal information
- Born: 10 January 2002 (age 24) Vinnytsia, Ukraine

Chess career
- Country: Ukraine
- Title: Grandmaster (2022)
- FIDE rating: 2549 (July 2026)
- Peak rating: 2566 (November 2024)

Viktor Matviishen (Ukrainian: Віктор Матвіїшен; born 10 January 2002) is a Ukrainian chess player who holds the title of grandmaster (2022).

== Biography ==
Viktor Matviishen was a student of the Vinnytsia Chess School. He played for Ukraine in the European Youth Chess Championships and the World Youth Chess Championships in the different age groups and had his best results in 2013 and 2014, when he twice in a row won the European Youth Chess Championship in the U12 age group. In the 2018 World Youth Chess Championships, held in Greece, Viktor Matviishen placed second in the World Youth Chess Championship in the U16 age group. In 2014, he played for Ukraine team in World Youth U16 Chess Olympiad.

Viktor Matviishen is multiple winner of Ukrainian Youth Chess Championships in different age groups. In 2016, he set a peculiar record by winning the Ukrainian Youth Chess Championships in the U16 age group in classical chess, fast chess and blitz chess.

In 2016, Viktor Matviishen won the Fedir Bohatyrchuk Chess Memorial.

In 2017, he was awarded the FIDE International Master (IM) title, and in 2022 he became a grandmaster (GM).
