= Salvador Guerra Rivera =

Spanish chess player

Personal information
- Born: 10 October 2002 (age 23) Marbella, Spain

Chess career
- Country: Spain
- Title: FIDE Master (2016)
- Peak rating: 2405 (September 2016)

Salvador Guerra Rivera (born 10 October 2002) is a Spanish chess FIDE Master (2016).

== Biography ==
In 2016, Salvador Guerra Rivera won the Spanish Youth Chess Championship in two age groups: U14 and U16. He has represented Spain at European Youth Chess Championships and World Youth Chess Championships, winning the European Youth Chess Championship in 2016 in Prague in the U14 age group. After this success, Salvador Guerra Rivera became FIDE master (FM).

In 2017, he won the Málaga City Chess Championship and the international chess tournament Open Casabermeja in Málaga.
