= Evgeny Zanan =

Israeli chess grandmaster (born 1998)

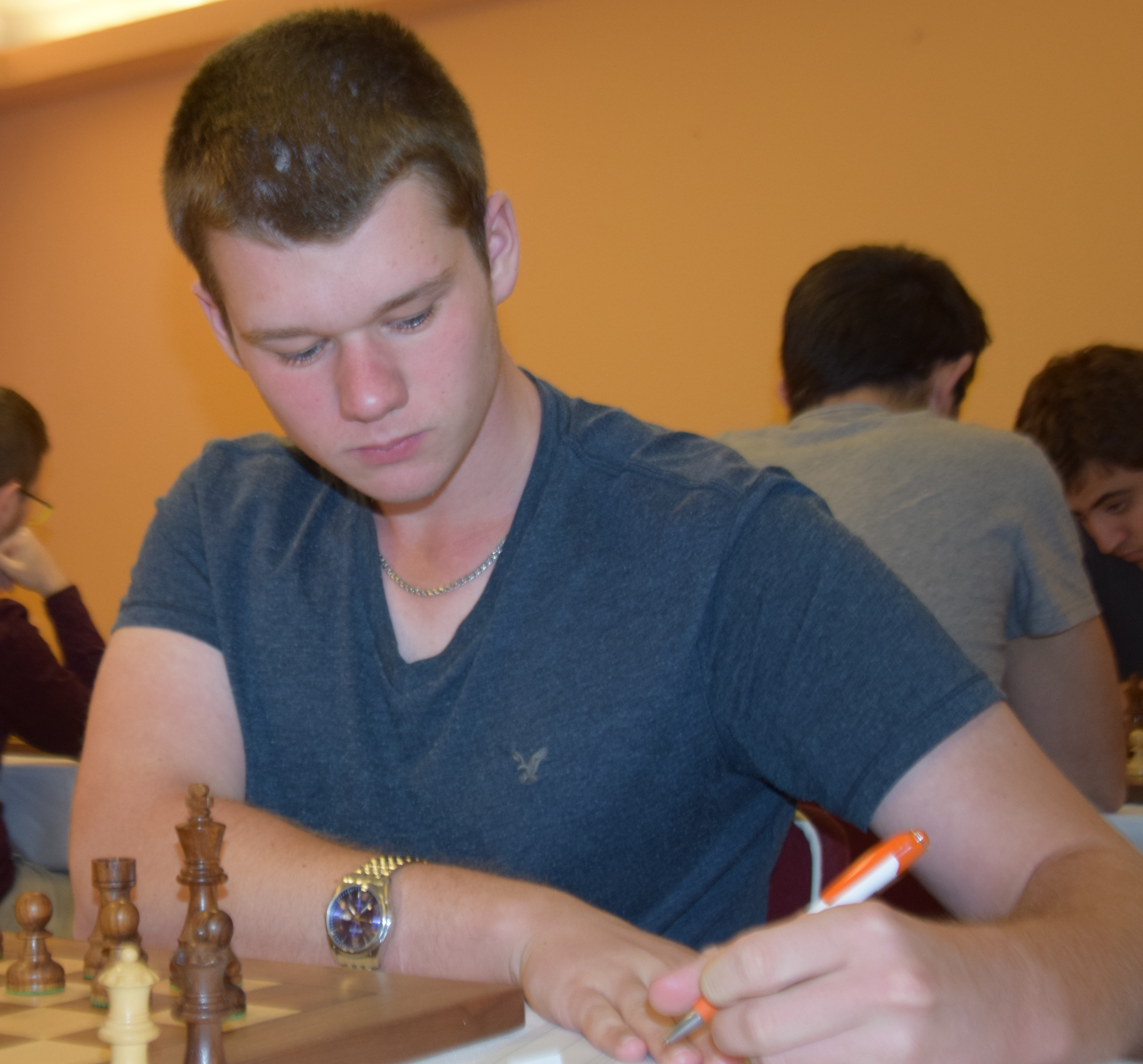
- Zanan at the 2017 Andorra open

Personal information
- Native name: Евгений Занан
- Born: 5 February 1998 (age 28)

Chess career
- Country: Russia (until 2014); Israel (since 2014)
- Title: Grandmaster (2020)
- FIDE rating: 2484 (July 2026)
- Peak rating: 2537 (August 2021)

Evgeny Zanan (Russian: Евгений Занан, Hebrew: יבגני זנן; born 5 February 1998) is a Russian-born Israeli chess player who holds the title of Grandmaster (GM) (2020).

== Biography ==
In 2009, Evgeny Zanan won silver medal in the Russian Youth Chess Championship in U12 age group. He played for Russia in European Youth Chess Championships and World Youth Chess Championships in different age groups and best result reached in 2009 in Fermo, when he won European Youth Chess Championship in the U12 age group. About this success he was awarded the FIDE Master (FM) title.

Moved to Israel in 2010. Evgeny Zanan played in Israel Team Chess Championships for Beersheba chess club, as well as participated in individual chess tournaments.

Evgeny Zanan played for Israel team:

- In 2014 in World Youth U16 Chess Olympiad;
- In 2016 in European Boys' U18 Team Chess Championship.

In 2017, he was awarded the FIDE International Master (IM) title followed by the title of Grandmaster (GM) in 2020.
