= Dmytro Tishyn =

Ukrainian chess player

Personal information
- Born: 1988 (age 37–38)

Chess career
- Country: Ukraine
- Title: International Master (2000)
- FIDE rating: 2293 (July 2011)
- Peak rating: 2375 (January 2004)

Dmytro Tishyn (Ukrainian: Дмитро Тішин; born 1988) is a Ukrainian chess player who holds the title of International Master (IM) (2000).

== Biography ==
Dmytro Tishyn is student of Odessa chess school. He played for Ukraine in European Youth Chess Championships and World Youth Chess Championships in the different age groups and best result reached in 1998 in Mureck, when he won European Youth Chess Championship in the U10 age group. About this success he became FIDE Master (FM) title. Dmytro Tishyn two times has participated in Ukrainian Chess Championship final's (2002, 2003). He three times has participated in the Ukrainian Team Chess Championship with various chess clubs (2002, 2006, 2009). In 2003, Dmytro Tishyn won national chess tournament in Illichivsk.

In 2000, he awarded the FIDE International Master (IM) title. Since 2009, Dmytro Tishyn rarely participate in chess tournaments.
