= Daria-Ioana Vișănescu =

Romanian chess player (born 1996)

Personal information
- Born: 3 August 1996 (age 29) Petrila, Romania

Chess career
- Country: Romania
- Title: Woman FIDE Master (2006)
- Peak rating: 2160 (August 2014)

Daria-Ioana Vișănescu (born 3 August 1996) is a Romanian chess player who holds the title of Woman FIDE Master (WFM) (2006).

== Biography ==
Daria-Ioana Vișănescu learned to play chess at the age of five. At the age of nine, she won for the first time at the Romanian Girl's Chess Championship. In 2006, she won the European Youth Chess Championship for girls in the U10 age group and became a Women FIDE Master (WFM). In the following years she won the Romanian Youth Chess, Fast Chess and Blitz Championships in different girls age groups. In 2012, in Prague Daria-Ioana Vișănescu won a silver medal at the European Youth Chess Championships for girls in the U16 age group (tournament won Marja Tantsiura).

Daria-Ioana Vișănescu two times participated in the European Girls' U18 Team Chess Championships (2011, 2014), where she won silver (2014) medal in team scoring, as well as silver (2011) medal in individual scoring.
