= Denizcan Temizkan =

Turkish chess player

Personal information
- Born: 24 January 2000 (age 26)

Chess career
- Country: Turkey
- Title: FIDE Master (2014)
- Peak rating: 2214 (June 2017)

Denizcan Temizkan (born 24 January 2000) is a Turkish chess player who holds the title of FIDE Master (FM).

== Biography ==
Denizcan Temizkan is a multiple medalist of the Turkish Youth Chess Championships, including two consecutive silver medals in the U13 and U14 age groups (2013, 2014). Denizcan Temizkan repeatedly represented Turkey at the European Youth Chess Championships and World Youth Chess Championships in different age groups. In 2008, in Herceg Novi, he won the European Youth Chess Championship in the U08 age group. In 2009, Denizcan Temizkan won a silver medal in the World School Chess Championship in the U09 age group. In 2013, he won the European School Chess Championship in the U13 age group.
