= Cristina Moshina =

Moldovan chess player (born 1982)

Cristina Mosin
Personal information
- Born: 15 November 1982 (age 43) Kishinev, Moldavian SSR, Soviet Union

Chess career
- Country: Moldova
- Title: Woman International Master (2000)
- Peak rating: 2271 (July 2002)

Cristina Mosin (born 15 November 1982) is a Moldovan chess player who holds the FIDE title of Woman International Master (WIM, 2000).

== Biography ==
At the end of the 1990s, Cristina Mosin was one of the best young female chess players in Moldova. She twice in a row won European Youth Chess Championship in U14 girl's age group (1995, 1996). In 1995, Cristina Mosin participated in Women's World Chess Championship Interzonal Tournament in Chişinău where ranked 52nd place. In 1998, she won silver medal behind the Chinese chess player Wang Yu in World Youth Chess Championship in the U16 girl's age group. In 2000, Cristina Moshina represented the Moldovan team in European Girls' U18 Team Chess Championship, where she won team bronze and individual silver medals.

In 2000, she was awarded the FIDE Woman International Master (WIM) title. Since 2003 she has stopped played in chess tournaments.
