= Anna Kochukova =

Russian chess player

Personal information
- Born: 2 December 2001 (age 24)

Chess career
- Country: Russia
- Title: Woman FIDE Master (2015)
- Peak rating: 2275 (February 2019)

Anna Kochukova (Russian: Анна Евгеньевна Кочукова; born 2 December 2001) is a Russian chess Woman FIDE Master (2015).

== Biography ==
Anna Kochukova was a student of Borisoglebsk Chess School. She has represented Russia at European Youth Chess Championships and World Youth Chess Championships. In 2015, in Poreč Anna Kochukova won European Youth Chess Championship in the U14 girls age group and became the Woman FIDE Master (WFM). In 2017, she won Russian Youth Chess Championship in the U17 girls age group.
