= Mamikon Gharibyan =

Armenian chess grandmaster (born 2004)

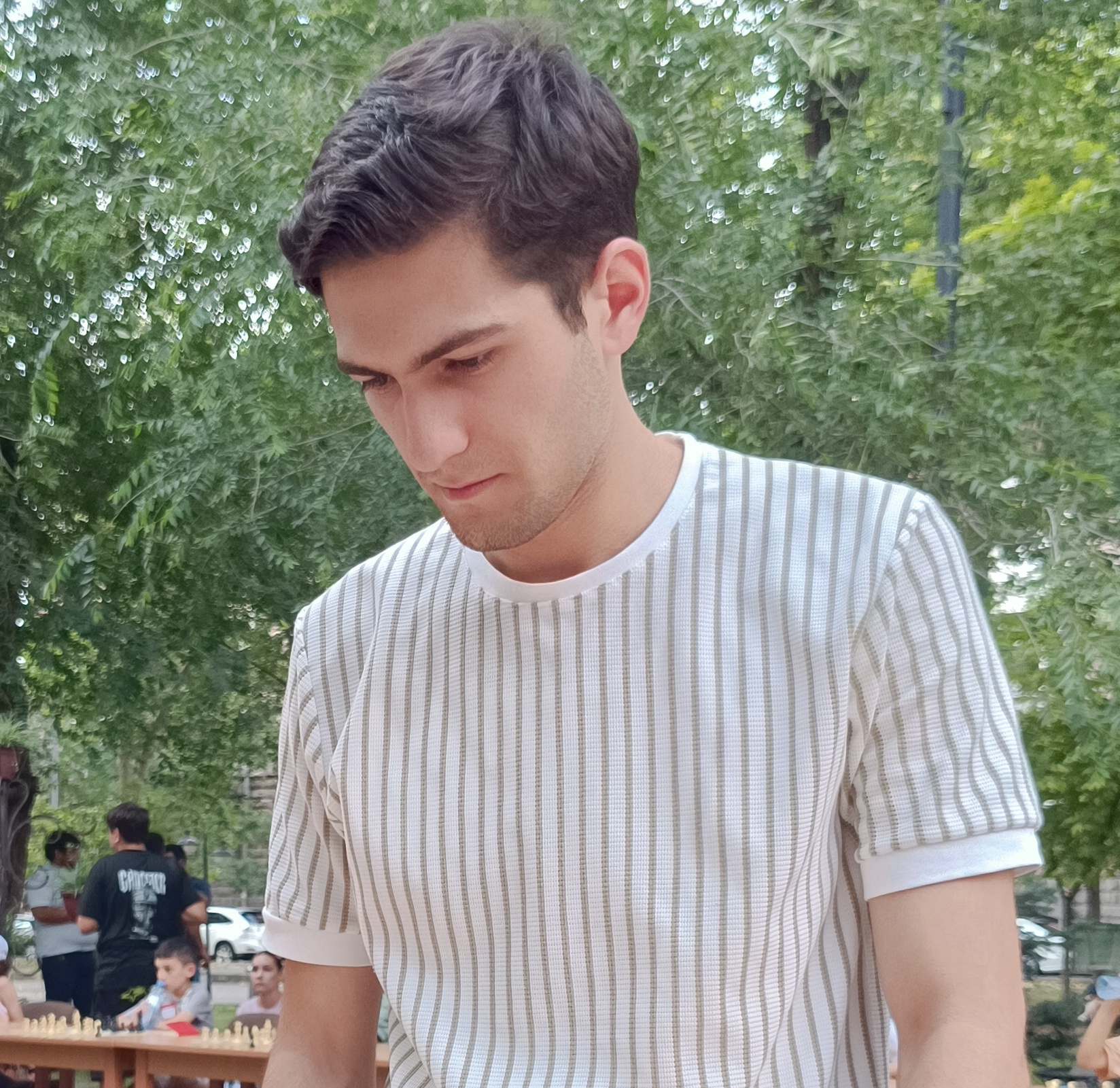

Personal information
- Born: September 21, 2004 (age 21) Gyumri, Armenia

Chess career
- Country: Armenia
- Title: Grandmaster (2023)
- FIDE rating: 2485 (July 2026)
- Peak rating: 2508 (February 2024)

Mamikon Gharibyan (Armenian: Մամիկոն Ղարիբյան; born 21 September 2004) is an Armenian chess grandmaster.

== Biography ==
Mamikon Gharibyan started playing chess at the age of six. In 2012, he won the Armenian Youth Chess Championship in the U08 age group, but in 2014 Mamikon Gharibyan was best in the U10 age group. In 2013, he won the international youth chess tournament Nona Gaprindashvili cup.

Mamikon Gharibyan repeatedly represented Armenia at the European Youth Chess Championships and World Youth Chess Championships in different age groups, where he won two gold medals: in 2014, in Batumi at the European Youth Chess Championship in the U10 age group, and in 2016, in Prague at the European Youth Chess Championship in the U12 age group.

Gharibyan earned the grandmaster title in 2023.
