= Aleksandra Dimitrova =

Russian chess player

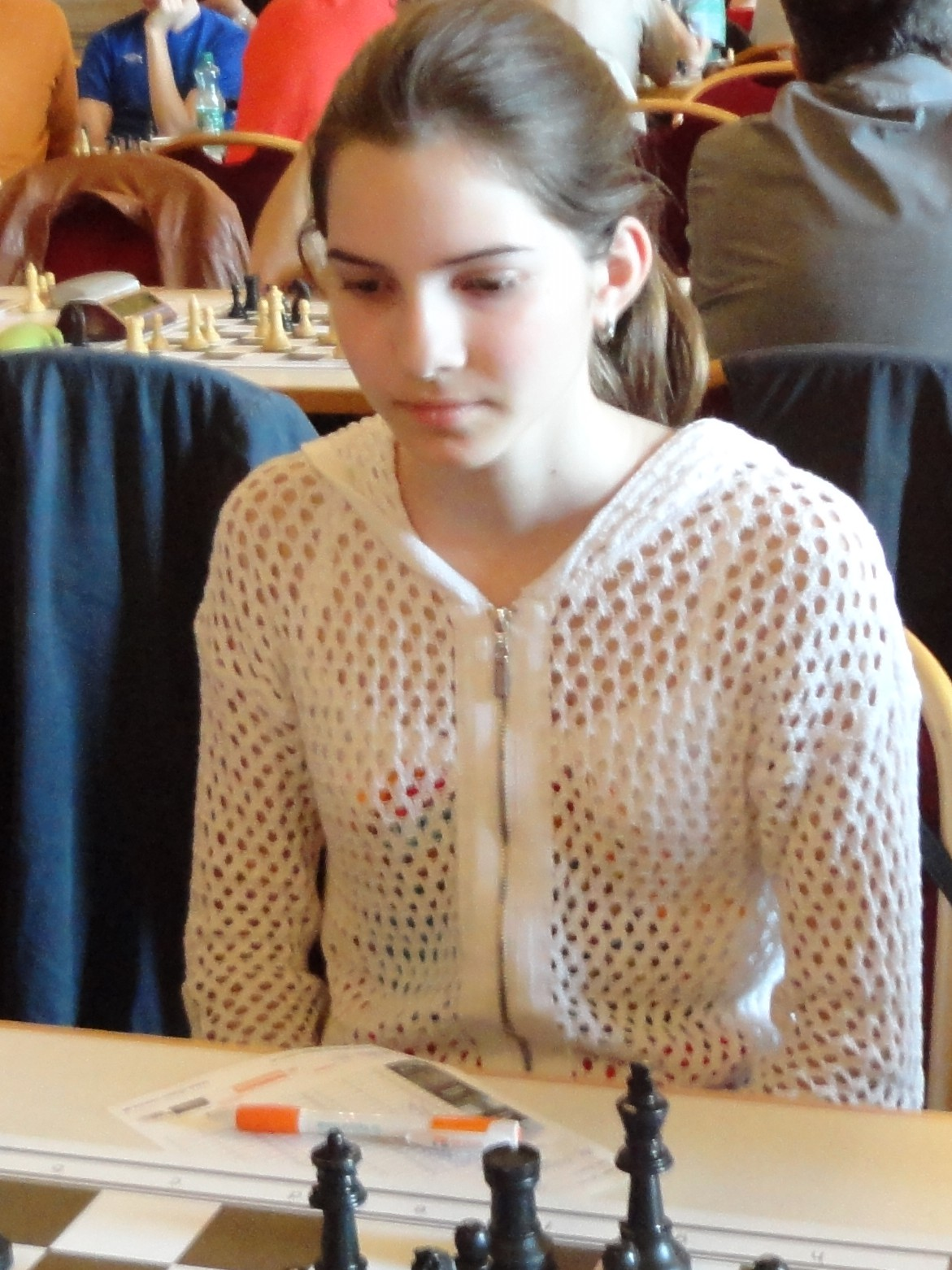
- Dimitrova in Wien, 2015

Personal information
- Full name: Aleksandra Nikolaevna Dimitrova
- Born: 15 December 2000 (age 25)

Chess career
- Country: Russia (until 2023); FIDE (since 2023)
- Title: Woman International Master (2017)
- Peak rating: 2319 (November 2016)

Aleksandra Nikolaevna Dimitrova (Russian: Александра Николаевна Димитрова; born 15 December 2000) is a Russian chess player who holds the FIDE title of Woman International Master (WIM, 2017).

== Biography ==
Aleksandra Dimitrova was Kostroma Oblast chess school schoolgirl, later she moved to Moscow. In 2017, Dimitrova won 3rd place in Moscow Women's Chess Championship. In August 2017, in the "Riga Technical University Open" "A" tournament she has completed the Woman International Master norm. In 2017, she was awarded the FIDE Woman International Master (WIM) title. In 2018, Aleksandra Dimitrova won the Russian Youth Chess Championship in the U19 girls age group.

Dimitrova repeatedly represented Russia at the European Youth Chess Championships and World Youth Chess Championships in different age groups. In 2017, she won World Schools Chess Championship in the U17 girls age group. In August 2018, in Riga she won European Youth Chess Championship in the U18 girls age group.
