= Katarzyna Adamowicz =

Polish chess player (born 1993)

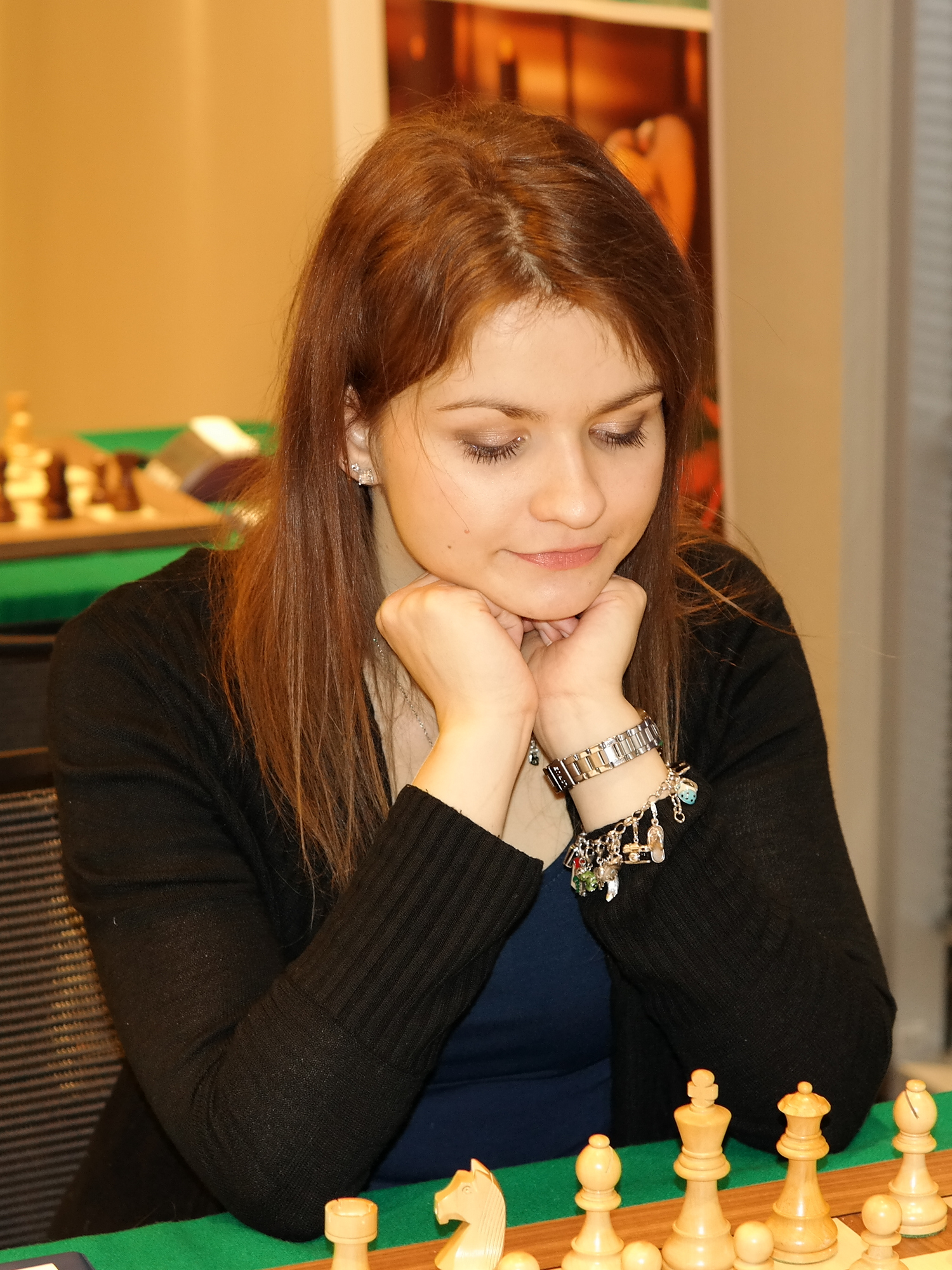
- Katarzyna Adamowicz in 2014

Personal information
- Born: 7 January 1993 (age 33) Koszalin, Poland

Chess career
- Country: Poland
- Title: Woman FIDE Master (2009)
- Peak rating: 2194 (October 2014)

Katarzyna Adamowicz (born 7 January 1993) is a Polish chess player who holds the title of Woman FIDE Master (WFM) (2009).

== Biography ==
Katarzyna Adamowicz many times participated in the Polish Youth Chess Championships in different girls' age groups, where she won six medals: two gold (2005 - U12, 2007 - U14), three silver (2006 - U14, 2009 - U16, 2011 - U18) and bronze (2007 - U20). With chess club Hetman-Politechnika Koszalińska, she twice won the Polish Team's Blitz Chess Championships (2007, 2009).

Katarzyna Adamowicz repeatedly represented Poland at the European Youth Chess Championships and World Youth Chess Championships in different age groups, where she won a gold medal in 2009, at the European Youth Chess Championship in the U16 girls age group. She three times participated in the European Girls' U18 Team Chess Championships (2009-2011), where she won two gold (2009, 2010) medals in team scoring, as well as a silver (2010) medal in individual scoring.
