= Ayan Allahverdiyeva =

Azerbaijani chess player (born 2005)

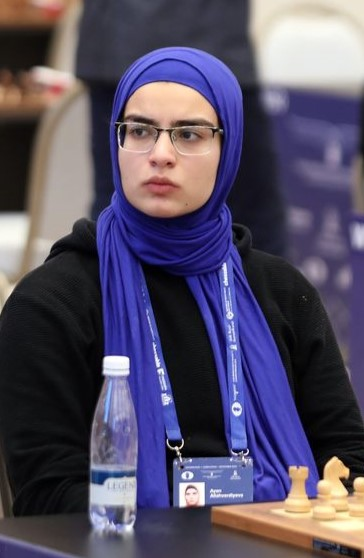
- Ayan Allahverdiyeva in 2023

Personal information
- Born: February 21, 2005 (age 21)

Chess career
- Country: Azerbaijan
- Title: Woman International Master (2024)
- Peak rating: 2316 (April 2025)

Ayan Allahverdiyeva (born 21 February 2005) is an Azerbaijani chess player and 2018 European Youth Chess Championship winner.

== Biography ==
In 2013 she won the Azerbaijan Youth Chess Championship for girls U8. In 2014 and 2015 Allahverdiyeva won the Azerbaijani Youth Chess Championship for girls in the U10 age group, and in 2016 and 2017 repeated this success in the girls' U12 age group. In 2018, Allahverdiyeva won the sixth consecutive title in the Azerbaijani Youth Chess Championship – this time in the U14 age group of girls. In the same year, she also participated in the Azerbaijani Junior Chess Championships for girls in the U20 age group and won a bronze medal. In 2017, she made her debut in the Azerbaijani Women's Chess Championship final, taking 15th place.

Allahverdiyeva repeatedly represented Azerbaijan at the European Youth Chess Championships and World Youth Chess Championships in different age groups. In 2015, she won the silver medal in the European Youth Chess Championship in the U10 girls age group. In 2017, she won the bronze medal in the European Youth Chess Championship in the U12 girls age group. In 2018, in Riga Allahverdiyeva won the European Youth Chess Championship in the U14 girls age group. In 2019 in Bratislava, she won the European Youth Chess Championship in the U14 girls age group.

Allahverdiyeva played for the Azerbaijan-3 team in the Women's Chess Olympiad:

- In 2016, at fourth board in the 42nd Chess Olympiad (women) in Baku (+4, =1, -1).
