= Kamaliya Bulatova =

Russian chess player (born 2003)

Personal information
- Born: 23 January 2003 (age 23)

Chess career
- Country: Russia
- Title: Woman FIDE Master (2017)
- Peak rating: 2245 (August 2019)

Kamaliya Bulatova (Russian: Камалия Булатова; born 23 January 2003) is a Russian chess player who holds the FIDE title of Woman FIDE Master (WFM).

== Biography ==
Kamaliya Bulatova was a student of Tatarstan Chess School. In 2015, she won the Zelenodolsk city men's chess championship. In 2016, Kamaliya Bulatova won Republic of Tatarstan Women's Chess Championship. In 2015, she ranked 2nd in Russian Youth Chess Championship in the U15 girls age group, but after year won this tournament.

Bulatova has repeatedly represented Russia at European Youth Chess Championships and World Youth Chess Championships. In 2012, in Iași she won the silver medal in the World School Chess Championship in the U08 girls age group. In 2018 August in Riga she won European Youth Chess Championship 2018 in the U16 girls age group.

== FIDE ratings ==
Elo development
View chart definition.
