= Malak Ismayil =

Azerbaijani chess player (born 2004)

Personal information
- Born: 9 January 2004 (age 22)

Chess career
- Country: Azerbaijan
- Title: Woman International Master (2025)
- Peak rating: 2200 (January 2024)

Malak Ismayil (born 9 January 2004) is an Azerbaijani chess player who holds the FIDE title of Woman FIDE Master (WFM). In 2014, she was a winner at the European Youth Chess Championships in the girls U10 age group.

== Biography ==
Malak Ismayil is Sumqayit chess school student. She repeatedly represented Azerbaijan at the European Youth Chess Championships and World Youth Chess Championships in different age groups. In 2014, in Batumi Malak Ismayil won European Youth Chess Championship in the U10 girls age group. In 2012, she ranked 9th in World Youth Chess Championship in the U08 girls age group. In 2013, Malak Ismayil ranked 4th in World School Chess Championship in the U09 girls age group.
