= Maria Severina =

Russian chess player

Personal information
- Full name: Maria Ruslanovna Severina
- Born: 21 November 1995 (age 30)

Chess career
- Country: Russia (until 2023); Serbia (since 2023)
- Title: Woman International Master (2013)
- FIDE rating: 2202 (June 2021)
- Peak rating: 2330 (January 2016)

Maria Ruslanovna Severina (Russian: Мария Руслановна Северина; born 21 November 1995) is a Russian chess player. She received the FIDE title of Woman International Master (WIM) in 2013.

== Biography ==
Maria Severina learned to play chess at the age of four. She has received prizes in the Russian Youth Chess Championships. In 2015, Maria Severina won third place in the Russian Junior Chess Championship in the U21 girls age group.

In the 2000s, Severina repeatedly represented Russia at the European Youth Chess Championships and World Youth Chess Championships in different age groups, where she won two medals: gold (in 2011, at the European Youth Chess Championship in the U16 girls age group) and bronze (in 2012, at the World Youth Chess Championship in the U18 girls age group). In 2013, she won World Youth Blitz Championship in the U18 girls age group.

In 2013, she was awarded the FIDE Woman International Master (WIM) title. In 2016, Maria Severina was awarded the Russia Master of Sport title.

In 2017, in Moscow, Severina graduated from National Research University – Higher School of Economics.
