= Anna Dorofeeva =

Russian chess player

Personal information
- Full name: Anna Gennadievna Dorofeeva
- Born: 15 February 1979 (age 47) Kirov, Russia

Chess career
- Country: Russia
- Title: Woman International Master (1998)
- Peak rating: 2360 (July 1998)

Anna Gennadievna Dorofeeva (Russian: Анна Геннадьевна Дорофеева; born 15 February 1979) is a Russian chess player who holds the FIDE title of Woman International Master (WIM, 1998).

== Biography ==
Anna Dorofeeva started playing chess in the third class of primary school. She is multiple winner of women's chess championships in Kirov and Kirov Oblast as well as Russian Youth Chess Championships. In 1997, in Tallinn, Dorofeeva won European Youth Chess Championship in the U18 girls age group. In 1998, she was awarded the FIDE Woman International Master (WIM) title.

Dorofeeva played for Russia "B" team in the Women's Chess Olympiad:

- In 1998, at first board in the 33rd Chess Olympiad (women) in Elista (+2, =5, -3).

In 1996, Dorofeeva joined the Russian State University of Physical Education, Sport, Youth and Tourism which one graduated in 2002. Since 2002, she has been working as a trainer of young chess players. She is an author of several children's chess books.

Since 2007, she rarely participated in the chess tournaments.
