= Marc Erwich =

Dutch chess player

Personal information
- Born: 18 August 1986 (age 39)

Chess career
- Country: Netherlands
- Title: International Master (2007)
- Peak rating: 2425 (May 2012)

Marc Erwich (born 18 August 1986) is a Dutch journalist and chess player who holds the FIDE title of International Master (IM).

== Biography ==
Marc Erwich played for Netherlands in European Youth Chess Championships and World Youth Chess Championships in the different age groups and best result reached in 2000 in Kallithea, when he won European Youth Chess Championship in the U14 age group. In 2007, he was awarded the FIDE International Master (IM) title.

Of his 260 total games he has 94 wins (36.2%), 78 losses (30%) and 88 draws (33.8%).

He has played using the white pieces a total of 127 times. His results are 47 wins (37%), 37 losses (29.1%) and 43 draws (33.9%). In these games his most common opening was the Sicilian Defense.

Of his 133 games playing black, he has 47 wins (35.3%), 41 losses (30.8%) and 45 draws (33.8%). When playing black his most common opening was the Scotch Game.

Erwich graduated from Utrecht University and Leiden University and works as freelance journalist.
