= Evgenios Ioannidis =

Greek chess grandmaster (born 2001)

Personal information
- Born: 12 January 2001 (age 25)

Chess career
- Country: Greece
- Title: Grandmaster (2023)
- FIDE rating: 2468 (October 2026)
- Peak rating: 2521 (March 2024)

Evgenios Ioannidis (Greek: Ευγένιος Ιωαννίδης; born 12 January 2001) is a Greek chess grandmaster. He won the Greek Chess Championship in 2026.

== Biography ==
Evgenios Ioannidis is multiple Greek Youth Chess Championships in different age groups (U08, U10). Evgenios Ioannidis repeatedly represented Greece at the European Youth Chess Championships and World Youth Chess Championships in different age groups, where he won two gold medals: in 2011, at the European Youth Chess Championship in the U10 age group, and in 2018, at the European Youth Chess Championship in the U18 age group. In 2010, he won European School Chess Championship in the U11 age group. In 2016, he played for Greece in World Youth U16 Chess Olympiad. In 2017, in Uppsala he won the international youth chess tournament.

Ioannidis was awarded the FIDE International Master (IM) title in 2018 and the grandmaster title in 2023.
