= Gil Popilski =

Israeli chess grandmaster (born 1993)

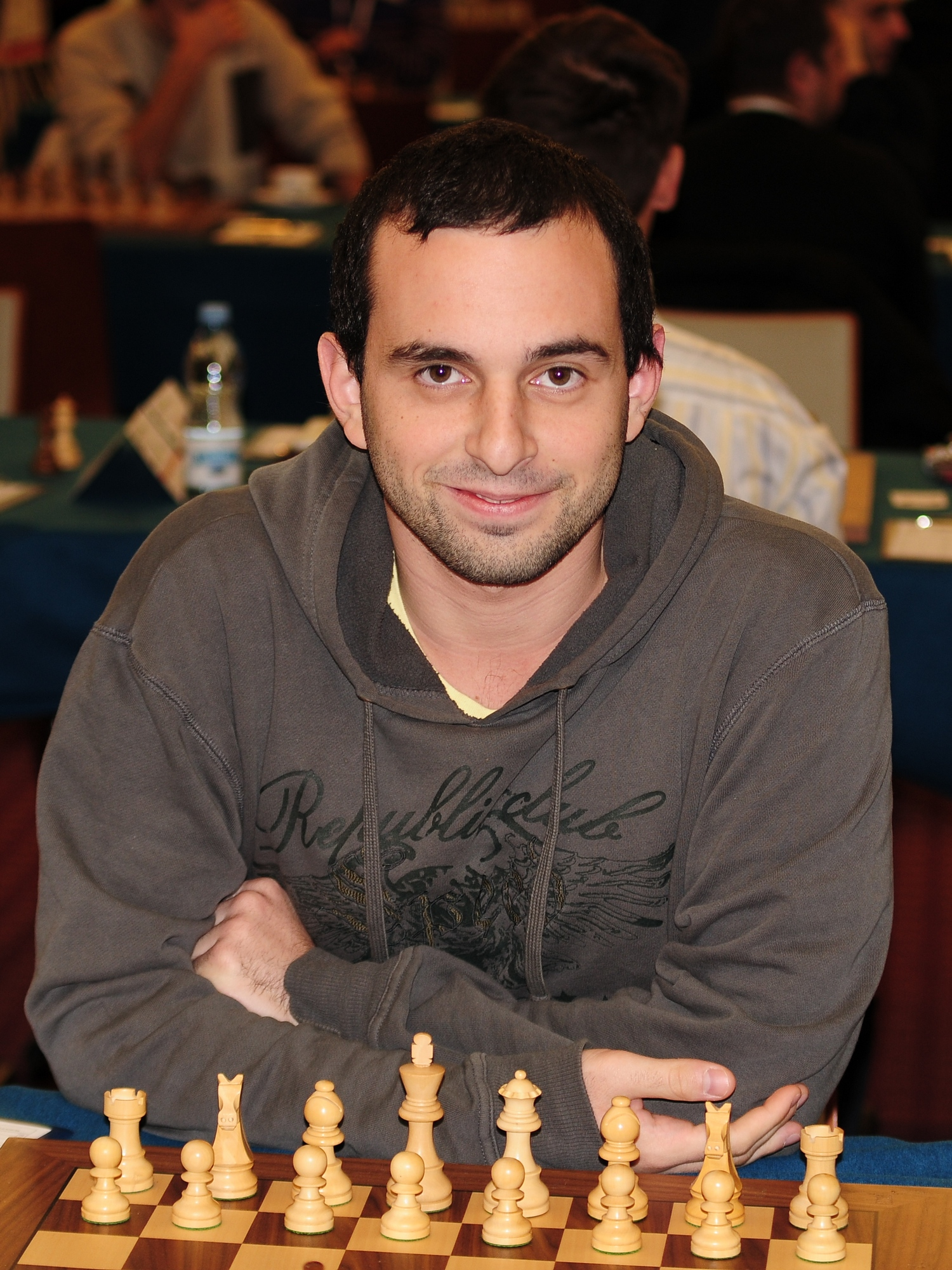
- Gil Popilski in 2013

Personal information
- Native name: גיל פופילסקי
- Born: 6 October 1993 (age 32) Israel

Chess career
- Country: Israel
- Title: Grandmaster (2013)
- Peak rating: 2572 (December 2015)

Gil Popilski (Hebrew: גיל פופילסקי; born 6 October 1993) is an Israeli chess Grandmaster (2013).

== Biography ==
Gil Popilski repeatedly represented Israel at the European Youth Chess Championships and World Youth Chess Championships in different age groups, where he won two medals: gold (in 2009, at the European Youth Chess Championship in the U16 age group) and bronze (in 2007, at the European Youth Chess Championship in the U14 age group). In 2011, in Tel Aviv he won Israeli Junior Chess Championship in U20 age group.

In 2008, Gil Popilski won international chess tournament in Petah Tikva. In 2009, in Ashdod he shared 2nd place in international chess tournament behind winner Ilya Smirin. In 2010, in Enschede Gil Popilski shared 3rd place in international chess tournament with Robin van Kampen and Martyn Kravtsiv.

Gil Popilski played for Israel in the European Team Chess Championship:

- In 2013, at second board in the 19th European Team Chess Championship in Warsaw (+2, =3, -3).

In 2010, he was awarded the FIDE International Master (IM) title and received the FIDE Grandmaster (GM) title three year later. His best rating was 2572 in December 2015.
