= Adrien Leroy =

French chess player

Personal information
- Born: 2 January 1981 (age 45) Paris, France

Chess career
- Country: France
- Title: FIDE Master (1991)
- FIDE rating: 2239 (July 2008)
- Peak rating: 2345 (July 1993)

Adrien Leroy (born 2 January 1981) is a French poet and chess player. He received the FIDE title of FIDE Master (FM) in 1991.

== Biography ==
In 1991, in Mamaia, Adrien Leroy won inaugural European Youth Chess Championship in the U10 age group. In this same year in Warsaw, he also won World Youth Chess Championship in the U10 age group. Adrien Leroy has been awarded the FIDE Master title for this success. He was also the winner of the French Chess Championships in this age group.

In 1996, Adrien Leroy left the chess career and seriously turned to poetry. He has published several poetry books. In his poetry, Adrien Leroy try to reflect the feelings of the adolescent world and writing about the young person's contact with the world around him.

== Works ==
- Adrien Leroy. Cendre de nuit (éd. Librairie-Galerie Racine, 2000).
- Adrien Leroy. Trame de flèches noires (éd. Librairie-Galerie Racine, 2003).
- Adrien Leroy. Là où je prends feu (Jacques André éditeur, 2011).
- Adrien Leroy. Cicatrices dans les souvenirs de l'aube (Harmattan, 2018).
