= Aliaksei Charnushevich =

French chess grandmaster (born 1978)

Personal information
- Full name: Aliaksei Alexandrovich Charnushevich
- Born: 18 December 1978 (age 47) Lida, Byelorussian SSR, Soviet Union

Chess career
- Country: Belarus (until 2003); France (since 2003)
- Title: Grandmaster (2012)
- FIDE rating: 2452 (July 2026)
- Peak rating: 2537 (January 2008)

Aliaksei Alexandrovich Charnushevich (Belarusian: Аляксей Аляксандравіч Чарнушэвіч; Russian: Алексей Александрович Чернушевич; born 18 December 1978) is a Belarusian and French chess player who received the FIDE title of Grandmaster (GM) in September 2012.

== Biography ==
Aliaksei Charnushevich is Grodno chess school student. In 1994, in Băile Herculane he won European Youth Chess Championship in the U16 age group.

Since the early 2000s Aliaksei Charnushevich has moved to France. He has regularly participated in French individual and team chess championships.

In 1998, he was awarded the FIDE International Master (IM) title and received the FIDE Grandmaster (GM) title in 2012.
