= Arseny Shurunov =

Russian chess player

Personal information
- Born: 26 May 1996 (age 30)

Chess career
- Country: Russia
- Title: FIDE Master (2006)
- Peak rating: 2285 (May 2014)

Arseny Shurunov (Russian: Арсений Сергеевич Шурунов; born 26 May 1996) is a Russian chess player who holds the title of FIDE Master (FM) (2006).

== Biography ==
Arseny Shurunov is a student of the Chelyabinsk chess school. He played for Russia in European Youth Chess Championships and World Youth Chess Championships in various age groups, achieving his best result in 2006 in Herceg Novi, where he won the European Youth Chess Championship in the U10 age group. For this success he was awarded the title of FIDE Master (FM). In 2008, Arseny Shurunov won the European Youth Rapid Chess Championship in the U12 age group.
