= Konstantin Nikologorskiy =

Russian chess player (born 1995)

Personal information
- Born: 6 August 1995 (age 31) Vladimir Oblast, Russia

Chess career
- Country: Russia
- Title: International Master (2017)
- FIDE rating: 2413 (October 2026)
- Peak rating: 2416 (September 2016)

Konstantin Nikologorskiy (Russian: Константин Сергеевич Никологорский; born 6 August 1995) is a Russian chess player who holds the title of International Master (IM).

== Biography ==
Konstantin Nikologorskiy was born in Nikologor village of Vyazniki District of Vladimir Oblast. He is multiple Russian Youth Chess Championship participant in different age groups with two wins: in 2003 in U8 age group and in 2004 in U10 age group. He played for Russia in European Youth Chess Championships and World Youth Chess Championships in the different age groups and best result reached in 2005 in Herceg Novi, when he won European Youth Chess Championship in the U10 age group. About this success he became FIDE Master (FM) title. In 2007, Konstantin Nikologorskiy won World School Chess Championship in the U13 age group. In 2011, he played for Russia team in World Youth U16 Chess Olympiad and won team and individual gold medals.

In 2017, he was awarded the FIDE International Master (IM) title.

Now Konstantin Nikologorskiy works as a chess trainer in Moscow and Moscow Oblast.
