= Alina Tarachowicz =

Polish chess player

Personal information
- Born: 21 August 1981 (age 44) Słupsk, Poland

Chess career
- Country: Poland
- Title: Woman FIDE Master (1992)
- Peak rating: 2105 (January 1996)

Alina Tarachowicz (born 21 August 1981) is a Polish chess player who holds the title of Woman FIDE Master (WFM) (1992).

== Biography ==
In the 1990s, Alina Tarachowicz participated many times in the Polish Youth Chess Championships in different girls' age groups, where she won five medals: two gold (1993 - U12, 1997 - U16) and three silver (1991 - U10, 1992 - U12, 1995 - U14).

Alina Tarachowicz repeatedly represented Poland at the European Youth Chess Championships and World Youth Chess Championships in different age groups, where she won two medals: gold (in 1992, at the European Youth Chess Championship in the U12 girls age group) and bronze (in 1995, at the European Youth Chess Championship in the U14 girls age group).

Since 2000 she has not participated in chess tournaments.
