= Karl Mah =

English chess player

Personal information
- Born: 14 December 1980 (age 45)

Chess career
- Country: England
- Title: International Master (1999)
- FIDE rating: 2411 (July 2026)
- Peak rating: 2428 (July 2010)

Karl CC Mah (born 14 December 1980) is an English chess player who holds the title of FIDE International Master (IM) (1999).

== Biography ==
Mah is two-times winner the British Youth Chess Championship: in 1990 in U09 age group, and in 1991 in U10 age group. In 1993 and 1994 he was an Essex County Youth Chess Champion in the U18 age group. He played for England in European Youth Chess Championships and World Youth Chess Championships in the different age groups. Best result - in 1994, in Băile Herculane Karl Mah won European Youth Chess Championship in the U14 age group. In 1999, he awarded the FIDE International Master (IM) title.

Mah is a partner in the London office of Latham & Watkins and is the Chair of the London Tax Department.
