= Lara Stock =

Croatian chess player (born 1992)

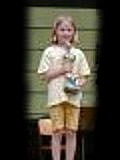

Personal information
- Born: 26 May 1992 (age 34) Freiburg, Germany

Chess career
- Country: Croatia
- Title: Woman Grandmaster (2008)
- Peak rating: 2346 (January 2008)

Lara Stock (born 26 May 1992 in Freiburg, Germany) is a Croatian chess player who holds the FIDE title of Woman Grandmaster (WGM). She won the World Youth Chess Championship in the girls under-10 section in 2002 and the European Youth Chess Championship in the girls under-12 division in 2004. Stock played for Croatia in the Women's Chess Olympiad of 2006.

She achieved her third and final norm required for the WGM title at the 2007 Trieste Open.

She lives in Freiburg. Her mother is Croatian, her father is German.

Her chess coach was Ognjen Cvitan.

In 2011, Stock and her father generated controversy by using false names to win the Hamilton Rookies Shield, an amateur tournament in Hamilton, New Zealand, and compete in other tournaments in the Australian circuit.
