= Kağan Aydın Çelebi =

Turkish chess player (born 2003)

Kağan Aydınçelebi
Personal information
- Born: March 9, 2003 (age 23) Gebze, Türkiye

Chess career
- Country: Turkey
- Title: FIDE Master (2014)
- Peak rating: 2326 (September 2025)

Kağan Aydınçelebi (born 2003) is a Turkish FIDE Master.

== Biography ==
Kağan Aydın Çelebi repeatedly represented Turkey at the European Youth Chess Championships and World Youth Chess Championships in different age groups. In 2013, in Budva he won the European Youth Chess Championship in the U10 age group. In 2012, Kağan Aydın Çelebi won a bronze medal in the European School Chess Championship in the U09 age group. In 2014, he won a silver medal in the European School Chess Championship in the U11 age group.

In 2012, Kağan Aydınçelebi played for Turkey's team C at the second board in the 40th Chess Olympiad in Istanbul (where Turkey, as the host country, had three teams); his results were (+2, =2, -5).
