= Tamara Chistiakova =

Russian chess player

Personal information
- Born: 15 February 1986 (age 40)

Chess career
- Country: Russia
- Title: Woman FIDE Master (2000)
- FIDE rating: 2285 (July 2013)
- Peak rating: 2366 (January 2008)

Tamara Chistiakova (Russian: Тамара Евгеньевна Чистякова; born 15 February 1986) is a Russian Woman FIDE Master (WFM) (2000).

== Biography ==
Tamara Chistiakova was Kazan chess school schoolgirl. She repeatedly represented Russia at the European Youth Chess Championships and World Youth Chess Championships in different age groups, where she won six medals: two gold (in 2000, at the European Youth Chess Championship in the U14 girls age group, and in 2002, at the World Youth Chess Championship in the U16 girls age group), two silver (in 1996, at the European Youth Chess Championship in the U10 girls age group, and in 1998, at the European Youth Chess Championship in the U14 girls age group) and two bronze (in 1996, at the World Youth Chess Championship in the U10 girls age group, and in 1997, at the European Youth Chess Championship in the U12 girls age group).

In 2003, in Serpukhov Tamara Chistiakova won Russian Women's Chess Championship 1st League Tournament. In 2004 Istanbul won a bronze medal at the World Student Chess Championship behind Evgenija Ovod and Joanna Dworakowska. In 2006, she again won the Russian Women's Chess Championship 1st League Tournament, as well as shared 2nd place in Elisaveta Bykova Memorial Chess Tournament in Vladimir.
