= Vladislava Kalinina =

Ukrainian chess player (born 1980)

Personal information
- Born: 25 February 1980 (age 46) Kharkiv, Ukrainian SSR, Soviet Union

Chess career
- Country: Ukraine
- Title: Woman International Master (1999)
- FIDE rating: 2255 (July 2005)
- Peak rating: 2335 (July 2002)

Vladislava Kalinina (Ukrainian: Владислава Калініна; born 25 February 1980) is a Ukrainian chess player who holds the FIDE title of Woman International Master (WIM, 1999).

== Biography ==
Vladislava Kalinina was a Kharkiv chess school schoolgirl. She repeatedly represented Ukraine at the European Youth Chess Championships and World Youth Chess Championships in different age groups, where she has been the most successful in Rimavská Sobota in 1996, when she won the European Youth Chess Championship for girls in the U16 age group. In 1998, in Bucharest Vladislava Kalinina was second behind Anna Zatonskih in the International Women's Chess Tournament. In 1999, in European Women's Chess Club Cup she won the third place with the Grandmaster School Kyiv team.

In 1999, she received the FIDE Woman International Master (WIM) title.

Since 2005, Kalinina rarely participates in chess tournaments.
