= Stefan Pogosyan =

Russian-Armenian chess player (born 2004)

Personal information
- Born: 17 February 2004 (age 22) Moscow, Russia

Chess career
- Country: Russia (until 2023); Armenia (since 2023)
- Title: International Master (2018)
- Peak rating: 2477 (January 2020)

Stefan Pogosyan (Russian: Стефан Погосян; born 17 February 2004) is a Russian chess International Master who represents Armenia.

== Biography ==
Stefan Pogosyan is Moscow chess school "Orient" student. In 2015, he won the Moscow Youth Chess Championship in the U13 age group. In 2016, Stefan Pogosyan won the silver medal in Russia Youth Chess Championship in the U13 age group, but in 2017, he won bronze in Russia Youth Chess Championship in the U15 age group.

Stefan Pogosyan represented Russia at the European Youth Chess Championships, World Youth Under 16 Chess Olympiad 2018 and World Youth Chess Championships in different age groups, where he won gold medal in 2018 in Riga at the European Youth Chess Championship in the U14 age group, silver medal in individual category on the 3-rd board at the World Youth Chess Olympiad in Konya and bronze medal in 2019 in Bratislava at the European Youth Chess Championship in the U16 age group. In 2018, he won chess festival "Riga Technical University Open" blitz tournament "F Midweek blitz". In October 2019, he won silver medal in World Youth Chess Championship in O16 age group.

In 2018, Stefan Pogosyan received the FIDE title of International Master.
