= Anna Vasenina =

Russian chess player (born 1999)

Personal information
- Born: 19 February 1999 (age 27)

Chess career
- Country: Russia
- Title: Woman FIDE Master (2009)
- FIDE rating: 1996 (May 2016)
- Peak rating: 2146 (September 2014)

Anna Vasenina (Russian: Анна Васенина; born 19 September 1999) is a Russian chess player who holds the FIDE title of Woman FIDE Master (WFM, 2009).

== Biography ==
In 2007, Anna Vasenina won Russia Girl's Chess Championship in the U08 age group. In 2009, in Varna she won International Youth Chess tournament The Hopes of the World. Anna Vasenina played for Russia in European Youth Chess Championships and World Youth Chess Championships. In 2009, she won the European Youth Chess Championship for girls in the U10 age group and became a Women FIDE Master (WFM). In 2011, she won the European Youth Chess Championship for girls in the U12 age group. In 2011, she won silver medal in World Youth Chess Championship for girls in the U12 age group, but in 2013 she won bronze medal in World Youth Chess Championship for girls in the U14 age group. In 2013, Anna Vasenina won Moscow Girl's Blitz Chess Championship.
