= Sabina Sariteanu =

Romanian chess player

Personal information
- Born: 26 June 1981 (age 45)

Chess career
- Country: Romania
- Title: Woman FIDE Master (1991)
- Peak rating: 2062 (July 1999)

Sabina Sariteanu (born 26 June 1981), née Popescu, is a Romanian chess player who holds the title of Woman FIDE Master (WFM) (2006).

== Biography ==
Sabina Sariteanu repeatedly represented Romania at the European Youth Chess Championships and World Youth Chess Championships in different age groups, where she won gold medal in 1991, at the first European Youth Chess Championship in the U10 girls age group. She won two gold (1991, 1999) and bronze (1995) medals in Romanian Youth Chess Championships in different girl's age groups. In 1997, in Visegrád Sabina Sariteanu won the International Women's Chess Tournament, and the following year in Tapolca she won 3rd place in the International Women's Chess Tournament. In 1998, Sabina Sariteanu won the Romanian Women's Team Chess Championship with BNR Bucharest chess club team. Sabina Sariteanu won bronze medal in 2024 at World Amateur Chess Championship in Rodos Island, Greece at category under the Women U2300 ELO
