= Silvia-Raluca Sgîrcea =

Romanian chess player

Personal information
- Born: 11 July 1989 (age 36) Drobeta-Turnu Severin, Romania

Chess career
- Country: Romania
- Title: Woman International Master (2011)
- Peak rating: 2302 (October 2014)

Silvia-Raluca Sgîrcea (born 11 July 1989) is a Romanian chess player. She received the FIDE title of Woman International Master (WIM) in 2011.

== Biography ==
Her father taught Silvia to play chess at the age of three. In 1999, she won the European Youth Chess Championship at the U10 age group of girls. In 2004, her family moved to Bucharest. In April 2005, she won the Progresul RATB Chess Cup in Bucharest. In July 2009, she shared third place in the Bulgarian Women's Chess Open Championship. In 2009 and 2012, she won the Romanian Women's Chess Blitz Championships. In 2012, she won second place in the Romanian Women's Chess Solving Championship.

In 2011, Silvia-Raluca Sgîrcea graduated from Bucharest Academy of Economic Studies Finance, Insurance, Banking and Stock Exchanges Faculty. She worked at the Romanian telecommunications company Romtelecom.
