= Leonid Sawlin =

German chess player (born 1999)

Personal information
- Born: 1999 (age 26–27)

Chess career
- Country: Germany
- Title: International Master (2021)
- FIDE rating: 2410 (July 2026)
- Peak rating: 2414 (November 2023)

Leonid Sawlin (born 1999) is a German chess International Master (2021).

== Biography ==
In 2013, Leonid Sawlin came second in the Maccabiah Games junior chess tournament. He has repeatedly represented Germany at European Youth Chess Championships and World Youth Chess Championships, winning the European Youth Chess Championship in 2015 in the U16 age group. He is currently playing for SK Zehlendorf.
