= Evgeni Kobylkin =

Ukrainian chess player

Personal information
- Born: 6 February 1982 (age 44)

Chess career
- Country: Ukraine
- Title: FIDE Master (2006)
- Peak rating: 2490 (January 2004)

Evgeni Kobylkin (Ukrainian: Євгеній Кобилкин; born 6 February 1982) is a Ukrainian chess player who holds the title of FIDE Master (FM) (2006).

== Biography ==
Evgeni Kobylkin is student of Luhansk chess school. He played for Ukraine in European Youth Chess Championships and World Youth Chess Championships in the different age groups and best result reached in 2006 in Rimavská Sobota, when he won European Youth Chess Championship in the U14 age group. About this success he became FIDE Master (FM) title. Evgeni Kobylkin two times has participated in Ukrainian Chess Championship final's (2000, 2003). He two-times won Ukrainian Team Chess Championship with Donetsk chess club Danko-Donbass (1997, 1999).
