= Ekaterina Goltseva =

Russian chess player (born 2002)

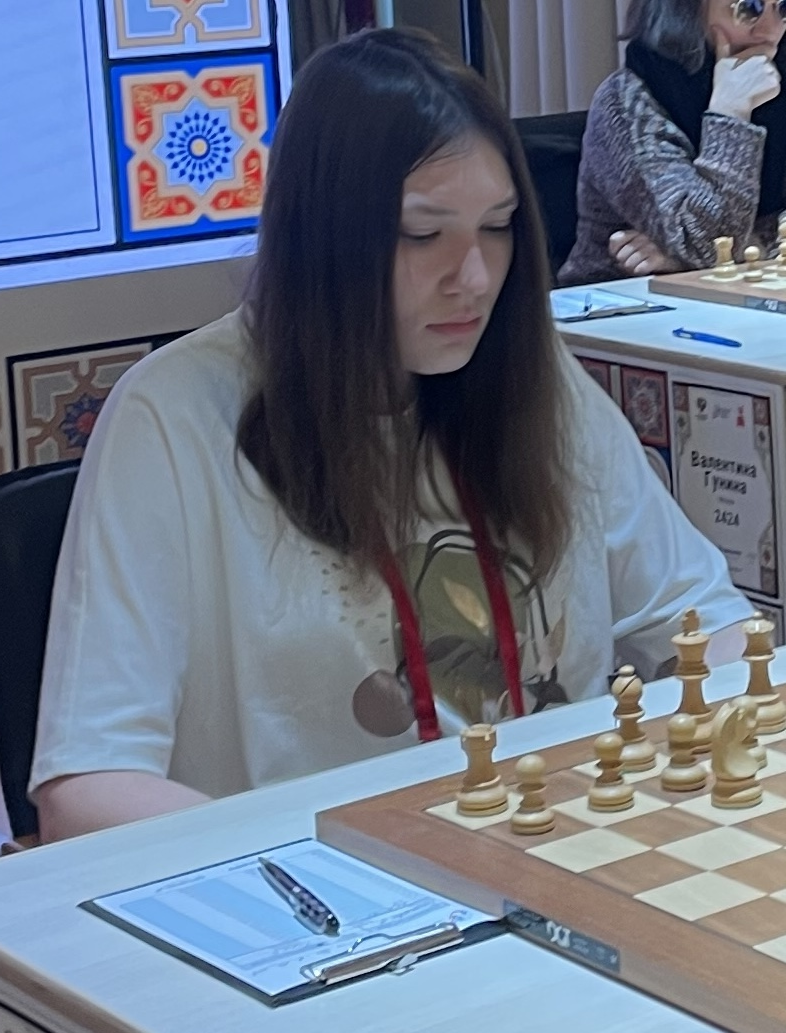

Personal information
- Born: 10 December 2002 (age 23)

Chess career
- Country: Russia
- Title: FIDE Master (2019); Woman Grandmaster (2025)
- Peak rating: 2393 (January 2025)

Ekaterina Goltseva (Russian: Екатерина Евгеньевна Гольцева; born 10 December 2002) is a Russian chess FIDE Master (2019).

== Biography ==
Ekaterina Goltseva was a student at Nizhny Novgorod Chess School. She has represented Russia at European Youth Chess Championships and World Youth Chess Championships. In 2014, in Batumi, she won the European Youth Chess Championship in the U12 girls age group and became Woman FIDE Master (WFM). Previously, Ekaterina Goltseva was twice European Youth Chess Vice-Champion: in 2010 in the U8 girls age group and in 2013 in the U12 girls age group. In 2017, she won silver medals in the Russian Youth Chess Championship in the U17 girls age group and Volga Federal District Women's Chess Championship. In 2019, Ekaterina Goltseva was awarded the FIDE Master (FM) title. In 2025 she was awarded the Woman Grandmaster (WGM) title.
