= Ivan Bukavshin =

Russian chess grandmaster (1995–2016)

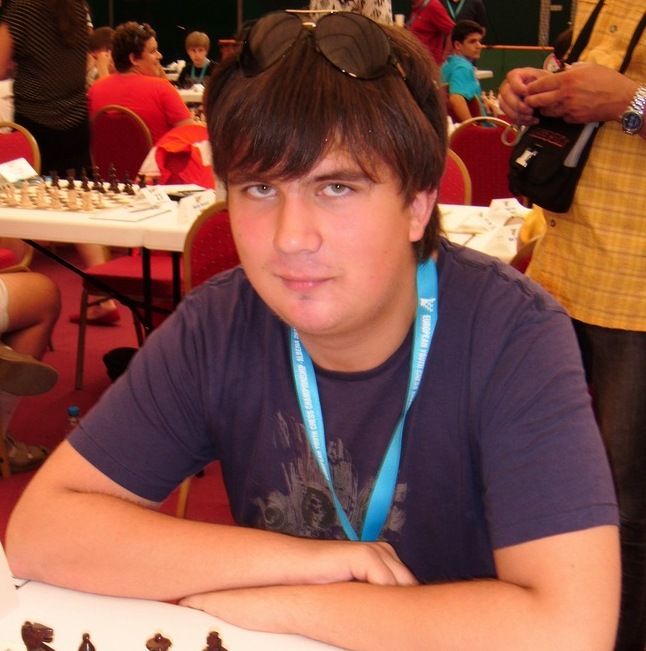
- Ivan Bukavshin at the 2011 European Youth Chess Championship in Albena

Personal information
- Born: Ivan Alexandrovich Bukavshin; 3 May 1995 Rostov-on-Don, Russia
- Died: 12 January 2016 (aged 20) Tolyatti, Russia

Chess career
- Country: Russia
- Title: Grandmaster (2011)
- Peak rating: 2658 (January 2016)
- Peak ranking: No. 91 (December 2015)

Ivan Alexandrovich Bukavshin (Иван Александрович Букавшин; 3 May 1995 – 12 January 2016) was a Russian chess player. He was awarded the title Grandmaster by FIDE in 2011. Bukavshin was three-time European champion in his age category.

== Chess career ==
Bukavshin won three gold medals at the European Youth Chess Championships, in the Under 12 section in 2006, the Under 14 in 2008 and the Under 16 in 2010.

In 2013, he tied for 1st–11th places with Pavel Eljanov, Dmitry Kokarev, Alexander Areshchenko, Denis Khismatullin, Oleg Korneev, Dragan Šolak, Vadim Zvjaginsev, Sanan Sjugirov, Maxim Matlakov and Ildar Khairullin in the Chigorin Memorial in Saint Petersburg. In the following year, he tied for first with Ivan Ivanišević in the same tournament, but placed second on tiebreak, after both players finished on a score of 7½/9 points. Bukavshin won the Russian Junior (Under 21) Championship in 2015.

In April 2015, he took clear third place at the Aeroflot Open in Moscow, behind Ian Nepomniachtchi and Daniil Dubov. Later that year, in July, Bukavshin tied for first with Vladislav Artemiev and Alexander Motylev, placing third on tiebreak, in the Russian Championship Higher League held in Kaliningrad and earned the qualification for the Superfinal of the Russian Chess Championship. In the latter he scored 5/11 points. At the Chess World Cup 2015, for which he qualified through the European Individual Chess Championship held in February–March of the same year, he was eliminated in the first round by Sergei Zhigalko after the rapid tiebreakers. In December 2015 in Khanty-Mansiysk, Bukavshin won first the 11th Ugra Governor's Cup, edging out Aleksandr Rakhmanov and Urii Eliseev on tiebreak, and then the Russian Cup knockout tournament, defeating Dmitry Kokarev in the final.

== Death ==
Bukavshin died in Tolyatti on 12 January 2016 and was originally thought to have suffered a stroke, but it was later reported that it was a massive overdose (or poisoning) of No-Spa that caused his death.
