= Sergei Zhigalko =

Belarusian chess grandmaster (born 1989)

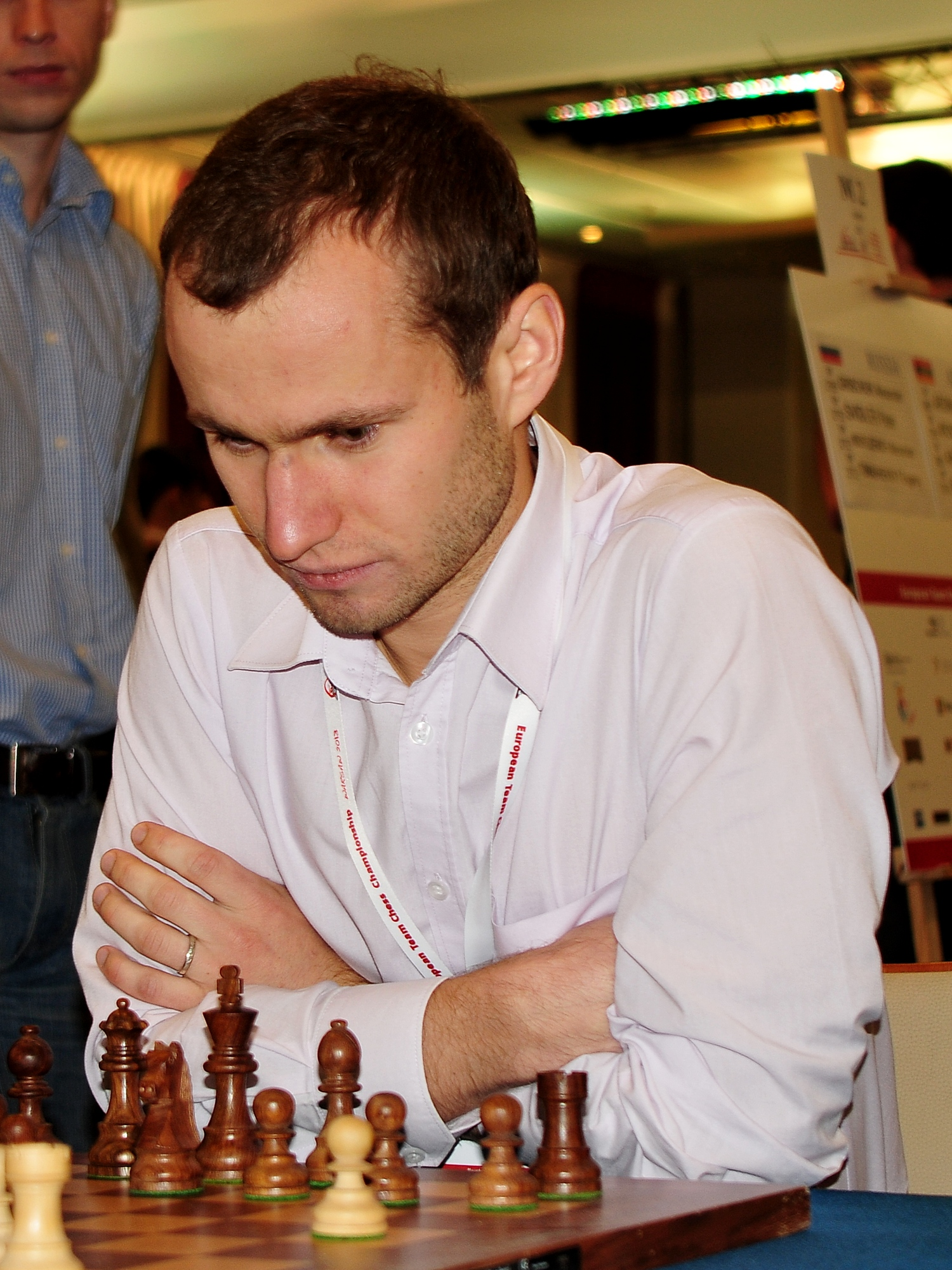
- Zhigalko in 2013

Personal information
- Born: March 28, 1989 (age 37) Minsk, Belarusian SSR, Soviet Union

Chess career
- Country: Belarus
- Title: Grandmaster (2007)
- FIDE rating: 2572 (July 2026)
- Peak rating: 2696 (September 2011)
- Peak ranking: No. 49 (July 2011)

Sergei Alexandrovich Zhigalko (Belarusian: Сяргей Аляксандравіч Жыгалка, Syarheĭ Aliaksandravič Zhyhalka; born March 28, 1989) is a Belarusian chess player who holds the FIDE title of Grandmaster. He is a three-time national champion and also a European and world champion in his age category. Zhigalko competed in the FIDE World Cup in 2007, 2011, 2015 and 2017.

== Career ==
Zhigalko won the Under 14 division at the European Youth Chess Championships and the World Youth Chess Championships in 2003, and the Under 18 at the European Youth Championships in 2006.

In 2007, he took part in the FIDE World Cup for the first time as one of the five FIDE President's nominees and was knocked out in the first round by Krishnan Sasikiran. In 2009, Zhigalko came second on tiebreaks in the World Junior Chess Championship to Maxime Vachier-Lagrave. He won the Belarusian Chess Championship in 2009, 2012 and 2013.

Sharing fifth place in the 2011 European Individual Chess Championship earned him a place in the World Cup held that year. He lost in the first round to Anton Filippov. Zhigalko won the Baku Open in 2011 and in 2012.

At the World Cup 2015 he reached the second round by defeating Ivan Bukavshin in round one and was eliminated by Veselin Topalov. In 2017 he lost in the first round to Yuriy Kuzubov. In the same year Zhigalko won the European Blitz Chess Championship in Katowice, Poland.

=== Team competitions ===
Zhigalko has played for the Belarusian national team at the Chess Olympiad, the World Team Chess Championship, the European Team Chess Championship and the Children Chess Olympiad. In the European Club Cup, he won the team bronze medal in 2010 playing for Ukrainian team A DAN DZO & PGMB of Chernigiv and an individual gold medal in 2013 playing board 3 for PGMB Rostov-on-Don.

== Personal life ==
His older brother is grandmaster Andrey Zhigalko.
