= Maria Fominykh =

Russian chess player (born 1987)

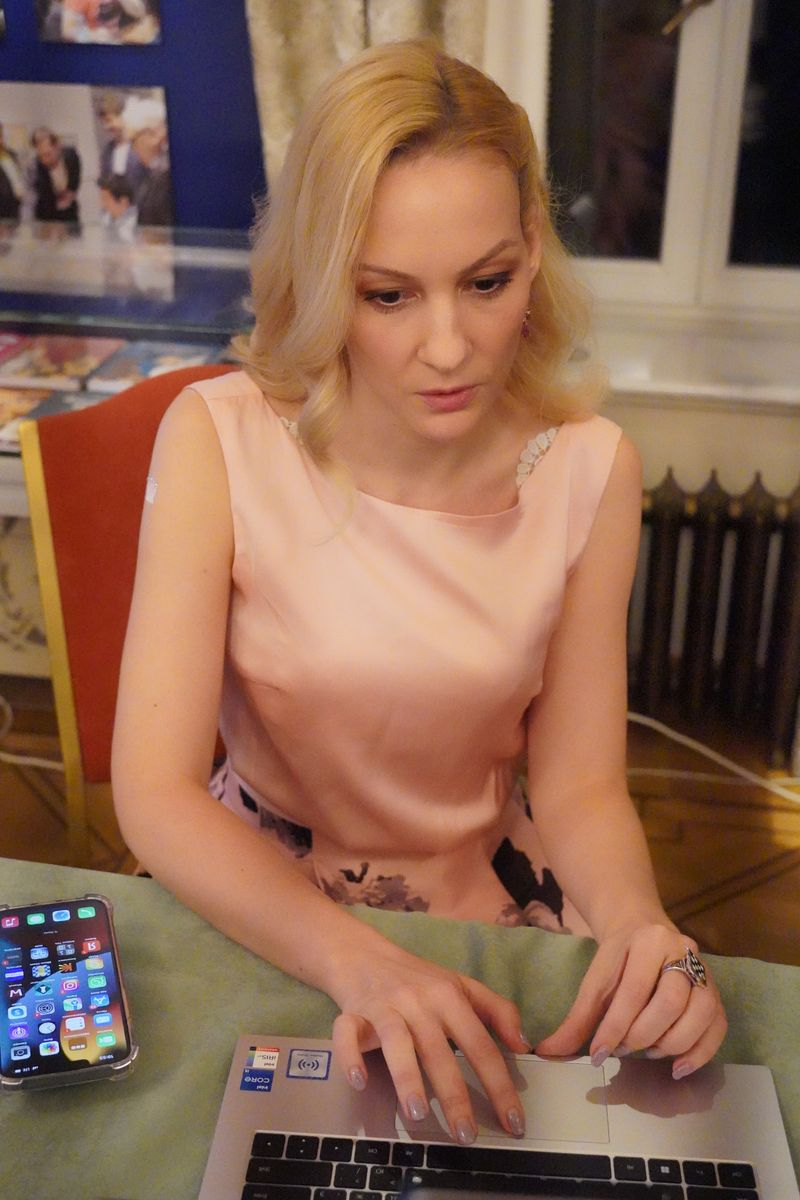
- Maria Fominykh in 2023

Personal information
- Full name: Maria Vladimirovna Fominykh
- Born: 6 February 1987 (age 39) Krasnoyarsk, Russia

Chess career
- Country: Russia
- Title: Woman Grandmaster (2017)
- FIDE rating: 2186 (August 2022)
- Peak rating: 2335 (July 2005)

Maria Vladimirovna Fominykh (Russian: Мария Владимировна Фоминых; born 6 February 1987) is a Russian chess player who was awarded the title of FIDE Woman Grandmaster in 2017.

== Biography ==
Maria Fominykh learned to play chess at the age of seven. She is a two-time winner of Russian Youth Chess Championships: in 2001, in the U14 girls age group and in 2003, in the U16 girls age group.

From 1997 to 2004, Fominykh represented Russia at the European Youth Chess Championships and World Youth Chess Championships in different age groups, where she won four medals: gold (in 2003, at the European Youth Chess Championship in the U16 girls age group), silver (in 2001, at the World Youth Chess Championship in the U14 girls age group) and two bronze (in 2002, at the World Youth Chess Championship in the U16 girls age group, and in 2004, at the European Youth Chess Championship in the U18 girls age group).

In 2006, Fominykh took third place in the Russian Women's Chess Cup. In 2010, she took third place in the [Moscow] Women's Chess Championship. Maria Fominykh received prizes of many international chess tournaments, including second place in Lviv and Moscow International Women's Chess Tournaments in 2010.

In 2009, she was awarded the FIDE Woman International Master (WIM) title and received the FIDE Woman Grandmaster (WGM) title eight years later.

Fominykh is a journalist by profession. She has directed several chess broadcasts on various Russian TV channels.

Husband - chess player Alexander Morozevich.
