= Fiona Sieber =

German chess player

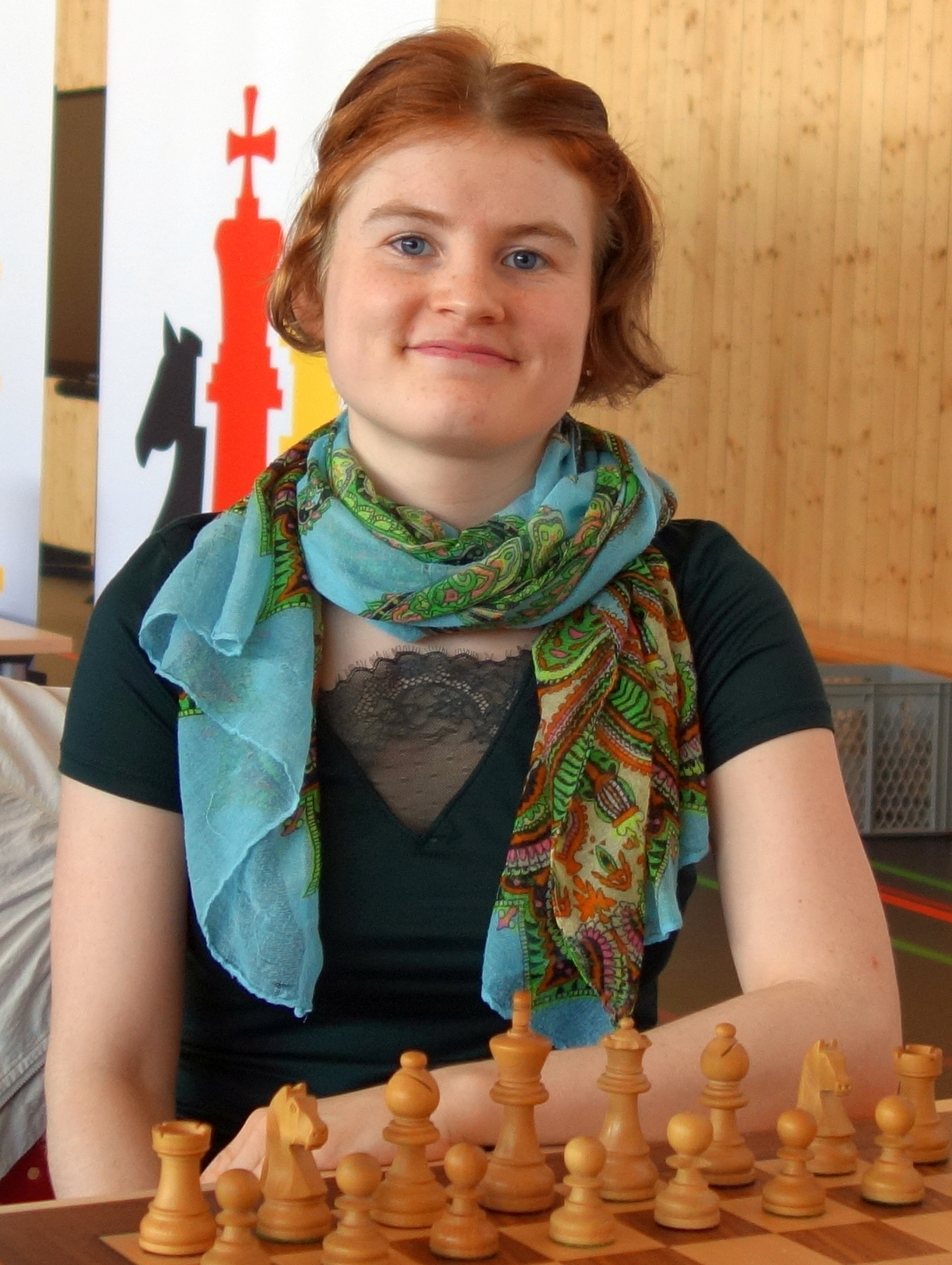
- Sieber in 2024

Personal information
- Born: 14 February 2000 (age 26)

Chess career
- Country: Germany
- Title: Woman Grandmaster (2023)
- Peak rating: 2332 (May 2017)

Fiona Sieber (born 14 February 2000) is a German chess player. She received the FIDE title of Woman International Master (WIM) in 2017.

== Biography ==
In 2015, Fiona Sieber won international youth chess tournament Jugendmasters 2015. She has repeatedly represented Germany at European Youth Chess Championships and World Youth Chess Championships, where she won European Youth Chess Championship in 2016 in the U16 girls age group. She two times played for Germany in World Youth U16 Chess Olympiads (2014, 2016) and won individual bronze medal in 2014.

In German Chess Bundesliga she played for Magdeburg's chess club SG Aufbau Elbe Magdeburg.
