= Kiprian Berbatov =

Bulgarian chess player

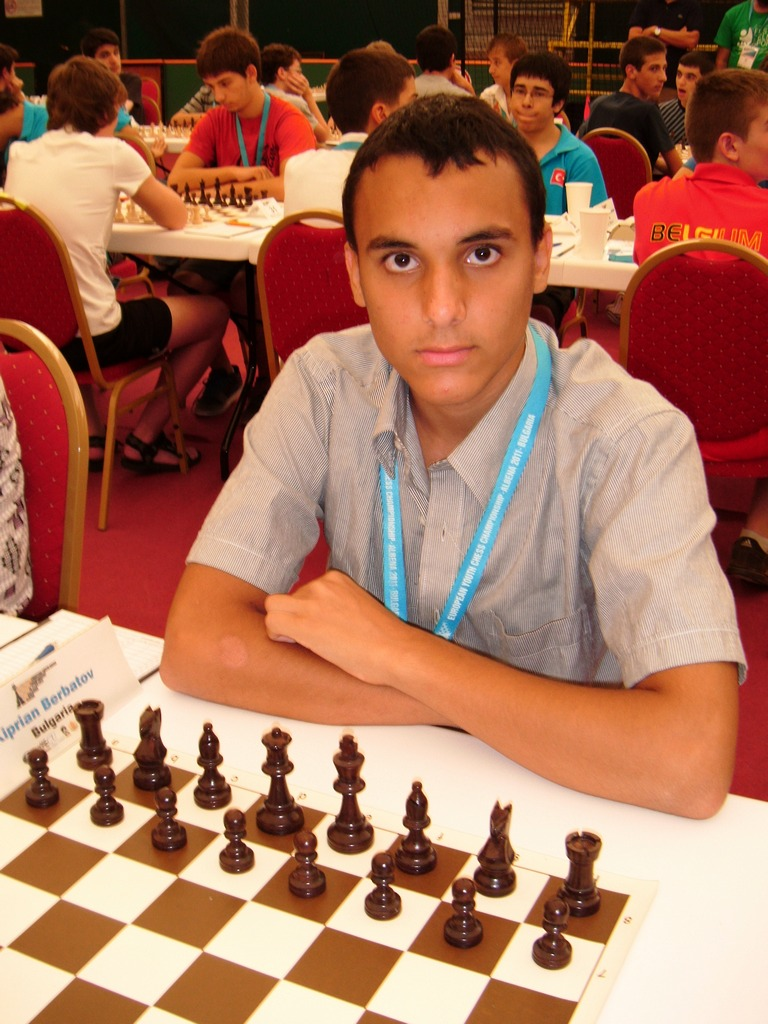
- Kiprian Berbatov in 2011

Personal information
- Born: 6 August 1996 (age 29) Blagoevgrad, Bulgaria

Chess career
- Country: Bulgaria
- Title: International Master (2009)
- FIDE rating: 2456 (July 2026)
- Peak rating: 2490 (May 2011)

Kiprian Berbatov (Bulgarian: Киприан Бербатов; born 6 August 1996) is a Bulgarian chess player who holds the title of International Master (IM) (2009).

== Biography ==
Kiprian Berbatov is cousin of the Bulgarian national football player Dimitar Berbatov.

He played for Bulgaria in European Youth Chess Championships and World Youth Chess Championships in the different age groups and won two medals: European Youth Chess Championship's gold in U12 age group (2008) and European Youth Chess Championship's bronze in U10 age group (2005).

Kiprian Berbatov is winner of several international chess tournaments, including winning or shared first places in Arteixo and Ferrol (both 2008), Sautron and Torredembarra (both 2009), and Seville (2010). In 2010, in Khanty-Mansiysk Kiprian Berbatov played for Bulgaria team in 39th Chess Olympiad.

In 2009, he was awarded the FIDE International Master (IM) title.

Since 2011, Kiprian Berbatov has not participated in chess tournaments.
