= Mariam Danelia =

Georgian chess player (born 1994)

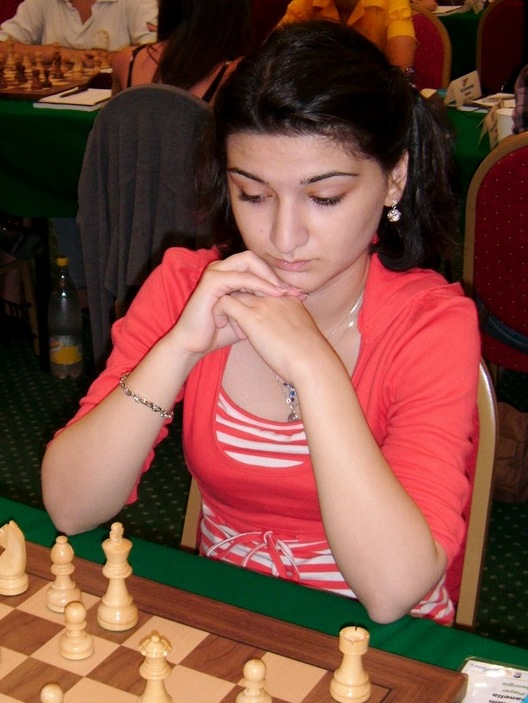
- Danelia in 2011

Personal information
- Born: 24 January 1994 (age 32)

Chess career
- Country: Georgia
- Title: Woman International Master (2008)
- FIDE rating: 2166 (March 2020)
- Peak rating: 2283 (December 2015)

Mariam Danelia (Georgian: მარიამ დანელია; born 24 January 1994) is a Georgian chess player who holds the FIDE title of Woman International Master (WIM, 2008).

== Biography ==
She learned to play chess at the age of five. Danelia repeatedly represented Georgia at the European Youth Chess Championships and World Youth Chess Championships in different age groups, where she won three medals: two gold (in 2006, at the World Youth Chess Championship in the U12 girls age group and in 2010, at the European Youth Chess Championship in the U16 girls age group) and silver (in 2006, at the European Youth Chess Championship in the U10 girls age group).

In 2008, she was awarded the FIDE Woman International Master (WIM) title.

In 2009, she won Georgian Youth Chess Championship in the U16 girls age group. In 2010, she won silver medal in Georgian Youth Chess Championship in the U16 girls age group.

Since 2013, Danelia has been studying at University of Texas at Dallas and has been participating in chess tournaments in United States.
