= Robert Aghasaryan =

Armenian chess grandmaster (born 1994)

Personal information
- Born: March 1, 1994 (age 32) Yerevan, Armenia

Chess career
- Country: Armenia
- Title: Grandmaster (2014)
- FIDE rating: 2537 (July 2026)
- Peak rating: 2537 (June 2018)

Robert Rubeni Aghasaryan (Armenian: Ռոբերտ Աղասարյան; born 1994 in Yerevan, Armenia) is an Armenian chess Grandmaster (2014). He reached an Elo rating of 2537 in June 2018, but as of September 2025 has not played any further rated games since.

== Career ==
Aghasaryan is a three-time youth Armenian champion in the U10, U12, and U18 categories. He won the U10 European Youth Chess 2004 Championship and the U12 World Youth Chess 2006 Championship.

=== Armenian tournaments ===
Other achievements in Armenian tournaments are:

- 2007 March – 3rd place in Armenian men team chess championship.
- 2007 June – 2nd place in Armchessschool 47th competition.
- 2008 April – 4th place in U14 Armenian youth chess championship.
- 2008 May – 4th place in Yerevan's chess Olympiad.
- 2009 April – 2nd place in U16 Armenian youth chess championship.
- 2009 May – 2nd place in Armenian men team chess championship.
- 2010 April – 2nd place in U16 Armenian youth chess championship.
- 2010 November – 1st place in Armenian Students games.
- 2012-02-18 – 3rd place in Armenian men rapid chess championship.
- 2012-04-23 – 4th place in U18 Armenian youth chess championship.
- 2012-05-19 – 2nd place in 82nd Yerevan chess tournament.
- 2012-10-01 – 2nd place in 73rd Armenian first league.

=== International tournaments ===
Other achievements in International tournaments are:

- 2004 January – 2nd place in the competition named after T. Petrosyan's 75th anniversary.
- 2005 January – 3rd place in competition named after H. Kasparyan's 95th anniversary.
- 2006 June – 2nd place in United Nations chess blitz competition.
- 2006 September – 1st place in U14 European team rapid championship.
- 2007 September – 7th place in European youth chess championship.
- 2008 March – 2nd place in regional chess Olympiad.
- 2008 May – 1st place in international team chess competition “Chernobyl’s children”.
- 2008 June – 1st place in under 14 category at “Jermuk 2008” International Open Chess Tournament.
- 2008 July – Divided 1-4 place in Agoura Hills international chess tournament (USA).
- 2009 June – 3rd place in 4th international chess competition named after Dvorkovich.
- 2009 August – 3rd place in U16 World Youth Chess Olympiad.
- 2009 September – 8th place in U16 European Youth Chess Championship.
- 2010 February – 2nd place in G. Kasparian memorial – Young Masters (Chess Academy tournament).
- 2010 March – 2nd place in tournament named after G. Kasparian 100th anniversary (tournament “A”) in Chess School.
- 2010 July – 3rd place in 5th international chess competition named after Dvorkovich.
- 2010 August – 3rd place in Pan-Armenian Chess Tournament.
- 2010 September – divided 3-7 place in U16 Euroyouth 2010 in Batumi.
- 2010 December – 1st place in U16 World Youth Chess 2010 Olympiad.
- 2012-03-17 – 2nd place in international tournament “Spring 2012”.
- 2012-08-19 – 1st place in individual, 2nd place in team chess competition “BAZE 2012”.
- 2012-09-10 – IM norm in Anapachess 2012.
- 2012-11-24 – 2nd place in ARP 10th team and individual chess competition.
- 2013-02-15 – GM norm in Moscow-open 2013.
- 2013-05-17 – 2 GM norms in 14th European Individual Chess Championship.
- 2013-12-08 – 2nd place in ARP 11th team chess competition.
- 2014-02-19 – Fulfilled GM norm in David Bronshtein memorial.
- 2014-04-01 – Received the title of Grandmaster.
- Since February 2015 working at Chess Academy of Armenia as a coach.
- 2015-05-30 – 1st place in Intercollegiate competition.
- 2016-03-30 – 1st place in 17th Republican Intercollegiate games.
- 2016-08-14 – Winner of 21st Pacific Coast Open.
- 2017-01-17 – 3rd place in 7th Andranik Margaryan memorial.
- 2018 - Western Class Championship in California.
