= Varvara Mestnikova =

Russian chess player (born 1995)

Personal information
- Born: 6 May 1995 (age 31)

Chess career
- Country: Russia
- Title: Woman FIDE Master (2005)
- Peak rating: 1902 (October 2006)

Varvara Mestnikova (Russian: Варвара Кимовна Местникова; born 6 May 1995) is a Russian chess player who holds the title of Women FIDE Master (WFM) (2005).

== Biography ==
Varvara Mestnikova was student of Sakhalin chess school, later moved to Voronezh. In 2005, in Herceg Novi Varvara Mestnikova won European Youth Chess Championship in the U10 girl's age group. About this success she became Women FIDE Master (WFM) title. Since 2008, she rarely participate in chess tournaments.

In 2016 Varvara Mestnikova graduated from Saint Petersburg Herzen University.
