= Varvara Saulina =

Russian chess player (born 1992)

Personal information
- Born: 31 March 1992 (age 34)

Chess career
- Country: Russia
- Title: Woman FIDE Master (2005)
- Peak rating: 2298 (July 2010)

Varvara Saulina (Russian: Варвара Алексеевна Саулина; née Repina, born 31 March 1992) is a Russian Woman FIDE Master (WFM) (2005).

== Biography ==
Varvara Saulina two times won Russian Youth Chess Championships: in 2008, at the U16 girls age group, and in 2010, at the U18 girls age group. She repeatedly represented Russia at the European Youth Chess Championships and World Youth Chess Championships in different age groups, where she won three medals: two gold (in 2005 and 2006, at the European Youth Chess Championship in the U14 girls age group) and silver (in 2008, at the European Youth Chess Championship in the U16 girls age group).

In 2011, she won Moscow chess festival Moscow Open tournament "D". In this same year in Magnitogorsk she successfully participated in the Russian Women's Chess Cup, where she won second place only in the final lost Anastasia Bodnaruk. In 2014, in Kazan she won the Russian Chess Universiada Women's Tournament.

In 2014, she graduated from Russian State Social University and working as youth chess trainer.
