= Timur Fakhrutdinov =

Russian chess player (born 2001)

Personal information
- Born: 4 August 2001 (age 24)

Chess career
- Country: Russia
- Title: FIDE Master (2014)
- FIDE rating: 2471 (July 2026)
- Peak rating: 2501 (November 2019)

Timur Fakhrutdinov (Russian: Тимур Фахрутдинов) is a Russian chess FIDE Master (2014).

== Biography ==
Timur Fakhrutdinov was a student at Yekaterinburg Chess School. In 2017, he ranked third in the Russian Youth Chess Championship in the U17 age group and won the Russian Youth Rapid Chess Championship in the U17 age group.

Timur Fakhrutdinov has repeatedly represented Russia at European Youth Chess Championships and World Youth Chess Championships, where he won two gold medals: in 2014, in Batumi in the European Youth Chess Championship U14 boys age group, and in 2016, in Prague in the European Youth Chess Championship U16 boys age group. In 2013, he won the European Youth Rapid Chess Championship in the U12 age group.

In 2017, he represented Russia in the World Youth U16 Chess Olympiad, where he won a team gold medal and an individual silver medal.
