= Alexandr Kharitonov (chess player) =

Russian chess grandmaster (born 1986)

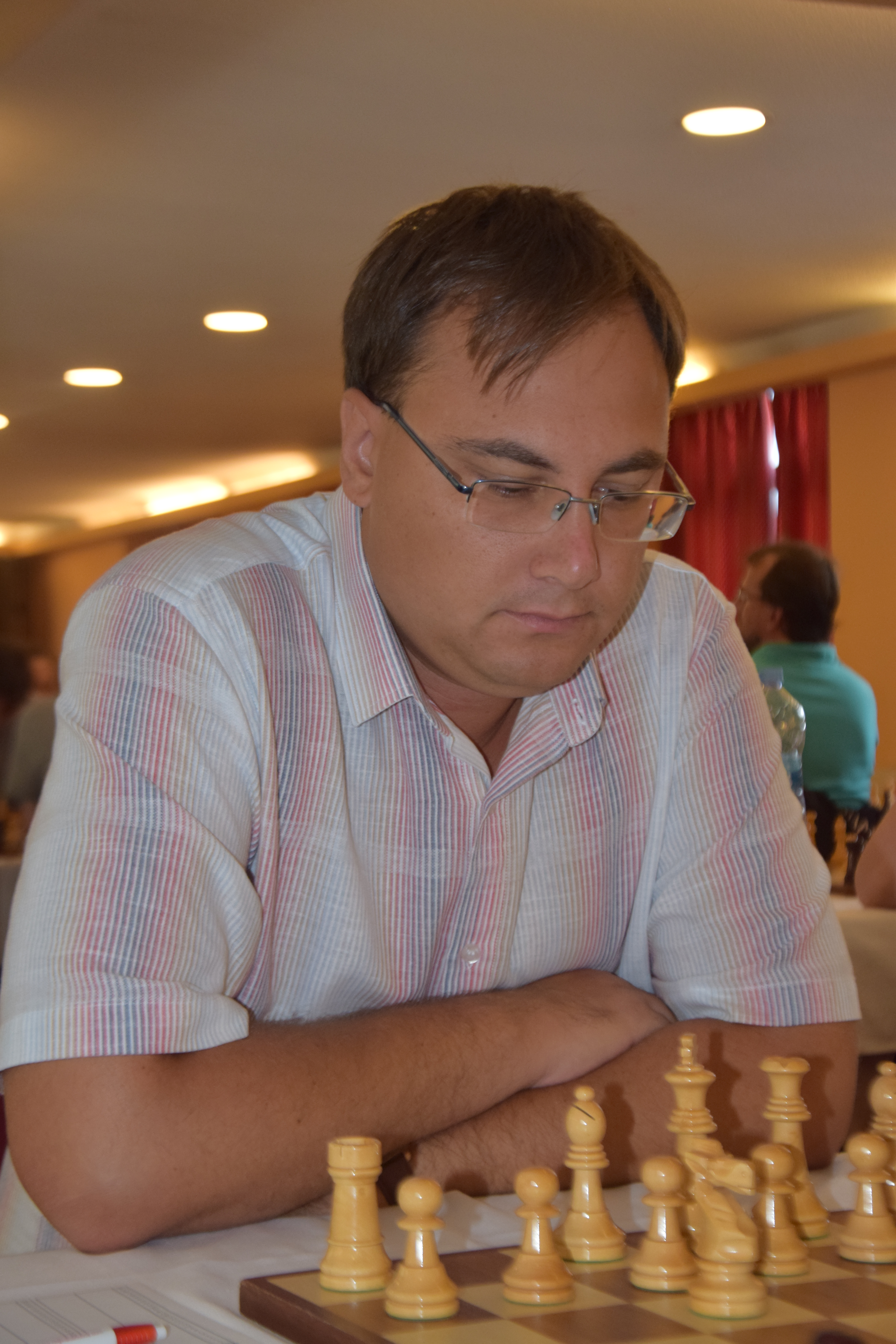
- Kharitonov at the 2019 Andorra open

Personal information
- Full name: Alexandr Sergeevich Kharitonov
- Born: 8 November 1986 (age 39) Obninsk, Russia

Chess career
- Country: Russia
- Title: Grandmaster (2006); International Correspondence Chess Master (2003)
- FIDE rating: 2524 (July 2026)
- Peak rating: 2571 (March 2016)

Alexandr Sergeevich Kharitonov (Russian: Александр Сергеевич Харитонов; born 8 November 1986) is a Russian chess grandmaster (2006).

== Biography ==
Kharitonov repeatedly represented Russia at the European Youth Chess Championships and World Youth Chess Championships in different age groups, where he won three medals: gold (in 2002, at the European Youth Chess Championship in the U16 age group), silver (in 2003, at the World Youth Chess Championship in the U18 age group) and bronze (in 2003, at the European Youth Chess Championship in the U18 age group).

He is a winner of many international chess tournaments, including winning of first prize in Ryazan (2001), Ostrava (2002), Jeseník (2002), Eforie (2004, 2005).

In 2002, Kharitonov was awarded the FIDE International Master (IM) title and received the FIDE Grandmaster (GM) title four years later.
