= Vadim Moiseenko =

Russian chess grandmaster (born 1994)

Personal information
- Born: 7 July 1994 (age 32)

Chess career
- Country: Russia
- Title: Grandmaster (2018)
- FIDE rating: 2518 (July 2026)
- Peak rating: 2567 (August 2017)

Vadim Moiseenko (Russian: Вадим Константинович Моисеенко; born 7 July 1994) is a Russian chess grandmaster (2011).

== Biography ==
Vadim Moiseenko started playing chess at the age of five. He is Vologda student of chess school. In 2001, he took second place in the Russian Youth Chess Championship in U8 age group behind winner Daria Voit. In the following years, Vadim Moiseenko occasionally participated in chess tournament, but in 2012 Prague represented Russia in European Youth Chess Championship in the U18 age group, where he became a winner. In 2012, he started studying in Saint Petersburg and less time left for chess. Vadim Moiseenko has successfully participated in Finland International Chess Tournament Heart of Finland, where he was third in 2014, won in 2016, and took second place in 2017. In 2016, he was second in the Russian Student Chess Championship and won third place in the Russian Fast Chess Championship. In 2017, in Kazan Vadim Moiseenko won the Rashid Nezhmetdinov memorial.

In 2013, Vadim Moiseenko was awarded the FIDE International Master (IM) title and received the FIDE Grandmaster (GM) title five year later. He has also been working as a youth chess coach since 2016.
