= Nino Khomeriki =

Georgian chess player

Personal information
- Born: March 10, 1998 (age 28) Tbilisi, Georgia

Chess career
- Country: Georgia
- Title: Woman Grandmaster (2019)
- Peak rating: 2363 (November 2019)

Nino Khomeriki (Georgian: ნინო ხომერიკი; born March 1, 1998) is a chess player, coach and commentator from Georgia. She was awarded the title of Woman Grandmaster by FIDE in 2019. She won the 2015 and 2016 European Youth Chess Championships.

Khomeriki played for team Georgia in the World Youth U16 Chess Olympiad in 2011, 2012 and 2014. She tied for first place with Aleksandra Maltsevskaya and Gulrukhbegim Tokhirjonova in the World Junior Girls Championship in 2018. Khomeriki took the bronze medal on tiebreak.
