= Marat Fakhrutdinov =

Russian ice hockey player (born 1988)

- Born: November 27, 1988 (age 36); Moscow, Russian SFSR
- Height: 6 ft 2 in (188 cm)
- Weight: 201 lb (91 kg; 14 st 5 lb)
- Position: Forward
- Shoots: Right
- KHL team Former teams: Traktor Chelyabinsk; HC Dynamo Moscow; Severstal Cherepovets; Lada Togliatti
- Playing career: 2006–present

Marat Fakhrutdinov (born November 27, 1988) is a Russian professional ice hockey forward who is currently playing with Traktor Chelyabinsk of the Kontinental Hockey League (KHL).

He first played with HC Severstal in the Kontinental Hockey League (KHL).

In the 2014–15 season, Fakhrutdinov played with HC Lada Togliatti before he was released from his one-year contract on November 4, 2014. On November 16, 2014, he was signed by Traktor Chelyabinsk for the remainder of the season.
