= Dennis Parry =

British novelist

Dennis Arthur Parry (7 November 1912 – 21 June 1955) was a British novelist. He died early as a result of a road accident, and none of his books were ever reprinted beyond a first edition until Valancourt Books reprinted The Survivor (ISBN 978-1941147368) and Sea of Glass (ISBN 978-1941147115), in 2014–2015.

== Critical reception ==
Kirkus Reviews said of The Survivor: "An original and piquant idea, which can stand on its own feet without the link the publishers make for it to Dracula, Dr. Jekyll, etc. ... A strangely fascinating tale, but too uncanonical to appeal to as wide a public as predicted, I fear."

A review of Sea of Glass published in The Times on 19 May 1955, a month before Parry's death, said that "Mr Parry writes with wit, ingenuity, and even a gift for surrealistic fantasy." (The same review also briefly noted "An unusual little fiction ... written by a 19-year-old girl from the Dordogne ... a nice piece of precosity": Francoise Sagan's Bonjour Tristesse). A reviewer in The Spectator was more critical: "A ramshackle plot has been assembled around a clutter of eccentrics ... all this energy, all this talent one feels needs more organisation than Mr Parry seems prepared to bring to them."

== Personal life ==
Parry was educated at Rugby School and King's College, Cambridge where he read classics. He then turned to law and was called to the bar in 1936, practising in the Chancery Division. He was rejected for military service because of poor eyesight, and became a civil servant in the Air Ministry and subsequently the Ministry of Defence.

His obituary in The Times described him as "author of a number of novels which have won both popular favour and critical acclaim".

== Bibliography ==
- Attic Meteor (1936)
- The Bishop's Move, the Autobiography of Dio Lord Bishop of Melitene, Freely Translated from the Lost Original by Dennis Parry and H.M. Champness (1938, with H. M. Champness)
- The Survivor (1940)
- Atalanta's Case (1945)
- Mooncalf (1947)
- Outward Be Fair (1949)
- Fair House of Joy (1950)
- Going Up - Going Down (1953)
- Horseman, Pass By (1954)
- Sea of Glass (1955, published in the US as Varvara, 1956)
