= Marseille-Échecs =

French chess club

- Formation: 2005; 21 years ago
- Type: Chess club
- Headquarters: 7 Papety Street, Marseille, France
- Website: www.marseille-echecs.com

Marseille-Échecs is a French chess club based in Marseille, in the Bouches-du-Rhône department, since 2005. It won the French Club Chess Championship in 2011. The club focuses on youth training and is recognized as a training club by the French Chess Federation. It is the first club to be voted France's best youth club for three consecutive years, in 2021, 2022 and 2023. For the 2024–2025 season, it's the chess club with the most chess players in France, with over 1300 members.

== History ==
The club was born of a merger between the École Française d'Échecs and Réciproque-Échecs in 2005.

The club wins the French Club Chess Championship in 2011 with Étienne Bacrot.

In 2022, David Lacan Rus became world champion in the under-10 age group.

In 2025, Luca Protopopescu became the youngest player in the history of chess to surpass the 2,200 Elo point threshold, at the age of 9 years and 5 days.

== French Club Championship ==
=== First team ===
The first team played in the elite league (“Top 16”, the championship comprising the sixteen best French chess clubs, which was then transformed into the “Top 12” from 2011 to 2020) from 2006 to 2013. Demoted to Nationale 1 in 2013 due to the departure of several of its top players following the loss of municipal subsidies, the team returned to the Top 16 in 2022.

In 2024–2025, the team is still playing in the Top 16.

==== Honours ====
In April 2012, the club was voted best French club after winning the 2010-2011 French Club Chess Championship with the following players: Étienne Bacrot, Arkadij Naiditsch, Kamil Mitoń, Andrei Istrățescu, Yannick Gozzoli, Didier Collas, Laurie Delorme, Aleksander Delchev, Vincent Chauvet et Romain Lambert.

The club also won the Chess French Cup in June 2012.

=== Youth teams ===
Between 2014 and 2017, the club played in "Top Jeunes" before being relegated to "Nationale 1 Jeunes".

Winner of the Nationale 1 Jeunes in the 2017–2018 season.

It is the first club to be voted France's best youth club for three consecutive years, in 2021, 2022 and 2023.

In 2024–2025, the team is playing in the Top Jeunes league.

==== Top Jeunes Honours ====
The club was runner-up in France in 2014.

== Figures ==
During his time with the Marseille-Échecs Club, Étienne Bacrot won the French Chess Championship twice, in 2008 and 2012. In 2009, he won one of the world's most challenging opens, the Aeroflot Open. In October 2010, he defeated reigning world champion Viswanathan Anand at the Pearl Spring chess tournament.

David Lacan Rus becomes the U-10 world champion in 2022.

In April 2025, Luca Protopopescu becomes the youngest player in chess history to surpass the 2,200 Elo point threshold, at the age of 9 years and 5 days.

=== Current club members (in 2025) ===
The list of members by Elo ranking and those of the Top16 and Top Jeunes first team players, which can be consulted on the FFE website includes:

- Jaime Santos Latasa (GM born in 1996)
- Yağız Kaan Erdoğmuş (GM born in 2011)
- Aydın Süleymanlı (GM born in 2005)
- Pierre Laurent-Paoli (GM born in 2000)
- Joseph Girel (GM born in 2004)
- Gabriel Flom (GM born in 1986)
- Mert Erdoğdu (GM born in 1979)
- Luca Protopopescu (CM born in 2016)

=== Previous members ===
- Étienne Bacrot (2007–2013)
- Yannick Gozzoli (2006–2022)
- Aleksander Delchev
- Arkadij Naiditsch

== Club structures ==
=== Presidents ===
- Pierre Gravagna
- Dominique Metras
- Michel Rochette
- Yannick Gozzoli (2014–2018)
- Laurie Delorme (depuis 2018)

=== Membership ===
With over 1,300 licensees during the 2024–2025 season, it is the club with the most chess players in France, far ahead of Echiquier Tressois (less than 900 members).

=== Training ===
Marseille-Échecs works with several schools in the city of Marseille.

In September 2024, Turkish GM and Fide Senior Trainer Mert Erdoğdu becomes the club's head coach.
