= Luca Protopopescu =

French chess player (born 2016)

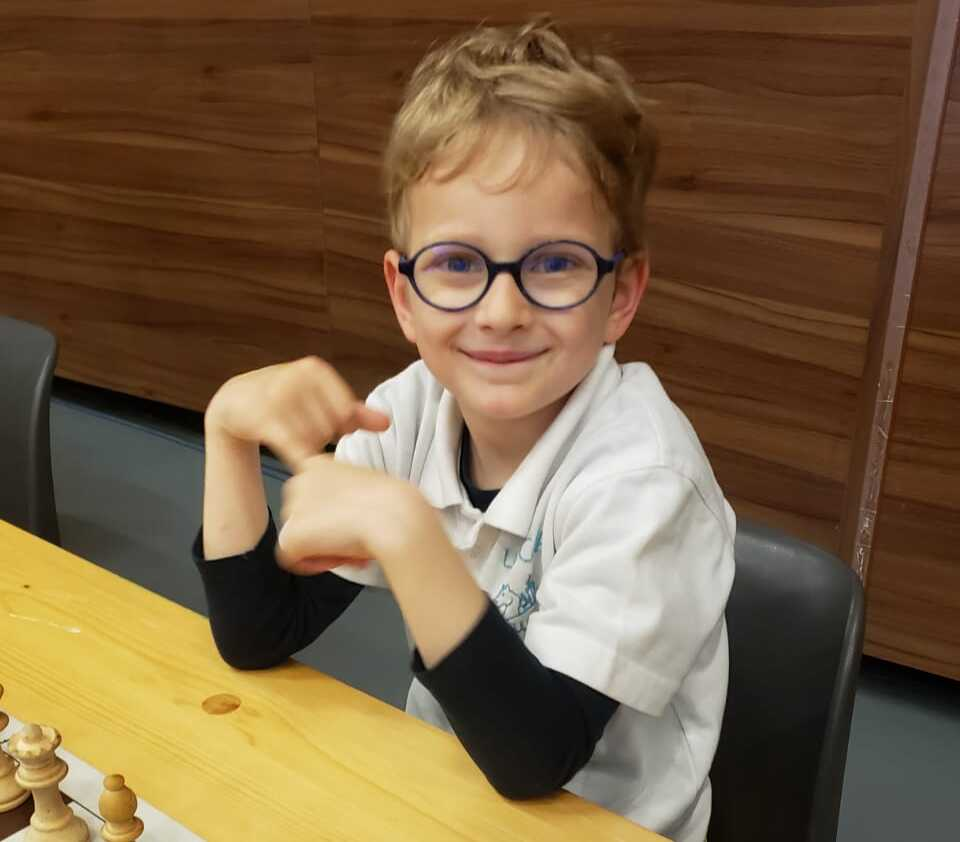
- Luca Protopopescu in 2025

Personal information
- Born: March 27, 2016 (age 10)

Chess career
- Country: France
- Title: Candidate Master (2025)
- Peak rating: 2217 (May 2025)

Luca Protopopescu (born 27 March 2016) is a French chess prodigy. Vice-U8 Europe champion in 2023, ranked number one in the world for under-8s, under-9s and then under-10s, in April 2025, he became the youngest player in chess history to surpass the 2200 Elo point threshold at the age of 9 years and 5 days (notably after beating his former coach, international master Guillaume Philippe, at the Hyères tournament in February 2025, and winning the B tournament at the Cannes International Open), beating the previous record set by England's Ethan Pang in 2024 at the age of 9 years and 103 days.

== Early life ==
He has been a member of the club Marseille-Échecs of the French Chess Federation since the age of 4, shortly after learning the rules of the game in March 2020 during the first COVID-19 pandemic lockdown.

He was French champion in the under-8 age group in 2024, and he is the current under-10 French champion age group since May 2025.

Since September 2024, he has been coached at his club by Turkish grandmaster Mert Erdoğdu.

At the beginning of March 2025, he created a surprise by winning the B tournament (reserved for players under 2200 Elo) at the Cannes International Open. Since the end of March 2025, he has been sponsored by Turkish entrepreneur Evren Üçok, co-founder of Trendyol.

According to a local profile, Protopopescu said, “Je préfère jouer que gagner” (“I prefer playing to winning”).

== Records ==
On 10 April 2025, Protopopescu became the youngest player to surpass the 2200 FIDE classical rating threshold, at 9 years and 5 days, eclipsing the previous mark set by England's Ethan Pang in 2024. On the April 2025 FIDE rating list he was recorded at 2216 and ranked first among players under 10 worldwide.

== Titles ==
FIDE lists Protopopescu with the title of Candidate Master (CM), awarded in 2025.

== Notable tournament results ==
Year	Event	Section	Place	Score	Notes
2025	FIDE World U9-U17 Rapid & Blitz Chess Championships 2025 (Antalya,Turkiye)	U9	1st	7.5/9	
2025	European Youth Chess Championship (Budva, Montenegro)	U10	1st	7.5/9	Performance 2236
2025	Open International d'échecs de Cannes	Open B	1st	7.5/9	Performance 2276; seeded 54th of 181
2025	1er Tournoi Open de Fevrier 2025 de Hyeres	Open	1st	5.5/6	Wins vs IM Guillaume Philippe; performance ~2336

He won the French under-10 national title at Vichy in May 2025.
