= Tata Steel Chess Tournament 2025 =

Chess tournament

	Masters Champion	Challengers Champion
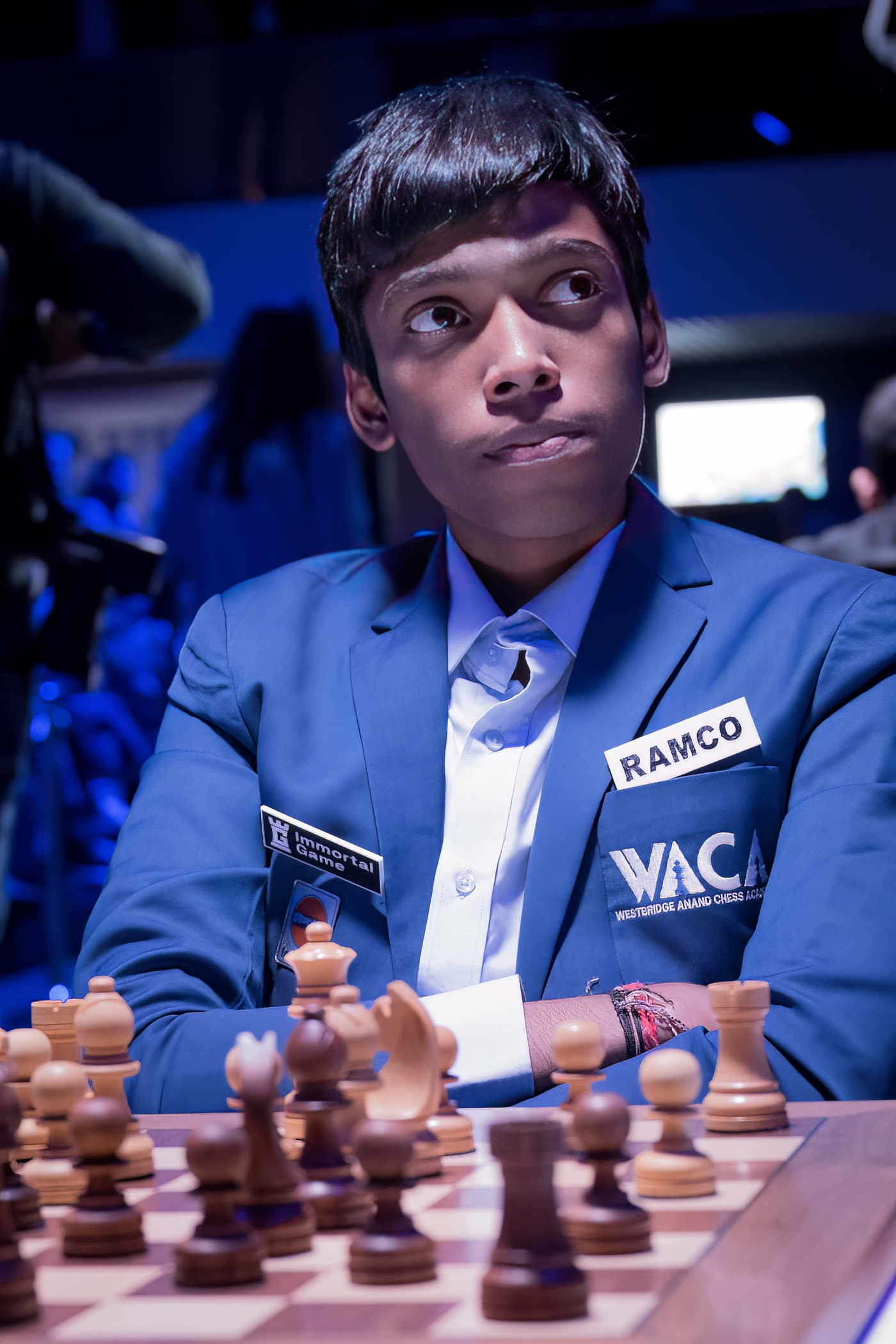
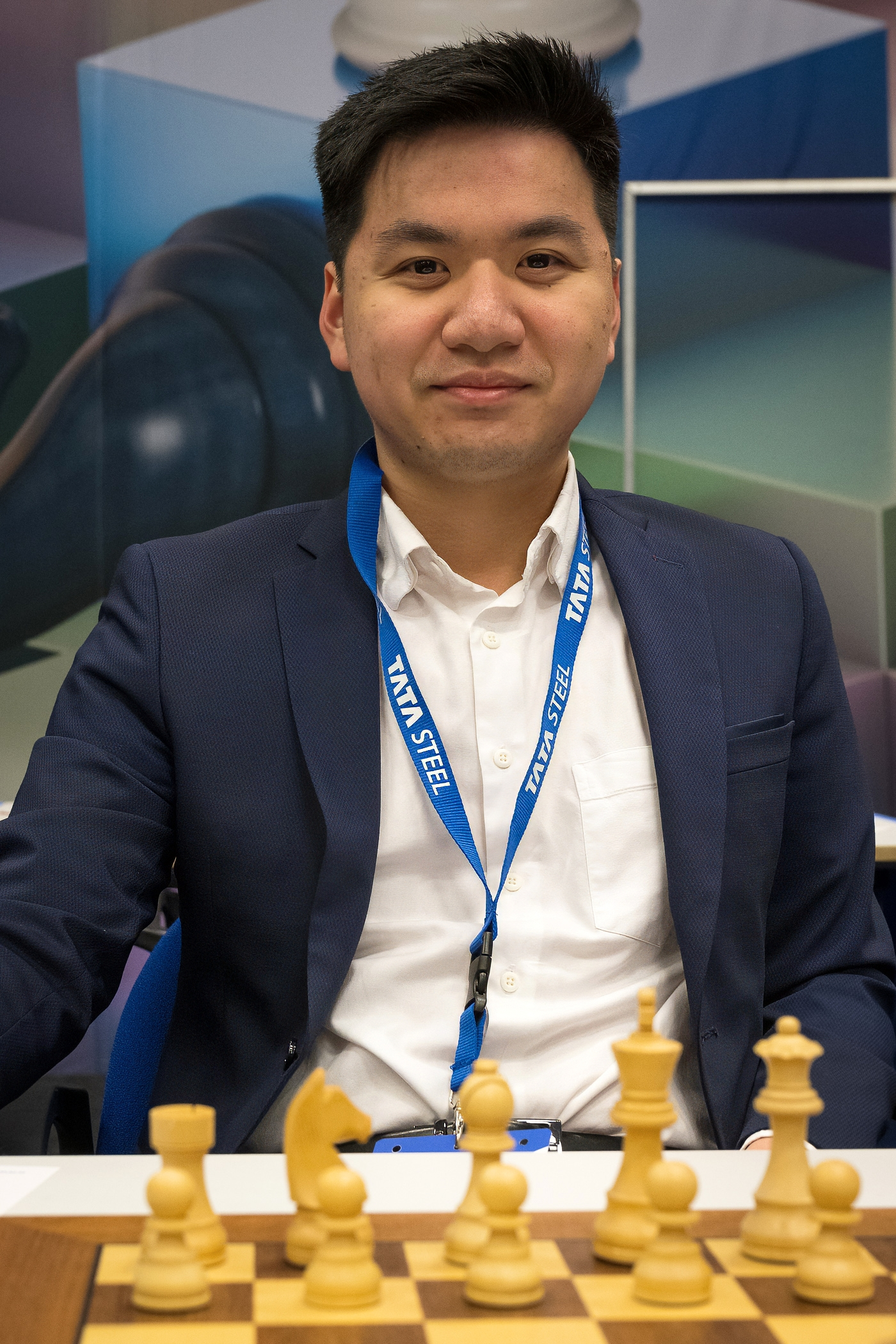
	(India) R Praggnanandhaa	(Czech Republic) Thai Dai Van Nguyen
8½/13	Scores	9½/13
	Born 10 August 2005; 19 years old	Born 12 December 2001; 23 years old

The Tata Steel Chess Tournament 2025 was the 87th edition of the annual chess tournament held in Wijk aan Zee. It was held from 17 January to 2 February 2025. The field of 14 players in the Masters section included the defending champion Wei Yi, as well as 2024 Challengers winner Leon Luke Mendonca. The Challengers section included 11-year-old Argentine prodigy Faustino Oro.

In the Masters section, R Praggnanandhaa defeated Gukesh Dommaraju, the World Champion, in tiebreaks to win the tournament. The Challengers section was won by Thai Dai Van Nguyen.

== Organization ==
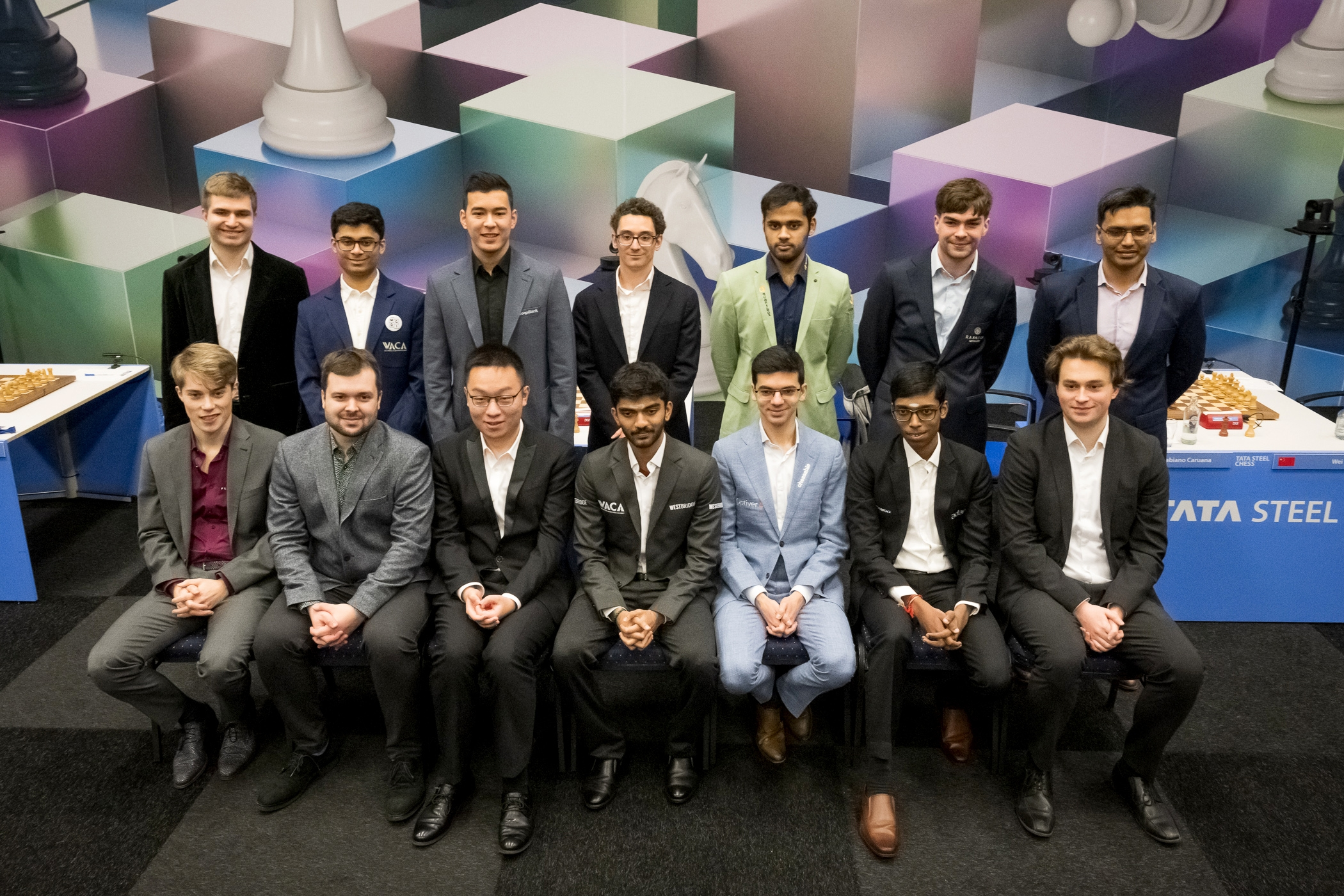
Tata Steel Masters 2025 participants

The tournament was a fourteen-player, single round-robin tournament, meaning there were 13 rounds with each player facing the others once.

The field of 14 players in the Masters section included the defending champion Wei Yi and Gukesh Dommaraju, playing his first international event since becoming the World Chess Champion. Five of the top ten players participated. Chess.com labelled the event as the year's "first super-tournament". Tournament director Jeroen van den Berg said that he "selected as many players as possible with a strong mentality and willing to fight for the win".

=== Regulations ===
The time control was 100 minutes for the first 40 moves, followed by 50 minutes for 20 moves, then 15 minutes for the rest of the game, with a 30-second increment per move from move 1. Players got 1 point for a win, ½ point for a draw and 0 points for a loss.

== Summary ==
Gukesh–Giri, round 1

Position: c8 black rook, d8 black queen, f8 black rook, g8 black king, a7 black pawn, b7 black pawn, d7 black bishop, f7 black pawn, g7 black pawn, c6 black knight, e6 black pawn, f6 black knight, h6 black pawn, c5 black bishop, g5 white bishop, e4 white pawn, c3 white knight, f3 white knight, g3 white pawn, a2 white pawn, b2 white pawn, e2 white queen, f2 white pawn, g2 white bishop, h2 white pawn, a1 white rook, f1 white rook, g1 white king

In this position, Gukesh played 14.Bh4!?, allowing Giri to trap his bishop with 14...g5, which Giri played after a long think.

=== Round 1 ===
In his first game as World Champion, Gukesh was expected to play it safe against Giri after a long haul flight overnight and having landed only hours before the start of the game. Instead he sacrificed a bishop to complicate the position after being out-prepared in the opening. Giri found several accurate moves and acquired a winning advantage, but missed the only winning move on move 35 in mutual time trouble and lost the game. Harikrishna traded his queen for two rooks and made gradual progress eventually beating Erigaisi in 63 moves. Vincent Keymer escaped a lost position against Mendonca when his opponent blundered into a mating attack. Abdusattorov left his queen en prise for four moves against Praggnanandhaa and achieved a significant edge, but couldn't convert the advantage. In the Challengers section, 14-year-old Lu defeated World Junior Champion Nogerbek, while Yakubboev, Van Nguyen, Gurel and Vaishali all scored wins.

=== Round 2 ===
Abdusattorov played a novelty on move 6 in an Advance French against Mendonca and won with a decisive queenside attack in 31 moves. Harikrishna played ambitiously against Praggnanandhaa but was forced to defend a pawn-down endgame. Both players misevaluated a rook exchange that would have led to a draw, and Praggnanandhaa went on to win after Harikrishna avoided the trade multiple times. Jorden van Foreest chose a rare setup against Caruana's London System and got a small advantage, but later misplayed and lost the game. Gukesh defended precisely to hold a draw against Fedoseev. Erigiasi had chances to win against Giri but eventually had to settle for a draw. Bok, l'Ami and Svane scored their first wins in the Challengers.

=== Round 3 ===
Erigiasi defended too passively and was outplayed by Praggnanandhaa, who scored his second win. Abdusattorov tactically won a pawn against Warmerdam, who put up stiff resistance but ultimately lost the game. Gukesh reached a slightly better position against Caruana, but couldn't see a way to make further progress and settled for a draw. Wei was outprepared by Keymer, but the latter failed to exploit a mistake by his opponent. In the Challengers, white won on all seven boards in round 3. The player with the white pieces was higher rated on every board, except for in Lu–Svane.

=== Round 4 ===
Arjun–Fedoseev, round 4

Position: a8 black rook, g8 black rook, h8 black king, a7 black pawn, b7 black pawn, f7 black queen, h7 black pawn, c5 black pawn, d5 black pawn, e5 white pawn, f5 black pawn, g5 white rook, c4 black knight, f4 white pawn, h4 white knight, g3 white queen, a2 white pawn, b2 white pawn, h2 white pawn, c1 white king, f1 white rook

In this position, Arjun played 27.Nxf5??, blundering his knight to 27...Qxf5! 28.Rxf5 Rxg3 29.hxg3 Ne3 winning back the rook.

Praggnanandhaa took the sole lead of the tournament after completing a hat-trick with a win against Mendonca. Erigaisi had a winning position against Fedoseev but blundered a piece in a tactical sequence and lost the game. Harikrishna sacrificed both of his knights against Warmerdam and scored his second win, moving to one point behind the leader, joined by Gukesh, Keymer, Fedoseev and Caruana. In the Challengers, Deshmukh and Vaishali scored upset wins over Gurel and Yakubboev, respectively, while Lu, l'Ami and Nguyen tied for the lead.

=== Round 5 ===
Abdusattorov caught up to Praggnanandhaa in the standings after winning a brilliant game against van Foreest despite getting an inferior position out of the opening. Gukesh won a pawn against Keymer and went on to convert his advantage and score his second win. Fedoseev accurately converted a winning endgame after exploiting a single mistake by Caruana. l'Ami emerged the sole leader in the Challengers with a win over Deshmukh, while Lu suffered her first loss against Bok.

Abdusattorov–Gukesh, round 6

Position: e8 white rook, a7 white rook, e6 black knight, f6 black king, h6 white pawn, g5 black rook, g4 white pawn, c3 black rook, f3 white pawn, g2 white king

In this position, Gukesh played 60...Re5!, the only drawing move. He revealed he was briefly even hoping for more than a draw, as the black rooks and knight threaten to deliver checkmate.

=== Round 6 ===
Sarana scored the day's sole win in the Masters against Fedoseev after acquiring a strong passed pawn and winning material. Abdusattorov came close to a win against Gukesh, but couldn't convert his advantage in the end after tenacious defense by his opponent. In the Challengers, l'Ami maintained his lead, while Oro and Suleymanli both scored their second wins against Deshmukh and Gurel, respectively.

=== Round 7 ===
Gukesh joined the lead after defeating Harikrishna, who played the French Defence, which was Ding Liren's defense of choice against Gukesh in their World Championship match. Fedoseev bounced back from his previous day's loss with a convincing win over Keymer. Warmerdam scored his first win in brilliant fashion while inflicting a fourth loss on Erigaisi, who slipped into last place. In the Challengers, Nguyen defeated Oro to catch l'Ami in the lead, while Lu defeated Deshmukh and moved to half a point behind the leaders. Gurel and Svane won also against Yakubboev and Bulmaga, respectively.

== Standings ==
87th Tata Steel Masters, 17 January – 2 February 2025, Wijk aan Zee, Netherlands, Category XX (2726)
	Player	Rating	1	2	3	4	5	6	7	8	9	10	11	12	13	14	Total	TB	SB	TPR
1	R Praggnanandhaa (India)	2741		½	½	1	0	½	1	0	1	1	½	1	1	½	8½	2	52.75	2834
2	Gukesh Dommaraju (India)	2777	½		½	½	1	½	1	1	½	0	½	½	1	1	8½	1	53.00	2832
3	Nodirbek Abdusattorov (Uzbekistan)	2768	½	½		½	½	½	½	½	½	0	1	1	1	1	8		49.00	2809
4	Vladimir Fedoseev (Slovenia)	2717	0	½	½		½	½	1	1	1	1	½	0	0	1	7½		46.50	2783
5	Anish Giri (Netherlands)	2731	1	0	½	½		½	½	½	½	½	½	½	½	1	7		44.25	2754
6	Wei Yi (China)	2751	½	½	½	½	½		½	½	½	½	½	½	½	1	7		44.25	2753
7	Pentala Harikrishna (India)	2695	0	0	½	0	½	½		½	½	1	½	1	½	1	6½		37.75	2728
8	Vincent Keymer (Germany)	2733	1	0	½	0	½	½	½		0	½	½	½	1	½	6		38.25	2696
9	Fabiano Caruana (United States)	2803	0	½	½	0	½	½	½	1		½	1	½	½	0	6		38.00	2691
10	Arjun Erigaisi (India)	2801	0	1	1	0	½	½	0	½	½		½	½	½	0	5½		37.50	2663
11	Jorden van Foreest (Netherlands)	2680	½	½	0	½	½	½	½	½	0	½		½	½	½	5½		35.75	2672
12	Alexey Sarana (Serbia)	2677	0	½	0	1	½	½	0	½	½	½	½		½	½	5½		35.00	2672
13	Leon Luke Mendonca (India)	2639	0	0	0	1	½	½	½	0	½	½	½	½		½	5		31.25	2645
14	Max Warmerdam (Netherlands)	2646	½	0	0	0	0	0	0	½	1	1	½	½	½		4½		26.75	2622

=== Tiebreaks ===
The tiebreak was a two-game blitz match, followed by "sudden death" games. The time control was 3 minutes with a 2-second increment per move. In sudden death, White started with 2 minutes and 30 seconds. Praggnanandhaa lost the first tiebreak, then equalised, and in sudden death beat Gukesh to become the 2025 Tata Steel champion.

Name	1	2	SD	Total
(India) R Praggnanandhaa	0	1	1	2
(India) Gukesh Dommaraju	1	0	0	1

=== Challengers ===
87th Tata Steel Challengers, 17 January – 2 February 2025, Wijk aan Zee, Netherlands, Category XII (2546.5)
	Player	Rating	1	2	3	4	5	6	7	8	9	10	11	12	13	14	Total	SB	TPR
1	GM Thai Dai Van Nguyen (Czech Republic)	2668		½	½	1	1	½	0	½	1	1	1	½	1	1	9½	55.75	2712
2	GM Aydin Suleymanli (Azerbaijan)	2623	½		½	0	½	1	1	1	1	½	½	1	1	1	9½	55.00	2716
3	GM Erwin l'Ami (Netherlands)	2614	½	½		½	1	½	½	½	0	1	½	1	1	1	8½	49.00	2651
4	GM Nodirbek Yakubboev (Uzbekistan)	2659	0	1	½		½	0	½	½	0	1	1	1	1	1	8	44.25	2625
5	GM Benjamin Bok (Netherlands)	2583	0	½	0	½		1	½	½	½	1	½	1	1	1	8	43.00	2631
6	GM Ediz Gürel (Turkey)	2624	½	0	½	1	0		½	½	1	½	1	0	1	1	7½	43.25	2598
7	GM Frederik Svane (Germany)	2664	1	0	½	½	½	½		½	½	0	½	1	1	1	7½	43.00	2594
8	GM Kazybek Nogerbek (Kazakhstan)	2514	½	0	½	½	½	½	½		1	0	½	1	1	1	7½	41.25	2606
9	GM Vaishali Rameshbabu (India)	2476	0	0	1	1	½	0	½	0		½	½	½	1	½	6	35.50	2523
10	IM Lu Miaoyi (China)	2429	0	½	0	0	0	½	1	1	½		½	1	0	½	5½	33.25	2499
11	IM Arthur Pijpers (Netherlands)	2474	0	½	½	0	½	0	½	½	½	½		½	½	1	5½	30.75	2495
12	IM Divya Deshmukh (India)	2490	½	0	0	0	0	1	0	0	½	0	½		0	1	3½	19.00	2376
13	IM Faustino Oro (Argentina)	2447	0	0	0	0	0	0	0	0	0	1	½	1		1	3½	12.75	2379
14	IM Irina Bulmaga (Romania)	2386	0	0	0	0	0	0	0	0	½	½	0	0	0		1	5.75	2158

== Results by round ==
=== Masters ===
Round 1 – 18 January 2025
Gukesh Dommaraju	1–0	Anish Giri
Pentala Harikrishna	1–0	Arjun Erigaisi
Jorden van Foreest	½–½	Vladimir Fedoseev
Max Warmerdam	½–½	Alexey Sarana
R Praggnanandhaa	½–½	Nodirbek Abdusattorov
Wei Yi	½–½	Fabiano Caruana
Leon Luke Mendonca	0–1	Vincent Keymer
Round 2 – 19 January 2025
Pentala Harikrishna (1)	0–1	R Praggnanandhaa (½)
Vincent Keymer (1)	½–½	Max Warmerdam (½)
Alexey Sarana (½)	½–½	Wei Yi (½)
Nodirbek Abdusattorov (½)	1–0	Leon Luke Mendonca (0)
Fabiano Caruana (½)	1–0	Jorden van Foreest (½)
Vladimir Fedoseev (½)	½–½	Gukesh Dommaraju (1)
Arjun Erigaisi (0)	½–½	Anish Giri (0)
Round 3 – 20 January 2025
Gukesh Dommaraju (1½)	½–½	Fabiano Caruana (1½)
R Praggnanandhaa (1½)	1–0	Arjun Erigaisi (½)
Max Warmerdam (1)	0–1	Nodirbek Abdusattorov (1½)
Wei Yi (1)	½–½	Vincent Keymer (1½)
Anish Giri (½)	½–½	Vladimir Fedoseev (1)
Jorden van Foreest (½)	½–½	Alexey Sarana (1)
Leon Luke Mendonca (0)	½–½	Pentala Harikrishna (1)
Round 4 – 21 January 2025
Nodirbek Abdusattorov (2½)	½–½	Wei Yi (1½)
R Praggnanandhaa (2½)	1–0	Leon Luke Mendonca (½)
Fabiano Caruana (2)	½–½	Anish Giri (1)
Vincent Keymer (2)	½–½	Jorden van Foreest (1)
Alexey Sarana (1½)	½–½	Gukesh Dommaraju (2)
Pentala Harikrishna (1½)	1–0	Max Warmerdam (1)
Arjun Erigaisi (½)	0–1	Vladimir Fedoseev (1½)
Round 5 – 22 January 2025
Gukesh Dommaraju (2½)	1–0	Vincent Keymer (2½)
Vladimir Fedoseev (2½)	1–0	Fabiano Caruana (2½)
Wei Yi (2)	½–½	Pentala Harikrishna (2½)
Anish Giri (1½)	½–½	Alexey Sarana (2)
Jorden van Foreest (1½)	0–1	Nodirbek Abdusattorov (3)
Max Warmerdam (1)	½–½	R Praggnanandhaa (3½)
Leon Luke Mendonca (½)	½–½	Arjun Erigaisi (½)
Round 6 – 24 January 2025
Nodirbek Abdusattorov (4)	½–½	Gukesh Dommaraju (3½)
R Praggnanandhaa (4)	½–½	Wei Yi (2½)
Pentala Harikrishna (3)	½–½	Jorden van Foreest (1½)
Alexey Sarana (2½)	1–0	Vladimir Fedoseev (3½)
Vincent Keymer (2½)	½–½	Anish Giri (2)
Arjun Erigaisi (1)	½–½	Fabiano Caruana (2½)
Leon Luke Mendonca (1)	½–½	Max Warmerdam (1½)
Round 7 – 25 January 2025
Gukesh Dommaraju (4)	1–0	Pentala Harikrishna (3½)
Vladimir Fedoseev (3½)	1–0	Vincent Keymer (3)
Fabiano Caruana (3)	½–½	Alexey Sarana (3½)
Wei Yi (3)	½–½	Leon Luke Mendonca (1½)
Anish Giri (2½)	½–½	Nodirbek Abdusattorov (4½)
Jorden van Foreest (2)	½–½	R Praggnanandhaa (4½)
Max Warmerdam (2)	1–0	Arjun Erigaisi (1½)

Round 8 – 26 January 2025
Nodirbek Abdusattorov (5)	½–½	Vladimir Fedoseev (4½)
R Praggnanandhaa (5)	½–½	Gukesh Dommaraju (5)
Pentala Harikrishna (3½)	½–½	Anish Giri (3)
Max Warmerdam (3)	0–1	Wei Yi (3½)
Vincent Keymer (3)	0–1	Fabiano Caruana (3½)
Leon Luke Mendonca (2)	½–½	Jorden van Foreest (2½)
Arjun Erigaisi (1½)	½–½	Alexey Sarana (4)
Round 9 – 28 January 2025
Gukesh Dommaraju (5½)	1–0	Leon Luke Mendonca (2½)
Vladimir Fedoseev (5)	1–0	Pentala Harikrishna (4)
Alexey Sarana (4½)	½–½	Vincent Keymer (3)
Fabiano Caruana (4½)	½–½	Nodirbek Abdusattorov (5½)
Wei Yi (4½)	½–½	Arjun Erigaisi (2)
Anish Giri (3½)	1–0	R Praggnanandhaa (5½)
Jorden van Foreest (3)	½–½	Max Warmerdam (3)
Round 10 – 29 January 2025
Nodirbek Abdusattorov (6)	1–0	Alexey Sarana (5)
R Praggnanandhaa (5½)	1–0	Vladimir Fedoseev (6)
Wei Yi (5)	½–½	Jorden van Foreest (3½)
Pentala Harikrishna (4)	½–½	Fabiano Caruana (5)
Max Warmerdam (3½)	0–1	Gukesh Dommaraju (6½)
Arjun Erigaisi (2½)	½–½	Vincent Keymer (3½)
Leon Luke Mendonca (2½)	½–½	Anish Giri (4½)
Round 11 – 31 January 2025
Gukesh Dommaraju (7½)	½–½	Wei Yi (5½)
Vladimir Fedoseev (6)	0–1	Leon Luke Mendonca (3)
Fabiano Caruana (5½)	0–1	R Praggnanandhaa (6½)
Anish Giri (5)	1–0	Max Warmerdam (3½)
Alexey Sarana (5)	0–1	Pentala Harikrishna (4½)
Jorden van Foreest (4)	½–½	Arjun Erigaisi (3)
Vincent Keymer (4)	½–½	Nodirbek Abdusattorov (7)
Round 12 – 1 February 2025
R Praggnanandhaa (7½)	1–0	Alexey Sarana (5)
Wei Yi (6)	½–½	Anish Giri (6)
Pentala Harikrishna (5½)	½–½	Vincent Keymer (4½)
Jorden van Foreest (4½)	½–½	Gukesh Dommaraju (8)
Leon Luke Mendonca (4)	½–½	Fabiano Caruana (5½)
Arjun Erigaisi (3½)	1–0	Nodirbek Abdusattorov (7½)
Max Warmerdam (3½)	0–1	Vladimir Fedoseev (6)
Round 13 – 2 February 2025
Gukesh Dommaraju (8½)	0–1	Arjun Erigaisi (4½)
Nodirbek Abdusattorov (7½)	½–½	Pentala Harikrishna (6)
Vladimir Fedoseev (7)	½–½	Wei Yi (6½)
Anish Giri (6½)	½–½	Jorden van Foreest (5)
Fabiano Caruana (6)	0–1	Max Warmerdam (3½)
Alexey Sarana (5)	½–½	Leon Luke Mendonca (4½)
Vincent Keymer (5)	1–0	R Praggnanandhaa (8½)

==== Points by round ====
This table shows the total number of wins minus the total number of losses each player has after each round. '=' indicates the player has won and lost the same number of games after that round. Green backgrounds indicate the player(s) with the highest score after each round. Red backgrounds indicate player(s) who could no longer win the tournament after each round. (Note: Players are marked in red if there is no permutation of remaining results that allows them to catch up the tournament leader(s) after remaining rounds.)

Rank	Player	Rounds												
Rank	Player	1	2	3	4	5	6	7	8	9	10	11	12	13
1	Gukesh Dommaraju (India)	+1	+1	+1	+1	+2	+2	+3	+3	+4	+5	+5	+5	+4
2	R Praggnanandhaa (India)	=	+1	+2	+3	+3	+3	+3	+3	+2	+3	+4	+5	+4
3	Nodirbek Abdusattorov (Uzbekistan)	=	+1	+2	+2	+3	+3	+3	+3	+3	+4	+4	+3	+3
4	Vladimir Fedoseev (Slovenia)	=	=	=	+1	+2	+1	+2	+2	+3	+2	+1	+2	+2
5	Anish Giri (Netherlands)	-1	-1	-1	-1	-1	-1	-1	-1	=	=	+1	+1	+1
6	Wei Yi (China)	=	=	=	=	=	=	=	+1	+1	+1	+1	+1	+1
7	Pentala Harikrishna (India)	+1	=	=	+1	+1	+1	=	=	-1	-1	=	=	=
8	Vincent Keymer (Germany)	+1	+1	+1	+1	=	=	-1	-2	-2	-2	-2	-2	-1
9	Fabiano Caruana (United States)	=	+1	+1	+1	=	=	=	+1	+1	+1	=	=	-1
10	Arjun Erigaisi (India)	-1	-1	-2	-3	-3	-3	-4	-4	-4	-4	-4	-3	-2
11	Jorden van Foreest (Netherlands)	=	-1	-1	-1	-2	-2	-2	-2	-2	-2	-2	-2	-2
12	Alexey Sarana (Serbia)	=	=	=	=	=	+1	+1	+1	+1	=	-1	-2	-2
13	Leon Luke Mendonca (India)	-1	-2	-2	-3	-3	-3	-3	-3	-4	-4	-3	-3	-3
14	Max Warmerdam (Netherlands)	=	=	-1	-2	-2	-2	-1	-2	-2	-3	-4	-5	-4

=== Challengers ===
Round 1 – 18 January 2025
Aydin Suleymanli	½–½	Benjamin Bok
Divya Deshmukh	0–1	Nodirbek Yakubboev
Ediz Gurel	1–0	Irina Bulmaga
Erwin l'Ami	½–½	Frederik Svane
Faustino Oro	0–1	Vaishali Rameshbabu
Lu Miaoyi	1–0	Kazybek Nogerbek
Thai Dai Van Nguyen	1–0	Arthur Pijpers
Round 2 – 19 January 2025
Nodirbek Yakubboev (1)	½–½	Kazybek Nogerbek (0)
Vaishali Rameshbabu (1)	½–½	Lu Miaoyi (1)
Benjamin Bok (½)	1–0	Ediz Gurel (1)
Frederik Svane (½)	1–0	Faustino Oro (0)
Arthur Pijpers (0)	½–½	Aydin Suleymanli (½)
Divya Deshmukh (0)	½–½	Thai Dai Van Nguyen (1)
Irina Bulmaga (0)	0–1	Erwin l'Ami (½)
Round 3 – 20 January 2025
Erwin l'Ami (1½)	1–0	Benjamin Bok (1½)
Lu Miaoyi (1½)	1–0	Frederik Svane (1½)
Thai Dai Van Nguyen (1½)	1–0	Nodirbek Yakubboev (1½)
Aydin Suleymanli (1)	1–0	Divya Deshmukh (½)
Ediz Gurel (1)	1–0	Arthur Pijpers (½)
Kazybek Nogerbek (½)	1–0	Vaishali Rameshbabu (1½)
Faustino Oro (0)	1–0	Irina Bulmaga (0)
Round 4 – 21 January 2025
Thai Dai Van Nguyen (2½)	½–½	Aydin Suleymanli (2)
Benjamin Bok (1½)	1–0	Faustino Oro (1)
Frederik Svane (1½)	½–½	Kazybek Nogerbek (1½)
Nodirbek Yakubboev (1½)	0–1	Vaishali Rameshbabu (1½)
Arthur Pijpers (½)	½–½	Erwin l'Ami (2½)
Divya Deshmukh (½)	1–0	Ediz Gurel (2)
Irina Bulmaga (0)	½–½	Lu Miaoyi (2½)
Round 5 – 22 January 2025
Erwin l'Ami (3)	1–0	Divya Deshmukh (1½)
Lu Miaoyi (3)	0–1	Benjamin Bok (2½)
Aydin Suleymanli (2½)	0–1	Nodirbek Yakubboev (1½)
Vaishali Rameshbabu (2½)	½–½	Frederik Svane (2)
Ediz Gurel (2)	½–½	Thai Dai Van Nguyen (3)
Kazybek Nogerbek (2)	1–0	Irina Bulmaga (½)
Faustino Oro (1)	½–½	Arthur Pijpers (1)
Round 6 – 24 January 2025
Benjamin Bok (3½)	½–½	Kazybek Nogerbek (3)
Thai Dai Van Nguyen (3½)	½–½	Erwin l'Ami (4)
Aydin Suleymanli (2½)	1–0	Ediz Gurel (2½)
Nodirbek Yakubboev (2½)	½–½	Frederik Svane (2½)
Arthur Pijpers (1½)	½–½	Lu Miaoyi (3)
Divya Deshmukh (1½)	0–1	Faustino Oro (1½)
Irina Bulmaga (½)	½–½	Vaishali Rameshbabu (3)
Round 7 – 25 January 2025
Erwin l'Ami (4½)	½–½	Aydin Suleymanli (3½)
Kazybek Nogerbek (3½)	½–½	Arthur Pijpers (2)
Lu Miaoyi (3½)	1–0	Divya Deshmukh (1½)
Vaishali Rameshbabu (3½)	½–½	Benjamin Bok (4)
Frederik Svane (3)	1–0	Irina Bulmaga (1)
Ediz Gurel (2½)	1–0	Nodirbek Yakubboev (3)
Faustino Oro (2½)	0–1	Thai Dai Van Nguyen (4)

Round 8 – 26 January 2025
Thai Dai Van Nguyen (5)	1–0	Lu Miaoyi (4½)
Benjamin Bok (4½)	½–½	Frederik Svane (4)
Aydin Suleymanli (4)	1–0	Faustino Oro (2½)
Ediz Gurel (3½)	½–½	Erwin l'Ami (5)
Nodirbek Yakubboev (3)	1–0	Irina Bulmaga (1)
Arthur Pijpers (2½)	½–½	Vaishali Rameshbabu (4)
Divya Deshmukh (1½)	0–1	Kazybek Nogerbek (4)
Round 9 – 28 January 2025
Erwin l'Ami (5½)	½–½	Nodirbek Yakubboev (4)
Kazybek Nogerbek (5)	½–½	Thai Dai Van Nguyen (6)
Frederik Svane (4½)	½–½	Arthur Pijpers (3)
Lu Miaoyi (4½)	½–½	Aydin Suleymanli (5)
Vaishali Rameshbabu (4½)	½–½	Divya Deshmukh (1½)
Faustino Oro (2½)	0–1	Ediz Gurel (4)
Irina Bulmaga (1)	0–1	Benjamin Bok (5)
Round 10 – 29 January 2025
Thai Dai Van Nguyen (6½)	1–0	Vaishali Rameshbabu (5)
Erwin l'Ami (6)	1–0	Faustino Oro (2½)
Aydin Suleymanli (5½)	1–0	Kazybek Nogerbek (5½)
Ediz Gurel (5)	½–½	Lu Miaoyi (5)
Nodirbek Yakubboev (4½)	½–½	Benjamin Bok (6)
Arthur Pijpers (3½)	1–0	Irina Bulmaga (1)
Divya Deshmukh (2)	0–1	Frederik Svane (5)
Round 11 – 31 January 2025
Benjamin Bok (6½)	½–½	Arthur Pijpers (4½)
Frederik Svane (6)	1–0	Thai Dai Van Nguyen (7½)
Kazybek Nogerbek (5½)	½–½	Ediz Gurel (5½)
Lu Miaoyi (5½)	0–1	Erwin l'Ami (7)
Vaishali Rameshbabu (5)	0–1	Aydin Suleymanli (6½)
Faustino Oro (2½)	0–1	Nodirbek Yakubboev (5)
Irina Bulmaga (1)	0–1	Divya Deshmukh (2)
Round 12 – 1 February 2025
Erwin l'Ami (8)	½–½	Kazybek Nogerbek (6)
Aydin Suleymanli (7½)	1–0	Frederik Svane (7)
Thai Dai Van Nguyen (7½)	1–0	Irina Bulmaga (1)
Ediz Gurel (6)	1–0	Vaishali Rameshbabu (5)
Nodirbek Yakubboev (6)	1–0	Arthur Pijpers (5)
Divya Deshmukh (3)	0–1	Benjamin Bok (7)
Faustino Oro (2½)	1–0	Lu Miaoyi (5½)
Round 13 – 2 February 2025
Benjamin Bok (8)	0–1	Thai Dai Van Nguyen (8½)
Frederik Svane (7)	½–½	Ediz Gurel (7)
Kazybek Nogerbek (6½)	1–0	Faustino Oro (3½)
Lu Miaoyi (5½)	0–1	Nodirbek Yakubboev (7)
Arthur Pijpers (5)	½–½	Divya Deshmukh (3)
Vaishali Rameshbabu (5)	1–0	Erwin l'Ami (8½)
Irina Bulmaga (1)	0–1	Aydin Suleymanli (8½)

==== Points by round ====
Rank	Player	Rounds												
Rank	Player	1	2	3	4	5	6	7	8	9	10	11	12	13
1	GM Thai Dai Van Nguyen (Czech Republic)	+1	+1	+2	+2	+2	+2	+3	+4	+4	+5	+4	+5	+6
2	GM Aydin Suleymanli (Azerbaijan)	=	=	+1	+1	=	+1	+1	+2	+2	+3	+4	+5	+6
3	GM Erwin l'Ami (Netherlands)	=	+1	+2	+2	+3	+3	+3	+3	+3	+4	+5	+5	+4
4	GM Nodirbek Yakubboev (Uzbekistan)	+1	+1	=	-1	=	=	-1	=	=	=	+1	+2	+3
5	GM Benjamin Bok (Netherlands)	=	+1	=	+1	+2	+2	+2	+2	+3	+3	+3	+4	+3
6	GM Ediz Gürel (Turkey)	+1	=	+1	=	=	-1	=	=	+1	+1	+1	+2	+2
7	GM Frederik Svane (Germany)	=	+1	=	=	=	=	+1	+1	+1	+2	+3	+2	+2
8	GM Kazybek Nogerbek (Kazakhstan)	-1	-1	=	=	+1	+1	+1	+2	+2	+1	+1	+1	+2
9	GM Vaishali Rameshbabu (India)	+1	+1	=	+1	+1	+1	+1	+1	+1	=	-1	-2	-1
10	IM Lu Miaoyi (China)	+1	+1	+2	+2	+1	+1	+2	+1	+1	+1	=	-1	-2
11	IM Arthur Pijpers (Netherlands)	-1	-1	-2	-2	-2	-2	-2	-2	-2	-1	-1	-2	-2
12	IM Divya Deshmukh (India)	-1	-1	-2	-1	-2	-3	-4	-5	-5	-6	-5	-6	-6
13	IM Faustino Oro (Argentina)	-1	-2	-1	-2	-2	-1	-2	-3	-4	-5	-6	-5	-6
14	IM Irina Bulmaga (Romania)	-1	-2	-3	-3	-4	-4	-5	-6	-7	-8	-9	-10	-11

== Controversies ==
In round 4, Nodirbek Yakubboev refused to perform the customary handshake with Vaishali Rameshbabu at the start of their game. In a video that went viral, Vaishali was seen extending her hand to Yakubboev, who sat down without responding. Yakubboev later posted a response on X (formerly Twitter), stating "With all due respect to women and Indian chess players, I want to inform everyone that I do not touch other women for religious reasons" (Note: Yakubboev is Muslim) and "I respect Vaishali and her brother as the strongest chess players in India. If I have offended her with my behavior, I apologize."
