= Abdalrahman Sameh Mohamed =

Egyptian chess player (born 2014)

Personal information
- Born: 2014 (age 11–12)

Chess career
- Country: Egypt
- Title: International Master (2024)
- Peak rating: 2342 (May 2026)

Abdalrahman Sameh Mohamed (born 2014) is an Egyptian chess prodigy and International Master. He first started playing in January 2024 and his rating rapidly increased first winning the National Youth Chess Championship in his U10 age category before winning the African Youth Chess Championship in the same age category with a perfect 9-0 score in June which gave him his first International Master norm. His biggest result followed at the Egyptian National Chess Championship next month in July. Entered as the 18th seed of 369 players, Abdalrahman won scoring 10.5/11 going up 150 rating points and gaining his International Master title in the process. His most recent major win was at the FIDE World Cup in the under 12 category in July, 2025.
