= Roman Shogdzhiev =

Russian chess player (born 2015)

- Shogdzhiev in 2026

Personal information
- Born: Roman Savrovich Shogdzhiev; 4 February 2015 (age 11) Elista, Kalmykia, Russia

Chess career
- Country: Russia (until 2022); FIDE (since 2022)
- Title: International Master (2025)
- FIDE rating: 2484 (November 2026)
- Peak rating: 2484 (November 2026)

Roman Savrovich Shogdzhiev (Russian: Роман Саврович Шогджиев; born 4 February 2015) is a Russian chess player. A chess prodigy, he became the youngest international master in history in May 2025, at the age of 10 years, 3 months, and 21 days.

== Chess career ==
=== 2022–2023 ===
Shogdzhiev, aged 7, playing a friendly match against Anatoly Karpov, aged 71, at the Luzhniki Stadium in Moscow in 2022

In November 2022, Shogdzhiev won the U8 section of the European Youth Chess Championship in Antalya, Turkey. He was tied with Marc Llari and Ali Poyraz Uzdemir, but won owing to a higher Buchholz score.

In October 2023, he won the U8 section of the World Cadets Chess Championship, dominating the section by winning all eleven games.

At the World Rapid and Blitz Chess Championships in December 2023, at the age of eight, he defeated five grandmasters: Jakhongir Vakhidov and Johan-Sebastian Christiansen in the Rapid section, and Kirill Shevchenko, Alan Pichot, and Pranav V in the Blitz section.

=== International Master ===
At the RadnickiChess IM tournament in Belgrade in December 2024, at the age of 9 years, 10 months, and 7 days, he became the youngest player in history to score an IM norm, after drawing in eleven moves against the grandmaster Branko Damljanović in the final round. This made him the world's highest-rated player under the age of eleven and one of only three players (alongside Faustino Oro and Ethan Pang) to have reached a FIDE rating of 2300 prior to turning ten years old.

He scored his second IM norm in May 2025, after defeating IM Senthil Maran K in the eighth round of the Baku Open. Later that month, at the RadnickiChess May IM tournament in Belgrade, he scored his third and final IM norm and became the youngest international master in history, at the age of 10 years, 3 months, and 21 days. In doing so, he broke Faustino Oro's record of 10 years, 8 months, and 16 days.

In 2025, it was reported that the Russian Chess Federation had provided Shogdzhiev with a team of seven grandmaster coaches, led by Evgeny Tomashevsky. Leonard Barden has drawn comparisons between Shogdzhiev and Garry Kasparov.

=== Grandmaster norms ===
In June 2026, Shogdzhiev became the youngest player in chess history to achieve a grandmaster norm. He scored 6/9 at the Asian Individual Chess Championship in Ulaanbaatar, Mongolia, remaining undefeated against six grandmasters and securing his first GM norm at the age of 11 years, 4 months, and 1 day. This broke the previous record, held by the Ukrainian grandmaster Illia Nyzhnyk since 2008, by approximately two and a half months.

Shogdzhiev scored his second GM norm in October 2026, while playing on board one for Partizan Belgrade in the Serbian Super League.

== Personal life ==
Shogdzhiev was born on 4 February 2015 in Elista, the capital of the Republic of Kalmykia, a constituent republic of the Russian Federation. He was taught chess by his father when he was four years old, and his mother gave up work in order to homeschool him. He lives with his parents in Moscow.
