= Jutta Hempel =

German chess player

Jutta Hempel (born September 27, 1960, in Flensburg) is a German chess prodigy who retired from competitive chess as a young adult.

== Chess career ==
Hempel showed remarkable aptitude for the game at a young age - by age three she could watch a game of chess and replay it from memory, and by age four she was playing competitively at the Youth Center in Flensburg. By the age of five, Hempel was the top junior player in Flensburg. On her sixth birthday, Hempel performed the impressive feat of scoring 9.5-2.5 in a four-hour simultaneous exhibition. In her next simultaneous exhibition, which took place in the town square, Hempel won with a decisive 9-1 score. Hempel won the Flensburg junior championship at age seven. She also played six games of simultaneous blindfold chess. When she was eight years old, Hempel continued to give simultaneous exhibitions, some of which were broadcast on television. At the age of nine, Hempel managed to win a chess problem solving contest. Perhaps her most impressive accomplishment was her two draws against International Master Jens Enevoldsen at age 9.

== Personal life ==
As an adult, Hempel attended business school in Kiel and worked for a bank for a time. She married in 1986 and declined to pursue a career in chess.
