= Tomas Sosa =

Argentine chess grandmaster (born 1998)

Personal information
- Born: September 9, 1998 (age 27) Buenos Aires, Argentina

Chess career
- Country: Argentina
- Title: Grandmaster (2022)
- FIDE rating: 2546 (July 2026)
- Peak rating: 2575 (May 2024)

Tomas Sosa (born September 9, 1998) is an Argentine chess grandmaster.

== Chess career ==
In September 2019, he won the blitz tournament held during the Ciutat de Barcelona Masters. He finished in 9th place in the main event and was the highest-ranking IM.

In December 2020, he won the La Palma IM tournament, scoring 7.5/9 and finishing 1.5 points ahead of the runner-up.

He was awarded the Grandmaster title in 2022.

In 2023, he was the Iberoamerican Rapid Champion.

He has served as one of the coaches for Argentine prodigy Faustino Oro.

In April 2025, he finished in 4th place at the Menorca Open, ranking ahead of Andy Woodward, Edgar Mamedov, and Sam Shankland on tiebreaks.
