= Alexei Gavrilov (chess player) =

Russian chess grandmaster (born 1960)

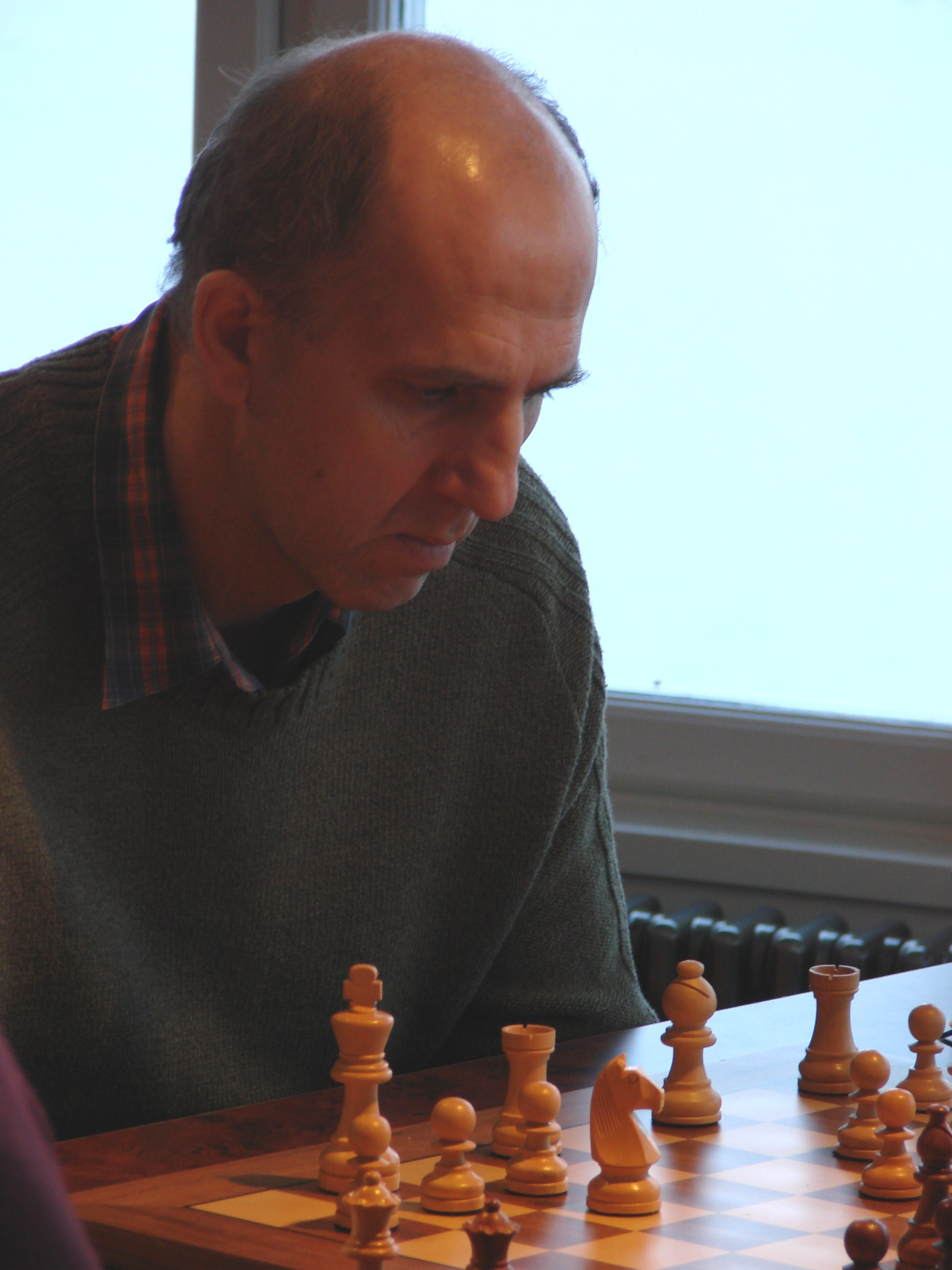
- Alexei Gavrilov in Stockholm, 2010

Personal information
- Born: October 20, 1960 (age 66) Moscow, Soviet Union

Chess career
- Country: Soviet Union; Russia
- Title: Grandmaster (2010)
- Peak rating: 2512 (July 2007)

Alexei Olegovich Gavrilov (Russian: Алексей Олегович Гаврилов; born 20 October 1960) is a Russian chess Grandmaster (2010).

== Chess career ==
Gavrilov began achieving his first notable chess successes in the late 1980s. In 1989, he tied for second place in Moscow behind Andrei Shchekachev, alongside Mikhail Perelshteyn. In 1992, he achieved the greatest success of his career by winning the gold medal at the first individual Russian Chess Championship held after the dissolution of the Soviet Union, which took place in Oryol. Later that same year, he won another tournament outright in Moscow.

In 1995, he tied for fourth place (behind Sergei Movsesian, Róbert Tibenský, and Artur Kogan) at the Slovak International Championship in Trenčín, while in 1996 he shared first place with Babakuli Annakov in Moscow. In 2001, he earned his first Grandmaster norm at the open tournament in Pardubice and also shared first place with Rufat Bagirov at the F. Pripis Memorial in Moscow. In 2004, he tied for first place in the Proclient Cup in Olomouc. In 2005, he fulfilled his second Grandmaster norm during the Russian Championship semi-final in Kazan.

In 2006, Gavrilov won the Summer IM A Inline tournament in Olomouc and the V Cerrado Escuela tournament in Pontevedra. In 2008, he won in Eforie and shared first place with Andrey Zontakh in Lipetsk. In 2009, he won a World Chess Tour event in Moscow, earning his third and final norm for the Grandmaster title, and in 2010 he shared first place with Maxim Turov in Eforie. At the turn of 2011 and 2012, he jointly won the annual Cracovia tournament in Kraków alongside Jacek Tomczak.

He reached his peak career rating of 2512 on 1 July 2007, ranking 116th among Russian players at the time.
