= Jean-Noël Riff =

French chess grandmaster (born 1981)

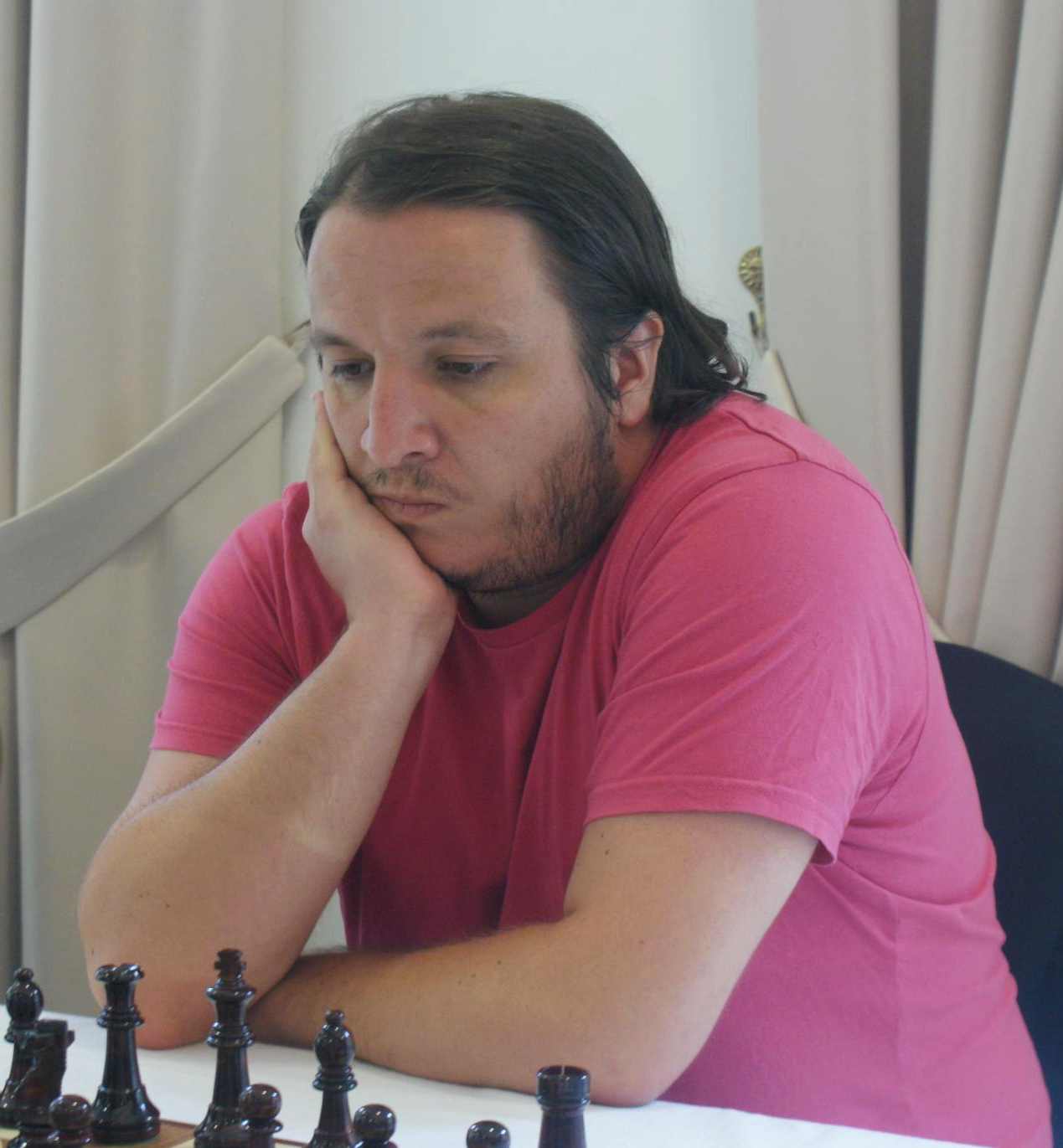
- Riff in 2013

Personal information
- Born: April 22, 1981 (age 45) Mulhouse, France

Chess career
- Country: France
- Title: Grandmaster (2014)
- FIDE rating: 2418 (July 2026)
- Peak rating: 2520 (January 2009)

Jean-Noël Riff is a French chess grandmaster.

== Chess career ==
Riff earned his GM norms at the:

- Mulhouse International GM Festival in June 2008
- 24th Touquet Grand Prix in October 2009
- Interclubs Adultes in Saint-Quentin, June 2014

In October 2009, he became the champion of the Touquet International Open, where he drew against Sahaj Grover, who became India's youngest International Master.

In August 2014, he finished second in the Trophée BNP Paribas tournament, behind winner Yannick Gozzoli.

In January 2017, he held a draw against former FIDE World Champion Veselin Topalov at the Gibraltar Masters.
