= Ethan Pang =

English chess player (born 2015)

Personal information
- Born: 20 March 2015 (age 11) London, England
- Education: Westminster Under School

Chess career
- Country: England
- Title: FIDE Master (2024)
- FIDE rating: 2182 (June 2026)
- Peak rating: 2303 (November 2024)

Ethan Pang (born 20 March 2015) is an English chess player.

== Chess career ==
He began playing chess at the age of 5 during COVID lockdowns. At the age of 7, he was chosen to represent England at the European Youth Chess Championship 2022.

In June 2024, he became the youngest player to achieve a FIDE rating of 2200, doing so at a tournament in Newmarket, Suffolk. This earned him the Candidate Master title. This record has since been broken by Luca Protopopescu.

In September 2024, he won three successive games against grandmasters Milan Pacher, Attila Czebe, and Zoltán Varga in the Vezerkepzo IM tournament.

In November 2024, he broke Faustino Oro's record for youngest player to surpass 2300 rating at a second Vezérképző IM tournament. This also earned him the FIDE Master title.

== Personal life ==
He attends the Westminster Under School.
