= Chess prodigy =

Young child with an aptitude for the game of chess

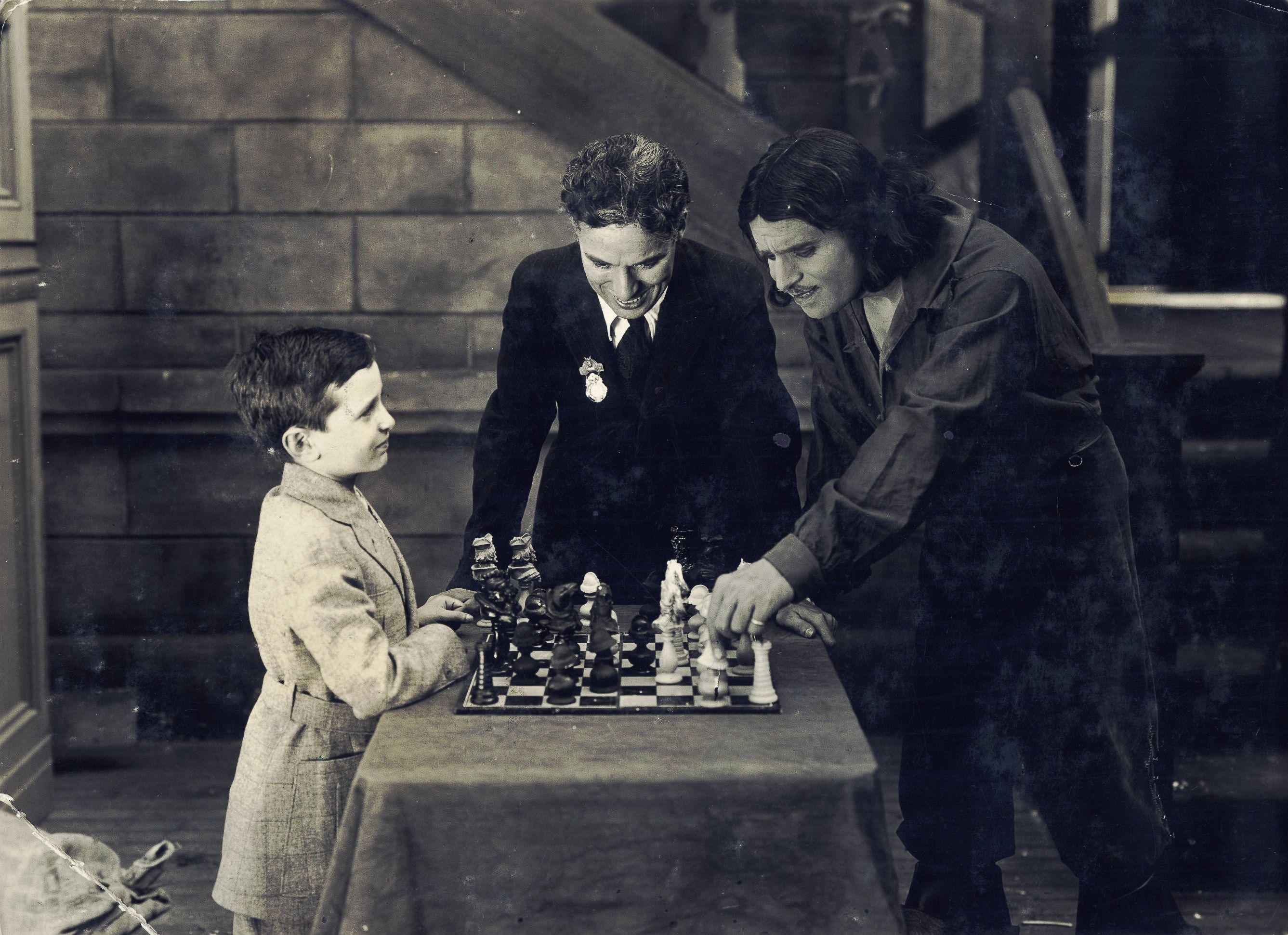
Samuel Reshevsky playing chess with Douglas Fairbanks, as Charlie Chaplin watches them during filming of the American silent film The Three Musketeers, 1921

A chess prodigy is a young child who possesses an aptitude for chess that far exceeds what might be expected at their age. Their prodigious talent will often enable them to defeat experienced adult players and even titled chess masters. Some chess prodigies have progressed to become grandmasters or even World Chess Champions.

In 1950, FIDE introduced the titles of international master (IM) and grandmaster (GM). One measure of chess prodigies is the age at which they earn each of these titles. In the below tables, the ages listed are the ages at which a player qualified for a title. This is not equal to the age at which they officially earned the title, because GM and IM titles can only be awarded at FIDE congresses. The country listed indicates the federation the player was affiliated with at the time of gaining the title, not their current or later affiliation.

== Early chess prodigies ==
Early chess prodigies included Paul Morphy (1837–1884) and José Raúl Capablanca (1888–1942), both of whom won matches against strong adult opponents at the age of 12, and Samuel Reshevsky (1911–1992), who gave simultaneous exhibitions at the age of six. Morphy went on to become the world's leading player before the formal World Champion title existed. Capablanca became the third World Champion, and Reshevsky, while never becoming World Champion, was among the world's elite players for many decades.

Arturo Pomar (1931–2016) was another to be labelled a prodigy by chess writers. He played his first international tournament (Madrid 1943) at the age of 11 and went on to become Spain's first grandmaster.

Jutta Hempel (born 1960) at the age of 6 played 12 simultaneous games and won 9.5-2.5.

== Youngest to beat a grandmaster ==
There is often widespread attention when a young player defeats a grandmaster (GM), especially in a FIDE-rated classical game.

=== Classical ===
Below are the youngest players to defeat a GM in a FIDE classical-rated game, as of February 2024. Bolded players went on to became a grandmaster.

#	Year	Player	Elo	Age	Opponent	Elo
1	2024	Ashwath Kaushik (SIN)	1892	8 years, 6 months, 11 day	Jacek Stopa (POL)	2351
2	2024	Leonid Ivanovic (SER)	1865	8 years, 11 months, 7 days	Milko Popchev (BUL)	2193
3	2012	**Awonder Liang** (USA)	1832	9 years, 3 months, 20 days	Larry Kaufman (USA)	2406
4	2011	Hetul Shah (IND)	1817	9 years, 6 months	Nurlan Ibrayev (KAZ)	2407
5	2014	**Nodirbek Abdusattorov** (UZB)	2057	9 years, 7 months, 27 days	Andrey Zhigalko (BLR)	2600
6	2022	Aaron Reeve Mendes (CAN)	1970	9 years, 10 months, 0 days	Razvan Preotu (CAN)	2445
7	2019	**Abhimanyu Mishra** (USA)	2120	9 years, 10 months, 28 days	James Tarjan (USA)	2402
8	2023	**Faustino Oro** (ARG)	2325	10 years, 0 months, 0 days	Federico Perez Ponsa (ARG)	2527
9	2017	**Marc'Andria Maurizzi** (FRA)	1841	10 years, 1 month, 17 days	Fabien Libiszewski (FRA)	2542
10	2015	**Vincent Keymer** (GER)	2371	10 years, 2 months, 30 days	Alexandr Karpatchev (RUS)	2472
11	2016	**R Praggnanandhaa** (IND)	2339	10 years, 5 months, 9 days	R. R Laxman (IND)	2435
12	2018	**Bharath Subramaniyam** (IND)	2196	10 years, 7 months, 17 days	Deepan Chakkravarthy (IND)	2531

Abdusattorov is the youngest player to defeat a GM rated over 2500, defeating 2600-rated Andrey Zhigalko at the age of 9 years, 7 months, and 27 days.

=== Speed Chess ===
Including FIDE-rated rapid and blitz games, Roman Shogdzhiev from Russia defeated grandmasters Jakhongir Vakhidov and Johan-Sebastian Christiansen in the World Rapid Championship 2023, and after a couple of days defeated GMs Kirill Shevchenko, Alan Pichot and Pranav V in the World Blitz Championship 2023. He was 8 years, 10 months, and 22-26 days at the time.

== Youngest international master ==
In general, the IM title is awarded to players who achieve a FIDE rating of at least 2400 and three IM norms, which are tournament results with a performance rating of at least 2450 over 9 or more games. Below are the eleven youngest players to earn the IM title. Players in bold have or have had a published FIDE rating of at least 2700.

#	Player	Age	Born	Earned
1	Roman Shogdzhiev (RUS)	10 years, 3 months, 25 days	4 Feb 2015	25 May 2025
2	Faustino Oro (ARG) (Note: Oro earned the IM title under newer regulations that require at least one norm to come from an open tournament.)	10 years, 8 months, 6 days	14 Oct 2013	30 Jun 2024
3	Abhimanyu Mishra (USA)	10 years, 9 months, 3 days	5 Feb 2009	8 Nov 2019
4	**R Praggnanandhaa** (IND)	10 years, 9 months, 19 days	10 Aug 2005	29 May 2016
5	**Yağız Kaan Erdoğmuş** (TUR)	11 years, 1 month, 20 days	3 Jun 2011	23 Jul 2022
6	**Javokhir Sindarov** (UZB)	11 years, 6 months, 16 days	8 Dec 2005	24 Jun 2017
7	Bodhana Sivanandan (UK)	11 years, 7 months, 16 days	7 March 2015	23 October 2026
8	Bharath Subramaniyam (IND)	11 years, 8 months, 8 days	17 Oct 2007	25 Jun 2019
9	**Gukesh Dommaraju** (IND)	11 years, 9 months, 9 days	29 May 2006	10 Mar 2018
10	**Sergey Karjakin** (UKR) (Note: Karjakin switched federations to Russia after earning the GM title.)	11 years, 11 months	12 Jan 1990	12 Dec 2001
11	**Nodirbek Abdusattorov** (UZB)	12 years, 1 day	18 Sep 2004	19 Sep 2016
12	Andy Woodward (USA)	12 years, 1 month, 1 day	2 May 2010	3 Jun 2022

The current record-holder is Roman Shogdzhiev, who qualified for the title at age 10 years, 3 months, and 25 days in 2025.

== Youngest to earn grandmaster norm ==
In general, a player earns a grandmaster norm when they achieve a tournament result with a performance rating of at least 2600 over 9 or more games, subject to conditions on the average rating and federations of their opponents. Below are the 10 youngest players to earn a grandmaster norm. Players in bold are or have been ranked in the top ten of a published FIDE rating list.

#	Player	Age	Born	Earned
1	Roman Shogdzhiev (RUS)	11 years, 122 days	4 Feb 2015	Jun 2026
2	Illya Nyzhnyk (UKR)	11 years, 134 days	27 Sep 1996	Apr 2008
3	**Gukesh Dommaraju** (IND)	11 years, 324 days	29 May 2006	Apr 2018
4	Faustino Oro (ARG)	11 years, 340 days	14 Oct 2013	Sep 2025
5	**Sergey Karjakin** (UKR) (Note: Karjakin switched federations to Russia after earning the GM title.)	12 years, 29 days	12 Jan 1990	Feb 2002
6	**Nodirbek Abdusattorov** (UZB)	12 years, 36 days	18 Sep 2004	Oct 2016
7	Abhimanyu Mishra (USA)	12 years, 86 days	5 Feb 2009	Apr 2021
8	**R Praggnanandhaa** (IND)	12 years, 106 days	10 Aug 2005	Nov 2017
9	**Javokhir Sindarov** (UZB)	12 years, 194 days	8 Dec 2005	Jun 2018
10	**Yağız Kaan Erdoğmuş** (TUR)	12 years, 230 days	3 Jun 2011	Dec 2023

The youngest player to earn a GM norm is Roman Shogdzhiev of Russia, who earned his first GM norm at the age of 11 years and 122 days in June 2026. He scored 6/9 at the Asian Individual Championship 2026, breaking Illya Nyzhnyk's 18-year-old record by over two months.

== Youngest grandmaster ==
=== List of record-holders ===
Below are players who have held the record for the youngest grandmaster. The first record holder was David Bronstein, who was the youngest of the 27 inaugural players to be awarded the title by FIDE in 1950 at age 26. The requirements for earning the GM title have changed over time. In the present system, the title is awarded to players who achieve a FIDE rating of at least 2500 and three GM norms. The current record-holder is Abhimanyu Mishra of the United States, who qualified for the title at age 12 years, 4 months, and 25 days in 2021.

Year	Player	Age
1950	David Bronstein (USSR)	26 years
1952	Tigran Petrosian (USSR)	23 years
1955	Boris Spassky (USSR)	18 years
1958	Bobby Fischer (USA)	15 years, 6 months, 1 day
1991	Judit Polgar (HUN)	15 years, 4 months, 28 days
1994	Peter Leko (HUN)	14 years, 4 months, 22 days
1997	Étienne Bacrot (FRA)	14 years, 2 months, 0 days
1997	Ruslan Ponomariov (UKR)	14 years, 0 months, 17 days
1999	Bu Xiangzhi (CHN)	13 years, 10 months, 13 days
2002	Sergey Karjakin (UKR)	12 years, 7 months, 0 days
2021	Abhimanyu Mishra (USA)	12 years, 4 months, 25 days

=== Grandmasters younger than 14 years old ===
Below is a list of the players who fulfilled the requirements to attain the GM title before their 14th birthday, ranked by the age that they earned the title. Players in bold are or have been ranked in the top ten of a published FIDE rating list.

#	Player	Age	Born	Earned
1	Abhimanyu Mishra (USA)	12 years, 4 months, 25 days	2009	2021
2	Faustino Oro (ARG) (Note: Oro earned the GM title under newer regulations that require at least one norm to come from an open tournament.)	12 years, 6 months, 26 days	2013	2026
3	**Sergey Karjakin** (UKR) (Note: Karjakin switched federations to Russia after earning the GM title.)	12 years, 7 months, 0 days	1990	2003
4	**Gukesh Dommaraju** (IND)	12 years, 7 months, 17 days	2006	2019
5	Yağız Kaan Erdoğmuş (TUR)	12 years, 9 months, 29 days	2011	2024
6	**Javokhir Sindarov** (UZB)	12 years, 10 months, 8 days	2005	2018
7	**R Praggnanandhaa** (IND)	12 years, 10 months, 13 days	2005	2018
8	**Nodirbek Abdusattorov** (UZB)	13 years, 1 month, 11 days	2004	2018
9	Parimarjan Negi (IND)	13 years, 4 months, 22 days	1993	2006
10	**Magnus Carlsen** (NOR)	13 years, 4 months, 27 days	1990	2004
11	Ivan Zemlyanskii (RUS)	13 years, 8 months, 21 days	2010	2024
12	**Wei Yi** (CHN)	13 years, 8 months, 23 days	1999	2013
13	Andy Woodward (USA)	13 years, 8 months, 28 days	2010	2024
14	Raunak Sadhwani (IND)	13 years, 9 months, 28 days	2005	2020
15	Bu Xiangzhi (CHN)	13 years, 10 months, 13 days	1985	1999
16	Samuel Sevian (USA)	13 years, 10 months, 27 days	2000	2014
17	**Richárd Rapport** (HUN)	13 years, 11 months, 6 days	1996	2010

=== List of female record-holders ===
Below are the holders of the record for the youngest female player to earn the grandmaster title, not to be confused with the Woman Grandmaster title.

Year	Player	Country	Age
1978	Nona Gaprindashvili	Soviet Union	37 years
1984	Maia Chiburdanidze	Soviet Union	23 years
1991	Susan Polgar	Hungary	21 years
1991	Judit Polgár	Hungary	15 years, 4 months
2002	Koneru Humpy	India	15 years, 1 month
2008	Hou Yifan	China	14 years, 6 months

Judit Polgár was also the youngest overall player to qualify for the grandmaster title when she did so.

== Youngest super grandmaster ==
"Super grandmaster" is an informal term that is widely used in chess circles to refer to players with an Elo rating of over 2700. Below are the 11 youngest players to establish a FIDE rating of 2700. Players in bold have become World Champion.

#	Player	Age	Born	Date
1	Yağız Kaan Erdoğmuş (TUR)	14 years, 10 months, 28 days	2011	Apr 2026
2	Wei Yi (CHN)	15 years, 8 months, 27 days	1999	Mar 2015
3	Alireza Firouzja (IRN) (Note: Firouzja changed his federation to France after earning the GM title.)	16 years, 1 month, 16 days	2003	Aug 2019
4	**Gukesh Dommaraju** (IND)	16 years, 3 months, 3 days	2006	Sep 2022
5	**Magnus Carlsen** (NOR)	16 years, 7 months, 1 day	1990	Jul 2007
6	Anish Giri (NED)	17 years, 0 months, 4 days	1994	Jul 2011
7	Vincent Keymer (GER)	17 years, 10 months, 16 days	2004	Oct 2022
8	Maxime Vachier-Lagrave (FRA)	17 years, 11 months, 10 days	1990	Oct 2008
9	Nodirbek Abdusattorov (UZB)	17 years, 11 months, 14 days	2004	Sep 2022
10	Sergey Karjakin (UKR) (Note: Karjakin switched federations to Russia after earning the GM title.)	17 years, 11 months, 20 days	1990	Jan 2008
11	R Praggnanandhaa (IND)	17 years, 11 months, 20 days	2005	Aug 2023

The current record-holder is Yağız Kaan Erdoğmuş of Turkey at the age of 14 years, 10 months, and 28 days. In April 2026, he defeated former World Champion Veselin Topalov 5–1 in the "Clash of Generations III" match to reach a live rating of 2709.4.
