= Pierre Laurent-Paoli =

French chess grandmaster (born 2000)

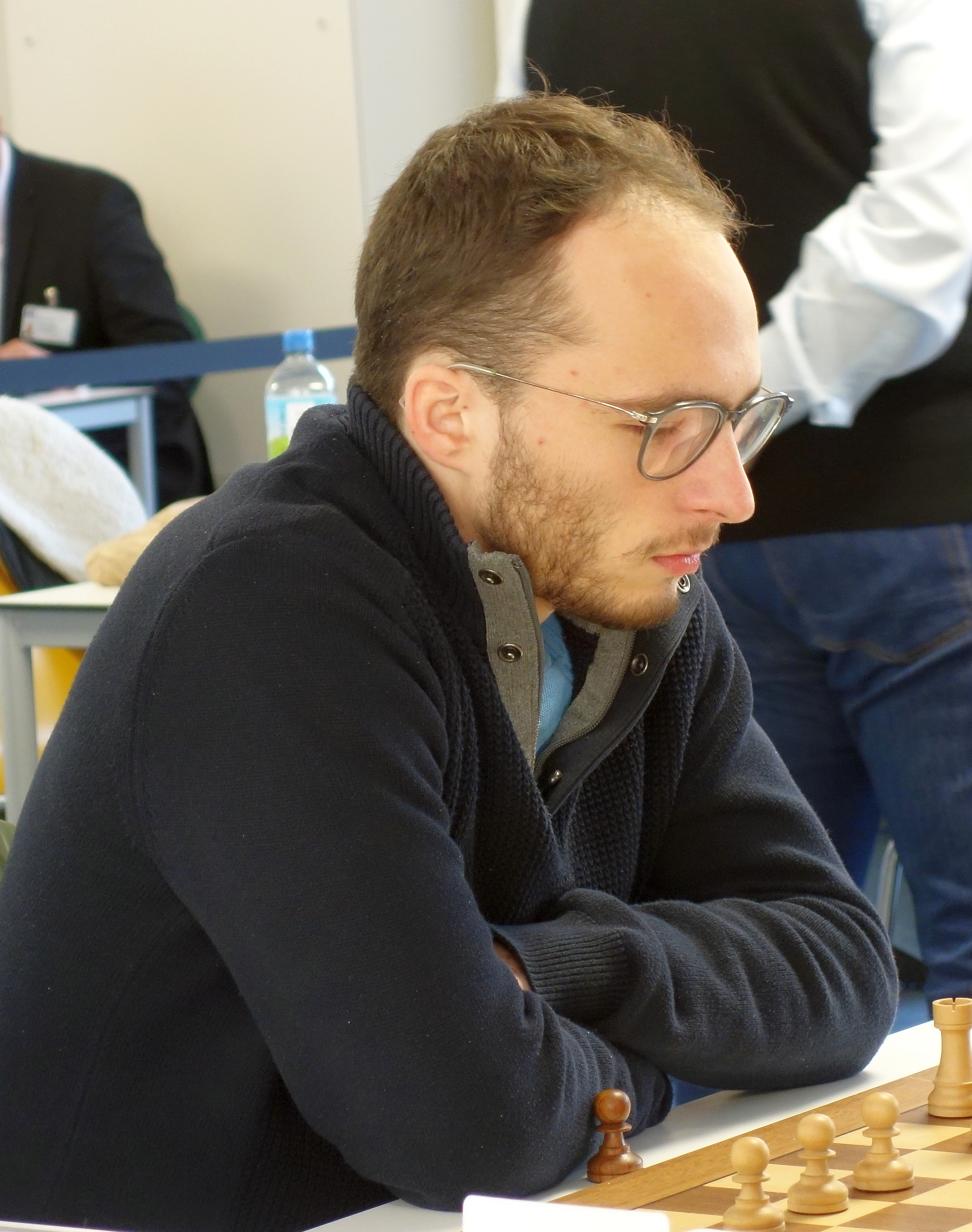

Personal information
- Born: December 3, 2000 (age 25) Montpellier, France

Chess career
- Country: France
- Title: Grandmaster (2023)
- FIDE rating: 2536 (July 2026)
- Peak rating: 2583 (November 2024)

Pierre Laurent-Paoli is a French chess grandmaster.

== Chess career ==
In December 2021, he tied for first place in the Vandoeuvre Open with grandmasters Deep Sengupta, Sergey Fedorchuk, and Marc'Andria Maurizzi. He was ranked in third place after tiebreaks.

He earned the Grandmaster title in 2023.

In July 2024, he tied for second place in the Aix-en-Provence Dole Trophy International A Tournament with Abhimanyu Puranik, Maxime Lagarde, and Bharath Subramaniyam. He took second place after tiebreaks.

In August 2024, he finished in fourth place in the French Chess Championships after losing the third-place match to Romain Édouard.
