= Andrey Zontakh =

Ukrainian chess grandmaster (born 1970)

Personal information
- Native name: Андрій Зонтах
- Born: November 4, 1970 (age 56) Kyiv, Ukrainian SSR, Soviet Union

Chess career
- Country: Ukraine
- Title: Grandmaster (1997)
- FIDE rating: 2471 (November 2026)
- Peak rating: 2582 (July 2008)

Andrey Rudolfovich Zontakh (Ukrainian: Андрій Зонтах; born 4 November 1970) is a Ukrainian chess Grandmaster and coach.

== Career ==
Zontakh began competing in international tournaments after the dissolution of the Soviet Union. In 1993, he achieved early success by sharing first place at a round-robin tournament in Belgrade alongside Marat Makarov, Dragutin Šahović, and Goran Arsović. In 1994, he won in Šaľa (tied with Vitali Golod and Gennadi Timoshchenko). He also shared first place at the Werfen Open in 1994 and 1995, and won in Požarevac in 1995 (tied with Viktor Komliakov). On the 1 January 1996 FIDE rating list, Zontakh entered the top 100 players in the world, ranking tied for 93rd–109th.

In the late 1990s, Zontakh also began working as a chess trainer; his students have included Sanan Sjugirov.

His peak Elo rating was 2582 in July 2008, when he was ranked 18th among Ukrainian players.

=== Tournament results ===
- 1993: Tied for 1st place in Belgrade.
- 1994: Tied for 1st place in Šaľa; tied for 1st place at the Werfen Open.
- 1995: Tied for 1st place in Požarevac; tied for 1st place at the Werfen Open.
- 1997: 1st place in Tivat.
- 1998: 1st place in Belgrade.
- 1999: 1st place in Kőszeg; tied for 1st place at the Igor Platonov Memorial in Kyiv; won the First Saturday FS04 GM and FS06 GM tournaments in Budapest.
- 2001: Tied for 1st place in Kyiv with Vadim Malakhatko.
- 2002/03: Tied for 1st place at the Cracovia Open in Kraków with Oleksandr Zubarev, Sergei Fedorchuk, and Krzysztof Jakubowski.
- 2004: Tied for 1st place in Basel with Attila Czebe, Trajcze Nedev, and Csaba Balogh.
- 2007, 2008, 2010: 1st place in Lipetsk (tied with Alexei Gavrilov in 2008).
- 2007, 2008, 2010: 1st place in Kyiv (tied with Oleksandr Kovchan in 2008 and Spartak Vysochin in 2010).
