= Romain Édouard =

French chess grandmaster (born 1990)

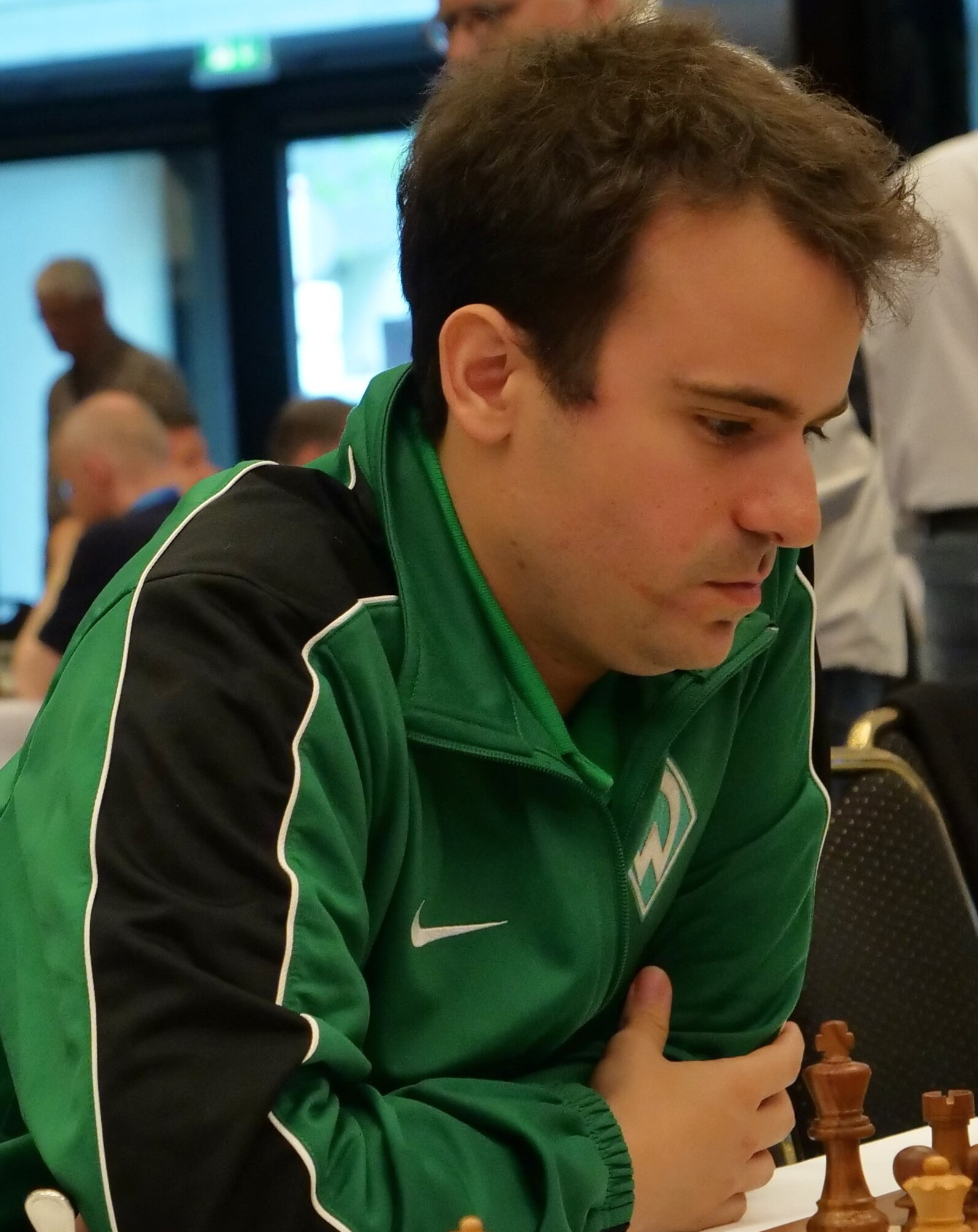
- Édouard in 2018

Personal information
- Born: 28 November 1990 (age 35) Poitiers, France

Chess career
- Country: France
- Title: Grandmaster (2009)
- FIDE rating: 2554 (July 2026)
- Peak rating: 2702 (June 2014)
- Peak ranking: No. 44 (June 2014)

Romain Édouard (born 28 November 1990) is a French chess grandmaster.

Born in Poitiers, Édouard has been playing chess since the age of five, and joined his first tournament in 2001. He was trained by fellow French Grandmaster Olivier Renet during his adolescence. He won the 2006 European Youth Chess Championship U16 category at the age of 15, and in 2007 earned his International Master title.

== Career ==
Amongst open tournaments, he won at Zaragoza 2008, Bad Wiessee 2008, Andorra 2009, Echternach 2009 and 2010, Hastings 2009/10 and Clermont-Ferrand 2011. There have also been victories in closed events, at Grand Prix de Bordeaux 2007, Antwerp 2011 and Nancy 2012. In August 2012, Édouard jointly won the French Chess Championship alongside Christian Bauer, Maxime Vachier-Lagrave and Etienne Bacrot. In December of the same year, he won the Al Ain Classic tournament edging out Vachier-Lagrave on tiebreaks. Édouard took part in the Grandmaster Group B of the Tata Steel Chess Tournament 2013 in Wijk aan Zee finishing sixth out of fourteen participants with a score of 7/13 points. In 2014 he won the Dubai Open scoring 8/9, a full point ahead of the field. Édouard tied for first in the 2015 World Open, held in Arlington. In July 2015, he won the 3rd AIDEF Chess Championship (French-speaking countries chess championship) in Montreal. He tied for first in the 2018 French Chess Championship with Tigran Gharamian and Yannick Gozzoli. Gharamian won the playoff.

Édouard has played for the French national team at the Chess Olympiads of 2010, 2012 and 2014, and at the European Team Chess Championships of 2009, 2013 and 2015. In the 2013 event he won the team silver medal and the individual gold on board three.

== Books ==
- Edouard, Romain (2014). The Chess Manual of Avoidable Mistakes. Thinkers Publishing. ISBN 978-9082256611.
- Edouard, Romain (2015). The Chess Manual of Avoidable Mistakes. Part 2: Test yourself!. Thinkers Publishing. ISBN 9789082256642.
