= Arthur Pijpers =

Dutch chess grandmaster (born 1994)

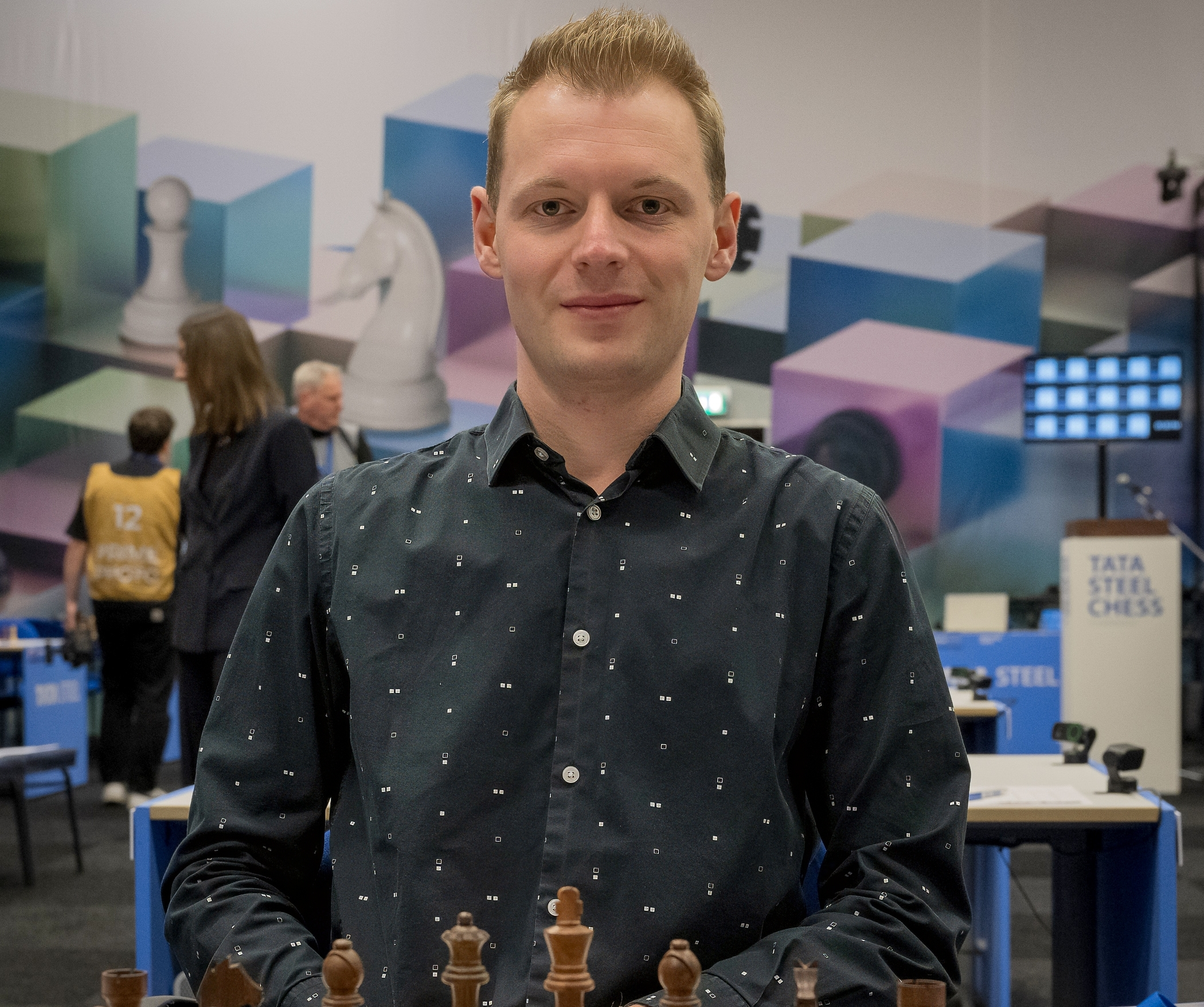
- Pijpers in 2025

Personal information
- Born: May 19, 1994 (age 32) Leiden, Netherlands

Chess career
- Country: Netherlands
- Title: Grandmaster (2025)
- FIDE rating: 2486 (July 2026)
- Peak rating: 2500 (July 2025)

Arthur Pijpers (born May 19, 1994) is a Dutch chess grandmaster.

== Chess career ==
In April 2015, he played in the Neckar Open, where he drew a game against super-grandmaster Étienne Bacrot in the final round despite not yet being an IM. This earned him his first GM norm.

In January 2024, he won the Tienkamp section of the Tata Steel Chess Tournament, qualifying to play in the Challengers section in 2025.

In April 2024, he earned his final GM norm at the Dutch Team Chess Competition. In September 2025, he was awarded the FIDE Grandmaster title after achieving the minimum required Elo rating of 2500.
