= Joseph Girel =

French chess grandmaster (born 2004)

Personal information
- Born: November 15, 2004 (age 21) Marseille, France

Chess career
- Country: France
- Title: Grandmaster (2024)
- FIDE rating: 2503 (August 2026)
- Peak rating: 2508 (September 2026)

Joseph Girel is a French chess grandmaster.

== Chess career ==
Girel has been a French U18 Champion in 2022, and French U20 Champion both in 2023 and 2024. He has also been National Collegiate Champion ("Champion de France universitaire") in 2023 as well as French U20 Blitz champion in 2023.

He has won La Plagne's Open in 2023, where he gained his first GM norm. He gained his second GM Norm at the Agde Grand Prix Open in 2023, where he ranked 4th. He gained his last GM norm at the Riga Technical University Open 2024.

In August 2023, he finished tied for third place with Floryan Eugene in the Creon Open Main. He was ranked third after tiebreaks.

In March 2024, he finished second in the early Titled Tuesday tournament after drawing against Hikaru Nakamura in the final round.
