= Yannick Gozzoli =

French chess grandmaster (born 1983)

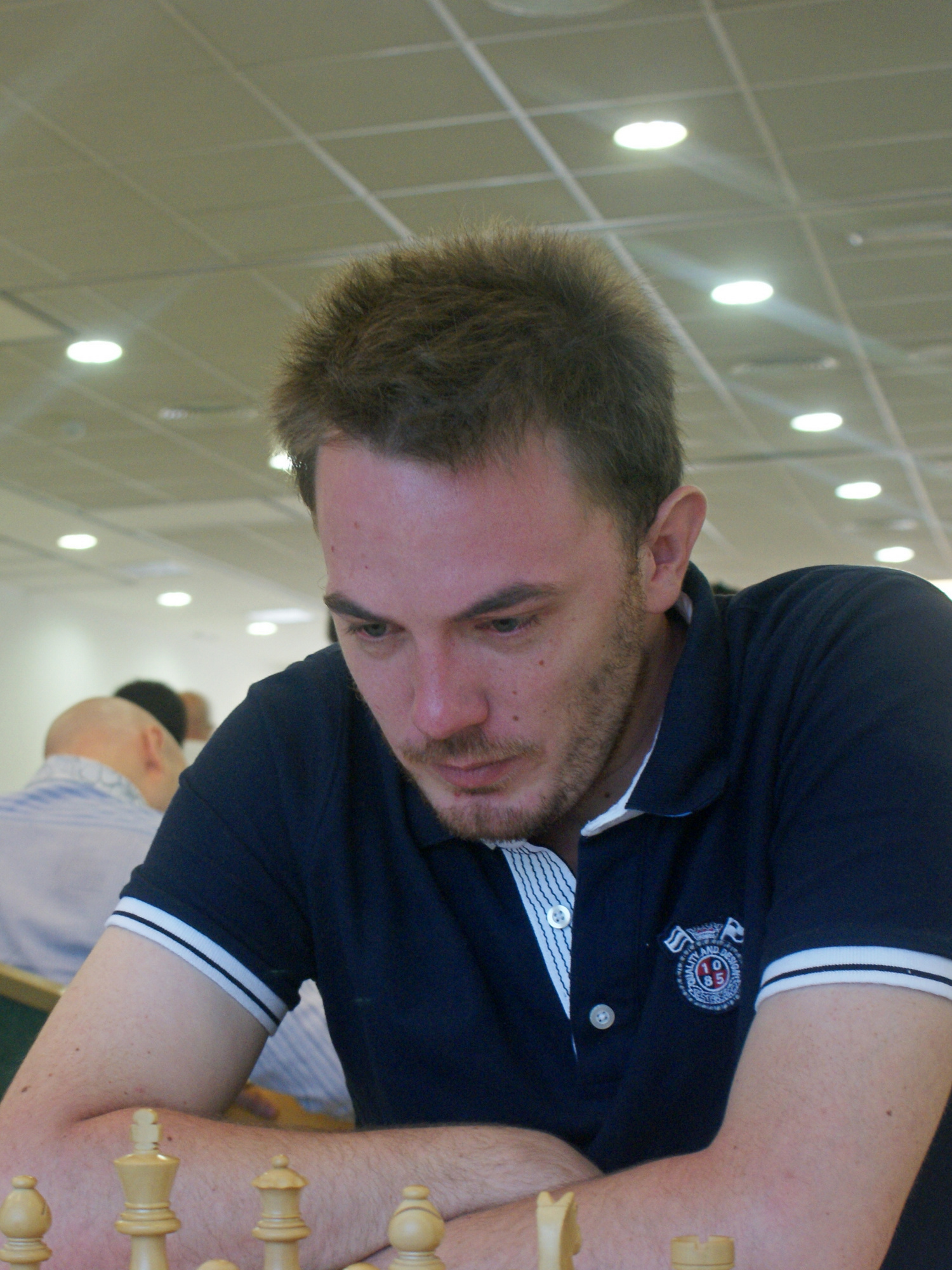
- Gozzoli in 2014

Personal information
- Born: 2 June 1983 (age 43) Marseille, France

Chess career
- Country: France
- Title: Grandmaster (2012)
- FIDE rating: 2543 (July 2026)
- Peak rating: 2633 (March 2019)

Yannick Gozzoli (born 2 June 1983) is a French chess grandmaster.

== Chess career ==
Born in 1983 in Marseille, Gozzoli earned his international master title in 2003 and his grandmaster title in 2012. He is the No. 9 ranked French player as of August 2018. He tied for first in the 2018 French Chess Championship with Tigran Gharamian and Romain Édouard. Gharamian won the playoff.
