= Jacek Stopa =

Polish chess grandmaster (born 1987)

Personal information
- Born: January 3, 1987 (age 39) Wrocław, Poland

Chess career
- Country: Poland
- Title: Grandmaster (2015)
- Peak rating: 2544 (March 2015)

Jacek Stopa (born 3 January 1987 in Wrocław) is a Polish chess Grandmaster.

== Chess career ==
He is a three-time gold medalist of the Polish Junior Championships: under 12 (1999, Wisła), under 18 (2005, Łeba) and under 20 (2006, Środa Wlkp.). In addition, in 2005 in Środa Wlkp. he won a bronze medal in the under 20 category. In 2004, he shared the first place (together with Zigurds Lanka) in the grandmaster tournament in Legnica. A year later, he won (before, among others, Monika Soćko, Bartłomiej Heberla and Aleksander Miśta) in the open tournament in Rybnik and achieved the greatest success in his career, winning the bronze medal at the U18 World Junior Championships in Belfort. (after Julio Becerra Rivero, together with Jesse Kraai) in the open tournament in Coamo. In 2009, he achieved further successes, twice dividing the 1st place in open tournaments in Philadelphia (together with Alex Lenderman) and Indianapolis (together with Alex Lenderman, Sergey Kudrin, Alexei Jermoliński, Dmitry Gurevich and Jesse Kraai). In 2014, he shared the 1st place in Rethymno (together with Zbigniew Pakleza and Alberto David) and Cologne (together with Vadim Malakhatko) and shared the 2nd place in Bratto (behind Zbigniew Pakleza, together with Evgeny Sveshnikov and Alberto David). In 2014, he shared the first place (together with Milos Perunović) in Berlin, and in 2015 he won the Khazar International Open tournament in Rashta.

Stopa is also successful in solving chess problems. In this discipline, he won the title of European Junior Champion in 2005, and in 2006 he was ranked 3rd in Europe in the junior category and 6th in the world in the senior category. He was also a member of the Polish national team that won the bronze medal at the European Team Championships. He achieved another success in 2007, winning the title of European Junior Champion in Pardubice.

He achieved the highest ranking in his career on March 1, 2015, with a rating of 2544, and was ranked #19 in Poland.
