= Mert Erdoğdu =

Turkish chess grandmaster (born 1979)

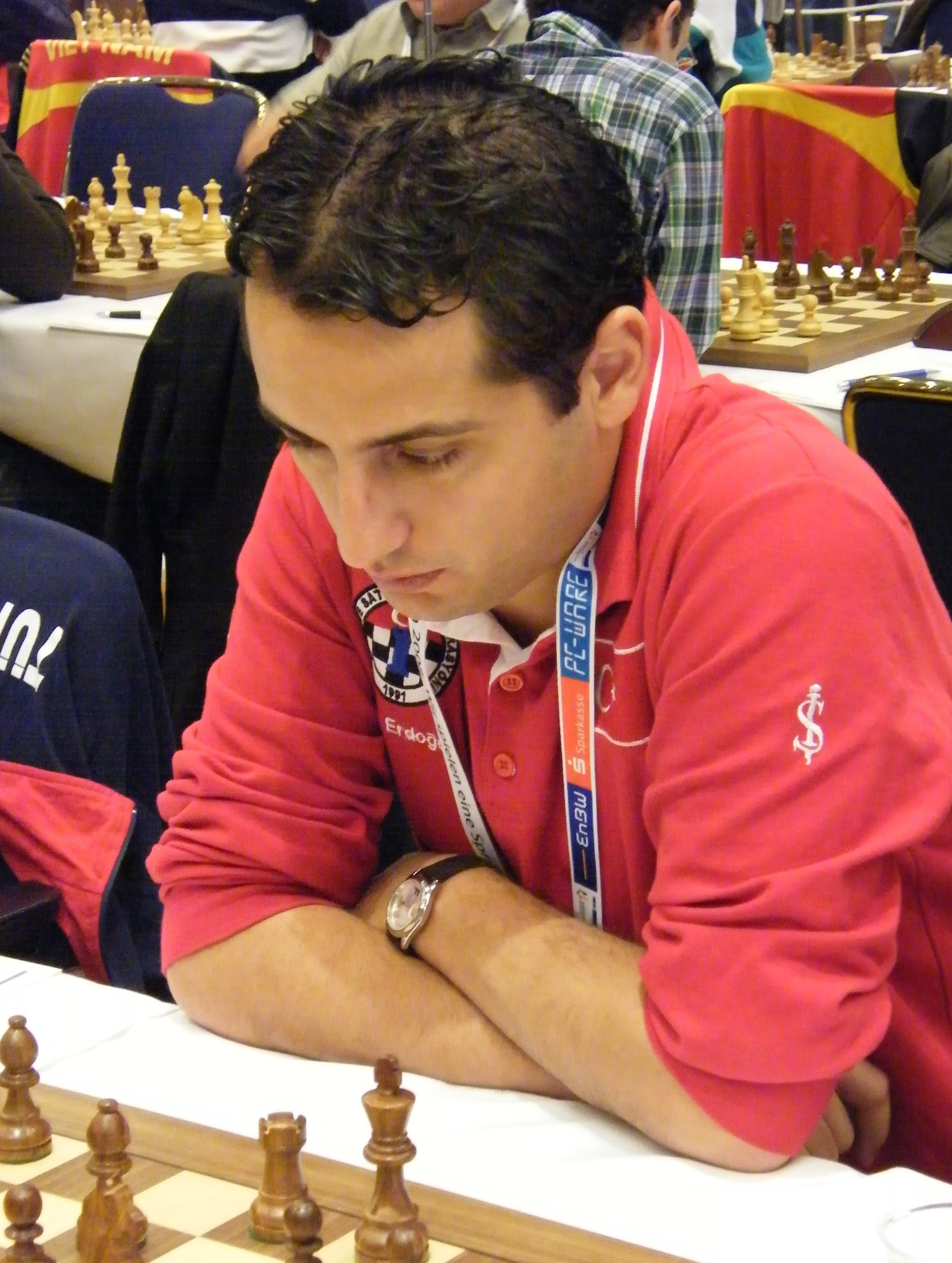
- Mert Erdoğdu in 2008

Personal information
- Born: 30 March 1979 (age 47) İzmit, Turkey

Chess career
- Title: Grandmaster (2017)
- Peak rating: 2513 (January 2010)

Mert Erdoğdu (born 30 March 1979 in İzmit) is a Turkish chess player with the FIDE title of Grandmaster. He is the 2016 Turkish Chess Champion.

== Biography ==
Mert Erdoğdu was born on 30 March 1979 in İzmit. He started playing chess while studying at Galatasaray High School. He earned FIDE titles as FIDE Master (FM) in 2001, International Master (IM) in 2003 and Grand Master (GM) in 2017. He is the thirteenth player to become a grandmaster in Turkish chess history. He competed in the Turkish national team at the Chess Olympiad between 2000 and 2010. Erdoğdu won the 2016 Turkish Chess Championship held in Kocaeli.

In 2018, Erdoğdu was appointed by FIDE as the trainer of the El Salvador Women's National Team in the 1600–1800 Elo category at the 43rd Chess Olympiad.

== Achievements ==
- 2nd Mediterranean Individual Championship – Champion
- 2016 – Turkish Chess Championship – Champion
