= Andrey Zhigalko =

Belarusian chess grandmaster (born 1985)

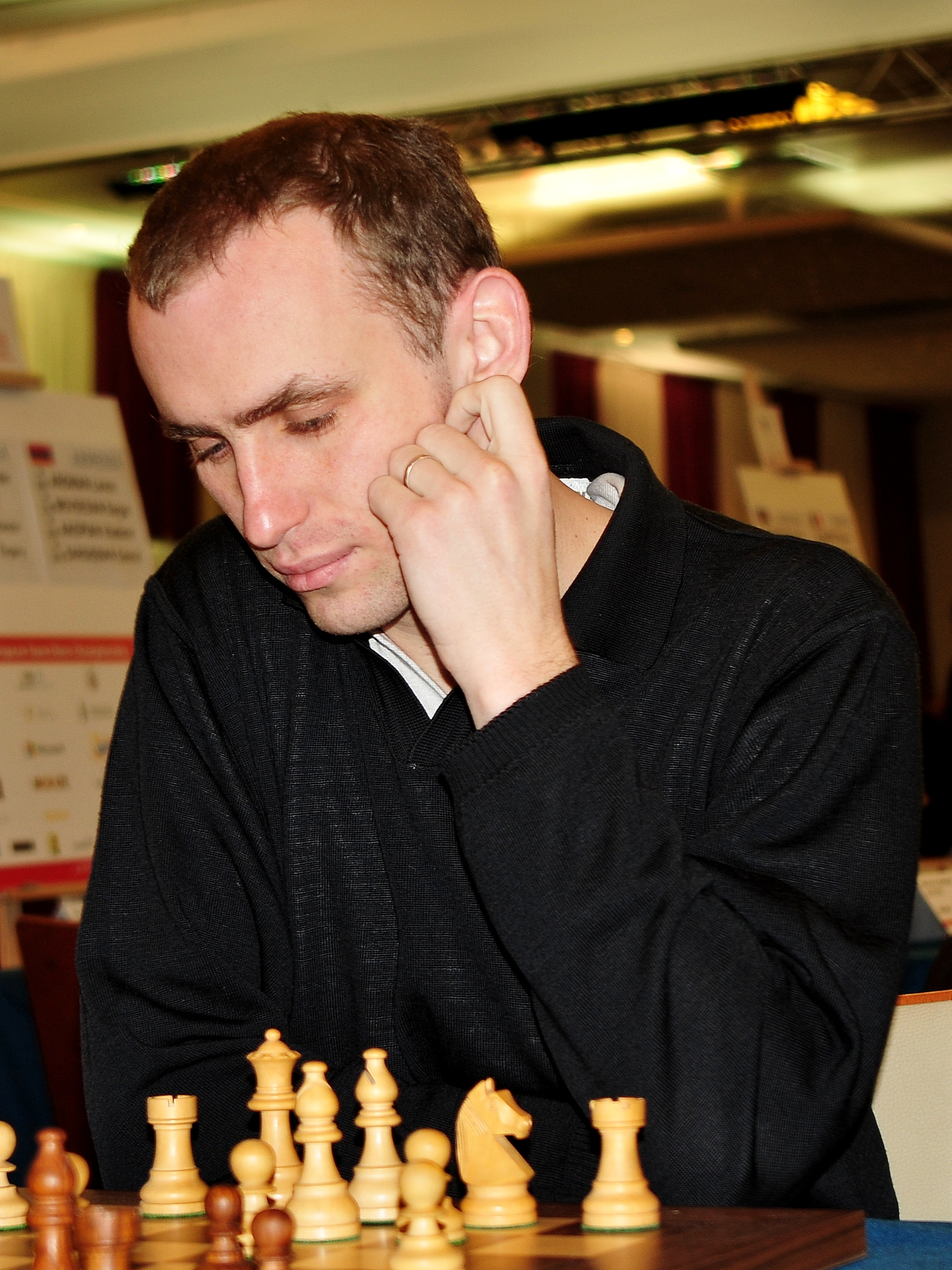
- Zhigalko in 2013

Personal information
- Born: September 18, 1985 (age 40) Minsk, Belarusian SSR, Soviet Union

Chess career
- Country: Belarus
- Title: Grandmaster (2006)
- FIDE rating: 2509 (July 2026)
- Peak rating: 2628 (December 2013)

Andrey Alexandrovich Zhigalko is a Belarusian chess grandmaster.

== Chess career ==
He played for Belarus in all Chess Olympiads from 2004 to 2014.

He achieved the Grandmaster title in 2006, earning his norms at the:

- European Club Cup in September 2001
- European Club Cup in October 2003
- European Club Cup in October 2004

In May 2014, he was defeated by rising prodigy Nodirbek Abdusattorov in the Agzamov Memorial Tournament.

In June 2017, he finished in third place at the 10th Karen Asrian Memorial, behind winner Haik M. Martirosyan and runner-up Tigran Kotanjian.

== Notable game ==
Zhigalko vs. Zarubitski, Chelyabinsk 2021

Position: a8 black rook, b8 black knight, f8 black rook, h8 black king, a7 black pawn, b7 black pawn, d7 black bishop, g7 black pawn, h7 black pawn, c6 black pawn, e6 white bishop, f5 black pawn, g5 white knight, a4 white pawn, b4 black bishop, d4 black queen, b2 white pawn, e2 white queen, f2 white pawn, g2 white pawn, h2 white pawn, a1 white rook, c1 white bishop, f1 white king, h1 white rook

After 14... Kh8, Zhigalko played 15.h4!!

In January 2021, he played a notable game against Viachaslau Zarubitski in the Lozovatsky Memorial tournament, which was featured on Azerbaijani news with annotation by Vasif Durarbayli.

== Personal life ==
His younger brother is grandmaster Sergei Zhigalko.
