= Attila Czebe =

Hungarian chess grandmaster (born 1975)

Personal information
- Born: December 26, 1975 (age 50) Budapest, Hungary

Chess career
- Country: Hungary
- Title: Grandmaster (2003)
- Peak rating: 2526 (July 2011)

Attila Czebe is a Hungarian chess grandmaster.

== Chess career ==
In April 2012, he won the Historical Melaka International Chess Championship with a score of 7.5/9, which was 1.5 points higher than the runners-up.

In January 2016, he played in the Delhi Open, where he tied for first place with Ivan Popov and Valeriy Neverov, but was ranked in second due to tiebreaks.

In 2021, he co-organized the Vezerkepzo tournament, which is a recurring monthly tournament in Budapest in which players can compete to obtain norms.
