= Faustino Oro =

Argentine chess grandmaster (born 2013)

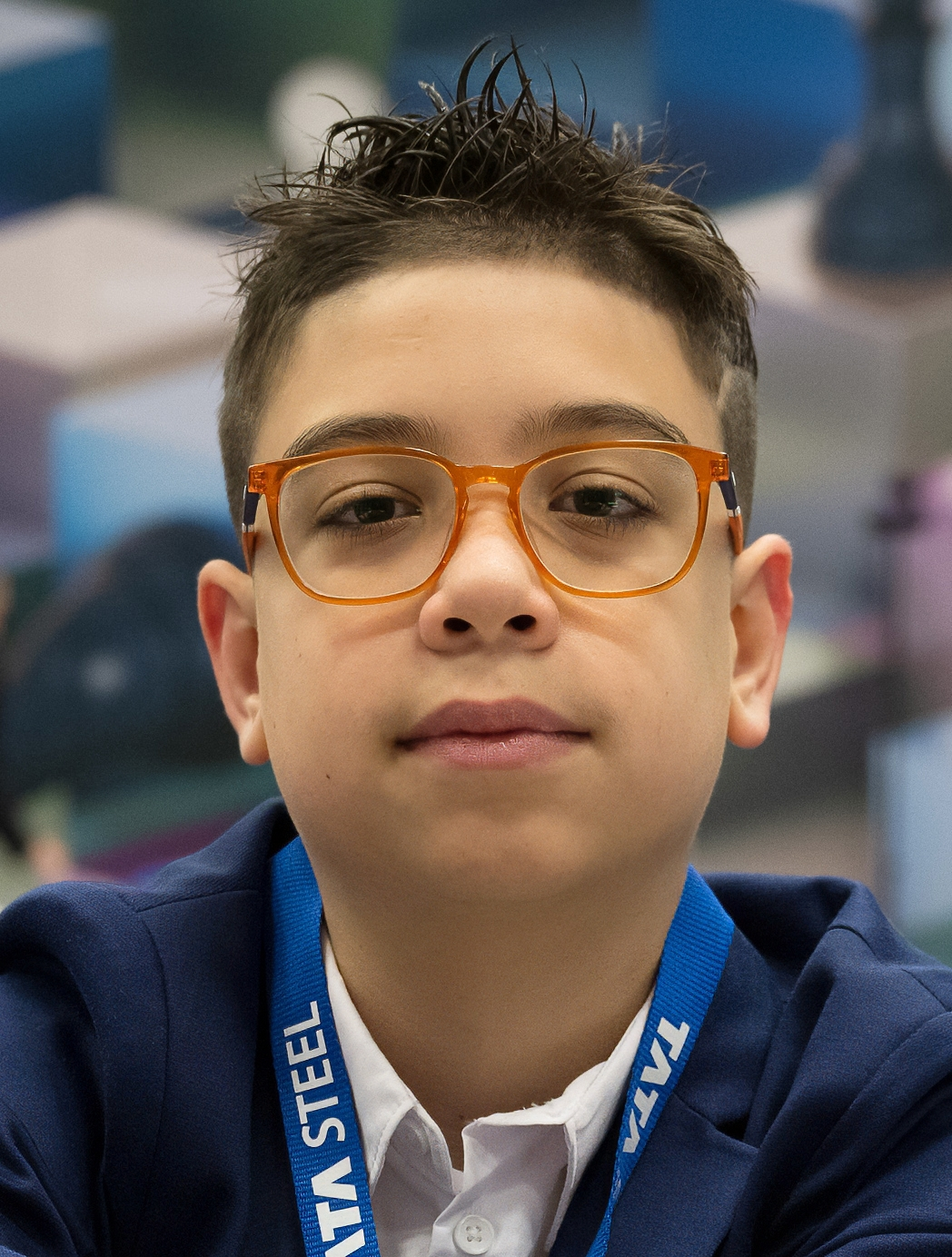
- Oro in 2025

Personal information
- Born: October 14, 2013 (age 13) Buenos Aires, Argentina

Chess career
- Country: Argentina
- Title: Grandmaster (2026)
- FIDE rating: 2554 (November 2026)
- Peak rating: 2560 (October 2026)

Faustino Oro (born October 14, 2013) is an Argentine chess prodigy and grandmaster.

== Career ==
In 2023, when Oro was nine, he received a rating of 2300 (classical), becoming the youngest chess player to have done so at the time. This record was broken in November 2024 by Ethan Pang. He was also the youngest player to attain a norm for the IM title. This record was broken in January 2025 by Roman Shogdzhiev.

Oro has been dubbed the "Messi of chess," or "Chessi".

In May 2024, Oro defeated 5-time world champion and world #1 ranked Magnus Carlsen in an online bullet chess game.

He held the world record for the youngest International Master, a title which he earned in June 2024 at the age of 10 years, 8 months, and 16 days. The record was broken by Roman Shogdzhiev in May 2025 at the age of 10 years, 3 months, and 21 days.

Players normally require three "norms" to achieve the title of Grandmaster. In September 2025, Oro earned his first grandmaster norm at the Legends and Prodigies 2025 tournament in Madrid, Spain, becoming the third youngest player to ever score a GM norm, after Illia Nyzhnyk and Gukesh Dommaraju. His performance rating in the event was 2759. In the next rating list (1 October, 2025) he became the youngest player ever, and the first 11-year-old, to reach a rating of 2500.

In November 2025, at the Chess World Cup 2025, Oro won his first round match, defeating Grandmaster Ante Brkić 5-3, to become the youngest player ever to win a match at the Chess World Cup. In the second round, Oro was eliminated by losing 2.5-1.5 to Vidit Gujrathi in tiebreaks, after drawing both classical games and the first rapid game.

In December 2025, Oro achieved his second GM norm at the Magistral Szmetan-Giardelli in Buenos Aires, finishing with a score of 5.5/9. Oro achieved a performance rating of 2608 for the tournament, gaining 13 rating points.

At the age of 12 years, 6 months, and 26 days, Faustino Oro earned his third required GM norm at the Sardinia International Chess Festival in May 2026, becoming the second-youngest player to ever qualify for the title of Grandmaster.
