= World Youth Chess Championship =

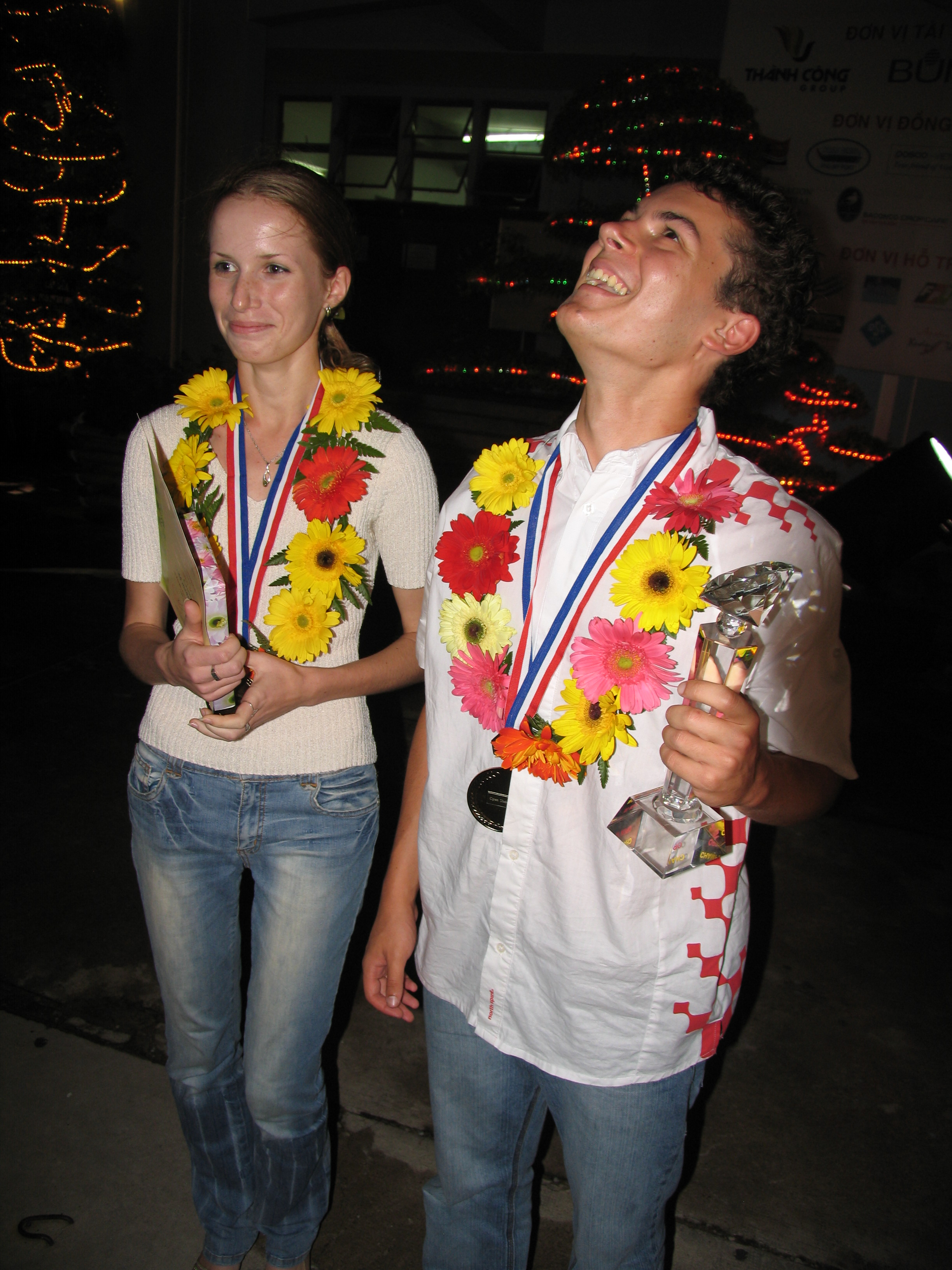
Valentina Golubenko and Ivan Šarić won Under-18 titles in 2008.

The World Youth Chess Championship is a FIDE-organized worldwide chess competition for boys and girls under the age of 8, 10, 12, 14, 16 and 18.

== History ==
Twelve world champions are crowned every year. Since 2015 (OR 2016), the event has been split into "World Cadets Chess Championship" (categories U8, U10 and U12) and "World Youth Chess Championship" (categories U14, U16 and U18).

The championship is usually held in a single city, although on several occasions, the Under-16 championship was separated from the Under-18 championship (in 1990, 1991, 1995, and 1997). In 1988, the U18 championship was held in Aguadilla, and the others in Timișoara.

The Under-16 (Cadet) category is the oldest of the championships. It was unofficially created in 1974 in France for players under 17 and was recognized in 1977 (or 1976) by the International Chess Federation as the World Cadet Championship. The maximum age was later reduced to under 16, effective 1 January of the year of the championship. The first FIDE-sanctioned women's championship was held in 1981.

The under-14 championship was inaugurated in 1979, and the under-eight championship in 2006.

== Ages ==
1. U18: Since 1987
2. U16: Cadets 1974 - 1980 / Since 1981
3. U14: World Infant Cup 1979-1984 / Since 1985
4. U12: Since 1986
5. U10: Since 1986
6. U08: Since 2006

== Editions ==
=== Standard (Classic) ===
#	Year	Type	Host country	Events
Unofficial U18 Boys Cadets
-	1974	U18 B	France	1
-	1975	U18 B	France	1
U17 Boys Cadets
-	1976	U17 B	France	1
-	1977	U17 B	France	1
-	1978	U17 B	Netherlands	1
U17 Boys Cadets + U14 Boys World Infant Cup
-	1979	U17 B + U14 B	France - Mexico	2
-	1980	U17 B + U14 B	France - Mexico	2
U14 Boys World Infant Cup + U16 B / G
-	1981	U14 B + U16 B / G	Argentina - Mexico	3
-	1982	U16 B	Ecuador	1
-	1983	U16 B	Colombia	1
-	1984	U14 B + U16 B / G	Argentina - France	3
World Youth Chess Championship
1	1985	U14 U16	Israel - Argentina	4
2	1986	U10 U12 U14 U16	Puerto Rico - Argentina	8
3	1987	U10 U12 U14 U16 U18	Puerto Rico - Austria	10
4	1988	U10 U12 U14 U16 U18	Romania - Puerto Rico	10
5	1989	U10 U12 U14 U16 U18	Puerto Rico	10
6	1990	U10 U12 U14 U16 U18	Singapore - United States	10
7	1991	U10 U12 U14 U16 U18	Brazil - Poland	10
8	1992	U10 U12 U14 U16 U18	Germany	10
9	1993	U10 U12 U14 U16 U18	Slovakia	10
10	1994	U10 U12 U14 U16 U18	Hungary	10
11	1995	U10 U12 U14 U16 U18	Brazil	10
12	1996	U10 U12 U14 U16 U18	Spain	10
13	1997	U10 U12 U14 U16 U18	Armenia - France	10
14	1998	U10 U12 U14 U16 U18	Spain	10
15	1999	U10 U12 U14 U16 U18	Spain	10
16	2000	U10 U12 U14 U16 U18	Spain	10
17	2001	U10 U12 U14 U16 U18	Spain	10
18	2002	U10 U12 U14 U16 U18	Greece	10
19	2003	U10 U12 U14 U16 U18	Greece	10
20	2004	U10 U12 U14 U16 U18	Greece	10
21	2005	U10 U12 U14 U16 U18	France	10
22	2006	U08 U10 U12 U14 U16 U18	Georgia	12
23	2007	U08 U10 U12 U14 U16 U18	Turkey	12
24	2008	U08 U10 U12 U14 U16 U18	Vietnam	12
25	2009	U08 U10 U12 U14 U16 U18	Turkey	12
26	2010	U08 U10 U12 U14 U16 U18	Greece	12
27	2011	U08 U10 U12 U14 U16 U18	Brazil	12
28	2012	U08 U10 U12 U14 U16 U18	Slovenia	12
29	2013	U08 U10 U12 U14 U16 U18	United Arab Emirates	12
30	2014	U08 U10 U12 U14 U16 U18	South Africa	12
31	2015	U08 U10 U12 U14 U16 U18	Greece	12
World Cadets Chess Championship (U08 U10 U12) + World Youth Chess Championship (U14, U16 and U18)
32	2016	U08 U10 U12 U14 U16 U18	Russia - Georgia	12
33	2017	U08 U10 U12 U14 U16 U18	Uruguay - Brazil	12
34	2018	U08 U10 U12 U14 U16 U18	Spain - Greece	12
35	2019	U08 U10 U12 U14 U16 U18	India - China	12
36	2020	U08 U10 U12 U14 U16 U18	Not held	0
37	2021	U08 U10 U12 U14 U16 U18	Not held	0
38	2022	U08 U10 U12 U14 U16 U18	Romania - Georgia	12
39	2023	U08 U10 U12 U14 U16 U18	Egypt - Italy	12
40	2024	U08 U10 U12 U14 U16 U18	Italy - Brazil	12
41	2025	U08 U10 U12 U14 U16 U18	Kazakhstan - Albania	12
42	2026	U08 U10 U12 U14 U16 U18	Georgia - Italy	12

=== Rapid & Blitz ===
Since 2017 World Youth Rapid and Blitz Chess Championship (FIDE World Cadet & Youth Rapid & Blitz Championships)

1st FIDE World Cadets Rapid & Blitz Chess Championships 2017, Minsk, Belarus, 1 - 5 June.

=== Cadets ===
1. World Cadets Rapid & Blitz Chess Championships 2017, Minsk, Belarus
2. World Cadets Rapid & Blitz Chess Championships 2018, Minsk, Belarus
3. World Cadets Rapid & Blitz Chess Championships 2019, Minsk, Belarus
4. World Cadets Rapid & Blitz Chess Championships 2020, Online
5. World Cadets Rapid & Blitz Chess Championships 2021, Online
6. World Cadets & Youth Rapid & Blitz Chess Championships 2022, Rhodes, Greece
7. World Cadets & Youth Rapid & Blitz Chess Championships 2023, Batumi, Georgia
8. World Cadets Rapid & Blitz Chess Championships 2024, Durres, Albania
9. World Cadets & Youth Rapid & Blitz Chess Championship 2025, Rhodes, Greece
10. World Cadets & Youth Rapid & Blitz Chess Championship 2026, Banja, Serbia

=== Youth ===
1. World Youth Rapid & Blitz Chess Championship 2017, Crete, Greece
2. World Youth Rapid & Blitz Chess Championship 2018, Halkidiki, Greece
3. World Youth Rapid & Blitz Chess Championship 2019, Salobreña, Granada, Spain
4. World Youth Rapid & Blitz Chess Championships 2020, Online
5. World Youth Rapid & Blitz Chess Championships 2021, Online
6. World Cadets & Youth Rapid & Blitz Chess Championships 2022, Rhodes, Greece
7. World Cadets & Youth Rapid & Blitz Chess Championships 2023, Batumi, Georgia
8. World Youth Rapid & Blitz Chess Championship 2024, Terme Čatež, Slovenia
9. World Cadets & Youth Rapid & Blitz Chess Championship 2025, Rhodes, Greece
10. World Cadets & Youth Rapid & Blitz Chess Championship 2026, Banja, Serbia

== World Youth U16 Chess Olympiads (Youth Team) ==
2001-2017:

World Youth U16 Chess Olympiads

(World Youth Y16 Olympiad | Children's Olympiads )

no. host city year 1st 2nd 3rd system boards teams players games PGN

FIDE World Youth U16 Chess Olympiad 2025 Barranquilla, Colombia

2024 not held

FIDE Word Youth U16 Chess Olympiad 2023 Eindhoven, the Netherlands

FIDE Word Youth U16 Chess Olympiad 2022 Nakhchivan, Azerbaijan

2021 not held

FIDE Word Youth U16 Chess Olympiad 2019 Corum, Turkey

FIDE Word Youth U16 Chess Olympiad 2018 Konya, Turkey

16. Ahmedabad View tournament crosstable India 2017 RUS IND IRI S-9 4 30 147 508 PGN

15. Poprad View tournament crosstable Slovakia 2016 IRI RUS ARM S-9 4 54 261 972 PGN

14. Ulaanbaatar View tournament crosstable Mongolia 2015 IRI IND RUS S-10 4 35 165 680 PGN

13. Győr View tournament crosstable Hungary 2014 IND RUS IRI S-10 4 54 256 1,076 PGN

12. Chongqing View tournament crosstable China 2013 IND RUS TUR S-10 4 72 332 1,440 PGN

11. Istanbul View tournament crosstable Turkey 2012 RUS IRI IND S-10 4 39 189 760 PGN

10. Kocaeli View tournament crosstable Turkey 2011 RUS ARM IRI S-10 4 26 120 520 PGN

9. Burdur View tournament crosstable Turkey 2010 ARM IND RUS S-10 4 22 99 440 PGN

8. Akhisar View tournament crosstable Turkey 2009 RUS IND ARM S-10 4 22 101 440 PGN

7. Mersin View tournament crosstable Turkey 2008 IND RUS PHI S-10 4 26 117 520 PGN

6. Singapore View tournament crosstable Singapore 2007 IND HUN PHI S-10 4 34 151 680 PGN

5. Ağrı View tournament crosstable Turkey 2006 UKR GEO CHN S-10 4 24 107 480 PGN

- Chennai India 2005 Cancelled.

4. Calicut View tournament crosstable India 2004 CHN HUN UZB S-9 4 20 91 360 PGN

3. Denizili View tournament crosstable Turkey 2003 HUN UKR IRI S-10 4 24 113 448 PGN

2. Kuala Lumpur View tournament crosstable Malaysia 2002 CHN UKR INA S-10 4 28 131 560 PGN

1. Batatais View tournament crosstable Brazil 2001 SWE BRA RSA RR 4 8 38 112 PGN

- Viborg View tournament crosstable Denmark 1979 ENG SWE SCO PO+4S+4Q 4 16 79 224 PGN

1993-2007:

Children's Chess Olympiads

(World Youth Y16 Olympiad | Children's Olympiads )

no. host city year 1st 2nd 3rd system boards teams players games PGN

8. Artek View tournament crosstable Ukraine 2000 RUS UKR AZE S-9 4 28 132 504 PGN

7. Artek View tournament crosstable Ukraine 1999 UKR GEO CHN S-9 4 30 137 528 PGN

6. Istanbul Turkey 1998 ARM UKR GEO S-9 4 26 N/A ?468 PGN

5. Belgrade Yugoslavia 1997 RUS ROM UKR S-7 4 18 N/A 252 N/A

4. Sutomore Yugoslavia 1996 ROM HUN RUS S-9 4 18 N/A N/A N/A

3. Canaries View tournament crosstable Spain 1995 ISL HUN GEO S-7 4 22 97 308 PGN

2. St. Andrew's Malta 1994 RUS GRE HUN S-7 4 28 N/A N/A PGN

1. Linares Spain 1993 RUS GEO RUS3 S-13 4 28 N/A ?728 PGN

International Children's Chess Games (organized by Mr. Bjelica) no. host city year 1st 2nd 3rd

system boards teams players games PGN

12. Novi Sad Serbia 2007 HUN SRB SVK S-9 ind. 24 85 378 PGN

11. Novi Sad Serbia 2006 TUR SRB ROM VOJ S-9 ind. 24 102 444 PGN

10. Novi Sad Serbia & Montenegro 2005 RUS SCG ROM S-9 ind. 23 88 383 PGN

9. Banja Luka Bosnia & Herzegovina 2003 RUS 2 11

1.-8. From Linares 1993 to Artek 2000.

== Under-18 winners ==
Year	Location	Boys	Girls
1987	San Juan (Puerto Rico)	Gustavo Hernández (Dominican Republic)	Hulda Figueroa (Puerto Rico)
1988	Aguadilla (Puerto Rico)	Michael Hennigan (England)	Amelia Hernández (Venezuela)
1989	Aguadilla (Puerto Rico)	Vladimir Akopian (Soviet Union)	Katrin Aladjova (Bulgaria)
1990	Singapore (Singapore)	Sergei Tiviakov (Soviet Union)	Elena-Luminița Cosma (Romania)
1991	Guarapuava (Brazil)	Vladimir Kramnik (Soviet Union)	Nataša Strižak (Yugoslavia)
1992	Duisburg (Germany)	Konstantin Sakaev (Russia)	Ilaha Kadimova (Azerbaijan)
1993	Bratislava (Slovakia)	Zoltán Almási (Hungary)	Ilaha Kadimova (Azerbaijan)
1994	Szeged (Hungary)	Peter Svidler (Russia)	Inna Gaponenko (Ukraine)
1995	Guarapuava (Brazil)	Robert Kempiński (Poland)	Corina Peptan (Romania)
1996	Cala Galdana (Spain)	Rafael Leitão (Brazil)	Marta Zielińska (Poland)
1997	Yerevan (Armenia)	Ruslan Ponomariov (Ukraine)	Rusudan Goletiani (Georgia)
1998	Oropesa del Mar (Spain)	Nicholas Pert (England)	Ruth Sheldon (England)
1999	Oropesa del Mar (Spain)	Dmitry Kokarev (Russia)	Aarthie Ramaswamy (India)
2000	Oropesa del Mar (Spain)	Francisco Vallejo Pons (Spain)	Zeinab Mamedyarova (Azerbaijan)
2001	Oropesa del Mar (Spain)	Dmitry Jakovenko (Russia)	Sopio Gvetadze (Georgia)
2002	Heraklio (Greece)	Ferenc Berkes (Hungary)	Elisabeth Pähtz (Germany)
2003	Halkidiki (Greece)	Shakhriyar Mamedyarov (Azerbaijan)	Nana Dzagnidze (Georgia)
2004	Heraklio (Greece)	Radosław Wojtaszek (Poland)	Jolanta Zawadzka (Poland)
2005	Belfort (France)	Ildar Khairullin (Russia)	Maka Purtseladze (Georgia)
2006	Batumi (Georgia)	Arik Braun (Germany)	Dronavalli Harika (India)
2007	Kemer/Antalya (Turkey)	Ivan Popov (Russia)	Valentina Gunina (Russia)
2008	Vũng Tàu (Vietnam)	Ivan Šarić (Croatia)	Valentina Golubenko (Croatia)
2009	Antalya (Turkey)	Maxim Matlakov (Russia)	Olga Girya (Russia)
2010	Porto Carras (Greece)	Steven Zierk (United States)	Narmin Kazimova (Azerbaijan)
2011	Caldas Novas (Brazil)	Samvel Ter-Sahakyan (Armenia)	Meri Arabidze (Georgia)
2012	Maribor (Slovenia)	Dariusz Świercz (Poland)	Aleksandra Goryachkina (Russia)
2013	Al-Ain (UAE)	Pouya Idani (Iran)	Lidia Tomnikova (Russia)
2014	Durban (South Africa)	Olexandr Bortnyk (Ukraine)	Dinara Saduakassova (Kazakhstan)
2015	Porto Carras (Greece)	Masoud Mosadeghpour (Iran)	M. Mahalakshmi (India)
2016	Khanty-Mansiysk (Russia)	Manuel Petrosyan (Armenia)	Stavroula Tsolakidou (Greece)
2017	Montevideo (Uruguay)	José Eduardo Martínez (Peru)	Laura Unuk (Slovenia)
2018	Halkidiki (Greece)	Viktor Gažík (Slovakia)	Polina Shuvalova (Russia)
2019	Mumbai (India)	Praggnanandhaa R (India)	Polina Shuvalova (Russia)
2020	Online	Nihal Sarin (India)	Carissa Yip (United States)
2021	Online	Nikolaos Spyropoulos (Greece)	Govhar Beydullayeva (Azerbaijan)
2022	Mamaia (Romania)	Shawn Rodrigue-Lemieux (Canada)	Mariam Mkrtchyan (Armenia)
2023	Montesilvano (Italy)	Aleksey Grebnev (FIDE)	Ayan Allahverdiyeva (Azerbaijan)
2024	Florianopolis (Brazil)	Aleksey Grebnev (FIDE)	Olga Karmanova (Russia)
2025	Durrës (Albania)	Siddharth Jagadeesh (Singapore)	Gao Muziyan (China)
2026	Montesilvano (Italy)	Anthony Atanasov (Canada)	Valeria Kleymenova (FIDE)

== Cadets and Under-16 winners ==
=== Unofficial U18 Cadets ===
Year	Location	Boys
1974	Pont St. Maxence (France)	Jonathan Mestel (England)
1975	Creil (France)	David Goodman (England)

=== Official U17 Cadets ===
Year	Location	Boys
1976	Wattignies (France)	Nir Grinberg (Israel)
1977	Cagnes-sur-Mer (France)	Jon Arnason (Iceland)
1978	Sas van Gent (Netherlands)	Paul Motwani (Scotland)
1979	Belfort (France)	Marcelo Javier Tempone (Argentina)
1980	Le Havre (France)	Valery Salov (Soviet Union)

=== Under-16 ===
Year	Location	Boys	Girls
1981	Embalse, Córdoba (Argentina)(†)	Stuart Conquest (England)	Susan Polgar (Hungary)
1982	Guayaquil (Ecuador)	Evgeny Bareev (Soviet Union)	not held
1983	Bucaramanga (Colombia)	Alexey Dreev (Soviet Union)	not held
1984	Champigny-sur-Marne (France)	Alexey Dreev (Soviet Union)	Ildikó Mádl (Hungary)
1985	Petah Tikva (Israel)	Eduardo Rojas Sepulveda (Chile)	Mirjana Marić (Yugoslavia)
1986	Río Gallegos (Argentina)	Vladimir Akopian (Soviet Union)	Katrin Aladjova (Bulgaria)
1987	Innsbruck (Austria)	Hannes Stefánsson (Iceland)	Alisa Galliamova (Soviet Union)
1988	Timișoara (Romania)	Alexei Shirov (Soviet Union)	Alisa Galliamova (Soviet Union)
1989	Aguadilla (Puerto Rico)	Sergei Tiviakov (Soviet Union)	Krystyna Dąbrowska (Poland)
1990	Singapore (Singapore)	Konstantin Sakaev (Soviet Union)	Tea Lanchava (Soviet Union)
1991	Guarapuava (Brazil)	Dharshan Kumaran (England)	Nino Khurtsidze (Soviet Union)
1992	Duisburg (Germany)	Ronen Har-Zvi (Israel)	Almira Skripchenko (Moldova)
1993	Bratislava (Slovakia)	Đào Thiên Hải (Vietnam)	Elina Danielian (Armenia)
1994	Szeged (Hungary)	Peter Leko (Hungary)	Natalia Zhukova (Ukraine)
1995	Guarapuava (Brazil)	Hrvoje Stević (Croatia)	Rusudan Goletiani (Georgia)
1996	Cala Galdana (Spain)	Alik Gershon (Israel)	Anna Zozulia (Ukraine)
1997	Yerevan (Armenia)	Levente Vajda (Romania)	Xu Yuanyuan (China)
1998	Oropesa del Mar (Spain)	Ibragim Khamrakulov (Uzbekistan)	Wang Yu (China)
1999	Oropesa del Mar (Spain)	Leonid Kritz (Germany)	Sopiko Khukhashvili (Georgia)
2000	Oropesa del Mar (Spain)	Zviad Izoria (Georgia)	Sopiko Khukhashvili (Georgia)
2001	Oropesa del Mar (Spain)	Konstantine Shanava (Georgia)	Nana Dzagnidze (Georgia)
2002	Heraklio (Greece)	Levan Pantsulaia (Georgia)	Tamara Chistiakova (Russia)
2003	Halkidiki (Greece)	Borki Predojević (Bosnia and Herzegovina)	Polina Malysheva (Russia)
2004	Heraklio (Greece)	Maxim Rodshtein (Israel)	Bela Khotenashvili (Georgia)
2005	Belfort (France)	Alex Lenderman (United States)	Anna Muzychuk (Slovenia)
2006	Batumi (Georgia)	Jacek Tomczak (Poland)	Sopiko Guramishvili (Georgia)
2007	Kemer/Antalya (Turkey)	Ioan-Cristian Chirilă (Romania)	Keti Tsatsalashvili (Georgia)
2008	Vũng Tàu (Vietnam)	Adhiban Baskaran (India)	Nazí Paikidze (Georgia)
2009	Antalya (Turkey)	S. P. Sethuraman (India)	Deysi Cori (Peru)
2010	Porto Carras (Greece)	Kamil Dragun (Poland)	Nastassia Ziaziulkina (Belarus)
2011	Caldas Novas (Brazil)	Jorge Cori (Peru)	Nastassia Ziaziulkina (Belarus)
2012	Maribor (Slovenia)	Urii Eliseev (Russia)	Anna Styazhkina (Russia)
2013	Al-Ain (UAE)	Murali Karthikeyan (India)	Gu Tianlu (China)
2014	Durban (South Africa)	Alan Pichot (Argentina)	Laura Unuk (Slovenia)
2015	Porto Carras (Greece)	Roven Vogel (Germany)	Stavroula Tsolakidou (Greece)
2016	Khanty-Mansiysk (Russia)	Haik M. Martirosyan (Armenia)	Hagawane Aakanksha (India)
2017	Montevideo (Uruguay)	Andrey Esipenko (Russia)	Annie Wang (United States)
2018	Halkidiki (Greece)	Shant Sargsyan (Armenia)	Annmarie Muetsch (Germany)
2019	Mumbai (India)	Rudik Makarian (Russia)	Leya Garifullina (Russia)
2020	Online	Frederik Svane (Germany)	Rakshitta Ravi (India)
2021	Online	Volodar Murzin (Russia)	Xeniya Balabayeva (Kazakhstan)
2022	Mamaia (Romania)	Pranav Anand (India)	Munkhzul Davaakhuu (Mongolia)
2023	Montesilvano (Italy)	Jakub Seemann (Poland)	Wang Chuqiao (China)
2024	Florianopolis (Brazil)	Javier Habans Aguerrea (Spain)	Afruza Khamdamova (Uzbekistan)
2025	Durrës (Albania)	Edgar Mamedov (Kazakhstan)	Diana Khafizova (Russia)
2026	Montesilvano (Italy)	Khagan Ahmad (Azerbaijan)	Veranika Abramkina (FIDE)

(†) The girls tournament was held separately, in Westergate, England.

== Under-14 winners ==
=== World Infant Cup ===
Year	Location	Boys
1979	Durango (Mexico)	Miroljub Lazić (Yugoslavia)
1980	Mazatlán (Mexico)	Julio Granda (Peru)
1981	Xalapa (Mexico)	Saeed Ahmed Saeed (United Arab Emirates)
1984	Lomas de Zamora (Argentina)	Lluís Comas Fabregó (Spain)

=== Boys & Girls ===
Year	Location	Boys	Girls
1985	Lomas de Zamora (Argentina)	Ilya Gurevich (United States)	Sandra Villegas (Argentina)
1986	San Juan (Puerto Rico)	Joël Lautier (France)	Zsofia Polgar (Hungary)
1987	San Juan (Puerto Rico)	Miroslav Marković (Yugoslavia)	Cathy Haslinger (England)
1988	Timișoara (Romania)	Eran Liss (Israel)	Tea Lanchava (Soviet Union)
1989	Aguadilla (Puerto Rico)	Veselin Topalov (Bulgaria)	Anna Segal (Soviet Union)
1990	Fond du Lac (United States)	Judit Polgár (Hungary)	Diana Darchia (Soviet Union)
1991	Warsaw (Poland)	Marcin Kamiński (Poland)	Corina Peptan (Romania)
1992	Duisburg (Germany)	Jurij Tihonov (Belarus)	Elina Danielian (Armenia)
1993	Bratislava (Slovakia)	Vladimir Malakhov (Russia)	Ruth Sheldon (England)
1994	Szeged (Hungary)	Alik Gershon (Israel)	Rusudan Goletiani (Georgia)
1995	São Lourenço (Brazil)	Valeriane Gaprindashvili (Georgia)	Xu Yuanyuan (China)
1996	Cala Galdana (Spain)	Gabriel Sargissian (Armenia)	Wang Yu (China)
1997	Cannes (France)	Sergey Grigoriants (Russia)	Ana Matnadze (Georgia)
1998	Oropesa del Mar (Spain)	Bu Xiangzhi (China)	Nadezhda Kosintseva (Russia)
1999	Oropesa del Mar (Spain)	Zahar Efimenko (Ukraine)	Zhao Xue (China)
2000	Oropesa del Mar (Spain)	Alexander Areshchenko (Ukraine)	Humpy Koneru (India)
2001	Oropesa del Mar (Spain)	Viktor Erdős (Hungary)	Salome Melia (Georgia)
2002	Heraklio (Greece)	Luka Lenič (Slovenia)	Laura Rogule (Latvia)
2003	Halkidiki (Greece)	Sergei Zhigalko (Belarus)	Valentina Gunina (Russia)
2004	Heraklio (Greece)	Ildar Khairullin (Russia)	Dronavalli Harika (India)
2005	Belfort (France)	Lê Quang Liêm (Vietnam)	Elena Tairova (Russia)
2006	Batumi (Georgia)	Vasif Durarbayli (Azerbaijan)	Klaudia Kulon (Poland)
2007	Kemer/Antalya (Turkey)	Sanan Sjugirov (Russia)	Nazí Paikidze (Georgia)
2008	Vũng Tàu (Vietnam)	Vidit Gujrathi (India)	Padmini Rout (India)
2009	Antalya (Turkey)	Jorge Cori Tello (Perù)	Marsel Efroimski (Israel)
2010	Porto Carras (Greece)	Kanan Izzat (Azerbaijan)	Dinara Saduakassova (Kazakhstan)
2011	Caldas Novas (Brazil)	Kirill Alekseenko (Russia)	Aleksandra Goryachkina (Russia)
2012	Maribor (Slovenia)	Kayden Troff (United States)	M. Mahalakshmi (India)
2013	Al-Ain (UAE)	Li Di (China)	Stavroula Tsolakidou (Greece)
2014	Durban (South Africa)	Liu Yan (China)	Qiyu Zhou (Canada)
2015	Porto Carras (Greece)	Shamsiddin Vokhidov (Uzbekistan)	R. Vaishali (India)
2016	Khanty-Mansiysk (Russia)	Semen Lomasov (Russia)	Zhu Jiner (China)
2017	Montevideo (Uruguay)	Batsuren Dambasuren (Mongolia)	Jishitha D (India)
2018	Halkidiki (Greece)	Pedro Antonio Ginés Esteo (Spain)	Ning Kaiyu (China)
2019	Mumbai (India)	Aydin Suleymanli (Azerbaijan)	Meruert Kamalidenova (Kazakhstan)
2020	Online	Gukesh Dommaraju (India)	Eline Roebers (Netherlands)
2021	Online	Ediz Gürel (Turkey)	Zsóka Gaál (Hungary)
2022	Mamaia (Romania)	Ilamparthi A. R. (India)	Zarina Nurgaliyeva (Kazakhstan)
2023	Montesilvano (Italy)	Pawel Sowinski (Poland)	Afruza Khamdamova (Uzbekistan)
2024	Florianopolis (Brazil)	Patryk Cieslak (Poland)	Diana Khafizova (Russia)
2025	Durrës (Albania)	Mark Smirnov (Kazakhstan)	Polina Smirnova (Russia)
2026	Montesilvano (Italy)	Antoni Radzimski (Poland)	Zahra Allahverdi (AZE)

== Under-12 winners ==
Year	Location	Open	Girls
1986	San Juan (Puerto Rico)	Dharshan Kumaran (England)	Dalines Borges (Puerto Rico)
1987	San Juan (Puerto Rico)	Hedinn Steingrimsson (Iceland)	Yvonne Krawiec (United States)
1988	Timișoara (Romania)	Judit Polgár (Hungary)	Zhu Chen (China)
1989	Aguadilla (Puerto Rico)	Marcin Kamiński (Poland)	Diana Darchia (Soviet Union)
1990	Fond du Lac (United States)	Boris Avrukh (Soviet Union)	Corina Peptan (Romania)
1991	Warsaw (Poland)	Rafael Leitão (Brazil)	Dalia Blimke (Poland)
1992	Duisburg (Germany)	Giorgi Bakhtadze (Georgia)	Iweta Radziewicz (Poland)
1993	Bratislava (Slovakia)	Evgeny Shaposhnikov (Russia)	Eugenia Chasovnikova (Russia)
1994	Szeged (Hungary)	Levon Aronian (Armenia)	Nguyen Thi Dung (Vietnam)
1995	São Lourenço (Brazil)	Étienne Bacrot (France)	Viktorija Čmilytė (Lithuania)
1996	Cala Galdana (Spain)	Kamil Mitoń (Poland)	Alexandra Kosteniuk (Russia)
1997	Cannes (France)	Alexander Riazantsev (Russia)	Zhao Xue (China)
1998	Oropesa del Mar (Spain)	Teimour Radjabov (Azerbaijan)	Humpy Koneru (India)
1999	Oropesa del Mar (Spain)	Wang Yue (China)	Nana Dzagnidze (Georgia)
2000	Oropesa del Mar (Spain)	Deep Sengupta (India)	Atousa Pourkashiyan (Iran)
2001	Oropesa del Mar (Spain)	Sergey Karjakin (Ukraine)	Shen Yang (China)
2002	Heraklio (Greece)	Ian Nepomniachtchi (Russia)	Tan Zhongyi (China)
2003	Halkidiki (Greece)	Wei Chenpeng (China)	Ding Yixin (China)
2004	Heraklio (Greece)	Zhao Nan (China)	Klaudia Kulon (Poland)
2005	Belfort (France)	Srinath Narayanan (India)	Meri Arabidze (Georgia)
2006	Batumi (Georgia)	Robert Aghasaryan (Armenia)	Mariam Danelia (Georgia)
2007	Kemer/Antalya (Turkey)	Daniel Naroditsky (United States)	Marsel Efroimski (Israel)
2008	Vũng Tàu (Vietnam)	Sayantan Das (India)	Zhai Mo (China)
2009	Antalya (Turkey)	Bobby Cheng (Australia)	Sarasadat Khademalsharieh (Iran)
2010	Porto Carras (Greece)	Wei Yi (China)	Iulija Osmak (Ukraine)
2011	Caldas Novas (Brazil)	Karthikeyan Murali (India)	Zhansaya Abdumalik (Kazakhstan)
2012	Maribor (Slovenia)	Samuel Sevian (United States)	R. Vaishali (India)
2013	Al-Ain (UAE)	Aram Hakobyan (Armenia)	Zhao Shengxin (China)
2014	Durban (South Africa)	Nguyễn Anh Khôi (Vietnam)	Jennifer Yu (United States)
2015	Porto Carras (Greece)	Mahammad Muradli (Azerbaijan)	Nurgyul Salimova (Bulgaria)
2016	Batumi (Georgia)	Nikhil Kumar (United States)	Bibisara Assaubayeva (Russia)
2017	Poços de Caldas (Brazil)	Vincent Tsay (United States)	Divya Deshmukh (India)
2018	Santiago de Compostela (Spain)	Gukesh Dommaraju (India)	Savitha Shri B (India)
2019	Weifang (China)	Liran Zhou (United States)	Galina Mikheeva (Russia)
2020	Online	Dimitar Mardov (United States)	Alice Lee (United States)
2021	Online	Ihor Samunenkov (Ukraine)	Alice Lee (United States)
2022	Batumi (Georgia)	Artem Uskov (FIDE)	Shubhi Gupta (India)
2023	Sharm El Sheikh (Egypt)	Đầu Khương Duy (Vietnam)	Devindya Oshini Gunawardhana (Sri Lanka)
2024	Montesilvano (Italy)	Mark Smirnov (Kazakhstan)	Xue Tianhao (China)
2025	Almaty (Kazakhstan)	Danis Kuandykuly (Kazakhstan)	Lacey Wang (United States)

== Under-10 winners ==
Year	Location	Boys	Girls
1986	San Juan (Puerto Rico)	Jeff Sarwer (Canada)	Julia Sarwer (Canada)
1987	San Juan (Puerto Rico)	John Viloria (United States)	Suzanna Urminska (United States)
1988	Timișoara (Romania)	John Viloria (United States); Horge Hasbun (Honduras)	Corina Peptan (Romania)
1989	Aguadilla (Puerto Rico)	Irwin Irnandi (Indonesia)	Antoaneta Stefanova (Bulgaria)
1990	Fond du Lac (United States)	Nawrose Farh Nur (United States)	Evelyn Moncayo Romero (Ecuador)
1991	Warsaw (Poland)	Adrien Leroy (France)	Carmen Voicu (Romania)
1992	Duisburg (Germany)	Luke McShane (England)	Parvana Ismaïlova (Azerbaijan)
1993	Bratislava (Slovakia)	Étienne Bacrot (France)	Ana Matnadze (Georgia)
1994	Szeged (Hungary)	Sergey Grishchenko (Russia)	Svetlana Cherednichenko (Ukraine)
1995	São Lourenço (Brazil)	Boris Grachev (Russia)	Alina Motoc (Romania)
1996	Cala Galdana (Spain)	Pentala Harikrishna (India)	Maria Kursova (Russia)
1997	Cannes (France)	Javad Alavi (Iran)	Humpy Koneru (India)
1998	Oropesa del Mar (Spain)	Evgeny Romanov (Russia)	Vera Nebolsina (Russia)
1999	Oropesa del Mar (Spain)	Dmitry Andreikin (Russia)	Kateryna Lahno (Ukraine)
2000	Oropesa del Mar (Spain)	Nguyễn Ngọc Trường Sơn (Vietnam)	Tan Zhongyi (China)
2001	Oropesa del Mar (Spain)	Tamas Fodor Jr. (Hungary)	Tan Zhongyi (China)
2002	Heraklio (Greece)	Eltaj Safarli (Azerbaijan)	Lara Stock (Croatia)
2003	Halkidiki (Greece)	Sanan Sjugirov (Russia)	Hou Yifan (China)
2004	Heraklio (Greece)	Yu Yangyi (China)	Meri Arabidze (Georgia)
2005	Belfort (France)	Sahaj Grover (India)	Wang Jue (China)
2006	Batumi (Georgia)	Koushik Girish (India)	Choletti Sahajasri (India)
2007	Kemer/Antalya (Turkey)	Wang Tongsen (China)	Anna Styazhkina (Russia)
2008	Vũng Tàu (Vietnam)	Jan-Krzysztof Duda (Poland)	Aleksandra Goryachkina (Russia)
2009	Antalya (Turkey)	Bai Jinshi (China)	Gunay Mammadzada (Azerbaijan)
2010	Porto Carras (Greece)	Jason Cao (Canada)	Nomin-Erdene Davaademberel (Mongolia)
2011	Caldas Novas (Brazil)	Zhu Yi (China)	Alexandra Obolentseva (Russia)
2012	Maribor (Slovenia)	Nguyễn Anh Khôi (Vietnam)	Nutakki Priyanka (India)
2013	Al-Ain (UAE)	Awonder Liang (United States)	Saina Salonika (India)
2014	Durban (South Africa)	Nihal Sarin (India)	Divya Deshmukh (India)
2015	Porto Carras (Greece)	R. Praggnanandhaa (India)	Ravi Rakshitta (India)
2016	Batumi (Georgia)	Ilya Makoveev (Russia)	Rochelle Wu (United States)
2017	Poços de Caldas (Brazil)	Liran Zhou (United States)	Wei Yaqing (China)
2018	Santiago de Compostela (Spain)	Jin Yueheng (China)	Samantha Edithso (Indonesia)
2019	Weifang (China)	Savva Vetokhin (Russia)	Alice Lee (United States)
2020	Online	Sina Movahed (Iran)	Omya Vidyarthi (United States)
2021	Online	Yağız Kaan Erdoğmuş (Turkey)	Diana Preobrazhenskaya (Russia)
2022	Batumi (Georgia)	David Lacan Rus (France)	Nika Venskaya (Russia)
2023	Sharm El Sheikh (Egypt)	Danis Kuandykuly (Kazakhstan)	Xue Tianhao (China)
2024	Montesilvano (Italy)	Roman Shogdzhiev (Russia)	Alanna Berikkyzy (Kazakhstan)
2025	Almaty (Kazakhstan)	Yuan Shunzhe (China)	AS Shravanica (India)

== Under-8 winners ==
Year	Location	Boys	Girls
2006	Batumi (Georgia)	Chennamsetti Mohineesh (India)	Ivana Maria Furtado (India)
2007	Kemer/Antalya (Turkey)	Konstantin Savenkov (Russia)	Ivana Maria Furtado (India)
2008	Vũng Tàu (Vietnam)	Tran Minh Thang (Vietnam)	Zhansaya Abdumalik (Kazakhstan)
2009	Antalya (Turkey)	Aryan Gholami (Iran)	Chu Ruotong (China)
2010	Porto Carras (Greece)	Abdulla Gadimbayli (Azerbaijan)	Li Yunshan (China)
2011	Caldas Novas (Brazil)	Awonder Liang (United States)	Bibisara Assaubayeva (Kazakhstan)
2012	Maribor (Slovenia)	Nodirbek Abdusattorov (Uzbekistan)	Motahare Asadi (Iran)
2013	Al-Ain (UAE)	R. Praggnanandhaa (India)	Harmony Zhu (Canada)
2014	Durban (South Africa)	Ilya Makoveev (Russia)	Davaakhuu Munkhzul (Mongolia)
2015	Porto Carras (Greece)	Bharath Subramaniyam (India)	Nguyen Le Cam Hien (Vietnam)
2016	Batumi (Georgia)	Shageldi Kurbandurdyew (Turkmenistan)	Aisha Zakirova (Kazakhstan)
2017	Poços de Caldas (Brazil)	Emrikian Aren C (United States)	Alserkal Rouda Essa (UAE)
2018	Santiago de Compostela (Spain)	Yuvraj Chennareddy (United States)	Zhao Yunqing (China)
2019	Weifang (China)	Artem S. Lebedev (Russia)	Yuan Zhilin (China)
2020	Not held		
2021	Not held		
2022	Batumi (Georgia)	Marc Llari (France)	Charvi A (India)
2023	Sharm El Sheikh (Egypt)	Roman Shogdzhiev (FIDE)	Bodhana Sivanandan (England)
2024	Montesilvano (Italy)	Divith Reddy Adulla (India)	Chen Zhihan (China)
2025	Almaty (Kazakhstan)	Adinur Adilbek (Kazakhstan)	Alisha Bissaliyeva (Kazakhstan)

== See also ==
- World Junior Chess Championship
- European Junior Chess Championship
- European Youth Chess Championship
- North American Youth Chess Championship
- World Rapid Chess Championship Since 2012
- World Blitz Chess Championship Since 2012

== Notes ==
The main source of reference is indicated beneath each year's entry.

Tournament history

The first predecessor of the youth championship was the Cadet Championship. It started off unofficially in 1974 in France for players under 18. The 1975 edition was for U17 but the age limit was not enforced. The 1976 featured very young players such as Julian Hodgson (12) and Garry Kasparov (13) and was recognised by FIDE as the World Championship for Cadets for players under 17 . In 1981 the age limit was reduced to under 16, applicable at the start of the year the championship is played in. It was also the year in which the first girls' championship for U16 was played.

In 1979, International Year of the Child, the first edition of the World Infant Cup was played for under 14. This cup had four editions, 1979, 1980, 1981 and 1984. In 1985 the U14 event was included in the first edition of the World Youth Chess Festival for Peace. Subsequently, the age categories U10, U12 and U18 were introduced. In 1987 the festival included the sections U10, U12, U14 and U18, while the U16 was held separately. In 1988, U16 was incorporated, but U18 was held separately. It was not until 1989 that the festival included all five age categories. Later, the U16 and U18 were sometimes played at separately from the U10, U12 and U14, as was the case in 1990, 1991, 1995 and 1997. In 1997 the name of tournament was changed to the World Youth Chess Championships. The under 8 category was first introduced in 2006.

1974 – Pont-Sainte-Maxence, France, 2–13 July – The first World Cadet Championship was an Under-18 event, organised by the French chess authorities. Thirty players took part in an 11-round Swiss. Englishman Jonathan Mestel won by a one-and-a-half point margin, scoring +8−0=3. The silver and bronze medals went to Evgeny Vladimirov and Oskar Orel, respectively. Also competing were the Canadian Jean Hébert and the Lebanese Bachar Kouatly.

--- The Batsford Chess Yearbook, Kevin J O'Connell (ed.) (1975, Batsford) p. 128

1975 – Creil, France, 1–12 July – The second World Cadets was once again a French organised Under-18 event, comprising twenty-five players in an 11-round Swiss. David Goodman of England won the gold medal (8½/11), with silver going to Terence Wong of Singapore (8/11) and bronze to Predrag Nikolić of Yugoslavia (7/11). Also with 7 points was Australia's Ian Rogers, taking a share of third place. The West German Eric Lobron and Lebanese Bachar Kouatly were two future grandmasters who also took part.

--- The Batsford Chess Yearbook 1975/76, Kevin J O'Connell (ed.) (1976, Batsford) p. 73

1978 – Sas-van-Gent, Netherlands, December 1978 – January 1979 – The World Cadets tournament was held over the New Year. Scotland gained its first ever world champion in chess, Paul Motwani from the city of Dundee. Following closely were England's Nigel Short, aged only 13, and Jose Huergo of Cuba, who required a tie-break to separate them. Other well known players in the pack included Ivan Morovic of Chile and Jóhann Hjartarson of Iceland.

--- CHESS magazine Vol 44. March p. 191

1979 – Belfort, France – (July) – For a second successive year, England's Nigel Short (age 14) narrowly failed to take the World Cadets title, after losing out to his Argentine rival, Marcelo Tempone on the sum of opponent's scores rule (a method of tie-break). Third place was taken by Ivan Morovic and further down the field were future grandmasters Gilberto Milos, Joel Benjamin, Jan Ehlvest, Alon Greenfeld and Jóhann Hjartarson.

--- CHESS magazine Vol 44. October p. 368

1980 – Le Havre, France – (? – ?) – The World Cadet Championship (for players under 17 on 1 September 1980) was played alongside the familiar Le Havre Open chess tournament. A total of fifty-one 'cadets' represented forty-nine different countries. France fielded three players, two by right and a third when immigration officials mysteriously refused entry to the Pakistan entrant. The winner, Valery Salov, displayed the usual Soviet formula of good preparation and technique, with strategically planned draws against his nearest rivals, Alon Greenfeld and Joel Benjamin. Greenfeld might have tied first, but lost his crucial last round game with Benjamin, despite having the white pieces. Some of the players and their seconds were unhappy about the conditions, particularly the dormitory-style accommodation and food quality. Many also felt that the Brazilian, Gilberto Milos, was unfairly treated when his twice adjourned game was concluded on the free day without prior warning. He was awoken at 9.10 am and told that his clock had been started. Understandably upset, he played and lost, his follow-up protest falling on deaf ears. The list of entries also contained future grandmasters Suat Atalık and Dibyendu Barua, among others.

--- CHESS magazine Vol 45. Aug–Sept p. 237

1989 – Aguadilla, Puerto Rico – (28 July – 9 August) – There were 54 countries and 281 juniors participating. Living conditions were quite stretched as the organisers were not expecting the players to be accompanied by more than 200 adults. Regrettably, there was a shortage of competent decision-making organisers, but a friendly, good humoured atmosphere prevailed and the problems were resolved amicably. A variety of tie-breaking systems were used to separate the final places. In the case of the Boys Under-10 category, the resulting split was particularly harsh on the Brazilian Rafael Leitão, who was deprived of a gold medal on the basis of 'strength of first round opponent'. Antoaneta Stefanova, the winner of the girls Under-10 event, was already being talked about as a future women's world champion. IM Bob Wade attended the event and felt that the most successful countries were those that prepared their competitors best in terms of 'basic' rather than 'opening' training. Among the lesser medals were; Alex Sherzer (silver, U-18), Christopher Lutz (bronze, U-18), Matthew Sadler (silver, U-16), Vladimir Kramnik (silver, U-14), Peter Leko (bronze, U-10). In the girls events, Tea Lanchava took silver in the U-16 and Corina Peptan, bronze in the U-12.

--- CHESS magazine Vol 54. November pp. 26–27

1990 – Fond du Lac, USA – (14–22 July) – Wisconsin's Marian College hosted the 5th World Youth Festival, which attracted 170 players from 44 nations. With federation officials and parental entourages, this number swelled to more than 300. It was the first time that the USA had hosted a chess event of this size and importance and the accommodation and conditions received high praise from the competitors. Judit Polgár celebrated victory on her fourteenth birthday (23 July), by taking the gold medal in the Boys U-14 event. This was the second occasion on which she had successfully competed in the Boys category. Her father, Laszlo Polgar, pointed out that Judit's last three 'world' competitions, including the Thessaloniki Olympiad, had resulted in a score of +26 =9 -0. Vasily Emelin of the USSR and Gabriel Schwartzman of Romania finished in silver and bronze medal places. Russia's Diana Darchia won the corresponding Girls' U-14 event from the USSR's Inna Gaponenko and Hungarian Monika Grabics. In the Boys U-12, Boris Avrukh outdistanced second placed John Viloria and third placed Peter Leko. Corina Peptan was triumphant in the Girls U-12, ahead of Monika Bobrowska and Nikoletta Lakos. In the Boys U-10, Nawrose Nur won by a good margin from the Romanian Alin Berescu and Adrien Leroy of France. Ecuador's Evelyn Moncayo took gold in the Girls U-10, while Claudia Bilciu of Romania and Jovanka Houska of England took silver and bronze, respectively. New In Chess Best Game awards were chaired by Arnold Denker and won by Judit Polgár, Yvonne Krawiec, Tal Shaked, Corina Peptan, Francisco Vallejo Pons and Claudia Bilciu. Polgar made it a clean sweep by winning an Under-14 Blitz tournament from Vasily Emelin and Ronan Har-Zvi of Israel.

--- CHESS magazine Vol 55. October p. 5 and November p. 26

1992 – Duisburg, Germany – (29 June – 13 July) – The venue, a large sports complex, was playing host to over 500 competitors engaged in 10 World Junior Championships. There were initially some problems with overcrowding, but these were quickly sorted out by the organisers. There was a commentary room where those who had finished their games could benefit from the expert opinion of Grandmaster Helmut Pfleger. TV screens were displayed throughout the venue to cover the positions on the top boards. Peter Leko of Hungary, the world's youngest IM at the time, played in the U-14 event and was expected to win with an enormous Elo rating advantage over his closest rival. However, his opponents had not read the script and he finished a disappointing fourth. There was a shock too in the Girls' U-14 section, when the Romanian Corina Peptan, top seed and national champion at 14, only managed to secure the silver medal. In contrast, the U-18 events went according to expectation with Sakaev (in the Boys/Open) and Kadimova (in the Girls) totally dominant. There was a good showing from the English contingent; by comparison other western European nations failed miserably. McShane won the Boys/Open U-10 event, despite being the youngest competitor at 8. Ruth Sheldon took silver in the U-12 Girls and Harriet Hunt a bronze in the U-14 Girls, even though she was heavily outrated.

--- CHESS magazine Vol 57. September pp. 20–22

1993 – Bratislava, Slovakia – (17–29 July) – Held at the Park of Culture and Leisure, the Slovak Federation played host to a record number of participants from a staggering 78 nations. Unfortunately the tournament got off to a bad start, before even a game had been played. The organisers had implemented an arduous registration process, designed to catch late registrants and penalise them or their federation with a $100 U.S. late entry fee. It appeared to be a cynical attempt at earning the organising committee a tidy sum. There were a number of protests; some paid up and others refused. Before things turned too nasty, Florencio Campomanes stepped in and ordered a reduction in the fee, which helped patch things up. However, the French were so upset that they decided to boycott the opening celebrations. Attending the closing ceremony was former World Champion Anatoly Karpov, the guest of honour replacing Campomanes on his departure. The contest contained a few surprises; Malakhov edged out Peter Leko in the Boys U-14 and a similar fate awaited the rapidly improving Vallejo Pons in the Boys U-12.

--- CHESS magazine Vol 58. October pp. 16–18

1994 – Szeged, Hungary – (August) – Peter Leko finally got his gold medal, this time in the U-16 Boys event. Bearing in mind his past disappointments, other high-profile players missed gold medals at this event, including 2 future World Champions. In retrospect, this underlines the strength of the event. Among those taking home silver medals, were Alexandra Kosteniuk (U-10 Girls), Étienne Bacrot (U-12 Boys) and Rustam Kasimdzhanov (U-16 Boys). There was an impressive showing from the Ukrainian Girls Squad, taking 3 of the 5 gold medals on offer.

--- CHESS magazine Vol 59. January p. 48

1998 – Oropesa del Mar, Spain – (October – November) – The Marina d'Or venue hosted over 1000 players from 48 countries. Russia's Alexander Grischuk, already an International Master and close to achieving the Grandmaster title, competed in the U-18 category at 15 years old. England exceeded expectations by winning two gold medals. Russia's Kosintseva sisters also attracted attention with strong performances for the Ladies chess; Nadezhda won gold in the U-14 category and Tatiana took silver in the U-12 category. The Open U-14 section comprised a particularly strong field, with David Navara and Zahar Efimenko finishing with silver and bronze respectively.

--- CHESS magazine Vol 63. December pp. 37–40

== Results ==
- "FSI - Federazione Scacchistica Italiana". Archived from the original on 15 October 2024.
- "FSI - Federazione Scacchistica Italiana". Archived from the original on 21 February 2025.
- "FSI - Federazione Scacchistica Italiana". Archived from the original on 20 June 2024.
- "FSI - Federazione Scacchistica Italiana". Archived from the original on 25 June 2022.
