= Artiom Tsepotan =

Ukrainian chess player (born 1978)

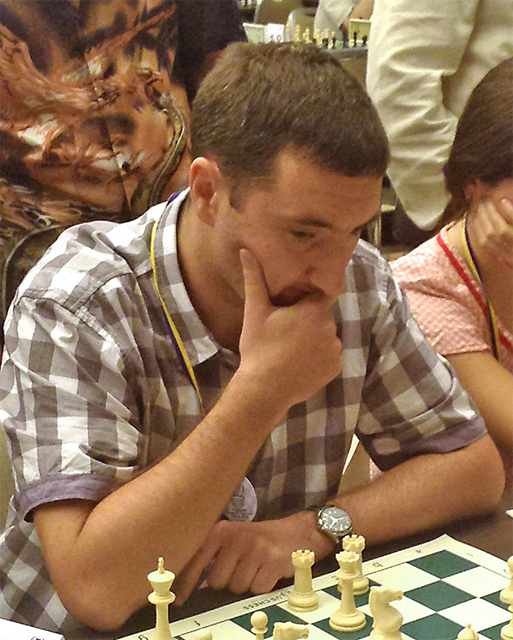

Personal information
- Born: Артем Цепотан; April 9, 1978 (age 48) Kharkiv, Ukrainian SSR, Soviet Union

Chess career
- Country: Ukraine
- Title: International Master (2000)
- FIDE rating: 2406 (July 2026)
- Peak rating: 2416 (January 2000)

Artiom Tsepotan (Ukrainian: Артем Цепотан, romanized: Artem Tsepotan; born 9 April 1978) is a Ukrainian chess player holding the title of International master.

He attended the Kharkiv chess school under the guidance of Boris Khanukov. In 2000 he obtained a degree in education at the Kharkiv National Pedagogical University.

He won the Kharkiv city junior championship U20 in 1996 and placed third in the Beirut open in 1998. For many years an instructor at the Kharkiv chess school, in the first years 2000 he was the coach of Anna Ushenina, who won the Women's World Championship 2012 in Khanty-Mansiysk.

In 2015-16 Tsepotan was an online instructor of Liran Zhou, who in August 2017, at the age of 9 years, 3 months and 22 days, became the youngest ever National Master of the U.S. Chess Federation . In 2019 Zhou won the U12 World Youth Championship at Weifang.

In May 2011 Tsepotan launched the website 2700chess.com, which reports the live rating of Grandmasters with over 2700 Elo points ("Super GMs").
