= G. Petar Arnaudov =

Bulgarian chess player

G Petar Arnaudov
Personal information
- Born: August 8, 1986 (age 39) Plovdiv, Bulgaria

Chess career
- Country: Bulgaria
- Title: Grandmaster (2013)
- Peak rating: 2494 (August 2013)

G. Petar Arnaudov (born August 8, 1986, in Plovdiv, Bulgaria) is a Bulgarian chess player and co-founder of modern-chess.com. G. Petar Arnaudov received the International Master (IM) title in 2009 and Grandmaster (GM) in 2013. He is currently living in The Hague.

He was part of the Bulgarian national team in 2013 and is the current team champion of Bulgaria. He is a chess publisher and writer and writes opening articles for New in Chess, Chess base Magazine and Modern Chess Magazine.

== Notable tournaments ==
Tournament Name	Year	ELO	Points
16th ROC Nova College(Haarlem NED)	2019	2478	4.5
64th TCh-BUL Men 2015(Sunny Beach BUL)	2015	2471	5.0
BUL-chT U18(Pleven)	2004	2118	3.5
