= Tata Steel Chess Tournament 2022 =

Chess tournament

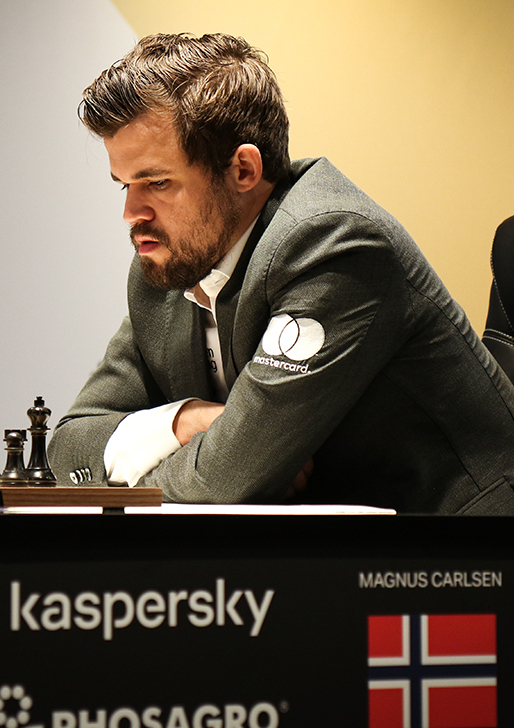
- 2022 Tata Steel Chess Masters winner Magnus Carlsen.
- Location: Wijk aan Zee, Netherlands
- Dates: 14–30 January 2022
- Competitors: 28 from 16 nations
- Winning score: 9.5 points of 13 (Carlsen); 10.5 points of 13 (Erigaisi)

Champion
- (Norway) Magnus Carlsen (Masters) (India) Arjun Erigaisi (Challengers)

The Tata Steel Chess Tournament 2022 was the 84th edition of the annual chess tournament held in Wijk aan Zee. It was held from 14 January to 30 January 2022. No visitors were allowed due to the COVID-19 pandemic in the Netherlands. Norwegian GM Magnus Carlsen scored 9.5/13 in the Masters section with 6 wins and 7 draws, thereby winning the tournament for the eighth time in his career. Indian GM Arjun Erigaisi dominated the Challengers section, winning with a score of 10.5/13, with an impressive 8 wins and 5 draws. World No. 2 Alireza Firouzja failed to reach an agreement with the organizers for compensation for an incident in 2021, and as such didn't participate.

== Standings ==
84th Tata Steel Masters, 14–30 January 2022, Wijk aan Zee, Netherlands, Category XX (2736)
	Player	Rating	1	2	3	4	5	6	7	8	9	10	11	12	13	14	Total	SB	TPR
1	Magnus Carlsen (Norway)	2865		1	1	1	½	½	½	1	½	½	½	1	½	+^{[b]}	9½	60.25	2886
2	Shakhriyar Mamedyarov (Azerbaijan)	2767	0		½	½	½	1	½	½	1	1	½	1	½	½	8	49	2819
3	Richárd Rapport (Hungary)	2763	0	½		½	½	1	½	1	0	½	½	1	1	+^{[b]}	8	47.25	2793
4	Anish Giri (Netherlands)	2772	0	½	½		½	0	1	1	½	½	1	½	½	+^{[a]}	7½	44.5	2764
5	Sergey Karjakin (Russia)	2743	½	½	½	½		1	0	½	½	1	0	1	½	½	7	45.25	2764
6	Jorden van Foreest (Netherlands)	2702	½	0	0	1	0		0	½	½	1	1	1	1	½	7	41.75	2767
7	Andrey Esipenko (Russia)	2714	½	½	½	0	1	1		½	½	½	½	0	½	½	6½	42.75	2739
8	Fabiano Caruana (United States)	2792	0	½	0	0	½	½	½		1	½	½	1	1	½	6½	37.75	2733
9	Jan-Krzysztof Duda (Poland)	2760	½	0	1	½	½	½	½	0		½	½	½	½	½	6	39.25	2708
10	Vidit Gujrathi (India)	2727	½	0	½	½	0	0	½	½	½		1	0	1	1	6	35.5	2709
11	Sam Shankland (United States)	2708	½	½	½	0	1	0	½	½	½	0		½	½	½	5½	36	2686
12	R Praggnanandhaa (India)	2612	0	0	0	½	0	0	1	0	½	1	½		1	+^{[b]}	5½	30	2662
13	Nils Grandelius (Sweden)	2672	½	½	0	½	½	0	½	0	½	0	½	0		1	4½	28.5	2627
14	Daniil Dubov (Russia)	2720	^{[b]}	½	-^{[b]}	-^{[a]}	½	½	½	½	½	0	½	-^{[b]}	0		3½	23.25	2652

2022 Tata Steel Challengers, 14–30 January 2022, Wijk aan Zee, Netherlands, Category XIII (2559)
	Player	Rating	1	2	3	4	5	6	7	8	9	10	11	12	13	14	Total	SB	TPR
1	GM Arjun Erigaisi (India)	2632		½	1	½	½	½	1	1	1	1	1	½	1	1	10½	63	2804
2	GM Thai Dai Van Nguyen (Czech Republic)	2613	½		1	½	½	½	½	½	½	½	1	½	1	1	8½	51.5	2667
3	GM Jonas Buhl Bjerre (Denmark)	2586	0	0		1	1	½	1	½	1	½	1	½	1	½	8½	50	2669
4	GM Rinat Jumabayev (Kazakhstan)	2631	½	½	0		0	1	½	½	1	1	½	1	½	½	7½	45.25	2610
5	GM Erwin l'Ami (Netherlands)	2622	½	½	0	1		0	½	½	1	½	½	1	½	1	7½	44.75	2611
6	GM Lucas van Foreest (Netherlands)	2539	½	½	½	0	1		½	½	½	1	0	1	½	½	7	44.75	2589
7	IM Volodar Murzin (Russia)	2519	0	½	0	½	½	½		½	½	1	½	1	½	1	7	39.25	2591
8	GM Max Warmerdam (Netherlands)	2607	0	½	½	½	½	½	½		½	0	½	1	½	1	6½	38.25	2558
9	GM Surya Shekhar Ganguly (India)	2627	0	½	0	0	0	½	½	½		½	1	½	1	1	6	31.5	2530
10	GM Daniel Dardha (Belgium)	2532	0	½	½	0	½	0	0	1	½		0	1	½	1	5½	31.75	2510
11	GM Marc'Andria Maurizzi (France)	2502	0	0	0	½	½	1	½	½	0	1		0	½	0	4½	28.75	2456
12	IM Polina Shuvalova (Russia)	2516	½	½	½	0	0	0	0	0	½	0	1		½	1	4½	26.75	2455
13	IM Roven Vogel (Germany)	2452	0	0	0	½	½	½	½	½	0	½	½	½		0	4	25	2429
14	WGM Zhu Jiner (China)	2478	0	0	½	½	0	½	0	0	0	0	1	0	1		3½	20	2395

== Masters results by round ==
Pairings and results:

Numbers in parentheses indicate players' scores prior to the round.

Round 1 – 15 January 2022
Vidit Gujrathi	Sam Shankland	1–0
Fabiano Caruana	Sergey Karjakin	½–½
Daniil Dubov	Shakhriyar Mamedyarov	½–½
Andrey Esipenko	Magnus Carlsen	½–½
Anish Giri	R Praggnanandhaa	½–½
Jan-Krzysztof Duda	Richárd Rapport	1–0
Jorden van Foreest	Nils Grandelius	1–0
Round 2 – 16 January 2022
Sam Shankland (0)	Nils Grandelius (0)	½–½
Richárd Rapport (0)	Jorden van Foreest (1)	1–0
R Praggnanandhaa (½)	Jan-Krzysztof Duda (1)	½-½
Magnus Carlsen (½)	Anish Giri (½)	1–0
Shakhriyar Mamedyarov (½)	Andrey Esipenko (½)	½–½
Sergey Karjakin (½)	Daniil Dubov (½)	½–½
Vidit Gujrathi (1)	Fabiano Caruana (½)	½–½
Round 3 – 17 January 2022
Fabiano Caruana (1)	Sam Shankland (½)	½–½
Daniil Dubov (1)	Vidit Gujrathi (1½)	0–1
Andrey Esipenko (1)	Sergey Karjakin (1)	1–0
Anish Giri (½)	Shakhriyar Mamedyarov (1)	½–½
Jan-Krzysztof Duda (1½)	Magnus Carlsen (1½)	½–½
Jorden van Foreest (1)	R Praggnanandhaa (1)	1–0
Nils Grandelius (½)	Richárd Rapport (1)	0–1
Round 4 – 18 January 2022
Sam Shankland (1)	Richárd Rapport (2)	½–½
R Praggnanandhaa (1)	Nils Grandelius (½)	1–0
Magnus Carlsen (2)	Jorden van Foreest (2)	½–½
Shakhriyar Mamedyarov (1½)	Jan-Krzysztof Duda (2)	1–0
Sergey Karjakin (1)	Anish Giri (1)	½–½
Vidit Gujrathi (2½)	Andrey Esipenko (2)	½–½
Fabiano Caruana (1½)	Daniil Dubov (1)	½–½
Round 5 – 20 January 2022
Daniil Dubov (1½)	Sam Shankland (1½)	½–½
Andrey Esipenko (2½)	Fabiano Caruana (2)	½–½
Anish Giri (1½)	Vidit Gujrathi (3)	½–½
Jan-Krzysztof Duda (2)	Sergey Karjakin (1½)	½–½
Jorden van Foreest (2½)	Shakhriyar Mamedyarov (2½)	0–1
Nils Grandelius (½)	Magnus Carlsen (2½)	½–½
Richárd Rapport (2½)	R Praggnanandhaa (2)	1–0
Round 6 – 21 January 2022
Sam Shankland (2)	R Praggnanandhaa (2)	½–½
Magnus Carlsen (3)	Richárd Rapport (3½)	1–0
Shakhriyar Mamedyarov (3½)	Nils Grandelius (1)	½–½
Sergey Karjakin (2)	Jorden van Foreest (2½)	1-0
Vidit Gujrathi (3½)	Jan-Krzysztof Duda (2½)	½–½
Fabiano Caruana (2½)	Anish Giri (2)	0–1
Daniil Dubov (2)	Andrey Esipenko (3)	½–½
Round 7 – 22 January 2022
Andrey Esipenko (3½)	Sam Shankland (2½)	½–½
Anish Giri (3)	Daniil Dubov (2½)	1–0^{[a]}
Jan-Krzysztof Duda (3)	Fabiano Caruana (2½)	0–1
Jorden van Foreest (2½)	Vidit Gujrathi (4)	1–0
Nils Grandelius (1½)	Sergey Karjakin (3)	½–½
Richárd Rapport (3½)	Shakhriyar Mamedyarov (4)	½–½
R Praggnanandhaa (2½)	Magnus Carlsen (4)	0–1

Round 8 – 23 January 2022
Sam Shankland (3)	Magnus Carlsen (5)	½–½
Shakhriyar Mamedyarov (4½)	R Praggnanandhaa (2½)	1–0
Sergey Karjakin (3½)	Richárd Rapport (4)	½–½
Vidit Gujrathi (4)	Nils Grandelius (2)	1–0
Fabiano Caruana (3½)	Jorden van Foreest (3½)	½–½
Daniil Dubov (2½)	Jan-Krzysztof Duda (3)	½–½
Andrey Esipenko (4)	Anish Giri (4)	0–1
Round 9 – 25 January 2022
Anish Giri (5)	Sam Shankland (3½)	1–0
Jan-Krzysztof Duda (3½)	Andrey Esipenko (4)	½–½
Jorden van Foreest (4)	Daniil Dubov (3)	½–½
Nils Grandelius (2)	Fabiano Caruana (4)	0–1
Richárd Rapport (4½)	Vidit Gujrathi (5)	½–½
R Praggnanandhaa (2½)	Sergey Karjakin (4)	0–1
Magnus Carlsen (5½)	Shakhriyar Mamedyarov (5½)	1–0
Round 10 – 26 January 2022
Sam Shankland (3½)	Shakhriyar Mamedyarov (5½)	½–½
Sergey Karjakin (5)	Magnus Carlsen (6½)	½–½
Vidit Gujrathi (5½)	R Praggnanandhaa (2½)	0-1
Fabiano Caruana (5)	Richárd Rapport (5)	0–1
Daniil Dubov (3½)	Nils Grandelius (2)	0–1
Andrey Esipenko (4½)	Jorden van Foreest (4½)	1–0
Anish Giri (6)	Jan-Krzysztof Duda (4)	½–½
Round 11 – 28 January 2022
Jan-Krzysztof Duda (4½)	Sam Shankland (4)	½–½
Jorden van Foreest (4½)	Anish Giri (6½)	1–0
Nils Grandelius (3)	Andrey Esipenko (5½)	½–½
Richárd Rapport (6)	Daniil Dubov (3½)	1–0^{[b]}
R Praggnanandhaa (3½)	Fabiano Caruana (5)	0–1
Magnus Carlsen (7)	Vidit Gujrathi (5½)	½–½
Shakhriyar Mamedyarov (6)	Sergey Karjakin (5½)	½–½
Round 12 – 29 January 2022
Sam Shankland (4½)	Sergey Karjakin (6)	1–0
Vidit Gujrathi (6)	Shakhriyar Mamedyarov (6½)	0–1
Fabiano Caruana (6)	Magnus Carlsen (7½)	0–1
Daniil Dubov (3½)	R Praggnanandhaa (3½)	0–1^{[b]}
Andrey Esipenko (6)	Richárd Rapport (7)	½–½
Anish Giri (6½)	Nils Grandelius (3½)	½–½
Jan-Krzysztof Duda (5)	Jorden van Foreest (5½)	½–½
Round 13 – 30 January 2022
Jorden van Foreest (6)	Sam Shankland (5½)	1–0
Nils Grandelius (4)	Jan-Krzysztof Duda (5½)	½–½
Richárd Rapport (7½)	Anish Giri (7)	½–½
R Praggnanandhaa (4½)	Andrey Esipenko (6½)	1–0
Magnus Carlsen (8½)	Daniil Dubov (3½)	1–0^{[b]}
Shakhriyar Mamedyarov (7½)	Fabiano Caruana (6)	½–½
Sergey Karjakin (6)	Vidit Gujrathi (6)	1–0

== Notes ==
^{a} Dubov forfeited his match in Round 7 against Anish Giri due to COVID-19 contamination in his inner circle and his refusal to wear a mask. He was allowed to play again without a mask after several tests including a PCR returned negative.

^{b} Dubov tested positive for COVID-19 prior to Round 11, hence he was forced to forfeit his games against Rapport, Praggnanandhaa, and Carlsen respectively.
