= Nikolaos Spyropoulos =

Greek chess player (born 2004)

Personal information
- Born: August 20, 2004 (age 21)

Chess career
- Country: Greece
- Title: International Master (2023)
- Peak rating: 2447 (September 2023)

Nikolaos Spyropoulos is a Greek chess player.

== Chess career ==
In October 2017, he tied with Daniel Dardha for second place in the U14 section of the World Youth Rapid Chess Championship. He was ranked in second place after tiebreaks.

In August 2021, he finished in second place in the U18 section of the World Youth Rapid Chess Championship.

In December 2021, he won the U18 section of the World Youth Chess Championship, where he finished two points ahead of the runners-up Harshavardhan G. B. and Ilya Makoveev.
