= Ibragim Khamrakulov =

Spanish chess grandmaster (born 1982)

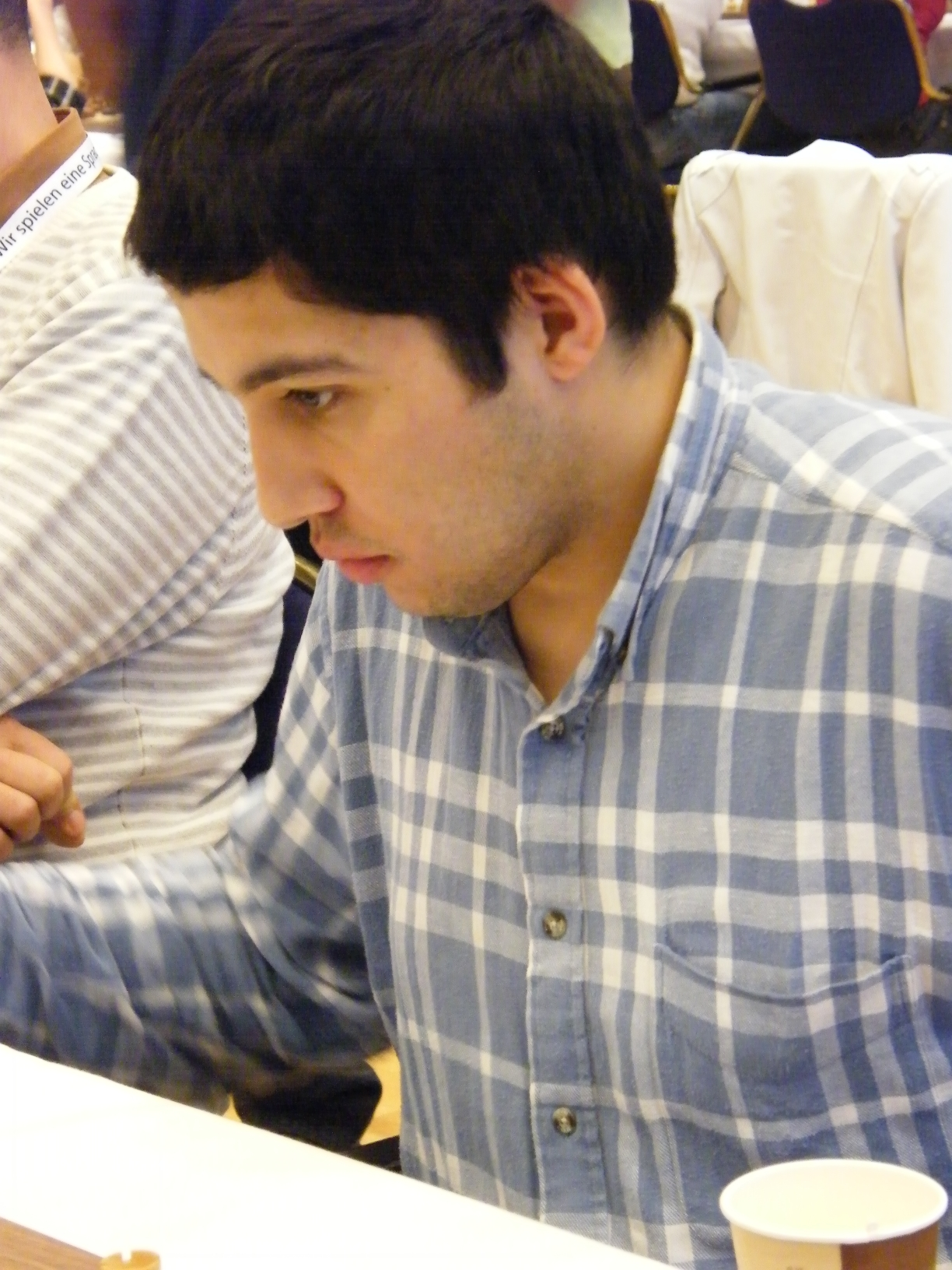
- Ibrohim Hamroqulov in 2008

Personal information
- Born: 28 July 1982 (age 43) Samarqand Region, Uzbekistan

Chess career
- Country: Uzbekistan (until 2005); Spain (since 2005)
- Title: Grandmaster (2006)
- Peak rating: 2604 (October 2007)

Ibragim Khamrakulov (born 28 July 1982) is an Uzbekistani and Spanish chess grandmaster.

== Biography ==
Khamrakulov repeatedly represented Uzbekistan at the World Youth Chess Championship and Asian Youth Chess Championship. In 1998, in Oropesa del Mar he won World Youth Chess Championship in U16 age group.

Khamrakulov's other individual successes include:

- 2001 - shared 1st place in Oldenburg,
- 2002 - shared 1st place in Condom, 1st place in Cáceres,
- 2004 - 1st place in Málaga, 1st place in Sant Llorenç des Cardassar,
- 2005 - shared 1st places in Málaga and Cáceres,
- 2006 - shared 1st place in Condom, shared 1st place in Cáceres,
- 2007 - 3rd place in Spanish Chess Championship, shared 1st places in Benidorm and Albacete, 1st place in Salou,
- 2008 - shared 2nd place in Seville.

Khamrakulov played for Spain in the Chess Olympiad:

- In 2008, at fourth board in the 38th Chess Olympiad in Dresden (+2, =1, -3).

Khamrakulov played for Spain in the European Team Chess Championship:

- In 2007, at fourth board in the 16th European Team Chess Championship in Heraklion (+1, =4, -1).

In 2000, he was awarded the FIDE International Master (IM) title and received the FIDE Grandmaster (GM) title six years later.
