= Ruth Sheldon =

English chess player

Personal information
- Born: May 3, 1980 (age 46)

Chess career
- Country: England
- Title: Woman International Master (1996)
- Peak rating: 2310 (July 1999)

Ruth Sheldon (born 3 May 1980) is an English chess player.

She won the Under-14 Girls' World Youth Chess Championship in 1993, and the Under-18 Championship in 1998.

She played in the England women's team which won the bronze medal in the European Team Chess Championship in 1997, and took part in the 32nd Chess Olympiad.

She has a Ph.D. in sociology from the University of Kent, and is a lecturer in religion and social science at King's College London.
