= Boris Khanukov =

Ukrainian chess player (1939–2023)

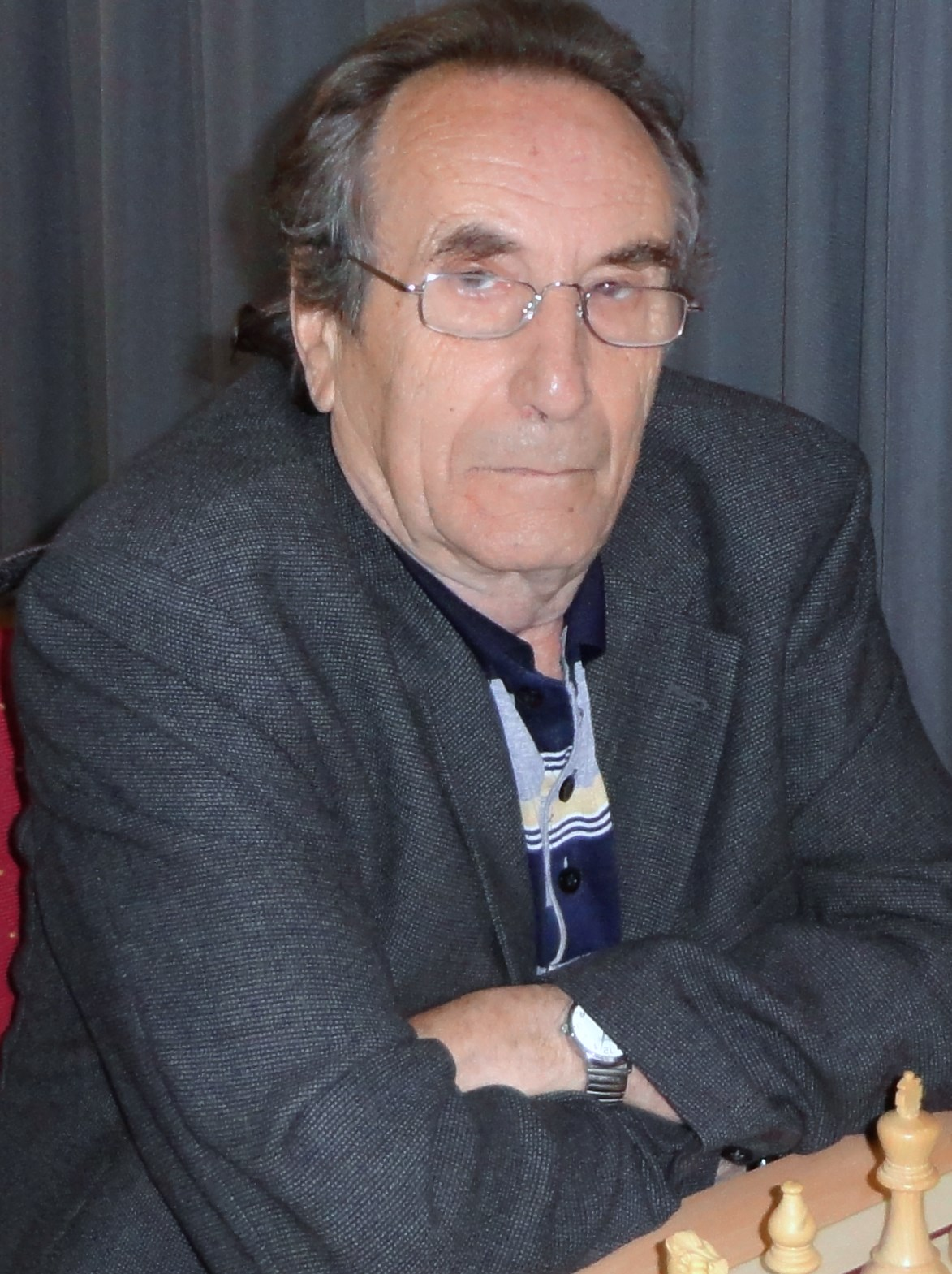
- Khanukov in 2013

Personal information
- Born: 28 January 1939 Kharkiv, Soviet Union
- Died: 16 May 2023 (aged 84) Cologne, Germany

Chess career
- Country: Germany
- Title: International Master (2009)
- Peak rating: 2424 (January 2008)

Boris Khanukov (28 January 1939 in Kharkiv – 16 May 2023) was a Ukrainian-German chess player holding the title of International master.

In the first years of 1980, he graduated in technical sciences at the Kharkiv Polytechnic Institute. Thereafter, he studied at the Chess school of the Palace of Pioneers of Kharkiv, directed by Aleksandr Mazkjevič. In the years 1990, he was a chess instructor at the same school; one of his pupils was Artiom Tsepotan, who later became an International master.

In 1999, Khanukov emigrated to Germany, becoming a member of the German Chess Federation. He played at many Bundesliga championships with the team BSW Wuppertal.

He won the Kharkiv city championship in 1963 and the Kharkiv Oblast championship in 1969 (the latter ahead of Vladimir Savon). However, Khanukov achieved his best results in Senior championships. In 2002, at the European Senior Championship at Saint-Vincent, he shared 2nd-5th place with Mark Taimanov, Jānis Klovāns and Jacob Murey (Vladimir Bukal won the event). In the same year he won the German Senior Championship.

In 2008, he played at the 18th World Senior Championship in Bad Zwischenahn, placing 4th with 8.5/11 among 304 participants (Larry Kaufman won the event on tiebreak over Mihai Șubă).
