= Pedro Antonio Gines Esteo =

Spanish chess grandmaster (born 2004)

Personal information
- Born: January 15, 2004 (age 22) Zaragoza, Spain

Chess career
- Country: Spain
- Title: Grandmaster (2022)
- FIDE rating: 2470 (July 2026)
- Peak rating: 2505 (September 2022)

Pedro Antonio Gines Esteo is a Spanish chess grandmaster.

== Chess career ==
In October 2018, he won the U14 section of the European Youth Chess Championship. He also won the U14 section of the World Youth Chess Championship that same year.

He played for the C.A. Jaime Casas team in the Spanish Team Championship.

In August 2022, he was leading the Spanish Chess Championship alongside grandmasters Eduardo Iturrizaga and Daniil Yuffa going into the final round. He drew against Yuffa in the final round and tied for second place, but was ranked in fourth place overall.

He achieved the Grandmaster title in 2022, after earning his norms at the:

- GM Barcelona Chess Club Maig in May 2022
- Cerrado Ciudad de Gijón XIV in July 2022
- Campeonato de España Absoluto in August 2022
