= Malcolm Pein =

English chess player (born 1960)

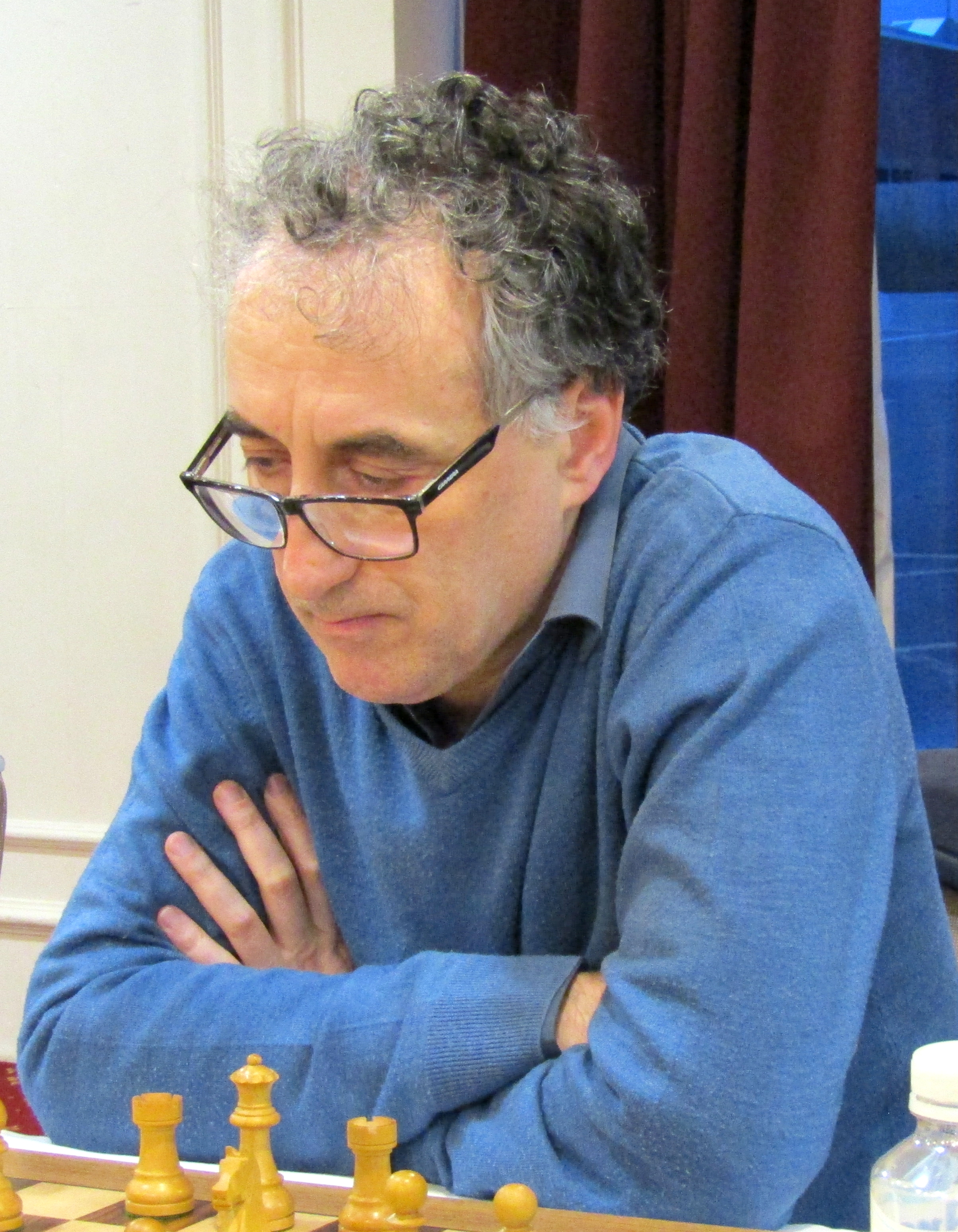
- Pein in 2017

Personal information
- Born: Malcolm Bernard Pein; 14 August 1960 (age 66) Liverpool, England

Chess career
- Country: England
- Title: International Master (1986)
- Peak rating: 2450 (January 1992)

Malcolm Bernard Pein (born 14 August 1960) is a British chess player, chess organizer, author, and journalist. He holds the title of International Master.

== Chess biography ==
Pein earned the title of International Master (IM) in 1986. Pein has been an influential figure in British chess for over thirty years, in the roles of player, coach, journalist, publisher, organizer, fundraiser, and entrepreneur.

Pein won his first tournament in 1965 and was British Junior Champion in 1977. His most notable victories in tournament play include Jon Speelman, Vishy Anand and Lev Psakhis.

In June 1992 he purchased Chess & Bridge Limited and set up a chess shop on the Euston Road in London which was relocated to Baker Street in 2010.

In 1997 Pein was appointed as a consultant to IBM for the iconic Kasparov vs Deep Blue match. He was appointed Match Director for the Brains in Bahrain match between Vladimir Kramnik and the computer program Fritz in 2002. Pein was used as the ‘voice’ of the program in Version 5.32.

In 2009, Pein devised, fundraised, and organized the London Chess Classic, the UK's first world-class elite all-play-all tournament since the Phillips & Drew GLC Chess Challenge of 1986, and was the strongest UK chess tournament by rating to date. The tournament was run annually up to 2019, with the 2020 tournament cancelled due to the COVID-19 pandemic and managerial problems.

In 2010, Malcolm Pein founded Chess in Schools and Communities, a UK-registered charity whose aim is to improve children’s educational outcomes and social development by introducing them to the game of chess. Malcolm has been the charity's CEO since inception, and by the end of 2020 the charity has taught the game to over 250,000 children.

Malcolm devised the concept of an open air chess festival and put this into practice with ChessFest staged in London’s Trafalgar Square. The event has been held annually in July since 2021, and is the largest one-day chess event held in the UK, with 23,300 people visiting the 2024 event.

Malcolm Pein's journalistic career started with spells as the chess correspondent for the short-lived Today and The European newspapers. Pein started writing reports for The Daily Telegraph in 1987 before becoming their full-time correspondent in 1988. Pein has written a daily chess column every day for the past 33 years, over 11,000 columns in total. He is also the owner and executive editor of CHESS magazine, a monthly publication with an international readership.

Malcolm also consulted and devised chess sequences for numerous television and film productions with a chess theme. Including X-Men, Holby City, Coronation Street, Eastenders, the Apple TV Series Slow Horses and a docudrama produced by ARTE on the 1997 Kasparov vs Deep Blue match entitled Rematch which as of March 2024 had been sold to by Disney+ and HBO Europe. Malcolm also played a pivotal role in convincing the BBC to bring back chess after a break of 32 years with the Chess Masters series that will air in 2025. He also advised Canal Plus and Vivendi in the production of a series of programmes on the Grand Chess Tour Rapid and Blitz tournaments in Paris.

Pein is also the representative to FIDE for the English Chess Federation (ECF) and in October 2015 was elected as ECF's International Director. In 2018, Malcolm Pein stood for election as FIDE Deputy President on Georgios Makropoulos' ticket but was unsuccessful. Malcolm Pein told Chess.com he "would be interested" in running for president in the 2022 FIDE Elections. Pein is a two-time recipient of the ECF's President’s Award for Services to Chess having won in 2017 and again in 2024.

Malcolm has been the captain of the England Open team since October 2015, with the team enjoying notable successes at the 2016 Olympiad in Baku against China and Azerbaijan. Pein captained England to a bronze medal finish at the 2019 European Team Chess Championships in Batumi, Georgia.

== Books ==
In addition to his newspaper columns and magazine editorial, Pein has written a number of chess books and booklets, including:

- Grunfeld Defence (Batsford, 1981) – ISBN 978-0713435948
- Trends in Spanish Marshall (Trends Publications, 1990) – ISBN 978-1871541694
- Blumenfeld Gambit [with Jan Przewoznik] (Everyman, 1991) – ISBN 978-0080371337
- Bobby Fischer: The $5,000,000 Comeback [with Nigel Davies and Jonathan Levitt] (Cadogan, 1992) – ISBN 978-1857440423
- Daily Telegraph Guide to Chess (Batsford, 1995) – ISBN 978-0713478143
- The Exchange Grunfeld [with Adrian Mikhalchishin] (Everyman, 1996) – ISBN 978-1857440560

== Example game ==
Pein vs. Bagirov, 1995

Position: d8 black rook, f8 black knight, g8 black rook, a7 black pawn, b7 black bishop, e7 black bishop, f7 black king, h7 black pawn, a6 black knight, c6 black pawn, e6 black pawn, f6 black pawn, g6 black pawn, h6 white pawn, a5 black queen, b5 black pawn, c4 black pawn, d4 white pawn, e4 white pawn, a3 white pawn, c3 white knight, f3 white knight, g3 white bishop, b2 white pawn, c2 white queen, e2 white bishop, f2 white pawn, g2 white pawn, d1 white rook, e1 white rook, g1 white king

Position after 17...Rg8

Malcolm Pein vs. GM Vladimir Bagirov, Zehlendorf-HSK II 1995:
1.Nf3 d5 2.c4 c6 3.d4 e6 4.Nc3 dxc4 5.Bg5 f6 6.Bf4 b5 7.e4 Bb7 8.Be2 Ne7 9.h4 Ng6 10.Bg3 Be7 11.h5 Nf8 12.Qc2 Na6 13.Rd1 Qa5 14.h6 g6 15.0-0 Rd8 16.Rfe1 Kf7 17.a3 Rg8 (see diagram) 18.d5 cxd5 19.exd5 Bxd5 20.Nd4 Qb6 21.Ndxb5 Rd7 22.Nxd5 Rxd5 23.Rxd5 exd5 24.Bxc4 Qc5 25.Rxe7 Kxe7 26.Bd6 Qxd6 27.Nxd6 Nc7 28.Nb5 Nfe6 29.Nxc7 1–0
