= John Saunders (chess player) =

British chess player (born 1953)

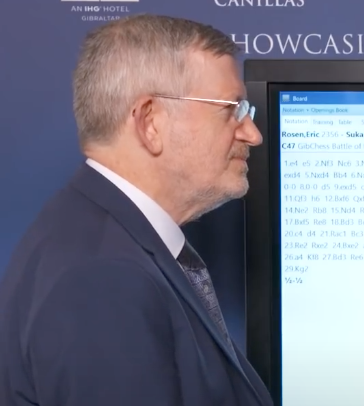
- Saunders in 2022

Personal information
- Born: John Cameron Saunders; 22 February 1953 (age 73) Loudwater, Buckinghamshire

Chess career
- Country: Wales
- FIDE rating: 2160 (February 2015)
- Peak rating: 2255 (January 1993)

John Cameron Saunders (born 1953 in Loudwater, Buckinghamshire) is a British chess player, writer, editor and journalist.

== Chess career ==
Saunders learned to play chess at age seven, beginning competitive play after attending Royal Grammar School, High Wycombe (1963–1970). He continued his education at Selwyn College, Cambridge, obtaining a degree in Law and Classics.

Saunders reached a peak Elo rating of 2255 in January 1993 after winning several domestic open tournaments. He then played internationally for his home country Wales after being chosen first reserve board for the 1997 European Team Championship.

He became less active as a player and established a career in chess writing and journalism, first as editor of British Chess Magazine (1999 to July 2010), then editor of CHESS Magazine (from September 2010), as well as providing news coverage for BBC Ceefax. He has also authored instructive guides on chess covering a broad range of expertise, and is the founder and archivist of Britbase – a chess games database with objective to log the collected game scores of all major tournaments in British chess history.

== Publications ==
- Saunders, John (2007). How To Play Winning Chess. Lorenz Books. ISBN 978-0-7548-1712-3.
- Saunders, John (2008). How To Play and Win at Chess. Southwater. ISBN 978-1-84476-537-9.
- Saunders, John (2009). Advanced Chess; Rules, Skills, Tactics and Strategic Play. Southwater. ISBN 978-1-84476-659-8.
- Saunders, John; Bird, David (2010). The Complete Step-By-Step Guide to Chess & Bridge. Anness. ISBN 978-0-75482-062-8.
