= Rochelle Wu =

American chess player (born 2006)

Personal information
- Born: March 2006 (age 20) Woodland, California

Chess career
- Country: United States
- Title: FIDE Master (2022); Woman Grandmaster (2022)
- Peak rating: 2317 (September 2022)

Rochelle Wu is an American chess player.

== Chess career ==
Wu (born 8 March 2006) began playing chess at the age of 6 along with her older brother. She was coached online by Indian and Serbian players, as well as under former World Champion Garry Kasparov's Young Stars program. She has been ranked number 1 in the world for girls her age and broke the record for the youngest player to represent the U.S. in an Olympiad or World Team (since she participated at the World Team Championship in Kazakhstan in 2019.

In 2016, she won the U10 section of the World Youth Chess Championship.

Wu has competed in the US Women's Chess Championship and been amongst the top women in Titled Tuesday (the strongest online tournament for chess masters) while also playing for Pro Chess League team Saint Louis Arch Bishops.

In November 2023, she finished in second place in the U18 section of the World Youth Chess Championship.

== Education ==
She graduated from Davis Senior High School in 2024, and currently attends UC Irvine, where she is majoring in economics and a minor in statistics.
