= Mark Smirnov =

Kazakhstani chess player (born 2012)

Personal information
- Born: 2012 (age 13–14) Almaty, Kazakhstan

Chess career
- Country: Kazakhstan
- Title: International Master (2025)
- FIDE rating: 2440 (August 2026)
- Peak rating: 2451 (September 2026)

Mark Smirnov is a Kazakhstani chess player and International Master.

== Chess career ==
In November 2024, he won the U12 section of the World Youth Chess Championship.

In May 2025, he played in the U13 category of the ChessKid Youth Championships.

In October 2025, he won the U14 section of the World Youth Chess Championship ahead of Jiang Haochen and Artem Lebedev.
