= Marcin Kamiński (chess player) =

Polish chess player

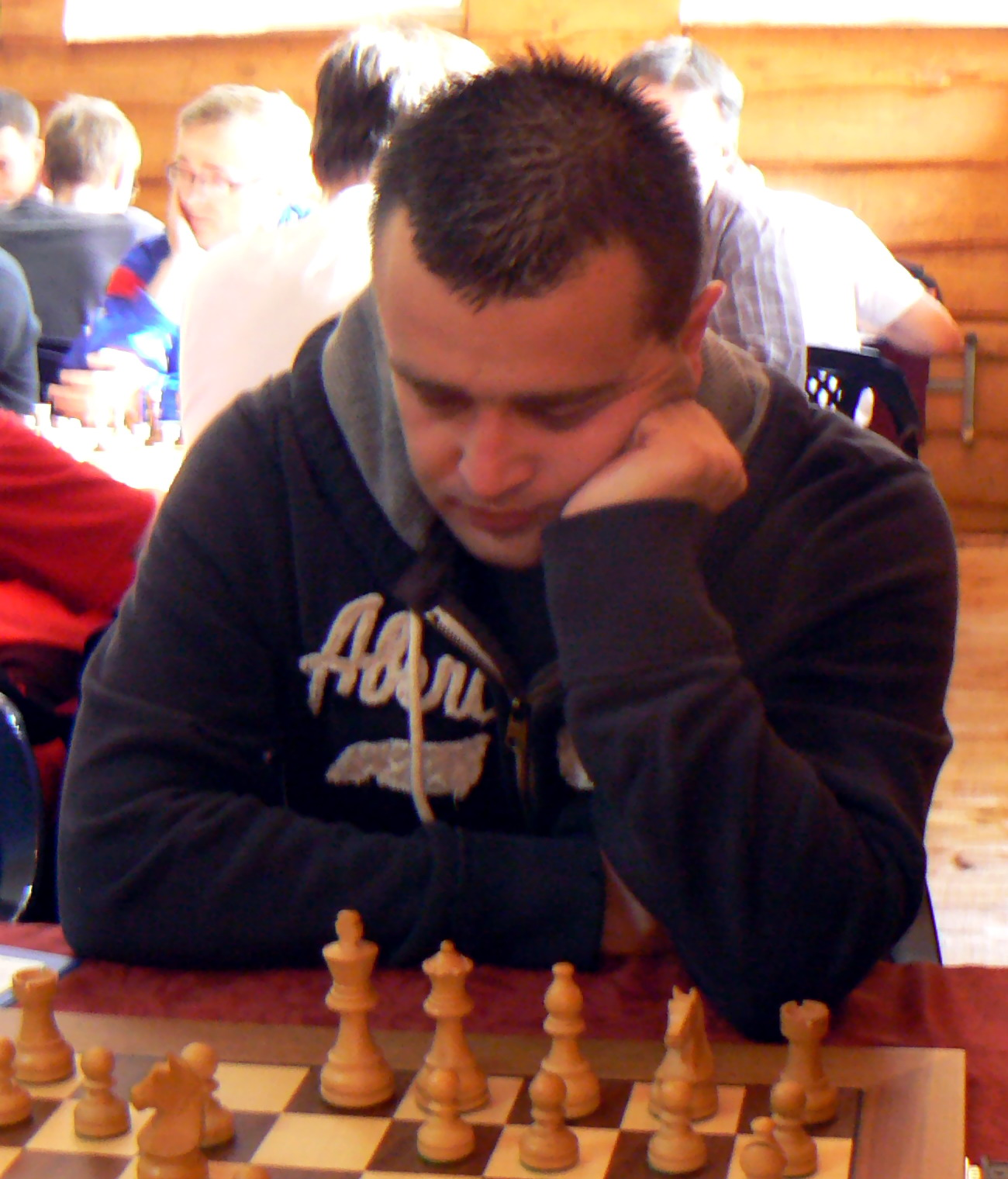
- Kamiński in 2009 (Międzyzdroje)

Personal information
- Born: 10 March 1977 (age 49) Wrocław, Poland

Chess career
- Country: Poland
- Title: Grandmaster (1996)
- FIDE rating: 2457 (July 2026)
- Peak rating: 2540 (January 1997)

Marcin Kamiński (born 10 March 1977) is a Polish chess grandmaster.

== Chess career ==
Marcin Kamiński learned play chess at the age of 4 years. He chess career began as a very successful junior player in the late 1980s and early 1990s. In 1989 he won World Youth Chess Championship (U12) in Aguadilla. Two years later, in Warsaw he repeated this success in the category up to 14 years. In 1993 Marcin Kamiński won the silver medal in European Youth Chess Championship. In 1994 - 1998 he participated in individual Polish Chess Championship finals. Winner of many tournaments, among them are: Katowice in 1995, Lázně Bohdaneč in 1996, Koszalin 1997, Ken Smith Memorial in Dallas (2001, 2002). Marcin Kamiński has also competed successfully in several Polish Team Chess Championships (team silver in 1999 and bronze in 1997, 2000).

Marcin Kamiński played for Poland in Chess Olympiads:

- In 1994, at second reserve board in the 31st Chess Olympiad in Moscow (+6, =2, -2),
- In 1996, at third board in the 32nd Chess Olympiad in Yerevan (+2, =6, -2),
- In 1998, won individual bronze at reserve board in the 33rd Chess Olympiad in Elista (+4, =4, -0).

== Personal life ==
At the end of the 1990s moved to the United States for education. Marcin Kamiński graduated from University of Texas at Dallas and seeks a bachelor's degree in Computer Science. Together with University of Texas at Dallas Chess Team win best college "Final Four" in Miami in 2002. Together with Paweł Blehm founded the Chessaid dedicated to chess training by Internet.
