= Tata Steel Chess Tournament 2021 =

Chess tournament

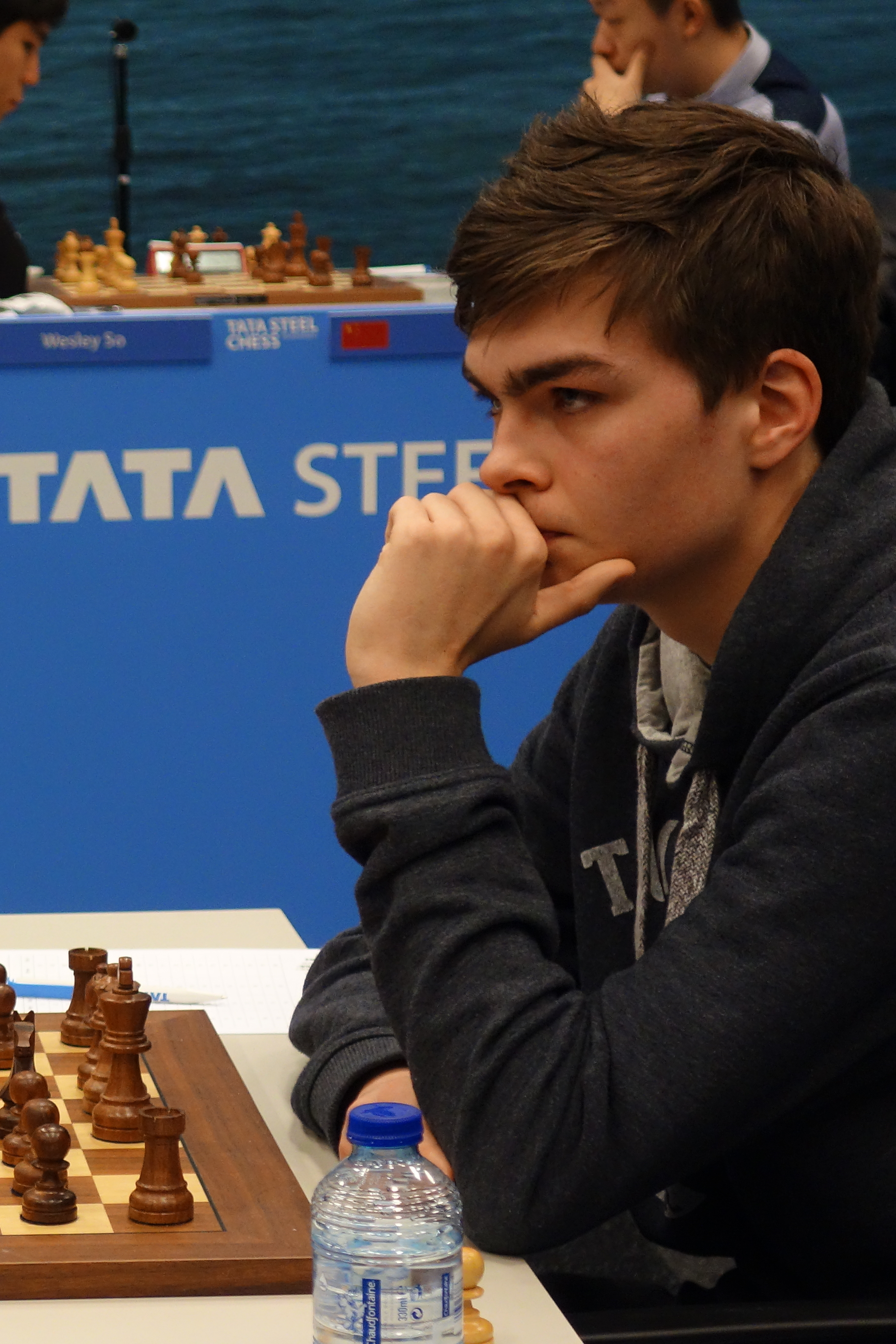
- Tata Steel Chess Tournament 2021 winner Jorden van Foreest
- Location: Wijk aan Zee, Netherlands
- Dates: 15–31 January 2021
- Competitors: 14 from 11 nations
- Winning score: 8.5 points of 13

Champion
- (Netherlands) Jorden van Foreest

The Tata Steel Chess Tournament 2021 was the 83rd edition of the Tata Steel Chess Tournament. It was held in Wijk aan Zee, Netherlands from 15–31 January 2021, but was not open to visitors ("online only"). The tournament was won by Jorden van Foreest, who defeated Anish Giri in an Armageddon playoff.

== Standings ==
83rd Tata Steel Masters, 15–31 January 2021, Wijk aan Zee, Netherlands, Category XIX (2725)
	Player	Rating	1	2	3	4	5	6	7	8	9	10	11	12	13	14	Total	TB	SB	TPR
1	Jorden van Foreest (Netherlands)	2671		½	½	½	½	½	1	1	1	½	1	½	½	½	8½	1+A	53.00	2839
2	Anish Giri (Netherlands)	2764	½		½	½	½	½	½	1	1	½	½	1	1	½	8½	1	52.25	2832
3	Andrey Esipenko (Russia)	2677	½	½		½	½	1	½	0	½	½	1	1	½	1	8		49.00	2815
4	Fabiano Caruana (United States)	2823	½	½	½		½	½	½	½	½	½	½	1	1	1	8		48.25	2804
5	Alireza Firouzja (FIDE) (Note: Firouzja announced in 2019 that he would no longer play under the Iranian chess federation, due their ban on Iranians playing against Israelis. He instead competed as a FIDE-licensed competitor until mid-2021, when he began to represent France.)	2749	½	½	½	½		0	1	½	½	1	1	½	½	1	8		48.00	2810
6	Magnus Carlsen (Norway)	2862	½	½	0	½	1		½	½	1	½	½	½	1	½	7½		47.25	2771
7	Pentala Harikrishna (India)	2732	0	½	½	½	0	½		½	1	½	½	½	½	1	6½		38.75	2724
8	Aryan Tari (Norway)	2625	0	0	1	½	½	½	½		½	½	½	½	½	½	6		38.00	2703
9	Nils Grandelius (Sweden)	2663	0	0	½	½	½	0	0	½		1	½	½	1	1	6		34.00	2700
10	Jan-Krzysztof Duda (Poland)	2743	½	½	½	½	0	½	½	½	0		½	½	½	½	5½		35.75	2666
11	David Antón Guijarro (Spain)	2679	0	½	0	½	0	½	½	½	½	½		½	½	½	5		30.75	2641
12	Radosław Wojtaszek (Poland)	2705	½	0	0	0	½	½	½	½	½	½	½		½	½	5		30.75	2639
13	Maxime Vachier-Lagrave (France)	2784	½	0	½	0	½	0	½	½	0	½	½	½		1	5		29.75	2633
14	Alexander Donchenko (Germany)	2668	½	½	0	0	0	½	0	½	0	½	½	½	0		3½		23.00	2554

== Masters results by round ==
Pairings and results:

Numbers in parentheses indicate players' scores prior to the round.

Round 1 – 16 January 2021
Pentala Harikrishna	Maxime Vachier-Lagrave	½–½
Radosław Wojtaszek	David Antón Guijarro	½–½
Magnus Carlsen	Alireza Firouzja	1–0
Andrey Esipenko	Jan-Krzysztof Duda	½–½
Nils Grandelius	Alexander Donchenko	1–0
Fabiano Caruana	Jorden van Foreest	½–½
Anish Giri	Aryan Tari	1–0
Round 2 – 17 January 2021
Pentala Harikrishna (½)	Andrey Esipenko (½)	½–½
Jorden van Foreest (½)	Anish Giri (1)	½–½
Jan-Krzysztof Duda (½)	Nils Grandelius (1)	0-1
Alexander Donchenko (0)	Fabiano Caruana (½)	0–1
Maxime Vachier-Lagrave (½)	Alireza Firouzja (0)	½–½
David Antón Guijarro (½)	Magnus Carlsen (1)	½–½
Aryan Tari (0)	Radosław Wojtaszek (½)	½–½
Round 3 – 18 January 2021
Magnus Carlsen (1½)	Aryan Tari (½)	½–½
Radosław Wojtaszek (1)	Jorden van Foreest (1)	½–½
Fabiano Caruana (1½)	Jan-Krzysztof Duda (½)	½–½
Nils Grandelius (2)	Pentala Harikrishna (1)	0–1
Anish Giri (1½)	Alexander Donchenko (0)	½–½
Andrey Esipenko (1)	Maxime Vachier-Lagrave (1)	½–½
Alireza Firouzja (½)	David Antón Guijarro (1)	1–0
Round 4 – 19 January 2021
Aryan Tari (1)	Alireza Firouzja (1½)	½–½
Jan-Krzysztof Duda (1)	Anish Giri (2)	½–½
Andrey Esipenko (1½)	Nils Grandelius (2)	½–½
Pentala Harikrishna (2)	Fabiano Caruana (2)	½–½
Alexander Donchenko (½)	Radosław Wojtaszek (1½)	½–½
Maxime Vachier-Lagrave (1½)	David Antón Guijarro (1)	½–½
Jorden van Foreest (1½)	Magnus Carlsen (2)	½–½
Round 5 – 21 January 2021
Alireza Firouzja (2)	Jorden van Foreest (2)	½–½
David Antón Guijarro (1½)	Aryan Tari (1½)	½–½
Anish Giri (2½)	Pentala Harikrishna (2½)	½–½
Fabiano Caruana (2½)	Andrey Esipenko (2)	½–½
Magnus Carlsen (2½)	Alexander Donchenko (1)	½–½
Nils Grandelius (2½)	Maxime Vachier-Lagrave (2)	1–0
Radosław Wojtaszek (2)	Jan-Krzysztof Duda (1½)	½–½
Round 6 – 22 January 2021
Alexander Donchenko (1½)	Alireza Firouzja (2½)	0–1
Jorden van Foreest (2½)	David Antón Guijarro (2)	1–0
Nils Grandelius (3½)	Fabiano Caruana (3)	½–½
Pentala Harikrishna (3)	Radosław Wojtaszek (2½)	½–½
Andrey Esipenko (2½)	Anish Giri (3)	½–½
Jan-Krzysztof Duda (2)	Magnus Carlsen (3)	½–½
Maxime Vachier-Lagrave (2)	Aryan Tari (2)	½–½
Round 7 – 23 January 2021
David Antón Guijarro (2)	Alexander Donchenko (1½)	½–½
Aryan Tari (2½)	Jorden van Foreest (3½)	0–1
Fabiano Caruana (3½)	Maxime Vachier-Lagrave (2½)	1–0
Anish Giri (3½)	Nils Grandelius (4)	1–0
Magnus Carlsen (3½)	Pentala Harikrishna (3½)	½–½
Alireza Firouzja (3½)	Jan-Krzysztof Duda (2½)	1–0
Radosław Wojtaszek (3)	Andrey Esipenko (3)	0–1

Round 8 – 24 January 2021
Alexander Donchenko (2)	Aryan Tari (2½)	½–½
Pentala Harikrishna (4)	Alireza Firouzja (4½)	0–1
Maxime Vachier-Lagrave (2½)	Jorden van Foreest (4½)	½–½
Fabiano Caruana (4½)	Anish Giri (4½)	½–½
Nils Grandelius (4)	Radosław Wojtaszek (3)	½–½
Jan-Krzysztof Duda (2½)	David Antón Guijarro (2½)	½–½
Andrey Esipenko (4)	Magnus Carlsen (4)	1–0
Round 9 – 26 January 2021
Radosław Wojtaszek (3½)	Fabiano Caruana (5)	0–1
Alireza Firouzja (5½)	Andrey Esipenko (5)	½–½
David Antón Guijarro (3)	Pentala Harikrishna (4)	½–½
Anish Giri (5)	Maxime Vachier-Lagrave (3)	1–0
Jorden van Foreest (5)	Alexander Donchenko (2½)	½–½
Magnus Carlsen (4)	Nils Grandelius (4½)	1–0
Aryan Tari (3)	Jan-Krzysztof Duda (3)	½–½
Round 10 – 27 January 2021
Fabiano Caruana (6)	Magnus Carlsen (5)	½–½
Jan-Krzysztof Duda (3½)	Jorden van Foreest (5½)	½–½
Pentala Harikrishna (4½)	Aryan Tari (3½)	½–½
Andrey Esipenko (5½)	David Antón Guijarro (3½)	1–0
Nils Grandelius (4½)	Alireza Firouzja (6)	½–½
Maxime Vachier-Lagrave (3)	Alexander Donchenko (3)	1–0
Anish Giri (6)	Radosław Wojtaszek (3½)	1–0
Round 11 – 29 January 2021
Aryan Tari (4)	Andrey Esipenko (6½)	1–0
Alireza Firouzja (6½)	Fabiano Caruana (6½)	½–½
Jorden van Foreest (6)	Pentala Harikrishna (5)	1–0
Magnus Carlsen (5½)	Anish Giri (7)	½–½
David Antón Guijarro (3½)	Nils Grandelius (5)	½–½
Alexander Donchenko (3)	Jan-Krzysztof Duda (4)	½–½
Radosław Wojtaszek (3½)	Maxime Vachier-Lagrave (4)	½–½
Round 12 – 30 January 2021
Radosław Wojtaszek (4)	Magnus Carlsen (6)	½–½
Maxime Vachier-Lagrave (6)	Jan-Krzysztof Duda (4½)	½–½
Nils Grandelius (5½)	Aryan Tari (5)	½–½
Andrey Esipenko (6½)	Jorden van Foreest (7)	½–½
Fabiano Caruana (7)	David Antón Guijarro (4)	½–½
Pentala Harikrishna (5)	Alexander Donchenko (3½)	1–0
Anish Giri (7½)	Alireza Firouzja (7)	½–½
Round 13 – 31 January 2021
Alireza Firouzja (7½)	Radosław Wojtaszek (4½)	½–½
Jan-Krzysztof Duda (5)	Pentala Harikrishna (6)	½–½
Alexander Donchenko (3½)	Andrey Esipenko (7)	0–1
Aryan Tari (5½)	Fabiano Caruana (7½)	½–½
Jorden van Foreest (7½)	Nils Grandelius (6)	1–0
Magnus Carlsen (6½)	Maxime Vachier-Lagrave (6½)	1–0
David Antón Guijarro (4½)	Anish Giri (8)	½–½

=== Firouzja controversy ===
Going into the final round of the tournament, Alireza Firouzja had the chance to tie for first with a win in his final game. However, due to the tournament's tiebreaker rules, he would be unable to compete for first place even if he finished with the same number of points as the tournament's leaders. In his final round matchup against Radosław Wojtaszek, the arbiters suggested mid-game that the two move to a different table, irritating Firouzja. The situation generated controversy, with many players supporting Firouzja and claiming that arbiters shouldn't interrupt games in such situations. and the event organizers ultimately apologized. The game ultimately ended in a draw, and Firouzja placed fifth in the tournament with a score of 8/13 (+4-1=8). Firouzja accepted the organizers' apology, but demanded a financial compensation for the incident as part of negotiations for his participation in 2022. His demand was turned down, and Firouzja didn't participate in the 2022 tournament.
