= David Goodman (chess player) =

British chess player and writer

Personal information
- Born: 25 February 1958 (age 68)

Chess career
- Country: England
- Title: International Master (1982)
- FIDE rating: 2405 (July 2026)
- Peak rating: 2410 (January 1986)

David Simon Charles Goodman (born 25 February 1958 in England) is an International Master of chess, chess writer and teacher, and former journalist.

== Career ==
He was educated at Latymer Upper School in London and at Keble College, Oxford. He has a BA and honorary MA from Oxford in Philosophy, Politics, and Economics.

Goodman won the World Youth Chess Championship (Cadets, under-18) in 1975. He played #10 on the English national team in Moscow in 1977. In 1978 he was part of the five-man English team that won the World Under-26 Team Championship in Mexico City. He was awarded the IM title in 1983, and reached a FIDE Elo rating of 2405. He has been inactive in competitive chess since the 1990s.

Goodman started his journalism career as a stringer reporting on international chess tournaments for The Associated Press, before joining the company as a full-time reporter and editor in 1990.

One particular "scoop" was when Goodman helped to break the news that Soviet Defense Minister Dmitriy Ustinov was dead. The 1984–1985 World Chess Championship was played in Moscow's Hall of Columns where the bodies of Soviet leaders used to lie in state. After a series of unusual timeouts at the match, Goodman was able to establish through his chess contacts that Ustinov had died.

Goodman left AP in 2002, to become a full-time chess teacher in New York City. As of December 2009, Goodman is a coach for the elementary school chess team of the Abraham Joshua Heschel High School in New York City.

== Books ==
- Maneuvers in Moscow: Karpov-Kasparov II (Macmillan Chess Library) by Raymond Keene, David Goodman (Paperback – January 1986) ISBN 0-02-028720-8
- The Centenary Match Kasparov-Karpov III by Raymond Keene, David Goodman (Paperback – December 1986) ISBN 0-02-028700-3
- Showdown in Seville Kasparov-Karpov IV by Raymond Keene, David Goodman (Paperback – October 2003) ISBN 1-84382-121-4
- Man Versus Machine: Kasparov Versus Deep Blue by David Goodman, Raymond Keene (Paperback – May 1997) ISBN 1-888281-06-5
