= Vincent Tsay =

American chess player (born 2005)

Personal information
- Born: 2005 (age 20–21) Manhasset, New York

Chess career
- Country: United States
- Title: FIDE Master (2017)
- Peak rating: 2378 (February 2023)

Vincent Tsay is an American chess player.

== Chess career ==
He began playing chess at the age of 9.

In 2017, he won the World Youth Chess Championship in Poços de Caldas.

In March 2018, he won the New York State Scholastic Championship.

In March 2021, he was named to the age 14 section of the All-America Chess Team.

== Personal life ==
He studied economics and philosophy at Washington University in St. Louis.
