= Cala Galdana =

Coastal resort in Menorca, Spain

Coordinates: 39.937°N 3.963°E

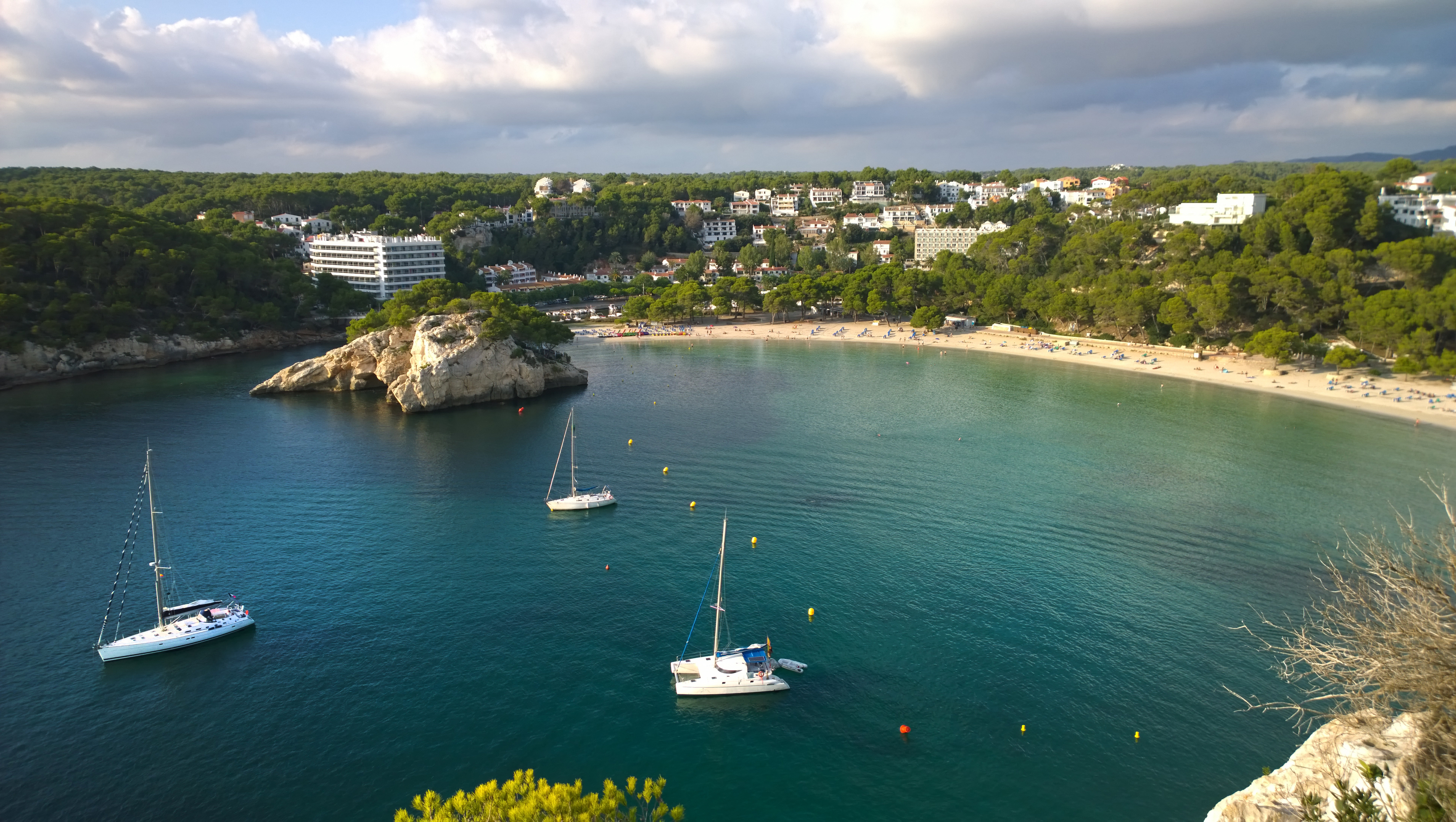
Cala Galdana

Cala Galdana (Galdana cove) is a coastal resort in Menorca, 9 km south of Ferreries. The cove was largely undeveloped until the 1960s.
