= Ilya Makoveev =

Russian chess player (born 2006)

Personal information
- Born: May 4, 2006 (age 20) Dedovsk, Russia

Chess career
- Country: Russia (until 2024); FIDE (since 2024)
- Title: FIDE Master (2018)
- Peak rating: 2338 (March 2020)

Ilya Makoveev (Russian: Илья Петрович Маковеев; born 4 May 2006) is a Russian FIDE Master.

== Biography ==
Ilya Makoveev started playing chess at the age of five. Since 2012 he has lived in Gelendzhik (Krasnodar Krai). In 2014, Ilya Makoveev won the Russian Youth Chess Championship in the U08 age group, and in 2015, he repeated this success in the U11 age group. In 2016, Ilya Makoveev won the Russian Youth Rapid and Blitz Chess Championship in the U11 age group, and in 2017 he repeated this double victory in the U13 age group.

Ilya Makoveev repeatedly represented Russia at the European Youth Chess Championships and World Youth Chess Championships in different age groups. He is a two-time European Youth Chess Championship winner: in 2014, in Batumi in the U08 age group, and in 2015, in Poreč in the U10 age group. Ilya Makoveev is also a two-time World Youth Chess Championship winner: in 2014, in Batumi in the U08 age group, and in 2016, in Durban in the U10 age group.

In 2015, Ilya Makoveev won the World School Rapid and Blitz Chess Championships in the U09 age group. He participated in the Moscow international chess festival Moscow Open youth tournament U09, winning once (2015) and ranking second once (2014). In 2016, Ilya Makoveev won the World School Chess Championship in the U11 age group. In August 2018, in Riga, he won a silver medal in the European Youth Chess Championship in the U12 age group.
