= Tamas Fodor Jr. =

Hungarian chess grandmaster (born 1991)

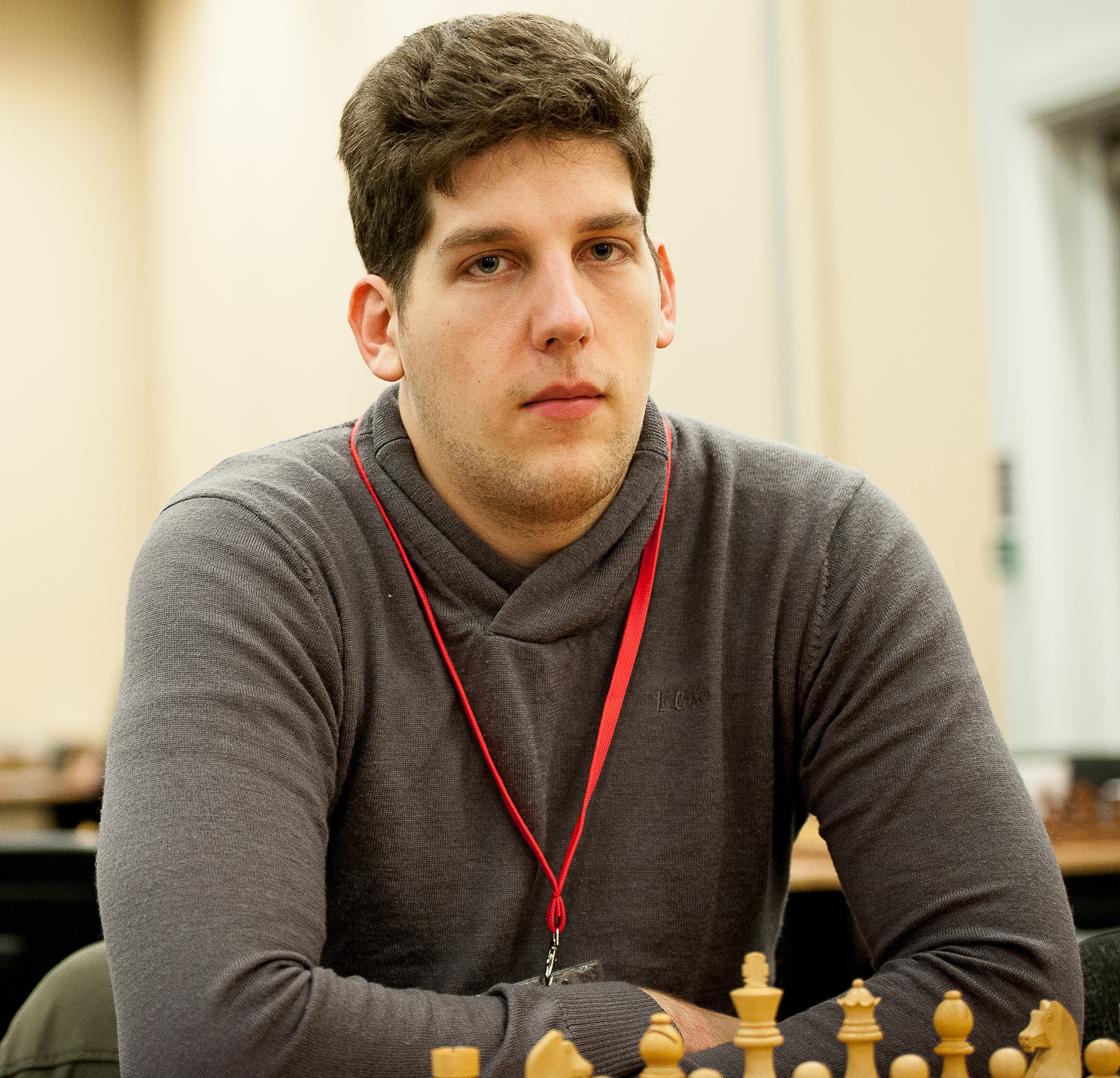

Personal information
- Born: June 2, 1991 (age 35) Kalocsa, Hungary

Chess career
- Country: Hungary
- Title: Grandmaster (2013)
- FIDE rating: 2494 (July 2026)
- Peak rating: 2533 (June 2019)

Tamas Fodor Jr. is a Hungarian chess grandmaster.

== Chess career ==
He achieved the Grandmaster title in 2013, earning his norms at the:

- European Individual Chess Championship in March 2012 at Plovdiv
- Caissa GM tournament in September 2012 at Kecskemet

In September 2014, he tied for first place with Sagar Shah, Ferenc Berkes, and Viacheslav Zakhartsov in the Dresden Open, ultimately being ranked third after tiebreaks.

In December 2023, he finished in fourth place at the Hungarian Chess Championship.
