= Roven Vogel =

German chess grandmaster (born 2000)

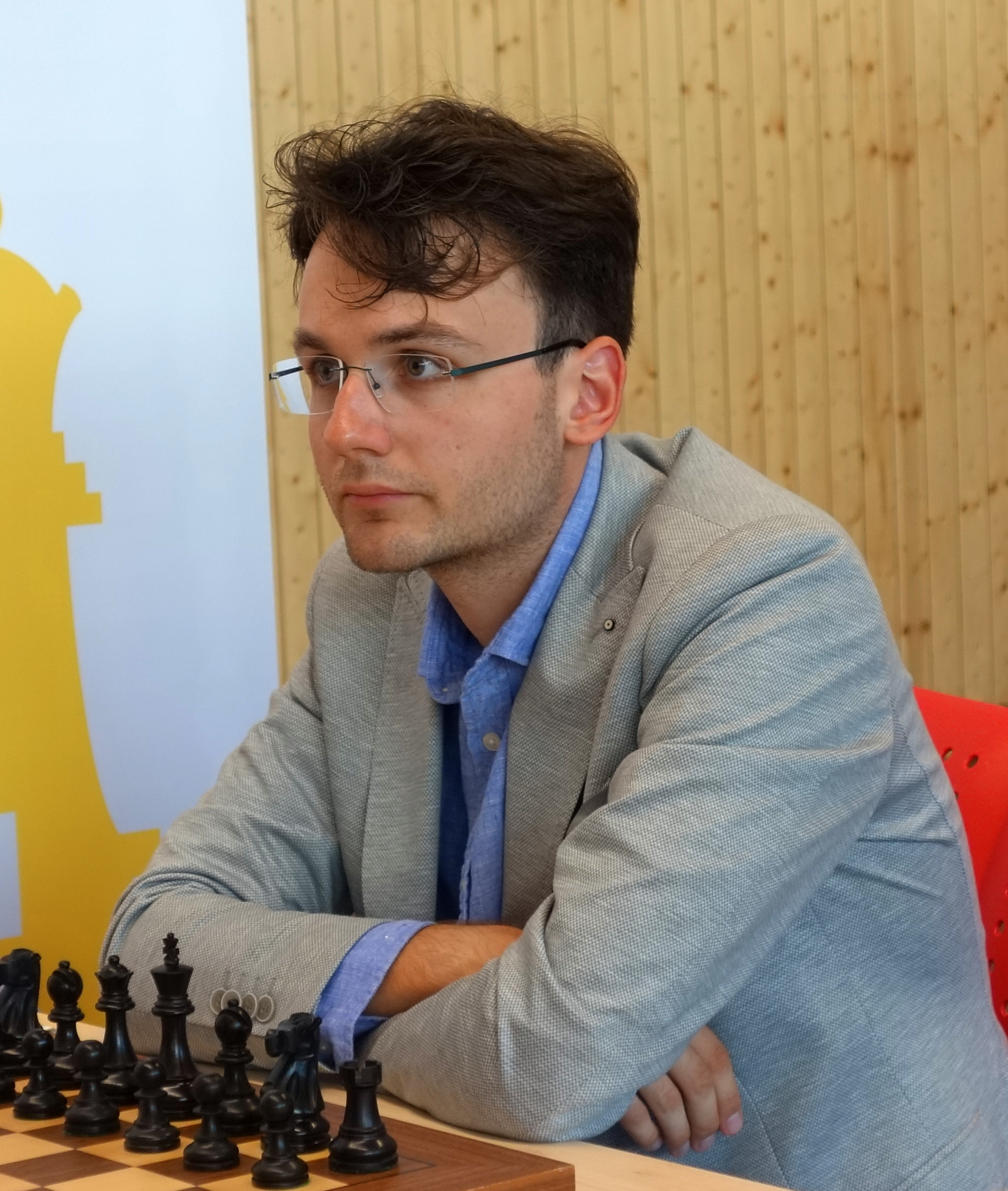
- Vogel in 2024

Personal information
- Born: July 17, 2000 (age 25) Oschatz, Germany

Chess career
- Country: Germany
- Title: Grandmaster (2024)
- FIDE rating: 2499 (July 2026)
- Peak rating: 2559 (September 2024)

Roven Vogel is a German chess grandmaster.

== Chess career ==
Vogel was coached by Peter Kahn and Henrik Teske.

In November 2015, Vogel won the U16 World Youth Chess Championship in Porto Carras by defeating Parham Maghsoodloo in the final game.

In October 2023, Vogel earned his second GM norm by winning the UKA Wolfgang Uhlmann Memorial Tournament with a score of 7/9, ahead of runner-up Mihail Marin, who finished with 5.5/9.

In November 2023, Vogel earned his final GM norm at the Open Bavarian Championship, where he finished third behind Jiří Štoček and Maxime Lagarde.

In January 2024, Vogel's rating surpassed 2500, earning him the Grandmaster title.
