= Liran Zhou =

American chess player (born 2008)

Personal information
- Born: April 22, 2008 (age 18) New York City, U.S.

Chess career
- Country: United States
- Title: International Master (2023)
- Peak rating: 2409 (August 2022)

Liran Zhou is an American chess player.

== Chess career ==
In August 2017, Zhou broke Christopher Yoo's record for being the youngest American national master after defeating Lawyer Times in the Continental Open and crossing 2200 in USCF ratings. He was 9 years, 3 months, and 22 days old, while Yoo had achieved the master title at 9 years and 11 months.

In September 2017, Zhou was the U10 World Youth Champion, finishing one point ahead of fellow American player Arthur Xu.

In January 2018, he won the Elementary section of the Greater NY Scholastics Championship, winning all of his games.

In September 2019, Zhou became the U12 World Youth Champion, finishing half a point ahead of runner-up Chen Yuan.
