= Chess Magazine =

British magazine

- May 2011 issue
- Categories: Chess
- Frequency: Monthly
- Founder: Baruch Harold Wood
- Founded: 1935
- Company: Chess and Bridge Limited
- Country: United Kingdom
- Based in: London
- Language: English
- Website: www.chess.co.uk
- ISSN: 0964-6221

CHESS Magazine (ISSN 0964-6221), also called CHESS and previously called CHESS Monthly, is a chess magazine published monthly in the United Kingdom by Chess and Bridge Limited. CHESS was founded by Baruch Harold Wood in 1935 in Sutton Coldfield. Wood edited it until 1988, when it was taken over by Pergamon Press and changed its name to Pergamon Chess. It became Macmillan Chess in 1989 and Maxwell Macmillan Chess Monthly in 1991. Current executive editor Malcolm Pein purchased Chess and Bridge from the Robert Maxwell estate.

== Staff ==
- Richard Palliser (IM and Editor)
- Byron Jacobs (Editor)
- John Saunders (Associate Editor)
- Malcolm Pein (IM and Executive Editor)
- Contributors include Grandmaster (GM) Jon Speelman, GM Michael Adams, GM Jacob Aagaard, GM Daniel King, GM John Emms, IM Andrew Greet, IM Yochanan Afek, Peter Lalic and Janis Nisii.
- Former Executive Editor, Writer and Rewriter for 20 years Jimmy Adams FM
