= Oropesa del Mar =

- Municipality
- Orpesa/Oropesa del Mar
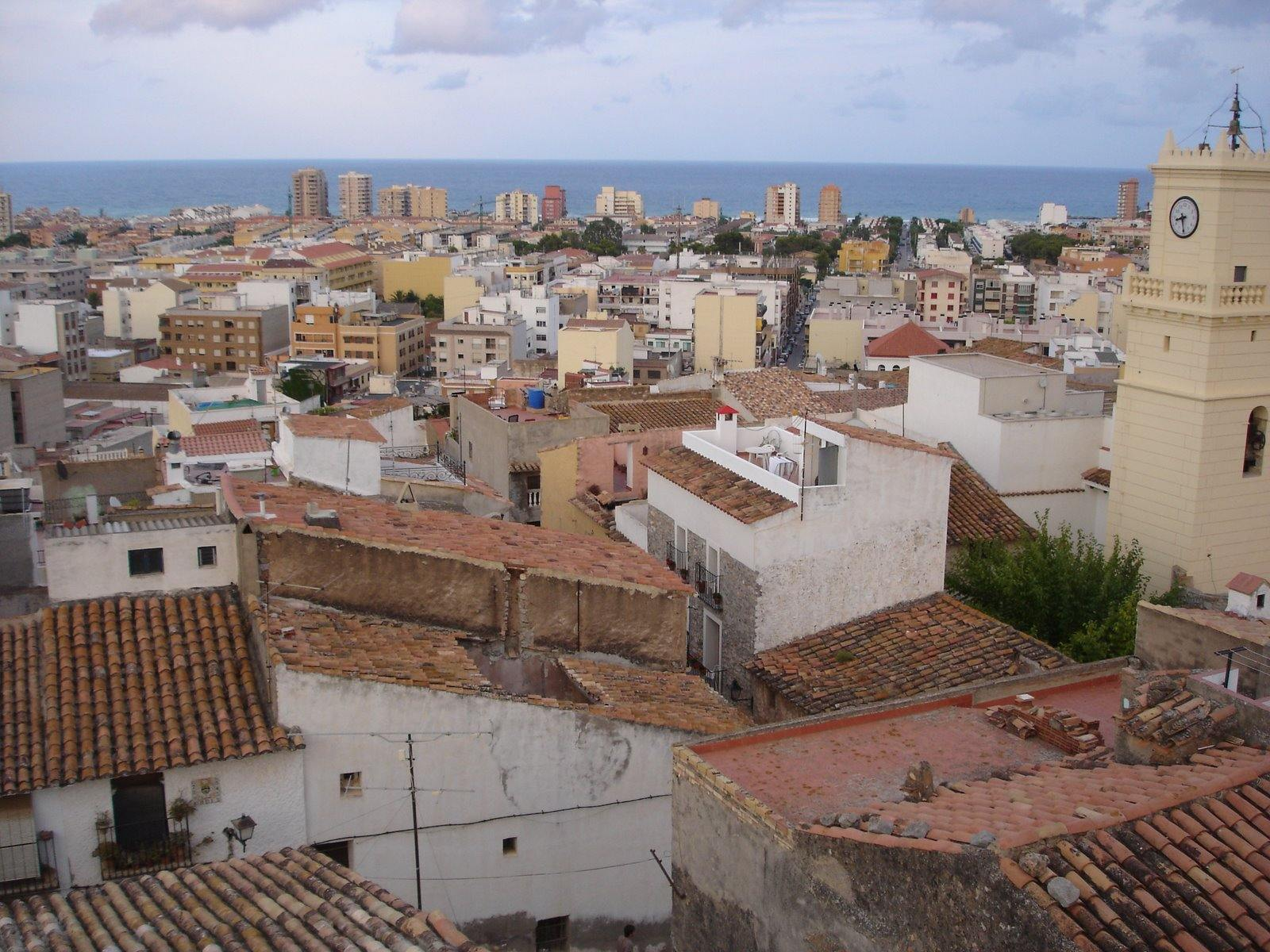
- Oropesa panorama

- Flag Coat of arms

- Location in Spain Oropesa del Mar (Valencian Community) Oropesa del Mar (Spain)
- Coordinates: 40°5′32″N 0°8′2″E
- Country: Spain
- Autonomous community: Valencian Community
- Province: Castellón
- Comarca: Plana Alta
- Judicial district: Castellón de la Plana

Government
  - Mayor: Araceli (2021) (Ciudadanos)

Area
  - Total: 26.4 km^{2} (10.2 sq mi)
- Elevation: 33 m (108 ft)

Population (2025-01-01)
  - Total: 12,640
  - Density: 479/km^{2} (1,240/sq mi)
- Demonym(s): Oropesino, oropesina
- Time zone: UTC+1 (CET)
  - Summer (DST): UTC+2 (CEST)
- Postal code: 12594
- Official language(s): Valencian and Spanish
- Website: Official website

Oropesa del Mar (Valencian: Orpesa) is a municipality in the comarca of Plana Alta in the Valencian Community, Spain.

== See also ==
- List of municipalities in Castellón
