= American Cup (chess) =

Annual chess tournament held in St. Louis, United States

The American Cup is an annual invitational double-elimination chess tournament in St. Louis, Missouri, United States.

== Winners ==
=== Open Tournament ===
Year	Winner	Runner-up
2022	Fabiano Caruana	Levon Aronian
2023	Hikaru Nakamura	Wesley So
2024	Levon Aronian	Wesley So
2025	Hikaru Nakamura	Fabiano Caruana
2026	Wesley So	Levon Aronian

=== Women's Tournament ===
Year	Winner	Runner-up
2022	Irina Krush	Alice Lee
2023	Irina Krush	Alice Lee
2024	Alice Lee	Irina Krush
2025	Alice Lee	Tatev Abrahamyan
2026	Alice Lee	Carissa Yip

== Format ==
The tournament is 8 player double elimination tournament, featuring 8 of the strongest players in the United States. The championship bracket is played with a time control of 90 minutes, with a 30 second increment throughout for 2 games. The elimination bracket is played with a time control of 25 minutes and a 10 second increment for 2 games. If needed two tiebreak games of 10 minutes with a 5 second increment are played followed by an Armageddon game if necessary. The 2023 edition had 2 blitz games after the initial 10 minute rapid games if still tied before going to Armageddon.

== Tournament ==
=== 2022 Bracket ===
The inaugural edition was held from April 20–28, 2022. Levon Aronian, Fabiano Caruana, Lenier Dominguez, Wesley So, Sam Shankland, Sam Sevian, Jeffery Xiong, and Ray Robson participated in the inaugural event. The tournament was won by Fabiano Caruana.

Champion Round 1	Champion Round 2	Champion Final	Final
1	(United States) Levon Aronian	2½
8	(United States) Ray Robson	1½
1	(United States) Levon Aronian	½
4	(United States) Lenier Dominguez	1½
5	(United States) Sam Shankland	1½
4	(United States) Lenier Dominguez	2½
4	(United States) Lenier Dominguez	½
2	(United States) Fabiano Caruana	1½
3	(United States) Wesley So	½
6	(United States) Sam Sevian	1½
6	(United States) Sam Sevian	1
2	(United States) Fabiano Caruana	3
7	(United States) Jeffery Xiong	2
2	(United States) Fabiano Caruana	3	2	(United States) Fabiano Caruana	1½
1	(United States) Levon Aronian	½
Elimination Round 1	Elimination Round 2	Elimination Round 3	Elimination Final
8	(United States) Ray Robson	2½
5	(United States) Sam Shankland	2	6	(United States) Sam Sevian	1½	1	(United States) Levon Aronian	2½
8	(United States) Ray Robson	3	8	(United States) Ray Robson	0	4	(United States) Lenier Dominguez	1½
1	(United States) Levon Aronian	2
3	(United States) Wesley So	½
3	(United States) Wesley So	1½	1	(United States) Levon Aronian	1½
7	(United States) Jeffery Xiong	½

=== 2023 Bracket ===
The 2nd edition of the tournament was held from March 17th-March 26th. Hikaru Nakamura, Fabiano Caruana, Wesley So, Levon Aronian, Lenier Dominguez, Sam Shankland, Sam Sevian and Ray Robson participated in this edition. The tournament was won by Hikaru Nakamura.

Champion Round 1	Champion Round 2	Champion Final	Final	Final Rematch
1	(United States) Hikaru Nakamura	1½
8	(United States) Sam Sevian	½
1	(United States) Hikaru Nakamura	1½
5	(United States) Lenier Dominguez	½
5	(United States) Lenier Dominguez	2½
4	(United States) Levon Aronian	1½
1	(United States) Hikaru Nakamura	4
3	(United States) Wesley So	2
3	(United States) Wesley So	2½
6	(United States) Sam Shankland	1½
3	(United States) Wesley So	2½
2	(United States) Fabiano Caruana	1½
7	(United States) Ray Robson	1½
2	(United States) Fabiano Caruana	2½	1	(United States) Hikaru Nakamura	1	1	(United States) Hikaru Nakamura	2½
3	(United States) Wesley So	3	3	(United States) Wesley So	1½
Elimination Round 1	Elimination Round 2	Elimination Round 3	Elimination Final
4	(United States) Levon Aronian	4
8	(United States) Sam Sevian	½	2	(United States) Fabiano Caruana	3	3	(United States) Wesley So	2½
4	(United States) Levon Aronian	1½	5	(United States) Lenier Dominguez	½	4	(United States) Levon Aronian	1½
4	(United States) Levon Aronian	1½
5	(United States) Lenier Dominguez	1½
6	(United States) Sam Shankland	3½	6	(United States) Sam Shankland	½
7	(United States) Ray Robson	2½

=== 2024 Bracket ===
The 3rd edition of the tournament was held from March 12th-March 21st.

Champion Round 1	Champion Round 2	Champion Final	Final
4	(United States) Levon Aronian	4
5	(United States) Sam Sevian	2
4	(United States) Levon Aronian	4
1	(United States) Fabiano Caruana	2
1	(United States) Fabiano Caruana	2½
8	(United States) Grigoriy Oparin	½
4	(United States) Levon Aronian	2½
6	(United States) Ray Robson	½
2	(United States) Wesley So	2½
7	(United States) Sam Shankland	½
2	(United States) Wesley So	1
6	(United States) Ray Robson	3
3	(United States) Lenier Dominguez	1½
6	(United States) Ray Robson	2½	4	(United States) Levon Aronian	2½
2	(United States) Wesley So	1½
Elimination Round 1	Elimination Round 2	Elimination Round 3	Elimination Final
2	(United States) Wesley So	3
5	(United States) Sam Sevian	3	5	(United States) Sam Sevian	1	6	(United States) Ray Robson	2
8	(United States) Grigoriy Oparin	1	2	(United States) Wesley So	3½	2	(United States) Wesley So	4
1	(United States) Fabiano Caruana	2½
1	(United States) Fabiano Caruana	4
7	(United States) Sam Shankland	3	3	(United States) Lenier Dominguez	2
3	(United States) Lenier Dominguez	5

=== 2025 Bracket ===
The 4th edition of the tournament was held from March 15–24.

Champion Round 1	Champion Round 2	Champion Final	Final
1	(United States) Hikaru Nakamura 2802	3½
8	(United States) Abhimanyu Mishra 2600	2½
1	(United States) Hikaru Nakamura	1½
5	(United States) Leinier Dominguez	½
4	(United States) Wesley So 2748	3
5	(United States) Leinier Dominguez 2741	4
1	(United States) Hikaru Nakamura	2½
2	(United States) Fabiano Caruana	1½
3	(United States) Levon Aronian 2748	4
6	(United States) Sam Sevian 2692	2
3	(United States) Levon Aronian	2½
2	(United States) Fabiano Caruana	3½
2	(United States) Fabiano Caruana 2783	2½
7	(United States) Ray Robson 2689	1½	1	(United States) Hikaru Nakamura	1½
2	(United States) Fabiano Caruana	½
Elimination Round 1	Elimination Round 2	Elimination Round 3	Elimination Final
3	(United States) Levon Aronian	2½
8	(United States) Abhimanyu Mishra	½	4	(United States) Wesley So	1½	2	(United States) Fabiano Caruana	3
4	(United States) Wesley So	1½	3	(United States) Levon Aronian	2	3	(United States) Levon Aronian	1
6	(United States) Sam Sevian	0
5	(United States) Leinier Dominguez	2½
6	(United States) Sam Sevian	3	6	(United States) Sam Sevian	3½
7	(United States) Ray Robson	1

=== 2026 Bracket ===
The 5th edition of the tournament was held from March 2–13.

Champion Round 1	Champion Round 2	Champion Final	Final
1	(United States) Fabiano Caruana 2795	1½
8	(United States) Abhimanyu Mishra 2629	½
1	(United States) Fabiano Caruana	2½
5	(United States) Awonder Liang	1½
4	(United States) Levon Aronian 2729	1½
5	(United States) Awonder Liang 2719	2½
1	(United States) Fabiano Caruana	1½
2	(United States) Wesley So	2½
3	(United States) Leinier Domínguez 2738	½
6	(United States) Sam Sevian 2688	1½
6	(United States) Sam Sevian	1½
2	(United States) Wesley So	2½
2	(United States) Wesley So 2753	2½
7	(United States) Ray Robson 2650	1½	2	(United States) Wesley So	1½
4	(United States) Levon Aronian	½
Elimination Round 1	Elimination Round 2	Elimination Round 3	Elimination Final
4	(United States) Levon Aronian	1½
8	(United States) Abhimanyu Mishra	½	6	(United States) Sam Sevian	½	1	(United States) Fabiano Caruana	1½
4	(United States) Levon Aronian	1½	4	(United States) Levon Aronian	2½	4	(United States) Levon Aronian	2½
5	(United States) Awonder Liang	1½
3	(United States) Leinier Domínguez	1½
3	(United States) Leinier Domínguez	2	5	(United States) Awonder Liang	2½
7	(United States) Ray Robson	0

== Women's American Cup ==
Running simultaneously with the main tournament a women's tournament is held, featuring 8 of the strongest women chess players in the United States.

=== 2022 Women's Tournament Bracket ===
Irina Krush, Anna Zatonskih, Stavroula Tsolakidou, Gulrukhbegim Tokhirjonova, Katerina Nemcova, Alice Lee, Tatev Abrahamyan, and Ruiyang Yan. The inaugural Women's tournament was won by Irina Krush. 12-year-old Alice Lee finished as the runner-up.

Women's Champion Round 1	Women's Champion Round 2	Women's Champion Final	Women's Final
1	(United States) Irina Krush	1½
8	(United States) Ruiyang Yan	½
1	(United States) Irina Krush	1½
5	(United States) Gulrukhbegim Tokhirjonova	½
4	(United States) Katerina Nemcova	½
5	(United States) Gulrukhbegim Tokhirjonova	1½
1	(United States) Irina Krush	1½
6	(United States) Alice Lee	½
3	(Greece) Stavroula Tsolakidou	1
6	(United States) Alice Lee	3
6	(United States) Alice Lee	2
7	(United States) Tatev Abrahamyan	0
2	(United States) Anna Zatonskih	1
7	(United States) Tatev Abrahamyan	3	1	(United States) Irina Krush	1½
6	(United States) Alice Lee	½
Women's Elimination Round 1	Women's Elimination Round 2	Women's Elimination Round 3	Women's Elimination Final
4	(United States) Katerina Nemcova	0
4	(United States) Katerina Nemcova	3	7	(United States) Tatev Abrahamyan	2	7	(United States) Tatev Abrahamyan	2
8	(United States) Ruiyang Yan	2	7	(United States) Tatev Abrahamyan	3	6	(United States) Alice Lee	3
5	(United States) Gulrukhbegim Tokhirjonova	1
5	(United States) Gulrukhbegim Tokhirjonova	2
2	(United States) Anna Zatonskih	1½	3	(Greece) Stavroula Tsolakidou	0
3	(Greece) Stavroula Tsolakidou	2½

=== 2023 Women's Tournament Bracket ===
The women's field for the 2023 edition includes Irina Krush, Alice Lee, Anna Zatonskih, Gulrukhbegim Tokhirjonova, Katerina Nemcova, Nazi Paikidze, Atousa Pourkashiyan, and Tatev Abrahamyan. Again, Irina Krush won before Alice Lee.

Women's Champion Round 1	Women's Champion Round 2	Women's Champion Final	Women's Final
1	(United States) Irina Krush	2
8	(United States) Tatev Abrahamyan	0
1	(United States) Irina Krush	1½
4	(United States) Gulrukhbegim Tokhirjonova	½
4	(United States) Gulrukhbegim Tokhirjonova	2
5	(United States) Katerina Nemcova	0
1	(United States) Irina Krush	3
2	(United States) Alice Lee	1
3	(United States) Anna Zatonskih	½
6	(United States) Nazi Paikidze	1½
6	(United States) Nazi Paikidze	½
2	(United States) Alice Lee	1½
2	(United States) Alice Lee	2
7	(United States) Atousa Pourkashiyan	0	1	(United States) Irina Krush	2½
2	(United States) Alice Lee	1½
Women's Elimination Round 1	Women's Elimination Round 2	Women's Elimination Round 3	Women's Elimination Final
8	(United States) Tatev Abrahamyan	1½
8	(United States) Tatev Abrahamyan	2	6	(United States) Nazi Paikidze	½	6	(United States) Nazi Paikidze	1
5	(United States) Katerina Nemcova	0	6	(United States) Nazi Paikidze	2	2	(United States) Alice Lee	3
4	(United States) Gulrukhbegim Tokhirjonova	0
4	(United States) Gulrukhbegim Tokhirjonova	2
3	(United States) Anna Zatonskih	½	7	(United States) Atousa Pourkashiyan	0
7	(United States) Atousa Pourkashiyan	1½

=== 2024 Women's Tournament Bracket ===
The women's field for the 2024 edition includes Anna Zatonskih, Nazi Paikidze, Irina Krush, Zoey Tang, Gulrukhbegim Tokhirjonova, Jennifer Yu, Alice Lee and Jennifer Yu. Alice Lee defeated Irina Krush in the finals after a tied rapid match.

Women's Champion Round 1	Women's Champion Round 2	Women's Champion Final	Women's Final	Women's Final Rematch
1	(United States) Anna Zatonskih	½
8	(United States) Nazi Paikidze	2½
8	(United States) Nazi Paikidze	1
4	(United States) Irina Krush	3
4	(United States) Irina Krush	3
5	(United States) Zoey Tang	1
4	(United States) Irina Krush	2½
2	(United States) Alice Lee	½
3	(United States) Gulrukhbegim Tokhirjonova	2½
6	(United States) Jennifer Yu	½
3	(United States) Gulrukhbegim Tokhirjonova	0
2	(United States) Alice Lee	3
2	(United States) Alice Lee	2½
7	(United States) Tatev Abrahamyan	½	4	(United States) Irina Krush	½	4	(United States) Irina Krush	2
2	(United States) Alice Lee	2½	2	(United States) Alice Lee	4
Women's Elimination Round 1	Women's Elimination Round 2	Women's Elimination Round 3	Women's Elimination Final
3	(United States) Gulrukhbegim Tokhirjonova	2½
1	(United States) Anna Zatonskih	1½	5	(United States) Zoey Tang	½	2	(United States) Alice Lee	3
5	(United States) Zoey Tang	2½	3	(United States) Gulrukhbegim Tokhirjonova	3	3	(United States) Gulrukhbegim Tokhirjonova	1
6	(United States) Jennifer Yu	1
8	(United States) Nazi Paikidze	4½
6	(United States) Jennifer Yu	2½	6	(United States) Jennifer Yu	5½
7	(United States) Tatev Abrahamyan	½

=== 2025 Women's Tournament Bracket ===
Champion Round 1	Champion Round 2	Champion Final	Final
1	(United States) Carissa Yip 2408	2
8	(United States) Thalia Cervantes 2292	0
1	(United States) Carissa Yip	1
5	(United States) Tatev Abrahamyan	3
4	(United States) Anna Zatonskih 2315	½
5	(United States) Tatev Abrahamyan 2310	1½
5	(United States) Tatev Abrahamyan	½
2	(United States) Alice Lee	1½
3	(United States) Irina Krush 2378	1½
6	(United States) Atousa Pourkashiyan 2297	½
3	(United States) Irina Krush	½
2	(United States) Alice Lee	1½
2	(United States) Alice Lee 2386	3
7	(United States) Nazi Paikidze 2294	1	2	(United States) Alice Lee	3
5	(United States) Tatev Abrahamyan	1
Elimination Round 1	Elimination Round 2	Elimination Round 3	Elimination Final
3	(United States) Irina Krush	3
8	(United States) Thalia Cervantes	0	4	(United States) Anna Zatonskih	1	5	(United States) Tatev Abrahamyan	2
4	(United States) Anna Zatonskih	2	3	(United States) Irina Krush	2	3	(United States) Irina Krush	0
7	(United States) Nazi Paikidze	0
1	(United States) Carissa Yip	0
6	(United States) Atousa Pourkashiyan	½	7	(United States) Nazi Paikidze	2
7	(United States) Nazi Paikidze	1½

=== 2026 Women's Tournament Bracket ===
Champion Round 1	Champion Round 2	Champion Final	Final	Final Rematch
1	(United States) Carissa Yip 2486	1½
8	(United States) Anna Zatonskih 2322	½
1	(United States) Carissa Yip	1½
5	(United States) Tatev Abrahamyan	½
4	(United States) Anna Sargsyan 2380	½
5	(United States) Tatev Abrahamyan 2379	1½
1	(United States) Carissa Yip	1
3	(United States) Alice Lee	3
3	(United States) Alice Lee 2399	2
6	(United States) Rachael Li 2375	0
3	(United States) Alice Lee	1½
7	(United States) Zoey Tang	½
2	(United States) Irina Krush 2402	2½
7	(United States) Zoey Tang 2366	3½	1	(United States) Carissa Yip	4	1	(United States) Carissa Yip	½
3	(United States) Alice Lee	3	3	(United States) Alice Lee	1½
Elimination Round 1	Elimination Round 2	Elimination Round 3	Elimination Final
4	(United States) Anna Sargsyan	1½
8	(United States) Anna Zatonskih	3	7	(United States) Zoey Tang	½	1	(United States) Carissa Yip	2
4	(United States) Anna Sargsyan	4	4	(United States) Anna Sargsyan	2½	5	(United States) Tatev Abrahamyan	0
5	(United States) Tatev Abrahamyan	3½
5	(United States) Tatev Abrahamyan	1½
6	(United States) Rachael Li	3	6	(United States) Rachael Li	½
2	(United States) Irina Krush	1
