= Chess in New York (state) =

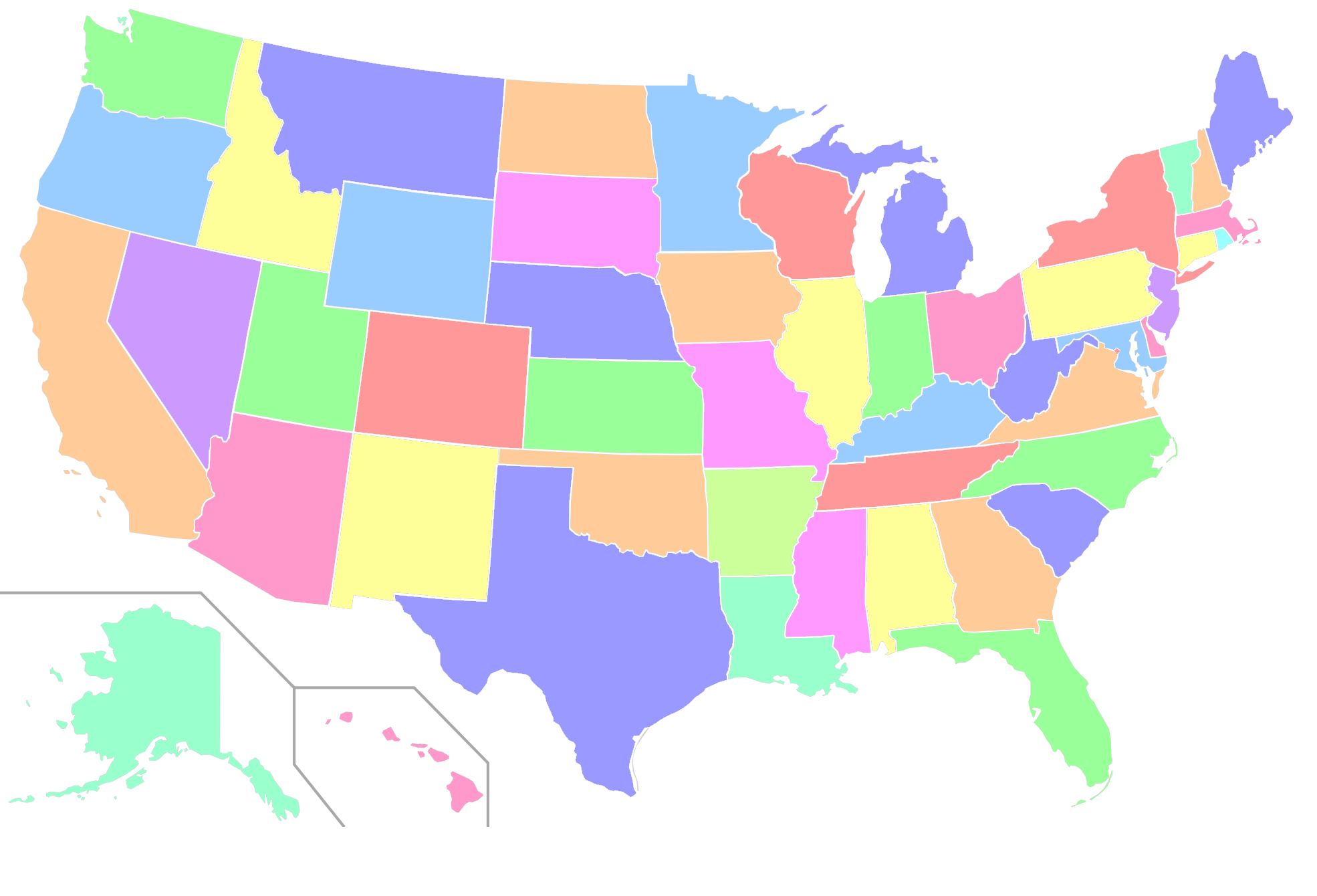
- Top Player: Hikaru Nakamura (2872 USCF, 2792 FIDE)
- Champion: William Graif
- USCF Affiliate: New York State Chess Association
- Active Players: 8,394

As of May 2 2026, New York has 8,394 active players registered with the United States Chess Federation. The current USCF New York state affiliate is the New York State Chess Association.

== History ==
The history of chess in New York reflects the broader development of organized chess in the United States. As chess clubs, tournaments, publications, and scholastic programs expanded, New York became a central setting for organized play. Throughout the state's history, major international chess events have taken place in New York City. Numerous top-rated chess players have called New York home including Hikaru Nakamura, Bobby Fischer, and Garry Kasparov. Chess has also developed as part of the state's public culture, including street chess in locations such as Washington Square Park and Union Square. The state's chess history began to take shape during the nineteenth century, as clubs and organized competitions became more established.

=== Early development ===
Manhattan Chess Club
- Founded: 1877
- Dissolved: 2002
- Location: Manhattan, New York City, New York
- Country: United States

The Manhattan Chess Club, the oldest chess club in New York, was founded in 1877. Across the United States, the Manhattan Chess Club was the second-oldest chess club behind only the Mechanics' Institute Chess Club in San Francisco, California. Stories about the club appear in The Bobby Fischer I Knew And Other Stories by Denker and Larry Parr.

In 1878, the Western New York and Northern Pennsylvania Chess Association was founded. The organization changed its name to the New York State Chess Association in 1886.

From 1886 to 1915, NYSCA held two tournaments each year. The first event was the annual state championship, which almost always took place on George Washington's birthday in New York City. The second tournament would take place upstate during the summer. Despite the first annual tournament being the state championship, the summer tournament usually garnered more attention.

Marshall Chess Club
- Type: USCF Gold Affiliate
- Founded: 1915
- Founder: Frank Marshall
- Location: Greenwich Village, New York City
- Country: United States
- Website: Official Website

In 1915, a group of chess players led by Frank Marshall founded the Marshall Chess Club. Marshall wanted to establish a central meeting area for chess players in New York.

In 1916, NYSCA combined its two annual tournaments into a single multi-day state championship.

In 1924, the Manhattan Chess Club organized the New York international tournaments of 1924. The event was ultimately won by Emanuel Lasker. In 1927, the chess club hosted another chess tournament that José Capablanca won.

In 1964, Bill Goichberg founded the New York City Chess Association. The organization became the first organizer to hold USCF-rated scholastic tournaments in 1966. The NYCA later changed its name to the Continental Chess Association in 1968, widening its scope to other areas. Several major recurring scholastic USCF tournament began under this organization, including the National High School Championship (1969), the National Junior High Championship (1973), the National Elementary Championship (1976), and the National Scholastic K-12 Grade Championship (1991).

=== Contemporary chess ===
In 2002, the Manhattan Chess Club closed.

In 2013, Russian chess grandmaster and former world champion Garry Kasparov fled Russia to New York City, fearing political persecution for his criticism of Russian President Vladimir Putin.

During Spring Break 2026, Impact Coaching Network hosted a chess camp for youth with at least a 1200 USCF rating.

In 2025, 9th Annual New York State Girls Championship broke attendance records, with 620 girls competing in the event across 73 teams.

== Competitors ==
As of May 2026, the following people are the top rated active USCF players from New York:

Position	Name	USCF Rating	USCF Titles
1	Hikaru Nakamura	2872	Original Life Master, National Master, Life Senior Master (norms-based)
2	Robert Hess	2677	Original Life Master, National Master, Life Senior Master (norms-based)
3	Brewington Hardaway	2617	Original Life Master, National Master, Life Senior Master (norms-based)
4	Lev Alburt	2609	Original Life Master, National Master, Life Senior Master (norms-based)
5	Jaan Ehlvest	2604	Original Life Master, National Master, Life Senior Master (norms-based)
6	David Brodsky	2597	Original Life Master, National Master, Life Senior Master (norms-based)
7	Nico Chasin	2591	Original Life Master, National Master, Life Senior Master (norms-based)
8	Aleksandr Lenderman	2589	Original Life Master, National Master, Life Senior Master (norms-based)
9	Nicolas Checa	2585	Original Life Master, National Master, Life Senior Master (norms-based)
10	Liam Henry Putnam	2581	Original Life Master, National Master, Life Senior Master (norms-based)

Other top New York chess players who aren't currently active USCF members include GM Evgeniy Najer (2721 Rating), GM Artashes Minasian (2697 Rating), and French GM Laurent Fressinet (2697 Rating).

== List of state champions (1878–2024) ==
No.	Year	Winner(s)	Site	Notes
1	1878	Judge James R. Cox	Auburn	
2	1879	H.A. Richmond	Auburn	
3	1880	Rev. Samuel R. Calthrop	Syracuse	
4	1881	Rev. John Costello	Tunkhannock, Pennsylvania	This championship took place outside of New York State because NYSCA used to be "The Western New York and Northern Pennsylvania Chess Association."
5	1882	George H. Thornton	Buffalo	
6	January 1883	Rev. Samuel R. Cathrop	Elmira	
7	December 1883	Niles D. Luce	Elmira	This contest is not on the trophy, but appears on official list published in 1945.
8	1884	Niles D. Luce (2)	Elmira	
9	1885	Niles D. Luce (3)	Elmira	
10	1886	Dr. J.M. Cassety	Albany	
11	1887	Eugene Delmar	New York City	
12	1888	None		No Contest
13	1889	Samuel Lipscheutz	New York City	
14	1890	Eugene Delmar (2)	New York City	
15	1891	Eugene Delmar (3)	New York City	
16	1892	Albert B. Hodges	New York City	
17	1893	Albert B. Hodges (2)	New York City	
18	1894	Albert B. Hodges (3)	New York City	
19	1895	David G. Baird	New York City	
20	1896	Nicolai Jasnogrodsky	New York City	
21	1897	Eugene Delmar (4)	New York City	
22	1898	Gustav H. Koehler	New York City	
23	1899	Samuel Lipscheutz (2) & William M. DeVisser	New York City	Tie; DeVisser considered the moral victor
24	1900	Frank J. Marshall	New York City	
25	1901	Julius Finn	New York City	
26	1902	Berthold Lasker	New York City	
27	1903	Otto Roething	New York City	
28	1904	None		No Contest
29	1905	None		No Contest
30	1906	Hermann Helms	New York City	
31	1907	Julius Finn (2)	New York City	
32	1908	Julius Finn (3)	New York City	
33	1909	Clarence S. Howell	New York City	
34	1910	Jose R. Capablanca	New York City	
35	1911	Paul F. Johner	New York City	There were no restrictions on non-New Yorkers becoming state champion. Later rules would change this.
36	1912	Jacob Rosenthal	New York City	
37	1913	Leonard B. Meyer & George J. Beihoff	New York City	Tie
38	1914	Roy T. Black	New York City	
39	1915	Abraham Kupchik	New York City	
40	1916	Harold E. Jennings	Buffalo	
41	1917	Oscar Chajes	Rochester	
42	1918	Kenneth S. Howard	Rochester	
43	1919	Abraham Kupchik (2)	Troy	
44	1920	Jacob Bernstein	Albany	
45	1921	Jacob Bernstein (2)	Syracuse	
46	1922	Jacob Bernstein (3)	Buffalo	
47	1923	Rudolph Smirka	Syracuse	
48	1924	Carlos Torre	Rochester	
49	1925	Hermann Helms (2)	Buffalo	
50	1926	Milton Hanauer	Rome	
51	1927	Rudolph Smirka (2)	Rome	
52	1928	Anthony E. Santasiere	Buffalo	
53	1929	Herman Steiner	Buffalo	
54	1930	Anthony E. Santasiere (2)	Utica	
55	1931	Fred Reinfeld	Rome	
56	1932	Nathan Grossman	Rome	
57	1933	Fred Reinfeld (2)	Syracuse	
58	1934	Robert Levenstein	Syracuse	
59	1935	Isaac I. Kashdan	Binghamton	
60	1936	Isaac I. Kashdan (2)	Poughkeepsie	
61	1937	David S. Polland	Cazenovia	
62	1938	Arnold S. Denker	Cazenovia	
63	1939	Arnold S. Denker (2)	Hamilton	
64	1940	Robert Willman	Hamilton	
65	1941	Reuben Fine	Hamilton	
66	1942	Israel A. Horowitz	Cazenovia	
67	1943	Israel A. Horowitz (2)	Syracuse	
68	1944	None		No Contest
69	1945	George M. Kramer	Saratoga Springs	
70	1946	Anthony E. Santasiere (3)	Cazenovia	
71	1947	Albert S. Pinkus	Endicott	
72	1948	Larry M. Evans	Endicott	
73	1949	Max Pavey	Rochester	
74	1950	Eliot S. Hearst	Binghamton	
75	1951	James Sherwin	Syracuse	
76	1952	John W. Collins	Cazenovia	
77	1953	Hans Berliner	Cazenovia	
78	1954	William Lombardy	Binghamton	
79	1955	Edmar Mednis	Cazenovia	
80	1956	Anthony E. Santasiere (4)	Buffalo	
81	1957	August Rankis	Binghamton	
82	1958	Mitchell Saltzberg	Cazenovia	
83	1959	August Rankis (2)	Schenectady	
84	1960	Erich W. Marchand	Cazenovia	
85	1961	Herbert Seidman	Cazenovia	
86	1962	Pal C. Benko	Poughkeepsie	
87	1963	George Mauer & Mitchell Saltzberg (2)	Cazenovia	Tie
88	1964	Duncan Suttles	Ithaca	
89	1965	John T. Westbrock	Ithaca	
90	1966	Raul Benedicto	Syracuse	
91	1967	Erich W. Marchand (2)	Canandaigua	
92	1968	Roger B. Johnson	Schenectady	
93	1969	Erich W. Marchand (3)	Corning	
94	1970	Erich W. Marchand (4)	Rochester	
95	1971	Herbert Seidman (2)	Syracuse	
96	1972	Ken Rogoff	Syracuse	
97	1973	Jonathan Tisdall	Buffalo	
98	1974	Paul Jacklyn	Albany	
99	1975	Sunil Weeramantry	Albany	
100	1976	Leonid Shamkovich	Albany	
101	1977	Leonid Shamkovich (2)	Albany	
102	1978	Edward Formanek	Syracuse	
103	1979	Vitaly Zaltsman	Albany	
104	1980	Roman Dzindzichashvili	New York City	
105	1981	Ken Regan	New York City	
106	1982	Jay Bonin	Albany	
107	1983	Mikhail Zlotnikov	Albany	
108	1984	Maxim Dlugy	Syracuse	
109	1985	Joel Benjamin	Rockville Center	
110	1986	Anthony Renna, Joel Benjamin (2), & Walter Shipman	Binghamton	Tie
111	1987	Robert Byrne & Joel Benjamin (3)	Saratoga Springs	Tie
112	1988	Vince McCambridge	Rye	
113	1989	Michael Rohde	Albany	
114	1990	Roman Dzindzichashvili (2) & Joel Benjamin (4)	Kingston	Tie
115	1991	John Fedorowicz	Rockville Center	
116	1992	Joel Benjamin (5)	Saratoga Springs	
117	1993	Michael Rohde (2)	Saratoga Springs	
118	1994	Michael Rohde (3)	Saratoga Springs	
119	1995	Joel Benjamin (6) & Victor Frias	Saratoga Springs	Tie
120	1996	Ronald Burnett & Michael Rohde (4)	Saratoga Springs	Tie
121	1997	Jay Bonin (2)	Saratoga Springs	
122	1998	Ronald Burnett	Saratoga Springs	
123	1999	Jay Bonin (3)	Saratoga Springs	
124	2000	Joel Benjamin (7), Dmitry Schneider, & Daniel Edelman	Saratoga Springs	Tie
125	2001	Joel Benjamin (8), Sunil Weeramantry (2), Chuck Cadman	Rochester	Tie
126	2002	Joel Benjamin (9), Alex Stripunsky, Aaron Pixton, & Michael Rohde (5)	Kerhonkson	Tie
127	2003	Aaron Pixton (2)	Kerhonkson	
128	2004	Hikaru Nakamura	Kerhonkson	
129	2005	Gata Kamsky	Monticello	
130	2006	Teddy Coleman	Albany	
131	2007	Hikaru Nakamura (2)	Albany	
132	2008	Alex Lenderman	Albany	
133	2009	Giorgi Kacheishvili	Albany	
134	2010	Aleksandr Ostrovskiy	Albany	
135	2011	Michael Chiang	Albany	
136	2012	Raven Sturt	Albany	
137	2013	Nicolas Checa	Albany	
138	2014	Gata Kamsky (2)	Albany	
139	2015	Aleksandr Ostrovskiy (2)	Albany	
140	2016	Aleksandr Ostrovskiy (3)	Albany	
141	2017	Mark Paragua	Albany	
142	2018	Lev Paciorkowski	Albany	
143	2019	GM Oliver Barbosa	Albany	
144	2020	Lev Paciorkowski (2)	Internet Chess Club	Online
145	2021	FM Jason Liang	Albany	
146	2022	IM Jason Liang (2)	Albany	
147	2023	GM Djurabek Khamrakulov	Albany	
148	2024	FM William Graif	Albany	
