= North American Youth Chess Championship =

Chess competition

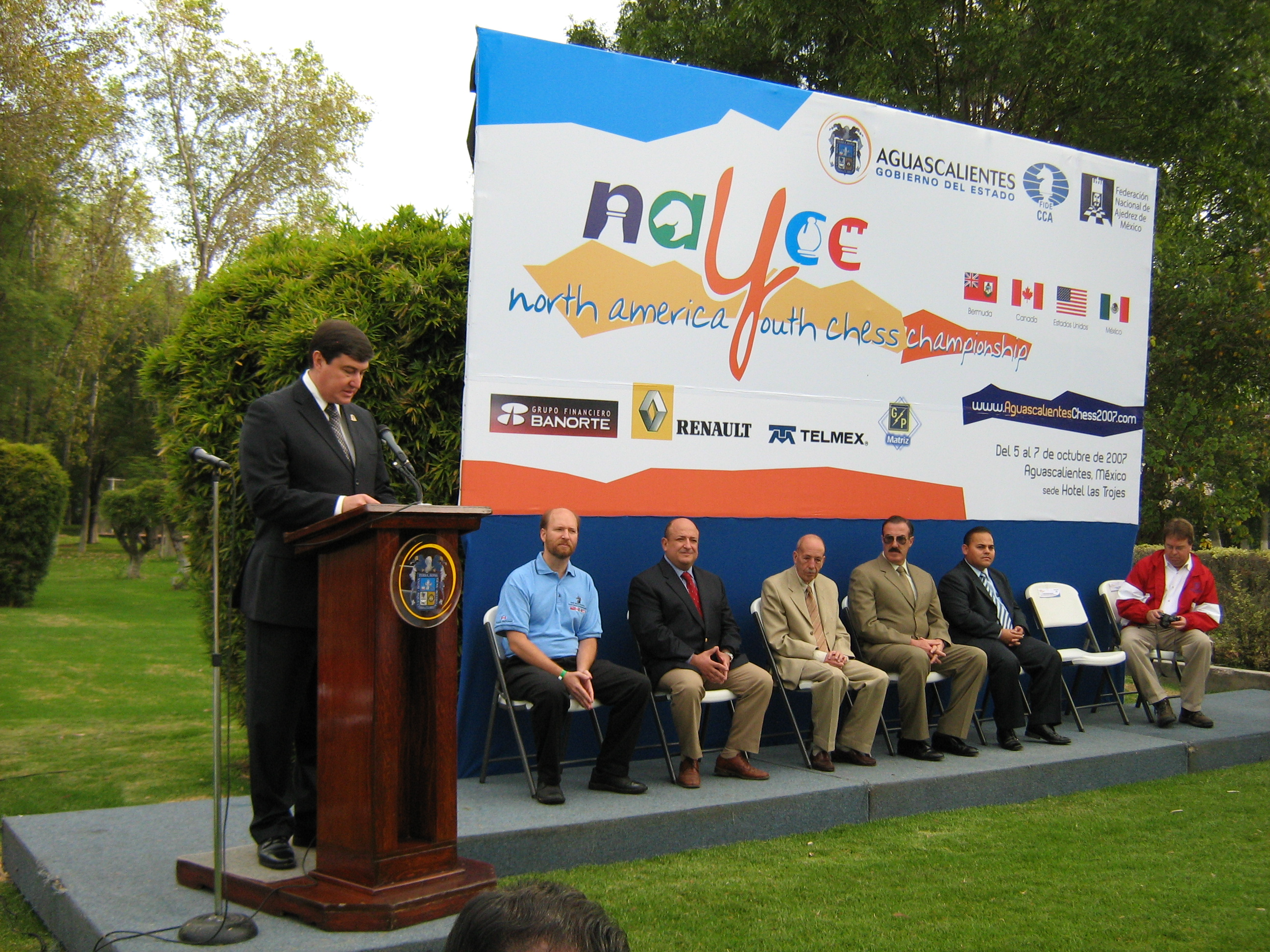
Florentino Reyes Berlie at the North American Youth Chess Championship, 2007

The North American Youth Chess Championship (NAYCC) is premier youth chess tournaments for participants under 18 in the Americas. The tournament held annually under the auspices of the Confederation of Chess for the Americas (CCA) and FIDE and first held in 2004 in Boca Raton, Florida. This event is open to players from Canada, Mexico, and the United States. The tournament has 6 age brackets, in two-year increments, from U8 (under 8) to U18. For each age bracket, there is an open championship and a separate championship for girls. Since at least 2015, there is also a blitz tournament. Winners of each category are awarded the title of North American Youth Champion, and top finishers earn direct FIDE titles such as Candidate Master (CM), FIDE Master (FM), International Master (IM), Woman Candidate Master (WCM), Woman FIDE Master (WFM), and Woman International Master (WIM), depending on section and performance.

The North American Youth Chess Championship, the Pan-American Youth Chess Championship, and the FIDE World Cadet and World Youth Chess Championships are connected through a hierarchical structure of youth chess competitions in the Americas. The NAYCC serves as a regional championship for North America and is organized under the framework of FIDE America. According to federation selection policies and tournament regulations, gold medalists at the North American Youth Chess Championship may be granted personal rights or nomination privileges to participate in the subsequent Pan-American Youth Chess Championship, subject to age eligibility and national federation approval.. The Pan-American Youth Chess Championship functions as the continental youth championship for players from North, Central, and South America and the Caribbean. Under FIDE regulations, continental youth champions are entitled to personal rights to participate in the corresponding World Cadet Chess Championship (Under-8 to Under-12) or World Youth Chess Championship (Under-14 to Under-18).

The 2020 North American Youth Championships had been postponed to 2021. In 2021, it was held in Chicago, Illinois. The U18 champions in NAYCC 2021 are Dimitar Mardov (Open), Alice Lee (Girls), and Nico Chasin (Blitz).

The 2026 North American Youth Championships were held in Mexico City

== Open championship winners (Gold medalists/champions) ==
Year	Location	U8	U10	U12	U14	U16	U18
2004	(United States) Boca Raton						
2005							
2006							
2007	(Mexico) Aguascalientes						
2008							
2009	(Mexico) Mazatlán						
2010	(Canada) Montreal						
2011	(United States) Tarrytown						
2012	Mexico City						
2013	(Canada) Toronto						
2014	(United States) Tarrytown	(United States) Arthur Guo	(United States) Maximillian Lu	(United States) David Brodsky	(United States) Jason Shi	(United States) Kesav Viswanadha	(United States) Alexander Katz
2015	(Mexico) Toluca	(United States) Aghilan Nachiappan	(United States) Justin Wang	(Canada) Shawn Rodrigue-Lemieux	(Mexico) Edgar Froylan Luna Javier	(Mexico) Carlos Sandoval Mercado	(Mexico) Jesus Aldair Flores Guerrero
2016	(Canada) Windsor	(Canada) Kevin Zhong	(United States) Rohun Trakru	(Canada) Nicholas Vettese	(United States) Aaron Shlionsky	(United States) Zhaozhi Li	(Canada) Michael Song
2017	(United States) Morristown	(United States) Kevin Duong	(United States) Liran Zhou	(United States) Maximillian Lu	(Canada) Qiuyu Huang	(United States) Christopher Yoo	(United States) Bryce Tiglon
2018	(Mexico) Baja California	(United States) Rohan Rajaram	(United States) Bryan Xie	(United States) Adrian Kondakov	(Mexico) Cristian Gael Bojorquez Gallardo	(Canada) Shawn Rodrigue-Lemieux	(United States) Ladia Jirasek
2019	(Canada) Kingston	(Canada) Matthew George Ivanescu	(Canada) Leo Lin	(United States) Jason Liang	(United States) Liam Putnam	(Canada) Rohan Shyam Talukdar	(United States) Alexander Costello
2020	Not organized						
2021	(United States) Chicago	(United States) Luke Hong	(United States) Marcel Podraza	(United States) Tanitoluwa Adewumi	(United States) Arthur Xu	(United States) Erick Zhao	(United States) Dimitar Mardov
2022	(Canada) Calgary	(United States) Joshua Xia	(United States) Yusuf Mansurov	(United States) Vedant Ameya Talwalkar	(Canada) Kevin Zhong	(United States) Tejas Rama	(Canada) Nicholas Vettese
2023	Mexico City	(United States) Aayansh R Guntaka	(Mexico) Luis Fernando Agama Hernandez	(Mexico) Matias Martinez Flores	(United States) Julian Colville	(Mexico) Carlos Francisco Varela Velazquez	(Canada) Johnathan Han
2024	(United States) Dulles	(United States) Grayson Xiang	(United States) Steven Liu	(United States) Ted Wang	(United States) Narayan Venkatesh	(United States) Ronen Wilson	(Canada) Aaron Reeve Mendes
2025	(Canada) Kingston	(Canada) Karson Lu	(United States) Stella Xin	(United States) Alex Haoning Chu	(Canada) Calix Marchand	(United States) Julian Colville	(Canada) Emanuel Kot
2026	Mexico City	(United States) Ruben Yanmi Quintans	(United States) Brian Ye	(United States) Liam Liu	(Mexico) Fernando Cortes Medina	(Mexico) Levi Kalani Fogo Esquivel	(United States) Narayan Venkatesh

== Girls championship winners (Gold medalists/champions) ==
Year	Location	U8	U10	U12	U14	U16	U18
2004	(United States) Boca Raton						
2005							
2006							
2007	(Mexico) Aguascalientes						
2008							
2009	(Mexico) Mazatlán						
2010	(Canada) Montreal						
2011	(United States) Tarrytown						
2012	Mexico City						
2013	(Canada) Toronto			(United States) Jennifer Yu			
2014	(United States) Tarrytown		(Canada) Kylie Tan	(United States) Martha Samadashvili		(United States) Annie Zhao	(United States) Annie Wang
2015	(Mexico) Toluca	(United States) Amelie Phung	(Mexico) Lhia Itzayana Castellanos Hernandez	(Canada) Cindy Qiao	(United States) Joanna Liu	(United States) Kaitlyn Yang	(Canada) Qiyu Zhou
2016	(Canada) Windsor	(United States) Sophie Velea	(United States) Atmika Gorti	(United States) Claire Cao	(United States) Sasha Konovalenko	(Canada) Svitlana Demchenko	(Canada) Maili-Jade Ouellet
2017	(United States) Morristown	(United States) Iris Mou	(United States) Stephanie Velea	(United States) Annapoorni Meiyappan	(United States) Ellen Wang	(United States) Queena Deng	(United States) Evelyn Zhu
2018	(Mexico) Baja California	(United States) Jocelyn Chen	(United States) Sara Gupta	(United States) Melina Li	(United States) Aasa Dommalapati	(United States) Minda Chen	(United States) Joanna Liu
2019	(Canada) Kingston	(United States) Whitney Tse	(Canada) Greta Qu	(United States) Yesun Lee	(United States) Rianne Ke	(United States) Sanjana Vittal	(Canada) Svitlana Demchenko
2020	Not organized						
2021	(United States) Chicago	(United States) Irene Jiao Fei	(United States) Olivia Laido	(United States) Omya Vidyarthi	(United States) Zoey Tang	(United States) Kelsey Liu	(United States) Alice Lee
2022	(Canada) Calgary	(United States) Aimee Yang	(Mexico) Mia Fernanda Guzman Garcia	(United States) Sahana Aravindakshan	(United States) Ananya Ananth	(United States) Tianna Wang	(United States) Zoey Tang
2023	Mexico City	(United States) Elizabeth Xia	(United States) Sophie Li	(United States) Laura Qiu	(United States) Chloe Wang	(Mexico) Elizabeth Schahrazad Diaz Bartolo	(United States) Aradh Kaur
2024	(United States) Dulles	(United States) Sarah Nguyen	(United States) Ella Xinyue Zhang	(United States) Aimee Yang	(Canada) Laksshana Deepak	(United States) Erin Bian	(United States) Jasmine Zhixin Su
2025	(Canada) Kingston	(United States) Emily Jiaying Tang	(United States) Abigail Zhou	(Canada) Michelle Zhang	(United States) Lilianna Gao	(Canada) Hanxi Jiang	(United States) Jasmine Zhixin Su
2026	Mexico City	(United States) Amaira Bajaj	(United States) Angela Zixi Wang	(United States) Wan Qin Li	(United States) Pear Xu	(Canada) Anais Chloe Fiset	(Mexico) Mia Fernanda Guzman Garcia

== See also ==
- African Junior Chess Championship
- Asian Junior Chess Championship
- European Junior Chess Championship
- European Youth Chess Championship
- Pan American Junior Chess Championship
- World Youth Chess Championship
