= Tanitoluwa =

Nigerian given name

- Gender: Male
- Language: Yoruba

Origin
- Origin: Nigerian
- Meaning: "Who is like the Lord" or "Who is as mighty as God"
- Region of origin: South-west Nigeria

Other names
- Variant forms: Tańtọ́lọ́run; Tańtọ́lọ́un

TantoluwaTanitoluwa or Tantoluwa is a masculine Nigerian given name of Yoruba origin. It combines the Yoruba words "ta" (who), "ni" (is), "tó" (match, big as, equal to), and "olúwa" (Lord, God), translating to "Who is like the Lord" or "who is as mighty as God" Morphologically, it is written as ta-ni-tó-olúwa.

== Notable people with the given name ==
- Tanitoluwa Adewumi (born 2010) Nigerian-American chess player.
- Tani Oluwaseyi –born as Tanitoluwa Oluwaseyi (born 2000) Canadian soccer player.
