= Aaron Reeve Mendes =

Indian-Canadian chess player (born 2012)

Personal information
- Born: August 16, 2012 (age 14) Mangalore, India

Chess career
- Country: India (until 2020); Canada (since 2020)
- Title: International Master (2025)
- Peak rating: 2359 (December 2024)

Aaron Reeve Mendes is an Indian-Canadian chess player.

== Chess career ==
Aaron Reeve Mendes (born August 16, 2012) developed an interest in chess at the age of five.

In 2019, he achieved top finishes at multiple national and continental championships. At the Ontario Youth Chess Championship (OYCC), he landed the 1st runner-up in the under-8 age category. Later that year, he won a 3rd tie position in the National level under-8 Canadian Youth Chess Championship (CYCC) at the age of 7. and represented the country at the North American Youth Chess Championship (NAYCC), where he secured 2nd place in the under-8 open category. This challenging event brought together young chess prodigies from Canada, the United States, Mexico, and the Bahamas.

In 2020, Aaron tied for the first position and bagged second in the tie breaker, scoring 6 on 7 at the ‘American Continental - Fide Online World U10 Rapid Championship.

His family immigrated to Mississauga, Ontario, Canada in 2021. He is coached by grandmasters Stany G.A., Swayams Mishra, and Arjun Kalyan.

Aaron won a gold medal in the Under 11 Open category at the FIDE World School Chess Championship 2022, competing against 489 talented players from 37 countries.

In July 2022, he became the youngest Canadian player to defeat a grandmaster after winning a game against Razvan Preotu in the Canadian Open chess tournament at the age of 9 years and 325 days.

That same year, Aaron was ranked as the highest FIDE-rated U10 player in the world with a 2095 standard rating in August 2022, and he is the only player from Canada to achieve this feat.

In September 2023, Aaron won the 4th Annual ChessKid YSCC. Aaron's journey to the YSCC title included several victories, including his semifinals match against FM Oro Faustino. On August 1, 2023, Aaron and Faustino, a 9-year-old chess prodigy with a 2300 chess rating, competed in a match that Aaron won with a score of 8:6.

In January 2024, he tied for second place with Mandar Pradip Lad and Augustin A in the 6th Kudremukh Trophy Rapid Rating Open. He was ranked second according to tiebreaks.

In the same month, Chessable, along with FIDE, organized chess training for 450 participants under the age of 16 years around the world. From each chess-playing country, 2 candidates were selected to participate in this camp. Among the selected few was Aaron, earning his place to sharpen his skills alongside other promising talents from across the globe.

In March 2024, after undergoing rigorous online training by FIDE, 12 exceptional chess players were selected among the 450 participants. Aaron was one of the top talents selected, and he earned a spot in a prestigious 5-day on-site FIDE Chessable Academy Camp in Menorca, Spain, which is led by legendary Grand Masters GM Judit Polgar and GM Artur Jussupow.

In April 2024, Aaron clinched the first position in the III Open Internacional Chess Menorca Blitz, held in Spain on April 4, 2024. Amongst over 160 participants from across the globe, Aaron earned a remarkable performance rating of 2621. Aaron's Blitz live rating stands at an impressive 2385, ranking him at the number one position in the Blitz category for Under 12.

In December 2024, he became the youngest Canadian player to achieve the International Master title after winning the gold medal in the Under-18 category at the North American Youth Chess Championship. With this, he became the second-youngest International Master globally and the No. 2-ranked player under the age of 12.

In May 2025, IM Aaron Mendes won the 2025 Under-13 ChessKid Youth Championship after he defeated FM Megan Paragua in the final with a score of 5–3 in the best-of-six blitz series. The championship, which took place on May 3–4, 2025, featured a fast-paced 3+1 time control and a $5,000 prize fund.

In May 2025, while in Grade 7, he won the Ontario High School Chess Championship, defeating older competitors from across the province.

In July 2025, at just 12 years old, he became Canada's youngest Under-18 Youth Champion, earning the honour of representing the country at the FIDE World Youth Chess Championships in Albania in October 2025.

In May 2026, Aaron achieved a peak online blitz rating of 3108 on Chess.com and was ranked among the top 100 players worldwide across all age categories. As of May 8, 2026, his blitz rating stands at 3101, making him the only Canadian player ranked in the top 100 worldwide in Chess.com blitz ratings.
