= Christopher Noe =

German chess grandmaster (born 1996)

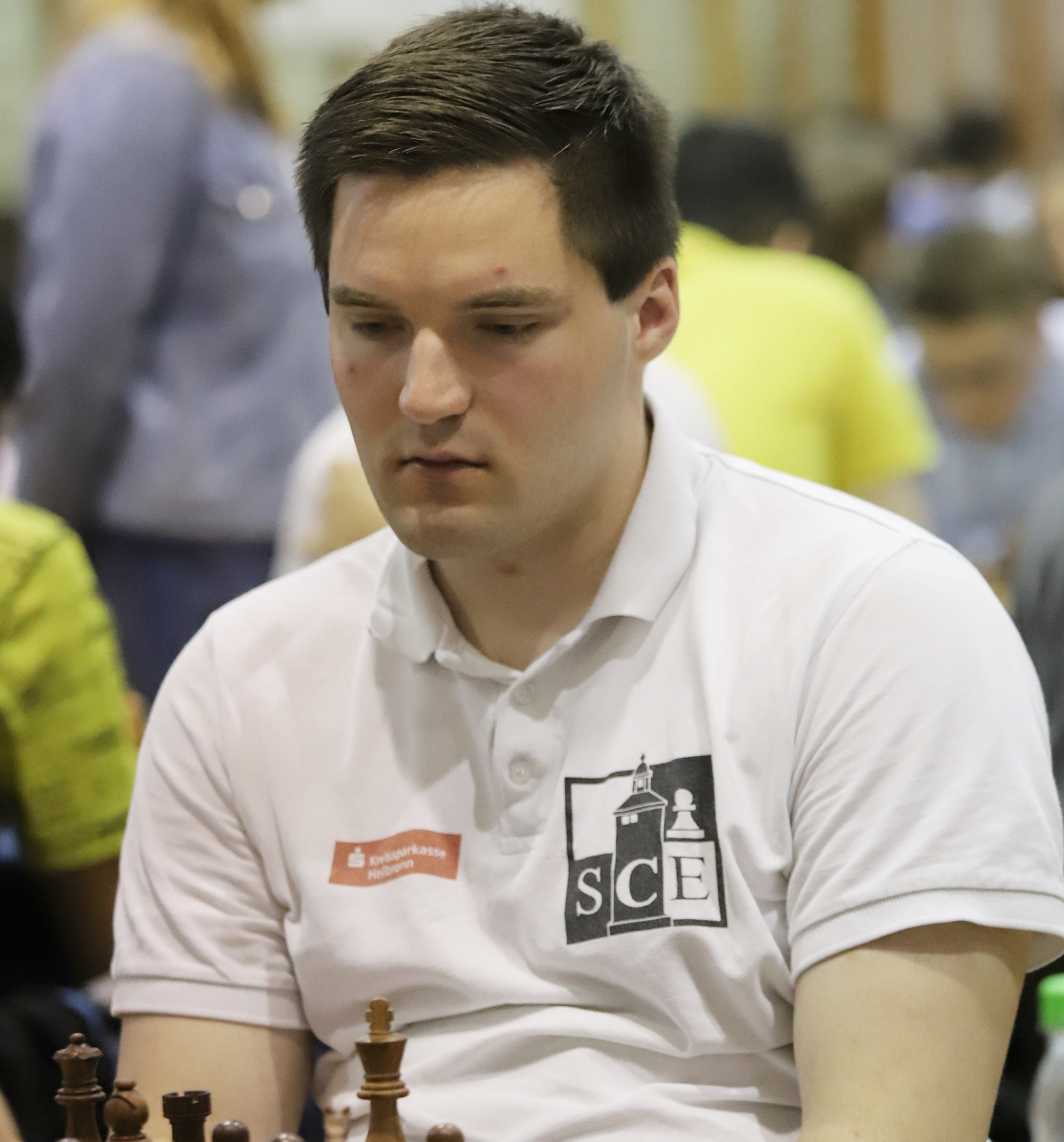
- Noe in 2019

Personal information
- Born: April 27, 1996 (age 30) Sinsheim, Germany

Chess career
- Country: Germany
- Title: Grandmaster (2025)
- FIDE rating: 2501 (July 2026)
- Peak rating: 2537 (April 2019)

Christopher Noe is a German chess grandmaster.

== Chess career ==
In July 2024, he finished in 10th place in the Czech Open.

In August 2024, he played in the Puzzle Battle World Championship, where he was eliminated in the first round after scoring worse than Ray Robson, Daniel Naroditsky, and Tanitoluwa Adewumi.

He was awarded the Grandmaster title in 2025, after achieving his norms at the:

- Czech Open in July 2017
- Grenke Chess Open in April 2018
- European Chess Club Cup in October 2022
