= Liam Putnam =

American chess grandmaster (born 2008)

Personal information
- Born: 2008 (age 17–18) Rocky Point, New York

Chess career
- Country: United States
- Title: Grandmaster (2026)
- FIDE rating: 2499 (September 2026)
- Peak rating: 2515 (July 2026)

Liam Henry Putnam is an American chess grandmaster.

== Chess career ==
Putnam began playing chess at the age of 7, tying for 2nd place in the 2016 elementary school nationals after 8 months of playing. In 2019, as an 11 year old he won the U14 section of the North American Youth Chess Championship.

In January 2026, he won the Ciudad de Sevilla Open with an undefeated score of 8/9, edging out grandmaster Praveen Balakrishnan on tiebreak scores, winning the tournament.

In June 2026, he tied for first place with grandmasters Christopher Yoo and Arman Mikaelyan in the National Open at the Las Vegas International Chess Festival with an undefeated score of 7/9. He won the championship on tiebreaks.

He achieved the Grandmaster title in 2026, earning his norms at the:

- NYC Chess Norms Memorial Day Marshall Invitational GM A in May 2025
- SixDays Budapest GM-B in November 2025
- Saint Louis Masters in February 2026
