= Maximillian Lu =

American chess player (born 2005)

Personal information
- Born: September 30, 2005 (age 21) Greenwich, Connecticut

Chess career
- Country: United States
- Title: International Master (2022)
- FIDE rating: 2461 (November 2026)
- Peak rating: 2466 (June 2026)

Maximillian Lu is an American chess player. Lu was the former youngest United States Chess Federation member to attain a master rating. At approximately nine-years and eleven-months of age Maximillian beat the previous record by twelve days. About a year later, this record was broken by Christopher Yoo. Lu is a 7-time National Scholastic Champion, 3-time North American Youth Champion, and 3-time Pan-American Youth Champion.

== List of tournament wins ==
2013 FIDE North American Youth Chess Championship, Toronto, Canada, under-8, 1st place – received Fide Candidate Master title.

2013 FIDE World Youth Chess Championship, Al-Ain, UAE, 4th place, under-8, top U.S. finisher.

2014 FIDE North American Youth Chess Championship, Tarrytown, New York, under-10, 1st place.

2015 USCF K-3 National Blitz Champion, 1st place.

2015 US Chess Federation Grade Nationals, 4th Grade National Champion, 1st place.

2017 FIDE North American Youth Chess Championship, under-12, 1st place.

2018, 2019, 2021 FIDE Pan-American Youth Chess Championship, under-16, 1st place.

2023 US Chess Federation Grade Nationals, 12th Grade National Co-Champion.

Achievements
Preceded by Awonder Liang	Youngest ever United States chessmaster 2015–2016	Succeeded by Christopher Yoo
