= Dimitar Mardov =

American chess player (born 2008)

Personal information
- Born: July 27, 2008 (age 18) Chicago, Illinois

Chess career
- Country: United States
- Title: International Master (2021)
- FIDE rating: 2490 (October 2026)
- Peak rating: 2516 (February 2025)

Dimitar Mardov is an American chess player.

== Chess career ==
In June 2015, he won the U6 section of the ChessKid Online National Invitational Championship.

In December 2020, he won the U12 section of the World Youth Chess Championship ahead of Ihor Samunenkov and Ngo Bach.

In August 2021, he won the U18 section of the North American Youth Chess Championship, a full point ahead of runners-up Samrug Narayanan, Justin Chen, and Anthony Atanasov.

In July 2024, he won the Paracin International Chess Festival Open A, finishing a full point ahead of the field, which included grandmasters Alexandr Fier, Eltaj Safarli, Gergely Antal, and Krishnan Sasikiran.

In January 2025, he won the BlitzFuel Invitational GM-A tournament in New York by a full point, also earning his second GM norm.
