= Nico Chasin =

American chess grandmaster (born 2006)

Personal information
- Born: September 19, 2006 (age 19) New York City, U.S.

Chess career
- Country: United States
- Title: Grandmaster (2026)
- FIDE rating: 2479 (July 2026)
- Peak rating: 2524 (January 2026)

Nico Werner Chasin (born September 19, 2006) is an American chess grandmaster.

== Chess career ==
In July 2017, he won the under-12 section of the Panamerican Chess Festival, defeating Sion Radamantys Galaviz Medina on tiebreak scores.

In January 2019, he won the Junior High section of the New York Scholastic Team and Individual Chess Championships.

In August 2021, he won the U18 blitz section of the North American Youth Chess Championship with a perfect score of 10/10.

In April 2022, he tied for first place with Arthur Guo, Vishnu Vanapalli, Gus Huston, Anthony He, Bijan Tahmassebi, and Advaith Karthik in the U.S. High School Championship, but was ranked in 6th place after tiebreak scores.

In July 2022, he won the U.S. Cadet Championship, 1.5 points ahead of runner-up Arthur Guo.

In November 2024, he was the top American player in the World Youth Chess Championship, tying for 5th place with a score of 7.5/11.

On 3 December 2025, he earned his final grandmaster norm at the XTX Markets London Chess Classic Open with a performance rating of 2608, becoming GM-elect as he had already reached the 2500 rating requirement.

== Personal life ==
He attended the Columbia Grammar & Preparatory School and is attending the University of Chicago.
