= Nicolas Checa =

American chess grandmaster (born 2001)

Personal information
- Born: December 19, 2001 (age 24) Dobbs Ferry, New York, U.S.

Chess career
- Country: United States
- Title: Grandmaster (2019)
- FIDE rating: 2507 (July 2026)
- Peak rating: 2574 (May 2021)

Nicolas de T. Checa (born December 19, 2001) is an American chess player who holds the FIDE title of Grandmaster (GM). He is from Dobbs Ferry, New York and lives in New York City. A chess prodigy, he began playing competitive chess at age 7. He is the recipient of the 2020 and 2021 Samford Fellowships, an award granted to the top American chess players under 25. He is the 2021, 2022, (second on tiebreaks in 2023), and 2024 Connecticut State Champion and a graduate of Yale University. In March 2025, he led Yale University to win the Inter-Ivy League Chess Championship, which was held at Columbia University. Yale University profiled Grandmasters Checa and Guo in March 2025: Checkmates: Chess phenoms share a college and a mastery of the ‘royal game’. In May 2025, he was inducted into the Connecticut Chess Hall of Fame.

== Biography ==
Checa is the youngest Annual New York State Champion since the official championship started in 1878, a record that he achieved as an 11-year-old in 2013 and still holds. Although he finished tied for second in the 2013 tournament behind Alexander Ivanov, only New York residents are eligible for the title of state champion.

Checa fulfilled all the FIDE Grandmaster title requirements in November 2018 at age 16. His Grandmaster Title was formally approved by FIDE in March 2019 in Astana, Kazakhstan. He became a FIDE Master in 2015 and an International Master in 2016.

In 2017 he placed first (tiebreaks) in the VI SuperNationals High School (K-12) Blitz Championship held in Nashville, becoming the national scholastic blitz champion as a freshman.

In 2017, he also became the Marshall Chess Club champion after beating Grandmaster Sergei Azarov in a blitz match playoff.

In 2017 he was part of the US National Team in the Match of the Millennials when the top 5 junior players in the US faced the top 5 juniors from the rest of the world.

In the summer of 2018, Checa was a United States Senate Page, working as a Senate floor assistant and residing in Webster Hall, the official residence for US Senate Pages.

In November 2018, Checa earned his final GM norm by earning clear first place in the Charlotte Chess Center's Fall 2018 GM Norm Invitational held in Charlotte, North Carolina with an undefeated score of 6.5/9.

In July 2019 he tied for first (tiebreaks equal second) in the US Junior Invitational Championship with the only undefeated score of 7/9.

Checa also placed first in the 2019 National High School Championship (K-12) (first on tiebreaks), the highest national scholastic title in the US in classical chess time controls. As a high school junior, he placed first in the national championship held in Chicago by the US Chess Federation.

In 2019 he defeated Fabiano Caruana in the Professional Chess League Group Stage.

In 2020, Checa won the national Denker Tournament of High School Champions named after Arnold Denker.
