= Jason Liang =

American chess grandmaster (born 2007)

- Liang in 2022

Personal information
- Born: February 7, 2007 (age 19) Potsdam, New York

Chess career
- Country: United States
- Title: Grandmaster (2026)
- FIDE rating: 2448 (November 2026)
- Peak rating: 2530 (April 2023)

Jason Liang is an American chess grandmaster. He has held the titles of National Master since 2018, FIDE Master since 2019, International Master since 2021, and Grandmaster since 2026. In 2022, he received the Arthur Award for Chess Excellence from the Eade Foundation. In May 2023, he was selected to receive a Samford Fellowship by the U.S. Chess Trust. He was ranked World #33 junior chess player by FIDE on April 1, 2023.

== Chess career ==
=== Early stage ===
Liang played in his first chess tournament at age 9. He was introduced to tournament chess by NM Justin Burgess and Ali Thompson. In 2016, he was coached by NM Chris Peterson in Colorado. At age 10, Liang became a K-5 Scholastic Champion of the State of Virginia. While in Virginia Liang was a member of the DMV Chess Club and the Arlington Chess Club and became a National Master at age 11. Between 2017 and 2018, he was coached by GM Rashad Babaev and GM Akshayraj Kore.

=== Highlights ===
Liang was the gold medalist of the U12 section at the North American Youth Chess Championship held in August 2019, Kingston Canada. He was also a co-champion of the Barber National Tournament of Middle School State Champions held in August 2020. Liang placed clear 1st of the U14 Section at the American Continental Selection of the 2020 FIDE World Youth Championship. Liang has been part of the United States Chess Federation All-America Chess Team since 2020. He also became the 143rd and 144th New York State Chess Champions after competing in 2021 and 2022 at Albany, New York. In October 2022, he became a champion of the Canadian International Open held at Contrecoeur near Montreal. Liang scored 7/9 at the 2022 North American Open and tied for second by beating the 2022 World Open Champion GM Antipov in the final round. In April 2023 it was announced that he won the US Chess 2022 Grand Prix with 222.68 points.

=== Road to IM ===
Liang crossed FIDE 2400 at the 49th World Open held in Philadelphia on July 3, 2021, and thus qualified for the IM title. He earned his first IM norm after scoring 7/9 at the Montreal Winter Chess Classic in March 2020. His second IM norm was achieved at the Charlotte Chess Center Summer IM Norm Invitational held in August 2020. In December 2020, Liang secured his third IM norm by earning the silver medal at the North American Junior Chess Championship held in Charlotte, North Carolina. In August 2021, Liang tied for first place in the Charlotte Chess Center's Summer GM Norm Invitational with a score of 5.5/9, tying with GM Tanguy Ringoir and IM Aleksandr Ostrovskiy and earning a fourth IM norm.

=== Road to GM ===
Liang achieved his first GM norm in the New York City Grandmaster Norm Invitational with a score of 6.5/9, tying for first place with GM Vladimir Belous in April 2022. In June 2022, he was clear 1st by scoring 6.5/9 in the Eastern Ontario Chess Championship GM Norm Section held in Ottawa. In August 2022, Liang became a co-champion of Washington International after drawing GM elect Viktor Gažík and GM John M. Burke. In November 2022, Liang earned his second GM norm by scoring 7/9 at the Maplewood Invitational held in Waterloo, Ontario and simultaneously crossed 2500 in his FIDE rating. He earned his 3rd norm in June 2025 at the Under-20 Pan American Championship in Asuncion, Paraguay. In May 2026 he earned a norm at the Chicago Open. He has fulfilled all the requirements for the GM title and awaits confirmation from FIDE.

== Personal life ==
Liang graduated from the Belmont Station Elementary School in Ashburn VA receiving an Outstanding Academic Achievement Award from President Trump. He attended Trailside Middle School in Ashburn, Virginia, and AA Kingston Middle School and Potsdam High School in Potsdam NY. He is studying civil engineering at Georgia Tech.

Liang's father, Chunlei Charles Liang, is a professor of mechanical and aerospace engineering at Clarkson University.
