= David Brodsky =

American chess grandmaster (born 2002)

Personal information
- Born: August 19, 2002 (age 23) Mount Kisco, New York, U.S.

Chess career
- Country: United States
- Title: Grandmaster (2022)
- FIDE rating: 2518 (July 2026)
- Peak rating: 2539 (October 2024)

David Brodsky is an American chess grandmaster.

== Chess career ==
Brodsky began playing chess at the age of six. He received training from Farrukh Amonatov.

In April 2017, Brodsky earned his final International Master norm.

In November 2019, Brodsky tied with grandmaster Andrew Tang for first place at the National Chess Congress in Philadelphia. Brodsky achieved the victory by defeating IM Jason Liang in the final round.

In August 2019, Brodsky earned his final Grandmaster norm at the 2019 U.S. Masters, though his rating at the time was insufficient to immediately be awarded the title.

In June 2022, Brodsky tied for first place with grandmasters Alexander Shabalov, Elshan Moradiabadi and Daniel Naroditsky at the 2022 Carolinas Classic. In July 2022, he defeated grandmaster Awonder Liang and eventual winner Christopher Yoo in the seventh round of the U.S. Junior Chess Championship, but ultimately finished fifth out of 10 players with a score of 4.5/9. In September 2022, his rating officially surpassed 2500, thus earning him the Grandmaster title.

== Personal life ==
Brodsky attended high school in Westchester County, New York. After graduation, he began studying computer science and mathematics at the University of Texas at Dallas, where he was also a member of the chess team. The team competed at the President's Cup tournament at Texas Tech University in April 2022, finishing 4th overall.
