= Stany G.A. =

Indian chess grandmaster (born 1993)

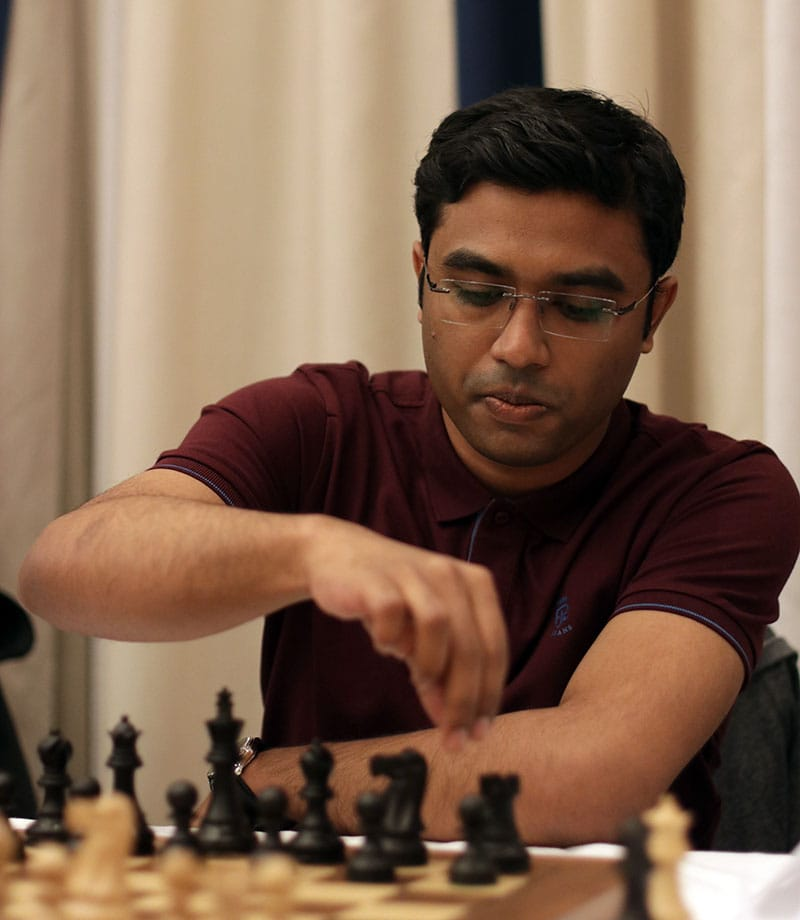
- Stany G.A. in 2019

Personal information
- Born: 22 January 1993 (age 33) Bhadravati, Karnataka, India

Chess career
- Country: India
- Title: Grandmaster (2018)
- FIDE rating: 2429 (July 2026)
- Peak rating: 2527 (May 2019)

Stany George Anthony (born 22 January 1993) is an Indian chess player and a chess grandmaster. In 2012, he became Karnataka's youngest international master at the time after completing his final norm in Rethymno International Open, Greece. In December 2018 he completed his final grand master norm in National Senior Chess Championship, Jammu and became India's fifty-eighth and Karnataka's second grandmaster. He was given the Ekalavya Award by the Govt of Karnataka in 2012. Stany is a B.Com. graduate and has done masters in business administration.

== Early life ==
Stany was born on 22 January 1993 in Bhadravati, India. He was the second son of Late Anthony Gnana Prakash and Lizy Anthony. Stany started chess at the age of 8. He learnt the rules of game by observing his uncle who was teaching the basic rules of the game to his elder brother Tony. Seeing his interest towards chess, his parents took him to Sri Krishna Udupa of Nalanda Chess Academy, Shivamogga, who became his first coach.

== International Master (2002-2012) ==
With the regular training under Udupa for first few years Stany kept winning various age category tournaments in Karnataka. In 2009 at the age of 16, He won Karnataka State Senior Chess Championship and created a record of youngest state senior champion that year. His success in National level started when he won National U-17 Championship in Jammu in 2011 and got qualified for Asian and World Youth Championship 2011. He won silver medal in the Asian U-18 championship in the Philippines and was tied for second along with Fedoseev Vladimir and Debashish Das in World U-18 Championship but finished fourth due to tiebreak. Stany made his maiden international master norm in National Premier Chess Championship in 2010, the second one in Odisha GM International Open 2011 and the final norm in Rethymno International Open Greece. He was awarded international master title by FIDE in 2012. He again created a record of becoming Karnataka's youngest IM at that time at the age of 19. He had short coaching sessions with IM Shivanada, GM R. B. Ramesh, GM Tejas Bakre around this period.

== Grandmaster (since 2012) ==
After becoming International Master, Stany started to play in many European tournaments. In 2015 he started to work with IM V Saravanan of Chennai which turned out to be a great success. Stany had back to back successes in French International Opens around 2015–2016. He won the 1st Liffre Open in France 2015. He was the runner-up in the first edition of the famous IIFL International Open Tournament, Mumbai 2016. He got his first Grandmaster Norm in LUC Open, France where he finished 2nd ahead of many GMs. Right after that he won Malakoff Open 2016 in Paris ahead of top seed the legendary Evgeny Sveshnikov. The same year he went on to win Sautron Open, France 2016. The year 2017 turned out to be very successful for Stany as he started to perform consistently and finished in top 3 in many European Grandmaster tournaments. In January Stany crossed 2500 Fide Elo when he finished 3rd in Seville Open, Spain. He played his first tournament in Italy, Forni Di Sopra Open 2017 and surprised everyone after defeating the tournament leader GM Franco Matamoros of Ecuador in the last round with Black and clinched the Title. He finished 2nd in Gros Open Spain 2017. He played in Stavanger open 2017 Norway and Finished 3rd. He again Successfully defended his title in Sautron International Open 2017 and won the tournament with a round to spare shortly after his return to India from his successful trip Stany had to go through personal tragedy as his father died due to cardiac arrest, Stany later stated that "His only regret was the fact that he could not become a GM when his father was alive". Stany started 2018 by finishing 2nd runner up in the Prestigious Hastings Masters in UK. But then had a string of bad tournaments, He missed GM norms by a whisker in Czech Open and Arad Open, Romania. He finished third in Gujarat International Open where Stany made headlines by scoring 7/7 in which he defeated the top seed of the tournament GM Kravtsiv Martyn of Ukraine in round 7. He thereby got his 2nd Grandmaster Norm with two rounds to spare. He eventually finished third in the tournament. Stany continued his fine form in the National Senior Chess Championship in Jammu in December 2018, and scored his third and Final GrandMaster Norm on Round 9 by making a draw against GM Aravind Chithambaram of Tamil Nadu and thereby completed his Grandmaster title requirements. By doing so he became India's 58th GM and Karnataka's second GM.
