= Anna M. Sargsyan =

Armenian-American chess player (born 2001)

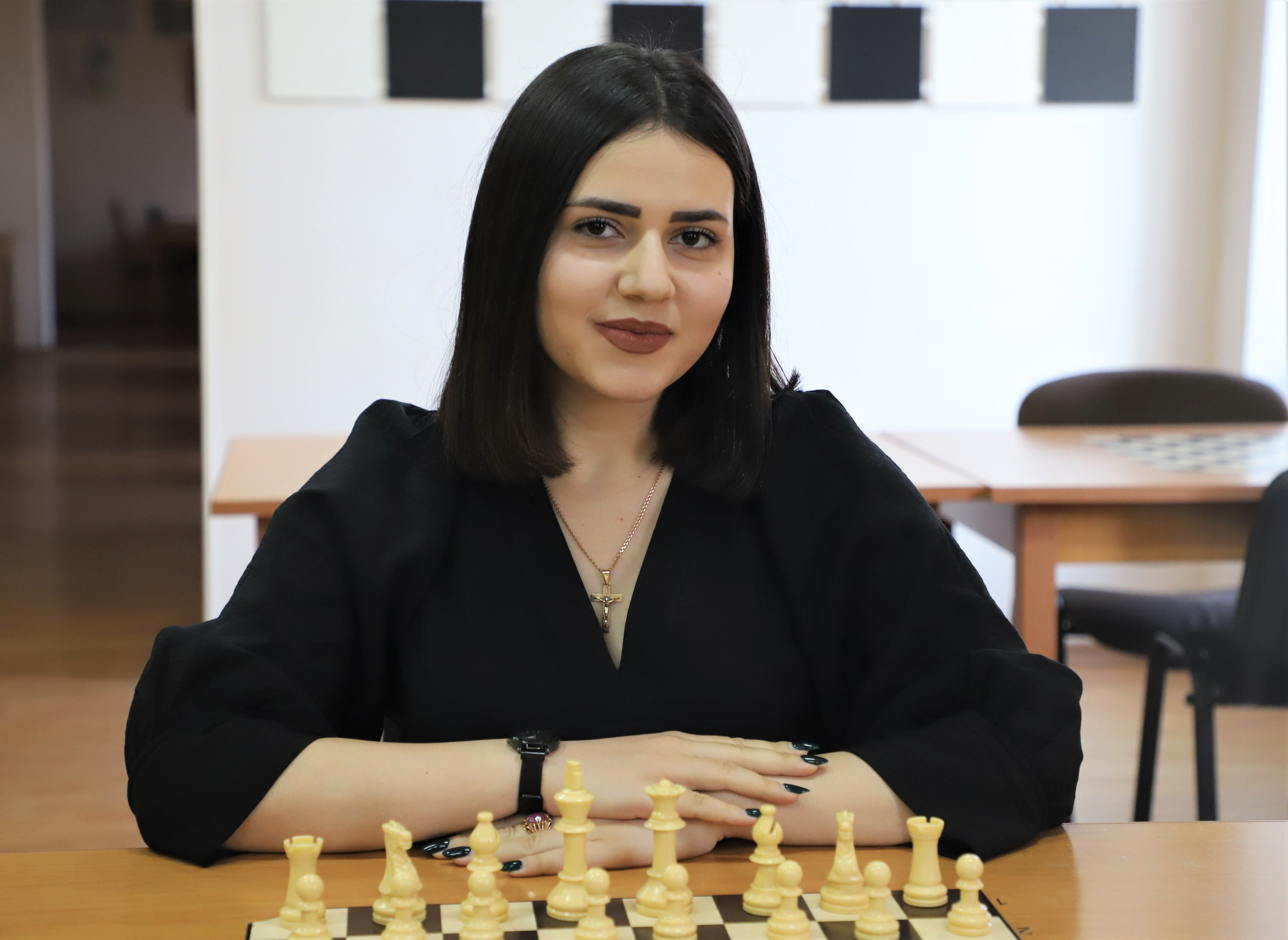

Personal information
- Born: 10 April 2001 (age 25) Artashat, Armenia

Chess career
- Country: Armenia (until 2025); United States (since 2025)
- Title: International Master (2021); Woman Grandmaster (2020)
- FIDE rating: 2358 (January 2025)
- Peak rating: 2405 (March 2020)

Anna M. Sargsyan (Armenian: Աննա Մ. Սարգսյան; born 10 April 2001) is an Armenian-American chess player. She received the FIDE title of International Master (IM) in 2021 and is a European Women's Team Chess Championship individual gold medal winner (2019).

== Biography ==
Sargsyan participated in European Youth Chess Championships and World Youth Chess Championships and reached best result in 2017, when she ranked 4th in European Youth Chess Championship in girl's U16 age group. Since 2016 she participated in Armenian Women's Chess Championship finals where her best result is 4th place in 2016.

She played for Armenia in the Women's Chess Olympiad:

- In 2018, at third board in the 43rd Chess Olympiad (women) in Batumi (+5, =4, -2);
- In 2022, at third board in the 44th Chess Olympiad (women) in Chennai (+6, =1, -2);
- In 2024, at fourth board in the 45th Chess Olympiad (women) in Budapest (+7, =2, -1) and won individual bronze medal.

Sargsyan played for Armenia in the World Women's Team Chess Championship:

- In 2019, at third board in the 7th Women's World Team Chess Championship in Astana (+2, =3, -4).

She played for Armenia in the European Women's Team Chess Championship:

- In 2019, at reserve board in the 22nd European Team Chess Championship (women) in Batumi (+6, =2, -0) and won individual gold medal.

In 2019, Sargsyan was awarded the FIDE Woman International Master (WIM) title.

In 2021, she became the First Women's World University Online Blitz Champion and vice-champion of the First Women's World University Online Rapid Championship.
