= Akshayraj Kore =

Indian chess grandmaster (born 1988)

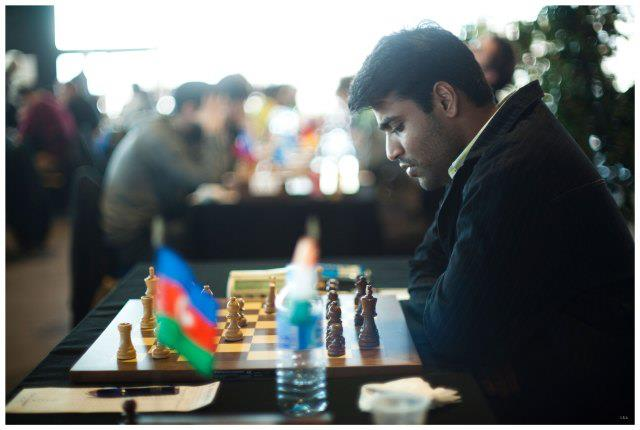
- Kore in 2013

Personal information
- Born: 1 September 1988 (age 37) Ahmednagar, India

Chess career
- Country: India
- Title: Grandmaster (2013)
- FIDE rating: 2482 (July 2026)
- Peak rating: 2512 (March 2013)

Akshayraj Kore (born 1 September 1988), is an Indian chess player and a Grandmaster. In 2006, he became Maharashtra's youngest International Master at the time after he won the Invitational IM Norm Round Robin Chess Tournament in Luhansk, Ukraine. In February 2013, he became India's 32nd Grandmaster.

== Early life ==
Kore was born on 1 September 1988 in Ahmednagar, India. Shortly thereafter his family moved to Sangli, Maharashtra, India. In 1996, his family moved to Pune. There he went to MAEER's MIT High School and the MAEER's MIT Junior College. He graduated in Bachelor of Engineering, Computer from Marathwada Mitramandal's College Of Engineering University of Pune.

== Career ==
=== Early career (1998–2006) ===
Kore was initially coached by Narhar Venkatesh, a well known chess coach, also known as Bhausaheb Padasalgikar. He had also previously coached Swati Ghate and Bhagyashree Sathe-Thipsay, well known Indian female chess players. He won a state silver medal in the under 12 age category in 1999. In 2000, he won the State Championship. He also represented India in the under 12 World Youth Chess Championship (boys), 2000. Although seeded 49th at the start of the championship he finished in the top 10.

Kore vs. Soshnikov, Luhansk 2006

Position: f8 black king, h8 black rook, a7 white queen, d7 black bishop, g7 white rook, h7 black pawn, e6 black pawn, a5 black pawn, e5 white pawn, f4 white pawn, g4 white king, h4 white pawn, c3 black pawn, a2 black pawn, c2 white pawn, g2 white pawn, d1 black rook

Kore's combination in the 5th round against Mikhail Soshnikov
Kore plays 36.Qc5+!
White mates in five moves.

In early 2001, Sekhar Chandra Sahu, IM, accepted the offer to coach him. That year Kore won the bronze medal in the U-16 Sub-Junior National Chess Championship. The next year Raj won the National U-14 Rapid Chess Championship. The same year, he also won the silver medal in U-16 Sub-Junior National Chess Championship. Later that year he increased his ELO rating to 2300+ by his performance in the National B Chess Championship, 2002.

He played fewer games due to examinations, but in 2003, he won the U-16 Commonwealth Chess Championship and was a member of the team which won the bronze medal at The Youth Chess Olympiad held at Denizli, Turkey. He played on the first board. The medal was the first one for the country in an Olympiad.

In 2004 he won his first International Master norm in Alushta 3 2004 Intl., Ukraine and also increased his rating to 2400+. In Piloo Mody International Open Chess Tournament, Lucknow, 2004 he beat GM Pavel Kotsur. In the 7th United Insurance & United Leasing Grand Masters's Chess Tournament, Dhaka, 2005, he beat Ukrainian GM Ruslan Pogorelov.

In 2006, he gained his second IM norm in Alushta Summer 2 Invitational IM Norm Round Robin Tournament at Alushta, Ukraine. He gained his third and final norm in a tournament in Luhansk, Ukraine by winning the Invitational IM Norm Round Robin Chess Tournament, scoring 12 points in 16 games. He received a special appreciation for his combination in the 5th round against Soshnikov Mikhail.

=== Post IM career ===
Kore played a blitz qualifier for National Rapid Knockout Chess Championship in July 2006 held at the Poona Club, Pune. He won the tournament with a round to spare scoring 8 points in the first eight rounds.

He took a hiatus from chess concentrating on his Engineering studies but continued to play tournaments at irregular intervals. During this period, Kore stood joint-third in the Indian National Challengers Chess Championship, 2008. In the penultimate round he managed to beat GM Neelotpal Das from a highly inferior position, thus securing one out of nine qualifying spots for the Indian National Premier Chess Championship, 2008 with a round to spare. In the Indian National Premier Chess Championship, he beat GM Parimarjan Negi in one of the rounds.

Kore vs. Satyapragyan, Manglore 2008

Position: a8 black rook, b8 black queen, f8 black rook, g8 black king, b7 black bishop, e7 black bishop, f7 black pawn, g7 black pawn, h7 black pawn, a6 black pawn, c6 black knight, d6 black pawn, e6 black pawn, b5 black pawn, g5 white pawn, d4 white bishop, e4 white pawn, f4 white pawn, h4 white pawn, a3 white pawn, c3 white knight, b2 white pawn, c2 white pawn, f2 white queen, c1 white king, d1 white rook, f1 white bishop, h1 white rook

Indian National Premier Chess Championship, 2008
Here white played 17.Bxg7!?
Kore plays sacrifice which wins the match for White on move 32.
Negi vs. Kore, Manglore 2008

Position: e1 white rook, h2 white pawn, g2 white pawn, a2 black pawn, b4 black rook, d5 black rook, c5 white knight, b5 white king, a5 black pawn, c6 white pawn, h7 black pawn, g7 black pawn, c7 black king

Indian National Premier Chess Championship, 2008
Negi concedes defeat after Black plays 42....Rb4+

=== Since 2012 ===
Kore has been playing active chess since January 2012. He stood joint 2nd in SDAT – RMK 4th Chennai International Open Tournament, also achieving his 1st GM norm in the process. In the 4th Rethymno International Chess Tournament, in Rethymno, Greece, he stood 2nd, thus getting his 2nd GM norm with a Total Performance Rating (TPR) of 2660. His third GM norm came at the 11th Rochefort Chess Tournament, in Roachefort France, 2013. In the 27th Cannes Chess Festival, held at Cannes, France Kore achieved his 4th GM norm and completed the rating requirements for his GM title. En route to this achievement, he also won the tournament with a staggering 2743 TPR. Akshayraj Kore was awarded the "Grandmaster" title by FIDE in its congressional meeting in April 2013.

In Fall of 2013, Kore enrolled for Graduate Program in Computer Science at University of Maryland Baltimore County. In his two years at the university, he helped the team reach finals for the President's Cup. In the 2013 Pan-Am Intercollegiate Championship he beat GM Julio Sadorra in a wild game which involved a King march from g8 to d5 to g5 and back to g8 again. This game was hailed very critical in the success of his team's victory over arch rivals at University of Texas Dallas (UTD). At the concluding President's Cup in 2014, Kore sensationalized the event and the world by beating then rising start Wesley So. Kore was applauded for his originality and aggression in this game. Later that year, Kore also tied for first with Alexander Stripunsky at the Atlantic Open 2014.

Sadorra vs. Kore, Lubbock 2013

Position: h3 white pawn, g4 white pawn, g5 white king, g6 black pawn, f6 black queen, g7 black king, f7 black pawn, d7 white queen, b7 black pawn, a7 black pawn

Pan-Am InterCollegiate Chess Championship, 2013
Kore checkmates Sadorra after his own King performed a walk to the centre
So vs. Kore, New York 2014

Position: h1 white rook, c1 white king, h2 white pawn, g2 white pawn, f2 white pawn, a2 white pawn, d3 white rook, c3 white pawn, g5 white bishop, f6 black knight, b6 black rook, g7 black bishop, c7 black pawn, a7 black pawn, g8 black king, b8 black rook

President's Cup, 2014
Kore creates upset of the tournament when he beats then World No.12 Wesley So
This would be Wesley So's last loss for another year

=== Forray into Chess Coaching ===
Akshayraj Kore also has had a similar success as a Chess Coach.

Kore has helped mentor young talent since he earned his IM title back in 2006. He trained Abhimanyu Puranik, an upcoming Indian Chess player prior to the latter's U-10 World Chess Championship Tournament in 2010. Puranik won bronze medal at the championship. Puranik became a Grandmaster in 2017. The duo worked for two years 2010–11. Shardul Ghagare also trained with Kore during 2011. Ghagare is now himself a Grandmaster. Kore also worked with Advait Patel, an American junior chess player. Kore and Advait worked during the year 2013. Kore has also seconded his close friend and long time colleague, Grandmaster Abhijeet Gupta for a few tournaments during 2012–2013.
