= Zoey Tang =

American chess player (born 2008)

Personal information
- Born: March 16, 2008 (age 18) Beaverton, Oregon

Chess career
- Country: United States
- Title: FIDE Master (2023); Woman Grandmaster (2025)
- Peak rating: 2381 (August 2025)

Zoey Tang (born March 16, 2008) is an American chess player holding the titles of FIDE Master (FM) and Woman Grandmaster (WGM).

== Chess career ==
Tang began playing chess at the age of 7 after learning the game in a library.

In 2021, she won the Girls U14 North American Youth Chess Championship. She was also the Oregon State Champion in 2023 and 2024.

In January 2025, she was awarded the Woman Grandmaster title, being the first player from Oregon to achieve the title.

In July 2025, she won the U.S. Girls' Junior championship, finishing a half-point ahead of runner-up Megan Paragua.

In July 2026, she successfully defended her title, winning the U.S. Girls' Junior Championship for a second consecutive year with a score of 7½/9.

== Personal life ==
Tang graduated from Westview High School in 2026. She is set to attend Stanford University beginning in fall 2026.

She also founded Puddletown Chess, a nonprofit chess organization that helps children learn and play the game.
