= New York State Chess Association =

Chess organization United States

- Type: State Affiliate
- Founded: 1878
- Location: New York; Northern Pennsylvania (Formerly)
- Country: United States
- Major events: New York State Championship; New York State Open
- Website: Official Website

The New York State Chess Association (NYSCA) is the oldest continuously-run chess organization in the United States, having been formed in Auburn, New York in 1878, as the "Western New York and Northern Pennsylvania Chess Association." The NYSCA name has been used since 1886. It is the official New York State affiliate of the United States Chess Federation, and its history pre-dates the establishment of USCF. It organizes a variety of State-sanctioned championship tournaments across New York State, including the annual New York State Chess Championship, which has been held in Albany on Labor Day weekend since 2006.

While the State Championship and State Scholastic Championship has been held in every major city in the state, in recent years the State Championship and State Scholastic Championship has been most successful in the Albany-Saratoga region. The State Scholastic, the oldest of its kind in the US, celebrated its 56th anniversary in Saratoga Springs in February–March 2023.

New York State champions have included Bobby Fischer, Joel Benjamin, José Capablanca, and Frank Marshall. The current -- and 146th annual -- champion is FM William Graif, who earned the title in 2024. The current Scholastic champion is New York City player FM Gus Huston. The article "Hamilton 1941" by Bill Townsend, describing the games of a week-long championship held at Colgate University, won a Chess Journalists of America award for Best Historical Article.

NYSCA currently has several hundred members. Its current president, as of 2025, is New York City chess teacher Sophia Rohde.

Karl Heck is the editor of Empire Chess, the quarterly periodical of NYSCA.

Other major events sponsored by NYSCA include the New York State Open, which has been held in Lake George the past few years. There is a highly successful Girls Championships, which have been held in New York City.

Membership in NYSCA is $20 for one year, and $57 for three years for four printed issues of Empire Chess.

NYSCA also provides funding for its champions to attend the Denker Tournament of High School Champions, the Barber K-8 Championship, Rockefeller Tournament of Elementary School Champions and the Irwin Tournament of Senior Champions.

== New York State champions ==
This is a list of winners of the New York State chess championship, as given by the association. In the early days, the association also included northern Pennsylvania, hence the 1881 championship held in Tunkhannock, Pennsylvania. While current regulations require the title holder to be a resident of New York State, this has not always been the case, hence the win by Swiss master Paul Johner in 1911. For various reasons, in some years no championship was held.

	Year	Champion	Location
1	1878	Judge James R. Cox	Auburn
2	1879	H. A. Richmond	Auburn
3	1880	Rev. Samuel R. Calthrop	Syracuse
4	1881	Rev. John Costello	Tunkhannock, PA
5	1882	George H. Thornton	Buffalo
6	Jan 1883	Rev. Samuel R. Calthrop	Elmira
7	Dec 1883	Niles D. Luce	Elmira
8	1884	Niles D. Luce	Elmira
9	1885	Niles D. Luce	Elmira
10	1886	Dr. J. M. Cassety	Albany
11	1887	Eugene Delmar	New York City
12	1889	Samuel Lipschutz	New York City
13	1890	Eugene Delmar	New York City
14	1891	Eugene Delmar	New York City
15	1892	Albert Hodges	Skaneateles
16	1893	Albert Hodges	New York City
17	1894	Alber Hodges	New York City
18	1895	David Graham Baird	New York City
19	1896	Nicolai Jasnogrodsky	New York City
20	1897	Eugene Delmar	New York City
21	1898	Gustav H. Koehler	New York City
22	1899	Samuel Lipschutz, William M. DeVisser	New York City
23	1900	Eugene Delmar	New York City
24	1901	Julius Finn	New York City
25	1902	Berthold Lasker	New York City
26	1903	Otto Roething	New York City
27	1906	Hermann Helms	New York City
28	1907	Julius Finn	New York City
29	1908	Julius Finn	New York City
30	1909	Clarence Howell	New York City
31	1910	Jose Raoul Capablanca	New York City
32	1911	Paul Johner	New York City
33	1912	Jacob Rosenthal	New York City
34	1913	Leonard B. Meyer, George J. Beihoff	New York City
35	1914	Roy Turnbull Black	New York City
36	1915	Abraham Kupchik	New York City
37	1916	Harold E. Jennings	Buffalo
38	1917	Oscar Chajes	Rochester
39	1918	Kenneth S. Howard	Rochester
40	1919	Abraham Kupchik	Troy
41	1920	Jacob Bernstein	Albany
42	1921	Jacob Bernstein	Syracuse
43	1922	Jacob Bernstein	Buffalo
44	1923	Rudolph Smirka	Buffalo
45	1924	Carlos Torre	Rochester
46	1925	Hermann Helms	Buffalo
47	1926	Milton Hanauer	Rome
48	1927	Rudolph Smirka	Rome
49	1928	Anthony Santasiere	Buffalo
50	1929	Herman Steiner	Buffalo
51	1930	Anthony Santasiere	Utica
52	1931	Fred Reinfeld	Rome
53	1932	Nathan Grossman	Rome
54	1933	Fred Reinfeld	Syracuse
55	1934	Robert Levenstein	Syracuse
56	1935	Isaac Kashdan	Binghamton
57	1936	Isaac Kashdan	Poughkeepsie
58	1937	David Polland	Cazenovia
59	1938	Arnold Denker	Cazenovia
60	1939	Arnold Denker	Hamilton
61	1940	Robert Willman	Hamilton
62	1941		
63	1942		
64	1943		
65	1945		
66	1946		
67	1947		
68	1948		
69	1949		
70	1950		
71	1951		
72	1952		
73	1953		
74	1954		
75	1955		
76	1956		
77	1957		
78	1958		
79	1959		
80	1960		
81	1961		
82	1962		
83	1963		
84	1964		
85	1965		
86	1966		
87	1967		
88	1968		
89	1969		
90	1970		
91	1971		
92	1972		
93	1973		
94	1974		
95	1975		
96	1976		
97	1977		
98	1978		
99	1979		
100	1980		
101	1981		
102	1982		
103	1983		
104	1984		
105	1985		
106	1986		
107	1987		
108	1988		
109	1989		
110	1990		
111	1991		
112	1992		
113	1993		
114	1994		
115	1995		
116	1996		
117	1997		
118	1998		
119	1999		
120	2000		
121	2001		
122	2002		
123	2003		
124	2004		
125	2005		
126	2006		
127	2007		
128	2008		
129	2009		
130	2010		
131	2011		
132	2012		
133	2013		
134	2014		
135	2015		
136	2016		
137	2017		
138	2018		
139	2019		
140	2020		
141	2021		
142	2022		
143	2023		
144	2024		

== See also ==
- Chess in New York (state)
