= Milko Popchev =

Bulgarian chess grandmaster

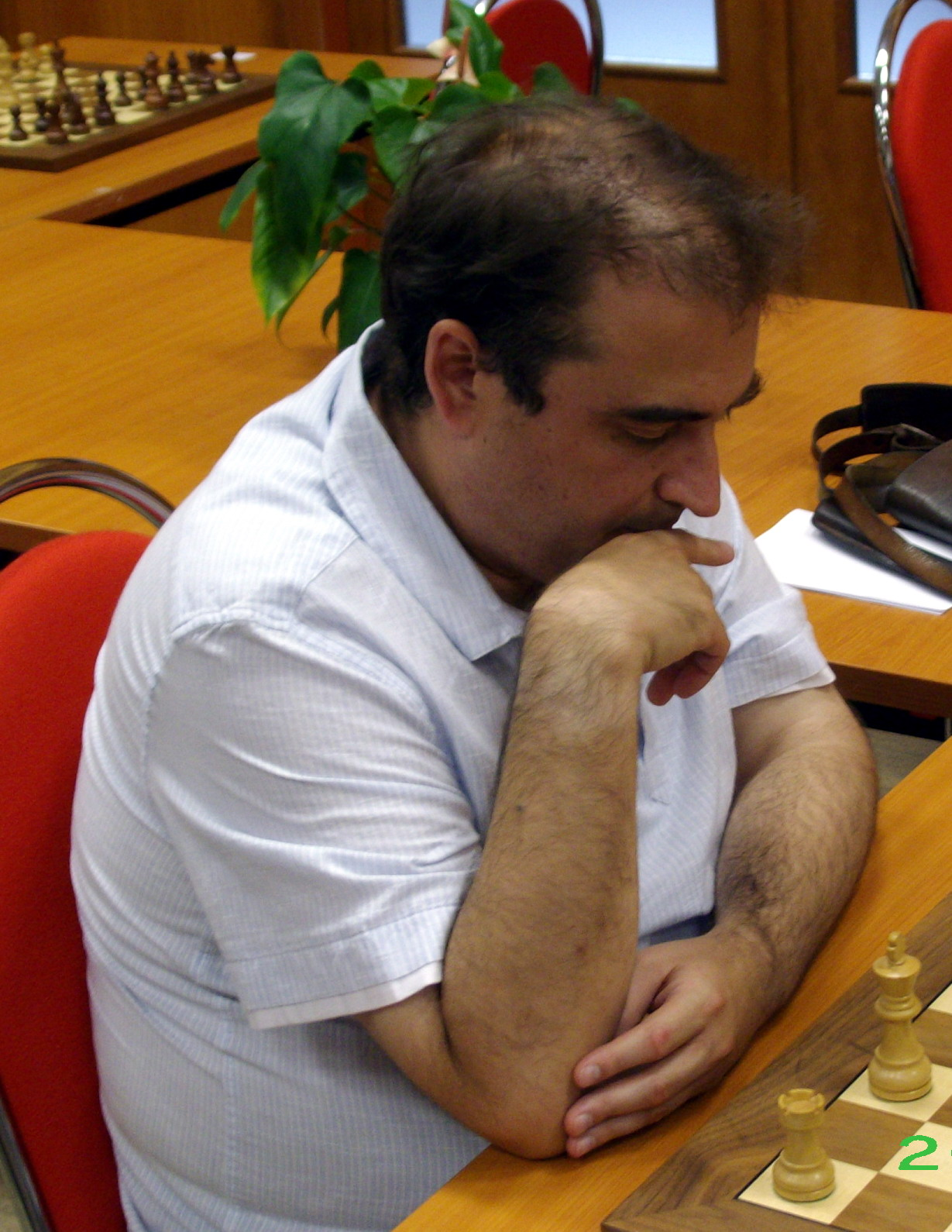
- Popchev 2009

Personal information
- Born: 11 November 1964 (age 61) Plovdiv, Bulgaria

Chess career
- Country: Bulgaria
- Title: Grandmaster (1998)
- Peak rating: 2513 (January 1999)

Milko Popchev (11 November 1964) is a Bulgarian chess grandmaster.

== Biography ==
Popchev was born in Plovdiv in 1964, and became an International Master in 1986 and a Grandmaster in 1998. He played for the Bulgarian national team at the Chess Olympiads 1992 in Manila, and 1998 in Elista. He won the individual gold medal for his board at the 1993 Men's Chess Balkaniads. His peak rating was 2513. However, in recent years, his results have been declining.

In January 2024, Leonid Ivanovic set a new record for being the youngest player to defeat a grandmaster under standard time controls. Ivanovic defeated Popchev at the Novogodisnji rating ŠSB in Belgrade, Serbia at the age of 8 years, 11 months, and 7 days.
