= Awonder Liang =

American chess grandmaster (born 2003)

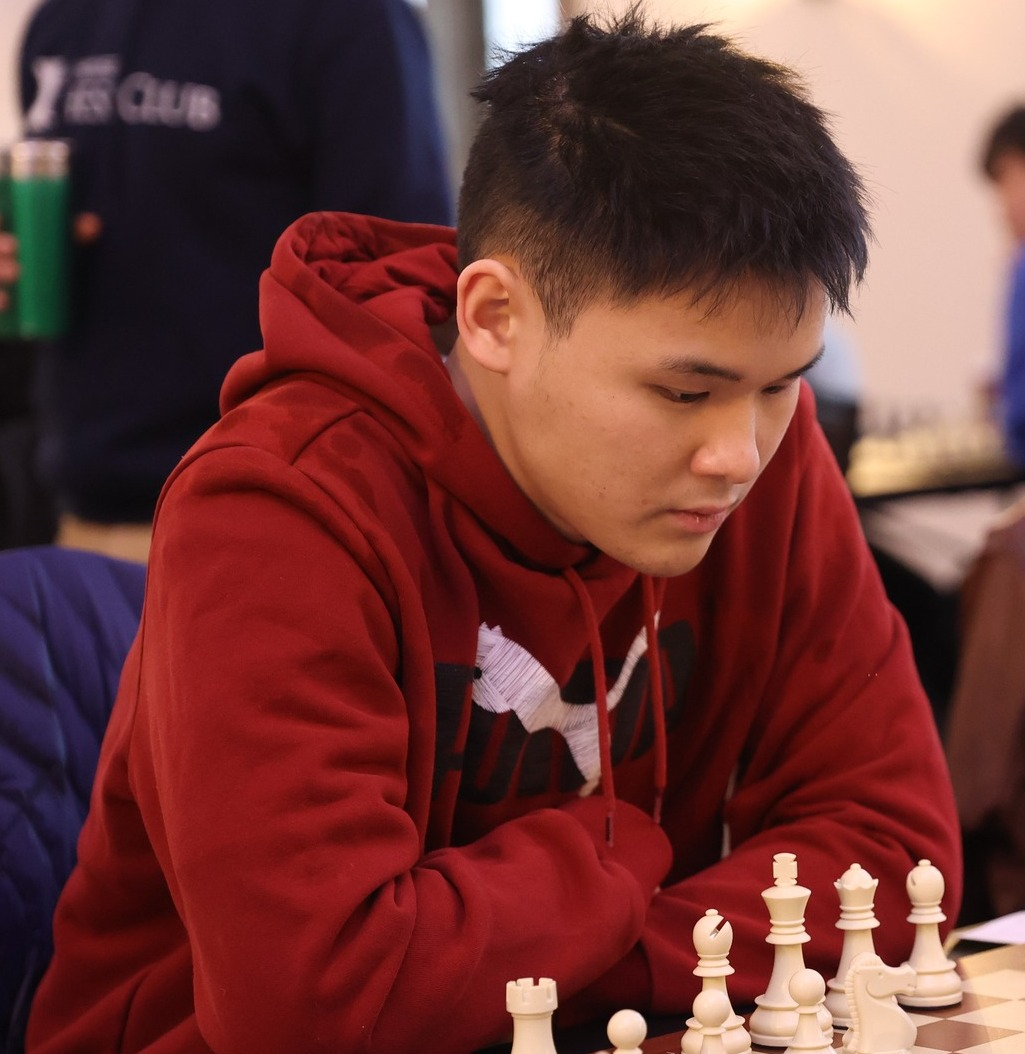
- Liang at Hart House in 2023

Personal information
- Born: April 9, 2003 (age 23) Madison, Wisconsin, U.S.

Chess career
- Country: United States
- Title: Grandmaster (2017)
- FIDE rating: 2685 (November 2026)
- Peak rating: 2719 (February 2026)
- Ranking: No. 39 (November 2026)
- Peak ranking: No. 24 (February 2026)

Awonder Liang (born April 9, 2003) is an American chess grandmaster. A chess prodigy in his youth, he was the third-youngest American to qualify for the title of Grandmaster (after Abhimanyu Mishra and Samuel Sevian), at the age of 14. Liang was twice world champion in his age category.

== Education ==
Liang attended Madison West High School. For middle school, he attended Velma Hamilton Middle School. He was a student at Charles Van Hise Elementary School for elementary school. He graduated from the University of Chicago in 2025 and continued his studies at Webster University, where he is being coached by Lê Quang Liêm.

== Chess career ==
=== 2011 ===
On April 16, 2011, when he played in the Hales Corners Challenge chess tournament in Milwaukee, Wisconsin, Liang became the youngest chess expert in United States Chess Federation (USCF) history with a rating of 2000 at the age of 8 years and 7 days. He broke Samuel Sevian's record of 9 years, 11 months, and 23 days, by 701 days. This record was later broken by Abhimanyu Mishra who became expert at 7 years, 6 months, and 22 days.

On August 5, 2011, at the age of 8 years 118 days, he became the youngest player to defeat an International Master in a standard tournament game. This occurred in round 6 at the U.S. Open in Orlando, Florida, when Liang defeated IM Daniel Fernandez (rated FIDE 2401 and USCF 2448 at that time).

On November 27, 2011, he won the gold medal in the Under 8 section of the World Youth Chess Championships in Caldas Novas, Brazil. This win earned him the titles of Under 8 World Champion and FIDE Master.

=== 2012 ===
On July 29, 2012, he became the youngest player ever to defeat a Grandmaster (GM) in a standard time limit tournament game. It occurred in round 3 of the Washington International in Rockville, Maryland, when he defeated GM Larry Kaufman. Liang was 9 years, 111 days old at the time, breaking the previous record by about 2.5 months. The record was previously held by Shah Hetul at the age of about 9 years, 6 months. At the same time, Liang broke the USA record for the youngest to win against a GM by some months; the previous record having been held by Fabiano Caruana. This record was later broken by 8-year-old Leonid Ivanovic, who defeated Milko Popchev in January 2024.

=== 2013 ===
On March 23, 2013, he became the youngest person ever to obtain the US Chess Federation's National Master title. While playing in the Midwest Open Team Chess Festival in Dayton, Ohio, his win over a Life Master in round 2 brought his estimated USCF rating to 2206. Liang was 17 days shy of his tenth birthday at the time of this achievement, 10 days younger than the age at the previously existing record (held by Samuel Sevian, 7 days prior to his tenth birthday). On September 2, 2015, Maximillian Lu broke Liang's record by 12 days. At the 2013 World Youth Championships, which took place in Al Ain, Liang won the Under 10 section.

=== 2014 ===
On June 30, 2014, at the age of 11 years and 92 days, while competing in the 2nd Annual DC International, he became the youngest American to achieve a norm for the title International Master (IM).

=== 2015 ===
Liang earned his third and final IM norm in Dallas on November 25, 2015 at 12 years, 7 months and 6 days old, thus becoming the youngest American ever to qualify for the title of International Master.

=== 2016 ===
From July 8 to July 17, 2016, Liang participated in the U.S. Junior Closed Championship at the Saint Louis Chess Club. Liang achieved a score of 6/9, earning second place behind Jeffery Xiong, who won with a score of 6½/9. He won four games, drew four, and lost one game to Xiong.

=== 2017 ===
In May 2017, Liang earned his final two Grandmaster norms in back-to-back tournaments at the Spring Chess Classic in St. Louis (Group B) and the Chicago Open. He won the former tournament with a score of 7½/9 and ended up getting 6½/9 at the latter tournament to share 5th to 9th place. At the time, he became the third youngest player in the US to achieve the Grandmaster title. On July 17, 2017, Liang won the US Junior Closed Championship with a score of 6½/9. This earned him a spot in the 2018 US Chess Championship. In October 2017, he also was invited to attend the first ever Jamaican International Chess Festival, winning for his team "Raging Rooks" and winning a prize.

=== 2022 ===
In October 2022, Liang was invited to play in the US Chess Championship as a wild card, finishing 7.5/13 tied for 3rd place, and qualifying to the 2023 Chess World Cup. In March 2023, Awonder led his UChicago B team to their second consecutive US Amateur Team North Championship.

In December 2022, Liang tied for first place with Aram Hakobyan and Abhimanyu Mishra at the 2022 SPICE Cup.

=== 2023 ===
In April 2023, Liang reached the World Top 100 for the first time, with a FIDE rating of 2651.

In May 2023, Liang tied for first place with Jianchao Zhou and Emilio Cordova at the 2023 Chicago Open.

Liang qualified for the 2023 World Cup, where he defeated Alisher Karimov in the first round, but lost to Mustafa Yilmaz in the Rapid tiebreaks in the second round and was eliminated from the tournament.

=== 2024 ===
In July 2024, Liang won the 52nd World Open.

In October 2024, Liang scored 5.5 points in the 2024 U.S. Chess Championship, scoring 3 wins, 5 draws, and 2 losses, combined with an unplayed game following Christopher Yoo's expulsion from the event. Liang tied for second place in that tournament behind tournament winner Fabiano Caruana.

=== 2025 ===
In November 2025, Liang won the U.S. Masters Chess Championship after defeating Andrew Hong in a playoff.

=== 2026 ===
Liang played Nakamura in a training match leading up to the latter's appearance in the Candidates Tournament 2026. He won 6-4, drawing the two-game classical portion and scoring wins in the rapid portion.

=== Bughouse ===
Liang is also an accomplished Bughouse chess player. With his partner Jeffery Xiong, he won the Bughouse World Championship in 2021 and 2022. On January 27, 2025, he was ranked 1st worldwide in Bughouse on the site Chess.com, with a rating of 2928.

Achievements
Preceded by Samuel Sevian	Youngest ever United States chessmaster 2013–15	Succeeded by Maximillian Lu
Preceded by Samuel Sevian	Youngest ever United States International Master; 2015–present	Succeeded by Incumbent
