= Kateřina Němcová =

Czech-American chess player (born 1990)

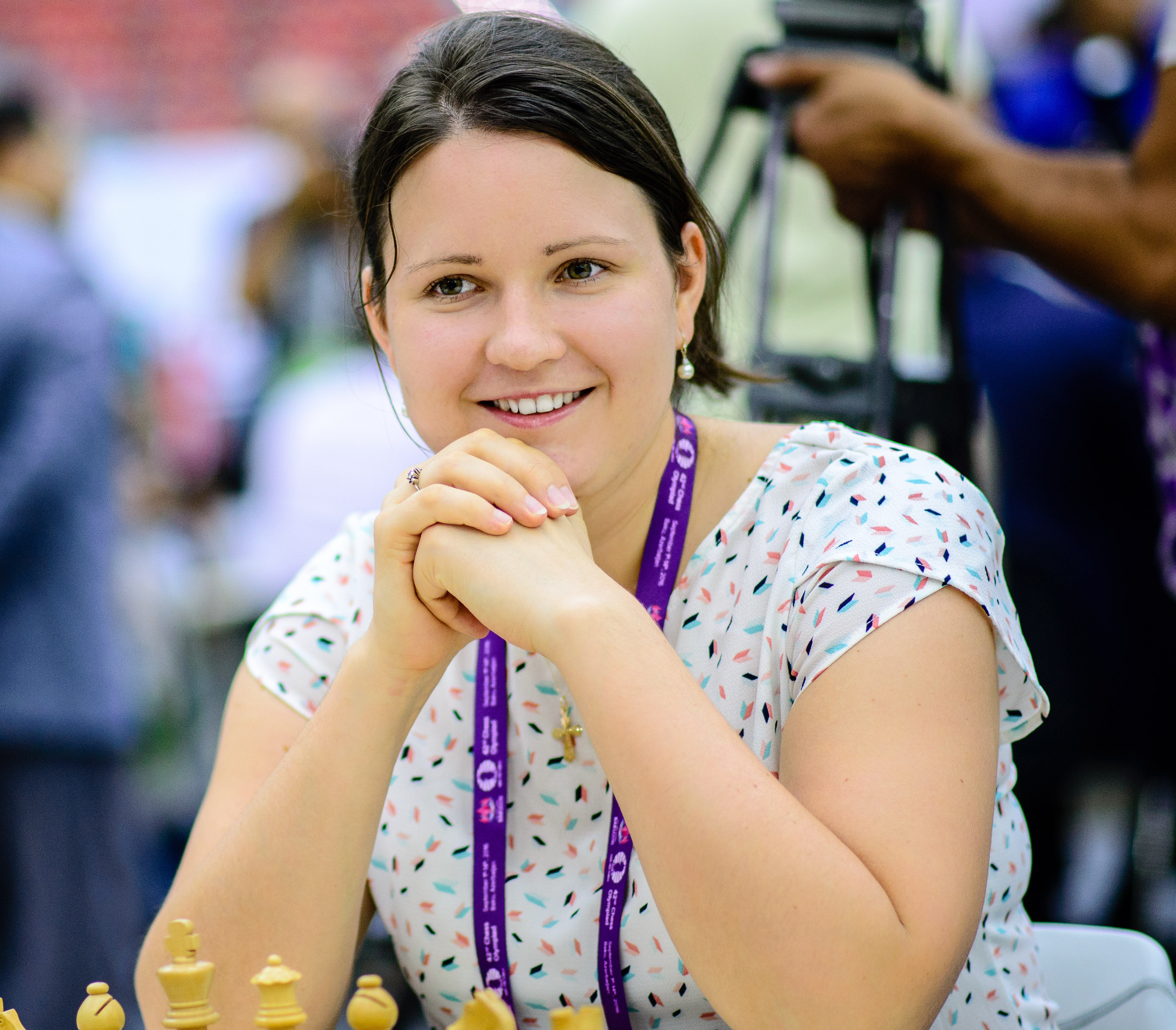
- Němcová in 2016

Personal information
- Born: November 14, 1990 (age 35) Prague, Czechoslovakia

Chess career
- Country: Czech Republic (until 2013); United States (since 2013)
- Title: Woman Grandmaster (2008)
- Peak rating: 2382 (April 2013)

Kateřina Němcová (born November 14, 1990) is a Czech and American chess player holding the title of Woman Grandmaster (WGM). She was women's Czech champion in 2008 and 2010. She came second in the World Youth Chess Championship of 2007 and won the European Youth Chess Championship of 2008.

Němcová transferred national federations from Czech Republic to the United States in 2013. She competed in the Women's World Chess Championship in 2017.

Němcová attended Webster University, where she was a member of Susan Polgar's and Paul Truong's SPICE (Susan Polgar Institute for Chess Excellence) Program.
