= Arthur Guo =

American chess grandmaster (born 2006)

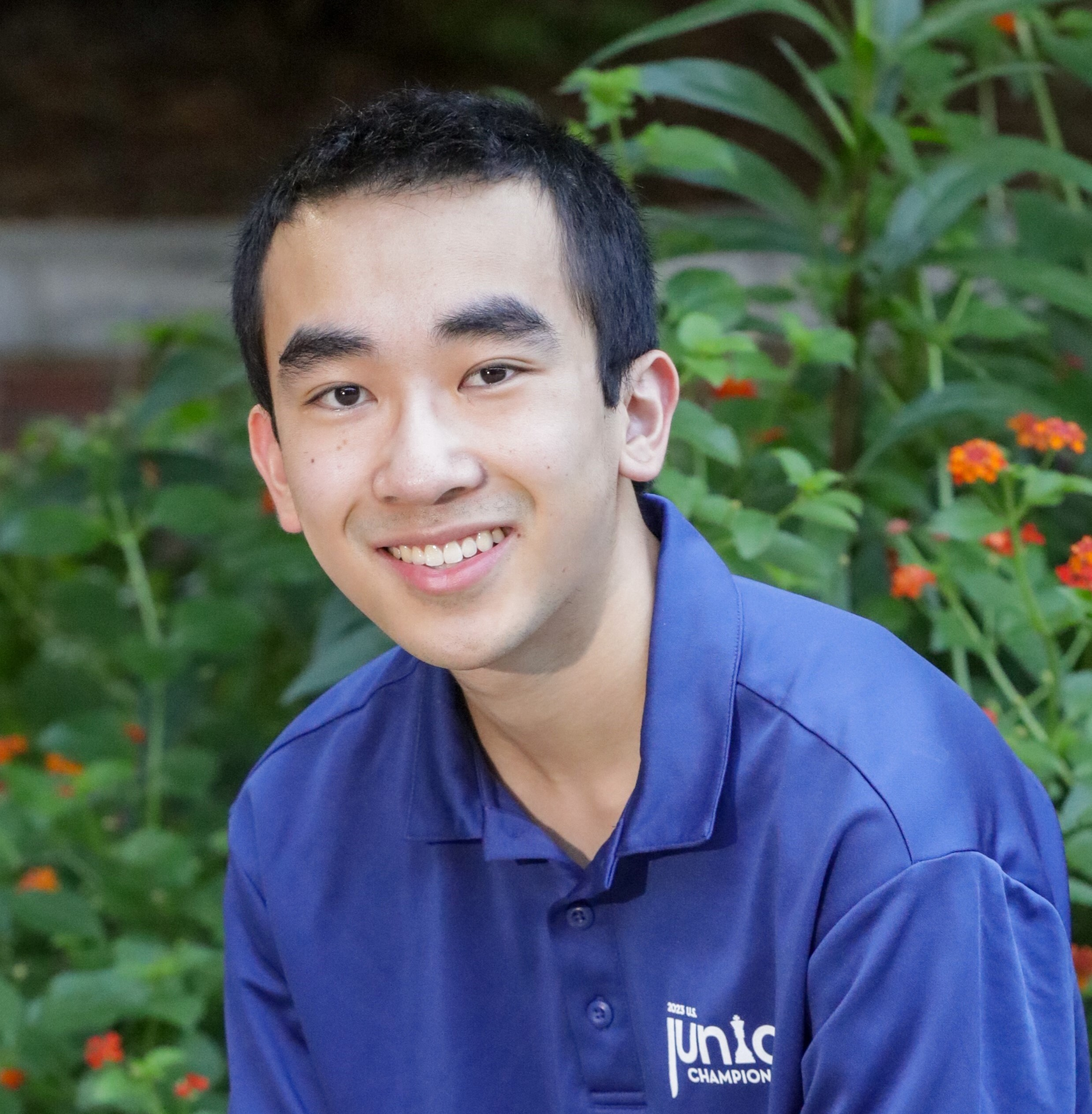

Personal information
- Born: May 19, 2006 (age 20) Atlanta, Georgia, U.S.

Chess career
- Country: United States
- Title: Grandmaster (2023)
- FIDE rating: 2525 (July 2026)
- Peak rating: 2529 (September 2023)

Arthur Guo (born May 19, 2006) is an American chess grandmaster from Atlanta, Georgia. He is a nine-time National Chess Champion and also a three-time International Gold Medalist/Champion. Guo earned the FIDE title of Grandmaster (GM) in July 2023 soon after he turned 17. As of January 1, 2024, he is the highest-rated 17-year-old in the country and is ranked No. 29 among juniors (under 21) in the world.

== Chess career ==
Guo picked up chess by accident from a free community chess class offered by a local library in Atlanta in late 2011. Soon after, he played his first chess tournament in January 2012. In December of the same year, he became the co-champion of the National K-12 Grade Championships held in Orlando, FL, in the first-grade section.

In July 2014, Guo won the gold medal for Team USA in the Pan American Youth (U8) in Oaxtaepec, Morelos, Mexico.

In May 2016, Guo won the National Elementary (K-6) Championship as a 4th grader in Dallas.

In July 2016, Guo became the gold medalist in the Pan American Youth Chess Championship (U12) with an 8/9 score in Montevideo, Uruguay. He was awarded the FIDE Master Title.

In April 2018, Guo won the National Junior High (K-9) Champion as a 6th grader in Atlanta.He became the second person in US chess history to win both K-6 and K-9 national tournaments in their early chess career.

On June 24, 2018, at the age of 12 years, one month and five days, Guo earned the International Master title by scoring 7/9 and tying for the first at the Pan American Junior (U20) Chess Championship in Guayaquil, Ecuador. He was the youngest American in U.S. chess history to hold the title until surpassed by Christopher Yoo six months later.

In November 2018, Guo tied for second in the World Cadets Chess Championship (U12) in Santiago de Compostela, Spain.

In June 2021, Guo won the National Open at the age of 15 in Las Vegas ahead of Grandmasters Illia Nyzhnyk, Andrew Hong, Emilio Córdova, and Lázaro Bruzón due to having the best tiebreaker results. Guo achieved his first GM norm in the tournament which featured a strong field of 22 Grandmasters (GM) and 29 International Masters (IM). Past winners of the tournament include Super GM Wesley So.

Guo was the 2022 National High School Champion by winning first-place in the National High School (K-12) Championship with a score of 6/7 in Memphis. He was also the champion of the 2021 National K-12 Blitz Chess Championship in Orlando.

Guo won the Denker National Tournament of High School State Champions back-to-back in 2022 and 2023. In August 2023, he won the tournament clear first with a score of 6/6, the only perfect score in the last 30 years of tournament history.

In August 2023, Guo led the #6 seed Georgia team to capture the National Invitational Team Championship.

In 2023 US Junior Championship, Guo debuted with a second-place finish on tiebreak with a score of 5.5/9. The tournament featured ten of the "best of the best of America's chess youths" 20 years or under.

In May and June 2023, Guo made back-to-back GM norms by earning 6.5/9 points at the Six Days Budapest GM Round Robin and scoring five wins and four draws with a final score of 7/9 at the First Saturday GM tournament in Budapest, Hungary. Two weeks later he broke the 2500 FIDE rating and achieved his fourth GM norm with a 6.5/9 score at the SPARKASSEN CHESS TROPHY 2023 in Dortmund, Germany.

In December 2023, FIDE officially awarded him Grandmaster title during the 3rd FIDE Council Meeting. Guo was the only American granted a GM title from late October 2022 through March 2024.

The May 2024 issue of the Chess Life Magazine published Guo's chess essay, "Achieving My Aim", in which Guo detailed the ups and downs of his 12-year journey to the Chess Grandmaster (GM) title.

== Education ==
Guo graduated from The Westminster Schools in Atlanta, and is a student at Yale University, the first Ivy League school to have two grandmasters pursuing undergraduate studies simultaneously. He is also a nationally top-ranked policy debater and a Tournament of Champions (TOC) qualifier.
