= Tanitoluwa Adewumi =

American chess player (born 2010)

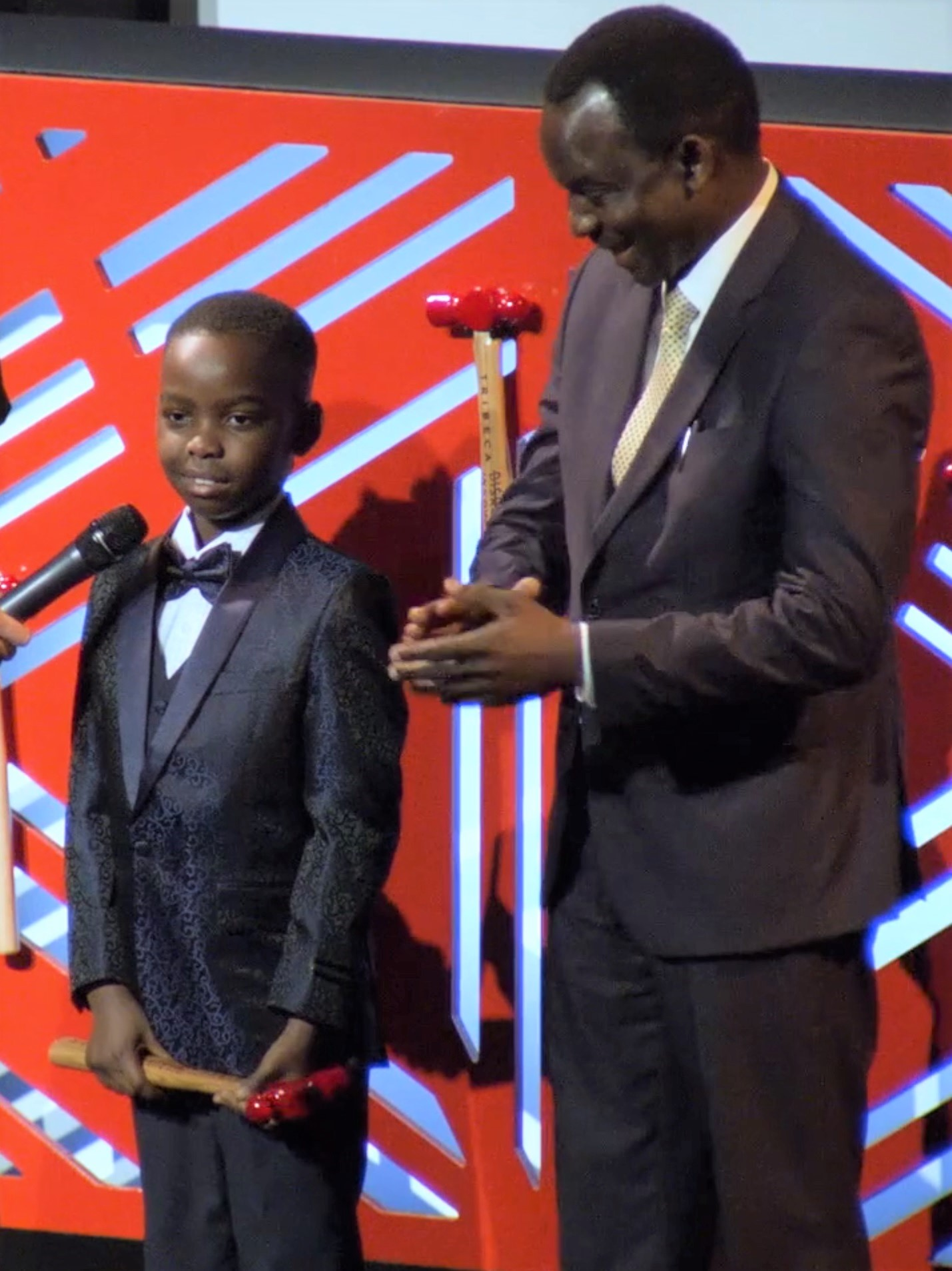
- Adewumi (left), receiving 2019 Tribeca Disruptive Innovation award as his father applauds

Personal information
- Born: Tanitoluwa Emmanuel Adewumi; September 3, 2010 (age 16) Nigeria

Chess career
- Country: United States
- Title: International Master (2025)
- FIDE rating: 2477 (November 2026)
- Peak rating: 2487 (August 2026)

Tanitoluwa Emmanuel "Tani" Adewumi (born September 3, 2010) is a Nigerian-American chess player who currently holds the title of International Master (IM). A chess prodigy, he won the 2019 K-3 New York State chess championship at the age of eight after having played the game for only a year while living with his refugee family in a homeless shelter in Manhattan.

== Early life ==
Tanitoluwa is the son of Kayode James Adewumi (born June 24, 1976, Ado Ekiti, Nigeria) and Oluwatoyin Kuburat Adewumi (born June 16, 1981, Ado Ekiti). He has a brother who is seven years older. Kayode used to run a print shop in the Nigerian capital, Abuja, with 13 employees, and Oluwatoyin used to work as an accountant.

Adewumi's family is devoutly Christian and have been threatened with violence by the Islamist terrorist organization Boko Haram. In June 2017, they left Nigeria for the United States and sought religious asylum. Philip Falayi, a pastor in Queens, New York City, gave them temporary accommodation, and connected them with the New York City Department of Homeless Services. They were given a place to stay in a homeless shelter in Manhattan. Kayode took work as a dishwasher and as an Uber driver in a rented car, while Oluwatoyin worked as a cleaner. (Note: By March 2019, Kayode was working as an Uber driver and as a licensed real estate salesman, and Oluwatoyin as a qualified home health aide.) Tanitoluwa enrolled in elementary school P.S. 116.

In October 2022, Adewumi and his family were granted asylum in the United States. This status allowed the family to remain in the US permanently and allowed Adewumi to travel internationally to compete in chess tournaments.

== Chess career ==
Shawn Martinez, the head chess coach at P.S. 116, introduced students to the game. Tanitoluwa immediately took to it and wanted to join a club run by 1700-rated coach Russell Makofsky. That would have been expensive; the $330 fee included not only the cost of running the club, but also such things as entries to tournaments, travel, and accommodation. When Adewumi's mother told Makofsky of the family's financial situation, he waived the fee. In early 2018, Adewumi, who had been assigned the lowest estimated rating of 105, played in his first tournament. A year later, he had accumulated seven trophies. His coaches were impressed by his dedication and hard work and by the progress he had made since starting as a novice.

On March 9–10, 2019, he competed in the 52nd Annual New York State Scholastic Championships (kindergarten-3rd grade division) in Saratoga Springs, New York. He was seeded eighth in a field of 74 with an Elo rating of 1473, more than 200 behind the top rated players. He won the event outright with a score of 5.5/6 (five wins, one draw, no losses). His style of play is aggressive: in his fourth game he sacrificed a bishop for a pawn, which was the best move according to a chess engine.

On May 1, 2021, at 10 years old, Adewumi crossed the 2200 Elo rating threshold needed to achieve the official USCF title of National Master, making him the 28th-youngest chess player in history ever to do so. In August, he won the under-12 division of the North American Youth Chess Championship with a score of 8/9. He became a FIDE Master, having surpassed a FIDE rating of 2300 in November 2021.

In April 2022, he scored 7/9 in the New York Spring Invitational Norm event, earning his first IM norm. In July 2022, he scored 7/9 in the New York Summer Invitational, winning the IM C event and earning his second IM norm. In November 2022 he earned a third IM norm, scoring 5.5/9 at the 2022 New York Fall Invitational in the GM B event. Due to a rule change from FIDE in early 2022, Adewumi still needed an additional norm from an individual Swiss tournament (as well as reaching 2400 Elo) to be granted the IM title. In February 2024, he earned a fourth IM norm, scoring 5.5/9 at the 2024 Southwest Class Championship, an open Swiss tournament. He became an International Master, having achieved the required norms and surpassed a FIDE rating of 2400 in 2025.

In March 2026, he scored 6/9 at the 2026 Saint Louis Masters, a top open tournament included in the 2026–2027 FIDE Circuit, finishing seventh and earning his first GM norm.

In November 2026, he earned his 2nd GM norm by scoring 7/9 (+5-0=4) at the 2026 NYC Norms Fall 6-Day GM, or in short, the Fall GM Invitational, with a 2604 performance rating.

== Reception and media ==
In 2019, the story of his winning the New York Scholastics was reported by Nicholas Kristof in the New York Times, and rapidly attracted national and international attention both inside and outside the chess world. Agadmator, a leading chess YouTuber, published an analysis of Adewumi's only available game from the tournament. (Note: Not the game with the bishop sacrifice.) Garry Kasparov, former World Chess Champion, praised this achievement by a refugee immigrant. Bill Clinton, former U.S. president, invited him to visit him in his office in Harlem, New York, and he did. Abike Dabiri, Senior Special Assistant on Foreign Affairs and Diaspora to Nigerian president Muhammadu Buhari, called him "a pride to the nation".

On March 30, 2019, he visited the Saint Louis Chess Club in Missouri, where the U.S. Chess Championship was then in progress, and played several friendly blitz (5 minutes for each player) games, his opponents including Hikaru Nakamura (GM, five-time U.S. Chess Champion), Jennifer Yu (WGM, 2019 U.S. Women's Chess Champion), and Fabiano Caruana (GM and 2018 World Chess Championship challenger), and was interviewed by Maurice Ashley, the world's first Black GM.

His coaches set up a GoFundMe site shortly after the New York competition, with the target of raising $50,000 for the family by crowdfunding. It raised $254,000 in ten days. Benefactors also offered non-monetary help; including accommodation, a car, academic scholarships, chess books, and pro bono (i.e., free) assistance by immigration lawyers with their asylum application. They accepted one of the more modest offers of accommodation, declined the scholarship offers out of loyalty to P.S. 116, gave one-tenth of the donated money as a tithe to the church which had helped them, and put the rest into a 501(c)(3) trust called the Tanitoluwa Adewumi Foundation to help other children in similar circumstances.

He had expressed an ambition to become the youngest ever chess grandmaster, though from February 2023 this is no longer possible. (Note: As of July 2022, Abhimanyu Mishra is the youngest person to have achieved the title of Grandmaster (at 12 years 4 months).) Three film companies bid on the rights to his story; Paramount Pictures won. A biography, My Name Is Tani ... and I Believe in Miracles, was published on April 14, 2020.
