= Chess in Armenia =

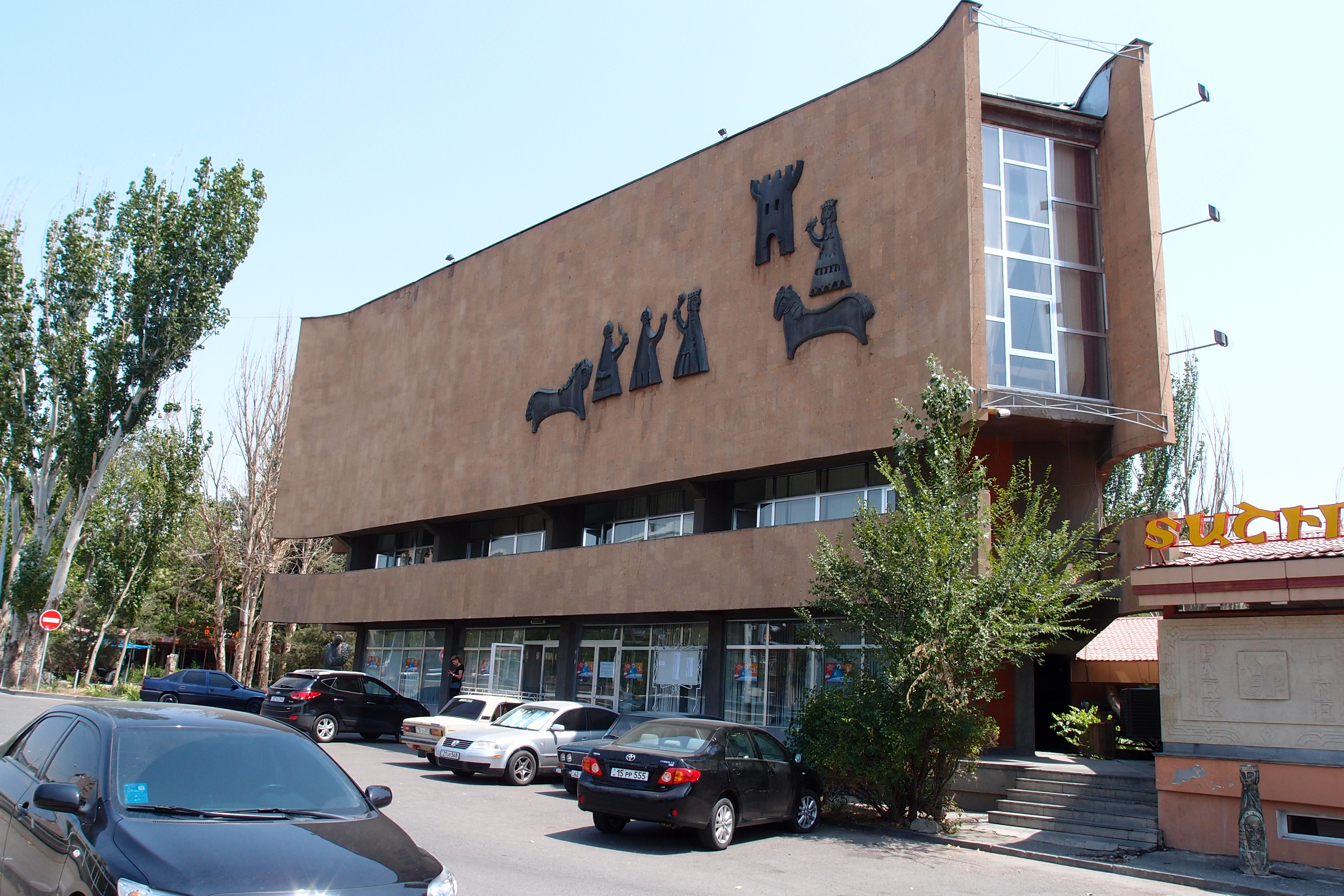
The House of Chess in Yerevan, founded in 1970

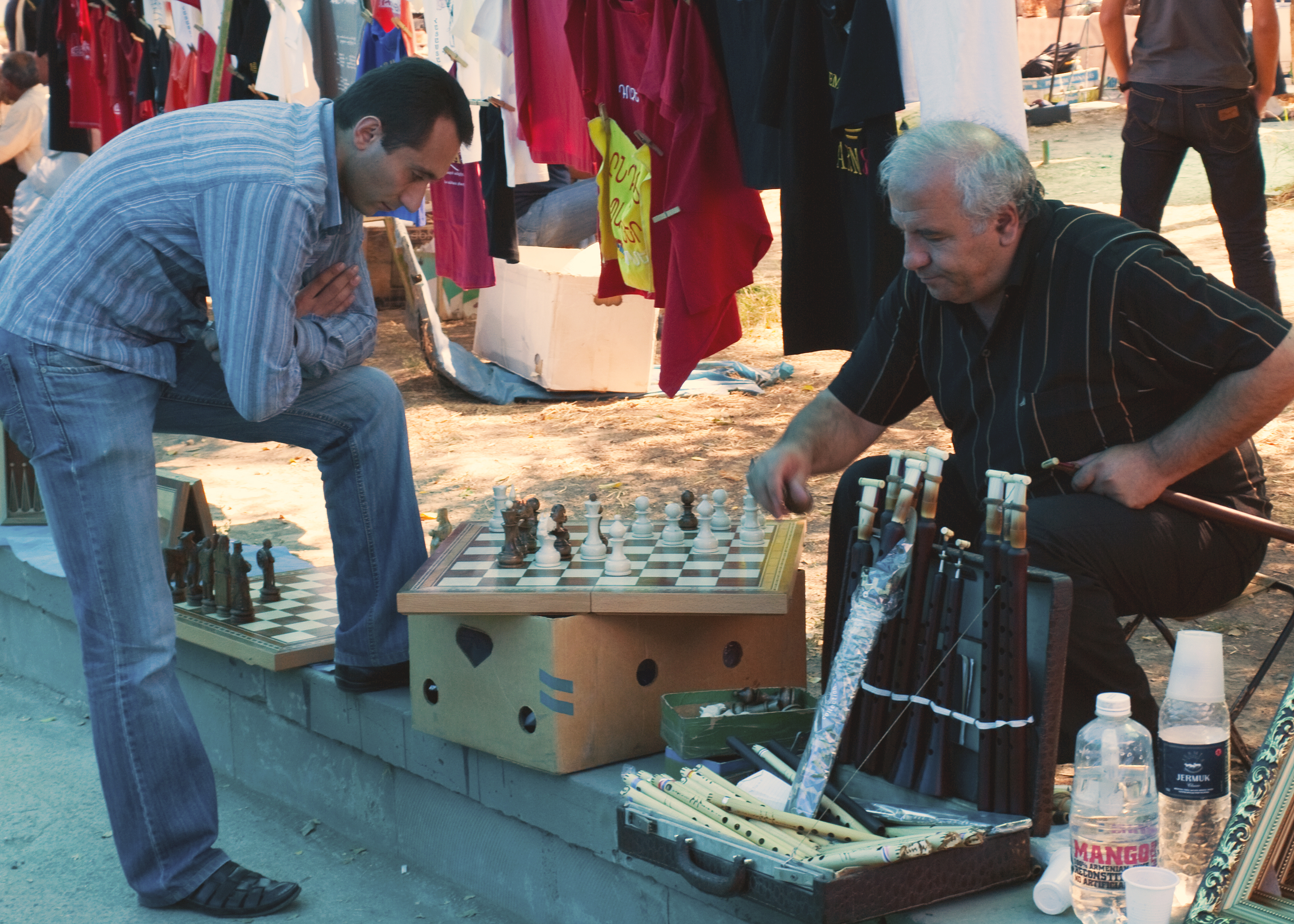
Two men playing chess in Yerevan Vernissage

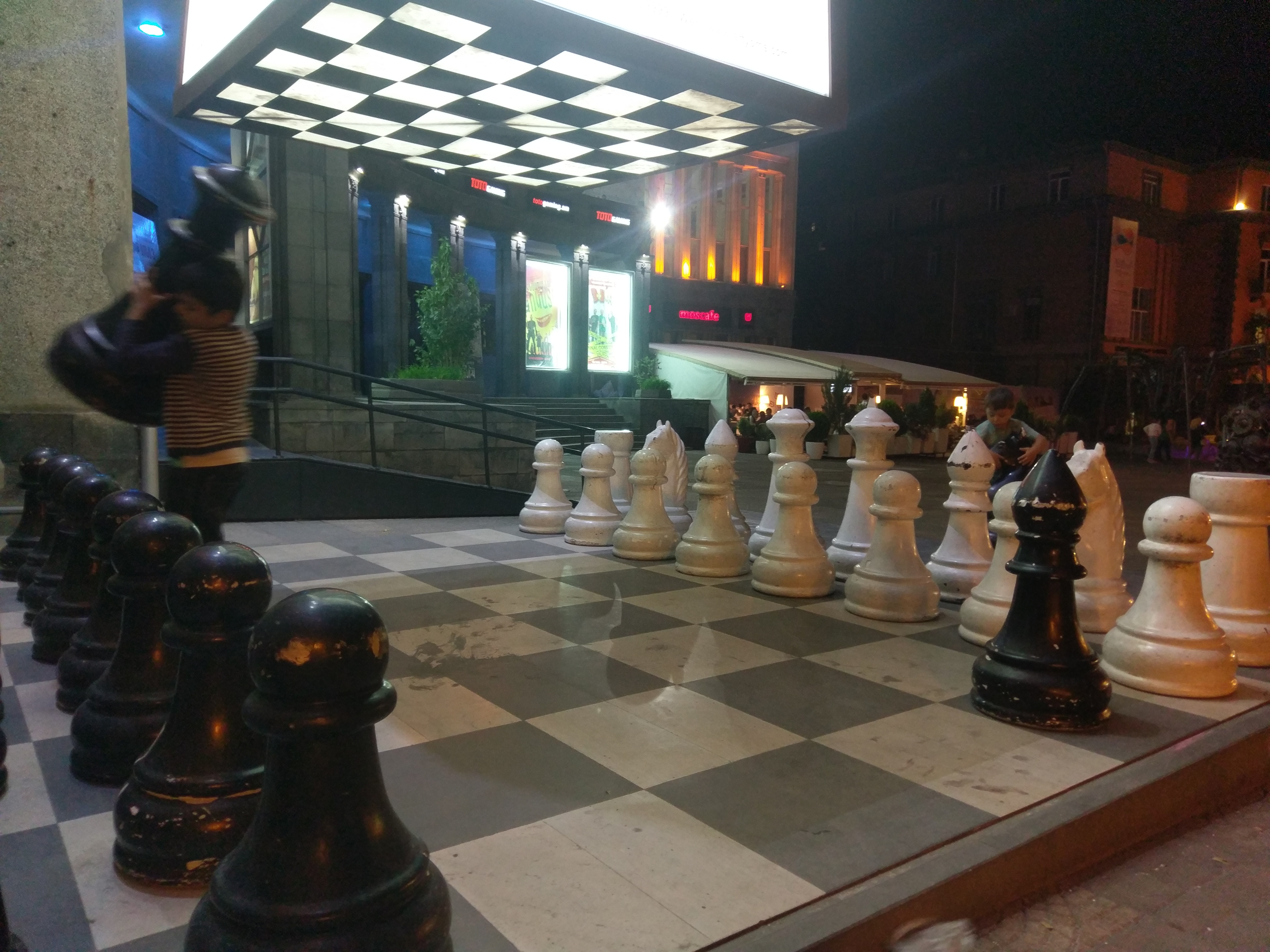
Children playing at an outdoor chess set in Charles Aznavour Square of Yerevan

Chess has been played in Armenia since the early Middle Ages; however, it was institutionalized during the early Soviet period. Highly popular in Armenia today, chess gained widespread recognition during the 1960s, when Soviet Armenian grandmaster Tigran Petrosian became the World Chess Champion. A country of about three million people, Armenia is considered one of the strongest chess nations today, and a chess superpower. Among countries, Armenia has one of the highest numbers of chess grandmasters per capita.

Since the country's independence, the Armenian men's chess team has won the European Team Championship (1999), the World Team Championship (2011) and the Chess Olympiad (2006, 2008, 2012). The women's team had its crowning victory at the 2003 European Championship. As of May 2026, Armenia ranks thirteenth in the world by the average rating of its top players. Levon Aronian, formerly Armenia's best chess player, has placed as high as world No. 2 in the FIDE rankings, and has been a World Champion candidate on six occasions.

Since the 2011–12 school year, chess lessons have been made part of the curriculum in every public school in Armenia, making it the first country in the world to make chess mandatory in schools.

== Name ==
Until the early 20th century, chess was known in Armenian as čatrak (ճատրակ), from Middle Persian chatrang. Another name was ճատրկուց, čatrkuts. Today, that term—pronounced jadrag—is only used in Western Armenian, which is spoken in the Armenian diaspora. In modern Eastern Armenian, the variation used in Armenia, chess is known as šaxmat շախմատ ([ʃɑχmɑt]). It is derived from Russian šáxmaty (шахматы), itself a derivative from Persian šâh mât (شاه مات), literally meaning "the king is at a loss" or "the king is helpless." The latter Persian phrase is also the etymology of the English checkmate.

== History ==
=== Early history ===
In their 1936 book on the history of chess, Joseph Orbeli and Kamilla Trever suggest that chess was known in Armenia since at least the 9th century during the Arab rule, having been introduced from India, where the game is believed to have been originated in the sixth century as Chaturanga. In 1967 chess pieces were excavated by archaeologists in the citadel of Dvin, the medieval Armenian capital. Chess is mentioned in manuscripts from the 12th–13th centuries, kept in the Matenadaran in Yerevan, including by Vardan Areveltsi and Mkhitar Anetsi. Until the mid-20th century villagers in Shenavan, in the Aparan area, used homemade chess figures similar to medieval ones.

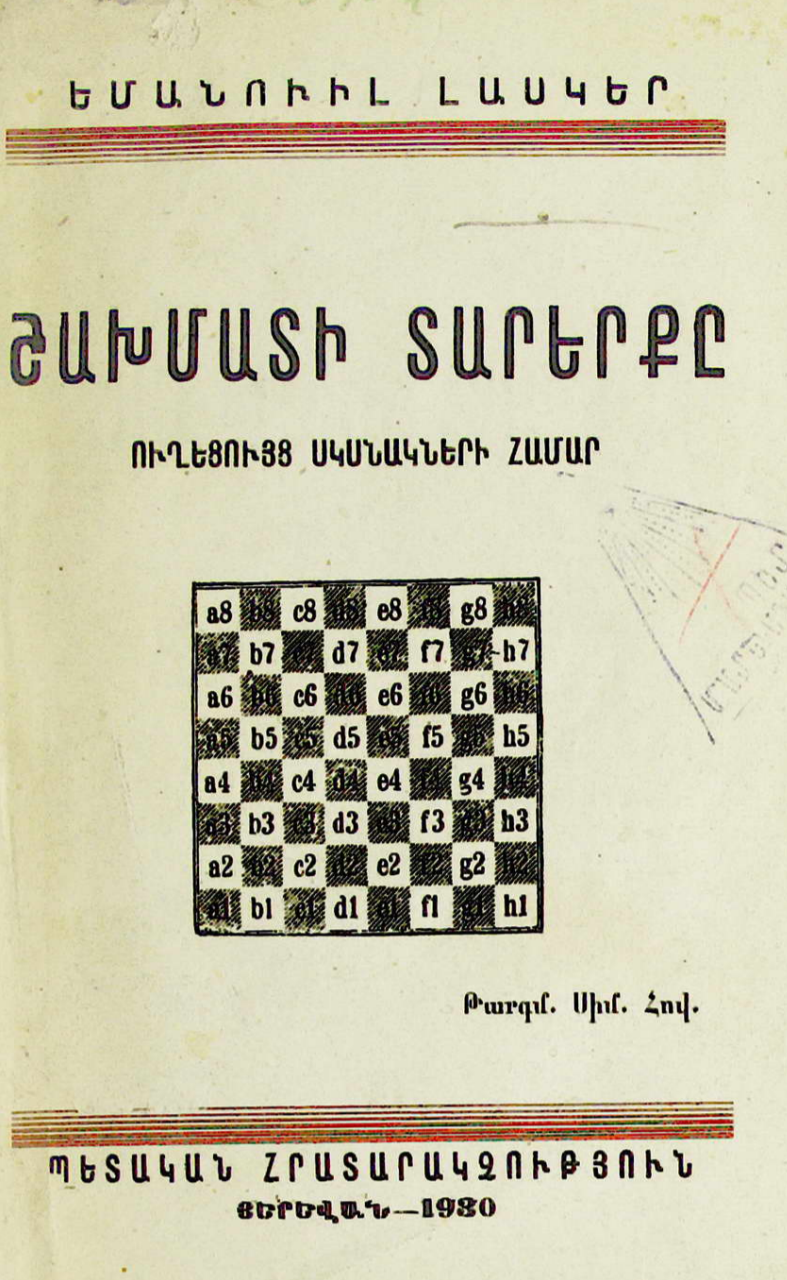
A 1930 Armenian translation of Emanuel Lasker's books on chess by Simon Hovyan.

=== Soviet period ===
Chess in Armenia was institutionalized after the establishment of Soviet rule in 1920. In 1926-27, chemist Simon Hovyan (1869-1942) spearheaded an initiative to introduce sections dedicated to chess in numerous Armenian newspapers. He played a crucial role in the widespread popularization of the game by providing lectures on the rules and strategy of chess, as well as translating books by Emanuel Lasker, Ilya Maizelis (ru), and Yakov Rokhlin (ru) into Armenian.

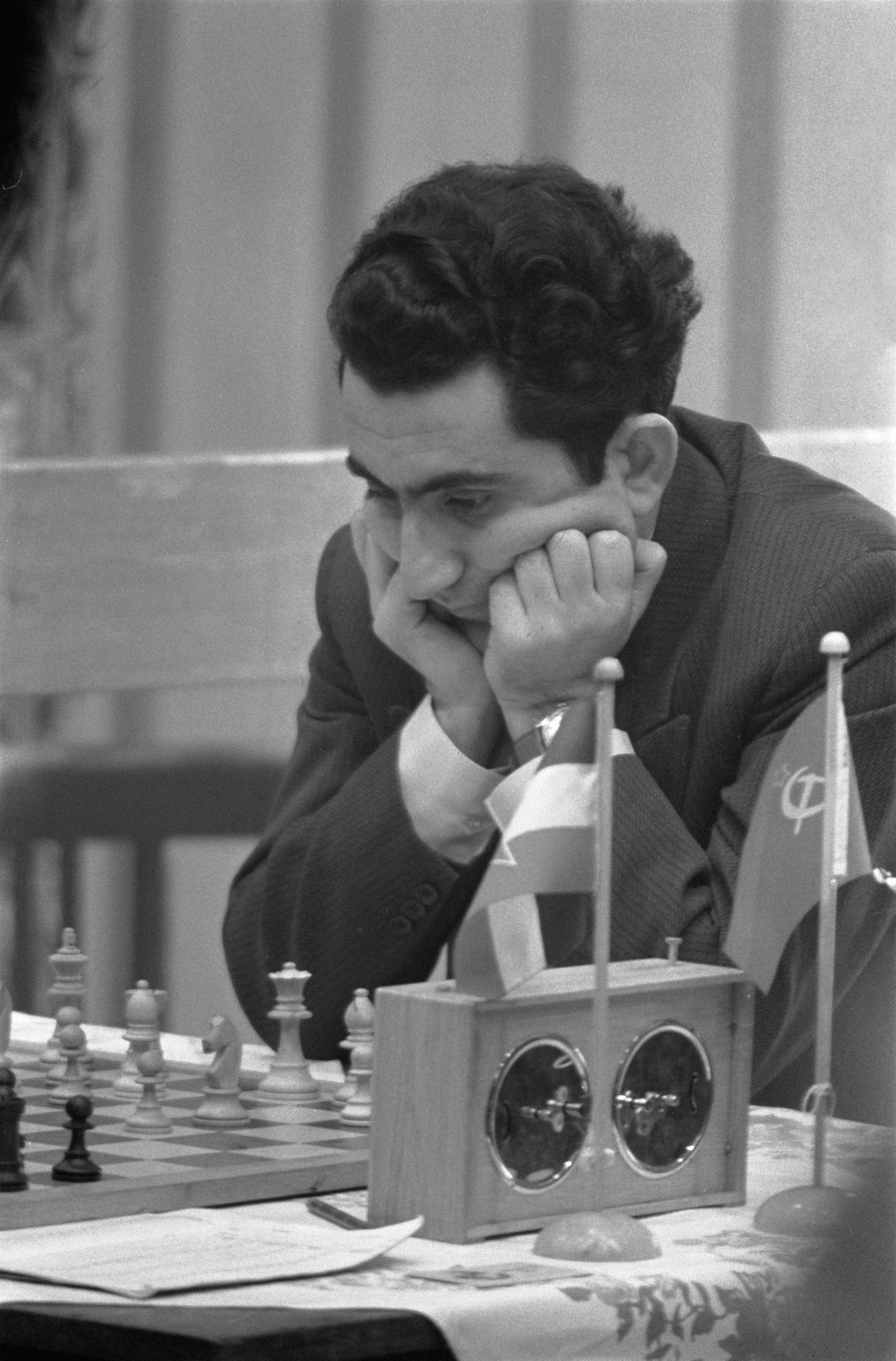
Tigran Petrosian, World Chess Champion in 1963–69

The first chess competitions were held in 1927, when the Armenian Chess Federation was founded. Until 1934 chess players from Armenia competed in the Transcaucasian championship. In 1934 the first Armenian Chess Championship was held in Yerevan. Genrikh Kasparyan became its winner. In later years Kasparyan won the championship nine times and became the most-titled Armenian chess player with ten national championship wins. The women's championship was also held the same year, Sirush Makints and Margarita Mirza-Avagian shared the champion title. The first Armenian chess club was founded in Yerevan in 1936. Chess clubs were also founded in Leninakan (now Gyumri) and Kirovakan (now Vanadzor) in the 1950s. By the early 1980s all towns and districts (rayons) of Soviet Armenia had chess clubs.

Chess became particularly popular with the unprecedented success of Tigran Petrosian in the 1960s. Born in Tiflis, the current capital of Armenia's neighbor Georgia, he started his ascent in Armenia with a 1946 victory at the national championship. He then won the Soviet champion title four times (1959, 1961, 1969, 1975). In 1963 Petrosian became the World Chess Champion, defeating Mikhail Botvinnik, another Soviet representative. Petrosian's victory not only popularized the game of chess, but also "led to an outpouring of patriotic fervour" in the smallest Soviet republic. "From that moment on, chess became a national obsession." Many couples named their sons Tigran, after Petrosian. Besides being World Champion for six years (1963 to 1969), Petrosian won the Chess Olympiad nine times with the Soviet team (1958 to 1974).

The USSR Chess Championship was held in Yerevan twice, in 1962 and 1975.

In 1962, there were 30,000 chess players in Soviet Armenia, as well as 3,000 instructors and judges. By 1986 the number of chess players had increased to 50,000, including three grandmasters: Rafael Vaganian, Smbat Lputian, and Arshak Petrosian. In the late Soviet period, Rafael Vaganian (1989) and Artashes Minasian (1991) became Soviet Champions. Vaganian also won the Olympiad with the Soviet team twice in 1984 and 1986.

=== Independent Armenia ===
Armenia gained its independence from the Soviet Union in 1991. Since then, Armenian chess players have had the opportunity to represent the Republic of Armenia. Three major chess tournaments have taken place in independent Armenia: the 32nd Chess Olympiad was held at the Sports & Music Complex in Yerevan in 1996; the 2001 World Team Chess Championship and the 2014 European Individual Chess Championship were held at the Yerevan Opera Theater.

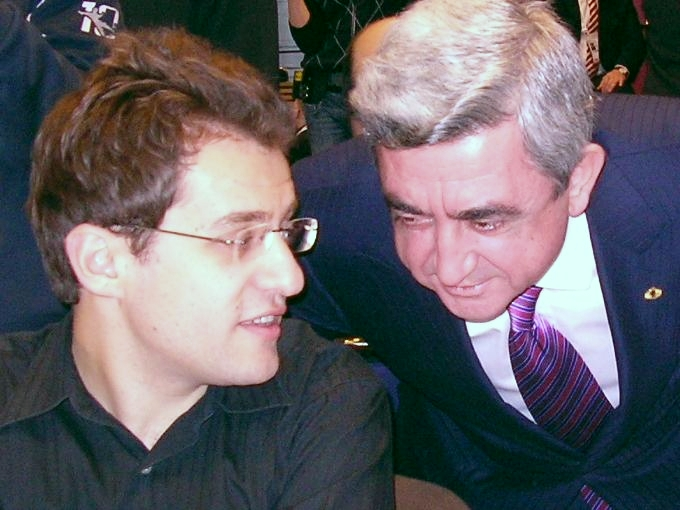
Levon Aronian and Serzh Sargsyan

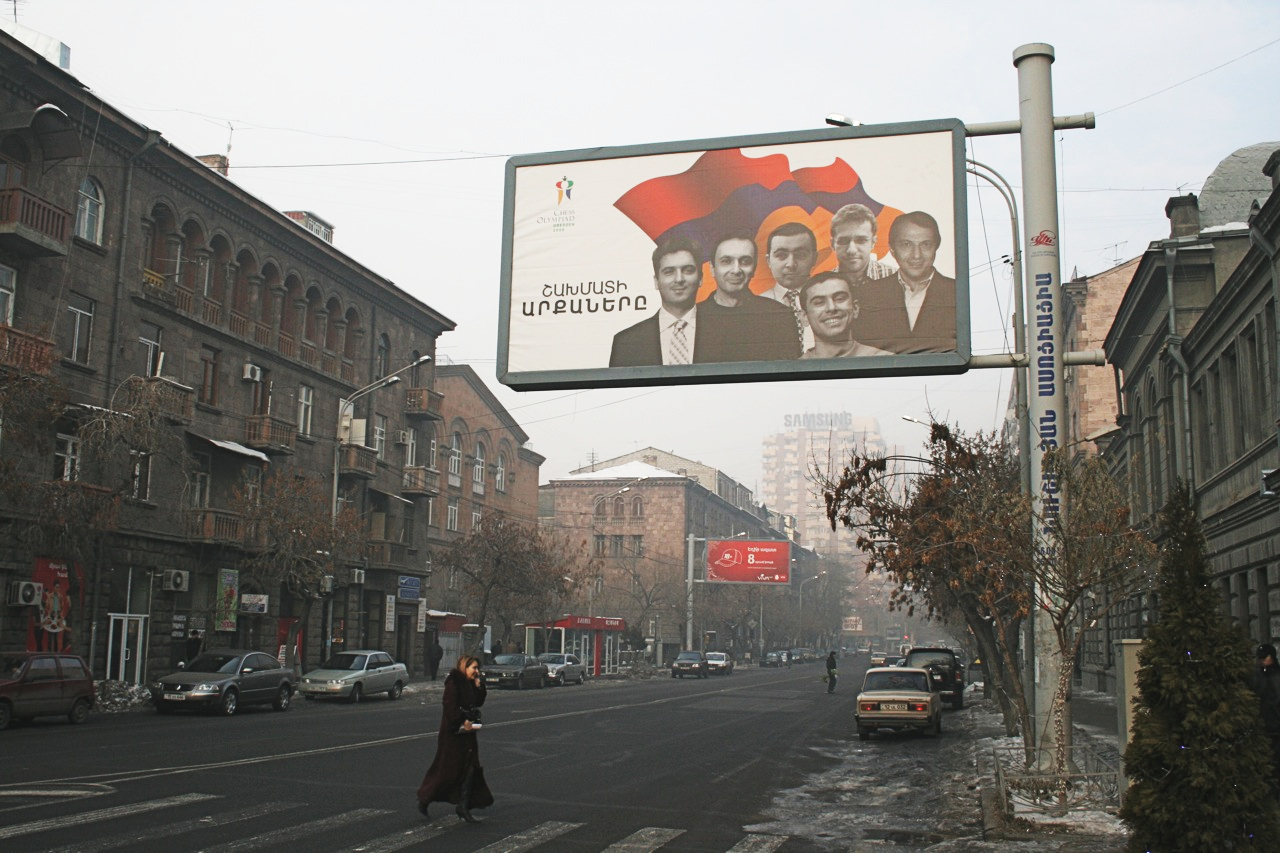
A billboard in central Yerevan celebrating Armenia's victory at the 38th Chess Olympiad. It shows members of the Armenian team with the caption "The Kings of Chess".

Armenia earned its first medal at the 1992 Chess Olympiad, finishing third. Armenia won bronze medals at the 2002 and 2004 Olympiads as well. The Armenian team made a breakthrough with the sensational victory at the 2006 Chess Olympiad. They also won the 2008 and 2012 Chess Olympiads. Their record at the World Team Championships has been similarly outstanding, finishing third in 1997, 2001, and 2005, and winning in 2011. At the European championships the team performed somewhat more poorly, placing third in 1997, first in 1999, and second in 2007.

==== Chess in schools ====
In 2011, the Ministry of Education of Armenia made chess part of the primary school curriculum along with such standards as math and history for children over the age of 6. Chess is compulsory for second, third and fourth graders. Over $1.5 million was spent on the program. The inclusion of chess in schools was generally received positively by the public, but some parents claimed that their children's school program was already complicated and overloaded. Grandmaster Smbat Lputian argued that "bringing chess into schools is the best way to build the future." Grandmaster Rafael Vaganian criticized the program as "farce."

The decision was widely reported in the international media. Journalists, chess experts and officials in various countries praised the program and advised its adoption in their respective countries. During his visit to Armenia in 2014 Magnus Carlsen stated: "I think Armenia's experience of teaching chess in schools is a great example for the whole world." As of 2020, chess is taught in grades 2 to 4 with two classes a week.

Chess players in Armenia
Year	Number
2005	1,846
2010	2,893
2021	4,969

==== Recent developments ====
On December 12, 2019 the United Nations (UN) designated 20 July as World Chess Day as proposed by the Armenian delegation. It marks the date in 1924 when the International Chess Federation was established.

As of 2021, Armenia's statistics agency recorded 4,969 chess players (including 1,318 females), up from 1,846 (375 females) in 2005 and 184 coaches (including 36 females) up from 87 (17 females) in 2005.

In August 2022, when he met with the men's team that won a silver medal at the 44th Chess Olympiad, Armenia's Prime Minister Nikol Pashinyan said Armenia should aim to win the World Chess Championship by 2050. His government has listed it as a strategic goal for Armenia.

At the FIDE 100 Awards in September 2024, Armenia was honored as the "Best Male Team".

== Armenian diaspora ==
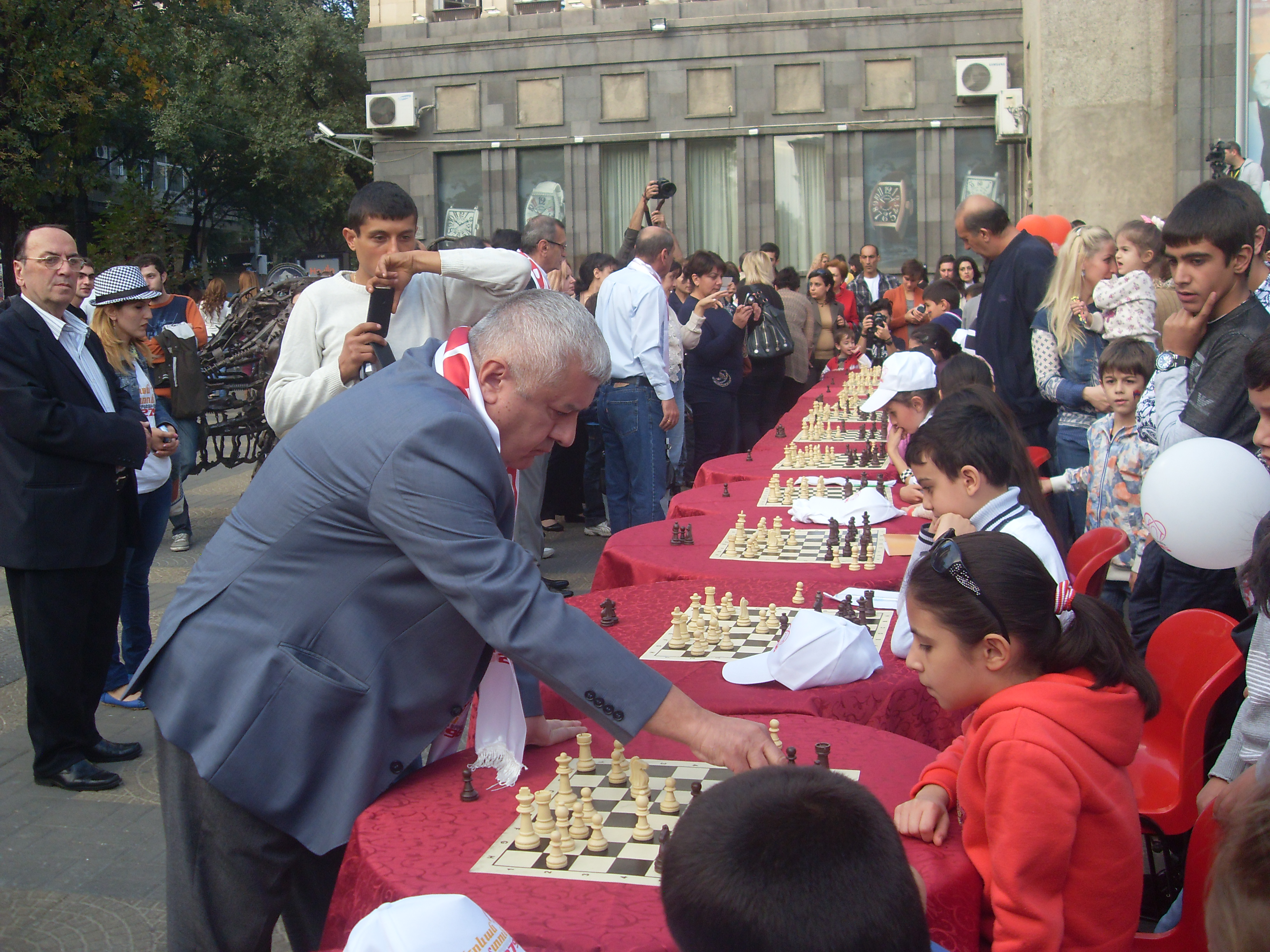
GM Rafael Vaganian, who resides in Germany, performing a simultaneous exhibition in Yerevan in 2013.

A number of ethnic Armenian chess players have achieved success outside of Armenia. Most notably, in 1985, Garry Kasparov, born in Baku, Soviet Azerbaijan to an Armenian mother and Russian Jewish father, became World Champion. Although he never represented Armenia and is only half-Armenian, some sources preferred to call him Armenian, partly because his last name is the Russified form of his mother's Armenian last name Kasparyan.

Other notable Armenian diaspora chess players include Varvara Zargarian (Georgia), Sergei Movsesian (Czech Republic, Slovakia), Yury Dokhoian and David Paravyan (Russia), Levon Ashotovich Grigorian (Uzbekistan), Tatev Abrahamyan, Samuel Sevian, Varuzhan Akobian, Melikset Khachiyan and Levon Aronian (United States), Natalia Khoudgarian (Canada), José Bademian Orchanian (Uruguay), Krikor Mekhitarian (Brazil), Knarik Mouradian (Lebanon), Evgeniya Doluhanova (Ukraine).

== Institutions ==
The national governing body for chess, the Armenian Chess Federation, was founded in 1927. Serzh Sargsyan, then Defense Minister, was elected its president in 2004 and was reelected in 2011. Sargsyan "is known for enthusiastically supporting Armenian chess players." On one occasion, Sargsyan stated that "We don't want people to know Armenia just for the earthquake and the genocide. We would rather it was famous for its chess." The Armenian government provides grandmasters with salaries and perks.

The Chess Academy of Armenia (Հայաստանի շախմատի ակադեմիա) is a leading education institutions of chess in Armenia. It was founded in 2002 by the initiative of Grandmaster Smbat Lputian and supported by then-Prime Minister Andranik Margaryan. The academy has also organized international and national chess tournaments.

== National championship ==
The first Armenian championship occurred in 1934 when it was part of the Transcaucasian SFSR. Championships were held sporadically in the Armenian SSR until 1945, when they became an annual event; this practice has been continued in independent Armenia. Genrikh Kasparyan has won it the most times (10 times), followed by Ashot Anastasian (8 times), Levon Grigorian (6 times) and Artashes Minasian (6 times).

The first woman's championship also took place in 1934, but was not held again till 1939. Some of the most notable women champions include Elina Danielian (6 times), Lilit Mkrtchian (4 times) and Siranush Andriasian (3 times).

== Media ==
The logo of Chess in Armenia magazine

In 1972, the magazine Chess in Armenia (Շախմատային Հայաստան Shakhmatayin Hayastan) was founded by Gaguik Oganessian. It was published monthly until 1997, when it became a weekly magazine. In 1972, the TV show Chess-64 (originally named Chess School) started to be aired by the Public Television of Armenia. Hosted by Gaguik Oganessian, it is the "longest lived program series" in the channel's history. Another more recently created show, Chess World, is aired after the First News.

== Individual statistics ==
FIDE, the World Chess Federation, lists 24 active Armenian grandmasters, 4 woman grandmasters, 17 international masters and 4 woman international masters.

=== Men ===
The Top 10 Armenian grandmasters as of October 2024 are listed below.

#3 player in Armenia

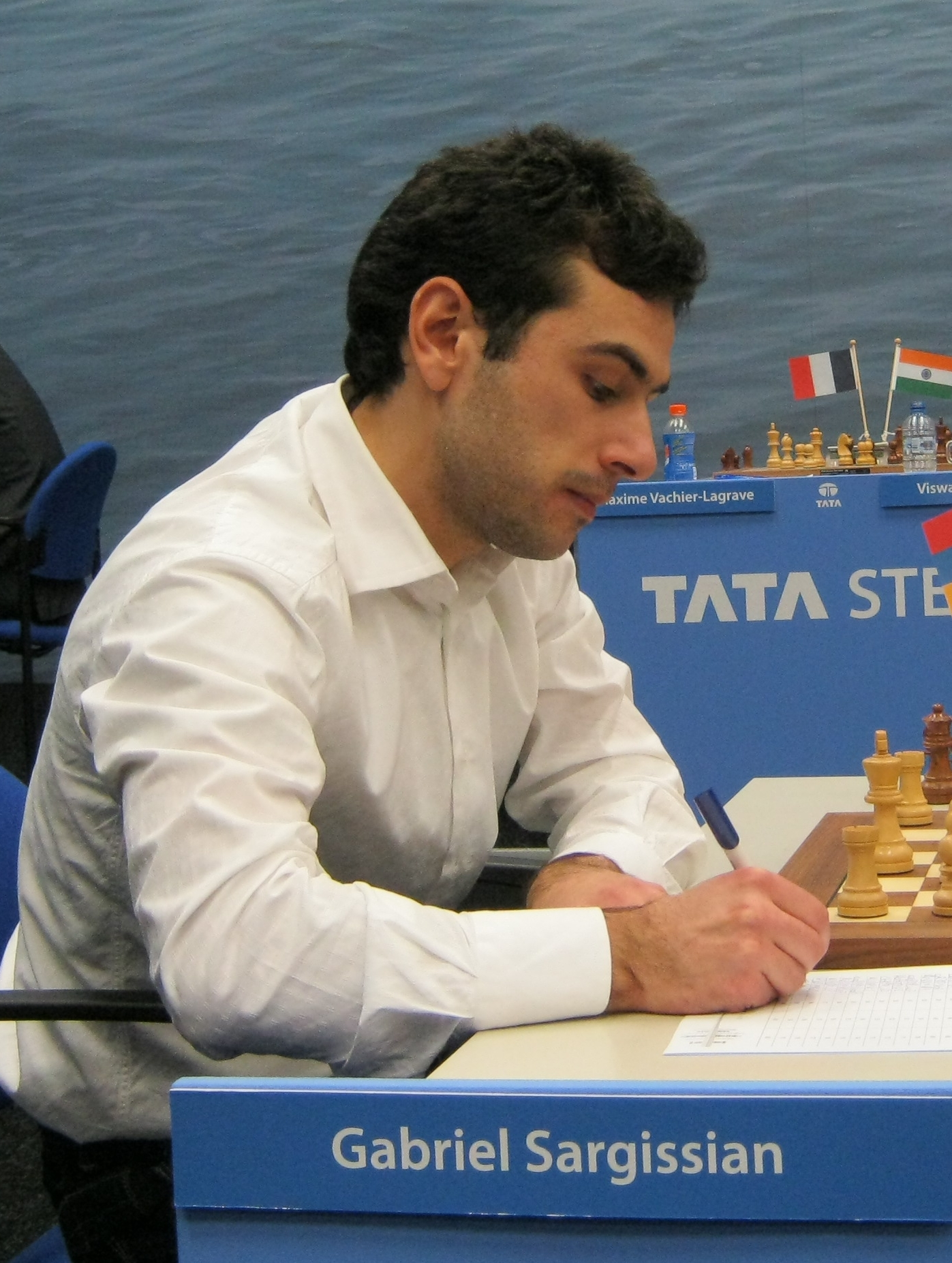
Gabriel Sargissian (#93)

#	Player	Birth year	GM Title	Rating	World rank (Note: active players only)
1	Haik M. Martirosyan	2000	2017	2676	51
2	Shant Sargsyan	2002	2019	2655	70
3	Gabriel Sargissian	1983	2002	2640	93
4	Hrant Melkumyan	1989	2008	2636	106
5	Manuel Petrosyan	1998	2017	2631	111
6	Aram Hakobyan	2001	2018	2617	135
7	Sergei Movsesian	1978	1997	2616	137
8	Robert Hovhannisyan	1991	2010	2612	144
9	Samvel Ter-Sahakyan	1993	2009	2609	148
10	Karen H. Grigoryan	1995	2013	2582	220

=== Women ===
The Top 10 women Armenian chess players are listed below as of October 2024.

#1 Armenian women player

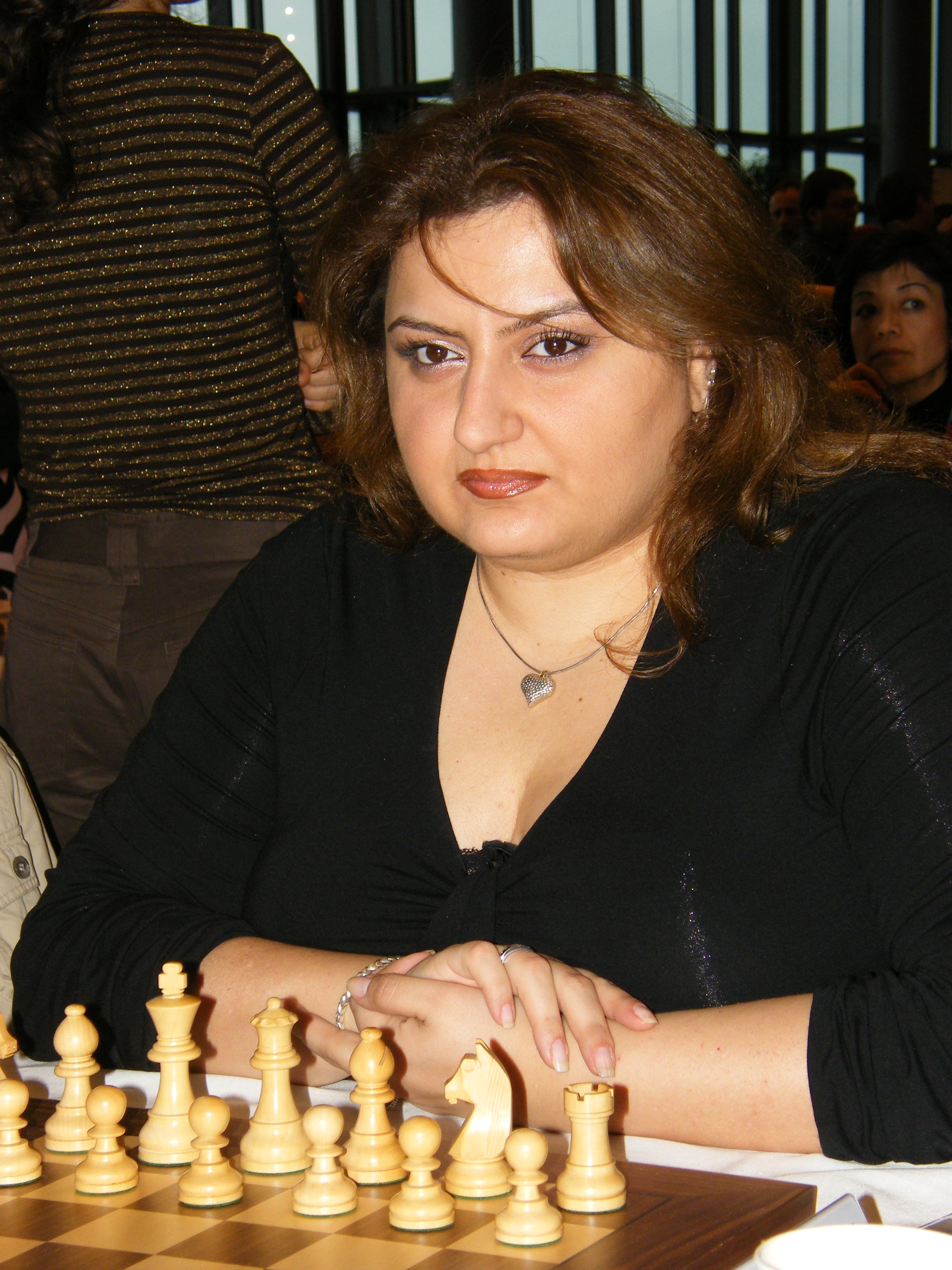
Elina Danielian (#60)

#	Player	Birth year	Title	Rating	World rank (Note: active female players only)
1	Elina Danielian	1978	GM	2391	60
2	Lilit Mkrtchian	1982	IM	2388	62
3	Anna M. Sargsyan	2001	IM	2378	69
4	Mariam Mkrtchyan	2004	WIM	2325	
5	Maria Gevorgyan	1994	WGM	2225	-
6	Susanna Gaboyan	2001	WIM	2181	-
7	Anna Khachatryan	2002	WFM	2079	-
8	Mariam Avetisyan	2000	WFM	2055	-
7	Polina Kobak	2008	WFM	2041	-
10	Ani Avetisyan	2009	-	2010	-

== Team records ==
=== Chess Olympiads ===
Open (Men's)

Year	Event	Location	Players	Position	Ref
1992	30th Chess Olympiad	Manila, Philippines	Vaganian, Akopian, Lputian, Minasian, A. Petrosian, Anastasian	3rd place, bronze medalist(s)	
1994	31st Chess Olympiad	Moscow, Russia	Vaganian, Akopian, Lputian, Anastasian, Minasian, Yegiazarian	13	
1996	32nd Chess Olympiad	Yerevan, Armenia	Akopian, Vaganian, Lputian, Minasian, Anastasian, A. Petrosian	5	
1998	33rd Chess Olympiad	Elista, Russia	Vaganian, Lputian, Akopian, Minasian, Asrian, Anastasian	16	
2000	34th Chess Olympiad	Istanbul, Turkey	Vaganian, Lputian, Minasian, Anastasian, Asrian, Sargissian	17	
2002	35th Chess Olympiad	Bled, Slovenia	Akopian, Lputian, Asrian, Sargissian, Minasian, Anastasian	3rd place, bronze medalist(s)	
2004	36th Chess Olympiad	Calviá, Spain	Akopian, Aronian, Vaganian, Lputian, Sargissian, Minasian	3rd place, bronze medalist(s)	
2006	37th Chess Olympiad	Turin, Italy	Aronian, Akopian, Asrian, Lputian, Sargissian, Minasian	1st place, gold medalist(s)	
2008	38th Chess Olympiad	Dresden, Germany	Aronian, Akopian, Sargissian, T. Petrosian, Minasian	1st place, gold medalist(s)	
2010	39th Chess Olympiad	Khanty-Mansiysk, Russia	Aronian, Akopian, Sargissian, Pashikian, Grigoryan	7	
2012	40th Chess Olympiad	Istanbul, Turkey	Aronian, Movsesian, Akopian, Sargissian, T. Petrosian	1st place, gold medalist(s)	
2014	41st Chess Olympiad	Tromsø, Norway	Aronian, Sargissian, Movsesian, Akopian, Kotanjian	8	
2016	42nd Chess Olympiad	Baku, Azerbaijan	did not participate	—	—
2018	43rd Chess Olympiad	(Georgia (country)) Batumi, Georgia	Aronian, Sargissian, Melkumyan, Hovhannisyan, Martirosyan	8	
2022	44th Chess Olympiad	Chennai, India	Sargissian, Melkumyan, Ter-Sahakyan, Petrosyan, R. Hovhannisyan	2nd place, silver medalist(s)	
2024	45th Chess Olympiad	Budapest, Hungary	Martirosyan, Sargsyan, Sargissian, Hovhannisyan, Grigoryan	6	

Women's

Year	Event	Location	Players	Position	Ref
1992	30th Chess Olympiad	Manila, Philippines	Aslanian, Khalafian, Danielian, Karakashian	33	
1994	31st Chess Olympiad	Moscow, Russia	Danielian, Aslanian, Grigorian, Airapetian	24	
1996	32nd Chess Olympiad	Yerevan, Armenia	Danielian, Hlgatian, Mkrtchian, Khalafian	20	
1998	33rd Chess Olympiad	Elista, Russia	Danielian, Hlgatian, Mkrtchian, Aginian	21	
2000	34th Chess Olympiad	Istanbul, Turkey	Danielian, Mkrtchian, Hlgatian, Aginian	10	
2002	35th Chess Olympiad	Bled, Slovenia	Danielian, Mkrtchian, Hlgatian, Galojan	15	
2004	36th Chess Olympiad	Calviá, Spain	Danielian, Mkrtchian, Aginian, Andriasian	11	
2006	37th Chess Olympiad	Turin, Italy	Mkrtchian, Danielian, Aginian, Andriasian	8	
2008	38th Chess Olympiad	Dresden, Germany	Danielian, Mkrtchian, Aginian, Galojan, Andriasian	6	
2010	39th Chess Olympiad	Khanty-Mansiysk, Russia	Danielian, Mkrtchian, Galojan, Aginian, Kharatian	11	
2012	40th Chess Olympiad	Istanbul, Turkey	Danielian, Mkrtchian, Galojan, Kursova, Hairapetian	6	
2014	41st Chess Olympiad	Tromsø, Norway	Danielian, Mkrtchian, Galojan, Kursova, Sargsyan	5	
2016	42nd Chess Olympiad	Baku, Azerbaijan	did not participate		
2018	43rd Chess Olympiad	(Georgia (country)) Batumi, Georgia	Danielian, Mkrtchian, Sargsyan, Kursova, Ghukasyan	6	
2022	44th Chess Olympiad	Chennai, India	...	12	
2024	45th Chess Olympiad	Budapest, Hungary	Mkrtchian L., Mkrtchyan M., Danielian, Sargsyan, Gaboyan	5	

=== World Team Championships ===
Men's

Year	Location	Players	Position	Ref
1993	Lucerne, Switzerland	Vaganian, Akopian, Lputian, Minasian, Anastasian, Petrosian	4	
1997	Lucerne, Switzerland	Akopian, Vaganian, Lputian, Minasian, Anastasian, Khachiyan	3rd place, bronze medalist(s)	
2001	Yerevan, Armenia	Akopian, Vaganian, Lputian, Asrian, Anastasian, Minasian	3rd place, bronze medalist(s)	
2005	Beersheba, Israel	Aronian, Akopian, Asrian, Vaganian, Lputian, Anastasian	3rd place, bronze medalist(s)	
2010	Bursa, Turkey	Aronian, Akopian, Sargissian, Pashikian, Petrosian, Kotanjian	5	
2011	Ningbo, China	Aronian, Movsesian, Akopian, Sargissian, Hovhannisyan	1st place, gold medalist(s)	
2013	Antalya, Turkey	Aronian, Movsesian, Akopian, Sargissian, Petrosian	5	
2015	Tsaghkadzor, Armenia	Aronian, Sargissian, Movsesian, Akopian, Melkumyan	3rd place, bronze medalist(s)	
2017	Khanty-Mansiysk, Russia	did not participate		
2019	Astana, Kazakhstan	did not participate		

Women's

Year	Location	Players	Position	Ref
2007	Yekaterinburg, Russia	Danielian, Mkrtchian, Aginian, Andriasian, Aghabekian	8	
2009	Ningbo, China	Danielian, Mkrtchian, Galojan, Aginian, Andriasian	5	
2011	Mardin, Turkey	Danielian, Mkrtchian, Galojan, Kursova, Aginian	6	
2013	Astana, Kazakhstan	did not participate		
2015	Chengdu, China	Danielian, Mkrtchian, Galojan, Kursova, Gaboyan	7	
2017	Khanty-Mansiysk, Russia	did not participate		
2019	Astana, Kazakhstan		8	

=== European Team Championships ===
Men's

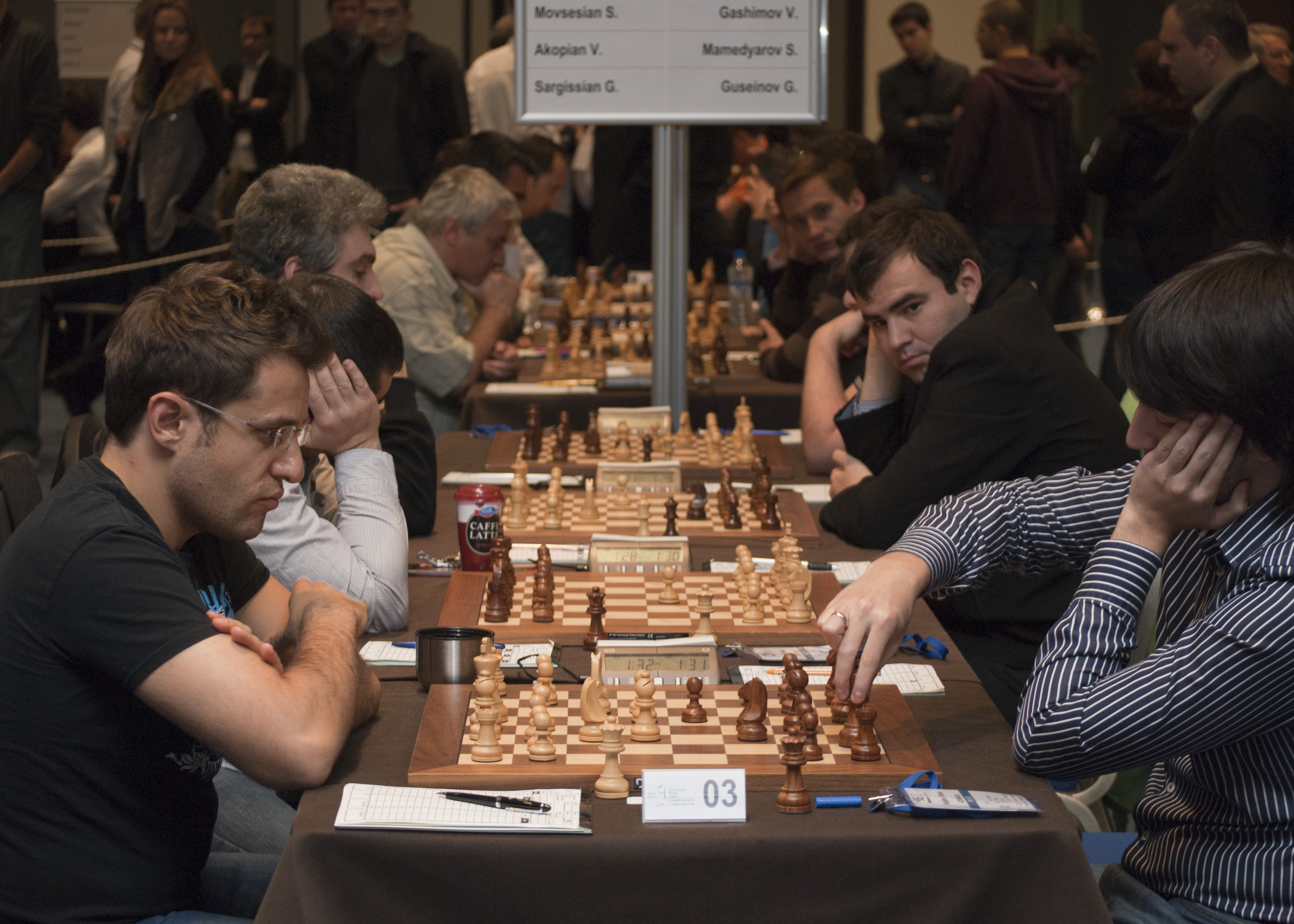
Armenia vs Azerbaijan at the 2011 European Team Chess Championship. Levon Aronian (left) and Teimour Radjabov (right) pictured in the foreground.

Year	Location	Players	Position	Ref
1992	Debrecen, Hungary	Vaganian, Akopian, Lputian, Minasian, Anastasian	19	
1997	Pula, Croatia	Akopian, Vaganian, Lputian, Minasian, Anastasian	3rd place, bronze medalist(s)	
1999	(Georgia (country)) Batumi, Georgia	Lputian, Minasian, Anastasian, Petrosian	1st place, gold medalist(s)	
2001	León, Spain	did not participate		
2003	Plovdiv, Bulgaria	did not participate		
2005	Gothenburg, Sweden	Akopian, Aronian, Vaganian, Lputian, Anastasian	12	
2007	Heraklion, Greece	Aronian, Akopian, Sargissian, Asrian, Lputian	2nd place, silver medalist(s)	
2009	Novi Sad, Serbia	Aronian, Akopian, Sargissian, Pashikian, Petrosian	4	
2011	Porto Carras, Greece	Aronian, Movsesian, Akopian, Sargissian, Hovhannisyan	4	
2013	Warsaw, Poland	Aronian, Movsesian, Akopian, Sargissian, Petrosian	4	
2015	Reykjavík, Iceland	Aronian, Sargissian, Movsesian, Melkumyan, Grigoryan	2nd place, silver medalist(s)	
2017	Halkidiki, Greece			

Women's

Year	Location	Players	Position	Ref
1992	Debrecen, Hungary	Aslanian, Hlgatian, Grigorian	19	
1997	Pula, Croatia	Danielian, Hlgatian, Mkrtchian	5	
1999	(Georgia (country)) Batumi, Georgia	Danielian, Mkrtchian, Hlgatian	5	
2001	León, Spain	did not participate		
2003	Plovdiv, Bulgaria	Danielian, Mkrtchian, Aginian	1st place, gold medalist(s)	
2005	Gothenburg, Sweden	Danielian, Mkrtchian, Aginian, Andriasian, Galojan	6	
2007	Heraklion, Greece	Danielian, Mkrtchian, Aginian, Andriasian, Aghabekian	3rd place, bronze medalist(s)	
2009	Novi Sad, Serbia	Danielian, Mkrtchian, Galojan, Aginian, Andriasian	5	
2011	Porto Carras, Greece	Danielian, Mkrtchian, Galojan, Kursova, Aginian	7	
2013	Warsaw, Poland	Danielian, Mkrtchian, Galojan, Kursova, Hairapetian	5	

=== Club championships ===
In 1995, the Yerevan city club won the European Chess Club Cup men's tournament. In 2006, the Yerevan MIKA club won the European Club Cup women's tournament.

== See also ==
- Armenian Chess Championship
- Armenian draughts
- Chess Federation of Armenia
- List of Armenian chess players
- Tigran Petrosian Chess House
