= Aghabekian =

Aghabekian is a surname. Notable people with the surname include:

- Liana Aghabekian (born 1986), Armenian and Luxembourgian chess master
- Varsen Aghabekian (born 1958), Palestinian politician and academic
