= Tigran L. Petrosian =

Armenian chess grandmaster (born 1984)

Personal information
- Born: Tigran Levoni Petrosian; 17 September 1984 (age 42) Yerevan, Armenian SSR, Soviet Union

Chess career
- Country: Armenia
- Title: Grandmaster (2004)
- FIDE rating: 2513 (November 2026)
- Peak rating: 2671 (March 2015)
- Peak ranking: No. 71 (March 2015)

Tigran Levoni Petrosian (Armenian: Տիգրան Լևոնի Պետրոսյան; born 17 September 1984) is an Armenian chess grandmaster. A two-time national champion, he competed in two Chess Olympiads, winning team gold in 2008 and 2012.

== Early years ==
Tigran L. Petrosian was born on 17 September 1984. His first name was deliberately chosen by his father to match the name of Tigran V. Petrosian (no relation), the first Armenian to become World Champion. When the late Tigran won the world title, Tigran's father dreamt that if he ever had a son he would call him Tigran. The former world champion died a month before Tigran L. Petrosian was born.

Petrosian learned chess at the age of five. He received coaching from Gagik Sargissian and Melikset Khachiyan before entering a chess academy in 2002, where he was occasionally instructed by GM Arsen Yegiazarian and IM Ashot Nadanian.

== Chess career ==
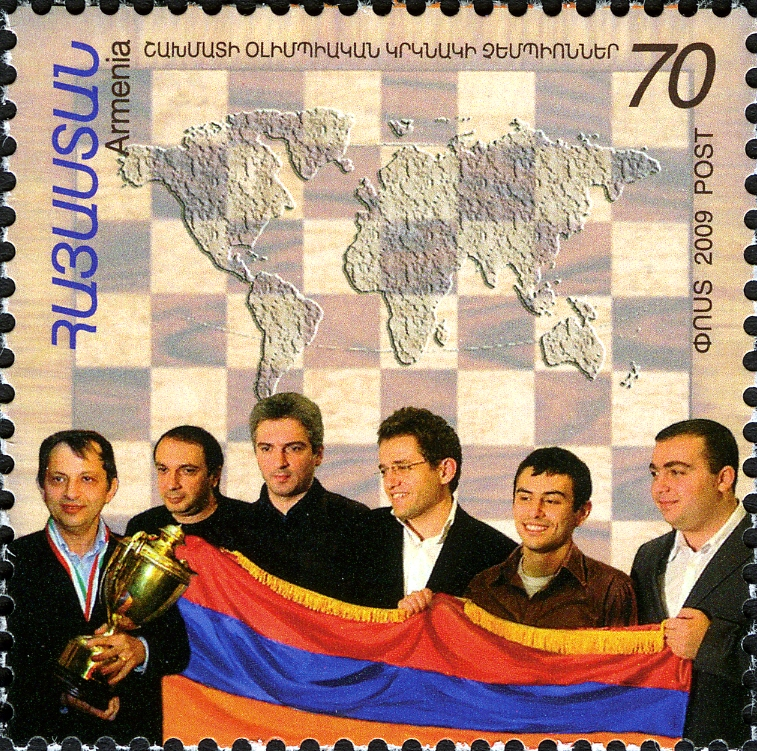
Tigran L. Petrosian (1st right) with his 2008 Olympiad teammates on a 2009 stamp of Armenia

Petrosian achieved his grandmaster title by scoring norms at the under 18 World Championship in 2002, the Batumi Open in 2003, and the Aeroflot Open in Moscow in 2004. In the same year he tied for 2nd-3rd with Zhao Jun in the World Junior Chess Championship in Kochi, India. In 2005, he tied for first in Tehran, Kish and Lausanne; in 2006 tied for first in Lyon and Dubai; in 2008 tied for first in Wheeling, Illinois and Las Vegas. In the same year he won a team gold medal (together with Levon Aronian, Vladimir Akopian, Gabriel Sargissian and Artashes Minasian) at the 38th Chess Olympiad in Dresden.

In 2011, Petrosian tied for 1st–3rd with Marat Dzhumaev and Anton Filippov in the Georgy Agzamov Memorial in Tashkent and won the event on tie-break. In the same year he won the first Armenian Chess960 Championship, tied for 2nd–4th with Abhijeet Gupta and Magesh Panchanathan in the third Orissa International GM Open Chess Tournament and came first in the 31st Villa de Benasque Open.

In January 2012, Petrosian won the Armenian Chess Championship and in February 2012 came first in the Armenian Rapid Championship.

In January 2013, Petrosian won the Armenian Chess Championship for the second time. He also won clear first prize in International "Grand Europe Open Albena-2013" in Bulgaria.

In 2017 Petrosian finished clear first in the 45th Annual World Open at Philadelphia and seventh in the World Blitz championship

In February 2018, Petrosian competed in the Aeroflot Open. He finished fifth out of ninety-two, scoring 6/9 (+3–0=6).

Petrosian plays on the Internet Chess Club (ICC) under the pseudonym "Tigrano".

== Cheating disqualification ==
On 1 October 2020, Wesley So, the eighth highest-rated grandmaster in the world at the time, accused Petrosian of cheating in his semi-final and final games during the online Chess.com 2020 PRO Chess League. Petrosian responded to So with a long, insulting message on the Chess.com forum, including the comments, "You are a biggest looser i ever seen in my life ! You was doing PIPI in your pampers when i was beating players much more stronger then you! [sic]". Chess.com subsequently determined that Petrosian had violated fair play regulations; consequently, his team, the Armenia Eagles, were disqualified and So's Saint Louis Arch Bishops were crowned champions. Chess.com and the PRO Chess League both issued lifetime bans to Petrosian.

== Awards ==
In December 2009, Petrosian was awarded the title of "Honoured Master of Sport of the Republic of Armenia".
