= Concerns and controversies at the 42nd Chess Olympiad =

There were several concerns and controversies related to the 42nd Chess Olympiad, which took place in Baku, Azerbaijan, from 1 to 14 September 2016.

== Before the Olympiad ==
=== Anti-cheating measures ===
Mindful particularly of the cheating incident of Sébastien Feller at the 39th Chess Olympiad (2010), combined with the general increase of cheating incidents, the World Chess Federation (FIDE) strove to have greatly enhanced security in Baku. Some of these were already introduced at the Chess World Cup 2015 (also in Baku), which included transmission delay of (some) games, random security checks of players, ban for bringing pens and watches into the playing hall and installation of electronic checkpoints for players at the entrance of the playing hall (see below).

In an interview during the preparations (May) for the Olympiad, Israel Gelfer (the Chairman of FIDE's Anti-cheating Committee) said that the issue of anti-cheating became important in the last couple of years, with the development of telecommunication technologies (mobile phones, watches and even glasses) that have caused a problem which cannot be ignored. Gelfer explained that they are trying to balance between their will to fight against cheaters and at the same time not to create an unhealthy atmosphere in the chess world. The usual electronic scans before and after the game were of course prescribed, while novel procedures included: having a special anti-cheating arbiter (Klaus Deventer) with approximately 15 arbiters under his authority, one of whose charges was to carry out 30-40 checks during the round; and that players MUST inform their Match Arbiter when leaving the playing area. Both of these later came into difficulties with their implementation (see below).

=== Visas ===
Due to a small number of embassies, Azerbaijan can be more difficult to obtain a visa for when compared to other countries which have hosted the Olympiad. This issue was briefly raised during the 83rd FIDE Congress, and Azad Rahimov noted the country had a positive experience with the Eurovision Song Contest 2012, where all participants could receive a visa on arrival at the airport without any problem. In a similar manner, in April 2016, the President of Azerbaijan Ilham Aliyev signed an order on simplifying the visa procedures for travellers to Azerbaijan in connection with the Chess Olympiad, allowing them to get visas in the country's international airports.

In the end, it was unclear whether any non-attendees (see below) were absent for specifically this reason.

=== Armenian withdrawal ===
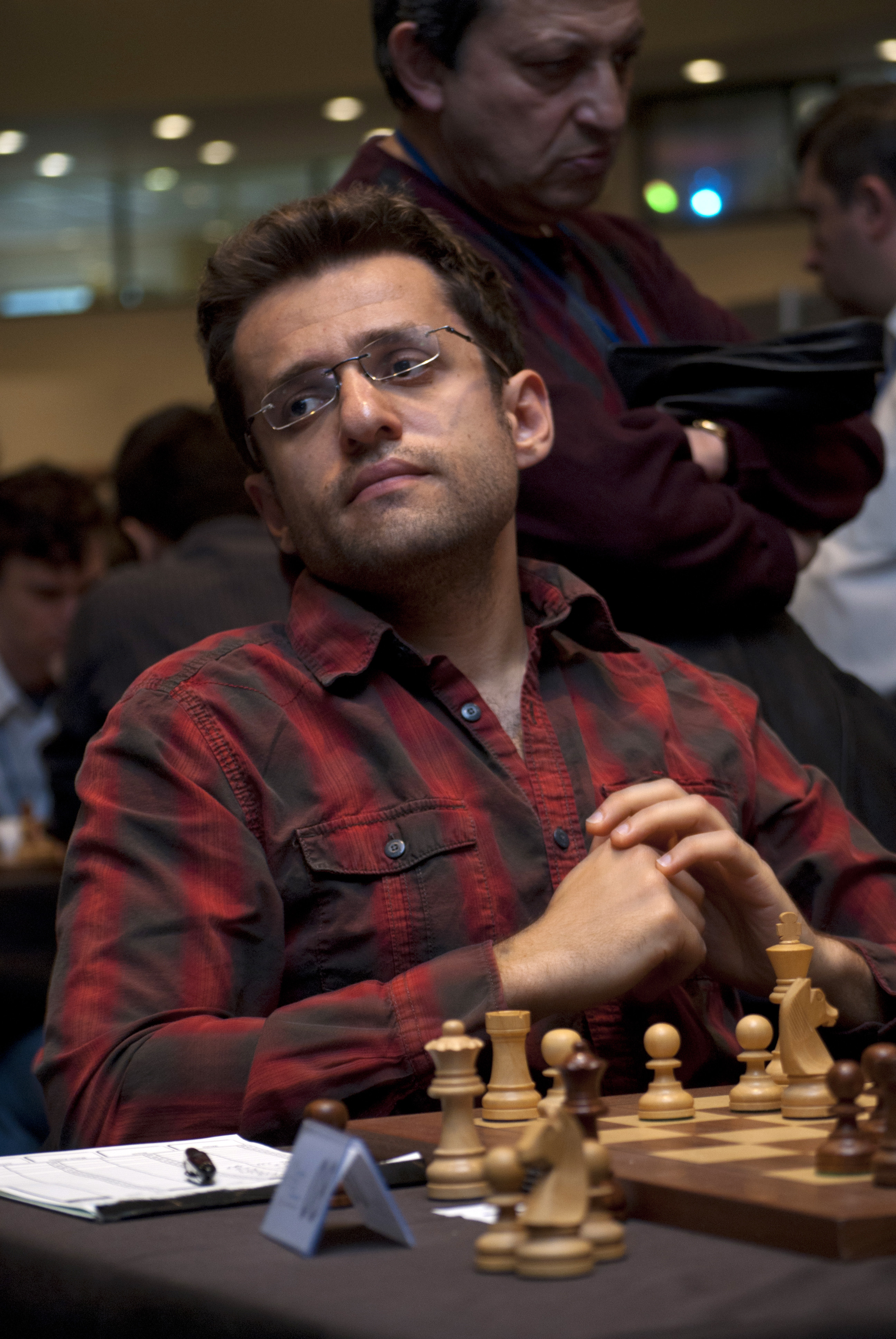
Levon Aronian missed the Olympiad as Armenia chose not to participate

Armenia's participation in a Chess Olympiad hosted in Azerbaijan was raised as a concern at the 83rd FIDE Congress in Istanbul in 2012 during discussions about Baku's nomination to host the Olympiad in 2016, with the Armenian representative protesting since Armenian chess players would find it quite difficult to play in Baku.

Historically this is nothing new, as the tense relations between Armenia and Azerbaijan because of the Nagorno-Karabakh conflict have been mirrored in chess over the years, resulting in the absence of players from one of the two countries at tournaments hosted in the other country and even relocation of chess events. For example, the candidates tournament for the World Chess Championship 2012 was ultimately moved (completely) from Baku to Kazan, with consideration given that one underlying reason was because Armenia's Levon Aronian was inhospitable toward playing in Azerbaijan. More recently, Azerbaijan chose not to play in the 2015 World Team Chess Championship in Tsaghkadzor, and Azerbaijani players did not participate in the European Individual Chess Championship 2014 in Yerevan. Nevertheless, Armenian players, including Levon Aronian, did play at the 2015 Chess World Cup in Baku, giving some hope the team would appear at the Olympiad.

In May 2016, during his visit to Yerevan, FIDE President Kirsan Ilyumzhinov said that, after talking to the Armenian Chess Federation chairman Serzh Sargsyan (also President of Armenia), he heard no refusal about their participation. The vice-president of the Armenian Chess Federation Smbat Lputian responded that Armenia was still discussing the matter and had not decided on the matter yet. In July 2016, Lputian announced that (based upon discussion within the federation) the Armenian chess team would not participate in the Chess Olympiad.

=== Other federation difficulties ===
==== Pakistan ====
One week before the Olympiad started, the Pakistani Sports Board, dealing with three separate claimants to status of official national federation, refused to issue "No Objection Certificates" (NOCs). A spokesman said, "we have refused to issue NOCs to around 15 men and women chess players and two officials as currently no chess federation is recognised by us. Issuing them NOCs will mean we’ve accepted an illegal body.” In the end, a team from Pakistan (with its top players) did attend and finished slightly above average.

==== Kenya ====
Kenya has had a long running dispute within its federation, and due to this and other reasons (see below) the open team ended up not showing up for the event and the women's team began play only in round 5.

=== Other non-attendees ===
==== Israel ====
Israel participated without Boris Gelfand, Emil Sutovsky, and Ilya Smirin due to a dispute with the Israel Chess Federation management. The hardships were already evident in 2015, when the country failed to send a team at the European Team Chess Championship due to monetary difficulties. Boris Gelfand, who played on board one for Israel at nine consecutive Olympiads (1998-2014), said the management of the Israel Chess Federation have "absolutely forgotten about such things as the prestige of the country". Emil Sutovsky claimed on his Facebook page that the dispute was about "showing who’s boss rather than money".

==== Bulgaria ====
Bulgaria played without Ivan Cheparinov and Kiril Georgiev, the former due to monetary disputes, and the latter because the Bulgarian Chess Federation considered him banned. Moreover, Veselin Topalov left midway through the event to attend to his pregnant wife. At one point, the entire Bulgarian team was rumored not to be coming (similarly they were absent from the 2015 European Team Chess Championship), as was Greece.

==== Individuals ====
Other than the above, the most prominent individual not participating was Viswanathan Anand, who has not represented India since 2006. Vassily Ivanchuk from Ukraine was absent for the first time since 1988, choosing to play in a draughts tournament instead.

== During the Olympiad ==
=== African nations ===
A number of African nations did not show up in time, for various reasons such as difficulties flying through Istanbul, and finalisation of monetary arrangements (teams must pay first, and then get reimbursed later). In the end, 10 African nations did not arrive (Kenya, Cameroon, Mali, Rwanda, Sierra Leone, Burundi, Liberia, Seychelles, Senegal, Central African Republic).

=== Lack of security measures ===
Despite the aforementioned anti-cheating protocols, some participants felt that this was merely a display without effect. Mobile phones were commonly heard going off, particularly in the entourage of FIDE President Kirsan Ilyumzhinov. It was also regarded as fairly easy to circumvent the initial metal detectors simply by passing an object around them.

=== Complaints on anti-cheating measures ===
A significant petition was circulated by Jonathan Speelman and others regarding the mandatory notification of the arbiter when leaving the playing area (the petition concentrated on toilet visits). Reasons given for this protesting against this "noxious" rule included: the FIDE rule that the toilet is part of the playing area; an indication it was "humiliating" for players to discuss bodily functions with arbiters (and embarrassing for the arbiters); a note that the Match Arbiter (the indicated person to be notified) was not always available, rendering it difficult to always comply with the rule; an argument that frequent toilet trips did not indicate cheating, and a request that players not be penalised merely for this; and an argument that the opponent might gain information from seeing a player notify the arbiter by moving as soon as they left for the bathroom visit. The response by Chief Arbiter Faiq Hasanov noted only that the third complaint was legitimate, and that "common sense" should apply.

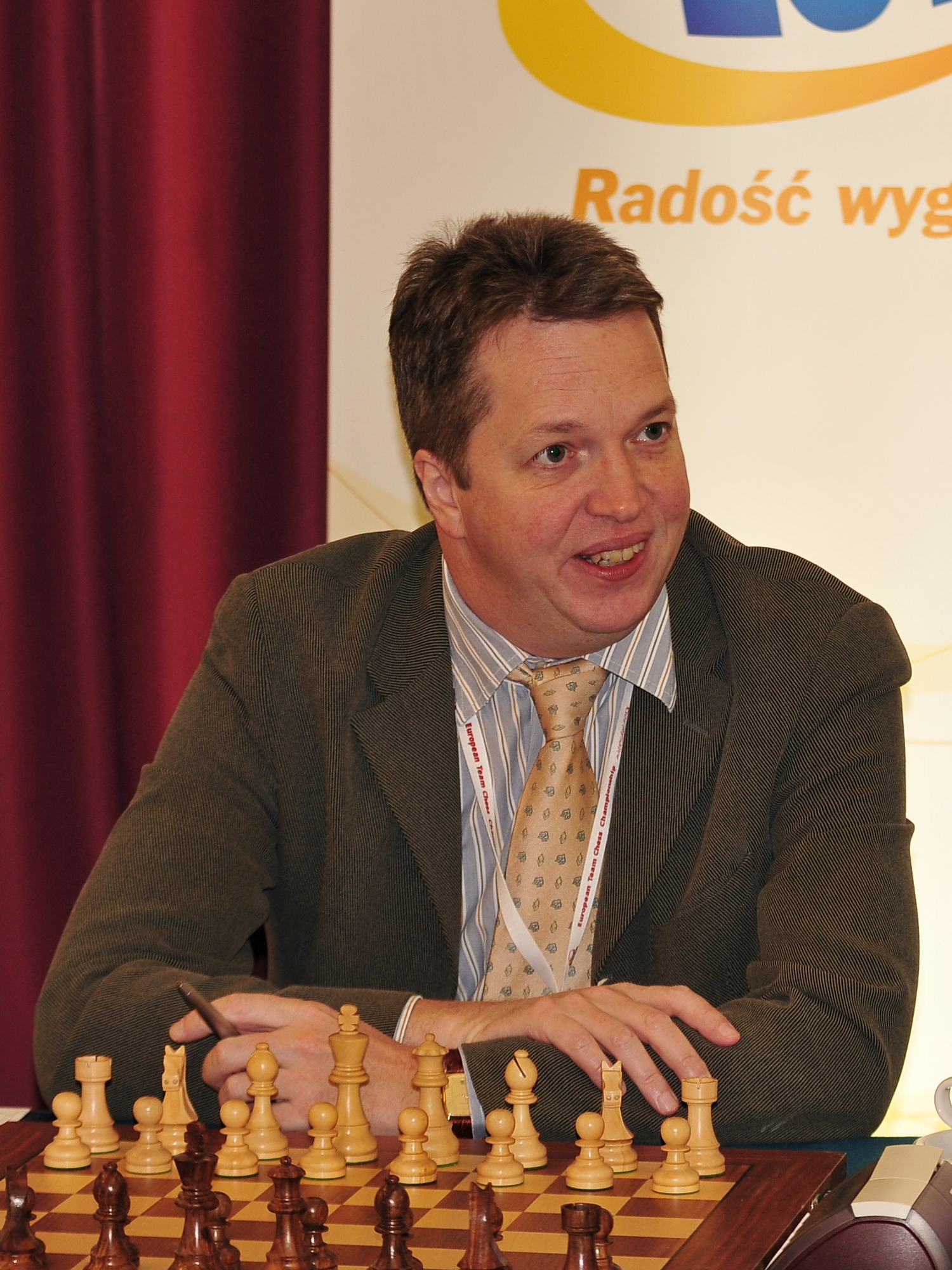
Nigel Short received official warning for refusing to undergo a check during a game

During the game of the seventh round between Nigel Short and Li Chao, the former was returning from the toilet with about 30 minutes to make 20 moves when an anti-cheating arbiter asked him to undergo a spot check with a hand scanner for electronic devices. Short did not heed the request, and sat back down to play. After the game, Klaus Deventer (the head of the anti-cheating arbiters) reprimanded Short with a warning. Short discussed the event extensively after the event, indicating that he did not think the cost of annoyance to the player (even when returning from outside the playing area) was comparable to the anti-cheating benefit, though he was not pressed specifically regarding cases where a culprit has in fact been disqualified following mid-game requests for inspection (some for refusal, others for being caught with a device). Initially Short also mentioned the fact he and the arbiter in question (Jamie Kenmure, an Australian who is FIDE delegate for the Solomon Islands) have a political past, and thus Short did not trust that his being selected for the test actually originated from Deventer (as per the regulations). Alternative initial reports dramatised the event to have the arbiters "ask[ing] him to step away from the board and subject himself to a full search" while in time trouble and playing a "do-or-die" position, though these details now seem discredited.

Multiple post-event comments by captains and players continued to report the annoyance of the anti-cheating measures, noting that a better balance between security and enjoyment could be found by FIDE. Baadur Jobava was prominent on the other side of the issue, opining that the anti-cheating measures would help solve the non-stop screaming about this great "headache" for the 21st century chess player.

=== Japanese player forfeited ===
In the fourth round, a Japanese player (Tang Tang) was forfeited after he was caught with an electronic device in a random check conducted prior to leaving the venue. The game result was reversed from a win for the player to a loss, which also resulted in a change in the match score. Chief Arbiter Faiq Hasanov said that he was approached by an arbiter in the anti-cheating department and informed about the matter. He himself did not bother to check if there was a chess program installed on the device, as possession already violated the rules, leading to an automatic forfeiture. Later information from other arbiters involved indicated there possibly were two devices involved, and their quick check did not indicate a chess program was running. Without sufficient evidence of cheating per se, Hasanov felt that more than game disqualification would be double punishment. The captain of the Japanese team GM Mihajlo Stojanović later addressed some of the related issues in comments on the blog of the Macedonian grandmaster and general secretary of the Association of Chess Professionals Aleksandar Čolooviḱ.
