= Arusyak =

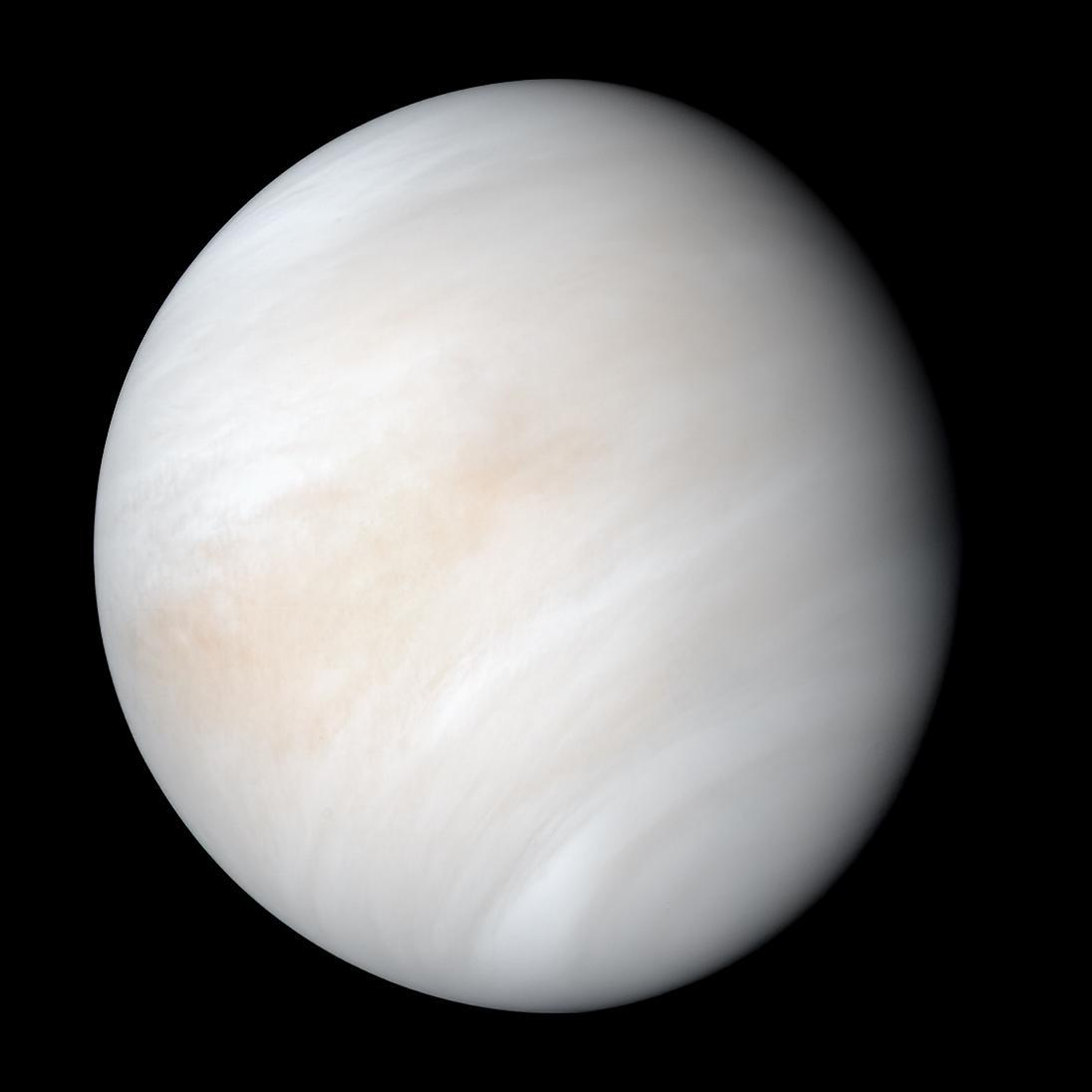

Arusyak, Arousyak, Arusiak (Armenian: Արուսյակ is an Armenian feminine given name literallly meaning "Venus". Notable people with the name include:

- Arusiak Grigorian – Armenian chess player
- Arusyak Grigoryan – Armenian woman sports shooter
- Arousyak Papazian – Ottoman Armenian actress (1841–1907)
