= Karen Asrian =

Armenian chess grandmaster (1980–2008)

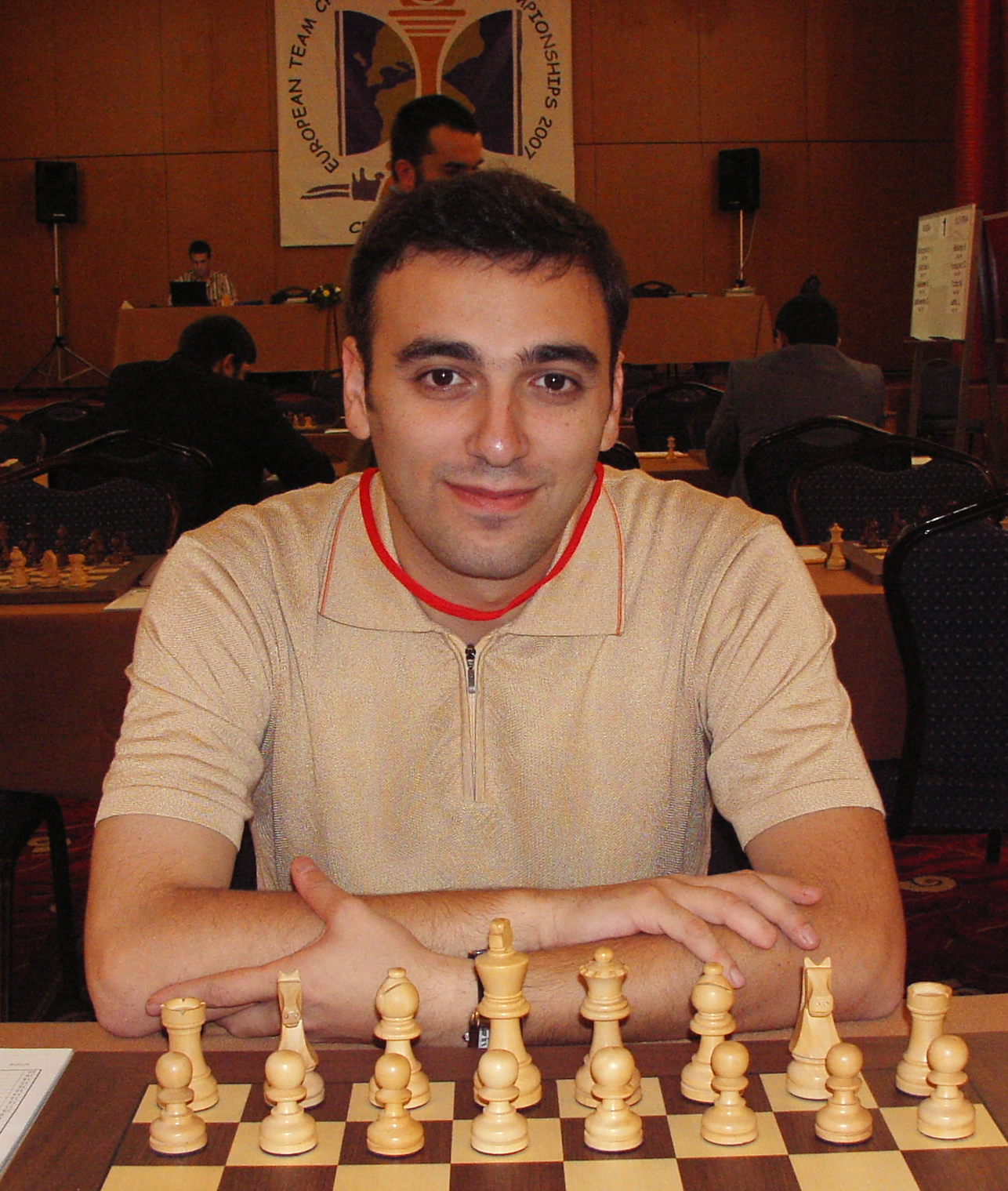
- Asrian at EuroChess 2007

Personal information
- Born: 24 April 1980 Yerevan, USSR
- Died: 9 June 2008 (aged 28) Yerevan, Armenia

Chess career
- Country: Armenia
- Title: Grandmaster (1998)
- Peak rating: 2646 (January 2006)
- Peak ranking: No. 61 (October 2005)

Karen Asrian (Armenian: Կարեն Ասրյան; 24 April 1980 – 9 June 2008) was an Armenian chess player. Awarded the title of Grandmaster by FIDE in 1998, he was a three-time Armenian champion. Asrian was a member of the gold medal-winning Armenian team in the 37th Chess Olympiad.

== Career ==
Asrian started playing chess in 1985, became an international master in 1997 and a grandmaster in 1998. He graduated from the Armenian State Institute of Physical Culture and Sport in 2001.

He won the Armenian Chess Championship in 1999, 2007, and 2008, and the Dubai 2001 and 2004 Tigran Petrosian Memorial tournaments. In 2006, Asrian competed on third board for the gold medal-winning Armenian team at the Chess Olympiad in Turin.

In Armenia he became team champion in 2006 and 2007 with Bank King Yerevan. In Russia he played for South Ural Chelyabinsk in 2006 and 2007 and for the Chess Federation of Moscow in 2008. In the French first division, the Top 16, he played for Bischwiller in 2006–07 and 2007–08.

On 9 June 2008 the Chess Federation of Armenia reported that Asrian had died of a suspected heart attack while driving, which was confirmed the following day. His final Elo rating, in April 2008, was 2630.

== Tournament records ==
- 2003 4th European Individual Chess Championship 8/13
- 2004 3rd Aeroflot Open 5.5/9
- 2004 Petrosian Memorial Tournament 6/9
- 2004 6th Dubai Open 5/9
- 2004 5th European Individual Chess Championship 8/13
- 2005 65th Armenian Championship 7/11
- 2005 4th Aeroflot Open 5.5/9
- 2005 Karabakh International 4/9
- 2005 6th European Individual Chess Championship 9/13
- 2006 66th Armenian Championship 5.5/9
- 2006 5th Aeroflot Open 5.5/9
- 2006 37th Chess Olympiad 5/10
- 2007 67th Armenian Championship 9.5/13
- 2007 6th Aeroflot Open 5.5/9
- 2007 7th European Individual Chess Championship 6/11
- 2008 68th Armenian Championship 8/13
- 2008 Moscow Open 6/9
- 2008 7th Aeroflot Open 5.5/9
- 2008 8th European Individual Chess Championship 6.5/11

== Death ==
On 9 June 2008, the Chess Federation of Armenia reported that Asrian had died of a heart attack while driving. Asrian, feeling ill, pulled his car into a courtyard in the Armenian capital of Yerevan on an early Monday and then lost consciousness. An ambulance crew pronounced him dead at the scene, possibly of a heart attack. A moment of silence was held in his memory before the opening of a speed-chess tournament in Yerevan on Monday, after his death was announced by Armenian chess player Smbat Lputian.

Asrian received an open casket funeral on 11 June in the Tigran Petrosian Chess House. President of Armenia and the Armenian Chess Federation Serzh Sargsyan, Prime Minister of Armenia Tigran Sargsyan, Chairman of Parliament of Armenia Tigran Torosyan, participants of the GM tournament held in Yerevan, and thousands of chess lovers were present at the funeral service.

He was supposed to take part in the Iranian Chess Premier League, which took place shortly after his death. Before the arbiters started the clocks in the first round on Thursday 12 June, there was a minute's silence in honour of Grandmaster Karen Asrian's memory. Ehsan Ghaem Maghami, the leading chess player in Iran and fellow club teammate of Fajr-e-Shams-e-Atieh, gave a speech before the start of the tournament and sorrowfully announced the passing of his good friend Asrian and, on behalf of the Iranian Chess Community, expressed his sincere condolences to Karen's family, friends and the entire World Chess Community.

== Legacy ==
The Chess Giants Yerevan tournament was named such up until 2008. After the sudden and tragic death of Asrian on 9 June 2008, the same day the tournament began, the Chess Federation of Armenia decided to interrupt the event for a few days, and then rename it to the Karen Asrian Memorial, which continued to be its name in the next editions. Compatriot Levon Aronian won that same first Karen Asrian Memorial on 15 June. Asrian and Aronian had both been on the 37th Chess Olympiad gold medal-winning team.

== Notable games ==
- Rustam Kasimdzhanov vs Karen Asrian, Lausanne YM Pool B 1999, Queen's Gambit Declined: Exchange, Positional Variation (D35), 0-1
- Karen Asrian vs Igor Khenkin, FIDE WCh KO 2001, Sicilian Defense: Four Knights Variation (B40), 1/2–1/2
- Karen Asrian vs Arman Pashikian, 66th Armenian Championship 2006, Spanish Game: General (C65), 1-0
- Konstantin Maslak vs Karen Asrian, 6th Aeroflot Festival 2007, French Defense: Advance Variation, Main Line (C02), 0-1
