= Armenian State Institute of Physical Culture and Sport =

Coordinates: 40.1761°N 44.5239°E

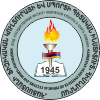
- Type: Public
- Established: 1945; 81 years ago
- Rector: Davit Khitaryan
- Students: 2320, including foreign students
- Location: Yerevan, Armenia
- Website: https://sportedu.am/?lang=en

Armenian State Institute of Physical Culture and Sport (Armenian: Հայաստանի ֆիզիկական կուլտուրայի և սպորտի պետական ինստիտուտ) is a higher educational institution institute, located in Yerevan, Armenia. It was founded in 1945 and prepares coached, sport journalists, and specialists in the field of health improving physical culture kinesiology and adaptive physical culture. The graduates are awarded a diploma, which is a state-authorized document asserting the higher education completion for state agencies.

== Faculties/department ==
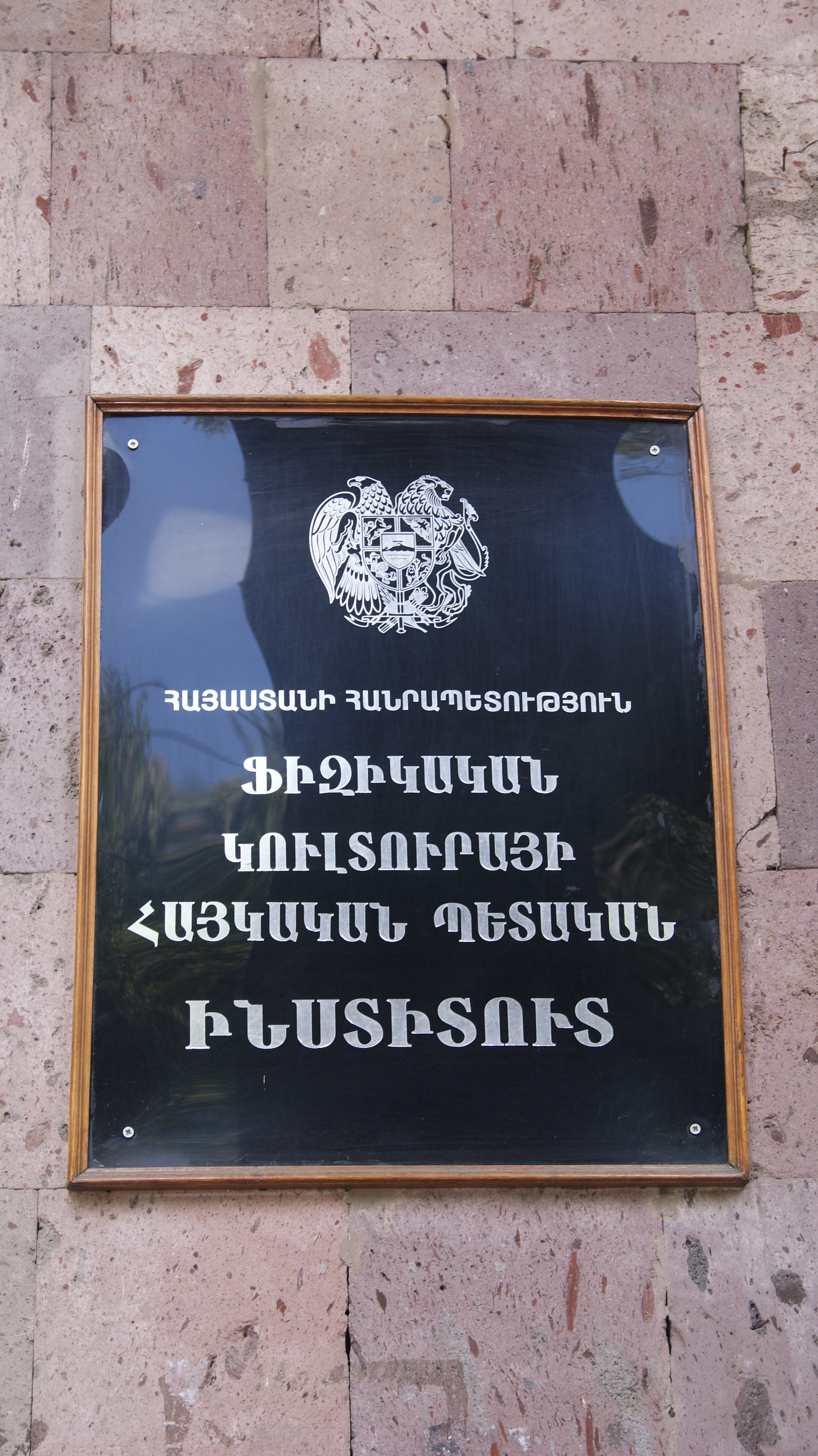

- Adaptive physical culture
- Athletics
- Basketball
- Boxing
- Chess
- Fencing
- Football
- Free-style wrestling
- Graeco-Roman wrestling
- Gymnastics
- Handball
- Heavy athletics
- Judo
- Кaratedo
- Кinesiology
- Salvage operations
- Skates and cycle racing
- Sports dances
- Sports journalism
- Sports pedagogical
- Swimming
- Table tennis
- Unarmed self-defence
- Volleyball

== Notable alumni ==
- Levon Aronian, chess Grandmaster
- Karen Asrian, chess Grandmaster and Olympic champion
- Aghvan Chatinyan, mountain climber
- Aleksandr Kabanov, Russian water polo player and coach
- Tom "Tatos" Mooradian, basketball player, journalist, and author
- Ashot Nadanian, chess International Master, theoretician and coach
- Vazgen Sargsyan, former Prime Minister of Armenia
- Gagik Tsarukyan, Armenian businessman, current head of the Armenian Olympic Committee
- Arsen Yegiazarian, chess Grandmaster and coach

== See also ==
- American University of Armenia
- Armenian State Pedagogical University
- Eurasia International University
- Russian-Armenian (Slavonic) University
- State Engineering University of Armenia
- Yerevan State University
- Yerevan State Linguistic University
- Yerevan State Medical University
- Yerevan State Musical Conservatory
