= Smbat Lputian =

Armenian chess grandmaster (born 1958)

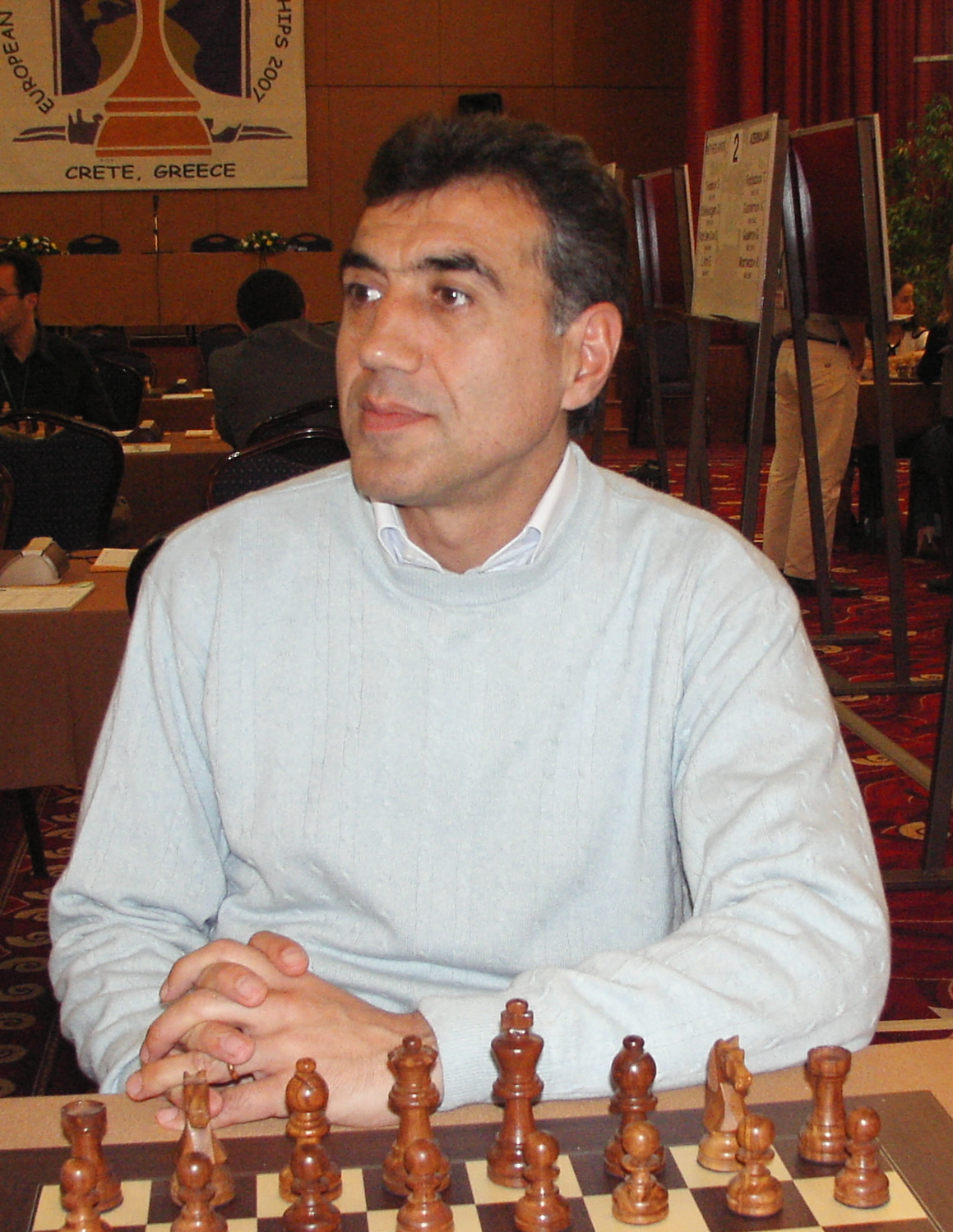
- Lputian in Heraklion, 2007

Personal information
- Born: Smbat Garegini Lputian; 14 February 1958 (age 68) Yerevan, Armenian SSR, Soviet Union

Chess career
- Country: Soviet Union → Armenia
- Title: Grandmaster (1984)
- FIDE rating: 2574 (November 2026)
- Peak rating: 2640 (January 2005)
- Peak ranking: No. 17 (January 1989)

Smbat Garegini Lputian (also transliterated as Lputyan; Armenian: Սմբատ Լպուտյան; born 14 February 1958) is an Armenian chess grandmaster.

== Chess career ==
He was first at the tournament in Berlin in 1982, shared first place at Athens and at Irkutsk in 1983, first at Sarajevo in 1985 and at Irkutsk in 1986, shared first at Hastings in 1986–87, and first at Dortmund in 1988. He won the Armenian Championship in 1978, 1980, 1998, and 2001. In 2006, he won a team gold medal (together with Levon Aronian, Vladimir Akopian, Karen Asrian, Gabriel Sargissian and Artashes Minasian) at the 37th Chess Olympiad. Smbat Lputyan has been the founder-president of Chess Academy of Armenia since 2002.

Lputian earned the International Master (IM) title in 1982 and the Grandmaster (GM) title in 1984.

In December 2009, he was awarded the title of "Honoured Master of Sport of the Republic of Armenia".

On the July 2009 FIDE list, his Elo rating is 2574. His handle on the Internet Chess Club is "SM".

== Bibliography ==
- Felice, Gino Di (25 August 2022a). Chess Results, 1981-1985: A Comprehensive Record with 1,508 Tournament Crosstables and 205 Match Scores, with Sources. McFarland. ISBN 978-1-4766-8402-4.
- Felice, Gino Di (11 October 2022b). Chess Results, 1986-1988: A Comprehensive Record with 843 Tournament Crosstables and 130 Match Scores, with Sources. McFarland. ISBN 978-1-4766-8404-8.
