= 2014 European Individual Chess Championship =

The 2014 European Individual Chess Championship took place from 2 to 15 March in Yerevan.

263 players took part. Although sometimes described as the men's championship, several women took part, including Judit Polgár and Antoaneta Stefanova. The top 23 players qualified for the Chess World Cup 2015, which took place in Baku, Azerbaijan from 10 September to 5 October 2015 and was won by Sergey Karjakin.

It was won by Alexander Motylev.

The equivalent women's event took place from 6 to 17 July 2014 in Plovdiv, Bulgaria and was won by Valentina Gunina.

== Result ==
| Place | Player | Title | Country | Result |
| 1 | Alexander Motylev | GM | Russia | 9/11 |
| 2 | David Antón Guijarro | GM | Spain | 8/11 |
| 3 | Vladimir Fedoseev | GM | Russia | 8/11 |
| 4 | Dragan Šolak | GM | Turkey | 8/11 |
| 5 | Pavel Eljanov | GM | Ukraine | 8/11 |
| 6 | Constantin Lupulescu | GM | Romania | 8/11 |
| 7 | David Navara | GM | Czech Republic | 8/11 |
| 8 | Ivan Šarić | GM | Croatia | 8/11 |
| 9 | Igor Lysyj | GM | Russia | 8/11 |
| 10 | Hrant Melkumyan | GM | Armenia | 7½/11 |
| 11 | Radosław Wojtaszek | GM | Poland | 7½/11 |
| 12 | Dmitry Jakovenko | GM | Russia | 7½/11 |
| 13 | Vladislav Artemiev | IM | Russia | 7½/11 |
| 14 | Ilya Smirin | GM | Israel | 7½/11 |
| 15 | Laurent Fressinet | GM | France | 7½/11 |
| 16 | Gabriel Sargissian | GM | Armenia | 7½/11 |
| 17 | Alexander Areshchenko | GM | Ukraine | 7½/11 |
| 18 | Miloš Perunović | GM | Serbia | 7½/11 |
| 19 | Ivan Cheparinov | GM | Bulgaria | 7½/11 |
| 20 | Viorel Iordăchescu | GM | Moldova | 7½/11 |
| 21 | Sergei Zhigalko | GM | Belarus | 7½/11 |
| 22 | Samvel Ter-Sahakyan | GM | Armenia | 7½/11 |
| 23 | Csaba Balogh | GM | Hungary | 7½/11 |
