= Arsen Yegiazarian =

Armenian chess grandmaster (1970–2020)

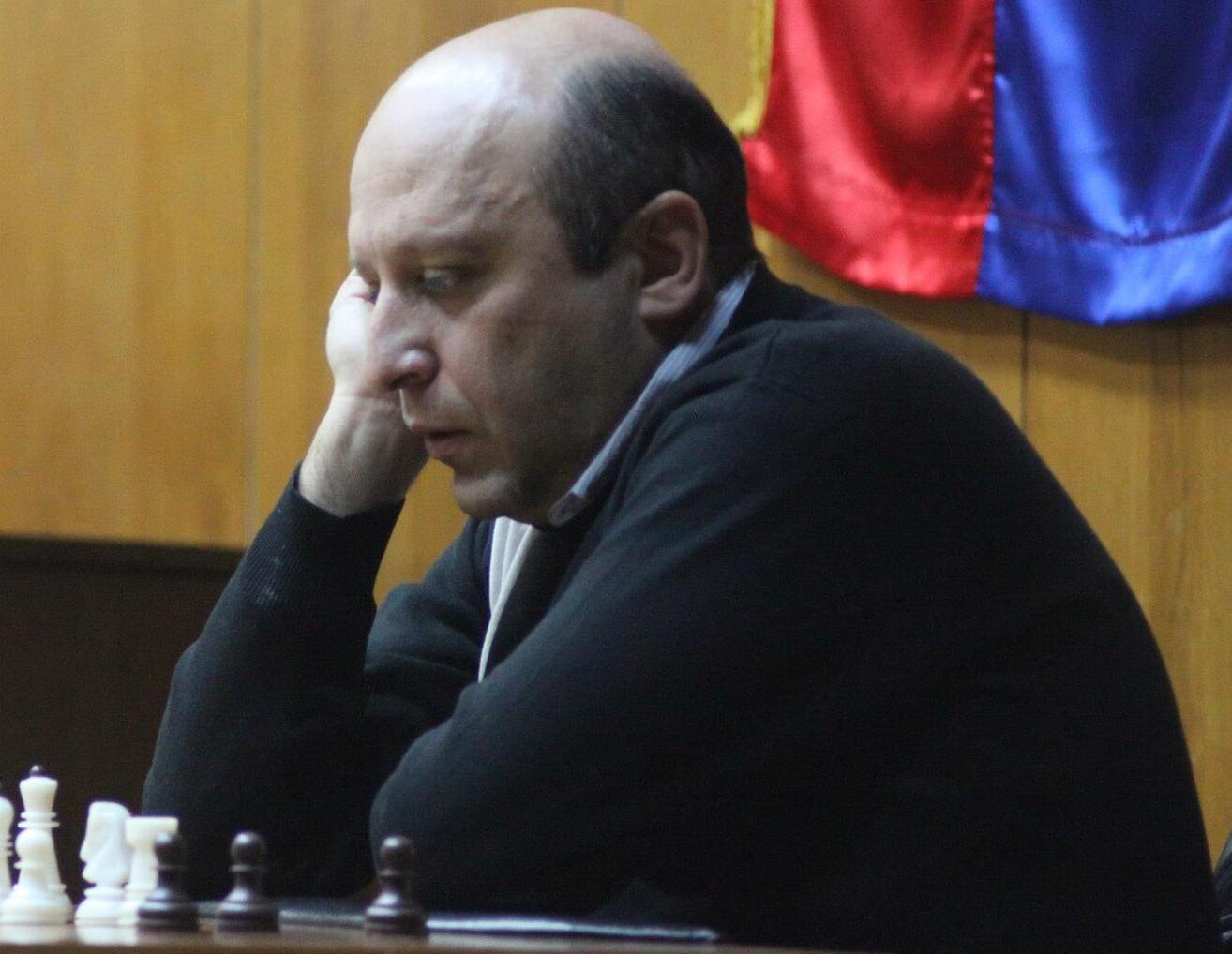
- Yegiazarian in 2013

Personal information
- Born: 18 June 1970 Yerevan, Armenian SSR
- Died: 20 April 2020 (aged 49)

Chess career
- Country: Armenia
- Title: Grandmaster (2000)
- Peak rating: 2567 (April 2002)

Arsen Yegiazarian (Armenian: Արսեն Եղիազարյան; 18 June 1970 – 20 April 2020) was an Armenian chess player who received the FIDE titles of Grandmaster (GM) in 2000 and FIDE Senior Trainer (FST) in 2011.

== Career ==
Yegiazarian graduated from the Armenian State Institute of Physical Culture in 1992. He became a Grandmaster in chess in 2000. Yegiazarian had won the Armenian Youth Championship in 1984 and 1988 in the under-18 group and came in third place at the senior Armenian Chess Championship in 1998 and 2000. The Yerevan city chess club, which included Yegiazarian, won the 1995 European Chess Club Cup. Yegiazarian won the international tournament in Tbilisi, and won at Batumi in 2001. In 2005, he came in first place in the Aeroflot Open section of the A2 Tournament. He competed at the Chess Olympiads in 1994 and 1996. Yegiazarian was the coach of the Armenian men's national chess team in 1998. In 2000, he became coach of the Armenian women's national team. From 2002, he worked at the Yerevan Chess House as a trainer. Yegiazarian was named a FIDE Senior Trainer in 2010. In 2012, he was awarded the title Honored Coach of Armenia. Yegiazarian, who won the Armenian National Chess Championship in 2005, 2006, and 2007, died on April 20, 2020.

== Achievements ==
- 1984, 1988: Won Armenian Youth Championship (Under-18);
- 1995: Won European Cup being a member of "Yerevan" team;
- 1998: Third place at Armenian Chess Championship;
- 2000: Third place at Armenian Chess Championship;
- 2001: Won International Tournament in Tbilisi;
- 2001: Second place at International Tournament in Batumi;
- 2005: First place at Aeroflot Open section A2 Tournament;
- 2005, 2006, 2007: First place at Armenian National Chess Championship.
