= Nelly Aginian =

Armenian chess player (born 1981)

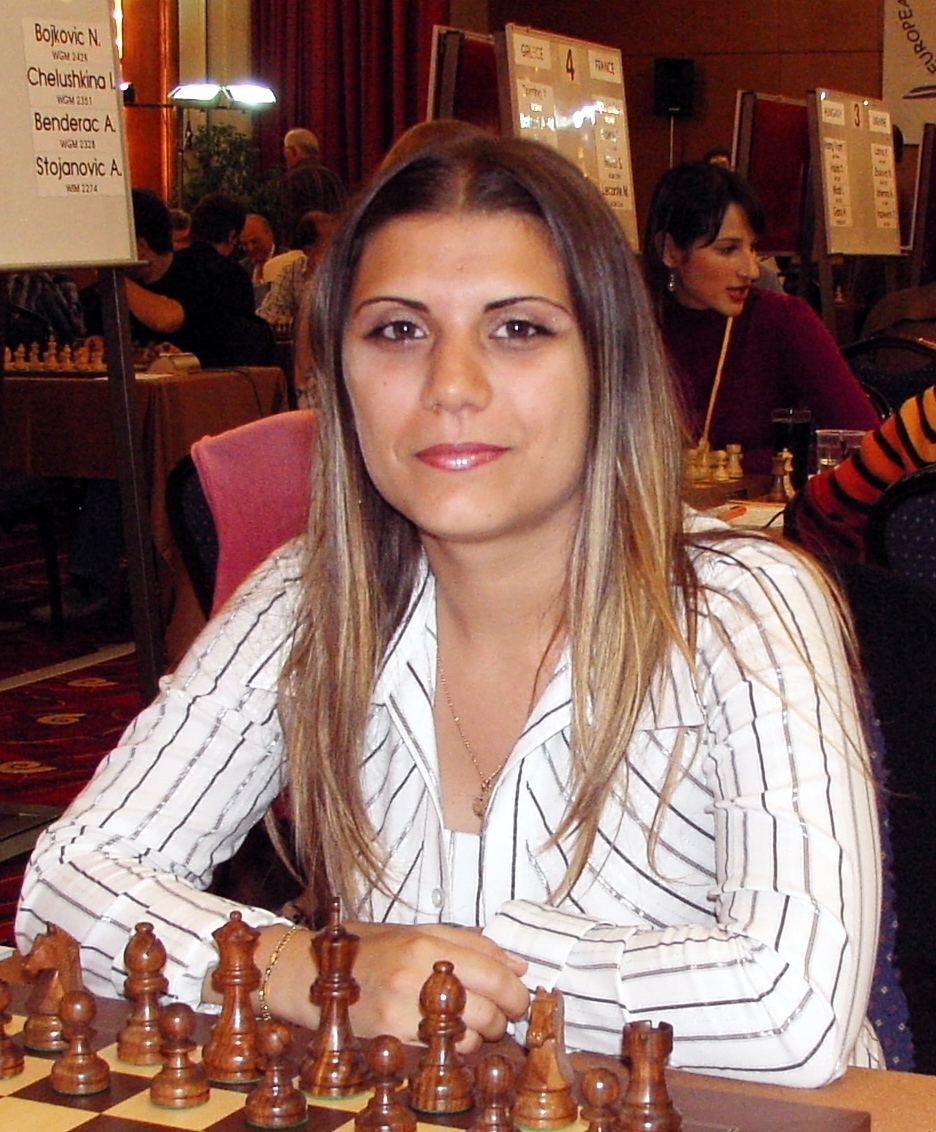
- Nelly Aginian, Heraklion 2007

Personal information
- Born: Նելլի Աղինյան; August 4, 1981 (age 44) Yerevan, Soviet Union

Chess career
- Country: Armenia
- Title: Woman Grandmaster (2005)
- FIDE rating: 2207 (October 2014)
- Peak rating: 2380 (April 2005)

Nelly Aginian (Armenian: Նելլի Աղինյան; born August 4, 1981) is an Armenian chess Woman Grandmaster (WGM).

== Career ==
Aginian became a Woman International Master (WIM) in 2001 and a Woman Grandmaster in 2005. In 2005, she won first place at the Alushta International Tournament. Aginian was a member of the Mika Yerevan chess club team that won the European Chess Club Cup 2006.

She played in the gold medal-winning Armenian Women's team in the 5th European Team Chess Championship in Plovdiv 2003. This team was the first ever European Team Champion from Armenia.

Aginian also competed on the Armenian women team when they won bronze in 2007 at the European Team Championship. She was part of the team in 2005, 2009 and 2011, though they won no medals those years.

Aginian has competed on the Armenia women national chess team for three appearances at the World Team Chess Championship in 2007, 2009 and 2011.

At the Women Chess Olympiad, Aginian has represented Armenia seven times (1996, 1998, 2000, 2004, 2006, 2008 and 2010) at the 33rd Chess Olympiad, 34th Chess Olympiad, 36th Chess Olympiad, 37th Chess Olympiad, 38th Chess Olympiad and 39th Chess Olympiad.
