= Shenavan, Aragatsotn =

Shenavan Շենավան
- Location within Armenia Location within Aragatsotn
- Coordinates: 40°28′59″N 44°22′53″E
- Country: Armenia
- Province: Aragatsotn
- Municipality: Aparan

Population (2011)
  - Total: 1,638
- Time zone: UTC+4
  - Summer (DST): UTC+5

Shenavan (Armenian: Շենավան) is a village in the Aparan Municipality of the Aragatsotn Province of Armenia.
