= Tigran Petrosian Chess House =

Sports venue in Yerevan, Armenia

Coordinates: 40°10′49.30″N 44°31′27.65″E

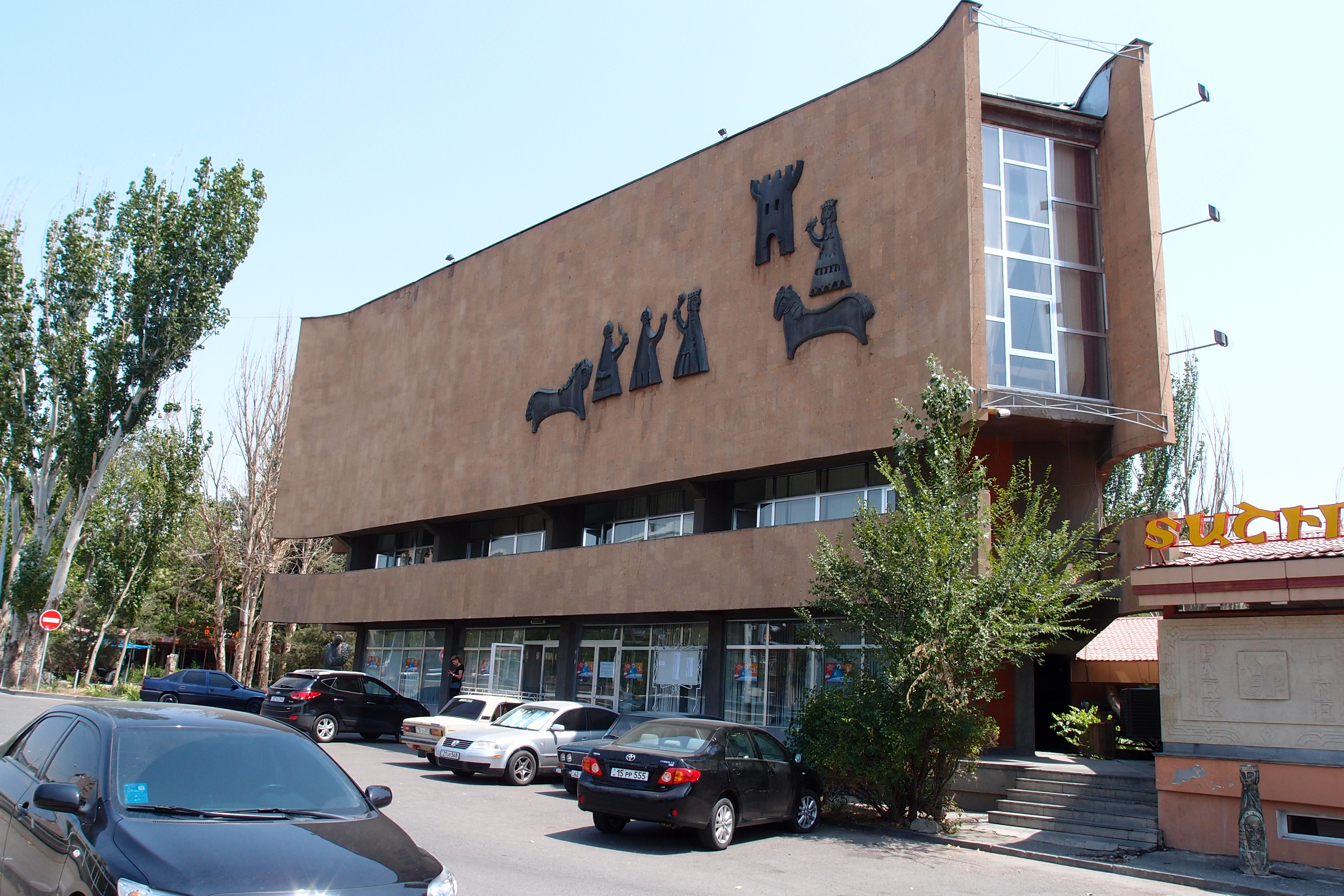
Tigran Petrosian Chess House in Yerevan

Tigran Petrosian Chess House (Armenian: Տիգրան Պետրոսյանի անվան Շախմատի Տուն), officially the Central House of Chess-player named after Tigran Petrosian (Armenian: Տիգրան Պետրոսյանի անվան Շախմատիստի Կենտրոնական Տուն), is the centre of the sport of chess in Yerevan, Armenia. It was opened in 1970. In 1984, it was renamed after the former world chess champion Tigran Petrosian. The architect of the triangular-shaped building was Zhanna Meshcheryakova. Petrosian laid the first stone in the foundation of the building. Currently, the director of the centre is Hrachik Tavadyan.

The chess house is located on Khanjyan street, within the Circular Park of the Kentron district. It is home to the Yerevan chess school operating since 1971.

According to many visitors, the chess house is one of the best chess centers in the world. Many great international events have been regularly held in the building, including the Tigran Petrosian Memorial. It is also the venue of the yearly domestic championship.

The Tigran Petrosian Chess House publishes the "Shakhmatayin Hayastan" weekly (Armenian: Շախմատային Հայաստան, meaning Chess in Armenia) since 1972.

In 1989, the statue of the champion Tigran Petrosian, created by the Armenian sculptor Ara Shiraz, was erected in front of the chess house.

In 2002, the Chess Academy of Armenia was opened.

The chess house is also serving as the home of the Chess Federation of Armenia. The president of Armenia Serzh Sargsyan, is the current head of the Chess Federation of Armenia.

The building of the chess house is listed among the historic and cultural monuments of the city of Yerevan.

== See also ==
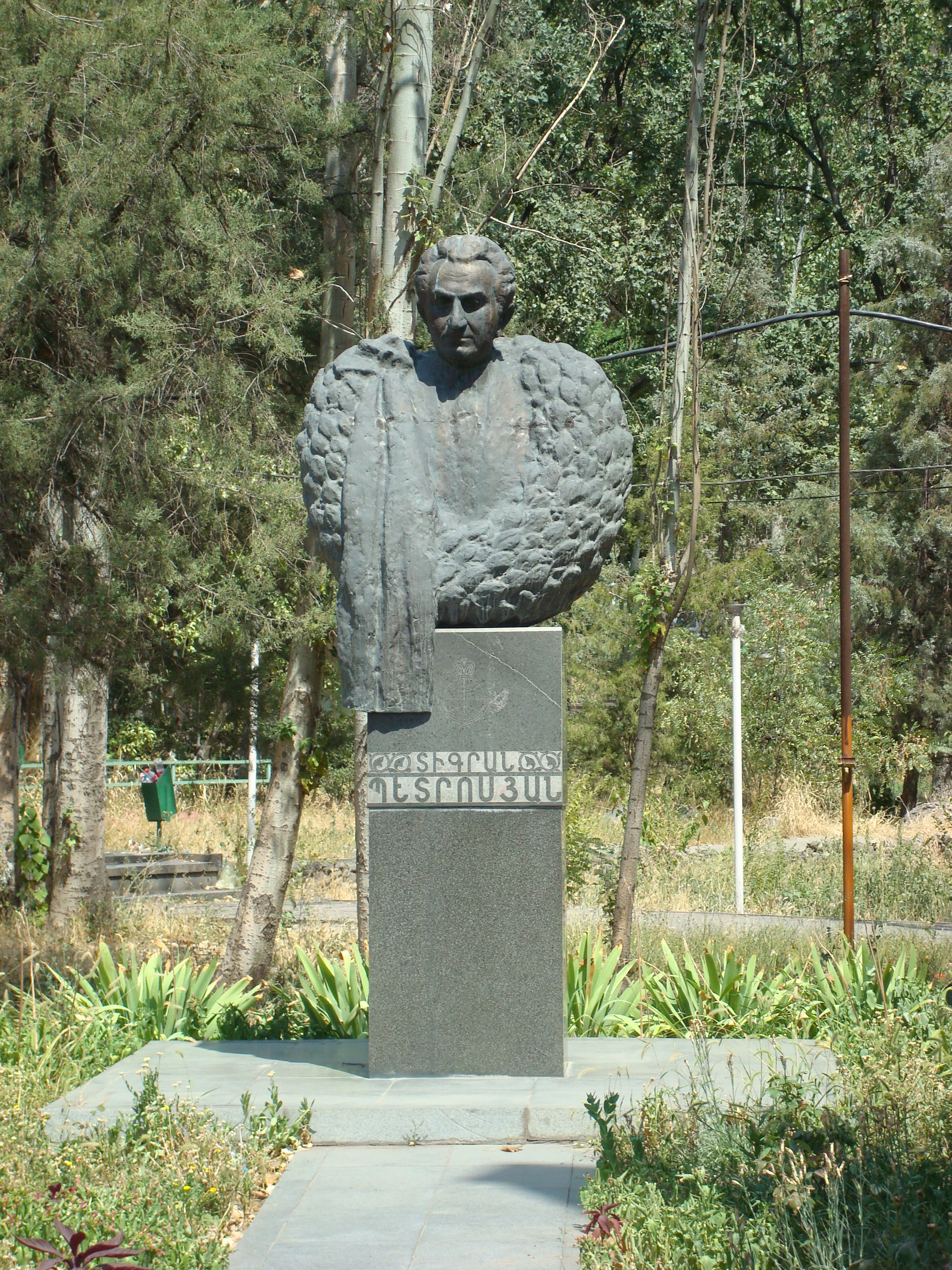
The statue of Tigran Petrosian at the chess house

- Chess in Armenia
- Armenian Chess Championship
- List of Armenian chess players
