= Liana Aghabekian =

Armenian chess player (born 1986)

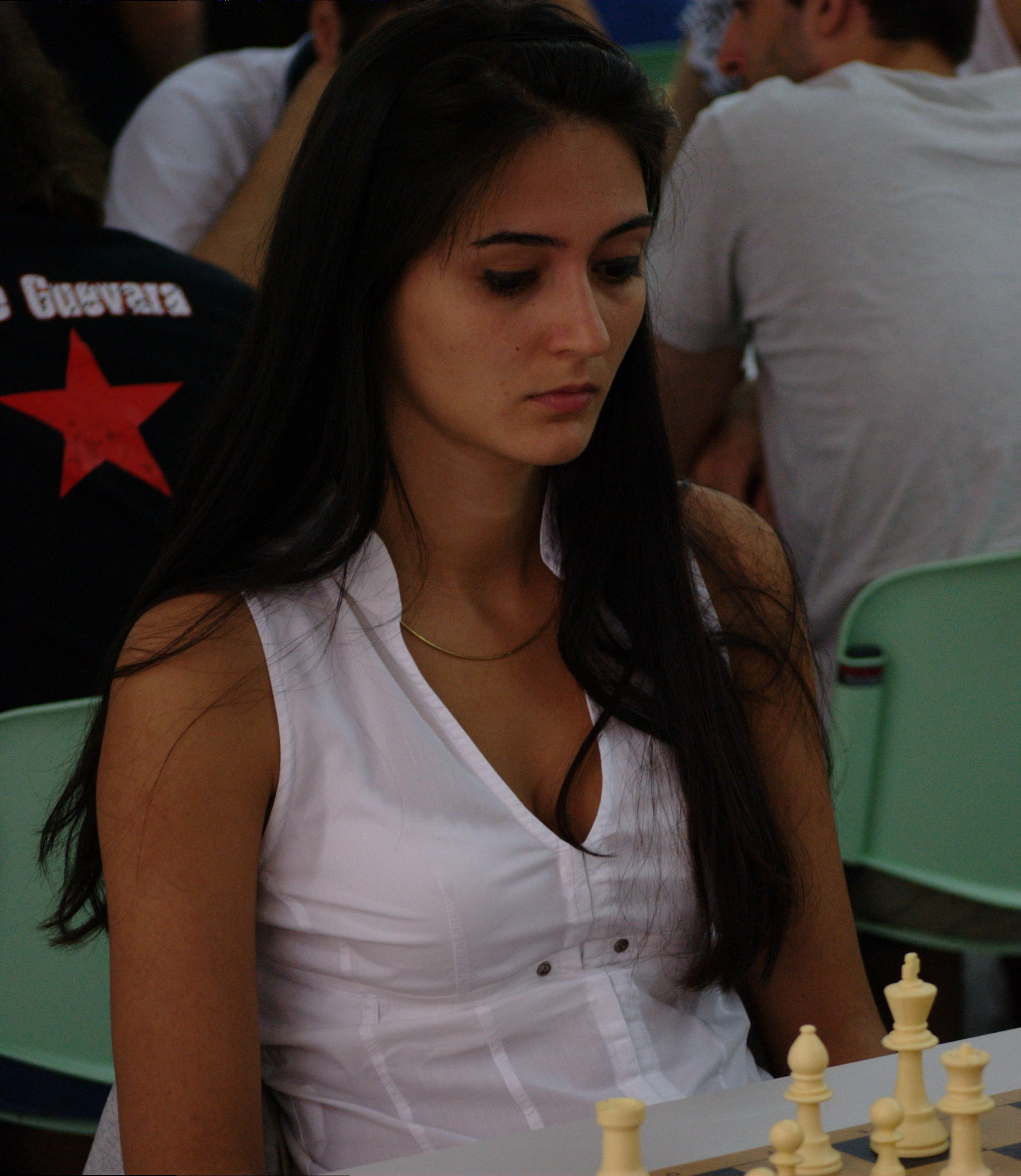
- Liana Aghabekian in 2011

Personal information
- Born: Լիանա Աղաբեկյան; 15 January 1986 (age 40) Vanadzor, Soviet Union

Chess career
- Country: Armenia (until 2017); Luxembourg (since 2017)
- Title: Woman International Master (2011)
- Peak rating: 2218 (July 2007)

Liana Aghabekian (Armenian: Լիանա Աղաբեկյան; born 15 January 1986) is an Armenian and Luxembourgian chess Woman International Master (WIM, 2011). She is Armenian Women's Chess Championship silver medalist (2007) and European Women's Team Chess Championship bronze medalist (2007).

== Biography ==
Liana Aghabekian represented Armenia at the European Youth Chess Championships and the World Youth Chess Championships in various age groups. She is multiple participant in the Armenian Women's Chess Championships, in which she showed the best result in 2007, when she shared first place with Siranush Andriasian, but lost in an additional match for the title of champion.

Liana Aghabekian played for Armenia in the World Women's Team Chess Championships:

- In 2007, at reserve board in the 1st Women's World Team Chess Championship in Yekaterinburg (+2, =2, -3).

Liana Aghabekian played for Armenia in the European Women's Team Chess Championships:

- In 2007, at reserve board in the 7th European Team Chess Championship (women) in Heraklion (+0, =1, -1) and won team bronze medal.

From 2017 Liana Aghabekian transfers to Luxembourg chess federation.

Liana Aghabekian played for Luxembourg in the Women's Chess Olympiad:

- In 2018, at second board in the 43rd Chess Olympiad (women) in Batumi (+4, =3, -3).
