= Arusiak Grigorian =

Armenian chess player

Personal information
- Born: 11 April 1977 (age 49) Armenian SSR, Soviet Union

Chess career
- Country: Armenia
- Title: Woman FIDE Master (1995)
- Peak rating: 2131 (October 2000)

Arusiak Grigorian (Armenian: Արուսյակ Գրիգորյան; born 11 April 1977) is an Armenian chess player with the title of Woman FIDE Master.

== Career ==
Grigorian competed at the 31st Chess Olympiad for Armenia. She also played in the debut of Armenia at the European Team Chess Championship 1992.
