= Melikset Khachiyan =

Armenian-American chess grandmaster (born 1970)

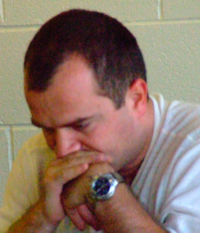

Personal information
- Born: July 6, 1970 (age 56) Baku, Azerbaijan SSR, Soviet Union

Chess career
- Country: Armenia (until 2003); United States (since 2003)
- Title: Grandmaster (2005)
- Peak rating: 2546 (April 2009)

Melikset Khachiyan (Armenian: Մելիքսեթ Խաչիյան; born 6 July 1970 in Baku) is an Armenian-American Grandmaster of chess who now resides in Los Angeles.

== Biography ==
Khachiyan began playing chess at the age of eight. Two years later he won the Baku Junior Championship. When he was twelve, he became a Soviet candidate master. Among his own early coaches was the 9th World Champion, Tigran Petrosian. Also, such great coaches as Aleksander S Nikitin and Alexander Shakarov, who are most known for their coaching and analytical work with the 13th World Champion Garry Kasparov. He earned the title of grandmaster in 2006 after immigrating to the USA.

He competed at the Chess Olympiad of 1996, at the World Team Chess Championship of 1997, where the Armenia national chess team won bronze, their first World Team Championship medal, and at the European Chess Club Cup of 1997.

He was the second coach of Levon Aronian. Currently, he is the coach of Samuel Sevian and of the American women national chess team.
