= Gabriel Sargissian =

Armenian chess grandmaster (born 1983)

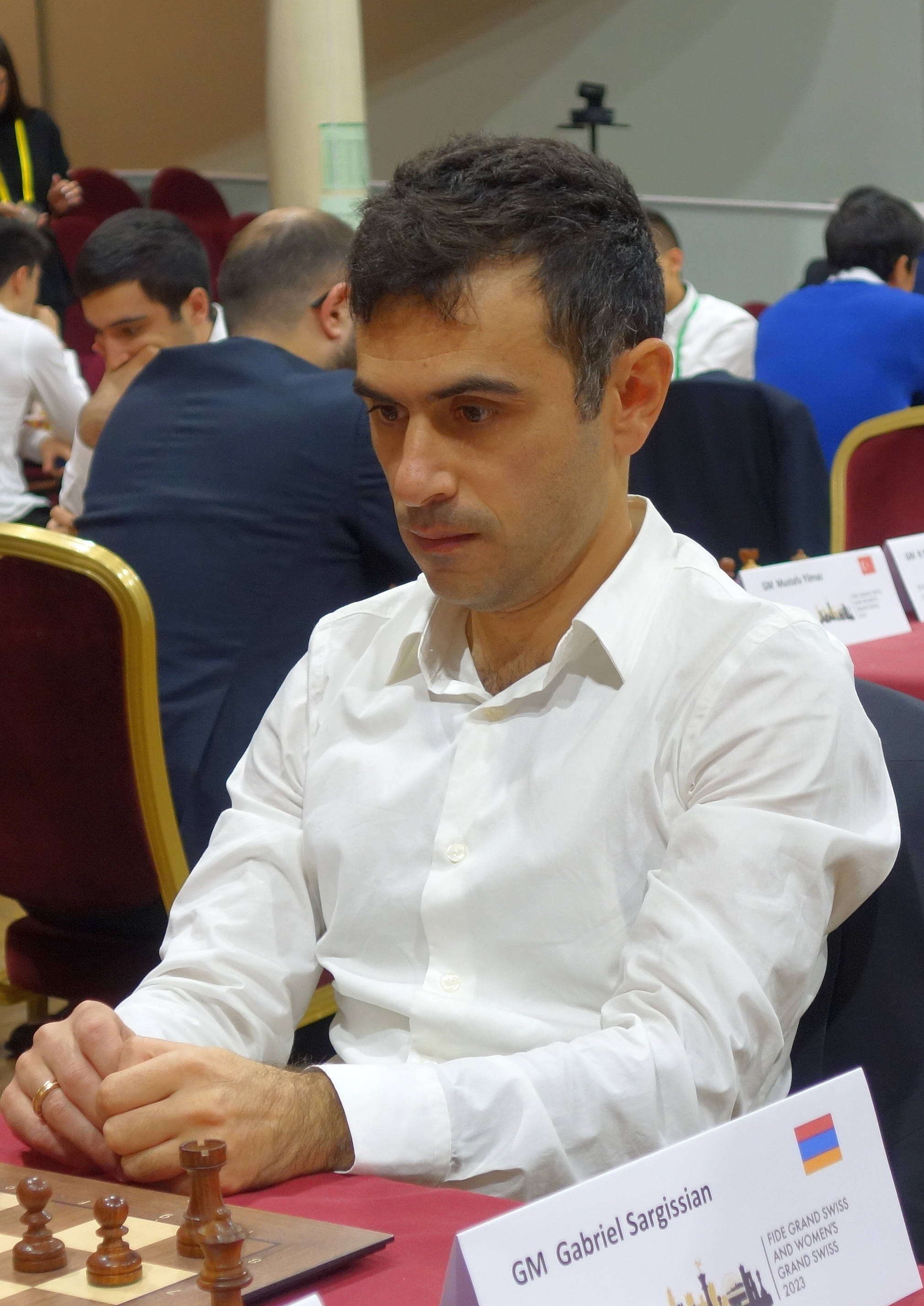

Personal information
- Born: Gabriel Eduardi Sargissian; September 3, 1983 (age 43) Yerevan, Armenian SSR, Soviet Union

Chess career
- Country: Armenia
- Title: Grandmaster (2002)
- FIDE rating: 2614 (October 2026)
- Peak rating: 2711 (September 2022)
- Peak ranking: No. 32 (September 2022)

Gabriel Eduardi Sargissian (Armenian: Գաբրիել Էդուարդի Սարգսյան, Gabriel Eduardi Sargsyan; born 3 September 1983) is an Armenian chess grandmaster. He was a member of the gold medal-winning Armenian team at the Chess Olympiads in 2006, 2008 and 2012 and at the World Team Chess Championship in 2011. Sargissian was awarded the Movses Khorenatsi medal in June 2006 and awarded the Honoured Master of Sport of the Republic of Armenia title in 2009.

== Early years ==
Sargissian was born in Yerevan on 3 September 1983 and was taught to play chess by his grandfather when he was 6. He won the World Youth Chess Championship (under 14) in 1996 and the European Youth Chess Championship (under 16) in 1998. In the same year he became an International Master.

== Career ==
Sargissian won the Armenian Chess Championship in 2000 and 2003. He took part in the FIDE World Chess Championship 2004, but was eliminated in the first round by Sergei Tiviakov. Sargissian was victorious at Reykjavík 2006 and Dubai 2006. At the 8th Dubai Open in 2006, Sargissian scored 7/0 points, sharing first place with Sergey Fedorchuk and compatriot Tigran L. Petrosian. In 2007 he won the Ruy Lopez Festival (Zafra, Spain, March 16–25) finishing with 6.5/7, a 2½ point margin above the rest, including in particular the players Ponomariov, Sasikiran, I. Sokolov, and with a 3021 performance rating. He came in third place at the 2008 Second Ruy López International in Mérida with 4.5/7 points. In 2009 he came first in the 18th Annual Chicago Open. He qualified for the Chess World Cup 2009 and was knocked out by Li Chao in the first round. Sargissian won the Annual Chicago Open 2012 with 7.0/9 points.

In 2014, Sargissian tied for 1st–2nd with Priyadharshan Kannappan in the 23rd Annual Chicago Open. In 2015 he tied for 1st–3rd with Pentala Harikrishna and Laurent Fressinet at the 2nd PokerStars Isle of Man International Chess Tournament in Douglas, Isle of Man. In November 2017, Sargissian won the silver medal for individual performance on board 3 with a 2797 TPR, 6.5/9 score (+4, =5) in the European Team Chess Championship. In December 2017, he shared 1st–3rd places with Hrant Melkumyan and Sebastien Maze in 9th CSC London Chess Classic FIDE Open.

In February 2018, he participated in the Aeroflot Open. He finished eighth out of ninety-two, scoring 6/9 (+3–0=6).

== Team competitions ==
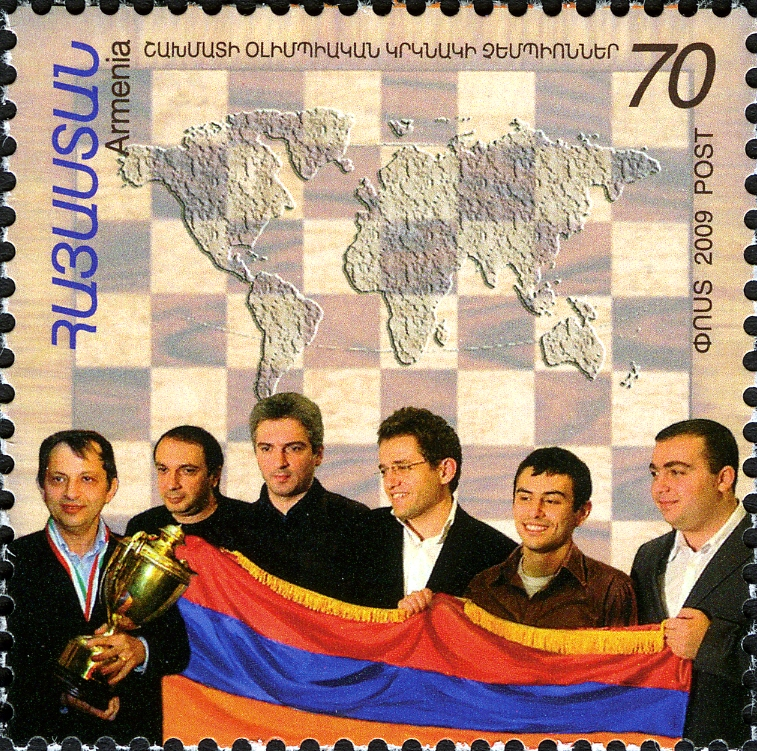
Sargissian (2nd right) with his 2008 Olympiad teammates on a 2009 stamp of Armenia

Sargissian played for Armenia in the Chess Olympiads of 2000, 2002, 2004, 2006, 2008, 2010 and 2012. He took team bronze medal in 2002 and 2004, team gold medal in 2006, 2008 and 2012, and team silver medal em 2022.

On Sargissian's performances at the Chess Olympiads, Grandmaster Peter Svidler commented in 2010: "Gabi Sargissian is a kind of Armenian Hulk: a very good, but nevertheless not brilliant player, who once every two years at the Olympiad turns into a real monster, and in many ways it was due to that metamorphosis that the Armenians twice won the Olympiad.".

Svidler's comment proved to be true once again at the 2022 Chess Olympiads, where Armenia's Silver Medal was largely due to Sargissian's stellar performance in board one, where in the last decisive five rounds he scored 4.5 points, with wins over 4 grandmasters with ratings above 2700: Caruana, Pentala Harikrishna, Mamedyarov and Shirov.

Armenia won its first ever Chess Olympiad at the 37th Chess Olympiad. Sargissian played on board five for the Olympiad. The Armenia national chess team won gold ahead of China and the United States.

In 2008, Sargissian won the 38th Chess Olympiad in Dresden with the Armenia national Chess team, winning gold for the second time in a row at a Chess Olympiad. He played on board three and defeated Alexander Grischuk, the only win in a game with Russia, putting Armenia in the lead. Armenia ended up winning by one point ahead of Israel. In this Chess Olympiad, Sargissian won the gold medal for his individual performance on board three (+7 −0 =4 with an Elo performance rating of 2869). Armenian President Serzh Sargsyan attended the Olympiad to support the team. After the Olympiad, they flew back to Armenia with him on the presidential plane, Air Force Armenia One.

Armenia and Sargissian regained their Olympiad title in 2012 at the 40th Chess Olympiad. This was the third time Armenia won gold at the Olympiad. As the players, one of them was Levon Aronian, were awarded their gold medals, the Armenian national anthem Mer Hayrenik was played and the Armenian flag was raised in Istanbul. Upon returning to Yerevan, the players were welcomed back with a ceremony by many people in the city the moment their airplane touched down in Zvartnots Airport.

The Armenian national chess team won the World Team Chess Championship for the first time in 2011, the tournament took place in Ningbo. Sargissian played on board four. He was a member of the gold medal-winning Armenian team at the World Team Chess Championship 2011. He also played for Armenia in the European Team Chess Championships of 2007, 2009, 2011, 2013 and 2015, winning team silver medal in 2007 and 2015, and individual gold in 2009.

Sargissian played for "CA Linex Magic Mérida" (Spain) in the 23rd European Chess Club Cup in Kemer 2007, winning team gold medal. He played for "MIKA Yerevan" in the European Chess Club Cup in 2008, 2009, 2010 and 2011.

== Awards ==
In June 2006 Sargissian was awarded the Movses Khorenatsi medal, in December 2009 the Medal For Services Contributed to the Motherland and in July 2012 the Order of Honor of the Republic of Armenia.

== Chess school ==
In 2012, together with Levon Aronian, Sargissian founded a chess school in Yerevan, where the most talented chess players between the ages of 10 and 18 can study.

== Personal life ==
Sargissian is married to Liana Avoyan, an alumna of Armenian National Agrarian University. The wedding took place on 28 June 2013 at the Saint Sarkis Cathedral, Yerevan, with Armenian President Serzh Sargsyan in attendance.

== Notable chess games ==
- Gabriel Sargissian vs Etienne Bacrot, Ch World (under 14) 1996, Modern Defense: Two Knights, Suttles Variation (B06), 1-0
- Gabriel Sargissian vs Melikset Khachian, Panormo zt 1998, Gruenfeld Defense: Exchange Variation, Nadanian Attack (D85) 1-0
- Igor Kurnosov vs Gabriel Sargissian, 6th European Individual Championship 2005, Italian Game: Evans Gambit, Tartakower Attack (C52) 0-1
- Gabriel Sargissian vs Marko Tratar, European Team Chess Championships 2007, King's Indian Defense: Fianchetto Variation, Benjamin Defense (E60), 1-0
- Ian Nepomniachtchi vs Gabriel Sargissian, 6th Aeroflot Festival 2007, Center Game: Paulsen Attack Variation (C22), 0-1
- Martin Neubauer vs Gabriel Sargissian, European Team Chess Championships 2007, Spanish Game: Berlin Defense, Rio Gambit Accepted (C67), 0-1
- Gabriel Sargissian vs Alexander Grischuk, 2008 Ol. 2008, Queen's Indian Defense: Fianchetto, Nimzowitsch Variation (E15), 1-0
- Gabriel Sargissian vs Sergey Karjakin, FIDE World Team Championship 2015, Queen's Gambit Declined: Hastings Variation (D30), 1-0
