= Geography of chess =

Governing bodies of the game

Chess, a strategy board game, is played all over the world. The international governing body of chess is FIDE, established in 1924. Most national chess federations are now members of FIDE; several supranational chess organizations are also affiliated with FIDE.

== National level: Current FIDE members ==
The table below lists the member federations of FIDE and their national championship. The number of grandmasters and players registered for each federation in the FIDE database, as of January 2024, are also indicated.

Country	Zone	National federation	#GM	#FIDE	National championship
Afghanistan	3.4	Afghan National Chess Federation	0	452	Afghan Chess Championship
Albania	1.5a	Albania Chess Federation	1	972	Albanian Chess Championship
Algeria	4.1	Fédération Algérienne des échecs	3	6,376	Algerian Chess Championship
Andorra	1.10	Federació d'Escacs Valls d'Andorra	3	175	Andorran Chess Championship
Angola	4.5	Federação Angolana de Xadrez	0	1,889	Angolan Chess Championship
Antigua and Barbuda	2.3.5	Antigua and Barbuda Chess Federation	0	52	–
Argentina	2.5	Argentine Chess Federation	23	14,121	Argentine Chess Championship
Armenia	1.5b	Armenian Chess Federation	40	2,356	Armenian Chess Championship
Aruba	2.3.5	Federashon di Ajedrez di Aruba	0	182	–
Australia	3.6	Australian Chess Federation	10	7,276	Australian Chess Championship
Austria	1.2a	Österreichischer Schachbund	11	9,553	Austrian Chess Championship
Azerbaijan	1.8	Azerbaijan Chess Federation	30	7,219	Azerbaijani Chess Championship
Bahamas	2.3.5	Bahamas Chess Federation	0	202	Bahamian Chess Championship
Bahrain	3.1	Bahrain Mind Sports Association	0	791	Bahraini Chess Championship
Bangladesh	3.2	Bangladesh Chess Federation	5	9,637	Bangladeshi Chess Championship
Barbados	2.3.5	Barbados Chess Federation	0	688	Barbadian Chess Championship
Belarus	1.8	Belarus Chess Federation	15	3,119	Belarusian Chess Championship
Belgium	1.1b	FRBE-KBSB-KSB	9	8,893	Belgian Chess Championship
Belize	2.3.2	Belize Chess Federation	0	9	Belize National Chess Championship
Bermuda	2.3.5	Bermuda Chess Association	0	193	–
Bhutan	3.2	Bhutan Chess Federation	0	133	Bhutan National Premier Chess Championship
Bolivia	2.4	Federación Boliviana de Ajedrez	1	5,454	Bolivian Chess Championship
Bosnia and Herzegovina	1.2b	Sahovski Savez Bosne i Hercegovine	7	3,881	Bosnia and Herzegovina Chess Championship
Botswana	4.5	Botswana Chess Federation	0	2,888	Botswana Chess Championship
Brazil	2.4	Confed. Brasileira de Xadrez	15	26,903	Brazilian Chess Championship
British Virgin Islands	2.3.5	British Virgin Islands Chess Federation	0	10	–
Brunei	3.3	Brunei Chess Federation	0	366	Brunei Chess Championship
Bulgaria	1.4	Bulgarian Chess Federation	35	6,120	Bulgarian Chess Championship
Burkina Faso	4.2	Comité National Burkinabé des Échecs	0	46	Burkinabé Chess Championship
Burundi	4.3	Burundi Chess Federation	0	82	Burundian Chess Championship
Cambodia	3.3	Cambodian Chess Federation	0	20	Cambodian Chess Championship
Cameroon	4.3	Cameroon Chess Federation	0	196	Cameroonian Chess Championship
Canada	2.2	Chess Federation of Canada	14	6,051	Canadian Chess Championship
Cape Verde	4.2	Federação Cabo-verdiana de Xadrez	0	270	Cape Verdean Chess Championship
Cayman Islands	2.3.5	Cayman Islands Chess Federation	0	68	-
Central African Republic	4.3	Chess Federation of Central African Republic	0	100	Central African Chess Championship
Chad	4.3	Chad Chess Federation	0	17	-
Chile	2.5	Fed. Deportiva Nacional De Ajedrez	6	7,422	Chilean Chess Championship
China	3.5	Chinese Chess Association	51	5,024	Chinese Chess Championship
Chinese Taipei	3.3	Chinese Taipei Chess Association	1	521	Taiwanese Chess Championship
Colombia	2.3.4	Fed. Colombiana de Ajedrez	11	13,176	Colombian Chess Championship
Comoros	4.4	Comoros Islands Chess Federation	0	44	Comorian Chess Championship
Republic of the Congo	4.3	Congolese Chess Federation	0	97	Congolese Chess Championship
Costa Rica	2.3.2	Federacion Central de Ajedrez	1	6,264	Costa Rican Chess Championship
Croatia	1.2b	Hrvatski šahovski savez	30	11,726	Croatian Chess Championship
Cuba	2.3.3	Fed. Cubana de Ajedrez	26	3,518	Cuban Chess Championship
Cyprus	1.10	Cyprus Chess Federation	0	1,296	Cypriot Chess Championship
Czech Republic	1.4	Šachový svaz České republiky	33	16,984	Czech Chess Championship
Denmark	1.3	Dansk Skak Union	16	8,092	Danish Chess Championship
Djibouti	4.4	Djiboutian Chess Federation	0	130	Djiboutian Chess Championship
Dominica	2.3.5	Dominica Chess Federation	0	37	-
Dominican Republic	2.3.5	Federación Dominicana de Ajedrez	1	3,470	Dominican Chess Championship
Ecuador	2.4	Ecuadorian Chess Federation	1	5,560	Ecuadorian Chess Championship
Egypt	4.1	Egyptian Chess Federation	6	16,217	Egyptian Chess Championship
El Salvador	2.3.2	Federación Salvadoreña de Ajedrez	0	1,072	Salvadoran Chess Championship
England	1.1a	English Chess Federation	40	13,885	British Chess Championship
Equatorial Guinea	4.3	National Chess Federation of Equatorial Guinea	0	65	-
Eritrea	4.4	Eritrea Chess Federation	0	171	Eritrean Chess Championship
Estonia	1.7	Eesti Maleliit	6	2,685	Estonian Chess Championship
Eswatini	4.5	Eswatini National Chess Federation	0	288	Swazi Chess Championship
Ethiopia	4.4	Ethiopian Chess Federation	0	1,071	Ethiopian Chess Championship
Faroe Islands	1.10	Talvsamband Føroya	1	532	Faroese Chess Championship
Fiji	3.6	Fiji Chess Federation	0	435	Fijian Chess Championship
Finland	1.3	Suomen Keskusshakkiliitto	4	2,154	Finnish Chess Championship
France	1.1b	French Chess Federation	55	98,861	French Chess Championship
Gabon	4.3	Fédération Gabonaise des Échecs	0	123	Gabonese Chess Championship
Gambia	4.2	Gambia Chess Federation	0	75	Gambian Chess Championship
Georgia	1.5b	Chess Federation of Georgia	31	4,542	Georgian Chess Championship
Germany	1.2a	Deutscher Schachbund	97	47,579	German Chess Championship
Ghana	4.2	Ghana Chess Association	0	358	Ghanaian Chess Championship
Greece	1.5a	Elliniki Skakistiki Omospondia	17	28,134	Greek Chess Championship
Grenada	2.3.5	Grenada Chess Federation	0	21	-
Guam	3.6	Guam Chess Federation	0	432	–
Guatemala	2.3.2	Fed. Nac. de Ajedrez de Guatemala	0	764	Guatemalan Chess Championship
Guernsey	1.10	Guernsey Chess Federation	0	41	Guernsey Chess Championship
Guyana	2.3.5	Guyana Chess Federation	0	302	Guyanese Chess Championship
Haiti	2.3.5	Haitian Chess Federation	0	252	Haitian Chess Championship
Honduras	2.3.2	Federación Nacional de Ajedrez de Honduras	0	1,318	Honduran Chess Championship
Hong Kong	3.3	Hong Kong Chess Federation	0	1,654	Hong Kong Chess Championship
Hungary	1.4	Magyar Sakkszövetség	52	12,532	Hungarian Chess Championship
Iceland	1.3	Skáksamband Íslands	15	3,021	Icelandic Chess Championship
India	3.7	All India Chess Federation	92	134,560	Indian Chess Championship
Indonesia	3.3	Persatuan Catur Seluruh Indonesia	4	3,364	Indonesian Chess Championship
Iran	3.1	Chess Fed. of Islamic Rep. of Iran	15	63,462	Iranian Chess Championship
Iraq	3.1	Iraqi Chess Federation	0	3,705	Iraqi Chess Championship
Ireland	1.1a	Irish Chess Union	1	2,971	Irish Chess Championship
Israel	1.2b	Israel Chess Federation	49	7,538	Israeli Chess Championship
Italy	1.1c	Federazione Scacchistica Italiana	18	32,862	Italian Chess Championship
Ivory Coast	4.2	Fédération Ivoirienne des Échecs	0	556	Ivorian Chess Championship
Jamaica	2.3.5	Jamaica Chess Federation	0	1,073	Jamaican Chess Championship
Japan	3.3	National Chess Society of Japan	0	609	Japanese Chess Championship
Jersey	1.10	Jersey Chess Federation	0	223	Jersey Chess Championship
Jordan	3.1	Royal Jordanian Chess Federation	1	2,908	Jordanian Chess Championship
Kazakhstan	3.4	Kazakhstan Chess Federation	18	13,681	Kazakhstani Chess Championship
Kenya	4.4	Chess Kenya	0	4,797	Kenyan Chess Championship
Kosovo	1.2b	Kosovo Chess Federation	0	875	Kosovan Chess Championship
Kuwait	3.1	Kuwait Chess Federation	0	834	Kuwaiti Chess Championship
Kyrgyzstan	3.4	Chess Federation of the Kyrgyz Republic	0	4,782	Kyrgyzstani Chess Championship
Laos	3.3	Lao Chess Federation	0	202	Laotian Chess Championship
Latvia	1.7	Latvian Chess Federation	10	4,537	Latvian Chess Championship
Lebanon	3.1	Federation Libanaise des Echecs	0	2,480	Lebanese Chess Championship
Lesotho	4.5	Chess Federation of Lesotho	0	434	Lesotho Chess Championship
Liberia	4.2	Liberia Chess Federation	0	328	Liberian Chess Championship
Libya	4.1	General Libyan Chess Federation	0	1,881	Libyan Chess Championship
Liechtenstein	1.10	Liechtensteiner Schachverband	0	45	Liechtenstein Chess Championship
Lithuania	1.7	Lietuvos šachmatų federacija	11	6,341	Lithuanian Chess Championship
Luxembourg	1.10	Federation Luxembourgeoise des Echecs	0	875	Luxembourg Chess Championship
Macau	3.3	Grupo de Xadrez de Macau	0	86	–
Madagascar	4.4	Madagascar Chess Federation	0	953	Malagasy Chess Championship
Malawi	4.5	Chess Association of Malawi	0	1,009	Malawian Chess Championship
Malaysia	3.3	Malaysian Chess Federation	1	15,533	Malaysian Chess Championship
Maldives	3.2	Maldives Chess Federation	0	573	Maldivian Chess Championship
Mali	4.2	Federation Malienne du Jeu D'Echecs	0	135	Malian Chess Championship
Malta	1.10	Il-Federazzjoni Maltija tac-Cess	0	142	Maltese Chess Championship
Mauritania	4.1	Mauritanian Chess Federation	0	839	Mauritanian Chess Championship
Mauritius	4.4	Mauritius Chess Federation	0	69	Mauritian Chess Championship
Mexico	2.3.1	Fed. Nac. de Ajedrez de Mexico AC	5	14,128	Mexican Chess Championship
Moldova	1.8	Federația de Șah a Republicii Moldova	7	1,524	Moldovan Chess Championship
Monaco	1.10	Monaco Chess Federation	3	303	Monaco Chess Championship
Mongolia	3.3	Mongolian Chess Federation	8	2,663	Mongolian Chess Championship
Montenegro	1.5a	Montenegro Chess Federation	11	1,377	Montenegrin Chess Championship
Morocco	4.1	Fed. Royale Marocaine des Echecs	1	4,879	Moroccan Chess Championship
Mozambique	4.5	Mozambique Chess Federation	0	634	Mozambican Chess Championship
Myanmar	3.3	Myanmar Chess Federation	0	2,354	Myanmar Chess Championship
Namibia	4.5	Namibia Chess Federation	0	1,206	Namibian Chess Championship
Nauru	3.6	Nauru Chess Federation	0	69	Nauruan Chess Championship
Nepal	3.2	Nepal Chess Association	0	4,986	Nepalese Chess Championship
Netherlands	1.1b	Royal Dutch Chess Federation	43	10,479	Dutch Chess Championship
Netherlands Antilles	2.3.5	Curaçao Chess Federation	0	276	Netherlands Antilles Chess Championship
New Zealand	3.6	New Zealand Chess Federation	1	2,547	New Zealand Chess Championship
Nicaragua	2.3.2	Federacion Nicaragüense de Ajedrez	0	1,255	Nicaraguan Chess Championship
Niger	4.2	Niger Chess Federation	0	69	-
Nigeria	4.2	Nigeria Chess Federation	0	3,878	Nigerian Chess Championship
North Macedonia	1.2b	Chess Federation of Macedonia	10	1,749	Macedonian Chess Championship
Norway	1.3	Norges Sjakkforbund	18	8,552	Norwegian Chess Championship
Oman	3.1	Oman Chess Committee	0	2,595	Omani Chess Championship
Pakistan	3.2	Chess Federation of Pakistan	0	2,963	Pakistani Chess Championship
Palau	3.6	Palau Chess Federation	0	267	Palauan Chess Championship
Palestine	3.1	Palestine Chess Federation	0	2,410	Palestinian Chess Championship
Panama	2.3.2	Fed. de Ajedrez de Panama	0	2,786	Panamanian Chess Championship
Papua New Guinea	3.6	Papua New Guinea Chess Federation	0	22	Papua New Guinean Chess Championship
Paraguay	2.5	Federacion Paraguaya de Ajedrez	5	1,724	Paraguayan Chess Championship
Peru	2.4	Federacion Peruana de Ajedrez	10	13,178	Peruvian Chess Championship
Philippines	3.3	National Chess Federation of the Philippines	13	11,996	Philippine Chess Championship
Poland	1.4	Polish Chess Federation	50	43,572	Polish Chess Championship
Portugal	1.1c	Federação Portuguesa de Xadrez	4	8,047	Portuguese Chess Championship
Puerto Rico	2.3.5	Fed. de Ajedrez de Puerto Rico	0	1,316	Puerto Rican Chess Championship
Qatar	3.1	Qatar Chess Association	3	186	Qatari Chess Championship
Romania	1.4	Federația Română de Șah	26	13,041	Romanian Chess Championship
Russia	3.8	Chess Federation of Russia	185	120,128	Russian Chess Championship
Rwanda	4.4	Rwanda Chess Federation	0	192	Rwandan Chess Championship
Saint Kitts and Nevis	2.3.5	Saint Kitts and Nevis Chess Federation	0	12	-
Saint Lucia	2.3.5	Saint Lucia Chess Federation	0	70	-
Saint Vincent and the Grenadines	2.3.5	Saint Vincent and the Grenadines Chess Federation	0	21	-
San Marino	1.10	Federazione Sammarinese degli Scacchi	0	54	Sammarinese Chess Championship
São Tomé and Príncipe	4.3	Sao Tome and Principe Chess Federation	0	170	São Tomé and Príncipe Chess Championship
Saudi Arabia	3.1	Saudi Chess Association	0	3,516	Saudi Arabian Chess Championship
Scotland	1.1a	Chess Scotland	6	1,468	Scottish Chess Championship
Senegal	4.2	Senegalese Chess Federation	1	194	Senegalese Chess Championship
Serbia	1.5a	Chess Federation of Serbia	53	12,767	Serbian Chess Championship
Seychelles	4.4	Seychelles Chess Federation	0	79	Seychelles Chess Championship
Sierra Leone	4.2	Sierra Leone Chess Federation	0	79	Sierra Leonean Chess Championship
Singapore	3.3	Singapore Chess Federation	5	5,618	Singaporean Chess Championship
Slovakia	1.4	Slovenský šachový zväz	14	9,528	Slovak Chess Championship
Slovenia	1.2a	Šahovska Zveza Slovenije	14	7,053	Slovenian Chess Championship
Solomon Islands	3.6	Solomon Islands Chess Federation	0	122	Solomon Island Chess Championship
Somalia	4.4	Somali Chess Federation	0	146	Somali Chess Championship
South Africa	4.5	Chess South Africa	1	8,599	South African Chess Championship
South Korea	3.3	Korea Chess Federation	1	2,416	South Korean Chess Championship
South Sudan	4.4	South Sudan Chess Federation	0	502	South Sudanese Chess Championship
Spain	1.1c	Federacion Espanola de Ajedrez	59	74,610	Spanish Chess Championship
Sri Lanka	3.2	Chess Federation of Sri Lanka	0	21,776	Sri Lankan Chess Championship
Sudan	4.4	Sudan Chess Federation	0	1,664	Sudanese Chess Championship
Suriname	2.3.5	De Surinaamse Schaakbond	0	637	Surinamese Chess Championship
Sweden	1.3	Sveriges Schackförbund	25	8,537	Swedish Chess Championship
Switzerland	1.2a	Schweizerischer Schachbund	11	5,854	Swiss Chess Championship
Syria	3.1	Syrian Arab Chess Federation	0	1,531	Syrian Chess Championship
Tajikistan	3.4	Federazijai Shakhmati Tajikistan	1	409	Tajikistani Chess Championship
Tanzania	4.4	Tanzania Chess Association	0	242	Tanzanian Chess Championship
Thailand	3.3	Thailand Chess Association	0	2,087	Thai Chess Championship
Timor-Leste	3.3	Federação Xadrez de Timor-Leste	0	594	Timorese Chess Championship
Togo	4.2	Togolese Chess Federation	0	546	Togolese Chess Championship
Trinidad and Tobago	2.3.5	Trinidad and Tobago Chess Association	0	1,326	Trinidad and Tobago Chess Championship
Tunisia	4.1	Tunisian Chess Federation	3	4,933	Tunisian Chess Championship
Turkey	1.5a	Turkish Chess Federation	14	49,282	Turkish Chess Championship
Turkmenistan	3.4	Turkmenistan Chess Federation	7	1,347	Turkmen Chess Championship
Uganda	4.4	Uganda Chess Federation	0	3,870	Ugandan Chess Championship
Ukraine	1.9	Ukrainian Chess Federation	88	18,518	Ukrainian Chess Championship
United Arab Emirates	3.1	UAE Chess Federation	2	3,244	Emirati Chess Championship
United States	2.1	United States Chess Federation	106	25,204	U.S. Chess Championship; U.S. Women's Chess Championship
United States Virgin Islands	2.3.5	US Virgin Islands Chess Federation	0	73	–
Uruguay	2.5	Federación Uruguaya de Ajedrez	3	2,453	Uruguayan Chess Championship
Uzbekistan	3.4	Chess Federation of Uzbekistan	17	3,304	Uzbekistani Chess Championship
Venezuela	2.3.5	Fed. Venezolana de Ajedrez	1	11,363	Venezuelan Chess Championship
Vietnam	3.3	Vietnam Chess Federation	13	6,065	Vietnamese Chess Championship
Wales	1.1a	Welsh Chess Union	0	830	Welsh Chess Championship
Yemen	3.1	Yemen Chess Association	0	656	Yemeni Chess Championship
Zambia	4.5	Chess Federation of Zambia	1	2,932	Zambian Chess Championship
Zimbabwe	4.5	Zimbabwe Chess Federation	0	1,863	Zimbabwean Chess Championship

In addition, the Isle of Man Chess Association (since 2020), the Chess League of New Caledonia (Ligue d'Echecs de Nouvelle-Calédonie, since 2023), and the Greenlandic Chess Federation (since 2024) are affiliated organizations.

=== Former FIDE members ===
The list below includes nations that no longer exist as well as national federations that are currently not members of FIDE.

Country	National federation	National championship
Czechoslovakia		Czechoslovak Chess Championship
Soviet Union	USSR Chess Federation	USSR Chess Championship
Yugoslavia		Yugoslav Chess Championship

== Supranational level ==
Countries (zone)	Federation	Official Website	Championships
Europe (1)	European Chess Union (ECU)		Individual, Youth, Junior, Senior and Team
America (2)	Confederation of Chess for America (CCA)		Pan American Chess Championship
Asia (3)	Asian Chess Federation (ACF)		Asian Chess Championship, Asian Senior Chess Championship
Africa (4)	African Chess Confederation (ACC)		African Chess Championship
Arab world	Arab Chess Federation (ACF)		Arab Chess Championship
ASEAN	ASEAN Chess Confederation		–
Commonwealth of Nations	Commonwealth Chess Association (CCA)		Commonwealth Chess Championship
European microstates	–	–	European Small Nations Chess Championship
Francophone countries	International Chess Federation of French-speaking countries (AIDEF)		AIDEF Chess Championship
Ibero-America	Iberoamerican Chess Federation (FIBDA)		Iberoamerican Chess Championship
Mediterranean countries	Mediterranean Chess Association		Mediterranean Chess Championship
Nordic countries	Nordic Chess Federation		Nordic Chess Championship
Oceania (3.6)	Oceania Chess Confederation (OCC)		Oceania Chess Championship
South America	-	-	South American Chess Championship
