= Concerns and controversies at the 45th Chess Olympiad =

There were several concerns and controversies related to the 45th Chess Olympiad, which took place in Budapest, Hungary, from 10 to 22 September 2024.

== Sanctions against Russia and Belarus ==
In March 2022, following the recommendation by the International Olympic Committee in response to the Russian invasion of Ukraine, the FIDE Council suspended the national teams of Russia and Belarus from participation in official FIDE tournaments until further notice. As a result, the national teams of both countries did not enter the 44th Chess Olympiad, and some players who disapproved of the invasion decided to leave the country, switch federations or play under the FIDE flag instead of the Russian flag.

=== Conditional ban for the Chess Federation of Russia ===
In June 2024, the FIDE Ethics & Disciplinary Commission (EDC) imposed a two-year conditional ban on the Chess Federation of Russia (CFR) and reprimanded FIDE President Arkady Dvorkovich for violations related to the Russian invasion of Ukraine. The EDC found the CFR guilty of damaging FIDE's reputation or bringing chess into disrepute, non-compliance with FIDE principles, violation of duty or obligation imposed by the FIDE Charter and disparagement of FIDE's reputation and interest. The violations were a consequence of the CFR's board of trustees consisting of several individuals who were subject to international sanctions as well as the CFR organising chess events in illegally occupied parts of Ukraine. Dvorkovich and the president of the Russian Chess Federation argued that the EDC had no authority to make the decision.

In September 2024, the appeal submitted by Dvorkovich and the CFR on the decision made by a First Instance Chamber of the EDC to suspend the CFR from organising events on Ukrainian territory according to the IOC and FIDE jurisdictions was accepted, and the Appeal Chamber of the EDC reduced the sanction from a suspension to a fine of €45,000. This decision was surprising given that FIDE statutes, similarly to the IOC statutes and those of other sport federations, use the United Nations maps to determine jurisdictions for holding of sport events. Magnus Carlsen's coach Peter Heine Nielsen commented that they were planning to appeal the decision of the Appeal Chamber to the Court of Arbitration for Sport after they had found information that EDC President Francois P. Strydom was connected to the Russian law firm Sila Lawyers, which represents several Russian sport federations. The Lithuanian Chess Federation issued a statement in which they condemned the decision of the EDC. The secretary general of the European Chess Union Theodoros Tsorbatzoglou issued a personal statement in which he criticised the decision made by the secondary FIDE disciplinary committee. Tsorbatzoglou's statement on the decision of the Appeal Chamber of the EDC was linked to the resolution submitted by the Kyrgyzstan Chess Federation as its president and initiator of the resolution Babur Tolbaev was amongst the candidates for EDC chairman.

=== Kyrgyz proposal to restore full membership ===
In August 2024, the Kyrgyzstan Chess Federation submitted a resolution to the FIDE Congress to restore the full membership rights of the Chess Federation of Russia and the Belarusian Chess Federation with an immediate effect, which had to be discussed at the meeting of the General Assembly during the FIDE Congress at the Chess Olympiad in Budapest. Following the resolution, the German Chess Federation issued a statement in which they strongly objected to the proposal. The chess federations of the United Kingdom and the United States also opposed the proposal stating that it would hand a symbolic victory to Vladimir Putin. The president of Ukrainian Chess Federation Oleksandr Kamyshin published a statement from his X account that he would work to stop the resolution being approved. He added that 21 chess players had already been killed in Ukraine and two more were still missing as a result of the invasion. Kamyshin urged that FIDE remove the topic from the agenda. Former World Champion Garry Kasparov supported Kamyshin. Malcolm Pein of the English Chess Federation said that Russia's control of FIDE was absolute. He added that they were staging a slow takeover of the federation with changes in its constitution and the way the decisions were made. Ukrainian chess player Vasyl Ivanchuk signed a petition against the Kyrgyz resolution, which was later signed by the whole Olympic team of Ukraine, urging not to lift the sanctions against Russia. As a result of the proposed resolution, the potential exclusion of chess from IOC was brought to a table, which might put the government funding for national chess federations at risk. George Mastrokouskos compared the situation of FIDE with that of the International Boxing Association (IBA), which had recently been excluded from IOC.

On 19 September 2024, while receiving the FIDE 100 Award for Best Male Player, Magnus Carlsen spoke clearly against lifting the suspension of the Russian and Belarusian chess federations. The CFR reacted to his speech by stating that he could play chess but should not meddle into things that he did not understand. In addition, the vice president of the Chess Federation of Russia Sergey Smagin stated that Carlsen represents the Norwegian Chess Federation, which had always stood sharply against Russia. He added that Carlsen's professional career had started in Russia and said that it would be nice if Carlsen returned the money he had earned and all the prizes he had won in tournaments held there.

On the same day, the FIDE Council rejected the proposal by the Kyrgyz Chess Federation to restore the full membership rights of the Russian Chess Federation and the Belarusian Chess Federation with immediate effect. This decision came after several national federations and chess players raised their voices against the proposals, and national federations of FIDE had received warning messages by the International Olympic Committee (IOC), the Association of IOC Recognised International Sports Federations (AIRISF) and Western government agencies. Nonetheless, it was suggested that FIDE should consult the IOC to allow Russian disabled or junior teams to be excluded from the ban.

On 20 September 2024, the United States Department of State issued a statement in which they called on FIDE to maintain the ban. They stated that there was no place for the Russian and Belarusian flags at the chess tournaments while chess players in Ukraine were being killed by Russia's forces, and they urged the national chess federations to continue to stand with Ukraine. United States ambassador to Ukraine Bridget A. Brink as well as the Bureau of Educational and Cultural Affairs shared this view from their X accounts.

On 22 September, the General Assembly upheld the ban on Russian and Belarusian players, but it supported a move to consider easing the restrictions on disabled and junior players in consultation with the IOC.

== Before the Olympiad ==
=== Accommodation ===
In early 2024, many chess federations and delegations raised concerns regarding difficulties with accommodation and the extra costs incurred. President of the Monaco Chess Federation Jean-Michel Rapaire explained that, according to the initial invitation sent by the organisers to chess federations on 18 April, all teams would get two free standard double rooms and two free standard single rooms with full board, whereas the chief of delegation would be provided with a standard single room with full board. However, on 15 August, they were emailed that the chief of delegation is at their own cost and would not stay in the same hotel. The chess federations of Germany and Scotland reported that their teams had been scattered in different hotels. Eventually, Monaco, Germany and Scotland rented accommodation on their own outside of the official hotels recommended by the organisers. Similar accommodation problems were later stated by the delegations from Turkey, Croatia and Bulgaria. Malcolm Pein reported that the organisers had no understanding that many countries would need extra rooms in addition to the standard offer of two free single and four free double rooms per team. Dutch player Anish Giri commented on the situation that there were not enough hotel rooms at the Olympiad. FIDE Chief Executive Officer Emil Sutovsky faced criticism for his alleged ignorance of the situation.

=== Visas ===
A source associated with FIDE revealed that up to 60 countries were experiencing visa problems for the Chess Olympiad, and most of these countries were from Africa and the Caribbean. As of 9 September, the list of countries with visa problems included Algeria, Eswatini, Lesotho, Gambia, Central African Republic, Tunisia and Egypt from Africa as well as Afghanistan, Lebanon, Yemen, Syria and Iraq. Afghan player on board four Sepehr Sakhawaty explained that the team applied for visas on 7 August at the Embassy of Hungary in Iran, as there is no Hungarian embassy working in Afghanistan. The whole team's applications were rejected on 5 September. They requested an appeal from the embassy on 7 September, but were still awaiting response one day before the start of the Olympiad. In the first round, a total of 20 teams in the Open and Women's sections were not paired largely due to visa and travel problems. President of the Hungarian Chess Federation Zoltán Polyánszky said that they did a lot to get teams to Budapest. He added that teams were still on their way and asked one to two days of patience. FIDE president Arkady Dvorkovich mentioned the rejection rate for the Chess Olympiad was significantly lower than the normal rejection rate of 16.5 per cent for the Schengen Area.

== During the Olympiad ==
=== Transport difficulties ===
The accommodation problems caused members of the national delegations to be scattered across different hotels, contributing to transport difficulties in Budapest. As a result, the games of the first round started with a 20-minute delay and the games of the second round with a 10-minute delay. Journalist Vlad Ghita wrote from his X account that it was "unclear whether the shuttle buses are to be blamed, or whether the delegations ran late". Magnus Carlsen arrived ten minutes late for his game against Colombian grandmaster Roberto Garcia Pantoja in the third round as he had been travelling by bike in the rain, rushing to the venue and was confused about the entrance. Carlsen thought that he had forfeited the game before he arrived to the venue, but the games of the third round had already started with a delay, so he had enough time to avoid forfeit thanks to Chess.com photographer Maria Emelianova who showed him a shortcut to the playing hall. Following the game, he commented that he was staying in a different hotel from the others and was supposed to be picked up by them. However, he was suddenly informed that the traffic was horrible and they would arrive later, so he decided that biking to the venue might be faster than travelling by car.

=== Detection of disallowed devices ===
A fair-play check in the match between Lebanon and Egypt in the third round of the Open event detected a SIM card in Egypt's Sameh Sadek. Consequently, his win against Antoine Kassis was reversed as the SIM card was a disallowed electronic device according to the anti-cheating measures at the Olympiad. A disallowed device was detected in the match between Bosnia and Herzegovina and Thailand in the fourth round of the Open event, in which Dejan Marjanović initially lost his game against Tinnakrit Arunnuntapanich, but the score was reversed after the anti-cheating control had been performed. In the same round, an unused SIM card was found in the wallet of seven-time Argentine Champion Diego Flores in a fair-play check following his win in Argentina's 3½–½ victory over Bolivia, so his win was turned into a loss. However, the appeal by his federation and captain Robert Hungaski was accepted, and the result was reversed again.

=== Boycotts of Israel ===
In the match between Israel and Bangladesh in the tenth round in the Open event, Bangladeshi grandmaster Enamul Hossain forfeited his game against Tamir Nabaty. He announced his boycott in a post from his Facebook profile and complained about Israel's participation due to the ongoing conflict with Palestine by referring to the non-participation of Russia and Belarus. The Swiss system paired Israel and Iran to play in the final round of the Women's event. However, as Iran's government refuses to recognize the nation of Israel, the Iranian team decided not to play. The arbiters fixed the score to 4–0 in Israel's favour after the game's default times were finished. Israel's top-board player Marsel Efroimski said that it "was a shame that politics is mixed with sports". Chess journalist Leon Watson commented that the problem with Iran was a big reason why chess was out of the Olympic movement until 1995. He called on FIDE to take an action.
