= FHE =

FHE may refer to:

- European Humanist Federation (French: Fédération Humaniste Européenne)
- Family Home Entertainment, an American home-video distributor
- Family Home Evening, a custom among Mormon families
- Forest Hills Eastern High School, in Ada, Michigan, United States
- Fully homomorphic encryption
- Haitian Chess Federation (French: Fédération Haïtienne des Echecs)
- Hello (airline), a Swiss airline
- First Haydn Edition; see List of string quartets by Joseph Haydn
- Flexible Hybrid Electronics; see Flexible electronics
