= Gajadin =

Gajadin is a Surinamese surname. Notable people with the surname include:

- Chitra Gajadin (born 1954), Surinamese author
- Dewperkash Gajadin (born 1961), Surinamese chess master
