= Gaguik Oganessian =

Armenian chess player (1947–2015)

Personal information
- Born: April 21, 1947 Yerevan, Armenian SSR, Soviet Union
- Died: June 27, 2015 (aged 68) Oslo, Norway

Chess career
- Country: Armenia
- Title: FIDE Master (1999)
- Peak rating: 2200 (July 1999)

Gaguik Hovhannes Oganessian (Armenian: Գագիկ Հովհաննեսի Հովհաննիսյան; 21 April 1947 – 27 June 2015) (Pronunciation 'Gagik Hov(h)anisyan') was an Armenian chess player, chess official, journalist and writer. Born in Yerevan, Armenia) he was awarded the title of FIDE International Organizer in 1996 and served as president of FIDE Zone 1.5, chairman of FIDE Chess Information, Publication and Statistics Committee (CHIPS), member of the FIDE Executive Board, general secretary of the Armenian Chess Federation. Oganessian won the 4th World Amateur Chess Championship, held along the 1998/99 Hastings International Chess Congress, and as a result he was awarded the title FIDE Master.

Gaguik Oganessian graduated from the Journalism Department of the Philological Faculty of Yerevan State University in 1968. Three years later, he became associate professor at the same department. In 1972, Gaguik Oganessian founded the magazine Chess in Armenia, of which he was also editor-in-chief. He was author of 51 chess books, and his magazine's name in armenian was "Շախմատային Հայաստան" (Shakhmatayin Hayastan).

In 2007 then-president of Armenia Robert Kocharian handed him a Governmental Award. In the same year Kirsan Ilyumzhinov rewarded him with FIDE Golden Sign for the "feverish activity in the chess field."

Gaguik Oganessian was fond of traveling, especially around Europe.

Gaguik Oganessian died in Oslo, Norway on June 27, 2015.
