= Jack Mizzi =

Maltese chess player (born 2006)

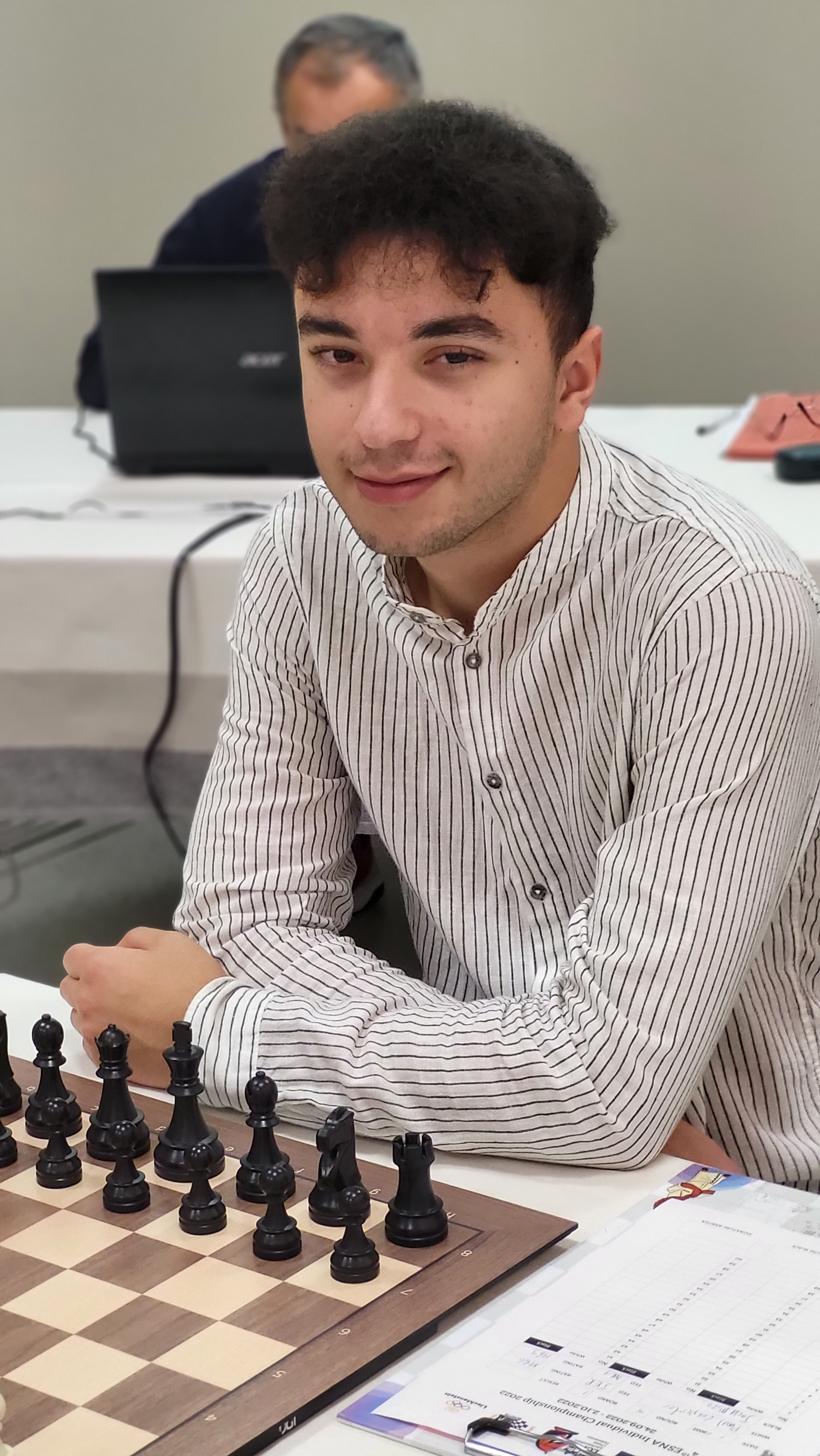
- Jack Mizzi in 2022

Personal information
- Born: 17 May 2006 (age 20)

Chess career
- Country: Malta
- Title: Candidate Master (2023)
- Peak rating: 2227 (October 2026)

Jack Mizzi is a Maltese chess player. He is the 2024 Malta Chess Champion, the U-20 Junior Chess Champion, the National Rapid Chess Champion and the National Blitz Chess Champion in Malta. Mizzi is the youngest chess player to have won the Preliminaries in Malta at 13 years old. At 16 years old he became the youngest Maltese player to be awarded the Candidate Master title. He was called a chess "prodigy" by the online journal Malta Today in their short documentary about Mizzi. Mizzi participated in the World Youth Chess Championships in Romania 2022. In 2023 he set a new Malta chess record winning the Malta Blitz Championship with a perfect 9-0 score.

== Chess career ==
Mizzi started learning chess in 2016 at the age of 10. His debut in FIDE-rated competitions started in the Preliminaries 2017 where he obtained his initial ELO rating of 1478.

In 2017, he became the Malta U14 Rapid Junior Champion winning 5 out of 5 games and an ELO performance of 2068. Later that year, he represented Malta in the European Youth Chess Championship (EYCC), his first international tournament.

In 2018, he became the U14 Junior Champion for the second time. He participated in the Preliminaries 2018, placed third and qualified for the first time for the Candidates 2018, where he obtained 3 points. In Summer 2018, Mizzi (ELO 1575) represented Malta in the European Youth Chess Championships in Latvia, and obtained a win against the higher rated Davidov Lazar (ELO 1763) from Serbia.

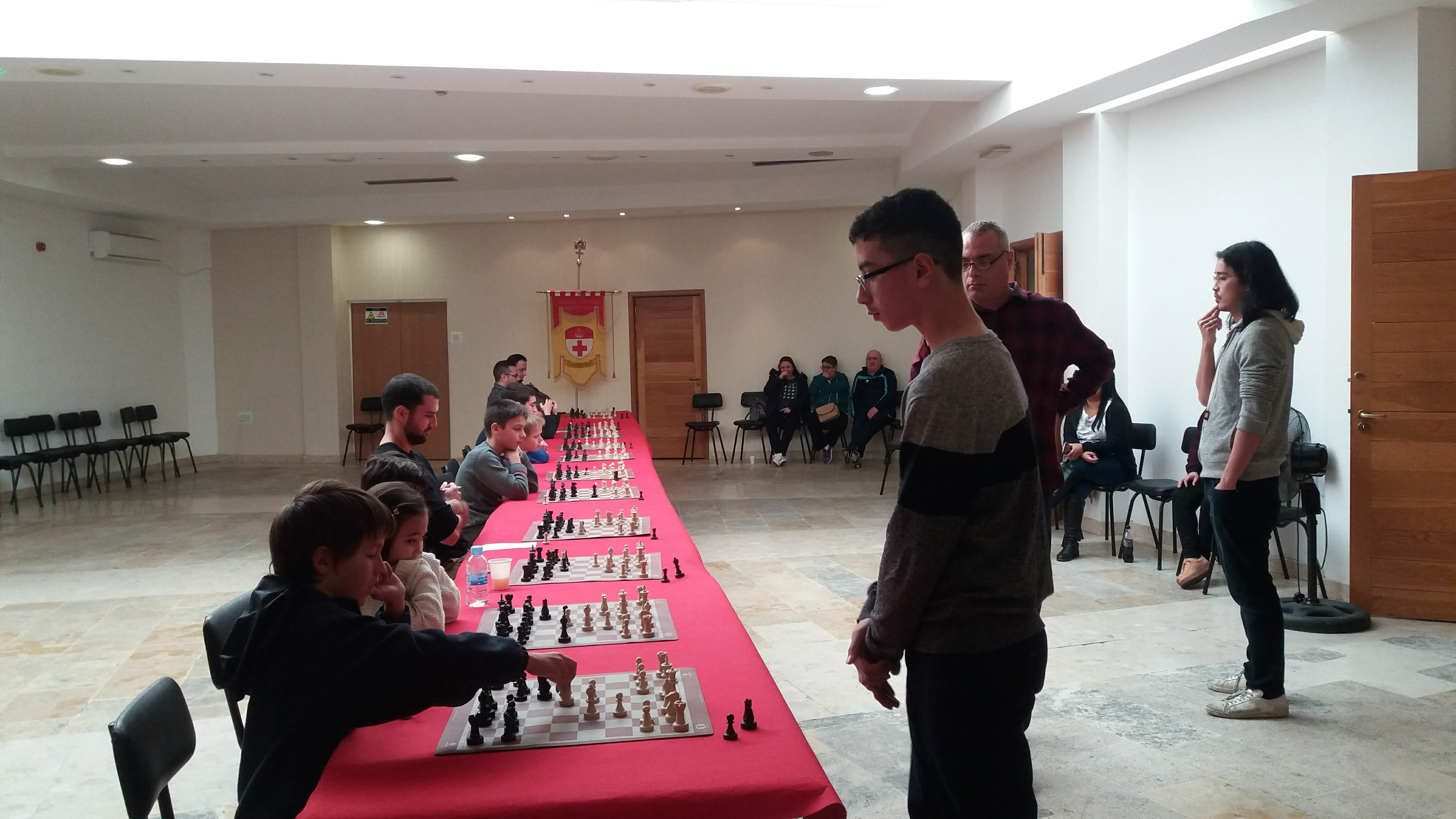
Jack Mizzi at the Simultaneous Exhibition at Birkirkara, 2018

In December 2018, at age 12, Mizzi played a 2.5-hour long simultaneous chess exhibition at the Birkirkara Local Council against 13 players and won all games. He placed second in the FIDE-rated Blitz tournament following the simultaneous chess exhibition.

=== Malta records ===
In 2019, Mizzi broke a Malta record as the youngest player to win the Preliminaries unbeaten with 5.5/7. This result qualified Mizzi to play in the Candidates 2019 where he placed 15th.

In March 2019, Jack played for the first time in a team tournament in Sicily in CIS 2019 and finished the tournament unbeaten with 4/5 points.

In the 2019 Junior Championships, Jack Mizzi tied for first place with Cosmin Alexa. Following tie-breaks, Mizzi was awarded the U-18 Junior Champion title.

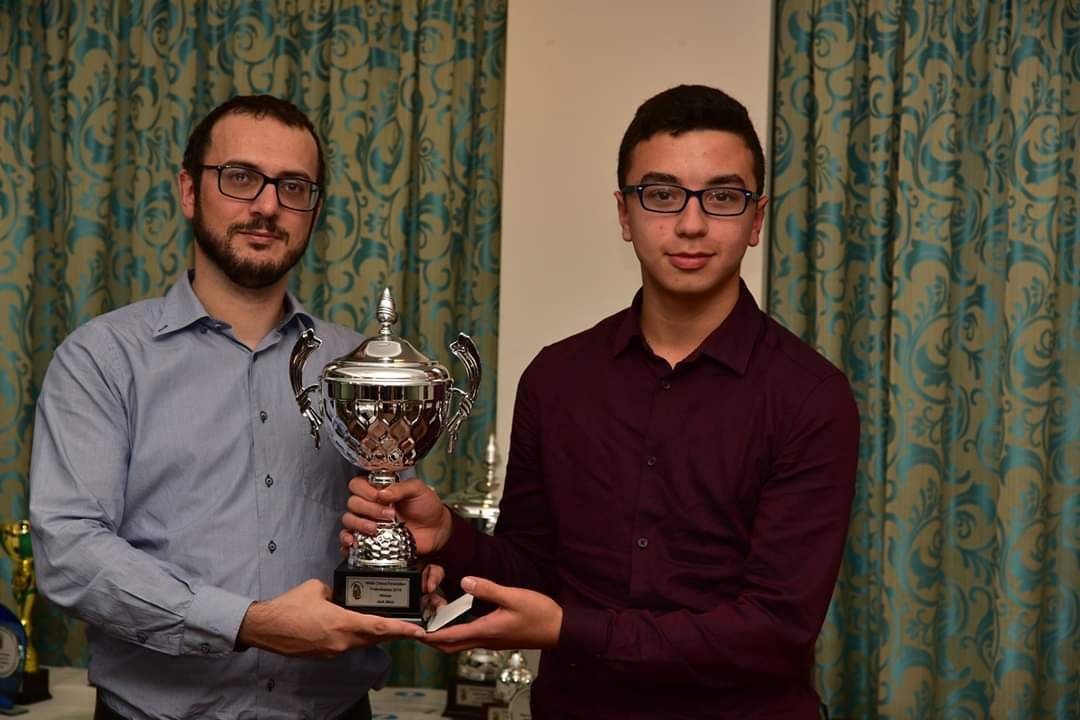
Jack Mizzi presented the trophy for winning the Preliminaries 2019 in December by Noel Grima

Mizzi participated in the European Youth Chess Championships 2019 in Bratislava with a win against Heldenbergh Nils from Belgium. Mizzi placed sixth in the Blitz tournament that was part of the event.

=== COVID pandemic era ===
In December 2019 through the start of January 2020, Mizzi played in his first open tournament overseas in Schwanberg, Austria where he obtained 4 draws. He played in the Blitz event and obtained a performance rating of 2074.

Mizzi participated for the final time in the Interschool chess tournament in March 2020 which he won with 7/7. After this tournament, the Malta Chess Federation (MCF) as well as the European Chess Union (ECU) and FIDE stopped the organisation of all on-the-board tournaments due to the Covid pandemic. In 2020, the Malta Junior championships and the European Youth Chess Championships were not held due to the pandemic.

To mitigate the situation FIDE, ECU and MCF organised a series of online tournaments. Mizzi represented Malta in Division 4 of the online FIDE Olympiads that were held for the first time ever in 2020. Jack obtained 6.5/9 and was Malta's top player. This resulted in Malta qualifying to Division 3 and Mizzi obtained 4.5/9.

In July 2020, the Malta Chess Federation organised the Candidates tournament over the board, in which Mizzi placed fifth.

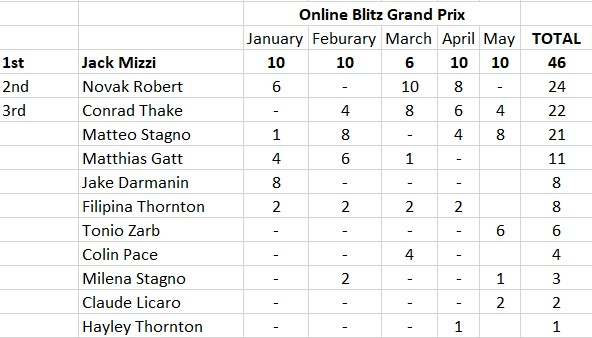
Final-Online-Blitz-Grand-Prix-Points

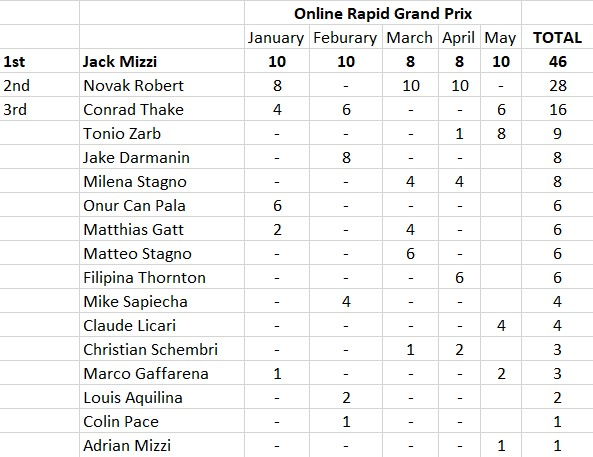
Final-Online-Rapid-Grand-Prix-Points

From January through May 2021, Mizzi played and won both the Blitz and Rapid Grand Prix, which consisted of a series of online tournaments organised by the Malta Chess Federation, as a substitute to on-the-board chess during the pandemic. The Malta Chess Federation praised Jack for his achievement.

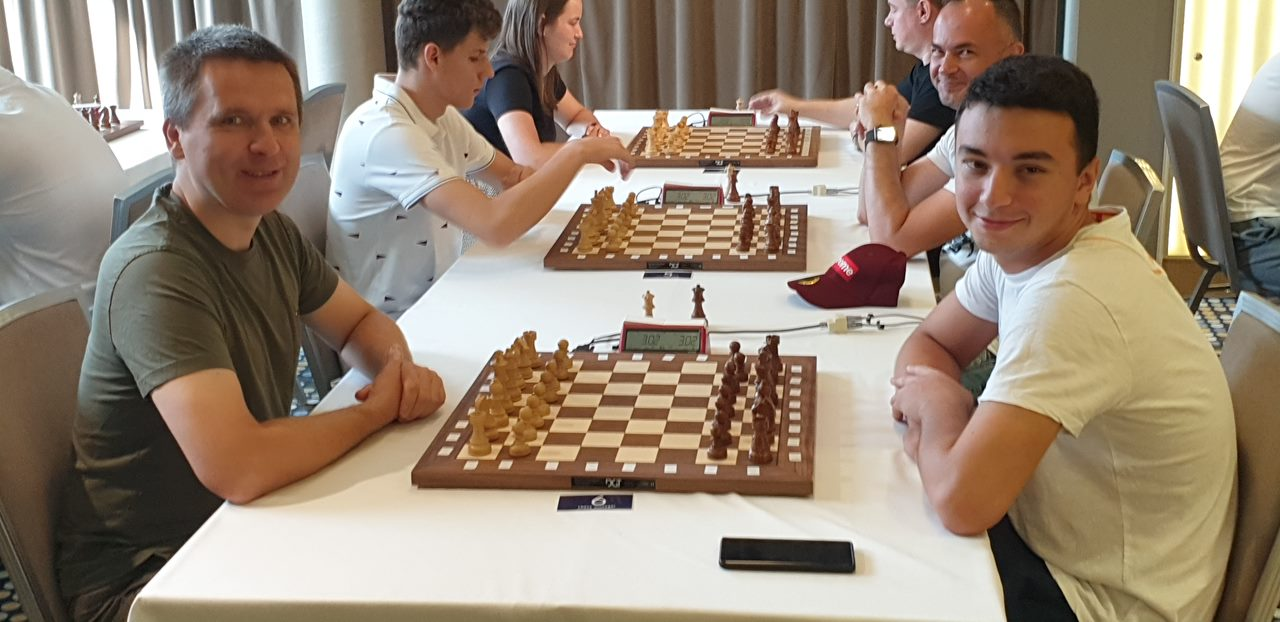
Jack plays GM Soćko in the Blitz tournament

In Summer 2021, some European chess Federations and organisations, started organising on-the-board tournaments. At the end of July 2021, Mizzi was invited to play in Poland in the Irene Warajomskiej Memorial. Despite a result of 5/9 with 1 loss, 2 wins and 6 draws, Jack's ELO rating suffered a reduction of 55. He also participated in the Blitz tournament where he faced GM Bartosz Soćko.

Mizzi was invited to play for ASD Pedone Isolano, a chess club based in Sicily, in the Italian Championship, CIS202I that was held in Sicily. He obtained three wins, suffered one loss, and in the last game obtained a draw.

=== Championships ===
The MCF held the Candidates 2021 in what was nicknamed a redux version after it had to be rescheduled because of the pandemic. Mizzi placed second in the tournament, and obtained a place in the final stage of the Championships that were held at the end of 2021.

Mizzi participated in the 2021 Junior Championships and won the U18 Junior Champion title unbeaten. He also played in the European Small Nations (ESNA) Blitz championship in Malta and drew against the World Women's Senior World Champion, WGM Berend Elvira.

Mizzi participated for the first time and placed third in the final stage of the championships that were held from December 2021 to January 2022.

In March 2022, at age 16, Mizzi became Malta's U20 Chess Junior Champion with 6.5/7. Later that year, he placed tenth in the Candidates 2022. He obtained three wins, one draw, and three losses.

Mizzi's win of the Junior Champion U-20 earned him a place in the Malta National Chess Team. In August 2022, Jack participated for the first time in the 44th Chess Olympiads that were held in Chennai and obtained 3 wins and a draw.

Mizzi played in the World Youth Chess Championship that were held in Mamaia, Romania during September 2022. He obtained 3 wins, 2 draws and 6 losses and suffered an ELO 54 loss.

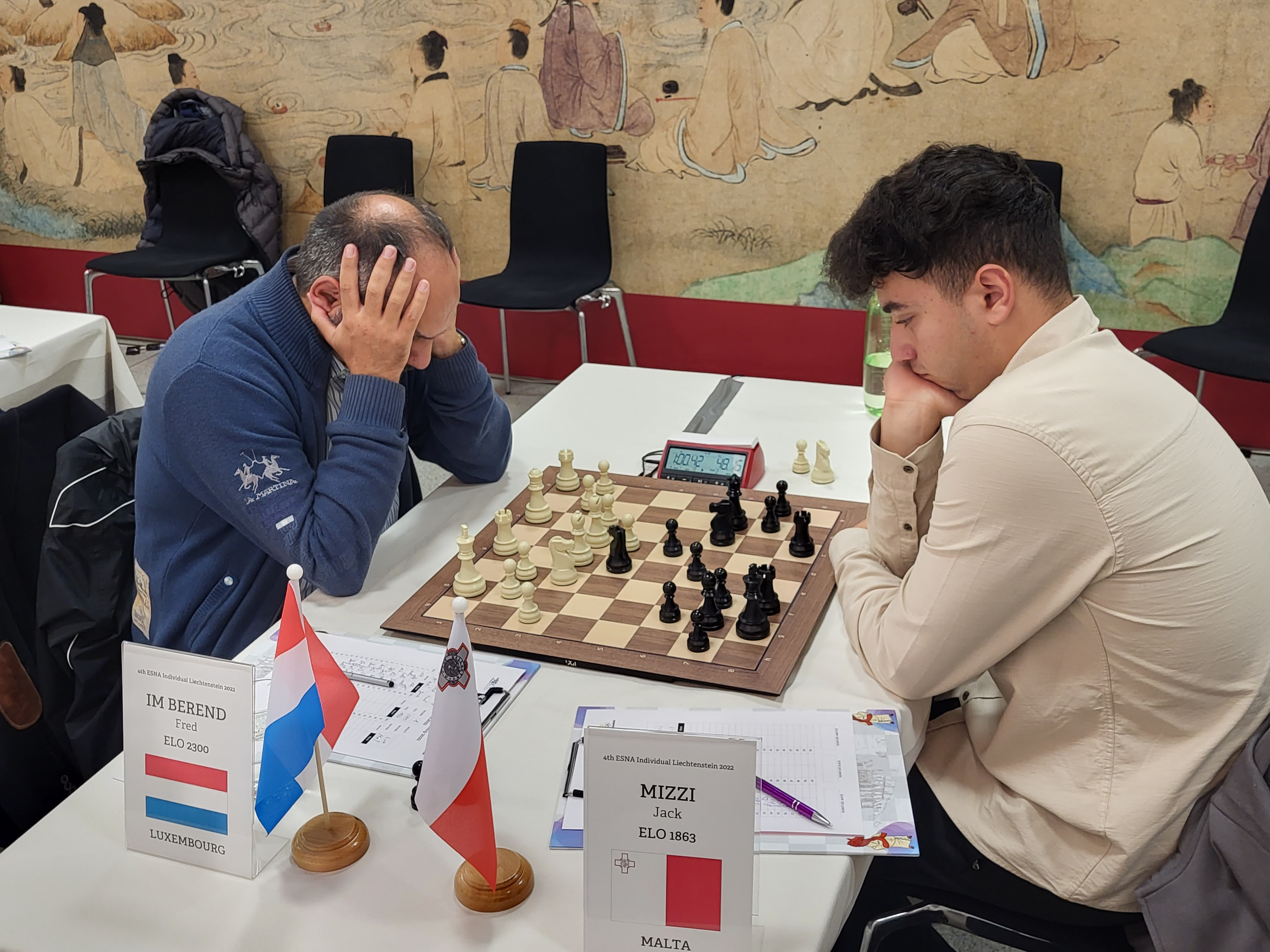
Jack won against IM Fred Berend in the European Small Nations Championship

In October 2022, Mizzi represented Malta in the 4th European Small Nations Championships that were held in Liechtenstein and finished in fifth place, gaining 144 ELO points. He obtained wins against IM Fred Berend (ELO 2300) and FM Michaelides Konstantinos (ELO 2304), the latter being Mizzi's strongest win according to Chessbase.

In October 2022 Mizzi participated in the World Amateur Chess Championship that were held in Malta and inaugurated by the FIDE President, Arkady Dvorkovich. Mizzi placed 4th in the Blitz tournament which was part of the World Amateur Chess Championships 2022. Playing in the U-2300 category of the main event of classical chess, he won three games, including a win against Alex Cherniak (ELO 2246), and obtained two draws. He suffered four losses, all against higher rated players.

At the start of the World Amateur Championships, Mizzi's ELO rating was 1808. Following this tournament, his ELO increased by 251 in one period resulting in a rating of 2059.

In December 2022, Mizzi became Malta's National Rapid Chess Champion and the National Blitz Chess Champion.

In March 2023, Mizzi won the Malta u-20 National Chess Junior Championship for the second consecutive year. In the same month he was awarded the Candidate Master title by FIDE and at 16 years Mizzi became the youngest ever Malta player to win this award.

In September 2023, Mizzi won the Malta Open 2023 Blitz tournament with 9 wins out of 9 games, setting a new Malta record for winning a chess championship with a perfect score, and was declared Malta's National Blitz Chess Champion for the second consecutive year.

In March 2024, Jack Mizzi won the Malta Junior Championship for the 3rd consecutive year.

Mizzi became the 89th Malta Champion in October 2024. ln December 2024, Mizzi won the Malta Blitz Chess Championship for the 3rd consecutive time.

== Awards and achievements ==
- Malta Blitz Champion
  November, 2024 awarded by Malta Chess Federation
- Malta Champion
  October, 2024 awarded by Malta Chess Federation
- Malta Junior Champion
  March, 2024 awarded by Malta Chess Federation
- Atlas Youth Athlete of the Month Award
  September, 2023 awarded by Malta Sports Journalist Association
- Malta Blitz Champion
  September, 2023 awarded by Malta Chess Federation
- Candidate Master – CM
  March 2023 awarded by FIDE
- Malta Junior Champion
  March, 2023 awarded by Malta Chess Federation
- Malta Junior Champion
  March, 2022 awarded by Malta Chess Federation
- Malta Blitz Champion
  December, 2022 awarded by Malta Chess Federation
- Malta Rapid Champion
  December, 2022 awarded by Malta Chess Federation
- Arena International Master – AIM
  December 2021 awarded by FIDE
- Arena Fide Master – AFM
  May 2021 awarded by FIDE
