= CTCA =

CTCA may refer to:

- Cancer Treatment Centers of America
- Chinese Taipei Chess Association
- Commission on Training Camp Activities
- Computed tomography coronary angiography (Cardiac CT scan)
- Channel-to-channel adapter, a device for connecting two computer systems
- Coton Club of America, a dog breed standard for Coton de Tulear
