= Carlos Dávila (disambiguation) =

Carlos Dávila (1887–1955) was a Chilean political figure and journalist.

Carlos Dávila may also refer to:

- Carlos Dávila López, Puerto Rican politician
- Carlos Dávila Dávila (1914–2010), Puerto Rico Supreme Court judge
- Carlos Dávila (chess player) (born 1971), Nicaraguan chess player
