= FPX =

FPX may refer to:

- .fpx, the FlashPix file extension
- Financial Process Exchange, the direct debit system of Malaysia
- FunPlus Phoenix, a Chinese professional esports organization based in Beijing
- Portuguese Chess Federation (Federação Portuguesa de Xadrez)
