= Pablo Cuéllar =

Panamanian chess player

Pablo Cuéllar (born 1952) is a former Panamanian chess player. He won the Panamanian Chess Championship in 1979. He participated in the 21st Chess Olympiad, where he scored (+5,=6,-9).
