= Nepalese Chess Championship =

The National Individual Chess Championship is organized by the Nepal Chess Federation- NCF and National Sports Association- NSC, and was first held in 1979. A National Women's Individual Chess Championship has also been held since 2008. From the year of 2009 National Club Team Chess Championship has been started.

== National Individual Chess Championship Winners ==
	Year	Place	Champion
1	2024	Sarlahi	Rajesh Kumar Bhagat
2	1980	Dhangadhi, Kailali	Bikash Man Lama/Bijay Sharma
3	1981	Hetauda	Laxmi Prasad Nakarmi
4	1982	Jumla	Bikash Man Lama
5	1983	Pokhara, Kaski	Gopal Prajapati
6	1984	Biratnagar, Morang	Gopal Prajapati
7	1985	Birganj, Parsa	Rabin Rajbhandari
8	1986	Lalitpur	Badrilal Nepali
9	1988	Kusma, Parbat	Naveen Tandukar
10	1992	Kathmandu	Bilamlal Shrestha
11	1997	Kathmandu	Punyaman Karmacharya
12	1999	Hetauda, Makwanpur	Badrilal Nepali
13	2004	Bhaktapur	Digesh Shankar Malla
14	2006	Kakarvitta, Jhapa	Keshav Shrestha
15	2008	Lalitpur	Surbir Lama
16	2009	Jawalakhel, Lalitpur	Badrilal Nepali
17	2012	Mahendranagar, Kanchanpur	Manish Hamal
18	2014	Banepa, Kavre	Keshav Shrestha
19	2016/05	Ilam	Bhupendra Niraula
20	2016/12	Dhankuta	Madan Krishna Kayastha
21	2019/04	Thakurdwara, Bardiya	Purusottam Chaulagain
22	2022/09	Gorkha Municipality, Gandaki	Kshitiz Bhandari
23	2023/04	Le Himalaya Hotel, Kathmandu	Rupesh Jaiswal
24	2024	Le Himalaya Hotel, Kathmandu	RAJAN Subedi
25	2025/06	Hotel Samana, Hetauda	Rupesh Jaiswal

	Year	Place	Champion
1	2008	Kathmandu	Monalisha Khamboo
2	2011	Kathmandu	Tara Ghale
3	2014	Banepa, Kavre	Bina Jaiswal
4	2016/05	Ilam	Sindira Joshi
5	2016/12	Dhankuta	Monalisha Khamboo
6	2019/04	Thakurdwara, Bardiya	Sujana Lohani
7	2022/09	Gorkha Municipality, Gandaki	Sujana Lohani
8	2023/04	Le Himalaya Hotel, Kathmandu	Sujana Lohani
