= Panamanian Chess Championship =

Chess competition in Panama

The Panamanian Chess Championship is the individual national chess championship of Panama. The first edition was played in 1945 and won by Rubén Darío Cabrera. It was originally a biennial event, and from 1945 to 1961 six championships were played, and from 1962 to 1971 eight championships. From 1972 to 1976, it was held annually, but the tournament of 1977 never finished because the beginning of a long schism in Panamanian chess. From 1978 to 1988, it was again held annually.

In 1982 and 1989, and from 1991 to 2004, two organizations held separate events, resulting in two champions, but in 1990 there was a single competition, and therefore one champion. In 2004 both federations made peace, and since 2005 then there has only been one championship each year. At the end of the 1970s, the first women's chess championship was started, and it became an annual event in 2002. Panama is the only country in the world where a father and daughter have been champions in the same year twice: 2004 and 2008. To show the rise of new isthmian chess, Panama took by the first time, in 2008 the [[Absolut Sub-Zonal 2.3.2 (CentroAmerican)]] by the hand of Jorge Baúles, first IM of Panama. In the youth categories, the signal (abs) show a champion in one big tournament with various categories at same time.

In 2010 there was no play because of official budget trouble with "Pandeportes", the government sports entity (which had three chiefs in only eleven months), and the tournament was played in the firsts months of 2011. In the final round of the 2014 tournament, two players were tied in all playoffs and were proclaimed champions. One is a foreigner, but changed his country flag as Panamanian in ratings.fide.com in March 2015, and is the fourth to win the title. Usually the Panamanian common considered overseas with over five years of residence, as one of their own.

== Champions ==
Year	Winner (men)	Winner (women)	Winner (Universitarian Champion)	(men Youth Champion)	(women Youth Champion)	Winner (men scholarship)	Winner (women scholarship)
1945	Rubén Darío Cabrera						
1947	Enrique Linares						
1953	Juan Evans						
1956	Francisco Denis						
1958	Francisco Pérez Arauz						
1960	Francisco Pérez Arauz						
1961	Francisco Pérez Arauz						
1962	Francisco Pérez Arauz						
1964	Francisco Pérez Arauz						
1965	Francisco Pérez Arauz						
1966	Francisco Pérez Arauz						
1967	Francisco Pérez Arauz						
1969	Francisco Pérez Arauz						
1970	Francisco Pérez Arauz						
1971	Francisco Pérez Arauz						
1972	Juan Ramón Martínez D'ettore						
1973	Juan Ramón Martínez D'ettore			Adrián Miranda (abs)			
1974	Bolívar Fábrega A.			Mario Hay (abs)			
1975	Bolívar Fábrega A.						
1976	Bolívar Fábrega A.		Bolívar Fábrega A.	Elio Ortíz (abs)		Jorge Lam (U17)	
1977			Bolívar Fábrega A.	César Concepción (U13)			
1978	Iván Saucedo						
1979	Pablo Cuéllar	Lidia Ferrer					
1980	Mario Hay			Agustín Cantilo-Paz (abs)			
1981	Blass Barría						
1982	Blass Barría , Alberto Lombana, Alberto Lombana (blitz)			Bolívar Conte Ponce (abs)			
1983	Nestor Sosa			José Guardiola (U13)			
1984	Blass Barría			Yasser Valdés (U13)			
1985	Jorge Luis Arosemena, Agustín Cantilo-Paz (blitz)		Agustín Cantilo-Paz	Tonci Korsano (abs), Carlos Tuñón (U13)		J. Wong (U17)	
1986	Elio Ortíz			Ludwig Martínez			
1987	Javier De León						
1988	Javier De León; Benjamin Rivera Silvera						
1989	Javier De León; Francisco Pérez Arauz						
1990	Blass Barría						Michelle Aizpurua Martinis
1991	Agustín Cantilo-Paz		Jorge Luis Arosemena				Michelle Aizpurua Martinis
1992					Michelle Aizpurua Martinis		Michelle Aizpurua Martinis
1993	Javier De León				Michelle Aizpurua Martinis		Michelle Aizpurua Martinis
1994	Mario Hay; Nestor Sosa		Gabriel Quintero Garzola		Michelle Aizpurua Martinis		Michelle Aizpurua Martinis
1995	Miguel Gamboa; Ricardo Hill				Michelle Aizpurua Martinis	Francisco Castroverde(U17)	Michelle Aizpurua Martinis
1996	Mario Hay			Héctor Díaz (abs)	Michelle Aizpurua Martinis	Luis Aquije (U17)	Michelle Aizpurua Martinis
1997	Mario Hay		Héctor Díaz	Luis A. Hidalgo(abs)/		Luis A. Hidalgo (U17)	Angelini Batista (U17)
1998	vacancy					Ramiro Rosas (U17)	Yolanda Villarreal (U17)
1999	Jorge Luis Arosemena					Luis A. Hidalgo (U17)	Amada Birbraguer (U17)
2000	Jorge Luis Arosemena			Jorge Sánchez(abs)		Luis Esquivel Golcher (U17)	
2001	Jorge Baúles; Walter Alvarez			Luis A. Hidalgo	Yaribeth González (abs)	Rancés Valdés (U17)	Raisa Barría (U17)
2002	Héctor Díaz	Raisa Barría		Jorge Baúles	Raisa Barría (abs)	Gilberto Madrid (U17)	Raisa Barría (U17)
2003	Mario Hay	Raisa Barría		Luis Esquivel Golcher (abs)		Gilberto Madrid (U17)	
2004	Jorge Luis Arosemena; Mario Hay	Betty Arosemena		Rances Valdés			
2005	Javier De León	Yaribeth González		Ramsés Chaves (U14), Alhan Carrera Dubois (U12), Giandanello Manzanares(U10)	Angélica Lam (U14)		
2006	Mario Hay	Betty Arosemena				Luis Pan (U17)	Alba Muñoz (U17)
2007	Jorge Luis Arosemena	Yaribeth González		Carlos Neira (abs)			
2008	Jorge Luis Arosemena	Betty Arosemena		Patrick Aizpurua (abs, U16), Antonio Daniels (U20), Efraim Espinosa (U18), José Battikh (U14), Alexei Tapia O. (U12), Jorge Ocaña (U10), José Chaluja Prieto (U8)	Alba Muñoz (abs, U18), Karen Quintero (U20), Angélica Lam (U16), Cristy Young (U14), Katherine Young (U12)	Patrick Aizpurua (U17)	Alba Muñoz (U17)
2009	Jorge Baúles	Raisa Barría		José Pittí (U20-U18), Patrick Aizpurua (U16), José Battikh (U14), Alexei Tapia O.(U12), José Chaluja (U10)	Alba Muñoz (abs, U16), Cristina Arosemena (U18), Dalia Arosemena (U14), Katherine Young (U12), Liann Sun (U10)	Alhan Carrera Dubois (U17)	Kristy Young (U17)
2010	vacancy	vacancy		Alexei Tapia O. (U14), Adrián Fuentes (U12), Brandon Carrasco (U10), Miguel Machaj (U8)	Katryn Young (U14), Lyann Sun (U12)	Ramses Chaves (U17)	Cristina Arosemena (U17)
2011	Rancés Valdés	Raisa Barría		vacancy		Patrick Aizpurua (17), José Chaluja U12)	Cristina Arosemena (U17), Yeisy Hardy Robinson(U12)
2012	Jorge Baúles	Yaribeth González		vacancy		Alexei Tapia O. (U17)	Junny Zhang Ng (U17)
2013	Jorge Baúles			Alexei Tapia O.(abs)	Kathryn Young (abs)	Robert Sun (U12), Alexei Tapia (U17)	
2014	Efrén Ramos/Alexei Tapia O.	Yaribeth González	Patrick Aizpurúa	Ruben Ulloa (abs, U20), Alexei Tapia O. (U18), Brandon Carrasco (U16),	Kathia Laffaurie(absolute, U20), Fátima Delgado (U16)	Alexei Tapia (U17)	
2015	Jorge Baúles, Jorge Baúles (blitz)	Yaribeth González	Patrick Aizpurua	Alex Delgado (abs, U20), Adrian Fuentes (U18), Edilberto Del Cid (16)	Noelys Alvarado (abs, U20), Junny Zhang (U18), Fátima Delgado (U15)	Robert Sun Chin (U15), Reynaldo Sanjur González (U12)	Noelys Batista Santamaria (U12), Fatima Pineda Liu (U15)
2016	Jorge Baúles	Raisa Barría				Robert Sun Chin (U17), André Mendez Machado (U12)	Fátima Delgado Rosas (U17), Cindy Alfredo Lucas (U12)
2017	Jorge Baúles	Raisa Barría		Robert Sun Chin (abs, U16), Alexei Tapia O. (U20), José A. Chaluja Prieto (U18), Jose A. Delgado Rosas (U14)	Carolina Hau (U20), Yeisy Hardy Robinson (abs, U16), Marianna M. Bonilla Rosas (U14)	Alex J. Escobar De Gracia (U12)	Ania N. Rosales Espinosa (U12)
2018	Roberto Carlos Sánchez Álvarez	Raisa Barría		Robert Sun Chin (abs)	Fátima Delgado Rosas (abs)	Robert Sun Chin (U17)	Fátima Delgado Rosas
2019	Jorge Baúles	Raisa Barría		Aldair Ferreira Araujo (U20), Robert Sun Chin (U18), Kendry Finlay (U16), Luis Gonzalez De la Guardia (U14), Andre Mendez Machado (U12), Bruno Rodriguez (U10), Manuel Ignacio Gomes (U8)	Any Zhang Ng (U20), Yeisy Hardy Robinson (U18), Lourdes Vasquez Jaen (U16), Salma Gomez Morales (U14), Mariana Del Carmen Navarro (U12), Ashley Castillo (U10), Fatima Mendez Machado (U8)		
2020	Roberto Carlos Sánchez Álvarez	Raisa Barría					
2021	Roberto Carlos Sánchez Álvarez	Raisa Melissa Barría Baker					
2022	Roberto Carlos Sánchez Álvarez	Lourdes Lorena Vásquez Jaén		Nicolás Arturo Batista Rosas (U18),Arno Fascio Outerbridge (U16),Samir Camargo Silva (U14),Adrián Ignacio Cortés Franco (U12),Iván Said Herrera Gómez (U10),Edgar Said Duarte González (U08)			
2023	Roberto Carlos Sánchez Álvarez	Raisa Melissa Barría Baker					
