= Wilfred Attard =

Maltese chess player

Wilfrid Attard
Personal information
- Born: 5 January 1922 Malta
- Died: 23 November 2001 Malta

Chess career
- Country: Malta

Wilfrid Godfrey Attard (5 January 1922 – 23 November 2001) was a Maltese chess player and administrator, twelve-times Maltese Chess Championship winner (1946, 1950, 1953, 1954, 1957, 1958, 1959, 1960, 1961, 1963, 1964, 1980).

== Biography ==
Wilfrid Attard was twelve-time Maltese Chess Championship winner (1946, 1950, 1953, 1954, 1957–1961, 1963, 1964 and 1980). Also he was silver medalist of the 1996 Malta Chess Championship.

Wilfrid Attard played for Malta in the Chess Olympiads:

- In 1972, at third board in the 20th Chess Olympiad in Skopje (+7, =2, -5),
- In 1974, at second board in the 21st Chess Olympiad in Nice (+6, =6, -8),
- In 1980, at first board in the 24th Chess Olympiad in La Valletta (+2, =3, -5).

In 1960, 1964 and 1981 Wilfrid Attard represented Malta in World Chess Championships European Zonal tournaments. In the 1960 tournament, he defeated one of the winners of the tournament, Arturo Pomar.

Wilfrid Attard served as President of the Malta Chess Federation.
