= Fy Antenaina Rakotomaharo =

Malagasy chess player (born 1999)

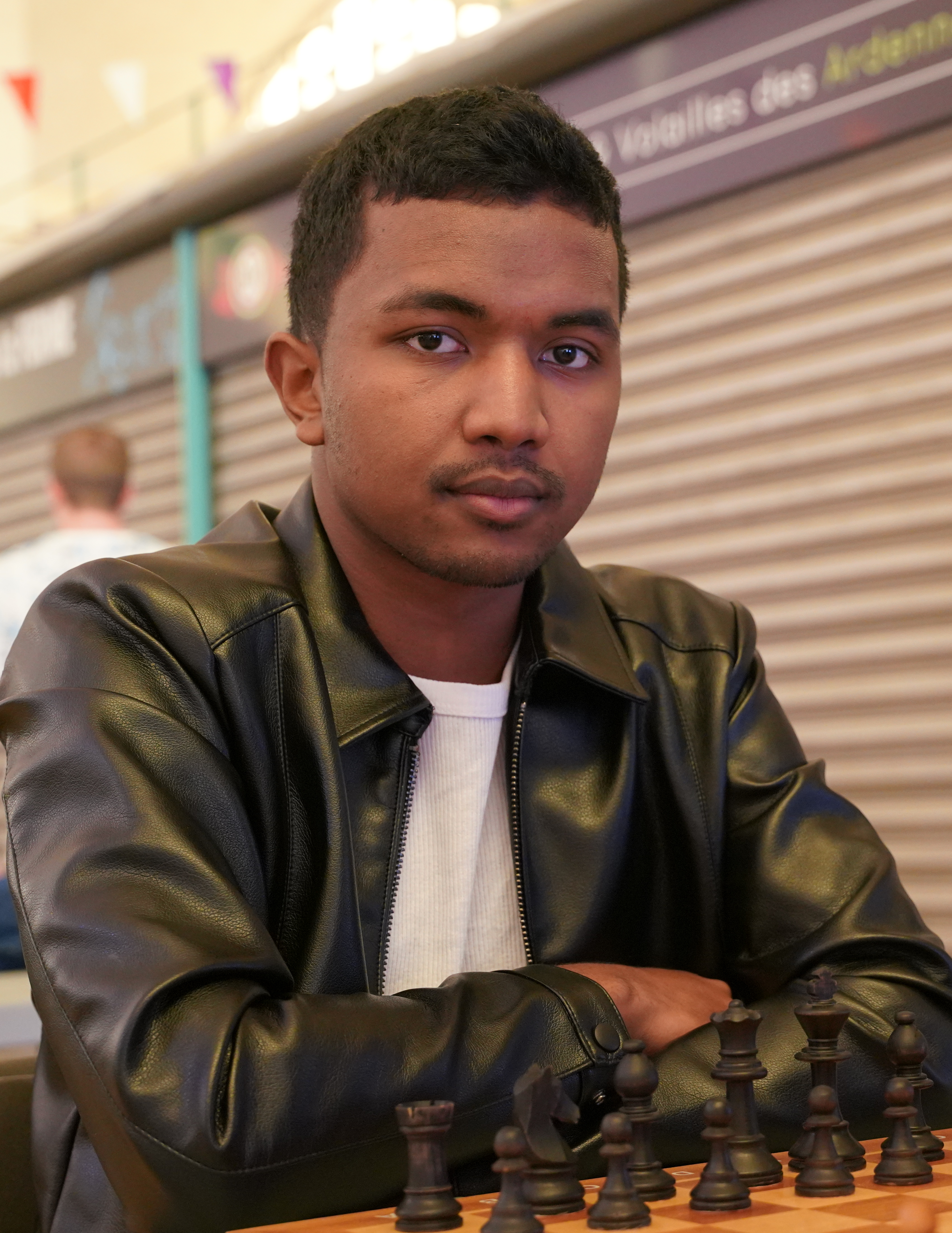

Personal information
- Born: September 20, 1999 (age 26)

Chess career
- Country: Madagascar
- Title: International Master (2017)
- FIDE rating: 2426 (July 2026)
- Peak rating: 2492 (September 2022)

Fy Antenaina Rakotomaharo (born 1999) is a Malagasy chess player. He was awarded the title of International Master by FIDE in 2017.

== Career ==
Rakotomaharo won the Malagasy Chess Championship in 2013 and 2018. In May 2019, he won the FIDE Zone 7.3 zonal, qualifying to play in the Chess World Cup 2019 in September, where he was defeated by Shakhriyar Mamedyarov in the first round. He won the 2020 French university championship held in Nancy.
