= Kosovar Chess Championship =

Annual chess tournament in Kosovo

The Kosovar Chess Championship is organized by the Kosovo Chess Federation, which was established in 1990 and joined FIDE in 2016. With the exception of a hiatus in 1998, the tournament has been held annually since 1991.

== Winners ==
Year	Champion
1991	Alajdin Bejta
1992	Armend Budima
1993	Bajram Bujupi
1994	Naim Sahitaj
1995	Halim Halimi
1996	Hazis Koxha
1997	Naim Sahitaj
1999	Ilirjan Jupa
2000	Naim Sahitaj
2001	Naim Sahitaj
2002	Murtez Hondozi
2003	Sabahudin Kollari
2004	Besnik Aliu
2005	Përparim Makolli
2006	Përparim Makolli
2007	Ramadan Ajvazi
2008	Bedri Sadiku
2009	Naim Sahitaj
2010	Naim Sahitaj
2011	Naim Sahitaj
2012	Përparim Makolli
2013	Nderim Saraçi
2014	Nderim Saraçi
2015	Nderim Saraçi
2016	Nderim Saraçi
2017	Nderim Saraçi
2020	Korab Saraci
2024	Nderim Saraçi
