= Malta Chess Federation =

Malta governing body for chess competition

- Abbreviation: MCF
- Formation: 1923
- Headquarters: Tal-Ħandaq, Malta
- Region served: Malta
- Members: 500+ (2022)
- President: Duncan Vella
- Vice President: Noel Grima
- General Secretary: Jake Darmanin
- Treasurer: Nina Thornton
- Affiliations: FIDE European Chess Union
- Staff: 7
- Website: chessmalta.com

The Malta Chess Federation (also known as MCF and in Maltese: Il-Federazzjoni Maltija taċ-Ċess) is the governing body for chess competition in Malta and represents Malta in FIDE, the World Chess Federation. MCF does not administer an official national rating system but relies on the International Elo rating system administered by FIDE.

The MCF awards national titles, including the Malta Open Chess Champion, the Malta Junior Chess Champion, the Malta Rapid Chess Champion and the Malta Blitz Champion. The MCF was founded and incorporated in Malta in 1923. It is a non-profit organization headquartered in Ħandaq, Qormi, Malta.

== History ==
According to the MCF, chess in Malta started in the 1800s. In the 1880s, Leone Benjacar, a chess enthusiast, recorded his first chess problems and chess articles. Other Maltese players such as Monreale, Marich, Ghio, Preziosi, Cesareo and Monpalap Depiro started to meet and play matches and tournaments of which games are still in existence. It is believed that Benjacar had set up a chess club in Valletta during the period 1880 and 1893.

Erin Serracino Inglott set up the Malta Chess Association in 1923, building up on the work of Benjacar.

MCF became a member of FIDE in 1959 following Max Euwe's recommendation. MCF organised the 24th Chess Olympiad in 1980.

== National Championships ==
The MCF is responsible for organising the Maltese Chess Championships. These consist of the Open Championships, the Rapid Championships, the Blitz Championships and the Junior Championships.

=== Covid Pandemic ===
In 2021, the MCF organised a Blitz and Rapid Gran Prix that were played online. This is because chess on the board was banned as a result of the COVID-19 pandemic. Both the Blitz Gran Prix and the Rapid Gran Prix were won by Jack Mizzi.
