= Henry Camilleri =

Maltese chess player (1933–2015)

Personal information
- Born: 21 February 1933 Marsa, Malta
- Died: 2015

Chess career
- Country: Malta
- Title: International Correspondence Chess Master (1999); Candidate Master (2011)

Henry Camilleri (21 February 1933 – 2015) was a Maltese chess International Correspondence Chess Master (IM), eighteen-times Maltese Chess Championship winner: first in 1965 and last in 2005, at the age of 72. His son Hans Camilleri isalso good in chess.

== Biography ==
Henry Camilleri won his first championship in 1950, at the age of 17. It was the Malta Junior Chess Championship.

Henry Camilleri won his first Maltese Chess Championship title in 1965. He won the Maltese Chess Championship eight consecutive times between 1965 and 1972, which is a record in this championship. He then won a title in 1974, then another four consecutive times from 1976 to 1979 inclusive. In 1981, he was again titled but shared his title with Joseph Gauci. Later, he will again win this title twice in a row, in 1989 and 1990. He will win his 17th title in 1999, interrupting the series of six consecutive titles of Timothy Mifsud. Finally, in 2005, he won his last title at the age of 72. This was a world record forty years after his first title, which was only broken in 2016 by Paul Garbett when he won the New Zealand Open Championship 42 years after his first win in 1973/74.

Henry Camilleri played for Malta in the Chess Olympiads:

- In 1960, at first board in the 14th Chess Olympiad in Leipzig (+3, =5, -11),
- In 1970, at first board in the 19th Chess Olympiad in Siegen (+8, =5, -3),
- In 1972, at first board in the 20th Chess Olympiad in Skopje (+5, =6, -9),
- In 1974, at first board in the 21st Chess Olympiad in Nice (+6, =6, -8),
- In 1980, at second board in the 24th Chess Olympiad in La Valletta (+3, =1, -6),
- In 1982, at first board in the 25th Chess Olympiad in Lucerne (+3, =4, -6),
- In 1984, at second board in the 26th Chess Olympiad in Thessaloniki (+3, =3, -5),
- In 1986, at second board in the 27th Chess Olympiad in Dubai (+3, =6, -4),
- In 1990, at first board in the 29th Chess Olympiad in Novi Sad (+2, =4, -6),
- In 1994, at second board in the 31st Chess Olympiad in Moscow (+1, =6, -4),
- In 1996, at second board in the 32nd Chess Olympiad in Yerevan (+4, =4, -3),
- In 2000, at second board in the 34th Chess Olympiad in Istanbul (+2, =6, -3),
- In 2002, at second board in the 35th Chess Olympiad in Bled (+2, =3, -4).

In 1967, 1969, 1978 and 1990 Henry Camilleri represented Malta in World Chess Championships European Zonal tournaments. He invariably took the last places, but regularly took points from famous chess players. In the 1967 tournament he defeated Nikolay Minev and Victor Ciocâltea, in the 1969 tournament he made draws with Lajos Portisch, László Bárczay and Robert Hartoch.

Henry Camilleri was the first Maltese chess player to achieve an international rating, 2250 in the July 1972 list. He was awarded the ICCF International Master (IM) title in 1998 and the FIDE Candidate Master (CM) title in 2011.
