= Latvian Chess Federation =

Sports governing body in Latvia

- Sport: Chess
- Jurisdiction: Latvia
- Abbreviation: LŠF
- Founded: 2010
- Affiliation: FIDE
- Regional affiliation: European Chess Union
- President: Toms Kalniņš

Official website
- www.sahafederacija.lv
- (Latvia)

The Latvian Chess Federation (abbreviation LŠF; Latvian: Latvijas Šaha federācija) is the national federation of Chess in Latvia. It promotes chess in Latvia and represents Latvian players internationally as a FIDE member organization. It organizes the Latvian Chess Championship. It is a member of the Latvian Sports Federations Council.

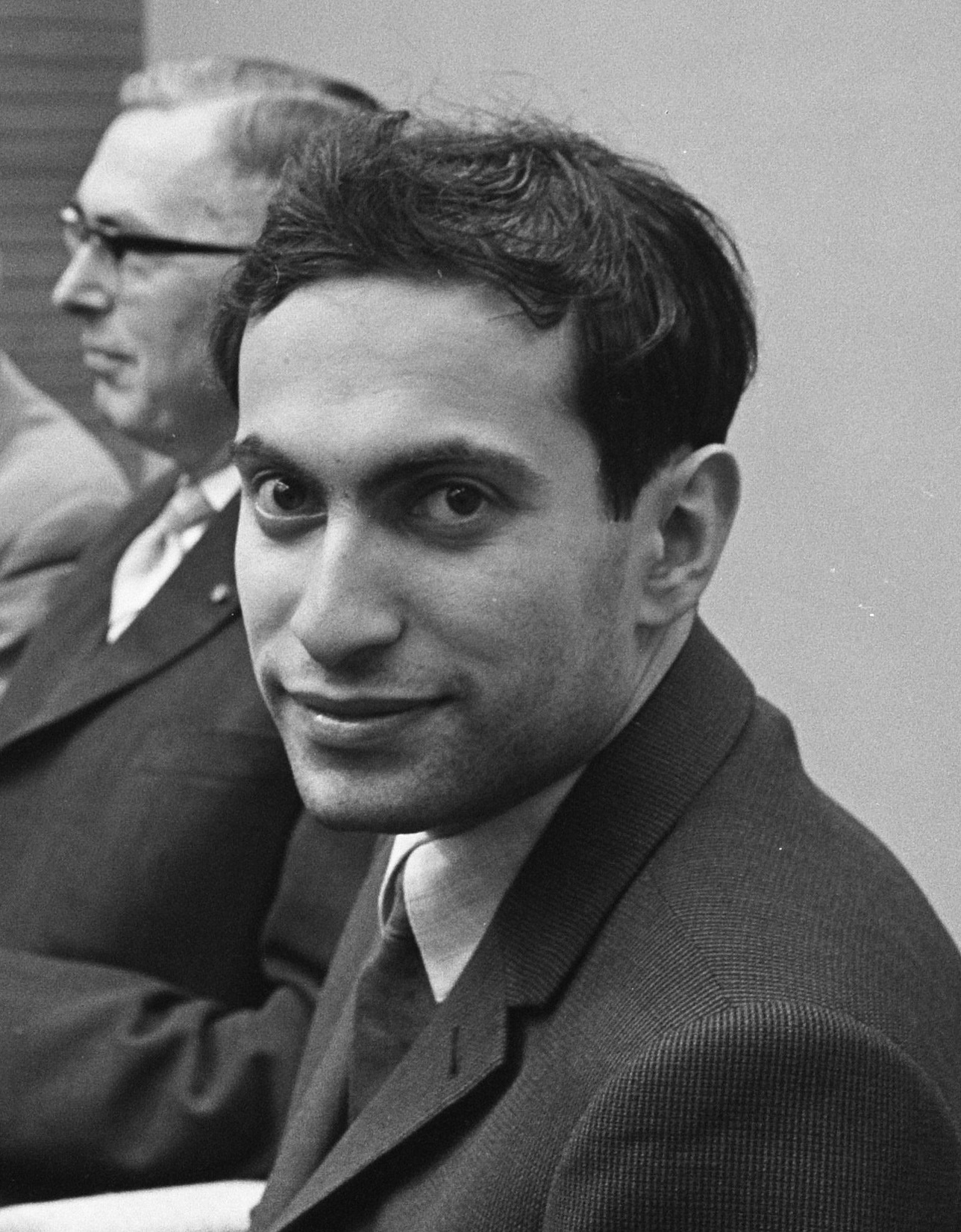
Mikhail Tal, regarded as one of the strongest chess players from Latvia and the world

== History ==
The organization was first conceived as the Latvian Chess Union in 1924, and was one of the founding member organizations of FIDE in Paris. The Latvian Chess Union was suspended after the Soviet occupation of Latvia in 1940. The Latvian Chess Federation was established in 1951 under the Latvian SSR section of the USSR Chess Federation. Upon Latvia's independence in 1991 the Latvian Chess Union was reestablished, but due to financial problems in 2010 it was restructured into the modern Latvian Chess Federation.
