= Croatian Chess Federation =

Croatian chess governing body

- Formation: 1912
- Region served: Croatia
- Affiliations: FIDE, European Chess Union
- Website: hrvatski-sahovski-savez.hr

The Croatian Chess Federation (Croatian: Hrvatski šahovski savez, HŠS) is a chess governing body in Croatia. It is based in Zagreb. The federation was formed on 12 May 1912, and was accepted into FIDE, the World Chess Federation, in 1992.

The HŠS has 200 member clubs across the country. It also organizes:

- Croatian Chess Championship
- Croatian Women's Chess Championship
- Croatian Junior Chess Championship
- Croatian Cadet Chess Championship
- Croatian Team Chess Championship
- Croatian Cup
