= Roberto Carlos Sanchez Alvarez =

Panamanian chess player (born 1987)

Personal information
- Born: January 29, 1987 (age 39) Ciego de Ávila, Cuba

Chess career
- Country: Cuba (until 2017); Panama (since 2017)
- Title: International Master (2019)
- Peak rating: 2449 (January 2023)

Roberto Carlos Sanchez Alvarez (born 1987) is a Cuban-Panamanian chess International Master. He participated in the Chess World Cup 2023 where he was knocked out by Eltaj Safarli in the first round with a 3–1 loss.
