= Malagasy Chess Championship =

The Malagasy Chess Championship is organized by the Madagascar Chess Federation (FMJE; French: Fédération Malagasy du Jeu d'Échecs), which was initially founded in 1970 and most recently revived in 2008 after a decade of inactivity. The national championship was first held in 1994. There is also a separate Malagasy Women's Chess Championship which was first held in 2009.

== National championship winners ==
Year	Champion
1994	Jean Paul Randrianasolo
1995	Jean Loup Foucault
1996	Jean Loup Foucault
1997	Lalanirina Randriantseheno
1998	Liva Rabenandrasana
2008	Alain Ranaivoharisoa
2009	Alain Ranaivoharisoa
2010	Alain Ranaivoharisoa
2011	Alain Ranaivoharisoa
2012	Faniry Rajaonarison
2013	Fy Antenaina Rakotomaharo
2014	Miora Andriamasoandro
2015	Faniry Rajaonarison
2016	Faniry Rajaonarison
2017	Faniry Rajaonarison
2018	Fy Antenaina Rakotomaharo
2019	Heritiana Andrianiaina
2020	COVID period
2021	Heritiana Andrianiaina
2022	Heritiana Andrianiaina
2023	Miora Randriamasoandro
2024	Toavina Razanadrakotoarisoa
2025	Heritiana Andrianiaina

== Women's championship winners ==
Year	Champion
2009	Irma Randrianasolo
2010	Johanne Ramaniraka
2011	Sabine Ravelomanana
2012	Sabine Ravelomanana
2013	Christine Razafindrabiaza
2014	Faratiana Raharimanana
2015	Sabine Ravelomanana
2017	Sabine Ravelomanana
2018	Irina Andriantsiferana, Christine Razafindrabiaza
2019	Christine Razafindrabiaza
