= Carlos Dávila (chess player) =

Nicaraguan chess player

Carlos Dávila López
Personal information
- Born: 5 March 1971 (age 55) Managua, Nicaragua

Chess career
- Country: Nicaragua
- Title: International Master (2003)
- Peak rating: 2415 (January 1998)

Carlos Dávila (born 5 March 1971) is a Nicaraguan chess International Master (IM) (2003), seven-times Nicaraguan Chess Championship winner, and Chess Olympiad Individual Gold Medallist (1994).

== Biography ==
Carlos Dávila won the Nicaraguan Chess Championship seven times, in 1994,1995, 1996, 1998, 2005, 2006, and 2007. He has also won two international chess tournaments in Nicaragua, at Managua (2003), and Granada (2012). In 2013, in Havana he shared 1st place in Capablanca Memorial Premier tournament.

Carlos Dávila played for Nicaragua in the Chess Olympiads:

- In 1994, at second board in the 31st Chess Olympiad in Moscow (+10, =2, -2) and Won individual Gold Medal,
- In 1996, at first board in the 32nd Chess Olympiad in Yerevan (+8, =5, -1),
- In 2002, at first board in the 35th Chess Olympiad in Bled (+6, =6, -2),
- In 2004, at second board in the 36th Chess Olympiad in Calvià (+8, =4, -2),
- In 2006, at first board in the 37th Chess Olympiad in Turin (+4, =3, -6).

In 2003, he was awarded the FIDE International Master (IM) title.
