= Nderim Saraçi =

Kosovan chess player (born 1996)

Personal information
- Born: September 16, 1996 (age 30) Mitrovica, Kosovo

Chess career
- Country: Kosovo
- Title: International Master (2018)
- FIDE rating: 2445 (October 2026)
- Peak rating: 2495 (July 2022)

Nderim Saraçi (born 1996) is a Kosovan chess player.

== Chess career ==
He was awarded the International master title in 2018 and the FIDE master title in 2016. He belongs to the SK 1912 Ludwigshafen club.

He won the open rapid Pristina chess tournament in 2019.

He drew 2nd- 4th place in the open rapid Adem Jashari chess tournament cup in 2019.
