= Nicaraguan Chess Championship =

The Nicaraguan Chess Championship is currently organized by Fenanic (Spanish: Federación Nacional de Ajedrez de Nicaragua), the national chess federation of Nicaragua. After the first championship was held as a match in 1956, subsequent editions have been held as tournaments in multiple categories, with the winner of the top category becoming the national champion.

== National championship winners ==
Year	National champion	Notes
1956	Julio Ramírez de Arellano	Arellano beat Gustavo Montalván in a series of seven games.
1958	Julio Ramírez de Arellano	
1959	Julio Ramírez de Arellano	
1960	Julio Ramírez de Arellano	
1961	Julio Ramírez de Arellano	
1962	Julio Ramírez de Arellano	
1964	Julio Ramírez de Arellano	
1965	Julio Ramírez de Arellano	
1966	Julio Ramírez de Arellano	
1967	Julio Ramírez de Arellano	
1968	Julio Ramírez de Arellano	
1969	Gustavo Jorge Aleman	
1970	Edmundo Dávila Castellón	
1971	Gustavo Jorge Aleman	
1972	Miguel Chávez	
1973	Narciso Salas Chávez	Benjamín Zapata was leading the tournament but was disqualified in the penultimate round for showing up to play while intoxicated.
1974	Carlos J. Lau	Lau finished third in the tournament, while Julio Ramírez de Arellano and Francisco Castillo Tamariz tied for first and began a playoff match for the title. When they protested that the chess clock they were using was not working properly, FENANIC disqualified them both and awarded the title to Lau.
1975	René Pilarte Tijerino	
1976	Francisco Castillo Tamariz	
1977–1980	–	Not held because of the Nicaraguan Revolution.
1981	Edmundo Dávila Castellón	Mexican IM Roberto Navarro won the tournament off-contest. Dávila Castellón won the national championship as the Nicaraguan with the best result.
1982	Danilo Canda	Canda won on tiebreaks ahead of Dávila Castellón.
1983	Martín Guevara	
1984	Martín Guevara	
1985	Martín Guevara	
1986	Martín Guevara	
1987	José Luis Fonseca	
1988	Martín Guevara	
1989	?	Martín Guevara finished second.
1990	Martín Guevara	
1991	René Lacayo	
1992	Martín Guevara	
1993	Martín Guevara	
1994	Carlos Dávila	
1995	Carlos Dávila	
1996	Carlos Dávila	
1997	René Pilarte Tijerino	
1998	Carlos Dávila	
1999	Rodolfo Izabá	
2000	René Lacayo	
2001	Carlos Guevara	
2002	René Lacayo	
2003	René Lacayo	
2004	Félix Espinoza	Espinoza won on tiebreaks over Carlos Dávila.
2005	Carlos Dávila	
2006	Carlos Dávila	
2007	Carlos Dávila	Dávila beat Jorge Luis Picado in a playoff for first.
2008	Félix Espinoza	
2009	Maximiliano Rocha	Rocha beat Martin Guevara and William Bravo in a three-way playoff for first.
2010	René Lacayo	Lacayo finished ahead of José Luis Fonseca on tiebreaks.
2011	René Lacayo	
2012	William Bravo	Salvadoran IM Héctor Leyva won the tournament off-contest. Bravo, who finished second, won the national championship as the Nicaraguan with the best result.
2013	Marcos Ortiz	
2014	Carlos Guevara	Guevara won on tiebreaks ahead of Ricardo García and Marcos Ortiz.
2015	William Bravo	
2016	Juan José Pineda	
2017	René Lacayo	
2018	René Lacayo	
2019	René Lacayo	
2020	René Lacayo	
