= Honduran Chess Championship =

The Honduran Chess Championship is organized by FENAH (Spanish: Federación Nacional de Ajedrez de Honduras), the chess federation of Honduras, which was founded in 1993.

== Winners since 1983 ==
Year	Champion
1983	David Singh
1984	Ignacio García
1986	Daniel Colindres
1987	José Cruz
1988	Ricardo Haces
1989	José Cruz
1990	Ignacio García
1991	Javier Medina
1992	Javier Medina
1993	Samuel Norales
1994	Jeremías Samayoa
1995	Jeremías Samayoa
1997	José Antonio Guillén
1998	José Antonio Guillén
1999	José Antonio Guillén
2000	José Antonio Guillén
2001	Ricardo Urbina
2002	Luis Sieiro
2003	Ricardo Urbina
2004	José Antonio Guillén
2005	José Antonio Guillén
2006	José Antonio Guillén
2008	Iván Meza
2009	Javier Medina
2010–11	Daniel Colindres
2011–12	Daniel Colindres
2013	Nahún Gavarrete
2014	Nahún Gavarrete
2015	Alejandro Chinchilla
2016	José Antonio Guillén
2017	Ricardo Urbina
2018	Nahún Gavarrete
2019	José Antonio Guillén
2023	Nilson Cardenas
