= Equatorial Guinea Chess Federation =

Sports governing body in Equatorial Guinea

National Chess Federation of Equatorial Guinea
- Sport: Chess
- Jurisdiction: Equatorial Guinea
- Abbreviation: FENAGE
- Founded: 2018
- Affiliation: FIDE
- Regional affiliation: African Chess Union
- Headquarters: Malabo, Equatorial Guinea
- President: Pedro Nguema Ebile

Official website
- ajedrezguinea.com
- (Equatorial Guinea)

The National Chess Federation of Equatorial Guinea (abbreviation FENAGE Spanish: Asociación Nacional de Ajedrez de Guinea Ecuatorial) is the national federation of Chess in Equatorial Guinea. It promotes chess in Equatorial Guinea and represents Equatoguinean players internationally as a FIDE member organization. It was established in 2018 and joined FIDE in 2020. FENAGE also hosts local tournaments, though it is unclear if they hold regular national tournaments.
