= Seychelles Chess Championship =

Chess tournament

The Seychelles National Chess Championship is a chess tournament organized by the Seychelles Chess Federation. There are separate championships for men and women and for varying age groups.

The championship is open to all Seychellois nationals.

== List of Seychelles Men's Chess Champions ==
- 1992 - Frank Monthy
- 1993 - Ralph Kimende
- 1994 - Ralph Kimende
- 1995 - Divino Sabino
- 1996 - Benjamin Sonon
- 1997 - Michel Zialor
- 1998 - Benjamin Sonon
- 1999 - Benjamin Sonon
- 2005 - Richard Battin
- 2006 - Benjamin Hoaureau
- 2007 - Benjamin Hoaureau
- 2013 - Benjamin Hoaureau
- 2014 - Andre Stratonowitsch
- 2015 - Andre Stratonowitsch, Eden Island hosted by Venture-Bay Seychelles.
- 2016 - Andre Stratonowitsch
- 2017 - Andre Stratonowitsch
- 2018 - FM Hartmut Metz
