= Croatian Team Chess Championship =

Year	Venue	Champion
2013	Bol	ŠK Liburnija, Rijeka
2012	Šibenik	ŠK Liburnija, Rijeka
2011	Šibenik	ŠK Liburnija, Rijeka
2010	Šibenik	ŠK Liburnija, Rijeka
2009	Šibenik	ŠK ETF Osijek, Osijek
2008	Šibenik	ŠK Zagreb, Zagreb
2007		
2006		
2005		
2004		
2003		
2002		
2001		
2000		
1999		
1998		
1997		
1996	Tučepi	ŠK Borovo-Vukovar '91, Vukovar
1995	Tučepi	ŠK Teina-Mursa, Osijek
1994	Makarska	HAŠK Mladost-Novogradnja, Zagreb
1993	Pula	HAŠK Mladost-Novogradnja, Zagreb
1992	Pula	HAŠK Mladost-Novogradnja, Zagreb

Women

Years	Venue	Champion
2013	Bol	ŠK Liburnija, Rijeka
2012	Šibenik	ŠK Liburnija, Rijeka
2011	Šibenik	ŠK Liburnija, Rijeka
2010	Šibenik	ŠK Lucija-BKS Bank, Rijeka
2009	Šibenik	ŠK Lucija-BKS Bank, Rijeka
2008	Šibenik	ŠK Lucija-BKS Bank, Rijeka
2007		
2006		
2005		
2004		
2003		
2002		
2001		
2000		
1999		
1998		
1997		
1996	Tučepi	ŠK Forina-Mursa, Osijek
1995	Tučepi	ŠK Teina-Mursa, Osijek
1994	Makarska	HAŠK Mladost-Novogradnja, Zagreb
1993	Pula	ŠK Drava-Mursa, Osijek
1992	Pula	ŠK Mursa, Osijek

Junior

Years	Venue	Champion
2013	Đurđevac	HAŠK Mladost, Zagreb
2012	Topusko	HAŠK Mladost, Zagreb
2011	Sv. Filip i Jakov	ŠK Liburnija, Rijeka
2010	Sv. Filip i Jakov	ŠK Liburnija, Rijeka
2009	Sv. Filip i Jakov	HAŠK Mladost, Zagreb
2008	Sv. Filip i Jakov	HAŠK Mladost, Zagreb
2007		
2006		
2005		
2004		
2003		
2002		
2001		
2000		
1999		
1998		
1997		
1996	Tučepi	HAŠK Mladost, Zagreb
1995	Tučepi	ŠK Slavonska Banka, Đakovo
1994	Makarska	HAŠK Mladost-Novogradnja, Zagreb
1993	Pula	HAŠK Mladost-Novogradnja, Zagreb
1992	Pula	Mursa, Osijek

Cadet

Years	Venue	Champion
2013		
2012	Nova Gradiška	ŠŠK Konaki, Novo Virje
2011	Topusko	ŠK Liburnija, Rijeka
2010	Topusko	ŠK Liburnija, Rijeka
2009	Vinkovci	ŠK Podravka, Koprivnica
2008	Našice	

Cadet - Girls

Years	Venue	Champion
2013		
2012	Nova Gradiška	ŠK Rječina, Dražice
2011	Topusko	ŠK Polet, Buševec
2010	Topusko	ŠK Draga, Rijeka
2009	Vinkovci	ŠK Goran, Vrbovsko
2008	Našice	
