= Chess Federation of Armenia =

Governing body of chess in Armenia

- Formation: 1927
- Headquarters: Tigran Petrosian Chess House, Yerevan
- Region served: Armenia
- Affiliations: FIDE, European Chess Union
- Website: chessfed.am

The Chess Federation of Armenia (Armenian: Հայաստանի շախմատի ֆեդերացիա, romanized: Hayastani shakhmati federats’ia), also known as the Armenian Chess Federation, is the governing chess organization in Armenia and is affiliated to FIDE. The body was founded in 1927. Responsible for organizing individual and club championships for men and women and the various important international tournaments in Armenia, it also forms the Armenian national men's and women's teams. The Federation is a member of the European Chess Union.

== History ==
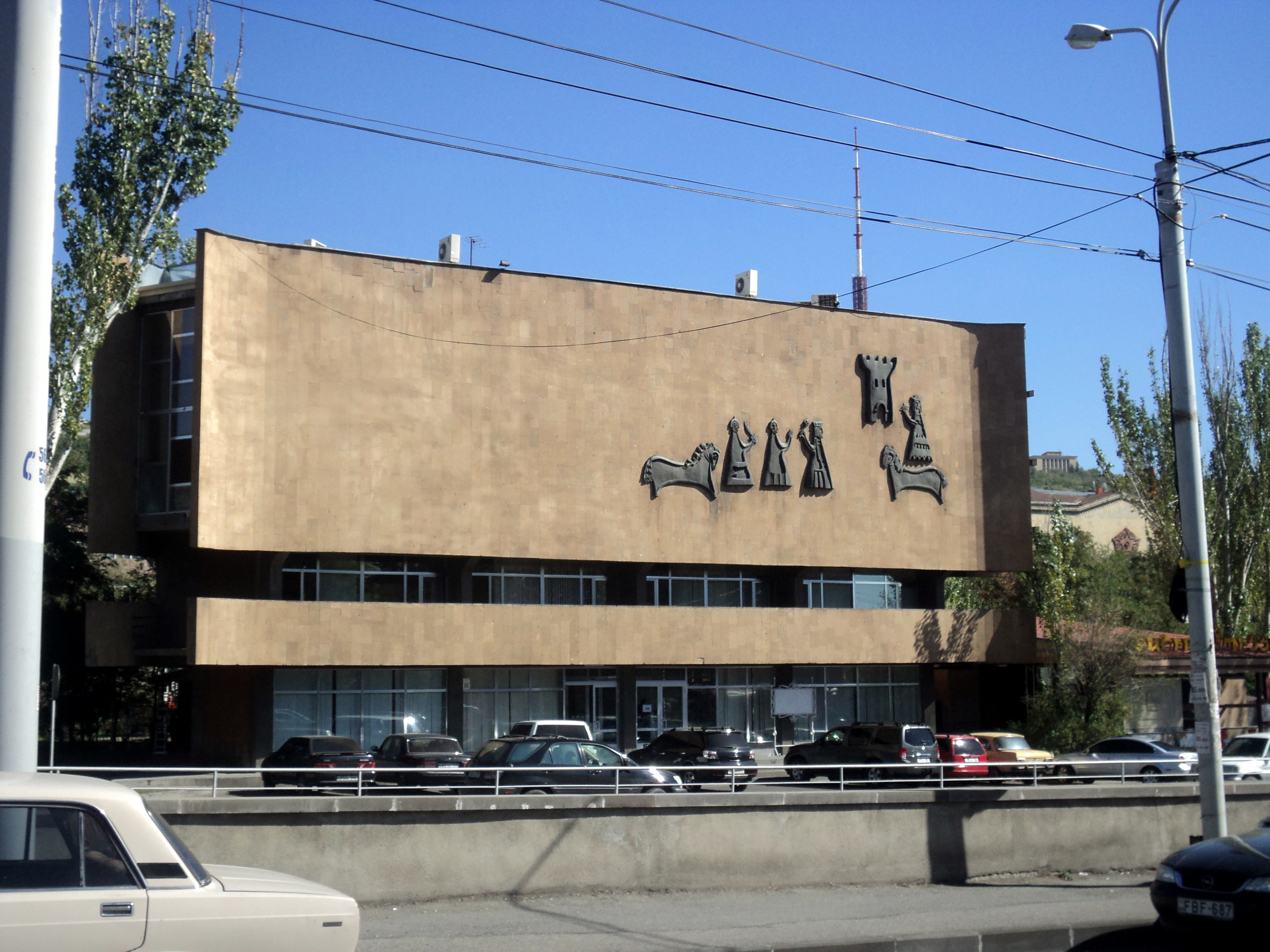
The Tigran Petrosian Chess House, where the Chess Federation of Armenia is based

Founded in 1927 as a chess section, in 1959 it was transformed into a federation. In 1958, the national team of Armenia took part in the USSR Chess Championship. The federation organizes men and women tournaments every year in the Armenian Chess Championship. The first championship was held in 1934 and the first champion of Armenia was Genrikh Kasparyan, who went on to win the championships a total of 10 times. So far, 75 championships have been held in Armenia.

Armenia became a member of FIDE in 1992. In Armenia, chess teams frequently participate in international competitions and have achieved considerable success. Armenia has hosted and organized many major international tournaments at the European and world level. The 32nd Chess Olympiad was held in Yerevan in 1996, the World Team Chess Championship was held in Yerevan in 2001 and in Tsaghkadzor in 2015, the 2014 European Individual Chess Championship was held in Yerevan in 2014 and the European Senior Chess Championship was held in Yerevan in 2016.

Since 1970, the federation has been operating in the Yerevan Chess House, which in 1984 was renamed the Tigran Petrosian Chess House. The building is located on Abovyan Street. In 1972, Kasparyan published the Chess in Armenia magazine. The Chess Academy of Armenia was founded in 2002.

== Board Members ==
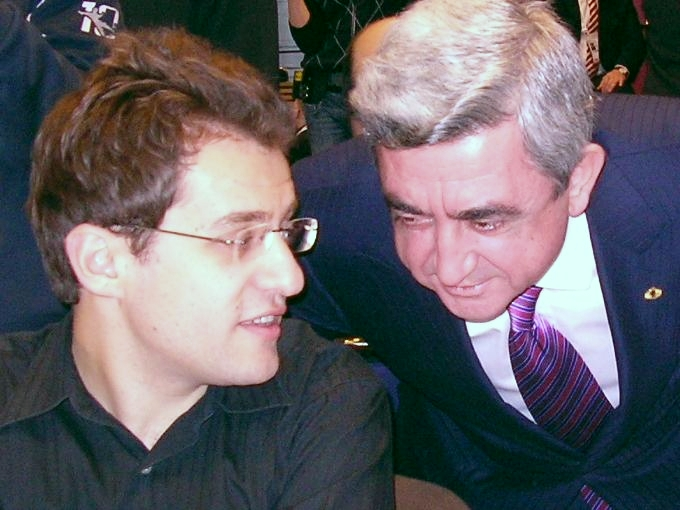
Chess Federation President Serzh Sargsyan with Armenia's chess team leader Levon Aronian at the 38th Chess Olympiad in 2008

Ten board members include:

- President – Serzh Sargsyan
- First vice-president – Smbat Lputian
- General Secretary – Gaguik Oganessian
- Vice-President – Tigran Sargsyan
- Vice-President – Levon Eolyan
- Vice-President – Yuri Arustamyan
- Vice-President – Gagik Gevorgyan
- Vice-President – Hovik Khalikyan
- Vice-President – Ashot Vardapetyan
- Vice-President – Hrach Tavadian
- Chairman Emeritus – Vanik Zakaryan

The Chess Federation presidency is composed of 59 members.

== Presidium ==
Presidium consists of 64 members, including grandmasters:

- Ashot Anastasian
- Levon Aronian
- Avetik Grigoryan
- Elina Danielian
- Arsen Yegiazarian
- Robert Hovhannisyan
- Ara Minasian
- Artashes Minasian
- Sergei Movsesian
- Tigran Nalbandian
- Arman Pashikian
- Arshak Petrosian
- Tigran L. Petrosian
- Gabriel Sargissian
- Rafael Vaganian

and International Masters:

- Vahagn Khachatryan
- Eduard Mnatsakanian
- Ashot Nadanian

== Committees ==
The Chess Federation establishes committees to coordinate the various aspects of chess and make relevant decisions:

- Club committee work carried out with (President Hovik Khalikyan)
- Chess board (president, Rafael Vahanyan)
- The ethics committee (president, Levon Yolyan)
- Media commission
- Women's committee (president, Argen Geghamyan)
- Composition Committee (chairman, Alexei Gasparyan)
- Chess modern technology committee (chairman, Aram Hajyan)
- Mass work committee (chairman Smbat Lputyan)
- Coaching (children's) board (president, Mr. Tavadyan)
- Referees Committee (chairman, Armen Nikoghosyan)
- Qualification Commission (Chairman Gagik Gevorgyan)
- Ratings committee (Chairman Ashot Vardapetyan)
- Veterans Committee (chairman, Yury Arustamyan)
- Audit committee (chairman, Armen Gevorgyan)

== See also ==
- Checkers Federation of Armenia
- Chess in Armenia
- List of Armenian chess players
- Yerevan Chess House
