= Maltese Chess Championship =

Annual national chess championship

The Maltese Chess Championship is the yearly chess championship organised by the Malta Chess Federation in Malta which determines the national champion. Initially it consisted of an Open Championship.

Now the National championships also include the Junior Championships, the Rapid Championships and the Blitz Championships.

The current open National Champion is Jack Mizzi. Jack Mizzi holds 2 other National titles: National Rapid Champion and National Blitz Champion.

The current 2025 Malta Junior Chess Champion is Matthew Portelli.

== Malta Open Championships ==
The first recorded open championship was held in 1923 and was won by Oscar Serracino-Inglott. Harry Camilleri won the championship a record eighteen times, first in 1965 and last in 2005, at the age of 72.

The current Malta Open Chess Champion is Jack Mizzi.

=== Candidates phase ===
To qualify for the Final phase of the Open Championship a player needs to have either placed first or second in the previous year or have placed in the top N of the Candidates phase of that year. N is determined by the number of participants.

=== Preliminaries Phase ===
To qualify for the Candidates, a player must have reached an established Elo rating, currently 1700, or have placed in the top N of the Preliminaries. The youngest player to have won the Preliminaries in Malta is Jack Mizzi.

=== Past Winners of Final Stage ===
#	Year	Winner
1	1923	Oscar Serracino-Inglott
2	1925	Oscar Serracino-Inglott
3	1926	Oscar Serracino-Inglott
4	1927	Erin Serracino-Inglott
5	1928	Erin Serracino-Inglott
6	1930	Erin Serracino-Inglott
7	1934	John Soler
8	1935	Carmelo Frisk
9	1936	Richard Soler
10	1937	Frank Ellul
11	1938	Richard Soler
12	1939	Richard Soler
13	1940	Richard Soler
14	1946	Wilfred Attard
15	1948	John Soler
16	1949	Richard Soler
17	1950	Wilfred Attard
18	1953	Wilfred Attard
19	1954	Wilfred Attard
20	1955	Giuseppe Mifsud Bonnici
21	1956	John Soler
22	1957	Wilfred Attard
23	1958	Wilfred Attard
24	1959	Wilfred Attard
25	1960	Wilfred Attard
26	1961	Wilfred Attard
27	1962	Claude Sollars
28	1963	Wilfred Attard
29	1964	Wilfred Attard
30	1965	Harry Camilleri
31	1966	Harry Camilleri
32	1967	Harry Camilleri
33	1968	Harry Camilleri
34	1969	Harry Camilleri
35	1970	Harry Camilleri
36	1971	Harry Camilleri
37	1972	Harry Camilleri
38	1973	Adriano Gouder
39	1974	Harry Camilleri
40	1975	Adriano Gouder
41	1976	Harry Camilleri
42	1977	Harry Camilleri
43	1978	Harry Camilleri
44	1979	Harry Camilleri
45	1980	Wilfred Attard
46	1981	Harry Camilleri; Joseph Gauci
47	1982	Josef Lauri
48	1983	Geoffrey Borg
49	1984	Geoffrey Borg
50	1985	Geoffrey Borg
51	1986	Geoffrey Borg
52	1987	Geoffrey Borg
53	1988	Conrad Thake
54	1989	Harry Camilleri
55	1990	Harry Camilleri
56	1991	Peter Sammut Briffa
57	1992	Stefan Camilleri
58	1993	Timothy Mifsud
59	1994	Timothy Mifsud
60	1995	Timothy Mifsud
61	1996	Timothy Mifsud
62	1997	Timothy Mifsud
63	1998	Timothy Mifsud
64	1999	Harry Camilleri
65	2000	David Cilia Vincenti
66	2001	Peter Sammut Briffa
67	2002	Peter Sammut Briffa
68	2003	Colin Pace
69	2004	Andrew Borg
70	2005	Harry Camilleri
71	2006	Colin Pace
72	2007	Patrick Zerafa
73	2008	Colin Pace
74	2009	Colin Pace
75	2010	Colin Pace
76	2011	Colin Pace
77	2012	Colin Pace
78	2013	Joseph Gauci
79	2014	Joseph Gauci
80	2015	Colin Pace
81	2016	Robert Zerafa
82	2017	Robert Zerafa
83	2018	Robert Zerafa
84	2019	Robert Zerafa
85	2020	Jake Darmanin
86	2021	Robert Zerafa
87	2022	David Cilia Vincenti
88	2023	Colin Pace
89	2024	Jack Mizzi
90	2025	Jack Mizzi

== Malta Rapid Championships ==
Since 2017, the Malta Chess Federation started organising the Malta National Rapid Championship.

In 2021 an online Rapid Gran Prix was held and this was won by Jack Mizzi. The 2022 Malta Rapid champion was Jack Mizzi.

#	Year	Winner
1	2017	Jake Darmanin
2	2018	Jake Darmanin
3	2019	Jake Darmanin
4	2021	Jack Mizzi
5	2022	Jack Mizzi

== Malta Blitz Championships ==
Since 2017, the Malta Chess Federation started organising the Malta National Blitz Championship.

In 2021, an online Blitz Gran Prix was held and this was won by Jack Mizzi. The 2022 and 2023 Malta Blitz champion was Jack Mizzi. Jack Mizzi set a new Malta Chess record when he won the 2023 Blitz championship with a perfect 9-0 score. In 2024 Mizzi won the Malta Blitz Chess Championship for the 4th consecutive time.

#	Year	Winner
1	2017	Jake Darmanin
2	2018	Jake Darmanin
3	2019	Matthew Fleri
4	2021	Jack Mizzi
5	2022	Jack Mizzi
6	2023	Jack Mizzi
7	2024	Jack Mizzi

== Malta Junior championships ==
The first Malta Junior Championship was held in 1946 but the Malta Chess Federation only has records since 1987.

The current 2025 Malta Junior Chess Champion is Matthew Portelli.

#	Year	Winner
1	1987	Duncan Vella
2	1988	Joseph Stafrace
3	1989	Joseph Stafrace
4	1990	Joseph Stafrace
5	1991	Duncan Vella
6	1992	Timothy Mifsud
7	1993	Timothy Mifsud
8	1994	Timothy Mifsud
9	1995	Peter Pullicino
10	1996	David Cilia Vincenti
11	1997	Colin Pace
12	1998	Timothy Mifsud
13	1999	Colin Pace
14	2000	Daniel Abela
15	2001	Daniel Abela
16	2002	Daniel Abela
17	2003	Charles Sinn
18	2004	Mark Cardona
19	2005	Mark Cardona
20	2006	Mark Cardona
21	2007	Robert Zerafa
22	2008	Robert Zerafa
23	2009	Robert Zerafa
24	2010	Andre Xuereb
25	2011	Jake Darmanin
26	2012	Jake Darmanin
27	2013	Jake Darmanin
28	2014	Jake Darmanin
29	2015	Jurgen Grima
30	2016	Jamie Farrugia
31	2017	Steve Mizzi
32	2018	Matthew Fleri
33	2019	Cosmin Alexa
34	2021	Matthew Fleri
35	2022	Jack Mizzi
36	2023	Jack Mizzi
37	2024	Jack Mizzi
38	2025	Matthew Portelli

== Other Links ==
- On the 18th victory of Harry Camilleri The Malta Independent
