= Surinamese Chess Championship =

The Surinamese Chess Championship is organized by the Suriname Chess Federation (Dutch: De Surinaamse Schaakbond), which was established in 1955. It was first held in December 1945. The Surinamese Women's Chess Championship was first held in 1989.

== National championship winners ==
Year	National champion
1945	Baltus Jessurun
1947	Alfred Soares
1948	Alfred Soares
1949	L. Kanteman
1950	L. Kanteman
1951	C. de Boer
1952	Alfred Soares
1953	C. de Boer
1954	C. de Boer
1955	C. de Boer
1956	Jules Jacobs
1958	Jules Jacobs
1959	Jules Jacobs
1960	Jules Jacobs
1961	Jules Jacobs
1962	Lothar Saam
1963	Jules Jacobs
1964	Lothar Saam
1965	Lothar Saam
1966	Brouwn
1967	Brouwn
1968	Theo van Philips
1969	Theo van Philips
1970	Lothar Saam
1971	Theo van Philips
1972	Theo van Philips
1973	Theo van Philips
1974	Piet Sonneveld
1975	Wim Veer Sr.
1976	Wim Veer Sr.
1977	Wim Veer Sr.
1978	Wim Veer Sr.
1979	Lothar Saam
1980	Wim Veer Sr.
1981	Jerome Lindeboom
1982	tournament not completed
1983	Dewperkash Gajadin
1984	Kiem Thin Tjong Tjin Joe
1985	Kiem Thin Tjong Tjin Joe
1986	Wim Veer Jr.
1987	Endy Kasanardjo
1988	Endy Kasanardjo
1989	Franklin Mungroo
1990	Dewperkash Gajadin
1991	Geert Peeters
1992	Roger Matoewi
1993	Geert Peeters
1994	tournament not held
1995	Julian Neyhorst
1996	Julian Neyhorst
1997	Julian Neyhorst
1998	Julian Neyhorst
1999	Roger Matoewi
2000	Michael Siban
2001	Franklin Mungroo
2002	Roger Matoewi
2003	Roger Matoewi
2004	Roger Matoewi
2005	Dewperkash Gajadin
2006	Roger Matoewi
2007	Roger Matoewi
2008	Roger Matoewi
2009	Suradj Hanoeman
2010	Roger Matoewi
2011	Roger Matoewi
2012	Romario Sanches
2013	Romario Sanches
2014	Romario Sanches
2015	Roger Matoewi
2016	Roger Matoewi
2017	Roger Matoewi
2018	Roger Matoewi
2019	Romario Sanches

== Women's championship winners ==
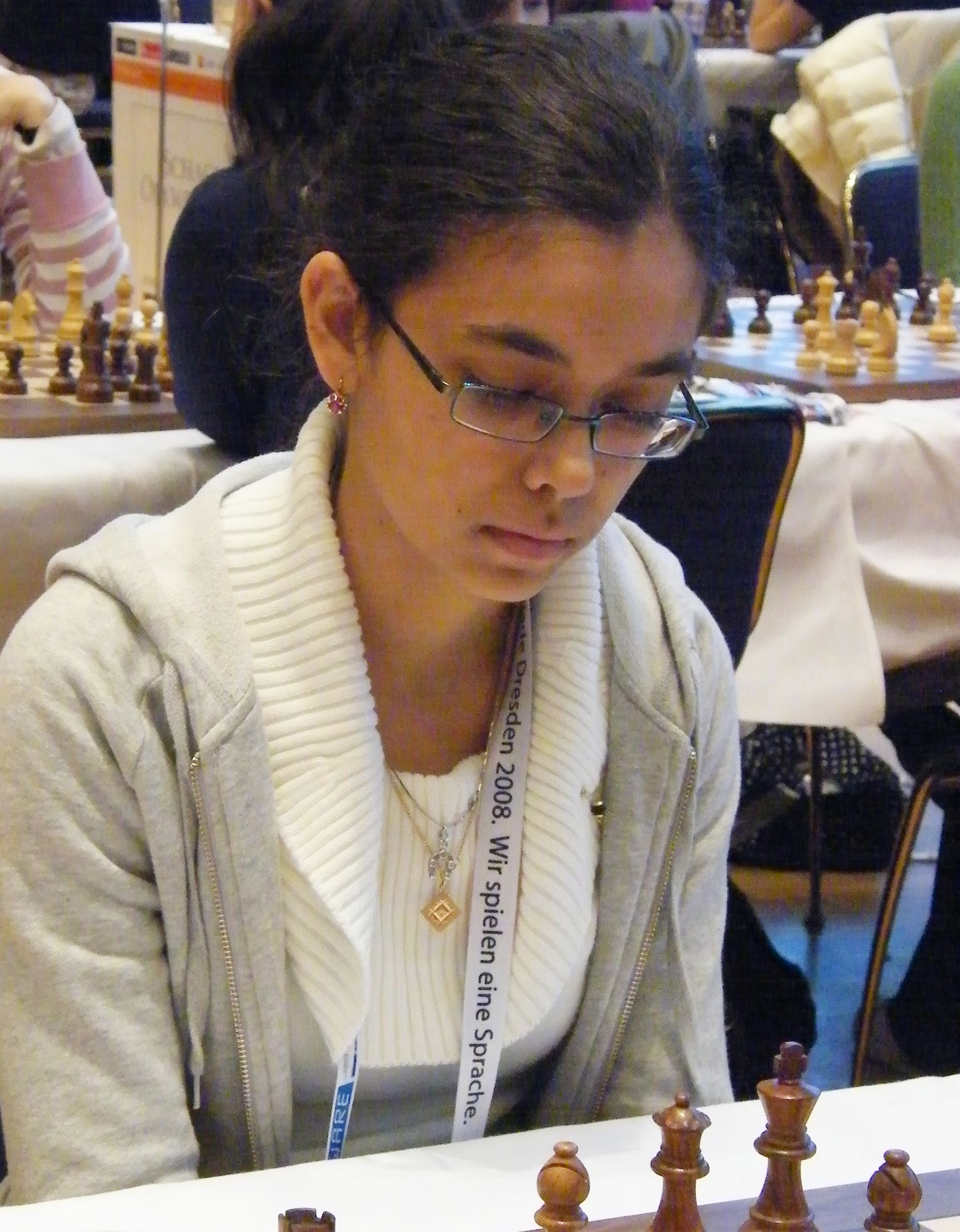
Victoria Naipal, six-time women's champion of Suriname from 2004 to 2010

Year	National women's champion
1989	Aruna Jarbandhan
1990	Aruna Jarbandhan
2002	Charissa Parmanand
2003	Charissa Parmanand
2004	Victoria Naipal
2005	Victoria Naipal
2006	Victoria Naipal
2007	Victoria Naipal
2008	Victoria Naipal
2009	Ekatarina Naipal
2010	Victoria Naipal
2011	Ekatarina Naipal
2012	Rosangela dos Ramos
2013	Rosangela dos Ramos
2014	Reyna Freyde
2015	Rosangela dos Ramos
2016	Rosangela dos Ramos
2017	Rosangela dos Ramos
2018	Rosangela dos Ramos
2019	Catherine Kaslan
