= Monalisha Khamboo =

Nepali chess player (born 1992)

Personal information
- Born: 1992 (age 33–34)

Chess career
- Country: Nepal
- Title: Woman Candidate Master (2015)
- Peak rating: 1877 (March 2010)

Monalisha Khamboo (Nepali: मोनालिशा खम्बू) is a Nepali chess player, promoter, administrator, and gender advocate. She is the first Women's Chess Champion of Nepal and has achieved the highest FIDE rating among Nepali women at 1877. She holds the title of Women Candidate Master, which was conferred by the World Chess Federation in 2015, and is the first female International Arbiter from Nepal. Over her career, she has secured the National Women's Chess Championship of Nepal multiple times and has represented her country in major international chess events, including the Asian Games, Asian Indoor Games, and the World Chess Olympiad.

== Early life and education ==
Khamboo completed her secondary education at North Point Academy and went on to attend GoldenGate International College. Khamboo received her bachelor's degree in food technology in 2013 from Tribhuvan University, where she also received a master's degree in economics (2019) and a second master's degree in gender studies.

== Chess career ==
Khamboo first encountered chess as a child and participated in her first competition in 2005. In 2008 she became the first Women's Chess Champion of Nepal and has received the highest rating of 1877 among Nepali women. She represented Nepal in the World Chess Olympiad in 2014 in Tromsø, Norway though she was not allow to play during the competition. She also played in 2016 in Baku, Azerbaijan; and 2018 in Batumi, Georgia.

FIDE awarded her the Women Candidate Master (WCM) title in 2015.

In 2022, Khamboo became the first female international arbiter from Nepal. As of 2023, she was the elected secretary of the Nepal Chess Association and in 2023 was elected Deputy General Secretary of the Nepal Chess Federation.

Khamboo founded the GoldenGate Chess Club in 2012. In 2024, she established the Himalayan Chess Academy, a group that trains young people in chess. The Himalayan Chess Academy is based on similar organizations that Khamboo observed in Europe and India.

== Personal life ==
Khamboo is married to Raju Ghising, the sports journalist.
