= Theodoros Tsorbatzoglou =

Greek businessman and chess executive

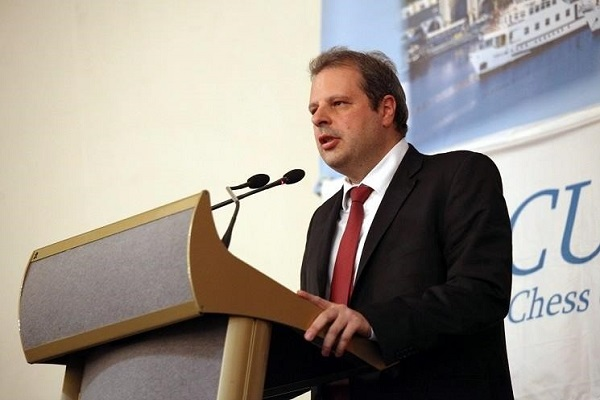
- Born: February 4, 1972 (age 54); Thessaloniki, Greece
- Occupations: Businessman, ECU Secretary General, President of AMO Galaxias Thessaloniki chess club
- Title: FIDE Master (1987); FIDE Trainer (2010); International Organizer (2011)

Theodoros Tsorbatzoglou (Greek: Θεοδωρος Τσορμπατζογλου, born 4 February 1972) is the Secretary General of the European Chess Union. Tsorbatzoglou was elected ECU Secretary General in 2014, and was a FIDE Commissions Member since 2006. He is the President of the AMO Galaxias Thessaloniki chess club since 2021. He is also a businessman in engineering, tourism and real estate sectors. He is married since 2015.

== Early life and education ==
Tsorbatzoglou was born in Thessaloniki. His family roots coming from İzmir (Smyrna) and Istanbul (Constantinople) from where his grandparents moved to Thessaloniki. He completed master's degree of Engineering at Aristotle University of Thessaloniki, and obtained a Paper in Business Administration. Serving in Hellenic Army 1996-1998 he got a Diploma in "Hermes" Telecommunication System. (NATO's communication system). Tsorbatzoglou has a Certificate in E-Trade & Internet Marketing, with Special Training for European Union Programs and Funds). He is fluent in Greek and English.

== Business career ==
From 1996-2004 Tsorbatzoglou had been working as an Engineer in Studies, at Supervisions in Constructions Programs. In the same time, he was trying his hand as a Consultant on EU Educational & Funding Projects (Instructor in European Training Programs, 1998-2002. Later on he performed as an E-Marketing and Conference Manager in Tourism sector (2003-2008). In 2008 he had been working as a Co- Producer and Host in Sports Educational TV Show Games Festival. In 2004 he established Event Consulting Co, a Marketing & Event Management Company. Until then Tsorbatzoglou organized more than 50 events, among which scientific conferences, corporate events, various sports events and a number of International Chess Events and World Championships. In 2005 he started a huge annual event with the brand name Games Festival. In 2013 he established Event Properties, a Real Estate Agency which is still developing and facing the new professional challenges.

== Sports & Chess Career ==
Theodoros Tsorbatzoglou made his first step in chess at the age of 8. At the moment he is a former chess player and FIDE Master. He was a member of various Greek Chess National Teams during his chess career which ended in 1993. Tsorbatzoglou retired from a professional chess career and started working as a chess trainer. Later on he obtained a FIDE Chess Trainer title (2010) as crown of his trainers career. In 2008 he was appointed an Executive Vice President of Galaxias Sports & Cultural Club, and became the President of the AMO Galaxias Thessaloniki Chess Club in 2021. Galaxias Sports & Cultural Club is a 6.000 m2 space of own Sports and Cultural facilities, including Volleyball Basketball, Chess Teams and Academies. Since 2006 he was a Member of FIDE Commissions, and in 2010 he became a Secretary of FIDE Events Commission. In 2014 he was elected ECU Secretary General.

== Activism ==
During the wars in the former Yugoslavia, Tsorbatzoglou had an active role in providing humanitarian aid to impacted civilians. He organized summer camps in Halkidiki, Greece for children living in the war zones. In 2023, Tsobatzoglou led the European Chess Union to visit a chess tournament in Lviv, Ukraine, the first international sports delegation to visit Lviv following the onset of the Russo-Ukrainian War.
