= Dewperkash Gajadin =

Surinamese chess player

Personal information
- Born: 26 January 1961 (age 65)

Chess career
- Country: Suriname
- Title: FIDE Master (2010)
- Peak rating: 2207 (January 2003)

Dewperkash Gajadin (born 26 January 1961) is a Surinamese chess player who holds the title of FIDE Master (FM, 2010). He is a Surinamese Chess Championship winner (1983), Chess Olympiad individual gold medalist (1984), and FIDE Arbiter (2012).

== Biography ==
In 1983, Dewperkash Gajadin won the Surinamese Chess Championship. In 2007, he won the international chess tournament Suriname Open. In 2013, Dewperkash Gajadin won a bronze medal in the Surinamese Chess Championship. He ranked 4th in the Surinamese Chess Championship in 2014 and 5th in 2016.

Dewperkash Gajadin played for Suriname in the Chess Olympiads:

- in 1984, at the first reserve board in the 26th Chess Olympiad in Thessaloniki (+6, =2, -1) and won individual gold medal,
- in 2000, at the fourth board in the 34th Chess Olympiad in Istanbul (+5, =4, -3),
- in 2002, at the second board in the 35th Chess Olympiad in Bled (+5, =3, -3),
- in 2004, at the third board in the 36th Chess Olympiad in Calvià (+3, =2, -5),
- in 2006, at the first board in the 37th Chess Olympiad in Turin (+4, =2, -3),
- in 2008, at the second board in the 38th Chess Olympiad in Dresden (+3, =0, -6),
- in 2010, at the second board in the 39th Chess Olympiad in Khanty-Mansiysk (+5, =2, -2),
- in 2012, at the second board in the 40th Chess Olympiad in Istanbul (+1, =3, -4),
- in 2014, at the first board in the 41st Chess Olympiad in Tromsø (+2, =1, -4),
- in 2016, at the third board in the 42nd Chess Olympiad in Baku (+2, =3, -3),
- in 2018, at third board in the 43rd Chess Olympiad in Batumi (+2, =0, -6).
