= Portuguese Chess Federation =

Governing body for chess in Portugal

- Sport: Chess
- Abbreviation: (FPX)
- Founded: 22 January 1927
- Affiliation: FIDE
- Regional affiliation: European Chess Union
- President: Dominic Cross

Official website
- www.fpx.pt
- (Portugal)

The Portuguese Chess Federation (Portuguese: Federação Portuguesa de Xadrez) is the governing body for chess in Portugal. It is affiliated to FIDE. Its president is Dominic Cross.

== Portuguese Team Championship ==
Up to 2008, the national team championship was a 9-round competition involving 10 teams. Each match was played across four boards. From 2009 to 2011, the championship was fought by 16 teams across six boards (2009-2010; four boards 2011). The 2012 edition returned to the old model.

Year	Location	Champion
2007	Évora	GD Diana (Évora)
2008	Évora	GD Diana (Évora)
2009	Vila Nova de Gaia	AX Gaia
2010	Vila Nova de Gaia	AX Gaia
2011	Torres Vedras	AX Gaia
2012	Matosinhos	AA Coimbra
2013	Matosinhos	AX Gaia
2014	Caldas da Rainha	GD Dias Ferreira
2015	Matosinhos	AX Gaia
2016	Matosinhos	AX Gaia
2017	Leiria	AX Gaia
2018	Maia	GD Dias Ferreira
2019	Évora	A.XAT Montemor-o-Novo
2020	Penafiel	GD Dias Ferreira
2021	Peniche	A.XAT Montemor-o-Novo
2022	Ovar	A.XAT Montemor-o-Novo
2023	S João da Madeira	AX Gaia
2024	Soure	AX Gaia

== Portuguese Chess Cup ==
The Portuguese Chess Cup (Portuguese: Taça de Portugal de Xadrez) is open to all clubs registered with the Portuguese Chess Federation. Each match is played across four boards.

Year	Place	Winner	Result	Runners-up
2008		GD Diana (Évora)	2.5 - 1.5	ACR Vale de Câmbra
2009	Gaia	ACR Vale de Câmbra	3 - 1	AX Gaia
2010	Gaia	GD Diana (Évora)	2.5 - 1.5	ACR Vale de Cambra
2011	Matosinhos	ACR Vale de Cambra	4 - 0	Moto Clube do Porto
2012	Vale de Cambra	ACR Vale de Cambra	4 - 0	ADRC Mata de Benfica
2013	Famalicão	AX Gaia	3 - 1	Clube TAP
2014	Gaia	GD Dias Ferreira	2 - 2	AX Gaia
2015	Alcochete	GD Dias Ferreira	2 - 2	Sporting
2016	Alcochete	GD Dias Ferreira	3 - 1	Sporting
2017	Maia	AA Coimbra	3 - 1	EX Porto
2019	Évora	A.XAT Montemor-o-Novo	3 - 1	AA Coimbra
2020	cancelled due to COVID-19 pandemic in Portugal			
2021	not held due to COVID-19 pandemic in Portugal			
2022	Ovar	A.XAT Montemor-o-Novo	4 - 0	Vitória SC
2023	S João da Madeira	Estrelas São João de Brito	4 - 0	GX Alekhine
2024	Soure	GX Alekhine	3 - 1	AA Coimbra

== Portuguese Individual Championship ==
The Portuguese Chess Championship is the annual individual national chess championship of Portugal. It was established in 1911.
