= Chinese Taipei Chess Association =

Governing body of chess in the Republic of China

- 中華民國西洋棋協會
- Sport: Chess

Official website
- www.chinesetaipeichess.com.tw

Chinese Taipei Chess Association (Chinese: 中華民國西洋棋協會; pinyin: Zhōnghuá Mínguó Xīyáng Qí Xiéhuì) is the governing body for chess in the Republic of China, (Taiwan). It is a member of the Chinese Taipei Olympic Committee. It is based in Taipei, Taiwan. Joined FIDE in 2004 (Zone 3.3).

- President: Szu-Chuen TSAI (appointed in 2007)
- General Secretary: Ko-Fei LIU
