= Haitian Chess Federation =

Haitian chess organization

Fédération Haïtienne des Echecs
- Abbreviation: FHE
- Headquarters: Port-au-Prince, Haiti
- President: Philippe Victor Chatelain
- Vice-President: Gottfried Kräuchi
- Treasurer: Jean Philippe Bonne Annee

The Haitian Chess Federation (French: Fédération Haïtienne des Echecs - FHE) is the national organization for chess in Haiti. The current president is Philippe Victor Chatelain who has been elected after the former President Jean Lamothe died on August 22, 2017, the Vice-President is Gottfried Kräuchi, and the treasurer is Jean Philippe Bonne Annee. The headquarters of the Haitian Chess Federation is Port-au-Prince. The Haitian federation was founded in 1985. The Haitian Chess Federation is a member of the FIDE (Fédération Internationale des Échecs) and the Association internationale des échecs francophones (AIDEF) (International Association of Francophone Chess).

In 2008, the Federation set up the Academie d'Echecs (Chess Academy), a non-profit organization to promote chess playing in schools.

The Haitian national chess team started to participate in the Olympiad in 1986. Since 2005 the Haitian chess federation has organized an annual interschool tournament. The first participation of a school in Hinche was 2011; the Lycee Dumarsais Estime won the trophy twice, in 2012 and 2013, before losing to Avenue Maurepas School in Saint in 2014 and 2015. In recent years, chess has seen a rise in Haiti, with more players on the Olympiad Team.
