= European Chess Union =

Governing body for chess in Europe

European Chess Union (ECU)
- Abbreviation: ECU
- Formation: 1985
- Headquarters: Hünenberg, Switzerland
- Location: Europe
- Members: 54 national federations
- President: Zurab Azmaiparashvili
- Website: www.europechess.org

The European Chess Union (ECU) is an independent association for the interests of European chess. The European Chess Union was founded on August 30, 1985, with the organization's founding meeting taking place in Graz, Austria.

== Board ==
The European Chess Union Board is elected for a four-year term. Its members for the 2022–2026 term are the following:

- Zurab Azmaiparashvili – President
- Dana Reizniece-Ozola – Deputy President
- Gunnar Bjornsson – Vice President
- Malcolm Pein – Vice President
- Alojzije Jankovic – Vice President
- Eva Repková – Vice President
- Jean-Michel Rapaire – Vice President
- Theodoros Tsorbatzoglou – Secretary General
- Ion-Serban Dobronauteanu – Treasurer
- Vanja Draskovic – Honorary Vice President
- Johann Poecksteiner – Honorary Vice President

=== ECU presidents ===
- 1985-1986: Rolf Littorin, Sweden
- 1986-1998: Kurt Jungwirth, Austria
- 1998-2010: Boris Kutin, Slovenia
- 2010-2014: Silvio Danailov, Bulgaria
- 2014–present: Zurab Azmaiparashvili, Georgia

== Member federations ==
- Albania – Albanian Chess Federation
- Andorra – Andorran Chess Federation
- Armenia – Chess Federation of Armenia
- Austria – Austrian Chess Federation
- Azerbaijan – Azerbaijan Chess Federation
- Belarus – Belarus Chess Federation (suspended)
- Belgium – Royal Belgian Chess Federation
- Bosnia and Herzegovina – Chess Union of Bosnia and Herzegovina
- Croatia – Croatian Chess Federation
- Cyprus – Cyprus Chess Federation
- Czech Republic – Chess Federation of the Czech Republic
- Denmark – Danish Chess Union
- England – English Chess Federation
- Estonia – Estonian Chess Federation
- Faroe Islands – Faroese Chess Federation
- Finland – Finnish Chess Federation
- France – French Chess Federation
- Georgia – Georgian Chess Federation
- Germany – German Chess Federation
- Greece – Greek Chess Federation
- Guernsey – Guernsey Chess Federation
- Hungary – Hungarian Chess Federation
- Iceland – Icelandic Chess Federation
- Ireland – Irish Chess Union
- Israel – Israel Chess Federation
- Italy – Italian Chess Federation
- Jersey – Jersey Chess Federation
- Kosovo - Kosovo Chess Federation
- Latvia – Latvian Chess Federation
- Liechtenstein – Liechtenstein Chess Federation
- Lithuania – Lithuanian Chess Federation
- Luxembourg – Luxembourg Chess Federation
- Malta – Malta Chess Federation
- Moldova – Moldova Chess Federation
- Monaco – Monaco Chess Federation
- Montenegro – Montenegro Chess Federation
- Netherlands – Royal Dutch Chess Federation
- North Macedonia – Chess Federation of Macedonia
- Norway – Norwegian Chess Federation
- Poland – Polish Chess Federation
- Portugal – Portuguese Chess Federation
- Romania – Romanian Chess Federation
- San Marino – San Marino Chess Federation
- Scotland – Chess Scotland
- Serbia – Chess Federation of Serbia
- Slovakia – Slovak Chess Federation
- Slovenia – Slovenian Chess Federation
- Spain – Spanish Chess Federation
- Sweden – Swedish Chess Federation
- Switzerland – Swiss Chess Federation
- Turkey – Turkish Chess Federation
- Ukraine – Ukrainian Chess Federation
- Wales – Welsh Chess Union

The Bulgarian Chess Federation was expelled on 10 September 2016.

Belarus was suspended on 5 March 2022 in response to the 2022 Russian invasion of Ukraine. Russia (Russian Chess Federation) withdrew from the European Chess Union on 14 April 2022, and later joined the Asian Chess Federation on 23 February 2023. Both countries were banned from attending the 2022 Chess Olympiad.

== ECU tournaments ==
=== Individual championships ===
- European Individual Championship
- European Individual Championship for Women
- European Youth Championship
- European Senior Championship
- European Amateur Championship
- EU Individual Open Championship
- EU Youth Championship
- European School Chess Championship
- European Rapid Championship
- European Rapid Championship for Women
- European Blitz Championship
- European Blitz Championship for Women
- European Universities Chess Championship

=== Team championships ===
- European Team Championship
- European Team Championship for Women
- European Youth Team Championship
- European Senior Team Championship
- European Club Cup
- European Small Nations Team Chess Championship
