= List of Armenian chess players =

This is a complete list of Armenian chess title-holders as of January 2010.

== Grandmasters ==
- Robert Aghasaryan
- Varuzhan Akobian
- Vladimir Akopian
- Ashot Anastasian
- Zaven Andriasian
- Levon Aronian
- Georgy Arzumanian
- Karen Asrian
- Levon Babujian
- Artur Chibukhchian
- Oganes Danielian
- Hovhannes Gabuzyan
- Sergey Galdunts
- Avetik Grigoryan
- Karen H. Grigoryan
- Hovik Hayrapetyan
- Gevorg Harutjunyan
- Melikset Khachiyan
- Tigran Kotanjian
- Smbat Lputian
- David Markosian
- Haik M Martirosyan
- Hrant Melkumyan
- Ara Minasian
- Artashes Minasian
- Sergei Movsesian
- Karen Movsziszian
- Tigran Nalbandian
- Arman Pashikian
- Arshak Petrosian
- Davit G. Petrosian
- Tigran Petrosian
- Tigran L. Petrosian
- Manuel Petrosyan
- Gabriel Sargissian
- Narek Seferjan
- Hrair Simonian
- Samvel Ter-Sahakyan
- Rafael Vaganian
- Arsen Yegiazarian
- Robert Hovhannisyan
- Elina Danielian

== International Masters ==
- Artur Arustamian
- Levon Eolian
- Beniamin Galstian
- Karen Grigorian
- Aram Hakobyan
- Yuri Hambardzumian
- Tigran K. Harutyunyan
- Arman Hayrapetian
- Mher Hovhanisian
- Vartan Kagramanianz
- Norik Kalantarian
- David Kalashian
- David Karatorossian
- Genrikh Kasparyan
- Vahagn Khachatryan
- Andranik Matikozian
- Arman Mikaelyan
- Lilit Mkrtchian
- Eduard Mnatsakanian
- Ashot Nadanian
- Karen Petrosian
- Suren Petrosian
- Tigran S. Petrosyan
- David Shahinyan
- Arsen Stambulian

== Women Grandmasters ==
- Nelly Aginian
- Lilit Galojan
- Maria Kursova
- Naira Movsisian
- Elina Danielian
- Tatev Abrahamyan

== Women International Masters ==
- Siranush Andriasian
- Sona Asatryan
- Susanna Gaboyan
- Narine Gasparian
- Maria Gevorgyan
- Siranush Ghukasyan
- Anna Hairapetian
- Goar Hlgatian
- Narine Karakashian
- Natalia Khoudgarian
- Mariam Mkrtchyan
- Irina Vaganian

== See also ==
- Chess in Armenia
- List of Armenians
- List of chess players
