= 41st Chess Olympiad =

2014 chess tournament in Tromsø, Norway

- Logo of the 41st Chess Olympiad
- Host city: Tromsø
- Country: Norway
- Nations: 172 (Open); 131 (Women)
- Teams: 177 (Open); 136 (Women)
- Athletes: 1,570 (881 in open and 689 in women's event)
- Dates: 1–14 August 2014
- Main venue: Mackhallen

Medalists

Team (Open)
- 1st place, gold medalist(s): China
- 2nd place, silver medalist(s): Hungary
- 3rd place, bronze medalist(s): India

Team (Women)
- 1st place, gold medalist(s): Russia
- 2nd place, silver medalist(s): China
- 3rd place, bronze medalist(s): Ukraine

Individual (Open)
- (China) Yu Yangyi

Individual (Women)
- (Georgia (country)) Nana Dzagnidze

The 41st Chess Olympiad (Norwegian: Den 41. Sjakkolympiade, Northern Sami: 41. Šáhkkaolympiáda), organised by the Fédération Internationale des Échecs (FIDE) and comprising an open and women's tournament, as well as several events designed to promote the game of chess, was an international team chess event that took place in Tromsø, Norway, between 1–14 August 2014. The organiser was Chess Olympiad Tromsø 2014 AS on behalf of FIDE.

A total number of 1,570 players participated at the Olympiad, with 881 in the men and 689 in the women's section. The number of participating teams was 177 from 172 countries in the open section and 136 from 131 countries in the women's section. The main competitive events were held at Mackhallen. The Chief Arbiter of the event was Greece's International Arbiter Panagiotis Nikolopoulos. The reigning World Champion, Norwegian Grandmaster Magnus Carlsen, was one of the eight official ambassadors. He also played as a member of one of the Norwegian teams.

China won the open section of the tournament for the first time, while Russia claimed victory in the women's section for the third consecutive time as well as third time overall. Chinese Yu Yangyi, playing on board three, and Georgian Nana Dzagnidze, playing on board one, were the most successful players in the open and women's section, respectively. The event was also the last competitive tournament for Judit Polgár, the strongest female chess player in history, who announced her retirement from competitive chess in the rest day of the Olympiad. Playing as a reserve player for Hungary in the open section, she won a silver medal with her team and recorded four wins, one loss and one draw for a total score 4½/6.

== Preparations ==
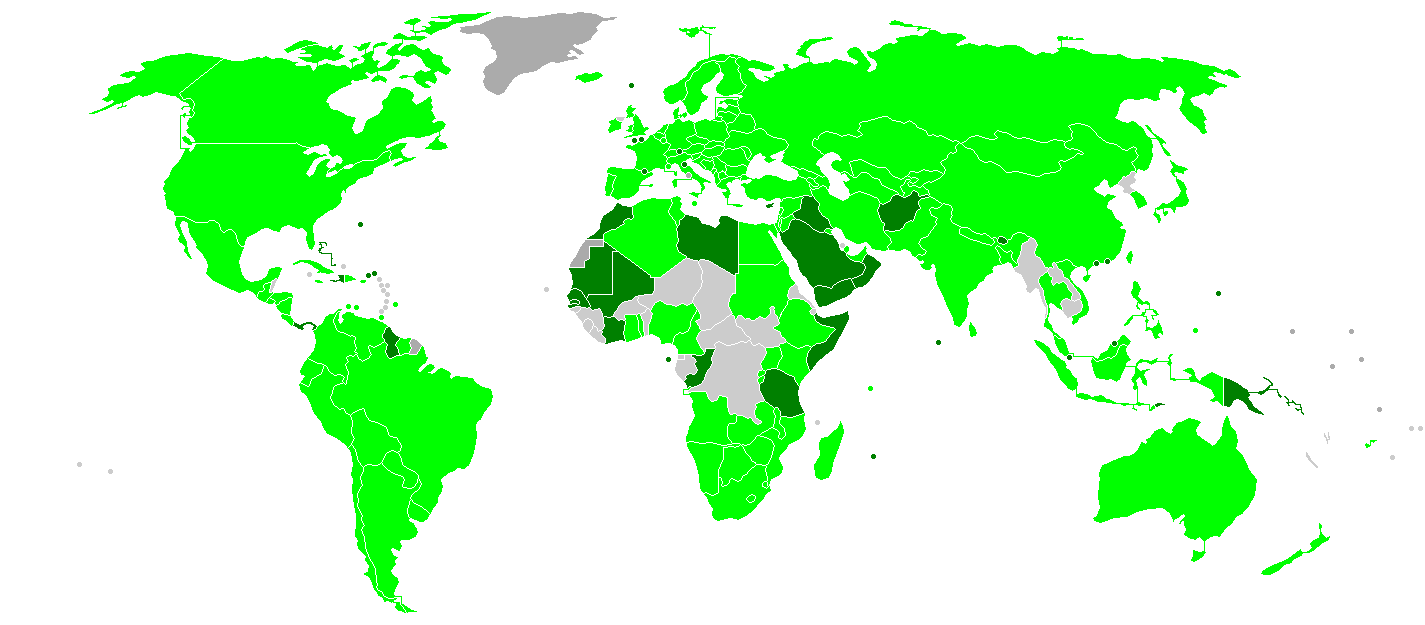
Participating nations Participating in both open and women's tournament Participating only in open tournament

There were two cities bidding to host the event: Albena and Tromsø. The bidding procedure, which was held in 2010 in Khanty-Mansiysk, lasted several days; in the end the Norwegians won by a 95–47 vote.

In May 2014, it was announced that the budget for the Olympiad would need 15 million NOK extra. The Norwegians also had to organise the Chess World Cup 2013 but did not take into account the cost for this event, in the amount of €2 million. The organisers requested additional funding for the Olympiad apart from the 75 million NOK that were already secured, but the Norwegian government did not approve it. Then, they sought sponsorships to cover the unanticipated expenses, and managed to attract private sponsors. In June 2014, the Norwegian parliament approved an additional 12 million NOK for staging the event, whereupon the organisers confirmed that the Chess Olympiad would take place in Tromsø.

The administrative director of Chess Olympiad Tromsø 2014 AS was Børge Robertsen. Chairman of the board was Henrik Andenæs, but later he was replaced by Herman Kristoffersen. There were eight ambassadors of the Olympiad: the reigning World Champion Magnus Carlsen; former World Champion Anatoly Karpov; former Women's World Champions Susan Polgar and Alexandra Kosteniuk; Woman Grandmaster Melanie Ohme; the historian, crime author, chess player and organiser, and politician Hans Olav Lahlum; former footballer Sigurd Rushfeldt; and the adventurer and journalist Lars Monsen.

The playing venue was Mackhallen, which is situated in downtown Tromsø. Mackhallen is the former site of the world's most northerly brewery, Mack Brewery, dating back to 1877.

== The event ==
=== Competition format and calendar ===
The tournament was played in a Swiss system format. The time control for all games was 90 minutes for the first 40 moves, after which an additional 30 minutes were granted and increment of 30 seconds per move was applied. Players were permitted to offer a draw at any time. A total of 11 rounds were played, with all teams playing in every round.

In each round, four players from each team faced four players from another team; teams were permitted one reserve player who could be substituted between rounds. The four games were played simultaneously on four boards, scoring 1 game point for a win and ½ game point for a draw. The scores from each game were summed together to determine which team won the round. Winning a round was worth 2 match points, regardless of the game point margin, while drawing a round was worth 1 match point. Teams were ranked in a table based on match points. Tie-breakers for the table were i) the Sonneborn-Berger system; ii) total game points scored; iii) the sum of the match points of the opponents, excluding the lowest one.

The opening ceremony of the Chess Olympiad was held at 19:30 CEST (UTC+2) on 1 August and the closing ceremony was held at 20:00 CEST (UTC+2) on 14 August. Tournament rounds started on 2 August and ended with the final round on 14 August. All rounds started at 14:00 CEST (UTC+2), except for the first and the final round which started at 15:00 CEST (UTC+2) and 11:00 CEST (UTC+2), respectively. There were two rest days at the tournament, the first one on 7 August after the fifth round and the second one on 13 August before the final round. In addition, the Arbiters meeting took place at 21:30 CEST (UTC+2) on 1 August and the Captains meeting at 09:00 CEST (UTC+2) on 2 August.

All dates are CEST (UTC+2)

| OC | Opening ceremony | A | Arbiters meeting | C | Captains meeting | 1 | Round | RD | Rest day | CC | Closing ceremony |

| August | 1st Fri | 2nd Sat | 3rd Sun | 4th Mon | 5th Tue | 6th Wed | 7th Thu | 8th Fri | 9th Sat | 10th Sun | 11th Mon | 12th Tue | 13th Wed | 14th Thu |
|---|---|---|---|---|---|---|---|---|---|---|---|---|---|---|
| Ceremonies | OC | | | | | | | | | | | | | CC |
| Meetings | A | C | | | | | | | | | | | | |
| Tournament round | | 1 | 2 | 3 | 4 | 5 | RD | 6 | 7 | 8 | 9 | 10 | RD | 11 |

=== Open event ===
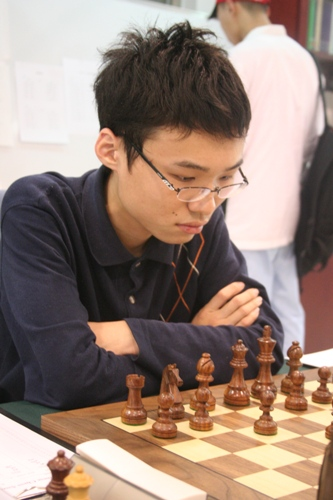
Yu Yangyi of China won the individual gold medal in the open event.

The open section of the tournament was contested by a record number of 177 teams representing 172 nations. Norway, as host nation, fielded three teams, whilst the International Braille Chess Association (IBCA), the International Physically Disabled Chess Association (IPCA), and the International Chess Committee of the Deaf (ICCD) each provided one team.

Players who participated at the Olympiad included the reigning World Champion and highest rated player in the world Magnus Carlsen, nine of the top ten players from the FIDE rating list published in July 2014, and four former World Champions. The former World Champion Vishwanathan Anand, who was the challenger in the World Chess Championship 2014, was the only player from the top ten who missed the Olympiad. The highest rated female chess player, Judit Polgár, represented Hungary in the open section. However, not all of the teams submitted their strongest line-ups for the Olympiad. China, who were expected to be one of the strongest teams in the tournament, were represented by only two players rated above 2700. Russia were the strongest team in the open section with an average rating of 2777 points, followed by Ukraine with 2722 and France, led by Maxime Vachier-Lagrave, with 2718. Other teams with average ratings higher than 2700 rating points were Armenia, with the World no. 2 Levon Aronian, playing on the top board, the United States, and Hungary.

China won their first gold in the open event and remained the only unbeaten team in the tournament. They scored eight wins and three draws for a total of 19 points, finishing two points clear of the opposition. Second place was shared by four teams on 17 points: Hungary, India, Russia and Azerbaijan. Hungary won the tie-breaker for second place to claim the silver medal, and India ranked third to win the bronze medal. Russia, who were once again clear favourites before the tournament, finished in fourth place. Armenia, the defending champions from the previous Chess Olympiad, scored 16 points to finish in eighth place.

Open event
| # | Country | Players | Average rating | MP | dSB |
|---|---|---|---|---|---|
| 1 | China | Wang Yue, Ding Liren, Yu Yangyi, Ni Hua, Wei Yi | 2699 | 19 | |
| 2 | Hungary | Lékó, Balogh, Almási, Rapport, Polgár | 2703 | 17 | 372.0 |
| 3 | India | Negi, Sethuraman, Sasikiran, Adhiban, Lalith Babu | 2631 | 17 | 371.5 |
| 4 | Russia | Kramnik, Grischuk, Svidler, Karjakin, Nepomniachtchi | 2773 | 17 | 352.0 |
| 5 | Azerbaijan | Mamedyarov, Radjabov, Mamedov, Safarli, Guseinov | 2694 | 17 | 345.0 |
| 6 | Ukraine | Ivanchuk, Ponomariov, Eljanov, Korobov, Moiseenko | 2723 | 16 | 377.5 |
| 7 | Cuba | Dominguez, Bruzón, Quezada, Ortiz, Gonzalez | 2629 | 16 | 361.0 |
| 8 | Armenia | Aronian, Sargissian, Movsesian, Akopian, Kotanjian | 2705 | 16 | 350.5 |
| 9 | Israel | Gelfand, Rodshtein, Smirin, Sutovsky, Postny | 2683 | 16 | 348.0 |
| 10 | Spain | Vallejo, Guijarro, Salgado, Illescas, Vázquez | 2640 | 16 | 334.5 |

Notes

- Average ratings calculated by chess-results.com based on August 2014 ratings; Chessbase's preview article was written in July.

All board prizes were given out according to performance ratings. Yu Yangyi on the third board had the best performance of all players in the tournament:

- Board 1: (Bulgaria) Veselin Topalov 2872
- Board 2: (Vietnam) Nguyễn Ngọc Trường Sơn 2843
- Board 3: (China) Yu Yangyi 2912
- Board 4: (Serbia) Nikola Sedlak 2773
- Reserve: (United States) Sam Shankland 2831

=== Women's event ===
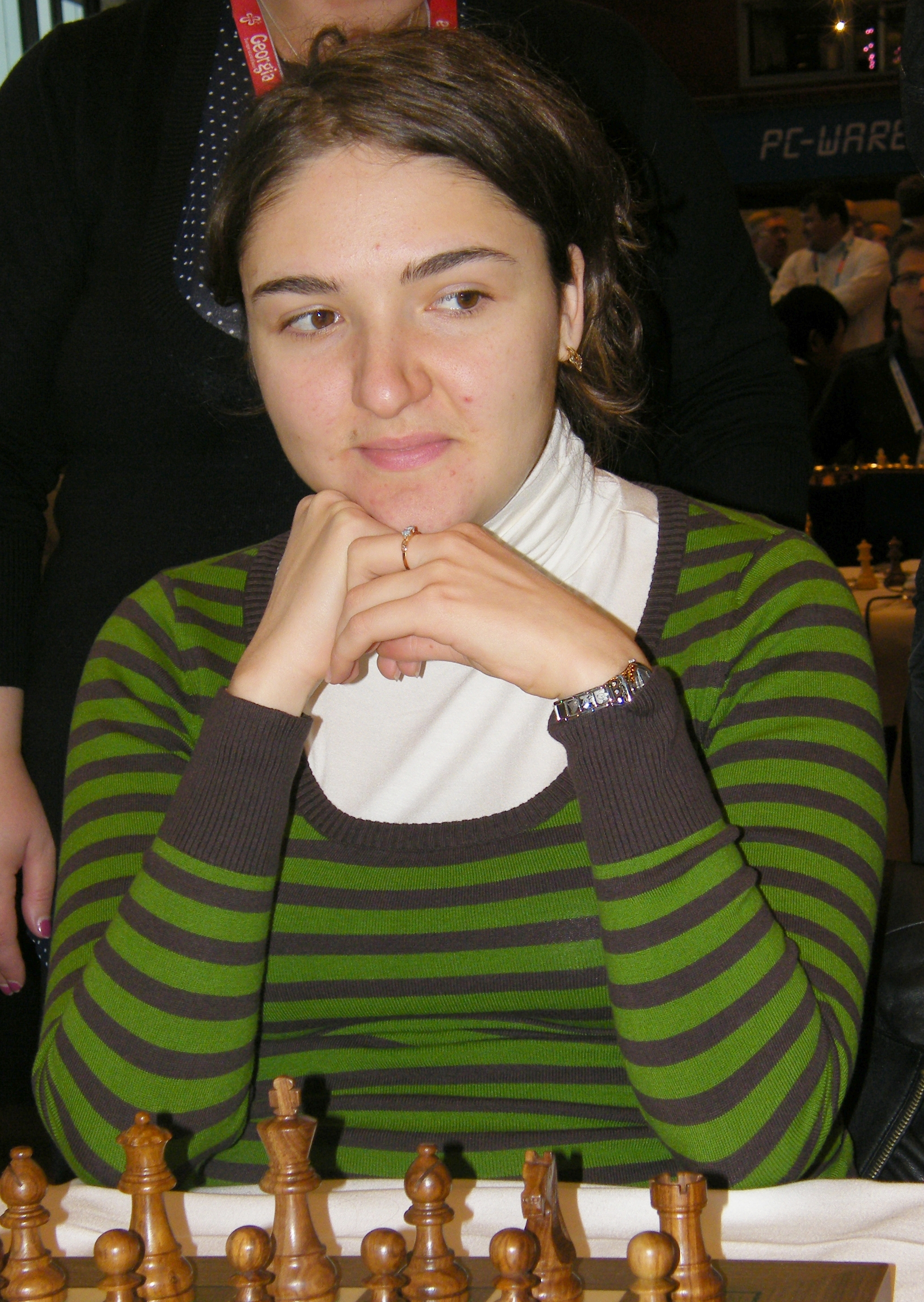
Nana Dzagnidze of Georgia won the individual gold medal in the women's event.

The women's event was contested by 136 teams representing 131 nations. Norway, as host nation, fielded three teams, whilst the International Braille Chess Association (IBCA), the International Physically Disabled Chess Association (IPCA), and the International Chess Committee of the Deaf (ICCD) each provided one team.

Among the players who played in the women's section were the reigning Women's World Champion Hou Yifan, seven of the top ten players from the FIDE rating list published in July 2014 (excluding Polgar who plays in the open section), and three former Women's World Champions. Koneru Humpy of India and Viktorija Čmilytė of Lithuania were the only two from the top ten female chess players to miss the Olympiad. China were the strongest team in the women's section, having brought all their strongest players, with an average rating of 2544. Russia were the second highest rated team with an average rating of 2521, and was represented by Kateryna Lagno on board one, Alexandra Kosteniuk, Natalia Pogonina, and Valentina Gunina. Ukraine with an average of 2505 rating points were the third highest rated team, having Anna and Mariya Muzychuk as well as the former Women's World Champion Anna Ushenina in their line-up.

Russia claimed victory in the women's event for the third consecutive time, scoring ten wins and one loss for a total of 20 points. China and Ukraine tied for second place with 18 points, but the Chinese won the tie-breaker to claim silver, and Ukraine finished third to take the bronze. Russia and China both had perfect scores before their match in the seventh round, when the Russians defeated their opponents 3–1, making a decisive margin for capturing the gold.

Women's event
| # | Country | Players | Average rating | MP | dSB |
|---|---|---|---|---|---|
| 1 | Russia | Lagno, Gunina, Kosteniuk, Girya, Pogonina | 2520 | 20 | |
| 2 | China | Hou Yifan, Ju Wenjun, Zhao Xue, Tan Zhongyi, Guo Qi | 2549 | 18 | 406.0 |
| 3 | Ukraine | A. Muzychuk, M. Muzychuk, Ushenina, Zhukova, Gaponenko | 2510 | 18 | 383.0 |
| 4 | Georgia | Dzagnidze, Khotenashvili, Javakhishvili, Melia, Batsiashvili | 2499 | 17 | 390.0 |
| 5 | Armenia | Danielian, Mkrtchian, Galojan, Kursova, Sargsyan | 2383 | 17 | 350.5 |
| 6 | Kazakhstan | Nakhbayeva, Saduakassova, Abdumalik, Davletbayeva, Dauletova | 2333 | 17 | 320.0 |
| 7 | Poland | Soćko, Zawadzka, Szczepkowska-Horowska, Bartel, Kulon | 2402 | 16 | 362.0 |
| 8 | United States | Krush, Zatonskih, Abrahamyan, Němcová, Foisor | 2405 | 16 | 339.5 |
| 9 | Germany | Pähtz, Schleining, Melamed, Ohme, Hoolt | 2379 | 16 | 304.0 |
| 10 | India | Dronavalli, Sachdev, Karavade, Gomes, Padmini | 2421 | 15 | 380.0 |

Notes

- Average ratings calculated by chess-results.com based on August 2014 ratings; Chessbase's preview article was written in July.

All board prizes were given out according to performance ratings. Nana Dzagnidze on the first board had the best performance of all players in the tournament:

- Board 1: (Georgia (country)) Nana Dzagnidze 2719
- Board 2: (Russia) Valentina Gunina 2651
- Board 3: (Russia) Alexandra Kosteniuk 2639
- Board 4: (Ukraine) Natalia Zhukova 2512
- Reserve: (India) Padmini Rout 2584

=== Gaprindashvili Trophy ===
The Nona Gaprindashvili Trophy is awarded to the nation that has the highest total number of match points in the open and women's divisions combined. Where two or more teams are tied, they are ordered by the same tie breakers as in the two separate events.

The trophy, named after the former women's World Champion (1961–78), was created by FIDE in 1997.

| # | Team | MP | dSB |
|---|---|---|---|
| 1 | China | 37 | 828.5 |
| 2 | Russia | 37 | 772.5 |
| 3 | Ukraine | 34 | |

== FIDE presidential election ==
The FIDE presidential election was held at the 85th FIDE Congress, which took place during the Olympiad. All of the 177 member nations of FIDE were eligible to vote for one of the two candidates: the incumbent FIDE President Kirsan Ilyumzhinov and the former World Chess Champion Garry Kasparov. Prior to the Congress, Kasparov reproached FIDE for irregularities in the published list of delegates and at least one member of the FIDE Electoral Commission (ELE) agreed with him. Finally, Ilyumzhinov defeated Kasparov by 49 votes (110 votes for the incumbent president and 61 for Kasparov).

== Controversies ==
On 7 July 2014, FIDE President Kirsan Ilyumzhinov complained in an open letter to the Prime Minister of Norway Erna Solberg that some teams had difficulties in obtaining travel visas. In the letter he mentioned that the team members with no Norwegian embassies or consulates in their countries had to travel to another country in order to apply for visas; moreover, each team member had to do it individually and in person. A day later, Børge Robertsen, administrative director of the Olympiad, responded on behalf of the organisers and notified them that they were working hard on the matter, and had already sent approximately 1,500 invitation letters to participants who required visas. He also stated that the entire visa application process is easy to follow and can be handled online.

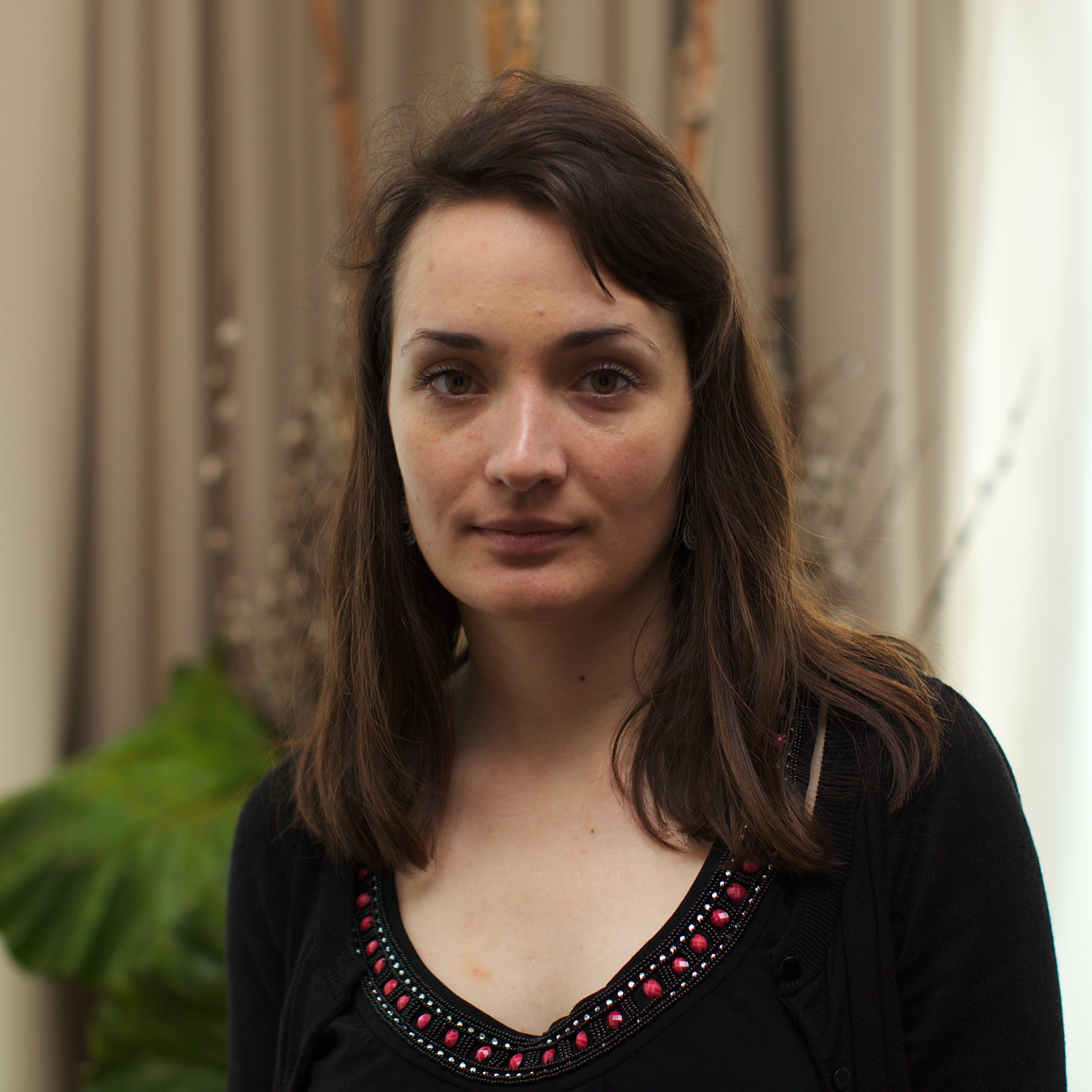
Kateryna Lagno's transfer from Ukraine to Russia caused controversy prior to the Olympiad.

On 16 July 2014, the organising committee announced that some national teams had missed the 1 June deadline to submit their team line-ups. They included Central African Republic, Gabon, Ivory Coast, Cambodia, Oman, Pakistan and Senegal in the open, as well as Afghanistan and Russia in the women's section. The organisers also stated that the regulations regarding the deadline applied to all, and that no exceptions would be allowed. Particularly surprising was the disqualification of Russia's women's team, as they were reigning champions from the previous Chess Olympiad. The chess media linked the missed deadline with Kateryna Lagno's circumstance of changing federations, and reported that the Russian Chess Federation allowed the deadline to pass, while awaiting her transfer from Ukraine to Russia to become official. It was alleged that Kateryna Lagno was needed to strengthen Russia's women's team following the retirement of Nadezhda and Tatiana Kosintseva. FIDE criticised the decision of the organisers not to allow these teams to compete at the Olympiad. FIDE Vice President Israel Gelfer said that the ultimate decision of allowing teams to compete lays in the hands of Kirsan Ilyumzhinov. In addition, he implicated Garry Kasparov, and advocated cancelling the Olympiad. Gelfer said that the organising committee was influenced by people who are working for Kasparov, and that they were using it for election purposes. Kasparov responded promptly, and characterized Gelfer's statements as 'bizarre', stating that to punish 175 teams for the mistakes of one was an absurd arrogance. He also criticised FIDE for allowing the Russian Chess Federation to violate the rules and receive an exception, and said that it was a real threat to the global chess community. On 21 July, the organising committee informed FIDE President Ilyumzhinov that, while they stood by the interpretation of the regulations, they would allow the teams who had missed the 1 June deadline to play.

== Deaths ==
The final day of competition was marred by the deaths of the Swiss-born Seychelles player Kurt Meier, who suffered a heart attack during his game, and Alisher Anarkulov, an Uzbek representing the International Chess Committee of the Deaf, who was found dead in his hotel room shortly afterwards. The closing ceremony began with a minute of silence to mark the two deaths.
