= Ara Minasian =

Armenian chess grandmaster (born 1974)

Personal information
- Born: April 14, 1974 (age 52) Gyumri, Armenia

Chess career
- Country: Armenia
- Title: Grandmaster (2004)
- FIDE rating: 2426 (July 2026)
- Peak rating: 2524 (July 2004)

Ara Minasian is an Armenian chess grandmaster.

== Chess career ==
In January 2008, he finished 7th in the Armenian Chess Championship with a score of 6.5/13.

In February 2010, he finished in 4th place at the 18th Fajr International Open Chess Tournament in Mashhad, half a point behind the winners Konstantine Shanava, Sergei Tiviakov, and Virginijus Grabliauskas.

In January 2011, he played in the Armenian Chess Championship, where he finished 9th and achieved wins against the higher-rated players Ashot Anastasian and Davit G. Petrosian.
