= Shushanna Sargsyan =

Armenian chess player

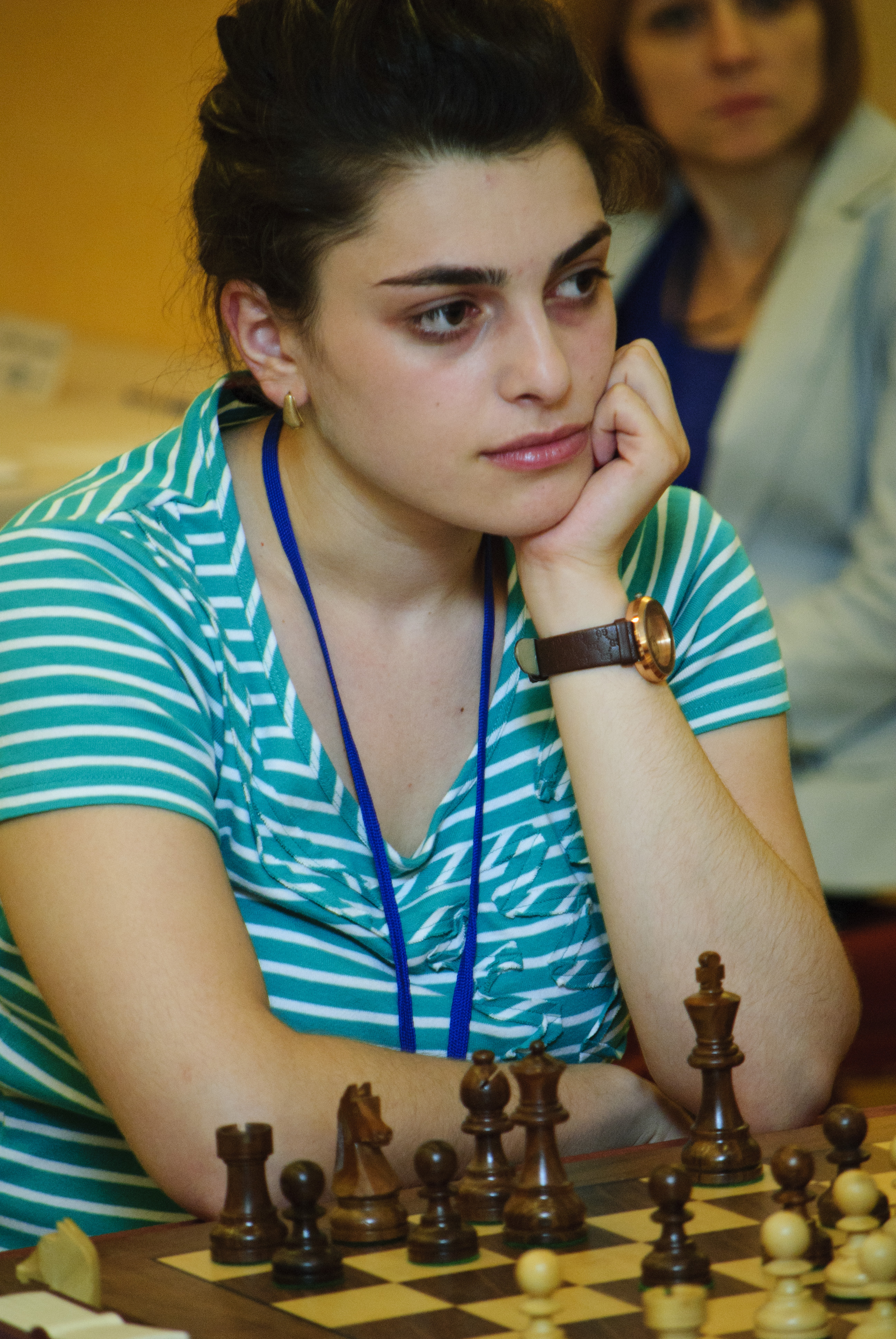

Personal information
- Born: March 2, 1992 (age 34)

Chess career
- Country: Armenia
- Title: Woman FIDE Master (2021)
- Peak rating: 2119 (April 2014)

Shushanna Sargsyan (Armenian: Շուշաննա Սարգսյան; born 1992) is an Armenian chess player, Armenian Women's Chess Championship winner (2014).

== Biography ==
In 2010, Shushanna Sargsyan won Armenian Girl's Championship in U18 age group. She repeatedly participated in the Armenian Women's Chess Championships finals, where she finished 4th in 2012, and ranked in 5th place in 2015. In 2014, Shushanna Sargsyan won Armenian Women's Chess Championship.

Shushanna Sargsyan played for Armenia in the Women's Chess Olympiad:

- In 2014, at reserve board in the 41st Chess Olympiad (women) in Tromsø (+2, =0, -0).

Since 2015, she rarely participates in chess tournaments.
