= Hrair Simonian =

Armenian chess grandmaster (born 1991)

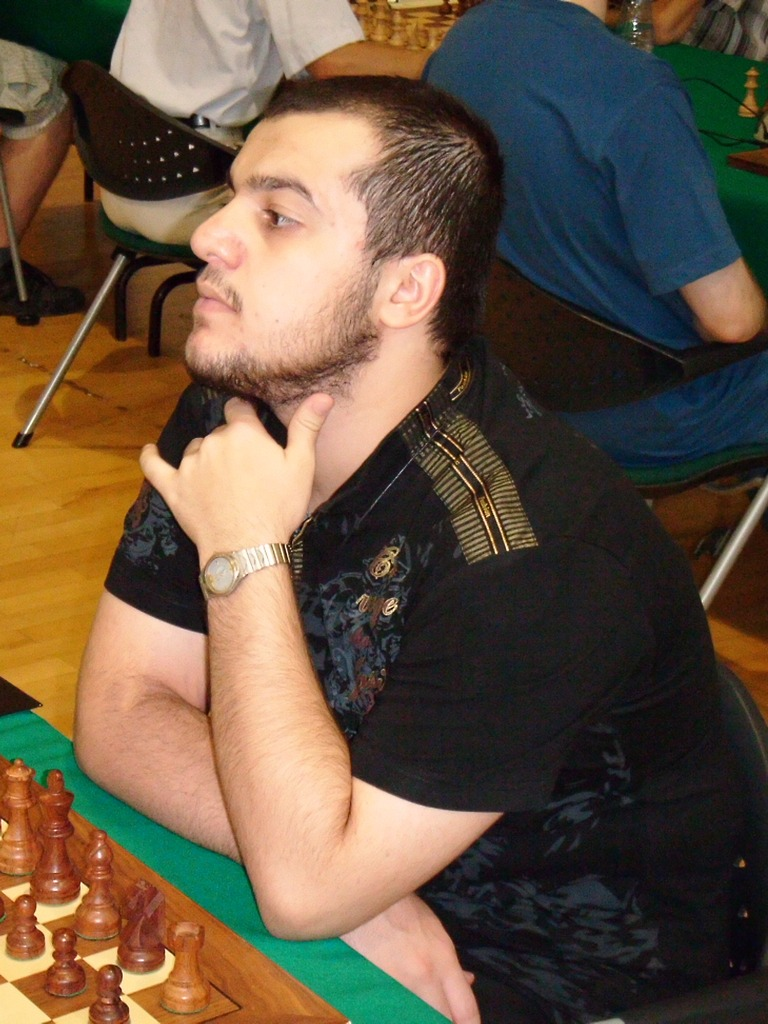

Personal information
- Born: January 8, 1991 (age 35)

Chess career
- Country: Armenia
- Title: Grandmaster (2009)
- Peak rating: 2521 (January 2010)

Hrair Simonian (Armenian: Հրայր Սիմոնյան; born January 8, 1991) is an Armenian chess grandmaster. Simonian is a well seasoned blitz player, having reached the final of the Internet Chess Club Blitz Open tournament and drew Hikaru Nakamura in a match 3–3. In 2011, Simonian took joint first in the 72nd Armenian Chess Championship, he shared the title with Karen H. Grigoryan.
