= Sona Asatryan =

Armenian chess player

Personal information
- Born: 26 April 1999 (age 27)

Chess career
- Country: Armenia
- Title: Woman International Master (2017)
- Peak rating: 2171 (October 2017)

Sona Asatryan (Armenian: Սոնա Ասատրյան; born 26 April 1999) is an Armenian chess player who holds the FIDE title of Woman International Master (WIM).

== Biography ==
Sona Asatryan was student of Ashtarak Chess School. In 2013, she won silver medal in Armenian Youth Chess Championship in the U14 girls age group. In 2017, Sona Asatryan won Armenian Women's Chess Championship 1st league.

She has repeatedly represented Armenia at European Youth Chess Championships and World Youth Chess Championships, where she won European Youth Chess Championship in 2017 in the U18 girls age group. In 2017, she was awarded the FIDE Woman International Master (WIM) title.
