= Vanik Zakaryan =

Armenian mathematician (1936–2023)

Vanik Zakaryan or Zakarian (Armenian: Վանիկ Զաքարյան, 21 March 1936 – 14 April 2023) was an Armenian academician, specialist on complex analysis, Member of the Presidium of the Armenian Academy of Sciences (2000), Vice-president (1996-2010) and then honorary vice-president (2010) of the World Chess Federation. He was awarded the Khorenatsi medal by a decree of Robert Kocharyan in the first years of the third millennium.

Zakaryan was born in Meghri and graduated from the Yerevan State University(1959), then worked as vice-rector for academic affairs of Yerevan State Pedagogical University. A Doctor of Physico-mathematical sciences (1974) and member of National Academy of Sciences of Armenia (1990), Professor Zakaryan was the head and then the dean of the Department of Mathematics of Yerevan Polytechnic from 1975 to 2017.

For many years, Zakaryan was also one of the leading Armenian chess players. Zakaryan was twice Armenian chess champion (1961 and 1976). He was the President of Armenian Chess Federation from 1994 to 2004.

Zakaryan died on 14 April 2023, at the age of 87.
