= Renier Vázquez Igarza =

Cuban-Spanish chess grandmaster (born 1979)

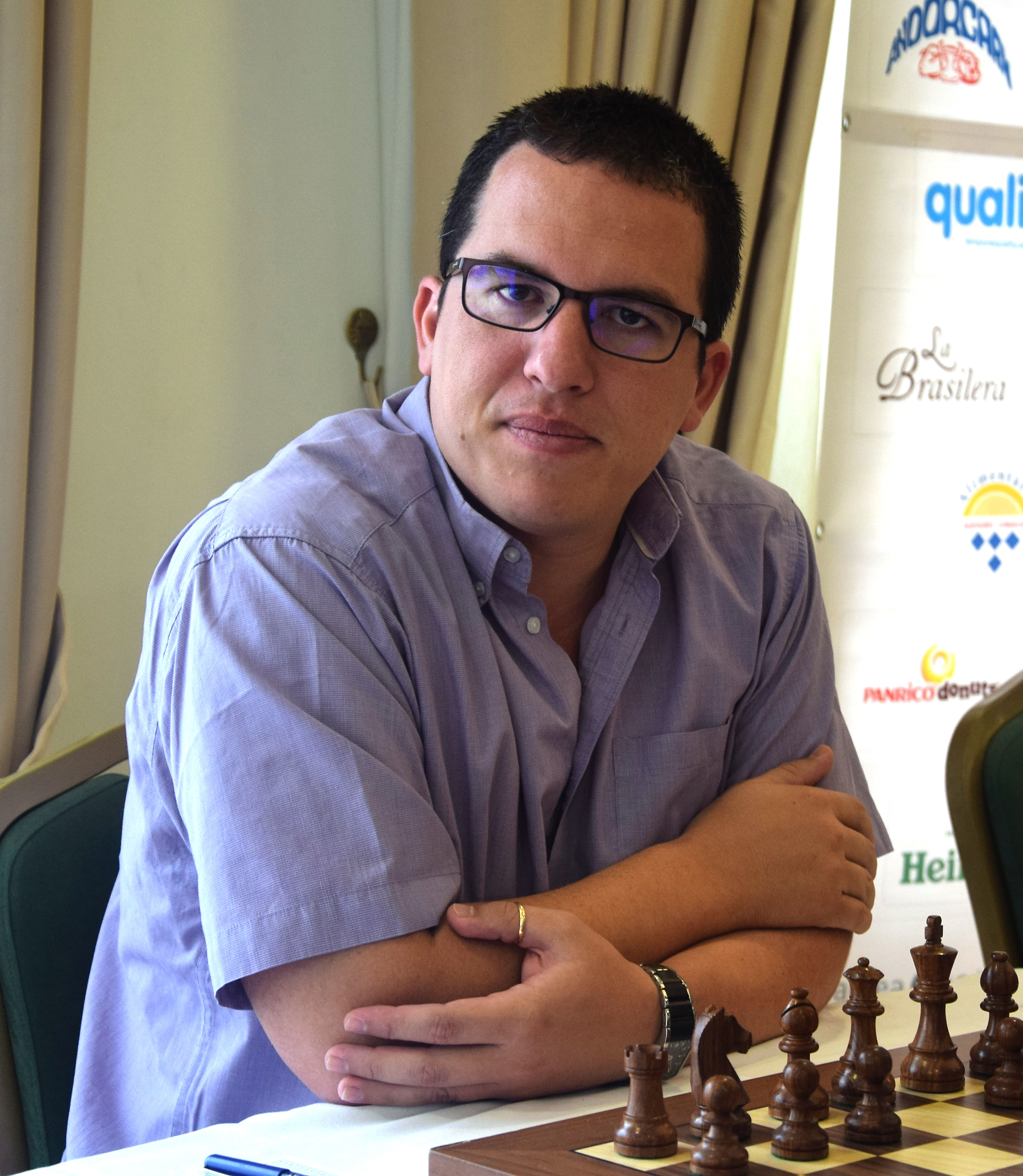
- Vázquez at the 2015 Andorra Open

Personal information
- Born: 8 August 1979 (age 46) Cuba

Chess career
- Country: Cuba (until 2004; since 2023); Spain (2004–2023)
- Title: Grandmaster (2007)
- FIDE rating: 2494 (July 2026)
- Peak rating: 2606 (April 2015)

Renier Vázquez Igarza (born 8 August 1979) is a Cuban-born Spanish chess player, who attained the rank of Grand Master in 2007. As of August 2014 he had a FIDE Elo rating of 2603 and was ranked 238th in the world.

He competed in the 41st Chess Olympiad in Norway in August 2014, finishing tenth with the Spanish team in the Open Event.
