= Hovik Hayrapetyan =

Armenian chess grandmaster (born 1990)

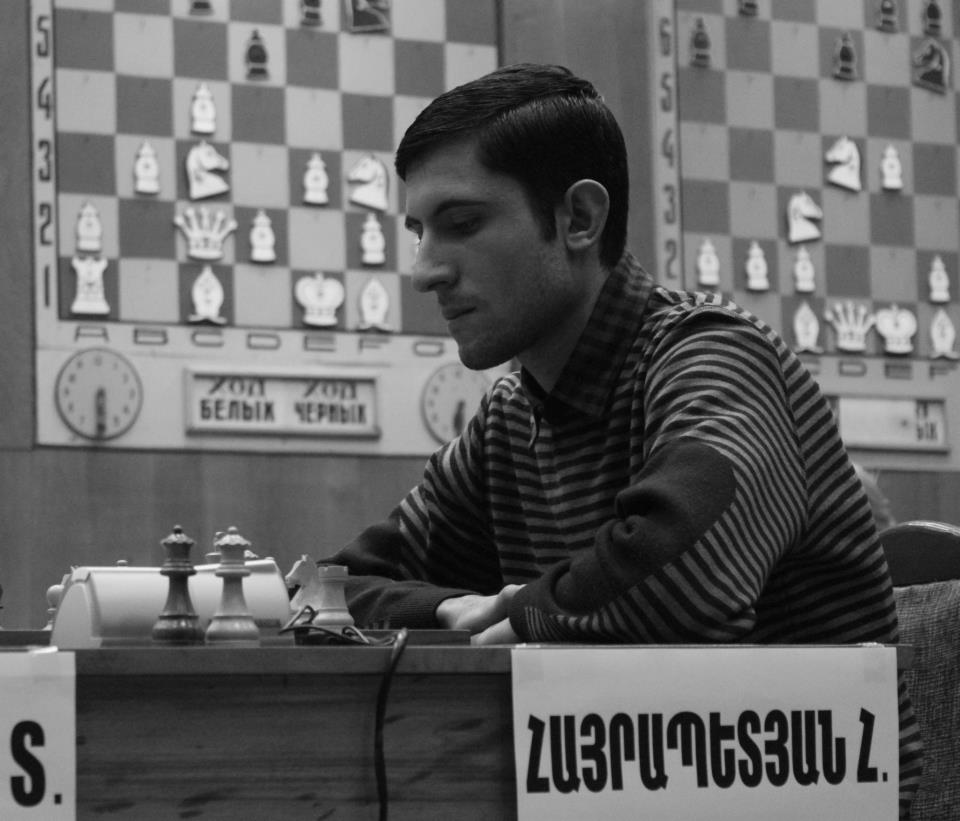
- Hayrapetyan in 2013

Personal information
- Born: February 15, 1990 (age 36) Stepanakert, Nagorno-Karabakh

Chess career
- Country: Armenia
- Title: Grandmaster (2013)
- FIDE rating: 2412 (July 2026)
- Peak rating: 2517 (April 2017)

Hovik Hayrapetyan (Armenian: Հովիկ Հայրապետյան, February 15, 1990) is an Armenian chess Grandmaster (2013). In 2010, he became the Armenian Chess Solving Champion.

== Achievements ==
- 2007: Second at Jermuk International Open Chess Tournament Under 18
- 2012: Second at Andranik Margaryan Memorial
- 2015: First at 76th Armenian Chess Championship First League
- 2021: First at the 11th Andranik Margaryan Memorial
