= Artur Chibukhchian =

Armenian chess grandmaster (born 1979)

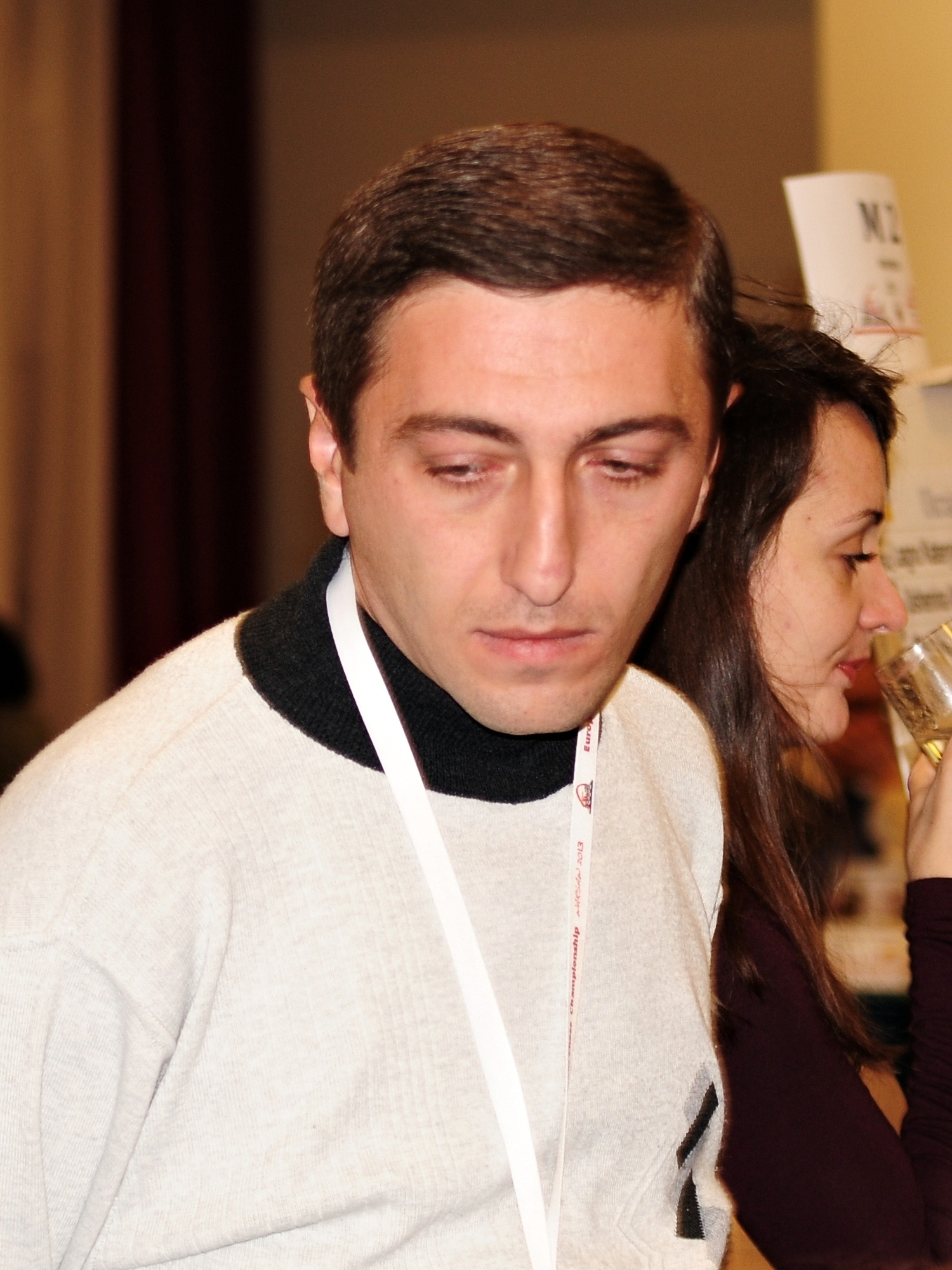

Personal information
- Born: October 6, 1979 (age 46)

Chess career
- Country: Armenia
- Title: Grandmaster (2009)
- Peak rating: 2500 (March 2010)

Artur Chibukhchian, born in 1979, is a chess Grandmaster and FIDE Trainer from Armenia. He has played 183 chess games from 1994 to 2019. He is regarded as a specialist in aggressive openings like the King's Indian Defence and Sicilian Defence.

== Career achievements ==
Chibukhchian started with a FIDE rating of 2250. He obtained the International Master (IM) title in 1998 and the Grandmaster (GM) title in 2009 after his highest achieved FIDE rating of 2502.

== Notable games ==
Year	Opponent Players	Tournament	Game	Notes
2009	Andrei-Mihai Bonte	European Championship	Queen's Gambit Declined: Chigorin Defense	
2017	Fier	Tsaghkadzor Open	An instructive strategic win in the Queen's Pawn Game	
2019	Levon Babujian	12th Asrian Memorial	Queen Pawn Game: Symmetrical Variation	
2022	Bizhigitov	Almaty Academy Dec IM	Queen's Gambit Declined: Semi-Tarrasch	
