= Levon Ashotovich Grigorian =

Personal information
- Born: 7 September 1947 Yerevan, Armenian SSR, Soviet Union
- Died: 29 November 1975 (aged 28) Tashkent, Uzbek SSR, Soviet Union

Chess career
- Country: Armenia
- Peak rating: 2490 (July 1972)

Levon Ashotovich Grigorian (7 September 1947 – 29 November 1975), was a Soviet Armenian chess player and son of the poet Ashot Grashi.

He won Armenian Chess Championships in 1964, 1966, 1968, 1969, 1971, 1972 and Uzbekistani Chess Championships in 1974 and 1975.

Grigorian was born in Yerevan, Armenia and died in Tashkent, Uzbekistan. His twin brother Karen Grigorian was a chess International Master.
