= Ludmila Aslanian =

Armenian chess player

Personal information
- Born: Ludmila K. Aslanian; July 2, 1954 (age 72) Ukrainian SSR, Soviet Union

Chess career
- Country: Soviet Union → Armenia
- Title: Woman International Master (1990)
- Peak rating: 2240 (January 1989)

Ludmila Aslanian (Lyudmila Aslanyan, Armenian: Լյուդմիլա Ասլանյան; born 2 July 1954) is an Armenian chess player with the title of Woman International Master (WIM). She is a five time Armenian Women Chess Championship winner (1984, 1986, 1987, 1991, 1992).

== Career ==
Aslanian competed at the 30th Chess Olympiad on board one for Armenia, the first Chess Olympiad of the country. That same year, she also played on board one for the debut of Armenia at the European Team Chess Championship 1992. Aslanian participated at the 31st Chess Olympiad again with Armenia on board two. She also represented the Armenian SSR on board one at the 2nd Soviet Women's Team Chess Championship 1991.
