= Samvel Ter-Sahakyan =

Armenian chess grandmaster (born 1993)

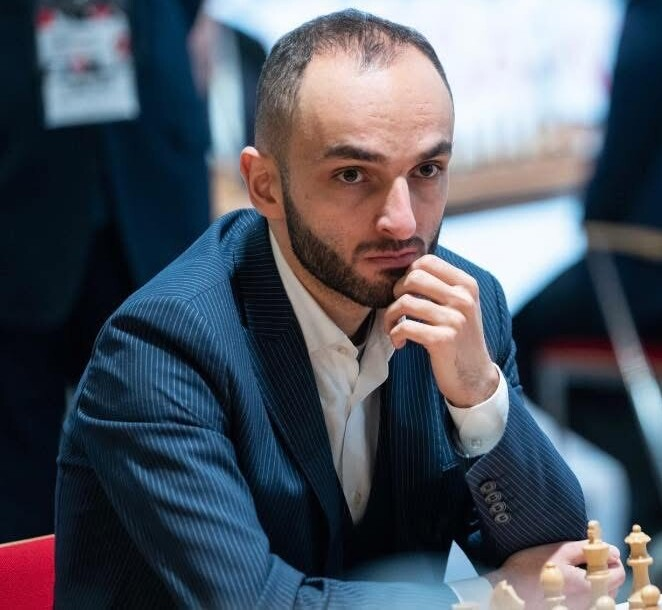

Personal information
- Born: 19 September 1993 (age 32) Vanadzor, Armenia

Chess career
- Country: Armenia
- Title: Grandmaster (2009)
- FIDE rating: 2613 (July 2026)
- Peak rating: 2650 (May 2024)
- Peak ranking: No. 87 (May 2024)

Samvel Ter-Sahakyan (Armenian: Սամվել Ռուբենի Տեր-Սահակյան; born 19 September 1993) is an Armenian chess grandmaster.

== Career ==
He won the 2003 Under 10 and 2009 Under 18 European Youth Chess Championship. He completed the Grandmaster requirements on 18 September 2008 during the European U16 championship, when his rating reached 2500, the title confirmed by FIDE in 2009. At the 2008 World U18 championship, Ter-Sahakyan scored 8 points of 11to finish fourth on tiebreak. He won the 2011 World U18 Chess Championship.

He was second in the 2011 Armenian Chess Championship, behind Robert Hovhannisyan. In 2012, he finished 3rd in the 74th Armenian championship with a score of 6/10 (+3 -1 = 6).

In 2015, Ter-Sahakyan won the Students section of the Moscow Open with 6/9, half a point ahead of Daniil Dubov and finished third on tiebreak with 7/9 at the Karen Asrian Memorial.

=== ProChess League Victory ===
In 2018, Samvel Ter-Sahakyan was a key player for the Armenian Eagles, who won the ProChess League championship in San Francisco, USA. Ter-Sahakyan's strong individual performances contributed significantly to the team's success, and the Armenian Eagles triumphed over top international teams to secure the title.

Armenian Chess Championship

In 2020, Samvel Ter-Sahakyan won the Armenian Chess Championship with a score of 6 out of 9, securing the title of Armenian Chess Champion. Ter-Sahakyan repeated his success in 2023, winning the Armenian Chess Championship for the second time, further cementing his status as one of Armenia's top chess players.

=== Team Achievements ===
At the 44th Chess Olympiad, held in Chennai, India, in 2022, Samvel was a member of the Armenian national team, that secured the silver medal.

Samvel Ter-Sahakyan respresented Armenia at the 2023 European Team Chess Championship, held in Budva, Montenegro. The Armenian team performed admirebly in the Open Section earning bronze medal with 13 match points.

In 2023 playing for the "Naftagas Elimir" team Samvel won the gold medal in the 1st Serbian League.

In 2024 Samvel was a team member of AX Gaia, which won all nine matches, successfully defended their title and claimed victory in the Portuguese League, held in Soure, Portugal.
