= Albert Arutiunov =

Armenian chess player

Albert Arutiunov (1930–2014) was an Armenian chess master and a chess coach who has won the Armenian Chess Championship twice, in 1973 and 1977. He was a Honoured Coach of Armenia.

One of his notable games is with future World Chess champion Tigran Petrosian:

== Notable games ==
Tigran Petrosian – Albert Arutiunov, Tbilisi, 1945

1.e4 e6 2.d4 d5 3.Nd2 dxe4 4.Nxe4 Nd7 5.Nf3 Ngf6 6.Bd3 Be7 7.O-O O-O 8.Ng3 c5 9.c3 Qc7 10.Qe2 Rd8 11.Ne5 Nf8 12.dxc5 Qxc5 13.Bf4 Bd7 14.Ne4 Nxe4 15.Bxe4 Bb5 16.c4 Ba6 17.b4 Qxb4 18.Rab1 Qc5 19.Bxb7 Bxb7 20.Rxb7 Bd6 21.Rfb1 Bxe5 22.Bxe5 Ng6 23.Bg3 Rac8 24.h3 a6 25.R1b6 Qxc4 26.Qxc4 Rxc4 27.Rb8 Rdc8 28.Rxa6 Rxb8 29.Bxb8 e5 30.Ra8 Rc8 31.a4 Nf8 32.a5 Nd7 33.a6 Rf8 0–1
