= Siranush Andriasian =

Armenian chess International Master

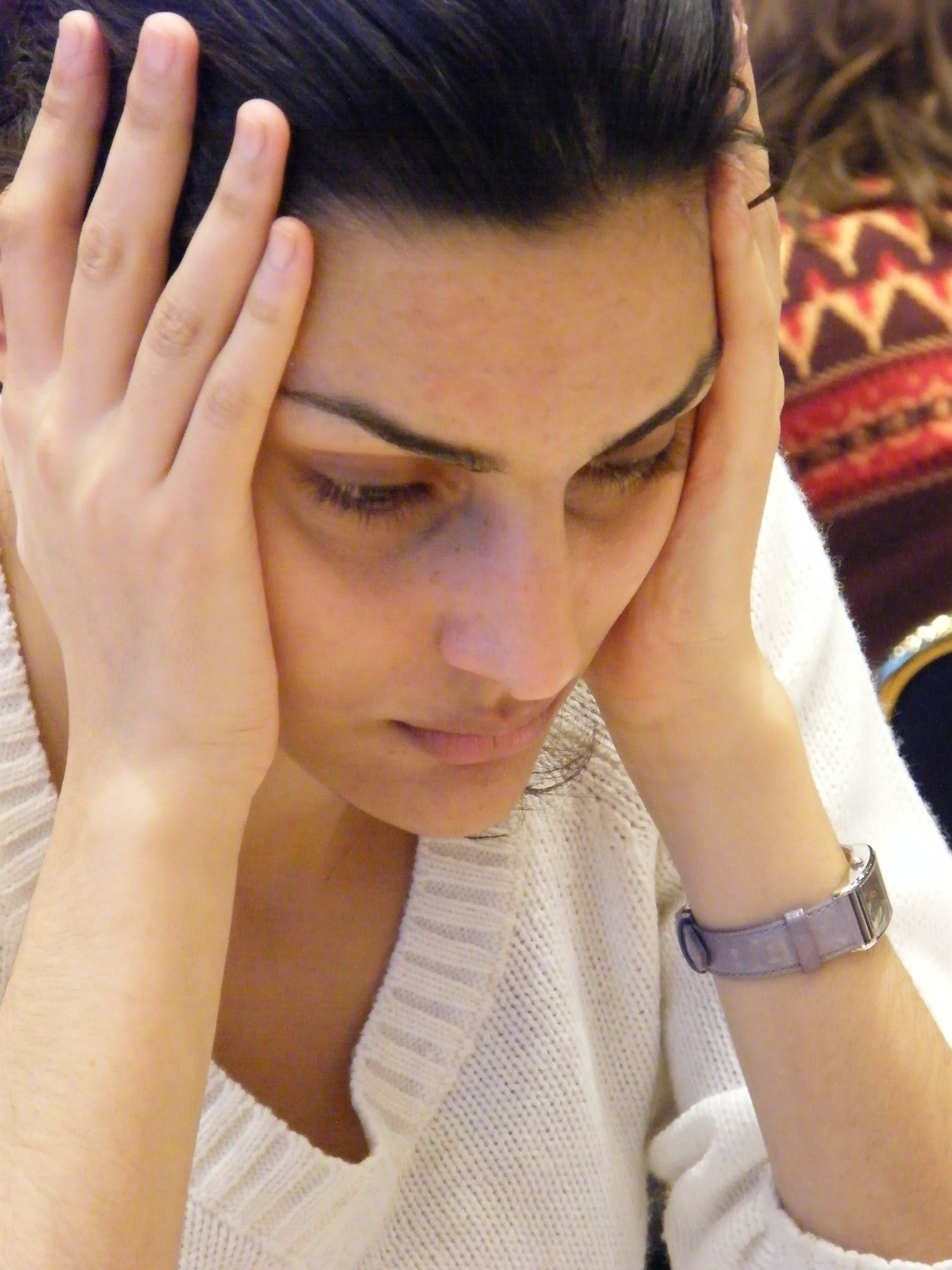
- Andriasian in 2008

Personal information
- Born: Սիրանուշ Անդրիասյան; January 4, 1986 (age 40) Ejmiatsin, Armenia

Chess career
- Country: Armenia
- Title: Woman International Master (2005)
- Peak rating: 2300 (December 2019)

Siranush Andriasian (Armenian: Սիրանուշ Անդրիասյան, born 4 January 1986) is an Armenian chess International Master. She is a three-time Armenian Women Chess Champion and has won a bronze medal at the European Team Chess Championship for Armenia.

== Career ==
Andriasian was awarded the FIDE Woman International Master title in 2005. She won the under-10 girls Armenian Championship in 1994 and 1995, the under-14 girls Armenian Championship in 1999 and 2000, and the under-18 girls Armenian Championship in 2001 and 2004. At the under-10 European Youth Chess Championship, Andriasian came in third place. Andriasian won the senior Armenian Chess Championship thrice in 2006, 2007 and 2011. She was also the runner-up in 2004 and 2005.

She won a bronze medal with the Armenia women national chess team at the European Team Chess Championship 2007. Andriasian also competed at the European Team Championship in 2005 and 2009 and at the World Team Chess Championship in 2007 and 2009. At the Chess Olympiad, Andriasian represented the Armenian team at the 36th Chess Olympiad, 37th Chess Olympiad and 38th Chess Olympiad.

== Achievements ==
- 1994, 1995: Won Girls Under-10 Armenian Championship;
- 1995: Third place in European Youth Chess Championship, Under-10;
- 1999, 2000: Won Girls Under-14 Armenian Championship;
- 2001, 2004: Won Girls Under-18 Armenian Championship;
- 2004: Became women's Vice-champion of Armenia;
- 2005: 3rd place at the women's championship of Armenia;
- 2006, 2007, 2011: Women's Champion of Armenia;
- 2007: Bronze medal at the European Team Chess Championship.
