= Karen Grigorian =

Armenian chess player

Personal information
- Born: Karen Ashotovich Grigorian; 7 September 1947 Moscow, Russian SFSR, Soviet Union
- Died: 30 October 1989 (aged 42) Yerevan, Armenian SSR, Soviet Union

Chess career
- Title: International Master (1982)
- Peak rating: 2520 (May 1974)
- Peak ranking: No. 59 (January 1975)

Karen Ashotovich Grigorian (7 September 1947 – 30 October 1989) was an Armenian chess master, and son of the poet Ashot Grashi.

Born in Moscow, Russia, Grigorian won the Armenian Chess Championship three times (joint winner 1969, winner 1971, joint winner 1972), and the Moscow City Chess Championship twice (1975, 1979). He also participated in six USSR Chess Championships between 1971 and 1977, with his best performances being at the 1973 USSR Chess Championships, in which he finished at the 7th-8th place. He was awarded the International Master title in 1982.

Grigorian's trainers included Lev Aronin, and he was friends with the Latvian chess master Alvis Vītoliņš. Grigorian and Vitolins were excellent blitz players, but both also suffered from psychiatric disorders. At the age of 42, Grigorian committed suicide by jumping from the Great Bridge of Hrazdan, Yerevan.

His brother Levon Grigorian was also a chess player and won several chess championships.
