= Anna Hairapetian =

Armenian chess player

Personal information
- Born: September 8, 1989 (age 36)

Chess career
- Country: Armenia
- Title: Woman International Master (2011)
- Peak rating: 2227 (March 2012)

Anna Hairapetian (Armenian: Աննա Վլադիմիրի Հայրապետյան; born September 8, 1989) is an Armenian chess player holding the title of Woman International Master (WIM) and a former Armenian women's champion.

== Career ==
Hairapetian won the Armenian Women's Chess Championship in 2013. She competed at the 40th Chess Olympiad for Armenia. She also competed at the 2013 European Team Chess Championship, in which the Armenian women's team finished 5th.
