= Sergey Galdunts =

Armenian chess player

Personal information
- Born: January 17, 1965 (age 61) Baku, Azerbaijan SSR, Soviet Union

Chess career
- Country: Armenia
- Title: Grandmaster (2003)
- Peak rating: 2514 (July 2001)

Sergey Galdunts (Armenian: Սերգեյ Գալդունց, born January 17, 1965) is an Armenian chess Grandmaster (2003). He won the Armenian Chess Championship in 1991 and played for Armenia-3 in the 32nd Chess Olympiad.

== Achievements ==
- 1994: Second at Wiesbaden Open
- 1999: Won the Bischwiller-A tournament
- 2000: Second at Gold Coast Parkroyal Open
