= Avetik Grigoryan =

Armenian chess player

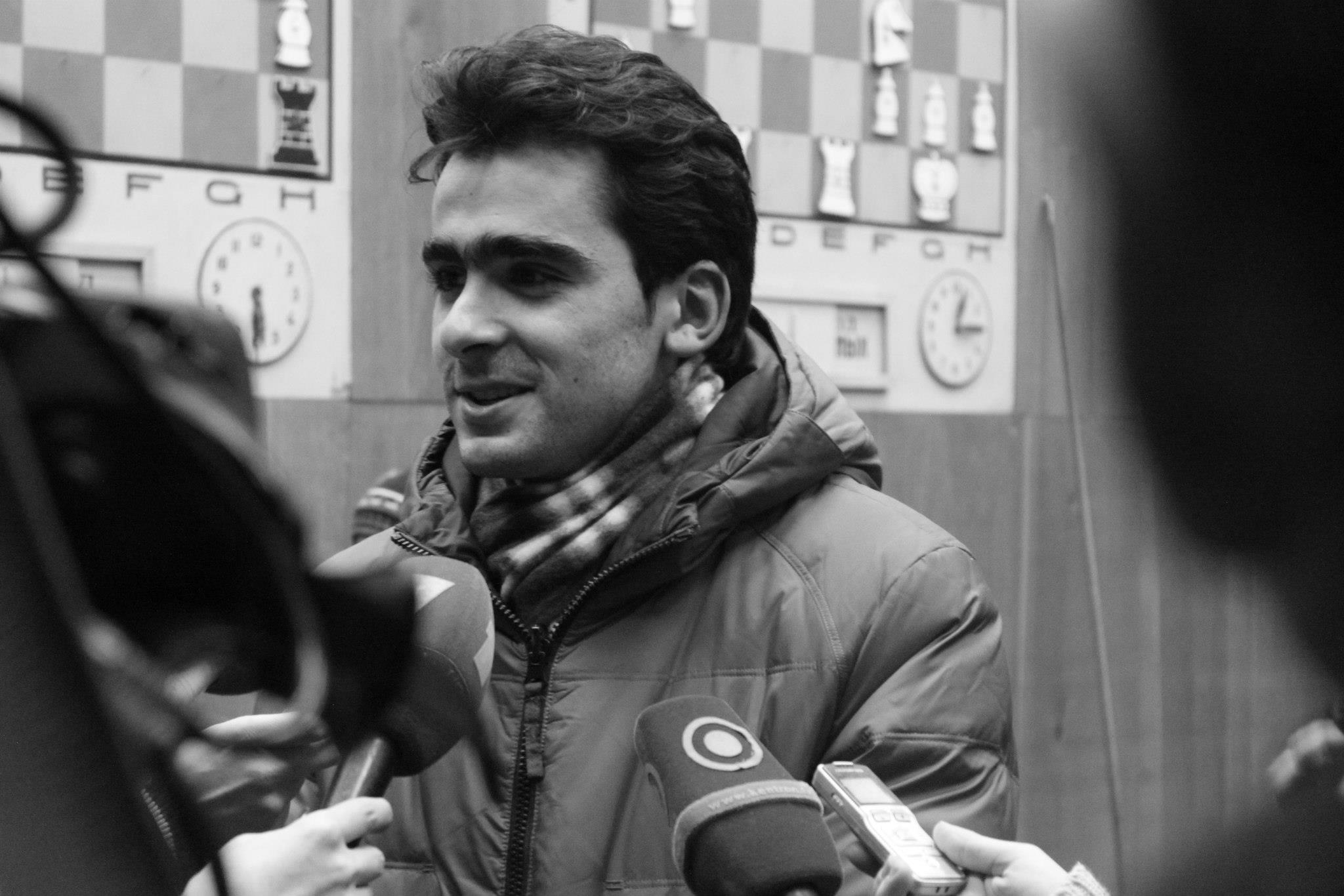
- Grigoryan in 2013

Personal information
- Born: Avetik Nikolayi Grigoryan; January 27, 1989 (age 37) Yerevan, Armenia

Chess career
- Country: Armenia
- Title: Grandmaster (2008)
- FIDE rating: 2561 (August 2026)
- Peak rating: 2622 (November 2011)

Avetik Nikolayi Grigoryan (Armenian: Ավետիք Նիկոլայի Գրիգորյան, born January 27, 1989) is an Armenian chess Grandmaster (2008). He was born in Yerevan, Armenia in 1989. He achieved his International Master title at the age of 18 and became a Grandmaster at 19. He is the founder and CEO of ChessMood, a chess education company.

== Achievements ==
- 2004, 2006, 2007: Won Armenian Youth Championship
- 2006: Won Yerevan Rapid Chess Cup
- 2006: Second at European Rapid Chess Championship
- 2007: Fourth at World Youth Chess Championship, under-18
- 2008: Second at Belgorod Open
- 2008: Second at Fajr Open
- 2010: Won Armenian Chess Championship
- 2010: Won the Bansko Grand Chess Open
- 2011: Tied for 3rd–15th in the open section of the 15th Corsican Circuit
- 2012: Won the Pavlodar Open
- 2015-2016: Director at Yerevan Arabkir Children and Youth Chess School
- 2017- 2018: Coach of Thailand Chess National Team

He competed in the 2010 Chess Olympiad.
