= Lilit Galojan =

Armenian chess player

Lilit Galojan Լիլիթ Գալոյան
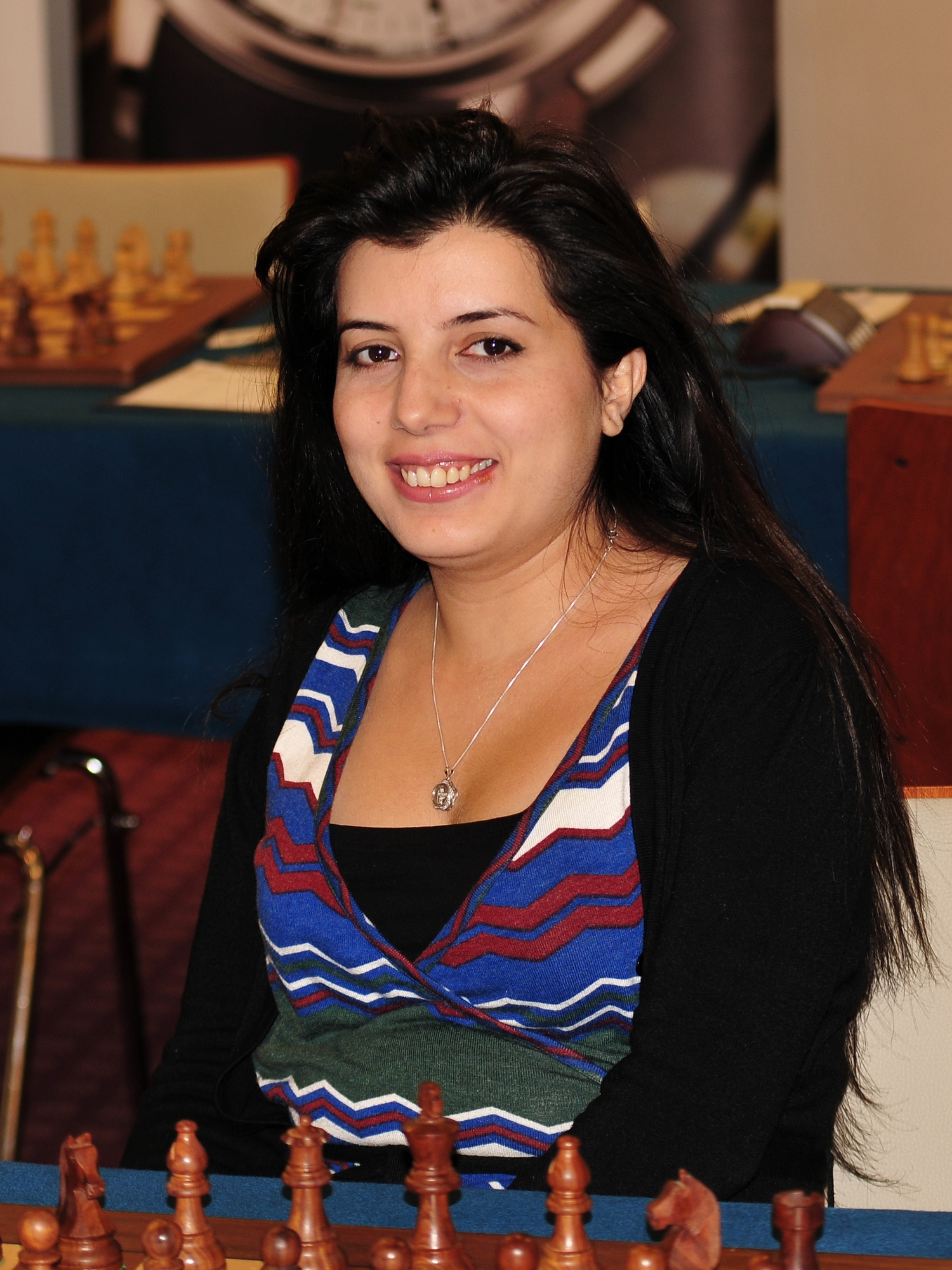
- Lilit Galojan at the European Chess Team Championship, Warsaw 2013

Personal information
- Born: 17 June 1983 (age 43) Yerevan, Armenian SSR, Soviet Union

Chess career
- Country: Armenia
- Title: International Master (2010); Woman Grandmaster (2009)
- FIDE rating: 2285 (February 2018)
- Peak rating: 2402 (May 2010)

Lilit Galojan (Armenian: Լիլիթ Գալոյան; born 17 June 1983) is an Armenian chess player who became a Woman Grandmaster 2009 and International Master since 2010. She is a two-time Armenian Women Chess Champion.

== Career ==
Galojan became an International Master in May 2010 and a Woman Grandmaster in 2009. She won the Armenian U12 Champion in 1995, the Armenian U14 Champion in 1997, the Armenian U16 Champion in 1998 and the Armenian U18 Champion in 1999. Galojan won the senior Armenian Chess Championship twice in 2008 and 2009. At the Fajr Women Open 2007, Galojan came in first place. Playing for the Armenian women's team, she has competed at the 35th Chess Olympiad, 38th Chess Olympiad, 39th Chess Olympiad, 40th Chess Olympiad and 41st Chess Olympiad. Galojan also represented Armenia at the World Team Chess Championships for Women in 2009, 2011 and 2015 and at the European Team Chess Championships in 2005, 2009, 2011, 2013, 2015 and 2017.
