= Eduard Mnatsakanian =

Armenian chess player

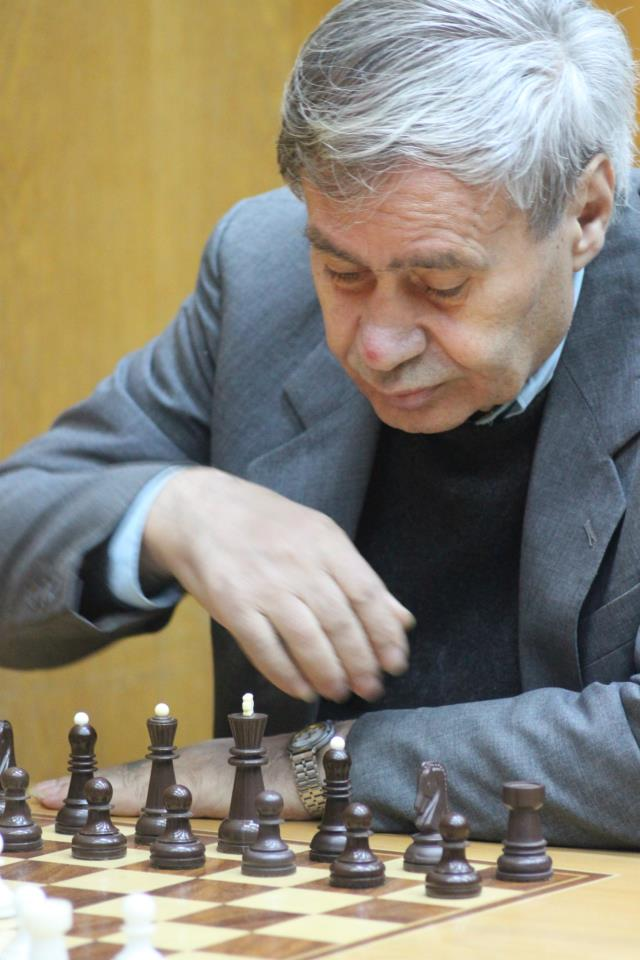

Personal information
- Born: 6 December 1938 Yerevan, Armenia
- Died: 18 January 2016 (aged 77) Yerevan, Armenia

Chess career
- Country: Armenia
- Title: International Master (1978)
- Peak rating: 2450 (January 1981)

Eduard Mnatsakanian (Armenian: Էդուարդ Մնացականյան; December 6, 1938 – January 18, 2016) was an Armenian chess International Master (1978), and between 1958 and 1985, one of the leading Armenian players. He was Armenian champion in 1958, 1959, 1960, 1962, and 1967.

== Achievements ==
- 1979: Third at Starý Smokovec
- 1986: Third at Varna
