= Davit G. Petrosian =

Armenian chess grandmaster (born 1984)

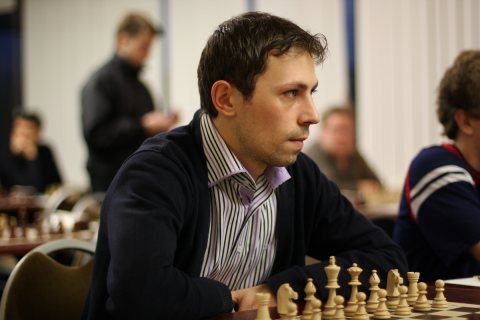

Personal information
- Born: Davit Gevorkovich Petrosian; 20 September 1984 (age 41) Yerevan, Armenian SSR, Soviet Union

Chess career
- Country: Armenia
- Title: Grandmaster (2009)
- FIDE rating: 2437 (July 2026)
- Peak rating: 2504 (September 2009)

Davit Gevorkovich Petrosian (Armenian: Դավիթ Գ. Պետրոսյան; born 20 September 1984) is an Armenian chess Grandmaster (2009).

In 2006 he won the B section of the Aeroflot Open. In 2008 he came first in the Autumn-1 Alushta tournament and in the first league of the Armenian Chess Championship. In November 2010, he came third in the Armenian 1st League, which acts as a qualifier to the national Championship. In January 2012 he came fifth in the Andranik Margaryan Memorial.

== Notable games ==
- Davit Petrosian vs Mateusz Bartel, European Championship 2010, Four Knights (C47), 1-0
- Davit Petrosian vs Artashes Minasian, European Championship 2010, Caro-Kann Defense: Advance Variation (B12), 1-0
