= Susanna Gaboyan =

Armenian chess player (born 1996)

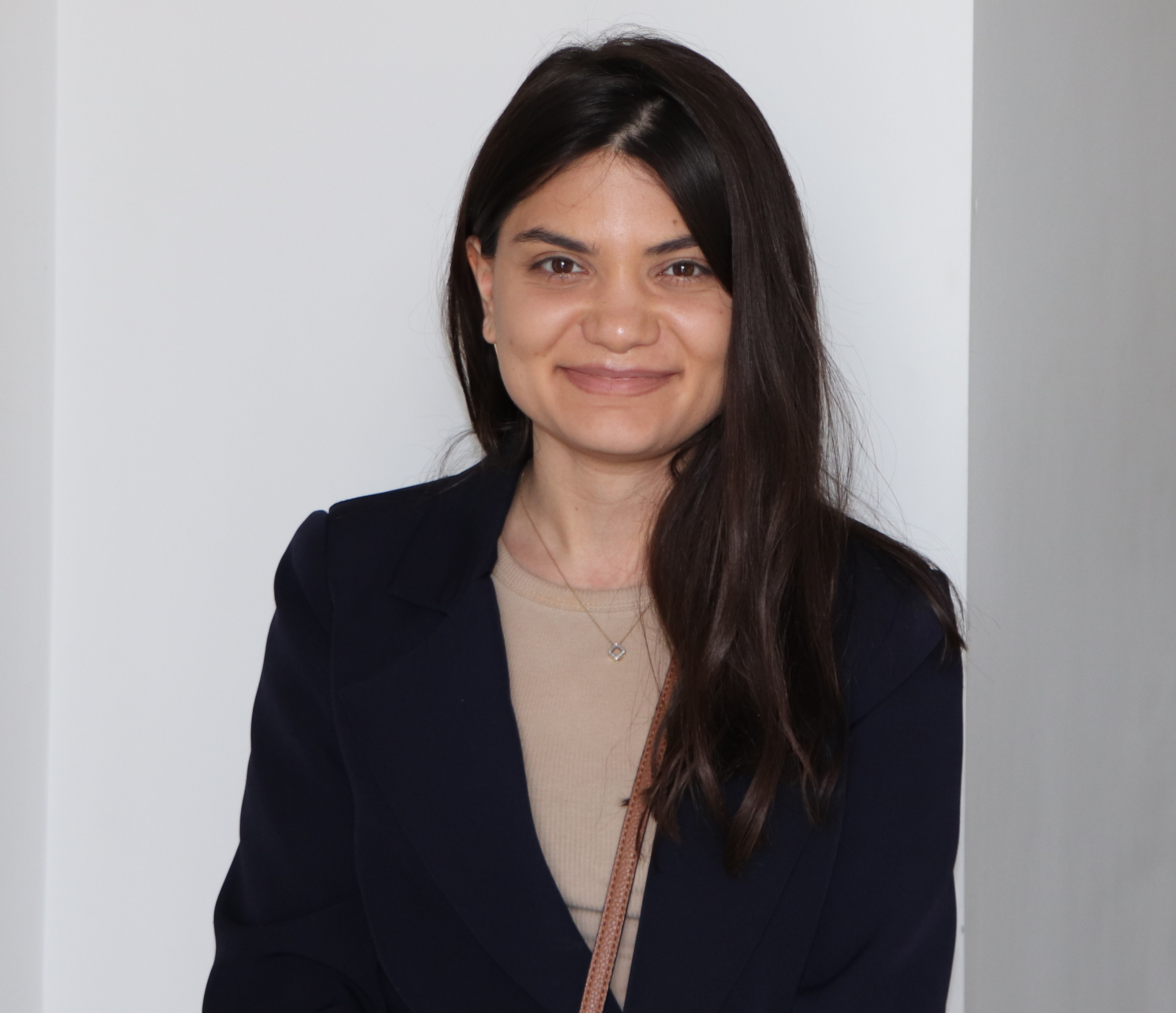
- Susanna Gaboyan in 2022

Personal information
- Born: 25 August 1996 (age 30)

Chess career
- Country: Armenia
- Title: Woman International Master (2018)
- Peak rating: 2274 (September 2022)

Susanna Gaboyan (Armenian: Սուսաննա Գաբոյան; born 25 August 1996) is an Armenian chess player who holds the title of Woman International Master (2018). She four times won Armenian Women's Chess Championships (2015, 2021, 2024, 2025).

== Biography ==
Susanna Gaboyan regularly participates in the finals of the Armenian Women's Chess Championships. In this tournaments she won four gold (2015, 2021, 2024, 2025), four silver (2019, 2020, 2022, 2023) and two bronze (2016, 2017) medals.

Susanna Gaboyan played for Armenia in the Women's Chess Olympiads:

- In 2022, at reserve board in the 44th Chess Olympiad (women) in Chennai (+5, =2, -1),
- In 2024, at reserve board in the 45th Chess Olympiad (women) in Budapest (+1, =1, -0).

Susanna Gaboyan played for Armenia in the European Women's Team Chess Championships:

- In 2021, at fourth board in the 14th European Team Chess Championship (women) in Čatež ob Savi (+3, =1, -2),
- In 2023, at reserve board in the 15th European Team Chess Championship (women) in Budva (+1, =3, -1).

In 2018, she was awarded the FIDE Women International Master (WIM) title.
