= Arshak Petrosian =

Armenian chess player

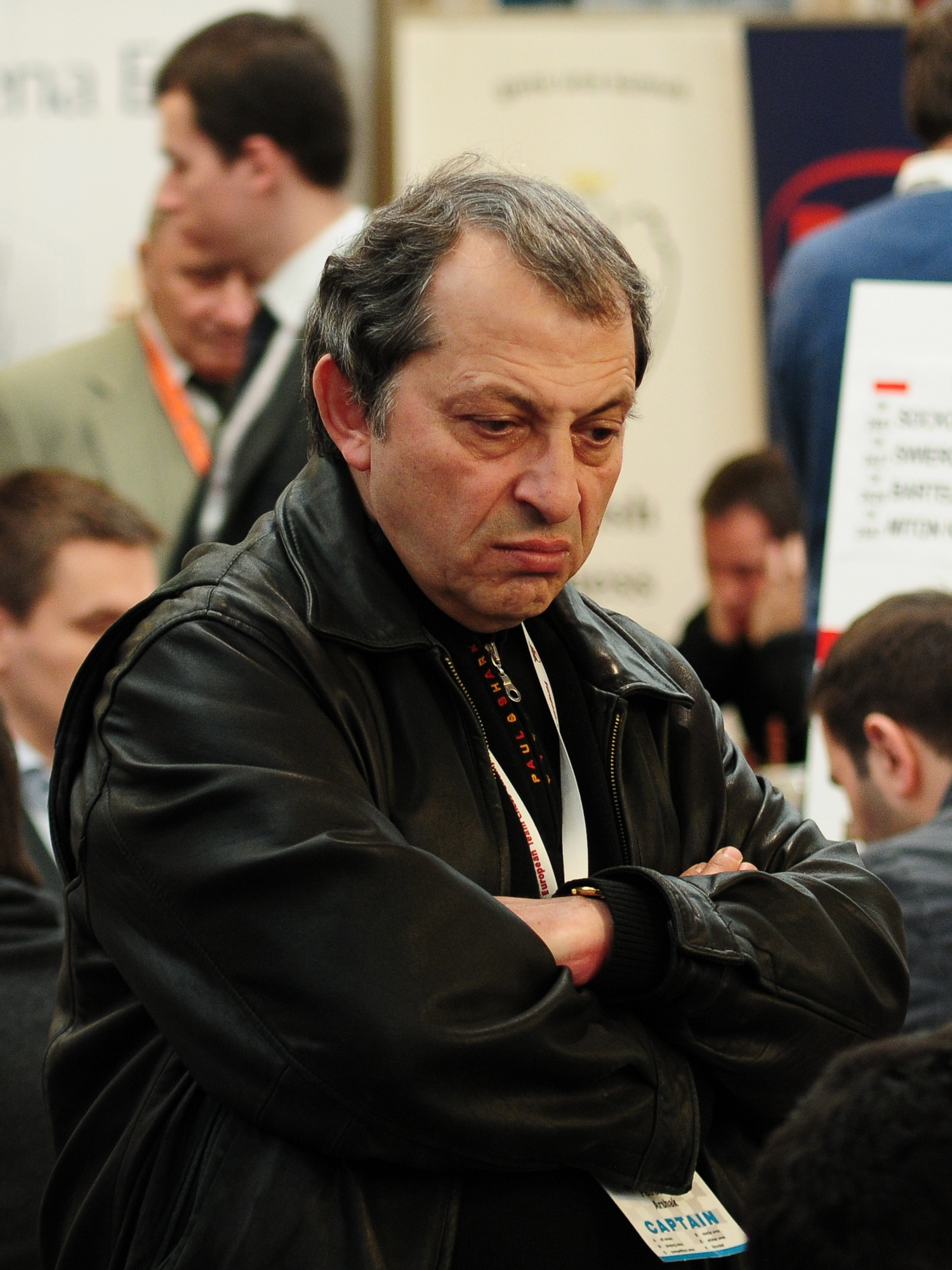
- Arshak Petrosian, Warsaw 2013

Personal information
- Born: December 16, 1953 (age 72)

Chess career
- Country: Armenia
- Title: Grandmaster (1984)
- FIDE rating: 2475 (July 2026)
- Peak rating: 2514 (July 1999)

Arshak B. Petrosian (Armenian: Արշակ Պետրոսյան; born December 16, 1953) is an Armenian chess player and National Coach. FIDE awarded him the Grandmaster title in 1984. He won the Armenian Chess Championship in 1974 and 1976. He became a prominent Soviet tournament player during the 1980s, winning games against such noted grandmasters as Alexey Shirov, Rafael Vaganian, and Alexander Morozevich. More recently he has served as a trainer and mentor to his son-in-law, Péter Lékó. His current Elo rating is 2470, although he has been inactive for at least five years.

Arshak Petrosian is not related to Tigran Petrosian, also Armenian, who was World Chess Champion from 1963 to 1969.

== Awards ==
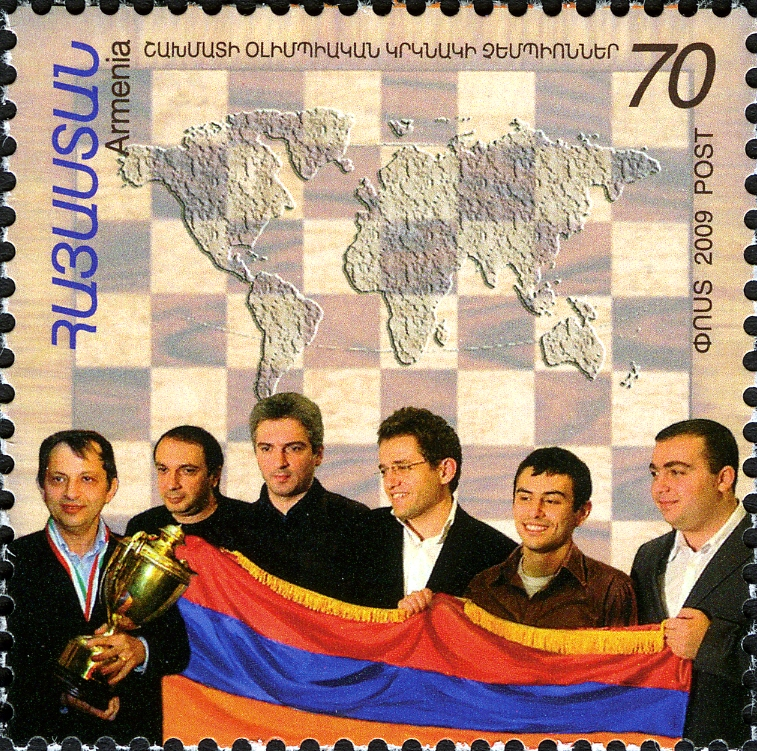
Arshak Petrosian (1st left) with his 2008 Olympiad team on a 2009 stamp of Armenia

- 2009 – Mikhail Botvinnik Medal.
- 2012 – Order of St. Mesrop Mashtots.

== Notable games ==
Petrosian vs. Shirov, Daugavpils 1989

Position: a8 black rook, g8 black king, b7 black pawn, f7 white queen, g7 black bishop, d6 white knight, f6 black knight, a5 black pawn, c5 black pawn, c4 white pawn, g4 black queen, a2 white pawn, b2 white pawn, c2 white bishop, g2 white pawn, c1 white king, d1 white rook

Final position

A. Petrosian–A. Shirov, Daugavpils 1989
1.d4 Nf6 2.c4 g6 3.Nc3 Bg7 4.e4 d6 5.Be2 0-0 6.Bg5 h6 7.Be3 e5 8.d5 Nbd7 9.Qd2 Nc5 10.f3 a5 11.Bd1 Nh5 12.Nge2 f5 13.Bc2 Qh4+ 14.Bf2 Qg5 15.Rg1 Nf6 16.Ng3 f4 17.Nge2 Qh5 18.h4 g5 19.hxg5 hxg5 20.0-0-0 g4 21.Rh1 Qf7 22.Nxf4 exf4 23.Bxc5 dxc5 24.e5 Re8 25.Qxf4 Ra6 26.e6 Bxe6 27.dxe6 Qxe6 28.fxg4 Qxg4 29.Qxc7 Qc8 30.Qg3 Qg4 31.Qc7 Qc8 32.Nb5 Rf8 33.Qg3 Rd8 34.Qg6 Rxd1+ 35.Rxd1 Ra8 36.Nd6 Qg4 37.Qf7+ 1–0
