= Maria Gevorgyan =

Armenian chess player

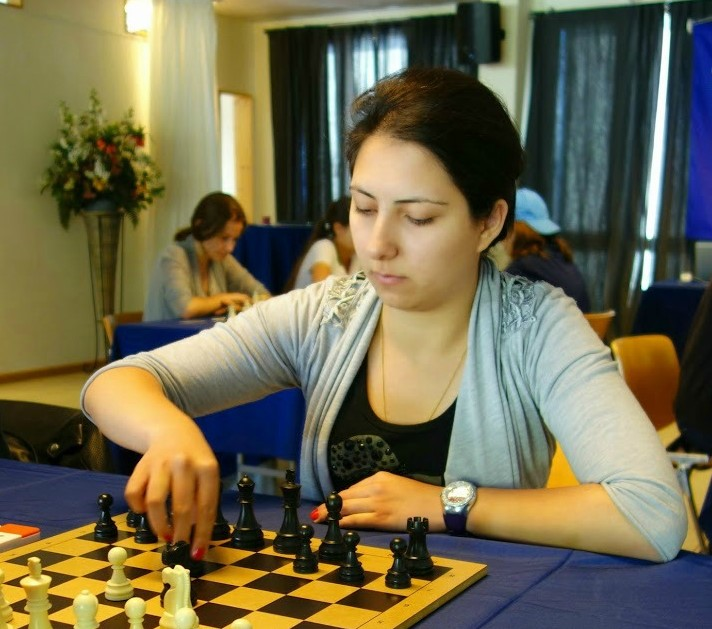
- Gevorgyan in 2014

Personal information
- Born: 21 December 1994 (age 31) Yerevan, Armenia

Chess career
- Country: Armenia
- Title: Woman Grandmaster (2019)
- Peak rating: 2294 (September 2017)

Maria Gevorgyan (Armenian: Մարիա Գևորգյան; born 21 December 1994) is an Armenian chess player who holds the title of Woman Grandmaster (WGM, 2019). She is a five-time Armenian Women Chess Champion (2016, 2017, 2019, 2020, 2023).

== Chess career ==
At age three she learned to play chess from her grandfather, sports journalist Derenik Gevorgyan. From the age of seven Gevorgyan attended chess school and then chess academy. In 2011, in Albena, she placed 3rd in the European Youth Chess Championship in the girls U18 category. In 2012, Gevorgyan won the Armenian Chess Championship in the girls U18 category and finished 12th in the individual European Youth Chess Rapid Championship in the girls U18 category.

In 2014 and 2015, Gevorgyan was the Armenian Women Chess Vice-champion. In the 71st Armenian Women's Chess Championship in 2016, she scored 8.5 points out of 9 and won the tournament. In January 2017, Gevorgyan scored 6½ points out of 9, and defended her title of women's champion of Armenia. She also won the Armenian Women's Chess Championship in 2019, 2020 and 2023
