= Arman Pashikian =

Armenian chess grandmaster (born 1987)

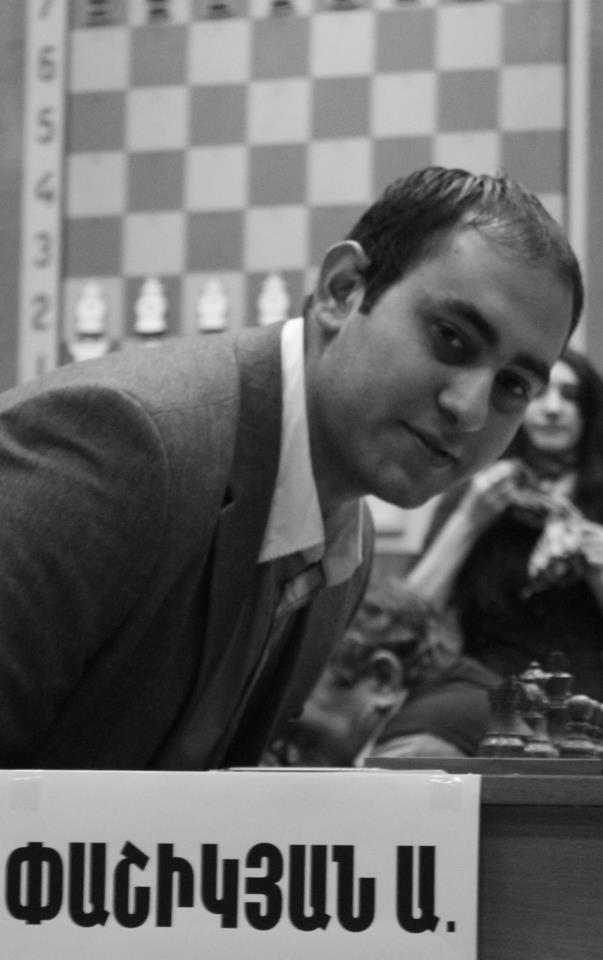

Personal information
- Born: Արման Փաշիկյան; 28 July 1987 (age 38) Irkutsk, Russia
- Spouse: Maria Kursova

Chess career
- Country: Armenia
- Title: Grandmaster (2007)
- FIDE rating: 2594 (July 2026)
- Peak rating: 2663 (September 2009)
- Peak ranking: No. 70 (September 2009)

Arman Pashikian (Armenian: Արման Փաշիկյան; born 28 July 1987, Irkutsk, Russia) is an Armenian chess Grandmaster. He was the Armenian Youth Champion in 1997 and 1998, winning also a silver medal in 1999 (under-12) and in 2001 (under-14). He also took the fourth place in the European Youth Chess Championship. In 2003 Pashikian shared the first two places in the Armenian Chess Championship and in 2009 and 2019 won the title. In 2005 he received the gold medal of the European Youth Rapid Chess Championship.

Pashikian played for Armenia in the 39th Chess Olympiad in Khanty-Mansiysk. He took part in the Chess World Cup 2011 but was eliminated in the first round by Radosław Wojtaszek.

In February 2012 he came first in the 2nd Ferdowsi Open in Mashhad.

He is married to WGM Maria Kursova.
