= Narek Seferjan =

Armenian chess grandmaster (born 1974)

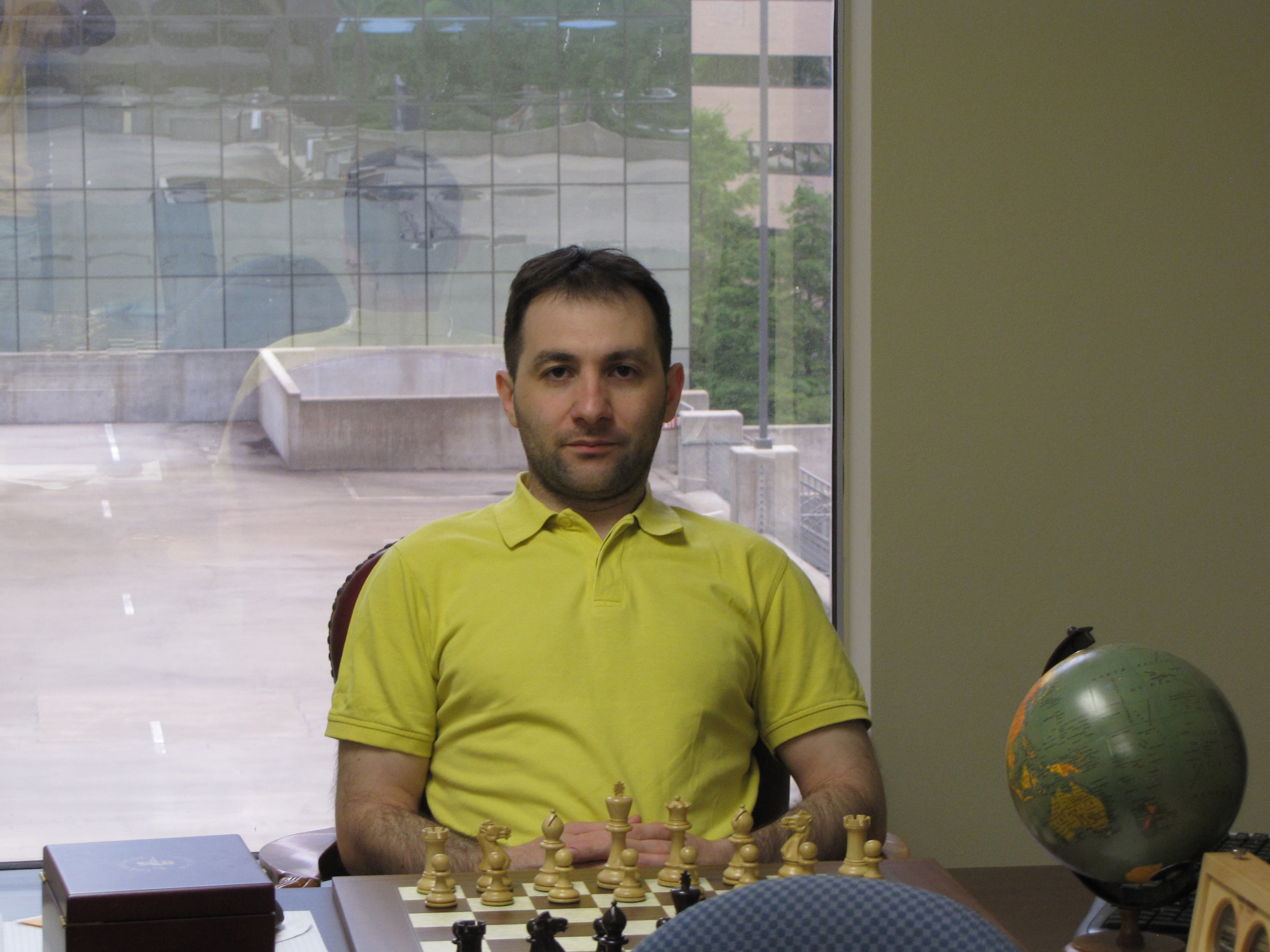

Personal information
- Born: August 20, 1974 (age 51) Moscow, USSR

Chess career
- Country: Armenia
- Title: Grandmaster (1998)
- FIDE rating: 2416 (July 2026)
- Peak rating: 2541 (July 2002)

Narek Seferjan (born August 20, 1974) is a Russian-Armenian chess Grandmaster, journalist and script writer. Seferjan graduated from the Russian State University of Physical Culture and Diplomatic Academy of the Ministry of Foreign Affairs of the Russian Federation.

== Chess achievements ==
Prize winner of such international tournaments as:

- Moscow Youth Champion – 1987
- U.S. Open Concord, USA – 1995
- North American Open – 1995
- Seventh Goldberg Memorial, Moscow – 1996
- Twelfth Goldberg Memorial, Moscow – 1998
- Moscow International – 1998
- Estrin Memorial – 1998

== Journalist ==
Correspondent and observer for numerous print media, worked in war zones. Sphere of interest – international affairs. TV correspondent since 2003. 2006 – international observer for «Rossija 24» TV News Channel.

== Businessman ==
2014 - deputy director of a joint-stock logistics company.
