= David Markosian =

Armenian chess grandmaster (born 1972)

Personal information
- Born: January 24, 1972 (age 54) Stepanakert, Azerbaijan SSR

Chess career
- Country: Armenia
- Title: Grandmaster (2008)
- Peak rating: 2501 (April 2008)

David Sergeyi Markosyan (Armenian: Դավիթ Սերգեևիչ Մարկոսյան; born January 24, 1972, in Stepanakert, NKAO, Azerbaijan SSR) is an Armenian grandmaster. He taught at the Grandmaster Bareev School.

== Biography ==
Markosyan earned the title of International Master in 2000 and the title of International Grandmaster in 2008. Until 2003, he taught in Tambov.

He is the founder of the chess school-studio "Defeat the Giant" in Moscow.

Markosyan won the international tournament in Davos in 2008. Since 2010, he has fully transitioned to coaching. His coaching work is influenced by psychotherapeutic techniques that help children overcome psychological difficulties.
