= Goar Hlgatian =

Armenian chess player

Goar Hlgatian (Armenian: Գոհար Հլղաթյան; born 14 May 1975) is an Armenian chess player. She is a Woman International Master (WIM) since 1996 and three-time Armenian Women's chess champion (1996, 1997 and 2001).
