= Maria Kursova =

Russian-Armenian chess player (born 1986)

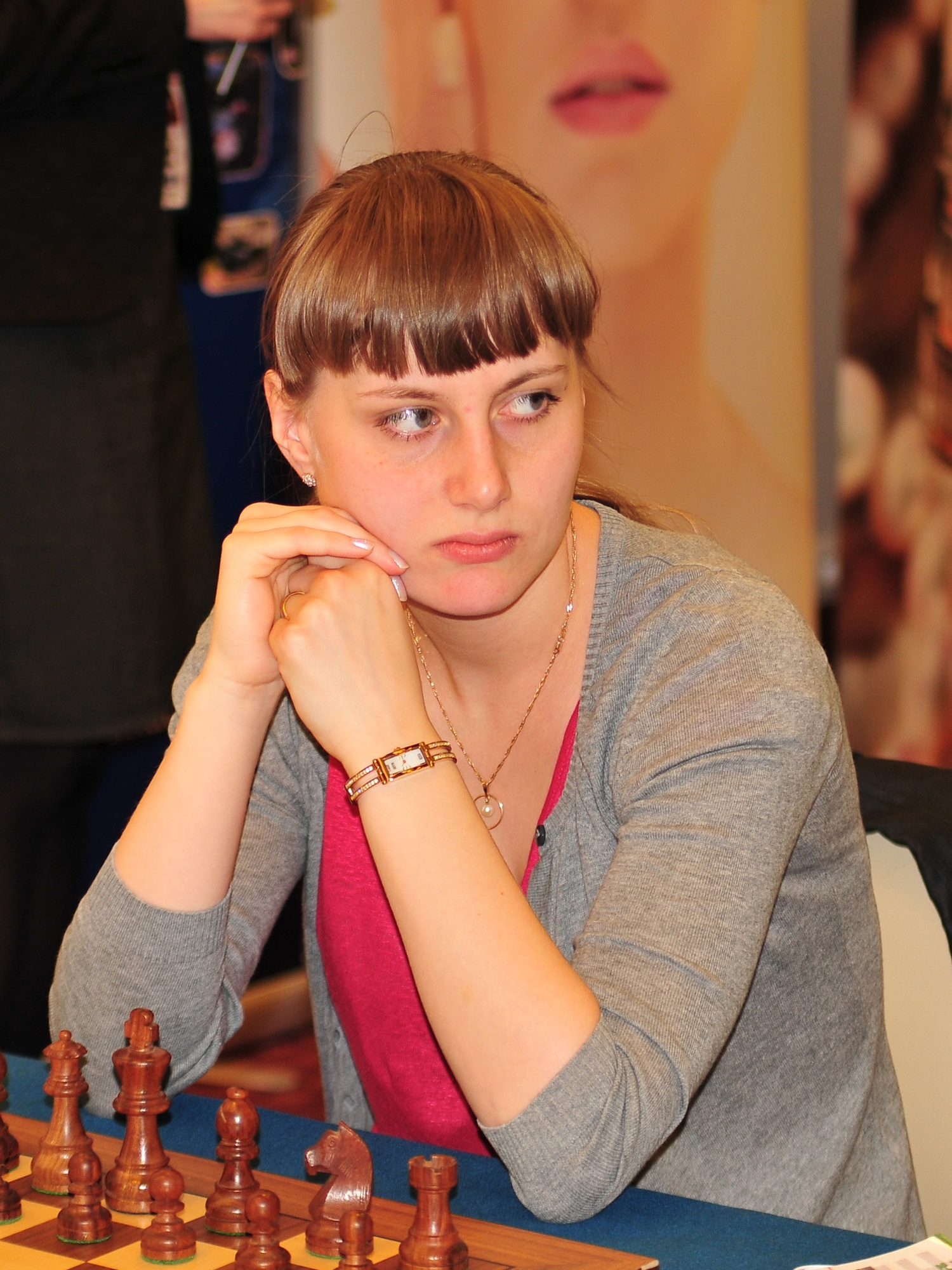
- Kursova at the European Team Championships in Warsaw 2013

Personal information
- Born: 3 January 1986 (age 40) Severodvinsk, Russian SFSR, Soviet Union
- Spouse: Arman Pashikian

Chess career
- Country: Russia (until 2011); Armenia (since 2011)
- Title: Woman Grandmaster (2007)
- Peak rating: 2366 (July 2007)

Maria Kursova (Russian: Мария Курсова, Armenian: Մարիա Կուրսովա; born 3 January 1986) is a Russian-Armenian chess player. She was awarded the title of Woman Grandmaster by FIDE in 2007. Kursova was the world girls champion and European girls champion in her age category.

== Career ==
Born in Severodvinsk, Kursova won the World Youth Chess Championships in the Girls U10 category in 1996. She also won three medals at the European Youth Chess Championships: in 1998 she took the bronze medal in the Girls U12 section, three years later Kursova won the Girls U16 title, and in 2003 she tied with Natalia Pogonina for first place, placing second on countback, in the Girls U18 event.

Kursova competed in the Women's World Chess Championship 2006 as one of the FIDE president nominees. Kursova defeated Zhao Xue in the first round to advance to the second. She lost to Ekaterina Kovalevskaya and was therefore eliminated from the competition.

Kursova switched her national federation to Armenia in 2011, competing for Armenia at the 40th Chess Olympiad, World Team Chess Championship 2011 and European Team Chess Championship 2011. She now lives in Yerevan. She won the Armenian women's championship in 2012 and 2018. Kursova played for the Armenian team in the Women's Chess Olympiad, Women's World Team Chess Championship, and Women's European Team Chess Championship.

== Personal life ==
She is married to Grandmaster Arman Pashikian.
