= Robert Hovhannisyan =

Armenian chess grandmaster (born 1991)

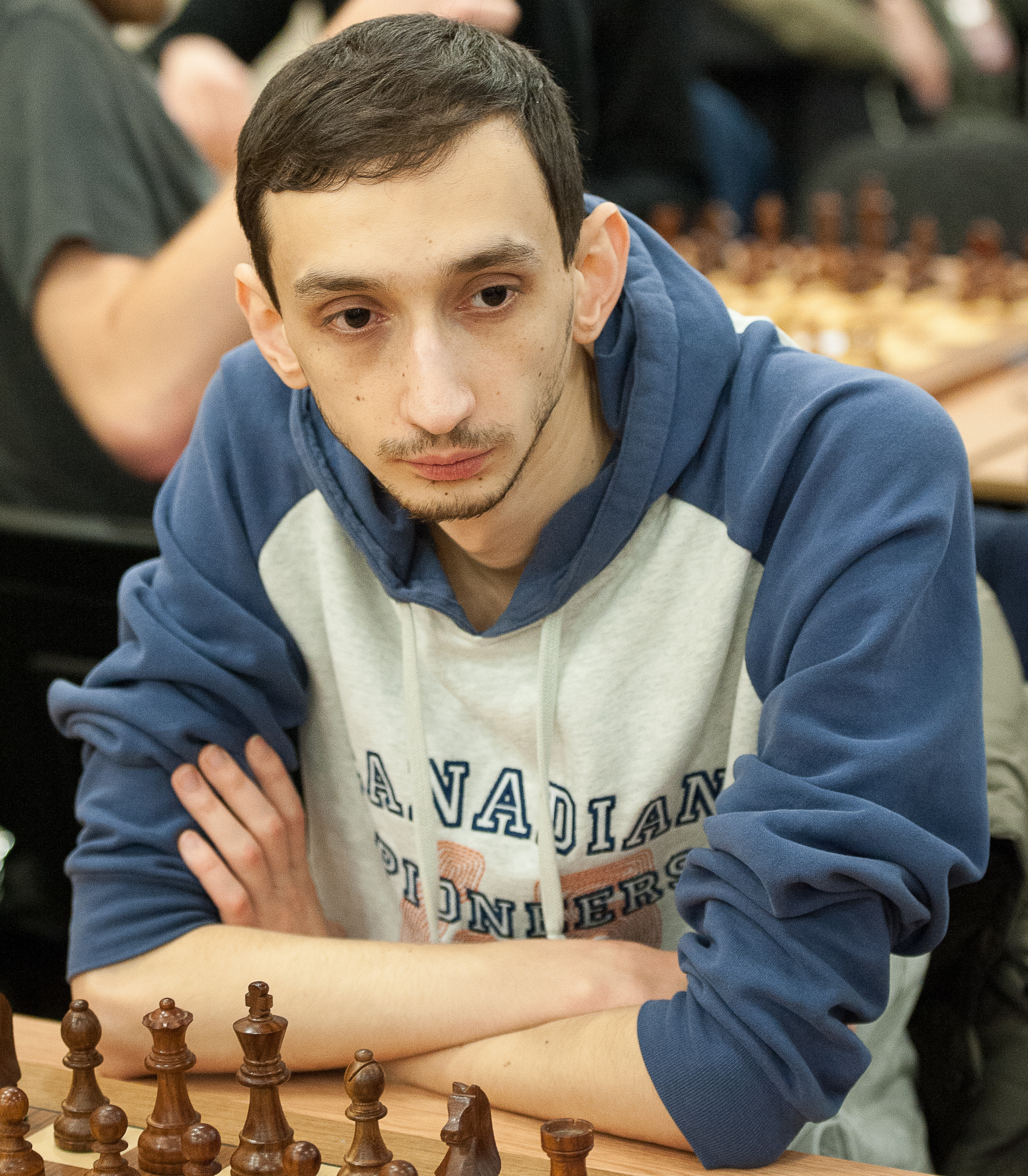
- Robert Hovhannisyan, 2016

Personal information
- Born: 23 March 1991 (age 35) Yerevan, Armenian SSR, Soviet Union

Chess career
- Country: Armenia
- Title: Grandmaster (2010)
- FIDE rating: 2642 (October 2026)
- Peak rating: 2650 (August 2019)
- Ranking: No. 76 (October 2026)
- Peak ranking: No. 76 (October 2026)

Robert Ararati Hovhannisyan (Armenian: Ռոբերտ Արարատի Հովհաննիսյան; born 23 March 1991) is an Armenian chess player. He was awarded the title Grandmaster by FIDE in 2010.

== Career ==
In January 2011, Hovhannisyan won the 71st Armenian Chess Championship which he won again in 2024 and 2025 In July he was a member of the gold-medal winning Armenian team at the World Team Chess Championship in Ningbo. The following month, Hovhannisyan tied for first place with Dariusz Świercz in the World Junior Chess Championship in Chennai, placing second on tiebreak. In November, he played again on the Armenian team in the European Team Chess Championship, in which his team finished fourth. In January 2012, Hovhannisyan took second place in the Armenian championship. In 2013 he won the 6th Karen Asrian Memorial in Jermuk.

In 2015 Hovhannisyan tied for first with Alexei Shirov in the 5th Riga Technical University Open in Riga, finishing second on tiebreak. Hovhannisyan won this tournament three years later.

In 2026, Hovhannisyan won the Dole Open, defeating Haik Martirosyan in the rapid tiebreaks after both players finished on 7.5/9.
