= Ashot Anastasian =

Armenian chess grandmaster (1964–2016)

Personal information
- Born: 16 July 1964 Yerevan, Armenian SSR, Soviet Union
- Died: 25 December 2016 (aged 52)

Chess career
- Country: Armenia
- Title: Grandmaster (1993)
- Peak rating: 2606 (January 2000)
- Peak ranking: No. 77 (January 2000)

Ashot Anastasian (Armenian: Աշոտ Անաստասյան; 10 July 1964 – 26 December 2016) was an Armenian chess Grandmaster. He won two team bronze medals and one individual gold medal at Chess Olympiads. On the March 2011 FIDE list, he had an Elo rating of 2556, making him ranked number 14 in Armenia.

Anastasian won the Armenian Chess Championship in 1983, 1985, 1986, 1987, 1988, 1992, 1994, and 2005. He received his International Master title in 1988 and Grandmaster title in 1993. In 1993 he placed first in Katowice. In 2007, he tied for first with Bassem Amin in the Abu Dhabi Chess Festival.

In September 2009 FIDE rating list he was ranked 325th in the world among active players.

In 2010, he was appointed coach of the Armenian national women's team.

On 26 December 2016, Armenpress reported that Anastasian had died.

== Notable games ==
- Ashot Anastasian vs. Sergei Tiviakov (1999) at the European Team Championship Games, 1-0
Anastasian vs. Tiviakov, Batumi 1999

Position: d8 black rook, e8 black rook, e7 white knight, h7 black king, f6 black queen, g6 black pawn, b5 black pawn, f5 white knight, a4 black pawn, g4 white pawn, h3 white rook, a2 white pawn, f2 white pawn, h2 white king

Final position
