= Elina Danielian =

Armenian chess grandmaster (born 1978)

Elina Danielian Էլինա Դանիելյան
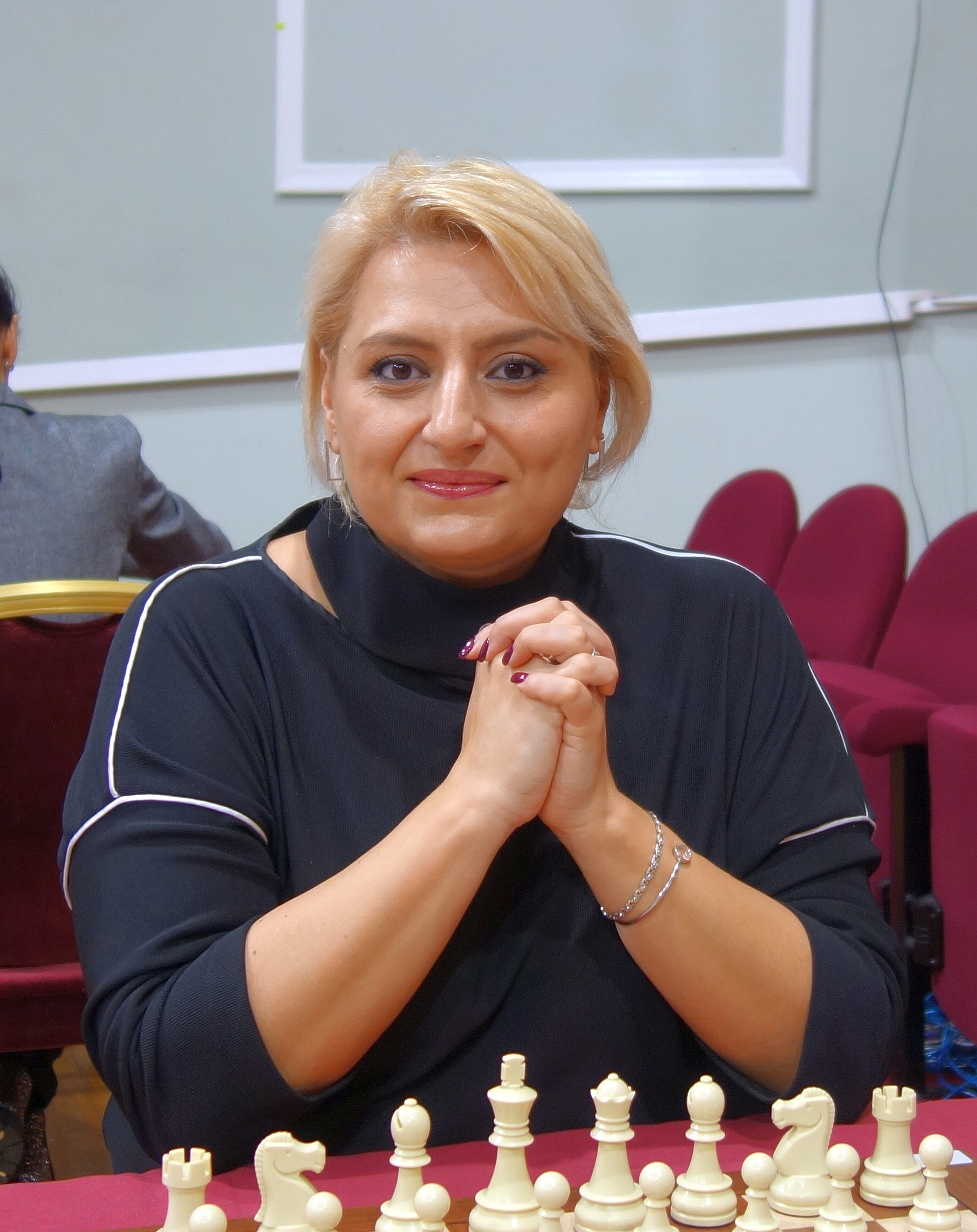
- Danielian in 2023

Personal information
- Born: 16 August 1978 (age 47) Baku, Azerbaijan SSR, Soviet Union

Chess career
- Country: Armenia
- Title: Grandmaster (2010)
- Peak rating: 2521 (July 2011)

Elina Danielian (Armenian: Էլինա Դանիելյան; born 16 August 1978) is an Armenian chess grandmaster and six-time Armenian women's champion (1993, 1994. 1999, 2002, 2003, 2004). She has represented Armenia twelve times during the Women's Chess Olympiads (1992–2014). She played in the gold medal-winning Armenian team at the 5th Women's European Team Chess Championship in Plovdiv 2003. In 2021 she won the European Individual Chess Championship.

Danielian won the World Under-14 Girls Championship in Duisburg 1992 and the World Under-16 Girls Championship in Bratislava 1993. In 2001, she won the European Women's Rapid Chess Championship in Minsk.

In October 2010, she was in the top 10 women chess players in the world. In March 2011, she was tied for first place in the Doha stage of the FIDE Women's Grand Prix 2009–2011. Danielian won the bronze medal in the 2011 European Women's Championship in Tbilisi, scoring 8/11 points.

In May 2019, Elina narrowly defeated grandmaster Kateryna Lagno (the reigning women's world blitz champion) in round 1 of the Women's Speed Chess Championship hosted by Chess.com. The match was a combination blitz & bullet format with the first set being 5 minutes with a 1-second increment (5+1), the second set being 3+1, and the final set being 1+1. The match was decided by the final bullet game, as the score was tied leading up to the finale.
