= Levon Babujian =

Armenian chess Grandmaster (born 1986)

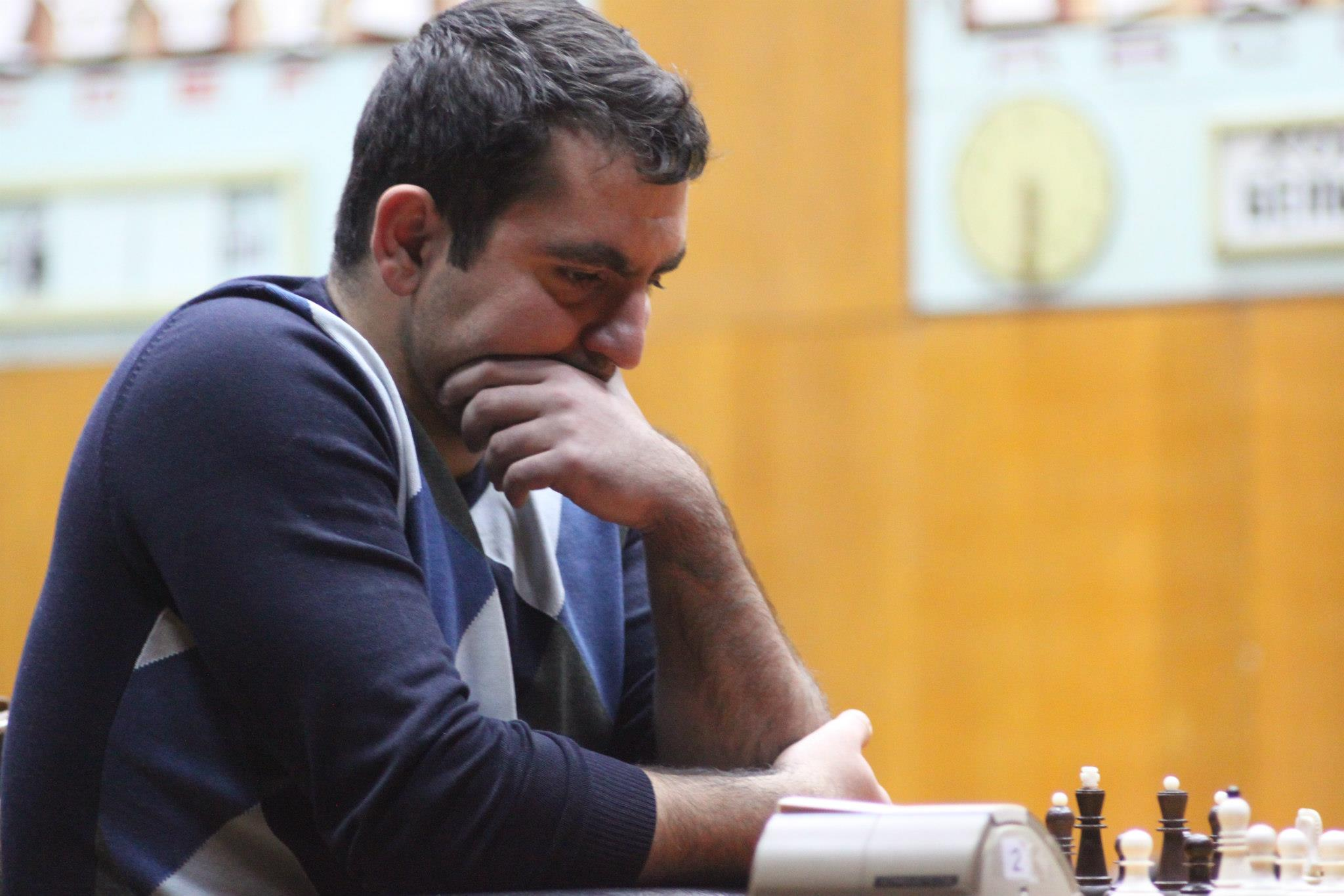
- Levon Babujian, 2013

Personal information
- Born: Լեւոն Բաբուջյան; May 8, 1986 (age 40) Yerevan, Armenia

Chess career
- Country: Armenia
- Title: Grandmaster (2010)
- Peak rating: 2518 (January 2009)

Levon Babujian (Armenian: Լեւոն Բաբուջյան; born May 8, 1986) is an Armenian chess Grandmaster.

Babujian was born in Yerevan. He attended the Armenian State Institute of Physical Culture and Sport and is the director of a chess school in the Malatia-Sebastia District of Yerevan.

In April 2006, Levon Babujian achieved the title of International Master (IM). He is a Grandmaster (GM) since January 2010.

== Tournaments ==
- 2008 Shared second-third at Vasylyshyn Memorial
- 2009 First at Istanbul
- 2011 Won the 81st Yerevan City Chess Championship
- 2011 Shared second-sixth in the 4th Karen Asrian Memorial in Jermuk
- 2012 Third in the Armenian Chess960 Championship.
- 2019 First at the Kazakhstan Cup Final.
