= Tigran Kotanjian =

Armenian chess grandmaster (born 1981)

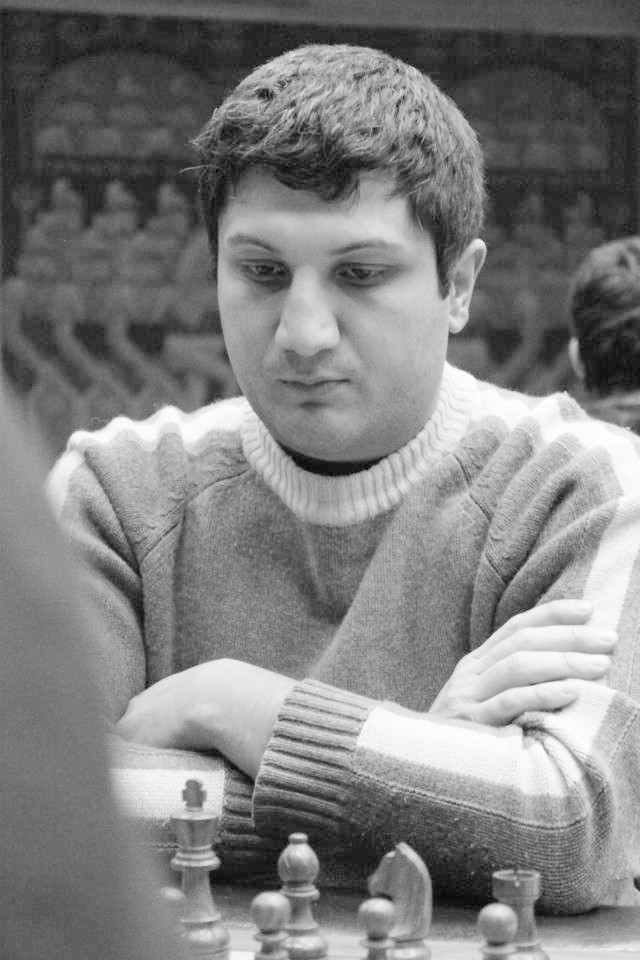
- Tigran Kotanjian, 2013

Personal information
- Born: September 1, 1981 (age 44)

Chess career
- Country: Armenia
- Title: Grandmaster (2006)
- FIDE rating: 2453 (July 2026)
- Peak rating: 2580 (July 2009)

Tigran Kotanjian (Armenian: Տիգրան Քոթանջյան; born September 1, 1981) is an Armenian chess grandmaster. He was Armenian Chess Champion in 2014.

== Career ==
Kotanjian won the Dubai Chess Open in 2009 and Karen Asrian Memorial in 2010. In 2011, he tied for 2nd–3rd with Kirill Stupak in the 4th Beirut Open tournament. In the same year he won the 4th Karen Asrian Memorial in Jermuk. He won the 74th Armenian Chess Championship in 2014.

He received his International Master title in 2003 and Grandmaster title in 2006. As of June 2018, he is the No. 22 ranked Armenian player.
