= Armenian Chess Championship =

Annual chess tournament in Armenia

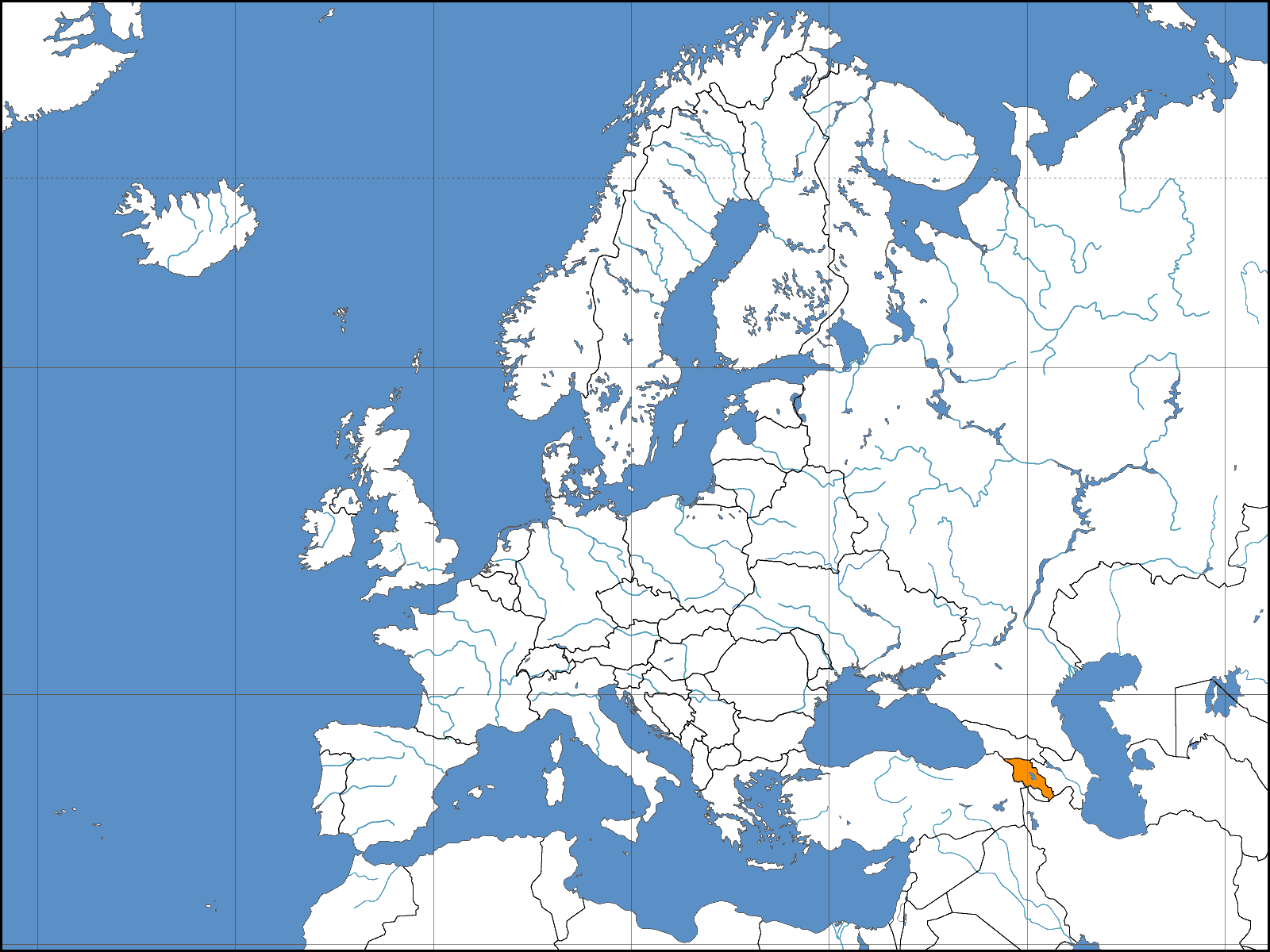
Armenia in Europe

This is a list of all the winners of the Armenian Chess Championship. The first championship was played in 1934, when Armenia was a part of the Transcaucasian SFSR. Championships were held sporadically in the Armenian SSR until 1945, when they became contested every year; this has continued today in independent Armenia. The tournament has usually been held as a round robin of the country's top players.

== Open Division Winners ==
#	Year	Winner
1	1934	Genrikh Kasparian (1)
2	1938	Genrikh Kasparian (2); Alexander Dolukhanian (1)
3	1939	Alexander Dolukhanian (2)
4	1941	Loris Kalashian; Vazgen Karapetian
5	1945	Alexander Kalantar
6	1946	Tigran Petrosian (1)
7	1947	Tigran Petrosian (2); Genrikh Kasparian (3)
8	1948	Tigran Petrosian (3); Genrikh Kasparian (4)
9	1949	Genrikh Kasparian (5)
10	1950	Genrikh Kasparian (6)
11	1951	Genrikh Kasparian (7)
12	1952	Vladimir Goldin
13	1953	Artsrun Sargsian (1)
14	1954	Genrikh Kasparian (8)
15	1955	Genrikh Kasparian (9)
16	1956	Genrikh Kasparian (10)
17	1957	Nikolay Miasnikov
18	1958	Eduard Mnatsakanian (1)
19	1959	Eduard Mnatsakanian (2)
20	1960	Eduard Mnatsakanian (3)
21	1961	Vanik Zakarian (1); Artsrun Sargsian (2)
22	1962	Eduard Mnatsakanian (4)
23	1963	Adolph Demirkhanian (1)
24	1964	Levon Grigorian (1)
25	1965	Adolph Demirkhanian (2)
26	1966	Levon Grigorian (2)
27	1967	Eduard Mnatsakanian (5)
28	1968	Levon Grigorian (3)
29	1969	Levon Grigorian (4); Karen Grigorian (1)
30	1970	Karen Grigorian (2)
31	1971	Levon Grigorian (5)
32	1972	Levon Grigorian (6); Karen Grigorian (3)
33	1973	Albert Arutiunov (1)
34	1974	Arshak Petrosian (1)
35	1975	Vahagn Voskanian
36	1976	Arshak Petrosian (2); Vanik Zakarian (2); Gagik Akopian
37	1977	Albert Arutiunov (2)
38	1978	Smbat Lputian (1)
39	1979	Slavik Movsisian
40	1980	Smbat Lputian (2)
41	1981	Vladimir Shaboian (1); Karen Movsisian
42	1982	Hrachik Tavadian
43	1983	Ashot Anastasian (1)
44	1984	Vladimir Shaboian (2)
45	1985	Ashot Anastasian (2)
46	1986	Ashot Anastasian (3)
47	1987	Ashot Anastasian (4)
48	1988	Ashot Anastasian (5)
49	1989	Armen Ambartsoumian
50	1990	Artashes Minasian (1)
51	1991	Sergey Galdunts
52	1992	Ashot Anastasian (6); Artashes Minasian (2)
53	1993	Artashes Minasian (3)
54	1994	Ashot Anastasian (7)
55	1995	Artashes Minasian (4)
56	1996	Vladimir Akopian (1)
57	1997	Vladimir Akopian (2)
58	1998	Smbat Lputian (3)
59	1999	Karen Asrian (1)
60	2000	Gabriel Sargissian (1)
61	2001	Smbat Lputian (4)
62	2002	Levon Aronian
63	2003	Gabriel Sargissian (2)
64	2004	Artashes Minasian (5)
65	2005	Ashot Anastasian (8)
66	2006	Artashes Minasian (6)
67	2007	Karen Asrian (2)
68	2008	Karen Asrian (3)
69	2009	Arman Pashikian (1)
70	2010	Avetik Grigoryan
71	2011	Robert Hovhannisyan
72	2012	Tigran L. Petrosian (1)
73	2013	Tigran L. Petrosian (2)
74	2014	Tigran Kotanjian
75	2015	Karen H. Grigoryan
76	2016	Zaven Andriasian
77	2017	Hovhannes Gabuzyan
78	2018	Haik M. Martirosyan
79	2019	Arman Pashikian (2)
80	2020	Samvel Ter-Sahakyan
81	2021	Hovhannes Gabuzyan
82	2022	Manuel Petrosyan
83	2023	Samvel Ter-Sahakyan (2)
84	2024	Robert Hovhannisyan (2)
85	2025	Robert Hovhannisyan (3)
86	2026	Manuel Petrosyan (2)

== Women's winners ==
#	Year	Winner
1	1934	Sirush Makints; Margarita Mirza-Avagian
2	1939	Lusik Kalashian
3	1941	Silva Karapetian
4	1949	Alis Aslanyan
5	1950	Rima Manukian (1)
6	1951	Marieta Melik-Pashaian (1)
7	1952	Marieta Melik-Pashaian (2)
8	1953	Nefelina Marjanian (1)
9	1954	Nefelina Marjanian (2)
10	1955	Rima Manukian (2)
11	1956	Marlena Vardanian (1)
12	1957	Galina Lyapunova (1)
13	1958	Galina Lyapunova (2)
14	1959	Galina Lyapunova (3)
15	1960	Galina Lyapunova (4)
16	1961	Galina Lyapunova (5)
17	1962	Marlena Vardanian (2)
18	1963	Venera Boiakhchian (1)
19	1964	Marlena Vardanian (3); Tamara Boiakhchian (1)
20	1965	Tamara Boiakhchian (2); Venera Boiakhchian (2)
21	1966	Tamara Boiakhchian (3)
22	1967	Armenuhi Mehrabian
23	1968	Tamara Boiakhchian (4); Venera Boiakhchian (3)
24	1969	Tamara Boiakhchian (5)
25	1970	Naira Agababean
26	1971	Tamara Boiakhchian (6)
27	1972	Tamara Boiakhchian (7); Anna Hakobian (1)
28	1973	Vera Ghazarian (1)
29	1974	Vera Ghazarian (2)
30	1975	Erna Khalafian (1)
31	1976	Anna Hakobian (2)
32	1977	Hasmik Babaian
33	1978	Anna Hakobian (3)
34	1979	Erna Khalafian (2)
35	1980	Meri Mangrian (1)
36	1981	Erna Khalafian (3)
37	1982	Meri Mangrian (2)
38	1983	Erna Khalafian (4)
39	1984	Ludmila Aslanian (1)
40	1985	Nune Abrahamian
41	1986	Ludmila Aslanian (2)
42	1987	Ludmila Aslanian (3)
43	1988	Erna Khalafian (5)
44	1989	Erna Khalafian (6)
45	1990	Erna Khalafian (7)
46	1991	Ludmila Aslanian (4)
47	1992	Ludmila Aslanian (5)
48	1993	Elina Danielian (1)
49	1994	Elina Danielian (2)
50	1995	Lilit Mkrtchian (1)
51	1996	Gohar Hlghatian (1)
52	1997	Gohar Hlghatian (2)
53	1998	Lilit Mkrtchian (2)
54	1999	Elina Danielian (3)
55	2000	Lilit Mkrtchian (3)
56	2001	Gohar Hlghatian (3)
57	2002	Elina Danielian (4)
58	2003	Elina Danielian (5)
59	2004	Elina Danielian (6)
60	2005	Lilit Mkrtchian (4)
61	2006	Siranush Andriasian (1)
62	2007	Siranush Andriasian (2)
63	2008	Lilit Galojan (1)
64	2009	Lilit Galojan (2)
65	2010	Anahit Kharatyan
66	2011	Siranush Andriasian (3)
67	2012	Maria Kursova (1)
68	2013	Anna Hairapetian
69	2014	Shushanna Sargsyan
70	2015	Susanna Gaboyan (1)
71	2016	Maria Gevorgyan (1)
72	2017	Maria Gevorgyan (2)
73	2018	Maria Kursova (2)
74	2019	Maria Gevorgyan (3)
75	2020	Maria Gevorgyan (4)
76	2021	Susanna Gaboyan (2)
77	2022	Mariam Mkrtchyan
78	2023	Maria Gevorgyan (5)
79	2024	Susanna Gaboyan (3)
80	2025	Susanna Gaboyan (4)
81	2026	Anahit Mkrtchyan
