= Istanbul Commerce University Faculty of Law =

Coordinates: 41.060214°N 28.950214°E

- İstanbul Ticaret Üniversitesi Hukuk Fakültesi
- Motto: Usus est magister optimus (Latin)
- Type: Private
- Established: 2001; 25 years ago
- Dean: Prof. Dr. Mustafa Erdoğan
- Location: Istanbul, Turkey
- Campus: Urban
- Website: hukuk.ticaret.edu.tr (in Turkish)
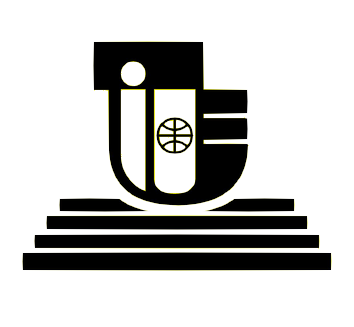

The Istanbul Commerce University Faculty of Law or ICU Law (Turkish: İstanbul Ticaret Üniversitesi Hukuk Fakültesi or İTİCÜ Hukuk) is the law school of Istanbul Commerce University offering undergraduate and graduate programs, located in Istanbul, Turkey.

The faculty was established in 2001 as one of the first private law schools in Turkey. Growing since, it is the third highest scores demanding private law school nationwide after Bilkent University Faculty of Law and TOBB University Faculty of Law as of 2011.

== Campus ==
Offering education in Eminönü Campus for eleven years from 2001 to 2012, the faculty moved to Sütlüce Campus in 2012. Law faculty in Sütlüce Campus was built specifically for law education as having moot courts, large amphitheaters, a library contains 124.000 publishing, electronic and paper, in total.

== Profile ==
Pursuing the globalization and Turkey's accession to EU processes, faculty offers comprehensive International Law, International Commerce Law and European Union Law lectures, apart from the courses needed for internal law of Turkey.

Language of lectures in ICU Law is Turkish, while English is a compulsory lesson and Legal English is an elective course.

Faculty attaches great importance to moot court competition experiences. Hence, it encourages and funds its senior students to join moot court competitions such as Willem C. Vis and Philip C. Jessup in international level and Velidedeoğlu Kurgusal Duruşma Yarışması in national level.

== Teaching staff ==
ICU Law's teaching staff is composed of eminent law scholars in Turkey. Here's the current list of full-time staff:^{[A]}

- Prof. Dr. Mustafa Erdoğan
- Prof. Dr. Şükrü Yıldız
- Prof. Dr. Emin Zeytinoğlu
- Prof. Dr. Algun Çifter
- Prof. Dr. Hüseyin Hatemi
- Prof. Dr. Didem Algantürk Light
- Prof. Dr. Yücel Oğurlu
- Prof. Dr. Kayıhan İçel
- Prof. Dr. Zafer Gören
- Assoc. Prof. Ayhan Ceylan
- Assoc. Prof. Muzaffer Şeker
- Assoc. Prof. Ömer Özkan
- Asst. Prof. Arif Barış Özbilen
- Asst. Prof. Ebru Şensöz Malkoç
- Asst. Prof. Abdulkadir Akıl
- Asst. Prof. Asuman Yılmaz
- Asst. Prof. Nagehan Kırkbeşoğlu
- A. R. Zehra Badak
- A. R. Hasret Ak
- A. R. Ahmet Kalafat
- A. R. M. Buket Soygüt Arslan
- A. R. Uğur Dinç
- A. R. Muhammet Celal Kul
- A. R. İdris Kaydul
- A. R. Hüseyin Erkoç

== See also ==
- Istanbul Commerce University
- Turkish universities

== Notes ==
- A Please see full list of teaching staff here: ICU Law teaching staff (in Turkish)
