= List of law schools in Turkey =

This is a list of law schools in Turkey.

- Akdeniz University, Faculty of Law
- Anadolu University, Faculty of Law
- Ankara University, Law School
- Ankara Yıldırım Beyazıt University, Faculty of Law
- Atatürk University, Faculty of Law
- Bahçeşehir University, Faculty of Law
- Baskent University, Faculty of Law
- Beykent University, Faculty of Law
- Bilkent University, Faculty of Law
- Çukurova University, Faculty of Law
- Dicle University, Faculty of Law
- Erzincan Binali Yıldırım University, Faculty of Law
- Galatasaray University, Faculty of Law
- Gazi University, Faculty of Law
- Hacettepe University, Faculty of Law
- Istanbul Aydin University, Faculty of Law
- Istanbul Commerce University Faculty of Law
- Istanbul Medipol University, Faculty of Law
- Istanbul University, Faculty of Law, founded in 1874 and operating since 1880 consistently, currently the oldest and most prestigious law school in Turkey.
- Kadir Has University, Faculty of Law
- Kırıkkale University, Faculty of Law
- Kocaeli University, Faculty of Law
- Koç University, Faculty of Law
- Marmara University, Faculty of Law
- MEF University, Faculty of Law
- Selçuk University, Faculty of Law
- TOBB University of Economics and Technology, Faculty of Law
- Yeditepe University, Faculty of Law

== See also ==
- Education in Turkey
- Constitution of Turkey
