= World Trade Center Istanbul =

Turkish service company

Coordinates: 40.986353°N 28.83188°E

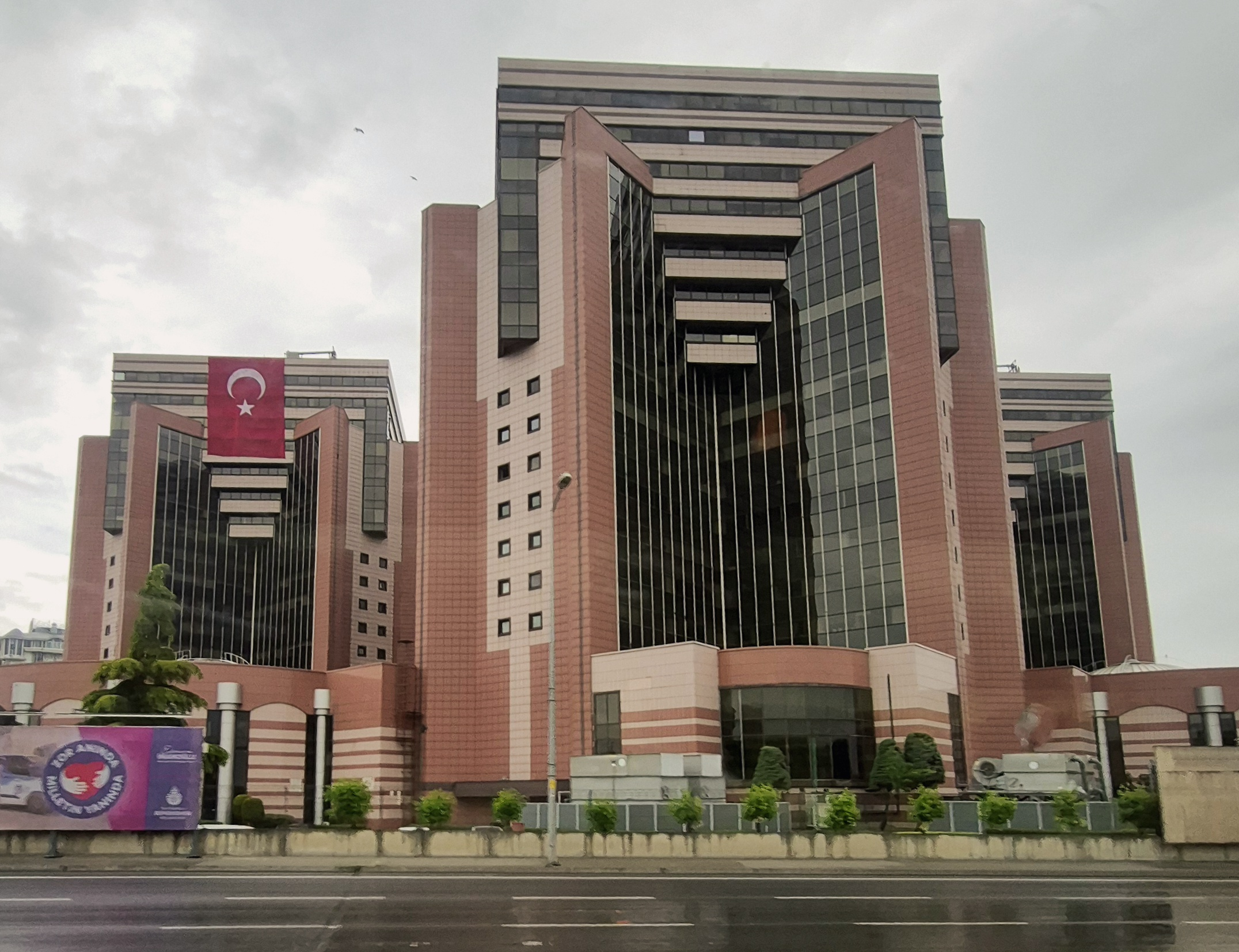
World Trade Center Istanbul.

World Trade Center Istanbul (WTCI) (Turkish: İstanbul Dünya Ticaret Merkezi, İDTM) is a service company established in 1982 and based in Yeşilköy, Istanbul, Turkey, which, to promote international commerce and world trade, provides commercial information and market research services, organizes trade delegation programs, operates fair areas and offers office, convention and meeting halls, runs hotels within its organization. It is owned by Istanbul Chamber of Commerce, Union of Chambers and Commodity Exchanges of Turkey, Istanbul Metropolitan Municipality, Bakırköy Municipality, Istanbul Chamber of Industry, Istanbul Commodity Exchange as well as Economic Development Foundation of Turkey.

The complex of World Trade Center Istanbul covers an area of 500,000 m^{2} (120 acres) situated next to the Atatürk International Airport. It has a subway station and a vast parking lot for 6,000 cars in total.

== Services and facilities ==
Istanbul Expo Center (Istanbul Fuar Merkezi) IFM

Organizes about 100 national and international trade fairs each year. There are eleven exhibition halls covering an area of 98,000 m^{2} (1,050,000 sq ft). The parking lot of the fair ground can hold 4,300 cars.

WTC Istanbul Business Center

Offers office space in three separate plazas built on an area of 180,000 m^{2} (1,900,000 sq ft), each having 17 office floors. In addition, there are three shopping floors. Its parking lot is capable of 1,700 cars.

Convention Center

The complex also houses the biggest convention center in Istanbul with a seating capacity for 4,000 visitors.

Hotels

There are two hotels, a four-star airport hotel with 1,250-bed capacity and another five-star hotel.

=== Fair Halls ===
Istanbul Expo Center consists of 11 halls. It has 249,000 square meters of fair and living space. It has an open parking lot for approximately 10 thousand vehicles. There are restaurants and kiosks in the Fairground.

== Notable events hosted ==
- Futurallia Istanbul 2013 - International Business Meetings Forum, June 5-7, 2013
- 10th Turkish Language Olympiads, June 1-3, 2012
- 40th Chess Olympiad, August 27-September 10, 2012
