= Kübra Güran Yiğitbaşı =

Turkish politician and academic

Kübra Güran Yiğitbaşı (born 1979 in Ankara, Turkey) is a Turkish bureaucrat, academic, and writer. She is the first Governor wearing a headscarf in Turkish history.

== Biography ==
Kübra was born in 1979 in Ankara and studied at Department of Communication, Department of Radio, Television and Film, at Ankara University.

She completed her master's degree at Istanbul Commerce University, Department of Psychology, with her book on "The Impact of Father's Deprivation on Children".

Since August 5, 2021, she has held the position of Deputy Minister of Family and Social Services of the Republic of Turkey. On May 12, 2022, she was appointed governor of Afyonkarahisar by decree published in the Official Gazette.
