= Davut Kavranoğlu =

- Born: 1 June 1962 (age 64); Gündoğdu, Rize, Turkey
- Education: California Institute of Technology; Istanbul Technical University

Davut Kavranoğlu (born 1 June 1962) is a Turkish scientific adviser to the President of Turkey, academic, scientist, politician, and the first deputy minister of Turkey. Kavranoğlu served as the Deputy Minister of Industry, Science and Technology of Turkey from 2011 to 2015.

== Education and career ==
Kavranoğlu has a Bachelor of Science degree in Electrical and Electronics Engineering from Istanbul Technical University (1984). He has completed his master's in 1986 and PhD in 1989 at California Institute of Technology (Caltech, Pasadena, CA).

In 1989, he started at King Fahd University of Petroleum and Minerals as an assistant professor and in 1993 became an associate professor. Between 1993 and 2007 he taught as an associate professor at King Fahd University of Petroleum and Minerals, at Beykent University and at Istanbul Commerce University. In 2009, he joined Yalova University as a professor in Computer Engineering. To date, Kavranoğlu has published many papers and articles.

In August 2011, Kavranoğlu was appointed as the first deputy minister of Turkey.

In July 2015, Kavranoğlu was appointed Chief Scientific Adviser to the President of Turkey. He is responsible for Science, Technology, Higher Education and Industry policies. He left his Chief Adviser position in February 2019.

After leaving the public Chief Advisor position, he is leading Knowledge Economy Association Turkey (Bilgi Ekonomisi Derneği). He is also managing director of consulting company based in Istanbul-Turkey (STIC Partners). He is also leading a new technology startup company Geoxon Inc.

Kavranoğlu is married and has seven children.
