= Adèle Aybike Avinal =

Turkish-French architect and former Turkish national chess team player

- Born: 1977 (age 48–49)
- Citizenship: Turkey, France
- Occupations: Architect, construction economist, BIM specialist
- Known for: Turkish national chess team player, architecture, Building information modeling

Adèle Aybike Avinal (born 1977) is a Turkish-French architect, BIM specialist and construction economist based in France. Before her career in architecture, she played chess for the Turkish national team and represented Turkey in international youth and Balkan chess competitions. Her later work has mainly focused on construction economics, digital construction methods, building information modeling (BIM) and project information management.

== Chess career ==
Avinal appeared in the Turkish press as a young chess player. In 1987, the daily newspaper Cumhuriyet published an article titled “Satranççı kız kardeşler” (“The chess-playing sisters”), about Aybike Avinal and her sister Aytuna Avinal.

In 1991, Cumhuriyet reported that Aybike Avinal drew against the Hungarian grandmaster András Adorján during a simultaneous exhibition organized by the Turkish Chess Federation.

Avinal later played for Turkey in girls' Balkan chess competitions. According to OlimpBase, she played on board one for Turkey at the 24th Girls' Chess Balkaniad, held in Ankara in 1993, and finished the tournament with a 1933 Elo performance rating.

== Architecture career ==
Avinal pursued her architectural work in both Turkey and France. In 2007, she was part of the team awarded second prize in the competition for the Konyaaltı Nature and Culture Park architectural and landscape project in Antalya, Turkey. The results published by Mimarlık magazine list Savaş Ekinci, Arbil Ötkünç and Aybike Avinal among the members of the awarded team.

In France, Avinal’s work gradually moved toward construction economics and digital project management. During the 2010s, she took part in professional events and publications on BIM, PIM and project information management. In an article published by Batirama, she was described as an economist and BIM manager, with comments on how information is managed in construction projects.

== BIM and digital construction ==
Avinal has worked on BIM, openBIM, construction economics and digital tender documents. In France, she has also contributed to professional BIM events as a speaker and working group leader.

In 2017, at BIM's Day, organized by Mediaconstruct, the “DCE numérique” working group was presented as being led by Adèle-Aybike Avinal and Thibault Bourdel. The group worked on digital tender documents and openBIM methods.

In 2019, Avinal led a technical workshop titled “BIM et nuage de points” during meetings organized by UNGE Nouvelle-Aquitaine. The workshop dealt with BIM and the use of laser scanning in BIM workflows. She was presented at the event as a CINOV representative and BIM Manager.

Avinal also prepared a BIM presentation for the Institut pour la Conception Éco-responsable du Bâti (ICEB), covering environmental performance and digital modeling.

== See also ==
- Chess
- Building information modeling
- Architecture
