= Union of Chambers and Commodity Exchanges of Turkey =

Trade association

Union of Chambers and Commodity Exchanges of Turkey Türkiye Odalar ve Borsalar Birliği
- Abbreviation: TOBB
- Formation: March 8, 1950; 76 years ago
- Type: NGO
- Purpose: Commerce, industry and maritime commerce
- Headquarters: Ankara, Turkey
- Location: Dumlupınar Bulvarı 252 (Eskişehir Yolu 9. km)
- Coordinates: 39.90900°N 32.76097°E
- Members: Chambers and commodity exchanges
- President: M. Rifat Hisarcıklıoğlu
- Website: www.tobb.org.tr

The Union of Chambers and Commodity Exchanges of Turkey (Turkish: Türkiye Odalar ve Borsalar Birliği, TOBB for short) is a confederation of all local chambers of commerce, industry and maritime as well as commodity exchanges in Turkey.

== Overview ==
The union was founded on March 8, 1950, as an umbrella organization in Ankara as the country's highest legal entity representing the private sector. Its president is M. Rifat Hisarcıklıoğlu since 2001.

The TOBB has 365 chambers and commodity exchanges, such as:

- 178 chambers of commerce and industry,
- 60 chambers of commerce,
- 12 chambers of industry,
- 2 chamber of maritime commerce and
- 113 commodity of exchanges

with a membership of totalling to 1.4 million companies.

== Affiliations ==
The TOBB is affiliated with Association of European Chambers of Commerce and Industry (Eurochambres), Islamic Chamber of Commerce and Industry (ICCI), Association of the Mediterranean Chambers of Commerce and Industry (ASCAME), Association of Balkan Chambers (ABC), and Association of the Black Sea Zone Chambers of Commerce and Industry (BCCI).

== See also ==
- TOBB University of Economics and Technology
- World Trade Center Istanbul
- List of company registers
