= Ali Nihat Yazıcı =

Turkish chess official

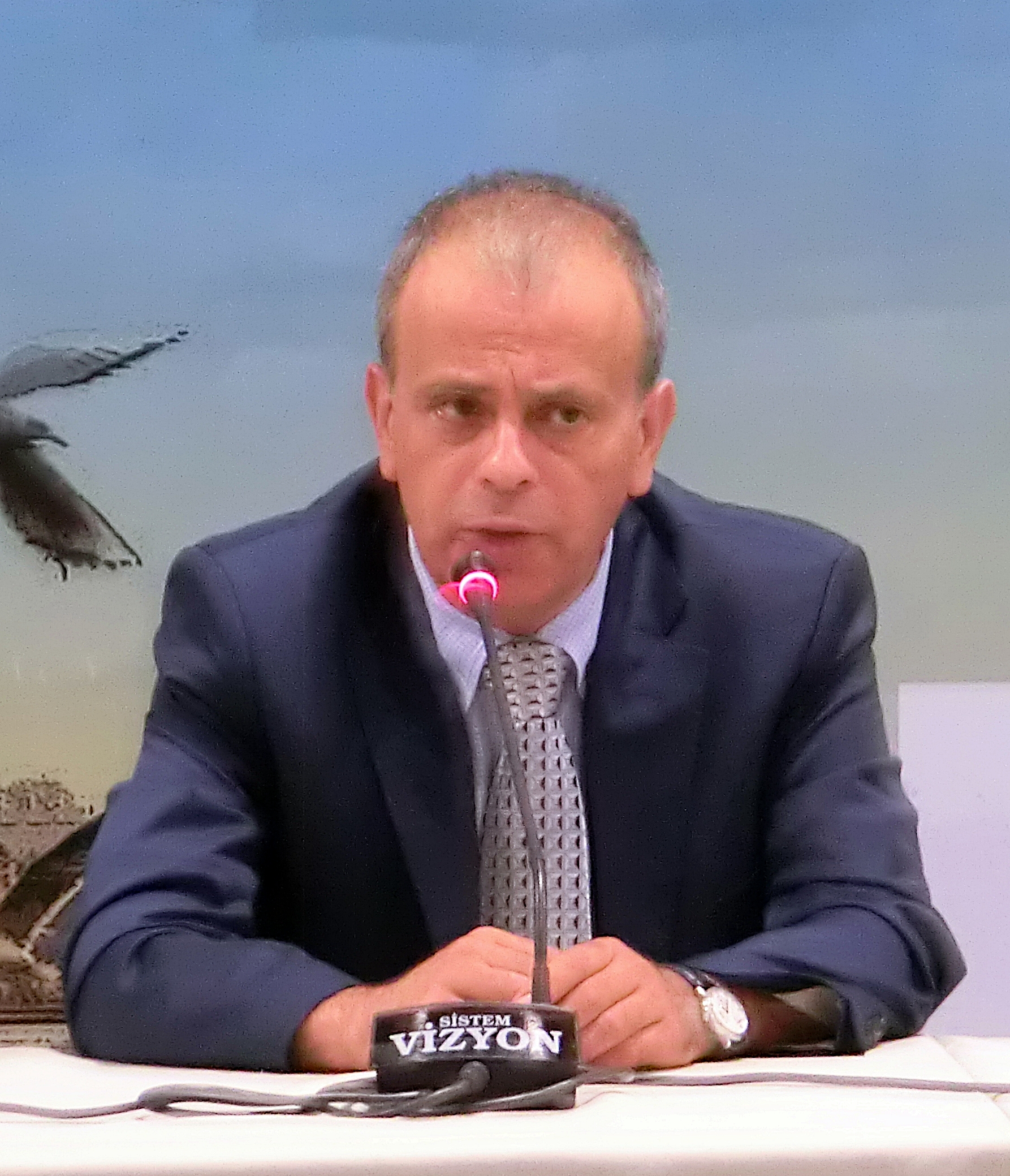
Ali Nihat Yazıcı at the Chess Olympiad 2012 in Istanbul

Ali Nihat Yazıcı (born 1964) is the head of Turkish Chess Federation.

After graduating from Istanbul Technical University as an electronics and communication engineer in 1987, Yazıcı worked for the Turkish Radio and Television Corporation (TRT) as an engineer. He got an MBA from Middle East Technical University. He graduated from Swiss International Business Academy first with a higher education degree on Radio and Television. He left Ankara University at a thesis level on Radio and Television. He was appointed to TRT Television vice presidency between 1991 and 2001.

Yazıcı is a FIDE International Arbiter and was elected as president to the Turkish Chess Federation as of 18 November 2000.
