= Istanbul Fair Center Yeşilköy =

Coordinates: 40°59′19″N 28°49′23″E

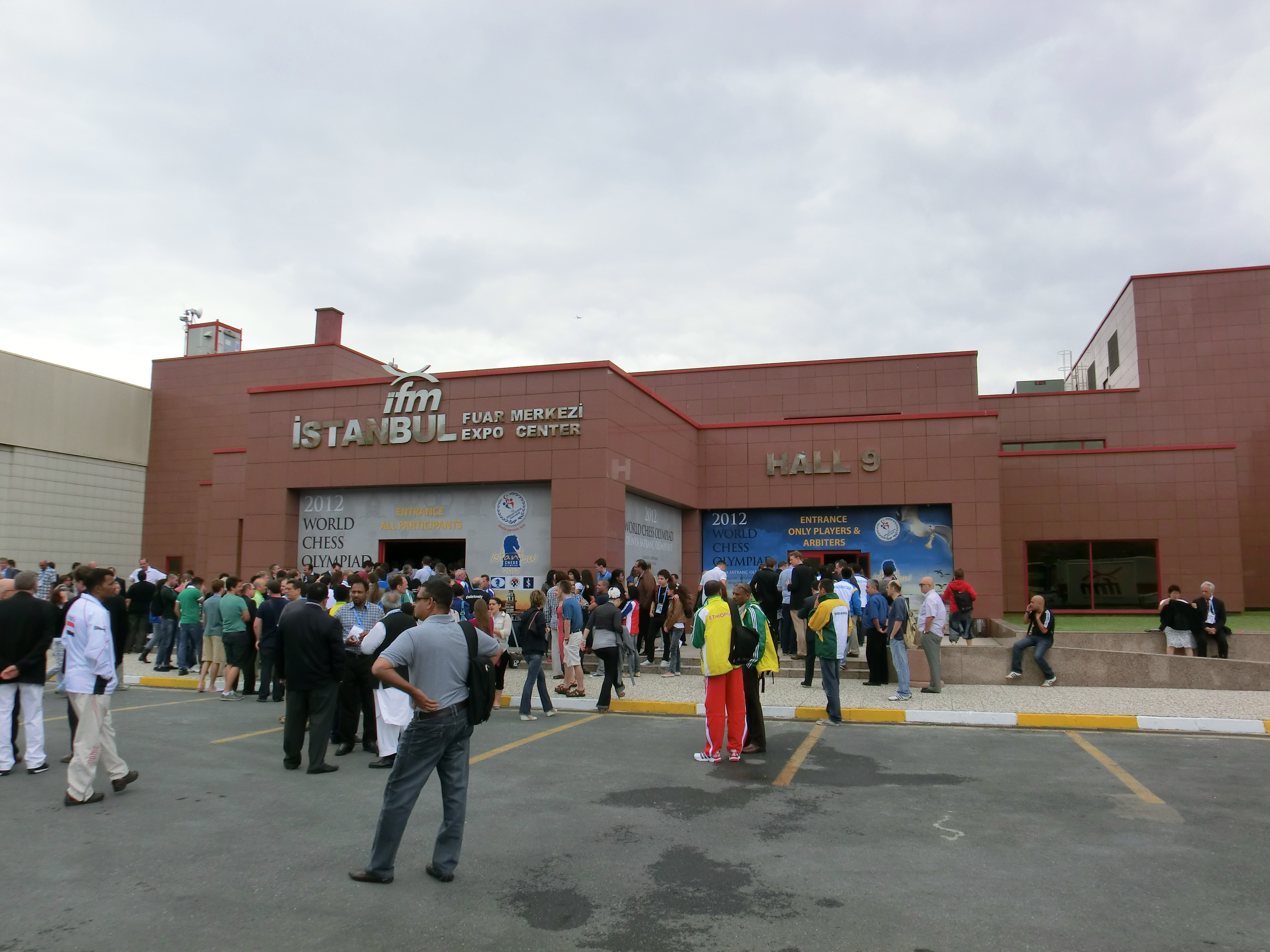
Hall 9 of Istanbul Expo Center during the 2012 Chess Olympiad.

Istanbul Fair Center (Turkish: İstanbul Fuar Merkezi Yeşilköy), also known as Istanbul Expo Center, is a fairground close to the Istanbul Atatürk Airport at Yeşilköy neighborhood of Bakırköy district in Istanbul, Turkey. It is owned by World Trade Center Istanbul, which is part of the global network of World Centers Association with over 300 licenses in about 100 countries.

The fairground covers an area of 249,000 m^{2} (2,680,000 sq ft) in total consisting of eleven halls with a leasable area of 98,000 m^{2} (1,050,000 sq ft). Eight of the halls are operated by CNR Expo while the remaining three halls are run by WTC Istanbul. Around 100 national and international trade fairs are hosted by the fair center each year.

The fair center has a television channel IFM TV as an online service, which broadcasts the events during the exhibitions. Neighboring facilities are WTC Istanbul Business Towers, WOW Hotels and WOW Convention Center.

The fairground is served by the Istanbul Metro line M1A at the station DTM—İstanbul Fuar Merkezi.
