= 40th Chess Olympiad =

2012 chess tournament in Istanbul, Turkey

- Logo of the 40th Chess Olympiad
- Host city: Yeşilköy, Istanbul
- Country: Turkey
- Nations: 152 (Open); 122 (Women)
- Teams: 157 (Open); 127 (Women)
- Athletes: 1,407
- Dates: 27 August – 10 September 2012
- Main venue: Istanbul Expo Center

Medalists

Team (Open)
- 1st place, gold medalist(s): Armenia
- 2nd place, silver medalist(s): Russia
- 3rd place, bronze medalist(s): Ukraine

Team (Women)
- 1st place, gold medalist(s): Russia
- 2nd place, silver medalist(s): China
- 3rd place, bronze medalist(s): Ukraine

Individual (Open)
- (Azerbaijan) Shakhriyar Mamedyarov

Individual (Women)
- (Russia) Nadezhda Kosintseva

The 40th Chess Olympiad (Turkish: 40. Satranç Olimpiyatı), organised by the Fédération Internationale des Échecs and comprising an open and women's tournament, as well as several events designed to promote the game of chess, was an international team chess event that took place in Istanbul, Turkey, from 27 August to 10 September 2012. The city also hosted the event in 2000.

More than 1,700 players and team captains participated, including 157 teams in the open and 127 teams in the women's section. The main competitive events were held at the Istanbul Expo Center. The Chief Arbiter of the event was Greece's International Arbiter Panagiotis Nikolopoulos.

== Background ==
Istanbul's hosting the 34th Chess Olympiad in 2000 sparked a "Chess boom" in the country. Turkey has since hosted more than 100 international chess tournaments, including European Championships, World Youth Championships, and Youth Chess Olympiads. Membership in the Turkish Chess Federation has risen from 3,000 to about 250,000 in only eight years. Ali Nihat Yazıcı, President of the Turkish Chess Federation, is credited with triggering most of the activities towards this intensive chess development in the country. He was later elected a vice-president of FIDE.

Istanbul won the right to host the 40th Chess Olympiad in November 2008, during the 78th Congress of FIDE at the 38th Chess Olympiad in Dresden. Istanbul's bid was approved by a vote of 95–40 over Budva.

== The event ==
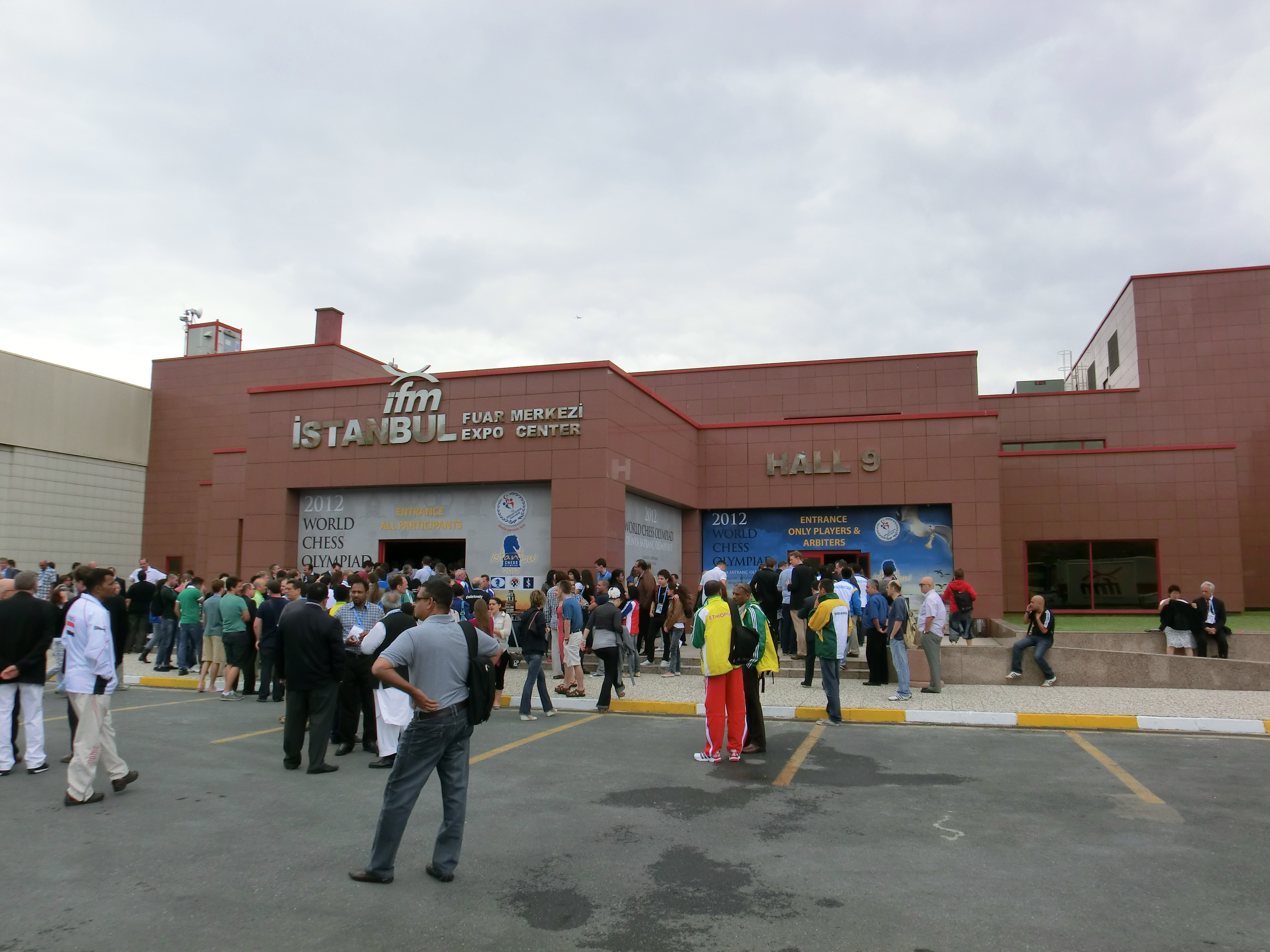
The Istanbul Expo Center, the location of the tournament

=== Competition format ===
The tournament was played in a Swiss system format. The time control for all games was 90 minutes for the first 40 moves, after which an additional 30 minutes were granted and increment of 30 seconds per move was applied. Players were permitted to offer a draw at any time. A total of 11 rounds were played, with all teams playing in every round.

In each round, four players from each team faced four players from another team; teams were permitted one reserve player who could be substituted between rounds. The four games were played simultaneously on four boards, scoring 1 game point for a win and ½ game point for a draw. The scores from each game were summed together to determine which team won the round. Winning a round was worth 2 match points, regardless of the game point margin, while drawing a round was worth 1 match point. Teams were ranked in a table based on match points. Tie-breakers for the table were i) the Sonneborn–Berger system; ii) total game points scored; iii) the sum of the match points of the opponents, excluding the lowest one.

=== Open event ===
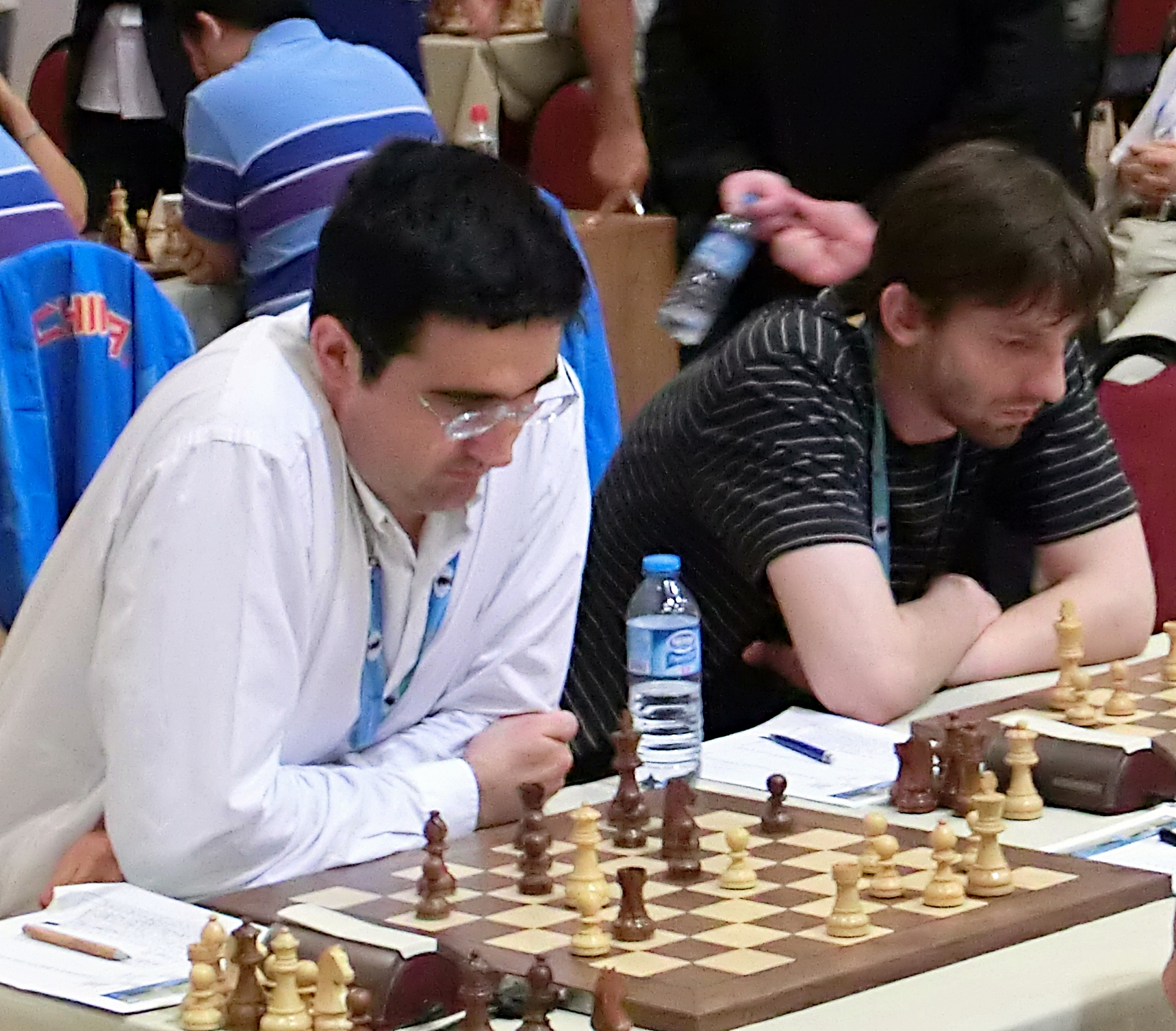
Vladimir Kramnik and Alexander Grischuk playing for Russia

The open section of the tournament was contested by 157 teams representing 152 nations. Turkey, as host nation, had three teams, whilst the International Braille Chess Association (IBCA), the International Physically Disabled Chess Association (IPCA), and the International Committee of Silent Chess (ICSC) each provided one team.

Armenia, led by world number 2 Levon Aronian, won their third title after previously winning the event in 2006 and 2008. The Russian team were once again the clear favourites before the Olympiad but failed to win the gold for the fifth consecutive time and occupied the second place, while the Ukrainian team as a titleholder finished in the third place. Three teams, China, Armenia and Russia, were tied on the top of the standings before the last round of the event with China winning the tie-breaker. But in that final round the Chinese players had to play against Ukraine, led by Vassily Ivanchuk, while Armenians played against Hungary and Russia played against Germany. The Armenians and Russians won their final matches but Ukraine edged the leading Chinese team 3–1 preventing them from winning a medal. The Armenian and Russian teams had the same match points in the final standings but the Armenians won the tie-breaker taking their third title. Ukraine, thanks to the win in the final round against China, took the bronze medal.

Open event
#	Country	Players	Average rating	MP	dSB
1	Armenia	Aronian, Movsesian, Akopian, Sargissian, Petrosian	2724	19	397.0
2	Russia	Kramnik, Grischuk, Karjakin, Tomashevsky, Jakovenko	2769	19	388.5
3	Ukraine	Ivanchuk, Ponomariov, Volokitin, Eljanov, Moiseenko	2730	18	
4	China	Wang Hao, Wang Yue, Ding Liren, Bu Xiangzhi, Li Chao	2694	17	390.5
5	United States	Nakamura, Kamsky, Onischuk, Akobian, Robson	2702	17	361.0
6	Netherlands	Giri, van Wely, Sokolov, Smeets, Stellwagen	2682	16	329.0
7	Vietnam	Lê Quang Liêm, Nguyễn Ngọc Trường Sơn, Nguyễn Văn Huy, Nguyễn Đức Hòa, Đào Thiên Hải	2589	16	313.5
8	Romania	Lupulescu, Pârligras, Marin, Vajda, Nevednichy	2600	16	310.0
9	Hungary	Leko, Almási, Polgar, Berkes, Balogh	2708	15	368.0
10	Azerbaijan	Radjabov, Safarli, Mamedyarov, Mamedov, Guseinov	2693	15	344.0

All board prizes were given out according to performance ratings. Shakhriyar Mamedyarov on the third board had the best performance of all players in the tournament:

- Board 1: (Armenia) Levon Aronian 2849
- Board 2: (Czech Republic) David Navara 2869
- Board 3: (Azerbaijan) Shakhriyar Mamedyarov 2880
- Board 4: (France) Vladislav Tkachiev 2750
- Reserve: (Russia) Dmitry Jakovenko 2783

=== Women's event ===
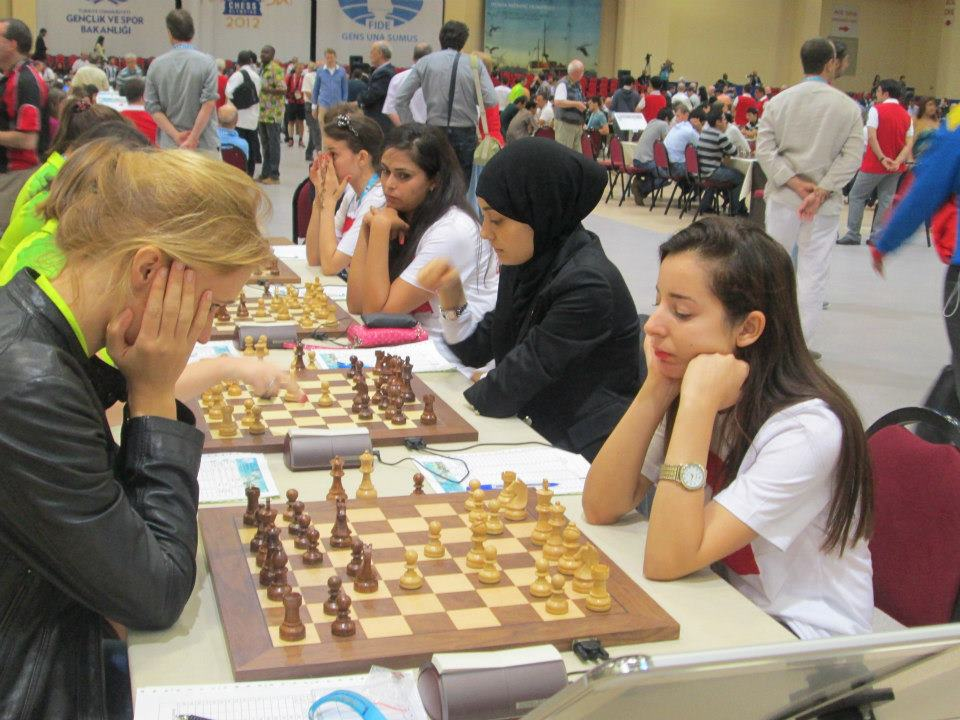
Chess match in the women's event

The women's event was contested by 127 teams representing 122 nations. Same as the open event, Turkey had three teams, whilst the International Braille Chess Association (IBCA), the International Physically Disabled Chess Association (IPCA), and the International Committee of Silent Chess (ICSC) each provided one team.

Russia took the gold medal in the women's section to win their second consecutive title. China, led by the current World Chess Champion Hou Yifan took the second place, while Ukraine finished in third place overall. The medal-winning teams were also the only undefeated teams on the tournament. China and Russia entered the final round against Bulgaria and Kazakhstan respectively tied on the first place with China winning the tie-breaker. The Russian team scored an easy win 4–0 against the Kazakh team, while China faced some problems and edged Bulgaria by a minimum winning score of 2.5–1.5. Both teams were tied again in the final standings, but this time it was Russia winning the tie-breaker to secure their second consecutive title. Ukraine won their last match against Germany 3.5–0.5 and thus won the bronze medal.

Women's event
#	Country	Players	Average rating	MP	dSB
1	Russia	T. Kosintseva, Gunina, N. Kosintseva, Kosteniuk, Pogonina	2513	19	450.0
2	China	Hou Yifan, Zhao Xue, Ju Wenjun, Huang Qian, Ding Yixin	2531	19	416.0
3	Ukraine	Lahno, Muzychuk, Zhukova, Ushenina, Yanovska	2471	18	
4	India	Dronavalli, Karavade, Sachdev, Gomes, Soumya	2412	17	
5	Romania	Foisor, Bulmaga, Cosma, L'Ami, Sandu	2377	16	313.5
6	Armenia	Danielian, Mkrtchian, Galojan, Kursova, Hairapetian	2404	16	313.0
7	France	Skripchenko, Milliet, Maisuradze, Collas, Bollengier	2350	15	347.5
8	Georgia	Dzagnidze, Khotenashvili, Javakhishvili, Khurtsidze, Batsiashvili	2390	15	344.0
9	Iran	Pourkashiyan, Khademalsharieh, Hejazipour, Hakimifard, Ghaderpour	2267	15	339.0
10	United States	Zatonskih, Krush, Foisor, Goletiani, Abrahamyan	2419	15	326.0

All board prizes were given out according to performance ratings. Nadezhda Kosintseva on third board had the best performance of all players in the tournament:

- Board 1: (China) Hou Yifan 2645
- Board 2: (China) Zhao Xue 2574
- Board 3: (Russia) Nadezhda Kosintseva 2693
- Board 4: (China) Huang Qian 2547
- Reserve: (Russia) Natalia Pogonina 2487

=== Gaprindashvili Trophy ===
The Nona Gaprindashvili Trophy is awarded to the nation that has the highest total number of match points in the open and women's divisions combined. Where two or more teams are tied, they are ordered by the same tie breakers as in the two separate events.

The trophy, named after the former women's World Champion (1961–78), was created by FIDE in 1997.

#	Team	MP	dSB
1	Russia	38	
2	China	36	806.5
3	Ukraine	36	781.5

== Controversies ==
On 24 November 2010, The New York Times published an article concerning the possibilities that the Turkish Chess Federation has paid the voters amount of $120,000 in order to win the bids to organize the Olympiad. In the financial report published on the official website of the Turkish Chess Federation there was a footnote, which translated into English points on the allocation of these costs for stand, souvenirs, lobbying activities, as well as accommodation, transportation and food for some of the FIDE delegates to vote for the city. The official answer of the Turkish Chess Federation denied the claim and mentioned that the sum spent is not very big when bidding to host an Olympiad. It was also clarified in the response that the costs were allocated to pay for the Turkish delegates at the FIDE Congress in Dresden, and the expenses documented by invoices testify that no money was given to any of the FIDE delegates and none of the expenses were reimbursed.

In June 2012, Ali Nihat Yazıcı, President of the Turkish Chess Federation, announced that no arbiters from Germany, England, France, Georgia, Switzerland, Ukraine and the United States would be accepted for the event because of the involvement of those countries in launching or supporting court cases against FIDE, causing financial problems and a loss of distributable income for worldwide chess development. A few days later, the English Chess Federation sent a protest letter to FIDE, which was later co-signed by the other federations who announced their support.

Russian journalist Evgeny Surov was denied accreditation and was not even allowed to enter the venue as a spectator. This led to protests by the Russian Chess Federation and more than 40 top players.
