= Istanbul Chamber of Commerce =

Business chamber in Istanbul, Turkey

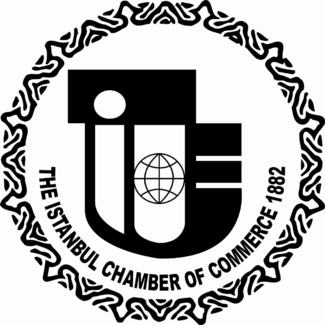
- Founded: 1882
- Location: Istanbul
- Members: 300.000
- Key people: Şekib Avgadiç, President
- Website: http://www.ito.org.tr

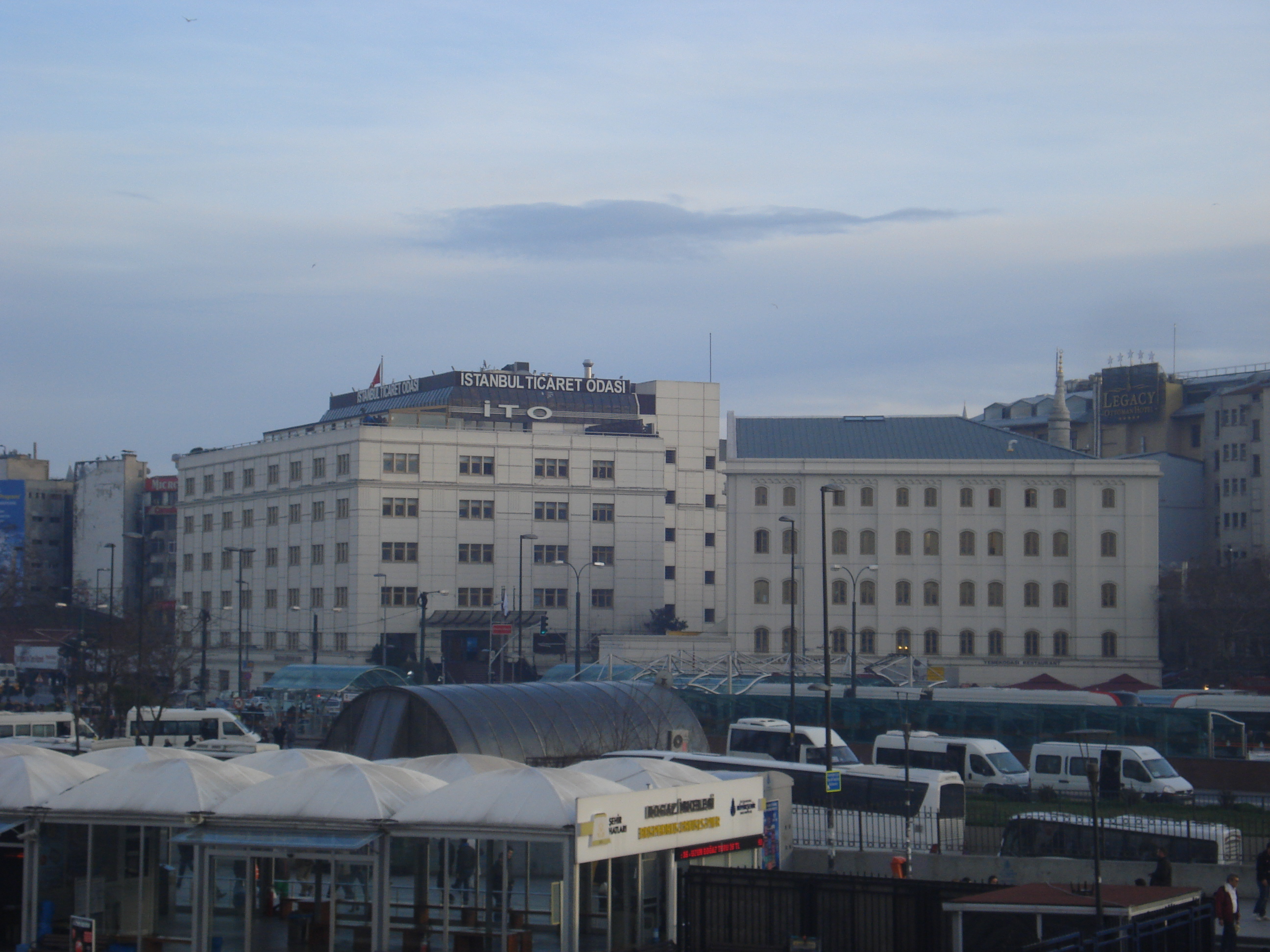
Istanbul Chamber of Commerce building in Eminönü.

The Istanbul Chamber of Commerce (ICOC; Turkish: İstanbul Ticaret Odası) is an institution that organizes and records the commercial transactions of individuals and commercial institutions located in Istanbul; in addition the ICOC also keeps records for these companies. The activities of the Istanbul Chamber of Commerce are for the most part carried out in the central building, located in Eminönü.

Chairman of the Istanbul Chamber of Commerce, Şekib Avdagic.

== History ==
=== Establishment ===
As part of their concern for the commercial and industrial problems of the 19th century, the Ottoman State desired to bring together the representatives of the industrial sector into one institution. To this end, the Trade and Agricultural Council, which had been established in 1876, was very productive. Subsequently, Mehmed Said Pasha (1838–1914), who had been appointed as grand vizier (prime minister) in 1879, put a start to the processes that were necessary for the establishment of trade, industry and agricultural guilds. Acting upon Said Pasha’s directive, a draft charter consisting of 11 articles was prepared for the establishment of a chamber of commerce that would be similar to those in Europe, particularly the French examples. This draft was accepted by the Council of Ministers (Meclis-i Mahsus) on 18 January 1880. The Council of Ministers ruled that the chamber was to be referred to as the Ticaret Odası and quoted the decision in the text of the charter as follows: “The establishment of a Ticaret Odası in Istanbul by the Meclis-i Mahsus has been ratified by Abdul Hamid II II on 19 January 1880. Thus, for the first time in the Ottoman territory the process concerned with the establishment of a local chamber of commerce has been completed. The stage to proceed to next will be the completion of the organizational processes and the start of the activities of the Dersaadet (Istanbul) Ticaret Odası.”

=== The Establishment Charter of the Istanbul Chamber of Commerce ===
The administrative structure of the Dersaadet Ticaret Odası was very different from that of a modern chamber of commerce. While modern chambers have separate committees to carry out executive and supervisory functions, all the functions of the Dersaadet Ticaret Odası were carried out by one institution. According to the first regulations of the Dersaadet Ticaret Odası, 24 members formed the chamber council. In order to be a member of the council, one had to be at least 30 years of age, have dealt with trade for at least 5 years, not have been implicated in any felony or murder, nor have committed any shameful crime that damaged one’s reputation or honor or to have been bankrupted; if the candidate had gone bankrupt, then they should have been able to regain their honor and name before becoming a member. The members of the council were selected by a majority secret ballot; if the votes were tied, the elder candidate would be selected. It was forbidden for two members to be selected from the same company. The members were selected by a twenty-person election committee, headed up by the minister of trade and agriculture; half of the commission was appointed by the minister, the other half by merchants. A majority vote among the members of the chamber would select a president and a vice-president, who would be ratified by the Ministry of Trade. The members of the Dersaadet Ticaret Odası were elected for three years; that is, every year one-third of the members were newly appointed. If a member did not participate in the meetings for a period of six months without stating a good reason, they were considered to have resigned. The Dersaadet Ticaret Odası would act on its own initiative or would be instructed in how to act by the Ministry of Trade when applied to, thus providing opportunities for the advancement of trade; this included functions like taking the necessary measures to develop trade and industry, carrying out changes required in trade functions, customs duties, the construction of ports, the functioning of steam boats in the rivers, post offices and telegraphs, railway construction, repairs of roads and bridges, the establishment of stock markets, and the publication of trade newspapers.

The internal regulations were prepared immediately after the establishment of the Dersaadet Ticaret Odası and were presented to the Ministry of Trade for its approval. In this charter, the status of the Ticaret Odası was organized according to the total sovereignty of the state; this remained the status, without any serious change, until 1950.

=== The First Internal Charter of the Dersaadet Ticaret Odası ===
A “preparatory committee” headed up by Azaryan Efendi, which was known as the Cemıyet-i Ticariye (Trade Council), was established to prepare internal regulations. An “interim-institute” started to function with an official ceremony in April 1880; this body continued to operate until 14 January 1882. The organization of the Dersaadet Ticaret Odası had been prepared by this same date. At the moment that the Dersaadet Ticaret Odası started to operate officially the Cemiyet-i Ticariye ceased to function; that is, the Cemiyet became the Dersaadet Ticaret Odası on 14 January 1882. The Cemiyet-i Ticaret met ten times until it was transformed into the Ticaret Odası, meeting to discuss the regulations of the Dersaadet Ticaret Odası, which had been prepared by the commission. The members were informed that the charter of the Dersaadet Ticaret Odası had been approved by the ministry and the charter went into execution on 27 December 1881.

The internal charter of the Dersaadet Ticaret Odası, dated 16 August 1881 was organized in a detailed way, setting out the function of the duties and authorities of the Dersaadet Ticaret Odası. The internal charter, which consisted of six main sections, included many articles concerned with the aim and duties of the Dersaadet Ticaret Odası, the method of convening, the duties of the president, the functioning of the Ticaret Odası and its procedures, the duties of the merchants, the position of the head secretary and officials, as well as with the income of the Dersaadet Ticaret Odası.

=== The Seal of the Chamber ===
According to the internal charter of the Dersaadet Ticaret Odası, the Ticaret Odası had its own seal. On the top part of this seal was a “Crescent Moon and Star” symbol, while in the middle was inscribed: Dersaadet Ticaret Odası, surrounded by the French phrase Chambre de Commerce de Constantinople. All the documents that were dealt with in the Chamber of Commerce were to be stamped with this seal.

=== Opening Ceremony of the Dersaadet Ticaret Odası ===
The members of the Dersaadet Ticaret Odası, who were summoned after the ratification of the internal charter, took the decision to carry out an official opening of the Dersaadet Ticaret Odası; it was decided that the first meeting was to be held on 14 January 1882. Before the opening of the Chambers of the Commerce, 200 lira was loaned to the Cemiyet’s accountant Benzona Efendi by Azaryan Efendi, who was the chief of the Cemiyet at that date, to spend on fittings and office supplies. Some time later the members of the Ticaret Odası were convened again and it was decided that the opening ceremony of the Dersaadet Ticaret Odası, which was to go into operation on 14 January 1882, would be held in its own building and that this should be in a neighborhood that would be easy for tradesmen to reach. Upon this, the Dersaadet Ticaret Odası went into operation in flat No. 12, a property belonging to Mehmed Ali Pasha which was located on the shores of the Golden Horn. It was seen to be suitable that the opening ceremony be held in the same location. The Dersaadet Ticaret Odası was opened with a simple ceremony in the Mehmed Ali Pasha Han (Business Quarters). At the opening, the minister of trade and agriculture, Raif Efendi, was present and made a speech.

== Structure ==
The Istanbul Chamber of Commerce consists of two main structures, one established by election and one by appointment. The organs that are formed by election are the Meslek Komiteler (Professional Committees), Oda Meclisi (Chamber Assembly), Yönetim Kurulu (Board of Directors) and the Disiplin Kurulu (Disciplinary Board). The organs that are established by appointment are the Genel Sekreterlik (General Secretarat) and the Şube Müdürlük (Branch Directorate). There are 257 council members and 347 committee members who are appointed as results of elections held every four years; this makes up the structure of the Istanbul Chamber of Commerce.

== Professional Committees ==
The Istanbul Chamber of Commerce is one of the largest chambers of commerce in the world, with a registered membership of 350,000. The Professional Committees of the Istanbul Chamber of Commerce consists of approximately 90 elected Professional Committees. These committees are categorized according to NACE codes and are determined by the number of companies active in the related sector.

== Projects ==
=== Istanbul Commerce University ===
The Istanbul Commerce University was established by the ICOC Waqf and started to offer education in the 2001-2002 academic year; the president of the university is Dr. Sabri Orman, while the head of the board of trustees is Erhan Erken, a member of the ICOC Council. The university has started to provide education in its own buildings in Küçükyalı, which were purchased in 2007, in addition to its quarters in Üsküdar.

3,860 students are pursuing undergraduate degrees while 412 students are completing post graduate courses. The Istanbul Commerce University consists of 5 faculties, an English preparatory department, and one vocational high school, 3 institutes (social sciences – science and engineering – foreign trade), 2 centers (the EU application and research center and the continuous training center) and 1 unit (the IT security application and research unit).

=== Primary and Secondary Education Projects ===
The Istanbul Chamber of Commerce has introduced 14 schools to the Turkish educational world; from the beginning of 2010 there are 4 vocational schools, an autistic children’s educational center, 8 primary schools - one in Lice, Diyarbakır and the others in Istanbul - and one multi-program high school.

- 1968 – İTO Primary School (Karamandere Village, Şile)
- 1971 - İTO Kadınlarçeşmesi Primary School
- 1973 - İTO 50.Yıl Primary School (4.Levent, Kağıthane)
- Diyarbakır, Lice Primary School
- 1977 - İTO Kanarya Primary School
- 1986 - İTO Bağcılar Primary School
- 1987 - İTO Anatolian Vocational High School (Okmeydanı)
- 1990 - İTO Anatolian Technical High School (Bayrampaşa)
- 1998 - İTO Ümraniye Primary School
- 1999 - İTO Vocational Training School (Beyoğlu)
- 2000 - İTO Çatalca Multi-Program High School
- 2008 - İTO Anatolian Vocational Career High School (Pendik)
- 2008 - İTO Autistic Children’s Education Center (Bağcılar)
- 2008 - İTO Kadınlarçeşmesi Primary School (the old school was torn down and the school was rebuilt)

The Istanbul Chamber of Commerce has also built 13 schools, one in Istanbul and 12 in different regions of Anatolia, in commemoration of Turkish martyrs. These schools are listed below:

- In memory of Martyr Private Erkan Aslan;

An 8-classroom primary school in the Balaban Village of the Eğil Province of Diyarbakır, with 10 residential quarters for employees

- In memory of Martyr Gendarme Private Süleyman Turan:

A 12-classroom primary school in the Altıntaş Province of Kütahya.

- In memory of Martyr Private Burhan Yalçın;

An 8-classroom primary school in the Kumçatı Village in the central province of Şırnak with 10 residential quarters for employees.

- In memory of Martyr Private Zeki Avenli:

A 16-classroom primary school in the Araklı province of Trabzon

- In memory of Martyr Gendarme Corporal Mustafa Gözütok;

A 24-classroom primary school in the Davraz region of the central province of Isparta

- In memory of Martyr Gendarme Specialist Sergeant Tahsin Onuk:

An 8-classroom primary school and 6 residential quarters for employees in the Söğütlü township of Kelkit province in Gümüşhane

- In memory of Martyr Private Servet Aktaş:

An 8-classroom primary school in the Alişar village in the Battalgazi province of Malatya

- In memory of Martyr Private Dursun Sıvaz:

A 40-classroom primary school in the Sultanbeyli district of Istanbul.

- In memory of Martyr Yusuf Kolay:

An 8-classroom primary school and 10 residential quarters for employees in the Şeyh Halil township of the Yıldızeli region of Sivas

- In memory of Martyr Major Kibar Korhan Koç:

A 12-classroom primary school and 6 residential quarters for employees in the Terme Region of Samsun

- In memory of Uzman Sergeant Mehmet Güçlü:

A 10-classroom primary school in the Bozon village of the Mezitli region of Mersin.

- In memory of Martyr Major Ömer Aktuğ:

An 8-classroom primary school and residential quarters for employees in the Topluca village in the Çamlıhemşin region of Rize.

- In memory of Martyr Private Muhterem Ak:

A 10-classroom primary school and 6 residential quarters for employees in the Sızma township of the Selçuklu province of Konya

== The Teknopark Istanbul Project ==
The Teknopark Istanbul Project has been led by the Permanent Undersecretariat of the Defense Industry, the Istanbul Chamber of Commerce, Airport Management and Aeronautical Industries A.Ş., Istanbul Commerce University, and Defense Technology Engineering and Commercial AŞ; as part of the scope of the project these institutions have provided direct support for the establishment of Teknopark Istanbul A.Ş. With the contract signed by the partners on March 12, 2010, the Istanbul Chamber of Commerce has become one of the founding partners of the project.

ITO-SSM Teknopark will be established on land that is part of the Advanced Technology Industry Park (İTEP), which is the property of the National Defense Ministry; this land makes up part of Sabiha Gökçen Airport. The most important characteristic of the Teknopark Istanbul Complex is that it will be established upon a structure that is formed from the public and private sectors and a university. The Istanbul Chamber of Commerce will set aside a budget of 50 million TL, and the park will be brought to life in an area measuring 5,000 square meters. In addition, a research center will be constructed. Teknopark Istanbul will, as part of its mission, work on advanced technology, including defense, space and aeronautics, biotechnology, nanotechnology and naval technologies.

== The ÖZİMEK Project ==
In 2007 the Mesleki ve Teknik Eğitim Kursları (Vocational and Technical Training Courses) Project, ÖZİMEK, which has been brought into life as a joint venture by the Istanbul Chamber of Commerce (ICOC), the Istanbul Special Provincial Administration and the Istanbul Regional Board of Education, is seen as being the largest career-training program in the Turkish Republic. The aim of the project is to protect, increase and develop employment, to help reduce unemployment by benefiting from trade and vocational training schools and institutions, and to provide vocational development, change and training to prepare officials or those still working in the sector so that they will be able to be employed in keeping with new technology and developments.

The İş-Kur project was included in later stages of the project. The first aim was to develop a project that would provide 500 students with certificates at 15 trade high schools, in 44 different branches; at the present time, three large institutions in Istanbul, which has a great need in this area, have provided 10,000 courses in 70 vocational schools, in 82 separate branches, producing 6,500 graduates. By 2011 the project will have trained 30,000 people.

As part of the Istanbul Chamber of Commerce, the website: “Human Resources Market” has been established for the graduates of these courses. Those who have graduated can register their resumes on this site and thus when seeking employees, employers will be able to give priority to those who have graduated from certified courses.

== e-ICOC ==
In 2006, the Istanbul Chamber of Commerce began an e-ICOC project which enabled members to complete ICOC procedures online, including patents, archiving, documents and forms. The system has been integrated with the systems of other institutions with whom the Chamber of Commerce works, including notaries, the Ministry of Trade and Industry, the Ministry of Finance, the Turkish Statistical Institute (TÜİK), the Union of Chambers and Commodity Exchanges of Turkey (TOBB), Bağ-Kur, the governor's office and the city councils. With the implementation of this project, the Istanbul Chamber of Commerce has aimed to minimize internal bureaucracy and make tracking documents easier, thus creating an efficient and paperless office.

== Formula One (Istanbul Park) ==
The expansion of the Formula 1 Grand Prix into Turkey was initiated by the Istanbul Chamber of Commerce. The Formula 1 facilities in Istanbul were successfully completed in 2005 when the first races were held. ICOC's partner TOBB, as well as the Istanbul Metropolitan Municipality and the Special Provincial Administration aided in the completion of the facilities. After the first two races, the operation of the Istanbul Formula 1 Grand Prix was privatized and transferred to a third party.

== Persian Gulf Development ==
The Istanbul Chamber of Commerce has paid visits to the Persian Gulf region in order to benefit from the capital accumulation resulting from the increase in oil output. A large delegation, including many representatives from the construction sector, participated in the visits which were organized to Qatar, Kuwait, Saudi Arabia and the United Arab Emirates. As a result of the meetings with both the private sector and government officials, Turkish contractors have undertaken many important construction projects in this region. Furthermore, these meetings have yielded an increase in Persian Gulf investments in Turkey. These visits and meetings have brought about extremely productive results both for Turkish investments in the Persian Gulf countries, as well as for the Gulf countries' investments in Turkey.

== The Start-Exporting Program ==
In 2010, 140 Istanbul Chamber of Commerce members benefited from the Start-Exporting program. This project, this first of its type in Turkey, is held throughout the country and has to date trained organizations in many provincial chambers of commerce. Between January 12 and May 12, 2010, the Start-Exporting program, which was developed in collaboration with the Madrid Chamber of Commerce and Industry, reached the sixth step.

== The First Step in the U.S. Market Project ==
In 2007, the Istanbul Chamber of Commerce, in partnership with the U.S. Chamber of Commerce (USCHAMBERS) launched the first step in the U.S. Market project. The project aims to improve trade relations between Turkey and the United States and to ensure the access of Turkish firms to the world's largest market. After Doing Business seminars were organized in Istanbul and the United States, a comprehensive educational website on the two markets went into operation.

The Istanbul Investment and Trade Office has been opened in New York City. The Istanbul office, one of the many offices that have been opened in various financial centers, was opened in the Istanbul World Trade Center, hosted by the Istanbul Chamber of Commerce on October 4, 2010.

== Chronology of the Istanbul Chamber of Commerce ==
A chronology of the history of the Istanbul Chamber of Commerce is given below:

1876	The Trade and Agriculture Council was established.
1880	The Dersaadet Ticaret Odası and the Chamber of Industry and Agriculture were established.
1882	With the first meeting held on January 14, 1882, at the Mehmet Ali Pasha Center in Galata, the Dersaadet Ticaret Odası began operating.
1884	The printing of the Dersaadet Ticaret Odası newspaper began.
1889	As of March 11, 1889, the Dersaadet Ticaret Odası was transformed into the Chamber of Commerce, Agriculture and Industry. Until 1910 the functions of the Chamber of Commerce, Agriculture and Industry continued under the Dersaadet Ticaret Odası, which was renamed the Dersaadet Chamber of Commerce, Agriculture and Industry.
1910	With the regulation of June 13, the Chamber of Trade and Industry and the Chamber of Agriculture were separated once again. The Istanbul Chamber of Commerce and Industry was founded.
1911	The Dersaadet Chamber of Commerce newspaper began to be published as the Dersaadet Commerce and Industry newspaper.
1922	The Turkish National Trade Union was founded.
1923	The ICOC participated in the Izmir Economic Congress. The Istanbul Chamber of Commerce and Industry was nationalized.
1924	The Istanbul Chamber of Commerce and Industry's journal began to be published in Ottoman Turkish and French.
1925	The regulations on the Chambers of Commerce and Industry came into force, making the chamber a legal entity and mandating membership. The Istanbul Chamber of Commerce and Industry moved to the Fourth Foundation Center. The Istanbul stock exchange was established and a bulletin started to be published.
1926	The Istanbul Chamber of Trade and Industry held its first elections for the Chamber's assembly.
1927	The Istanbul Chamber of Trade and Industry became a member of the International Chamber of Commerce. The Chamber's journal began printing in Turkish and French.
1928	The price indices started to be printed in the United Nations' publications.
1937	Clinics for tradesmen were established.
1943	The law related to the Chambers of Trade and Industry, Chambers of Small Business Owners and Commodity Exchanges came into execution.
1950	The law related to the Chambers of Trade and Industry, Chambers of Commerce, Chambers of Industry, and Commodity Exchanges came into execution.
1952	The Istanbul Chamber of Industry was established.
1958	The first edition of the Istanbul Chamber of Industry's newspaper was printed.
1963	The Economic Development Foundation was created in cooperation with the Istanbul Chamber of Industry.
1968	The “Rewarding the Successful Exporters” program was launched.
1970	The ICOC offices were moved to a building located along the shores of the Golden Horn in Eminönü.
1977	The ICOC introduced the “Tax Award” program.
1980	The ICOC became a member of the World Trade Centers Association. The Consumer Complaints Board was established as part of the ICOC.
1981	Law No. 5590 related to the Chambers of Trade and Industry; Chambers of Commerce; Chambers of Industry; Chambers of Shipping; Commodity Exchanges; Turkish Chambers of Trade, Industry and Shipping and Commodity Exchange Associated came into execution. The first issue of the Annual Economic Report was published.
1982	The ICOC began to print a magazine in English entitled Istanbul Chamber of Commerce – ICOC. The Istanbul World Trade Center Inc. was established and the Istanbul Chamber of Shipping was formed.
1990	The ICOC established the Turkish Subcontracting Exchange.
1993	The ICOC became a member of the Association of the Mediterranean Chambers of Commerce and Industry.
1994	The Istanbul Chamber of Commerce Foundation for Education and Social Services was established. The Kadıköy Regional Representative Office was opened. The voice-response system was put into service.
1996	The Istanbul Trade Registry Office was devolved to the ICOC.
1999	After receiving an ISO-9001 Quality Assurance Certificate, ICOC began to use the Total Quality Management program. The new service building in Eminönü began operations. The Yenibosna Regional Representative Office was opened.
2001	Istanbul Commerce University and the ICOC Art Gallery were opened.
2002	As part of the Accreditation Project led by EuroChambers (The Associate of European Chambers of Commerce and Industry), the ICOC was recognized as the Best Chamber in Europe.
2003	Formula 1 Istanbul Inc. was established. The ICOC Vision Journal (Vizyon Dergisi) was published for the first time. The Istanbul Chamber of Commerce Vocational Training Center (İTOMEM) commenced operations. The ICOC Turkish Subcontracting Exchange was given the Best Service Award for small enterprises by the World Federation of Chambers of Commerce.
2004	The Union of Chambers and Commodity Exchanges of Turkey Law No. 5590 was renewed with Law No. 5174. Later the ICOC Information Line was transformed into a call center (+90 212 444 0 486). The Information Collection Agency was established. The Outdoor Art Center was opened and the Istanbul Painting Exhibition and ICOC Rare Works Exhibition were held.
2005	The Formula 1 Turkey Grand Prix was held for the first time in Istanbul. The Start-Exporting Program was launched.
2006	The Most Successful Small Business Competition was held.
2007	Murat Yalçıntaş, Chairman of the ICOC Board of Directors, was elected president of the Association of the Mediterranean Chambers of Commerce and Industry (ASCAME). The Vocational and Technical Training Courses Project (ÖZIMEK) was launched.
2008	The European Capital of Culture Agency was established in 2010 with the ICOC as both a consultant as well as a permanent member of the board of directors. The ICOC Professional Committees were formed according to the General Industrial Classification of Economic Activities (NACE). Awards were given to businesses with more than 50 years of membership in the ICOC.
2009	The ICOC and the Undersecretariat for Defense Industries (SSM) signed a letter of intent for Teknopark. Murat Yalçıntaş, Chairman of the ICOC Board of Directors, was elected for the second time as the president of the Association of the Mediterranean Chambers of Commerce and Industry.
2010	The ICOC European Union Information Center was opened. The partnership agreement for Teknopark Istanbul was signed.

== See also ==
- List of company registers
