= Yücel Oğurlu =

Turkish professor of administrative law

Yücel Oğurlu (born 1970) is a Turkish legal scholar and professor of administrative law. He has served as rector of the International University of Sarajevo, Istanbul Commerce University and Balıkesir University.

== Early life and education ==
Oğurlu was born in Istanbul in 1970. He graduated from the Istanbul University Faculty of Law in 1992. He received a master's degree in fiscal law in 1995 and a doctorate in public law in 1999, both from Marmara University.

== Career ==
Oğurlu began his academic career at Atatürk University and joined Istanbul Commerce University in 2006.

He subsequently conducted research as a visiting scholar at Tilburg University in the Netherlands and Ahmed Yesevi University in Kazakhstan.

Oğurlu has participated in national and international projects relating to administrative law and has served as a referee and editorial board member for academic journals.

He served as rector of the International University of Sarajevo from 2013 to 2016.

In 2019, he was appointed rector of Istanbul Commerce University, serving in that position until 2023.

On 11 January 2023, Oğurlu was appointed rector of Balıkesir University by a presidential appointment decision.

== Scholarship ==
Oğurlu has published books, book chapters and articles in Turkish and English on administrative law and other fields of public law.

He has also written newspaper columns on law, international law and international relations.

== Selected works ==
Oğurlu, Yücel, and Bünyamin Gürpınar. Introduction to Turkish Law. Istanbul: On İki Levha Yayıncılık, 2010. Oğurlu, Yücel. İdare Hukukunda E-Devlet Dönüşümü ve Dijitalleşen Kamu Hizmeti. Istanbul: On İki Levha Yayıncılık, 2009. Oğurlu, Yücel. İdare Hukukunda Kazanılmış Haklara Saygı ve Haklı Beklentiler Sorunu. Ankara: Seçkin Yayıncılık, 2003. Oğurlu, Yücel. Karşılaştırmalı İdare Hukukunda Ölçülülük İlkesi. Ankara: Seçkin Yayıncılık, 2002. Oğurlu, Yücel. İdari Yaptırımlar Karşısında Yargısal Korunma. Enlarged and revised 2nd ed. Ankara: Seçkin Yayıncılık, 2001.

=== Selected chapters and reports ===
Oğurlu, Yücel, and Canan Küçükali. “ICT in the Turkish Judicial System (National Judiciary Network Project).” In Use of Information and Communication Technologies in European Judicial Systems. European Commission for the Efficiency of Justice, 2007. Oğurlu, Yücel, and Canan Küçükali. “Turkey.” In Information and Communication Technology for the Public Prosecutor's Office: Country Reports. Bologna: Bologna University, 2007.
