= Turkish Chess Federation =

Governing chess organisation within Türkiye

- Abbreviation: TSF
- Formation: 1991
- Headquarters: Ulus, Ankara
- Region served: Turkey
- President: Gülkız Tulay
- Affiliations: FIDE; European Chess Union; Mediterranean Chess Association
- Website: www.tsf.org.tr

The Turkish Chess Federation (Turkish: Türkiye Satranç Federasyonu, TSF) is the governing chess organization within Turkey. The TSF was founded in 1954, and became a member of the FIDE in 1962. The federation was integrated into the General Directorate of Youth and Sports in 1991, gaining its official nationwide recognition. As of 2012, the president of the federation is Gülkız Tulay. Having over 800,000 licensed players, TSF is the largest sports Federation in Turkey.

The TSF is also member of the European Chess Union and Mediterranean Chess Association.

== Competitions ==
The federation organizes the following chess competitions:

- Türkiye İş Bankası Chess League
- Turkish Chess Premier League
- Turkish Chess Championship
- Turkish Women's Chess Championship
- Turkish Cadets' Chess Championship
- Turkish Children's Chess Championship
- Turkish Chess Clubs Championship

== International events ==
- 34th Chess Olympiad (October 28-November 12, 2000) in Istanbul
- Women's World Chess Championship (December 2–25, 2010) in Hatay
- World Amateur Championship (October 1-11, 2011) in Antalya
- Women's World Team Championship (December 17-28, 2011) in Mardin
- 2011 European Schools Chess Championship (October 12-20, 2011) in Antalya
- 40th Chess Olympiad (August 27-September 10, 2012) in Istanbul
- 2012 European Individual Women's Chess Championship (March 1-14, 2012) in Gaziantep
- 2013 World Junior U20 Chess Championships (September 12-27, 2013) in Kocaeli
- 2013 World Team Chess Championships (November 24- December 4, 2013) in Antalya
- 2015 European Schools Chess Championship (June 24-July 3, 2015) in Konya

== Rating System ==
- Turkish Chess Federation uses Ukd system.

== See also ==
- Fédération Internationale des Échecs (FIDE)
