= TOBB University of Economics and Technology =

Foundation university in Ankara

Coordinates: 39.9219°N 32.7992°E

- TOBB Ekonomi ve Teknoloji Üniversitesi
- Type: Private (Non-profit)
- Established: July 1, 2003; 23 years ago
- Rector: Yusuf Sarınay
- Students: 6,052
- Doctoral students: 105
- Location: Ankara, Turkey
- Colors: Red, blue, and yellow
- Website: www.etu.edu.tr/tr

University rankings

Regional – Overall
- QS Emerging Europe and Central Asia: 221-230 (2022)

TOBB University of Economics and Technology is a private non-profit university in Ankara, Turkey.

== History ==
It was established in 2003 by the Turkish Chambers and Commodity Exchanges Education and Culture Foundation (TOBEV), a branch of the Union of Chambers and Commodity Exchanges of Turkey, the highest legal entity representing the private sector. Student admissions began in 2004 with three faculties and ten departments, and the Faculty of Fine Arts and Design was added in 2007, admitting its first students the same year.

The university emphasizes close collaboration between academia and industry, aiming to prepare students for careers in business and science. TOBB University places a strong focus on entrepreneurship, integrating cooperative education into its curriculum, where internships are part of the graduation requirements.

TOBB University held its first graduation ceremony in 2008 and subsequently established the Faculty of Law in 2009. In 2010, the university introduced a Student Guesthouse to provide accommodation for its students. By 2013, TOBB University expanded its offerings with the establishment of the School of Medicine and the Technology Center. The university also launched the "GARAGE" program, designed to support students in developing and applying their business ideas in real-world scenarios under expert supervision.

In 2014, the Morphology Lab, originally part of the School of Medicine, began operating independently in its own facility.

== Academic units ==
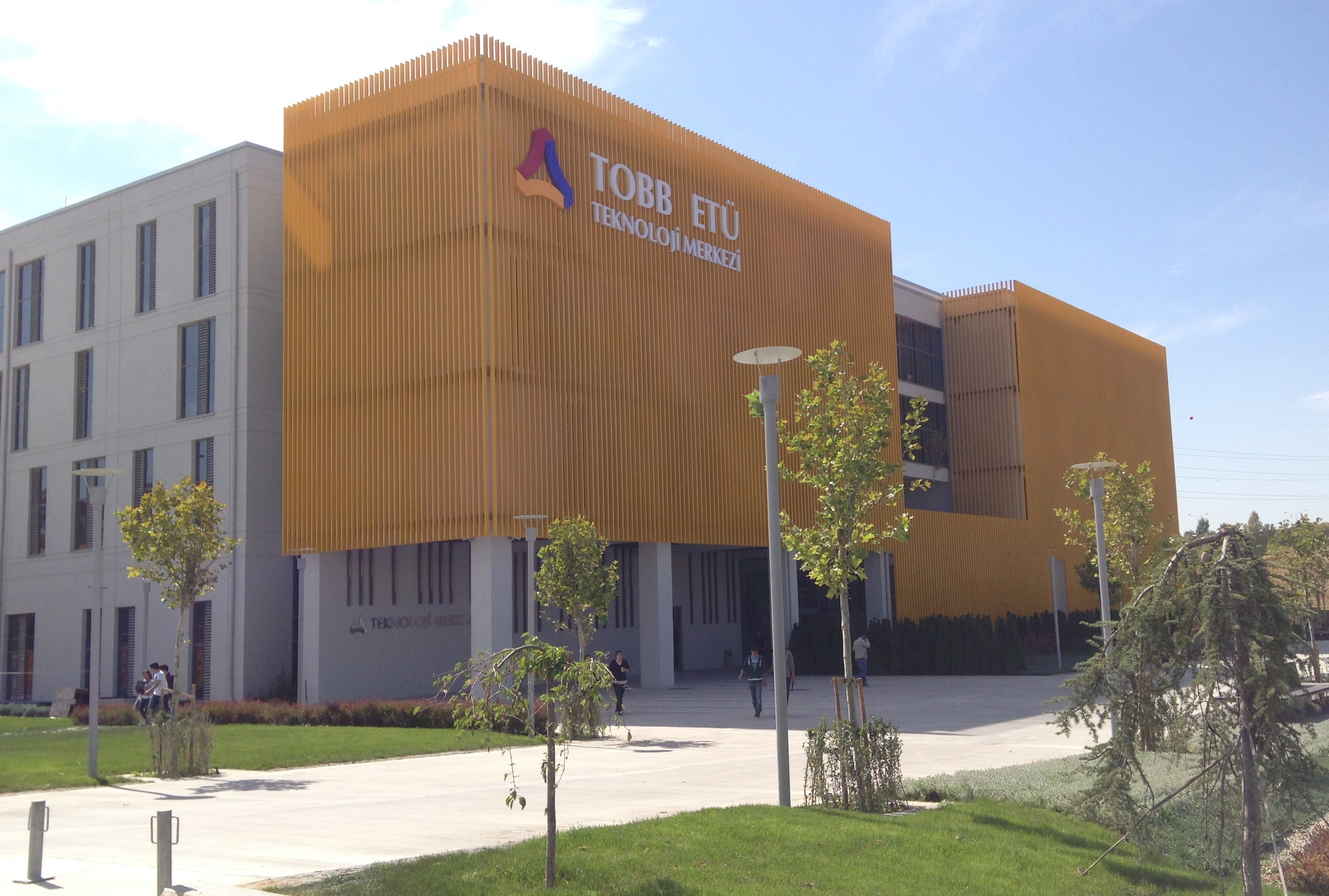
TOBB ETU Technology Center

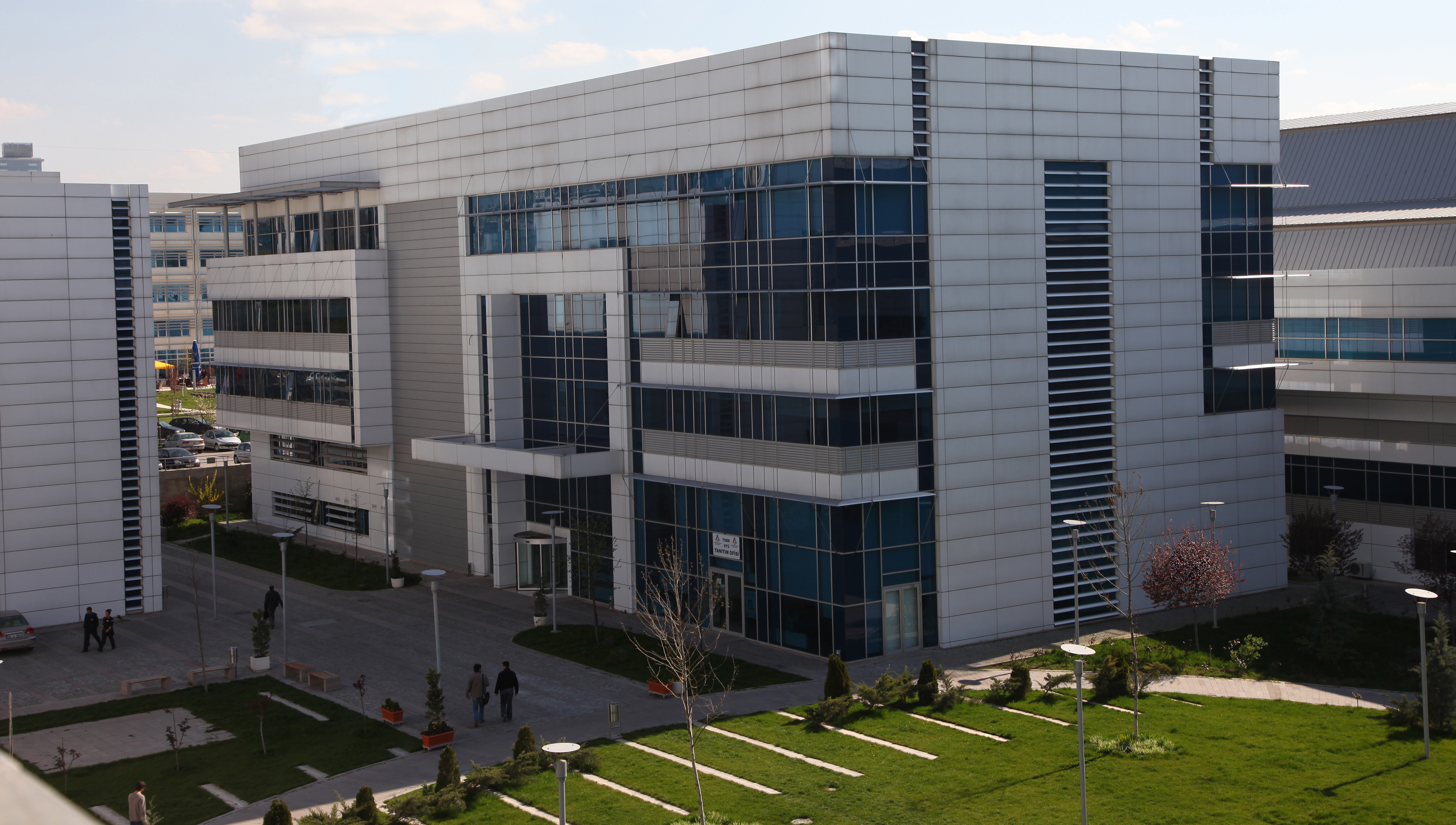
A view of TOBB ETU Campus

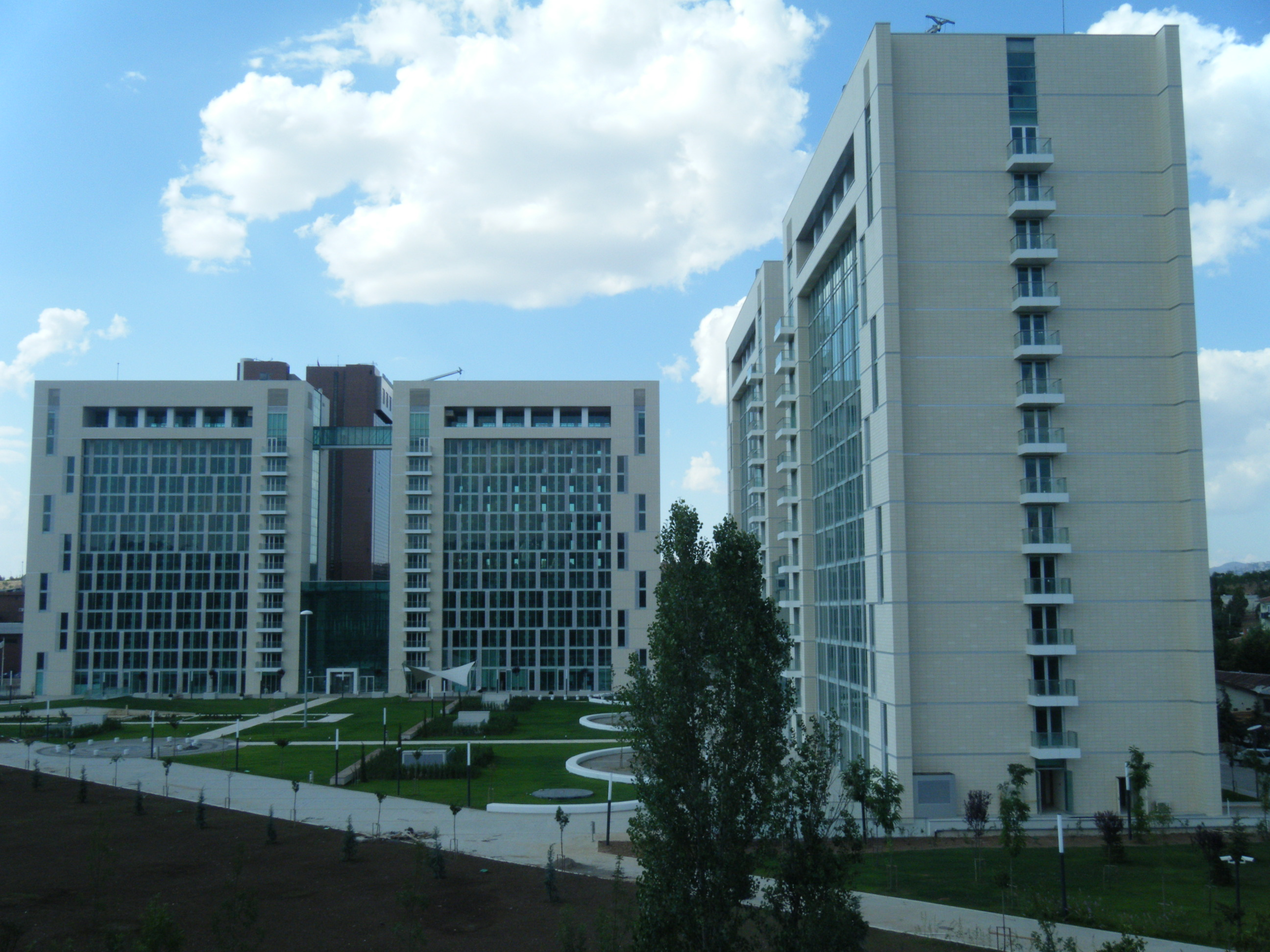
TOBB ETU Dormitories

=== Faculties and departments ===
- Faculty of Engineering
  - Department of Artificial Intelligence Engineering
  - Department of Biomedical Engineering
  - Department of Computer Engineering
  - Department of Electrical and Electronics Engineering
  - Department of Industrial Engineering
  - Department of Materials Science and Nanotechnology Engineering
  - Department of Mechanical Engineering
- Faculty of Economics and Administrative Sciences
  - Department of Business Administration
  - Department of Economics
  - Department of International Entrepreneurship
  - Department of Political Science and International Relations
- Faculty of Science and Literature
  - Department of English Language and Literature
  - Department of History
  - Department of Mathematics
  - Department of Turkish Language and Literature
  - Department of Psychology
- Faculty of Fine Arts
  - Department of Industrial Design
  - Department of Visual Communication Design
  - Department of Interior and Environmental Design
  - Department of Architecture
  - Department of Art and Design
- Faculty of Law
- Faculty of Medicine
- Department of Foreign Languages

=== Institutes ===
- Institute of Natural and Applied Sciences
- Institute of Social Sciences

=== International establishments ===
Starting with the educational year of 2020–2021, TOBB ETU Tashkent Campus in Uzbekistan will start accepting its first students. Established as a non-state university affiliated with Tashkent State University of Economics, the campus offers undergraduate programs in E-Commerce and Technology Management as well as International Business and Entrepreneurship.

== Student societies ==
TOBB University of Economics and Technology hosts 78 student societies, many with international affiliations. One notable example is the SDG Student Hub of TOBB ETÜ, an SDSN Youth initiative aimed at raising awareness about the Sustainable Development Goals and equipping students with resources to adopt sustainable practices.

== See also ==
- Education in Turkey
- List of universities in Turkey
