= Istanbul Commerce University =

Turkish foundation university located in İstanbul

Istanbul Ticaret University
- İstanbul Ticaret Üniversitesi
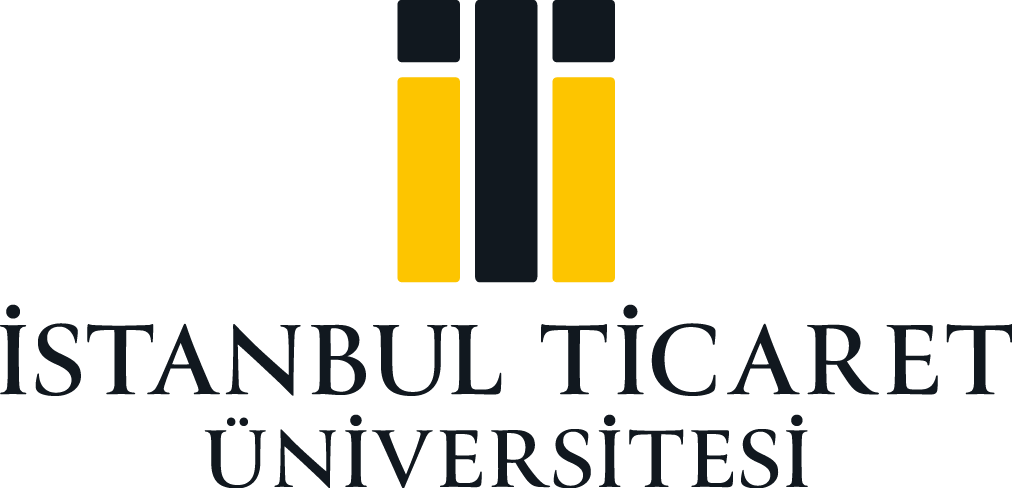
- Other names: ITU (in English); İTİCÜ (in Turkish)
- Motto: Uygulamalı eğitimde mükemmeliyet
- Type: Foundation university
- Established: 2001; 25 years ago
- Parent institution: Istanbul Chamber of Commerce
- Chairman: Öztürk Oran
- Rector: Yücel Oğurlu
- Academic staff: 400
- Students: 9600
- Undergraduates: 6500
- Postgraduates: 2500
- Location: Beyoğlu, Istanbul, Turkey
- Colours: Yellow and black
- Website: www.ticaret.edu.tr (in Turkish)

University rankings

Regional – Overall
- QS Emerging Europe and Central Asia: 401–450 (2022)

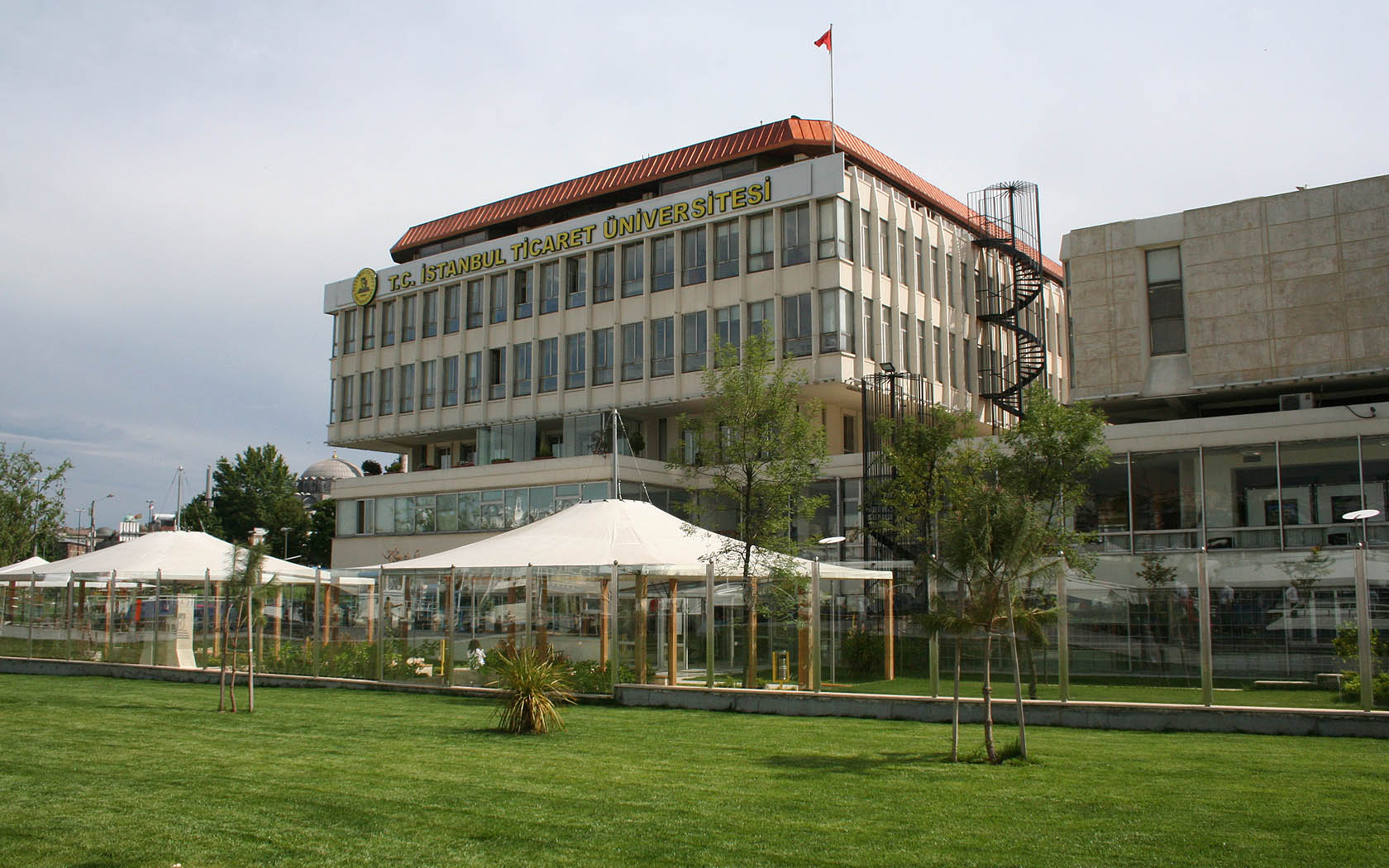
Eminönü Campus

Istanbul Ticaret University (Turkish: İstanbul Ticaret Üniversitesi) is a foundation university which was founded in 2001 by the Istanbul Chamber of Commerce Education and Social Services Foundation.

Istanbul Ticaret University, which provides education and training in two different campuses in Istanbul is a city university which is located in the most central points of Istanbul with six faculties, 24 departments, four institutes and 65 postgraduate programs.

== History ==
Mehmed Said Pasha (1838–1914), who was brought to the vice president in 1879, started to work to make an organization that would gather sector representatives under the same roof with regard to the problems of trade and industry. As a result of the works, the foundation of the chamber has been approved with the certify of Sultan II. Abdülhamid, Dersaadet Chamber of Commerce was founded completing the organization actions in 1882. ^{[5]} Dersaadet Chamber of Commerce provided the qualified personnel required by commercial life mostly from Darülfünun. This case would eventually evolve into the process of training the already trained manpower of himself.

The name of Darülfünun Dersaadet Chamber of Commerce changed to Istanbul Chamber of Commerce during the Republic period. The offer to establish a university within the chamber was officially offered by İsmail Özarslan in 1992 in ITO General Assembly. The offer was approved under the name of Ticaret University and studies started on this date.

ITO started its efforts in terms of establishing the university, established the university by the Istanbul Chamber of Commerce Education and Social Services Foundation. Article 5 of Law numbered 4633 and dated 14 April 2001, which is the founding law, was as follows:

The university's Establishment and Home Organization Regulation No. 24592 of the date 23 November 2001 published in the official newspaper and therefore with 73 students graduate in 2001, it began teaching as one of Turkey's first private university.

The support of the Istanbul Chamber of Commerce has been one of the key stones of the university's teaching philosophy and a teaching model which is close to the business world has been adopted. The support of ITO was approved to continue more effectively than before. The name of İsmail Özarslan, the originator of the idea, was given to the conference hall in Eminönü Campus of the university with the cooperation protocol signed between the university and ITO on 11 July 2012.

== Administration ==
The highest decision-making body of the university is the board of trustees. The board of trustees has the authority to make all kinds of decisions in financial and administrative cases and it is elected by the Education and Social Services Foundation of the Istanbul Chamber of Commerce.

As of 2018, the members of the delegation consist of the following names:

Istanbul Ticaret University Board of Trustees *
Name surname	Duty
Öztürk Oran	chairman of the board of Trustees
Yusuf Cevahir	Deputy chairman of the board of Trustees
Abdulkerim Çay	Board of Trustees Member
Avni Çelik	Board of Trustees Member
Bilal Topçu	Board of Trustees Member
Ethem Sancak	Board of Trustees Member
Güldal Akşit	Board of Trustees Member
Dr. Hayri Baraçlı	Board of Trustees Member
Assoc. Prof. Dr. Nihat Alayoğlu	Board of Trustees Member
Orhan Albayrak	Board of Trustees Member
Sultan Işık	Board of Trustees Member
Şekib Avdagiç	Board of Trustees Member
Ali Yerlikaya	Honorary Member
Yücel Oğurlu	Member-Rector

Rector, who is elected by the board of trustees, is the authorized person for the administration and representation of the university. Currently, the rector of the university is Prof. Dr. Yücel Oğurlu.

== Campuses ==
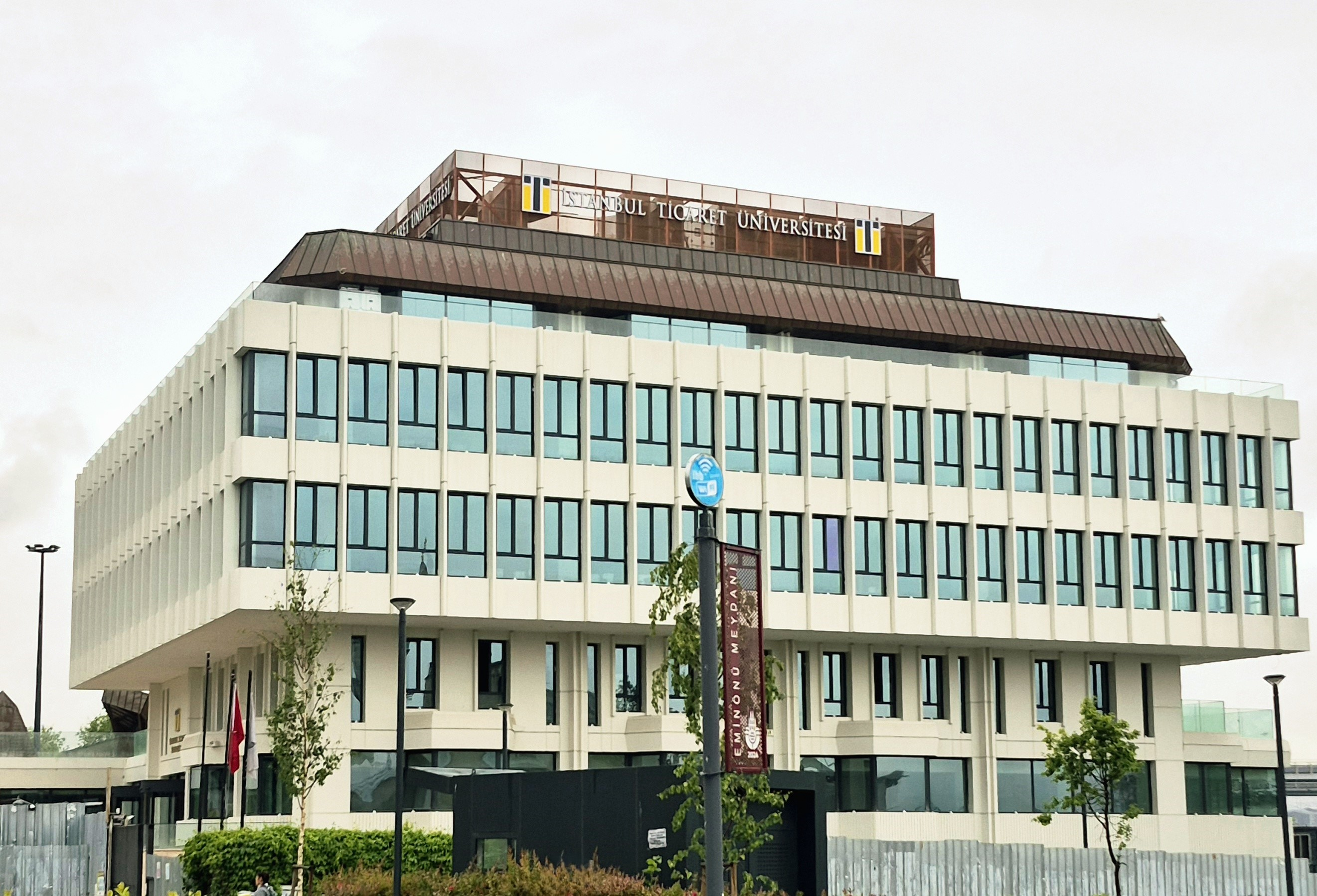
Istanbul Ticaret University in Eminönü.

Sutluce Campus

The campus which includes Business, Communication, Humanities and Social Sciences and Law faculties was established in 2013 on the Golden Horn coast. There is a Practical Courtroom for law school students; a broadcast studio (decor room, montage, radio, director), animation workshop, media workshop, photography and application workshops, MAC laboratories for the students of the Faculty of Communication in the campus. Students of the Faculty of Business can practice in the Virtual Bank Hall and BistLab Stock Exchange Hall available in the Sütlüce campus. Additionally, there are application areas such as Psychology Laboratory, Aviation Simulation Class, Sociopark.

Kucukyali Campus

There is a 3,000 square meter night reading room, 19 study rooms and a library which has a seating capacity of 500 people, with 226,000 printed and electronic books.

The Faculty of Engineering and the Faculty of Architecture and Design are available the campus of Küçükyalı, one of the central districts of Anatolian side. The campus has a physics laboratory, internet laboratories, computer laboratories covering different areas of expertise for each department, Computer Engineering hardware and software laboratories, Industrial Engineering Ergonomics and CİM / CİF laboratories. Furthermore, for the students of Faculty of Engineering, there is a Defense Industry Laboratory, PC Laboratory, Physics Laboratory, Electrical – Electronics Laboratory, Internet Laboratory, Forensic Information Laboratory; and for the students of the Faculty of Architecture and Design, there is a Model Workshop, Paint and Printing Laboratory, Knitting and Weaving Workshop and Drawing Workshop.

== Student life ==
=== Foreign language ===
Foreign language education in the university is primarily English. The knowledge assimilation of students is made possible by the more active addition of daily and weekly written and oral project presentations to their general-academic curriculum beginning from the beginner level. Students passing the Proficiency exam in September start their education in faculties. (Score to pass: 65)

Student exchange programs

==== Erasmus+Abroad Programs ====
This is a program organized with the aim of having education in any higher education institution in Europe for a specific period. There are 76 universities from 23 European countries with which we have signed student exchange agreements within the framework of the Erasmus + program.

==== Internationalization ====
Numerical data of international students studying at the university are given as follows;

- 353 undergraduate international students from 64 different nationalities,
- 407 international graduate students from 64 nationalities,
- There are around 1000 international students from 80 different nationalities enrolled in "YUO".
- 270 students from 34 African countries;
- 2 students from 2 American countries;
- 2 students from 24 Asia countries;
- 122 students from 20 European countries;
- 1 student from 1 Oceania country.

=== Grading system ===
American letter grading system was used in the university. Students whose anticipated median is 49 or below for the exams are considered unsuccessful and fail the course with an F score. A student with a median of 50 and above is subject to the bell curve in the relevant course.

=== Student clubs ===
The university has a total of 51 Student Clubs that operate at social, cultural and intellectual activities for students to offer opportunities for them to use their extracurricular time efficiently. ^{[B]} Some of the clubs are:

==== Communities ====
African Community
R&D and Innovation Community
Banking and Finance Community
Stock Exchange and Investment Community
Resurrection and Civilization Community
E- Sports Club
Industrial Engineering Community
Erasmus Community
Awareness Community
Photography Community
Traditional Turkish Archery Community
Young Thinking Community
Young Volunteers Community
Young Pioneers Community
Entrepreneurship Community
Law Academy Community
Law Community
Legal Thought Community
Rank Community
Career and Development Community
Culture and Literature Community
Architecture and Design Community
Fashion and Design Community
Debate Community
Prop Community
Music Community
Ombudsman Community
Psychology Community
Cinema Community
Civil Aviation Community
Political Science and International Relations Community
Social Sciences Community
Sociology Community
Underwater Community
Trade Communication Community
Theater Club
Turkish World Studies Community
Turkish Islamic Arts Community
Turkish Red Crescent Community
Aeronautics and Astronautics Community
Ultraslan UNI Community
UNİGFB Community
Production Research Community
Vuslat Community
Building and Construction Community
News’ Community
Generation Z Community

=== Spring Festivals ===
The spring festivals are organized with famous artists and various activities for 1 to 3 days for students to celebrate the arrival of spring and relieve the stress of the exam every year.

=== Disabled access ===
Where the physical conditions in all campuses are prepared for the comfortable use of disabled students, employees and academicians, course follow-up and social activities are also planned under conditions which are suitable for the smooth participation of disabled students in the university.

=== Cemile Sultan Wood ===
Students and university graduates can use the tennis courts, basketball courts and swimming pools at Kandilli Cemile Sultan Social Facilities for free.

=== TV and FM ===
Istanbul Ticaret University has a TV channel named "İletisim TV" with UHF 42 band and a radio channel named "101.8 İletişim FM" which the students are able to take advantage of. Other products of the university in the field of communication are the monthly "Italik" journal and 2 scientific refereed journals.

== Academic units ==
Istanbul Ticaret University is composed of 6 Faculties, Foreign Language Preparatory School, Vocational School, 3 Institutes and several Centers.

The faculties are the Faculty of Arts and Sciences, the Faculty of Commercial Sciences, the Faculty of Law, the Faculty of Engineering and Design, the Faculty of Communication and the Faculty of Applied Sciences. The Faculty of Arts is constituted of the Departments of Statistics, Mathematics and Psychology; the Faculty of Commercial Sciences is constituted of the Departments of Banking and Finance, Business Administration, Tourism Management, International Relations and International Trade; Faculty of Law includes the Department of Law; the Faculty of Engineering and Design is constituted of the Departments of Computer Engineering, Industrial Engineering, Fashion and Textile Design; the Faculty of Communication is constituted of the departments of Visual Communication Design, Public Relations and Media-Communication Systems.

The Vocational School is designed according to the trends in industry and commerce and the need of intermediate staff in Turkey. In this framework, the Vocational School is made up of programs such as Accounting (Tr/Eng), Foreign Trade, Computer Technology and Programming(Tr/Eng), Computer Technology and Programming (1+1), Air Logistics, Aviation Ground Services, Logistics, Accounting and Taxation Applications and International Logistics.

The university provides a one-year English Preparatory Program which is executed by the English Preparatory School.

=== Faculty of Law ===
The faculty in which Prof. Dr. Asuman Yılmaz is the rector. The language of education is given General English as a compulsory course and Legal English as an optional course while it is in Turkish in the faculty.

Social and cultural activities, social facilities, ITO support, various scholarship opportunities, and national and international symposiums, panels, conferences and seminars organized within the faculty, students are offered opportunities to improve themselves in the Faculty of Law.

=== Faculty of Humanities and Social Sciences ===
The faculty dean is Prof. Dr. Mustafa Said Yazıcıoğlu. The departments in the faculty are as follows: Statistics, Mathematics, Psychology, Sociology, Political science and International relations.

=== Communication Faculty ===
The faculty dean is Dr. Celalettin Aktaş.

The departments in the faculty are: Public relations and Advertising, Media and Communication, Visual Communication Design.

=== Faculty of Management ===
The departments in the faculty are as follows: Business, Business English, Economics, Economics English, Banking and Finance (English Supported), International Business (English Supported), International Logistics and Transportation (English Supported), Aviation Management.

=== Faculty of Engineering ===
The Faculty of Engineering was established by the joint venture of the Technopark, Istanbul Defense Industry Undersecretariat, Istanbul Chamber of Commerce and the university. Optional English courses are offered for students who desire to improve their English foreign language level in compliance with the general education policy of the university.

Basic Science, Mathematics and Technology courses are given in the first four semesters of the faculty; and the students are taught compulsory and elective courses related to their chosen field in the last four semesters. Students do internships for twenty working days each at the end of the second and third years.

The departments in the faculty are as follows: Electrical and Electronics Engineering in English, Mechatronics Engineering English, Computer engineering (English-Supported), Industrial engineering (English-Supported), Civil Engineering.

=== Architecture and Design Faculty ===
The departments in the faculty are as follows: Architecture, Interior Architecture and Environmental Design (English-Supported), Industrial Design, Fashion and Textile Design.

=== Graduate School of Finance ===
Postgraduate education is provided in five graduate schools at Istanbul Ticaret University. The Graduate School of Finance, which is a first in Turkey, structured its field of study with an integrated perspective, taking into account the theory, management, and policy of finance focused on the private and public sectors, financial economics, and applied finance. The Graduate School has four master's and two doctoral programs.

=== Graduate School of Communication Science and Internet ===
In graduate school, there are doctorate programs and graduate programs with and without a thesis.

=== Graduate School of Foreign Trade ===
The Graduate School of Foreign Trade, which has the distinction of being the first graduate school of foreign trade of Turkey, not only opens graduate programs at the academic level but also conducts applications and research on a sectoral basis directed towards the market. A master's degree with and without a thesis can be obtained at graduate school. There are doctoral programs in two different fields within the body of the Graduate School.

=== Graduate School of Social Sciences ===
The Graduate School of Social Sciences continues its education and research activities with many programs created in line with the needs of the sector. The faculty members of the graduate school also include doyens of finance and the real sector.

=== Graduate School of Natural and Applied Sciences ===
The Graduate School of Natural and Applied Sciences provides graduate and doctorate education with 11 different programs. Urban Systems and Transportation Management, Conservation and Restoration programs within the Graduate School are graduate programs that are the pioneers of their fields in Turkey. In addition, the Cyber Security doctorate program becomes prominent.

== Research and Application Centres ==
- European Union Research R/A Centre
- Intellectual Property and Competition Law R/A Centre
- Continuous Education Center
- TOEFL Center
- Career Planning Center
- Psychological Counseling Center
